= 40th Ariel Awards =

1998 Mexican film awards

- Date: December 14, 1998

Highlights
- Best Picture: Por Si No Te Vuelvo a Ver
- Most awards: Por Si No Te Vuelvo a Ver (8)
- Most nominations: Por Si No Te Vuelvo a Ver (19)

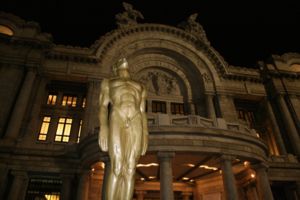

The 40th Ariel Awards ceremony, organized by the Mexican Academy of Film Arts and Sciences (AMACC) took place on December 14, 1998, in Mexico City. During the ceremony, AMACC presented the Ariel Award in 23 categories honoring films released in 1997. Por Si No Te Vuelvo a Ver received eight awards out of 19 nominations, including Best Picture and Best Director for Juan Pablo Villaseñor. De Noche Vienes, Esmeralda followed with five accolades; Libre de Culpas with three, and ¿Quién Diablos es Juliette? and Katuwira: Donde Nacen y Mueren los Sueños with two.

== Awards ==
Winners are listed first and highlighted with boldface

**Best Picture**: **Por Si No Te Vuelvo a Ver** – Centro de Capacitación Cinematográfica; De Noche Vienes, Esmeralda – Monarca Producciones; Elisa Before the End of the World – Televicine	**Best Director**: **Juan Pablo Villaseñor – Por Si No Te Vuelvo a Ver**; Juan Antonio De La Riva – Elisa Before the End of the World; Jaime Humberto Hermosillo – De Noche Vienes, Esmeralda
**Best Actor**: **Jorge Galván – Por Si No Te Vuelvo a Ver** **as Bruno**; Martín Altomaro – Libre de Culpas as Juan; Claudio Obregón – De Noche Vienes, Esmeralda as Víctor Solorio	**Best Actress**: **Leticia Huijara – Por Si No Te Vuelvo a Ver** **as Margarita**; Sherlyn González – Elisa Before the End of the World as Elisa; María Rojo – De Noche Vienes, Esmeralda as Esmeralda Loyden Monroy
**Best Supporting Actor**: **Max Kerlow** – **Por Si No Te Vuelvo a Ver** **as Gonzalo**; Roberto Cobo – De Noche Vienes, Esmeralda as Virginio Lara; Justo Martinez – Por Si No Te Vuelvo a Ver as Óscar Martínez	**Best Supporting Actress**: **Martha Navarro** – **De Noche Vienes, Esmeralda** **as Lucita**; Zaide Silvia Gutiérrez – Por Si No Te Vuelvo a Ver as Nurse Silvia; Angelina Peláez – Por Si No Te Vuelvo a Ver as Diana Menchaca
**Best Actor in a Minor Role**: **Ignacio Retes** – **Por Si No Te Vuelvo a Ver** **as Poncho**; Juan Carlos Colombo – Alta Tensión; Tito Vasconcelos – De Noche Vienes, Esmeralda as Josefa/Josefo	**Best Actress in a Minor Role**: **Blanca Torres** – **Por Si No Te Vuelvo a Ver** **as Rosita**; Ana Bertha Espín – Por Si No Te Vuelvo a Ver as Asylum Director; Ana Ofelia Murguía – De Noche Vienes, Esmeralda as Beatríz
**Best Original Screenplay**: **Por Si No Te Vuelvo a Ver – Juan Pablo Villaseñor**; Elisa Before the End of the World – Paula Markovitch; ¿Quién Diablos es Juliette? – Carlos Marcovich	**Best Adapted Screenplay**: **De Noche Vienes, Esmeralda – Jaime Humberto Hermosillo from De Noche Vienes by Elena Poniatowska**; Libre de Culpas – Marcel Sisniega; Por Si No Te Vuelvo a Ver – Juan Pablo Villaseñor
**Best First Feature Film**: **¿Quién Diablos es Juliette? – Carlos Marcovich**; Libre de Culpas – Marcel Sisniega; Por Si No Te Vuelvo a Ver – Juan Pablo Villaseñor	**Best Live Action Short**: **Sonríe – Lorenza Manrique**; Martimonio – Enrique Arroyo; Pasajera – Jorge Villalobos
**Best Documentary Short Subject**: **José Barrientos – Juan Carlos Carrasco**; Al Viaje de Juana – Adele Schmidt; ¡Ojalá Que Te Mueras! – Karl Lenin González	**Best Original Score**: **Libre de cCulpas – Zbigniew Paleta**; Por Si No Te Vuelvo a Ver – Tito Enríquez; ¿Quién Diablos es Juliette? – Alejandro Marcovich
**Best Original Song**: **Libre de culpas – Zbigniew Paleta**; Alta Tensión – Armando Manzanero; ¿Quién Diablos es Juliette? – Benny Ibarra	**Best Sound**: **Elisa Before the End of the World – Miguel Sandoval and Nerio Barberis**; De Noche Vienes, Esmeralda – Antonio Diego; ¿Quién Diablos es Juliette? – Antonio Diego and Juan Carlos Prieto
**Best Film Editing**: **¿Quién Diablos es Juliette? – Carlos Marcovich**; Katuwira: Donde Nacen y Mueren los Sueños – Carlos Bolado; Libre de Culpas – Sigfrido Barjau	**Best Art Direction**: **De Noche Vienes, Esmeralda – Claudio Pache Contreras and Lourdes Almeida**; Libre de Culpas – Miguel Ángel Álvarez; Por Si No Te Vuelvo a Ver – Rocío Ramírez
**Best Set Decoration**: **De Noche Vienes, Esmeralda – Carlos Herrera and Lourdes Almeida**; Elisa Before the End of the World – Alberto Villaseñor and Ángeles Martínez; Por Si No Te Vuelvo a Ver – Guillermo Rodríguez	**Best Cinematography**: **Libre de culpas – Serguei Saldívar Tanaka**; De Noche Vienes, Esmeralda – Xavier Pérez Grobet; ¿Quién Diablos es Juliette? – Carlos Marcovich
**Best Costume Design**: **De Noche Vienes, Esmeralda – Lourdes Almeida**; Katuwira: Donde Nacen y Mueren los Sueños – Nancy Romero; Por Si No Te Vuelvo a Ver – Verónica Telch	**Best Makeup**: **Katuwira: Donde Nacen y Mueren los Sueños – Alfredo Tigre Mora**; De Noche Vienes, Esmeralda – Georgina Miranda; Por Si No Te Vuelvo a Ver – Diana Byrne
**Best Special Effects**: **Katuwira: Donde Nacen y Mueren los Sueños – Federico Farfán**; De Noche Vienes, Esmeralda – Alejandro Vázquez; Elisa Before the End of the World – Alejandro Vázquez

== Multiple nominations and awards ==
The following seven films received multiple nominations:

Nominations	Film
19	Por Si No Te Vuelvo a Ver
16	De Noche Vienes, Esmeralda
8	Libre de Culpas
7	Elisa Antes del Fin del Mundo
7	¿Quién Diablos es Juliette?
4	Katuwira: Donde Nacen y Mueren los Sueños
2	Alta Tensión

Films that received multiple awards:

Awards	Film
8	Por Si No Te Vuelvo a Ver
5	De Noche Vienes, Esmeralda
3	Libre de Culpas
2	¿Quién Diablos es Juliette?
2	Katuwira: Donde Nacen y Mueren los Sueños
