= Maxisingle (Paulina Rubio EP) =

MaxiSingle

EP by Paulina Rubio
- Released: October 29, 1995
- Studios: Miami, Florida
- Genres: Pop; dance-pop; club
- Length: 39:54
- Label: EMI Mexico
- Producers: Marco Flores; Miguel Blasco

Paulina Rubio chronology
El Tiempo Es Oro (1995)	MaxiSingle (1995)	Planeta Paulina (1996)

Singles from Maxi-Single
- 1. "Pobre Niña Rica" Released: October 2, 1995

Maxisingle (stylized as "MaxiSingle") is the first extended play (EP) by Mexican recording artist Paulina Rubio, released in October 1995, in Mexico and United States by EMI Mexico. A digitally edition was released in January 2005. It contains seven tracks: "Pobre Niña Rica", main song by the Mexican telenovela of the same name, three remixes of "Te Daría Mi Vida", and others three remixes of "Nada De Ti", both songs previously released on Rubio's third studio album, El Tiempo Es Oro.

The EP was released alongside of Rubio's first compilation album Grandes Éxitos/Versiones Remix, only released in South America, which contained the greatest hits of Rubio and remixes version.

== Track listing ==
The song "Pobre Niña Rica" was written and produced by Marco Flores. The remix versions of "Te Daría Mi Vida" and "Nada De Ti" were performed by Alejandro "Midi" Ortega

MaxiSingle – CD, cassette, and digital edition
No.	Title	Length
1.	"Pobre Niña Rica"	4:25
2.	"Te Daría Mi Vida" (Big Mix)	6:13
3.	"Te Daría Mi Vida" (Radio Edit)	4:14
4.	"Te Daría Mi Vida" (Dub Version)	6:08
5.	"Nada De Ti" (Big Mix)	6:26
6.	"Nada De Ti" (Radio Edit)	4:30
7.	"Nada De Ti" (Dub Version)	7:50
Total length:		39:54

== Personnel ==
Adapted from the album's liner notes.

- Paulina Rubio – lead vocals
- Miguel Blasco – arrangement, production
- Marco Flores – engineering assistance, production, songwriter
- Cesar Valle - songwriter
- C Sanchez - songwriter
- Alejandro "Midi" Ortega – mixing
