= El Tiempo Es Oro (album) =

Album by Paulina Rubio

Studio album by Paulina Rubio
- Released: 21 March 1995
- Recorded: September – December 1994
- Studios: Balu-Balu Estudios (Madrid, Spain); South Beach Studios (Miami, Florida); Studio Center (Miami, Florida)
- Genres: Pop; dance-pop; pop rock; bubblegum pop; downtempo
- Length: 51:11
- Labels: EMI Mexico, Virgin
- Producers: Miguel Blasco; Marco Flores; Adrián Posse

Paulina Rubio chronology
24 Kilates (1993)	El Tiempo Es Oro (1995)	MaxiSingle (1995)

Singles from El Tiempo Es Oro
- 1. "Te Daría Mi Vida" Released: 17 January 1995; 2. "Nada De Ti" Released: 22 May 1995; 3. "Hoy Te Dejé De Amar" Released: 20 June 1995; 4. "Bésame En La Boca" Released: 25 June 1995

El Tiempo es Oro (Spanish: "Time Is Gold") is the third studio album by Mexican pop singer Paulina Rubio, released simultaneously on 21 March 1995 by EMI Mexico in 18 countries. It was recorded in the autumn and winter of 1994 in Madrid, Spain, and Miami, Florida. The album was produced by Miguel Blasco as with her previous studio albums, but included new producers and collaborations including Marco Flores, Adrián Posse and Claudio Bermúdez. Aged 23 at the time, Rubio was more involved in the creating and arranging process compared to her two previous albums, leading her to a new, bolder image and a more dance-influenced sound, exemplified by the lead single. El Tiempo Es Oro deals with many subjects about love including relationships, passion, crushes, cheating, disappointment, and happiness.

The album spawned four singles. "Te Daría Mi Vida" became one of Rubio's biggest successes with the EMI label, charting inside the top ten in Latin America and selling more than 140,000 copies in Mexico and the United States combined. The music video was an output of her "girl in love", showing Rubio at her funniest and most spontaneous. The album had a fleeting promotion in Spain and is noted for beginning her international pop singing career.

The following singles—"Nada De Ti", and "Hoy Te Dejé De Amar"—all peaked inside the top 10 in Mexico. The last single, "Bésame En La Boca", was released to promote the film of the same name, in which Rubio also starred. She further promoted the album with a show touring South America. The album was re-issued in Spain in 2001 by Virgin Records.

== Background ==
Rubio's third album was produced, like the first two, by the Spanish producer Miguel Blasco. On the album, Rubio used a more stylish and contemporary dance sound, and later said she had aimed to "talk about what I am, what I represent for people and also open my heart".

== Composition ==
El Tiempo Es Oro is a pop record. The second track, "Te Daría Mi Vida" is a dance-pop song in the europop style.

== Promotion ==
Rubio promoted the album in 1995 and 1996 by performing a series of concerts in Latin American countries including Mexico and Costa Rica, and on American and Mexican television programs such as En Vivo, Siempre en Domingo, and Sábado Gigante. Rubio traveled to South America in July 1995 and performed in clubs such as El Divino of Colombia, where she sang the album's singles.

With El Tiempo Es Oro, Paulina Rubio had the opportunity to perform for the first time in Spain. Her first performance was in February 1996 during the Carnival of Santa Cruz de Tenerife, where she performed some of her hits including "Te Daría Mi Vida" and "Nada De Ti". A month before performing at the Tenerife Festival, the singer had appeared in different magazines in Spain, where she was shown as the girlfriend of architect and socialite Ricardo Bofill Jr.

=== Singles ===
The album's lead single "Te Daría Mi Vida" was released in January 1995. Many critics noted Rubio's new style, different from her previous music. The song was successful on the charts of countries including Argentina and Mexico. The music video was directed by Carlos Marcovich and was filmed in Estudios Churubusco in Mexico. The album's second single "Nada De Ti" was released in May 1995, and peaked inside the top ten in Argentina, Colombia, and Mexico.

A third single, "Hoy Te Dejé De Amar", was released in June 1995. The song was a success at radio airplay and fans consistently cite it as a favorite ballad of the EMI era. "Bésame En La Boca" had less success than her previous singles. It was included in the soundtrack of the film of the same name, in which Rubio also starred. "Amarnos No Es Pecado" was released as a radio single; the pop-rock song was acclaimed as one of Rubio's best works on El Tiempo Es Oro.

== Critical reception ==
Professional ratings
Review scores
Source	Rating
Allmusic	2/5 stars

Upon its release, El Tiempo Es Oro received mixed reviews from music critics. The album was acclaimed for its musical production. In its launch review, newspaper El Semanario de México denoted the "rhythmic and danceable" vibe on the album, and noted that Rubio follows "the same line that has characterized her since 1991", referring to the concept of 'Golden Girl'. In the book El Huracán Mexicano, Paulina Rubio argued El Tiempo Es Oro is the final chapter to complete the "gold trilogy", after La Chica Dorada (1992) and 24 Kilates (1993), constituting Rubio's projects as "Golden Girl", and all produced by Miguel Blasco. Some years later, AllMusic rated the album two out of five stars, a rating similar to that given to Rubio's prior album 24 Kilates.

== Commercial performance ==
The album sold 100,000 copies in Mexico alone.

== Track listing ==
No.	Title	Writer(s)	Producer(s)	Length
1.	"Introducción"	C. Valle; C. Sánchez	Miguel Blasco	1:16
2.	"Te Daría Mi Vida"	Valle; Sánchez	Blasco	4:12
3.	"A Ti, Volver, Regresar"	Claudio Bermúdez	Blasco	3:46
4.	"Hoy Te Dejé De Amar"	Marco Flores	Blasco; Marco Flores	3:55
5.	"Nada De Ti"	Flores	Blasco; Flores	3:31
6.	"No Me Obligues"	José Luis Campuzano; Carolina Cortés; Mario De Jesús	Blasco	4:18
7.	"Si Te Marchas Con Otra"	Valle; Sánchez	Blasco	3:55
8.	"Amarnos No Es Pecado"	Daniel García; Mario Schajris; Vanessa Mendez	Blasco	3:12
9.	"Aún"	Bermúdez; Paulina Rubio	Blasco	3:31
10.	"Me Estoy Enamorando"	Valle; Sánchez	Blasco	3:35
11.	"Sola"	Valle; Sánchez; Nacio Herb Brown	Blasco	5:16
12.	"En El Nombre Del Amor"	Valle; Sánchez	Blasco	3:58
13.	"Un Día Gris"	Valle; Sánchez	Blasco	2:52
14.	"Bésame En La Boca"	Adrián Posse; Didi Gutman	Adrián Posse	3:54
Total length:				51:11

El Tiempo Es Oro – iTunes Store (bonus track)
No.	Title	Writer(s)	Producer(s)	Length
15.	"Pobre Niña Rica"	Flores	Flores	4:25
Total length:				55:34

== Personnel ==
The following people contributed to El Tiempo Es Oro:

Personnel listing
- Paulina Rubio – lead vocals, backing vocals, main performer, songwriter, concept

Additional personnel

- Miguel Blasco – music director, executive producer
- Marco Flores - composer, songwriter
- Adrián Pose – executive producer, composer
- Didi Gutman - arrangements, songwriter
- Carlos Sácnhez - composer, songwriter
- Carolina Cortes - composer, songwriter
- Cesar Valle - composer, songwriter
- Claudio Bermúdez - composer, songwriter
- Daniel García - composer, songwriter
- José Luis Campuzano - composer, songwriter
- Mario Schajris - composer, songwriter
- José David Peñín Montilla, Juan Sueiro, Pedro Vidal – arrangements
- Alberto de Palacio – engineering
- Juan Cerro — guitar arrangements
- Pedro Vidal - programming
- Leo Herrera — assistant engineer
- Kenneth Barzilai – photography
- Sergio Toporek — artwork, digital mastering
- Aida — artwork, digital mastering

== Sales ==
Region	Certification	Certified units/sales
Mexico	—	100,000

== Release history ==
Country	Release format	Label
Mexico	CD; LP; Cassette; Reissue	EMI Music
United States	CD; LP	EMI Music
Spain	CD; LP; Reissue	Virgin

== See also ==
- 1995 in Latin music

== Bibliography ==
- Luna, Iraide (2001), Paulina Rubio "El Huracán Mexicano", Biblioteca Nacional de España: Nuer Ediciones, ISBN 978-84-8068-079-0
