= Golden Ariel =

Mexican film award

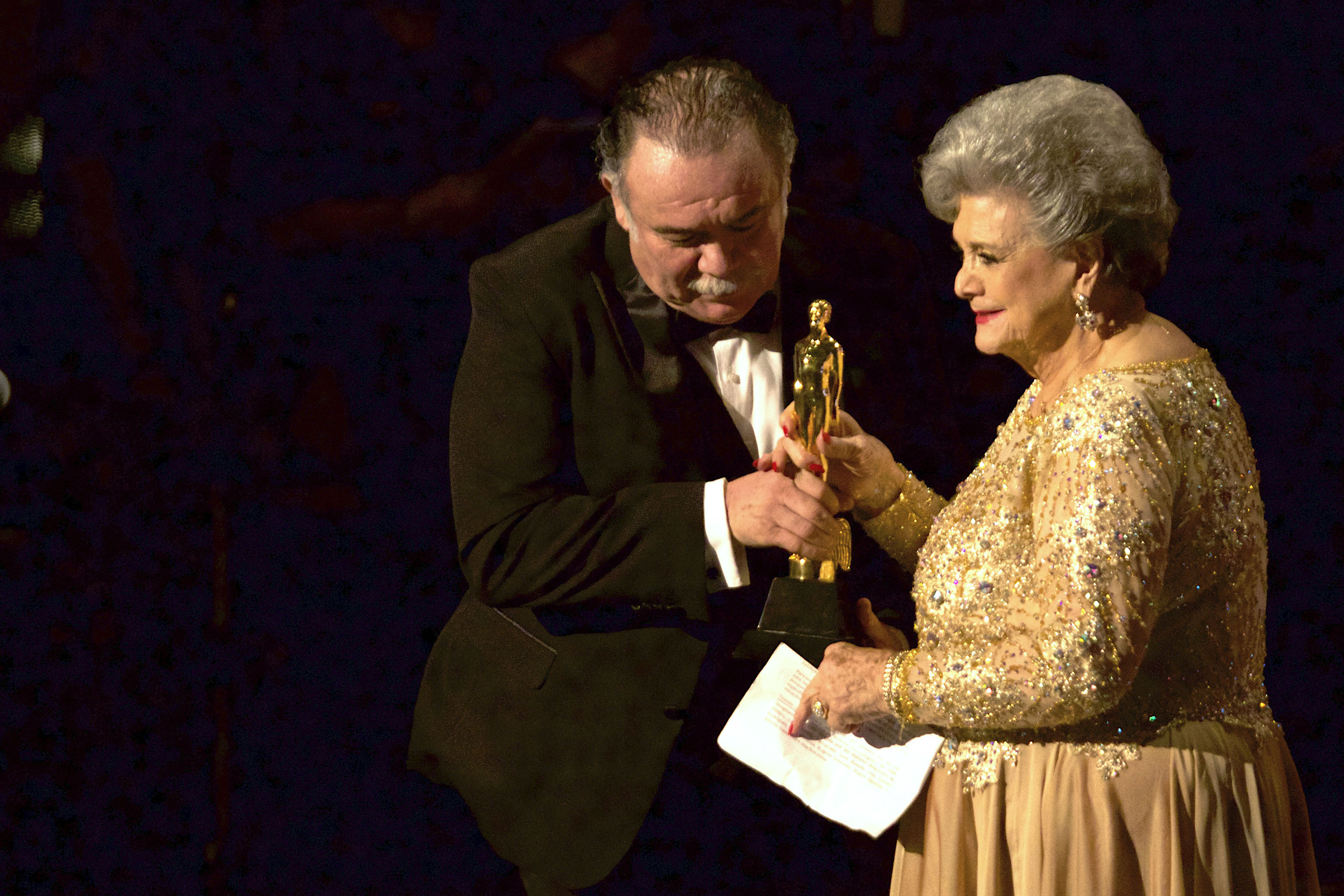

The Golden Ariel (Spanish: Ariel de Oro) is an award that “symbolizes the work of excellence that a member of the film industry has achieved throughout their career and that has contributed to the development and growth of Mexican cinematography”. The Golden Ariel is the highest award given to an individual or institution in the Mexican film industry by the Mexican Academy of Cinematographic Arts and Sciences. It has been awarded annually since 1946 as part of the Ariel Awards and is also given to films that win Best Picture.

== Award results ==
=== 1973 ===
- Alex Phillips

=== 1975 ===
- Dolores del Río

=== 1977 ===
- Rodolfo Echeverría

=== 1978 ===
- Luis Buñuel

=== 1980 ===
- Felipe Cazals

=== 1986 ===
- María Félix

=== 1987 ===
- Mario Moreno “Cantinflas”
- Gabriel Figueroa

=== 1991 ===
- La sombra del caudillo de Julio tree Branch
- Raúl de Anda Gutiérrez

=== 1992 ===
- Ismael Rodríguez
- Fernando de Fuentes

=== 1993 ===
- Marga López
- Miguel Zacarías

=== 1994 ===
- Adalberto Martínez “Resortes”
- Gregorio Walerstein

=== 1995 ===
- Manuel Esperón

=== 1996 ===
- Raúl Lavista

=== 1997 ===
- Katy Jurado
- Antonio Aguilar
- Roberto Cañedo

=== 1998 ===
- Janet Alcoriza
- Rafael Leal

=== 1999 ===
- Lilia Prado
- Walter Reuter

== 2000 ==
Year	Winner	Profession	Notes
2000	Libertad Lamarque	Actress	
2000	Gunther Gerzso	Actor	
2001	Lupita Tovar	Actress	
2001	Rubén Gámez	Filmmaker	
2002	Emilio Carballido	Writer	
2002	Emilio García Riera	Actor, writer, film critic	
2003	Filmoteca de la UNAM		UNAM's film archive
2003	Elsa Aguirre	Actress	
2004	Estudios Churubusco Azteca		Movie studio
2004	Gloria Schoemann	Editor	
2005	Carmen Montejo	Actress	
2005	Julio Pliego	Filmmaker	
2006	Ernesto Alonso	Film producer	
2006	Centro Universitario de Estudios Cinematográficos (CUEC)		Film school
2006	Centro de Capacitación Cinematográfica (CCC)		Film school
2007	Ignacio López Tarso	Actor	
2007	Rosalío Solano	Cinematographer	
2008	Silvia Pinal	Actress	
2009	Alejandro Parodi	Actor	
2009	Fannie Kauffman	Actress	

== 2010 ==
Year	Winner	Profession	Notes
2010	Cineteca Nacional		Mexico's national cinematheque
2010	Felipe Cazals	Filmmaker	
2011	Jorge Fons	Filmmaker	
2011	Ana Ofelia Murguía	Actress	
2012	Alfredo Joskowicz	Filmmaker and actor	
2012	René Ruiz Cerón	Actor	
2013	Columba Domínguez	Actress	
2013	Mario Almada	Actor	
2013	Rafael Corkidi	Cinematographer	
2014	Arturo Ripstein	Filmmaker	
2014	Ernesto Gómez Cruz	Actor	
2015	Bertha Navarro	Producer	
2015	Miguel Vásquez	Filmmaker	
2016	Rosita Quintana	Actress	
2017	Isela Vega	Actress	
2018	Queta Lavat	Actress	
2018	Toni Kuhn	Cinematographer and producer	
2019	Héctor Bonilla	Actor	

== 2020 ==
Year	Winner	Profession	Notes
2020	Lucía Álvarez	Film composer	
2020	María Rojo	Actress	
2021	Ofelia Medina	Actress	
2021	Fernando Cámara	Producer and Sound	
2022	Diana Bracho	Actress	
2022	David Baksht	Sound	
2023	Guadalajara University's Image and Sound Department		
2023	Juan Mora Cattlet	Director, editor and screenwriter	
2023	Marcela Fernández Violante	Filmmaker	
2024	Busi Cortés	Filmmaker	
2024	Brigitte Broch	Production designer	
2024	Angélica María	Actress and singer	
2025	Jacqueline Andere	Actress	
2025	Patricia Reyes Spíndola	Actress	
2025	Cinema Production Workers' Union		Trade union founded in 1945
