= Por si no te vuelvo a ver =

Por Si No Te Vuelvo a Ver
- Mexican theatrical release poster
- Directed by: Juan Pablo Villaseñor
- Screenplay by: Juan Pablo Villaseñor
- Produced by: Gustavo Montiel; Andrea Gentile
- Starring: Jorge Galván; Ignacio Retes; Justo Martínez; Max Kerlow; Rodolfo Vélez; Leticia Huijara
- Cinematography: Janusz Polum
- Edited by: Miguel Lavandeira
- Music by: Tito Enríquez
- Production company: Centro de Capacitación Cinematográfica
- Release date: 1997 (GIFF))
- Running time: 97 minutes
- Country: Mexico
- Language: Spanish

Por Si No Te Vuelvo a Ver (In Case I Never See You Again) is a 1997 Mexican drama film, directed by Juan Pablo Villaseñor and produced by the Centro de Capacitación Cinematográfica. The film received eight Ariel Awards in 1998 including Best Picture, Best Director, Best Actor and Best Actress.

== Plot ==
A musical quintet formed by retired elders in an asylum, under the pretext of delivering the ashes of his friend Rosita (Blanca Torres) to Margarita (Leticia Huijara), her niece, in order to achieve their dream of performing on stage.

== Main cast ==
- Jorge Galván as Bruno
- Ignacio Retes as Poncho
- Justo Martínez as Óscar Martínez
- Max Kerlow as Gonzalo
- Rodolfo Vélez as Fabián
- Leticia Huijara as Margarita
- Zaide Silvia Gutiérrez as Nurse Silvia
- Ana Bertha Espín as the asylum director
- Angelina Peláez as Diana Menchaca
- Blanca Torres as Rosita
- José Carlos Rodríguez as Dr. Eduardo Bolaños
- Alfredo Alonso as Vinicio
- Óscar Castañeda as Miranda
- Aurora Cortés as Ofelia

== Awards ==
=== Ariel Awards ===
The Ariel Awards are awarded annually by the Mexican Academy of Film Arts and Sciences in Mexico. Por Si No Te Vuelvo a Ver won eight awards out of 19 nominations.

Year	Nominee / work	Award	Result
1998	Centro de Capacitación Cinematográfica	Best Picture	Won
1998	Juan Pablo Villaseñor	Best Director	Won
1998	Jorge Galván	Best Actor	Won
1998	Leticia Huijara	Best Actress	Won
1998	Max Kerlow	Best Supporting Actor	Won
1998	Justo Martinez	Best Supporting Actor	Nominated
1998	Angelina Peláez	Best Supporting Actress	Nominated
1998	Zaide Silvia Gutiérrez	Best Supporting Actress	Nominated
1998	Ignacio Retes	Best Actor in a Minor Role	Won
1998	Blanca Torres	Best Actress in a Minor Role	Won
1998	Ana Bertha Espín	Best Actress in a Minor Role	Nominated
1998	Juan Pablo Villaseñor	Best Screenplay	Nominated
1998	Juan Pablo Villaseñor	Best Original Story	Won
1998	Juan Pablo Villaseñor	Best First Feature Film	Nominated
1998	Tito Enríquez	Best Original Score	Nominated
1998	Rocío Ramírez	Best Art Direction	Nominated
1998	Guillermo Rodríguez	Best Set Design	Nominated
1998	Verónica Telch	Best Costume Design	Nominated
1998	Diana Byrne	Best Makeup	Nominated
