= Peregrina =

Peregrina may refer to:

- Jatropha integerrima, commonly known as peregrina, a species of flowering plant in the spurge family, Euphorbiaceae
- Peregrina (Venezuelan TV series), a 1973 Venezuelan telenovela
- Peregrina (Mexican TV series), a 2005 Mexican telenovela
- Peregrina (film), a 1951 Mexican film
- "Peregrina", a song commissioned by Felipe Carrillo Puerto

== See also ==
- La Peregrina, a pearl
