= Bésame En La Boca =

Bésame En La Boca may refer to:

- Bésame En La Boca (film), a 1995 Mexican film
- "Bésame En La Boca" (song), a 1995 song by Paulina Rubio
