= Pablo y Andrea =

- Genre: Children's telenovela
- Created by: Lorena Salazar
- Based on: The Adventures of Tom Sawyer by Mark Twain
- Written by: Lorena Salazar; Areli Caraza; Alejandro Cicchitti; Salvador Jarabo
- Directed by: Gastón Tuset; Claudia Elisa Aguilar
- Starring: Marcia Coutiño; Guillermo Capetillo; Mercedes Molto; Jorge Trejo; Danna Paola
- Opening theme: Pablo y Andrea by Danna Paola
- Country of origin: Mexico
- Original language: Spanish
- No. of episodes: 75 (original broadcast); 100 (international)

Production
- Executive producer: Lucero Suárez
- Production locations: Filming; Televisa San Ángel; Mexico City, Mexico; Locations; Huasca de Ocampo, Mexico
- Cinematography: Gilberto Macín; Jorge Miguel Valdés
- Camera setup: Multi-camera
- Running time: 41-44 minutes
- Production company: Televisa

Original release
- Network: Canal de las Estrellas
- Release: August 1 – November 11, 2005

Related
- Sueños y caramelos; Peregrina

Pablo y Andrea (English: Pablo and Andrea) is a Mexican children's telenovela produced by Lucero Suárez for Televisa in 2005. Pablo y Andrea is an adaptation of the classic The Adventures of Tom Sawyer by Mark Twain. The adventures are not developed on the coast of the Mississippi River, but in the magical town of Huasca de Ocampo in the Mexican state of Hidalgo.

It was the last children's telenovela produced by Televisa, the lack of interest of the public with novels generated lower-rated audience. Scenes were cut from the original broadcast in order to reduce the 100 episodes to 75 because of the low ratings.

On August 1, 2005, Canal de las Estrellas started broadcasting Pablo y Andrea weekdays at 4:00pm, replacing Sueños y caramelos. The last episode was broadcast on November 11, 2005 with Peregrina replacing it.

Marcia Coutiño and Guillermo Capetillo starred as adult protagonists, Danna Paola and Jorge Trejo starred as young protagonists, while Mercedes Molto, Eduardo Rivera, María Fernanda Núñez, Adrián Alonso, Valentina Cuenca and Geraldine Galván starred as antagonists.

== Cast ==
- Guillermo Capetillo as Juan Carlos Saavedra
- Marcia Coutiño as Carmen
- Mercedes Molto as Carlota/Úrsula/Bárbara/Socorro Barraza
- Jorge Trejo as Pablo Ibáñez
- Danna Paola as Andrea Saavedra
- Ingrid Martz as Alma
- Jesús Zavala as Nicolás
- Geraldine Galván as Hilda
- Nadiedka as Mati
- Rodrigo Llamas as Pepe
- Valentina Cuenca as Rita
- Valeria López as Susana "Susanita"
- Adrián Alonso as Martín Ibáñez
- María Fernanda Núñez as Diana
- Beng Zeng as Joaquín
- Carlos Espejel as Tobías
- Zully Keith as Virginia Slater
- Carol Sevilla as Nicole Slater
- Juan Carlos Colombo as Sabás
- Nuria Bages as Gertrudis Ibáñez
- Eduardo Rivera as Míkonos
- Mario Casillas as Don Severino
- Adalberto Parra as Quintero
- Raquel Morell as Ellen Slater
- Rodrigo Mejía as Rodrigo Castro
- Jorge Ortín as Cirilo Frutos
- Carlos Ignacio as Abelardo
- Luis Gimeno as Don Cipriano Saavedra
- Lupe Vázquez as Tiba
- Loreli Mancilla as Laura
- Bárbara Gómez as Concepción "Conchita"
- René Azcoitia as Father Bonifacio
- Anastasia as Paula
- Alan Ledesma as Osvaldo
- Rafael Perrín as Mateo
- Luis Camarena as Anacleto
- Jaime Lozano as Francisco "Pancho" Ortíz
- Luis Reynoso as Jesús
- Thelma Tixou as Leonor
- Arturo Lorca as Pielinsky
- Juan Imperio as Moctezuma
- Maripaz García as Toña
- Iliana de la Garza as Lupe
- Javier Ruán as Imanol
- Bodokito as Chana

== Awards ==
Year	Award	Category	Nominee	Result
2006	24th TVyNovelas Awards	Best Child Performance	Danna Paola	Won
