= Bésame en la Boca (song) =

1995 song by Paulina Rubio

"Bésame En La Boca"

Single by Paulina Rubio

from the album El Tiempo Es Oro
- Released: 25 June 1995
- Recorded: Balu-Balu Estudios (Madrid, Spain)
- Genre: Latin pop; Bolero
- Length: 3:56
- Label: EMI Latin
- Songwriters: Adrian Posse; Didi Gutman
- Producer: Adrian Posse

Paulina Rubio singles chronology
"Hoy Te Dejé De Amar" (1995)	"Bésame En La Boca" (1995)	"Pobre Niña Rica" (1995)

Music video
- "Bésame En La Boca (Video)" on YouTube

"Bésame En La Boca" (Kiss Me on the Mouth) is a Latin pop song with influences bolero written and produced by Adrian Posse and Didi Gutman. It was released by Mexican singer Paulina Rubio as the final single from her third studio album, El Tiempo Es Oro (1995). It was released in June 1995 in Mexico and in September in the rest of Latin America. Rubio's cover was also included on the soundtrack of the film of the same name, which she also starred in. The song did not have commercial success like their other singles and the airplay promotion was overshadowed with the promotional song of the Mexican telenovela Pobre Niña Rica.

== Track listing and formats ==
- Mexico CD, Single, Promo
1. "Bésame En La Boca" – 3:56
