= 24th TVyNovelas Awards =

2006 Mexican TV awards

- Date: May 13, 2006
- Location: Mundo Imperial Forum, Acapulco, Guerrero
- Hosted by: Eduardo Santamarina & Joana Benedek

Highlights
- Most awards: Alborada (7)
- Most nominations: La madrastra (14)

Television/radio coverage
- Network: Canal de las Estrellas

The 24th TVyNovelas Awards were an academy of special awards to the best soap operas and TV shows. The awards ceremony took place on May 13, 2006 at the Mundo Imperial Forum, Acapulco, Guerrero. The ceremony was televised in Mexico by Canal de las Estrellas.

Eduardo Santamarina and Joana Benedek hosted the show. Alborada won 7 awards, the most for the evening, including Best Telenovela. Other winners La madrastra and Rebelde won 2 awards and La esposa virgen, Pablo y Andrea and Piel de otoño won 1 each.

== Summary of awards and nominations ==
| Telenovela | Nominations | Awards |
|---|---|---|
| La madrastra | 14 | 2 |
| Rebelde | 12 | 2 |
| Alborada | 11 | 7 |
| La esposa virgen | 8 | 1 |
| Piel de otoño | 4 | 1 |
| Sueños y caramelos | 4 | 0 |
| Peregrina | 2 | 0 |
| Pablo y Andrea | 1 | 1 |

== Winners and nominees ==
=== Telenovelas ===
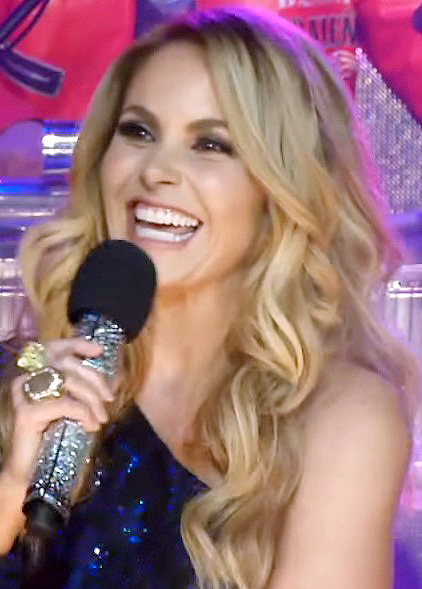
Lucero, winner for Best Actress.

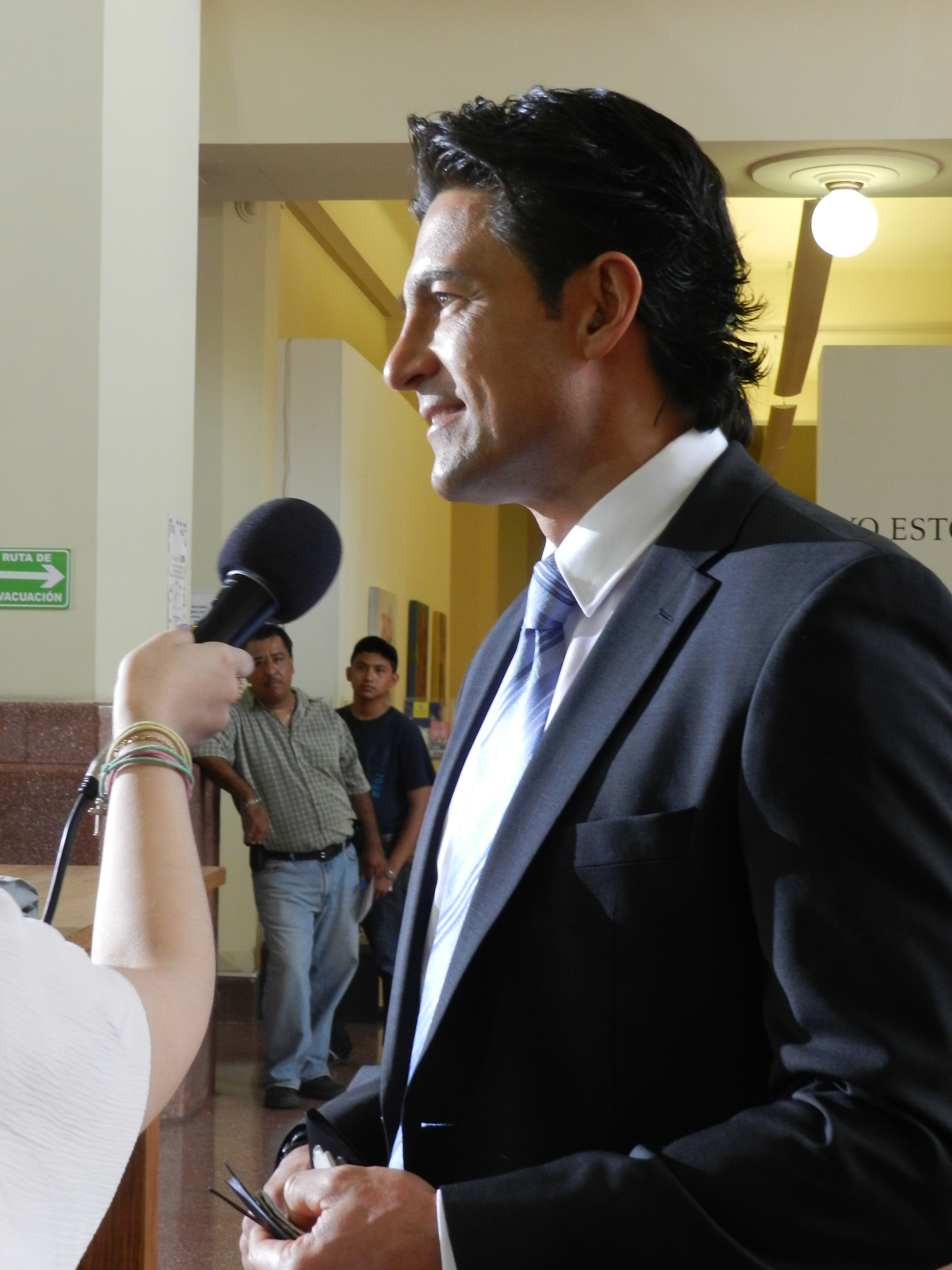
Fernando Colunga, winner for Best Actor.

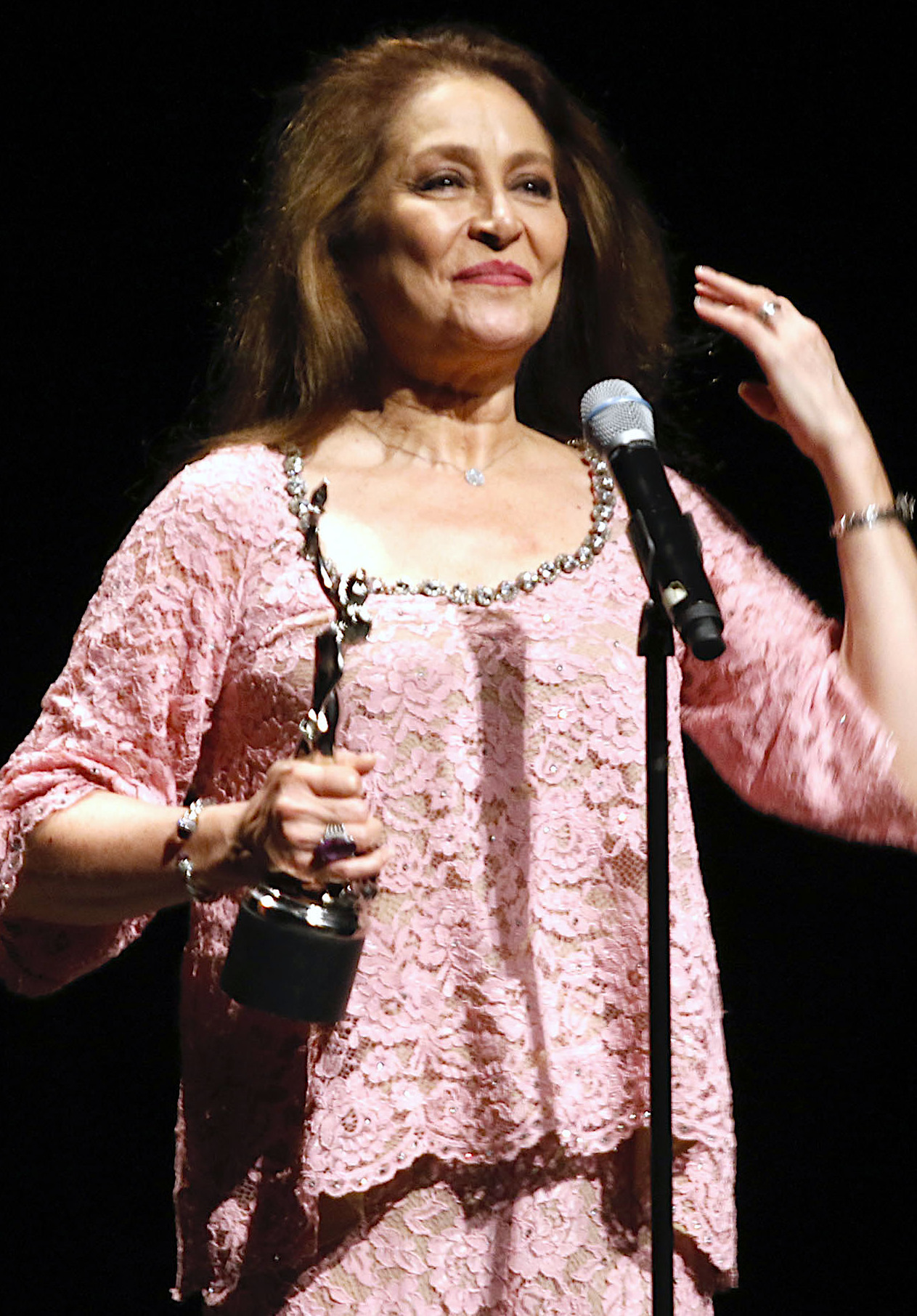
Daniela Romo, winner for Best Antagonist Actress.

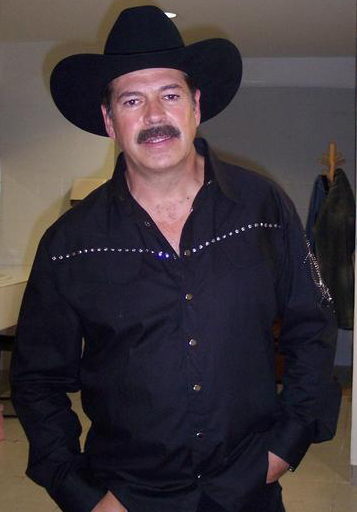
Sergio Goyri, winner for Best Antagonist Actor.

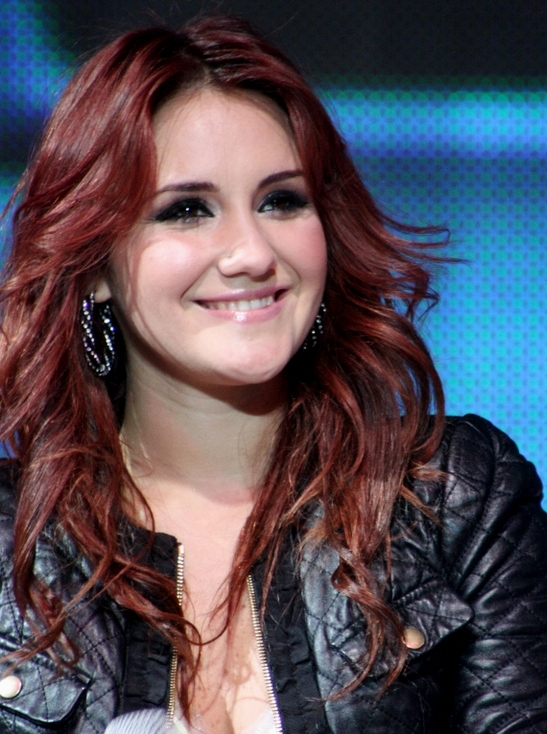
Dulce María, winner for Best Young Lead Actress.

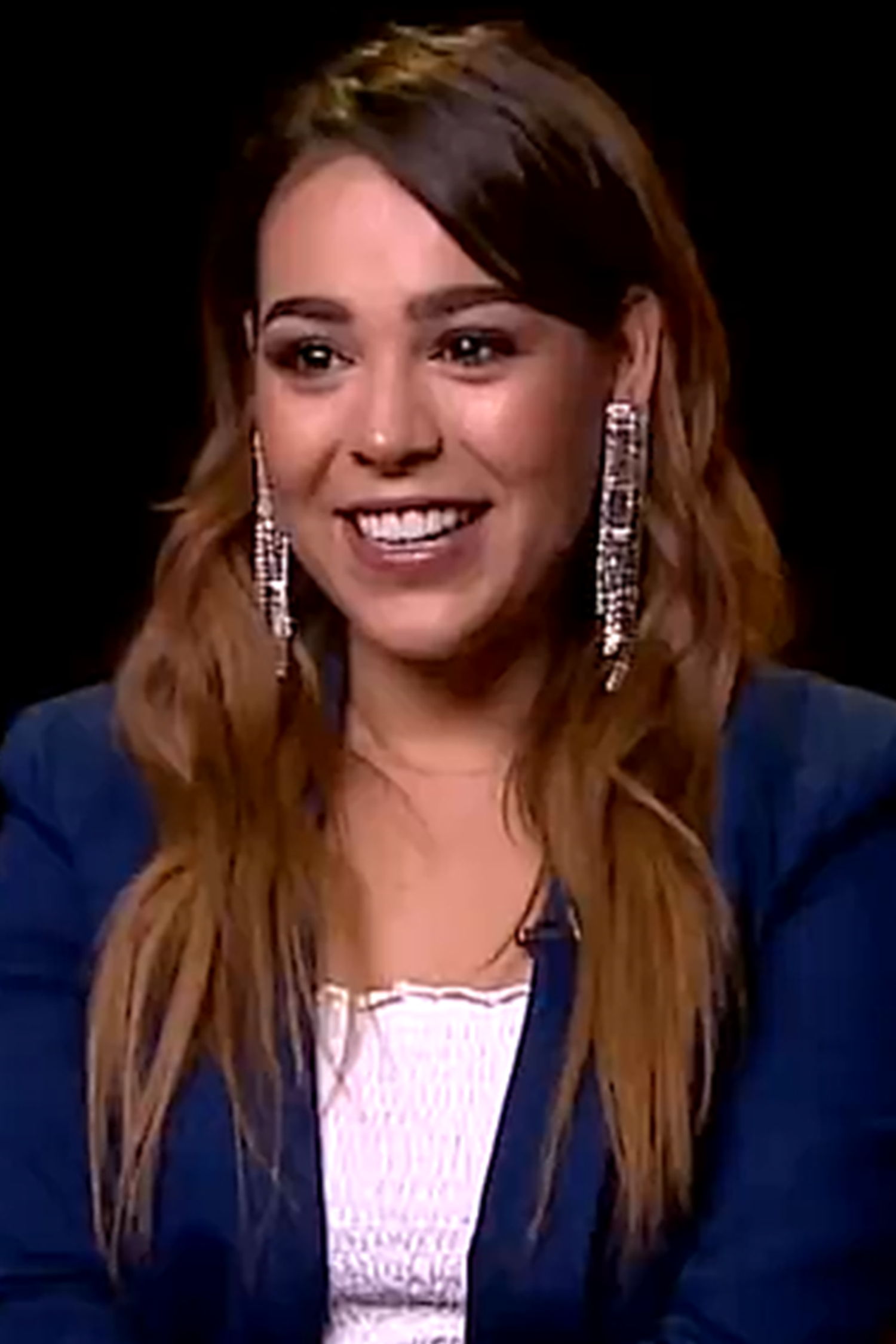
Danna Paola, winner for Best Child Performance.

| Best Telenovela | Best Musical Theme |
|---|---|
| Alborada; La esposa virgen; La madrastra; Rebelde | "Rebelde" — RBD – Rebelde; "Alborada" — Plácido Domingo – Alborada; "Esta ausencia" — David Bisbal – Piel de otoño; "Víveme" — Laura Pausini – La madrastra |
| Best Actress | Best Actor |
| Lucero – Alborada; Adela Noriega – La esposa virgen; Ninel Conde – Rebelde; Victoria Ruffo – La madrastra | Fernando Colunga – Alborada; César Évora – La madrastra; Juan Ferrara – Rebelde; René Strickler – Piel de otoño |
| Best Antagonist Actress | Best Antagonist Actor |
| Daniela Romo – Alborada; Cynthia Klitbo – Peregrina; Jacqueline Andere – La madrastra; Lilia Aragón – La esposa virgen | Sergio Goyri – Piel de otoño; Enrique Rocha – Rebelde; Guillermo García Cantú – La madrastra; Luis Roberto Guzmán – Alborada |
| Best Leading Actress | Best Leading Actor |
| Delia Casanova – La esposa virgen; Ana Martín – La madrastra; Helena Rojo – Peregrina; Raquel Olmedo – Piel de otoño | Manuel Ojeda – Alborada; Joaquín Cordero – La madrastra; Luis Bayardo – La esposa virgen; Raúl Padilla "Choforo" – Sueños y caramelos |
| Best Supporting Actress | Best Supporting Actor |
| Mariana Karr – Alborada; Leticia Perdigón – Rebelde; Margarita Isabel – La madrastra; Natalia Esperón – La esposa virgen | Ernesto Laguardia – Alborada; César Évora – La esposa virgen; Rafael Inclán – Rebelde; René Casados – La madrastra |
| Best Young Lead Actress | Best Young Lead Actor |
| Dulce María – Rebelde; Anahí – Rebelde; Ana Layevska – La madrastra; Sherlyn – Alborada | Mauricio Aspe – La madrastra; Alfonso Herrera – Rebelde; Christopher Uckermann – Rebelde; José Luis Reséndez – La madrastra |
| Best Child Performance | Best Direction |
| Danna Paola – Pablo y Andrea; Maracena Miguel – Sueños y caramelos; Nashla Aguilar – Sueños y caramelos; Sebastián – La esposa virgen | Eric Morales and Jorge Édgar Ramírez – La madrastra; Karina Duprez and Lilí Garza – Sueños y caramelos; Luis Pardo and Juan Carlos Muñoz – Rebelde; Mónica Miguel – Alborada |

=== Others ===
| Best Comedy Program or Series | Best Variety or Musical Program |
|---|---|
| El privilegio de mandar; La hora pico; Mujer, casos de la vida real; Vecinos | La parodia; Hoy; La oreja; Otro rollo |
| Best Competitions Program | Best Special Program |
| Bailando por un sueño; 100 mexicanos dijeron; Código F.A.M.A. 3; Vas o no vas | Celebremos México; Bailando por México; Mañanitas a la Virgen; Teletón México |
Best Host or Hostess
Talina Fernández – Nuestra casa; Adal Ramones – Otro rollo; Andrea Legarreta – Hoy; Ernesto Laguardia – Hoy

=== Special awards ===
- Special Award for Artistic Career: Raúl Velasco
- Special Award for 33 years of Artistic Career: Daniela Romo
- Special Recognition for Career: Joaquín Cordero

=== Absent ===
People who did not attend the ceremony and were nominated in the shortlist in each category:

- Adela Noriega
- César Évora (He was not present during the presentation of the shortlist for Best Actor)
- Joaquín Cordero
- Laura Pausini
- Lilia Aragón
- Macarena Miguel
- Nashla Aguilar
- Natalia Esperón
- Ninel Conde
- Sebastián
