= Busi Cortés =

Mexican filmmaker (1950–2024)

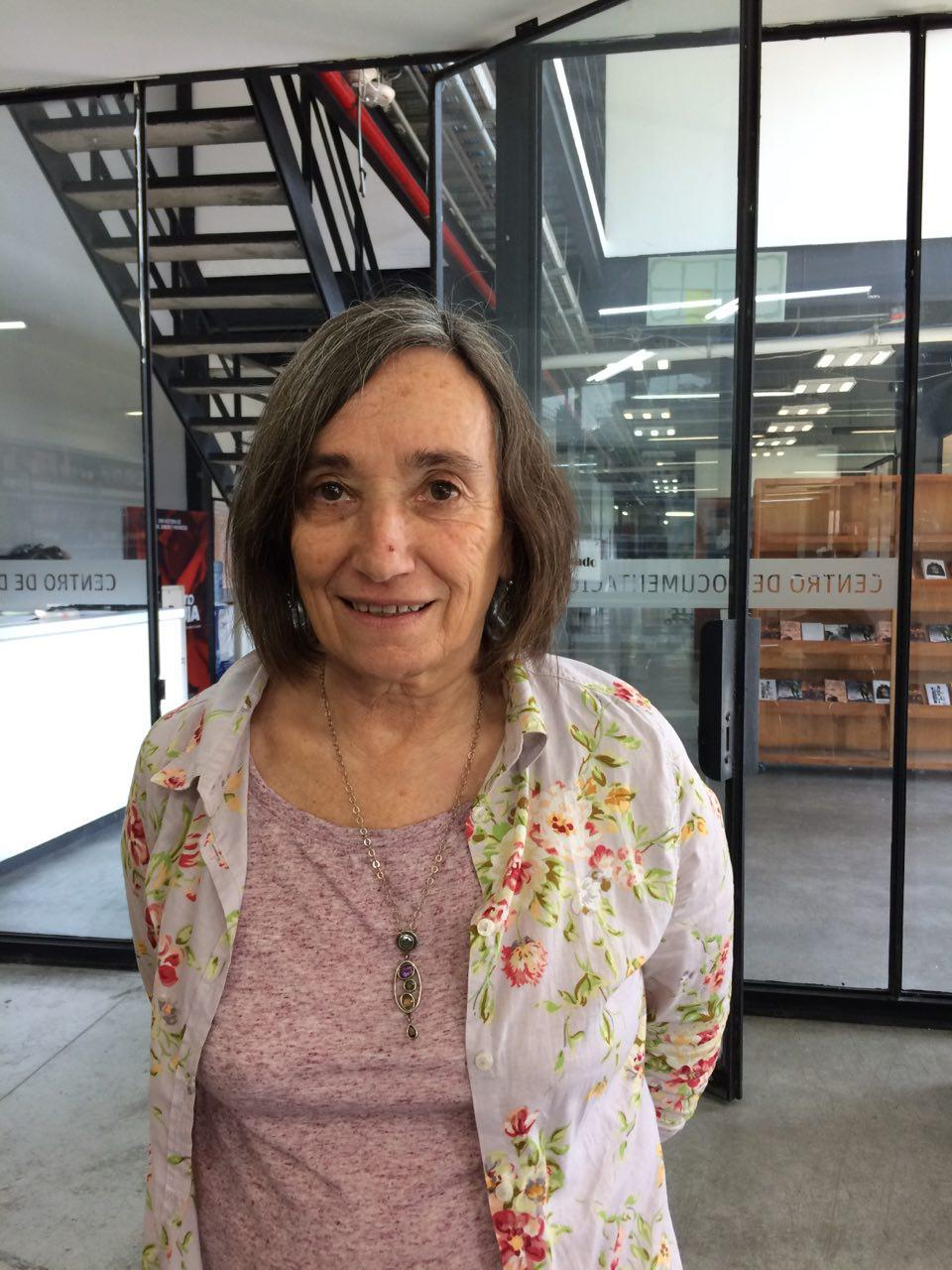
- Cortés in 2016
- Born: Luz Eugenia Cortés Rocha; June 28, 1950; Mexico City, Mexico
- Died: June 21, 2024 (aged 73)
- Occupation: Filmmaker
- Notable work: El secreto de Romelia (1988)

Luz Eugenia Cortés Rocha (June 28, 1950 – June 21, 2024), better known as Busi Cortés, was a Mexican filmmaker, screenwriter, documentarian and professor. Her work as a director and screenwriter had a significant impact on Mexican cinema, bringing in women's perspectives, particularly of women in Mexican politics.

She emerged as a filmmaker with 1988's El secreto de Romelia, which was the first film produced by the Centro de Capacitación Cinematográfica under its Óperas Primas initiative, which supports debut feature films by young artists. Cortés would go on to teach at the CCC.

== Biography ==
Luz Eugenia Cortés Rocha was born in Mexico City in 1950, to a family with roots in Guanajuato. She studied communications at the Universidad Iberoamericana, then enrolled in the Centro de Capacitación Cinematográfica in 1977. While at the CCC, she directed the short films Las Buenromero (1978) and Un frágil retorno (1979), as well as the featurette Hotel Villa Goerne (1981).

Under her artistic name Busi Cortés, she went on to direct three narrative feature films, starting with El secreto de Romelia in 1988. The film, based on Rosario Castellanos' novel El viudo Román, won various national and international prizes. It was followed by Serpientes y escaleras (1991) and Las Buenrostro (2005), the latter of which was presented at the Morelia International Film Festival.

The director was also known for her documentaries, such as La séptima filmación (1973) and Déjalo ser (1992).

Cortés also directed various TV series such as El aula sin muros, medio siglo de tarea; Retos y respuestas; ABC Discapacidad; Santitos y santones; and Pasando el siglo en el cine, among others. In 2001, she won the José Revueltas Prize for Best Documentary for Paco Chávez (2005), co-directed with Francisco Chávez. In 2011, in partnership with the National Autonomous University of Mexico's Filmoteca, she produced the documentary short En trazos de vida. Son de Rina y Bustos. She also wrote a children's program, Rogelio y los rollos velados, in 2014.

She was a Sistema Nacional de Creadores de Arte grant recipient, a member of the Academia Mexicana de Artes y Ciencias Cinematográficas, and a member of the Union of Cinema Production Workers. A strong activist for women working in film, she co-founded and served as president of Mexico's Women in Film and Television Association. In 2018, she obtained a master's degree from the University of Guadalajara and Cineteca Nacional's film studies program, examining the impact of her own film El secreto de Romelia over the previous three decades. She also taught at the CCC, her alma mater.

On June 19, 2024, it was announced that Cortés would be awarded the Golden Ariel, the highest honor in the Mexican film industry. She died two days later, at the age of 73.

== Filmography ==
=== Feature films ===
- 1988 – El secreto de Romelia.
- 1991 – Serpientes y escaleras.
- 2005 – Hijas de su madre: Las Buenrostro.

=== Featurettes ===
- 1981 – Hotel Villa Goerne.
- 1983 – El lugar del corazón.

=== Short films ===
- 1978 – Las Buenromero.
- 1979 – Un frágil retorno.
- 1997 – Unidos.

=== Documentaries ===
- 1973 – La séptima filmación.
- 1992 – Déjalo ser.
- 2000 – Paco Chávez.
- 2010 – La escuela viva.
- 2011 – En trazos de vida. Son de Rina y Bustos.

=== TV series ===
- 1984–1985 – De la vida de las mujeres.
- 1993–1997 – Cultura en movimiento.
- 1994–1997 – El aula sin muros, medio siglo de tarea.
- 1994–1997 – Retos y respuestas.
- 1996–1997 – Pasando el siglo en el cine.
- 1998–2000 – ABC Discapacidad.
- 2002 – Santitos y santones.
- 2014 – Kipatla (screenwriter).
