= Imanol Landeta =

Mexican actor and singer

- Born: Imanol Goenaga Martí; July 23, 1987 (age 38); Mexico City, Mexico
- Occupations: Actor, singer, pilot
- Parent(s): Manuel Landeta (father)
- Relatives: Jordi Landeta (brother)

Imanol Landeta (born Imanol Goenaga Martí on July 23, 1987), more commonly known simply as Imanol, is a Mexican former singer and actor. His acting career started with the film Última llamada in 1996, and he has appeared in almost a dozen films and television series since. He is the son of actor Manuel Landeta. Imanol Landeta began working as an airplane pilot after retiring from show business.

== Discography ==
- 2007: Señales
- 2004: Es Hoy
- 2002: Si tú supieras
- 2000: Creciendo juntos
- 1999: Pescador
- 1998: Pedacitos de amor
- 1997: Imanol

== Filmography ==
=== Films ===
Year	Title	Role	Notes
1996	Última llamada	Mario Cortés	
1997	Elisa Before the End of the World	Miguel	
2003	Un secreto de Esperanza	Jorge	
2007	Surf's Up	Cody	Voice role; Latin-American Spanish dub

=== Television ===
Year	Title	Role	Notes
1992	Chiquilladas		
1993	Plaza Sésamo		
1997	Los hijos de nadie		
1998	Vivo por Elena	Juanito	
1999	El niño que vino del mar	Felipín Rodríguez Cáceres de Ribera	
2002	Clase 406	Alejandro Acero Pineda	
2003	De pocas, pocas pulgas	Rolando	
2003	Velo de novia	Alexis Robleto	
2005	Bajo el mismo techo	José "Pepe Jr" Acosta	
2005	Bailando Por Un Sueño	Himself	
2006	Código Postal	Pablo Rojas Alonso	
2008	Juro que te amo	Pablo Lazcano	
2009	Verano de amor	Daniel Gurzan	
2024	Papás por conveniencia	Felipe	

== Theater ==
- 1996: Marcelino Pan y Vino
- 1989: Qué plantón
