= Elisa Before the End of the World =

1997 Mexican film

- Film poster
- Directed by: Juan Antonio de la Riva
- Written by: Paula Markovitch
- Produced by: Roberto Gómez Bolaños
- Starring: Sherlyn González; Imanol Landeta
- Cinematography: Arturo de la Rosa
- Edited by: Óscar Figueroa
- Music by: Óscar Reynoso
- Production company: Televicine
- Distributed by: Videocine
- Release date: 21 February 1997 (Mexico)
- Running time: 80 minutes
- Country: Mexico
- Language: Spanish

Elisa Before the End of the World (Spanish: Elisa antes del fin del mundo) is a 1997 Mexican drama directed by Juan Antonio de la Riva and produced by Roberto Gómez Bolaños. Set during the aftermath of the Mexican peso crisis, the film depicts the impact of the economic recession caused by the peso devaluation on middle-class families, as well as the insecurity problems in Mexico City.

== Plot ==
Elisa and her family live in an apartment in Colonia Roma, an upper-middle-class neighborhood in Mexico City. They are facing a deep financial crisis and are on the verge of losing their car due to her father's overdue payments. One day, he tells Elisa that when the world is about to end, humanity will be forced to eat cockroaches to subsist.

Elisa tells this to Miguel, her younger neighbor and friend, and together they start collecting cockroaches in a plastic box. One day, they meet Paco, a punk kid who sneaks onto their rooftop to steal chickens from a neighboring building.

After a visit from Gómez, a bank employee, Elisa learns that if her father does not pay his debt to the bank, they could lose not only the car but also their furniture and even their apartment. After her parents sell their television and a gun her father owned to get some money, Elisa decides to look for a job to help her family. Paco tells Elisa and Miguel that he has something of his brother's that could help her make money.

The next day, Paco shows Elisa a gun that his brother used for robberies but tells her that it has no bullets. Elisa considers robbing a store to get money; however, after another visit from Gómez, she decides to target the bank instead. As a test, Elisa and Paco go to a toy store and steal two pairs of roller skates after threatening an employee.

Elisa tells Paco about the toy store robbery, but he informs her that the gun had no bullets, as he was unable to obtain any. She then remembers that, although her father's gun was sold, the bullets might still be somewhere in the house. She searches for them and eventually finds them hidden in her parents closet.

The day of the robbery, Elisa meets Gómez outside the bank as he arrives for work; Miguel and Paco wait across the street. They enter together, and she joins the queue, preparing to take out the gun. Before she can act, an armed group storms the bank, opening fire and declaring a robbery. Outside, Paco attempts to enter the bank but is shot dead by an accomplice. Inside, Elisa is caught in the crossfire and also dies.

The final scene shows Miguel on top of the apartment rooftop, taking out a dead cockroach from Elisa's collection, placing it on the edge of the fence as he mourns the death of his two friends.

== Cast ==
- Sherlyn González as Elisa
- Imanol Landeta as Miguel
- Rubén Rojo Aura as Paco
- Dino García as Elisa's father
- Susana Zabaleta as Elisa's mother
- Carlos Torres Torrija as Gómez

== Awards and nominations ==
Elisa Before the End of the World was nominated to seven Ariel Awards, winning one: Best Sound. The film won the Audience Award at the 12th Guadalajara International Film Festival.

| Organization | Category/Award | Recipient(s) | Result | Ref |
|---|---|---|---|---|
| Ariel Awards | Best Film | Televicine | Nominated | |
| Ariel Awards | Best Director | Juan Antonio de la Riva | Nominated | |
| Ariel Awards | Best Actress | Sherlyn González | Nominated | |
| Ariel Awards | Best Original Screenplay | Paula Markovitch | Nominated | |
| Ariel Awards | Best Set Decoration | Ángeles Martínez and Alberto Villaseñor | Nominated | |
| Ariel Awards | Best Special Effects | Alejandro Vázquez | Nominated | |
| Ariel Awards | Best Sound | Miguel Sandoval and Nerio Barberis | Won | |
| Guadalajara International Film Festival | Audience Award | Juan Antonio de la Riva | Won | |
