= ¿Es neta, Eva? =

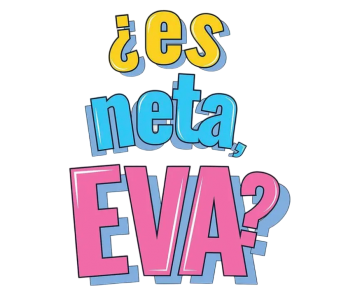
- Genre: Sitcom
- Written by: Enrique González; Elías Solorio; Jorge Garza; Martha García; Mary Carillo; Salvador Solorio; Pepe Sierra; Julio Reyes
- Directed by: Jorge Garza
- Starring: Mayrín Villanueva
- Country of origin: Mexico
- Original language: Spanish
- No. of seasons: 2
- No. of episodes: 24

Production
- Executive producer: Elías Solorio
- Producers: Luis Felipe Santamaría; Mary Carmen Carillo
- Production company: TelevisaUnivision

Original release
- Network: Las Estrellas
- Release: 18 April 2023 – 2 July 2024

¿Es neta, Eva? is a Mexican sitcom television series produced by Elías Solorio for TelevisaUnivision. It premiered on Las Estrellas on 18 April 2023. The series follows a recently divorced mother who must adapt to her new reality and raise her three children. Mayrín Villanueva stars in the title role. The second season premiered on 16 April 2024.

== Cast ==
- Mayrín Villanueva as Eva Cordero
- Rodrigo Ríos as Daniel
- Romina Martínez as Renata
- Nashla Aguilar as Alejandra
- Pablo Valentín as Antonio
- Melissa Palacio as Miranda (season 1)
- Verania Luken as Anita
- Alejandro de Marino as Borja (season 1)
- Luis José Sevilla as Víctor
- Paloma Cedeño as Tania Reyes
- Pedro Sicard as Eduardo Guerra
- Camila Romeo as Mónica
- Eduardo Santamarina as Adán Castillo (season 2)
- Raquel Garza as Tere "La Secretaria" (season 2)
- Carlos Bonavides as Chema (season 2)
- Giselle Fuentes as Jessica (season 2)

== Episodes ==
=== Series overview ===
Series	Episodes	Originally released	
Series	Episodes	First released	Last released
1	12	18 April 2023	11 July 2023
2	12	16 April 2024	2 July 2024

=== Season 1 (2023) ===
No. overall	No. in season	Title	Original release date
1	1	"El nuevo jefe"	18 April 2023
2	2	"Centré al jefe"	25 April 2023
3	3	"Deudas y más deudas"	2 May 2023
4	4	"Día sin clases"	9 May 2023
5	5	"Un novio para Alejandra"	16 May 2023
6	6	"Rescate animal"	23 May 2023
7	7	"Malas calificaciones"	30 May 2023
8	8	"Cotorreando con Tony"	13 June 2023
9	9	"Mi primera fiesta"	20 June 2023
10	10	"Pole Dance"	27 June 2023
11	11	"Día del Padre"	4 July 2023
12	12	"Cita doble"	11 July 2023

=== Season 2 (2024) ===
No. overall	No. in season	Title	Original release date
13	1	"Director adjunto"	16 April 2024
14	2	"Reconciliación"	23 April 2024
15	3	"Elevador"	30 April 2024
16	4	"Se quema la base"	7 May 2024
17	5	"Video casette"	14 May 2024
18	6	"La mamá de mi Ex"	21 May 2024
19	7	"Cumple de Eva"	28 May 2024
20	8	"El chismógrafo godín"	4 June 2024
21	9	"En lo oscurito"	11 June 2024
22	10	"El padre postizo del hijo de Eva"	18 June 2024
23	11	"Ses in the office"	25 June 2024
24	12	"El Ex arrepentido"	2 July 2024

== Production ==
Production of the series began on 12 September 2022. Filming of the second season began on 15 January 2024.
