= Sherlyn González =

Mexican actress

Sherlyn
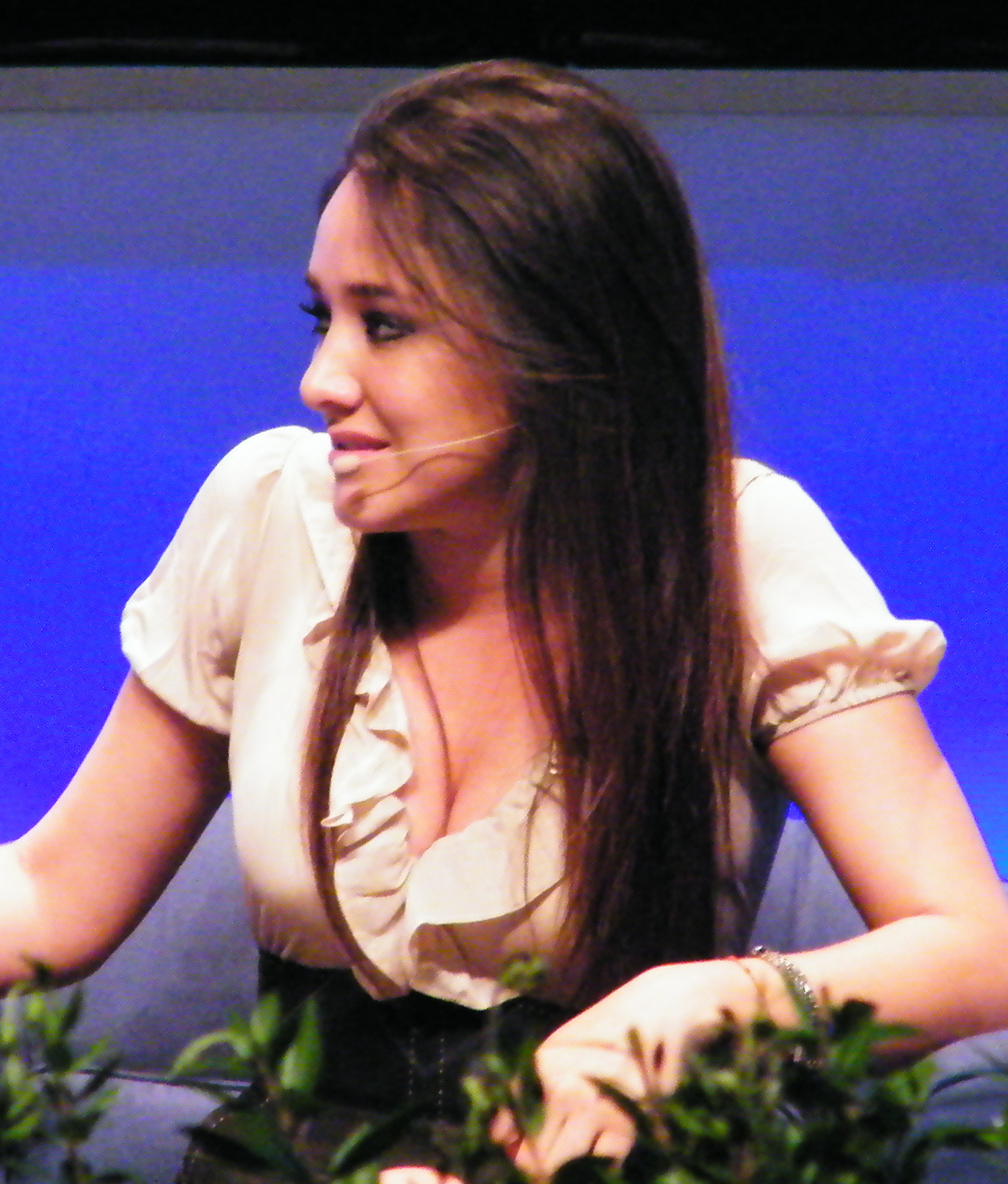
- González in 2010
- Born: Sherlyn Montserrat González Díaz; 14 October 1985 (age 41); Guadalajara, Jalisco, Mexico
- Occupations: Actress, singer
- Years active: 1993–present
- Children: 1

Sherlyn Montserrat González Díaz (born 14 October 1985), known simply as Sherlyn, is a Mexican actress.

== Biography ==
Sherlyn showed a passion for music at a young age. After winning a local contest called Vamos a jugar y cantar, she joined a children-oriented group called K.I.D.S., with fellow Mexican singers Dulce María and Fuzz. K.I.D.S.' second album, En el principio, was released, and they participated in a tribute album to Pope John Paul II, titled El pescador.

Sherlyn later began acting in telenovelas. She acted as piojito or Sofía in Marisol. She starred in Clase 406 with Alfonso Herrera, Anahí and Christian Chávez and later starred in Alborada, alongside Lucero. She was cast as Sandy in the Mexican version of Vaselina (Grease), alongside her ex-boyfriend, Aarón Díaz. She was one of the candidates to star as Nessarose in the Mexican version of Wicked but lost the role to Daniela Lujan.

In 2008, she began starring as Rocio in Cuidado con el ángel, alongside William Levy, Maite Perroni and Laura Zapata.

On 27 July 2009 the telenovela Camaleones premiered in Mexico in which she stars in with Irvin "Pee Wee" Salinas, Belinda and Alfonso Herrera. She was then part of the band of the same name while the novela was on air.

In 2010, she was part of the stage play Agosto, worked as a presenter for the TV show Hoy Sábado, and played Ana López in Una familia con suerte. She also acted in the Telehit series Hoy soy nadie (2012), and starred in the novela Amores Verdaderos (2013). She returned to television in 2015, playing Magos in Antes muerta que Lichita.

== Filmography ==
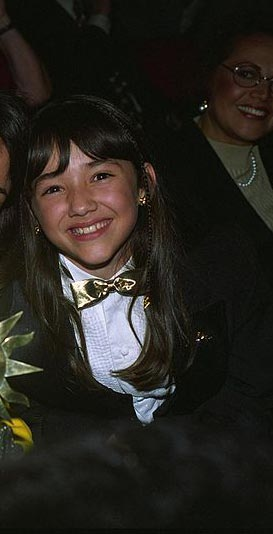
González at the 1997 XII Mexican Film Festival in Guadalajara

=== Film ===
Year	Title	Role	Notes
1993	Zapatos viejos	Mary	
1996	Profundo carmesí	Teresa	
1997	Elisa Before the End of the World	Elisa	
1998	Campo de ortigas	Penelope	Video
1998	Cilantro y perejil	Mariana	
1999	La segunda noche	Laura	
2001	Serafín: La película	Elisa	
2002	Juego de Niños	Teresa	Short film
2005	Una de balazos	Assassin	Video short
2008	Llamando a un ángel		
2009	Sabel Redemption	Vanish	
2009	Nikté	Nikté	Voice only
2012	Todas mías	Guadalupe	
2020	The Dutchess of Cancun		

=== Television ===
Year	Title	Role	Notes
1994	Los papás de mis papás		
1994–1995	Agujetas de color de rosa	Clarita	
1996	Marisol	Sofía "Piojito" Garcés del Valle	
1997–1998	Huracán	Daniela	
1999	Amor Gitano		
2000	Mi destino eres tú	Georgina "Gina" San Vicente	
2001	Mujer bonita	Milagros	TV mini-series
2001	La intrusa	María de la Cruz "Maricruz" Roldán Limantur	
2001-2002	El juego de la vida		Season 1, Episode 165
2002–2003	Clase 406	Gabriela Chávez	
2004	Corazones al límite	Concepción "Conny" Pérez Ávila	
2005	Alborada	Marina	
2006–2007	Ugly Betty	Lourdes	"Queens for a Day" (Season 1, Episode 3) "In or Out" (Season 1, Episode 13) "I'm Coming Out" (Season 1, Episode 14)
2007	Amor sin maquillaje	Romina	
2008	Fuego en la sangre	Libia Ana Reyes	
2008	Los simuladores		"Los impresentables" (Season 1, Episode 6)
2008–2009	Cuidado con el ángel	Rocío San Roman	
2009	Mujeres asesinas	Laura Mendoza	"Laura, confundida" (Season 2, Episode 3)
2009–2010	Camaleones	Solange Ponce de León	Co-lead role
2011	Una familia con suerte	Ana López Torrés	Co-lead role
2012	Hoy soy nadie	Mia Castillo	
2012–2013	Amores verdaderos	Liliana Arriaga	Co-lead Role
2015–2016	Antes muerta que Lichita	Magos	Co-lead role
2016	Netas Divinas	Herself	Host
2021	¿Qué le pasa a mi familia?	Jade Castillo Jaurello	Main cast

== Awards and nominations ==
=== Premios TVyNovelas ===
Year	Category	Telenovela	Result
2003	Best Female Revelation	Clase 406	Nominated
2006	Best Young Lead Actress	Alborada	Nominated
2014	Best Young Lead Actress	Amores verdaderos	Won
