= Carlos Marcovich =

Mexican filmmaker (born 1963)

Carlos Marcovich (born March 20, 1963) is a director, editor, photographer and producer of Mexican cinema. Born in Buenos Aires, Argentina, he came with his family to Mexico on April 1, 1976. In 2011 he became a naturalized Mexican.

== Education and early career ==
Marcovich studied at the National Autonomous University of Mexico from 1982 to 1987. Marcovichs career started as a photographer in Camino largo a Tijuana (1987) and Intimidad (1989). Among other films for which he has been director of photography are Ciudad de ciegos (1991), Desiertos mares (1992), Dos crímenes (1993), Midaq Alley (1995), Salón México (1995) and others. His first movie as a director, Who the Hell Is Juliette? (1997), has been the most watched Mexican documentary in the world and winner of 17 national and international awards including: "Best Picture America" at the 1998 Sundance Film Festival and Opera Prima Arieles Edition '98. He has directed 17 music videos including "Tonto corazón" by Benny Ibarra which inspired him to make the film Who the Hell Is Juliette?

In 2003 he worked with Rodrigo Prieto on the photography of the American documentary Comandante by director Oliver Stone, for which he synthesized 30 hours of interviews with Cuban president Fidel Castro. This film was followed by Looking for Fidel (2004). In 2006, he premiered the documentary Cuatro labios, directed and edited by Carlos Marcovich. In 2008, he accompanied the group Timbiriche throughout their tour recording the documentary La misma piedra.

== Filmography ==
=== Photography director ===
- La otra familia, (2010)
- Comandante, (2008)
- South of the border, (2003)
- Salón México, (1995)
- Midaq Alley, (1995)
- Sucesos Distantes, (2003)
- Dos Crímenes, (1994)
- Desiertos Mares(1993)
- Extraños Caminos (1993)
- Ciudad de Ciegos (1991)
- Intimidad (1989)
- Camino largo a Tijuana (1988)

=== Music videos ===
- "Guerras perdidas", Bacilos (2005)
- "No me voy", OV7 (2003)
- "Mientes tan bien", Sin Bandera (2003)
- "Cielo", Benny Ibarra (2002)
- "Quien cuidará de mi", Myriam Hernandez (2000)
- "Una ilusión", Kabah (1999)
- "Cada mañana", Benny Ibarra (1996)
- "Te Daría Mi Vida", Paulina Rubio (1995)
- "Nada De Ti", Paulina Rubio (1995
- "La malquerida", Angela Carrasco (1995)
- "Amandote", Lorenzo Antonio (1995)
- "Afuera", Caifanes (1994)
- "Aquí no es así", Caifanes (1994)
- "Esta aventura", Emanuel (1994)
- "Tonto corazón", Benny Ibarra (1993)
- "En mis sueños", André (1993)
- "Me rompiste el amor", André (1993)
- "Sacude tu corazón", Cecilia Toussaint (1993)

=== Documentaries ===
- Cuatro labios, (2005)
- La misma piedra (2008)
- Who the Hell Is Juliette? (1997)
