= Un secreto de Esperanza =

- Directed by: Leopoldo Laborde
- Written by: Leopoldo Laborde
- Produced by: Moises Jafif
- Starring: Katy Jurado; Ana de la Reguera; Imanol; María Karunna Hill
- Distributed by: Buena Vista International
- Release date: 2002
- Running time: 120 minutes
- Country: Mexico
- Language: Spanish

Un secreto de Esperanza (released under A Beautiful Secret in English-speaking countries) is a 2002 Mexican film written and directed by Leopoldo Laborde and starring Katy Jurado, Imanol, Jaime Aymerich and Ana de la Reguera. It is an example of a cinematic homage for the last screen appearance of Katy Jurado. This film captures the magical realism of Mexico as well as telling a genuinely touching tale about the unlikeliest of friendships.

It won several awards in film festivals around the world.

== See also ==
- A Rumor of Angels
