= Academia Mexicana de Artes y Ciencias Cinematográficas =

Professional honorary organization

Mexican Academy of Film Arts and Sciences
- Abbreviation: AMACC
- Formation: July 3, 1946; 80 years ago
- Type: Film organization
- Headquarters: Mexico City, Mexico
- President: Mónica Lozano Serrano
- Website: https://www.amacc.org.mx/

The Mexican Academy of Film Arts and Sciences (Spanish: Academia Mexicana de Artes y Ciencias Cinematográficas, AMACC) is a professional honorary organization founded on July 3, 1946, in Mexico City to promote the dissemination, research, preservation, development, and defense of the cinematographic arts and sciences. Currently, the president of the AMACC is producer Mónica Lozano Serrano.

The AMACC is committed to making Mexican cinema known and valued in Mexico and abroad. It organizes meetings between filmmakers, annually rewards the films exhibited during each year, in addition to publishing books that talk about the development of the Mexican film industry, and participates in the conservation of cinematographic works in Mexico. At the same time, it defends the creative and labor freedom of Mexican filmmakers from censorship and labor grievances.

The AMACC is endorsed by the cinematographic trajectory of its members and by their willingness to selflessly defend the present and the future of Mexican cinema.

== History ==
The following people were present before a notary public during the signing of the document:

- Celestino Gorostiza, screenwriter and director
- Felipe Gregorio Castillo, cinematographer
- Raúl de Anda, producer
- Carlos Carriedo Galván, lawyer
- César Santos Galindo, lawyer
- Fernando Soler, actor
- Manuel Fontanals, scenographer
- Ignacio Fernández Esperón "Tata Nacho", composer
- Eduardo Hernández Moncada, pianist and composer
- Oswaldo Diaz Rúanova, journalist
- Fernando Morales Ortiz, journalist
- Eugenio Maldonado, lawyer
- José María Sánchez García, journalist
- Antonio Castro Leal, lawyer
- Adela Formoso de Obregón Santacilia film instructor
- Carlos Pellicer, screenwriter
- Alejandro Galindo, director and screenwriter
- Juán Manuel Torrea
- Jorge Fernández, scenographer
- Francisco de P. Cabrera, producer
- Ángel Garasa Bergés, actor
- Adolfo Fernández Bustamante, director
- Gabriel Figueroa cinematographer, among others.

This was a moment where the movie industry in Mexico was going through its peak. The year before, alone, 85 movies had been made, a record figure even today. The purpose of creating the Academy was to promote advancements in the arts and sciences of film-making, as well as to give public recognition and to outstanding film productions and promote future research.

In practice, however, most of the efforts of the Academy went on to recognize the best films with its award: the Ariel. Every year, from 1947 to 1958, the Ariel was awarded. After 1958 the number of productions fell considerably and it was not until 1972 when the ceremony was held again, and it has every year until the present year.

== Current Administration ==
| Office | Incumbent | Profession | Ref |
|---|---|---|---|
| President | Mónica Lozano Serrano | Producer | |
| Vice President | Marina Stavenhagen | Screenwriter | |
| Secretary | Flavio González Mello | Director | |
| Treasurer | Rodrigo Herranz | Producer | |
| General Council | Ernesto Contreras | Director | |
| General Council | Everardo González | Director | |
| General Council | Lucía Gajá | Director | |
| General Council | Nerio Barberis | Sound Designer | |
| Supervision and Surveillance Commission | Guadalupe Ferrer | Cultural manager Producer | |
| Supervision and Surveillance Commission | Jorge Michel Grau | Director | |
| Supervision and Surveillance Commission | Leticia Huijara | Actress | |

== Members ==
Active members

1. Mónica Lozano Serrano
2. Marina Stavenhagen Vargas
3. Flavio González Mello
4. Rodrigo Herranz Fanjul
5. Ernesto Contreras Flores
6. Everardo González
7. Lucía Gajá Ferrer
8. Nerio Barberis Occhione
9. Guadalupe Ferrer Andrade
10. Jorge Michel Grau
11. Leticia Huijara
12. Adela Cortázar
13. Alberto Cortés
14. Alejandro García
15. Arcelia Ramírez
16. Armando Casas Pérez
17. Axel Muñoz
18. Bárbara Enríquez
19. Daniel Hidalgo
20. Francisco Vargas
21. Francisco X. Rivera
22. Gloria Carrasco
23. Guillermo Granillo
24. Ignacio Ortiz
25. Inna Payán
26. Isabel Muñoz Cota
27. Jorge Zárate
28. José Sefami
29. Juan Carlos Colombo
30. Juan José Saravia
31. Karina Gidi
32. Kenya Márquez Alkadif Cortés
33. Laura Imperiale
34. Mariana Rodríguez
35. Mariestela Fernández
36. Miguel Hernández
37. Nicolás Echevarría
38. Omar Guzmán
39. Roberto Fiesco
40. Samuel Larson
41. Serguei Saldívar Tanaka
42. Sofía Carrillo
43. Tatiana Huezo
44. Verónica Langer
45. Víctor Ugalde

Emeritus Members

1. Bertha Navarro
2. Blanca Guerra
3. Carlos Carrera
4. Diana Bracho
5. Dolores Heredia
6. Ernesto Gómez Cruz
7. Felipe Cazals
8. Jorge Fons
9. Jorge Sánchez Sosa
10. Juan Antonio de la Riva
11. Lucía Álvarez
12. Toni Kuhn

Honorary Members

1. Centro de Capacitación Cinematográfica, represented by Alfredo Loaeza
2. Cineteca Nacional, represented by Alejandro Pelayo
3. Dirección General de Actividades Cinematográficas – Filmoteca de la UNAM, represented by Hugo Villa Smythe
4. Escuela Nacional de Artes Cinematográficas (UNAM), represented by Manuel López Monroy
5. Fernando Pérez Gavilán
