= Kassandra (TV series) =

Venezuelan television series

- Genre: Telenovela
- Based on: Peregrina by Delia Fiallo
- Written by: Delia Fiallo
- Directed by: Grazio D'Angelo; Olegario Barrera
- Starring: Coraima Torres; Osvaldo Ríos; Henry Soto
- Theme music composer: Jose Antonio Bordell
- Opening theme: Kassandra by Jose Antonio Bordell
- Country of origin: Venezuela
- Original language: Spanish
- No. of episodes: 150

Production
- Executive producers: Omar Pin; Alberto Giarocco
- Producer: Hernando Faria
- Production locations: Mucuchíes, Mérida
- Production company: Radio Caracas Televisión (RCTV)

Original release
- Network: RCTV
- Release: 8 October 1992 – 11 May 1993

Related
- Peregrina (2005)

Kassandra is a Venezuelan telenovela written by Delia Fiallo and produced by Radio Caracas Televisión (RCTV). It is a remake of the 1973 telenovela Peregrina created and also written by Fiallo. The story revolves around a young woman, Kassandra who grows up in a traveling circus among Romani people. She thinks she is one of them, not knowing that she is in fact the granddaughter of a rich landowner whose stepson she falls desperately in love with.

The series has 150 episodes that were first broadcast between 8 October 1992 and 11 May 1993 on RCTV, and it achieved a worldwide success. It was extremely successful in its later airings, especially in the United States, Romania, Greece, Italy, Spain, Russia, Mongolia, Philippines, former Eastern Bloc nations, Yugoslavia and Bulgaria, as well as the Middle East, South Asia, and East Asia.

Coraima Torres, Osvaldo Ríos starred as protagonists, with Henry Soto, Nury Flores, Alexander Milic, Loly Sánchez, Erika Medina, and also Osvaldo Ríos as the antagonists.

== Synopsis ==
The action begins twenty years prior to the actual plot, when a travelling circus sets up on the outskirts of Caracas. Andreina Arocha (born on 19 March 1955, died on 25 November 1974) the daughter of a wealthy landowner, is awestruck by the clowns, the wild animals, and a Gypsy fortuneteller who relates wonderful things the future has in store. Unbeknownst to Andreina, the fortuneteller actually sees a tragic destiny for her and something mysterious forewarns that their paths will meet again. One year later when the circus returns, Andreina has died of a terminal illness after giving birth to a baby girl. At the same time, Andreina's stepmother, Herminia, an unscrupulous and overly-ambitious woman, discovers that a Gypsy from the circus and her newborn have died during childbirth. Herminia, who has twin sons from a previous marriage and wants them to be sole heirs to the Arocha fortune, plots a devious plan and carries it out with the help of a hired hand. One dark night, he follows Herminia's orders to exchange the infants. In the crib, the lifeless body of the infant Gypsy replaces Andreina's healthy child who in turn is given to the Gypsies. The next day, the circus packs up and leaves town.

Years go by. Finally, one day the circus returns and so does Kassandra, who has grown to be a beautiful young woman. According to Gypsy tradition, the woman who raised Kassandra, her supposed grandmother, promised her hand in matrimony when she was an infant to Randu, a rough young man who is now the leader of the tribe.

During the first night of the Gypsies' arrival to town, Kassandra's eyes wander to another man. Their eyes meet and become locked in a strong mutual attraction. The man who stares is Luis David, one of Herminia's twin sons. Later the two talk below the starry sky, in the loneliness of the mountainside where they share a magical moment. The following day however, Luis David leaves town without a word.

Not long after, his twin brother Ignacio discovers that Kassandra is the true heir to the Arocha fortune and he tricks her into marrying him. The first night of their fateful honeymoon, Ignacio is mysteriously killed by his maid Rosaura, otherwise Kassandra who didn't know anything about the murder,,decided to left him. In an effort to discover his brother's assassin, Luis David returns and assumes Ignacio's identity. His suspicions fall on Kassandra, the beautiful young gypsy who knew her husband so briefly and who now believes that Luis David is her husband.

== Cast ==
- Coraima Torres as Andreina Arocha de Rangel/Kassandra la gitana/Kassandra Rangel Arocha/Kassandra Rangel de Contreras
- Osvaldo Ríos as Ignacio Contreras/Luis David Contreras
- Henry Soto as Randu
- Raul Xiques as Alfonso Arocha
- Carmencita Padron as Ofelia Alonso
- Nury Flores as Herminia Arocha
- Esperanza Magaz as Dorinda
- Carlos Arreaza as Tomas
- Alexander Milic as Matias Osorio
- Hylene Rodriguez as Lilia Rosa Alonso
- André Filipe as Transformista Barato
- Ivan Tamayo as Hector Quintero
- Loly Sanchez as Rosaura Osorio
- Fernando Flores as Simon
- Veronica Cortez as Yaritza
- Juan Frankis as Marcelino
- Erika Medina as Isabel
- Rafael Romero as Glinka
- Cecilia Villarreal as Gema Salazar
- Roberto Moll as Manrique Alonso
- Mimi Sills as Elvira Alonso
- Manuel Escolano as Roberto Alonso
- Miguel de León as Ernesto Rangel
- Saul Martinez as Doctor
- Nelly Prigoryan as Verushka
- Lupe Barrado
- Ron Duarte
- Pedro Duran as Calunga
- Eduardo Gadea Perez as Judge
- Margarita Hernandez as Norma De Castro
- Maria Hinojosa
- Felix Landaeta as Lic. Carrion
- Frank Moreno
- Julio Mujica
- Jose Oliva as Lic. Olivera
- Carlos Omana
