= Sueños y caramelos =

Mexican telenovela

- Genre: Telenovela
- Created by: Abel Santa Cruz
- Written by: Lourdes Barrios; Dolores Ortega; Denisse Pfeiffer; Ricardo Tejeda
- Directed by: Lily Garza; Karina Duprez; Juan Carlos Bonet
- Starring: Alessandra Rosaldo; René Strickler; María Antonieta de las Nieves; Manuel Saval; Nora Salinas
- Opening theme: Es tiempo de jugar by Alessandra Rosaldo
- Ending theme: Sueños y Caramelos by Alessandra Rosaldo
- Country of origin: Mexico
- Original language: Spanish
- No. of episodes: 135

Production
- Executive producer: Carlos Moreno Laguillo
- Producer: Hilda Santaella Hernández
- Production locations: Filming; Televisa San Ángel; Mexico City, Mexico
- Cinematography: Alfredo Sánchez; Óscar Morales
- Camera setup: Multi-camera
- Running time: 41-44 minutes
- Production company: Televisa

Original release
- Network: Canal de las Estrellas
- Release: January 24 – July 29, 2005

Related
- La Pícara Soñadora (1991)

Sueños y Caramelos (English title: Sweets and Dreams) is a Mexican telenovela produced by Carlos Moreno Laguillo for Televisa in 2005. It is a remake of La Pícara Soñadora.

On January 24, 2005, Canal de las Estrellas started broadcasting Sueños y caramelos weekdays at 4:00pm, replacing Misión S.O.S. The last episode was broadcast on July 29, 2005, with Pablo y Andrea replacing it the following Monday.

Alessandra Rosaldo and René Strickler starred as adult protagonists, Nashla Aguilar and Luciano Corigliano starred as young protagonists, while Elizabeth Álvarez, Patricia Navidad and Pablo Magallanes starred as antagonists.

== Plot ==
Since she lost her mother at 3 years of age, little Sofía has lived with her grandfather, Don Gonzalo, who is the security chief of a great department store called El Gran Almacén (Liverpool). Sofía is a girl with an extraordinary imagination that has a secret world.

As her apartment is inside the store, Sofia can enter it at night, when all employers have gone home. Here, in different departments, she begins living adventures with her friends.

== Cast ==
- Alessandra Rosaldo as Fátima Goméz
- René Strickler as Rafael Monraz Guillén
- Nashla Aguilar as Sofía Ramírez
- María Antonieta de las Nieves as Antonieta Guillén de Monraz
- Manuel Saval as Augusto Monraz Guillén
- Elizabeth Álvarez as Rocío de los Santos
- Natalia Juárez as Lucía "Lucy" del Pilar Jurado
- Miguel Pérez as Pedro/Guillermo "Memo"
- Patricia Navidad as Débora León
- Nora Salinas as Guadalupe "Lupita"
- Pablo Magallanes as Romeo
- Óscar Bonfiglio as Carlo
- Roberto Blandón as André San Martín/Andres Martínez
- Alejandro Ibarra as Oswaldo Nerin
- Luis Gatica as Máximo Guerra
- Gloria Izaguirre as Miroslava
- Raquel Morell as Rosaura
- María Alicia Delgado as Ady

== Soundtrack ==
The soundtrack from the telenovela was released in 2005. The labels were Capitol Records, EMI and Televisa. It was produced by Chacho Gaytán, Xavier Asalí, Mauricio L. Arriaga and Jorge Eduardo Murguía. The following songs were included:

1. Es Tiempo de Jugar
2. Gran Día
3. El Gallinero
4. La Tabla del 7
5. Maniquie
6. Los Modales
7. Así Son Mis Amigos
8. El Zorrito Pinto
9. Payasos
10. El Juego del Rock
11. La Princesa y el Bufón
12. Chiki Tiki Wong

== Awards ==
| Year | Award | Category | Nominee | Result |
|---|---|---|---|---|
| 2006 | 24th TVyNovelas Awards | Best Leading Actor | Raúl Padilla "Choforo" | Nominated |
| 2006 | 24th TVyNovelas Awards | Best Child Performance | Macarena Miguel | Nominated |
| 2006 | 24th TVyNovelas Awards | Best Child Performance | Nashla Aguilar | Nominated |
| 2006 | 24th TVyNovelas Awards | Best Direction | Lilí Garza; Karina Duprez | Nominated |
