= Who the Hell Is Juliette? =

1997 film by Carlos Marcovich

Who the Hell is Juliette?
- Directed by: Carlos Marcovich
- Written by: Carlos Marcovich
- Produced by: Alameda Films, Simon Bross
- Starring: Yuliet Ortega; Fabiola Quiroz; Jorge Quiroz; Victor Ortega; Michele Ortega
- Distributed by: Kino International
- Release date: 5 September 1997 (TIFF)
- Running time: 91 minutes
- Country: Mexico
- Language: Spanish with English subtitles

Who the Hell is Juliette? (Spanish: ¿Quién diablos es Juliette?) is a Mexican 1997 documentary film written and directed by Carlos Marcovich. The film is about Yuliet Ortega, a teenage prostitute who lives in Havana, Cuba and Fabiola Quiroz, a Mexican model. The film was shot in Cuba, Mexico, and the United States.

== Plot ==
Who the Hell is Juliette? begins with Yuliet Ortega saying that her name on the title card, "Juliette Ortega", is misspelled and demanding that it is corrected. The director immediately complies and the card is corrected to "Yuliet Ortega". Ortega is a 16-year-old girl who is being taken care of by her grandmother. Her mother committed suicide, while her father left the family and went to the United States. Ortega became a jinetera to support herself.

During the shooting of a music video, Ortega meets 23-year-old Fabiola Quiroz who is a Mexican model. Both Quiroz and Ortega have been abandoned by their fathers and are deeply scarred by what has happened.

Director Carlos Marcovich organizes a reunion for Ortega and her father, who lives in New Jersey. Finally, to save Ortega from street prostitution, Fabiola Quiroz helps her arrange a modeling interview.

Salma Hayek and Francesco Clemente make guest appearances in the documentary.

== Production ==
Marcovich met Fabiola Quiroz during the shooting of a music video. He met Yuliet Ortega in Cuba and decided that she would be the younger sister of Quiroz in the music video. Marcovich features the similarities of the two women: green eyes and persistent thoughts about their absent fathers. After shooting the music video, he filmed the two women over a period of three years and created the film, Who the Hell is Juliette?

Marcovich intentionally misspelled the title character, "Yuliet Ortega", as "Juliette Ortega" in the credits.

== Reception ==
=== Critical reaction ===
Entertainment Weekly called the film the "artiest home movie ever made" and was critical about how the subtitles appeared and disappeared too quickly to be easily read. On the other hand, the New York Daily News called the film "a great example of what happens when a film maker follows a subject that intrigues him rather than a pre-set program".

=== Awards ===
The documentary received two Ariel Awards. At the 1998 Sundance Film Festival, it received the Latin American Cinema Award.
