= Leopoldo Laborde =

Mexican film director

Leopoldo Laborde (born November 6, 1970) is a Mexican film director, screenwriter, photographer, editor and self-made producer.

Laborde entered the movie business in 1984 as a production assistant in Mexico City. From 1988 to 1995, starting with El gato, he shot four feature films on home-video and developed his skills as a storyteller as well as his cinematic visual aesthetics, namely with Utopía 7. In 1997, he began his professional career in 35-millimeter film format with Angeluz, a horror film, released at the 1998 Guadalajara International Film Festival. Despite the criticisms, upon his return to Mexico City, he wrote and shot Sin destino and Un secreto de Esperanza, throughout 1999 to 2002. The starring actors were, respectively, Roberto Cobo and Katy Jurado, these two films being the last acting performances they gave. Sin destino is known as “a key piece in raw realism”, and Un secreto de Esperanza won twelve awards in film festivals around the world. Laborde also alternated with other works in digital video format, such as Cuerpo prestado, La repetición and Los tréboles no pueden soñar, throughout 2000 to 2004. During 2005, he wrote, edited and directed Enemigo, this time with debutant performers, and in 2007, Un hombre y su morada interior.

Laborde is known for his particular vision and great versatility in movie styles.

== Filmography ==
- Cuatro paredes (2010)
- Recuerdos olvidados (in post-production since 2009)
- La puerta (in post-production since 2008)
- Enemigo (in post-production since 2007), started in 2005
- Un secreto de Esperanza (2002), also known as A Beautiful Secret (International: English title)
- Sin destino (2002), also known as Without Destiny
- Cuerpo prestado (2001)
- Recompensa (2000), or 72 horas, aired in 1999
- Inesperado amor (1999), aired in 1999
- Angeluz (1998), also known as Angel of Light
- La extraña presencia (1995)
- El libro de la selva... de asfalto (1995)
- Utopía 7 (1995)
- Juego de niños (1995), also known as A Child's Play, aired in 1994
- Perseguido (1993) (V), also known as Chased, aired in 1993
- Nathael (1993)
- El gato (1992), started in 1988

== Connections ==
- Roberto Trujillo (born on July 8, 1979): head of Utopía 7 Films, the production company for several of Laborde's films
  - for technical credit (including producer) only: Cuatro paredes, Recuerdos olvidados, Enemigo, Juego de niños
  - for performance credit only: Inesperado amor^{★} (Roberto), Angeluz^{★} (Miguel), La extraña presencia^{★} (the presence), Utopía 7† (Capitán Tigre), Perseguido^{★} (Fernando)
  - for both: Un secreto de Esperanza (boyfriend) and Sin destino (client)
  - also producer of films without Laborde, such as El hombre perfecto, Mi media naranja and Paulina and Fran
- Marilú Carrillo: producer, agent, set hand or cast member of five Laborde films
  - for technical credit only: Sin destino, Inesperado amor and Nathael
  - for performance credit or more: Juego de niños (Dr. Montemar) and Perseguido (la Medussa)
  - also party to films without Laborde, such as casting for 12 segundos
- Nelly Godoy: agent or cast member of four Laborde films:
  - for technical credit only: Sin destino and Juego de niños
  - for performance credit or more: Angeluz (Dr. Henriquez), Perseguido and Nathael
- Gloria Ruíz: producer, manager or agent of four Laborde films:
  - Inesperado amor, Angeluz, Utopía 7 and Juego de niños
  - also party to films without Laborde, such as writing and producing Padres culpables

Laborde (Omicrón Films) and Trujillo (Utopía 7 Films) have had something of a troupe, throughout their careers, the actors being:

- Francisco Rey, in Sin destino^{★} (Fran), Utopía 7† (el Mudo) and Juego de niños^{★} (Lalo), credited as Francisco Ruíz in the latter two
- Sheilla Lissette, in Cuatro Paredes^{★}, Juego de niños (the sister) and El gato
- David Valdez, in Sin destino^{★} (David), Utopía 7† and Angeluz (street kid)
- Alain Rangel, in Juego de niños^{★} (Miguel) and La extraña presencia
- Rogelio Castillo, in Utopía 7† and Juego de niños (the brother)
- José Luis Badillo, in Inesperado amor, Angeluz (Luis), Utopía 7† and Perseguido (Polo); also in a film without Laborde, namely Padres culpables

^{★} lead performance and protagonist played (including antagonist)
† performance as member of a team of protagonists

In addition to starring in Sin destino, as Sebastian; Roberto Cobo had a minor part in Un secreto de Esperanza, as Melquíades, the groundskeeper for Esperanza's home. And one Mariana Gajá, a character actress but star of Sin ton ni Sonia, played the blonde object of sexual or romantic fixation of the protagonist, both in Sin destino and Un secreto de Esperanza, respectively as Angelica and Madonnita. She and Sheilla Lissette bear some resemblance.

== See also ==
- Roberto Trujillo on Spanish Wikipedia
- Inesperado amor on Spanish Wikipedia
- Inesperado Amor on Portuguese Wikipedia
