= Te Daría Mi Vida =

Single by Paulina Rubio

from the album El Tiempo Es Oro
- Released: 17 January 1995
- Recorded: Balu-Balu Estudios, (Madrid, Spain)
- Genre: Dance-pop
- Length: 4:11
- Label: EMI Latin; Virgin
- Songwriters: Carlos Sánchez; César Valle
- Producer: Miguel Blasco

Paulina Rubio singles chronology
"Asunto De Dos" (1994)	"Te Daría Mi Vida" (1995)	"Nada De Ti" (1995)

Music video
- "Te Daría Mi Vida" on YouTube

"Te Daría Mi Vida" (I Would Give You My Life) is a song by Mexican singer Paulina Rubio, taken from her third studio album El Tiempo Es Oro (1995), written by Carlos Sánchez and César Valle and produced by Miguel Blasco. The song was released as the album's lead single on 17 January 1995 by EMI Music. "Te Daría Mi Vida" is a dance-pop song and allegedly sold more than 140,000 copies in Mexico and the United States. The accompanying music video for the single was directed by Carlos Marcovich and was filmed in Xochimilco and the Estudios Churubusco in Mexico.

== Composition ==
"Te Daría Mi Vida" is a dance-pop song that lasts for four minutes and 13 seconds.

== Commercial performance ==
The single reached number six in the airplay charts of San Salvador. According to Rubio, "Te Daría Mi Vida" sold 140,000 copies in Mexico and the United States.

== Music video ==
The accompanying music video for "Te Daría Mi Vida" was directed by Carlos Marcovich and was filmed in Xochimilco and in the Estudios Churubusco in Mexico, using 27 different scenarios. It was choreographed by Miguel Sahagún. The music video starts with a bottle in the sea with a phrase that says "Dear Paulina" in which there are some mariachis playing the chorus of the song, Paulina is walking and gets on a plane, and then she gets off and starts singing the song. It features guest appearances by Raúl de Molina and Edith González.

== Track listing and formats ==
These are the formats and track listings of major single releases of "Te Daría Mi Vida".

- Mexico CD, Single, Promo
1. "Te Daría Mi vida" – 4:11
- Spain CD, Single, Promo
1. "Te Daría Mi vida" – 4:11
- US CD Single, Remixes
1. "Te Daría Mi vida" (Album Version)" – 4:12
2. "Te Daría Mi vida" (Big Mix)" – 6:26
3. "Te Daría Mi vida" (Radio Mix)" – 4:30
4. "Te Daría Mi vida" (Dub Mix) - 7:50

== See also ==
- List of one-shot music videos
