= Pobre Niña Rica (song) =

Single by Paulina Rubio

from the EP MaxiSingle
- Released: 6 October 1995
- Recorded: Miami, Florida
- Studio: Criteria Studios (Miami, Florida)
- Genre: Latin pop
- Length: 3:37
- Label: EMI Latin
- Songwriters: Graciella Carballo; Mario Púparo; Marco Flores
- Producer: Marco Flores

Paulina Rubio singles chronology
"Bésame En La Boca" (1995)	"Pobre Niña Rica" (1995)	"Siempre Tuya Desde La Raíz" (1996)

Audio video
- "Pobre Niña Rica" on YouTube

"Pobre Niña Rica" is a latin pop song released by singer Paulina Rubio as the theme song from her Mexican telenovela of the same name, and later it was released in the first EP of the singer, MaxiSingle and in 1996 as a bonus track of her fourth studio album, Planeta Paulina. There are two versions of the song, the first was launched in conjunction with the launch of the telenovela in Mexico and is written by Graciella Carballo, Mario Púparo and the second was launched in early 1996 as a single airplay and is written and produced by Marco Flores.

In the Univisión television program "Aquí y Ahora" in 1995, Rubio spoke about his character as Alma Villagrán in the soap opera created by Chilean producer Valentín Pimstein, which is closely linked to the meaning of the song. She said: "It is the character of a girl who has everything material, but not everything human, the heart. And she realizes that money does not give you happiness". The song reached number 9 in Mexico City's Ballad charts.

== Track listing and formats ==
- Mexico CD, Single, Promo
1. "Pobre Niña Rica" – 4:33
2. "Pobre Niña Rica" (Radio Edit) – 3:37
- USA CD, Single, Promo
1. "Pobre Niña Rica" – 3:36
