= Nashla Aguilar =

Mexican actress

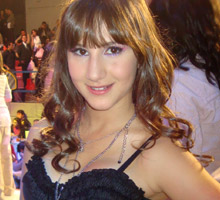
- Born: Nashla Aguilar Abraham; March 22, 1994 (age 31); Mexico City, Mexico
- Occupation(s): Actress and television host

Nashla Aguilar Abraham (born March 22, 1994) is a Mexican actress. She started her career in Código F.A.M.A.. She has appeared in: Noticieros con Carlos Loret de Mola, in different commercials, Al medio día, HOY, Nuestra Casa, Sueños y caramelos and the Mexican soap opera Atrévete a soñar; where she played a character named Paola. She lives in Mexico City.

== Filmography ==
Year	Title	Role	Notes
2003	Código F.A.M.A.	Herself	Contestant (season 1)
2005	Sueños y caramelos	Sofía Ramírez	Main role
2005	La Energía de Sonric'slandia	Herself	Contestant
2006	Duelo de pasiones	Gaby	Recurring role
2008–2012	La rosa de Guadalupe	Malena Lucía Luz Grecia	Episode: "Segunda oportunidad" Episode: "Demasiado Pronto" Episode: "La luz te va a salvar" Episode: "El mundo sólo es uno"
2009–2010	Atrévete a soñar	Paola	Supporting role
2011–2013	Como dice el dicho	Ximena Brenda Fernanda	Episode: "Nadie sabe lo que está en la olla..." Episode: "El que a hierro mata..." Episode: "Cuando la calumnia no mancha tizna"
2019	Silvia Pinal, frente a ti	Luz María	Episode: "El show de Silvia y Felipe"
2020	40 y 20	Mary	Episode: "El Cumpleaños de Rocío"
2021	Parientes a la fuerza	Lulú	Recurring role
2023	Pienso en ti	Young Daniela Avendaño	Guest star
2023	¿Es neta, Eva?	Alejandra	Main role

== Awards ==
Prize	Year	Category	Result
Socialiteen Awards	2020	Youth Host of the Year	Winner
