= Marina Stavenhagen =

Mexican screenwriter and film director (born 1962)

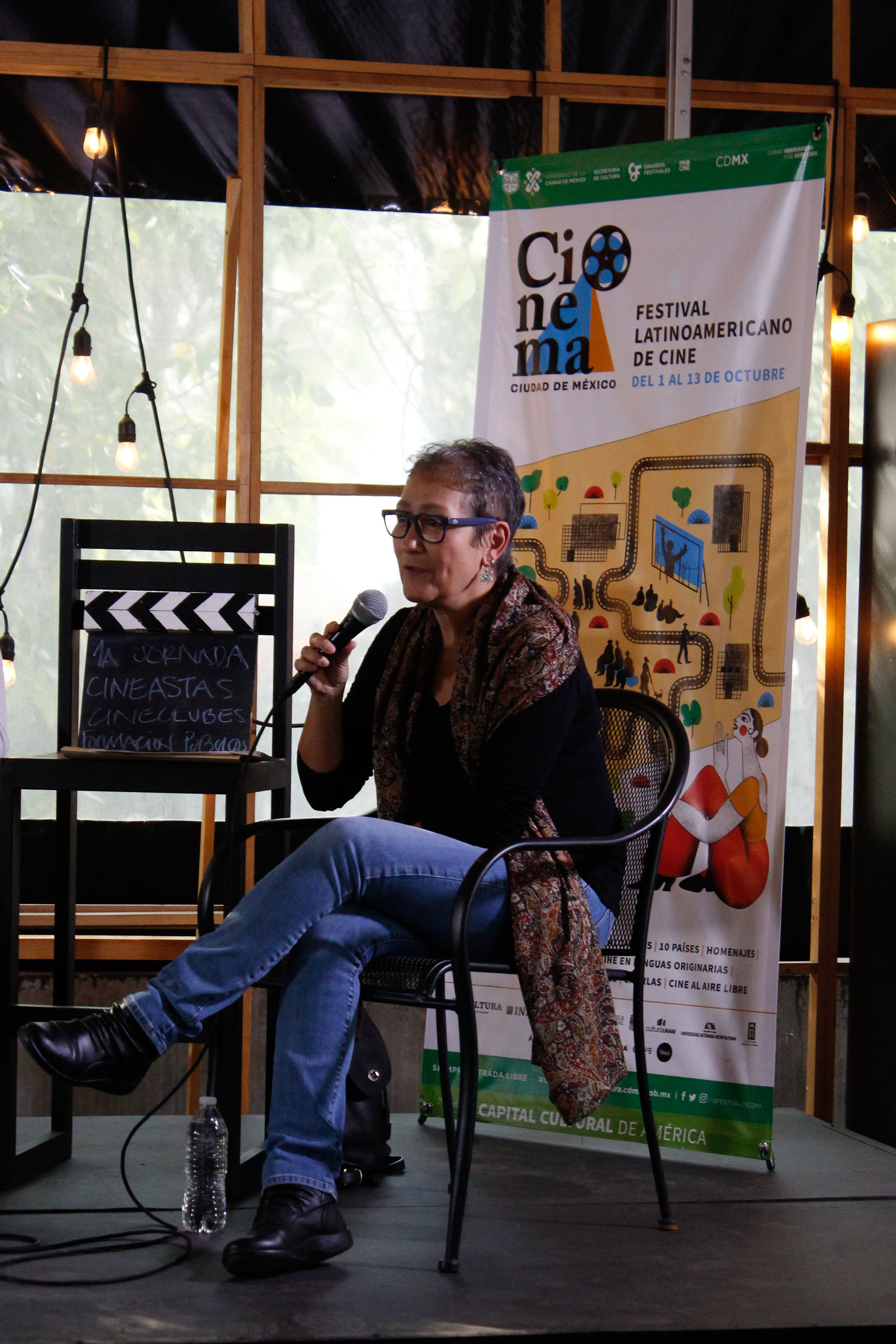
- Born: July 16, 1962 (age 63); Mexico City, Mexico
- Education: National Autonomous University of Mexico Centro de Capacitación Cinematográfica
- Occupation(s): Screenwriter, director

Marina Stavenhagen (born July 16, 1962 in Mexico City) is a Mexican screenwriter, writer, and film director. She is the daughter of anthropologists Rodolfo Stavenhagen and María Eugenia Vargas. Her family arrived in Mexico after escaping Nazi Germany.

== Career ==
Her work has focused on social themes in Mexico, such as student movements and guerrillas. She been dedicated to promoting a "national identity" in Mexican cinema, often emphasizing the difficulties and lack of support for Mexican filmmakers.

She has written scripts for feature films including En medio de la nada (1992) and the award-winning De la calle (2000). In 2005, she wrote the screenplay for a documentary about revolutionary Mexican schoolteacher Lucio Cabañas.

From 2007 to 2012, she was the director of the Instituto Mexicano de Cinematografía (IMCINE, Mexican Institute of Cinematography).

She was a member of the Sistema Nacional de Creadores de Arte (National System of Creators), of the board of directors of the Festival de Cine para Niños (Children's Film Festival) and president of the Association of Women in Film and Television in Mexico.

== Awards and honors ==
In 2004, the French government awarded her the Decoration of Arts and Letters for her work promoting French culture through the Festival of French Cinema in Acapulco.

== Filmography ==
=== Script ===
- La guerrilla y la esperanza: Lucio Cabañas (2005)
- La última noche (2003)
- De la calle (2001) [Streeters]
- En medio de la nada (1994) [In the Middle of Nowhere]
- Dentro de la noche (1991)
- La última luna (1990)

=== Direction ===
- Sonata de luna (1992)
- Amor y venganza (1991) (Love and Vengeance)
