= Peregrina (Venezuelan TV series) =

- Genre: Telenovela
- Created by: Delia Fiallo
- Directed by: Grazzio D'Angelo
- Starring: Rebeca González; José Bardina
- Opening theme: Contigo y aquí by Elio Roca
- Country of origin: Venezuela
- Original language: Spanish
- No. of episodes: 146

Production
- Producer: José Enrique Crousillat
- Production company: Venevisión

Original release
- Network: Venevisión
- Release: 1973 – 1973

Related
- Kassandra (1992); Peregrina (2005)

Peregrina is a Venezuelan telenovela created and written by Delia Fiallo and produced by Venevisión in 1973. Rebeca González and José Bardina starred as the main protagonists.

The series spawned several remakes: Venezuelan La muchacha del circo in 1988, Venezuelan Kassandra in 1992, Mexican Peregrina in 2005, and Russian Принцесса цирка (Princess of the Circus) in 2008.

== Plot ==
In a Venezuelan town, a woman named Miriam suffering from leukemia dies while giving birth. Her husband Dr. Mirabal dies in an accident, and the young girl is left in the care of her maternal grandfather, Mendoza. But his wife and step-mother of the deceased Miriam want the Mendoza family fortune to remain with the twin sons, Juan Carlos and Rolando, born from Mendoza's first marriage. The evil step-mother then gives the child to a gypsy woman who is part of a circus that is passing through town.

Twenty years later, the girl Gisela has become a beautiful woman, and returns to the town of her birth with the circus. Mendoza and his sister Yolanda see her and realise that the gypsy girl has the same looks as his late daughter Miriam, and he realises that she is his long-lost granddaughter. Rolando who has grown ambitious as his mother, learns that Gisela is the heir to the Mendoza fortune, and plans on marrying her in order to possess her fortune. During their wedding night, Gisela discovers that Rolando doesn't love her. Heartbroken, Gisela leaves to return to the circus without knowing that Rolando was assassinated, and she is accused of the crime. Juan Carlos, Rolando's twin brother, believing Gisela murdered his brother, decides to carry out his revenge against her.

== Cast ==
- Rebeca González as Gisela / Miriam Mendoza
- José Bardina as Juan Carlos Pallares / Rolando Pallares
- Haydee Balza as Norma
- Reneé de Pallás as Victoria
- Eva Blanco as Yolanda
- Betty Ruth as Aurora
- José Luis Silva as Randu "El Tirano"
- Luis Abreu as Manrique Alonso
- Ana Castell as Celia
- Esperanza Magaz as Dorinda
- Nerón Rojas
- Carlos Subero as Simon
- Mary Soliani as Evita
- Chumico Romero as Aisha
- Oscar Mendoza as Glinka
- Francisco Ferrari as Adolfo Zamora
- José Oliva as Roberto
- Enrique Alzugaray as Calunga
- Francia Ortiz as Flora
- Néstor Zavarce as Ruben
- Caridad Canelón as Alina
- Elio Roca as Herself
- Julio Mota as Genaro
- Lucila Herrera as Elvira
- Soledad Rojas as Lazara
- Guillermo Ferran as Efrain
