= Pablo Magallanes =

Mexican actor (born 1978)

- Born: Juan Pablo Magallanes Moreno; December 17, 1978 (age 47); Ciudad Obregón, Sonora, Mexico

Juan Pablo Magallanes Moreno (born December 17, 1978) is a Mexican actor known for his appearances in different chapters of "La Rosa De Guadalupe" and "Mujer, Casos de la Vida Real"

== Biography ==
Juan Pablo Magallanes Moreno was born in Ciudad Obregón, Sonora, Mexico. He studied architecture but his passion was acting, he graduated from the exclusive Televisa Acting School Centro de Educación Artística (CEA) and his first job was on the telenovela Mujeres engañadas

In 2001 he participated in the telenovela El Juego de la Vida, and a year later starred as 'Hugo Salcedo' in the teen drama Clase 406.

In 2003 he had a special participation in Velo de Novia, and in 2004 participated in Mujer de Madera.

He participated in the telenovela En Nombre Del Amor playing the role of 'Aaron Eugene Cortázar' in 2008, and a year later made some appearances in the hit telenovela Hasta Que El Dinero Nos Separe alongside Pedro Fernández and Itatí Cantoral.

In 2011 Emilio Larrosa invited him to join the cast of "Dos Hogares" in the role of Óscar Lagos.

== Filmography ==
- 2001: El Juego de la Vida
- 2002: Clase 406 as Hugo Salcedo
- 2003: Velo de Novia as Raúl Paz
- 2003–2005: Mujer, Casos de la Vida Real
- 2004: Mujer de Madera as Valentin Calderón
- 2008: La Rosa De Guadalupe as Iván (Episode: "Aliviánate")
- 2008–2009: En Nombre del Amor as Aarón Eugenio Cortázar
- 2009: Hasta Que el Dinero Nos Separe as Sergio
- 2011: El Equipo as Javier Macedo
- 2011-2012: Dos Hogares as Óscar Lagos Urbina
- 2012 Como dice el dicho as Brandon
