= Lucía Álvarez =

Mexican composer and pianist (born 1948)

- Born: Lucía Álvarez Vázquez; November 28, 1948 (age 77); Mexico City, Mexico
- Genres: Film scores, Orchestra
- Occupations: Composer, Pianist
- Instruments: Piano, Cello
- Years active: 1974–present

Lucía Álvarez Vázquez (born November 28, 1948) is a Mexican composer and pianist widely known throughout Latin America. Born in Mexico City, Álvarez received her degree in piano and composition from the School of Music at the National Autonomous University of Mexico. She studied under Carlos Vázquez, Pablo Castellanos, Jorge Suárez, Américo Caramuta and Pierre van Hawe. Her music reflects aspects of Neo-romantic traditions rather than avant-garde styles that popularized throughout the late 20th century. Since the 1970s, Álvarez has composed music for films, television, and more than 100 concert works, including duets and quartets for strings, chamber music, and symphonic orchestras. Her work includes Midaq Alley (1995), for which she won the Ariel Award for Best Original Score in 1995, The Beginning and the End (1993), and Bedtime Fairy Tales for Crocodiles (2002). She is considered one of the best composers in the history of Mexican cinema.

== Sources ==
- Ficher, Miguel; Schleifer, Martha Furman; Furman, John M. (2002). Latin American Classical Composers: A Biographical Dictionary. Scarecrow Press. ISBN 978-1-4616-6911-1. OCLC 1065854026.
- Meierovich, Clara (2003). "Mujeres en la creación musical de México". Latin American Music Review / Revista de Música Latinoamericana. 24 (1): 148–153. doi:10.1353/lat.2003.0002. JSTOR 3598718. S2CID 190614615.
- García Bonilla, Roberto (2001). Visiones Sonoras: Entrevistas con compositores, solistas y directores. Siglo XXI Ediciones. ISBN 978-9-6823-2388-1.
