= Leticia Huijara =

Mexican actress

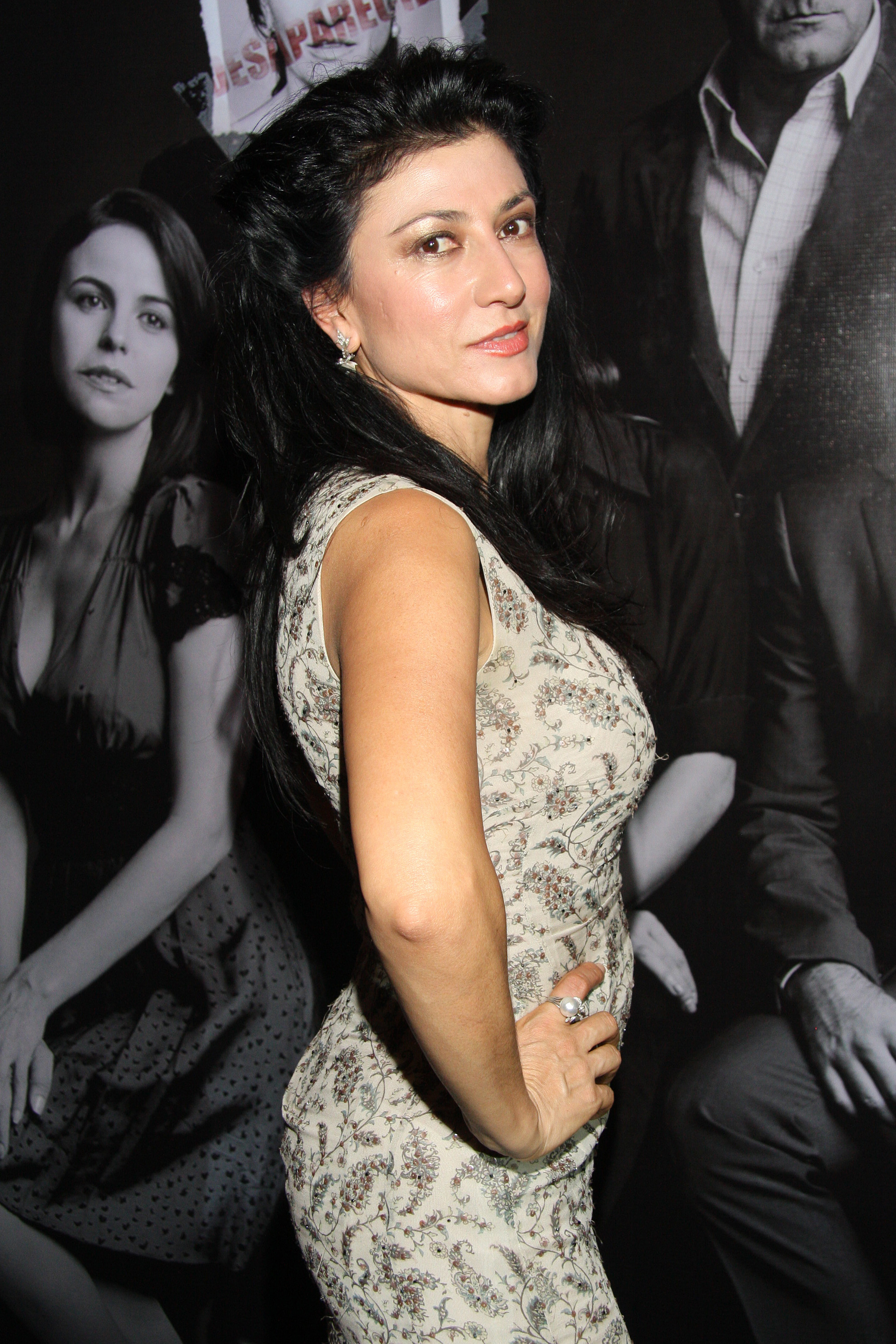
- A Mexican actress
- Born: Leticia Huijara; Acapulco, Guerrero, Mexico
- Occupation: Actress
- Years active: 1989-present

Leticia Huijara is a Mexican actress who was born in Acapulco, Guerrero, Mexico.

== Biography ==
Huijara began her acting career in 1987 in the work of street theater. Since then she has combined her work in the theater with film and television. She has won several awards among which the Ariel for Best Actress for the film "Por si no te vuelvo a ver" and the award for best leading actress of television that is given by the National Circle of Journalists for the telenovela "Los Sanchez". She has combined her theatrical career with the film, which has been featured in several films among which are: La ley de Herodes, Ciudades oscuras, Sexo por compasión, Por si no te vuelvo a ver, Dos crímenes, Cilantro and Perejil and Lola, among many others. She has been nominated for an Ariel on three occasions, twice as actress and as a lead actress. She was also nominated for the Silver Goddess. In theater, she participated in "Baño de damas"(best female group award association of theater critics and journalists), Venecia, Sueños, Los signos del Zodiaco, Paisaje Interior, En Defensa Propia y la Última Diana, among many others. She was part of the cast of the telenovela Los Sanchez (Best Lead Actress Award 2005 National Circle of Journalists), where she portrayed the character of a woman of high class living circumstances beyond series with a family that does not belong to their social circle. She also worked in telenovelas Montecristo and Demasiado corazón, in addition to various other programs. She directed "Ocho historias de cantina" in the Santa Catarina theater. She has been producing works like "baño de damas" and "los delitos insignificantes", both in the Helénico theatre. In 2009, she debuted "Juntos y Felices", her first work as a playwright.

== Filmography ==
Television performance
Year	Title	Roles	Notes
1990	Hora marcada	Beatriz	Episode: "En el cuarto de arriba"
2001	Lo que callamos las mujeres	Tere	Episode: "Cuenta hasta diez"
2004–2005	Los Sánchez	Charo "Charito" Banegas de Uriarte	
2006	Montecristo	Dolores "Lola" Carreño	
2010	El octavo mandamiento	Isabel San Millán	
2014	Siempre tuya Acapulco	Esperanza Santander	
2016	Un día cualquiera	Daniela	Episode: "Herencia"
2016–2017	Despertar contigo	Daniela	Series regular; 117 episodes
2017	Sense8	Daniela's mother	Episode: "I Have No Room in My Heart for Hate"
2017	El César	Doña Isabel	Series regular; 14 episodes
2018	La bella y las bestias	Gloria Quintero	Series regular; 58 episodes
2019	Playing with Fire	Dolores González	Series regular; 9 episodes
2019	Tijuana		Series regular; 6 episodes
2020	Como tú no hay 2	Sol Morales	Series regular; 75 episodes
2020	Oscuro deseo	Lucinda	18 episodes

== Awards and nominations ==
=== TVyNovelas Awards ===
Year	Category	Recipient	Result
2017	Best Co-lead Actress	Despertar contigo	Nominated

=== Ariel Awards ===
Year	Category	Movie	Result
2002	Ariel a Mejor Coactuación Femenina	Ciudades oscuras	Nominated
1998	Ariel Award for Best Actress	Por si no te vuelvo a ver	Winner
1994	Ariel a Mejor Coactuación Femenina	Dos crímenes	Nominated
