= Peregrina (Mexican TV series) =

- Genre: Telenovela
- Based on: Peregrina by Delia Fiallo
- Written by: Carlos Romero; Tere Medina; Julio Garibay
- Directed by: Miguel Córcega; Victor Rodriguez; Eric Morales
- Country of origin: Mexico
- Original language: Spanish
- No. of episodes: 100

Production
- Executive producer: Nathalie Lartilleux
- Production locations: Televisa San Ángel; Mexico City, Mexico; Playa del Carmen, Quintana Roo
- Camera setup: Multi-camera
- Running time: 41-44 minutes
- Production company: Televisa

Original release
- Network: Canal de las Estrellas
- Release: 14 November 2005 – 31 March 2006

Related
- Kassandra (1992)

Peregrina (English: Pilgrim) is a Mexican telenovela produced by Nathalie Lartilleux for Televisa. The series is a remake of the 1973 Venezuelan telenovela Peregrina. It premiered on 14 November 2005 and ended on 31 March 2006. It became an unexpected success, garnering ratings in excess of 30 points.

África Zavala starred as protagonist and Eduardo Capetillo starred has a dual role of protagonist/antagonist, while Jacqueline Andere, Cynthia Klitbo and Natasha Dupeyrón starred as antagonists.

== Plot ==
Millionaire Eliseo (Carlos Cámara) and his family are struck by tragedy when his beloved daughter Marisela (África Zavala) is diagnosed with a fatal illness. Marisela becomes pregnant and dies after giving birth to a baby girl.

Widowed, devastated, and lonely, Eliseo marries Victoria (Jacqueline Andere). Victoria is a widow who has two children, identical twins Aníbal and Rodolfo (both played by Eduardo Capetillo). Victoria knows that Marisela's daughter is Eliseo’s heir, and she views her as an obstacle to her sons chances to inherit Eliseo’s fortune.

She takes advantage of the presence of a travelling circus where the fortuneteller’s daughter, Sabina (Helena Rojo), has given birth to a stillborn daughter. Victoria switches the infants; she replaces the stillborn baby with Marisela's daughter, with Delfín as the only witness. Delfín later dies in a mysterious accident.

Years pass and Rodolfo is now a just and kind man, the opposite of his egotistic twin Aníbal. Fate takes him to the circus where he meets Peregrina, a beautiful gypsy dancer. She is the fortuneteller’s granddaughter.

Peregrina is the spitting image of Marisela. Rodolfo and Peregrina fall in love, but her resemblance to his stepfather’s daughter reminds him of the hatred that Victoria feels for Marisela. He decides to forget all about it and leaves without saying a word.

When Peregrina goes looking for Rodolfo at Eliseo’s house, she meets Angélica (Carmen Amezcua), her real mother’s aunt. Angélica takes to Peregrina due to her resemblance to Marisela. Shortly after, Peregrina is victim of an accident and is taken to Eliseo’s house.

Eliseo offers her a home, but Victoria, who knows exactly who Peregrina is, is enraged and so, she reveals her secret to Aníbal.

Taking advantage of the prolonged absence of Rodolfo, Aníbal assumes his identity and proposes marriage to Peregrina. Aníbal confesses to his lover Abigaíl (Cynthia Klitbo) that he is only marrying Peregrina in order to seize the fortune of Eliseo.

Abigaíl gets into a heated fight with him, in which she kills him to prevent his marriage to Peregrina. Peregrina is accused of Aníbal’s homicide.

When Rodolfo returns, she now has to face the only man whom she has ever loved. Rodolfo’s love for her has turned into ferocious revenge.

In the end, Rodolfo tells Peregrina that Aníbal tricked her and that he now knows she is innocent. Peregrina forgives him and moves into the house that Eliseo left her as part of her inheritance. Abigaíl and Evita (Natasha Dupeyrón), her secret daughter, plot against her to get rid of her.

Eventually, Abigaíl is found out to be Aníbal killer and is sent to prison to pay for her crime. Months later, Peregrina and Rodolfo marry in the presence of loving relatives and circus friends.

== Cast ==
- África Zavala as Peregrina Huerta/Marisela Alcocer
- Eduardo Capetillo as Rodolfo Alcocer Castillo/Aníbal Alcocer Castillo
- Jacqueline Andere as Victoria Castillo de Alcocer
- Helena Rojo as Sabina Huerta
- Cynthia Klitbo as Abigail Osorio
- Natasha Dupeyrón as Eva "Evita" Contreras Osorio
- Víctor Noriega as Eugenio
- Ignacio López Tarso as Baltasar
- Carlos Cámara as Don Eliseo Alcocer
- Carmen Amezcua as Angélica Morales
- Tony Bravo as Alonso
- Carlos Cámara Jr. as Joaquín
- José Carlos Ruiz as Castillo
- Guillermo García Cantú as Carreón
- Beatriz Aguirre as Jueza Navarro
- Salvador Sánchez as Melquíades
- Miguel Córcega as Felipe
- Alejandro Ibarra as Rubén "Tontín"
- Diana Golden as Vicenta
- Abraham Ramos as Iván
- Malillany Marín as Argelia
- Miguel Loyo as Karim
- Eduardo Rodríguez as Benjamín
- Violeta Isfel as Charito
- Catherine Papile as Sandra
- Renata Flores as Divina
- Miguel Ángel Fuentes as Cuasimodo
- Elías Chiprut as Eduardo
- María Chacón as Edith
- Alberto Chávez as Gregorio
- Sara Montes as Fermina
- Rosita Quintana as Eloína
- Michelle Álvarez as Brenda
- Guillermo Capetillo
- Raúl Padilla "Chóforo"

== Awards and nominations ==
Year	Award	Category	Nominee	Result
2006	24th TVyNovelas Awards	Best Antagonist Actress	Cynthia Klitbo	Nominated
2006	24th TVyNovelas Awards	Best Leading Actress	Helena Rojo	Nominated
