= Pobre niña rica =

Mexican telenovela

- Genre: Telenovela
- Written by: Dinorah Isaak; Luis Moreno; Tere Medina
- Story by: Carmen Daniels
- Directed by: Antulio Jiménez Pons
- Starring: Victoria Ruffo; Ariel López Padilla; Paulina Rubio
- Theme music composer: Marco Flores
- Opening theme: "Pobre Niña Rica" performed by Paulina Rubio
- Country of origin: Mexico
- Original language: Spanish
- No. of episodes: 65

Production
- Executive producer: Enrique Segoviano
- Producer: Gabriel Vázquez Bulman
- Camera setup: Multi-camera

Original release
- Network: Canal de las Estrellas
- Release: October 2, 1995 – January 5, 1996

Pobre niña rica (English title: Poor Little Rich Girl) is a Mexican telenovela produced by Enrique Segoviano for Televisa.

The series stars Victoria Ruffo as Consuelo, Ariel López Padilla as Julio and Paulina Rubio as Alma.

== Plot ==
Like the story of Cinderella, Consuelo has been reduced to being practically a servant by her mother and her two brothers. The only one who loves her is her father, but he soon dies. And when her family finds out that he left everything to her, they send her abroad so that she will not find out and they can keep the money. But the fairy godmother and the prince both appear in the guise of Julio, a neurologist who sees beyond Consuelo's unattractive appearance to the beautiful woman who lies underneath. He will give her his love but, more importantly, he will teach her to love herself.

== Cast ==
=== Main ===
- Victoria Ruffo as Consuelo
- Ariel López Padilla as Julio
- Paulina Rubio as Alma

=== Supporting & Recurring ===
- Laura Zapata as Teresa
- Gerardo Murguía as Carlos Villagrán
- Miguel Córcega as Don Juan Carlos Villagrán
- Antonio as César Manzanillo
- Amparo Arozamena as Doña Andrea Múzquiz
- Marco Antonio Calvillo as Hijo de Cata
- Elsa Cárdenas as Alicia de García-Mora
- Gerardo del Castillo as Teniente J.
- Pilar Escalante as Claudia Domínguez
- Ernesto Godoy as Mauricio Villagrán García-Mora
- Gabriela Platas as Estela Medrano
- Luis Uribe as Héctor Iturriaga
- Rafael Amador as Chavo
- Alejandro Aragón as Alfredo
- Sergio Catalán as Eduardo
- Aurora Clavel as Cata
- Mauricio Islas as David
- Mercedes Molto as Bárbara
- Azela Robinson as Ana Luisa
- Indra Zuno as Ángela
