= Nada de Ti =

"Nada De Ti"

Single by Paulina Rubio

from the album El Tiempo Es Oro
- Released: 12 March 1995
- Recorded: Balu-Balu Estudios (Madrid, Spain)
- Genre: Latin pop; pop rock; tropical
- Length: 3:27
- Label: EMI Latin; Virgin
- Songwriter: Marco Flores
- Producer: Miguel Blasco

Paulina Rubio singles chronology
| "Te Daría Mi Vida" (1995) | "Nada De Ti" (1995) | "Hoy Te Dejé De Amar" (1995) |

Music video
- "Nada De Ti" on YouTube

"Nada De Ti" (Nothing from You) is a song recorded by Mexican singer Paulina Rubio, taken from her third studio album El Tiempo Es Oro (1995). It was released as the album's second single on March 12, 1995, and distributed by EMI Latin as a CD single. The track was written by Marco Flores and produced by Miguel Blasco, and was recorded in Madrid, Spain. Musically, it is a Latin pop song with elements of pop rock and tropical music that lyrically talk about overcome a bad relationship.

Rubio presented the song in numerous television shows throughout Latin America and during the promotion of El Tiempo Es Oro in Spain, where she performed in February 1996 during the Carnival of Santa Cruz de Tenerife. The song reached the top ten in the airplay charts in Mexico City and San Salvador.

== Music video ==
The accompanying music video was filmed in Miami, Florida, when Rubio was finishing her photo shoot and directed by Raúl Estupiñan. In the video Rubio is a top model that conquers the cameraman with different costumes and poses. Parallel to that, she remembers her ex-boyfriend and the way he cheated on her with another woman.

The video premiered on June 17, 1995, the 24th birthday on the En Vivo television show, hosted by Mexican journalist Ricardo Rocha.

== Track listing and formats ==
- Mexico CD, Single, Promo
1. "Nada De Ti" – 3:31
