= Bésame En La Boca (film) =

1995 film by Abraham Cherem

- Directed by: Abraham Cherem
- Written by: Abraham Cherem; Ricardo Del Río
- Produced by: Humberto Zurita; Christian Bach; Georgina Terán
- Starring: Paulina Rubio; Charlie Masso; Fernando Colunga; Leonardo García; Delia Casanova; Dolores Beristáin
- Edited by: Óscar Figueroa
- Music by: Omar Guzmán
- Production company: Televisa San Ángel
- Distributed by: Televicine
- Release date: June 23, 1995
- Running time: 100 minutes
- Country: Mexico
- Language: Spanish

Bésame En La Boca is a 1995 Mexican romance and fantasy film directed and written by Abraham Cherem and Ricardo Del Rio, and produced by Humberto Zurita and Christian Bach. The film stars Latin pop singer Paulina Rubio, actors Charlie Masso, Fernando Colunga, Delia Casanova, Dolores Beristáin, and Leonardo García. The film was produced by Televicine and released on June 23, 1995 in Mexico. The plot centers on one young girl as she take an ancestral travel and changes body, finding herself and real love in the process.

Development on the film began in 1994, when Rubio created a concept inspired by Warren Beatty and Buck Henry's film Heaven Can Wait (1978) and Alexander Hall's Here Comes Mr. Jordan (1941), which was later expanded by Humberto Zurita and Christian Bach. Principal filming began in November 1994, and encompassed over a period of two months.

Critics gave mixed reviews to Bésame En La Boca; however, they considered it a better effort of Rubio as actress. Despite the film's response from critics, it was a box office success, Staying on the main billboard for six weeks. According to the website staff of the newspaper El Debate, at that time the film "brought thousands of young people to theaters to enjoy 'La Chica Dorada' [Rubio], who at that time had already scored her first hit, "Mío", and [Fernando] Colunga, who was beginning to emerge as a telenovelas actor."

== Synopsis ==
Claudia (Paulina Rubio) is a rich and selfish girl who, after discovering that her boyfriend Arturo (Fernando Colunga) cheated on her with the promise of making her a famous singer, suffers an accident in which she dies. However, when she arrives in heaven two little angels realize that she should not have died and send her back to Earth, but with the body and life of someone else ...

== Cast ==
- Paulina Rubio as Claudia Romero / Mónica González
- Charlie Masso as Eduardo
- Fernando Colunga as Arturo
- Delia Casanova as Consuelo
- Dolores Beristáin as La abuela
- Kenia Gazon as Elvira
- René Pereyra as Alejandro
- Moisés Iván Mora as Jean
- Leonardo García as Pedro (El Chofer)
- Richard Voll as Dylan
- Claudia Ortega as Mónica González
- Daniel Havid as Benjamín
- Alejandra Padro as Andrea
- Chucho Reyes as Jesús (Barman)
- Humberto Zurita as Gerente de la disuera

== Bibliography ==
- Raúl Miranda Flores, Del quinto poder al séptimo arte: la producción fílmica de Televisa CONACULTA/Cineteca Nacional, 2006. ISBN 978-970-9961-04-1.
