= Centro de Capacitación Cinematográfica =

Film school in Mexico City

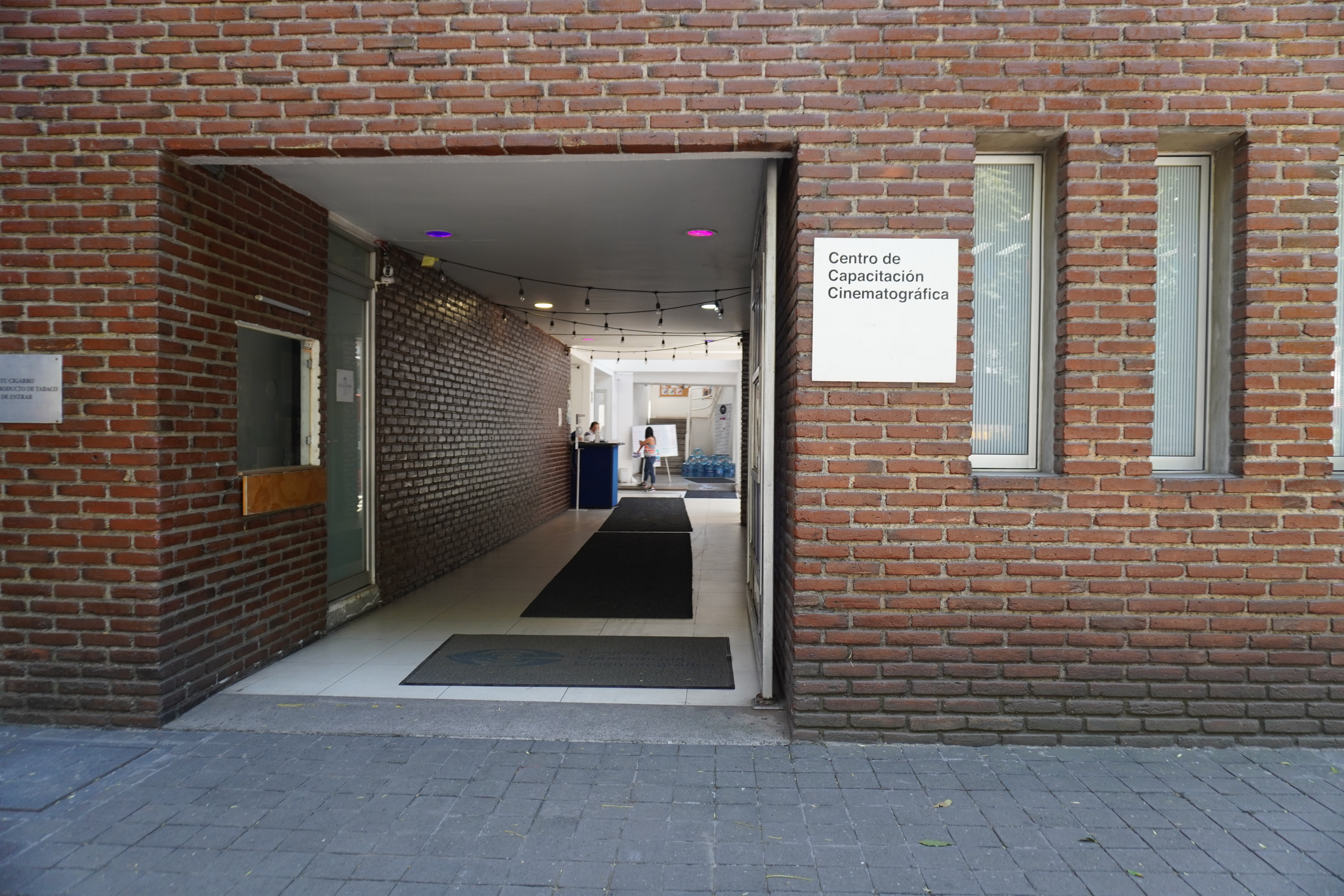
- Type: Film School
- Established: July 15, 1975
- Founder: Luis Buñuel
- Director: Alfredo Loaeza Sánchez
- Location: Calz. de Tlalpan 1670, Country Club Churubusco, Coyoacán, 04220, Mexico City, Mexico
- Language: Spanish
- Website: https://www.elccc.com.mx/sitio/

The Centro de Capacitación Cinematográfica (CCC) is a film school belonging to Mexico's Secretariat of Culture. It was founded in 1975 with the aim of providing technical and artistic training for those entering the film industry. The CCC is part of the International Association of Film and Television Schools and since 2011 to the International Federation of Film Archives. Recognized as a cutting-edge school in film teaching, it received the Award for Academic Excellence at the Tel Aviv Film School Festival, in Israel, in 2005, and in 2006 the Golden Ariel for its 30 years of educational work and contribution to national cinema. It is one of Mexico's two major film schools, the other being the Centro Universitario de Estudios Cinematográficos at the National Autonomous University of Mexico.

The CCC produces about forty short films annually, as well as medium and full-length ones. The films include elements of academic work and are made to professional production standards.

== Courses ==
The school has four programs of study:

- General Cinema Studies
- Cinematographic Screenwriting Course
- Film and Audiovisual Production
- Academic Extension

=== General Cinema Studies ===
The General Cinema Studies course lasts four and a half years, divided in 9 semesters. The academic plan of the Bachelor's Degree consists of a common core of three semesters, which includes subjects for the teaching of cinematographic language, scenic and narrative expression, sound design, editing, and scriptwriting, post-production and documentary filmmaking. After the common core, from the fourth semester, the student can choose to take the following specialties: Directing and Cinematography.

=== Cinematographic Screenwriting Course ===
The Film Script course lasts two years, divided into four semesters. The objective is to create specialized writers in writing for cinema. The course focuses on screenplay development using basic industry-standard tools and employing narrative and script structure analysis. In the first year, students acquire the bases of the cinematographic language, as well as the basic tools: format, rundown, synopsis, plot, and short film script writing. In the second year, the writing of a feature film script is developed.

=== Film and Audiovisual Production ===
The Film and Audiovisual Production course lasts two years, divided into four semesters. It is a more specialized course of the General Cinema Studies. The course focusses on the development of film production and audiovisual production. In the first and second semesters, The first and second semesters focus on the history of film production, economy, direction assistance, distribution, production management, and the film industry. The third and fourth semesters focus on accounting, business planning, TV production, documentary production, and the legal aspects of the film industry.

=== Academic Extension ===
The Department of Academic Extension offers courses, seminars and workshops aimed at all those people who are interested in filmmaking. These courses are held at the CCC in Mexico City. Academic Extension also takes these courses to the interior of the Mexican Republic through the Moving Images Program in collaboration with other institutions.

The courses taught range from introductory to specialized topics: script, directing, cinematography, sound design, film editing, and appreciation seminars. All are taught by successful filmmakers graduated from CCC or active professors from the same institution

== Facilities ==
The CCC is fully equipped with specialised camera, sound, and lighting equipment, as well as props. It can cater for three groups filming in 16mm, one group in S16mm, one in 35mm, and four in video, simultaneously. The CCC also offers full sound and image post-production facilities, in various professional film and video formats, and has full laboratory, transfer, mixing, and re-recording facilities for students to complete their films. It also has three classrooms equipped with audiovisual equipment for theory classes, three 16 and 35 mm cinemas, two video screening rooms, a stage for film and television production, a fully equipped still photo lab, a production office for student projects, a library, a video library, a film library, an audio library, and a cafeteria. Additionally, the school is equipped with a computer network featuring specialised CGI and production software.

== Teachers ==
The CCC includes industry professionals and prominent filmmakers amongst its staff, including Francisco Athié, Siegfried Barjau, Carlos Bolado, Christiane Burkhard, Simon Bross, Carlos Carrera, Felipe Cazals, Nicholas Echeverria, Luis Estrada, Jorge Fons, José Luis García Agraz, Guillermo Granillo, Henner Hofmann, Toni Khun, Beatriz Novaro, Maria Novaro, Ignacio Ortiz, Marina Stavenhagen, Alfredo Joskowicz .

== Opera Prima ==
The CCC, supported by the Mexican Institute of Cinematography, has in recent years been particularly instrumental in developing a project known as Opera Prima, giving young film-makers, producers, writers, and cinematographers – selected via internal competition – the opportunity to produce their first features and make their débuts. The close involvement of the school's students in the various aspects of the production process, and the opportunity for them to shoot their first film, with institutional support provided by the school, are just some of the features of this project, which bridges the gap between the professional film industry and strictly academic film production. Some of the films that have emerged from the CCC's Opera Prima Project have achieved international recognition, including El secreto de Romelia by Busi Cortés, La mujer de Benjamín by Carlos Carrera, Lolo by Francisco Athié, and La orilla de la tierra by Ignacio Ortiz.

== Notable alumni ==
Notable alumni of Centro de Capacitación Cinematográfica include the following.

- Gabriel Beristain, cinematographer, producer, and director
- Carlos Carrera, film director and screenwriter
- Elisa Miller, film director
- Rodrigo Plá, screenwriter and director
- Rodrigo Prieto, cinematographer
