= 60th Ariel Awards =

2018 Mexican film awards

- Official poster for the 60th Ariel Awards created by Dr. Alderete.
- Date: June 5, 2018
- Site: Palacio de Bellas Artes; Mexico City, Mexico
- Hosted by: Mónica Huarte and Mauricio Isaac
- Directed by: Alex Balassa

Highlights
- Best Picture: Sueño en Otro Idioma
- Most awards: Sueño en Otro Idioma (6)
- Most nominations: Sueño en Otro Idioma (16)

Television coverage
- Network: Canal 22

The 60th Ariel Awards ceremony, organized by the Mexican Academy of Film Arts and Sciences (AMACC) took place on June 5, 2018, at the Palacio de Bellas Artes in Mexico City. During the ceremony, AMACC presented the Ariel Award in 26 categories honoring films released in 2017. The ceremony was televised in Mexico by Canal 22.

Sueño en Otro Idioma received six awards out of its 16 nominations, including Best Picture. La Región Salvaje followed with five awards, including Best Director for Amat Escalante. Actress Queta Lavat and cinematographer Toni Kuhn received the Golden Ariel for their outstanding artistic careers.

== Background ==
During a press conference held on April 23, 2018, actresses Ilse Salas and Tiaré Scanda announced the nominees for the 60th Ariel Awards. Sueño en Otro Idioma received the most nominations with 16, including Best Picture; by virtue of his position as President of the AMACC, its film director, Ernesto Contreras did not submit his name for consideration for Best Director. For the first time three female directors were listed for the Best Director accolade, Natalia Beristáin, Lucía Gajá, and Issa López. Gajá was also nominated for Best Picture, Best Documentary Feature, Best Film Editing (Batallas Íntimas) and Best Animated Short (Nos Faltan). Lopez also received a nomination for Best Original Screenplay for Vuelven. Karina Gidi and Daniel Giménez Cacho received nominations for Best Actress and Best Actor for playing adult versions of Rosario Castellanos and Ricardo Guerra Tejada, respectively, while Tessa Ia and Pedro de Tavira, were nominated for Best Supporting Actress and Best Supporting Actor, for the younger versions of the same roles, with Gidi winning the award.

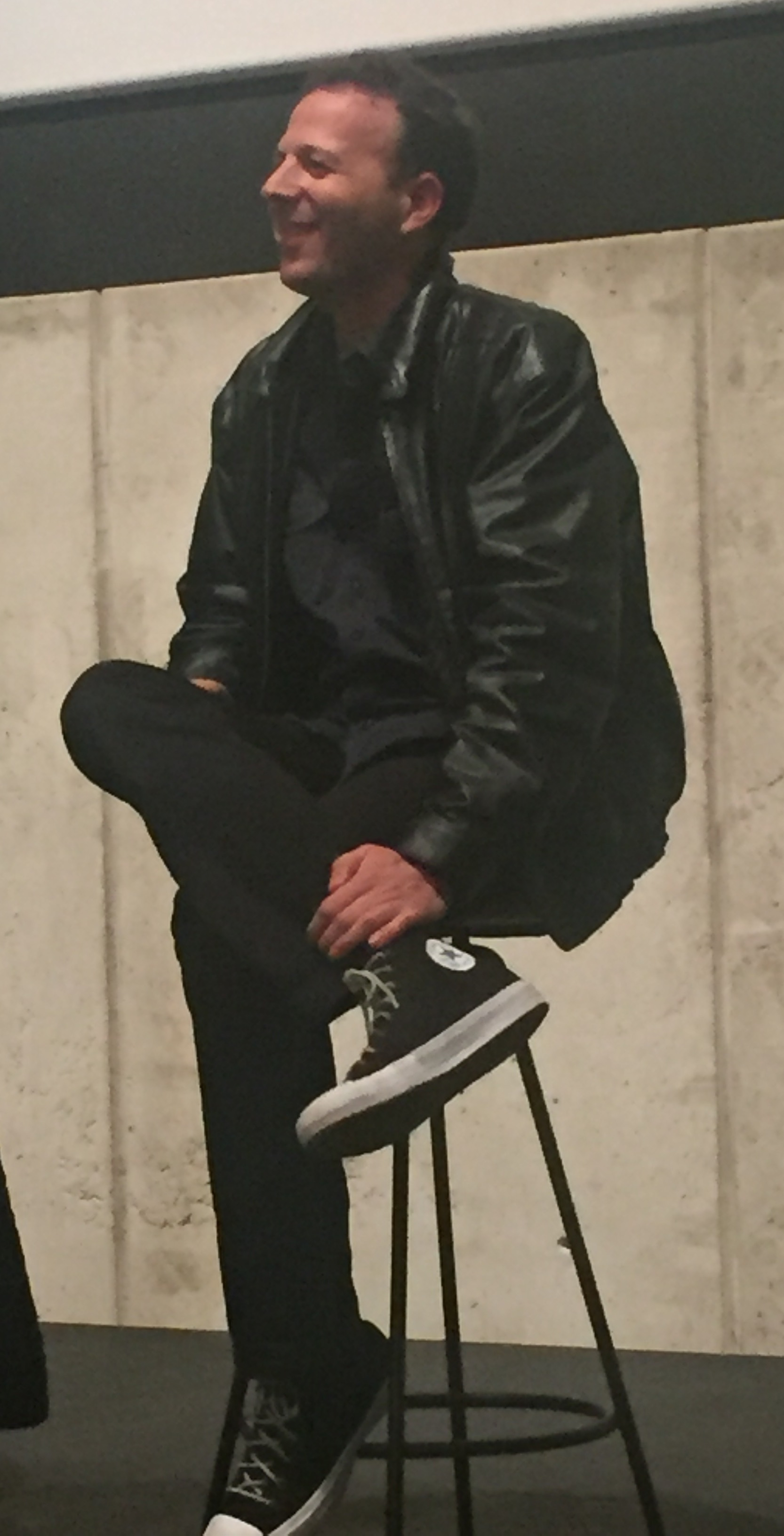
Amat Escalante, Best Director winner

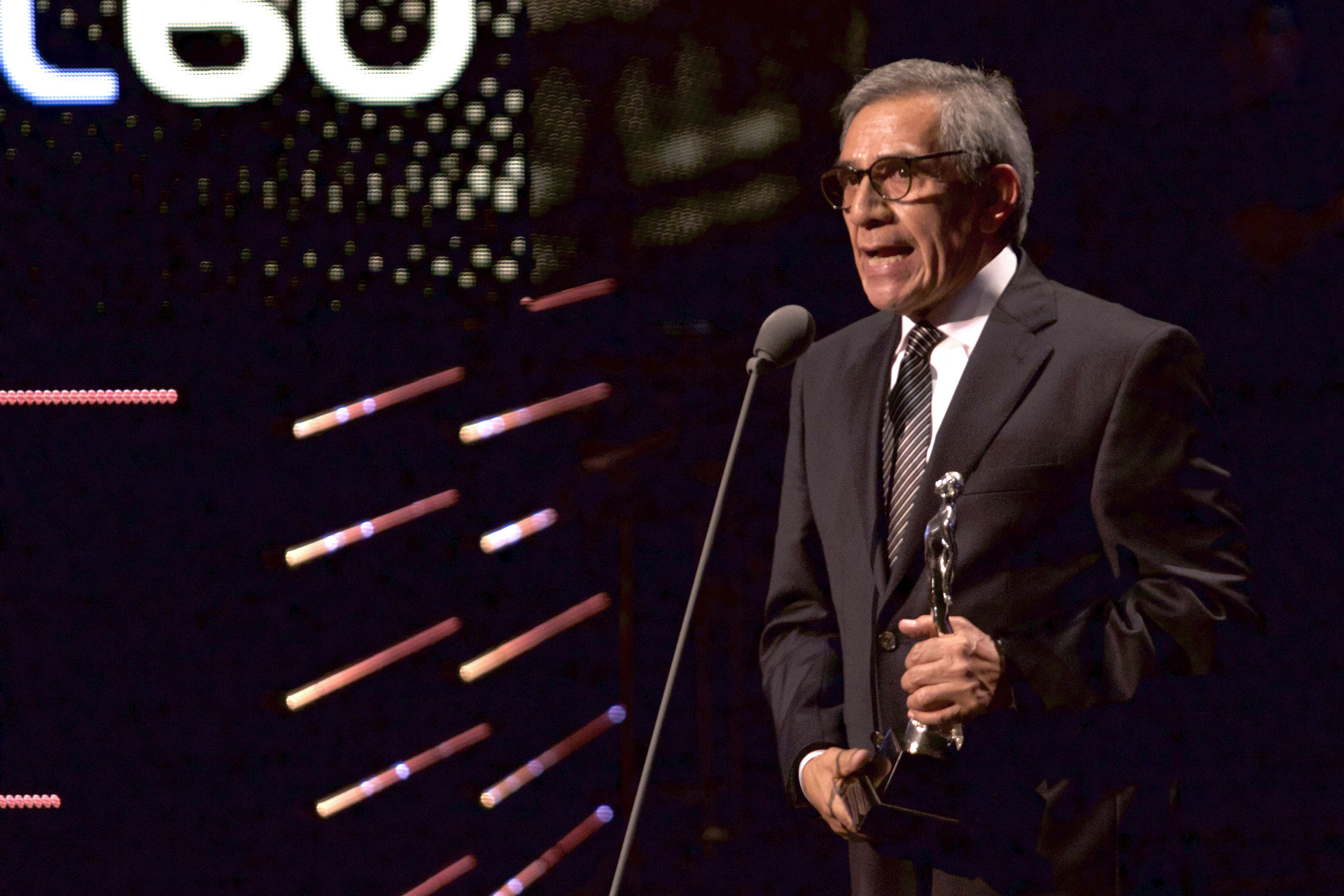
Eligio Meléndez, Best Actor winner

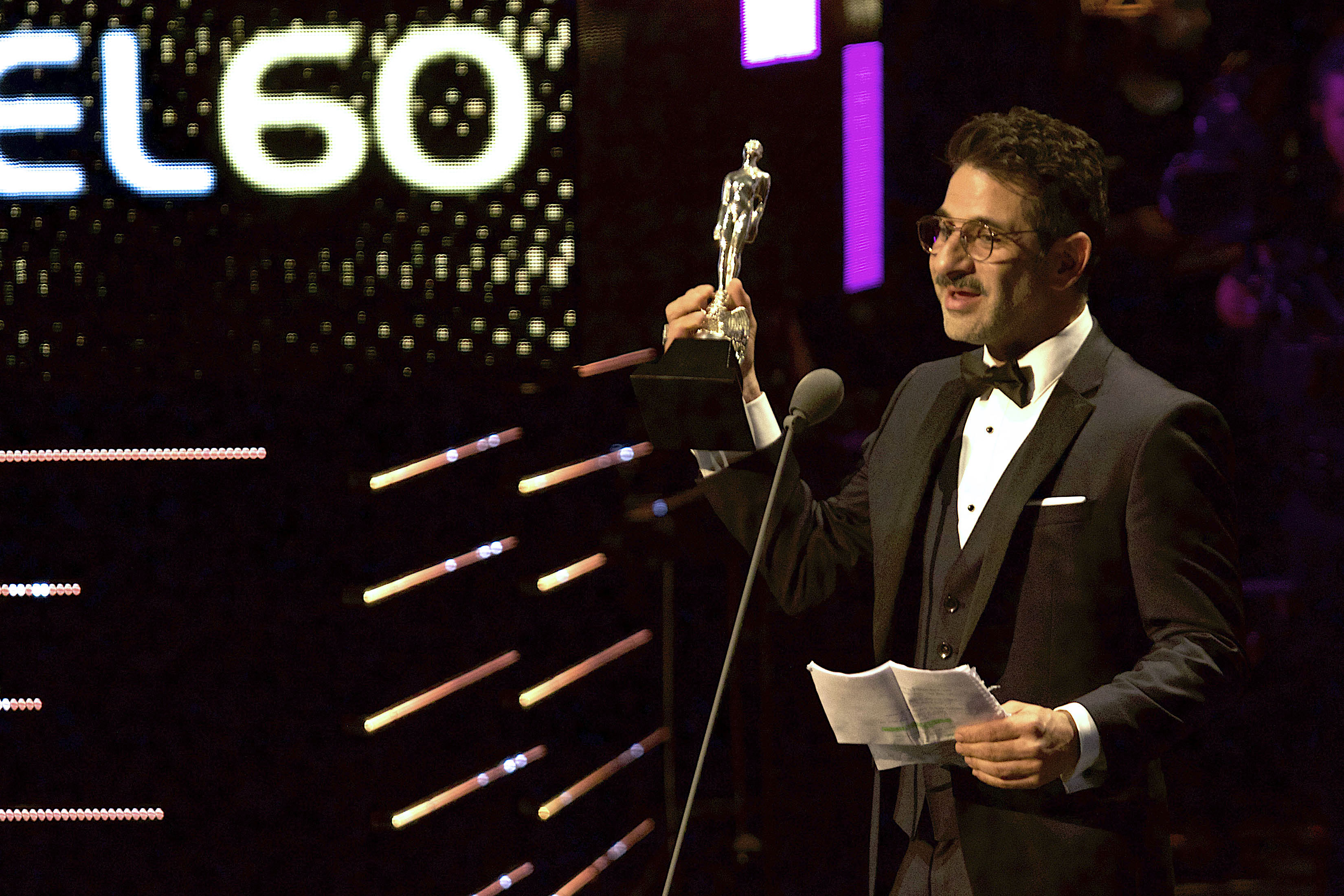
Miguel Rodarte, Best Supporting Actor winner

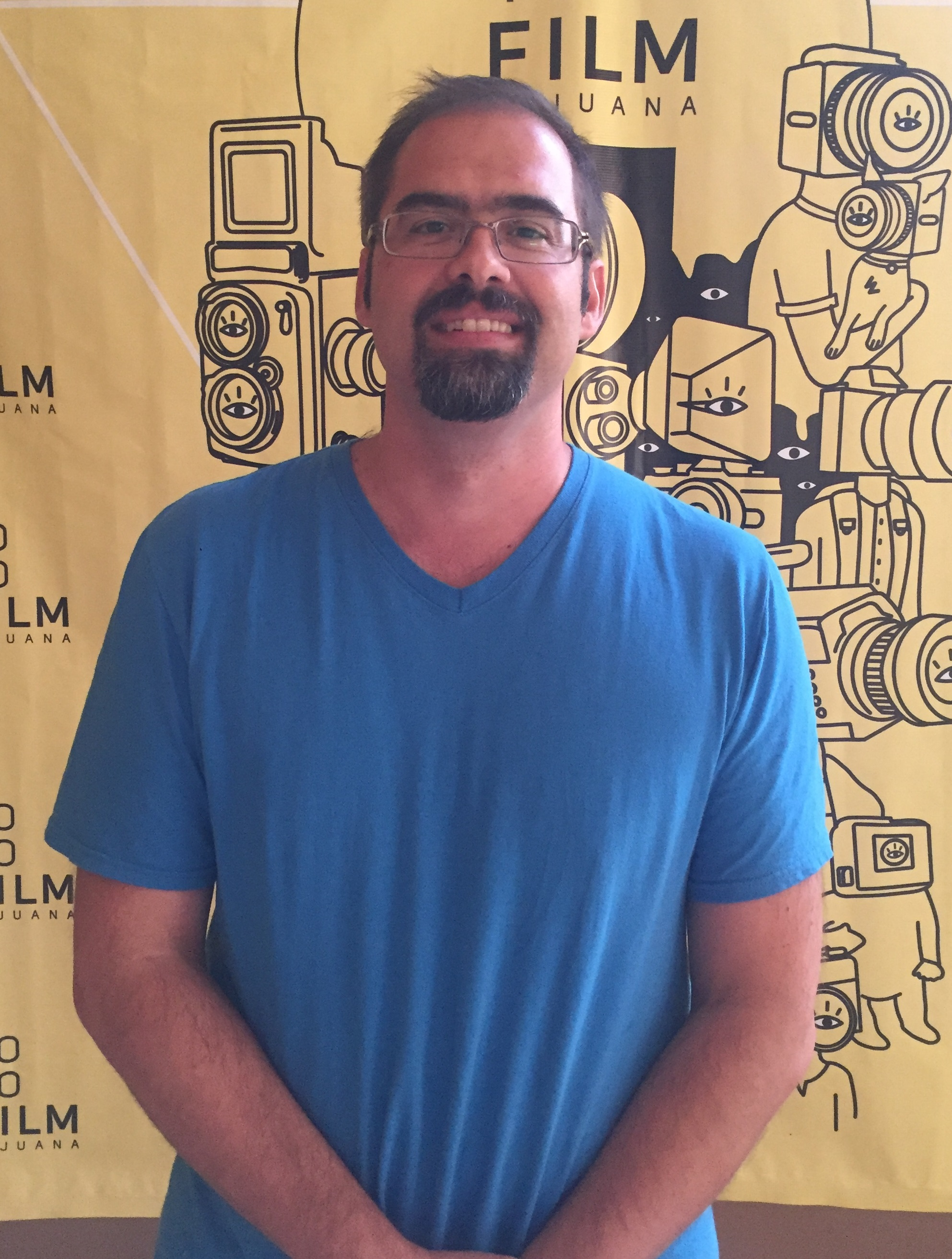
Diego Ros, Best First Feature Film winner

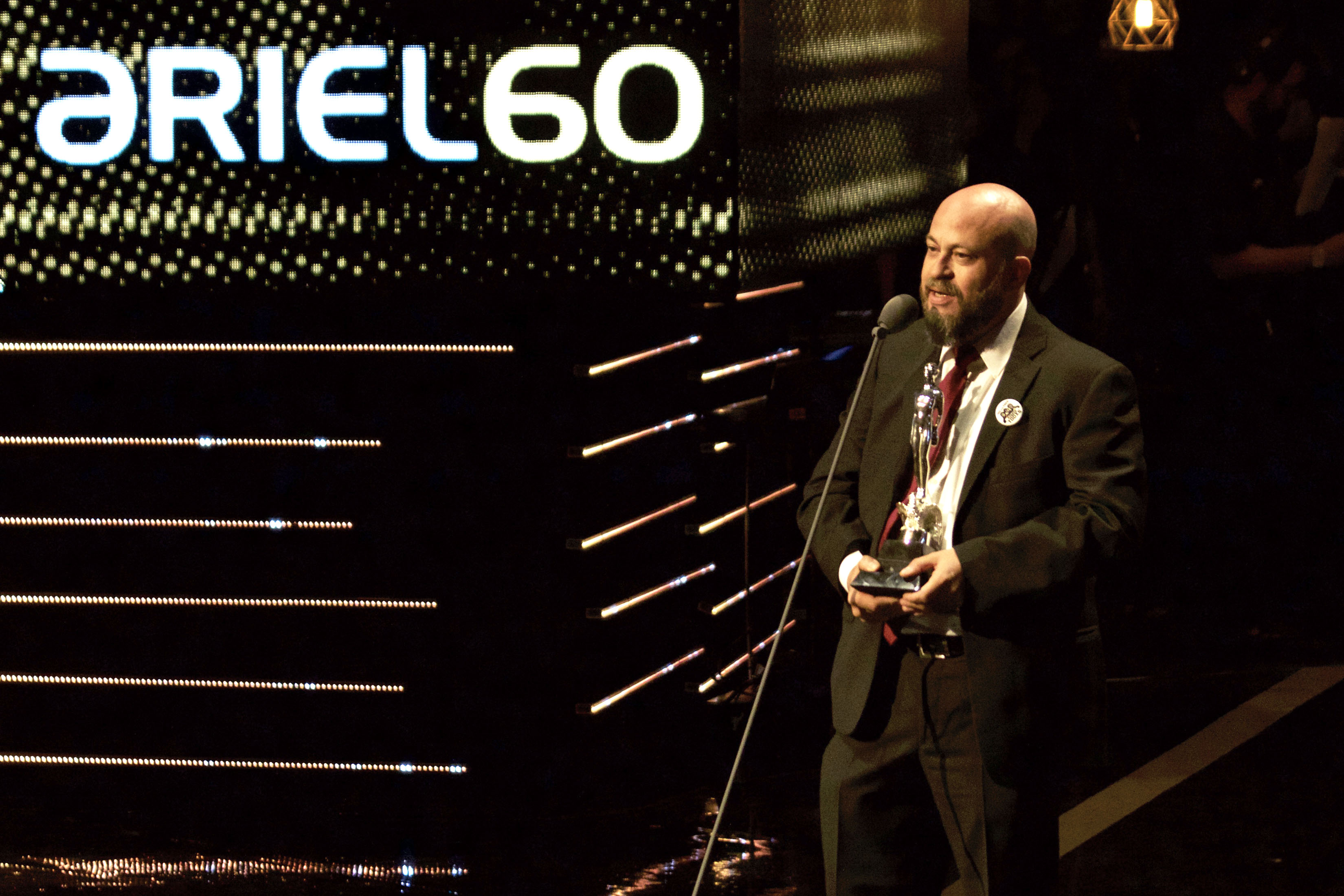
Everardo González, Best Documentary Feature winner

=== Awards ===
The following list includes nominees and winners will be highlighted with boldface and a ‡ symbol.

**Best Picture**: **Sueño en Otro Idioma – Agencia Sha, Revolver Ámsterdam, FOPROCINE, Estudios Churubusco Azteca, and EFICINE**‡; Batallas Íntimas – Caguama producciones (CasaDeLou), FOPROCINE, and IMCINE; La Libertad del Diablo – Artegios and Animal de Luz Films; La Región Salvaje – Mantarraya Producciones and Tres Tunas; Tiempo Compartido – Piano	**Best Director**: **Amat Escalante – La Región Salvaje**‡; Natalia Beristáin – Los Adioses; Lucía Gajá – Batallas Íntimas; Everardo González – La Libertad del Diablo; Issa López – Vuelven
**Best Actor**: **Eligio Meléndez – Sueño en Otro Idioma as Evaristo**‡; Leonardo Alonso – El Vigilante as Salvador; Humberto Busto – Oso Polar as Heriberto; Daniel Giménez Cacho – Los Adioses as Ricardo Guerra Tejada; Gabino Rodríguez – Los Crímenes de Mar del Norte as Goyo Cárdenas	**Best Actress**: **Karina Gidi – Los Adioses as Rosario Castellanos**‡; Ángeles Cruz – Tamara y la Catarina as Tamara; Cassandra Ciangherotti – Tiempo Compartido as Eva; Angelina Peláez – Tamara y la Catarina as Doña Meche; Arcelia Ramírez – Verónica as Verónica de la Serna
**Best Supporting Actor**: **Miguel Rodarte – Tiempo Compartido as Andrés**‡; Juan Pablo de Santiago – Sueño en Otro Idioma as Evaristo; Pedro de Tavira – Los Adioses as Ricardo Guerra Tejada; Emilio Echevarría – El Elegido as Coronel Salazar; Hoze Meléndez – Sueño en Otro Idioma as Isauro	**Best Supporting Actress**: **Verónica Toussaint – Oso Polar as Flor**‡; Simone Bucio – La Región Salvaje as Verónica; Tessa Ia – Los Adioses as Rosario Castellanos; Joanna Larequi – Las Hijas de Abril as Clara; Fátima Molina – Sueño en Otro Idioma as Lluvia
**Best Actor in a Minor Role**: **Andrés Almeida – Tiempo Compartido as Abel**‡; Norman Delgadillo – Los Crímenes de Mar del Norte as Jorge Roldán; Héctor Holten – El Vigilante as Oficial Serrano; Tenoch Huerta – Vuelven as El Chino; Hernán Mendoza – Las Hijas de Abril as Gregorio	**Best Actress in a Minor Role**: **Bernarda Trueba – La Región Salvaje as Marta Vega**‡; Norma Angélica – Sueño en Otro Idioma as Flaviana; Vico Escorcia – Los Crímenes de Mar del Norte as Paquita; Mónica Miguel – Sueño en Otro Idioma as Jacinta; Mercedes Pascual – Tamara y la Catarina as Doña Amalia
**Breakthrough Male Performance**: **Juan Ramón López – Vuelven as El Shine**‡; Luis Amaya Rodríguez – Ayúdame a Pasar la Noche as Carlos; Luis de la Rosa – Mientras el Lobo No Está as Alex; Máximo Hollander – Los Herederos as Coyo; Jesús Meza – La Región Salvaje as Ángel	**Breakthrough Female Performance**: **Ana Valeria Becerril – Las Hijas de Abril as Valeria**‡; Macarena Arias – Alba as Alba; Nicolasa Ortíz Monasterio – Sueño en Otro Idioma as María; Paola Lara – Vuelven as Estrella; Ruth Ramos – La Región Salvaje as Alejandra
**Best Original Screenplay**: **Sueño en Otro Idioma – Carlos Contreras**‡; La Libertad del Diablo – Everardo González and Diego Enrique Osorno; La Región Salvaje – Amat Escalante and Gibrán Portela; Tiempo Compartido – Sebastián Hofmann and Julio Chavezmontes; Vuelven – Issa López	**Best First Feature Film**: **El Vigilante – Diego Ros**‡; Ayúdame a Pasar la Noche – José Ramón Chávez; Los Años Azules – Sofía Gómez Córdova; Mientras el Lobo No Está – Joseph Hemsani; Plaza de la Soledad – Maya Goded
**Best Ibero-American Film**: **Una Mujer Fantástica (Chile) – Sebastián Lelio**‡; Aquarius (Brazil) – Kleber Mendonça Filho; La Mujer del Animal (Colombia) – Víctor Gaviria; Últimos Días en La Habana (Cuba) – Fernando Pérez; Zama (Argentina) – Lucrecia Martel	**Best Documentary Feature**: **La Libertad del Diablo – Everardo González**‡; Batallas Íntimas – Lucía Gajá; El Maíz en los Tiempos de Guerra – Alberto Cortés; Plaza de la Soledad – Maya Goded; Un Exilio: Película Familiar – Juan Francisco Urrusti
**Best Documentary Short Subject**: **La Muñeca Tetona – Diego Enrique Osorno and Alexandro Aldrete**‡; Artemio – Sandra Luz López; Juan Perros – Rodrigo Ímaz; Relato Familiar – Sumie García; Tecuani, Hombre Jaguar – Isis Alejandra Ahumada and Nelson Omar Aldape	**Best Animated Short**: **Cerulia – Sofía Carrillo**‡; Amor, Nuestra Prisión – Carolina Corral; Nos Faltan – Lucía Gajá and Emilio Ramos; Poliangular – Alexandra Castellanos; Última Estación – Héctor Dávila
**Best Live Action Short**: **Oasis – Alejandro Zuno**‡; Chambelán – Fabián León; La Ramona – Antonio de Jesús Sánchez; Libre de Culpa – Santiago Arriaga and Mariana Arriaga; Mamartuile – Alejandro Saevich	**Best Original Score**: **Sueño en Otro Idioma – Andrés Sánchez Maher**‡; Batallas Íntimas – Jacobo Lieberman and Leonardo Heiblum; La Libertad del Diablo – Quincas Moreira; La Región Salvaje – Guro Moe; Plaza de la Soledad – Jacobo Lieberman and Leonardo Heiblum
**Best Film Editing**: **La Región Salvaje – Fernanda de la Peza and Jacob Secher Schulsinger**‡; Batalla Íntimas – Francisco X. Rivera, Lucía Gajá, and Mariana Rodríguez; La Libertad del Diablo – Paloma López Carrillo; Plaza de la Soledad – Valentina Leduc; Vuelven – Joaquim Marti	**Best Sound**: **Sueño en Otro Idioma – Enrique Greiner, Pablo Tamez, and Raymundo Ballesteros**‡; La Habitación – Antonio Diego, Jorge Juárez, Tomasz Dukszta and Omar Juárez; La Libertad del Diablo – Matías Barberis, Jaime Baksht, Michelle Couttolenc, Bernat Fortiana, and Pablo Tamez; La Región Salvaje – Raúl Locatelli, Sergio Díaz, and Vincent Arnandi; Vuelven – Emilio Cortés, Martin Hernández, Jaime Baksht, Michelle Couttolenc, and Alejandro Quevedo
**Best Cinematography**: **Sueño en Otro Idioma – Tonatiuh Martínez**‡; El Elegido – Guillermo Granillo; La Habitación – Guillermo Granillo and Bogumil Godfrejów; La Libertad del Diablo – María José Secco; Los Adioses – Dariela Ludlow	**Best Art Direction**: **El Elegido – Antonio Muñohierro**‡; **La Habitación – Carlos Jacques**‡; Los Adioses – Carlos Jacques; Sueño en Otro Idioma – Bárbara Enríquez; Vuelven – Ana Solares
**Best Costume Design**: **La Habitación – Mariestela Fernández and Gabriela Diaque**‡; El Elegido – Mercè Paloma; Los Adioses – Anna Terrazas; Los Crímenes de Mar del Norte – Fernanda Vélez; Sueño en Otro Idioma – Gabriela Fernández	**Best Makeup**: **Vuelven – Adam Zoller**‡; El Elegido – Maru Errando and Carlos Sánchez; La Habitación – Carlos Sánchez and Itzel Peña; Los Crímenes de Mar del Norte – Nury Alamo; Sueño en Otro Idioma – Maripaz Robles
**Best Special Effects**: **La Región Salvaje – José Manuel Martínez**‡; El Elegido – Lluis Rivera and Alejandro Vázquez; La Habitación – Arturo Godínez; Purasangre – Yoshiro Hernández; Sueño en Otro Idioma – Alejandro Vázquez	**Best Visual Effects**: **La Región Salvaje – Peter Hjorth**‡; El Elegido – Lluís Castells; La Habitación – Radoslaw Rekita; Mientras el Lobo No Está – Raúl Prado; Vuelven – Raúl Prado, Juan Carlos Lepe and Edgar Piña

== Ceremony information ==
=== Ceremony ===
Ernesto Contreras, announced that the award ceremony was to be held at the Palacio de Bellas Artes in Mexico City on July 5, 2018, and dedicated to film directors. The ceremony was broadcast by Canal 22, TV UNAM, and also at the Cineteca Nacional, where 400 film students were invited. He also mentioned that 144 films were submitted for consideration, including 41 feature films, 17 documentary features, 73 short films, and 13 Iberoamerican feature films. The Golden Ariel was awarded to Mexican actress Queta Lavat for her outstanding career, and to cinematographer Toni Kuhn for his influence on new filmmakers.

=== Films ===
Four nominated films for Best Picture had been awarded on several international film festivals. Sueño en Otro Idioma received the World Cinema Audience Award: Dramatic at the 2017 Sundance Film Festival. Amat Escalante won the Silver Lion at the 73rd Venice International Film Festival for La Región Salvaje. La Libertad del Diablo earned the accolades for Best Mexican Film, Best Documentary, and Best Cinematography at the Guadalajara International Film Festival in 2017. Julio Chavezmontes and Sebastián Hofmann won the World Cinema Dramatic Special Jury Award for Screenwriting for Tiempo Compartido at the Sundance Film Festival. Sofía Gómez Córdova, winner for Best Director for Los Años Azules, Ayúdame a Pasar la Noche, Audience Award winner, and Cerulia, that won for Best Animated Short Film at the Guadalajara Film Festival in 2017, also received Ariel Awards nominations in 2018. El Vigilante, won Best Mexican Film and Best Actor (Leonardo Alonso) at the Morelia International Film Festival in 2016. Issa López, nominated for the Ariel Award for Best Director for Vuelven, received the same award at the Diosas de Plata in 2018.

== Multiple nominations and awards ==
The following films received multiple nominations:

Nominations	Film
16	Sueño en Otro Idioma
12	La Región Salvaje
10	Vuelven
8	Los Adioses
8	La Libertad del Diablo
7	El Elegido
7	La Habitación
5	Batallas Íntimas
5	Los Crímenes de Mar del Norte
5	Tiempo Compartido
3	El Vigilante
3	Las Hijas de Abril
3	Mientras el Lobo No Está
3	Plaza de la Soledad
3	Tamara y la Catarina
2	Ayúdame a Pasar la Noche
2	Oso Polar

Films that received multiple awards:

Awards	Film
6	Sueño en Otro Idioma
5	La Región Salvaje
2	La Habitación
2	Tiempo Compartido
2	Vuelven
