= Ariel Award for Best Actor =

Ariel Award category

- Awarded for: Best Performance by an Actor in a Leading Role
- Country: Mexico
- Presented by: AMACC
- First award: 1947
- Currently held by: Osvaldo Sánchez, En El Camino (2026)
- Website: premioariel.com.mx

The Ariel Award for Best Actor (Spanish: Premio Ariel a Mejor Actor) is an award presented by the Academia Mexicana de Artes y Ciencias Cinematográficas (AMACC) in Mexico. It is given in honor of an actor who has delivered an outstanding performance in a leading role while working within the Mexican film industry. In 1947, the 1st and 2nd Ariel Awards were held, with Domingo Soler and David Silva winning for the films La Barraca and Campeón Sin Corona, respectively. With the exception of the years 1959 to 1971, when the Ariel Awards were suspended, the award has been given annually. Nominees and winners are determined by a committee formed every year consisting of academy members (active and honorary), previous winners and individuals with at least two Ariel nominations; the committee members submit their votes through the official AMACC website.

Since its inception, the award has been given to 52 actors. Damián Alcázar has received the most awards in this category with five Ariels and also is the most nominated performer with eight nominations; Arturo de Córdova and Pedro Infante follow with seven nominations each. Actors Pedro Armendáriz and Pedro Armendáriz, Jr., father and son, also won the award for Best Actor. In 1972, Alfonso Arau won for his self-directed leading role in El Águila Descalza. Spanish actor Javier Bardem was nominated in 2011 for his performance in Biutiful, for which he was also nominated for the Academy Award and a BAFTA Award, and won the Goya and the Prix d'interprétation masculine at the Cannes Film Festival.

Six films have featured two nominated performances for Best Actor, De Todos Modos Juan Te Llamas (Jorge Russek and Juan Ferrara), Cuartelazo (Héctor Ortega and Bruno Rey), Vidas Errantes (José Carlos Ruiz and Ignacio Guadalupe), Chido Guan, El Tacos de Oro (Fernando Arau and Mario Almada), Dulces Compañías (Roberto Cobo and Ramiro Huerta), and 600 Millas (Kristyan Ferrer and Tim Roth); Russek and Ruiz won the award. As of the 2026 ceremony, Osvaldo Sánchez is the most recent winner for his role in the film En El Camino.

== Winners and nominees ==
Table key
‡	Indicates the winner

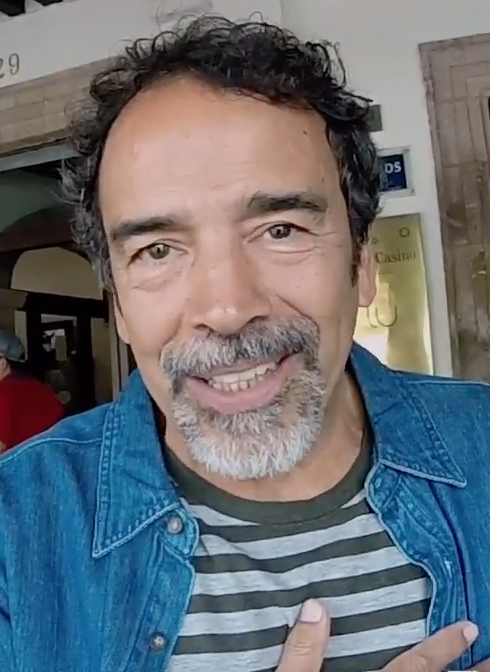
Five times winner, Mexican actor Damián Alcázar

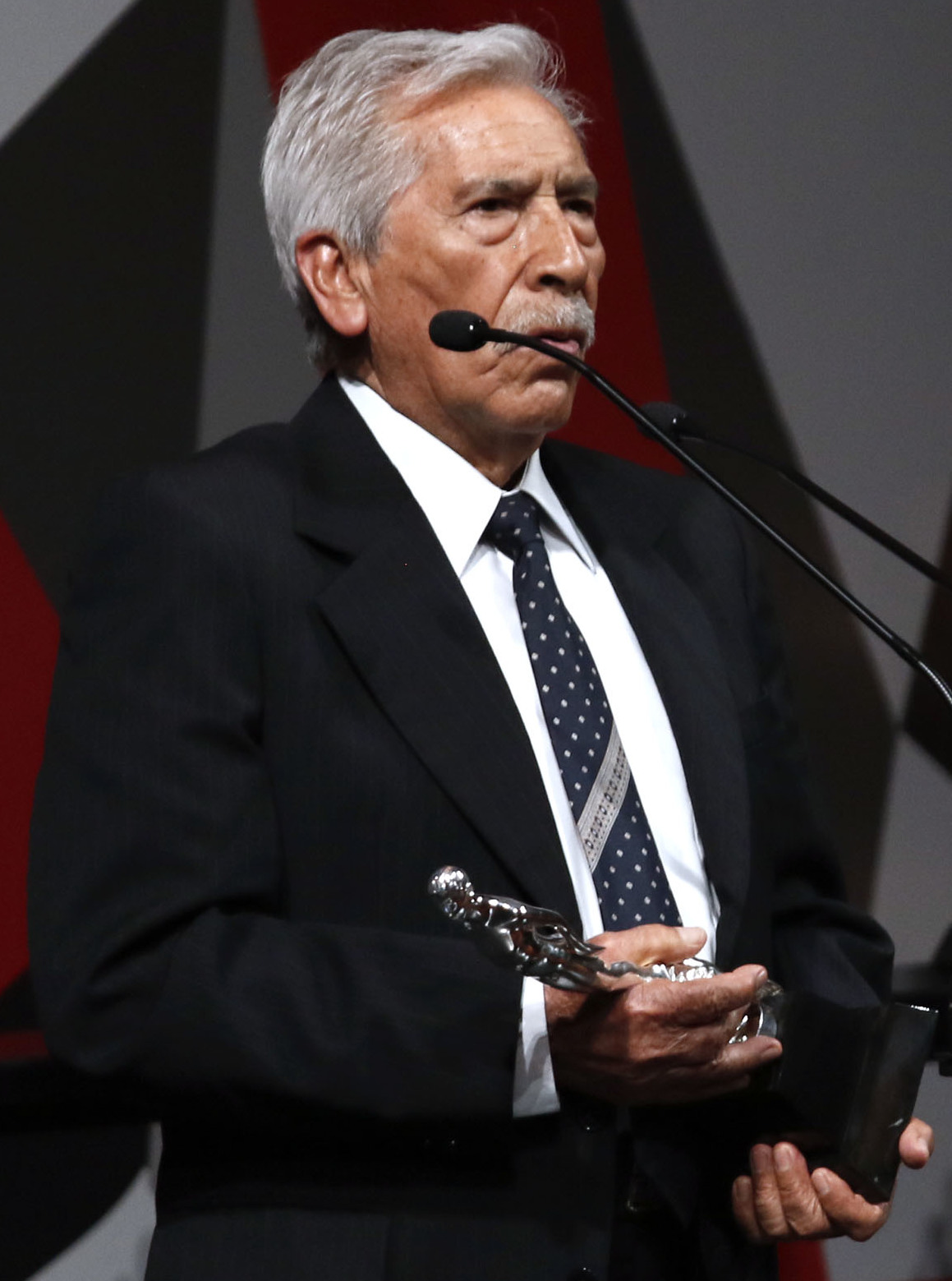
Three time winner, Mexican actor José Carlos Ruiz

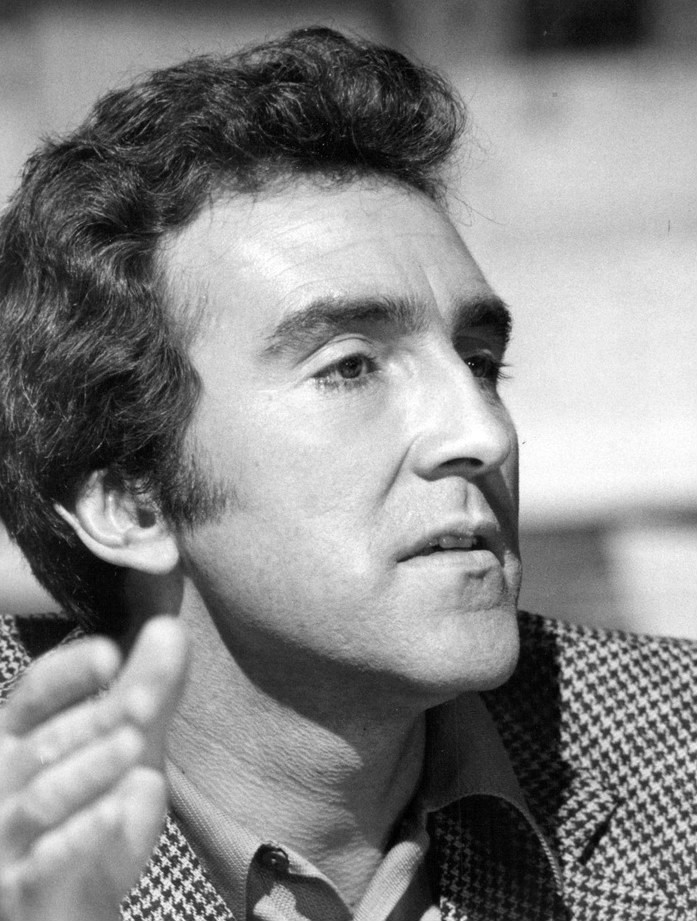
Mexican actor Pedro Armendáriz Jr. won in 1977 for Mina, Viento de Libertad.

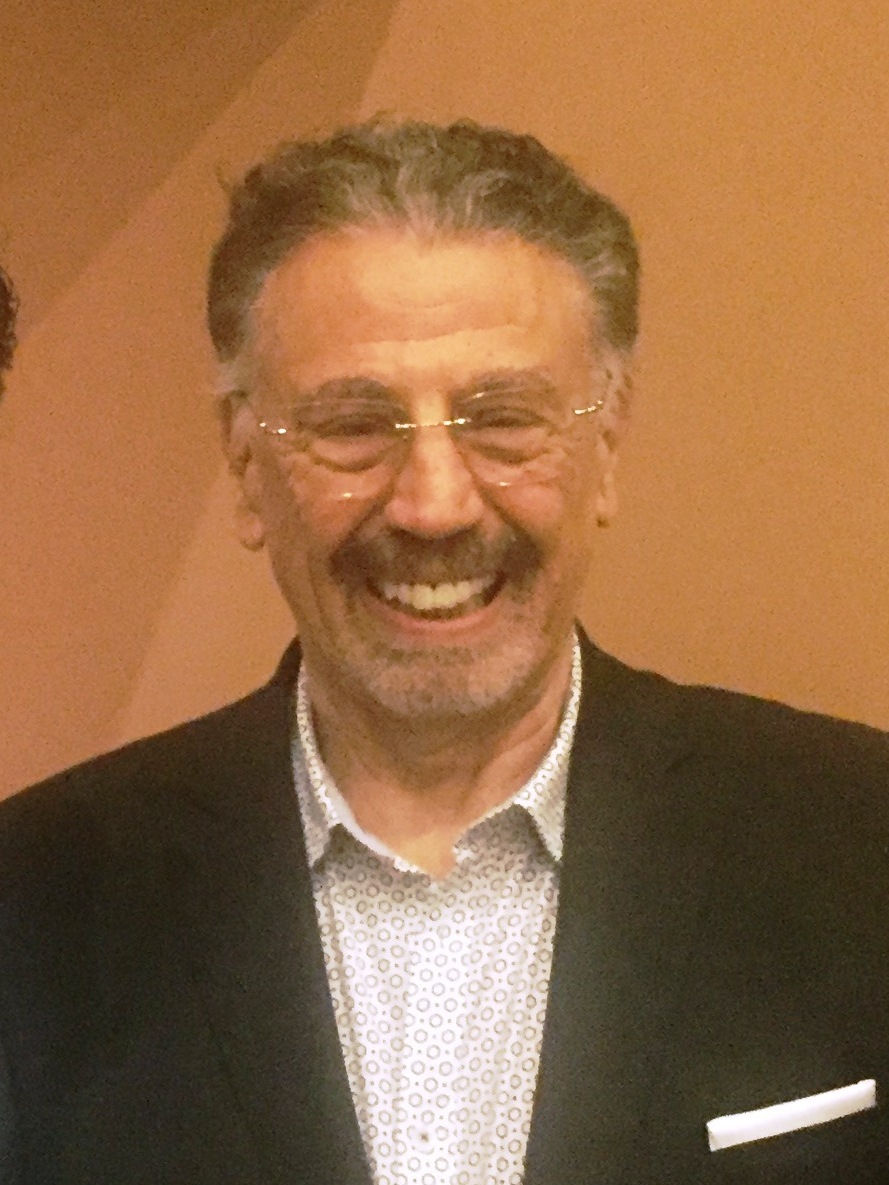
Mexican actor Alfonso Arau was nominated twice and won once in 1972 for El Águila Descalza.

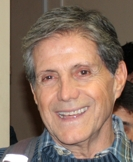
Mexican actor Héctor Bonilla won twice for Meridiano 100 (1975) and Rojo Amanecer (1991).

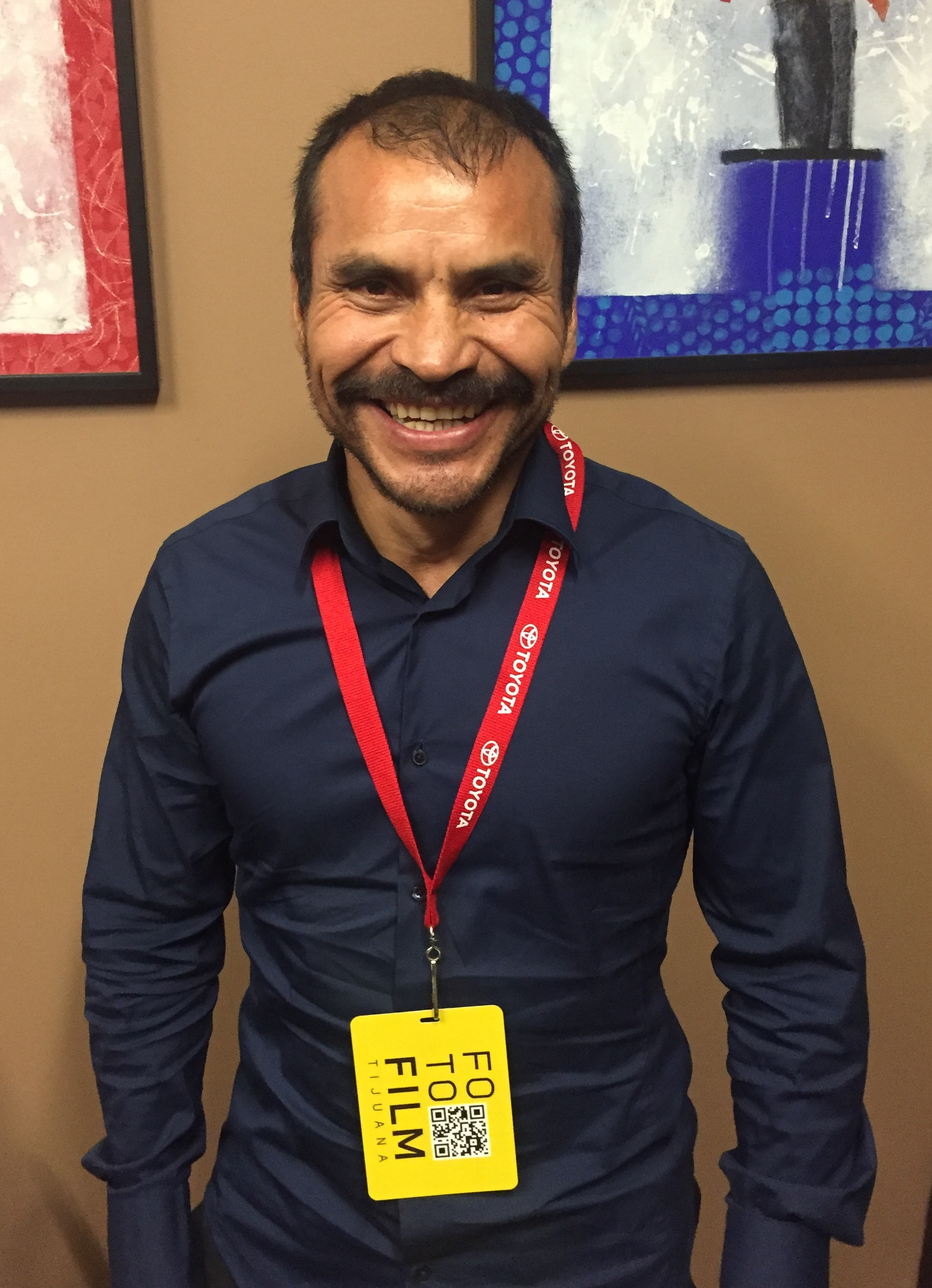
Mexican actor Noé Hernández won for Ocho de Cada Diez in 2019 and for Kokoloko in 2024.

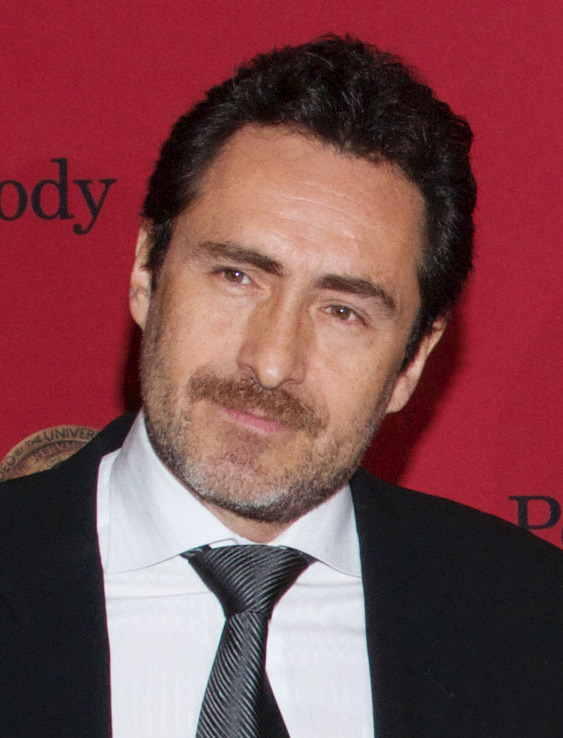
Mexican actor Demián Bichir won for Hasta Morir in 1995.

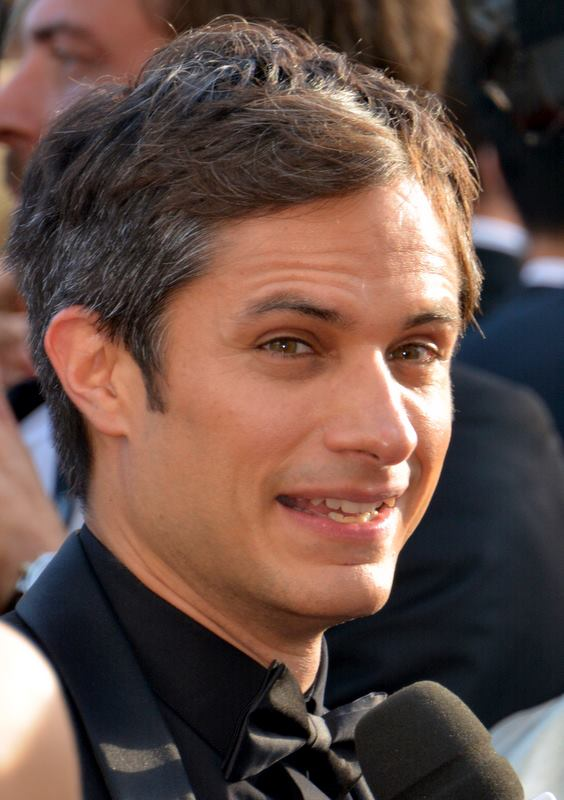
Mexican actor Gael García Bernal won for Amores Perros in 2001.

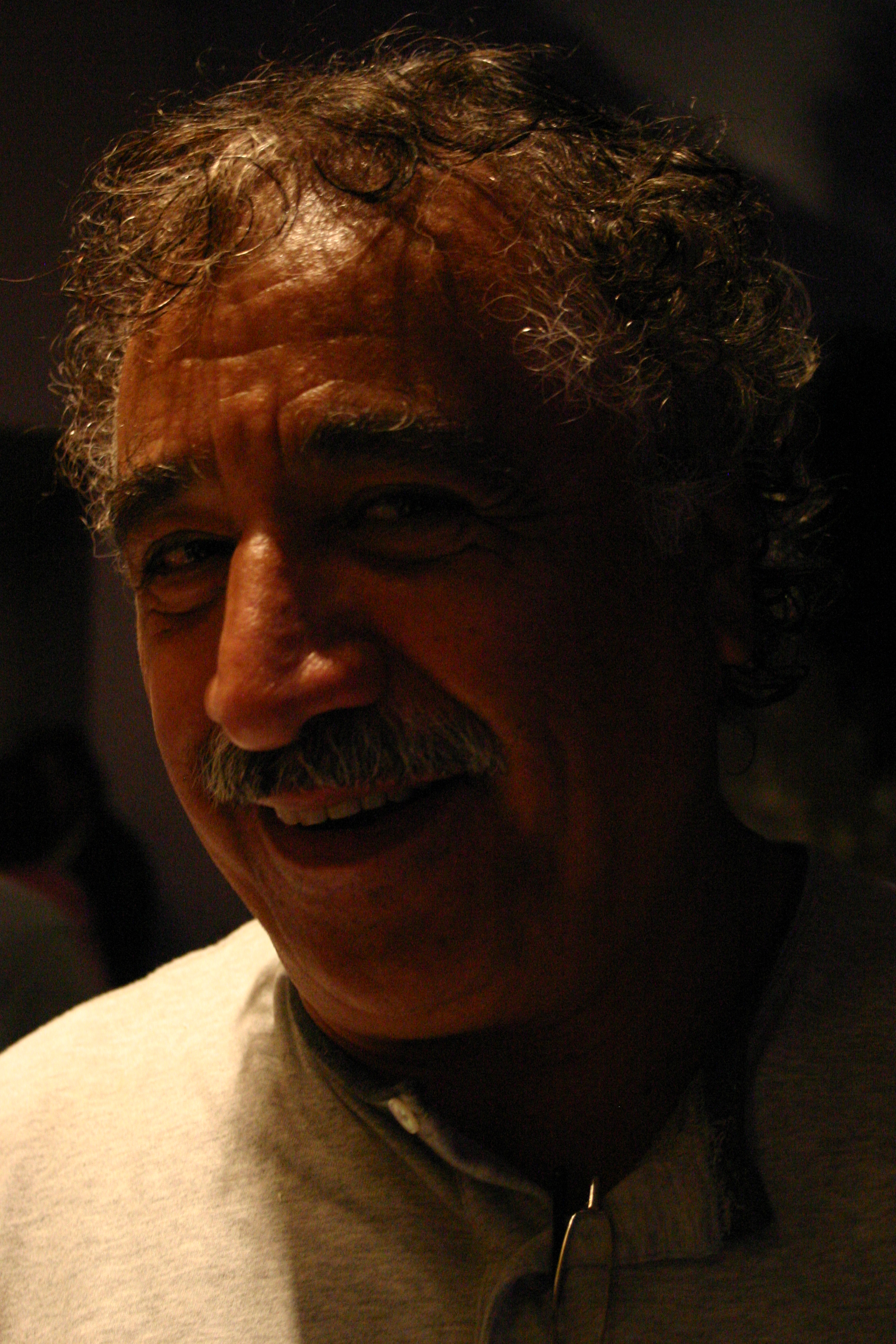
Mexican actor Rafael Inclán won for Nicotina in 2001.

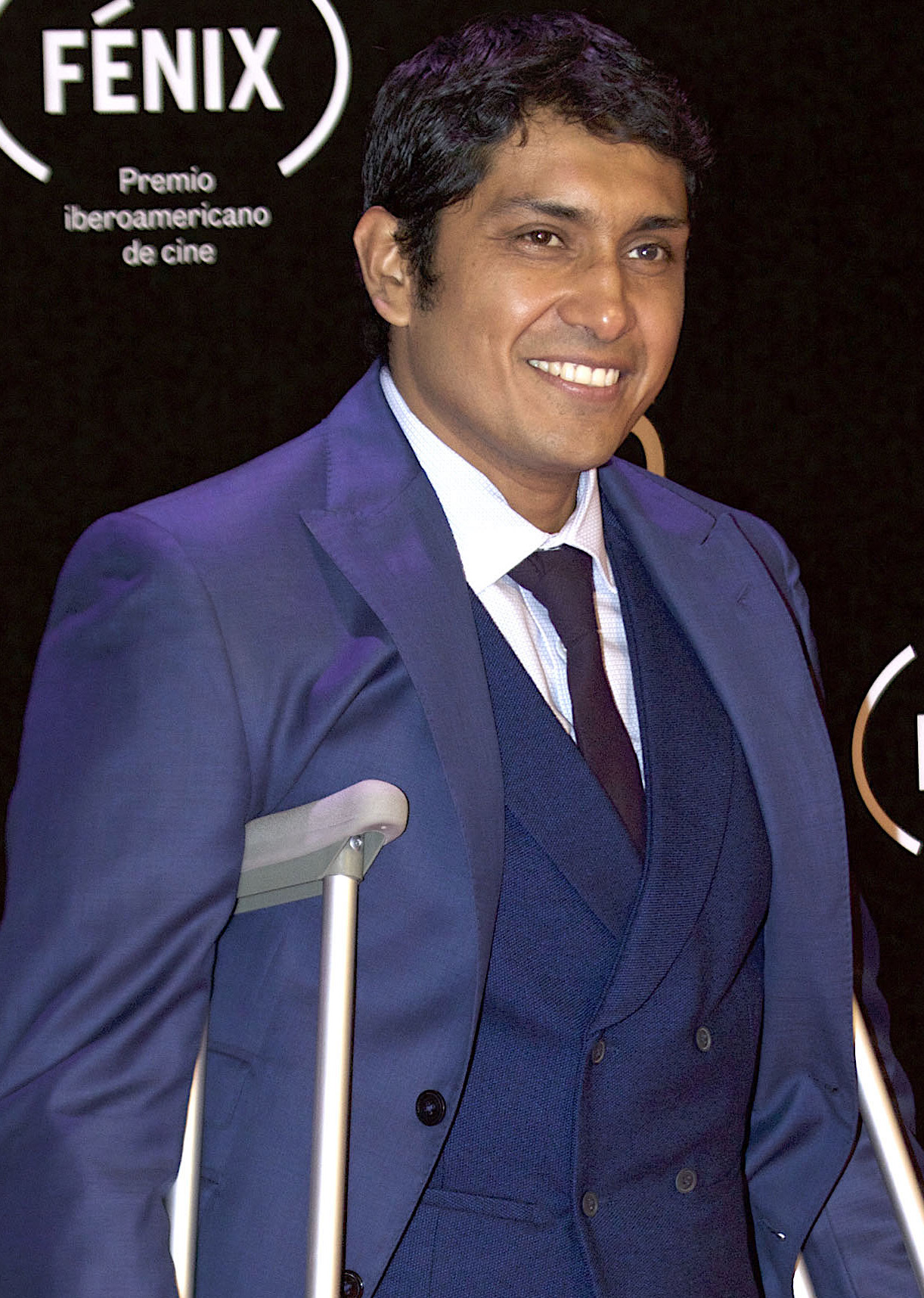
Mexican actor Tenoch Huerta has been nominated three times and won once for Días de Gracia in 2012.

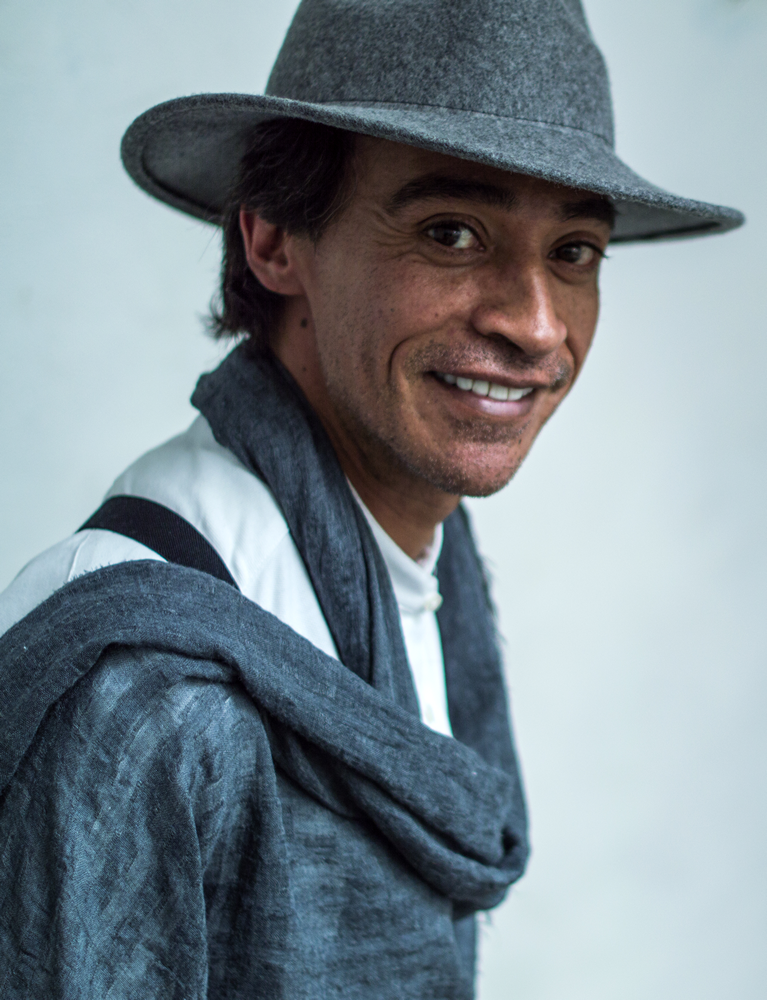
Roberto Sosa was nominated four times and won in 2013 for El Fantástico Mundo de Juan Orol.

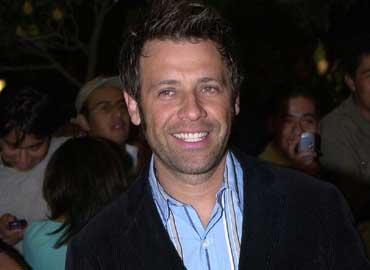
Mexican actor Juan Manuel Bernal won for Obediencia Perfecta in 2015.

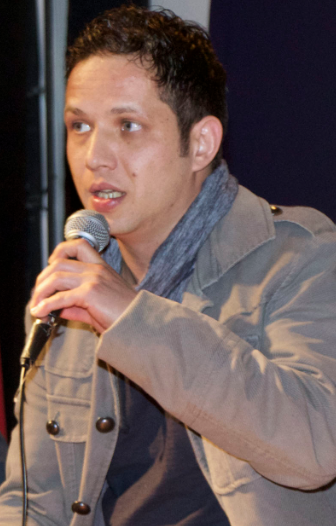
Mexican actor Adrián Ladrón won for La 4ª Compañía in 2017.

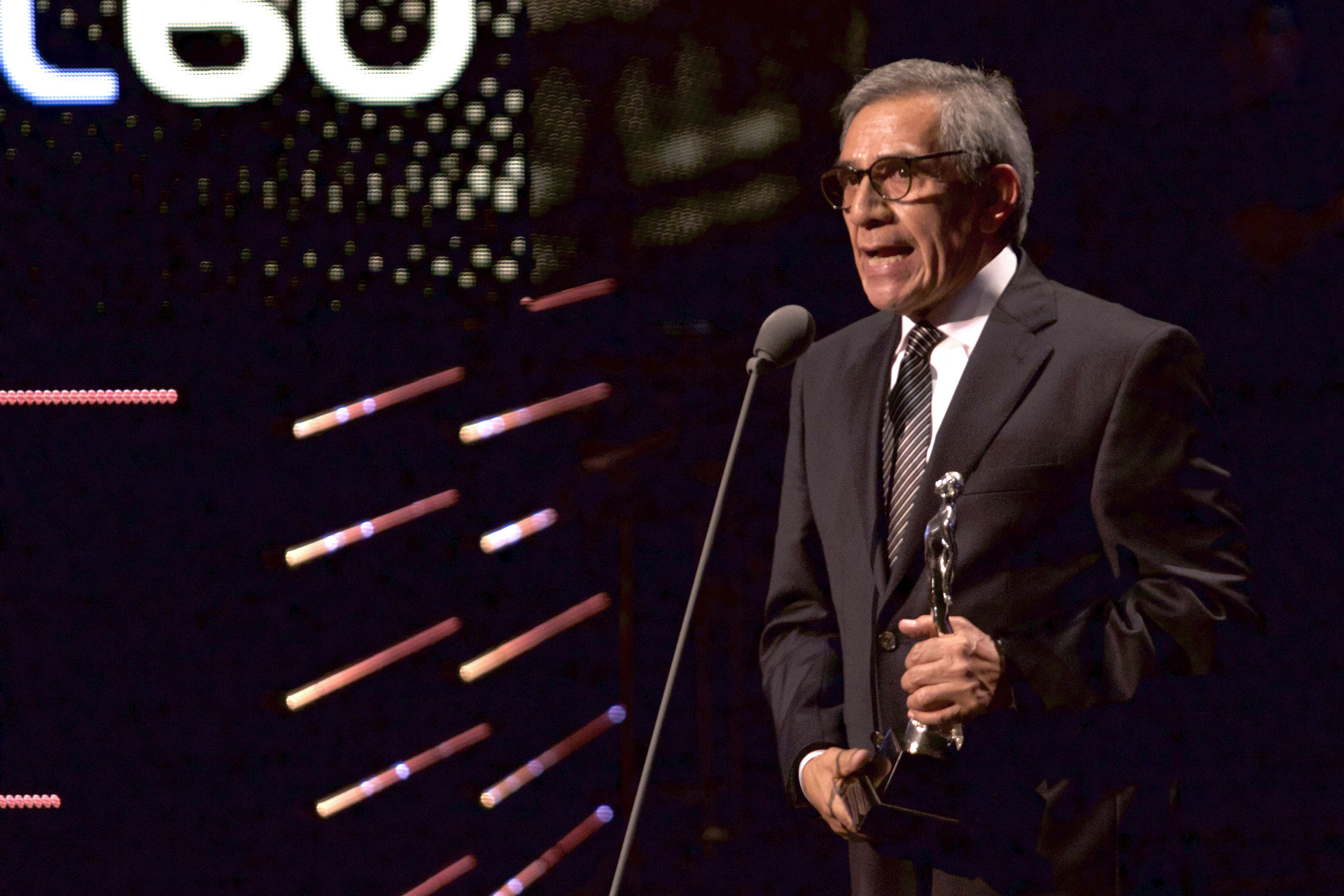
Mexican actor Eligio Meléndez won for Sueño en Otro Idioma in 2018.

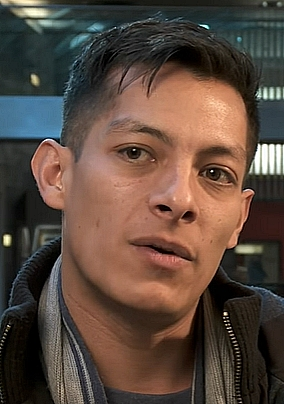
Mexican actor Luis Alberti won for Mano de Obra in 2020.

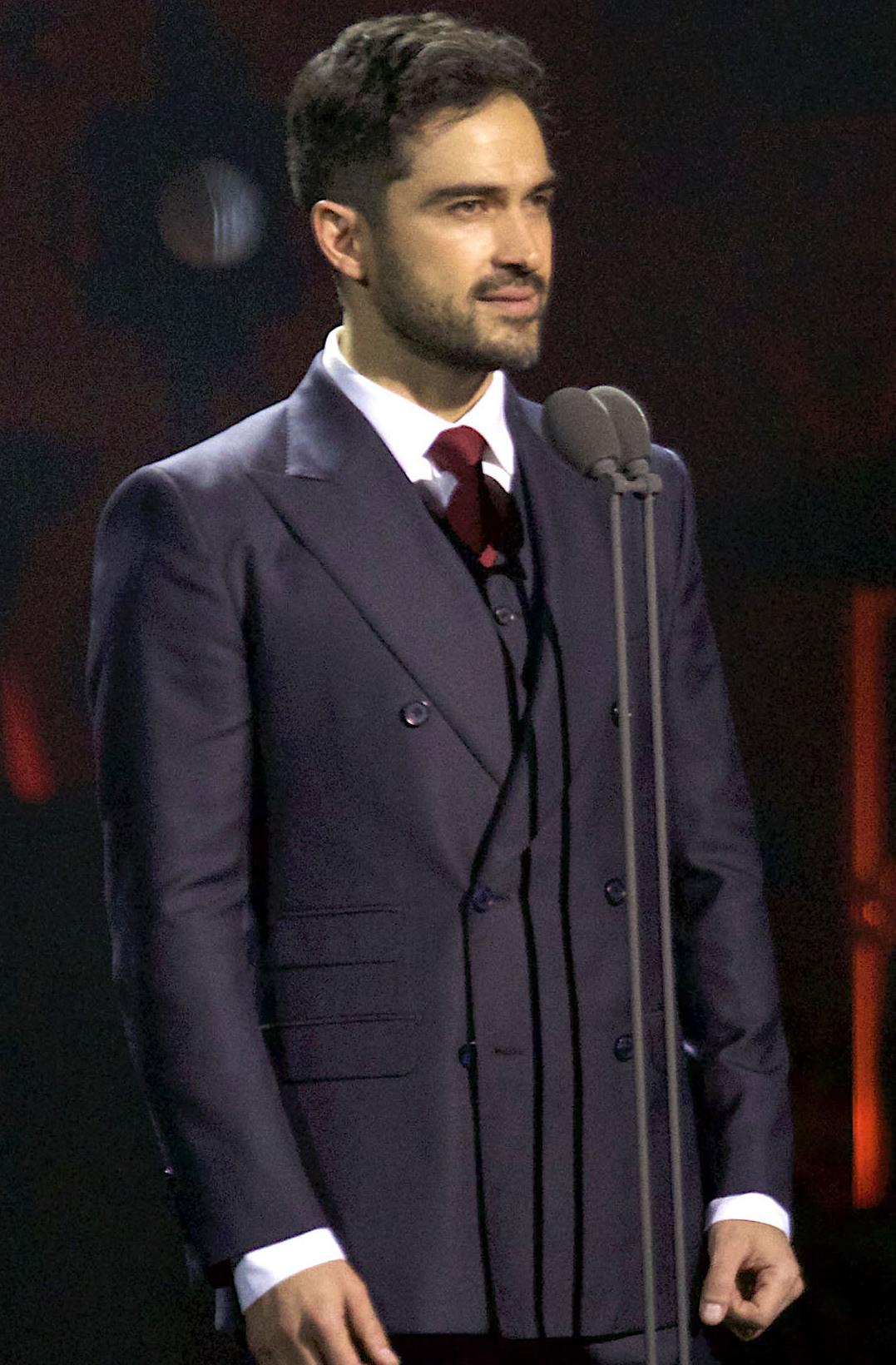
Mexican actor Alfonso Herrera won for El baile de los 41 in 2021.

Year	Best Actor(s)	Film	Ref.
1947 (1st)	Domingo Soler‡	La Barraca	
1947 (1st)	Pedro Armendáriz	Las Abandonadas	
1947 (1st)	Arturo de Córdova	La Selva de Fuego	
1947 (2nd)	David Silva‡	Campeón Sin Corona	
1947 (2nd)	Pedro Armendáriz	Enamorada	
1947 (2nd)	Antonio Badú	Cantaclaro	
1948 (3rd)	Pedro Armendáriz‡	La Perla	
1948 (3rd)	Pedro Infante	Cuando Lloran los Valientes	
1948 (3rd)	Julián Soler	El Secreto de Juan Palomo	
1949 (4th)	Carlos López Moctezuma‡	Río Escondido	
1949 (4th)	Pedro Infante	Los Tres Huastecos	
1949 (4th)	David Silva	¡Esquina Bajan!	
1950 (5th)	Roberto Cañedo‡	Pueblerina	
1950 (5th)	Arturo de Córdova	Medianoche	
1950 (5th)	Pedro Infante	La Oveja Negra	
1951 (6th)	Fernando Soler‡	No Desearás a La Mujer de Tu Hijo	
1951 (6th)	Pedro Armendáriz	Rosauro Castro	
1951 (6th)	Arturo de Córdova	El Hombre Sin Rostro	
1952 (7th)	Arturo de Córdova‡	En La Palma de Tu Mano	
1952 (7th)	Roberto Cañedo	Crimen y Castigo	
1952 (7th)	Fernando Soler	El Grito de la Carne	
1953 (8th)	Pedro Armendáriz‡	El Rebozo de Soledad	
1953 (8th)	Arturo de Cordova	Mi Esposa y la Otra	
1953 (8th)	Pedro Infante	Un Rincón Cerca del Cielo	
1954 (9th)	Arturo de Córdova‡	Las Tres Perfectas Casadas	
1954 (9th)	Julio Villarreal	Eugenia Grandet	
1954 (9th)	Pedro Infante	Pepe El Toro	
1955 (10th)	Víctor Parra‡	Los Fernández de Peralvillo	
1955 (10th)	Pedro Armendáriz	La Rebelión de los Colgados	
1955 (10th)	Pedro López Lagar	El Gran Autor	
1956 (11th)	Pedro Infante‡	La Vida No Vale Nada	
1956 (11th)	Ernesto Alonso	Ensayo de un Crimen	
1956 (11th)	David Silva	Espaldas Mojadas	
1957 (12th)	Víctor Manuel Mendoza‡	Talpa	
1957 (12th)	Carlos Baena	Adán y Eva	
1957 (12th)	Adalberto Martínez	El Rey de Mexico	
1958 (13th)	Arturo de Córdova‡	Feliz Año, Amor Mío	
1958 (13th)	Pedro Infante	Tizoc	
1958 (13th)	Carlos Montalbán	Bambalinas	
1959—1971	Not awarded		
1973 (15th)	Ignacio López Tarso‡	Rosa Blanca	
1973 (15th)	Alfonso Arau	El Rincón de las Vírgenes	
1973 (15th)	Jorge Martínez de Hoyos	Los Días del Amor	
1974 (16th)	Pancho Córdova‡	"Caridad" (episode from Fe, Esperanza y Caridad)	
1974 (16th)	Sergio Jiménez	El Cambio	
1974 (16th)	Ignacio López Tarso	El Profeta Mimí	
1975 (17th)	Héctor Bonilla‡	Meridiano 100	
1975 (17th)	Ignacio López Tarso	Rapiña	
1975 (17th)	Jorge Martínez de Hoyos	La Venida del Rey Olmos	
1976 (18th)	Jorge Russek‡	De Todos Modos Juan Te Llamas	
1976 (18th)	Juan Ferrara	De Todos Modos Juan Te Llamas	
1976 (18th)	Enrique Lucero	Canoa	
1977 (19th)	Pedro Armendáriz, Jr.‡	Mina, Viento de Libertad	
1977 (19th)	Héctor Ortega	Cuartelazo	
1977 (19th)	Bruno Rey	Cuartelazo	
1978 (20th)	Roberto Cobo‡	En el Lugar Sin Limites	
1978 (20th)	Pedro Armendáriz, Jr.	Los Pequeños Privilegios	
1978 (20th)	Héctor Bonilla	Matinée	
1979 (21st)	José Alonso‡	En La Trampa	
1979 (21st)	Héctor Bonilla	Bloody Marlene	
1979 (21st)	Nelson Villagra	El Recurso del Método	
1980 (22nd)	Manuel Ojeda‡	El Infierno de Todos Tan Temido	
1980 (22nd)	Manuel Ojeda	Fuego en el Mar	
1980 (22nd)	Valentín Trujillo	Perro Callejero	
1981 (23rd)	Juan Ferrara‡	Misterio	
1981 (23rd)	Eric del Castillo	Las Grandes Aguas	
1981 (23rd)	Carlos Riquelme	En la Tormenta	
1982 (24th)	Alejandro Parodi‡	Llámenme Mike	
1982 (24th)	Pedro Armendáriz, Jr.	Rastro de Muerte	
1982 (24th)	Manuel Ojeda	¡Ora Sí Tenemos Que Ganar!	
1983 (25th)	Ernesto Gómez Cruz‡	La Víspera	
1983 (25th)	Sergio Jiménez	La Pachanga	
1983 (25th)	Noé Murayama	La Pachanga	
1984 (26th)	Humberto Zurita‡	Bajo la Metralla	
1984 (26th)	Mario Almada	La Viuda Negra	
1984 (26th)	Miguel Ángel Ferriz	El Tonto Que Hacía Milagros	
1985 (27th)	José Carlos Ruiz‡	Vidas Errantes	
1985 (27th)	Ignacio Guadalupe	Vidas Errantes	
1985 (27th)	Rafael Sánchez Navarro	El Otro	
1986 (28th)	Claudio Brook‡	Memoriales Perdidos	
1986 (28th)	Alonso Echánove	Los Motivos de Luz	
1986 (28th)	Alfredo Sevilla	Redondo	
1987 (29th)	Ernesto Gómez Cruz‡	El Imperio de la Fortuna	
1987 (29th)	Fernando Arau	Chido Guan, El Tacos de Oro	
1987 (29th)	Mario Almada	Chido Guan, El Tacos de Oro	
1988 (30th)	Gonzalo Vega‡	Lo Que Importa es Vivir	
1988 (30th)	Fernando Balzaretti	Días Dificiles	
1988 (30th)	Manuel Ojeda	Muelle Rojo	
1989 (31st)	Alonso Echánove‡	Mentiras Piadosas	
1989 (31st)	Alberto Pedret	¿Nos Traicionará el Presidente?	
1989 (31st)	Bruno Rey	El Jinete de la Divina Providencia	
1990 (32nd)	José Carlos Ruiz‡	Goitia, Un Dios Para Sí Mismo	
1990 (32nd)	Roberto "Flaco" Guzmán	Sabadazo	
1990 (32nd)	Enrique Rocha	El Otro Crimen	
1991 (33rd)	Héctor Bonilla‡	Rojo Amanecer	
1992 (34th)	Mario Iván Martínez‡	Como Agua Para Chocolate	
1992 (34th)	José Alonso	La Tarea	
1992 (34th)	Eduardo López Rojas	La Mujer de Benjamín	
1993 (35th)	Alonso Echánove‡	Modelo Antiguo	
1993 (35th)	José Alonso	Bartolomé de las Casas (La Leyenda Negra)	
1993 (35th)	Roberto Sosa	Ángel de Fuego	
1994 (36th)	Bruno Bichir‡	Principio y Fin	
1994 (36th)	Rodolfo de Anda	Kino	
1994 (36th)	Alonso Echánove	La Vida Conyugal	
1994 (36th)	Arturo Ríos	Desiertos Mares	
1994 (36th)	Jorge Russek	La Última Batalla	
1994 (36th)	Roberto Sosa	Lolo	
1995 (37th)	Demián Bichir‡	Hasta Morir	
1995 (37th)	Damián Alcázar	Dos Crimenes	
1995 (37th)	Bruno Bichir	El Jardín del Edén	
1995 (37th)	Ernesto Gómez Cruz	El Callejón de los Milagros	
1995 (37th)	Luis Felipe Tovar	Bienvenido — Welcome	
1996 (38th)	Fernando Torre Lapham‡	Sin Remitente	
1996 (38th)	José Alonso	Mujeres Insumisas	
1996 (38th)	Bruno Bichir	El Anzuelo	
1996 (38th)	Roberto Cobo	Dulces Compañías	
1996 (38th)	Ramiro Huerta	Dulces Compañías	
1997 (39th)	Daniel Giménez Cacho‡	Profundo Carmesí	
1997 (39th)	Demián Bichir	Cilantro y Perejil	
1997 (39th)	Héctor Bonilla	Luces de la Noche	
1997 (39th)	Rafael Cortés	Santo Luzbel	
1998 (40th)	Jorge Galván‡	Por Si No Te Vuelvo a Ver	
1998 (40th)	Martín Altomaro	Libre de Culpas	
1998 (40th)	Claudio Obregón	De Noche Vienes, Esmeralda	
1999 (41st)	Damián Alcázar‡	Bajo California, el Limite del Tiempo	
1999 (41st)	Daniel Acuña	Un Embrujo	
1999 (41st)	Roberto Sosa	Fibra Óptica	
2000 (42nd)	Damián Alcázar‡	La Ley de Herodes	
2000 (42nd)	Demián Bichir	Sexo, Pudor y Lágrimas	
2000 (42nd)	Guillermo Larrea	Rito Terminal	
2001 (43rd)	Gael García Bernal‡	Amores Perros	
2001 (43rd)	Bruno Bichir	Crónica de un Desayuno	
2001 (43rd)	Alejandro Parodi	Su Alteza Serenísima	
2002 (44th)	Arturo Ríos‡	Cuento de Hadas Para Dormir Cocodrilos	
2002 (44th)	Luis Fernando Peña	De la Calle	
2002 (44th)	Jorge Zárate	Pachito Rex, Me Voy Pero No del Todo	
2003 (45th)	Daniel Giménez Cacho‡	Aro Tolbukhin: En la Mente del Asesino	
2003 (45th)	Alberto Estrella	eXXXorcismos	
2003 (45th)	Luis Fernando Peña	Amar te duele	
2004 (46th)	Rafael Inclán‡	Nicotina	
2004 (46th)	Alejandro Ferretis	Japón	
2004 (46th)	Eduardo Palomo	El Misterio del Trinidad	
2005 (47th)	Enrique Arreola‡	Temporada de Patos	
2005 (47th)	Alejandro Calva	Manos Libres (Nadie te Habla)	
2005 (47th)	Silverio Palacios	Cero y Van Cuatro	
2006 (48th)	Damián Alcázar‡	Las Vueltas del Citrillo	
2006 (48th)	David Aarón Estrada	Noticias Lejanas	
2006 (48th)	Dagoberto Gama	Mezcal	
2007 (49th)	Damián Alcázar‡	Crónicas	
2007 (49th)	Armando Hernández	Fuera del Cielo	
2007 (49th)	Gabino Rodríguez	La Niña en la Piedra	
2008 (50th)	Jorge Zárate‡	Dos Abrazos	
2008 (50th)	Enrique Arreola	Párpados Azules	
2008 (50th)	Alan Chávez	Partes Usadas	
2008 (50th)	Lázaro Ramos	Cobrador: In God We Trust	
2009 (51st)	Mario Zaragoza‡	Desierto Adentro	
2009 (51st)	Juan Pablo de Santiago	I'm Gonna Explode	
2009 (51st)	Diego Luna	Rudo y Cursi	
2010 (52nd)	Fernando Luján‡	Cinco Días Sin Nora	
2010 (52nd)	Silverio Palacios	Conozca la Cabeza de Juan Pérez	
2010 (52nd)	Harold Torres	Norteado	
2011 (53rd)	Damián Alcázar‡	El Infierno	
2011 (53rd)	Javier Bardem	Biutiful	
2011 (53rd)	Demián Bichir	Hidalgo: La Historia Jamás Contada	
2011 (53rd)	Hansel Ramírez	La Mitad del Mundo	
2012 (54th)	Tenoch Huerta‡	Días de Gracia	
2012 (54th)	Joaquín Cosío	Pastorela	
2012 (54th)	Noé Hernández	Miss Bala	
2013 (55th)	Roberto Sosa‡	El Fantástico Mundo de Juan Orol	
2013 (55th)	Francisco Cruz	Entre la Noche y el Día	
2013 (55th)	Hernán Mendoza	Despues de Lucía	
2013 (55th)	Carlos Vallarino	La Demora	
2014 (56th)	Brandon López‡	La Jaula de Oro	
2014 (56th)	Armando Espitia	Heli	
2014 (56th)	Luis Gerardo Méndez	Nosotros Los Nobles	
2014 (56th)	Jesús Padilla	Workers	
2014 (56th)	Harold Torres	La cebra	
2015 (57th)	Juan Manuel Bernal‡	Obediencia Perfecta	
2015 (57th)	Kristyan Ferrer	Guten Tag, Ramón	
2015 (57th)	Tenoch Huerta	Güeros	
2015 (57th)	Óscar Jaenada	Cantinflas	
2015 (57th)	Harold Torres	González	
2016 (58th)	Marco Pérez‡	Gloria	
2016 (58th)	Damián Alcázar	La Delgada Línea Amarilla	
2016 (58th)	Kristyan Ferrer	600 Millas	
2016 (58th)	Tenoch Huerta	Mexican Gangster: La Leyenda del Charro Misterioso	
2016 (58th)	Tim Roth	600 Millas	
2017 (59th)	Adrián Ladrón‡	La 4ª Compañía	
2017 (59th)	José Carlos Ruiz‡	Almacenados	
2017 (59th)	Gael García Bernal	Me Estás Matando Susana	
2017 (59th)	Danny Glover	Mr. Pig	
2017 (59th)	Noé Hernández	Tenemos la Carne	
2018 (60th)	Eligio Meléndez‡	Sueño en Otro Idioma	
2018 (60th)	Leonardo Alonso	El Vigilante	
2018 (60th)	Humberto Busto	Oso Polar	
2018 (60th)	Daniel Giménez Cacho	Los Adioses	
2018 (60th)	Gabino Rodríguez	Los Crímenes de Mar del Norte	
2019 (61st)	Noé Hernández‡	Ocho de Cada Diez	
2019 (61st)	Damián Alcázar	De la Infancia	
2019 (61st)	Baltimore Beltrán	Mente Revólver	
2019 (61st)	Gael García Bernal	Museo	
2019 (61st)	Luis Gerardo Méndez	Bayoneta	
2020 (62nd)	Luis Alberti‡	Workforce (Mano de obra)	
2020 (62nd)	Benny Emmanuel	Chicuarotes	
2020 (62nd)	Armando Hernández	La Paloma y el Lobo	
2020 (62nd)	Xabiani Ponce de León	Esto no es Berlín	
2020 (62nd)	José María Yazpik	Polvo	
2021 (63rd)	Alfonso Herrera‡	El baile de los 41	
2021 (63rd)	Armando Espitia	Te Llevo Conmigo	
2021 (63rd)	Demián Bichir	Danyka	
2021 (63rd)	Fernando Cuautle	Nuevo Orden	
2021 (63rd)	Juan Pablo Medina	El club de los idealistas	
2021 (63rd)	Gabino Rodríguez	Fauna	
2022 (64th)	Raúl Briones‡	Una Película de Policías	
2022 (64th)	Alejandro Suárez	El Diablo Entre las Piernas	
2022 (64th)	Benny Emmanuel	Cosas Imposibles	
2022 (64th)	Leonardo Ortizgris	Los Minutos Negros	
2022 (64th)	Noé Hernández	Nudo Mixteco	
2023 (65th)	Daniel Giménez Cacho‡	Bardo, falsa crónica de unas cuantas verdades	
2023 (65th)	Álvaro Guerrero	La civil	
2023 (65th)	Cuauhtlí Jiménez	Finlandia	
2023 (65th)	Hernán Mendoza	La caja	
2023 (65th)	Gerardo Trejoluna	El Norte Sobre el Vacío	
2024 (66th)	Noé Hernández‡	Kokoloko	
2024 (66th)	Pedro de Tavira	Recursos humanos	
2024 (66th)	Daniel Giménez Cacho	Familia	
2024 (66th)	Juan Daniel García Treviño	Perdidos en la Noche	
2024 (66th)	Harold Torres	Desparecer por completo	
2025 (67th)	Raúl Briones‡	La Cocina	
2025 (67th)	Alfonso Dosal	Un Actor Malo	
2025 (67th)	Manuel García Rulfo	Pedro Páramo	
2025 (67th)	Juan Ramón López	Vergüenza	
2025 (67th)	Juan Jesús Varela	Sujo	
2026 (68th)	Osvaldo Sánchez‡	En El Camino	
2026 (68th)	Andrés Catzín	Cosmos	
2026 (68th)	Mauricio Isaac	Café Chairel	
2026 (68th)	Hoze Meléndez	Cocodrilos	
2026 (68th)	Ernesto Rocha	Adiós, amor	

== Multiple wins and nominations ==
The following individuals have received multiple Best Actor awards:

Wins	Actor
5	Damián Alcázar
3	Arturo de Córdova
3	Daniel Giménez Cacho
3	José Carlos Ruiz
2	Pedro Armendáriz
2	Héctor Bonilla
2	Raúl Briones
2	Alonso Echánove
2	Ernesto Gómez Cruz
2	Noé Hernández

The following actors received four or more Best Actor nominations:

Nominations	Actor
8	Damián Alcázar
7	Arturo de Córdova
7	Pedro Infante
6	Pedro Armendáriz
5	Demián Bichir
5	Héctor Bonilla
5	Daniel Giménez Cacho
5	Noé Hernández
4	José Alonso
4	Bruno Bichir
4	Alonso Echánove
4	Manuel Ojeda
4	Roberto Sosa
4	Harold Torres

== See also ==
- Academy Award for Best Actor
- Best Actor Award (Cannes Film Festival)
