= 2018 FotoFilm Tijuana =

- Opening film: Ayer Maravilla Fui
- Closing film: Cría Puercos
- Location: Tijuana, Baja California, Mexico
- Founded: 2017
- No. of films: 14
- Festival date: 27–31 July 2018
- Website: www.fftj.mx

The 2nd FotoFilm Tijuana Festival took place from 27 to 31 July 2018, in Tijuana, Baja California, Mexico. The official selection included 14 feature films, including the Ariel Award winner for Best Picture Sueño en Otro Idioma; 12 short films produced by the Mexican Institute of Cinematography (IMCINE) and two produced by the Centro de Capacitación Cinematográfica (CCC); and for the competition section, six short films were the candidates for the "Best of Show" award, sent to the festival through an open call for filmmakers posted on the FilmFreeway website; Emma or the Incoveniences of a Suicide by Mexican director Marlon Morales won the award.

== Official selection ==
=== Feature films ===
English title	Original title	Director(s)	Production country
Avenida Bugambilia		Paulina Casmur	Mexico, New Zealand, United States
Yesterday Wonder I Was	Ayer Maravilla Fui	Gabriel Mariño	Mexico
Help Me Make It Through the Night	Ayúdame a Pasar la Noche	José Ramón Chávez Delgado	Mexico
Esmeralda's Twilight	Cría Puercos	Ehécatl Garage	Mexico
The Night Guard	El Vigilante	Diego Ros	Mexico
No Dress Code Required	Etiqueta No Rigurosa	Cristina Herrera Bórquez	Mexico
Juan y Vanesa		Ianis Guerrero	Mexico
The Eternal Feminine	Los Adioses	Natalia Beristáin	Mexico
The Blue Years	Los Años Azules	Sofía Gómez Córdova	Mexico
Revolver Mind	Mente Revolver	Alejandro Ramírez Corona	Mexico
Barbarous Mexico 2	México Bárbaro II	Abraham Sánchez, Carlos Meléndez, Christian Cueva, Diego Cohen, Fernando Urdapilleta, Lex Ortega, Michelle Garza, Ricardo Farías, and Sergio Tello	Mexico
Drown Among the Dead	Piérdete Entre los Muertos	Rubén Gutiérrez	Mexico
I Dream in Another Language	Sueño en Otro Idioma	Ernesto Contreras	Mexico, Netherlands
Todos Los Viernes Son Santos		Héctor Villanueva	Mexico

=== Short films ===
==== Desde Mexico ====
Also included as a part of the official selection of the festival was a section entitled "Desde Mexico", which included 10 short films produced by the Mexican Institute of Cinematography (IMCINE) and two produced by the Centro de Capacitación Cinematográfica (CCC). Both, Oasis, directed by Alejandro Zuno, and Cerulia, directed by Sofía Carrillo, won the Ariel Award in 2018.

English title	Original title	Director(s)	Production country
Poliangular		Alexandra Castellanos	Mexico
Cerulia		Sofía Carrillo	Mexico
Last Station	Última Estación	Héctor Dávila	Mexico
The Garden of Delights	El Jardín de las Delicias	Alejandro Gracía	Mexico
The Aeronauts	Los Aeronautas	León Fernández	Mexico
Elena and the Shadows	Elena y las Sombras	César Cepeda	Mexico
Oasis		Alejandro Zuno	Mexico
The Problem of Being a Binary Star	El Problema de las Estrellas Binarias	Juan H. Villar	Mexico
White Dust	Polvo Blanco	Silverio Palacio	Mexico
Rock Hours	Horas Roca	Sandra Reynoso	Mexico
The Last Romantic	El Último Romántico	Natalia García Agraz	Mexico
Golden Malibu		Natalia Bermúdez	Mexico

==== Jukebox Visual ====
The competition for the "Best of Show" award, was divided into animated, documentary, fiction and music video fields, and as an incentive for filmmakers from the Mexican states of Baja California, Baja California Sur, Chihuahua, Durango, Sinaloa, and Sonora a section entitled "Desde el Norte" ("From the North") was created. Six finalists were selected from all entries through the website Film Freeway. The Best of Show included a prize, equivalent to USD1,000, and was awarded to Emma or the Incoveniences of a Suicide by Mexican director Marlon Morales.

English title	Original title	Director(s)	Production country
The Dizygotic Twins	Les jumeaux dizygotes	Cassandre Émanuel	Canada
Enzo		Serena Porcher-Carli	France
Blue Tomorrow		Numan Ayaz	Turkey
Dreamt Little Eyes	Ojitos Soñados	Jossué Glezmed	Mexico
Gang de rang	Road Gang	Cassandre Émanuel	Canada
Emma or the Incoveniences of a Suicide	Emma (o las inconveniencias de un suicidio)	Marlon Morales	Mexico
