= Daniel Giménez Cacho =

Spanish and Mexican actor (born 1961)

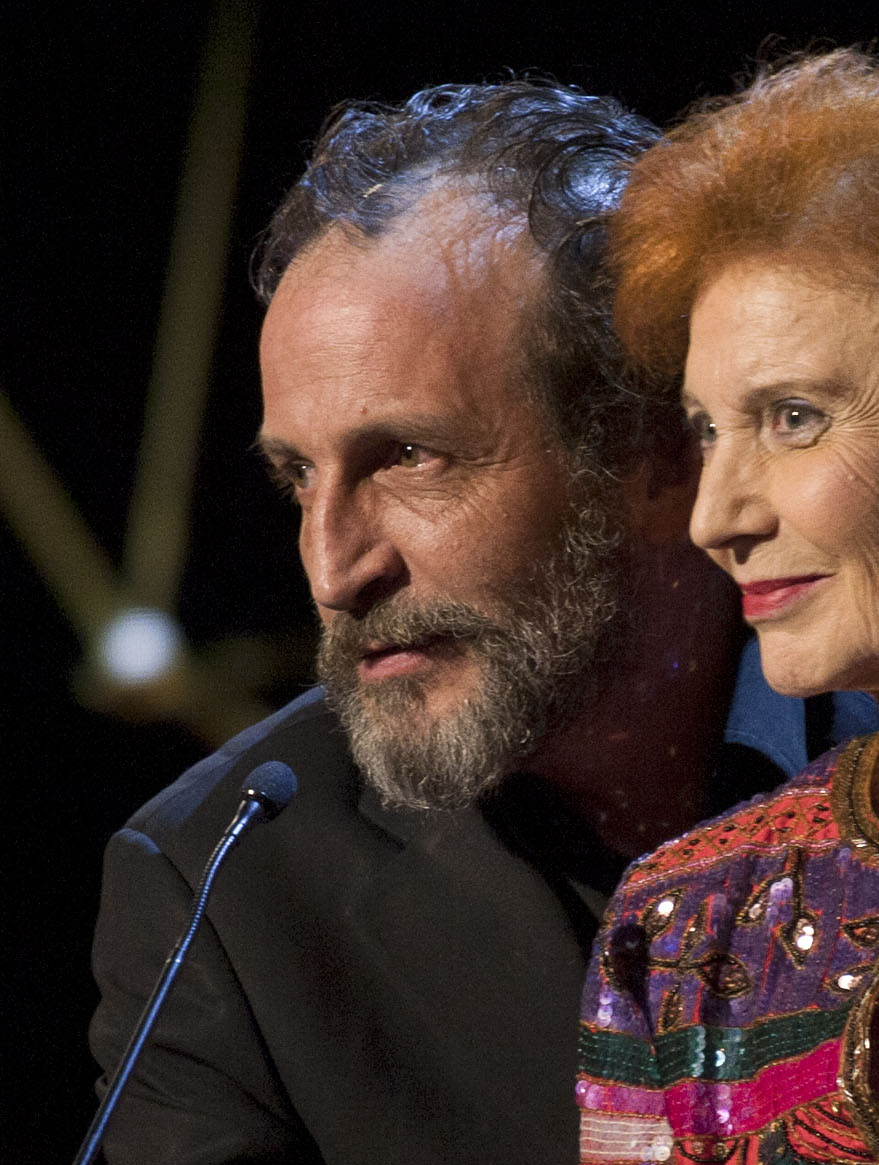
- Giménez Cacho in October 2014
- Born: Daniel Giménez Cacho García; May 15, 1961 (age 65); Madrid, Spain
- Citizenship: Spain; Mexico
- Occupations: Actor, director, writer, producer, TV host
- Years active: 1986–present
- Spouse: Maya Goded
- Children: 2

Daniel Giménez Cacho García (born May 15, 1961) is a Spanish and Mexican actor. Giménez Cacho made his film debut in Camino largo a Tijuana (1989). Early in his career, he portrayed Tito the Coroner in both Cronos (1993) and We Are What We Are (2010). He has also starred in Lucrecia Martel's period slow cinema film Zama (2017), Apichatpong Weerasethakul's slow cinema film Memoria (2021), and Alejandro González Iñárritu's epic psychological comedy-drama film Bardo, False Chronicle of a Handful of Truths (2022).

== Early life ==
Daniel Giménez Cacho was born on May 15, 1961 in Madrid, as the youngest of the six children of Luis Giménez Cacho and Julia García Casado, two actors who performed in the theatre company La Barraca. In Mexico, his mother also became a noted painter as a disciple of Elvira Gascón. He moved to Mexico as a child and studied theatre at the National Autonomous University of Mexico (UNAM).

== Career ==
He starred in several Mexican films and television series, such as Sólo Con Tu Pareja, Cronos, Midaq Alley, Tear This Heart Out and Bad Education. He has worked with several prominent Spanish-language filmmakers, including Guillermo del Toro, Alfonso Cuarón, Jorge Fons and Pedro Almodóvar. He appeared in La hora marcada, the series written and directed by Alfonso Cuarón and Guillermo del Toro, and in the Mexican telenovela Teresa. His voice is heard throughout Y tu mamá también as the narrator. In 2009, he starred in the Mexican remake for the Argentinian series Locas de Amor. Cacho played the Armenian priest in The Promise, a film set in the Armenian genocide.

== Filmography ==
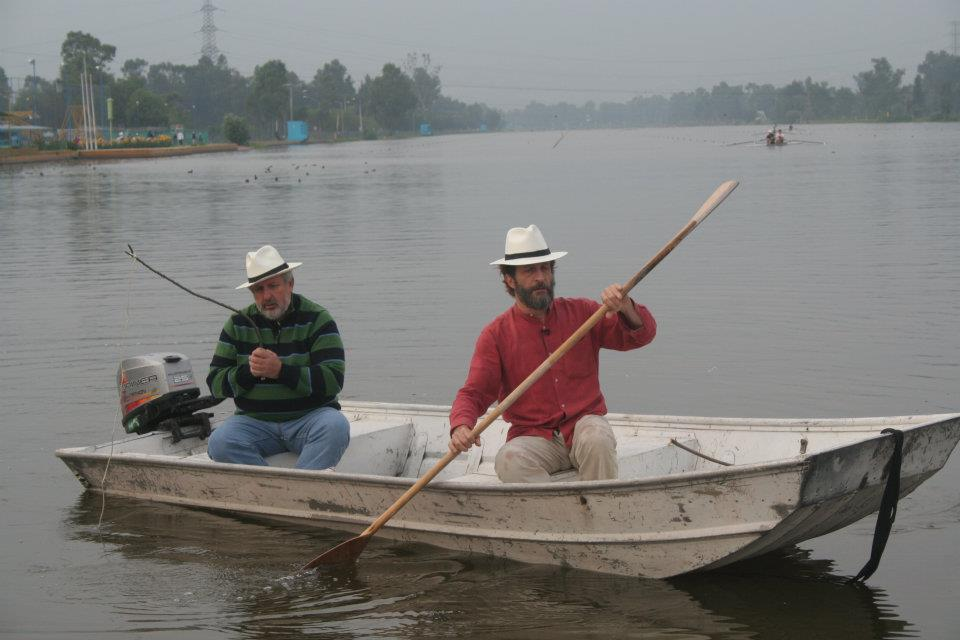
Gimenez Cacho filming in Cuemanco

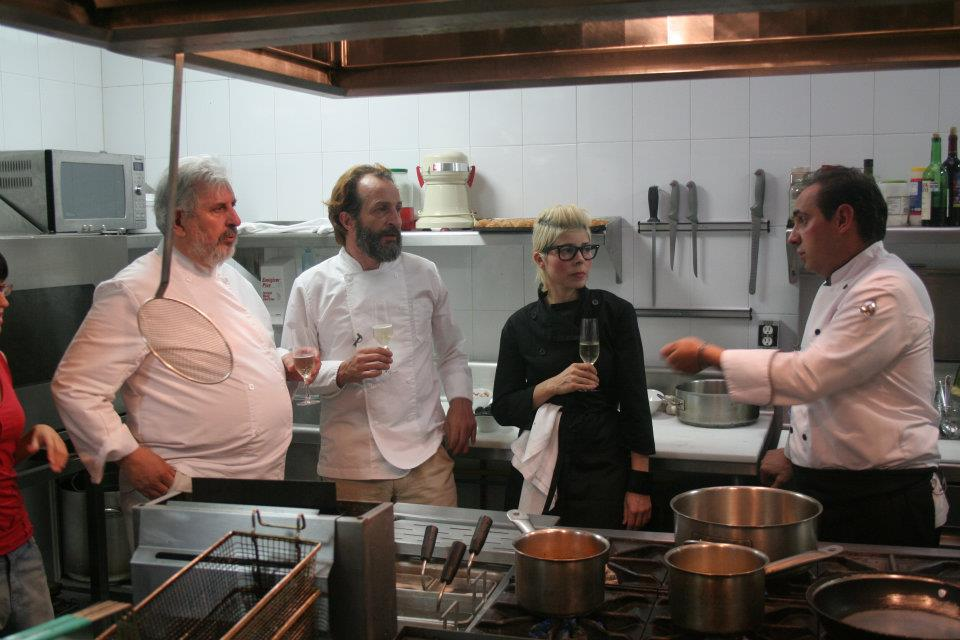
Gimenez Cacho in the kitchen

- Camino largo a Tijuana (1988)
- Bandidos (1991)
- Solo con tu pareja (1991)
- Cabeza de Vaca (1991)
- Cronos (1993)
- Midaq Alley (1995)
- Nadie hablará de nosotras cuando hayamos muerto (1995)
- Profundo Carmesí (1996)
- Celos (Jealousy) (1999)
- El Coronel no tiene quien le escriba (No One Writes to the Colonel) (1999)
- Y tu mamá también (narrator) (2001)
- Sin vergüenza (2001)
- Asesino en serio (2002)
- Aro Tolbukhin. En la mente del asesino (2002)
- No somos nadie (2002)
- Nicotina (2003)
- La mala educación (Bad Education) (2004)
- Perder es cuestión de método (2004)
- Voces inocentes (2004)
- Las vidas de Celia (2006)
- La zona (2007)
- Arráncame la vida (2008)
- I'm Gonna Explode (2008)
- El Infierno (2010)
- We Are What We Are (Somos Lo Que Hay) (2010)
- Get the Gringo (2012)
- Colosio: El asesinato (2012)
- Blancanieves (2012)
- El Santos vs. La Tetona Mendoza (2012)
- El Jeremías (2015)
- A Monster with a Thousand Heads (2015)
- Club de Cuervos (2015-)
- You're Killing Me Susana (2016)
- The Promise (2016)
- The Summit (2017)
- Zama (2017)
- The Eternal Feminine (2017)
- Chicuarotes (2019)
- Devil Between the Legs (2019)
- Memoria (2021)
- Bardo, False Chronicle of a Handful of Truths (2022)
- Familia (2023)
- Kill the Jockey (2024)

== Awards and nominations ==
Year	Award	Category	Work	Result	Ref.
1993	35th Ariel Awards	Best Actor in a Minor Role	Cronos	Won	
1995	37th Ariel Awards	Best Supporting Actor	El callejón de los milagros	Nominated	
1997	39th Ariel Awards	Best Actor	Deep Crimson	Won	
2003	45th Ariel Awards	Best Actor	Aro Tolbukhin: In the Mind of a Killer	Won	
2004	46th Ariel Awards	Best Supporting Actor	Nicotina	Won	
2013	68th CEC Medals	Best Actor	Snow White	Nominated	
2013	27th Goya Awards	Best Actor	Snow White	Nominated	
2013	55th Ariel Awards	Best Supporting Actor	Colosio, el asesinato	Won	
2013	22nd Actors and Actresses Union Awards	Best Film Actor in a Leading Role	Snow White	Nominated	
2018	60th Ariel Awards	Best Actor	Los adioses	Nominated	
2018	12th Sur Awards	Best Actor	Zama	Won	
2020	62nd Ariel Awards	Best Supporting Actor	Chicuarotes	Nominated	
2022	64th Ariel Awards	Best Supporting Actor	El diablo entre las piernas	Nominated	
2023	65th Ariel Awards	Best Actor	Bardo, False Chronicle of a Handful of Truths	Won	
2024	66th Ariel Awards	Best Actor	Familia	Nominated	

== Political views ==
In October 2023, he joined the open letter called "Artists Against Apartheid" during the concurrent escalation of violence in Palestine.
