= Plaza de la Soledad =

Theatrical release poster

Plaza de la Soledad is a 2016 Mexican documentary film directed by Maya Goded. The film follows of a group of five older women in their lives as sex workers in Mexico City, focusing on their personal histories, relationships, and experiences with aging, sexuality, and gender violence.

== Plot ==
Maya Goded's Plaza de Soledad is a documentary told in a vignette storytelling style, focusing on episodes of sex workers in Mexico City's "Plaza de la Soledad" square. There are five key women featured, all falling between the ages of 50 and 80. Carmen, one of the older women, is a caretaker-type figure, who supports the others; namely Lupe, a single mother. Another woman, Leticia, uses the money she earns to pay for her daughter's cancer treatment. Esther and Ángeles, two others, have been in a relationship for fourteen years, and finally, Raquel, the oldest woman, follows a plot of emotional development and romantic yearning. All five endure struggles throughout their lives, and these moments are shown throughout the documentary, tempered by tight familial bonds and a sense of humor used to cope.

== Cast ==
The main cast included five sex workers with their real identities:

- Carmen Muñoz as Herself
- Leticia "Lety" Guzmán as Herself
- Epifanía "Esther" Ruiz Lucas as Herself
- Ángeles Álvarez Llorente as Herself
- Raquel López as Herself
- Carlos Pérez Ramírez as Himself

== Reception ==
The film received widely favorable reviews from critics. The films critic aggregate Rotten Tomatoes reported 100% of critics gave the film a positive review based on 5 reviews, while IMDb gave the film a 7.5/10, based on 169 reviews.

After its debut at Sundance Film Festival, the consensus amongst critics was that the film handled heavy subjects with an intimate level of honesty, allowing the women to tell their stories in full capacity. Wendy Ide, a critic from ScreenDaily, wrote that "Goded lets the prostitutes have voices and hopes for the future, things which are routinely denied them by a culture which punishes women for victimhood." The film's shooting style focuses on the intimacy of the setting: the women's bodies, though aged, are shown fully, and the details of their homes and surroundings are shown in a stripped back manner. Goded's background in photography influenced the film’s aesthetic style to create a sense of intimacy.

"They’re older women, and I love to see how they feel about their bodies. The women who dedicate themselves to prostitution are very confident in their bodies and accept their age," Goded spoke.

To achieve this, Goded noted in an interview with Remezcla that it helped that she had known the subjects for over 20 years before she had started to film them, allowing them to be their most comfortable and authentic selves in the film.

The film was nominated for several honors, including at the 60th Ariel Awards in 2018, which recognizes excellence in Mexican cinema.
