= Rosario Castellanos =

Mexican poet and author (1925–1974)

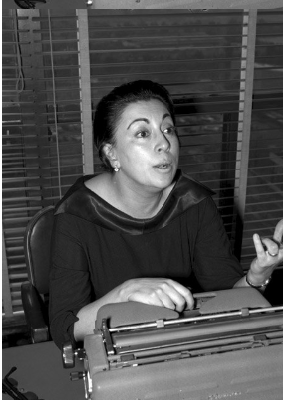
- Castellanos, c. 1965
- Born: 25 May 1925; Mexico City, Mexico
- Died: 7 August 1974 (aged 49); Tel Aviv, Israel
- Education: National Autonomous University of Mexico (Philosophy and Letters)
- Occupations: Poet, novelist, cultural promoter and diplomat
- Spouse: Ricardo Guerra Tejada
- Writing career
- Language: Spanish
- Notable awards: Xavier Villaurrutia Award (1960)
- Movement: Generation of '50

Rosario Castellanos Figueroa (Spanish pronunciation: [roˈsaɾjo kasteˈʝanos]; 25 May 1925 – 7 August 1974) was a Mexican poet and author. She wrote both fiction, often set in her home state of Chiapas, and nonfiction addressing issues of cultural and gender oppression. Her writing influenced Mexican feminist theory and cultural studies. Castellanos was appointed ambassador to Israel in 1971. She died by electrocution in Tel Aviv while reaching for a lamp.

== Career ==
Born in Mexico City, Castellanos was raised in Comitán near her family's ranch in the southern state of Chiapas. She was an introverted young girl, who took notice of the plight of the indigenous Maya who worked for her family. According to her own account, she felt estranged from her family after a soothsayer predicted that one of her mother's two children would die shortly, and her mother screamed out, "Not the boy!"

The family's fortunes changed suddenly when President Lázaro Cárdenas enacted a land reform and peasant emancipation policy that stripped the family of much of its land holdings. At fifteen, Castellanos and her parents moved to Mexico City. In 1948 both of her parents died in an accident, leaving her orphaned at 23 years of age.

Although she remained introverted, Castellanos read extensively and began to write. She studied philosophy and literature at the National Autonomous University of Mexico (UNAM), where she published poetry in the student newspaper. She was part of a group of intellectuals called the Generation of '50 for the year its members completed their studies. The group met regularly on Saturdays to discuss their literary work and Castellanos defended her master's thesis, Sobre cultura femenina (On Feminine Culture), in 1950. It rejected gender essentialism and addressed women's marginalization three years before Mexican women were granted the right to vote.

After graduating UNAM, Castellanos began a year of postgraduate study in aesthetics and stylistics in Madrid. In 1952, she was directing cultural programs in Tuxtla Gutiérrez when she contracted tuberculosis. She spent a year recovering. A Rockefeller Foundation fellowship supported the development of her first novel, Balún Canán, in 1957. She subsequently joined the National Indigenist Institute (INI) in 1956 as director of El Teatro Petul, a traveling puppet theater. In this role she wrote scripts to teach literacy, hygiene, and civic conduct to Indigenous communities. She would later recall that script writing was not her forte, though the experience informed her writing of The Eternal Feminine in 1970.

Castellanos married Ricardo Guerra Tejada, a professor of philosophy, in 1958. The birth in 1961 of their son Gabriel Guerra Castellanos was an important moment in Castellanos' life; prior to his birth, she suffered from depression after several miscarriages. However, she and Guerra divorced after thirteen years of marriage, Guerra having been unfaithful to Castellanos. Her personal life was marked by her difficult marriage and continuous depression, but she dedicated a large part of her work and energy to defending women's rights.

Castellanos established herself as a public intellectual in the 1960s. She served as press and information director for UNAM from 1960-66 and wrote columns in publications like Siempre! and Excélsior. She resigned in April 1966 after a colleague was taken hostage during a period of political unrest. She spent the next year in the United States, teaching at the Universities of Wisconsin, Indiana, and Colorado, where she taught courses on the Mexican novel. Her stay coincided with the height of the U.S. women's liberation movement, and her observations of independent demonstrations influenced her own thinking. On returning to Mexico, she held a Chair of Comparative Literature at UNAM before being appointed the Mexican Ambassador to Israel in 1971. In Tel Aviv, she found fulfillment while holding a lectureship at the Hebrew University of Jerusalem.

== Death ==
On 7 August 1974, Castellanos died in Tel Aviv after being electrocuted by a lamp while answering the telephone. She had suffered from depression and drug addiction in life, leading to questions about the circumstances of her death. Her fellow writer, Elena Poniatowska, called it "highly unlikely" that Castellanos could have died by suicide in the way she did.

== Work and influences ==
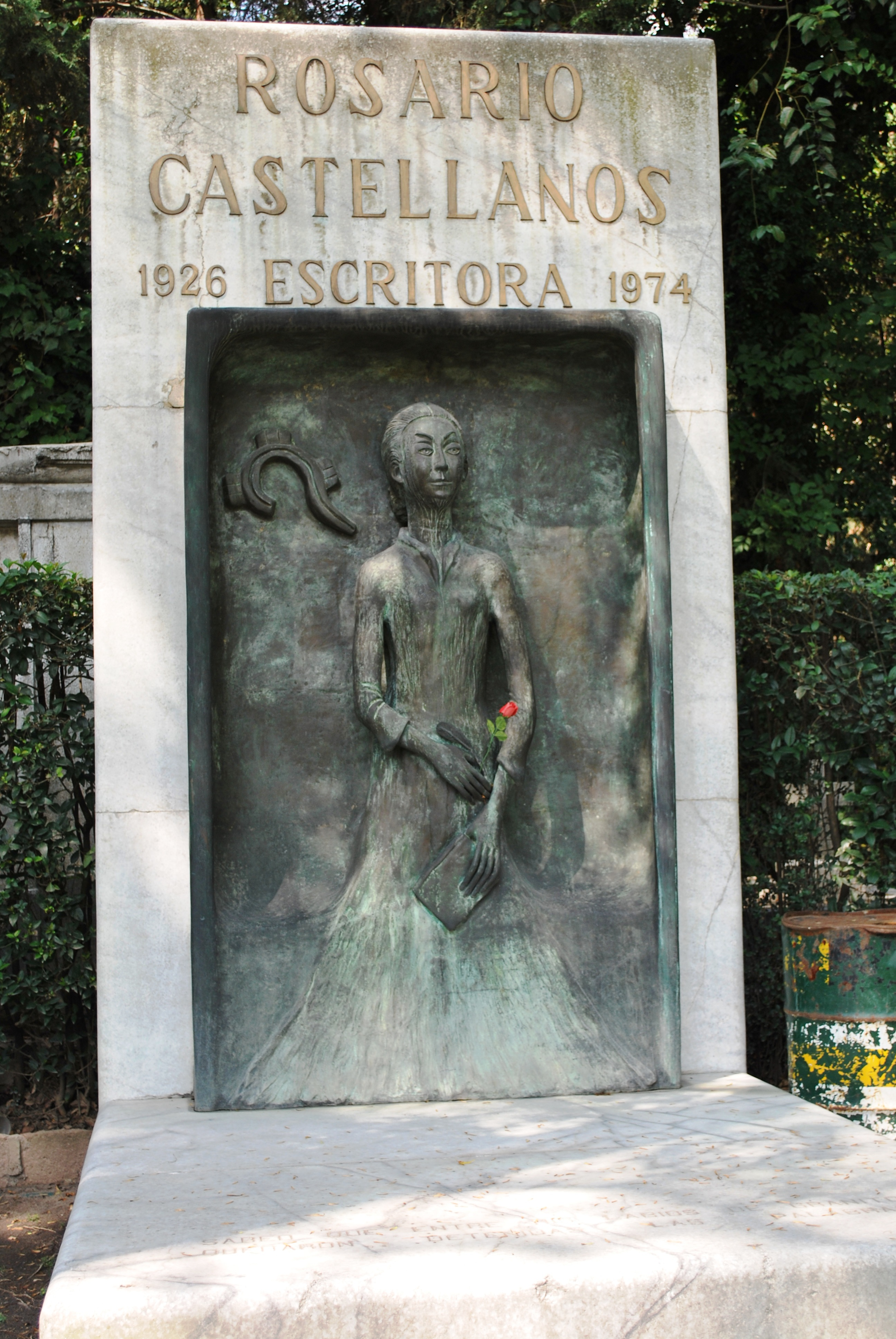
Tombstone of Rosario Castellanos

Throughout her career, Castellanos wrote poetry, essays, one major play, and three novels: the semi-autobiographical Balún Canán (translated into English as The Nine Guardians), Oficio de tinieblas (translated into English as The Book of Lamentations), and Rito de iniciación. Oficio de tinieblas depicts a Tzotzil indigenous uprising in Chiapas, based on one that had occurred in the 19th century. Rito de iniciación is a bildungsroman about a young woman who discovers her vocation of a writer. Despite being a ladino – not indigenous descent – Castellanos in her works shows considerable concern and understanding for the plight of indigenous peoples.

A central theme in Castellanos' fiction, poetry and essays is her advocacy of women's rights; she is a pioneering feminist thinker in Mexico. Her first important feminist essay was her 1950 Master's thesis titled Sobre cultura feminina (On Feminine Culture) in which she traces the social role of women throughout history. In her 1973 collection of essays Mujer que sabe latin (The Woman Who Knows Latin) she explores various aspects of women's place in society and expectations placed on them as well as paths forward, especially in the central essay "La mujer y su imagen" ("Woman and Her Image"). In her posthumous work of theater El eterno femenino (The Eternal Feminine, 1975) Castellanos explores women's various social roles throughout history by having famous women in Mexican history dialogue among themselves, including, the poet Sor Juana Inés de la Cruz, the heroine of independence Josefa Ortíz de Domínguez and the Austrian Empress Charlotte, wife of Emperor Ferdinand Maximilian (during the French occupation from 1864 to 1867).

"Cartas a Ricardo," a collection of Castellanos' letters to her husband, Ricardo Guerra, was published after her death, as was her third novel, Rito de iniciación. In "Cartas a Ricardo" there are some 28 letters Castellanos wrote from Spain (1950–51) where she travelled with her friend, the poet Dolores Castro.

Ciudad Real is a collection of short stories published in 1960. Castellanos' main focus in these short stories are the differences between distinct groups, namely, the whites and the indigenous people, but she also addresses the differences between men and women. Communication is an important theme in Castellanos' work, and Ciudad Real shows the tension between the native people of Chiapas, Mexico and the whites, who cannot communicate with each other and subsequently mistrust each other because they do not speak the same language. These are recurring themes in this collection, along with themes of lonely and marginalized people. However, the last story of the novel is somewhat different than the rest. In this story the main character, named Arthur, knows both Spanish and the indigenous language and is therefore able to break down the barriers that stand between the two different groups throughout the novel. At the end, Arthur makes a connection with nature (something that is rare in Castellanos' work) and finds peace with himself and with the world. It is the only story within the novel with a "happy ending".

Castellanos admired writers such as Gabriela Mistral, Emily Dickinson, Simone de Beauvoir, Virginia Woolf, and Simone Weil. Castellanos' poem, "Valium 10," is in the confessional mode, and is a great feminist poem comparable to Sylvia Plath's "Daddy."

== Awards and honors ==
In 1958, she received the Chiapas Award, for Balún Canán, and two years after the Xavier Villaurrutia Award, for Ciudad Real. Among other subsequent awards, the Sor Juana Inés de la Cruz Award (1962), the Carlos Trouyet Award of Letters (1967), and the Elías Sourasky Award of Letters (1972).

== Legacy ==
Several public places bear Castellanos' name

- A park and a public library are named after her in the Mexico City borough of Cuajimalpa.
- The library of the Center for Research and Gender Studies, of the UNAM.
- One of the gardens of the Faculty of Philosophy and Letters, of the UNAM.
- The headquarters of the Economic Culture Fund in Colonia Condesa, Mexico City, bears her name.

Natalia Beristáin directed a biopic about Castellanos, released as The Eternal Feminine in 2017. The film explores the author's relationship with Ricardo Guerra Tejada and focuses on the final years of her writing career. It won the audience prize at the Morelia International Film Festival.

== Selected bibliography ==
- Balún-Canán Fondo de Cultura Economica, 1957; 2007, ISBN 978-968-16-8303-0
- Poemas (1953–1955), Colección Metáfora, 1957
- Ciudad Real: Cuentos, 1960; Penguin Random House Grupo Editorial México, 2007, ISBN 978-607-11-0865-4
- Oficio de tinieblas 1962; 2013, Grupo Planeta – México, ISBN 978-607-07-1659-1
- Álbum de familia (1971)
- Poesía no eres tú; Obra poética: 1948–1971 1972; Fondo de Cultura Economica, 2004, ISBN 978-968-16-7117-4
- Mujer que sabe latín . . . 1973; Fondo de Cultura Economica, 2003, ISBN 978-968-16-7116-7
- El eterno femenino: Farsa 1973; Fondo de Cultura Economica, 2012, ISBN 978-607-16-1082-9
- Bella dama sin piedad y otros poemas, Fondo de Cultura Económica, 1984, ISBN 978-968-16-1733-2
- Los convidados de agosto. Ediciones Era. 1964. ISBN 978-968-411-203-2.
- Declaración de fe Penguin Random House Grupo Editorial México, 2012, ISBN 978-607-11-1933-9
- La muerte del tigre SEP, 198?
- Cartas a Ricardo (1994)
- Rito de iniciación 1996; 2012, Penguin Random House Grupo Editorial México, ISBN 978-607-11-1935-3
- Sobre cultura femenina. Fondo de Cultura Económica. 2005. ISBN 978-968-16-7465-6.

== English translations ==
- The Nine Guardians: a Novel, Translator Irene Nicholson, Readers International, 1992, ISBN 978-0-930523-90-9
- The Book of Lamentations. Translated by Esther Allen. Penguin Books. 1998. ISBN 978-0-14-118003-8. (Oficio de tinieblas)
- A Rosario Castellanos Reader: An Anthology of Her Poetry, Short Fiction, Essays and Drama. Maureen Ahern. University of Texas Press. 28 June 2010. ISBN 978-0-292-78989-0. From this volume, the short story Cooking Lesson was also included in the anthology Sun, Stone, and Shadows.
- City of Kings, Translated by Robert S. Rudder, Gloria Chacón de Arjona, Latin American Literary Review Press, 1993, ISBN 978-0-935480-63-4, OCLC 39164857
- The selected poems of Rosario Castellanos, translator Magda Bogin, Saint Paul, Minn.: Graywolf Press, 1988. OCLC 88081023

== Bibliography ==
- Anzzolin, Kevin M. (2019). "Dialectical Indigenism and Cognitive-Evaluative Compassion in Rosario Castellanos's Balún Canán". Confluencia: Revista Hispánica de Cultura y Literatura. 34 (2): 23–36. doi:10.1353/cnf.2019.0004.
- Castellanos, Rosario (2010). Ahern, Maureen (ed.). A Rosario Castellanos Reader. Austin, Texas: University of Texas Press. ISBN 978-0292789890.
- Gallo, Eric (Summer 2017). "The Political Becomes the Personal: Rosario Castellanos and the US Women's Liberation Movement". Hispanic Review. 85 (3): 295-313. doi:10.1353/hir.2017.0024.
