= Nicotina =

- Directed by: Hugo Rodríguez
- Written by: Martín Salinas
- Produced by: Laura Imperiale; Monica Lozano Serrano
- Starring: Diego Luna
- Cinematography: Marcelo Iaccarino
- Edited by: Alberto de Toro
- Music by: Fernando Corona
- Distributed by: Arenas Group
- Release date: 3 October 2003
- Running time: 93 minutes
- Countries: Mexico; Argentina
- Language: Spanish
- Budget: $446,768

Nicotina (English: Nicotine) is a six-time Ariel Award winning and six-time nominated 2003 Mexican-Argentine gangster film produced by the same team as the 2000 acclaimed film Amores perros. It is a "real time movie".

== Plot ==
Lolo is a male computer science geek who tangles with a clutch of the Russian mafia, when he delivers the wrong computer disk to them and with the disastrous results of drugs and smoking tobacco.

== Cast ==
- Diego Luna as Lolo
- Lucas Crespi as Nene
- Norman Sotolongo as Svóboda
- Jesús Ochoa as Tomson
- Martha Tenorio as Eulogia (as Marta Tenorio)
- Rafael Inclán as Goyo
- Rosa María Bianchi as Carmen
- José María Yazpik as Joaquín
- Marta Belaustegui as Andrea
- Eugenio Montessoro as Carlos
- Carmen Madrid as Clara
- Daniel Giménez Cacho as Beto
- Alexis Sánchez as Andrei
- Jorge Zárate as Sánchez
- Enoc Leaño as Memo

== Bibliography ==
- Arranging The Actors To Promote Nicotine Fits, The New York Times, A. O. Scott, 20 August 2004
- Nicotina - review, Plume-noire, Anji Milanovic, Access date: 31 May 2022
- Nicotina, Political Film Society, 3 January 2003
