= The Untamed (2016 film) =

2016 film

- Film poster
- Directed by: Amat Escalante
- Written by: Amat Escalante
- Produced by: Fernanda de la Peza; Amat Escalante; Jaime Romandia
- Starring: Simone Bucio; Ruth Ramos; Jesús Meza
- Cinematography: Manuel Alberto Claro
- Edited by: Fernanda De la Peza; Jacob Secher Schulsinger
- Music by: Martín Escalante; Lasse Marhaug; Guro Skumsnes Moe
- Release date: 15 May 2016
- Running time: 100 minutes
- Country: Mexico
- Language: Spanish

The Untamed (Spanish: La región salvaje) is a 2016 Mexican science fiction horror film written and directed by Amat Escalante. It was selected to compete for the Golden Lion at the 73rd Venice International Film Festival, with Escalante winning the Silver Lion for his direction.

== Plot ==
A young mother of two, Alejandra, is married to closeted homosexual Ángel, who is in a secret affair with Alejandra's brother, a nurse named Fabián. In public however, Ángel makes fun of Fabián and gay people in general. Alejandra is desperately unhappy in her marriage and extremely sexually frustrated. While in the shower, she masturbates and almost reaches an orgasm until her kids knock on the door, interrupting her.

Veronica is a young woman who is sexually infatuated with a tentacled alien creature originating from a crashed meteor that an elderly couple keep in a barn in the countryside. She has been visiting the alien for years, having sexual encounters where the creature brings her to orgasm. Having never injured her in the past, the creature suddenly bites her in the abdomen. At the hospital, she is cared for by Fabián, and becomes friends with him. When she tells the older couple she wants to continue visiting the alien, they forbid it, as it has become dangerous for her.

Ángel visits Fabián and angrily demands to know why Fabián has not answered his texts. Fabián informs him that their affair is over. Veronica entices Fabián to visit the barn, but later Fabián is found naked in a field, sexually assaulted and beaten into a coma. As he lies in the hospital, Alejandra finds his phone and reads the angry texts from Ángel, in which Ángel demands sex from him, threatening violence. Ángel is arrested at work, and Alejandra testifies against him, as does one of Fabián's co-workers, who witnessed their disputes.

Veronica brings Alejandra to the farm, where the couple tell her about how the alien arrived when something from the sky made a crater in a field near the farm. In the crater, animals of all sorts are wildly copulating. Alejandra is drugged by the couple and escorted into the barn, where the alien pleasures her. She continues to visit the barn, even sometimes bringing her kids along when she can't find anyone to watch them for her; they play outside while she has sex with the creature in the room. The elderly couple become increasingly concerned by the creature's capacity for violence. Veronica attempts to form a sexual relationship with a man, but he cannot satisfy her as the creature did.

Ángel's wealthy parents use their influence to have their son released from jail, posting bail by selling his house. They berate him for embarrassing them so badly, and insist he leave town and never return. Instead, he visits Alejandra in hopes of reuniting his family. She tells him that she now knows he didn't hurt Fabián, but he hits her when she says that they are done. When he tries to pull a gun on her, he accidentally shoots himself in the leg. Alejandra helps him into her truck, but drives into the countryside. She drags Ángel, who is semi-conscious, into the barn, where she finds Veronica dead. As Alejandra leaves, the creature lowers itself from the ceiling, towards Ángel.

Later, the older man and Alejandra dump the bodies of Veronica and Ángel into a pit, where Alejandra comments on how rapidly the dead bodies are piling up.

== Cast ==
- Ruth Ramos as Alejandra, Ángel's wife and Fabián's older sister
- Simone Bucio as Verónica
- Jesús Meza as Ángel, Alejandra's husband
- Eden Villavicencio as Fabián, a male nurse and Alejandra's young brother
- Andrea Peláez as Madre de Angel, Angel's mother
- Oscar Escalante as Sr. Vega
- Bernarda Trueba as Marta Vega
- Fernando Corona as Person in the market
- Kenny Johnston as Coleman

== Reception ==
=== Critical response ===
On review aggregator website Rotten Tomatoes, the film has an approval rating of 86% based on 73 reviews, with an average rating of 7.05/10. The site's critics' consensus reads: "The Untamed attempts some ambitious tonal juggling between fantastical and disturbing – and draws viewers in with its slippery, inexorable pull." On Metacritic, the film has an aggregated score of 72 out of 100 based on 19 critics, indicating "Generally favorable reviews".
