= Tamara and the Ladybug =

2016 film

- Film poster
- Directed by: Lucía Carreras
- Written by: Lucía Carreras
- Starring: Ángeles Cruz
- Release date: 9 September 2016 (TIFF)
- Running time: 107 minutes
- Country: Mexico
- Language: Spanish

Tamara and the Ladybug (Spanish: Tamara y la Catarina) is a 2016 Mexican drama film directed by Lucía Carreras. It was screened in the Contemporary World Cinema section at the 2016 Toronto International Film Festival.

== Cast ==
- Ángeles Cruz as Tamara
- Gustavo Sánchez Parra as Policía Huicho
- Angelina Peláez as Doña Meche
- Alberto Trujillo as Lalo
- Harold Torres as Paco
