= Jorge Alderete =

Argentine illustrator

- Born: 1971 (age 54–55); Santa Cruz, Argentina (Patagonia)
- Education: National University of La Plata
- Spouse: Clarissa Moura
- Website: jorgealderete.com

Jorge Alderete (born 1971), also known as Dr. Alderete, is an Argentine illustrator, animator, editor and owner of several businesses, best known for his comic book and kitsch aesthetic in his work. Most of Alderete’s career has evolved in Mexico, where he came in 1998 and with the exception of a year in Spain, has since stayed, living and worked from his apartment in Colonia Roma in Mexico City. Most of his work is related to Mexico City’s music scene, especially rock and surf bands, having created about eighty CD covers and various other promotional items including the billboards for the 2011 Vive Latino music festival. Alderete’s work has appeared in publications, including anthologies of graphic arts in Mexico, the United States and Europe and has also done animation work for MTV, Nickelodeon and Mexican television.

== Life ==
Jorge Alderete was born in the town of Santa Cruz, Argentina (Patagonia) in 1971. He is the eldest of three children to a middle-class family and was named after his father. His mother was a teacher, and his father a state employee. Although born in Santa Cruz, he grew up in a small city called Neuquén, in the province of the same name.

Aldrete received his first comic book/graphic novel before he was able to read and took to them immediately, reading them through his childhood in the 1970s and 1980s. This comic books were not of the superhero kind. In Argentina, they are closer to graphic novels, mostly written for older audiences, based on classic stories and others. This kind of graphic has more prestige in Argentina, with many locally produced and imported from other parts of the Americas and Europe. Popular authors included Alberto Breccia, Hugo Pratt and Corto Maltés. He not only read these books, they prompted a love for drawing, coping what he say, the only one of the three siblings to do this. His parents supported him, even sending Jorge to classes, but he found them boring and learning on his own. His interest in graphic novel creation was enough to be frustrated in his teens to be a 14-hour bus ride from Buenos Aires, where all the publishers were. Instead, Aldrete and some friends in Neuquén started their own fanzine called Alquitrán.

His interest in rock music began in the 1980s, but much of the music he was listening to was from the 1970s, punk and hard rock, which had not reached that part of the world until then. His taste in this music has developed towards surf music (1960s, Beach Boys) and instrumental rock. Later, he would integrate himself in Mexico City’s rock scene for both personal and business reasons soon after he arrived. He says he is a frustrated musician; instead, he collaborates with bands through his art.

He entered college in 1989, his first move away from his hometown. He went to the National University of La Plata in Buenos Aires to study design and visual communication. He worked in Argentina for a while but in 1998, he and wife Clarissa Moura, also a designer, decided to live abroad temporarily for the experience. Their two choices were Mexico and Spain, and initially they went to Mexico. In 2001, on Moura's suggestion, the couple went to Spain, where Aldrete was able to obtain work, but returned to Mexico the following year as they did not feel as welcome in Europe.

Aldrete has since lived permanently in Mexico, not returning to Argentina except for business and annual trips to his hometown. This artist is based in the Colonia Roma neighborhood, which is a center of underground and popular culture in Mexico City. His apartment is relatively spacious, with books and spaces for toys and other items he has designed. It is also filled with doors, with one leading to his studio. He works at home and does not have set hours, generally thinking about or working on projects all the time.

His time in Mexico has modified his pronunciation in Spanish, as well as vocabulary adapting Mexicanisms.

== Career ==
Professionally, Aldrete also goes by the name Dr. Alderte. It was derived from a character of the same name that he created while doing animation for MTV, for a show which has since been cancelled, but he kept the title Dr. for himself. Aldrete's work can be seen in public spaces and publications from Colonia Roma; Mexican, Argentine and Spanish magazines and art galleries in Latin America, the United States, Europe and Africa and is now studied by art and design students.

After graduating college, he worked for a time as an editor for various independent magazines and comic books, along with mainstream publications Fierro and the Argentine edition of Rolling Stone. The preparation he did in Argentina paid off in Mexico even securing work before he boarded the plane. In 1999, he published his first illustration in Mexico in a fanzine called SUB, for fans of science fiction, horror, fantasy and police stories. Since then his illustration work has been published in Complot, Matiz, Somos, Gallito Comics, Sputnik, Quo and Reforma. During his short time in Spain, he obtained work with the El País newspaper and the Zona de Obras magazine. He has also done animation work for MTV Latin America, MTV Japan as well as Nickelodeon Latin America, Fox Latin America, and Once TV. From 1999 to 2002 he edited the Zonaste graphics section of the Zona de Obras magazine, and he did a series of billboards for Nike.

However, most of his work is related to music, especially to the rock scene in Mexico City, creating flyers, CD covers and typographs. The main reason for this is his love of music, integrating himself into this world through bands and nightclubs soon after he arrived to Mexico. Musical groups with which he has worked include Los Straitjackets, Los Cavernarios, Los Twangers, Los Coronas, Twin Tones, Los Explosivos and Matorralman, designing about eighty CD covers, and doing all the promotional material for the band Lost Acapulco. Major gigs include the CD cover for Los Fabulosos Cadillacs La Luz del Ritmo (2008), and the billboards for the 2011 Vive Latino music festival in Mexico.

Aldrete's major break came from being included as one of the 150 best illustrators of the world, according to the book Illustration now! by Julius Wiedemann. He also had the good fortune to appear first due to the alphabetization of the entries. Since then, his work has appeared in other specialized anthologies such as Illusive, Pictoplasma, Los Logos series, Latino, Latin American Graphic Design, Place, Kustom Graphics and Play Loud.

Alderete's work has also been shown in art exhibits in Mexico and other countries, with his first individual show at the José María Velasco Gallery in 2006. Other important showings have been at the Museo de la Ciudad de México and the Museo de Arte Moderno. In 2014, the Festival Internacional Cervantino invited the designer to create part of the tribute to poet Efraín Huerta at the event, creating illustrations based on the Gran Cocodrilo (Great Crocodile) pieces.

In addition to the work he does for clients, Alderete has also opened a number of businesses. In 2006, he opened the Kong Gallery/Store in Colonia Roma with his wife which attracted guests such as which has had guests such as Gary Panter, Ames Brothers, Rinzen, Little Friends of Printmaking and Hula+Hula. In 2009, this enterprise was reopened as Vertigo, a cultural center for workshops, exhibitions, and the sales of shirts, books, music and more. In 2007, he founded a toy line called Plan B with Andrés Amaya, an industrial designer considered representative of Acid Neo Pop. He has also created a new record label called Isotonic Records with Juan Margues, the guitarist from the band Lost Acapulco. This label specializes in instrumental rock. Despite this activity, Aldrete does not consider himself to be an entrepreneur, as he does not do the marketing, rather just the ideas.

Aldrete is also an editor and publisher. In 2008, he published Yo soy Don Nadie, with documents his first ten years in Mexico with 45 portraits of his friends, accompanied with an anecdotes in English, French and Spanish depending on how he knows the person. The title is derived from a Los Pardos song. Since 2010, he has been the editor of the English-language publisher Korero Books, which has published The Day of the Dead (2010) and Mexican Graphics (2012). In 2012, he published two other compilations of his work, Sonorama and Otro Yo. Otro yo contains 148 works which originally were in about a dozen comics over seven years, published in collaboration with CONACULTA. Sonorama covers his relationships with rock bands and compiles twenty years of his work along with music.

Aldrete's work has resulted in a number of various recognitions and invitations. One early one was a prize from the Society for New Design and has been invited to the Toffie Pop Culture Festival and to France's Festival de Cómic de Aix in Provence. In 2010, the Secretary of Culture, Recreation and Sport of Colombia and the El Malpensante magazine chose him as one of the best illustrators of Iberoamerica, to participate in an exhibition that toured for the bicentennial of many Latin American countries that year.

== Artistry ==
Aldrete does not distinguish between art and design, and his work is strongly surrealist and kitsch. His graphics lean heavily toward a comic book aesthetic with influences from science fiction, graffiti, horror movies and US underground comics. Julius Wiedemann, (who popularized his work in Illustration now!) defines Alderete's style as "a "pop" style with images of cultural garbage, 1950s science fiction movies, Mexican lucha libre wrestling and surf music in illustrations, animations and psychotropic comics." Aldrete has stated that "kitsch escapes his hand and it's impossible to control." Common elements include Mexico City graffiti, lucha libre, monsters, aliens and 1950s and 1960s glamour symbols. Images have included a mutant with a cigarette and cocktail in a 1960s style scene, soccer player Maradona as an apostle with a burning soccer ball over his heart, a female vampire with a green face, and beehive hairdo, Mao Tse-tung with Mickey Mouse ears.

According to Aldrete, one thing that distinguishes him from other designers in Mexico is that as a foreigner, he can be attracted to elements of Mexican popular culture, such as lucha libre, that others would shun because it is of the lower classes. He had watched lucha libre as a child so when in Mexico he wanted to learn more about it, also interested in its graphic appeal. However, no one wanted to go with him to events when he first came to Mexico, and he began drawing the masks to find out more about the wrestlers and has since incorporated elements of this entertainment into his work.

Ninety five percent of Alderete's work starts out on paper, to be digitalized later and sent as far as England, Norway, the United States and South Africa. The reason for this mixed media is that he began studying his career as digital techniques came to be standard in his field, making his formation half traditional and half digital, for example sketching by hand but doing color management digitally. It is also the reason that he shuns the ubiquitous use of Macs in modern graphic design and instead relies on Corel Draw on PC.
