= The Eternal Feminine (2017 film) =

2017 film

- Theatrical release poster
- Directed by: Natalia Beristáin
- Starring: Karina Gidi; Tessa Ía; Daniel Giménez Cacho
- Release date: 26 October 2017 (FICM)
- Running time: 85 minutes
- Country: Mexico
- Language: Spanish

The Eternal Feminine (Spanish: Los adioses) is a 2017 Mexican biographical film based on Mexican poet and author Rosario Castellanos.

== Cast ==
- Karina Gidi as adult Rosario Castellanos
- Tessa Ía as young Rosario Castellanos
- Daniel Giménez Cacho as adult Ricardo Guerra Tejada
- Pedro de Tavira as young Ricardo Guerra Tejada
