= Ricardo Guerra Tejada =

Mexican academic and diplomat (1927–2007)

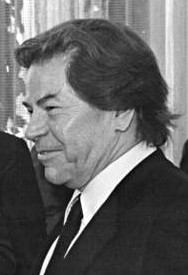
Ricardo Guerra Tejada

Ricardo Guerra Tejada (10 February 1927 – 30 May 2007) was a Mexican philosopher, journalist, diplomat, and civil servant.

Guerra Tejada received his Ph.D. from the University of Paris; he also studied in Germany. He founded the Grupo Hyperión, Mexico's first philosophical association, in 1947.

Guerra Tejada served two terms as director in the Faculty of Philosophy, from 1970 to 1974 and 1974 to 1978. He was the Mexican ambassador to the German Democratic Republic from 1978 to 1983. Guerra Tejada then founded the Morelos Cultural Institute in 1989, and was its first director through 1994. After that, he founded the Center for Research and Teaching of the Humanities of Morelos, and led it until his death in 2007.

In 2005, Guerra Tejada received the National University Prize from the National Autonomous University of Mexico.

== Family ==
He was the spouse of Mexican writer and diplomat Rosario Castellanos. Their only son, Gabriel Guerra Castellanos, is a Mexican political scientist who studied in Berlin.
