= I Dream in Another Language =

2017 Mexican drama film by Ernesto Contreras

- Film poster
- Directed by: Ernesto Contreras
- Written by: Carlos Contreras
- Produced by: Mónica Lozano; Luis Albores; Érika Ávila; Eamon O’Farrill; Dijana Olcay-Hot; Raymond Van Der Kaaij
- Starring: Fernando Álvarez Rebeil; José Manuel Poncelis; Eligio Meléndez; Fátima Molina
- Cinematography: Tonatiuh Martínez
- Edited by: Jorge Macaya
- Music by: Andrés Sánchez
- Distributed by: Gussi Cinema
- Release date: 23 January 2017 (Sundance)
- Running time: 103 minutes
- Country: Mexico
- Language: Spanish

I Dream in Another Language (Spanish: Sueño en otro idioma) is a 2017 Mexican drama film directed by Ernesto Contreras. It was screened in the World Cinema Dramatic Competition section of the 2017 Sundance Film Festival. The film's theme revolves around the conservation of Indigenous language and culture, placing it within a larger movement of Latin-American films that feature Indigenous languages in order to give a voice to those historically silenced.

== Plot ==
The story follows Martin, a linguist who travels to the rainforest of Veracruz, Mexico to try to record and understand Zikril, a fictional Indigenous language that is dying in the region. However, upon arriving in the village where he will live for months he discovers that Isauro and Evaristo, the last two speakers of Zikril, have refused to speak to each other for the last 50 years because of a longstanding grudge. Stories from the rest of the villagers imply that the fight was over their mutual love of Evaristo’s late wife. Inspiration for this story came from Contreras' grandmother, who spoke the Indigenous language of Zapoteco.

Because of the urgency of the project and Isauro’s declining health, Martin tries his best to settle the feud between these two childhood friends. He enlists the help of Evaristo’s granddaughter and the two build a strong relationship. It is revealed through flashbacks that the real fuel behind their hatred is their forbidden love for each other, which was considered taboo and sinful at the time, and the two resented each other for that.

After Isauro's passing, Evaristo travels to The Encanto, where the Zikril peoples go to rest, to apologize and mourn his lost lover. In a surprising turn of events, Isauro replies and the two finally reunite in the afterlife. Although the language dies along with its last two native speakers, the linguist, Martin has gained an understanding of the intricacies and beauties of its history.

== Cast ==
- Fernando Álvarez Rebeil as Martín
- José Manuel Poncelis as Isauro
- Eligio Meléndez as Evaristo
- Fátima Molina as Lluvia
- Norma Angélica as Flaviana

== Themes ==
=== Linguistics ===
Although the actors speak seemingly fluent Zikril, the language itself does not exist outside of the scope of the movie. Contreras wanted to use a separate language out of respect for those who still speak these disappearing languages. To do this, he hired a linguist to create an entirely new alphabet and vocabulary and then teach it to the actors so that they could understand the tonalities and words to pass off as native speakers. Contreras also worked with the film's composer to create a lullaby in this fictional language. The film omits captions over conversations taking place in Zikril, except for certain moments, such as the very end when the two childhood friends make amends. The audience then becomes a part of the outsiders that view these two individuals. This omission allows the film to not focus on the language, but on human connection and relationships.

"I Dream"'s storyline closely resembles a headline published in 2011 by The Guardian that reported a dying language in Mexico known as Ayapa Zoque that was doomed because the last two speakers had a grudge and wouldn't speak to each other. This story, though untrue, was reprinted globally in publications including Sydney Morning Herald and Time magazine. Nonetheless, the article highlights the state of many other dying Indigenous languages.

=== Spanish Colonialism ===
A sub-plot throughout this film follows the history of the Spanish colonization of Veracruz and the missionaries that aimed at converting the locals to Catholicism and teaching them Spanish. This story draws upon the history of many Indigenous peoples in Latin America, whose culture and languages were erased as a byproduct of colonialism, and their people were forced to assimilate. Evaristo's granddaughter teaches English over the radio and hopes to live in America one day. She represents a new generation of people that are trying to grasp ahold of a new language, English, just as her grandfather's generation tried to grasp Spanish in a changing world. Contreras comments that "it was an opportunity to speak not only about language but about a loss of an identity, we don’t realize when it happens in terms of culture, knowledge, roots, traditions, etc.”

=== Magic Realism ===
In the film, the native people have a spiritual connection to the rainforest and its inhabitants—Zikril is the language that allows them to communicate with the jungle. This communication is shown in a scene where the birds seemingly respond in conversation with a native speaker. Part of the film dives into their belief in the afterlife: in this fictional culture, it is believed that when a person is ready to leave this life they return to their ancestors in a mystical cave (El Encanto) in the forest. The end of the film highlights the use of magic realism throughout the story: in the final scene we see Evaristo go to the cave to apologize to Isauro and proclaim his love, and in a surprising turn of events, Isauro responds, and the two reunite in the afterlife.

The Journal of Religion and Film asserts that "It is not a documentary about disappearing languages but a whimsical fable about love and acceptance, framed in the context of post-colonial societies that seek to preserve their cultural beliefs and traditions." The choice to create a fictional language and culture shows Contreras' attempt to appreciate the value in traditions and history rather than to create political commentary.

== Reception ==
Directed by Ernesto Contreras, the former President of the Mexican Academy of Cinematographic Arts and Sciences, and written by his brother Carlos Contreras, the film first premiered at the Sundance International Film Festival, where it won the Audience Award for World Cinema Dramatic. It was also well-received in the 60th Premios Ariel (Ariel Awards), one of the most prestigious ceremonies in the Mexican film industry. It was the most nominated and most awarded film that year with 6 awards in Best Original Screenplay, Best Picture, Best Actor, Best Original Score, Best Sound, and Best Cinematography.

On review aggregator website Rotten Tomatoes, the film holds an approval rating of 80%, based on 15 reviews, and an average rating of 7.02/10.
