= Maya Goded =

Mexican photographer and filmmaker

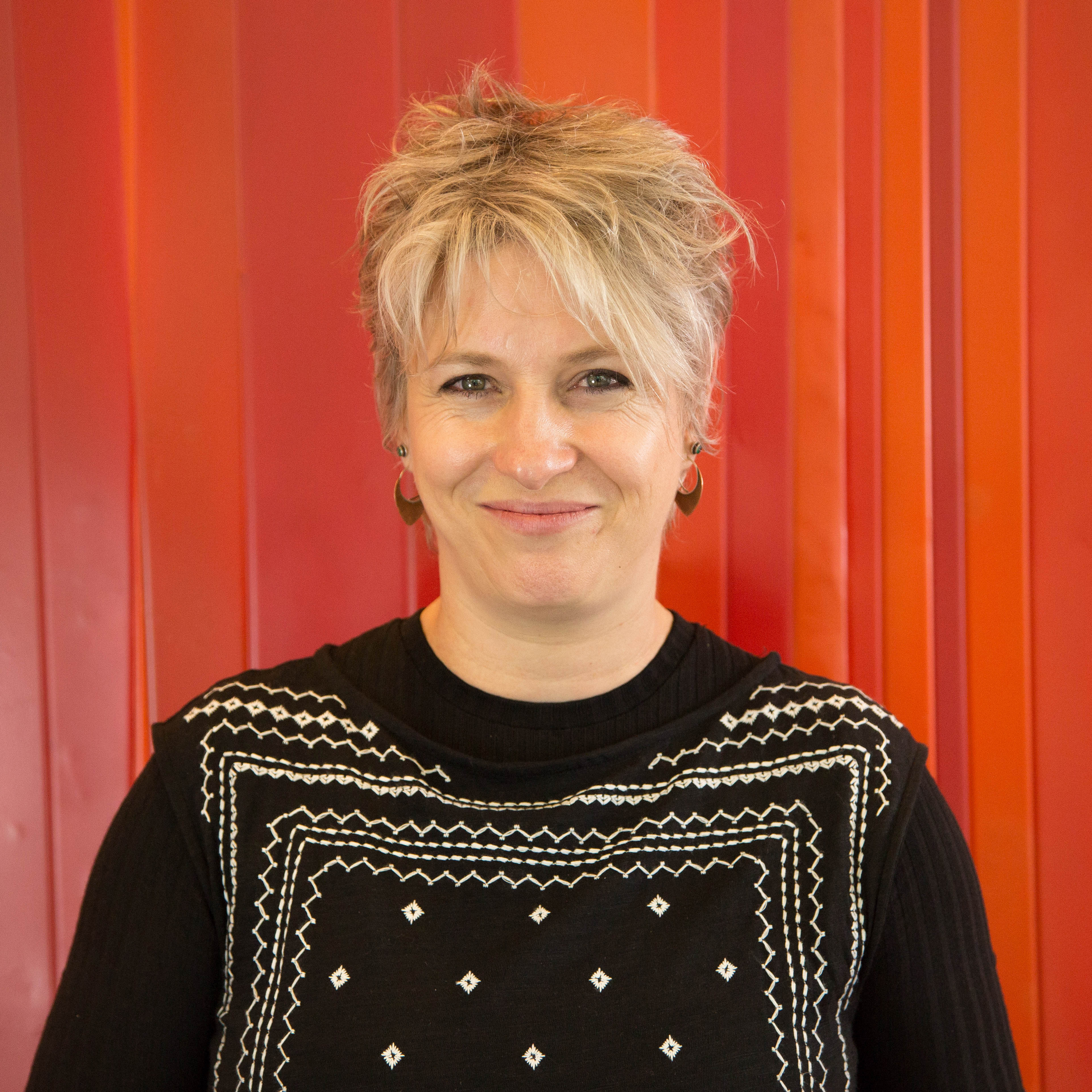
- Born: Maya Goded Colichio; 1967 (age 58–59); Mexico City
- Known for: Photography and film documentaries of people from hidden or shunned communities
- Notable work: Tierra Negra, Plaza de la Soledad, Good Girls
- Awards: Masterclass, World Press Photo (2006), Prince Claus Award (2010) and more

Maya Goded Colichio (born 1967, Mexico City, Mexico) is a Mexican photographer and documentary film maker. Since 2002 she has been allied with Magnum Photos and has developed a special focus on images of people from hidden or shunned communities. In 2019 Vogue Magazine identified her as one of the "8 Mexican female photographers who are breaking through on a global level."

== Life ==
Goded was born in 1967 in Mexico City. In 1993 she worked as an assistant to Mexican photographer Graciela Iturbide.

She did her first project in 1994, called Tierra Negra (Black Earth). She worked for three years on this project which consists of a collection images of Afro-Mexicans.

Subsequently, she went on to explore female sexuality, gender violence, prostitution, and the way women in Mexican society are seen in the traditional role of motherhood. Furthermore, she investigates people in harsh living conditions, or living in hidden, or shunned communities. Her photographs are accompanied by a name and description of the life of the person portrayed.

The work in her exhibition "Sexoservidoras" at the Reina Sofia Museum in Madrid, Spain was described as:

Goded does not propose the glorification of these women, but rather wants to establish an iconography of a model that is the complete opposite of the good and perfect Christian mother. Sexoservidoras refers to those prostitutes living in the margins, victims of the guiding principle of morality in Mexico.

Goded has published several books and has been the co-author of others as well. She has won several international awards. In 2009 she was involved in the making of a video and a short film, called Una Reina a su Gusto. After this she concentrated on the making of documentary films.

Her 2016 release film about ageing Mexican prostitutes, Plaza de la Soledad (Loneliness Square), won the Impulso Morelia Prize at the 2015 Festival Internacional de Cine de Morelia, in Mexico. The film has been described as "a sumptuous visual celebration and a refreshingly honest exploration of physical and emotional self-determination against difficult odds."

== Awards ==
Goded's work has been the subject of academic research and has also won several international awards. Here follows a selection:

- 1993: First Prize, Mother Jones Foundation
- 1994: First Prize, Mexico at Crossroads, LMU Munich, Germany
- 1996: Masterclass, World Press Photo
- 2000: Fotopres '01 – La Caixa Foundation
- 2001: W. Eugene Smith Grant
- 2003: Guggenheim Fellowship
- 2004: System Nacional de Creators
- 2010: Prince Claus Award
- 2015 Impulso Morelia Prize

== Bibliography ==
- 1994: Tierra negra: fotografías de la Costa Chica en Guerrero y Oaxaca, México, El Milagro
- 2006: Plaza de la Soledad, Lunwerg, Spain, ISBN 978-8497852722
- 2006: Good Girls, Umbrage Editions, ISBN 9781884167621
