= 37th Ariel Awards =

1995 Mexican film awards

- Date: June 26, 1995

Highlights
- Best Picture: El Callejon de los Milagros
- Most awards: El Callejon de los Milagros (11)
- Most nominations: El Callejon de los Milagros (22)

The 37th Ariel Awards ceremony, organized by the Mexican Academy of Film Arts and Sciences (AMACC) took place on June 26, 1995, in Mexico City. During the ceremony, AMACC presented the Ariel Award in 21 categories honoring films released in 1994. El Callejón de los Milagros received eleven awards out of 22 nominations, including Best Picture and Best Director for Jorge Fons. Bienvenido — Welcome followed with six awards; Dos Crímenes with three; Hasta Morir with two; and Un Volcán con Lava de Hielo with one.

== Winners and nominees ==
Winners are listed first and highlighted with boldface.

**Best Picture**: **El Callejón de los Milagros**; Bienvenido — Welcome; Dos Crímenes; El Jardín del Edén; Hasta Morir	**Best Director**: **Jorge Fons** – **El Callejón de los Milagros**; Maria Novaro – El Jardín del Edén; Gabriel Retes – Bienvenido — Welcome; Fernando Sariñana – Hasta Morir; Roberto Sneider – Dos Crímenes
**Best Actor**: **Demián Bichir** – **Hasta Morir**; Damián Alcázar – Dos Crímenes; Bruno Bichir – El Jardín del Edén; Ernesto Gómez Cruz – El Callejón de los Milagros; Luis Felipe Tovar – Bienvenido — Welcome	**Best Actress**: **Margarita Sanz** – **El Callejón de los Milagros**; Blanca Guerra – En Medio de la Nada; Salma Hayek – El Callejón de los Milagros; Dolores Heredia – Dos Crímenes; María Rojo – Los Vuelcos del Corazón
**Best Supporting Actor**: **José Carlos Ruíz** – **Dos Crímenes**; Fernando Arau – Bienvenido — Welcome; Daniel Giménez Cacho – El Callejón de los Milagros; Esteban Soberanes – El Callejón de los Milagros	**Best Supporting Actress**: **Margarita Isabel** – **Dos Crímenes**; Vanessa Bauche – Hasta Morir; Leticia Huijara – Dos Crímenes; Ana Ofelia Murguía – El Jardín del Edén; Tiaré Scanda – El Callejón de los Milagros
**Best Actor in a Minor Role**: **Luis Felipe Tovar** – **El Callejón de los Milagros**; Pedro Armendáriz – Dos Crímenes; Ernesto Gómez Cruz – Los Vuelcos del Corazón; Ignacio Retes – Bienvenido — Welcome; Oscar Yoldi – El Callejón de los Milagros	**Best Actress in a Minor Role**: **María Fernanda García** – **Bienvenido — Welcome**; Dolores Beristáin – Hasta Morir; Delia Casanova – El Callejón de los Milagros; María Rojo – El Callejón de los Milagros
**Best Original Story**: **Bienvenido — Welcome – Gabriel Retes and María del Pozo**; En el Aire – Alicia García and Juan Carlos Llaca; El Jardín del Edén – Beatríz Novaro and Maria Novaro; Hasta Morir – Marcela Fuentes-Berain	**Best Screenplay**: **El Callejón de los Milagros** – **Vicente Leñero** from Zuqāq al-Midaq by Naguib Mahfouz; Bienvenido — Welcome – Gabriel Retes and María del Pozo from their original story; Dos Crímenes – Roberto Sneider from Dos Crímenes by Jorge Ibargüengoitia; Hasta Morir – Marcela Fuentes-Berain from her original story; Los Vuelcos del Corazón – Mitl Valdez from Resurrección Sin Vida by José Revueltas
**Best First Feature Film**: **Dos Crímenes – Roberto Sneider**; En el Aire – Juan Carlos Llaca; Hasta Morir – Fernando Sariñana	**Best Live Action Short Film**: **Un Volcán con Lava de Hielo** – **Valentina Leduc**; Del Otro Lado del Mar – Marcella Arteaga; El Árbol de la Música – Isabelle Tardan and Sabina Berman
**Best Original Score**: **Bienvenido — Welcome – Angel Romero**; **El Callejón de los Milagros – Lucía Álvarez**; Dos Crímenes – Arturo Márquez; En el Aire – Alejandro Giacomán; Hasta Morir – Enrique Quezadas	**Best Original Music Theme or Song**: **El Callejón de los Milagros – Lucía Álvarez**; Hasta Morir – Enrique Quezadas and Fernando Sariñana; Los Vuelcos del Corazón – Mitl Valdez
**Best Cinematography**: **Bienvenido — Welcome – Chuy Elizondo**; Dos Crímenes – Carlos Marcovich; El Callejón de los Milagros – Carlos Marcovich; En el Aire – Carlos Rocha; Hasta Morir – Guillermo Granillo	**Best Film Editing**: **Bienvenido — Welcome – Carlos Salces**; **El Callejón de los Milagros – Carlos Savage**; Dos Crímenes – Óscar Figueroa; Hasta Morir – Carlos Bolado
**Best Production Design**: **El Callejón de los Milagros – Carlos Gutiérrez**; Dos Crímenes – Marisa Pecanins; Hasta Morir – Gloria Carrasco	**Best Set Design**: **Bienvenido — Welcome – Miguel Peraza**; Dos Crímenes – Marisa Pecanins; El Callejón de los Milagros – Carlos Gutiérrez; El Jardín del Edén – Brigitte Broch; Hasta Morir – Gloria Carrasco; Los Vuelcos del Corazón – Jaime García
**Best Costume Design**: **El Callejón de los Milagros – Jaime Ortíz**; En el Aire – Mónica Neumaier; Los Vuelcos del Corazón – faes Moreno	**Best Makeup**: **El Callejón de los Milagros – Elvia Romero**; Dos Crímenes – Laura San Martín; En el Aire – Lucrecia González
**Best Sound**: **Hasta Morir – Miguel Sandoval**; Bienvenido — Welcome – Evelia Cruz; Dos Crímenes – David Baksht, Salvador de la Fuente and Gabriel Romo; El Callejón de los Milagros – David Baksht; En el Aire – Antonio Diego	**Best Special Effects**: (No winner announced); Días de Combate – Alejandro Vázquez; En el Aire – Alejandro Vázquez; Hasta Morir – Alejandro Vázquez; En Medio de la Nada – Alejandro Vázquez

== Special awards ==
- Golden Ariel – Manuel Esperón
- Salvador Toscano Medal – Lupita Marino
- Special recognition – Carmen Montejo

== Multiple nominations and awards ==
The following eight films received multiple nominations:

Nominations	Film
22	El Callejón de los Milagros
17	Dos Crímenes
16	Hasta Morir
13	Bienvenido — Welcome
8	En el Aire
6	El Jardín del Edén
6	Los Vuelcos del Corazón
2	En Medio de la Nada

Films that received multiple awards:

Awards	Film
11	El Callejón de los Milagros
6	Bienvenido — Welcome
3	Dos Crímenes
2	Hasta Morir
