= Ariel Award for Best Picture =

Ariel Award category

The Ariel Award for Best Picture (Ariel de Mejor Película in Spanish) is the highest award given in Mexico to a single film and is part of the Mexican Academy of Film's Ariel Award program.

== Award results ==
=== 1940s ===
Year	English title	Original title	Director
1945 (2nd)
1945 (2nd)	The Shack	La barraca	Roberto Gavaldón
1945 (2nd)	The Abandoned	Las abandonadas	Emilio Fernández
1945 (2nd)	Twilight	Crepúsculo	Julio Bracho

Year	English title	Original title	Director
1946 (3rd)
1946 (3rd)	Enamorada		Emilio Fernández
1946 (3rd)	Champion Without a Crown	Campeón sin corona	Alejandro Galindo
1946 (3rd)	La otra		Roberto Gavaldón

Year	English title	Original title	Director
1947 (4th)
1947 (4th)	The Pearl	La perla	Emilio Fernández
1947 (4th)	El buen mozo		Antonio Momplet
1947 (4th)	Five Faces of Woman	Cinco rostros de mujer	Gilberto Martínez Solares

Year	English title	Original title	Director
1948 (5th)
1948 (5th)	Río Escondido		Emilio Fernández
1948 (5th)	Que Dios me perdone		Tito Davison
1948 (5th)	Rosenda		Julio Bracho

Year	English title	Original title	Director
1949 (6th)
1949 (6th)	A Family Like Many Others	Una familia de tantas	Alejandro Galindo
1949 (6th)	El dolor de los hijos		Miguel Zacarías
1949 (6th)	Pueblerina		Emilio Fernández

=== 1950s ===
Year	English title	Original title	Director
1950 (7th)
1950 (7th)	In the Palm of Your Hand	En la palma de tu mano	Roberto Gavaldón
1950 (7th)	Desired	Deseada	Roberto Gavaldón
1950 (7th)	Doña Perfecta		Alejandro Galindo

Year	English title	Original title	Director
1951 (8th)
1951 (8th)	El jurado se declaró desierto		
1951 (8th)		El rebozo de Soledad	Roberto Gavaldón
1951 (8th)		Mi esposa y la otra	Alfredo B. Crevenna
1951 (8th)		Subida al cielo	Luis Buñuel

Year	English title	Original title	Director
1952 (9th)
1952 (9th)		El niño y la niebla	Roberto Gavaldón
1952 (9th)		Las tres perfectas casadas	Roberto Gavaldón
1952 (9th)		Un divorcio	Emilio Gómez Muriel

1953 — Not awarded

Year	English title	Original title	Director
1954 (10th)
1954 (10th)		Los Fernández de Peralvillo	Alejandro Galindo
1954 (10th)		Orquídeas para mi esposa	Alfredo B. Crevenna
1954 (10th)		Sombra verde	Roberto Gabaldón

Year	English title	Original title	Director
1955 (11th)
1955 (11th)		Robinson Crusoe	Luis Buñuel
1955 (11th)		Ensayo de un crimen	Luis Buñuel
1955 (11th)		Una mujer en la calle	Alfredo B. Crevenna

Year	English title	Original title	Director
1956 (12th)
1956 (12th)		El camino de la vida	Alfonso Corona Blake
1956 (12th)		La escondida	Roberto Gavaldón
1956 (12th)		Talpa	Alfredo B. Crevenna

Year	English title	Original title	Director
1957 (13th)
1957 (13th)		Tizoc	Ismael Rodríguez
1957 (13th)		Feliz año, amor mío	Tulio Demicheli
1957 (13th)		La culta dama	Rogelio A. González

1959 to 1971 — Awards suspended

=== 1970s ===
Year	English title	Original title	Director
1972 (14th)
1972 (14th)		El castillo de la pureza	Arturo Ripstein
1972 (14th)		Mecánica nacional	Luis Alcoriza
1972 (14th)		Reed, México insurgente	Paul Leduc

Year	English title	Original title	Director
1973 (15th)
1973 (15th)		El principio	Gonzalo Martínez Ortega
1973 (15th)		El cambio	Alfredo Joskowicz
1973 (15th)		Fe, esperanza y caridad	Luis Alcoriza, Alberto Bojórquez and Jorge Fons

Year	English title	Original title	Director
1974 (16th)
1974 (16th)		La Choca	Emilio "Indio" Fernández
1974 (16th)		La otra virginidad	Juan Manuel Torres
1974 (16th)		Presagio	Luis Alcoriza

Year	English title	Original title	Director
1975 (17th)
1975 (17th)		Actas de Marusia	Miguel Littín
1975 (17th)		Canoa	Felipe Cazals
1975 (17th)		De todos modos Juan te llamas	Marcela Fernández Violante

Year	English title	Original title	Director
1976 (18th)
1976 (18th)		La pasión según Berenice	Jaime Humberto Hermosillo
1976 (18th)		Cuartelazo	Alberto Isaac
1976 (18th)		Longitud de guerra	Gonzalo Martínez Ortega

Year	English title	Original title	Director
1977 (19th)
1977 (19th)		El lugar sin límites	Arturo Ripstein
1977 (19th)		Naufragio	Jaime Humberto Hermosillo
1977 (19th)		Los pequeños privilegios	Julián Pastor

Year	English title	Original title	Director
1978 (20th)
1978 (20th)		Cadena perpetua	Arturo Ripstein
1978 (20th)		Anacrusa	Ariel Zúñiga
1978 (20th)		El recurso del método	Miguel Littín

Year	English title	Original title	Director
1979 (21st)
1979 (21st)		El año de la peste	Felipe Cazals
1979 (21st)		El infierno de todos tan temido	Sergio Olhovich
1979 (21st)		Fuego en el mar	Raúl Araiza

=== 1980s ===
Year	English title	Original title	Director
1980 (22nd)
1980 (22nd)		Las grandes aguas	Servando González
1980 (22nd)		Misterio	Marcela Fernández Violante
1980 (22nd)		Morir de Madrugada	Julián Pastor

Year	English title	Original title	Director
1981 (23rd)
1981 (23rd)		Ora sí ¡tenemos que ganar!	Raúl Kamffer
1981 (23rd)		Llámenme Mike	Alfredo Gurrola
1981 (23rd)		Noche de carnaval	Mario Hernández

Year	English title	Original title	Director
1982 (24th)
1982 (24th)		La pachanga	José Estrada
1982 (24th)		Días de combate	Alfredo Gurrola
1982 (24th)		Tiempo de lobos	Alberto Isaac

Year	English title	Original title	Director
1983 (25th)
1983 (25th)		Bajo la metralla	Felipe Cazals
1983 (25th)		La viuda negra	Arturo Ripstein
1983 (25th)		Nocaut	José Luis García Agraz

Year	English title	Original title	Director
1984 (26th)
1984 (26th)		Frida, naturaleza viva	Paul Leduc
1984 (26th)		De veras me atrapaste	Gerardo Pardo
1984 (26th)		Vidas errantes	Juan Antonio de la Riva

Year	English title	Original title	Director
1985 (27th)
1985 (27th)		Veneno para las hadas	Carlos Enrique Taboada
1985 (27th)		Los motivos de Luz	Felipe Cazals
1985 (27th)		Redondo	Raúl Busteros

Year	English title	Original title	Director
1986 (28th)
1986 (28th)		El imperio de la fortuna	Arturo Ripstein
1986 (28th)		Amor a la vuelta de la esquina	Alberto Cortés
1986 (28th)		Crónica de familia	Diego López Rivera

Year	English title	Original title	Director
1987 (29th)
1987 (29th)		Mariana, Mariana	Alberto Isaac
1987 (29th)		Lo que importa es vivir	Luis Alcoriza
1987 (29th)		Días difíciles	Alejandro Pelayo

Year	English title	Original title	Director
1988 (30th)
1988 (30th)		Esperanza	Sergio Olhovich
1988 (30th)		¿Nos traicionará el presidente?	Juan Fernando Pérez Gavilán
1988 (30th)		El secreto de Romelia	Busi Cortés

Year	English title	Original title	Director
1989 (31st)
1989 (31st)		Goitia, un dios para sí mismo	Diego López Rivera
1989 (31st)		El homicida	Alfonso Rosas Priego
1989 (31st)		Morir en el golfo	Alejandro Pelayo

=== 1990s ===
Year	English title	Original title	Director
1990 (32nd)
1990 (32nd)		Rojo amanecer	Jorge Fons
1990 (32nd)		Pueblo de madera	Juan Antonio de la Riva

Year	English title	Original title	Director
1991 (33rd)
1991 (33rd)		Como agua para chocolate	Alfonso Arau
1991 (33rd)		Danzón	María Novaro
1991 (33rd)		La mujer de Benjamín	Carlos Carrera

Year	English title	Original title	Director
1992 (34th)
1992 (34th)	Cronos	La invención de Cronos	Guillermo del Toro
1992 (34th)		Ángel de fuego	Dana Rotberg
1992 (34th)		Tequila	Rúben Gámez

Year	English title	Original title	Director
1993 (35th)
1993 (35th)		Principio y fin	Arturo Ripstein
1993 (35th)		Desiertos mares	José Luis García Agraz
1993 (35th)		Lolo	Francisco Athié
1993 (35th)		La vida conyugal	Carlos Carrera
1993 (35th)		Novia que te vea	Guita Schyfter

Year	English title	Original title	Director
1994 (36th)
1994 (36th)		El callejón de los milagros	Jorge Fons
1994 (36th)		Bienvenido-Welcome	Gabriel Retes
1994 (36th)		Dos crímenes	Roberto Sneider
1994 (36th)		El jardín del edén	María Novaro
1994 (36th)		Hasta morir	Fernando Sariñana

Year	English title	Original title	Director
1995 (37th)
1995 (37th)		Sin Remitente	Carlos Carrera
1995 (37th)		Dulces compañías	Oscar Blancarte
1995 (37th)		Entre Pancho Villa y una mujer desnuda	Sabina Berman, Isabelle Tardán
1995 (37th)		Mujeres insumisas	Alberto Isaac
1995 (37th)		La reina de la noche	Arturo Ripstein

Year	English title	Original title	Director
1996 (38th)
1996 (38th)	Sender Unknown	Sin remitente	Carlos Carrera
1996 (38th)	The Queen of the Night	La reina de la noche	Arturo Ripstein
1996 (38th)		Entre Pancho Villa y una mujer desnuda	Sabina Berman, Isabelle Tardán
1996 (38th)		Dulces compañías	Óscar Blancarte
1996 (38th)		Mujeres insumisas	Alberto Isaac

Year	English title	Original title	Director
1997 (39th)
1997 (39th)	Cilantro and Parsley	Cilantro y Perejil	Rafael Montero
1997 (39th)	Deep Crimson	Profundo carmesí	Arturo Ripstein
1997 (39th)	Santo Luzbel		Miguel Sabido
1997 (39th)		Reclusorio	Ismael Rodríguez

Year	English title	Original title	Director
1998 (40th)
1998 (40th)		Por si no te vuelvo a ver	Juan Pablo Villaseñor
1998 (40th)	Esmeralda Comes by Night	De noche vienes, Esmeralda	Jaime Humberto Hermosillo
1998 (40th)	Elisa Before the End of the World	Elisa antes del fin del mundo	Juan Antonio de la Riva

Year	English title	Original title	Director
1999 (41st)
1999 (41st)	Bajo California: El límite del tiempo		Carlos Bolado
1999 (41st)	Divine	El evangelio de las maravillas	Óscar Urrutia Lazo
1999 (41st)	Un embrujo		Carlos Carrera

=== 2000s ===
Year	English title	Original title	Director
2000 (42nd)
2000 (42nd)	Herod's Law	La ley de Herodes	Luis Estrada
2000 (42nd)	Terminal Rite	Rito terminal	Óscar Urrutia Lazo
2000 (42nd)	Juan, I Forgot I Don't Remember	Del olvido al no me acuerdo	Juan Carlos Rulfo

Year	English title	Original title	Director
2001 (43rd)
2001 (43rd)	Amores perros		Alejandro G. Iñárritu
2001 (43rd)	Violet Perfume: No One Is Listening	Nadie te oye: Perfume de violetas	Marisa Sistach
2001 (43rd)	His Most Serene Highness	Su alteza serenísima	Felipe Cazals

Year	English title	Original title	Director
2002 (44th)
2002 (44th)	Bedtime Fairy Tales for Crocodiles	Cuentos de hadas para dormir cocodrilos	Ignacio Ortiz
2002 (44th)	The Mountain Hawk	Ciudades oscuras	Juan Antonio de la Riva
2002 (44th)	Streeters	De la calle	Gerardo Tort

Year	English title	Original title	Director
2003 (45th)
2003 (45th)	The Crime of Padre Amaro	El crimen del Padre Amaro	Carlos Carrera
2003 (45th)	Dark City	Ciudades oscuras	Fernando Sariñana
2003 (45th)	Aro Tolbukhin in the Mind of a Killer	Aro Tolbukhin - En la mente del asesino	Isaac-Pierre Racine, Agustí Villaronga, Lydia Zimmermann

Year	English title	Original title	Director
2004 (46th)
2004 (46th)	El misterio del Trinidad		José Luis García Agraz
2004 (46th)	A Thousand Clouds of Peace	Mil nubes de paz cercan el cielo, amor, jamás acabarás de ser amor	Julián Hernández
2004 (46th)	Japón		Carlos Reygadas

Year	English title	Original title	Director
2005 (47th)
2005 (47th)	Duck Season	Temporada de patos	Fernando Eimbcke
2005 (47th)	Innocent Voices	Voces inocentes	Luis Mandoki
2005 (47th)	Manos libres		José Buil

Year	English title	Original title	Director
2006 (48th)
2006 (48th)	Mezcal		Ignacio Ortiz
2006 (48th)	News from Afar	Noticias lejanas	Ricardo Benet
2006 (48th)	Las vueltas del citrillo		Felipe Cazals

Year	English title	Original title	Director
2007 (49th)
2007 (49th)	Pan's Labyrinth	El laberinto del fauno	Guillermo del Toro
2007 (49th)	Cronicas	Crónicas	Sebastián Cordero
2007 (49th)	The Violin	El violín	Francisco Vargas

Year	English title	Original title	Director
2008 (50th)
2008 (50th)	Silent Light	Stellet Licht	Carlos Reygadas
2008 (50th)	El cobrador: In God We Trust	Cobrador: In God We Trust	Paul Leduc
2008 (50th)	Old Thieves: The Legend of Artegio	Los ladrones viejos. Las leyendas del artegio	Everardo González

Year	English title	Original title	Director
2009 (51st)
2009 (51st)	Lake Tahoe		Fernando Eimbcke
2009 (51st)	I'm Gonna Explode	Voy a explotar	Gerardo Naranjo
2009 (51st)	Shakespeare and Victor Hugo's Intimacies	Intimidades de Shakespeare y Víctor Hugo	Yulene Olaizola
2009 (51st)	Los herederos		Jorge Hernández Aldana

=== 2010s ===
Year	English title	Original title	Director
2010 (52nd)
2010 (52nd)	Nora's Will	Cinco días sin Nora	Mariana Chenillo
2010 (52nd)	Corazón del Tiempo		Alberto Cortés
2010 (52nd)	Northless	Norteado	Rigoberto Pérezcano
2011 (53rd)
2011 (53rd)	Hell	El infierno	Luis Estrada
2011 (53rd)	Abel		Diego Luna
2011 (53rd)	Chico Grande		Felipe Cazals
2012 (54th)
2012 (54th)	Pastorela		Emilio Portes
2012 (54th)	Miss Bala		Gerardo Naranjo
2012 (54th)	Días de gracia		Everardo Gout
2013 (55th)
2013 (55th)	The Prize	El premio	Paula Markovitch
2013 (55th)	The Delay	La demora	Rodrigo Plá
2013 (55th)	The Last Christeros	Los Últimos Cristeros	Matías Meyer
2014 (56th)
2014 (56th)	The Golden Dream	La jaula de oro	Diego Quemada-Díez
2014 (56th)	Club Sandwich	Club Sándwich	Fernando Eimbcke
2014 (56th)	Heli		Amat Escalante
2014 (56th)	The Amazing Catfish	Los insólitos peces gato	Claudia Sainte-Luce
2014 (56th)	She Doesn't Want to Sleep Alone	No quiero dormir sola	Natalia Beristáin
2015 (57th)
2015 (57th)	Güeros		Alonso Ruizpalacios
2015 (57th)	Carmin Tropical		Rigoberto Pérezcano
2015 (57th)	The Perfect Dictatorship	La dictadura perfecta	Luis Estrada
2015 (57th)	Guten Tag, Ramón		Jorge Ramírez-Suárez
2015 (57th)	The Obscure Spring	Las oscuras primaveras	Ernesto Contreras
2016 (58th)
2016 (58th)	The Chosen Ones	Las elegidas	David Pablos
2016 (58th)	600 Miles	600 Millas	Gabriel Ripstein
2016 (58th)	Gloria		Christian Keller
2016 (58th)	The Thin Yellow Line	La delgada línea amarilla	Celso R. García
2016 (58th)	A Monster with a Thousand Heads	Un Monstruo de Mil Cabezas	Rodrigo Plá
2017 (59th)
2017 (59th)	The 4th Company	La 4ª Compañía	Mitzi Vanessa Arreola and Amir Galván Cervera
2017 (59th)	Beauties of the Night	Bellas de noche	Maria Jose Cuevas
2017 (59th)	From Afar	Desde allá	Lorenzo Vigas
2017 (59th)	Desierto		Jonás Cuarón
2017 (59th)	Mara'akame's Dream	El Sueño del Mara'akame	Federico Cecchetti
2017 (59th)	You're Killing Me Susana	Me estás matando, Susana	Roberto Sneider
2017 (59th)	Tempestad		Tatiana Huezo
2018 (60th)
2018 (60th)	I Dream in Another Language	Sueño en otro idioma	Ernesto Contreras
2018 (60th)	Intimate Battles	Batallas íntimas	Lucía Gajá
2018 (60th)	Devil's Freedom	La libertad del diablo	Everardo González
2018 (60th)	The Untamed	La región salvaje	Amat Escalante
2018 (60th)	Time Share	Tiempo compartido	Sebastián Hofmann
2019 (61st)
2019 (61st)	Roma		Alfonso Cuarón
2019 (61st)	The Chambermaid	La camarista	Lila Avilés
2019 (61st)	The Good Girls	Las niñas bien	Alejandra Márquez Abella
2019 (61st)	Our Time	Nuestro tiempo	Carlos Reygadas
2019 (61st)	Museum	Museo	Alonso Ruizpalacios

=== 2020s ===
Year	English title	Original title	Director
2020 (62nd)
2020 (62nd)	I'm No Longer Here	Ya no estoy aquí	Fernando Frías de la Parra
2020 (62nd)	This Is Not Berlin	Esto no es Berlín	Hari Sama
2020 (62nd)	Suffocation	Asfixia	Kenya Marquez
2020 (62nd)	Buy Me a Gun	Cómprame un revólver	Julio Hernández Cordón
2020 (62nd)	Powder	Polvo	José María Yazpik
2021 (63rd)
2021 (63rd)	Identifying Features	Sin señas particulares	Fernanda Valadez
2021 (63rd)	Dance of the 41	El baile de los 41	David Pablos
2021 (63rd)	The Three Deaths of Marisela Escobedo	Las tres muertes de Marisela Escobedo	Carlos Pérez Osorio
2021 (63rd)	Los lobos	Los lobos	Samuel Kishi
2021 (63rd)	Tragic Jungle	Selva trágica	Yulene Olaizola
2022 (64th)
2022 (64th)	Prayers for the Stolen	Noche de fuego	Tatiana Huezo
2022 (64th)	Impossible Things	Cosas imposibles	Ernesto Contreras
2022 (64th)	Nudo Mixteco		Angeles Cruz
2022 (64th)	The Other Tom	El otro Tom	Rodrigo Pla, Laura Santullo
2022 (64th)	A Cop Movie	Una película de policías	Alonso Ruizpalacios
2023 (65th)
2023 (65th)	Northern Skies Over Empty Space	El norte sobre el vacío	Alejandra Márquez Abella
2023 (65th)	Bardo, False Chronicle of a Handful of Truths	Bardo, falsa crónica de unas cuantas verdades	Alejandro G. Iñárritu
2023 (65th)	La civil		Teodora Mihai
2023 (65th)	Dive	La caída	Lucía Puenzo
2023 (65th)	Huesera: The Bone Woman	Huesera	Michelle Garza Cervera
2024 (66th)
2024 (66th)	Tótem	Tótem	Lila Avilés
2024 (66th)	All the Silence	Todo el silencio	Diego del Río
2024 (66th)	The Echo	El eco	Tatiana Huezo
2024 (66th)	Heroic	Heroico	David Zonana
2024 (66th)	Hurricane Season	Temporada de huracanes	Elisa Miller
2025 (67th)
2025 (67th)	Sujo		Astrid Rondero, Fernanda Valadez
2025 (67th)	Bad Actor	Un actor malo	Jorge Cuchí
2025 (67th)	La cocina		Alonso Ruizpalacios
2025 (67th)	Pedro Páramo		Rodrigo Prieto
2025 (67th)	We Shall Not Be Moved	No nos moverán	Pierre Saint-Martin Castellanos
