= 16th Ariel Awards =

1974 Mexican film awards

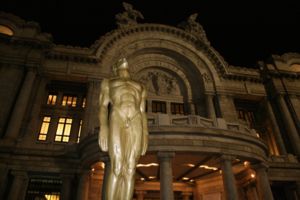
- Date: March 22, 1974

Highlights
- Best Picture: El Principio
- Most awards: El Principio (8)
- Most nominations: El Principio (11)

The 16th Ariel Awards ceremony, organized by the Mexican Academy of Film Arts and Sciences (AMACC) took place on March 22, 1974, in Mexico City. During the ceremony, AMACC presented the Ariel Award in 14 categories honoring films released in 1973. El Principio was the most nominated film, and also the most awarded with eight wins including a Special Award for child actor Rogelio Flores. El Principio won for Best Picture and Best Director. Two-time Ariel winner film, Calzonzin Inspector, directed by Alfonso Arau, was selected to represent Mexico at the 47th Academy Awards, but was not nominated.

== Winners and nominees ==
Winners are listed first and highlighted with boldface.

| **Best Picture**: **El Principio** – **Estudios Churubusco Azteca**; "Caridad" (episode from Fé, Esperanza y Caridad) – Ediciones Germán Camus; El Cambio – Departamento de Actividades Cinematográficas | **Best Director**: **Gonzalo Martínez Ortega** – **El Principio**; Jorge Fons – "Caridad" (episode from Fé, Esperanza y Caridad); Alfredo Joskowicz – El Cambio |
| **Best Actor**: **Pancho Córdova** – **"Caridad" (episode from Fé, Esperanza y Caridad)** **as Jacobo**; Sergio Jiménez – El Cambio; Ignacio López Tarso – El Profeta Mimí as Ángel Peñafiel / Mimí | **Best Actress**: **Katy Jurado** – **"Caridad" (episode from Fé, Esperanza y Caridad)** **as Eulogia**; Ofelia Medina – El Cambio; Lucha Villa – El Principio as María del Rayo |
| **Best Supporting Actor**: **Sergio Bustamante** – **El Principio** **as Don Pancho**; Andrés García – El Principio as Luciano; Alejandro Parodi – El Principio as Leobardo López | **Best Supporting Actress**: **Lina Montes** – **El Principio** **as Doña Cuca**; Carolina Barret – Calzonzin Inspector as Doña Pomposa; Mercedes Carreño – Los Perros de Dios |
| **Best Screenplay**: **Los Perros de Dios – Josefina Vicens**; El Cambio – Luis Carreón and Alfredo Joskowicz; El Principio – Gonzalo Martínez Ortega | **Best Original Story**: **El Principio – Gonzalo Martínez Ortega**; El Cambio – Leobaldo López; Los Perros de Dios – Josefina Vicens |
| **Best Original Score**: **El Principio – Rubén Fuentes**; El Cambio – Julio Estrada and Luis Celis; La Muerte de Pancho Villa – José Antonio Alcaraz | **Best Cinematography**: **Calzonzin Inspector – Jorge Stahl Jr.**; Arde, Baby, Arde – Alex Phillips; El Señor de Osanto – Gabriel Figueroa |
| **Best Film Editing**: **El Principio – Carlos Savage**; El Cambio – Ramón Aupart; El Profeta Mimí – Juan José Marino | **Best Art Direction**: **Calzonzin Inspector – José Luis González de León** |
| **Best Set Decoration**: **En Busca de un Muro – Enrique Estévez**; Calzonzin Inspector Víctor Fosado; El Señor de Osanto – Lucero Isaac | **Best Documentary Short Subject**: **No Nos Moverán – Breni Cuenca**; Baja California: Paralelo 28 – Carlos Velo; De Ayer y de Mañana – Ángel Flores Marini |

== Multiple nominations and awards ==
The following six films received multiple nominations:

| Nominations | Film |
|---|---|
| 11 | El Principio |
| 8 | El Cambio |
| 4 | Calzonzin Inspector |
| 4 | "Caridad" (episode from Fé, Esperanza y Caridad) |
| 2 | El Señor de Osanto |
| 2 | El Profeta Mimí |

Films that received multiple awards:

| Awards | Film |
|---|---|
| 8 | El Principio |
| 2 | "Caridad" (episode from Fé, Esperanza y Caridad) |
| 2 | Calzonzin Inspector |
