= 18th Ariel Awards =

1976 Mexican film awards

- Date: April 22, 1976

Highlights
- Best Picture: Actas de Marusia
- Most awards: Actas de Marusia (9)
- Most nominations: Actas de Marusia (12)

The 18th Ariel Awards ceremony, organized by the Mexican Academy of Film Arts and Sciences (AMACC) took place on April 22, 1976, in Mexico City. During the ceremony, AMACC presented the Ariel Award in 13 categories honoring films released in 1975. Actas de Marusia was the most nominated film with twelve nominations that resulted in nine wins, including Best Picture and Best Director. Actas de Marusia was selected to represent Mexico at the 48th Academy Awards and received a nomination, which it lost to Dersu Uzala from the Soviet Union.

== Winners and nominees ==
Winners are listed first and highlighted with boldface.

| **Best Picture**: **Actas de Marusia** – **CONACINE**; Canoa – STPC; De Todos Modos Juan Te Llamas – Centro Universitario de Estudios Cinematográficos | **Best Director**: **Miguel Littín** – **Actas de Marusia**; Felipe Cazals – Canoa; Marcela Fernández Violante – De Todos Modos Juan Te Llamas |
| **Best Actor**: **Jorge Russek** – **De Todos Modos Juan Te Llamas**; Juan Ferrara – De Todos Modos Juan Te Llamas; Enrique Lucero – Canoa as The Priest | **Best Actress**: **Rocío Brambila** – **De Todos Modos Juan Te Llamas**; Patricia Aspillaga – De Todos Modos Juan Te Llamas; Diana Bracho – Actas de Marusia as Luisa |
| **Best Supporting Actor**: **Ernesto Gómez Cruz** – **Actas de Marusia** **as Crisculo "Medio Juan"**; **Eduardo Lómez Rojas** – **Actas de Marusia** **as Domingo Soto**; **Claudio Obregón** – **Actas de Marusia** **as Captain Troncoso** | **Best Supporting Actress**: **Patricia Reyes Spíndola** – **Actas de Marusia** **as Rosa**; Graciela Doring – Coronación as Lourdes; Silvia Mariscal – Actas de Marusia as Margarita |
| **Best Screenplay**: **Actas de Marusia – Miguel Littín**; Canoa – Tomás Pérez Turrent; De Todos Modos Juan Te Llamas – Marcela Fernández Violante, Adrián Palomeque, and Mitl Valdez Salazar | **Best Original Story**: **Canoa – Tomás Pérez Turrent**; De Todos Modos Juan Te Llamas – Marcela Fernández Violante, Adrián Palomeque, and Mitl Valdez Salazar; El Hombre del Puente – Julio Alejandro |
| **Best Original Score**: **Más Negro Que la Noche – Raúl Lavista**; De Todos Modos Juan Te Llamas – Milly Bermejo; El Hombre del Puente – Gustavo César Carrión | **Best Cinematography**: **Actas de Marusia – Jorge Stahl, Jr.**; Canoa – Alex Phillips, Jr.; Coronación – Gabriel Figueroa |
| **Best Film Editing**: **Actas de Marusia – Alberto Valenzuela and Ramón Aupart**; De Todos Modos Juan Te Llamas – Marcelino Aupart; Supervivientes de los Antes – Alfredo Rosas Priego | **Best Set Decoration**: **Coronación – Julio Alejandro**; Actas de Marusia – Raúl Serrano; De Todos Modos Juan Te Llamas – Marcela Fernández Violante |
**Best Documentary Short Subject**: **Tiempo de Correr – Arturo Ripstein**; IV Maratón Náutico del Río Balsas – Demetrio Bilbatúa Rodríguez; Todos Son Mexicanos – Alberto Bojórquez and Óscar Menéndez

== Multiple nominations and awards ==
The following five films received multiple nominations:

| Nominations | Film |
|---|---|
| 12 | Actas de Marusia |
| 10 | De Todos Modos Juan Te Llamas |
| 6 | Canoa |
| 3 | Coronación |
| 2 | El Hombre del Puente |

Films that received multiple awards:

| Awards | Film |
|---|---|
| 9 | Actas de Marusia |
| 2 | De Todos Modos Juan Te Llamas |
