= Enrique Lucero =

Mexican actor (1920–1989)

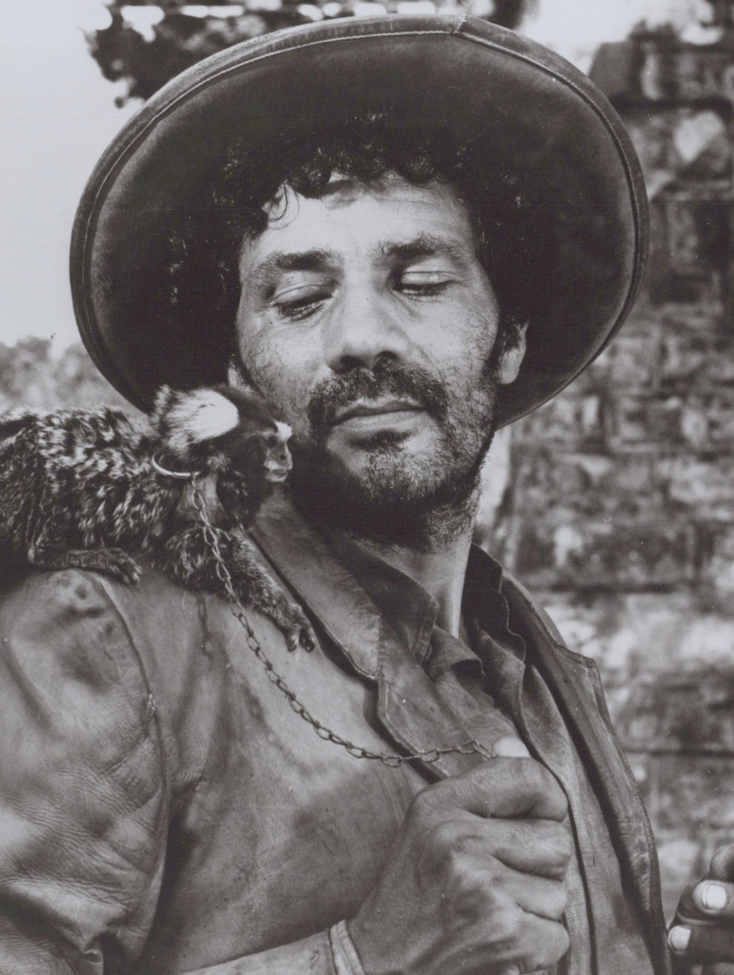
- Lucero in 1971
- Born: Enrique Lucero Granados; October 9, 1920; Chihuahua City, Chihuahua, Mexico
- Died: May 9, 1989 (aged 68); Mexico City, Mexico
- Occupation: Actor
- Spouse: Margarita Escalante Gutiérrez

Enrique Lucero Granados (October 9, 1920 – May 9, 1989) was a Mexican actor, who appeared in over 120 film roles. He was nominated for the Ariel Award for Best Actor for his role in the film Canoa: A Shameful Memory (1976).

== Biography ==
Lucero was born in October 1920 in Chihuahua City, Chihuahua. He made his debut in the 1949 Argentinian film La historia del tango.

He is widely-known for his role as Death in the 1960 Macario, which was the first Mexican film to be nominated for an Oscar for Best Foreign Language Film and is widely regarded by critics and audiences as one of the greatest Mexican films ever made.

He appeared in dozens of both major and minor roles in over 100 films, working with many of the major figures in Mexican cinema, including Cantinflas, Luis Buñuel and René Cardona. He was nominated for the 1976 Ariel Award for Best Actor for his portrayal of Fray Enrique Meza Pérez, the lead perpetrator of the San Miguel Canoa Massacre, in Canoa: A Shameful Memory.

Lucero also appeared in American productions, mostly Westerns and action films shot in Mexico, including The Magnificent Seven (1960), Butch Cassidy and the Sundance Kid (1969), Two Mules for Sister Sara (1970), Sidney Poitier's directorial debut Buck and the Preacher (1972), The Long Goodbye (1973), Eagle's Wing (1979), and Under Fire (1983). He was a favorite of director Sam Peckinpah, who cast him in Major Dundee (1965), The Wild Bunch (1969) and Bring Me the Head of Alfredo Garcia (1974). He played Geronimo in the 1979 miniseries Mr. Horn.

Lucero was married to Margarita Escalante Gutiérrez. He died in Mexico City on May 9, 1988, at the age of 68.

== Selected filmography ==
- La historia del tango (1949) − Ángel Villalva Jr.
- La voz de mi ciudad (1953)
- The Road of Life (1956) − Lic. José Gutiérrez
- Sierra Baron (1958) − Anselmo
- Villa!! (1958) − Tenorio
- Pistolas de oro (1959)
- The Little Savage (1959) − Bit Role (uncredited)
- Beyond All Limits (1959)
- Sonatas (1959) − Militar prisionero
- Bendito entre las mujeres (1959) − (uncredited)
- La Fièvre Monte à El Pao (1959) − Vila (uncredited)
- Macario (1960) − La muerte
- Simitrio (1960) − Papá de Simitrio (uncredited)
- ¡Viva la soldadera! (1960) − (uncredited)
- The Magnificent Seven (1960) − Villager #1
- Rosa Blanca (1961) − Blas Urrutia
- Paraíso escondido (1962)
- La noche del jueves (1962) − Julio
- El tejedor de milagros (1962) − Arnulfo
- The Bloody Vampire (1962) − Lazaro
- The Extra (1962) − Actor, sacerdote azteca
- Tiburoneros (1963) − Rubén
- La invasión de los vampiros (1963) − Lázaro
- Corazón de niño (1963) − Maestro Robles
- El beso de ultratumba (1963) − El vagabundo
- The Curse of the Crying Woman (1963) − Dr. Daniel Jaramillo
- Cri Cri el grillito cantor (1963) − Don Cosme
- Una cara para escapar (1963)
- El revólver sangriento (1964) − Pedro
- The Golden Cockerel (1964) − El Chinaco
- Love Has Many Faces (1965) − Lt. Riccardo Andrade
- Major Dundee (1965) − Doctor Aguilar
- Always Further On (1965) − Brujo Owiruane
- Pistoleros del oeste (1965)
- Los sheriffs de la frontera (1965)
- Pacto de sangre (1966)
- Tarzan and the Valley of Gold (1966) − Perez
- Los mediocres (1966) − Arcadio Buendia (segment "Las Cucarachas")
- El indomable (1966)
- Retablos de la Guadalupana (1967)
- Rocambole contra la secta del escorpión (1967) − Emir Hassan Ali
- La carcachita (1967)
- Traitors of San Angel (1967) − Rodriguez
- The Bandits (1967) − (uncredited)
- Guns for San Sebastian (1968) − Renaldo
- Le Rapace (1968) − El Bosco
- Valentín de la Sierra (1968)
- El caballo Bayo (1969)
- The Wild Bunch (1969) − Ignacio
- Butch Cassidy and the Sundance Kid (1969) − Guard in the 1st Bolivian Bank (uncredited)
- Shark! (1969) − Inspector Barok
- Estafa de amor (1970)
- El despertar del lobo (1970) − Vidente oriental
- Two Mules for Sister Sara (1970) − 3rd American
- La vida inútil de Pito Pérez (1970)
- Los amores de Chucho el Roto (1970)
- Emiliano Zapata (1970) − Jesús Guajardo
- The Bridge in the Jungle (1971) − Perez
- Eye for an Eye (1971) − Lobo
- Something Big (1971) − Indian spy
- Santo contra los cazadores de cabezas (1971) − Husca
- The Wrath of God - Nacho
- Buck and the Preacher (1972) − Indian Chief
- The Revengers (1972) − (uncredited)
- La Scoumoune (1972) − Le Mexicain / Migli
- The Long Goodbye (1973) − Jefe
- Those Years (1973) − Juan Nepomuceno Almonte
- Renzo, el gitano (1973)
- I Escaped from Devil's Island (1973) − Esteban
- Presagio (1974) − Héctor
- La muerte de Pancho Villa (1974)
- Peregrina (1974) − Hermengildo Rodríguez
- Bring Me the Head of Alfredo Garcia (1974) − Esteban
- Mary, Mary, Bloody Mary (1975) − Lieutenant Pons
- The House in the South (1975) − Ramón
- Las fuerzas vivas (1975) − Mateo
- Canoa (1976) − El señor cura
- The Return of a Man Called Horse (1976) − Raven
- La virgen de Guadalupe (1976) − Tío Bernardino
- Las poquianchis (1976) − Capitán
- Maten al león (1977) − Vicepresidente Cardona
- El viaje (1977) − Enrique Jiménez
- Los de abajo (1978)
- The Children of Sanchez (1978)
- Ratero (1979) − Gallo
- La guerra santa (1979) − Rutilo Sandoval
- Guyana: Crime of the Century (1979) − Commune member
- Eagle's Wing (1979) − The Sharman
- Mr. Horn (1979 − Geronimo
- A paso de cojo (1980)
- The Octagon (1980) − One Armed Man
- Green Ice (1981) − Lucho the Coffee Grower
- Ángel del barrio (1981) − Patada (Kick)
- Un hombre llamado el diablo (1983)
- Under Fire (1983) − Prison Priest
- Todo un hombre (1983) − Juvencio
- The Evil That Men Do (1984) − Aristos
- Little Treasure (1985) − Priest
- La revancha (1985)
- El trailer asesino (1986)
- Murieron a la mitad del rio (1986)
- El tres de copas (1986)
- Al filo de la ley: Misión rescate (1986) − Comandante
- Gaby: A True Story (1987) − Minister of Education
- The Last Tunnel (1987) − Juan Penagos
- Treasure of the Moon Goddess (1987) − Tupak
- Los confines (1989) − Tanilo
- El jinete de la divina providencia (1989)
- Mi pistola y tus esposas (1989) − (final film role)
