= 17th Ariel Awards =

1975 Mexican film awards

- Date: 1975

Highlights
- Best Picture: La Choca and La Otra Virginidad
- Most awards: La Choca (6)
- Most nominations: La Choca, La Otra Virginidad, and Presagio (7)

The 17th Ariel Awards ceremony, organized by the Mexican Academy of Film Arts and Sciences (AMACC) took place in 1975, in Mexico City. During the ceremony, AMACC presented the Ariel Award in 13 categories honoring films released in 1974. La Choca, La Otra Virginidad, and Presagio were the most nominated films, and La Choca and La Otra Virginidad tied for Best Picture. Emilio "El Indio" Fernández won for Best Director for La Choca, it was his fourth win in the category, becoming the most awarded director in the category; he held the record for 35 years, until Carlos Carrera tied with four wins in 2010 with the film Backyard: El Traspatio. La Choca was the most awarded film with six accolades; La venida del Rey Olmos and Presagio followed with two wins each.

== Winners and nominees ==
Winners are listed first and highlighted with boldface.

**Best Picture**: **La Choca** – **Estudios Churubusco Azteca**; **La Otra Virginidad** – **STPC**; Presagio – Producciones Escorpión	**Best Director**: **Emilio "El Indio" Fernández** – **La Choca**; Luis Alcoriza – Presagio; Juan Manuel Torres – La Otra Virginidad
**Best Actor**: **Héctor Bonilla** – **Meridiano 100** **as El Rojo**; Ignacio López Tarso – Rapiña; Jorge Martínez de Hoyos – La venida del Rey Olmos as Reynaldo Olmos-Camargo	**Best Actress**: **Pilar Pellicer** – **La Choca** **as La Choca**; Leticia Perdigón – La Otra Virginidad as Eva/Evelina Romero; Isela Vega – Tráinganme la cabeza de Alfredo García as Elita
**Best Supporting Actor**: **Ernesto Gómez Cruz** – **La venida del Rey Olmos** **as The Hairdresser**; Arturo Beristáin – La Otra Virginidad as Luis; Salvador Sánchez – La Choca as Audias	**Best Supporting Actress**: **Mercedes Carreño** – **La Choca** **as Flor**; Anita Blanch – Presagio as Mamá Santos; Rosenda Monteros – Rapiña
**Best Screenplay**: **Presagio – Gabriel García Márquez and Luis Alcoriza**; La Otra Virginidad – Juan Manuel Torres and Luis Alcoriza; El Santo Oficio – Arturo Ripstein and José Emilio Pacheco	**Best Original Story**: **Presagio – Gabriel García Márquez and Luis Alcoriza**; La Otra Virginidad – Juan Manuel Torres; La venida del Rey Olmos – Eduardo Luján and Julián Pastor
**Best Original Score**: **Auandar Anapu – Héctor Sánchez**; La Otra Virginidad – Gustavo César Carrión; La venida del Rey Olmos – Gustavo César Carrión	**Best Cinematography**: **La Choca – Daniel López**; Descenso al País de la Noche – Arturo de la Rosa; Presagio – Gabriel Figueroa
**Best Film Editing**: **La Choca – Jorge Bustos**; Meridiano 100 – Ramón Aupart; Presagio – Carlos Savage	**Best Set Decoration**: **La venida del Rey Olmos – Raúl Serrano**
**Best Documentary Short Subject**: **Contra la razón y por la fuerza – Carlos Ortíz Tejada**; Drenaje Profundo – Carlos Prieto and Ingenieros Civiles Asociados

== Multiple nominations and awards ==
The following six films received multiple nominations:

Nominations	Film
7	La Choca
7	La Otra Virginidad
7	Presagio
5	La venida del Rey Olmos
2	Meridiano 100
2	Rapiña

Films that received multiple awards:

Awards	Film
6	La Choca
2	La venida del Rey Olmos
2	Presagio
