= Diego López Rivera =

Mexican filmmaker (born 1952)

- Born: 21 November 1952 (age 72); Mexico City, Mexico
- Occupation(s): Director, producer, writer
- Years active: 1978–present

Diego López Rivera (21 November 1952) is a Mexican filmmaker. For his film Goitia, Un Dios Para Sí Mismo (1989), López earned the Ariel Award for Best Director and Best Picture.

== Filmography ==
Year	Film	Director	Producer	Writer	Notes
1979	Niebla	Yes	Yes	Yes	Nominated — Ariel Award for Best First Feature Film
1985	Historias Violentas	Yes			Documentary feature
1987	Rogelio Cuellar	Yes			Documentary short
1987	Crónica de Familia	Yes	Yes	Yes	Ariel Award for Best Screenplay; Nominated — Ariel Award for Best Picture; Nominated — Ariel Award for Best Director; Nominated — Ariel Award for Best Original Story
1987	Nuestros Jovenes	Yes		Yes	TV series
1989	Goitia, Un Dios Para Sí Mismo	Yes		Yes	Ariel Award for Best Picture; Ariel Award for Best Director; Ariel Award for Best Original Story
1992	Cuentos de Borges		Yes		TV series
2007	Un Retrato de Diego	Yes		Yes	Documentary feature
2010	The Attempt Dossier		Yes		
