= La Choca =

1974 Mexican drama film

- Directed by: Emilio Fernández
- Written by: Emilio Fernández; Alfonso Díaz Bullard
- Produced by: Emilio Fernández
- Starring: Pilar Pellicer; Gregorio Casal; Mercedes Carreño; Salvador Sánchez
- Cinematography: Daniel López
- Edited by: Jorge Bustos
- Music by: Antonio Díaz Conde
- Production company: CONACINE
- Distributed by: IMCINE; CONACULTA
- Release date: 5 September 1974
- Running time: 94 minutes
- Country: Mexico
- Language: Spanish

La Choca ("The Bump") is a 1974 Mexican drama film directed by Emilio Fernández and starring Pilar Pellicer. It won the Ariel Award for Best Picture at the 17th Ariel Awards in 1975.

== Plot summary ==
In the jungle of Guatemala, La Choca (Pilar Pellicer) is a rude woman trying to resist everything, however, she succumbs in front of the carnal desire for El Guacho (Gregorio Casal), a bandit who killed her husband and attacked her family. Audias (Salvador Sánchez) unsuccessfully tries to rape Flor (Mercedes Carreño), Choca's sister in law. In the following days Flor and El Guacho get involved in a sexual relationship which infuriates Choca, who in retaliation kills Flor, El Guacho and Audias. The film closes with a scene where Choca leaves town with her son in search for a better education for him.

== Cast ==
- Pilar Pellicer as La Choca
- Gregorio Casal as El Guacho
- Juanito Guerra Arellano as Martincito
- Mercedes Carreño as Flor
- Armando Silvestre as Fabiel
- Salvador Sánchez as Audias
- Chano Urueta as Don Pomposo

== Accolades ==
Award	Date of ceremony	Category	Recipients	Result
Ariel Awards	1975	Best Picture	Estudios Churubusco Azteca	Won
Ariel Awards	1975	Best Director	Emilio "El Indio" Fernández	Won
Ariel Awards	1975	Best Actress	Pilar Pellicer	Won
Ariel Awards	1975	Best Supporting Actress	Mercedes Carreño	Won
Ariel Awards	1975	Best Supporting Actor	Salvador Sánchez	Nominated
Ariel Awards	1975	Best Film Editing	Jorge Bustos	Won
Ariel Awards	1975	Best Cinematography	Daniel López	Won
