= Canoa: A Shameful Memory =

1976 film directed by Felipe Cazals

- Criterion Collection DVD cover
- Directed by: Felipe Cazals
- Screenplay by: Tomás Pérez Turrent
- Produced by: Roberto Lozoya
- Cinematography: Álex Phillips Jr.
- Edited by: Rafael Ceballos
- Production company: Conacite Uno; S.T.P.C.
- Distributed by: IMCINE
- Release date: 4 March 1976
- Running time: 115 minutes
- Country: Mexico
- Languages: Spanish; Nahuatl

Canoa: A Shameful Memory (Spanish: Canoa: memoria de un hecho vergonzoso) is a 1976 Mexican docudrama film directed by Felipe Cazals and starring Enrique Lucero, based upon the 1968 San Miguel Canoa massacre.

The film won the Grand Jury Prize at the 26th Berlin International Film Festival and was nominated for five Ariel Awards including for Best Picture and Best Director, and winning one for Best Story. In 1994, the film ranked 14th on the list of the 100 best films of Mexican cinema.

== Plot ==
The film is a dramatic re-enactment of real-life events that took place in 1968 in the small village of San Miguel Canoa in Puebla, Mexico. There, a group of five young employees of the Autonomous University of Puebla intended to spend the night en route to a hike up La Malinche. The group was viciously set upon by villagers who had been manipulated by a local right-wing priest, Enrique Meza Pérez, to believe them to be Communist revolutionaries and deserved lynching.

The film is shot in a documentary style and examines the pervasive atmosphere of repression in the country following wide-spread protests over the government's spending on the 1968 Summer Olympics, eventually leading to a massacre of hundreds of protestors in Mexico City.

== Cast ==
- Enrique Lucero as Enrique Meza Pérez
- Salvador Sánchez as Witness
- Ernesto Gómez Cruz as Lucas García
- Roberto Sosa Sr. as Julián González Báez
- Arturo Alegro as Ramón Calvario Gutiérrez
- Carlos Chávez as Miguel Flores Cruz
- Jaime Garza as Roberto Rojano Aguirre
- Gerardo Vigil as Jesús Carrillo Sánchez
- Rodrigo Puebla as Pedro
- Manuel Ojeda as Townsman
- Malena Doria as Meza Pérez's housekeeper
- Flor Trujillo and María de los Ángeles Rodríguez as Pedro's nieces
- Gastón Melo as Sacristan
- Jorge Fegán as Police captain
- Sergio Calderón as Mayor
- Juan Ángel Martínez as Commissioner
- Alicia del Lago as Alicia
- Guillermo Gil as Army officer
- Juan López Moctezuma as the voice of the narrator

== Production ==
The film was shot in the town of Santa Rita Tlahuapan, Puebla, with Cazals paying 14,000 pesos per week to the town priest to do so.

== Release ==
It was one of the first movies to express the tone of the time of the setting: Mexico 1968, when student turmoils were spread across the country. It was entered into the 26th Berlin International Film Festival, where it won the Silver Bear - Special Jury Prize.

=== Home media ===
A 4K restoration of the film was released on Blu-ray by the Criterion Collection in March 2017.

== Reception ==
On the review aggregator website Rotten Tomatoes, 86% of 7 critics' reviews are positive.

The film was both a critical and a box-office success. Mexican filmmakers Guillermo del Toro and Alfonso Cuarón have praised the film. The film ranked 14th on the list of the 100 best films of Mexican cinema, according to the opinion of 25 film critics and specialists in Mexico, published by Somos magazine in July 1994.
