= Midaq Alley (film) =

1995 Mexican film by Jorge Fons

El Callejón de los Milagros
- El Callejón de los Milagros DVD cover
- Directed by: Jorge Fons
- Written by: Vicente Leñero (screenplay); Naguib Mahfouz (novel)
- Produced by: Alfredo Ripstein hijo
- Starring: Ernesto Gómez Cruz; María Rojo; Salma Hayek; Bruno Bichir; Delia Casanova; Margarita Sanz; Claudio Obregón
- Cinematography: Carlos Marcovich
- Edited by: Carlos Savage hijo
- Music by: Lucía Álvarez
- Distributed by: VIDEOVISA (Mexico and Spain); IFC Films (USA and Australia)
- Release date: 5 May 1995
- Running time: 140 minutes
- Country: Mexico
- Language: Spanish

Midaq Alley (Spanish: El callejón de los milagros, also released as The Alley of Miracles) is a 1995 Mexican film adapted from the novel by Egyptian writer Naguib Mahfouz, written by Vicente Leñero and directed by Jorge Fons. The film deals with complex issues such as gay and lesbian related topics, the lower-middle class of Mexico City, and the lives of many people.

The story is told from three perspectives: Don Ru (Ernesto Gómez Cruz), the owner of a cantina where most of the men in the story gather to drink and play dominoes, Alma (Salma Hayek), the beautiful girl of the neighborhood who dreams of passion, and Susanita (Margarita Sanz who won an Ariel Award for this role), the owner of the apartment complex where Alma and many of the other characters live.

The film was critically acclaimed by international critics. It earned 11 Ariel Awards, including Best Picture at the 37th Ariel Awards and more than 49 international awards and nominations. Pan's Labyrinth and El Callejón de los Milagros were named as the best Mexican films by IMDb and Entertainment Weekly. The film was selected as the Mexican entry for the Best Foreign Language Film at the 68th Academy Awards, but was not accepted as a nominee.

== Plot ==
The lives of the inhabitants of El Callejón de los Milagros, in downtown Mexico City, are as closely knitted as the threads of a rug. Fifty-something Don Ru owns a small "cantina" where all the men spend afternoons playing domino. He's tired of his longtime marriage with Eusebia and has recently discovered new feelings inside his heart. It does not matter if these feelings are not aimed to a young lady but to a young clerk after all, as one of the characters says, "it's platonic love". Don Ru's son Chava does not like what he sees and almost kills his father's lover. Running away from Don Ru's anger, Chava escapes to the US with his friend Abel who is deeply in love with beautiful Alma, the daughter of Doña Cata, a tarot reader with bad luck in love. Susanita, the ugly landlady looking for love; Guicho, Don Ru's cynical employee, Maru, Don Fidel, Doña Flor, Zacarias and mean Jose Luis complete the cast of characters of this complex portrait of lives.

=== Structure ===
The film is divided into four successive and clearly labeled chapters. The first three are named after key individuals, and the fourth wraps up the story. Each chapter starts at the same time, with the same game of dominoes, and describes the same time period, but from the viewpoints of the named people; the chapters tell each person's story. Each chapter thus provides the viewer with details which help to explain things which happened in the other chapters.

1. Rutilio deals with Don Ru's dissatisfaction with his marriage and his poorly hidden homosexual love affair with a young man.
2. Alma deals with Alma's life and Alma’s falling in love with Abel. Abel leaves with Chava for the U.S. and Alma "disappears". Alma has been seduced and Alma ends up in a whorehouse.
3. Susanita is the landlady with horrible teeth whose feelings and romantic hopes are awakened. She marries Guicho.
4. The Return describes the return of Abel and Chava, and Abel's search for Alma. Chava is married and has his wife and baby boy with him. Abel finds Alma in the whorehouse and is heartbroken. He tries to attack her pimp and is stabbed several times. He dies in her arms.

== Cast ==
- Ernesto Gómez Cruz as Rutilio (Don Ru)
- María Rojo as Doña Cata
- Salma Hayek as Alma
- Bruno Bichir as Abel
- Delia Casanova as Eusebia
- Margarita Sanz as Susanita
- Claudio Obregón as Don Fidel
- Juan Manuel Bernal as Chava
- Abel Woolrich as Zacarías
- Luis Felipe Tovar as Güicho
- Daniel Giménez Cacho as José Luis
- Gina Morett as Doña Flor
- Óscar Yoldi as Ubaldo El Poeta ("The poet")
- Esteban Soberanes as Jimy
- Eugenia Leñero as Tina
- Tiaré Scanda as Maru

== Awards and nominations ==
=== Ariel Awards ===
Won:

- Best Film
- Best Direction for Jorge Fons
- Best Actress for Margarita Sanz
- Best Supporting Actor for Luis Felipe Tovar
- Best Costume Design for Jaime Ortiz
- Best Editing for Carlos Savage hijo
- Best Make-Up for Elvia Romero
- Best Original Music Theme or Song for Lucía Álvarez
- Best Original Score for Lucía Álvarez
- Best Production Design for Carlos Gutiérrez
- Best Screenplay for Vicente Leñero

Nominations:

- Best Actor for Ernesto Gómez Cruz
- Best Actor in a Minor Role for Óscar Yoldi
- Best Actress for Salma Hayek
- Best Actress in a Minor Role for Delia Casanova
- Best Actress in a Minor Role for María Rojo
- Best Cinematography for Carlos Marcovich
- Best Set Design for Carlos Gutiérrez
- Best Sound for David Baksht
- Best Supporting Actor for Daniel Giménez Cacho
- Best Supporting Actor for Esteban Soberanes
- Best Supporting Actress for Tiaré Scanda

=== Berlin International Film Festival ===
Wins:

- Special Mention for the exceptional narrative quality

Nominations:

- Golden Bear for Jorge Fons

=== Chicago International Film Festival ===
Wins:

- Audience Choice Award

=== Goya Award ===
Wins:

- Best Spanish Language Foreign Film

=== Gramado Film Festival ===
Wins:

- Best Director for Jorge Fons
- Best Supporting Actress for Margarita Sanz

Nominations:

- Best Latin Film

=== Guadalajara Film Festival ===
Wins:

- Audience Award

=== Havana Film Festival ===
Wins:

- Best Director for Jorge Fons
- Best Screenplay for Vicente Leñero
- Grand Coral (First prize) for Jorge Fons

=== Mexican Cinema Journalists ===
Wins:

- Best Film

=== Paraguay Film Festival ===
Wins:

- Best Actress for Margarita Sanz
- Best Actor for Bruno Bichir

=== Toulouse Latin America Film Festival ===
Wins:

- Special Mention for the distribution of the film

=== Valladolid International Film Festival ===
Wins:

- Best Actor for Bruno Bichir
- Silver Spike for Jorge Fons

Nominations:

- Golden Spike for Jorge Fons

== See also ==
- List of submissions to the 68th Academy Awards for Best Foreign Language Film
- List of Mexican submissions for the Academy Award for Best Foreign Language Film
