= Danzón (film) =

1991 film

- Directed by: María Novaro
- Starring: María Rojo; Carmen Salinas
- Release date: 27 June 1991
- Running time: 120 minutes
- Country: Mexico
- Language: Spanish

Danzón is a 1991 Mexican drama film directed by María Novaro. It follows the story of Julia, a telephone switchboard operator whose main joy is Danzón dancing.

== Plot ==
Julia (María Rojo) is a switchboard operator in Mexico City who lives for her job, her daughter and danzón. She is a strict and expert danzón dancer.

In the last six years, Julia has danced with Carmelo (Daniel Rergis), a tall and silent man, in the Salón Colonia every Wednesday. However, they barely have spoken to each other off the dance floor. One night, Carmelo disappears without a trace. Julia realized how important he became in her life. Lonely and sad, Julia takes a train to Veracruz, where she knows Carmelo has a brother. That trip changes her life, becoming a journey of self-discovering.

== Awards ==
Award	Date of ceremony	Category	Recipients	Result	Refs
Golden Ariel	27 April 1992	Best Picture	María Novaro	Nominated	
Silver Ariel	27 April 1992	Best Director	María Novaro	Nominated	
Silver Ariel	27 April 1992	Best Music Theme	Erando González	Nominated	
Gold Hugo	1991	Best Feature	María Novaro	Nominated	
Film Independent Spirit Awards	27 March 1993	Best Foreign Film	María Novaro	Nominated	
ACE Award		Best Film		Won	
ACE Award		Best Actress	María Rojo	Won	
ACE Award		Best Supporting Actor	Tito Vasconcelos	Won	
ACE Award		Best Supporting Actress	Carmen Salinas	Won	
ACE Award		Best Director	María Novaro	Won	
Valladolid International Film		Best Actress	María Rojo	Won	

== Cast ==
- María Rojo as Julia Solórzano
- Carmen Salinas as Doña Tí
