= Marcela Fernández Violante =

Mexican filmmaker (born 1941)

- Born: September 6, 1941 (age 84); Mexico City, Distrito Federal, Mexico
- Occupation(s): Filmmaker, Director
- Notable work: Cananea, Misterio, The Generals Daughter, Acosada, Frida Kahlo

Marcela Fernández Violante (born June 9, 1941) is a Mexican filmmaker and director. She is a graduate of the University Centre for Cinematographic Studies (CUEC), where she specialized in scripting and direction. Upon graduation from CUEC, Violante participated in the documentary about Mexican artist Frida Kahlo, which won an Ariel Award for “Best Documentary".

== Early life ==
Violante was born to a military family, with her father serving as a general in the military. Violante participated as a student in the filming of the documentary El grito (the scream), by director Leobardo López Aretche on the events that culminate the tragedy of the events that happened in Tlatelolco on October 2, 1968. On October 2, 2018, it was announced that a remastered version of this film would be shown at FICM.

== Career ==
=== Frida Kahlo documentary ===
Violante participated in making the documentary Frida Kahlo based on the work of the Mexican painter. She was the first woman to address the topic of Frida Kahlo . This documentary won the Diosa de Plata, or Silver Goddess Award, and an Ariel award for best debut opera, as well as the prize for the best short film at the Guadalajara film festival in 1973. It won the special jury prize at the London festival in 1974, and was exhibited at the Solomon R. Guggenheim Museum in New York later that year. In 1974, Violante began filming De todos modos Juan te llamas (Anyway, Juan is your name), the first feature film to be produced by UNAM. The film deals with the topic of the Cristero War in the Mexican Shoal in 1927, and the consolidation of the PRI as the ruling party.

Under the policy of freedom of expression in cinema, president Luis Echeverría agreed that the film could be commercially exhibited even though it severely criticized the Catholic Church and the Mexican Army. The film appeared at an exhibition in a New York film festival in 1976 and at the Havana film festival later in December.

=== 1974 – 2019 Back to CUEC ===
In 1974, Violante became a professor of scriptwriting and filmmaking subjects of CUEC. She became a director there from 1984 to 1988. According to El Universal, in 1980 she expelled Alfonso Cuarón from CUEC, finding his documentary Vengeance is mine to be pretentious. Violante collaborated as a speaker at universities such Loyola in New Orleans, UCLA in California and NYU in New York. She is the General Secretary of the Union of Film Production Workers of the Mexican Republic (STPC), a member of the General Society of Writers of Mexico (SOGEM), and President of the Matilde Landeta cultural association.

== Filmography ==
- La Pelota (fiction short film)
- La Perse (fiction short film)
- Gayoso gives discounts (fiction short film)
- Frida Kahlo (documentary short film) 1972
- The General's Daughter (De todos modos Juan te llamas) (1974)
- Cananea (1978)
- Misterio (1980)
- El niño raramuri (1980)
- Matilde Landeta, pioneer of the national cinema Television program (1982)
- Nocturnal love you leave (1987)
- Lucky Strike (1992)
- Entangling shadows (episode "Present body", 1998)
- Harassed (2002)
