= Misterio =

- Mexican theatrical release poster
- Directed by: Marcela Fernández Violante
- Screenplay by: Vicente Leñero
- Starring: Helena Rojo; Juan Ferrara; Víctor Junco; Beatríz Sheridan
- Cinematography: Daniel López
- Edited by: Jorge Bustos
- Music by: Leonardo Velázquez
- Release date: November 30, 1980 (Mexico City)
- Running time: 90 minutes
- Country: Mexico
- Language: Spanish

Misterio (Mystery) is a 1980 Mexican thriller film, directed and written by Marcela Fernández Violante. The film stars Juan Ferrara, as a TV star who blurs reality with the plot of the soap opera he is shooting. Helena Rojo plays Silvia, his co-star, while Víctor Junco is the TV director and Beatríz Sheridan is the screenwriter. Misterio is adapted from a novel written by Vicente Leñero, who adapted it for the screen. The film received eight Ariel Awards in 1980, including Best Actor (Ferrara), Best Actress (Rojo), Best Supporting Actor (Junco), and Best Supporting Actress (Sheridan).

== Cast ==
- Juan Ferrara as Alex
- Helena Rojo as Silvia
- Víctor Junco as soap opera director
- Beatriz Sheridan as Gladys
- Ramón Menéndez as camera director
- Jorge Fegán as executive producer
- Leticia Perdigón as María Luisa

== Awards ==
=== Ariel Awards ===
The Ariel Awards are awarded annually by the Mexican Academy of Film Arts and Sciences in Mexico. Misterio received eight awards out of 12 nominations.

Year	Nominee / work	Award	Result
23rd Ariel Awards
23rd Ariel Awards	Marcela Fernández Violante	Best Direction	Nominated
23rd Ariel Awards	Juan Ferrara	Best Actor	Won
23rd Ariel Awards	Helena Rojo	Best Actress	Won
23rd Ariel Awards	Víctor Junco	Best Supporting Actor	Won
23rd Ariel Awards	Beatriz Sheridan	Best Supporting Actress	Won
23rd Ariel Awards	Vicente Leñero	Best Screenplay	Won
23rd Ariel Awards	Vicente Leñero	Best Original Story	Won
23rd Ariel Awards	Daniel López	Best Cinematography	Nominated
23rd Ariel Awards	Jorge Bustos	Best Editing	Won
23rd Ariel Awards	Leonardo Velázquez	Best Original Score	Nominated
23rd Ariel Awards	Rafael Suárez	Best Art Direction	Nominated
23rd Ariel Awards	Xavier Rodríguez	Best Set Decoration	Won
