= The Bricklayers =

1976 film

- Directed by: Jorge Fons
- Written by: Vicente Leñero
- Starring: Ignacio López Tarso
- Cinematography: Álex Phillips Jr.
- Release date: 23 December 1976
- Running time: 122 minutes
- Country: Mexico
- Language: Spanish

The Bricklayers (Spanish: Los albañiles) is a 1976 Mexican drama film directed by Jorge Fons. It was entered into the 27th Berlin International Film Festival where it won the Silver Bear.

== Cast ==
- Ignacio López Tarso - Don Jesús
- Jaime Fernández - Pérez Gómez
- José Alonso - Federico
- Salvador Sánchez - Chapo Álvarez
- José Carlos Ruiz - Jacinto Martínez
- Katy Jurado - Josefina
- Adalberto Martínez - Patotas
- Salvador Garcini - Sergio García
- José Luis Flores - Isidro
- Yara Patricia - Celerina (as Yara Patricia Palomino)
- Eduardo Cassab - Munguía
- Guillermo Gil - Valverde
- Ramón Menéndez - Policía Dávila
- Yolanda Rigel - Secretaria
- Gerardo Zepeda - Marcial
- Mario García González - Delegado
- David Silva - Ing. Zamora
