= Pilar Pellicer =

Mexican actress (1938–2020)

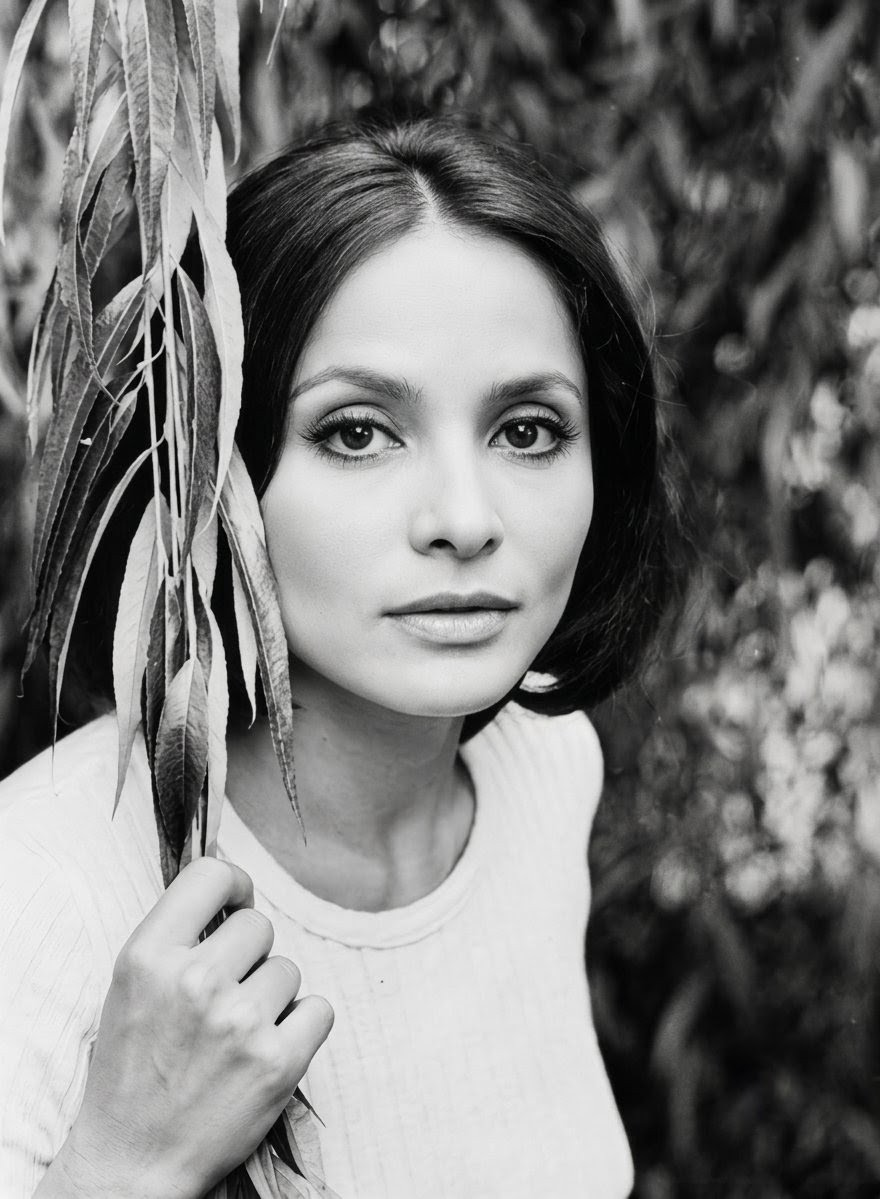
- Pellicer in the 1960s
- Born: María del Pilar Pellicer López de Llergo; 12 February 1938; Mexico City, Mexico
- Died: 16 May 2020 (aged 82); Mexico City, Mexico
- Burial place: Panteón Francés
- Occupation: Actress
- Years active: 1950–2018
- Spouse: James Metcalf
- Children: Ariane Pellicer
- Parent(s): María del Pilar López de Llergo; César Pellicer Sánchez
- Relatives: Pina Pellicer (sister); Ana Pellicer (sister); Carlos Pellicer (uncle)

María del Pilar Pellicer López de Llergo (12 February 1938 – 16 May 2020) was a Mexican actress. At the 17th Ariel Awards, she won the Ariel Award for Best Actress for her performance in the film La Choca (1974).

== Biography ==
Pilar was daughter of lawyer César Pellicer Sánchez and wife María del Pilar López de Llergo, both from Tabasco.

At age 18, Pilar studied at the Academy of Contemporary Dance, and was trained by Seki Sano. Pilar later abandoned dance to study philosophy at the National Autonomous University of Mexico. She also studied at the Instituto Nacional de Bellas Artes y Literatura. She debuted as an actress in the movie El vendedor de muñecas in 1955.

== Death ==
Pellicer died from COVID-19 on 16 May 2020, at age 82, during the COVID-19 pandemic in Mexico.

== Selected filmography ==
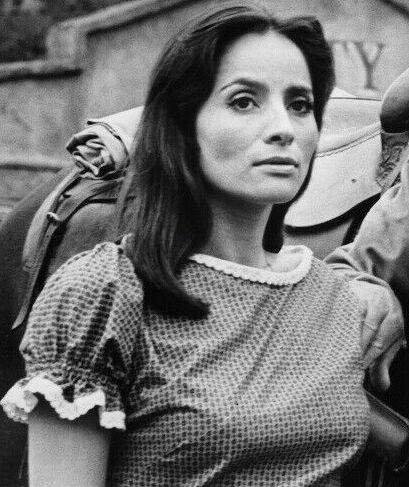
Pellicer in Day of the Evil Gun (1968)

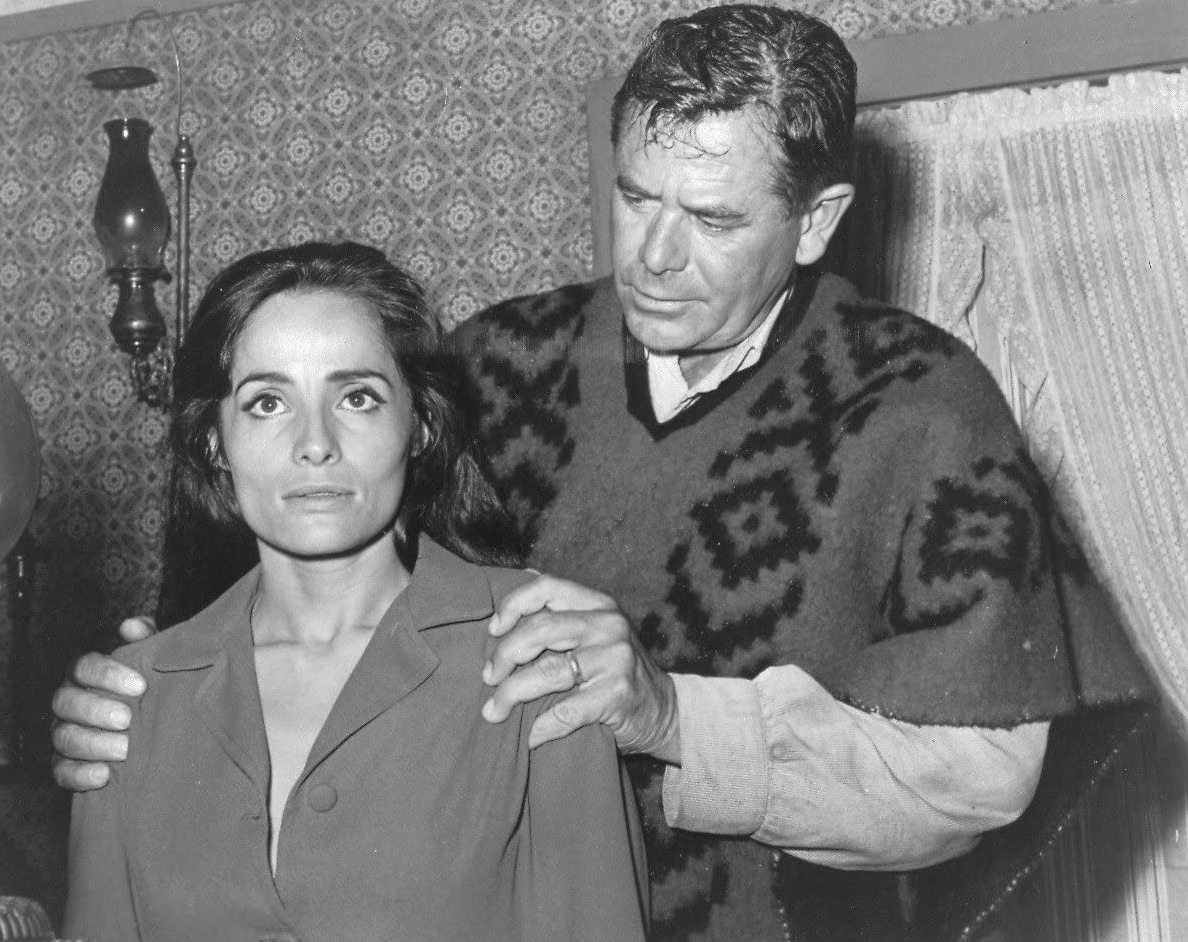
Pellicer with Glenn Ford in 1968

- El vendedor de muñecas (1955)
- The Life of Agustín Lara (1959) - Admiradora joven
- Nazarín (1959) - Lucía (uncredited)
- Escuela de verano (1959) - Magdalena Dávila
- La Fièvre Monte à El Pao (1959) - Pilar Cárdenas (uncredited)
- Quinceañera (1960) - Olivia
- El gángster (1965) - (uncredited)
- Tajimara (1965) - Cecilia
- Pedro Páramo (1967) - Susana San Juan
- The Bandits (1967) - (uncredited)
- Day of the Evil Gun (1968) - Lydia Yearby
- Las visitaciones del diablo (1968) - Paloma
- Los amigos (1968)
- Santa (1969)
- La trinchera (1969)
- ¿Porque nací mujer? (1970) - Josefa
- El mundo del los muertos (1970) - Doña Damiana Velazquez / Alicia
- Siempre hay una primera vez (1971) - (segment "Isabel")
- Una mujer honesta (1972)
- Los perturbados (1972) - (segment "La Búsqueda)
- Manuel Saldivar, el texano (1972)
- El festin de la loba (1972) - Gloria
- La Choca (1974) - La Choca
- Las Poquianchis (1976) - Santa
- Balún Canán (1977) - Matilde
- El mexicano (1977)
- Los amantes frios (1978) - Jacinta (segment "El difunto al pozo y la viuda al gozo")
- Las del talon (1978)
- Tres mujeres en la hoguera (1979) - Mané
- Cadena perpetua (1979) - Mujer de Pantoja
- Las golfas del talón (1979)
- Rigo es amor (1980) - La Tulipana
- Con la muerte en ancas (1980) - Madre de Casey
- Zorro, the Gay Blade (1981) - Don Francisco's Wife
- Las Siete Cucas (1981)
- Showdown at Eagle Gap (1982) - Señora Romero
- Dulce espiritu (1986)
- Amor a la vuelta de la esquina (1986)
- Un asesino anda suelto (1991)
- Marea suave (1992)
- Playa azul (1992) - Señora
- El ocaso del cazador (2017) - (final film role)

=== TV ===
- El Camino Secreto (1986–1987) - Yolanda
- Muchachitas (1991) - Martha Sánchez-Zúñiga de Cantú
- Huracán (1997–1998) - Ada Vargas Lugo
- Primer amor... a mil por hora (2000–2001) - La Chonta
- Sin pecado concebido (2001) - Loló de la Barcena
- La Madrastra (2005) - Sonia
- Mujeres Asesinas 3 (2010, Episode: "Las Cotuchas, empresarias") - Amparo Quezada
- Triunfo del Amor (2010–2011) - Eva Grez
- Como dice el dicho (2012–2013) - Dalia / Gertrudis
- La Gata (2014) - Doña Rita Olea Pérez

== Bibliography ==
- Agrasánchez Jr., Rogelio (2001). Bellezas del cine mexicano/Beauties of Mexican Cinema. Archivo Fílmico Agrasánchez. ISBN 968-5077-11-8.
