= Raúl Kamffer =

Raúl Kammfer
- Born: 16 April 1929; Mexico City, Mexico
- Died: 19 May 1987 (aged 58); Mexico City, Mexico
- Occupation(s): Director, producer, cinematographer, editor, screenwriter
- Years active: 1967–1981

Raúl Kamffer Cardoso (16 Abril 1929 – 19 May 1987) was a Mexican filmmaker. For his film 'Ora Sí ¡Tenemos Que Ganar! (1981), Kamffer earned the Ariel Award for Best Director and Best Picture.

== Biography ==
Raúl Kamffer studied film production in Italy, at the Centro Experimental de Cinematografía de Roma. Back in Mexico, he was part of the first generation of the Centro Universitario de Estudios Cinematográficos. In 1968, he shot his first short film Fiesta de muertos, followed the following year by his first feature film Mictlán o la casa de los que ya no son.

His 1978 film ¡Ora sí tenemos que ganar! won 4 Ariel Awards in 1982.

== Filmography ==
Year	Film	Director	Producer	Writer	Notes
1967	Preparatoria 100 años	Yes		Yes	Short film
1968	Fiesta de Muertos	Yes			Documentary film
1968	Mural Efimero	Yes			Short film
1969	Ana y Diana	Yes	Yes		Short film
1969	Mictlan o La Casa de los Que Ya No Son	Yes	Yes		23rd Cannes Film Festival (Out of competition)
1970	El Juego de Zuzanka	Yes			
1971	Semana Santa entre Los Coras		Yes		Documentary
1975	Energomex	Yes		Yes	Short film
1976	El Perro y la Calentura	Yes		Yes	
1979	Parto Solar 5	Yes	Yes	Yes	
1981	'Ora Sí ¡Tenemos Que Ganar!	Yes		Yes	Ariel Award for Best Picture; Ariel Award for Best Director; Nominated — Ariel Award for Best Screenplay
