= Without a Trace (2000 film) =

2000 Mexican drama film

- Spanish: Sin Dejar Huella
- Directed by: Maria Novaro
- Written by: Maria Novaro
- Cinematography: Serguei Saldívar Tanaka
- Edited by: Ángel Hernández Zoido
- Music by: Lynn Fainchtein; Herminio Gutiérrez
- Release date: 2000
- Country: Mexico
- Language: Spanish

Without a Trace (Spanish: Sin Dejar Huella, also known as Leaving No Trace) is a 2000 Mexican film directed by Maria Novaro and starring Tiaré Scanda, Aitana Sánchez-Gijón, Jesús Ochoa, José Sefamí, Martín Altomaro, Juan Manuel Bernal and Walberto Goldstein. The film follows Ana, a fake Mayan art smuggler, and Aurelia, a maquiladora worker, flee from Ciudad Juárez, Chihuahua in Northern Mexico and those who pursue them to Cancún in the Yucatán peninsula province of Quintana Roo. The two women fight, murder, run, and become an odd couple of friends as they run from the Federales and an ex-boyfriend narcotics trafficker.
