= La venida del Rey Olmos =

- Directed by: Julián Pastor
- Written by: Eduardo Luján
- Produced by: Conacine, S.A. de C.V
- Starring: Jorge Martínez de Hoyos, Ana Luisa Peluffo, Maritza Olivares
- Cinematography: José Ortiz Ramos
- Edited by: José W. Bustos
- Music by: Gustavo César Carrión
- Release date: September 11, 1975
- Running time: 90 minutes
- Country: Mexico
- Language: Spanish

La venida del Rey Olmos (The Coming of King Elms) is a 1975 Mexican film written by Eduardo Luján and directed by Julián Pastor.

After returning from the small Mexican town of Dublán, Chihuahua, a 20th-century Son of the Father creates a new Church in the outskirts of Mexico City.

== Plot ==
The film is set in 1958 in the fictitious north-Mexican town of Dublán in the state of Chihuahua, 1,148 miles (1,848 kilometers) north of Mexico City and 132 miles (213 kilometers) south of El Paso, Texas. Reynaldo Olmos travels there to start a new, Christian life after leaving his wife Chabela and their son in Mexico City. Their son dies of dysentery shortly after his departure and Chabela is forced to work as a prostitute at La Sirena, a brothel. Reynaldo and Chabela had lived in a poor district of San Cayetano on the outskirts of Mexico City, where the streets are unpaved and making simple bricks (ladrilleras) is the main economic activity.

It is the sixth anniversary of the Mexican presidency of Adolfo Ruiz Cortines. A man, Venustiano Negrón, is shown reading El Nacional (México); an eight-column headline mentions Ruiz Cortines. A black man says, "Because I am a black, I may not be baptized or take communion; I must await the Millennium, the Third Age, when our Lord returns to Earth to lift the curse of our color." A sign in a temple in Colonia San Cayetano, on the outskirts of Mexico City, says: "Todos somos iguales, hasta los negros" ("We all are equal, even the blacks").

Reynaldo goes to Dublán in search of a new life. Joining a Christian sect, he is baptized in a river by Brother Donald. Reynaldo takes a train to Mexico City to start a new congregation of the sect and says an emotional goodbye to Donald, with whom he has a father-son relationship.

In Mexico City, Reynaldo believes that he has divine powers. He finds his godfather and a friend, who quit his factory job and opened a small barber shop. Reynaldo asks him about Chabela; the barber tells him that Chabela has become a prostitute, and takes him to the brothel.

Reynaldo begins drinking with his barber friend and Chabela, and takes them out of La Sirena into the unpaved street. He undresses his ex-wife, anointing her with water to heal her as dogs bark in the distance.

Reynaldo establishes a spiritual doctor's office in part of the barber shop. His friend hangs up a sign in front, reading: "Doctor Reynaldo Olmos, graduado en Estados Unidos y en el E. Santo. Por la Gracia Suprema de los Tres, R. O. 666-2" ("Doctor Reynaldo Olmos, a graduate from the United States and the Holy Spirit. By the Supreme Grace of the Trinity, R. O. [his initials] 666-2").

Venustiano Negrón appears, saying that he is the wealthy owner of the brickworks, and tries to seduce his young, pretty sister-in-law Martina. Reynaldo (now known as King Elms, the self-proclaimed Son of the Father), has shortened his name to Rey (King) and wears a purple chasuble—similar to that worn by a Catholic priest—on which Chabela has sewn a square piece of white cloth reading, "Yo Rey Olmos, Soy E. Santo" ("I, King Elms, Am the Holy Spirit"). He seduces Martina instead, saying: "Tell your boss that whoever denies me before men, I also will deny them before my Holy Father, who is in heaven"; and "You will be anointed with the sacred oil that has been blessed by the Holy Ghost", and "My daughter, your faith has healed you, 'Talitha Kumi',* which is the same as 'get up, girl', it is my will and my command." Money and power struggles develop between Rey Olmos and Negrón ("Don Venus").

Rey and some friends are invited to a party at a bathhouse-brothel by Don Venus. He organizes a strike against Negrón's brickworks before accepting a $5,000 a bribe to call it off the strike, saying that he will invest the money in a new temple.

Martina shoots Rey to death at the door of the church, expecting that he will go to heaven with his Father before returning to earth. Chabela, Rey's barber friend, and Martina's ex-boyfriend, Juan, agree that the men should throw Rey's body into a nearby channel.

When Chabela opens Rey's coffin the next day, he has apparently risen from the dead and ascended into heaven. Rey leaves a guitar to his congregation; Chabela delivers it to a one-eyed guitarist, the sect's new leader.

== Cast and crew ==
- Jorge Martínez de Hoyos as Reynaldo Olmos-Camargo
- Ana Luisa Peluffo as Chabela (affectionate name for Isabel)
- Maritza Olivares as Martina
- Ernesto Gómez-Cruz as the one-eyed hairdresser, singer and guitarist
- Mario García-González
- Max Kerlow as preacher Hermano Donald (Brother Donald)
- Gastón Melo
- Roberto "Flaco" ("Skinny") Guzmán
- Gloria Mestre
- María Prado
- Marta Zamora
- Aurora Alonso
- Juan Ángel Martínez
- Lina Montes
- Paloma Zozaya
- Marcelo Villamil
- Production design: Alberto Ladrón de Guevara
- Set decoration: Raúl Serrano

== Songs ==
- "Roca de la Eternidad" ("Rock of Ages"), by August Montague and Thomas Hastings
- "Dos almas" ("Two Souls"), by Fabián
- "Aventurera" ("Adventuress"), by Agustín Lara
- "Virgen de medianoche" ("Midnight Virgin"), by Pedro Galindo
- "La flauta de Bartolo" ("Bartolo's Flute"), by Joe Quijano
- "El dulce taconeo de tus pisadas" ("Your Soft Footsteps") by Juan Ángel Martínez

== Production ==
The film was shot in Mexico by Churubusco Studios at the outskirts of Mexico City, Ixmiquilpan, and Xochimilco.
