= Miguel Peraza =

Mexican self-taught sculptor (born 1959)

- Born: Miguel Peraza Menendez; September 29, 1959; Mexico City, Mexico
- Education: Andrés Peraza (father)
- Known for: Sculpture, drawing, printmaking
- Awards: Ariel, Race for the Universe

Miguel Peraza (born September 29, 1959) is a Mexican self-taught sculptor. His production consists of about 300 works of small format and 34 monumental works, with many monuments along Mexico and Colombia, mainly in universities. Throughout his career he has demonstrated mastery of materials, regardless of the size of his sculptures, and covering many topics.

== Life and work ==
Peraza was born in Mexico City. His first sculpture was made back in 1975. Since then, he has carved in different sizes and materials, such as bronze, marble, wood, stainless steel, and others.

He has participated in 28 individual and 2 group exhibitions, displaying his sculptural proposal in several countries such as Colombia, Chile, Costa Rica, United States, France, Belgium, Netherlands, and Mexico.

Throughout his life he has gathered his artistic expression, teachings and publishing.

He has lectured more than 5 conferences in the United States, Colombia, Costa Rica, Chile, and Mexico.

He is a specialist in the following subjects: The Art of Art Marketing, Problems of Space, Theory of Color, as well as the Treatment and History of Sculpture.

His career has developed intimately with universities. One of his main concerns is to show the importance of art in higher education by proposing to include it as part of the occupational skills and technique

== Publications ==
He is co-author of "The Art of Art Marketing" (Editorial Plus, 1990).
