= Mitl Valdez =

Mexican filmmaker (born 1949)

Mitl Valdez (born 1949) is a Mexican filmmaker.

Valdez was born in Mexico City. He studied cinematography at CUEC (Centro Universitario de Estudios Cinematográficos), which he later directed from 1997 to 2004. He is best known for films such as Los confines (1987) and Los vuelcos del corazón (1996); the latter was chosen as one of the 100 Greatest Mexican Films by Somos magazine in 1994.
