= La historia del tango =

- Directed by: Manuel Romero
- Release date: 1949
- Country: Argentina
- Language: Spanish

La historia del tango is a 1949 film of the classical era of Argentine cinema.

== Plot ==
The director of a tango band is in love with his singer, but she marries another man who later abandons her. Now old, their children will fulfill their dreams.
