= Josefina Vicens =

Mexican author, screenwriter, and journalist (1911–1988)

Josefina Vicens

Josefina Vicens (also referred to by her nickname, La Peque, 23 November 1911 – 22 November 1988) was a Mexican author, screenwriter, and journalist. She is considered to be one of Mexico's seminal women writers. She is best known for her two novels, El libro vacío (‘The empty book;’ published first in Spanish in 1958 and in English in 1992) and Los años falsos (‘The false years;’ first published in Spanish in 1982 and in English in 1989) and for her pioneering contributions to twentieth-century Mexican politics and political thought through her activism and journalism. She also authored several screenplays, many of which were produced and released as widely viewed films. She was born in Villahermosa, Tabasco state but lived most of her adult life in Mexico City.

El libro vacio (The Empty Book) was the first Mexican meta-literary novel, using the resources of the "Nouveau Roman". It was awarded the Xavier Villarrutia Prize in 1958. It has recently been selected by the National Commission of Mexico for UNESCO's Literature & Translation project.

== Early life ==
Vicens was born during the Mexican revolution and grew up in Villahermosa, Tabasco. Her father was Spanish, her mother Mexican. Her father was a small shop owner, her mother a primary school teacher. They had 5 daughters, including Josefina. The Vicens family lived on a farm throughout Vicens’ earliest years. They were staunch Catholics.

The family was very musical, and her mother kept a notebook of poetry and song lyrics; perhaps this influenced Vicens’ own appreciation for writing.

In the early 1920s, the Vicens family moved to Mexico City and settled in the prosperous Colonia Roma neighborhood. Here, Vicens’ parents opened a store, where they worked. It fell to Vicens and the other older daughters to care for their younger sisters while their parents were at work. Vicens studied at a business school after finishing grade school; there, she learned shorthand and typing. Later, she would support herself off of the skills she learned in school, gaining her independence in an era when women were just beginning to gain suffrage but did not usually hold influential roles outside the home. Independence was very important to Vicens, who saw the ability to support herself as a potential escape from the confines of her family's household.

After the family settled in Mexico City, Vicens’ father started working for a hot sauce manufacturing company of which he later became the owner. When she was still in her early teens, Vicens began to work at the factory with her father. There, Vicens perceived great inequality between the managers of the factory, including her father, and its workers, causing conflict for her. In the mid-twenties, she left the factory and her family, and went for a time to Chapultepec. There, she found work at an auto-transport company. She would return to her family and in 1925 she found work at a psychiatric hospital as a secretary, where she would remain for a year and a half. She agreed to work at the hospital only if, she recounted later in an interview, the director would let her speak to patients after she had finished her secretarial tasks for the day. It is likely that this experience helped to inform many of the major themes in her written work, including a particular fascination with “life and death, insanity and sanity.”

After working at the hospital, Vicens found work at the Department of Agriculture. There, she was known for her humor, and she caught the attention of her supervisor. This was also where she, singled out because she was the youngest worker in the division, earned the nickname “La Peque.”

In 1938, she was chosen to be the Secretary for Women's Action of the National Confederation of Farmers. Thus began her life in politics. It was a political life defined, as she put it, “by a rebellious fight for social justice.”

Influenced by her experiences with inequality at earlier jobs, including her work at her father's factory, Vicens used her position at the National Confederation of Farmers to fight for farmers’ rights. She worked, in particular, to promote women's rights in that sector. Also in 1938, she became the head of the Women's Section of the Agricultural Sector of the Mexican Revolutionary Party. She would hold those two positions simultaneously.

Art formed an important part of this struggle, and she allied with some artists who were her contemporaries in order to advocate for social justice, including: Juan Soriano, Antonio Peláez, and Ramón Gaya. She was surrounded by artists and writers even when she was in politics.

In 1937, Vicens married Jose Ferrel. Ferrel was widely believed to be homosexual by those in his social circle, and while the marriage surprised many acquaintances for that reason, Vicens and Ferrel were close friends. By marrying, Vicens was finally able to move out of her parents’ house, thus gaining the independence that she had so desired from her family. Her life was to continue to be defined by her desire for independence and her fierce individuality.

In 1938, Vicens published for the first time, releasing a collection of her thoughts on politics. This marked the start of her writing career, but her most important publications would not be made until the fifties.

== Later life and death ==
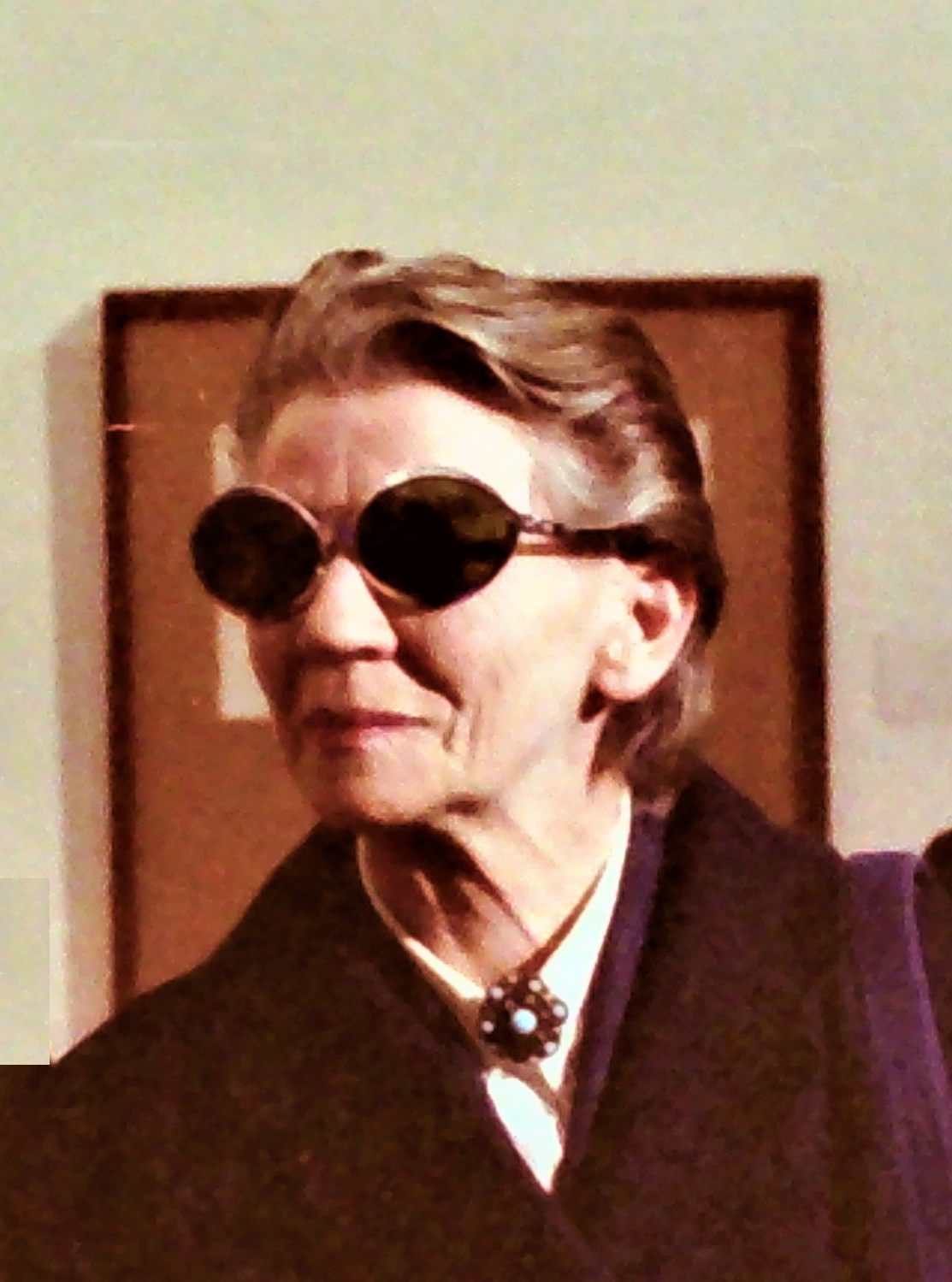
Josefina Vicens

Throughout the 1940s, Vicens dedicated herself to her writing and political activism, authoring articles about Mexico's oil trade and Mexico's international relations while also covering bullfights for a local paper under the pen name Pepe Faroles.

In 1946, Vicens transitioned to screenwriting, and in 1948, she completed her first script, Aviso de ocasion, which was never adapted to the screen. She worked with Gabriel Figueroa, the famous Mexican cinematographer.

In 1958, Vicens published her first novel, El libro vacío, which she began writing 10 years prior. She spent years writing and editing the novel before its publication, and it was met with critical success. Because of her already active political life and screenplay writing, her novel came as a surprise, and was considered to be evidence of a secret passion. She continued to write a multitude of screenplays through the 1960s.

Vicens fought for the rights of screenwriters, as well as for opportunities for new screenwriters to develop and innovate. From 1970 to 1976, Vicens served as president of the Mexican Academy of Cinematographic Sciences and Arts. In 1973, Los perros de dios, a film written by Vicens, won the Ariel Award for Best Screenplay, and Renuncia por motivos de salud won two years later. In 1979, she wrote her last screenplay, El testamento, and in 1982 she published her second and final book, Los años falsos. Around this time, she began to lose her vision, and was therefore distanced from the social life she had maintained. She lamented the loss of vision in an interview, calling it a tragedy because she could no longer read and also lost her independence.

Josefina Vicens died on November 22, 1988, just one day short of her 77th birthday. In one of a series of interviews conducted in 1987 and 1988, Vicens expressed that she hoped to feel her death, as she wanted to be conscious of this transit from life to death.

== Literature ==
Vicens wrote two works of fiction, which each feature male protagonists and are largely introspective. These novels are considered to be important works in the history of Mexican literature.

Josefina Vicens fully developed her writings in the 1950s, the decade in which Mexico City became the center of modernity in the country, where many intellectuals and artists met and collaborated. Both the studies and influences of the period were very diverse: Los poetos malditos, surrealism, French existentialism, the philosophy of Nietzsche, etc. Many studies consider Vicens’ marriage and solid friendship with Jose Ferrel and authors like RImbaud and Gide to be her point of contact with the group of los Contemporáneos. She also formed friendships with many artists and painters like Pedro Coronel, Juan Soriano, José Luis Cuevas and Antonio Peláez, as well as writers like Sergio Fernández, Pita amor, Edmundo Valadés, Octavio Paz and Juan Rulfo. This interaction with renowned artists was linked to her visits to café París, which was a common meeting space for many artists of the age.

=== El libro vacio (1958) ===
El libro vacío (transl. The Empty Book David Lauer, University of Texas Press (1992), ISBN 0-292-72067-X) won the Villaurutia prize for literature. The novel follows José García as he struggles with his inability to write. The book, a work of metafiction, addresses the struggle to express universal ideas while living in what José considers a mediocre life. He writes of the tension between imagination and real life, unsure how to reconcile his desire for truth with his search for a compelling story. He lives with his two sons and wife, whom he refers to as “his woman” (“mi mujer”) throughout the book. As he goes about his normal life, he reflects upon past sexual relations, his childhood, and the growth of his two sons.

In a 1986 interview with Vicens, she describes the problem of whether to write as something she struggles with just as much as her protagonist. She explains that the title was the first thing she wrote, deciding on the theme of emptiness before starting the book.

=== Los años falsos (1981) ===
Los años falsos (English: The false years trans. Peter Earle, Latin American Literary Review Press (1989), ISBN 0-935480-40-4 – reviewed at ) was published in 1982. It follows 19-year-old protagonist Luis Alfonso Fernandez Jr. as he stands at the grave of his father, who died years earlier when he accidentally shot himself. Luis reflects on his life, probing into his personality and his desire to be independent from his father. Through this reflection on the clash of generations, Vicens criticizes Mexico's political corruption and the lasting influence of familial traditions on contemporary life.

== Screenplays ==
Josefina Vicens has been quoted as saying that she made her living off of her screenplays, even if perhaps her novels are better known in translation. Both of her novels have been translated into English; The empty book in the nineties and The False Years in the eighties and remain in distribution. Her career in film got its start when she worked for a time as the head of the Mexican Cinematography Production Union. There, she learned the screenwriters’ craft, picking up skills from popular and art film writers that would inform her own work. After she completed her term at its helm, she stayed on at the union as a scriptwriter herself. Later, she took charge of the Academy of the Mexican Cinematographic Arts and Sciences.

Vicens’ first successful film was released in 1954, when she found commercial success in her script for El rival (“The Rival”). Her career as a scriptwriter would take off from there, and she produced screenplays prolifically from then on. Her early films mirrored and to a certain extent were constrained by the conservatism of popular Mexican film in the mid-twentieth century. Many of her early films were about Mexican family life: wives, children, and family drama.

Her first screenplay to be considered to the one that broke out from that mold and defined her unique style was Las señoras vivanco (“The ladies vivanco”). Her screenplays were considered unique in their originality; in those days, most scripts were commissioned by production companies and so Vicens’ stood out because she wrote them without being paid to do so. Some of her most well-known films include Los perros de dios (“The dogs of God”), renuncia por motivos de salud (“To renounce for health reasons”), and el testamento (“The will”). These films addressed political or surrealist themes, and tackled weighty issues about identity, self-definition, and mortality that also appeared in her novels. However, Vicens was probably better-known for her films than her novels in Mexico, as they reached a higher audience, although English-language speakers know her novels better for their translations.

Her screenplays were the most popular of her productions during her lifetime, and Vicens would recount that she had written more than ninety scripts. However, according to her, she was proudest of her novels, and wanted to be considered an author and not a screenwriter.

Vicens' many scripts include two that were nominated for the Ariel Award, Mexico's top film award.

- Renuncia por motivos de salud (1976)
- Los Perros de Dios (1974)

== Journalism ==
When Vicens accompanied her father on his first return trip to Spain after 20 years, she was intrigued by the bullfighting scene she found there. She began covering the fights for a local paper under the pen name Pepe Faroles in the early 1940s. After writing insultingly about a prominent bullfighter, she was not welcomed to publish more articles with the newspaper. She decided to co-found a newspaper with a friend, and she revived her pseudonym to bad-mouth a boxer who threatened to beat up Pepe Faroles. When Pepe (Vicens) agreed to meet with the boxer, he was stunned to find out who was behind the pseudonym.

Vicens published a number of political articles throughout her career under the pen name “Diógenes García.” She discussed issues of workers’ rights, Mexican political corruption, and a range of societal issues after the Mexican Revolution.

Vicens went by many pseudonyms, depending on the subject area about which she was publishing, but she affixed her own name to the articles she wrote about films.

== Sources ==
- Eladio Cortes, Dictionary of Mexican Literature, Greenwood Press (1992), ISBN 0-313-26271-3
