= San Miguel Canoa massacre =

Lynching on 14 September 1968

- Location: San Miguel Canoa, Puebla, Mexico
- Date: September 14, 1968; 58 years ago
- Attack type: Massacre, lynching
- Deaths: 4
- Injuries: 3
- Motive: Anti-communism

The Massacre of San Miguel Canoa was a lynching that occurred in the village of San Miguel Canoa in Puebla, Mexico on 14 September 1968. Enrique Meza Pérez, a right-wing priest, incited a mob of villagers to attack five mountain climbers whom he believed were communists. Four were killed in the attack and three sustained serious injuries, but survived.

== Background ==
For a considerable period, San Miguel Canoa existed as an independent municipality; however, in 1962, its municipal status was dissolved, and it was incorporated into the Municipality of Puebla, despite being situated 12 kilometers away from the municipal seat. This power vacuum led to the town's isolation and a lack of civil authority; for the inhabitants, the sole authority resided in the priest of the Church of San Miguel. He exercised this authority by collecting taxes and lobbying municipal and state governments for road paving and the installation of public services—funding all these initiatives through his religious organizations. Those unable to pay these contributions were compelled to perform manual labor on the town's construction projects. This situation triggered an exodus of residents who refused to live under clerical rule but were powerless to oppose the majority.

Since the majority of the townspeople spoke Nahuatl, they neither read newspapers nor watched television; consequently, they remained completely unaware of the student movement of 1968, which was unfolding in Mexico City at the time.

== Incident ==
In September of 1968, five employees of the Autonomous University of Puebla decided to climb La Malinche, a mountain in central Mexico. Julián González Báez, a 26-year-old husband and father of two who had experience climbing La Malinche, organized the group and brought along Ramón Gutiérrez Calvario, Jesús Carrillo Sánchez, Miguel Flores Cruz, and Roberto Rojano Aguirre. The five of them took a public bus to San Miguel Canoa, a town near the base of La Malinche, arriving around 6 p.m. Their original plan was to camp out with a bonfire on the side of the mountain for the night, but when they arrived in San Miguel Canoa, they were met with heavy rain. They decided to seek shelter in town.

They first asked the owner of a local store for lodging, but the owner declined. Next, they went to the local church asking for shelter, explaining they were employees of the University. They were again declined. Ramón and Jesús started to get concerned and wanted to leave. The group decided to flip a coin. The coin determined they would stay.

The men then came across Odilón García who had just arrived in Canoa to visit his brother Lucas. After hearing their situation, Odilón García invited them to stay at his brother's house, located three blocks from the local church. While in Lucas García's adobe home, they were told stories of the local priest, Enrique Meza Pérez, whom García accused of corruption and abuse of power. After about 40 minutes, they started to hear commotion and shouting in Náhuatl and Spanish. They heard church bells and, according to the Diario de Puebla in its September 18, 1968 issue, "from a loudspeaker placed in the center of the town, the alarm was heard, announcing that communists had arrived to distribute propaganda." The men became worried. According to various accounts, the villagers—instigated by the priest—accused the young men of being communists and of attempting to hoist a red-and-black flag at the local church, all within the context of the 1968 Student Movement. Days prior to the mountaineers' arrival, the priest had delivered an inflammatory sermon; he spoke of "communists" who, with their flag—"red as hell, black as sin"—were insulting both God and the homeland. He asserted that they would soon arrive in San Miguel to dispossess the inhabitants and outlaw religion.

The angry mob came closer, carrying machetes, stones, sticks, and pistols, and knocked on Lucas García's door. García tried to defend the men, but the townspeople wouldn't listen. García was immediately killed in front of his family, including his four children, by a machete blow to the neck and a gunshot wound. The mob then began to attack the University employees, whom they confused for students, brutally beating them and accusing them of carrying propaganda. A police commander showed up but wasn't able to stop the mob. Ramón and Jesús were killed immediately from machete wounds. Miguel, Roberto, and Julián were taken, badly injured, to the town square, next to the church. It was still raining.

The mob continued to beat and torture the men, threatening to kill them. Due to a blockade that some locals had put in the road, it wasn't until 5 a.m. the next morning that authorities arrived and stopped the mob. Julián, Miguel, and Roberto managed to survive but were seriously injured. X-rays showed several wounds to the head, as well as kidney injuries and severe muscle pain. Julián lost several fingers from a machete blow during the attack. The fingers were given to his pregnant wife, Pilar Flores, in a bag that morning at the hospital.

== Aftermath ==
Shortly after the killings, journalists would provide the different accounts of the massacre; one based in the reality of the event, and another that falsely depicted the assault as a result of the students robbing a local store.

According to the closing text at the end of the film Canoa: A Shameful Memory, which is based on these events, seventeen arrest warrants were issued and five people were prosecuted, two of whom were released as their involvement in the events could not be proven. A third was sentenced to eight years and was released after two years when the sentence was overturned. The remaining two were sentenced to eight and eleven years in prison and were currently serving their sentences at the time of the release of the film in 1976.

Tomasa García, Lucas's widow, identified the 17 neighbors who had killed her husband in front of her and her children, as well as the two young men. The town ostracized her for identifying the culprits, and she and her children were subsequently persecuted and harassed.

Two weeks after the massacre in Canoa, a related incident, the Tlatelolco massacre occurred in which around 400 people were killed by government forces. The Tlatelolco massacre largely overshadowed coverage of the San Miguel Canoa Massacre.

As of September 14, 2018, Julián González Báez is still alive. Julián says he does not hold a grudge against the indigenous community, but confirmed that he never returned to San Miguel Canoa. Roberto Rojano Aguirre, passed away around 2008, from suicide after the death of his wife. Flores Cruz died around 2011 from leukemia. The priest, Enrique Meza Pérez, who was accused of inciting the attacks, was never convicted of any crimes. He was only sent to the parish of Santa Inés Ahuatempan. González Báez also charged that neither Meza Pérez, nor those implicated in the multiple homicide—whether as masterminds or direct perpetrators—ever faced punishment.

== In popular culture ==
Felipe Cazals directed a feature film about the event called Canoa: A Shameful Memory released in 1976.

The film is alluded to in the song "Iglesia de San Miguel Canoa" by the Mexican group Los Macuanos.
