= Maria Novaro =

Mexican film director (born 1951)

María Novaro
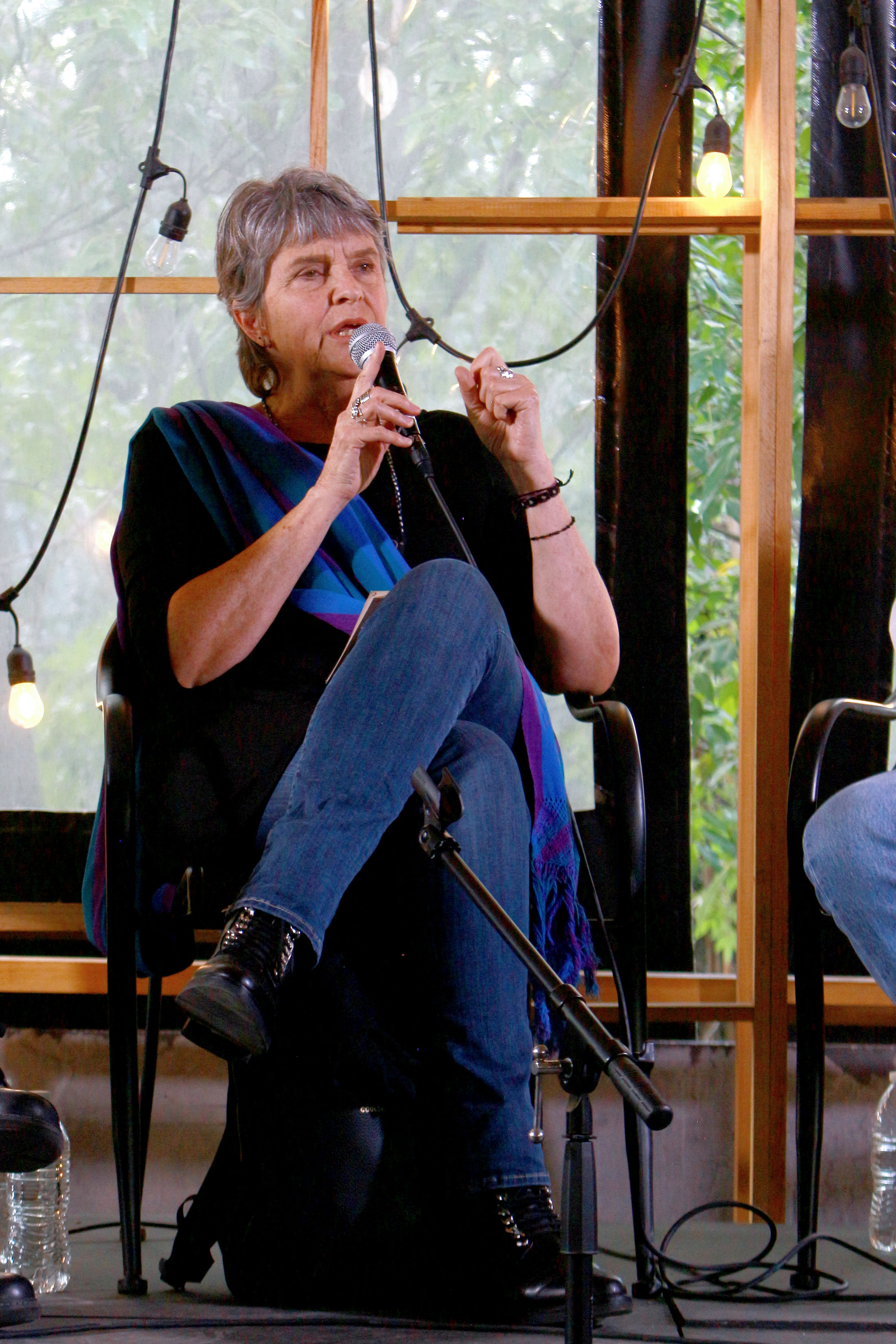
- Born: María Luisa Novaro Peñaloza; 11 September 1951; Mexico City
- Education: Universidad Nacional Autónoma de Mexico
- Occupation(s): Film director, film producer, screenwriter, film editor

María Novaro (born María Luisa Novaro Peñaloza; September 11, 1951, in Mexico City) is a Mexican film director. She was among the first generation of female filmmakers to graduate from a film school in Mexico. She has made six feature films and fourteen short films. Within the Mexican film industry, she has been a cinematographer, sound mixer, director, screenwriter and editor. Today, Novaro is one of the best known Mexican filmmakers to come out of the New Mexican Cinema and her films express Millian's idea of cinema in feminine.

== Education ==
María Novaro studied sociology at the National Autonomous University of Mexico, UNAM. After gaining some interest in filmmaking she decided to study film at the Centro Universitario de Estudios Cinematográficos based in UNAM. In 1981, while at the Centro Universitario de Estudios Cinematográficos, she made her first short films Lavaderos, sobre las olas and De encaje y azúcar all on a super 8 camera. Later became a member of the Cine Mujer collective, which was a women's film collective interested in women's stories and creating opportunities for women in the Mexican film industry, and who joins her countryman and fellow director Jaime Humberto Hermosillo in her desire to make films that contemplate the macho-dominated culture of Mexico— she from the feminine perspective (not feminist, she insists), he from the homosexual one. It is this collective in which Novaro directed Es la Primera Vez in 1981.

== Career ==
Maria Novaro started her career in the Mexican film industry as a cinematographer and sound mixer. It was only after she worked as an assistant director for the Alberto Cortés film Amor a la Vuelta de la Esquina (1985) that she decided to make her short film Una Isla Rodeada de Agua (1985). This short was a feminist adaptation of the famous Mexican novel Pedro Páramo by Juan Rulfo. In this short film, a young girl goes on a journey to the Guerrero coast in search for a mother that abandoned her. The theme of a female protagonist on a journey through contemporary Mexico in search of something or someone is established in this short film and is carried out throughout her films.
Her next short Azul Celeste (1987) told the story of a pregnant woman looking for her baby's father in Mexico City. This story carried over into her first feature film Lola (1989).

=== Feature films ===
==== Lola ====
Novaro co-wrote Lola with her sister Beatriz. Lola, named after the protagonist, tells the story of a woman that has been abandoned by her daughter's father. She is confronted with isolation and hopelessness in vast Mexico City as she tries to relocate her daughter's father. Many feminist criticizes the passive Lola character and the way in which she cannot overcome her abandonment. However, Novaro has said that she refuses to be limited by taking a political stance and does not consider her work to be feminist. In an interview with Isabel Arredondo, Novaro has said that with Lola, she was not only interested in the story of Lola and her child but the film was a way to “reflect profoundly on women, motherhood and Mexico City”. Therefore, Lola being controlled by her emotions makes her an accurate depiction of a woman going through abandonment.

==== Danzon ====
As she was finishing the editing of Lola she decided to write a much lighter story and in collaboration with her sister wrote Danzón (1991) which was the second feature to be directed by María Novaro. The danzón of Novaro's title, loosely translated as “refined ballroom dance,” is simple in nature: Each partner concentrates on completing a perfect square of steps, making eye contact only fleetingly in what amounts to a pantomime of courtship, of male pursuit and female coquetry. The danzón is danced to sentimental ballads in the salones de baile (dance halls) of Mexico, where a largely working-class clientele gathers to display dance steps that have remained unchanged for generations, amid shimmering light and flashy decor that evoke the era of the 1940s and 1950s. In Danzón she portrays the traditional Mexican dancehall culture, which has strict gender codes and procedures and contrasts it to the port-town of Veracruz. The film follows Julia Solorzono (María Rojo), a single mother whose only escape is in the popular dance halls of Mexico City. When her usual partner Carmelo (Daniel Regis) does not show up for their dance meetings she decides to leave her kids behind and go look for him in Veracruz where he is from. It is a journey of self-discovery for Julia as she abandons the search for Carmelo and enjoys the Veracruz life before going back to life in Mexico City. Danzón was the film that established her career and gained her international attention.
Novaro decided to play with the traditional melodrama genre, which is very popular amongst Mexican women, by adding humor to the movie. She also treats the subjects of women and homosexuality, but with something that is beyond the ken of the Spaniard Almodóvar: psychological penetration and genuine feeling. Danzón, as you can guess from its title, is a dance film. Leaving aside such musicals as Grease (1978) and Hair (1979), together with such ballet films as The Turning Point (1977) and Blood Wedding (1981), there have been two types of dance movies over the fifteen years or so preceding the making of Danzón : the fast dance film, which emphasizes the liberating spontaneity and physicality, if not sexuality, of the dance floor (e.g., Saturday Night Fever [1977], Flashdance [1983], and Dirty Dancing [1987]), and its opposite number, the ballroom dance picture, which highlights the restraint, elegance, and stylization— the structure — to be found in ballroom dancing, a tradition untarnished by displays of cheap emotion and obvious sensuality. The one dance relieves the protagonist of his inhibitions and thus frees him from the numbing routine of daily (working) life, the other restores those inhibitions at the same time that it replaces the routine of everyday life with another, far more pleasurable, even less deviating one.
Her next two features, El jardín del Edén (1994) and Sin Dejar Huella (2000) focus on the idea of Borderlands while still sticking to her theme of females on a journey through Mexico. It is through her narrative that she explores new ways of seeing Mexico that depart from stereotypical representations of the borderlands and its inhabitants.

==== El Jardín de Eden ====
The Garden of Eden (1994) was filmed in Tijuana and its surroundings on both sides of the border between Mexico and the United States. It was a co-production with France and Canada. Premiered at the Venice Festival of 1994, it had a wide European distribution. It received a Coral Prize in Havana, the Glauber Rocha Award from the Latin American specialized critics, and the best actor award at the Festival de Cartagena (to Bruno Bichir). This film was not shown on Mexican screens as a result of the recent North American Free Trade Agreement (NAFTA), in which cinema was not protected as a cultural exception.

==== Sin Dejar Huella ====
Without Leaving a Trace (2000) is a road movie that was filmed in a long journey from Ciudad Juárez to the Mexican Caribbean coast in Quintana Roo. Starring Tiaré Scanda and Aitana Sánchez-Gijón, it was a co-production with Spain and had its world premiere in San Sebastián. Awarded as the best Latin American film at the 2001 Sundance Festival, she also won the Audience Award at the Los Angeles Latino Festival, the Audience Award at the Guadalajara Festival and the Critics' Award. He won two Ariel awards: for best photography and best special effects.

==== Las Buenas Hierbas ====
The Good Herbs (2010), starring Úrsula Pruneda, Ofelia Medina, and Ana Ofelia Murguía, premiered at the Rome Festival, where she won the Best Female Performance Award (shared with her three protagonists). On this occasion, she e fully explored the world of mother-daughter relationships, Alzheimer's and ethnobotany.
Winning eight Maguey awards at the Guadalajara Festival, including the audience award for the best film, best screenplay, best female performance (Ursula Pruneda) and best photography, among others. She received two awards at the Amazonas Film Festival (best screenplay and best female performance) and also received two Ariel awards, one for better female co-act (Ofelia Medina) and another for visual effects (Alejandro Valle). In the Festival of Sto. Domingo received the best music award (La Lengua) and won the Grand Coral Third Prize at the Havana Film Festival that same year. Distributed mainly in Asian countries, it was commercialized for more than a year in several cities in Japan.

==== Tesoros ====
Tesoros was directed, written, produced and edited by Maria Novaro, released in 2017 marks a departure for the much Mexican film. Its story has Dylan who already plays a pirates video game on his iPad, dreaming of Francis Drake appearing to him on a dark and stormy night and telling him he's saved up a treasure for the young boy. Dylan and his new primary school friends embark on a leisurely hunt to find the treasure trove, which takes them to limestone islands just off the coast. The film starts off with a view of the subtropical forest and a deep marine blue tropical sky, captured from a van, painted light blue, taking six-year-old Dylan and his family to live in Barra del Potosi, a stunningly quaint beachside chalet community behind a sandbar on Mexico's Pacific Coast.
Tesoros is thoroughly lit by bright warm colors and an eye for a palette of blues and yellows and standout reds that transfer the soft tones of the seascapes to open door houses, even a school, whose walls and shelves are spangled with lively toys and students’ paintings. When Novaro was questioned about her unusual choice of style for her new film she answered, “I was interested in making something different from what we normally get with children’s films. I wanted to make it very real. Although there is the fantasy in the children’s lives, I wanted to find a way for that fantasy to be completely linked to the real world, a world as experienced by children in my country. So I wrote the story to happen in this place, a paradise, though part of one of the most violent states in all Mexico, the state of Guerrero.”

=== Short films ===
One of Novaro's first short films (a school work: An Island Surrounded by Water, 1984) was acquired by the Museum of Modern Art in New York for its permanent film collection and was distributed in the United States by Women Make Movies. The film obtained a special mention from the jury at the Clermont-Ferrand Short Film Festival, and the Ariel for Best Fiction Short Film.

Azul Celeste (1987) is a 40-minute short that was originally part of the movie “Historias de Ciudad” (produced by the Department of Cinematographic Activities of the UNAM). Already as an independent film, it won the Golden Dancer Award for Best Film at the Huesca International Film Festival, and also the Fifth Centennial Prize, in addition to being nominated for an Ariel.

Other short films featured in Novaro's filmography are: Sin Miedo (2010), La Morena (2004, also Best Film in Huesca), and Otoñal (1995) premiered at the Venice Festival in the Finestre Sulle Imagini section.

== Legacy ==
Novaro has said that the work of Andrei Tarkovsky, Michelangelo Antonioni, and Theodoros Angelopoulos inspired her narrative style particularly the way she sees her film story as poetry and not dramaturgy. She has also mentioned that the most important thing to consider as a director is to be able to hear your own voice within your film. She cites Ingmar Bergman in an interview saying “that when a director no longer hears his internal voice he’s lost”. While Novaro does not see herself as a feminist her “subjects have a conscience of gender and act in accordance”. The recurrence of themes such as motherhood, female friendship and absent males provides an establishment of the protagonist turning to her fellow women for help and guidance. Novaro has also stated that in each film she has sought to tell the stories of one of the many Mexicos that exist. She is the scriptwriter of all her films; three of them were written in collaboration with his sister Beatriz Novaro. She has also been an editor and producer. She is currently reworking “La Lista”, a script that won the 1996 Cosme Alves Neto Award in Brazil for the best Latin American screenplay but never had the chance to film. Other projects that she failed to carry out in her difficult time during the second half of the 90s were: a film adaptation of Carlos Montemayor's novel, “Guerra en el paraíso”, and a screenplay by Rosa Nissan and Beatriz Novaro entitled “Suculentas” (based in Nissan's novel: The Journeys of My Body.) She has had a successful career in film teaching since 1996, teaching courses and workshops at CUEC, CCC (Cinematographic Training Center), at the University of New Mexico in Albuquerque, the University of Texas, Columbia University, SAE Institute-Mexico and in several Mexican states such as Chiapas, Sonora, and Nuevo León. She has thus contributed to the formation of several generations of filmmakers in Mexico. In 2006 he founded (along with a group of young filmmakers who graduated from the CCC and his former students) the production house Axolote Cine which to date has produced “Los Últimos Cristeros”, “Wadley” and “El Calambre”, by Matías Meyer, “Tormentero” and “Cephalopod”, by Rubén Imaz, “Strange but true”, and “Malaventura”, by Michel Lipkes, “Calle López” by Gerardo Barroso and Lisa Tillinger, “Mosca” and “La Nación Interior”, by Bulmaro Osornio, “Las Marimbas del Infierno”, by Julio Hernández. Axolote Cine was also the producer of “Las buenas hierbas”.
In 2007 she produced, together with Laura Imperiale, the film “Quemar las naves” by Francisco Franco Alba. For her most recent film, “Treasures”, she founded the Cine Ermitaño production house. Among the acknowledgments to her work are: the Guggenheim Scholarship (2005), the Gateways Grant (2003), the Rockefeller-MacArthur Scholarship (1992–93) and she has been a member of the National System of Creators in Mexico in several periods. Member of the Academy of Motion Picture Arts and Sciences (USA), the Film Academy of Spain and AMACC in Mexico. Retrospectives and tributes to her work have been made; at Casa de América, Madrid (2010), a Tribute to her Artistic Career at the Monterrey Festival (2009), the MUSA recognition granted by Mujeres en la Cine y la Televisión A.C. (within the framework of the International Film Festival of Guanajuato, 2013) and a retrospective exhibition shared with Werner Herzog and Apichatpong Weerasethakul within the Film Festival in Kerala, India (2010), among others. She has 3 children (Mara, Santiago, and Lucero) and 3 grandchildren (Andrea, Dylan and Jacinta), and she always includes them in her curriculum.

== Award and Nominations ==
Film	Awards	Nominations
Una Isla Rodeada de Agua (1985)	Silver Ariel for Best Short Fiction Film	
Azul Celeste (1988)	Golden Danzante award at the Huesca Film Festival	
Lola (1989)	Silver Ariels at the Mexican Ariel Awards for Best First Work and Best Screenplay; OCIC award at the Berlin International Film Festival; Coral award at the Havana Film Festival for Best First Work; Permio ACE for Best First Work in Cinema	Silver Ariel for Best Original Story
El Jardín del Edén (1994)	Grand Coral Second Prize at the Havana Film Festival	Silver Ariels for Best Direction and Best Original Story
Sin Dejar Huella (2000)	Latin American Cinema Award at the Sundance Film Festival in 2001	Silver Ariel for Best Screenplay; Golden Shell at the San Sebastián International Film Festival
Las Buenas Hierbas (2008)	Grand Coral Third Prize at the Havana Film Festival	
Lola (1989)	Silver Ariels at the Mexican Ariel Awards for Best First Work and Best Screenplay; OCIC award at the Berlin International Film Festival; Coral award at the Havana Film Festival for Best First Work; Permio ACE for Best First Work in Cinema	Silver Ariel for Best Original Story
Tesoros (2017)	Premio de la Competencia Internacional del Festival Internacional de Mujeres en el Cine (FIM Cine) in Brazil; Best Directed at the Film for Kids Festival in China; Best Edited at the Habana; Best Picture in Seattle, Valencia and San Diego; Save The Children Award	Chrystal Bear Generation for Kplus - Best Film at Berlin International FilmFestival

== Filmography ==
Feature Films

Year	English Title	Spanish Title
2017	Treasures	Tesoros
2008	The Good Herbs	Las Buenas Hierbas
2000	Leaving no Trace	Sin Dejar Huella
1994	The Garden of Eden	El Jardín del Edén
1991	Danzón	Danzón
1989	Lola	Lola

Short Films

Year	English Title	Spanish Title
2006	Traducción Simultánea	Traducción Simultánea
2006	La Morena	La Morena
1998	“Entangled Shadows” episode of When We Began to Speak	“Edredando Sombras” Cuando Comencamos a Hablar
1993	Of Autumn	Otoñal
1988	Light Blue	Azul Celeste
1985	Perverted	Pervertida
1985	An Island Surrounded by Water	Una Isla Rodeada de Agua
1983	Dear Carmen	Querida Carmen
1982	7 a.m	7 a.m
1982	With Me You’ll Have a Good Time	Conmigo la Pasarás Muy Bien
1981	It’s the First Time	Es la Permiera Vez
1981	Sugar and Lace	De Encaje y Azúcar
1981	Above the Waves	Sobre las Olas
1981	The Washers	Lavaderos
