= National School of Cinematic Arts =

- Escuela Nacional de Artes Cinematográficas
- Former names: Centro Universitario de Estudios Cinematográficos
- Type: Public Film School
- Established: 1963
- Director: María de los Ángeles Castro Gurría
- Location: Circuito Mario de la Cueva S/N, Coyoacán, Cd Universitaria, 04510 Mexico City, Mexico
- Campus: National Autonomous University of Mexico
- Language: Spanish
- Colors: Blue and Gold
- Website: www.enac.unam.mx

The National School of Cinematic Arts (Spanish: Escuela Nacional de Artes Cinematográficas (or ENAC)), formerly the University Center for Cinematographic Studies (Spanish: Centro Universitario de Estudios Cinematográficos, CUEC), is the film school of the National Autonomous University of Mexico (UNAM). Founded in 1963, was influenced by the Nouvelle Vague and by the First Contest of Experimental Film organized in Mexico that year.

In 42 years, CUEC has had as students several of the main Mexican filmmakers.

ENAC produces almost 100 short films a year, many showing at international festivals.

== History ==
The Escuela Nacional de Artes Cinematográficas was founded in 1963 as the official film school of the National Autonomous University of Mexico. In 1972, it became a member of the International Association of Film and Television Schools (CILECT). In 1986, it launched an annual cycle of film production. In 2015, the school launched a degree in Cinematography with nine specialty fields. In 2019, the school was supplemented by the National School of Cinematographic Arts, a new UNAM entity designed to give a national dimension to the film school.

== Notable alumni ==
- Alfonso Cuarón
- Emmanuel Lubezki
- Henner Hofmann
- Alexis Zabé
- Jaime Aparicio
- Nicolas Echevarría
- Fernando Eimbcke
- Luis Estrada
- Jorge Fons
- Jaime Humberto Hermosillo
- Julian Hernandez
- Juan Mora
- Carlos Marcovich
- Maria Novaro
- Raúl Kamffer (1st generation)
