= María Rojo =

Mexican actress and politician

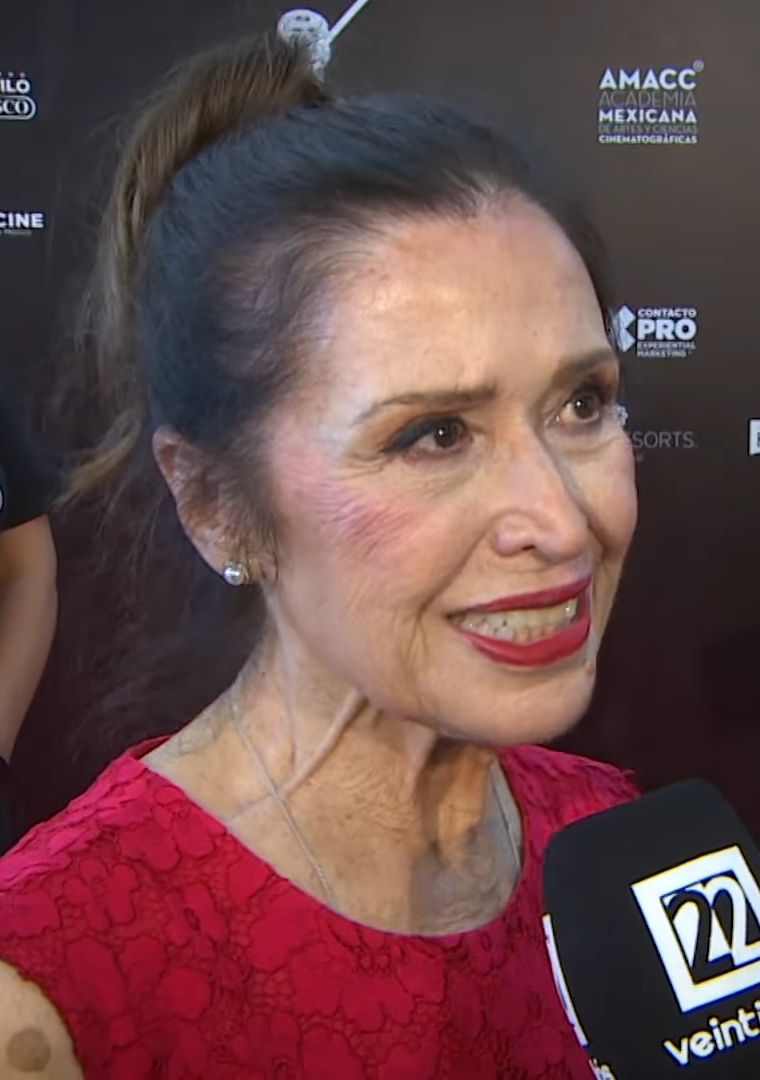
- Rojo in 2025

Senator of the Republic
- In office September 1, 2006 – August 31, 2012

Member of the Legislative Assembly of the Federal District
- In office September 15, 2003 – September 14, 2006

Borough Chief of Coyoacán, Mexico City
- In office October 1, 2000 – April 4, 2003
- Preceded by: Laura Itzel Castillo
- Succeeded by: Raul Flores Garcia

Member of the Chamber of Deputies
- In office September 1, 1997 – August 31, 2000

Personal details
- Born: 15 August 1943 (age 82) Mexico City, Mexico
- Party: PRD
- Occupation: Actress; Politician
- Website: www.senado.gob.mx

María de Lourdes Rojo e Incháustegui, professionally known as María Rojo (Spanish pronunciation: [maˈɾi.a ˈroxo]; born August 15, 1943), is a Mexican actress and politician. She debuted during the Golden Age of Mexican cinema with the film Besos prohibidos (1956).

Her successful cinematographic projects include: Rojo amanecer (1990), Danzón (1991), La tarea (1991), Perfume de violetas, nadie te oye (2001), El callejón de los milagros (1995) and El Infierno (2010); as for telenovelas, she stood out for: Te sigo amando, Alborada, Mañana es para siempre, Corazón Salvaje, and Hasta el fin del mundo.

From 2000 to 2003, she served as the head of the Coyoacán delegation, while from 2006 to 2012, she was a senator.

== Life and career ==
=== Early years and beginnings ===
María Rojo was born on August 15, 1943, in Mexico City. She began her artistic career at eight years in the program Teatro Fantástico with Enrique Alonso "Cachirulo". After acting in several plays as La Mala Semilla and Examen de Muertos in 1955, she began her film career at age 13 in the film Besos Prohibidos in 1956.

=== Further roles ===
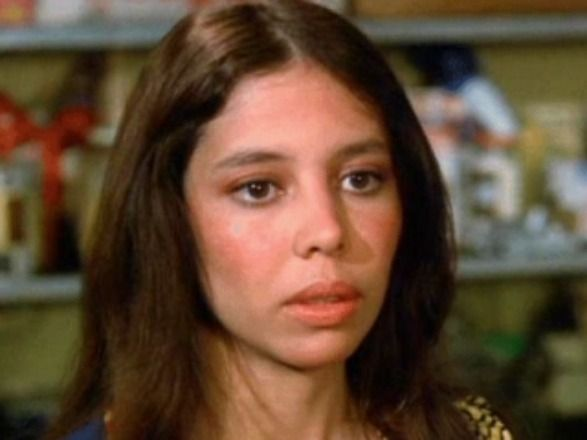
María Rojo in Candy Stripe Nurses (1974)

In 1974, she internationalized her career by participating in the American B movie, Candy Stripe Nurses. Back in Mexico, her first starring role was in 1975 with the movie El Apando. From there, she has worked in over 70 productions and has become one of the most important actresses of Mexican cinema. Her most recognized performances were in the films Rojo amanecer, Danzón, La tarea, El callejón de los milagros, Salón México, Confidencias, De noche vienes, Esmeralda, Crónica de un desayuno and El Infierno.

She also participated in the successful telenovelas Cuando llega el amor, in 1990; La antorcha encendida, in 1996 (in which she played the role of Josefa Ortiz de Dominguez; Te Sigo Amando, in 1996; Alborada, in 2005–2006; Mañana es para siempre, in 2008–2009; and recently Corazón Salvaje, in 2009–2010 and returns to the telenovela in 2014, Hasta el fin del mundo. Rojo also participated in Mexican TV Series such as: Mujeres Asesinas, in 2008–today; and Gritos de Muerte y Libertad, in 2010, as well as in many theatre plays.

=== Political foray ===
Maria Rojo was federal deputy in the LVII Legislature of the Congress of the Union in the lower house 1997–2000.

On October 1, 2000, she began her mandate as Borough Chief of Coyoacán in Mexico City. She left office April 4, 2003, to compete for a position in the Legislative Assembly of the Federal District (legislature in Mexico City).

On September 1, 2006, she took office as Senator of the Republic in the upper house of Mexican Congress for the period 2006–2012. She served as chair of the committee on culture.
