= Fe, Esperanza y Caridad =

- Directed by: Luis Alcoriza; Jorge Fons; Alberto Bojórquez
- Written by: Luis Alcoriza; Julio Alejandro; Jose de la Colina
- Starring: Katy Jurado; Milton Rodríguez; Fabiola Falcón
- Cinematography: Gabriel Torres
- Distributed by: Estudios Churubusco Azteca S.A
- Release date: 1974
- Running time: 113 min
- Country: Mexico
- Language: Spanish

Fe, Esperanza y Caridad (English: Faith, Hope and Charity) is a Mexican film comprising three short stories. It was made in 1974.

== Synopsis ==
The film compiles three stories, each named for part of the main title. The first, "Fe" (Faith), is the story of a woman who travels to a distant town seeking a miracle to save her husband from disease. On the journey she is raped by fellow pilgrims; returning home she finds that the miracle has taken place and her husband is well. She vows to make the pilgrimage again the next year. The second story, "Esperanza" (Hope), concerns a man who, hoping to help his mother, consents to be nailed to a cross as part of a "JesusChrist" freak show. Unfortunately he is unable to afford the silver nails that would have helped him avoid infection. The final story, "Caridad" (Charity), stars Katy Jurado as a humble woman facing a lack of charity from those in authority. She comes into conflict with her son over a childish fight, and her husband is killed.

== Cast ==
=== Fe (Faith) ===
- Fabiola Falcón
- Beto, el Boticario
- Queta Carrasco
- Armando Silvestre
- Leonor Llausás
- Fernando Soto "Mantequilla"
- David Silva

=== Esperanza (Hope) ===
- Milton Rodríguez
- Raul Astor
- Anita Blanch
- Lilia Prado
- Sasha Montenegro

=== Caridad (Charity) ===
- Katy Jurado
- Julio Aldama
- Sara García
- Stella Inda
