= Vicente Leñero =

Mexican novelist, journalist, and playwright

Vicente Leñero Otero (June 9, 1933 – December 3, 2014) was a Mexican novelist, journalist, and playwright. He wrote numerous books, stories, and plays, including a theatrical adaptation of Oscar Lewis's The Children of Sanchez. He was awarded the Premio Xavier Villaurrutia in 2001, and the following year he received the Premio Nacional de Ciencias y Artes de México (National Prize of Arts and Sciences) for literature and linguistics.

== Works ==
Leñero was born in Guadalajara, Jalisco. Graduating from the National Autonomous University of Mexico (UNAM) in 1959 with a degree in civil engineering, Leñero soon turned to writing to support himself. His first novel, La voz adolorida (1961), exhibits the psychological realism of his early writings, consisting of a mentally ill patient's monologue about his life before entering an asylum. The Bricklayers (Spanish: Los albañiles) followed in 1963, winning the Premio Biblioteca Breve, a prestigious literature award. Praised for its complex structure and symbolism, the work tells the story of a watchman at a construction site.

Soon after, Leñero turned to playwriting, adapting Los albañiles to drama format in 1970, as well as La carpa (1971) and an adaptation of Los hijos de Sánchez (The Children of Sanchez, 1972). He was influential in starting the documentary genre of theater in Mexico, and two of his notable works are Pueblo rechazado and El juicio. In the 1980s, Leñero released several successful nonfiction books, La gota de agua, and Asesinato: el doble crimen de los Flores Muñoz.

His work also extends to other genres. Leñero worked as a screenwriter for El callejón de los milagros, film for which he received an Ariel Award in 1995 by the Mexican Academy of Film and El crimen del Padre Amaro (2002, The Crime of Padre Amaro), one of Mexico's highest-grossing movies. He also has worked as a journalist for publications such as Claudia, Excélsior and Proceso.

He also adapted the story from Fuera del cielo for its film version that was released in 2007.

Leñero died of lung cancer in Mexico City on December 3, 2014, aged 81.

== Selected filmography ==
- Miroslava (1993)
