= Presagio =

- Directed by: Luis Alcoriza
- Written by: Luis Alcoriza; Gabriel García Márquez
- Produced by: Ramiro Meléndez
- Starring: David Reynoso; Fabiola Falcón; Lucha Villa; Pancho Córdova
- Cinematography: Gabriel Figueroa
- Edited by: Carlos Savage
- Release date: 1975
- Running time: 118 minutes
- Country: Mexico
- Language: Spanish

Presagio ("Omen") is a 1975 Mexican film directed and written by Luis Alcoriza. It was coscripted by Gabriel García Márquez.
