= Jorge Fons =

Mexican film director (1939–2022)

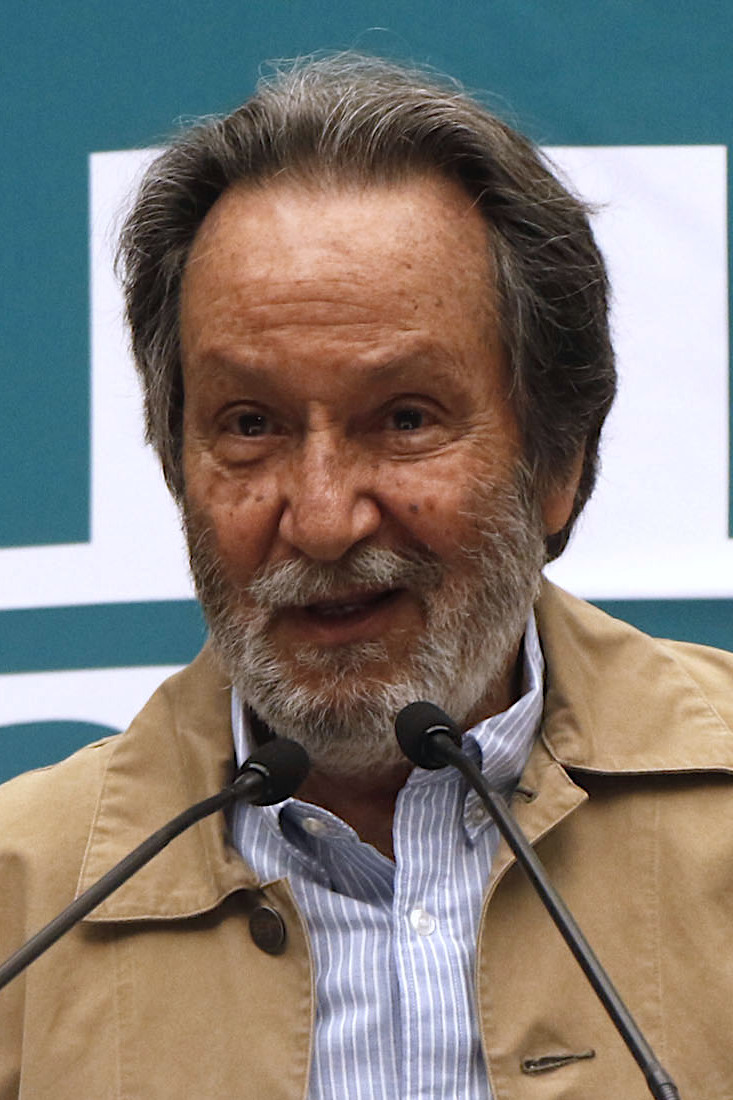
- Fons in 2019
- Born: Jorge Fons Pérez; 23 April 1939; Tuxpan, Veracruz, Mexico
- Died: 22 September 2022 (aged 83); Mexico City, Mexico
- Education: National Autonomous University of Mexico
- Occupations: Film director; Screenwriter
- Years active: 1965–2022

Jorge Fons Pérez (23 April 1939 – 22 September 2022) was a Mexican film director.

He belonged to the first generation of film directors of the National Autonomous University of Mexico (UNAM). His short film, Caridad (1973), is still considered one of the best films in Mexican cinema. Two of the most important films of his filmography are Rojo amanecer (1989) and El callejón de los milagros (1995) based on the homonymous book by Naguib Mahfouz, Midaq Alley of 1947 (زقاق المدق), which breaks the classic lineal plots in films.

His 1976 film, Los albañiles, won the Silver Bear at the 27th Berlin International Film Festival. In 1995, his film El callejón de los milagros won a Special Mention at the 45th Berlin International Film Festival.

Fons died in Mexico City on 22 September 2022, at the age of 83.

== Filmography ==
- El atentado (2010)
- La cumbre (2003)
- Midaq Alley (1995)
- Rojo Amanecer (1989)
- Así es Vietnam (1979)
- The Bricklayers (1976)
- La ETA (1974)
- Victoria (1972)
- Cinco mil dólares de recompensa (1972)
- Fé, Esperanza y Caridad (1972)
- Jory (1973)
- Los cachorros (1971)
- Tú, yo, nosotros (1970)
- Exorcismos (1970)
- La hora de los niños (1969)
- El quelite (1969)
- Trampas de amor (1968)
- Los caifanes (1966)
- Amor, amor amor (1965)
- Los bienamados (1965)
- Pulquería La Rosita (1964)
