= Ariel Award for Best Director =

Ariel Award category

- Awarded for: "Excellence in cinematic direction achievement"
- Country: Mexico
- Presented by: AMACC
- First award: 1947
- Currently held by: David Pablos, En El Camino; Pablo Pérez Lombardini; La Reserva (2026)
- Website: premioariel.com.mx

The Ariel Award for Best Director (Premio Ariel a la Mejor Dirección, officially known as the Ariel Award for Best Directing) is an award presented by the Academia Mexicana de Artes y Ciencias Cinematográficas (AMACC) in Mexico. It is given in honor of a film director who has exhibited outstanding directing while working in the Mexican film industry. In 1947, the 1st and 2nd Ariel Awards were held, with Roberto Gavaldón and Emilio "El Indio" Fernández winning for the films La Barraca and Enamorada, respectively. With the exception of the years 1959 to 1971, when the Ariel Awards were suspended, the award has been given annually. Nominees and winners are determined by a committee formed every year consisting of academy members (active and honorary), previous winners and individuals with at least two Ariel nominations; the committee members submit their votes through the official AMACC website.

In 1953, filmmakers Luis Buñuel, Alfredo B. Crevenna and Gavaldón were nominated, but no winner was declared. Carlos Carrera and Fernández hold the record for most wins in the category, with four each. Carerra's El Crimen del Padre Amaro was nominated for the Academy Award for Best Foreign Language Film in 2003. Since 1976, Felipe Cazals has been nominated at least once every decade, winning three times for El Año de la Peste (1980), Bajo la metralla (1984), and Las Vueltas del Citrillo (2006). Buñuel and Amat Escalante won the Ariel for Best Director and the same award at the Cannes Film Festival for Los Olvidados and Heli, respectively. Alfonso Cuarón is the first director to received the Ariel and the Academy Award for Best Direction for the same film. Astrid Rondero and Fernanda Valadez became the first directing-team to win in 2025 for Sujo, and Valadez the first woman to receive the award twice. Since its inception, the award has been given to 44 directors. As of the 2026 ceremony, David Pablos for En El Camino and Pablo Pérez Lombardini for La Reserva tied in the category.

== Winners and nominees ==
Table key
‡	Indicates the winner

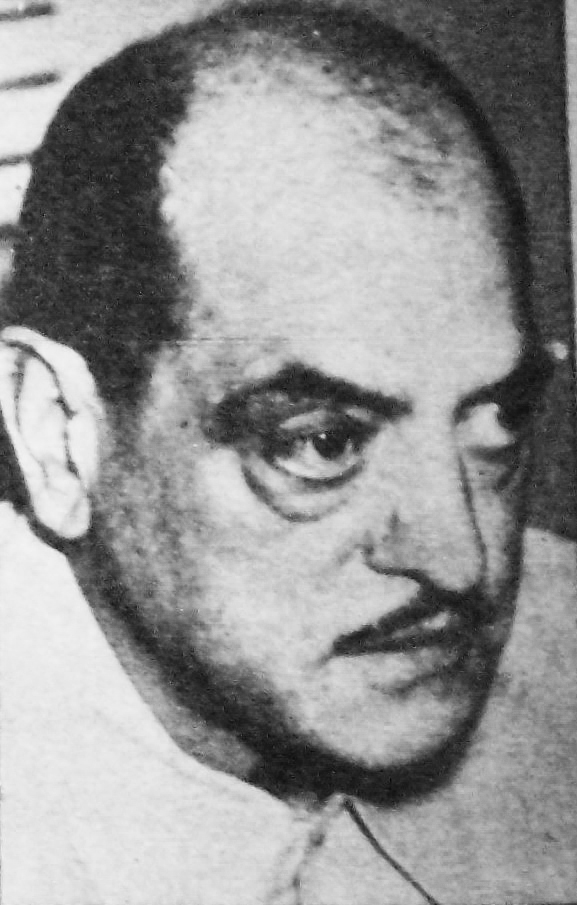
Spanish director Luis Buñuel won twice, for Los Olvidados (1951) and Robinson Crusoe (1956).

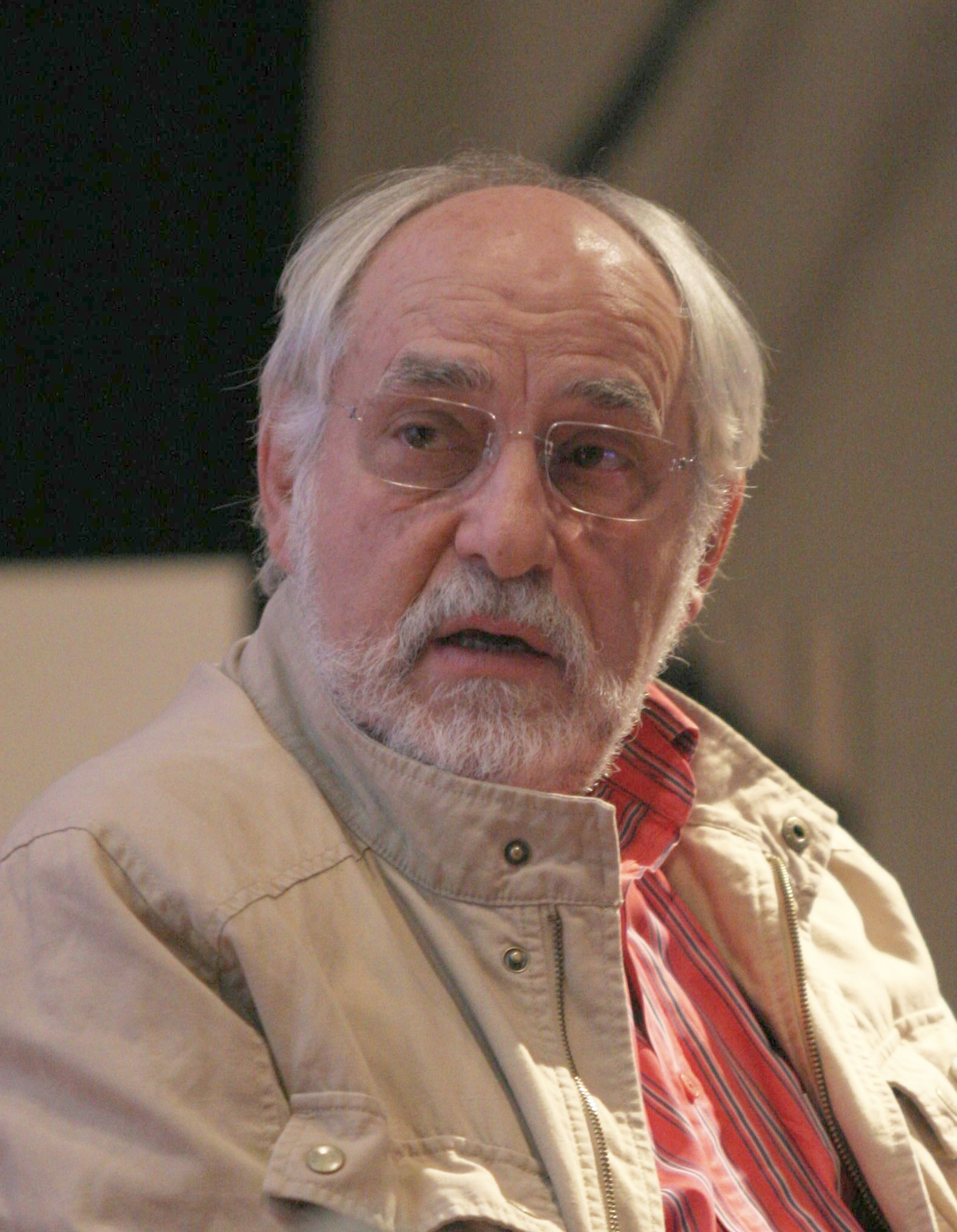
Arturo Ripstein has received the award twice for Cadena Perpetua (1979) and El Imperio de la Fortuna (1987).

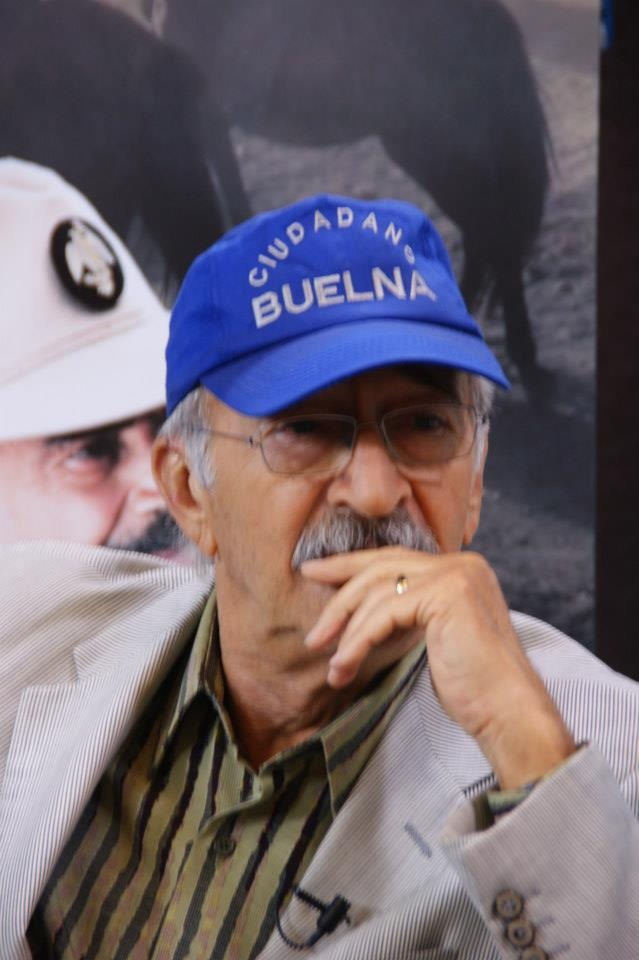
Felipe Cazals won three times, for El Año de la Peste (1980), Bajo la metralla (1984) and Las Vueltas del Citrillo (2006).

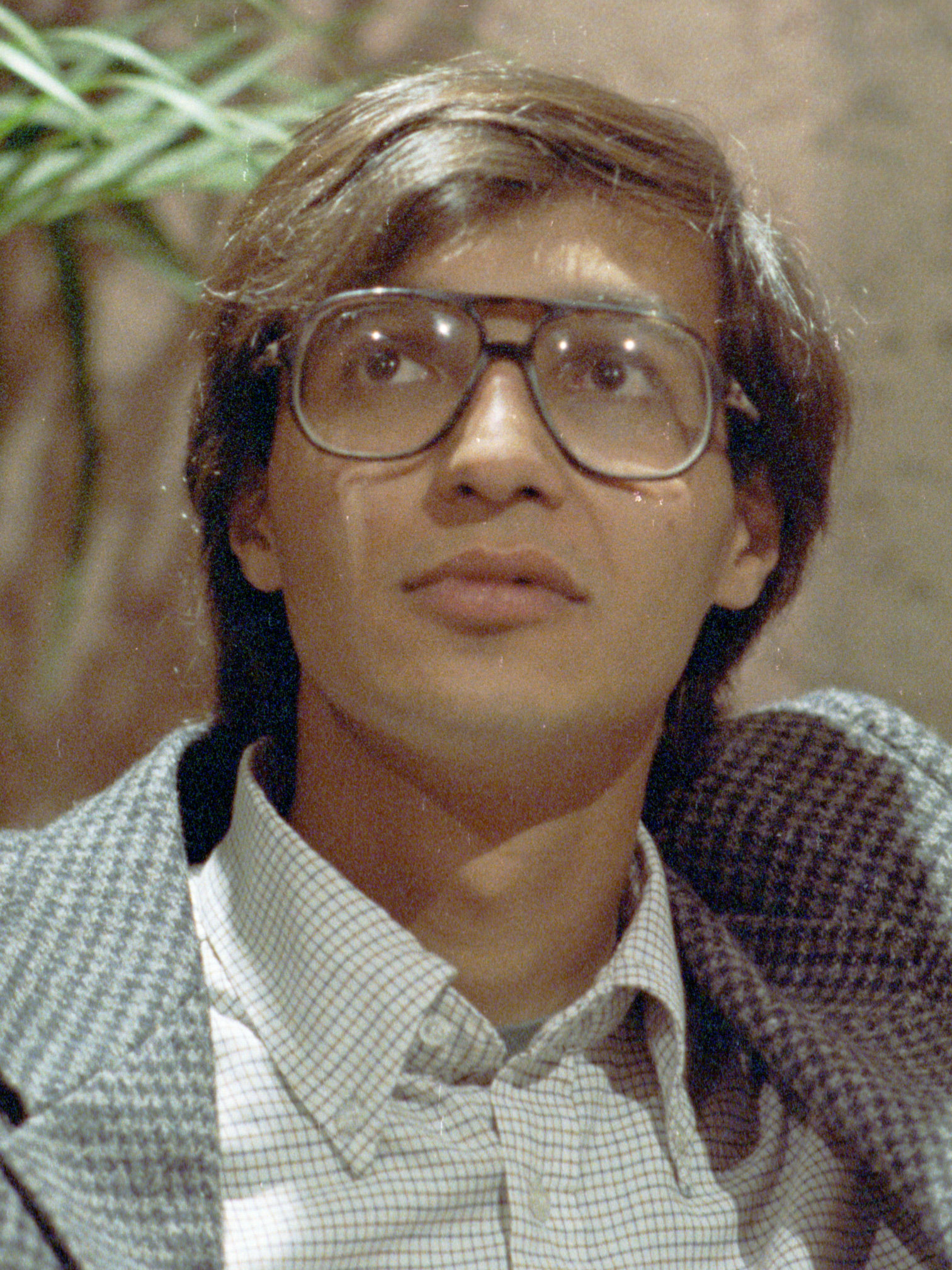
Carlos Carrera has won four times, and is tied with Emilio "El Indio" Fernández for the most wins in the category.

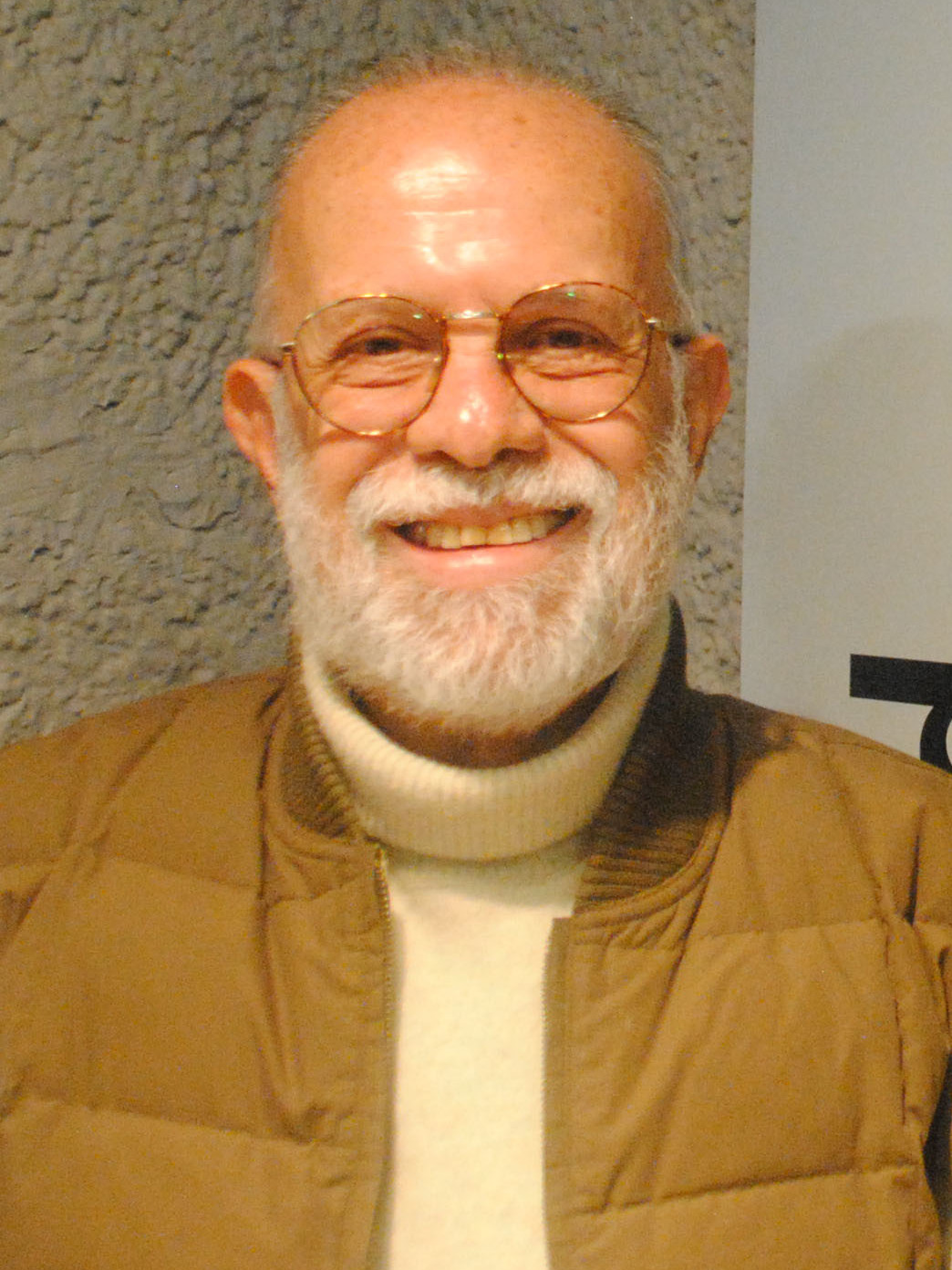
Jaime Humberto Hermosillo has been nominated five times, winning twice for La Pasión Según Berenice (1977) and Naufragio (1978).

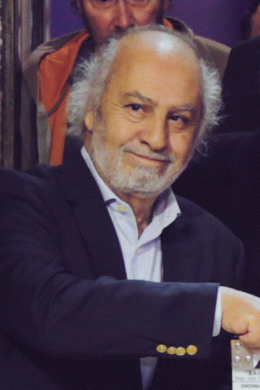
Miguel Littín won for Actas de Marusia (1976).

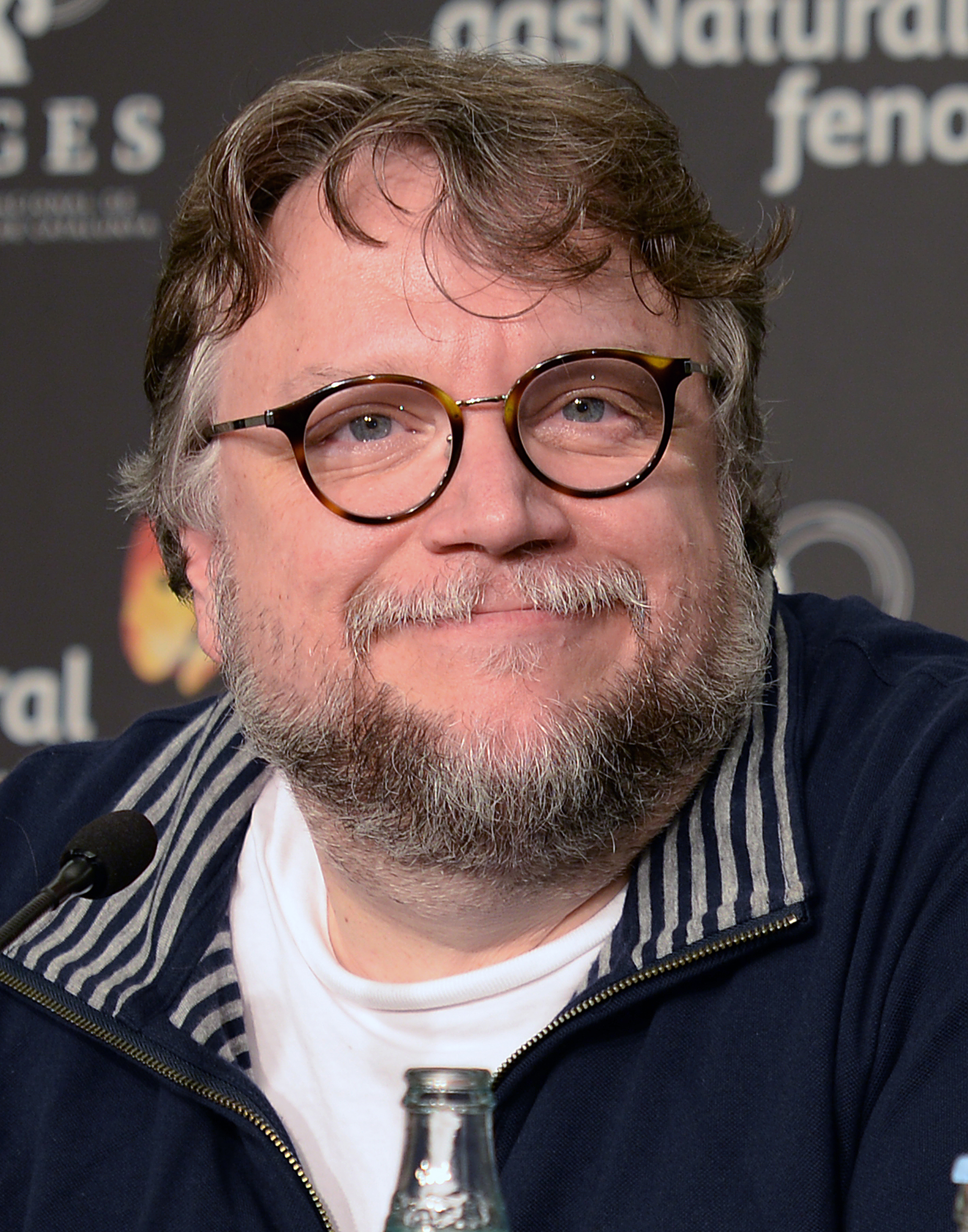
Mexican director Guillermo del Toro has won twice, for the films Cronos (1993) and El Laberinto del Fauno (2007).

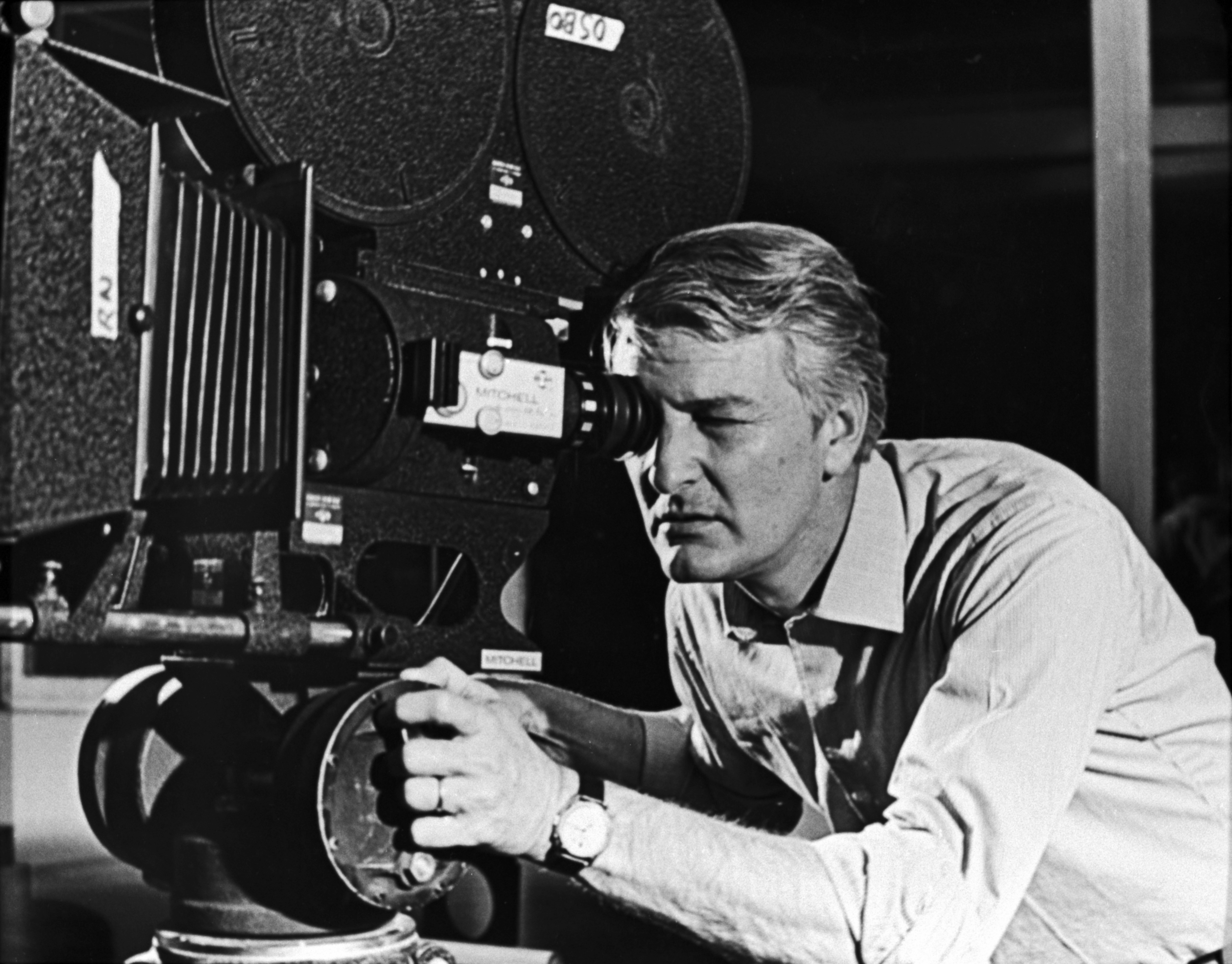
Alberto Isaac won for Mariana, Mariana (1988).

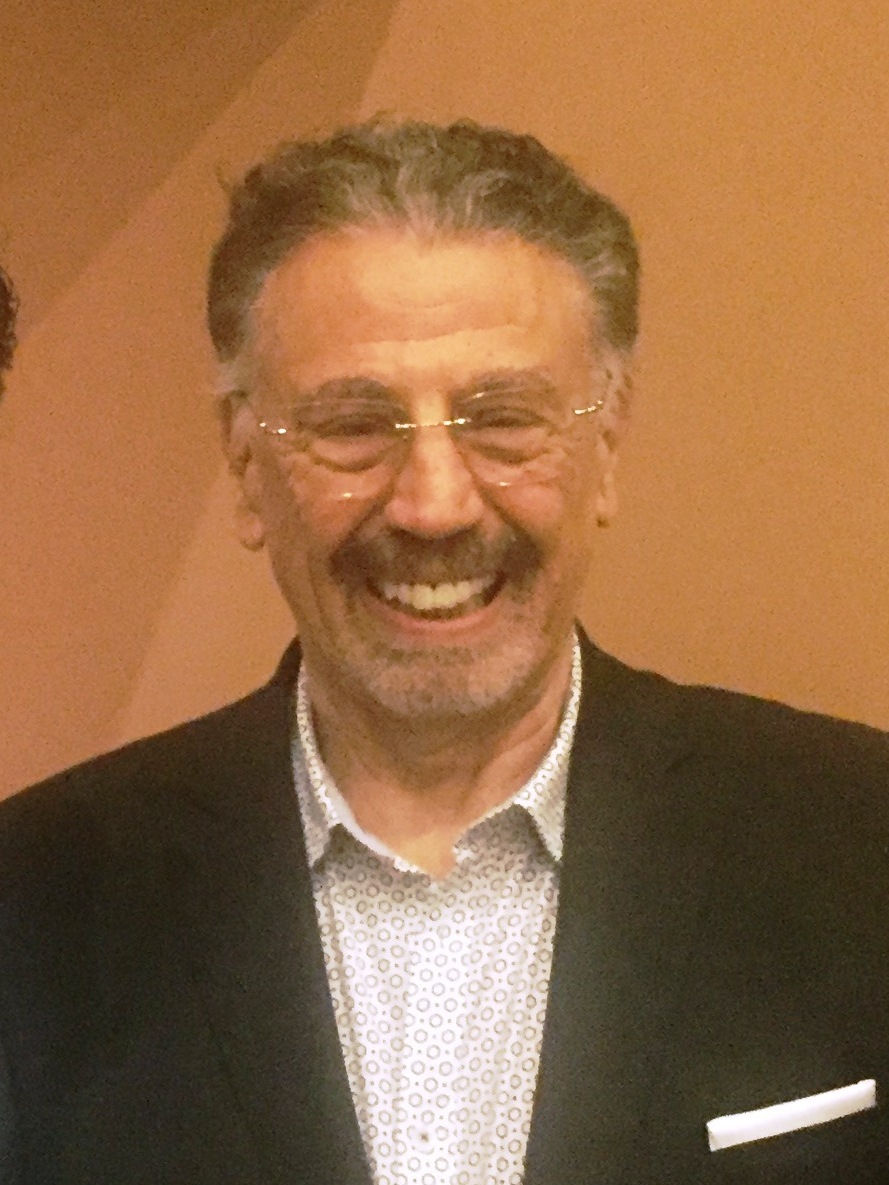
Mexican actor and director Alfonso Arau was nominated twice and won once in 1992 for Como Agua Para Chocolate.

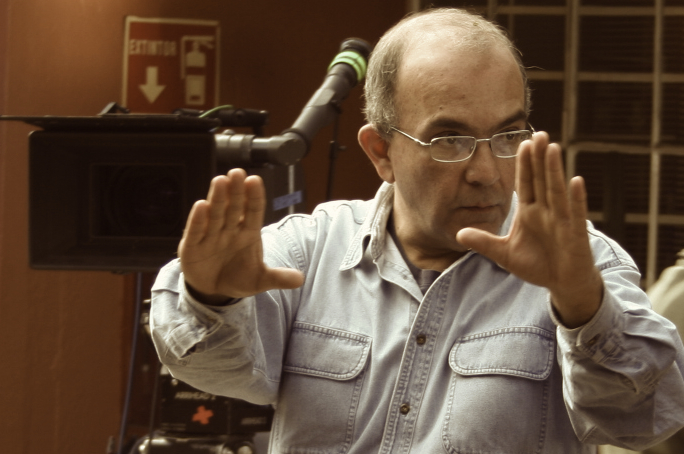
Rafael Montero won for Cilantro y Perejil (1997).

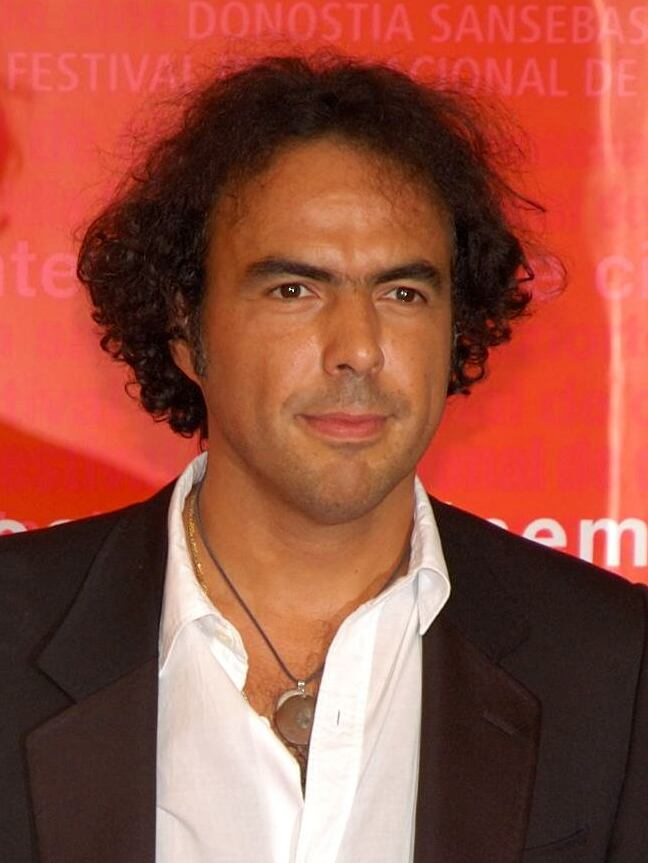
Alejandro G. Iñárritu won this award twice for Amores Perros (2001) and Bardo, falsa crónica de unas cuantas verdades (2023).

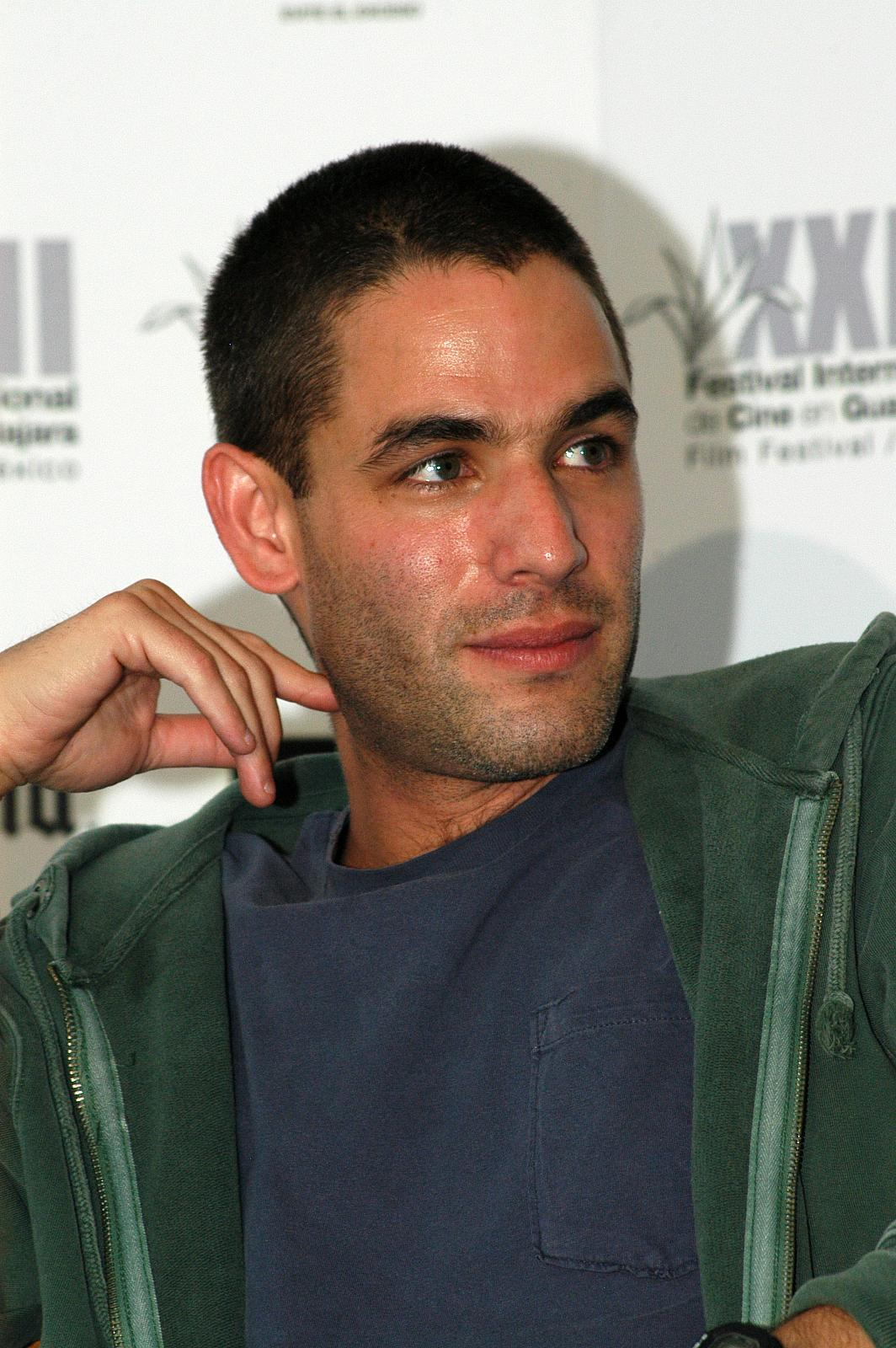
Fernando Eimbcke received the award twice, for the films Temporada de Patos (2005) and Lake Tahoe (2009).

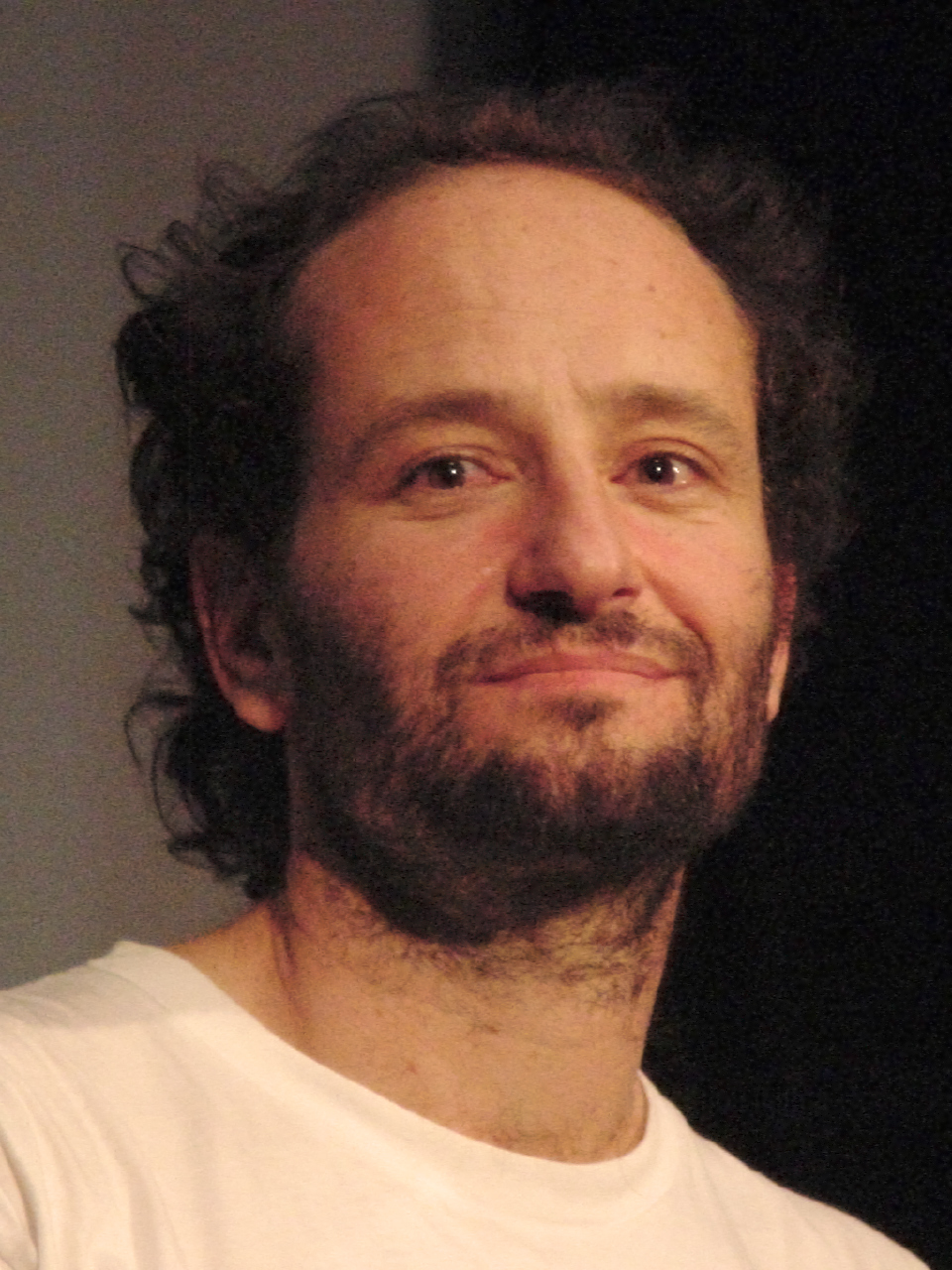
Carlos Reygadas received the award for Luz Silenciosa in 2008.

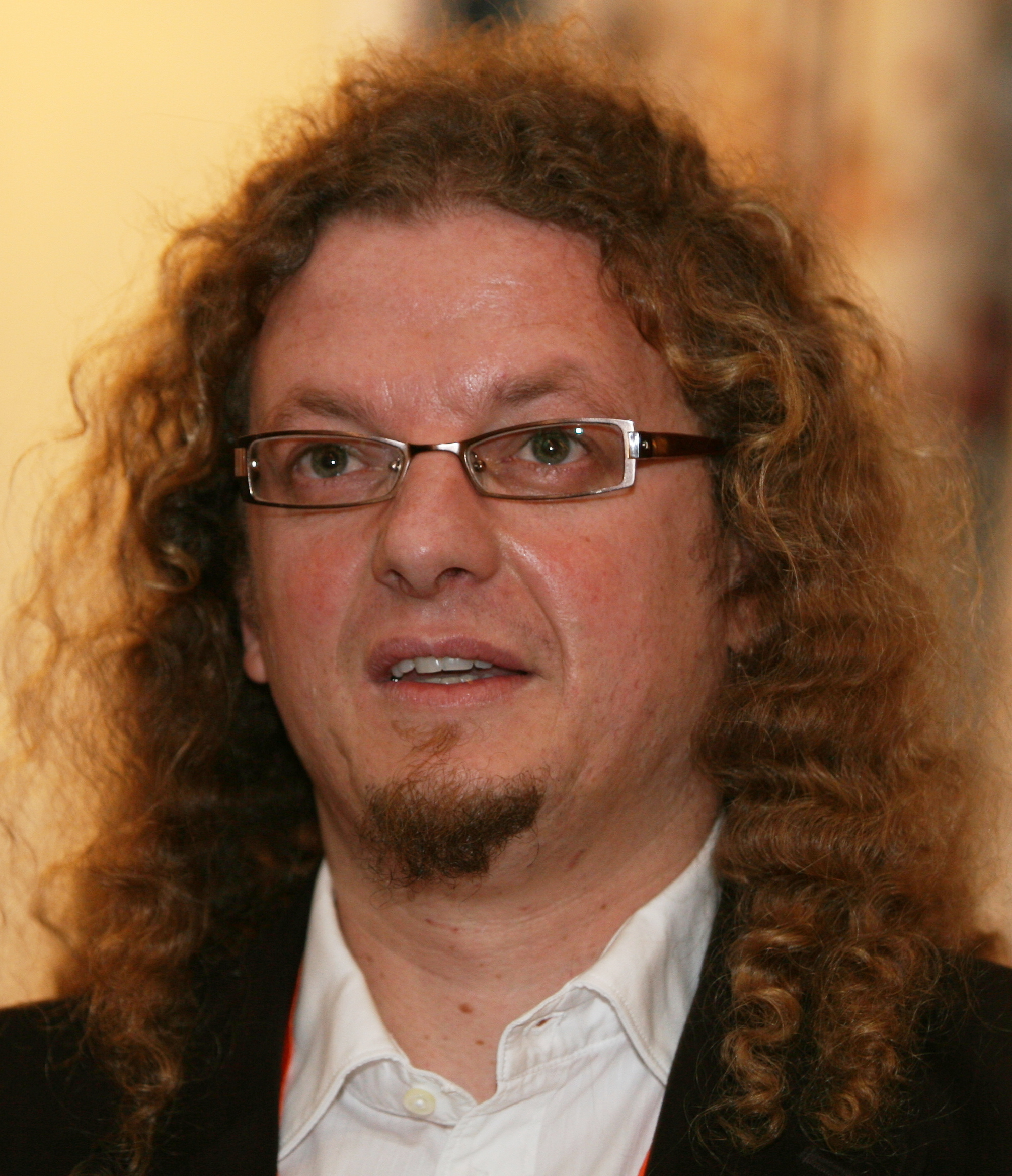
Rodrigo Plá has been nominated twice, winning for La Demora in 2013.

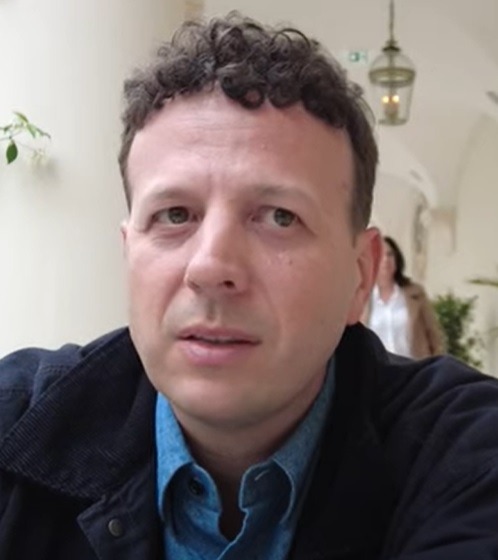
Amat Escalante received the award twice for Heli and La Región Salvaje.

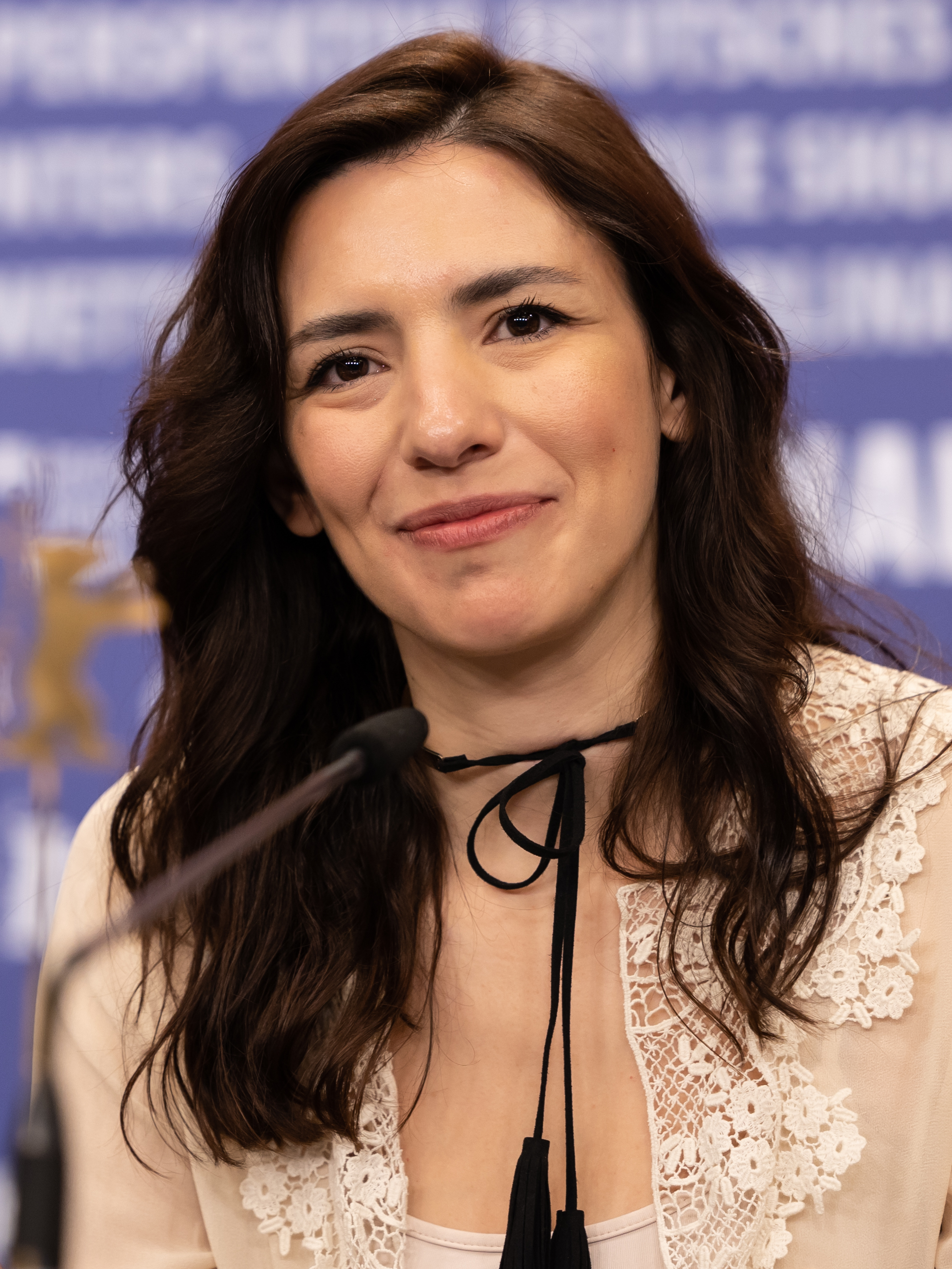
Lila Avilés won the award for Tótem in 2024.

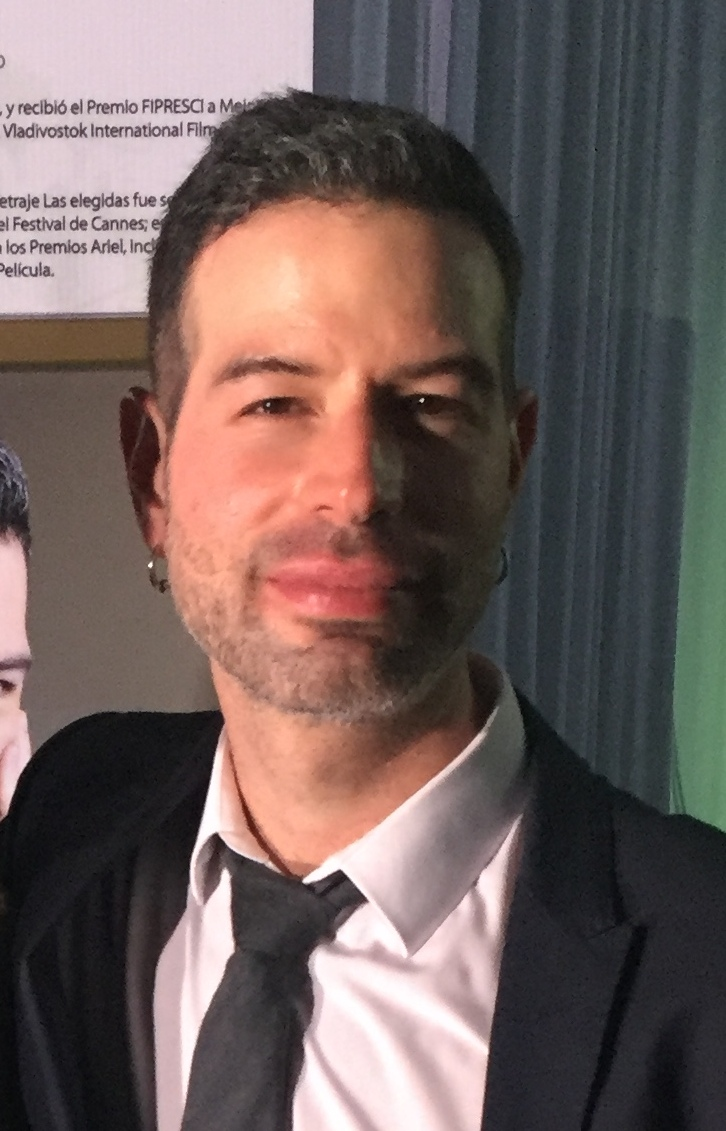
David Pablos won the award twice for Las Elegidas (2016) and En El Camino (2026).

Year	Director(s)	Film	Ref.
1947 (1st)	Roberto Gavaldón‡	La Barraca	
1947 (1st)	Julio Bracho	Crepúsculo	
1947 (1st)	Emilio "El Indio" Fernández	Las Abandonadas	
1947 (2nd)	Emilio "El Indio" Fernández‡	Enamorada	
1947 (2nd)	Julio Bracho	Cantaclaro	
1947 (2nd)	Roberto Gavaldón	La Otra	
1948 (3rd)	Emilio "El Indio" Fernández‡	La Perla	
1948 (3rd)	Antonio Momplet	El Buen Mozo	
1948 (3rd)	Miguel Zacarías	Soledad	
1949 (4th)	Emilio "El Indio" Fernández‡	Río Escondido	
1949 (4th)	Julio Bracho	Rosenda	
1949 (4th)	Ismael Rodríguez	Los Tres Huastecos	
1950 (5th)	Alejandro Galindo‡	Una Familia de Tantas	
1950 (5th)	Emilio "El Indio" Fernández	Pueblerina	
1950 (5th)	Miguel Zacarías	El Dolor de los Hijos	
1951 (6th)	Luis Buñuel‡	Los Olvidados	
1951 (6th)	Alfredo B. Crevenna	Otra Primavera	
1951 (6th)	Roberto Gavaldón	La Casa Chica	
1952 (7th)	Roberto Gavaldón‡	En La Palma de Tu Mano	
1952 (7th)	Julio Bracho	Paraíso Robado	
1952 (7th)	Alejandro Galindo	Doña Perfecta	
1953 (8th) (Note: In 1953, no winner was declared. Luis Buñuel, Alfredo B. Crevenna and Roberto Gavaldón remained as nominees.)	Luis Buñuel	Subida al Cielo	
1953 (8th)	Alfredo B. Crevenna	Mi Esposa y la Otra	
1953 (8th)	Roberto Gavaldón	El Rebozo de Soledad	
1954 (9th)	Roberto Gavaldón‡	El Niño y la Niebla	
1954 (9th)	Emilio Gómez Muriel	Un Divorcio	
1954 (9th)	Ismael Rodríguez	Pepe El Toro	
1955 (10th)	Alejandro Galindo‡	Los Fernández de Peralvillo	
1955 (10th)	Alfredo B. Crevenna	Orquídeas Para Mi Esposa	
1955 (10th)	Roberto Gavaldón	Sombra Verde	
1956 (11th)	Luis Buñuel‡	Robinson Crusoe	
1956 (11th)	Luis Buñuel	Ensayo de un Crimen	
1956 (11th)	Alfredo B. Crevenna	Una mujer en la calle	
1957 (12th)	Alfonso Corona Blake‡	El Camino de la Vida	
1957 (12th)	Roberto Gavaldón	La Escondida	
1957 (12th)	Emilio Gómez Muriel	¿Con Quién Andan Nuestras Hijas?	
1958 (13th)	Tito Davison‡	La Dulce Enemiga	
1958 (13th)	Tulio Demicheli	Feliz Año, Amor Mío	
1958 (13th)	Rogelio A. González	La Culta Dama	
1959—1971	Not awarded		
1972 (14th)	Jorge Fons‡	"Nosotros" (episode from Tú, Yo, Nosotros)	
1972 (14th)	Alfonso Arau	El Águila Descalza	
1972 (14th)	Salomón Láiter	La Puerta del Paraíso	
1973 (15th)	Luis Alcoriza‡	Mecánica Nacional	
1973 (15th)	Paul Leduc	Reed, México Insurgente	
1973 (15th)	Arturo Ripstein	El Castillo de la Pureza	
1974 (16th)	Gonzalo Martínez Ortega‡	El Principio	
1974 (16th)	Jorge Fons	"Caridad" (episode from Fé, Esperanza y Caridad)	
1974 (16th)	Alfredo Joskowicz	El Cambio	
1975 (17th)	Emilio "El Indio" Fernández‡	La Choca	
1975 (17th)	Luis Alcoriza	Presagio	
1975 (17th)	Juan Manuel Torres	La Otra Virginidad	
1976 (18th)	Miguel Littín‡	Actas de Marusia	
1976 (18th)	Felipe Cazals	Canoa	
1976 (18th)	Marcela Fernández Violante	De Todos Modos Juan Te Llamas	
1977 (19th)	Jaime Humberto Hermosillo‡	La Pasión Según Berenice	
1977 (19th)	Alberto Isaac	Cuartelazo	
1977 (19th)	Gonzalo Martínez Ortega	Longitud de Guerra	
1978 (20th)	Jaime Humberto Hermosillo‡	Naufragio	
1978 (20th)	Julián Pastor	Los Pequeños Privilegios	
1978 (20th)	Arturo Ripstein	En el Lugar Sin Limites	
1979 (21st)	Arturo Ripstein‡	Cadena Perpetua	
1979 (21st)	Jaime Humberto Hermosillo	Amor Libre	
1979 (21st)	Miguel Littín	El Recurso del Método	
1980 (22nd)	Felipe Cazals‡	El Año de la Peste	
1980 (22nd)	Raúl Araiza	Fuego en el Mar	
1980 (22nd)	Sergio Olhovich	El Infierno de Todos Tan Temido	
1981 (23rd)	Servando González‡	Las Grandes Aguas	
1981 (23rd)	Marcela Fernández Violante	Misterio	
1981 (23rd)	Julián Pastor	Morir de Madrugada	
1982 (24th)	Raúl Kamffer‡	¡Ora Si Tenemos Que Ganar!	
1982 (24th)	Alfredo Gurrola	Llámenme Mike	
1982 (24th)	Mario Hernández	Noche de Carnaval	
1983 (25th)	José Estrada‡	La Pachanga	
1983 (25th)	Alberto Isaac	Tiempo de Lobos	
1983 (25th)	Alfredo Gurrola	Días de Combate	
1984 (26th)	Felipe Cazals‡	Bajo la Metralla	
1984 (26th)	Arturo Ripstein	La Viuda Negra	
1984 (26th)	Ariel Zúñiga	El Diablo y la Dama	
1985 (27th)	Paul Leduc‡	Frida	
1985 (27th)	Juan Antonio de la Riva	Vidas Errantes	
1985 (27th)	Gerardo Pardo	De Veras Me Atrapaste	
1986 (28th)	Carlos Enrique Taboada‡	Veneno Para Las Hadas	
1986 (28th)	Felipe Cazals	Los Motivos de Luz	
1986 (28th)	Alfredo Gurrola	El Escuadrón de la Muerte	
1987 (29th)	Arturo Ripstein‡	El Imperio de la Fortuna	
1987 (29th)	Alberto Cortés	Amor a la Vuelta de la Esquina	
1987 (29th)	Diego López Rivera	Crónica de Familia	
1988 (30th)	Alberto Isaac‡	Mariana, Mariana	
1988 (30th)	Luis Alcoriza	Lo Que Importa es Vivir	
1988 (30th)	Alejandro Pelayo Rangel	Días Dificiles	
1989 (31st)	Sergio Olhovich‡	Esperanza	
1989 (31st)	Juan Fernando Pérez Gavilán	¿Nos Traicionará el Presidente?	
1989 (31st)	Sergio Véjar	La Jaula de Oro	
1990 (32nd)	Diego López Rivera‡	Goitia, Un Dios Para Sí Mismo	
1990 (32nd)	Gilberto Gazcón de Anda	Rosa de Dos Aromas	
1990 (32nd)	Alfonso Rosas Priego	El Homicida	
1991 (33rd)	Jorge Fons‡	Rojo Amanecer	
1991 (33rd)	Juan Antonio de la Riva	Pueblo de Madera	
1992 (34th)	Alfonso Arau‡	Como Agua Para Chocolate	
1992 (34th)	Carlos Carrera	La Mujer de Benjamín	
1992 (34th)	Maria Novaro	Danzón	
1993 (35th)	Guillermo del Toro‡	Cronos	
1993 (35th)	Rubén Gámez	Tequila	
1993 (35th)	Dana Rotberg	Ángel de Fuego	
1994 (36th)	José Luis García Agraz‡	Desiertos Mares	
1994 (36th)	Francisco Athié	Lolo	
1994 (36th)	Carlos Carrera	La Vida Conyugal	
1994 (36th)	Felipe Cazals	Kino	
1994 (36th)	Guita Schyfter	Novia Que Te Vea	
1995 (37th)	Jorge Fons‡	El Callejón de los Milagros	
1995 (37th)	Maria Novaro	El Jardín del Edén	
1995 (37th)	Gabriel Retes	Bienvenido — Welcome	
1995 (37th)	Fernando Sariñana	Hasta Morir	
1995 (37th)	Roberto Sneider	Dos Crimenes	
1996 (38th)	Carlos Carrera‡	Sin Remitente	
1996 (38th)	Oscar Blancarte	Dulces Compañías	
1996 (38th)	José Luis García Agraz	Salón México	
1996 (38th)	Daniel Gruener	Sobrenatural	
1996 (38th)	Alberto Isaac	Mujeres Insumisas	
1997 (39th)	Rafael Montero‡	Cilantro y Perejil	
1997 (39th)	Benjamín Cann	De Muerte Natural	
1997 (39th)	Marco Julio Linares	Juego Limpio	
1998 (40th)	Juan Pablo Villaseñor‡	Por Si No Te Vuelvo a Ver	
1998 (40th)	Juan Antonio de la Riva	Elisa Antes del Fin del Mundo	
1998 (40th)	Jaime Humberto Hermosillo	De Noche Vienes, Esmeralda	
1999 (41st)	Carlos Carrera‡	Un Embrujo	
1999 (41st)	Carlos Bolado	Bajo California, el Limite del Tiempo	
1999 (41st)	Arturo Ripstein	El Evangelio de las Maravillas	
2000 (42nd)	Luis Estrada‡	La Ley de Herodes	
2000 (42nd)	Juan Carlos Rulfo	Del Olvido al No Me Acuerdo	
2000 (42nd)	Oscar Urritua Lazo	Rito Terminal	
2001 (43rd)	Alejandro González Iñárritu‡	Amores Perros	
2001 (43rd)	Felipe Cazals	Su Alteza Serenísima	
2001 (43rd)	Maryse Sistach	Perfume de Violetas (Nadie te Oye)	
2002 (44th)	Ignacio Ortíz Cruz‡	Cuento de Hadas Para Dormir Cocodrilos	
2002 (44th)	Juan Antonio de la Riva	El Gavilán de la Sierra	
2002 (44th)	Gerardo Tort	De la Calle	
2003 (45th)	Carlos Carrera‡	El Crimen del Padre Amaro	
2003 (45th)	Jaime Humberto Hermosillo	eXXXorcismos	
2003 (45th)	Isaac P. Racine	Aro Tolbukhin: En la Mente del Asesino	
2003 (45th)	Agustí Villaronga	Aro Tolbukhin: En la Mente del Asesino	
2003 (45th)	Lydia Zimmermann	Aro Tolbukhin: En la Mente del Asesino	
2004 (46th)	José Luis García Agraz‡	El Misterio del Trinidad	
2004 (46th)	Carlos Reygadas	Japón	
2004 (46th)	Julián Hernández	Mil Nubes de Paz Cercan el Cielo, Amor, Jamás Acabarás de Ser Amor	
2005 (47th)	Fernando Eimbcke‡	Temporada de Patos	
2005 (47th)	José Buil	Manos Libres (Nadie te Habla)	
2005 (47th)	Luis Mandoki	Voces Inocentes	
2006 (48th)	Felipe Cazals‡	Las Vueltas del Citrillo	
2006 (48th)	Ignacio Ortíz Cruz	Mezcal	
2006 (48th)	Ricardo Benet	Noticias Lejanas	
2007 (49th)	Guillermo del Toro‡	El Laberinto del Fauno	
2007 (49th)	Sebastián Cordero	Crónicas	
2007 (49th)	Francisco Vargas Quevedo	El Violín	
2008 (50th)	Carlos Reygadas‡	Luz Silenciosa	
2008 (50th)	Everardo González	Los Ladrones Viejos	
2008 (50th)	Paul Leduc	Cobrador: In God We Trust	
2009 (51st)	Fernando Eimbcke‡	Lake Tahoe	
2009 (51st)	Eugenio Polgovsky	Los Herederos	
2009 (51st)	Gerardo Naranjo	I'm Gonna Explode	
2010 (52nd)	Carlos Carrera‡	Backyard: El Traspatio	
2010 (52nd)	Mariana Chenillo	Cinco Días Sin Nora	
2010 (52nd)	Alberto Cortés	Corazón del Tiempo	
2011 (53rd)	Luis Estrada‡	El Infierno	
2011 (53rd)	Felipe Cazals	Chicogrande	
2011 (53rd)	Diego Luna	Abel	
2012 (54th)	Emilio Portes‡	Pastorela	
2012 (54th)	Everardo Gout	Días de Gracia	
2012 (54th)	Gerardo Naranjo	Miss Bala	
2013 (55th)	Rodrigo Plá‡	La Demora	
2013 (55th)	Luis Mandoki	La vida precoz y breve de Sabina Rivas	
2013 (55th)	Paula Markovitch	El Premio	
2013 (55th)	Matías Meyer	Los Últimos Cristeros	
2014 (56th)	Amat Escalante‡	Heli	
2014 (56th)	Fernando Eimbcke	Club Sandwich	
2014 (56th)	Francisco Franco	Tercera Llamada	
2014 (56th)	Diego Quemada-Diez	La Jaula de Oro	
2014 (56th)	Claudia Sainte-Luce	Los Insólitos Peces Gato	
2015 (57th)	Alonso Ruizpalacios‡	Güeros	
2015 (57th)	Ernesto Contreras	Las Oscuras Primaveras	
2015 (57th)	Luis Estrada	La Dictadura Perfecta	
2015 (57th)	Rigoberto Perezcano	Carmín Tropical	
2015 (57th)	Jorge Ramírez-Suárez	Guten Tag, Ramón	
2016 (58th)	David Pablos‡	Las Elegidas	
2016 (58th)	Julio Hernández Cordón	Te Prometo Anarquía	
2016 (58th)	Rodrigo Plá	Un Monstruo de Mil Cabezas	
2016 (58th)	Gabriel Ripstein	600 Millas	
2016 (58th)	Anwar Safa	El Jeremías	
2017 (59th)	Tatiana Huezo‡	Tempestad	
2017 (59th)	Mitzi Vanessa Arreola and Amir Galván	La 4a Compañía	
2017 (59th)	Jonás Cuarón	Desierto	
2017 (59th)	Federico Cecchetti	El Sueño del Mara'akame	
2017 (59th)	Roberto Sneider	Me Estás Matando Susana	
2018 (60th)	Amat Escalante‡	La Región Salvaje	
2018 (60th)	Natalia Beristáin	Los Adioses	
2018 (60th)	Lucía Gajá	Batallas Íntimas	
2018 (60th)	Everardo González	La Libertad del Diablo	
2018 (60th)	Issa López	Vuelven	
2019 (61st)	Alfonso Cuarón‡	Roma	
2019 (61st)	Lila Avilés	La Camarista	
2019 (61st)	Alejandra Márquez Abella	Las Niñas Bien	
2019 (61st)	Carlos Reygadas	Nuestro Tiempo	
2019 (61st)	Alonso Ruizpalacios	Museo	
2020 (62nd)	Fernando Frías de la Parra‡	Ya No Estoy Aquí	
2020 (62nd)	Julio Hernández Cordón	Cómprame Un Revolver	
2020 (62nd)	Kenya Márquez	Asfixia	
2020 (62nd)	Hari Sama	Esto no es Berlín	
2020 (62nd)	José María Yazpik	Polvo	
2021 (63rd)	Fernanda Valadez‡	Sin Señas Particulares	
2021 (63rd)	Carlos Pérez Osorio	Las Tres Muertes de Marisela Escobedo	
2021 (63rd)	David Pablos	El baile de los 41	
2021 (63rd)	Samuel Kishi	Los Lobos	
2021 (63rd)	Yulene Olaizola	Selva Trágica	
2022 (64th)	Alonso Ruizpalacios‡	Una Película de Policías	
2022 (64th)	Ernesto Contreras	Cosas Imposibles	
2022 (64th)	Ángeles Cruz	Nudo Mixteco	
2022 (64th)	Tatiana Huezo	Noche de Fuego	
2022 (64th)	Arturo Ripstein	El Diablo Entre Las Piernas	
2023 (65th)	Alejandro González Iñárritu‡	Bardo, falsa crónica de unas cuantas verdades	
2023 (65th)	Natalia Beristáin	Ruido	
2023 (65th)	Michelle Garza Cervera	Huesera	
2023 (65th)	Alejandra Márquez Abella	El Norte Sobre el Vacío	
2023 (65th)	Lucía Puenzo	La Caída	
2024 (66th)	Lila Avilés	Tótem	
2024 (66th)	Rodrigo García	Familia	
2024 (66th)	Tatiana Huezo	El Eco	
2024 (66th)	Elisa Miller	Temporada de Huracanes	
2024 (66th)	David Zonana	Heroico	
2025 (67th)	Astrid Rondero and Fernanda Valadez	Sujo	
2025 (67th)	Urzula Barba Hopfner	Corina	
2025 (67th)	Rodrigo Prieto	Pedro Páramo	
2025 (67th)	Alonso Ruizpalacios	La Cocina	
2025 (67th)	Pierre Saint Martin	We Shall Not Be Moved	
2026 (68th)	David Pablos	En El Camino	
2026 (68th)	Pablo Pérez Lombardini	La Reserva	
2026 (68th)	Lucía Gajá	Vidas en la orilla	
2026 (68th)	Ernesto Martínez Bucio	El diablo fuma (y guarda las cabezas de los cerillos quemados en la misma caja)	
2026 (68th)	Gabriel Mascaro	O Último Azul	

== Multiple wins and nominations ==
The following individuals have received multiple Best Director awards:

Wins	Director
4	Carlos Carrera
4	Emilio "El Indio" Fernández
3	Felipe Cazals
3	Jorge Fons
3	Roberto Gavaldón
2	Luis Buñuel
2	Guillermo del Toro
2	Fernando Eimbcke
2	Amat Escalante
2	Luis Estrada
2	Alejandro Galindo
2	José Luis García Agraz
2	Alejandro González Iñarritu
2	Jaime Húmberto Hermosillo
2	David Pablos
2	Arturo Ripstein
2	Alonso Ruizpalacios
2	Fernanda Valadez

The following directors received four or more Best Director nominations:

Nominations	Director
8	Felipe Cazals
8	Roberto Gavaldón
7	Arturo Ripstein
6	Carlos Carrera
6	Emilio "El Indio" Fernández
4	Julio Bracho
4	Luis Buñuel
4	Alfredo B. Crevenna
4	Juan Antonio de la Riva
4	Jorge Fons
4	Alberto Isaac
4	Alonso Ruizpalacios

== See also ==
- Academy Award for Best Director
- Best Director Award (Cannes Film Festival)
