= 36th Ariel Awards =

1994 Mexican film awards

- Date: June 6, 1994

Highlights
- Best Picture: Principio y Fin
- Most awards: Principio y Fin (7)
- Most nominations: Novia Que Te Vea (16)

The 36th Ariel Awards ceremony, organized by the Mexican Academy of Film Arts and Sciences (AMACC) took place on June 6, 1994, in Mexico City. During the ceremony, AMACC presented the Ariel Award in 24 categories honoring films released in 1993. Principio y Fin received seven awards out of 14 nominations, including Best Picture. Novia Que Te Vea followed with five awards; Ambar with four; and Desiertos Mares won two for Best Director and Best Original Story.

== Winners and nominees ==
Winners are listed first and highlighted with boldface.

**Best Picture**: **Principio y Fin**; Desiertos Mares; La Vida Conyugal; Novia Que Te Vea	**Best Director**: **José Luis García Agraz** – **Desiertos Mares**; Francisco Athié – Lolo; Carlos Carrera – La Vida Conyugal; Felipe Cazals – Kino; Guita Schytfer – Novia Que Te Vea
**Best Actor**: **Bruno Bichir** – **Principio y Fin**; Rodolfo de Anda – Kino; Alonso Echánove – La Vida Conyugal; Arturo Ríos – Desiertos Martes; Jorge Russek – La Ǘltima Batalla; Roberto Sosa – Lolo	**Best Actress**: **Lucía Muñoz** – **Principio y Fin**; Socorro Bonilla – La Vida Conyugal; Julieta Egurrola – Principio y Fin; Claudette Maillé – Novia Que Te Vea; Maya Mishalska – Novia Que Te Vea
**Best Supporting Actor**: **Damián Alcázar** – **Lolo**; Pedro Armendáriz – Guerrero Negro; Fernando Balzaretti – Kino; Juan Carlos Colombo – Desiertos Mares; Alberto Estrella – Principio y Fin	**Best Supporting Actress**: **Angélica Aragón** – **Novia Que Te Vea**; Ada Carrasco – Un Año Perdido; Luisa Huertas – Principio y Fin; Verónica Langer – Novia Que Te Vea; Regina Orozco – Dama de Noche
**Best Actor in a Minor Role**: **Luis Felipe Tovar** – **Principio y Fin**; Demián Bichir – La Vida Conyugal; Ernesto Gómez Cruz – Vagabunda; Aarón Hernán – Kino; Leslie Hoffman – Novia Que Te Vea	**Best Actress in a Minor Role**: **Blanca Guerra** – **Principio y Fin**; Angélica Aragón – Ambar; Lisa Owen – Desiertos Mares; Alicia Montoya – Lolo; Mercedes Pascual – Novia Que Te Vea
**Best Original Story**: **Desiertos Mares** – **José Luis García Agraz**; Guerrero Negro – Francisco Sánchez and Raúl Araiza; La Ǘltima Batalla – Fernando Galiana; Novia Que Te Vea – Guita Schyfter, Hugo Hiriart and Rosa Nissan; Un Año Perdido – Gerardo Lara	**Best Screenplay**: **Novia Que Te Vea** – **Hugo Hiriart**; Desiertos Mares – Ignacio Ortíz Cruz and José Luis García Agraz; Guerrero Negro – Francisco Sánchez and Raúl Araiza; La Vida Conyugal – Carlos Carrera and Ignacio Ortíz Cruz; Lolo – Francisco Athié
**Best First Feature Film**: **Novia Que Te Vea** – **Guita Schyfter**; Dama de Noche – Eva López-Sánchez; Lolo – Francisco Athié; Un Año Perdido – Gerardo Lara	**Best Documentary Feature**: **La Línea** – **Ernesto Rimoch**
**Best Live Action Short Film**: **El Héroe** – **Carlos Carrera**; Hoy No Circula (Un Día Sin Auto) – Rafael Montero and Víctor Ugalde; Peor Es Nada – Javier Bourges	**Best Documentary Short Subject**: **Recordar es Vivir (1955-1959)** – **Alfredo Joskowicz**; Déjalo Ser (1970-1974) – Busi Cortés; No Se Olvida (1965-1969) – Manuel Martínez
**Best Original Score**: **Kino – Amparo Rubín**; Dama de Noche – José Elorza; Desiertos Mares – Alejandro Giacomán and Diego Herrera; Lolo – Juan Cristobal Pérez Grobet; Novia Que Te Vea – Joaquín Gutiérrez Heras	**Best Original Music Theme or Song**: **"Las Piedras Rodantes" from Un Año Perdido** – Alejandro Lora; Kino – Amparo Rubín; Principio y Fin – Lucía Álvarez; Vagabunda – Nelson Velázquez
**Best Cinematography**: **Ambar** – **Emmanuel Lubezki**; Desiertos Mares – Carlos Marcovich; Kino – Ángel Goded; Novia Que Te Vea – Toni Kuhn; Principio y Fin – Claudio Rocha	**Best Film Editing**: **Principio y Fin** – **Rafael Castanedo**; Desiertos Mares – Manuel Hinojosa and José Luis García Agraz; Kino – Carlos Savage; Novia Que Te Vea – Carlos Bolado
**Best Production Design**: **Ambar** – **Mónica Chirinos, Guillermo Hulsz, Claudio Pache Contreras, Salvador Parra, and Ana Solares**; Desiertos Mares – Carmen Giménez Cacho; Lolo – Marisa Pecanins; Principio y Fin – Myrko Serbolov	**Best Set Design**: **Principio y Fin** – **Marisa Pecanins**; Ambar – Brigitte Broch; Desiertos Mares – Carmen Giménez Cacho; Lolo – Marisa Pecanins
**Best Costume Design**: **Novia Que Te Vea** – **Mariestela Fernández**; Ambar – Mariestela Fernández; Dama de Noche – Cristina Alcaine; Kino – Rosario Candela; La Vida Conyugal – Mara González	**Best Makeup**: **Ambar** – **Francisco Franco**; Guerrero Negro – Teresa Patterson; Lolo – Carlos Sánchez and Eduardo Gómez; Novia Que Te Vea – Gabriela Ovalle
**Best Sound**: **Novia Que Te Vea** – **Salvador de la Fuente**; Ambar – Nerio Barberis, Salvador de la Fuente, Luis Estrada and Aurora Ojeda Coronado; Kino – Oscar Mateos; Lolo – Antonio Diego; Principio y Fin – David Baksht	**Best Special Effects**: **Ambar** – **Alejandro Vázquez**; Dama de Noche – Jorge Jara; Desiertos Mares – Alejandro Vázquez; Kino – Miguel Vázquez; Lolo – Alejandro Vázquez

== Special awards ==
- Golden Ariel – Adalberto Martínez and Gregorio Walerstein
- Salvador Toscano Medal – Gunther Gerzso
- Special recognition – Gilberto Martínez Solares

== Multiple nominations and awards ==
The following eleven films received multiple nominations:

Nominations	Film
16	Novia Que Te Vea
14	Principio y Fin
12	Desiertos Mares
11	Lolo
10	Kino
8	Ambar
7	La Vida Conyugal
4	Dama de Noche
4	Guerrero Negro
2	La Última Batalla
2	Vagabunda

Films that received multiple awards:

Awards	Film
7	Principio y Fin
5	Novia Que Te Vea
4	Ambar
2	Desiertos Mares
