= 55th Ariel Awards =

2013 Mexican film awards

- Date: 2013

Highlights
- Best Picture: El Premio
- Most awards: El Premio (4)
- Most nominations: La vida precoz y breve de Sabina Rivas (11)

The 55th Ariel Awards ceremony, organized by the Mexican Academy of Film Arts and Sciences (AMACC) took place in 2013, in Mexico City. During the ceremony, AMACC presented the Ariel Award in 23 categories honoring films released in 2012. La vida precoz y breve de Sabina Rivas received eleven nominations and won three awards including Best Supporting Actress for Angelina Peláez. El Premio was named Best Picture and Rodrigo Plá was awarded Best Director.

== Awards ==
Winners are listed first and highlighted with boldface

**Best Picture**: **El Premio** – Kung Works; La Demora – Lulú Producciones; Los Últimos Cristeros – Luc, la película	**Best Director**: **Rodrigo Plá – La Demora**; Luis Mandoki – La vida precoz y breve de Sabina Rivas; Paula Markovitch – El Premio; Matías Meyer – Los Últimos Cristeros
**Best Actor**: **Roberto Sosa – El Fantástico Mundo de Juan Orol as Juan Orol**; Francisco Cruz – Entre la Noche y el Día as Francisco Cruz; Hernán Mendoza – Después de Lucía as Roberto; Carlos Vallarino – La Demora as Agustín	**Best Actress**: **Úrsula Pruneda – El Sueño de Lú** **as Lucía**; Roxana Blanco – La Demora as María; Paula Galinelli Hertzog – El Premio as Cecilia "Ceci" Edelstein; Tessa Ia – Después de Lucía as Alejandra; Greisy Mena – La vida precoz y breve de Sabina Rivas as Sabina Rivas
**Best Supporting Actor**: **Daniel Giménez Cacho** – **Colosio: El Asesinato as José María Córdoba Montoya**; Dagoberto Gama – Colosio: El Asesinato as Comandante Benítez; Luis Rodríguez – Los Mejores Temas as Emilio; Gerardo Trejoluna – El Sueño de Lú as Malik	**Best Supporting Actress**: **Angelina Peláez** – **La vida precoz y breve de Sabina Rivas as Doña Lita**; Sharon Herrera – El Premio as Silvia; Mari Carmen Farías – El Sueño de Lú as Laura
**Best Original Screenplay**: **El Premio – Paula Markovitch**; Después de Lucía – Michel Franco; Todo el Mundo Tiene a Alguien Menos Yo – Raúl Fuentes	**Best Adapted Screenplay**: **La Demora – Laura Santullo from the novel La Espera by Laura Santullo**; La vida precoz y breve de Sabina Rivas – Diana Cardozo from La Mara by Rafael Ramírez Heredia; Los Últimos Cristeros – Israel Cárdenas and Matías Meyer from Rescoldo: Los Últimos Cristeros by Antonio Estrada
**Best Ibero-American Film**: **Blancanieves (Spain) – Pablo Berger**; No (Chile) – Pablo Larraín; Pescador (Ecuador) – Sebastián Cordero	**Best First Feature Film**: **El Premio – Paula Markovitch**; El Fantástico Mundo de Juan Orol – Sebastián del Amo; Todo el Mundo Tiene a Alguien Menos Yo – Raúl Fuentes
**Best Documentary Feature**: **Cuates de Australia – Everardo González**; Carrière 250 Metros – Juan Carlos Rulfo and Natalia Gil; El Paciente Interno – Alejandro Solar; La Revolución de los Alcatraces – Luciana Kaplan; Palabras Mágicas (Para Romper Un Encantamiento) – Mercedes Moncada	**Best Documentary Short Subject**: **La Herida Se Mantiene Abierta – Alberto Cortés**; Las Montañas Invisibles – Ángel Linares; Mitote – Eugenio Polgovsky; Paal – Christoph Müller and Víctor Vargas Villafuerte
**Best Animated Short**: **La Noria – Karla Castañeda**; Como Perros y Gatos – Armando Vega; Dame Posada – Cecilio Vargas; Un Ojo – Lorenzo Manrique	**Best Live Action Short**: **La Tiricia o Cómo Curar la Tristeza – Ángeles Cruz**; Lucy Contra los Límites de la Voz – Mónica Herrera; Para Armar Un Helicóptero – Izabel Acevedo
**Best Original Score**: **Carrière 250 Metros – Jacobo Lieberman and Leonardo Heiblum**; La vida precoz y breve de Sabina Rivas – Alejandro Castaños; Los Últimos Cristeros – Galo Durán	**Best Sound**: **Cuates de Australia – Matías Barberis, Jaime Baksht and Pablo Tamez**; El Sueño de Lú – Samuel Larson, Alfredo Loaeza, Pedro Mejía, Miguel Ángel Molina and Pablo Tamez; La vida precoz y breve de Sabina Rivas – Fernando Cámara and Martin Hernández; Los Últimos Cristeros – Alejandro de Icaza and Raúl Locatelli
**Best Film Editing**: **El Premio – Paula Markovitch, Lorena Moriconi and Mariana Rodríguez**; Carrière 250 Metros – Valentina Leduc; Los Últimos Cristeros – León Felipe González	**Best Art Direction**: **La vida precoz y breve de Sabina Rivas – Antonio Muñohierro**; Cristiada – Salvador Parra; El Premio – Bárbara Enríquez and Óscar Tello
**Best Cinematography**: **El Fantástico Mundo de Juan Orol – Carlos Hidalgo**; El Premio – Wojciech Staroń; La Demora – María José Secco; La vida precoz y breve de Sabina Rivas – Damián García; Todo el Mundo Tiene a Alguien Menos Yo – Jerónimo Rodríguez	**Best Makeup**: **Colosio: El Asesinato – Alfredo Tigre Mora**; Depositarios – David Ruiz Gameros; La vida precoz y breve de Sabina Rivas – Alfredo García and Carla Tinoco; Los Últimos Cristeros – Iñaki Legaspi
**Best Costume Design**: **El Fantástico Mundo de Juan Orol – Deborah Medina**; El Premio – Victoria Pugliese; La vida precoz y breve de Sabina Rivas – Adela Cortázar; Los Últimos Cristeros – Nohemí González	**Best Special Effects**: **La vida precoz y breve de Sabina Rivas – Adrián Durán**; Depositarios – Efeccine Mobile, Alejandro Vázquez, Guillermo Jiménez, and Salvador Servin; Morelos – Alejandro Vázquez and Jorge Sergio Jara
**Best Visual Effects**: **Depositarios – Alejandro Berea and Víctor Velázquez**; Colosio: El Asesinato – Gabriel Kerlegand; Morelos – Leandro Visconti

== Multiple nominations and awards ==
The following films received multiple nominations:

Nominations	Film
11	La vida precoz y breve de Sabina Rivas
10	El Premio
8	Los Últimos Cristeros
6	La Demora
4	Colosio: El Asesinato
4	El Sueño de Lú
4	El Fantástico Mundo de Juan Orol
3	Carrière 250 Metros
3	Depositarios
3	Después de Lucía
3	Todo el Mundo Tiene a Alguien Menos Yo
2	Cuates de Australia
2	Morelos

Films that received multiple awards:

Awards	Film
4	El Premio
3	El Fantástico Mundo de Juan Orol
3	La vida precoz y breve de Sabina Rivas
2	Colosio: El Asesinato
2	Cuates de Australia
2	La Demora
