= 47th Ariel Awards =

2005 Mexican film awards

The XLVII Award of the Premio Ariel (2005) of the Academia Mexicana de Artes y Ciencias Cinematográficas took place on March 29 of 2005 at the Palacio de Bellas Artes. The Premio Ariel for the best movie was awarded to Temporada de patos.

== Best film ==
=== Winner ===
Temporada de patos

Producers: Lulú Producciones, Cine Pantera, Fondo de inversión y estímulos al cine (Fidecine) and Instituto Mexicano de Cinematografía (Imcine)

=== Nominees ===
- Manos libres (Nadie te habla)

Producers: Producciones Tragaluz, Fondo de inversión y estímulos al cine (Fidecine)

- Voces inocentes

Producers: Altavista Films, Organización Santo Domingo, Luis Mandoki Productions, Lawrence Bender Productions, Muvi Films and Toonxtudios

== Best director ==
=== Winner ===
Fernando Eimbcke for Temporada de patos

=== Nominees ===
- José Buil for Manos libres (Nadie te habla)
- Luis Mandoki for Voces inocentes

== Best Iberoamerican film ==
=== Winner ===
Whisky by Pablo Stoll and Juan Pablo Rebella (Uruguay)

=== Nominees ===
- Machuca by Andrés Wood (Chile)
- Te doy mis ojos by Icíar Bollaín (Spain)

== Opera Prima ==
=== Winner ===
Temporada de patos of Fernando Eimbcke

=== Nominees ===
- Adán y Eva (Todavía) of Iván Ávila Dueñas
- Santos peregrinos of Juan Carlos Carrasco

== Best cinematography ==
=== Winner ===
Alexis Zabé por Temporada de patos

=== Nominees ===
- Alejandro Cantú & Ciro Cabello for Adán y Eva (Todavía)
- Juan Ruiz Anchía for Voces inocentes

== Best actress ==
=== Winner ===
Danny Perea for Temporada de patos

=== Nominees ===
- Ana Paula Corpus for Manos libres (Nadie te habla)
- Leonor Varela for Voces inocentes
- Vanessa Bauche for Digna... hasta el último aliento

== Best actor ==
=== Winner ===
Enrique Arreola for Temporada de patos

=== Nominees ===
- Silverio Palacios for Cero y van cuatro
- Alejandro Calva for Manos libres (Nadie te habla)

== Best supporting actress ==
=== Winner ===
Ofelia Medina for Voces inocentes

=== Nominees ===
- Yuriria del Valle for Manos libres (Nadie te habla)
- Paloma Woolrich for Santos peregrinos

== Best supporting actor ==
=== Winner ===
Carlos Cobos for Conejo en la luna

=== Nominees ===
- Raúl Méndez for Matando Cabos
- Joaquín Cosío for Matando Cabos

== Best documentary ==
=== Winner ===
Digna... hasta el último aliento of Felipe Cazals

=== Nominees ===
- Los niños de Morelia of Juan Pablo Villaseñor
- Trópico de cáncer of Eugenio Polgovsky

== Best Opera Prima documentary ==
=== Winner ===
Trópico de cáncer of Eugenio Polgovsky

=== Nominees ===
- Milagros concedidos of Andrea Álvarez & Luciana Kaplan
- Relatos desde el encierro of Guadalupe Miranda

== Best short documentary ==
=== Winner ===
Soy of Lucía Gajá

=== Nominees ===
- El blues de Paganini of David Villalvazo & Yordi Capó
- La vida no vale nada of Eduardo González Ibarra
- Tierra caliente... se mueren los que la mueven of Francisco Vargas

== Best short film ==
=== Winner ===
- Un viaje of Gabriela Monroy

=== Nominees ===
- El otro sueño americano of Enrique Arroyo
- La Nao de China of Patricia Arriaga

== Best animation short ==
=== Winner ===
De raíz of Carlos Carrera

=== Nominees ===
- La guerra of Rubén Silva
- La historia de todos of Blanca Aguerre

== Best original script ==
=== Winner ===
Fernando Eimbcke for Temporada de patos

=== Nominees ===
- Iván Ávila Dueñas for Adán y Eva (Todavía)
- Jorge Ramírez-Suárez for Conejo en la luna
- José Buil for Manos libres (Nadie te habla)

== Best adaptation ==
=== Winner ===
María Elena Velasco, Iván Lipkies & Ivette Lipkies for Huapango

== Best original score ==
=== Winner ===
Alejandro Rosso & Liquits for Temporada de patos

=== Nominees ===
- Rosino Serrano for Adán y Eva (Todavía)
- Eduardo Gamboa for Conejo en la luna

== Best sound ==
=== Winner ===
Lena Esquenazi, Miguel Hernández & Antonio Diego for Temporada de patos

=== Nominees ===
- Carlos Aguilar & Ernesto Gaytán for Manos libres (Nadie te habla)
- Jaime Baksht & Fernando Cámara for Voces inocentes

== Best art design ==
=== Winner ===
Diana Quiroz & Luisa Guala for Temporada de patos

=== Nominees ===
- Ivonne Fuentes for Adán y Eva (Todavía)
- Antonio Muñohierro & Luisa Guala por Voces inocentes

== Best make-up ==
=== Winner ===
David Ruiz Gameros for Voces inocentes

=== Nominees ===
- Maripaz Robles for Adán y Eva (Todavía)
- Carlos Sánchez, Carmen de la Torre & Roberto Ortiz por Matando Cabos

== Best wardrobe ==
=== Winner ===
Junior Paulino & Lourdes del Valle por Adán y Eva (Todavía)

=== Nominees ===
- Alejandra Dorantes for Manos libres (Nadie te habla)
- Lissi de la Concha for Temporada de patos

== Best editing ==
=== Winner ===
Mariana Rodríguez for Temporada de patos

=== Nominees ===
- Alberto de Toro for Matando Cabos
- Aleshka Ferrero for Voces inocentes

== Best special effects ==
=== Winner ===
Jesús Durán for Voces inocentes

=== Nominees ===
- Edgar Lezama "Chivata" for Manos libres (Nadie te habla)
- Alejandro Vázquez & Edgar Lezama "Chivata" for Matando Cabos

== Awards per movie ==
- Temporada de patos (11)

Best film, director, edition, art design, sound, original score, original screenplay, actor, actress, cinematography and Opera Prima

- Voces inocentes (3)

Best special effects, make-up, supporting actress

- Adán y Eva (1)

Best wardrobe

- Huapango (1)

Best adaptation

- De raíz (1)

Best animation short

- Un viaje (1)

Best short film

- Soy (1)

Best short documentary

- Trópico de cáncer (1)

Best Opera Prima documentary

- Digna... hasta el último aliento (1)

Best documentary

- Conejo en la luna (1)

Best supporting actress

- Whisky (1)

Best Iberoamerican film
