= ¿Quién es el señor López? =

2006 film by Luis Mandoki

- Directed by: Luis Mandoki
- Written by: Luis Mandoki
- Produced by: Astillero Films, S.A. de C.V.
- Distributed by: International VideoMarket
- Release date: February 2006
- Running time: 50 min.
- Language: Spanish
- Budget: (no commercial takings)

¿Quién es el señor López? (Spanish for "Who is Mr. Lopez?") is a 2006 film made by film director Luis Mandoki. It is a political non-fiction film about the 2006 and 2012 Mexican presidential candidate Andrés Manuel López Obrador and the 2006 Mexican general election.

The five-DVD documentary includes interviews with López Obrador and with journalists and academics, including Denise Dresser (ITAM), Lorenzo Meyer (COLMEX); the lawyers Néstor de Buen, Javier Quijano and Juventino Castro y Castro, all of them sympathizers with the Revolutionary Democratic Party of the candidate.

The film author has given his work a copyleft licence. It can be distributed at no cost.
