= Digna... hasta el último aliento =

- Directed by: Felipe Cazals
- Written by: Felipe Cazals
- Produced by: Academia Mexicana de Derechos Humanos; Grupo de Comunicación Publicorp; Conaculta-IMCINE; Luis Kelly; Vicente Silva
- Starring: Vanessa Bauche
- Music by: Alejandro Rosso
- Release date: 17 December 2004 (Mexico)
- Running time: 118 min.
- Country: Mexico
- Language: Spanish

Digna... hasta el último aliento ("Digna (dignified)... until the last breath") is a Mexican film released in 2003.

This documentary is about Digna Ochoa Plácido, a human rights activist. She had died under mysterious circumstances in 2001 in Mexico City, following her kidnapping by the federal police in 1999. It was presented at the Guadalajara and Berlin Film Festivals. It won the Ariel Award in 2005 in the category of Best Feature Length Documentary ("Mejor Largometraje Documental") for Felipe Cazals. It was also nominated for the Ariel Award for the Best Actress (Vanessa Bauche).

== Plot ==
The story of the film covers part of the life of the lawyer and social activist Digna Ochoa, from her first kidnapping in August 1988 to her death in October 2001. The film presents more than sixty testimonies from criminologists, journalists (Blanche Petrich and Miguel Ángel Granados Chapa), human rights defenders (Emilio Álvarez Icaza), clergymen, police, social activists, the attorney general of Mexico City (Bernardo Bátiz), as well as Digna Ochoa's family and friends, while the actors who take part in the film dramatise the events of her life.

== Technical data ==
Felipe Cazals was the director and writer of the script. The film was scored by Alejandro Rosso. The cinematography was by Hugo Díaz and Miguel Garzón, and the sound was by Pedro Villalobos. It was produced by the Consejo Nacional para la Cultura y las Artes (Conaculta), the Instituto Mexicano de Cinematografía (IMCINE), the Academia Mexicana de Derechos Humanos and the Grupo de Comunicación Publicorp. The producers were Luis Kelly and Vicente Silva. The feature-length television report edited by Moisés Carrillo has a running time of 117 minutes.

The film was presented at the Berlin International Film Festival, the Malaga Spanish Film Festival and the Guadalajara International Film Festival. It was commercially released in Mexico on 17 December 2004.

== See also ==
- List of Mexican films
- Human Rights in Mexico
