= El año de la peste =

1978 Mexican film

- Directed by: Felipe Cazals
- Written by: Gabriel García Márquez; José Agustín; Juan Arturo Brennan
- Based on: A Journal of the Plague Year by Daniel Defoe
- Produced by: Felipe Cazals
- Starring: Alejandro Parodi; José Carlos Ruiz; Rebeca Silva; Tito Junco
- Cinematography: Javier Cruz
- Edited by: Raúl Caso
- Music by: Laura Quiroz
- Production company: Conacite Dos
- Distributed by: IMCINE
- Release date: 12 February 1978
- Running time: 109 minutes
- Country: Mexico
- Language: Spanish

El Año de la Peste (English: The Year of the Plague) is a Mexican film categorized as drama, thriller and sci-fi. It was filmed in 1978 and released in 1979. The production counted with the famous Colombian writer Gabriel García Márquez for the adapted screenplay from the novel of Daniel Defoe A Journal of the Plague Year published in March 1722.

== Synopsis ==
A dreadful sickness is found in a Mexican town. A doctor tries to alert the authorities when he discovers its epidemic nature. No one listens to him and soon the illness spreads. The government tries to manage the information in order to prevent terror.

== Cast ==
- Alejandro Parodi as Dr. Pedro Sierra Genovés
- José Carlos Ruiz as Dr. Jorge Martínez Abasolo
- Rebeca Silva as Eva Aponte
- Tito Junco as President of Mexico
- Ignacio Retes as Dr. Mario Zermeño
- Eduardo Alcaraz as Dr. Luis Mario Zavala
- Héctor Godoy as Luis Armando Torreros
- Humberto Elizondo as R. C. Jiménez
- Leonor Llausás as Álvaro's widow
- Zully Keith as Magadalena
- Nora Larraga as Health inspector
- Arlette Pacheco as News reporter
- María Barber as President's wife
- Daniela Romo as Laura

== Awards ==
Date	Award	Category	Recipients and nominees	Result
27 October 1970	Ariel Awards	Golden Ariel	Felipe Cazals	Won
27 October 1970	Ariel Awards	Best Direction	Felipe Cazals	Won
27 October 1970	Ariel Awards	Best Screenplay	Gabriel García Márquez; Juan Arturo Brennan	Won
18 May 1980	Mexican Cinema Journalists	Best Screenplay, Adapted	Gabriel García Márquez; Juan Arturo Brennan	Won
