= La vida precoz y breve de Sabina Rivas =

- Mexican theatrical release poster
- Directed by: Luis Mandoki
- Screenplay by: Diana Cardozo
- Produced by: Abraham Zabludovsky; Gerardo Barrera; Perla Ciuk
- Starring: Greisy Mena; Angelina Peláez
- Cinematography: Damián García
- Edited by: Mariana Rodríguez
- Music by: Alejandro Castaños; Pablo Valero
- Release date: November 9, 2012
- Running time: 116 minutes
- Country: Mexico
- Language: Spanish

La vida precoz y breve de Sabina Rivas (lit. 'The precocious and brief life of Sabina Rivas') is a 2012 Mexican drama film directed by Luis Mandoki. The film received eleven nominations at the 55th Ariel Awards including Best Director for Mandoki.

== Plot ==
Young Honduran teenagers, Sabina and Jovany, see each other again on the Mexican-Guatemalan border, after being apart for several years. She is working in a sleazy strip joint but wants to get to the United States and to be a great singer; he has become a member of la Mara Salvatrucha, a violent gang.

At the border, they must cope with exploitation and harassment in a society dominated by brothel matrons and pimps, consular officials, immigration authorities, the army and la Mara Salvatrucha. Those in power organise drug trafficking; those lower down the pecking order also benefit from pimping or exploit illegal migrants.

Sabina goes through a rough time and a complicated relationship with Jovany in attempt to cross the United States border and become a famous singer. She makes a career in a strip joint making money by stripping and singing in front of the crowds. She is often also frequently paid to entertain at parties. The corrupt border control officers that work at the border between the countries of Guatemala and Mexico throw parties at the border that Sabina is responsible for entertaining. She uses these opportunities to attempt to cross the border, but she is always denied. She also gets mistreated by the border control and is even raped by one of the officers. This officer violently rapes her as well as strangles her with his belt. There is many hardships that Sabina has to overcome in her attempts to cross the border and eventually enter the United States to pursue her singing career.

== Cast ==
- Greisy Mena as Sabina Rivas
- Joaquín Cosío as Burrona
- Fernando Moreno as Jovany
- Angelina Peláez as Doña Lita
- Mario Zaragoza as Sarabia
- Beto Benitez as Añorve
- Nick Chinlund as Patrick
- Miguel Flores as Don Nico
- Argél Galindo as Poisson
- Tenoch Huerta Mejía as Juan
- Dagoberto Gama as General Valderrama
- Luis Eduardo Yee as Pedro
- Tito Vasconcelos as Presentador Tijuanita
- José Sefami as Cossío
- Asur Zagada as Thalía

== Awards and nominations ==
Award / Film Festival	Date of ceremony	Category	Recipient(s) and nominee(s)	Result	Ref(s)
Ariel Awards	2013	Best Director	Luis Mandoki	Nominated	
Ariel Awards	2013	Best Actress	Greisy Mena	Nominated	
Ariel Awards	2013	Best Supporting Actress	Angelina Peláez	Won	
Ariel Awards	2013	Best Adapted Screenplay	Diana Cardozo	Nominated	
Ariel Awards	2013	Best Cinematography	Damián García	Nominated	
Ariel Awards	2013	Best Sound	Martin Hernández and Fernando Cámara	Nominated	
Ariel Awards	2013	Best Original Score	Alejandro Castaños	Nominated	
Ariel Awards	2013	Best Art Direction	Antonio Muñohierro	Won	
Ariel Awards	2013	Best Costume Design	Adela Cortázar	Nominated	
Ariel Awards	2013	Best Makeup	Alfredo García and Carla Tinoco	Nominated	
Ariel Awards	2013	Best Special Effects	Adrián Durán	Won	
