= Bajo la metralla =

- Directed by: Felipe Cazals
- Screenplay by: Xavier Robles
- Based on: A Journal of the Plague Year by Daniel Defoe The Just Assassins by Albert Camus
- Produced by: Héctor López
- Starring: Humberto Zurita; María Rojo; José Carlos Ruiz; Manuel Ojeda
- Cinematography: Daniel López
- Edited by: Rafael Ceballos
- Music by: Leonardo Velázquez
- Distributed by: IMCINE
- Release date: 17 November 1983
- Running time: 102 minutes
- Country: Mexico
- Language: Spanish

Bajo la metralla (English: Under the shrapnel) is a 1983 Mexican thriller film directed by Felipe Cazals. It tells the story of a guerilla group that hides in a safe house with a hostage after a failed attack on a government official. The film is loosely based on the play The Just Assassins by Albert Camus.

The film received the 1984 Ariel Awards for Best Picture, Director, Best Actor for Humberto Zurita and Best Editing for Rafael Ceballos. It was also nominated for Best Supporting Actress (Beatriz Marín), Best Music and Best Set Design.

== Plot ==
A guerrilla group commanded by Pedro (Humberto Zurita) tries to kidnap a senior government official but things go wrong and there are several casualties, including policemen and a guerrilla member. By chance, Pedro encounters Pablo (Manuel Ojeda), a former colleague, and the group decides to kidnap Pablo to prevent him from blowing the whistle.

== Cast ==
- Humberto Zurita as Pedro / Mateo
- María Rojo as María
- José Carlos Ruiz as Martín
- Manuel Ojeda as Pablo
- Salvador Sánchez as Tomás
- Alejandro Camacho as Andrés
- Beatriz Marín as Marta
- Gerardo Vigil as Juan
- Aurora Alonso as Carlota Serrano de Durazo
- José Antonio Estrada as Col. José Ramírez
