= The Last Christeros =

- Mexican theatrical release poster
- Spanish: Los últimos cristeros
- Directed by: Matías Meyer
- Written by: Matías Meyer; Israel Cárdenas
- Produced by: Matías Meyer; Israel Cárdenas
- Edited by: León Felipe González
- Music by: Galo Durán
- Production companies: LUC La Película; Axolote Cine
- Release dates: September 11, 2011 (Toronto); September 21, 2012
- Running time: 89 minutes
- Countries: Mexico; Netherlands
- Language: Spanish

The Last Christeros (Spanish: Los Últimos Cristeros) is a 2011 Mexican Western drama film, produced, directed and written by Matías Meyer.

The film premiered at the 2011 Toronto International Film Festival. The film received eight nominations at the 55th Ariel Awards including Best Picture and Best Director for Meyer.

== Awards and nominations ==
Award / Film Festival	Date of ceremony	Category	Recipients	Result	Ref.
Ariel Awards	2013	Best Picture	LUC Producciones	Nominated	
Ariel Awards	2013	Best Director	Matías Meyer	Nominated	
Ariel Awards	2013	Best Adapted Screenplay	Matías Meyer and Israel Cárdenas	Nominated	
Ariel Awards	2013	Best Editing	León Felipe González	Nominated	
Ariel Awards	2013	Best Sound	Alejandro de Icaza and Raúl Locatelli	Nominated	
Ariel Awards	2013	Best Original Score	Galo Durán	Nominated	
Ariel Awards	2013	Best Costume Design	Nohemí González	Nominated	
Ariel Awards	2013	Best Makeup	Iñaki Legaspi	Nominated	
