= Those Years =

1973 film

- Directed by: Felipe Cazals
- Written by: Felipe Cazals; Carlos Fuentes
- Starring: Jorge Martínez de Hoyos
- Cinematography: Jorge Stahl Jr.
- Release date: July 1973
- Running time: 142 minutes
- Country: Mexico
- Language: Spanish

Those Years (Spanish: Aquellos años) is a 1973 Mexican drama film directed by Felipe Cazals. It was entered into the 8th Moscow International Film Festival where it won a Special Prize.

== Cast ==
- Jorge Martínez de Hoyos as Benito Juárez
- Helena Rojo as Empress Carlota
- Paco Morayta as Emperor Maximilian
- Julián Pastor as Jesús González Ortega
- Salvador Sánchez as General Melchor Ocampo
- David Silva as General Leonardo Márquez
- Gonzalo Vega as General Ignacio Zaragoza
- Mario Almada as Mariano Escobedo
- Pancho Córdova as Jecker
- Roberto Dumont as Napoleón III
- Enrique Lucero as Juan Nepomuceno Almonte
