= The Fantastic World of Juan Orol =

- Theatrical release poster
- Directed by: Sebastián del Amo
- Written by: Sebastián del Amo; Raúl Fernández Espinosa
- Produced by: Isabel Aerenlund; Alejandro Blazquez de Nicolas; Paola Herrera; Carmen Ortega Casanovas
- Starring: Roberto Sosa
- Cinematography: Carlos Hidalgo
- Edited by: Sebastian del Amo; Branko Gomez Palacio; Felipe Gomez; Martin Luis Guzman
- Music by: Francisco Albisua
- Production company: Celuliode Films
- Release dates: March 5, 2012 (FICG); June 2012 (GIFF); September 14, 2012 (Mexico)
- Running time: 90 minutes
- Country: Mexico
- Language: Spanish

The Fantastic World of Juan Orol (Spanish: El fantástico mundo de Juan Orol) is a 2012 Mexican black-and-white biographical comedy-drama film directed by Sebastián del Amo (in his directorial debut) and written by Del Amo & Raúl Fernández Espinosa. Starring Roberto Sosa. It was named on the shortlist for Mexico's entry for the Academy Award for Best Foreign Language Film at the 85th Academy Awards, but it was not selected.

== Premise ==
The film is based on the life of Juan Orol, a man of Galician origin who, after various adventures, arrives in Mexico to become a creator in different film genres, including gangster films and rumberas films, some being successes at the box office despite very negative reviews. He has been called the great involuntary Surrealist.

== Cast ==
The actors participating in this film are:

- Roberto Sosa as Juan Orol
- Gabriela de la Garza as Mary Esquivel
- Fernanda Romero as Dinora
- Jesús Ochoa as General Cruz
- Ximena Rubio as Rosa Carmina
- Juan Manuel Bernal as Kodak salesman
- Alfonso Borbolla as Quirico Michelena
- Alberto Estrella as Emilio 'El indio' Fernández
- Julio Bracho as Policeman
- Roberto Wohlmuth as Don Gabriel
- Karin Burnett as María Antonieta Pons
- Ariadna Perez Mijares as Ninón Sevilla
- Mauricio Galaz as Arnoldo Orol
- Juan Carlos Bonet as Orol's friend
- Rodrigo Cachero as Memo Alcaine
- Rodrigo Corea as Usher
- Roger Cudney as Don Guillermo
- Sebastián del Amo as Firing Squad Leader
- Jean Duverger as Black Baseball Player
- Claudia Silki as Hippie
- Yolanda 'Tongolele' Montes as Herself

== Release ==
The Fantastic World of Juan Orol had its world premiere on March 5, 2012, at the Guadalajara International Film Festival, then participated at the end of June of the same year at the Guanajuato International Film Festival as part of the official selection. It had its commercial premiere on September 14, 2012, in Mexican theaters.

== Accolades ==
Year	Award / Festival	Category	Recipient	Result	Ref.
2012	Guadalajara International Film Festival	Best First Work	Sebastián del Amo	Won	
2012	Guanajuato International Film Festival	Best First Mexican Feature Film - Special Mention	Sebastián del Amo	Won	
2012	Hola México Film Festival	Best Film	Sebastián del Amo	Won	
2012	Hola México Film Festival	Best Director	Sebastián del Amo	Won	
2012	Hermosillo International Film Festival	Best Mexican Feature Film	Sebastián del Amo	Won	
2012	The Festival Pantalla de Cristal	Best Film	Sebastián del Amo	Won	
2012	The Festival Pantalla de Cristal	Best Director	Sebastián del Amo	Nominated	
2012	The Festival Pantalla de Cristal	Best Script	Sebastián del Amo & Raúl Fernández Espinosa	Won	
2012	The Festival Pantalla de Cristal	Best Actor	Roberto Sosa	Won	
2012	The Festival Pantalla de Cristal	Best Supporting Actor	Jesús Ochoa	Won	
2012	The Festival Pantalla de Cristal	Best Supporting Actor	Alberto Estrella	Nominated	
2012	The Festival Pantalla de Cristal	Best Cinematography	Carlos Hidalgo	Nominated	
2012	The Festival Pantalla de Cristal	Best Investigation	Sebastián del Amo	Nominated	
2012	The Festival Pantalla de Cristal	Best Production Values	Alejandro Blazquez de Nicolas	Won	
2012	The Festival Pantalla de Cristal	Best Post Production	Branko Andrés Gómez-Palacio, Gustavo Bellón & Francisco Gómezíaz	Won	
2012	The Festival Pantalla de Cristal	Best Original Soundtrack	Sebastián del Amo	Won	
2012	The Festival Pantalla de Cristal	Best Sound Design	Alejandro de Icaza	Won	
2012	The Festival Pantalla de Cristal	Best Editing	Felipe Gómez & Martín Luis Guzmám	Nominated	
2012	The Festival Pantalla de Cristal	Best Art Direction	Christopher Lagunes	Won	
2012	The Festival Pantalla de Cristal	Best Casting	Sebastián del Amo	Nominated	
2012	The Festival Pantalla de Cristal	Best Makeup	Mari Paz Robles	Won	
2013	Canacine Awards	Best Actor	Roberto Sosa	Nominated	
2013	22x Don Luis Film Festival	Best Director	Sebastián del Amo	Won	
2013	22x Don Luis Film Festival	Best Actor	Roberto Sosa	Won	
2013	Diosas de Plata	Best Film	Alejandro Blazquez de Nicolas	Nominated	
2013	Diosas de Plata	Best Actor	Roberto Sosa	Nominated	
2013	Diosas de Plata	Best Actor in a Minor Role	Jesús Ochoa	Nominated	
2013	Diosas de Plata	Best Cinematography	Carlos Hidalgo	Won	
2013	Diosas de Plata	Best Editing	Martin Luis Guzman & Felipe Gomez	Won	
2013	Ariel Awards	Best First Work	Sebastián del Amo	Nominated	
2013	Ariel Awards	Best Actor	Roberto Sosa	Won	
2013	Ariel Awards	Best Cinematography	Carlos Hidalgo	Won	
2013	Ariel Awards	Best Costume Design	Deborah Medina	Won	
2013	Beijing International Film Festival	Tiantan Award	Sebastián del Amo	Won	
