= Juventino Castro y Castro =

Mexican judge and politician

- Born: 16 July 1918; Nuevo Laredo, Tamaulipas, Mexico
- Died: 8 April 2012 (aged 93); Mexico City, Mexico
- Occupation: Politician
- Political party: PRD

Juventino Víctor Castro y Castro (16 July 1918 – 8 April 2012) was a Mexican judge and politician from the Party of the Democratic Revolution who served as Minister of the Supreme Court of Justice of the Nation from 1995 to 2003 and as its President from 1995 to 1997. From 2009 to 2012 he served as Deputy of the LXI Legislature of the Mexican Congress representing the State of Mexico.
