= José Luis García Agraz =

Mexican director, producer, and screenwriter (born 1952)

- Born: José Luis García Agraz; November 16, 1952 (age 73); Mexico City
- Education: Centro Universitario de Estudios Cinematográficos / UNAM
- Occupations: Film Director, screenwriter, editor
- Years active: 1975–present

José Luis García Agraz (born 16 November 1952) is an Ariel Award-winning Mexican film director, screenwriter, editor and producer known for his Desiertos Mares, Nocaut (Knockout) and El misterio del Trinidad. He is also an educator of cinema studies at Centro de Capacitación Cinematográfica (or CCC) in Coyoacán, and for a period of years beginning in 2007 was the managing director of Estudios Churubusco, one of Mexico's most important film production facilities.

His first feature-length film, Nocaut (1984) won the Ariel Award for Best Debut Feature Film and was nominated for Best Picture. It also won Best Film at the El Heraldo de México Awards and the Diosas de Plata. In addition, the film was selected to screen at FIFAM in Amiens (France), and other festivals in Madrid and New York City.

After its Hollywood screening at the 3rd annual American Cinematheque festival hosted by Grauman's Egyptian Theater, the Los Angeles Times described El Misterio del Trinidad as, "an original and satisfying family drama, an unraveling of a string of family secrets that enables Garcia Agraz to consider how much we actually know about our relatives, “El Misterio” has plenty of emotion, lots of revelations and even adventure but never lapses into soap opera. It is as distinctive and impressive as Garcia Agraz’s heady, intoxicating “Salon Mexico,” about a mid-’30s crime of passion told from conflicting points of view, “Rashomon”-style."

== Nocaut and The Crisis Generation ==
In the 1980s, the Mexican film industry had slowed considerably after José López Portillo y Pachecho's presidency, paving way to a generation of filmmakers, whom Alejandro Pelayo described as the crisis generation, young risk-takers who made films at all costs. From there emerged film cooperatives that began creating emerging cinema. Starting in 1978, José Luis García Agraz began working on the Nocaut's storyboards. "I had one of those sketchbooks, and I had it lined up with all my little drawings for Nocaut, from the first shot of the chess game to the last scene," he recounted. For more than five years, he sent the script to various directors, producers, and actors to see if anyone would take on the project. Most replied that they would consider making it, but with a different director. "Back then, the world for first time directors was dark, but we young creatives found a way to form cooperatives." Fernando Cámara, along with Nerio Barberis, Toño Betancourt, Marcelo Lacarino, and Güero Castro, created the Kinam cooperative to make the film. "What we didn't want was for it to resemble Mexican commercial films," the filmmaker pointed out. "There was a need to make Mexican film noir; that's what I bet on at that time, and I think it worked in that sense." Directors Luis Estrada (Hell) and Alfonso Cuarón (Roma) were his production assistants on the project.

== Early Life and Inspiration ==
Born and raised in Mexico City, after high school José Luis García Agraz studied at the Centro Universitario de Estudios Cinematográficos (or CUEC) at UNAM. A fan of Samuel Fuller's films and influenced by directors Jorge Fons, Felipe Cazals, and José Estrada, he began his film career while still attending university. His 1986 project Yo te amo Catalina was shown in several international festivals in America and Europe, and won the Straw Deer Award for "Best Picture" at the Tashkent International Film Festival, in Russia. García Agraz co-adapted with Gerardo de la Torre and Pedro Armendáriz Yo te amo Catalina. Between 1987 and 1990 he directed several short films for mexfam and, on television, the TV series Tony Tijuana from 1989 to 1990. His short film Ladrón de sábado (Appendix:Cinema in 1990), distributed only on video, was based on a screenplay by Gabriel García Márquez and Consuelo Garrido. García Agraz co-adapted with Gerardo de la Torre and Pedro Armendáriz Yo te amo Catalina. Between 1987 and 1990 he directed several short films for MEXFAM and the Television series Tony Tijuana from 1989 to 1990. His short film Ladrón de sábado, was based on a screenplay by Gabriel García Márquez and Consuelo Garrido.

== Personal life ==
José Luis García Agraz is the brother of filmmaker Carlos García Agraz and the father of director Natalia García Agraz. He is a relative of writer Gabriel Agraz García de Alba and engineer Juan Salvador Agraz. He is the father of director Natalia García Agraz. He was a member of the National System of Art Creators from 1993 to 2000.

== Filmography ==
- 1984: Nocaut
- 1986: Yo te amo Catalina
- 1987: Treasure of the Moon Goddess
- 1987: Noche de Califas
- 1990: La Secta del Sargón
- 1990: Buscando al culpable
- 1991: Pelearon Diez Rounds
- 1991: Dentro de la Noche
- 1995: Desiertos mares
- 1996: Salón México
- 2004: El misterio del Trinidad
- 2004: Harry Potter and the Prisoner of Azkaban (director of Spanish language dubbing)

== Television ==
- 2013: El Señor de los Cielos for Telemundo
- 2017: Ingobernable for Netflix

== Short Films ==
- 1987: Noche de Califas
- 1987: Saxofón
- 1988: Solamente una vez
- 1990: Ladrón de sábado
- 1990: La Secta del Sargón
- 1990: Buscando al culpable
- 1996" El último tren

== Awards ==
- 1983: Silver Ariel - Best Short Fiction Film, Patricio
- 1984: Golden Ariel Award - Best Debut Feature, Nocaut
- 1984: Golden Ariel Award - Best Film (nominated), Nocaut
- 1994: Silver Ariel Award - Best Director, Desiertos mares
- 1994: Silver Ariel Award - Best Original Story, Desiertos mares
- 1994: Golden Ariel Award - Best Film (nominated), Desiertos mares
- 1994: Silver Ariel Award - Best Screenplay (nominated), Desiertos mares
- 1994: Silver Ariel Award - Best Editing (nominated), Desiertos
- 1996 Silver Ariel Award - Best Director (nominated), Salón México
- 2004: Silver Ariel Award - Best Director, El misterio del Trinidad
- 2004: Silver Ariel Award - Best Original Screenplay (nominated), El misterio del Trinidad
