= Voces inocentes =

2004 film

Voces Inocentes
- Theatrical release poster
- Directed by: Luis Mandoki
- Written by: Luis Mandoki; Óscar Orlando Torres
- Based on: Óscar Torres's childhood
- Produced by: Lawrence Bender; Luis Mandoki; Alejandro Soberón Kuri
- Starring: Carlos Padilla; Leonor Varela; Xuna Primus
- Cinematography: Juan Ruiz Anchía
- Edited by: Aleshka Ferrero
- Music by: André Abujamra
- Production companies: Santo Domingo Films; Lawrence Bender Productions; MUVI Films; Altavista Films
- Distributed by: Lionsgate (El Salvador; theatrical); 20th Century Fox (international); Polychrome Pictures (U.S.A release)
- Release dates: 16 September 2004 (Toronto Film Festival); 28 January 2005 (Mexico); 14 November 2005 (United States)
- Running time: 106 minutes
- Countries: Mexico; El Salvador
- Language: Spanish
- Box office: $5,044,000 $837,000 (United States)

Voces Inocentes (English title: Innocent Voices) is a 2004 war drama film directed by Luis Mandoki. The plot is set during the Salvadoran Civil War, and is based on writer Óscar Torres's childhood. The film serves as a general commentary on the military use of children. The movie also shows injustice against innocent people who are forced to fight in the war. It follows the story of the narrator, a boy named Chava. The film was also selected as the Mexican entry for the Best Foreign Language Oscar at the 77th Academy Awards, but it did not make the final shortlist.

== Plot ==
In 1986, Chava is a young 11-year-old boy from El Salvador. His father escaped to the United States at the start of the civil war when he was only 5. His family lives in a small town of Cuscatancingo that is currently heavily fought over between the Salvadoran army and the El Salvador guerrillas. His mother makes a living for the family by sewing, and Chava sells the clothes in shops. When he's not in school, Chava works for a bus driver announcing stations for him as a part-time service to help his family with money.

He is nearing his twelfth birthday, when the Salvadoran military forces will recruit him into active service against the guerillas. Chava witnesses the army recruiting twelve-year-old children from his school inside, and also witnesses a 10-year-old recruited when he trips another boy as a bad prank on him, and he is violently restrained after he tries to run away, and his teacher is almost shot while trying to defend him.

One day, his uncle Beto, who has joined the guerrillas, comes to visit Chava's family. Beto wants to take Chava with him so the military can't recruit him, but Chava's mother is against it. Beto gives a radio to Chava and tells him how to listen to the guerrillas' banned radio station, Venceremos. Throughout the scenes in the village where they live, there are firefights between government and rebel forces, as the settlement is on the border of the conflict. Chava knowingly plays a song banned by the Salvadoran Army in front of the soldiers, but the town's priest saves him by playing the same song over the church's loudspeaker, focusing the soldier's attention away from Chava.

During class, Chava falls in love with a girl in his class named Cristina Maria. The guerrillas attack the army from the school building and the school is closed. Kella and her family move out of town to her mother's house in a safer area. One of the guerrillas, Raton, tells Chava of the army's next recruitment day, and Chava and his friends warn the entire town to hide their children. Chava decides to visit Cristina Maria but only finds the bombed-out shell of her house. He and his friends decide to join the guerrillas, but they are followed and the guerrilla camp is attacked by the army.

Chava and his friends are taken from the camp, and forcibly marched to an unknown destination, repeating the opening scene. It appears to be an execution ground on a riverbank, where other bodies litter the scene. Ancha, the mentally handicapped local from Chava's village is seen to have been hanged. The soldiers begin to shoot the boys one by one, and two of them are killed. Chava is next in turn, but at the last moment he is saved by a guerrilla attack. He runs back into the undergrowth right into a raging firefight. After seeing a guerrilla get killed by a government soldier, Chava feels he should fight against them. He picks up the rifle, but realizes the government soldier is another young boy whom he knew in school. He cannot bring himself to kill his old friend, another human. He flees, and the camera shows the boy he was aiming at, who realizes that his life was in another child's hands. Chava runs home to find his mother in the burnt out ruins of their house. She decides to send him to the United States to prevent him being caught by the authorities, and he promises to return and rescue his brother before he too turns twelve.

In 1992, six years later, it is shown that he also rescued his brother and brought him into the United States, and the war has ended.

== Cast ==
- Carlos Padilla as Chava
- Leonor Varela as Kella
- José María Yazpik as Uncle Beto
- Ofelia Medina as Mama Toya
- Ana Paulina Caceres as Rosita
- Xuna Primus as Cristina Maria
- Daniel Giménez Cacho as Priest
- Adrián Alonso as Chele
- Jesús Ochoa as Chofer
- Paulina Gaitán as Angelita
- Gustavo Muñoz as Ancha

== Release ==
This film premiered at the 2004 Toronto International Film Festival on 16 September 2004, before being released in Mexico on 28 January 2005. It later received a limited release in the United States on 14 October 2005.

== Reception ==
=== Critical response ===
This film received favorable reviews from film critics. Based on 51 reviews collected by review aggregate site Rotten Tomatoes, the film scored a 73% "Fresh" approval rating, with an average rating of 6.8/10. The site's critical consensus is, "Innocent Voices is a passionately told dramatization of an ugly issue of war -- its impact on children." Metacritic, another review aggregator which assigns a weighted mean rating out of 100 to reviews from mainstream critics, calculated an average score of 66, based on 24 reviews, which indicates "generally favorable reviews".

Roger Ebert of Chicago Sun-Times gave this film 3 out of 4 stars, saying that this film is "Effective without being overwhelming."

Claudia Puig of USA Today gave this film 3 and a half stars out of 4, calling it "a deeply moving and powerful film."

On the negative side, Steven Rea of The Philadelphia Inquirer gave this film a score of 2.5/4, saying that "it's a harrowing tale, but one that gets phonied up with unnecessary slo-mos, manipulative soundtrack cues, and unrestrained thespianism."

=== Awards and nominations ===
This film was Mexico's submission for Best Foreign Language Film at the 77th Academy Awards, but failed to be shortlisted by the Academy.

- Three Ariel Awards in 2005 for Best special effects, make-up and supporting actress
- A Crystal Heart Award as well as the Audience Choice Award for Dramatic Feature at the 2005 Heartland Film Festival.
- Golden Space Needle award at the Seattle International Film Festival (2005)
- Stanley Kramer Award of the Producers Guild of America
- Golden award at Giffoni Film Festival in the Free to Fly category in 2005.
- Tromsø International Film Festival's audience award in 2006
- Best Feature Film and Best Actor Award for Carlos Padilla Lenero - 2005 San Diego International Film Festival

== See also ==
- List of submissions to the 77th Academy Awards for Best Foreign Language Film
- List of Mexican submissions for the Academy Award for Best Foreign Language Film
