= Luis Mandoki =

Mexican film director

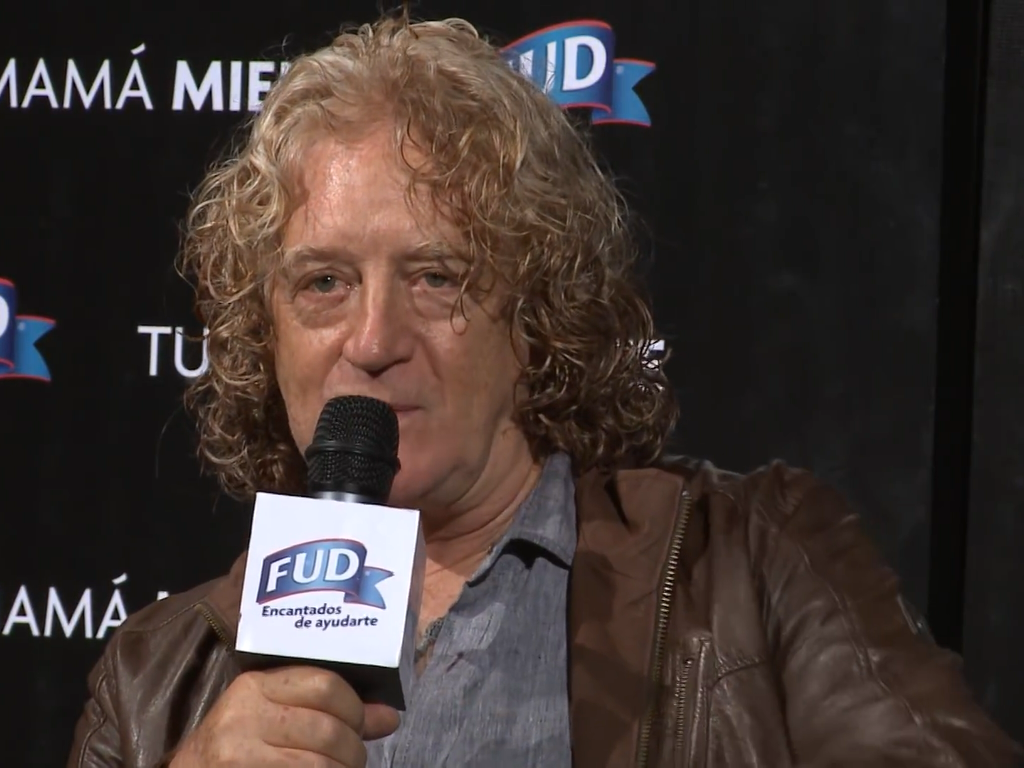
- Mandoki in 2016
- Born: August 17, 1954 (age 70); Mexico City, Mexico
- Occupation(s): Director, producer, screenwriter
- Years active: 1975–present

Luis Mandoki (born August 17, 1954) is a Mexican film director, working in Mexico and Hollywood.

== Early life and education ==
Luis Mandoki was born on August 17, 1954 in Mexico City. His parents are Hungarian Jews. He studied Fine Arts in Mexico, and at the San Francisco Art Institute, the London College of Printing and the London International Film School. While attending this last institution, he directed his first short film Silent Music which won an award at the International Amateur Film Festival of Cannes Film Festival in 1976.

== Career ==
Back in Mexico, he directed short films and documentaries for the Instituto Nacional Indigenista (the National Institute for the Indigenous), Conacine (National Commission of Film) and the Centro de Produccion de Cortometraje (Center for the Production of Short Films). He received an Ariel Award of the Mexican Academy of Film for his short film El secreto in 1980. His film Motel was selected to represent Mexico in film festivals around the globe in 1984.

At the age of 30, he developed, wrote, produced and directed Gaby: A True Story (1987), a movie about the struggles of disability activist Gaby Brimer. This film was nominated for both the Academy and Golden Globe Awards.

For the next 15 years, he filmed only in English until the critically acclaimed Voces inocentes of 2004. This film gave him a Best Director nomination for the Ariel Award in 2005. The film also received three awards and was nominated for Best Film. The film was selected to represent Mexico for the Academy Award for Best Foreign Language Film and had a box-office output of 49.4 million pesos (roughly 4.5 million U.S. dollars) and was seen by 1.5 million people.

Mandoki resides in Mexico City with his wife, Olivia, and three children Camille, Daniel and Michelle.

== Filmography ==
- Mundo mágico (1980)
- Campeche, un estado de ánimo (1980)
- El secreto (1980)
- Papaloapan (1982)
- Motel (1984)
- Gaby: A True Story (1987)
- The Edge (TV, 1989)
- White Palace (1990)
- Born Yesterday (1993)
- When a Man Loves a Woman (1994)
- Message in a Bottle (1999)
- Angel Eyes (2001)
- Trapped (2002)
- Voces inocentes (2004)
- ¿Quién es el señor López? (2006) (TV)
- Fraude: México 2006 (2007)
- La vida precoz y breve de Sabina Rivas (2012)
- Presencias (2021)
