= Rafael Montero (film director) =

Mexican film director (born 1953)

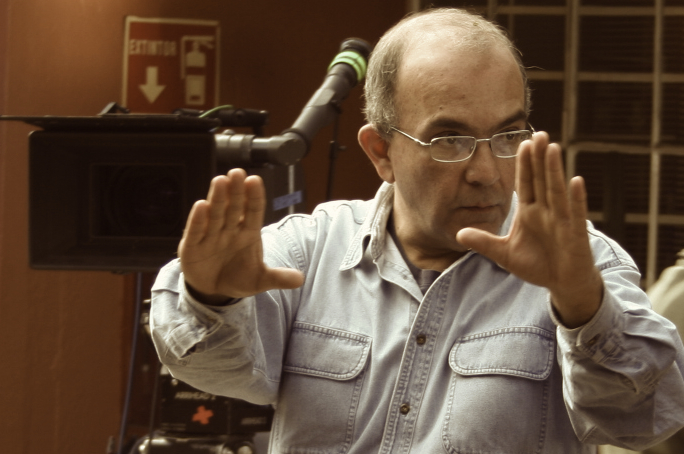
Rafael Montero

Rafael Montero (born 9 October 1953 in Mexico City) is a film director and script writer known as one of the leaders of New Mexican Cinema. He is known for the feature films Cilantro y Perejil, El Costo de la Vida (The Cost of Life) y Corazones Rotos (Broken Hearts).

He has written and directed television programs, short films, commercials, documentaries and feature films. He has also participated as a judge and speaker at various festivals, competitions, conferences and seminars.

== Early years ==
Rafael Montero was born and spent his infancy in Colonia San Rafael in Mexico City. He was the son of Alicia García Betancourt and railroad engineer Rafael Montero Márquez.

== Professional career ==
El Costo de la Vida marked his debut as a screenwriter and director in the film industry by earning good results at the box office and with critics; it was nominated in several categories for the Silver Goddess Award and Ariel Award.

In the Nineties he directed the cult series La Hora Marcada (The Marked Hour) with well-known filmmakers Alfonso Cuarón, Guillermo del Toro and Emmanuel Lubezki.

Between 1990 and 1995 he directed five feature films including Una Buena Forma de Morir (A Good Way to Die) and Ya la Hicimos (We Already Did It), one of the highest-grossing films of 1993.

== Cinematography ==
Year	Film	Credited as			
Year	Film	director	screenWriter	Producer	Film Editor
1978	Adiós David	Yes	Yes	Yes	Yes
1984	El Eterno Retorno: Testimonio de los Indios Kikapú	Yes	Yes	Yes	Yes
1988	Historias de Ciudad, episodio Viajeros	Yes	Yes		Yes
1988	El Costo de La Vida	Yes	Yes	Yes	Yes
1992	Justicia de Nadie	Yes	Yes		Yes
1992	El Jefe de Vigilancia	Yes	Yes		Yes
1993	Ya la Hicimos	Yes			Yes
1993	Hoy No Circula	Yes			Yes
1993	Una Buena Forma de Morir	Yes			Yes
1994	Crímen Perfecto	Yes			Yes
1995	Embrujo de Rock	Yes			Yes
1996	Cilantro y perejil	Yes			Yes
2001	Corazones rotos	Yes	Yes		Yes
2002	Dame tu cuerpo	Yes			Yes
2003	No tuvo tiempo: La Hurbanistoria de Rockdrigo	Yes	Yes		Yes
2004	Preguntas Sin Respuesta, Los Asesinatos y Desapariciones de Mujeres en Ciudad Juárez y Chihuahua	Yes	Yes	Yes	Yes
2008	Un tigre en la cama	Yes			
2010	La Cama	Yes	Yes		Yes
2011	Los Amorosos	Yes	Yes		Yes
2012	Fachon Models	Yes			
2015	Villa, itinerario de una pasión	Yes			
