= The Prize (2011 film) =

2011 film

- Film poster
- Directed by: Paula Markovitch
- Written by: Paula Markovitch
- Produced by: Juan Pablo Gugliotta; Alberto Muffelmann
- Starring: Paula Galinelli Hertzog; Laura Agorreca; Viviana Suraniti
- Cinematography: Wojciech Staroń
- Edited by: Dafne Macías; Paula Markovitch; Lorena Moriconi; Mariana Rodríguez
- Music by: Sergio Gurrola
- Distributed by: Umedia
- Release date: 11 February 2011 (Berlinale)
- Running time: 115 minutes
- Countries: Mexico; France; Poland; Germany
- Language: Spanish

The Prize (Spanish: El premio) is a 2011 drama film directed by Paula Markovitch. The film was screened In Competition at the 61st Berlin International Film Festival.

== Cast ==
- Paula Galinelli Hertzog as Cecilia 'Ceci' Edelstein
- Laura Agorreca as Lucía Edelstein
- Viviana Suraniti as Maestra Rosita
- Sharon Herrera as Silvia
- Diego Alfonso as Soldier
- Uriel Iasillo as Walter

== Awards ==
The film was in the competition for the Golden Bear at the 61st Berlin International Film Festival in 2011. It was awarded:

- Silver Bear for Outstanding Artistic Contribution (Production Design) - Barbara Enriquez
- Silver Bear for outstanding artistic contribution (Camera) - Wojciech Staroń
