= Felipe Cazals =

Mexican film director, screenwriter, and producer (1937–2021)

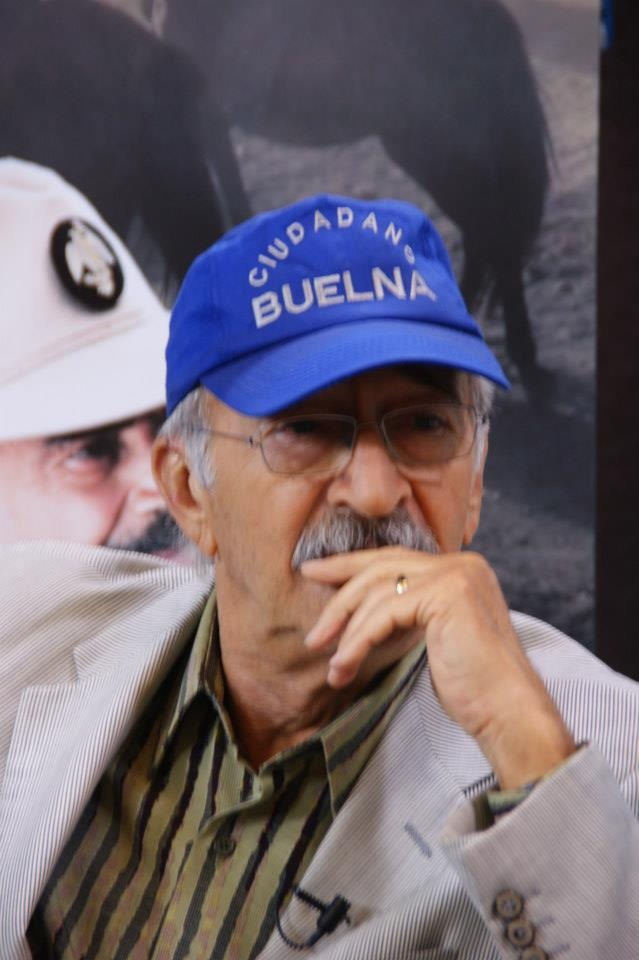
- Cazals in 2013
- Born: 28 July 1937
- Died: 16 October 2021 (age 84)
- Occupation: Film director
- Awards: Silver Bear Grand Jury Prize; Silver Shell for Best Director; National Prize for Arts

Felipe Francisco Enrique Cazals Siena (28 July 1937 – 16 October 2021) was a Mexican film director, screenwriter, and producer.

Together with Arturo Ripstein, Cazals was considered in Mexico as 'one of the most representative film directors of his generation'. With his films Las Inocentes (1986), Las Poquianchis (1976), El Apando (1976), and Canoa (1976), he was considered to be one of the most creative and bitter-critical filmmakers in the history of Latin American movies.

Canoa was entered into the 26th Berlin International Film Festival, where it won the Silver Bear - Special Jury Prize.

His 1973 film Aquellos años was entered into the 8th Moscow International Film Festival where it won a Special Prize.

In 2007 he was awarded the National Prize for Arts in the Fine arts category.

He died on 16 October 2021.

== Awards and recognition ==
- 1974: Bilbao International Festival of Documentary and Short Films, First prize
- 1976: Berlin International Film Festival, Silver Bear Grand Jury Prize
- 1986: San Sebastián International Film Festival, Silver Shell for Best Director
- 2005: Trieste Festival of Latin-American Cinema, Career achievement awards
- 2007: National Prize for Arts - Fine arts

== Filmography ==
- Ciudadano Buelna (2012)
- Chico Grande (2010)
- Las Vueltas del citrillo (2006)
- Digna... hasta el último aliento (2004)
- Su alteza serenísima (2000), His Most Serene Highness (International: English title)
- Kino (1993)
- Desvestidas y alborotadas (1991)
- Burbujas de amor (1991)
- La Furia de un dios (1987)
- Las Inocentes (1986)
- Testimonios de la revolución (1986) [TV Series]
- El Tres de copas (1986)
- La Dama solitaria (1985) [TV Series]
- Damian (1985) [TV Series]
- Dulce espiritu (1985) [TV Series]
- La Habitación que silva (1985) [TV Series]
- Pesadilla (1985) [TV Series]
- Los Motivos de Luz (1985)
- Centenario (1984)
- Bajo la metralla (1983)
- El Qué sabe, sabe (1983) [TV Series]
- Siete cucas, Las (1981)
- El Gran triunfo (1981)
- Rigo es amor (1980)
- El Año de la Peste (1979)
- La Guera Rodríguez (1978)
- Las Poquianchis (1976)
- The Heist (1976)
- Canoa (1976)
- Investigación cientifica (1975)
- Testimonios y documentos; Paro agrario (1975)
- Los que viven donde el viento sopla suave (1974)
- Aquellos años (1973)
- The Garden of Aunt Isabel (1971)
- Emiliano Zapata (1970)
- Familiaridades (1969), Familiarities (International: English title)
- La Manzana de la discordia (1968), The Apple of Discord (International: English title)
- Alfonso Reyes (1965)
- Leonora Carrington o el sortilegio ironico (1965)
- Mariana Alcoforado (1965)
- La Otra guerra (1965)
- Que se callen... (1965)
