= List of Mexican films of the 1990s =

A list of films produced in the Cinema of Mexico in the 1990s, ordered by year of release. For an alphabetical list of articles on Mexican films see Category:Mexican films.

== 1990s ==
Title	Director	Cast	Genre	Notes
1990
La tarea	Jaime Humberto Hermosillo	María Rojo, José Alonso		Special Mention at the 17th Moscow International Film Festival and Silver Charybdis at the Taormina Film Fest
Total Recall	Paul Verhoeven	Arnold Schwarzenegger, Rachel Ticotin, Sharon Stone, Michael Ironside, Ronny Cox	Science fiction action	Filmed entirely in Mexico
Lencha la taxista		Lucila Mariscal, Cesár Bono, Carlos Yustis		
Por tu maldito amor	Rafael Villaseñor Kuri	Vicente Fernández, Sonia Infante, Claudia Fernández		
Sor Batalla	Jesús Fragoso Montoya	María Antonieta de las Nieves "La Chilindrina", Lucha Villa, David Reynoso, Germán Robles		
Deliciosa sinvergüenza	René Cardona Jr.	Lucero		
La sombra del ciprés es alargada	Luis Alcoriza	Emilio Gutiérrez Caba, Fiorella Faltoyano		Co-production with Spain
Return to Aztlán	Juan Mora Catlett			
Un corazón para dos	Sergio Véjar	Pedro Fernández, Daniela Leites		
1991
Cabeza de Vaca	Nicolás Echevarría			Entered into the 41st Berlin International Film Festival
Woman of the Port	Arturo Ripstein	Damián Alcázar, Patricia Reyes Spíndola		Screened at the 1991 Cannes Film Festival
Mi querido viejo	Rafael Villaseñor Kuri	Vicente Fernández, Alejandro Fernández, Julieta Rosen, Manuel Ojeda		Last movie of Vicente Fernández
Danzón	Maria Novaro	María Rojo, Tito Vasconcelos		
Solo con tu pareja	Alfonso Cuarón	Daniel Giménez Cacho, Claudia Ramírez		
El secuestro de un policía	Alfredo B. Crevenna	Jorge Abraham, Adalberto Arvizu		
Highway Patrolman	Alex Cox	Roberto Sosa, Bruno Bichir, Zaide Silvia Gutiérrez, Vanessa Bauche		
Lola the Truck Driver 3	Raúl Fernández	Rosa Gloria Chagoyán, Rolando Fernández, Frank Moro	Action	
1992
Como agua para chocolate	Alfonso Arau	Lumi Cavazos, Marco Leonardi, Regina Torné		
El Bulto	Gabriel Retes	José Alonso, Hector Bonilla		
Los años de Greta	Alberto Bojórquez	Beatriz Aguirre, Meche Barba, Esther Fernández		
El Mariachi	Robert Rodriguez	Carlos Gallardo, Consuelo Gómez		
Cronos	Guillermo del Toro	Federico Luppi, Ron Perlman, Claudio Brook, Margarita Isabel	Horror	Entered into the 18th Moscow International Film Festival
Gertrudis	Ernesto Medina	Ofelia Medina, Angélica Aragón, Fernando Balzaretti		
1993
¡Aquí espantan!	Joaquín Bisner	Rafael Inclán, Patricia Reyes Spíndola		
Miroslava	Alejandro Pelayo	Arielle Dombasle, Demián Bichir		
A Wall of Silence	Lita Stantic	Vanessa Redgrave, Ofelia Medina, Lautaro Murúa, Lorenzo Quinteros, Soledad Villamil		Co-production with Argentina and the United Kingdom
Amargo destino	Roberto Guinar	Roberto Guinar, Lorena Herrera		
Amor a la medida	Raúl Araiza	Los Tigres del Norte		
Banderas, the Tyrant	José Luis García Sánchez	Gian Maria Volonté, Ana Belén, Juan Diego, Fernando Guillén, Ignacio López Tarso		
Frontera Sur	Ernesto García Cabral, Hugo Stiglitz	Hugo Stiglitz, David Carradine, Isaac Hayes, Pedro Armendáriz Jr.		
The Beginning and the End	Arturo Ripstein	Ernesto Laguardia, Julieta Egurrola, Blanca Guerra, Verónica Merchant		Selected as the Mexican entry for the Best Foreign Language Film at the 67th Academy Awards
The Harvest	David Marconi	Miguel Ferrer, Leilani Sarelle, Tony Denison, Henry Silva		Co-production with the United States
Zapatos viejos	Sergio Andrade			
1994
The Queen of the Night	Arturo Ripstein	Patricia Reyes Spíndola, Alberto Estrella		Entered into the 1994 Cannes Film Festival
El héroe	Carlos Carrera		Animation	Won the Short Film Palme d'Or at the 1994 Cannes Film Festival
La pura		Maribel Guardia		
The Devil Never Sleeps	Lourdes Portillo		Documentary	Co-production with the United States
1995
El callejón de los milagros	Jorge Fons	Salma Hayek, Daniel Giménez Cacho, Bruno Bichir		
Cilantro y perejil	Rafael Montero	Arcelia Ramírez, Demián Bichir, German Dehesa		
A Walk in the Clouds	Alfonso Arau	Keanu Reeves, Aitana Sánchez-Gijón, Anthony Quinn		
Bésame En La Boca	Abraham Cherem	Paulina Rubio, Charlie Masso, Fernando Colunga, Delia Casanova, Dolores Beristáin		
Bésame mucho	Philippe Toledano	Amparo Grisales, Ruddy Rodríguez, Gustavo Rodríguez		Co-production with Colombia and Venezuela
Jonah and the Pink Whale	Juan Carlos Valdivia	Dino García, María Renée Prudencio		Co-production with Bolivia
Perdóname todo	Raúl Araiza	José José, Alejandra Ávalos, Sergio Jiménez		
Sin remitente	Carlos Carrera	Fernando Torre Lapham, Tiaré Scanda, Luisa Huertas		Entered into the main competition at the 52nd Venice International Film Festival
1996
Deep Crimson	Arturo Ripstein	Regina Orozco, Daniel Giménez Cacho	Crime drama	
Entre Pancho Villa y una mujer desnuda	Sabina Berman	Jesus Ochoa, Diana Bracho		
From Dusk till Dawn	Robert Rodriguez	Harvey Keitel, George Clooney, Quentin Tarantino, Juliette Lewis	Action horror	
Salón México	Jose Luis Gómez Agras	María Rojo, Demián Bichir		
All of Them Witches	Daniel Gruener	Susana Zabaleta, Ricardo Blume, Alejandro Tommasi, Delia Casanova		
The Arrival	David Twohy	Charlie Sheen, Lindsay Crouse, Ron Silver, Teri Polo, Richard Schiff		Co-production with the United States
Katuwira, donde nacen y mueren los sueños	Íñigo Vallejo-Nágera	Bruno Bichir		
Libre de culpas	Marcel Sisniega			
1997
El agujero	Beto Gómez			
De noche vienes, Esmeralda	Jaime Humberto Hermosillo	María Rojo		
Elisa Before the End of the World	Juan Antonio de la Riva	Sherlyn González, Imanol Landeta, Susana Zabaleta	Drama	
Perdita Durango	Alex de la Iglesia	Rosie Perez, Javier Bardem		
Por si no te vuelvo a ver	Juan Pablo Villaseñor			
La primera noche	Alejandro Gamboa	Mariana Ávila, Francesca Guillén		
Sístole diástole	Carlos Cuarón	Salma Hayek, Lumi Cavazos	Short	
Titanic	James Cameron	Leonardo DiCaprio, Kate Winslet, Billy Zane, Kathy Bates, Frances Fisher, Bernard Hill, Jonathan Hyde, Danny Nucci, David Warner, Bill Paxton	Romantic disaster	
Who the Hell Is Juliette?	Carlos Marcovich	Yuliet Ortega, Fabiola Quiroz		
Perfect Target	Sheldon Lettich	Daniel Bernhardt		Co-production with the United States
Santo Luzbel	Miguel Sabido	Rafael Cortes, Victor Perez		
Un baúl lleno de miedo	Joaquín Bissner	Diana Bracho, Julián Pastor		
1998
Bajo California: El límite del tiempo	Carlos Bolado			
El cometa	José Buil, Marisa Sistach			
Un embrujo	Carlos Carrera			
En el paraíso no existe el dolor	Víctor Saca			
En un claroscuro de la luna	Sergio Olhovich	Tiaré Scanda		
Enredando sombras	Multiple directors			
El evangelio de las maravillas	Arturo Ripstein	Francisco Rabal, Katy Jurado		Screened at the 1998 Cannes Film Festival
Fibra óptica	Francisco Athié			
Un hilito de sangre	Erwin Neumaier			
La paloma de Marsella	Carlos García Agraz			
Santitos	Alejandro Springall			
Violeta	Alberto Cortés			
1999
Sexo, pudor y lágrimas	Antonio Serrano	Demián Bichir, Susana Zabaleta, Cecilia Suárez		
Ave María	Eduardo Rossoff			
El coronel no tiene quien le escriba	Arturo Ripstein	Salma Hayek, Fernando Luján, Daniel Giménez Cacho		Entered into the 1999 Cannes Film Festival
Entre la tarde y la noche	Óscar Blancarte			
La ley de Herodes	Luis Estrada	Damián Alcázar, Pedro Armendáriz Jr.		
La segunda noche	Alejandro Gamboa			
A Sweet Scent of Death	Gabriel Retes			Entered into the 21st Moscow International Film Festival
La otra conquista	Salvador Carrasco	Demián Delgado, Elpidia Carrillo		
Deep Blue Sea	Renny Harlin	Thomas Jane, Saffron Burrows, Samuel L. Jackson, Michael Rapaport, LL Cool J		Co-production with the United States
Freeway II: Confessions of a Trickbaby	Matthew Bright	Natasha Lyonne		Co-production with the United States
Las delicias del poder	Iván Lipkies	María Elena Velasco, Ernesto Gómez Cruz, Irma Dorantes, Adalberto Martínez		
Ravenous	Antonia Bird	Guy Pearce, Robert Carlyle, Jeffrey Jones, David Arquette		Co-production with the United Kingdom and the United States
Stigmata	Rupert Wainwright	Patricia Arquette, Gabriel Byrne, Jonathan Pryce, Nia Long, Rade Šerbedžija		Co-production with the United States
