= 38th Ariel Awards =

1996 Mexican film awards

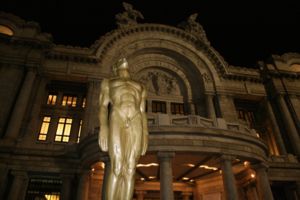
- Ariel Award, Mexico
- Date: July 22, 1996

Highlights
- Best Picture: Sin Remitente
- Most awards: La Reina de la Noche (6)
- Most nominations: Mujeres Insumisas (16)

The 38th Ariel Awards ceremony, organized by the Mexican Academy of Film Arts and Sciences (AMACC) took place on July 22, 1996, in Mexico City. During the ceremony, AMACC presented the Ariel Award in 25 categories honoring films released in 1995. Sin Remitente received four awards out of 14 nominations, including Best Picture and Best Director for Carlos Carrera. La Reina de la Noche was the most awarded film with six awards; La Línea Paterna and Sobrenatural with three; Dulces Compañías, El Anzuelo and Mujeres Insumisas with two; and Entre Pancho Villa y Una Mujer Desnuda, Domingo Siete, De Tripas, Corazón, and El Abuelo Cheno y Otras Historias with one.

== Winners and nominees ==
Winners are listed first and highlighted with boldface.

**Best Picture**: **Sin Remitente**; Dulces Compañías; Entre Pancho Villa y Una Mujer Desnuda; La Reina de la Noche; Mujeres Insumisas	**Best Director**: **Carlos Carrera** – **Sin Remitente**; Oscar Blancarte – Dulces Compañías; José Luis García Agraz – Salón México; Daniel Gruener – Sobrenatural; Alberto Isaac – Mujeres Insumisas
**Best Actor**: **Fernando Torre Lapham** – **Sin Remitente**; José Alonso – Mujeres Insumisas; Bruno Bichir – El Anzuelo; Roberto Cobo – Dulces Compañías; Ramiro Huerta – Dulces Compañías	**Best Actress**: **Patricia Reyes Spíndola** – **La Reina de la Noche**; Angélica Aragón – Sucesos Distantes; Diana Bracho – Entre Pancho Villa y Una Mujer Desnuda; Ana Ofelia Murguía – El Anzuelo; Patricia Reyes Spíndola – Mujeres Insumisas
**Best Supporting Actor**: **Damián Alcázar** – **El Anzuelo**; **Jesús Ochoa** – **Entre Pancho Villa y Una Mujer Desnuda**; Héctor Bonilla – Doble Indemnización; Guillermo Gil – Sin Remitente; Manuel Ojeda – Salón México	**Best Supporting Actress**: **Ana Ofelia Murguía** – **La Reina de la Noche**; Delia Casanova – Sobrenatural; Lourdes Elizarrarás – Mujeres Insumisas; Blanca Guerra – Salón México; Gina Morett – Sin Remitente; Regina Orozco – Mujeres Insumisas; Leticia Perdigón – Doble Indemnización
**Best Actor in a Minor Role**: **Luis Felipe Tovar** – **Sin Remitente**; Arturo Alegro – La Reina de la Noche; Juan Claudio Retes – Mujeres Insumisas; Mario Iván Martínez – Sucesos Distantes	**Best Actress in a Minor Role**: **Margarita Isabel** – **Mujeres Insumisas**; Zaide Silvia Gutiérrez – Entre Pancho Villa y Una Mujer Desnuda; Ana Ofelia Murguía – Morena; Lolo Navarro – El Anzuelo; Gina Morett – Salón México
**Best Original Story**: **La Línea Paterna** – **José Buil**; El Anzuelo – Ernesto Rimoch; La Reina de la Noche – Paz Alicia Garciadiego; Mujeres Insumisas – Alberto Isaac	**Best Screenplay**: **La Línea Paterna** – **José Buil** **based on his original story**; Dulces Compañías – Oscar Blancarte based on the plays Un Misterioso Pacto and Bajo el Silencio by Óscar Liera; Mujeres Insumisas – Alberto Isaac from his original story; La Reina de la Noche – Paz Alicia Garciadiego based on her original story; Sin Remitente – Ignacio Ortíz Cruz and Silvia Pasternac based on the play La Carta de Amor by Paula Markovitch
**Best First Feature Film**: **El Anzuelo** – **Ernesto Rimoch**; Entre Pancho Villa y Una Mujer Desnuda – Isabelle Tardan and Sabina Berman; Sobrenatural – Daniel Gruener	**Best Documentary Feature**: **La Línea Paterna** – **José Buil and Maryse Sistach**; El Pueblo Mexicano Que Camina – Juan Francisco Urrusti; Un Beso a Esta Tierra – Daniel Goldberg
**Best Best Medium-Length Fiction Film**: **Domingo Siete** – **Flavio González**	**Best Live Action Short Film**: **De Tripas, Corazón** – **Antonio Urrutia**; Félix, Como el Gato – Gilberto Gazcón; Un Pedazo de Noche – Roberto Rochín
**Best Documentary Short Subject**: **El Abuelo Cheno y Otras Historias** – Juan Carlos Rulfo; No Todo es Permanente – Fernando Eimbcke; Planeta Siqueiros – José Ramón Mikelajáuregui	**Best Original Score**: **Dulces Compañías – Oscar Reynoso**; La Reina de la Noche – Lucía Álvarez; Sucesos Distantes – Eduardo Gamboa; Sin Remitente – Juan Cristobal Pérez Grobet
**Best Original Music Theme or Song**: **Dulces Compañías – María Eugenia Castillejos**; **La Reina de la Noche – Lucía Álvarez and Paz Alicia Garciadiego**; El Anzuelo – Juan Cristobal Pérez Grobet and Luis Ernesto Martínez; Sobrenatural – Gabriel González	**Best Cinematography**: **Sobrenatural – Rodrigo Prieto**; Mujeres Insumisas – Toni Kuhn; Salón México – Carlos Marcovich; Sin Remitente – Xavier Pérez Grobet; Sucesos Distantes – Carlos Marcovich
**Best Film Editing**: **Mujeres Insumisas – Carlos Savage**; El Anzuelo – Sigfrido Barjau; La Línea Paterna – José Buil; La Reina de la Noche – Rafael Castanedo; Sin Remitente – Sigfrido Barjau	**Best Production Design**: **La Reina de la Noche** – **José Luis Aguilar**; Mujeres Insumisas – Teresa Pecanins; Salón México – Carmen Giménez Cacho; Sin Remitente – Gloria Carrasco
**Best Set Design**: **La Reina de la Noche** – **Ángeles Martínez and Eduardo Corona**; Mujeres Insumisas – Teresa Pecanins; Salón México – Carmen Giménez Cacho and Patricia Nava; Sin Remitente – Gloria Carrasco	**Best Costume Design**: **La Reina de la Noche** – **Graciela Mazón**; Mujeres Insumisas – Abel Melo; Salón México – Ana Magis; Sobrenatural – Mariestela Fernández
**Best Makeup**: (No winner announced); Mujeres Insumisas – Teresa Patterson; Salón México – Sergio Espinoza; Sobrenatural – Alfredo Tigre Mora and Eduardo Gómez	**Best Sound**: **Sobrenatural – Gabriel Romo, Miguel Sandoval and Rogelio Villanueva**; Dulces Compañías – Miguel Sandoval; Salón México – Nerio Barberis and Samuel Larson; Sin Remitente – Nerio Barberis and Salvador de la Fuente; Sucesos Distantes – Salvador de la Fuente
**Best Special Effects**: **Sobrenatural – Alejandro Vázquez**; Entre Pancho Villa y Una Mujer Desnuda – Jorge Jara; Sin Remitente – Alejandro Vázquez

== Special awards ==
- Golden Ariel – Raúl Lavista
- Special Silver Ariel – Jorge Stahl Jr. and Luis Aguilar
- Salvador Toscano Medal – Emilio García Riera
- Special recognition – Columba Domínguez
- Honorary diploma – Cineteca Nacional, Sindicato de Trabajadores de la Industria Cinematográfica (Sección 49), and Sindicato de Trabajadores de la Producción Cinematográfica (Sección de Técnicos y Manuales)

== Multiple nominations and awards ==
The following ten films received multiple nominations:

Nominations	Film
16	Mujeres Insumisas
14	Sin Remitente
12	La Reina de la Noche
10	Salón México
8	Dulces Compañías
8	El Anzuelo
8	Sobrenatural
6	Entre Pancho Villa y Una Mujer Desnuda
5	Sucesos Distantes
4	La Línea Paterna

Films that received multiple awards:

Awards	Film
6	La Reina de la Noche
4	Sin Remitente
3	La Línea Paterna
3	Sobrenatural
2	Dulces Compañías
2	El Anzuelo
2	Mujeres Insumisas
