= Marta Aura =

Mexican actress (1942–2022)

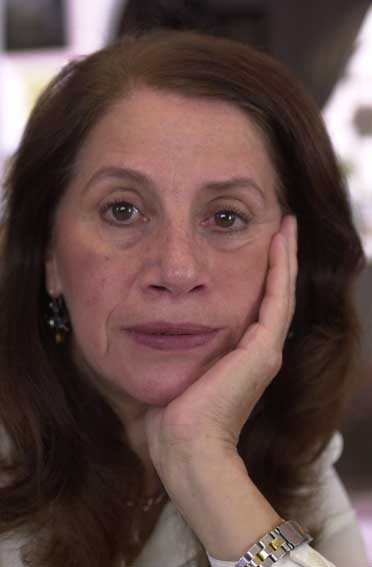
- Born: 4 September 1942; Mexico City, Mexico
- Died: 8 July 2022 (aged 79); Mexico City, Mexico
- Occupation: Actress

Marta Aura (4 September 1942 – 8 July 2022) was a Mexican actress.

== Life and career ==
Aura was born in Mexico City on 4 September 1942, the daughter of Olimpo Aura Pineda and Ema Palacios Ordorica. Her parents did not accept the fact that she wanted to become an actress and therefore she decided to leave her house together with her sister María Elena Aura, a writer, and her brother Alejandro Aura, an actor and poet. Her niece María Aura, Alejandro's daughter, is also an actress.

Aura studied acting at the National Academy of Fine Arts. She made her stage debut in 1959, although she became known professionally in 1965. Shortly thereafter she met her first husband, actor Adán Guevara, with whom she had two children. After fifteen years, they divorced. After that, she met the Mexican actor of Spanish origin Rubén Rojo, who subsequently married her and with whom she had a son, actor Rubén Rojo Aura. In total she had three children and four grandchildren.

Aura died in Mexico City on 8 July 2022, at the age of 79.

== Filmography ==
=== Television ===
- Cuentos para solitarios (1999).... Silvia
- Mujer, casos de la vida real (1990 - 1997)
- Televiteatros (1993)
- Hora marcada (episode "De ángeles y demonios") (1990).... Mujer de blanco
- El periquillo sarniento (1981)

=== Film ===
- Coraje (2022)....Alma
- Cuatro Lunas (2017).... Petra
- Las razones del corazón (2011).... Madre de Emilia
- Las paredes hablan (2010).... Casa Espíritu (voice)
- El baile de San Juan (2010).... Genoveva
- Fragmentos sobre el vértigo (2010).... Madre de Alejandra
- Vaho (2009).... Josefina
- El libro de piedra (2009).... Soledad
- Música de ambulancia (2009)
- Arráncame la vida (2008).... Josefina
- El garabato (2008)
- Mosquita muerta (2008).... Mamá de Sofía
- El milagrito de San Jacinto (2007)
- ...Y sólo humo (2007).... Ana
- Cementerio de papel (2007)
- Si muero lejos de ti (2006)
- El carnaval de Sodoma (2006).... Caricoña
- Una causa noble (2006).... Mamá Lola
- Cicatrices (2005)
- El día menos pensado (2005)
- Peatonal (2004)
- Adán y Eva (Todavía) (2004)
- La luna de Antonio (2003)
- Como Dios manda (2003).... Madre Superiora
- Zurdo (2003)
- Malos presagios (2002)
- Sin sentido (2002)
- Escrito en el cuerpo de la noche (2001).... Gaviota
- Y tu mamá también (2001).... Enriqueta "Queta" Allende
- ¿Y cómo es él? (2001).... Mamá de Sofía
- Así es la vida (2000)
- Azar (2000)
- El evangelio de las maravillas (1998)
- La primera noche (2008).... Mamá del Gordo
- Tres minutos en la oscuridad (1996)
- En el aire (1995).... Madre de Laura
- Nadie hablará de nosotras cuando hayamos muerto (1995).... María Luisa
- Amorosos fantasmas (1994)
- La reina de la noche (1994).... Balmori
- Nicolás (1994)
- Pueblo viejo (1993)
- Ángel de fuego (1992).... Marta
- La insaciable (1992)
- Golpe de suerte (1992)
- Rojo amanecer (1991).... Vecina
- Recuerdo de domingo (1990)
- La secta del sargón (1990)
- La envidia (1988)
- Las inocentes (1986)
- Los Motivos de Luz (1985).... Lic. Marisela Alférez
- Max Dominio (1981)
- ¡Que viva Tepito! (1981)
- El lugar sin límites (1978).... Emma
- Los Cachorros (1973)
- Landrú (1973)
- Cayó de la gloria el diablo (1972)
- El águila descalza (1971).... Trabajadora en la factoría
- Alguien nos quiere matar (1970)
- La excursión (1967)

=== Telenovelas ===
- Hombre tenías que ser (2013)
- La mujer de Judas (2012) .... Catalina Rojas de Castellanos
- Entre el amor y el deseo (2010-2011).... Elvira Martínez
- La loba (2010).... Teresa
- Secretos del alma (2008-2009).... Regina Cervantes
- Marina (2006).... Guadalupe "Lupe" Tovar
- Los Plateados (2005).... Augusta
- El alma herida (2003-2004).... Doña Guadalupe
- La duda (2002-2003).... Azucena
- Golpe bajo (2000-2001).... Lupita Carranza
- Una luz en el camino (1999).... Chole
- El privilegio de amar (1998 - 1999).... Josefina "Chepa" Pérez
- Chiquititas (1998).... Ernestina
- Pueblo chico, infierno grande (1997).... Mercedes
- Gente bien (1997).... Márgara
- La sombra del otro (1996).... Julieta Tavernier
- Canción de amor (1996)
- Buscando el paraíso (1993)
- Baila conmigo (1992)
- En carne propia (1990 - 1991).... Ángela
- Cenizas y diamantes (1990).... Amparo del Bosque
- Teresa (1989).... Balbina
- Dulce desafío (1988) .... Maritza Miranda
- Amor en silencio (1988).... Celia
- Quinceañera (1987).... Gertrudis
- Te amo (1984).... Mercedes
- La madre (1980)
- Julia (1979)
- La hora del silencio (1978) .... Matilde
- Acompáñame (1978).... Angustias

=== Theatre ===
- Mujer on the border
- Algunos cantos del infierno
- Medea
- Los signos del zodíaco
- Rita, Julia
- La mujer rota
- El padre
- El eclipse
- El pelícano
- El examen de maridos
- Antígona
- Los motivos del lobo
- La fiaca
- La morsa
- Voces en el templo
- El divino narciso
- Éramos tres hermanas
- Conmemorantes
