= Rodrigo Prieto =

Mexican cinematographer (born 1965)

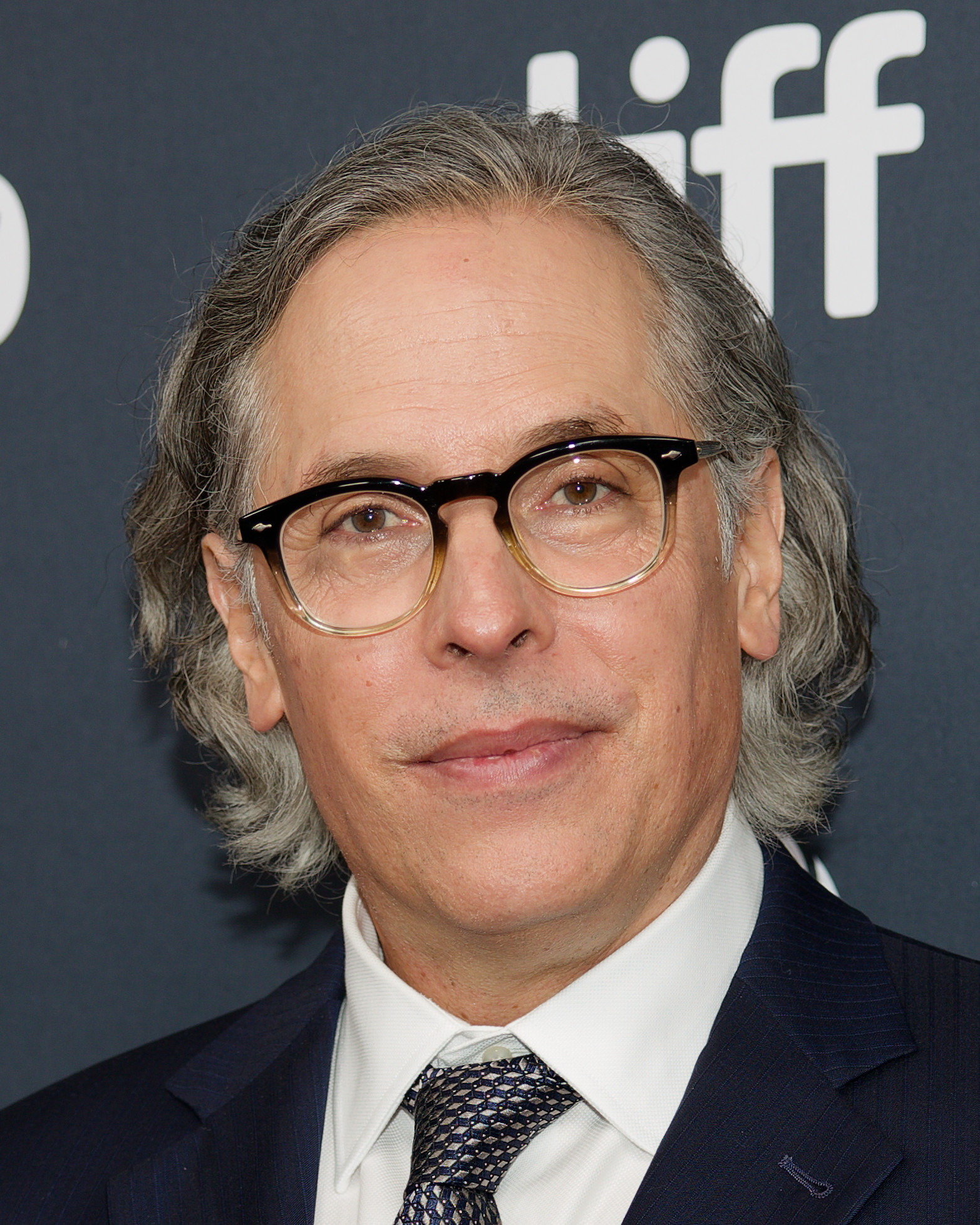
- Prieto at TIFF in 2024
- Born: Rodrigo Prieto Stambaugh; 23 November 1965 (age 60); Mexico City, Mexico
- Education: Centro de Capacitación Cinematográfica
- Occupation: Cinematographer
- Years active: 1988–present
- Organization(s): Mexican Society of Cinematographers; American Society of Cinematographers
- Spouse: Mónica
- Children: 2

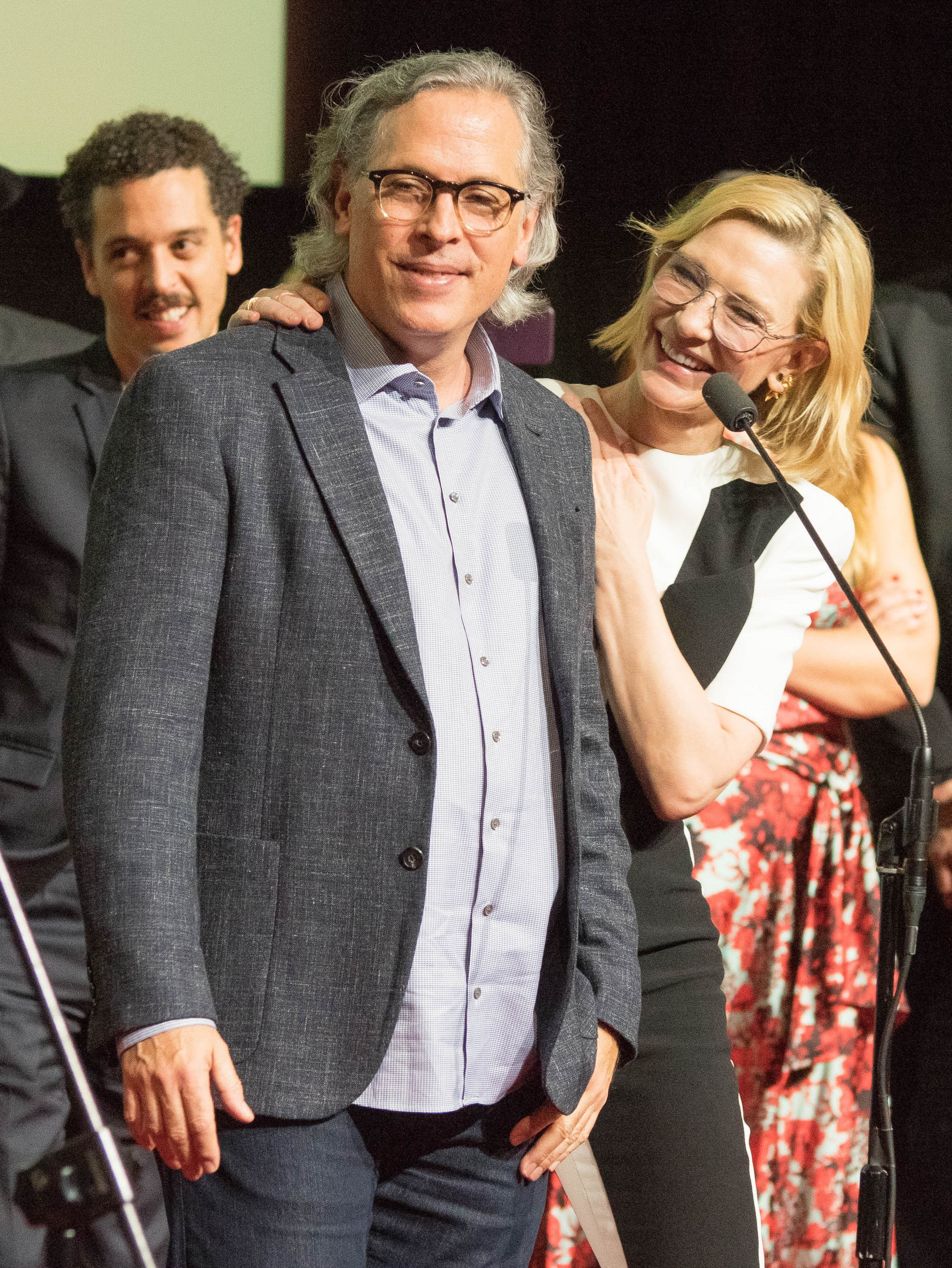
Rodrigo Prieto & Cate Blanchett Energa Camerimage 2024

Rodrigo Prieto Stambaugh ASC, AMC (born 23 November 1965) is a Mexican cinematographer and film director.

He has collaborated with Martin Scorsese and Alejandro González Iñárritu, among other prominent directors. He is a member of both the Mexican Society of Cinematographers and the American Society of Cinematographers. Throughout his career, Prieto has received many awards and nominations, including four Academy Award nominations for Best Cinematography in Ang Lee's Brokeback Mountain (2005) and Martin Scorsese's Silence (2016), The Irishman (2019), and Killers of the Flower Moon (2023).

== Early life and education ==
Rodrigo Prieto was born in Mexico City, Mexico. His grandfather, Jorge Prieto Laurens, was the mayor of Mexico City and leader of the Chamber of Deputies of Mexico, but was later persecuted by the country's ruler because of political differences. Prieto's grandfather escaped with his family to Texas and then to Los Angeles, where Prieto's father would spend most of his childhood. Prieto's father studied aeronautical engineering at New York University, where he met and married Prieto's mother, an artist. Rodrigo Prieto graduated from Centro de Capacitación Cinematográfica in Mexico City.

== Career ==
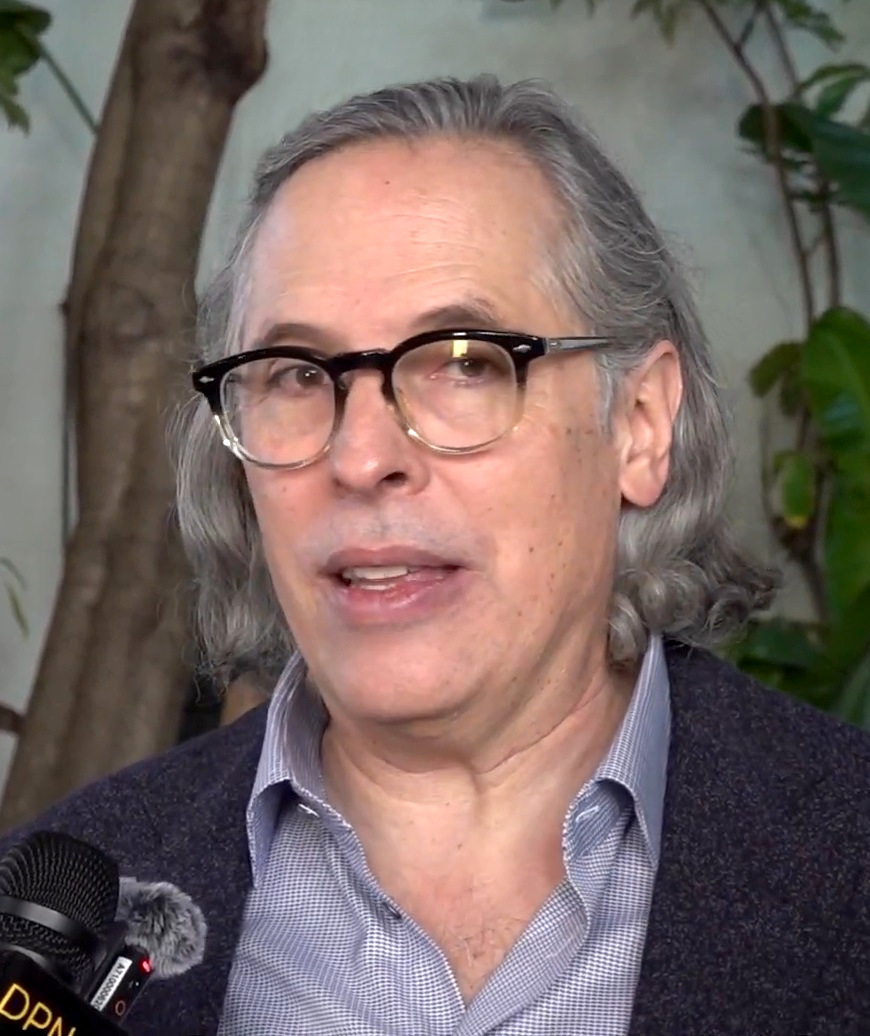
Prieto at SBIFF in 2024

Prieto is noted for his unconventional use of the camera often combined with strong moody lighting. In 25th Hour, Prieto utilized overexposure and other techniques to create original dream-like images to signify that the events shown on screen are memories or visions. Similarly innovative photography could be spotted in Frida, featuring strong colors and sharp imagery blended with atmospheric yellows and browns, as well as his experimental use of infrared during a battle scene in Alexander. Prieto also is interested in evoking naturalism, most evident in The Homesman and Brokeback Mountain. Prieto not only shot Brokeback Mountain, for which he was nominated for an Academy Award for Best Cinematography, but appeared in a cameo role within the film as a Mexican gigolo whom Jake Gyllenhaal's character, Jack Twist, meets.

Prieto has formed an artistic collaboration with Martin Scorsese on his films The Wolf of Wall Street, Silence, The Irishman, and Killers of the Flower Moon. He garnered nominations for Academy Award for Best Cinematography for the latter three. He served as cinematographer for the music videos for the three Taylor Swift 2020 singles, "The Man", which references one of his previous films The Wolf of Wall Street, "Cardigan" and "Willow". He went on to work with Swift on her videos for “The Fate of Ophelia” and “Opalite” in 2025 and 2026 respectively.

Prieto is the recipient of the 2021 Vilcek Prize in Filmmaking, awarded by the Vilcek Foundation.

In October 2023, Prieto served as a juror at the Morelia International Film Festival in Michoacán, Mexico.

== Personal life ==
Prieto resides in Los Angeles, California with his wife Monica and they have two daughters.

== Filmography ==
=== Feature film ===
Year	Title	Director	Notes
1996	All of Them Witches	Daniel Gruener	
1996	Oedipus Mayor	Jorge Alí Triana	
1998	Fibra Óptica	Francisco Athié	
1998	Un embrujo	Carlos Carrera	
2000	Amores perros	Alejandro González Iñárritu	
2000	Ricky 6	Peter Filardi	
2001	Original Sin	Michael Cristofer	
2002	Ten Tiny Love Stories	Rodrigo García	
2002	Frida	Julie Taymor	
2002	8 Mile	Curtis Hanson	
2002	25th Hour	Spike Lee	
2003	21 Grams	Alejandro González Iñárritu	
2004	Alexander	Oliver Stone	
2005	Brokeback Mountain	Ang Lee	
2006	Babel	Alejandro González Iñárritu	
2007	Lust, Caution	Ang Lee	
2009	Broken Embraces	Pedro Almodóvar	
2009	State of Play	Kevin Macdonald	
2010	Wall Street: Money Never Sleeps	Oliver Stone	
2010	Biutiful	Alejandro González Iñárritu	
2011	Water for Elephants	Francis Lawrence	
2011	We Bought a Zoo	Cameron Crowe	
2012	Argo	Ben Affleck	
2013	A Study in Gravity	Michael Haussman	
2013	The Wolf of Wall Street	Martin Scorsese	
2014	The Homesman	Tommy Lee Jones	
2016	Silence	Martin Scorsese	
2016	Passengers	Morten Tyldum	
2019	The Irishman	Martin Scorsese	
2020	The Glorias	Julie Taymor	
2023	Killers of the Flower Moon	Martin Scorsese	
2023	Barbie	Greta Gerwig	
2024	Pedro Páramo	Himself	With Nico Aguilar
TBA	What Happens at Night	Martin Scorsese	Post-production

=== Television ===
Documentary series

Year	Title	Director	Notes
2003–2004	America Undercover	Oliver Stone	Segments Persona Non Grata (Note: Shared credit with Serguei Saldívar Tanaka) and Looking for Fidel (Note: Shared credit with Carlos Marcovich)
2017	The Putin Interviews	Oliver Stone	Miniseries (Note: Shared credit with Anthony Dod Mantle)

TV series

Year	Title	Director	Notes
2015	What Lives Inside	Robert Stromberg	1 episode
2016	Vinyl	Martin Scorsese	Episode "Pilot"

=== Music video ===
Year	Title	Artist	Director
2012	"Blue Jeans"	Lana Del Rey	Yoann Lemoine
2020	"The Man"	Taylor Swift	
2020	"Cardigan"	Taylor Swift	
2020	"Willow"	Taylor Swift	
2024	"Fortnight" (featuring Post Malone)	Taylor Swift	
2025	"The Fate of Ophelia"	Taylor Swift	
2026	"Opalite"	Taylor Swift	

== Awards and nominations ==
Academy Awards

Year	Title	Category	Result
2006	Brokeback Mountain	Best Cinematography	Nominated
2017	Silence	Best Cinematography	Nominated
2020	The Irishman	Best Cinematography	Nominated
2024	Killers of the Flower Moon	Best Cinematography	Nominated

BAFTA Awards

Year	Title	Category	Result
2006	Brokeback Mountain	Best Cinematography	Nominated
2007	Babel	Best Cinematography	Nominated
2020	The Irishman	Best Cinematography	Nominated
2024	Killers of the Flower Moon	Best Cinematography	Nominated

American Society of Cinematographers Awards

Year	Title	Category	Result
2003	Frida	Outstanding Achievement in Cinematography in Theatrical Releases	Nominated
2006	Brokeback Mountain	Outstanding Achievement in Cinematography in Theatrical Releases	Nominated
2017	Silence	Outstanding Achievement in Cinematography in Theatrical Releases	Nominated
2020	The Irishman	Outstanding Achievement in Cinematography in Theatrical Releases	Nominated
2024	Killers of the Flower Moon	Outstanding Achievement in Cinematography in Theatrical Releases	Nominated
2025	"Fortnight"	Outstanding Achievement in Cinematography in Music Video	Nominated
2026	"The Fate of Ophelia"	Outstanding Achievement in Cinematography in Music Video	Won

Camerimage

Year	Title	Category	Result
2000	Amores Perros	Golden Frog	Won
2004	Alexander	Golden Frog	Nominated
2004	Alexander	Silver Frog	Won
2006	Babel	Main Competition Golden Frog	Nominated
2007	Lust, Caution	Main Competition Golden Frog	Nominated
2012	Argo	Main Competition Golden Frog	Nominated
2012	"Blue Jeans"	Best Cinematography in a Music Video	Nominated
2016	Vinyl	Jury Award Best Pilot	Nominated
2020	The Irishman	Main Competition Golden Frog	Nominated
2024	"Fortnight"	Best Cinematography in a Music Video	Won

Other awards

Year	Award	Category	Title	Result
1996	Ariel Awards	Best Cinematography	All of Them Witches	Won
1999	Ariel Awards	Best Cinematography	Fibra Óptica	Nominated
1999	Ariel Awards	Best Cinematography	Un embrujo	Won
1999	San Sebastián International Film Festival	Jury Prize for Best Cinematography	Un embrujo	Won
2001	Ariel Awards	Best Cinematography	Amores perros	Won
2003	Chlotrudis Awards	Best Cinematography	21 Grams	Nominated
2005	Circuit Community Awards	Best Cinematography	Brokeback Mountain	Nominated
2005	Boston Society of Film Critics	Best Cinematography	Brokeback Mountain	Runner-up
2005	Chicago Film Critics Association	Best Cinematography	Brokeback Mountain	Won
2005	Dallas–Fort Worth Film Critics Association	Best Cinematography	Brokeback Mountain	Won
2005	Florida Film Critics Circle	Best Cinematography	Brokeback Mountain	Won
2005	International Cinephile Society Awards	Best Cinematography	Brokeback Mountain	Runner-up Tied
2005	International Online Cinema Awards (INOCA)	Best Cinematography	Brokeback Mountain	Nominated
2005	North Texas Film Critics Association	Best Cinematography	Brokeback Mountain	Won
2005	Online Film & Television Association	Best Cinematography	Brokeback Mountain	Won
2005	Online Film Critics Society Award	Best Cinematography	Brokeback Mountain	Won
2005	Phoenix Film Critics Society Awards	Best Cinematography	Brokeback Mountain	Won
2005	St. Louis Film Critics Association	Best Cinematography	Brokeback Mountain	Nominated
2006	Circuit Community Awards	Best Cinematography	Babel	Nominated
2006	Chicago Film Critics Association	Best Cinematography	Babel	Nominated
2006	Dallas–Fort Worth Film Critics Association	Best Cinematography	Babel	Runner-up Tied
2006	International Online Cinema Awards (INOCA)	Best Cinematography	Babel	Nominated
2006	Online Film Critics Society Award	Best Cinematography	Babel	Nominated
2006	St. Louis Film Critics Association	Best Cinematography	Babel	Nominated
2008	Independent Spirit Awards	Best Cinematography	Lust, Caution	Nominated
2007	Golden Horse Film Festival and Awards	Best Cinematography	Lust, Caution	Nominated
2007	International Cinematographers'; Film Festival Manaki Brothers	Golden Camera 300	Lust, Caution	Won
2007	Venice Film Festival	Golden Osella Best cinematography	Lust, Caution	Won
2009	Cinema Writers Circle Awards, Spain	Best Cinematography	Broken Embraces	Nominated
2010	Ariel Awards	Best Cinematography	Biutiful	Won
2010	Goya Awards	Best Cinematography	Biutiful	Nominated
2010	CinEuphoria Awards	Best Cinematography	Biutiful	Nominated
2012	Tribeca Film Festival	Jury Award Best Cinematography	Likeness	Nominated
2016	Circuit Community Awards	Best Cinematography	Silence	Nominated
2016	Chicago Film Critics Association	Best Cinematography	Silence	Nominated
2016	Dallas–Fort Worth Film Critics Association	Best Cinematography	Silence	Runner-up
2016	Georgia Film Critics Association	Best Cinematography	Silence	Nominated
2016	International Cinephile Society Awards	Best Cinematography	Silence	Runner-up
2016	International Online Cinema Awards (INOCA)	Best Cinematography	Silence	Nominated
2016	National Society of Film Critics	Best Cinematography	Silence	Nominated
2016	Online Film & Television Association	Best Cinematography	Silence	Nominated
2016	Phoenix Film Critics Society Awards	Best Cinematography	Silence	Nominated
2016	San Francisco Bay Area Film Critics Circle	Best Cinematography	Silence	Nominated
2019	Critics' Choice Awards	Best Cinematography	The Irishman	Nominated
2019	Dublin Film Critics' Circle	Best Cinematography	The Irishman	6th Place
2019	Houston Film Critics Society	Best Cinematography	The Irishman	Nominated
2019	Latino Entertainment Journalists; Association Film Awards	Best Cinematography	The Irishman	Nominated
2019	North Texas Film Critics Association	Best Cinematography	The Irishman	Nominated
2019	Online Film Critics Society Award	Best Cinematography	The Irishman	Nominated
2019	Phoenix Critics Circle	Best Cinematography	The Irishman	Nominated
2019	San Diego Film Critics Society	Best Cinematography	The Irishman	Nominated
2019	Satellite Awards	Best Cinematography	The Irishman	Nominated
2019	St. Louis Film Critics Association	Best Cinematography	The Irishman	Nominated
2019	Washington D.C. Area Film Critics Association	Best Cinematography	The Irishman	Nominated
2021	Vilcek Foundation	Vilcek Prize in Filmmaking		Won
2024	MTV Video Music Awards	Best Cinematography	"Fortnight"	Nominated
2026	MTV Video Music Awards	Best Cinematography	"The Fate of Ophelia"	Nominated

== See also ==
- Cinema of Mexico
