= Charm School (film) =

2007 Mexican movie

- Mexican theatrical release poster
- Directed by: Fernando Sariñana
- Screenplay by: Jose Balido; Ignacio Darnaude; Issa López; Carolina Rivera
- Produced by: Fernando Sariñana; Gerardo Rene Arellano
- Starring: Martha Higareda; Blanca Guerra
- Cinematography: Chava Cartas
- Edited by: Óscar Figueroa
- Production company: Columbia Pictures Producciones México
- Distributed by: Sony Pictures Releasing International
- Release date: 9 March 2007
- Running time: 100 minutes
- Country: Mexico
- Language: Spanish
- Box office: $7.2 million

Charm School (Spanish: Niñas mal; also titled Bad Girls) is a 2007 Mexican coming-of-age teen comedy film directed by Fernando Sariñana. It stars Martha Higareda as Adela, a rebellious teenager who is sent to a strict finishing school run by Maca (Blanca Guerra), where she undergoes personal growth.

The film was released theatrically in Mexico on 9 March 2007 by Sony Pictures Releasing International. It received mixed reviews but was a commercial success, grossing over $7.2 million worldwide. Niñas mal was adapted into a telenovela of the same name, produced by Sony Pictures Television and broadcast by MTV. In 2025, a spin-off of the telenovela, also produced by Sony, was announced.

== Plot ==
Adela is a rebellious young woman whose behavior causes tension with her father, who is a politician and single. One day, she accidentally sets a theater stage on fire during a performance, leading to her arrest and threatening her father's public image. To curb her behavior, her father confines her and requires her to attend Doña Macarena "Maca" Ribera's finishing school, promising to finance Adela's long-desired acting studies in London if she complies.

At the school, Adela meets several students, including Maribel, who struggles with clumsiness; Valentina, a musically talented student sent there following conflicts with her family for being a lesbian; Heidi, who is engaged to the son of a wealthy man and attends to learn proper etiquette; and Pia, an intelligent but socially reserved student who has difficulty forming romantic relationships. The girls receive instruction in domestic and social skills under Maca's strict guidance.

During her time at the school, Adela forms friendships with the girls and staff and begins a romantic relationship with Emiliano, a maintenance worker. Although initially resistant, she gradually becomes more cooperative and develops a mutual understanding with Maca.

Meanwhile, Adela's father faces mounting political pressure, culminating in a high-profile dinner intended to present Adela as well-mannered. During the event, Adela publicly reveals family secrets and misunderstandings, challenging the expectations of the adults involved. After completing the course, the students pursue different paths: Heidi reconciles with her fiancé, Maribel opens her own finishing school, Valentina continues her music career alongside her girlfriend, and Pia enters a romantic relationship. Adela departs for London to study acting, while Maca closes the school to begin a television career.

== Cast ==
- Martha Higareda as Adela León
- Blanca Guerra as Macarena "Maca" Ribera
- Camila Sodi as Pía
- Cecilia Ludmila Ponce as Heidi
- Ximena Sariñana as Valentina
- María Aura as Maribel
- Alejandra Adame as Heidi
- Zaide Silvia Gutiérrez as Fina
- Salvador Sánchez as Monseñor
- Rafael Sánchez Navarro as Martín León
