= Lucía, Lucía =

2003 film by Antonio Serrano

- Spanish theatrical release poster
- Spanish: La hija del caníbal
- Directed by: Antonio Serrano
- Written by: Antonio Serrano
- Based on: La hija del caníbal by Rosa Montero
- Produced by: Carlos Payán; Epigmenio Ibarra; Andrés Vicente Gómez; Matthias Ehrenberg
- Starring: Cecilia Roth; Carlos Álvarez-Nóvoa; Kuno Becker
- Cinematography: Xavier Pérez Grobet
- Edited by: Jorge García
- Music by: Nacho Mastretta
- Production companies: Titán Producciones; Argos Comunicación; LolaFilms
- Distributed by: 20th Century Fox (Mexico); United International Pictures (Spain)
- Release dates: 17 January 2003 (Mexico); 21 November 2003 (Spain)
- Running time: 110 minutes
- Countries: Mexico; Spain
- Language: Spanish
- Budget: €3.3 million MXN$30 million USD$2.75 million
- Box office: $269,586

Lucía, Lucía (Spanish: La hija del caníbal, lit. 'The Cannibal's Daughter') is a 2003 crime comedy-drama film written and directed by Antonio Serrano, based on the 1997 novel La hija del caníbal by Rosa Montero. The film stars Cecilia Roth, Carlos Álvarez-Nóvoa and Kuno Becker.

== Plot ==
Lucía, a children's book writer, is travelling to Brazil with her husband on vacation, when her husband disappears after going to the airport bathroom. She later learns that he was kidnapped by a group called the People Workers Party that wants 20 million pesos from her. Her husband frantically tells her to find the money in his aunt's safe deposit box. With the help of her neighbours, a Spanish Civil War veteran, and a young musician, Lucía sets out to find his kidnappers. She eventually discovers the truth about his disappearance after learning from the police that her husband is accused of being part of an elaborate embezzlement scam from within the Treasury Department of the government and may have possibly faked his kidnapping.

== Cast ==
- Cecilia Roth as Lucía
- Kuno Becker as Adrián
- Carlos Álvarez-Nóvoa as Félix
- Javier Díaz Dueñas as Inspector García
- Margarita Isabel as Lucía's mother
- Max Kerlow as Old Wehner
- Mario Iván Martínez as Mr. Wehner
- José Elías Moreno as Ramón
- Héctor Ortega as The Cannibal
- Enrique Singer as Undersecretary Ortiga

== Production ==
The novel

The film was shot over a period of eight weeks in and around Mexico City, as well as at the Puebla airport and the Sierra Gorda of Querétaro. In the United States the film was released under the name Lucía, Lucía, since the producers thought the name La hija del caníbal (literally, "The cannibal's daughter") would lead audiences to believe the story was about a cannibal.

== Reception ==
Lucía, Lucía was not as successful as Serrano's first film Sexo, Pudor y Lágrimas. Its box-office output in Mexico was MNX$10 million (under a million dollars). In Spain, it was released on 21 November 2003 in 100 theaters. In the United States, the film grossed $269,586 in 50 theatres. It is the 204th highest grossing foreign film in the United States.

On the review aggregator website Rotten Tomatoes, 45% of 49 critics' reviews are positive, with an average rating of 5.5/10. The website's consensus reads: "A relatively simple mid-life crisis story is burdened by overly cumbersome plot devices." Metacritic, which uses a weighted average, assigned the film a score of 51 out of 100, based on 22 critics, indicating "mixed or average" reviews.

=== Accolades ===
The film was nominated for the following awards:

- Ariel Award in 2004 from the Mexican Academy of Film for "Best Adapted Script" (Antonio Serrano)
- MTV Movie Awards Mexico for:
  - "Favourite Actor" (Kuno Becker)
  - "Best Song" (Kinky's Caníbal)

== See also ==
- List of Mexican films of 2003
- List of Spanish films of 2003
