= Macho (film) =

- Directed by: Antonio Serrano
- Written by: Sabina Berman
- Starring: Miguel Rodarte; Cecilia Suárez; Aislinn Derbez; Ana de la Reguera; Renato López
- Release date: 11 November 2016 (Mexico City)
- Country: Mexico
- Language: Spanish

Macho is a 2016 Mexican comedy film, directed by Antonio Serrano and starring Miguel Rodarte, Cecilia Suárez, Aislinn Derbez, Ana de la Reguera, and Renato López.

Paul Julian Smith describes the film as a "post-homophobic comedy"; it is an example of the new wave of Mexican LGBT+ cinema.

== Release ==
It was released to cinemas on November 11, 2016. In the first three weeks of its release, up to November 27, it grossed 32 million Mexican pesos (ca. 1.6 million US dollars) and was seen by 740,000 viewers.

Renato López was murdered less than two weeks after the box-office debut.

== Response ==
Response to the film, from critics and viewers, has been negative. Smith notes that all critics have compared the film to the 1969 René Cardona Jr. and Mauricio Garcés film Modisto de señoras when reviewing it, and that these comparisons are not kind to the social representations in Macho, especially considering it was made over 40 years after Modisto; Serrano denied taking inspiration from the film. Reviewers also view the film negatively in comparison to Serrano's own earlier gay-themed film, Sex, Shame and Tears (which also starred Suárez), and condemn its vision of women as being "objectified for the straight male viewer or vilified".

Smith says that the film's genre is "confused" and that it veers between "social critique, farce, and romantic comedy". He concludes that while it is relatively modern in theme, the handling of the gay narrative is no more advanced than the 1970s sex comedies.
