= Fine Young Men =

- Theatrical release poster
- Directed by: Alejandro Andrade
- Written by: Alejandro Andrade; Armando López
- Produced by: Alejandro Andrade; Armando Andrade; María del Puy Alvarado; Fredy Garza Wollenstein
- Starring: Andrés Revo; María Aura; Tomás Rojas; Emilio Puente; Pablo Delgado; Héctor Kuri Hernández; Arianna Hermosilla; Joaquín Emanuel; Moisés Arizmendi; Norma Pablo; Verónica Toussaint
- Cinematography: César Gutiérrez Miranda
- Edited by: Alejandro Andrade; David Montoro; Martha Poly Vil
- Music by: Christina Rosenvinge
- Production companies: Pisito Trece Producciones; Alameda Films; Home Films; Local Films; Malvalanda
- Distributed by: Syldavia Cinema (Spain)
- Release dates: October 21, 2024 (FICM); May 23, 2025 (Spain)
- Running time: 89 minutes
- Countries: Mexico; Spain; France
- Language: Spanish

Fine Young Men (Spanish: Hombres íntegros) is a 2024 thriller drama film co-written, co-produced and directed by Alejandro Andrade. It stars Andrés Revo as a gay teenager who is forcibly involved in a crime by his group of friends. It is a co-production between Mexico, Spain and France.

== Synopsis ==
Alf is a privileged teenager who returns to school after a year away. Now he no longer identifies with his usual friends, the athletes and the popular ones, but instead begins to bond with Oliver, a new student who is completely different from the rest of the kids. Alf will face the transition to adulthood alone while becoming involved in a crime, an event that will deeply fracture the relationship between Alf and Oliver.

== Cast ==
The actors participating in this film are:

- Andrés Revo as Alf
- Joaquín Emanuel as Oliver
- María Aura as Margarita
- Tomás Rojas as Alfredo
- Mai Elissalt as Pauline
- Emilio Puente as Laker
- Moisés Arizmendi as Roberto
- Héctor Kuri Hernández as Borja
- Isaac Cherem as Cure 2
- Norma Pablo as Nancy
- Verónica Toussaint as Jessica
- Concepción Márquez as Alf's Grandmother

== Production ==
Principal photography began on October 22, 2022, and ended on December 5 of the same year, in Mexico City and lasted 6 weeks.

== Release ==
Fine Young Men had its world premiere on October 21, 2024, at the 22nd Morelia International Film Festival, then screened on February 11, 2025, at the 40th Santa Barbara International Film Festival, on March 14, 2025, at the 9th Tequila International Film Festival, on March 18, 2025, at the 12th Muestra Intergaláctica, on March 28, 2025, at the 6th MICMXIFF International Film Festival, on April 18, 2025, at the 27th OUTshine Film Festival, on April 28, 2025, at the Milwaukee Film Festival, on June 25, 2025, at the 29th Festival MIX México - Cine, Diversidad Sexual y de Género, on June 28, 2025, at the Bangkok Gay and Lesbian Film Festival, on July 7, 2025, at the Rio International Cinema Festival LGTBQIA+ Film Festival, and is scheduled for August 22, 2025, at the 25th FilmOUT San Diego Fine.

Distributed by Syldavia Cinema, the film was released commercially on May 23, 2025, in Spanish theaters.

== Accolades ==
Year	Award / Festival	Category	Recipient	Result	Ref.
2024	22nd Morelia International Film Festival	Best Mexican Feature Film	Fine Young Men	Nominated	
2024	22nd Morelia International Film Festival	Best Actor	Andrés Revo	Won	
2025	9th Tequila International Film Festival	Best Actor	Andrés Revo	Won	
2025	9th Tequila International Film Festival	Best Screenplay	Fine Young Men	Won	
2025	12th Muestra Intergaláctica	Best Film	Andrés Revo	Won	
2025	6th MICMXIFF International Film Festival	Best Mexican Fiction Feature Film	Fine Young Men	Won	
2025	6th MICMXIFF International Film Festival	Special Sponsor Prize	Fine Young Men	Won	
2025	67th Ariel Awards	Best Breakthrough Performance	Andrés Revo	Nominated	
2025	67th Ariel Awards	Best Original Screenplay	Alejandro Andrade & Armando López	Nominated	
