= Una luz en el camino =

- Genre: Children's Telenovela
- Directed by: Benjamín Cann; Alfredo Gurrola
- Starring: Guillermo Capetillo; Veronica Merchant; Mariana Botas; Susana Zabaleta; Zaide Silvia Gutiérrez
- Opening theme: Una luz en el camino by Cast children
- Country of origin: Mexico
- Original language: Spanish
- No. of episodes: 90

Production
- Executive producer: Mapat L. de Zatarain
- Production locations: Filming; Televisa San Ángel; Mexico City, Mexico
- Running time: 21-22 minutes (episodes 1-15); 41-44 minutes (episodes 16-90)
- Production company: Televisa

Original release
- Network: Canal de las Estrellas
- Release: March 30 – July 31, 1998

Una luz en el camino (English: A Light on the Road) is a Mexican children's telenovela produced by Mapat L. de Zatarain for Televisa in 1998. It is an adaptation of the 1991–1992 Argentinian children's telenovela El árbol azul.

On Monday, March 30, 1998, Canal de las Estrellas started broadcasting Una luz en el camino weekdays at 4:30pm, replacing Sin tí. The last episode was broadcast on Friday, July 31, 1998, with Gotita de amor replacing it the following Monday.

Veronica Merchant and Guillermo Capetillo starred as protagonists, Mariana Botas starred as child protagonist, while Susana Zabaleta and Zaide Silvia Gutiérrez starred as antagonists.

== Cast ==
- Guillermo Capetillo as Rodrigo González de Alba
- Veronica Merchant as Marcela Villarreal
- Mariana Botas as Luciana González de Alba Olvera
- Susana Zabaleta as Astrid del Valle
- Zaide Silvia Gutiérrez as Elodia Vidal
- Ramón Abascal as Renato
- Luz María Aguilar as Clara González de Alba
- Marta Aura as Chole
- Mario Casillas as Don Eliseo de la Garza
- Eduardo Verástegui as Daniel
- Eugenia Cauduro as Luisa Fernanda
- Orlando Miguel as Miguel
- María Marcela as Lorena
- Otto Sirgo as Father Federico
- Graciela Döring as Margarita
- Tere López Tarín as Yolanda
- Archie Lafranco as Juan Carlos
- Arturo Barba as Enrique
- Fernando Nesme as José Ramón
- Bárbara Ferré as Mercedes
- Rolando Brito as Bruno San Martín
- Gretel Rocha as Paulina
- Naydelin Navarrete as Vicky de los Santos
- Mayte Iturralde as Lupita
- Luis Fernando Madrid as Pablito
- Roberto Marín as Marco
- Nicky Mondellini as Victoria de de los Santos
- Perla Jasso as Bertha
- José Antonio Marros as Don Pablo
- Gabriel Mijares as Manolo
- Claudia Ortega as Hortensia
- Nayeli Pellicer as Celia
- Radamés de Jesús as Darío
- Silvia Eugenia Derbez as Magda
- Edmundo Ibarra as Germán
- Patricio Castillo as Tomás
- Antonio Escobar as Armando
- Benjamín Islas as Ismael
- Mickey Santana as Andrés
- Valerie Sirgo as Ivonne
- Óscar Traven as Luis Trejo
- Martha Navarro as Consuelo
- Andrea Legarreta as Ana Olvera de González
- Marcela de Galina as María Marcela
- Karla Kegel as Susana
- Paola Kegel as Silvana
