= Shanik Berman =

Mexican entertainment journalist (born 1959)

- Born: Anita Janeth Martin Goodman; April 11, 1959 (age 67); Mexico City, Mexico
- Occupations: Journalist; writer; TV host
- Years active: 1986-present
- Spouse: Jorge Berman (m. 1980)
- Children: 2
- Relatives: Sabina Berman (sister-in-law)

Shanik Martin Goodman de Berman (born Anita Janeth Martin Goodman; April 11, 1959) is a Mexican journalist, writer and tv host. She was born in Mexico City to Jewish immigrant parents from Czechoslovakia (now Slovakia) who immigrated after surviving the Second World War. She has studied Literature and Languages in Mexico, Paris and the United States.

Berman became a showbiz reporter since and has since then become one of the icons of Showbiz Journalism in Mexico. Her staple show Intimamente Shanik was a pioneer in Mexican Television in handling previously censored subjects such as sex, divorces, infidelity, etc.

Currently she writes a column for some of the newspapers with largest readership in México such as El Sol de México and El Heraldo, as well as sports or tabloid papers like ESTO, La Prensa, and Basta!. She has a show business column with interviews of celebrities in the best-selling gossip magazine in México: “TVNOTAS”

She has a daily radio show Shanik en Fórmula broadcast through Radio Fórmula in Mexico, Latin America and USA which airs from Monday to Sunday. She is the author of Muy cerca del ombligo (1985) a satire about the showbiz world in México and she also wrote “Más cornadas da el Hombre” a book about bullfighters.

She started her journalistic career in 1980. She worked in All the Univisión tv shows that were about show business, Among them: “Escándalo”, “La Tijera”, “Tómbola”, “Cristina Show”, and“Sal y pimienta”

She has worked as one of the main show business journalists in all the gossip tv shows in Mexican National television such as: “La Oreja”, “Con todo”, “Vida tv”, “Viva la mañana”, “De buenas a la 1”, “D poca”, “Tv de Noche”, “Muévete”, “Nxclusiva”, “ARRIESGA TV”, “Pasillo tv”, and “El Coque va”

She has since a few years a show business section in the tv morning show in Mexican National television: “HOY”.

She participated as herself in the soap opera “el triunfo del amor” with the main actor William Levy in 2010. She has her own YouTube channel ShanikTV.
