= Coyote and Bronca =

- Directed by: Rafael Villaseñor Kuri
- Written by: Adolfo Torres Portillo
- Produced by: Vicente Fernández
- Starring: Vicente Fernández; Blanca Guerra; Felipe Arriaga; Gloria Marín
- Cinematography: Xavier Cruz
- Edited by: Maximino Sánchez Molina
- Music by: Ernesto Cortázar II
- Production company: Cima Films
- Release date: 3 April 1980
- Running time: 90 minutes
- Country: Mexico
- Language: Spanish

Coyote and Bronca (Spanish: El Coyote y la Bronca) is a 1980 Mexican adventure film directed by Rafael Villaseñor Kuri and starring Vicente Fernández, Blanca Guerra, Felipe Arriaga and Gloria Marín.

== Cast ==
- Vicente Fernández as Juan Mireles / El Coyote
- Blanca Guerra as María Trinidad / La Bronca
- Gloria Marín as Señora Marcia
- Angélica Vale as Amalia, niña
- Felipe Arriaga as El Cotija
- Estela Piquer as Amalia
- Carlos Derbez as Perseguidor
- Polo Ortín as Gerente hotel
- Freddy Fernández as Hijo de anciana
- Emma Roldán as Anciana enferma
- Carlos León as Perseguidor
- Mario Saavedra as Joven mojado
- Jennifer De Mello
- Queta Carrasco as Doña Leobarda, viejita chismosa
- José Nájera as Don Norberto
- Guillermo Lagunes
- Guillermo Álvarez Bianchi as Sacerdote
- Paco Sañudo as Empleado prostíbulo
- Regino Herrera as Abuelo
- Oscar Traven as Esbirro de Norberto
- Jorge Reynoso as Mojado
- Armando Martín as Juan, hijo del Coyote
- Elizabeth Aguilar as Prostituta
- Federico Falcón
- Diana Ferreti as Prostituta
- Inés Murillo as Nicanora, sirvienta
- José L. Murillo as Valerio
- María Prado as Mujer del Cotija
- Ángela Rodríguez as Woman in church

== Bibliography ==
- Ramírez Berg, Charles. Cinema of Solitude: A Critical Study of Mexican Film, 1967-1983. University of Texas Press, 2010.
