= Boston Society of Film Critics Awards 2005 =

Annual US film awards ceremony

26th BSFC Awards

December 11, 2005

Best Film:
Brokeback Mountain

The 26th Boston Society of Film Critics Awards, honoring the best in filmmaking in 2005, were given on 11 December 2005. This year's awards are dedicated to the memory of Robin Dougherty, a former Boston Phoenix film critic who died this summer.

== Winners ==
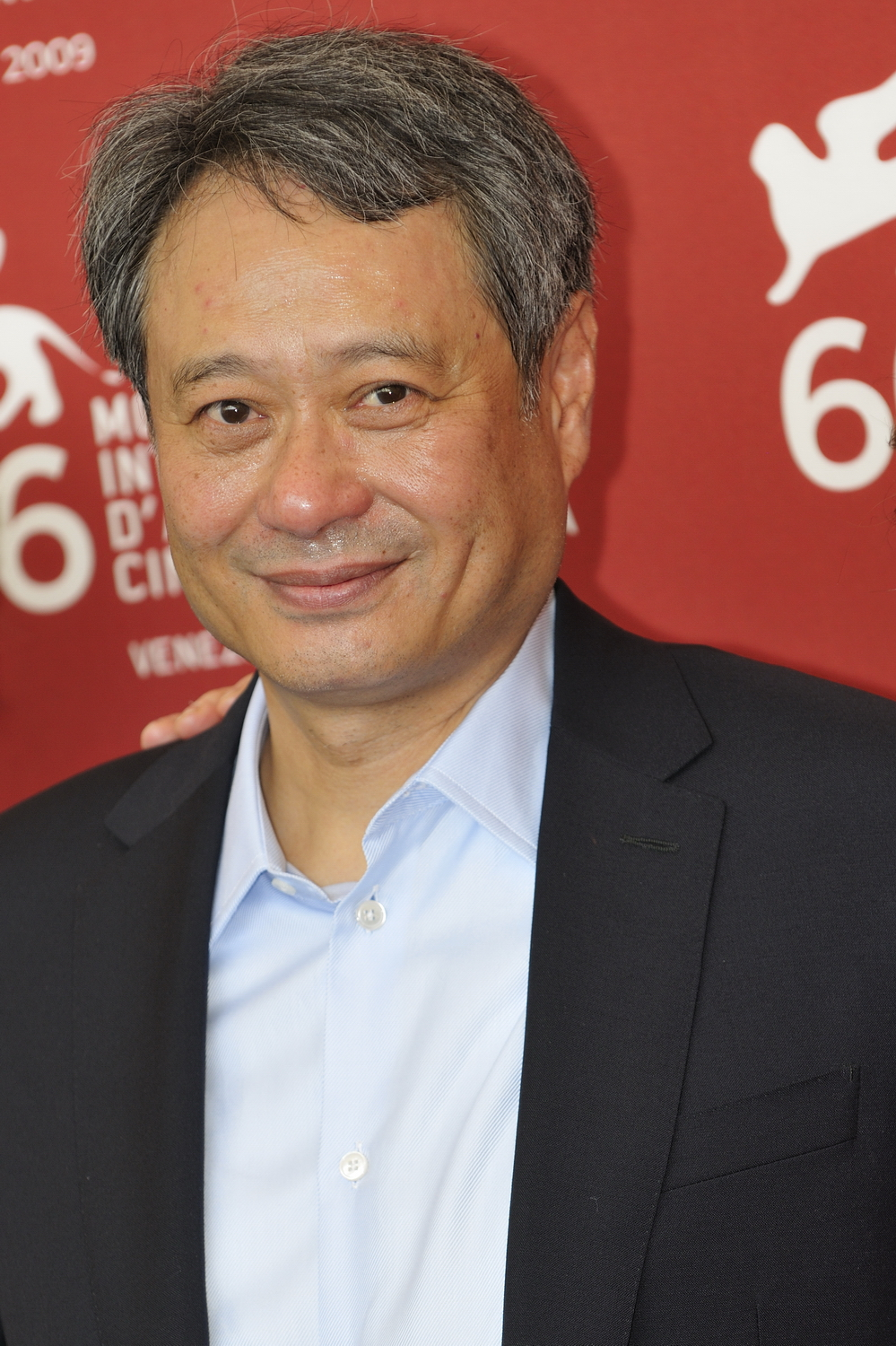
Ang Lee, Best Director winner

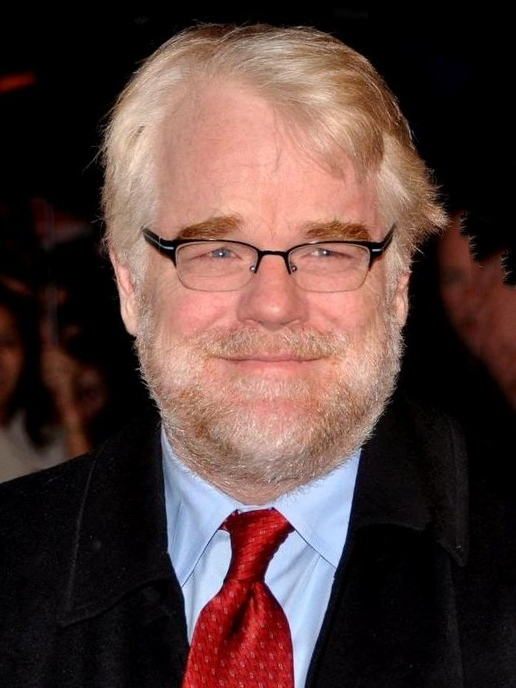
Philip Seymour Hoffman, Best Actor winner

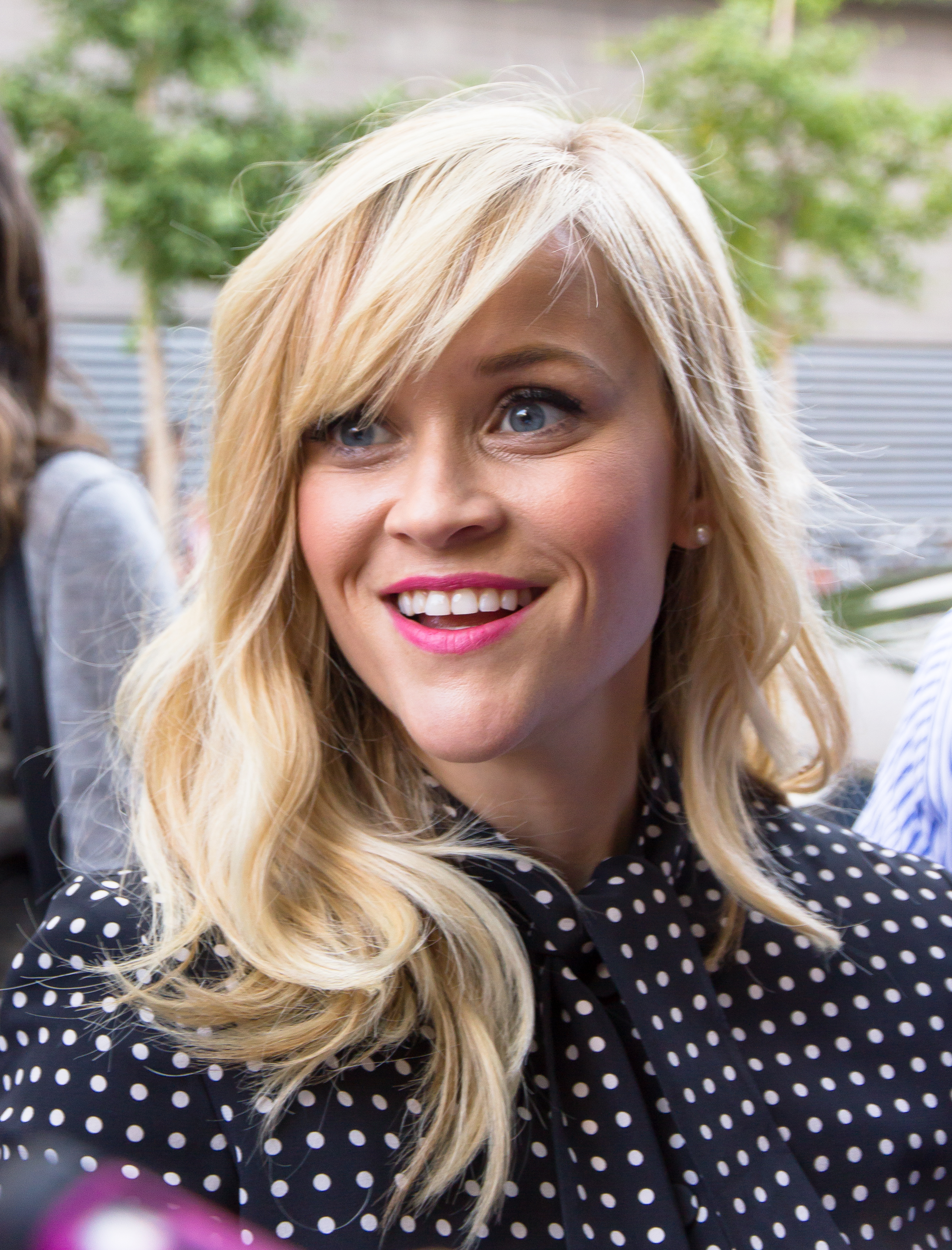
Reese Witherspoon, Best Actress winner

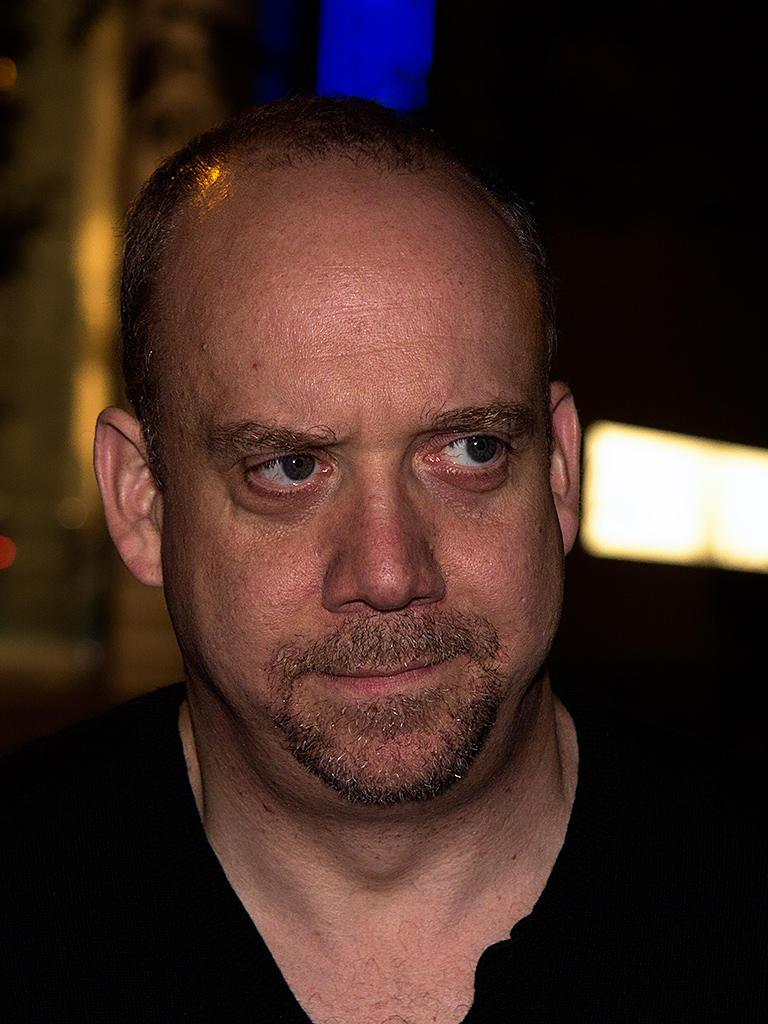
Paul Giamatti, Best Supporting Actor winner

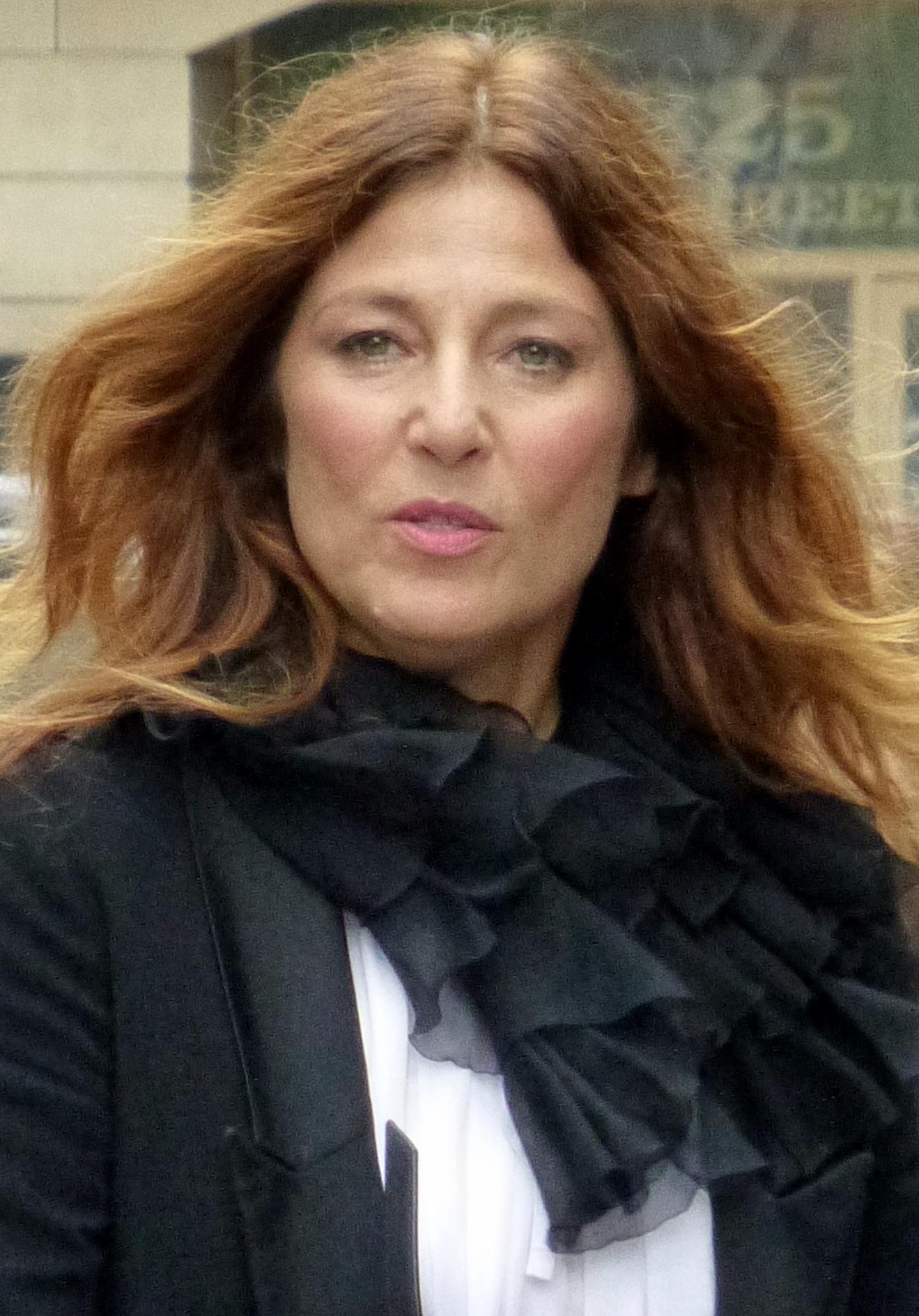
Catherine Keener, Best Supporting Actress winner

- Best Film:
  - Brokeback Mountain
  - Runner-up: Munich
- Best Actor:
  - Philip Seymour Hoffman – Capote
  - Runner-up: Heath Ledger – Brokeback Mountain
- Best Actress:
  - Reese Witherspoon – Walk the Line
  - Runner-up: Keira Knightley – Pride & Prejudice
- Best Supporting Actor:
  - Paul Giamatti – Cinderella Man
  - Runner-up: Oliver Platt – Casanova and The Ice Harvest
- Best Supporting Actress:
  - Catherine Keener – Capote, The 40-Year-Old Virgin and The Ballad of Jack and Rose
- Best Director:
  - Ang Lee – Brokeback Mountain
  - Runner-up: Steven Spielberg – Munich
- Best Screenplay:
  - Dan Futterman – Capote
  - Runner-up: Tony Kushner and Eric Roth – Munich
- Best Cinematography:
  - Robert Elswit – Good Night, and Good Luck.
  - Runner-up: Rodrigo Prieto – Brokeback Mountain
- Best Documentary:
  - Murderball
  - Runner-up: Grizzly Man
- Best Foreign-Language Film:
  - Kung Fu Hustle (Kung fu) • Hong Kong/China
  - Runner-up: 2046 • Hong Kong
- Best New Filmmaker:
  - Joe Wright – Pride & Prejudice
  - Runner-up: Paul Haggis – Crash
- Best Ensemble Cast:
  - Syriana
  - Runner-up: Crash
