= Verónica Toussaint =

Mexican actress (1976–2024)

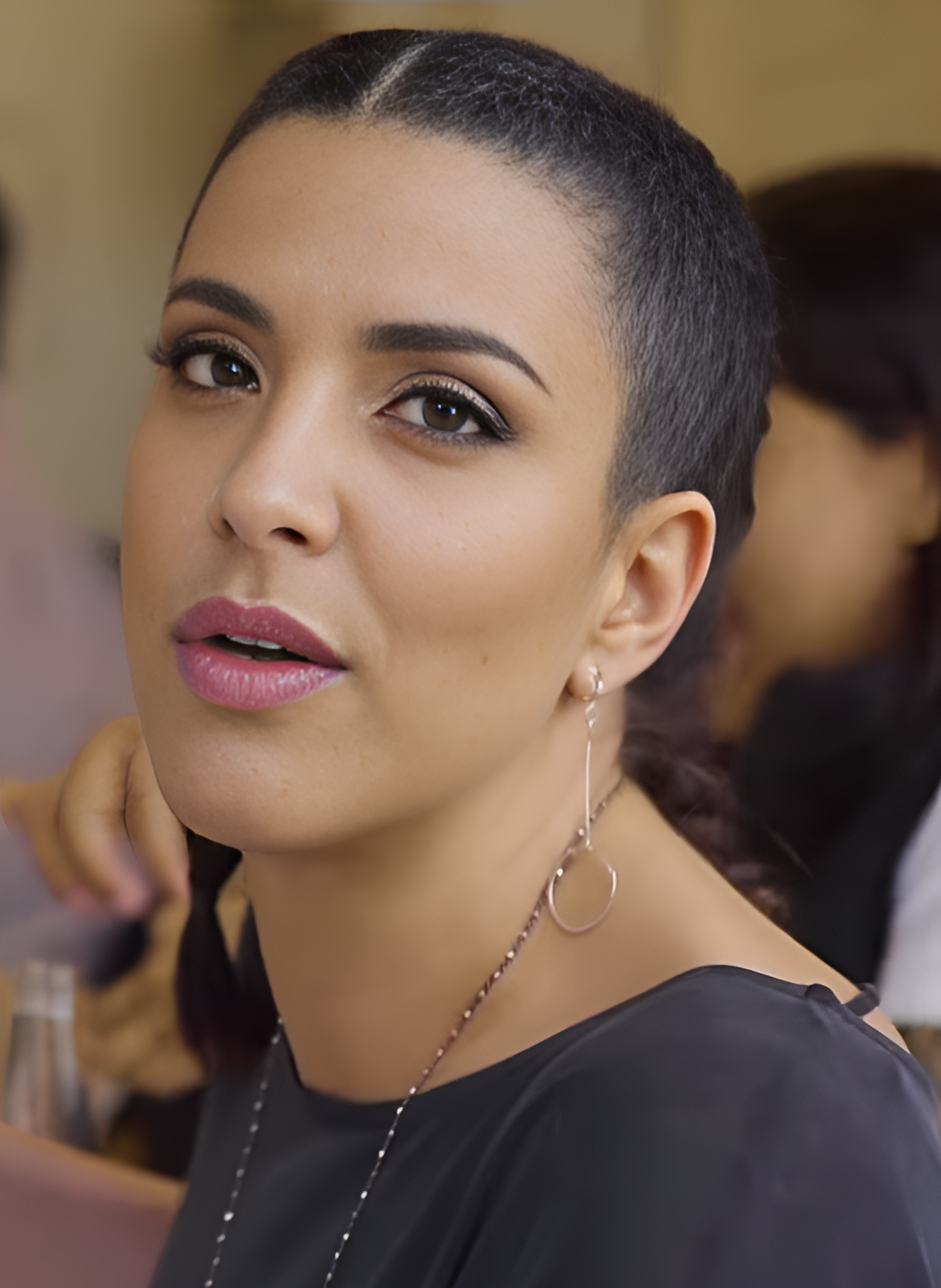
- Born: 15 March 1976; Monterrey, Mexico
- Died: 16 May 2024 (aged 48); Mexico City, Mexico
- Occupations: Actress: Actress; comedian; TV presenter
- Years active: 2001–2024

Verónica Eréndira Toussaint Rincón Gallardo (15 March 1976 – 16 May 2024), commonly known as Verónica Toussaint, was a Mexican television presenter, actress and comedian. Among her most notable works is her participation as presenter of the programs ¡Qué importa! (2016–2020) and ¡Qué chulada! (2020–2024), and her roles as an actress in the films Polar Bear (2017) and Impossible Things (2021).

== Early life and education ==
Verónica Eréndira Toussaint Rincón Gallardo was born on 15 March 1976 in Monterrey, Nuevo León, being the youngest of three children of a family therapist and florist. Her family, well off financially, was originally from Mexico City, so shortly after she was born she was taken to live there. She graduated with a degree in communication from the Universidad Anáhuac México, a private institution. However, Toussaint's true passion was acting, so she decided to train as an actress at the Núcleo de Estudios Teatrales, a private school specialized in training actors.

== Career ==
In 2001, Toussaint made her debut as an actress, participating with a supporting role in the telenovela Cara o cruz, produced by Telemundo. Years later, she established herself at the television station Imagen Televisión, where she established herself as a comedian thanks to the program ¡Qué importa!, a comedy news broadcast that she joined in 2016 and which she left in 2020. In 2018, she received her first and only Ariel Award in the category of best female co-acting, a prize obtained thanks to her work in the 2017 film Polar Bear. This production also earned her the award for best actress at the 2018 Hermosillo International Film Festival.

In 2021, Toussaint had a supporting role in the film Impossible Things, which although it was very brief and without dialogue, stood out for her lip synchronization singing the song "El día" performed by Angélica María.

From 2020 and until the end of her career, she was the host of the Imagen Televisión program, ¡Qué chulada!, in which in 2021, she publicly shared that she had breast cancer. Also, she participated in Alejandro Andrade's drama film Fine Young Men.

== Illness and death ==
On 16 May 2024, after being hospitalized for ten days in a hospital in Mexico City, Toussaint died at the age of 48 from breast cancer. Two days later, after her funeral was held at the Panteón Francés de San Joaquín, her body was cremated and her ashes were delivered to her family. Her brother shared that per Toussaint's will, her remains would be scattered in a place they would choose later.
