= Roberto Cobo =

Mexican actor (1930–2022)

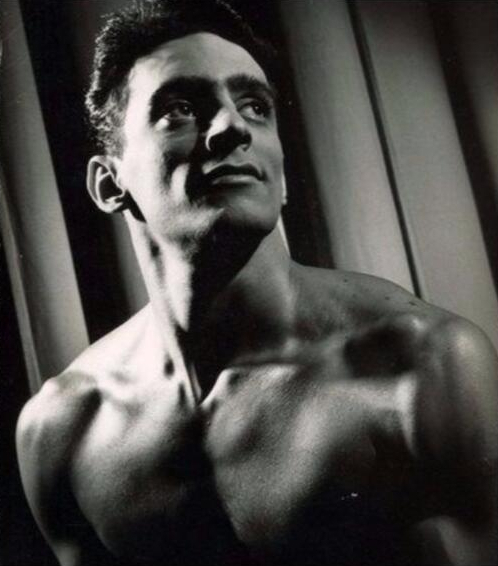
- Cobo, c. 1950s
- Born: Roberto Garcìa Romero; 20 February 1930; General Zuazua, Nuevo León, Mexico
- Died: 2 August 2002 (aged 72); Mexico City, Mexico
- Occupation: Actor
- Years active: 1948–2002

Roberto Garcìa Romero (20 February 1930 – 2 August 2002), better known as Roberto Cobo, was a Mexican actor. He appeared in more than eighty films between 1947 and 2002.

== Partial filmography ==
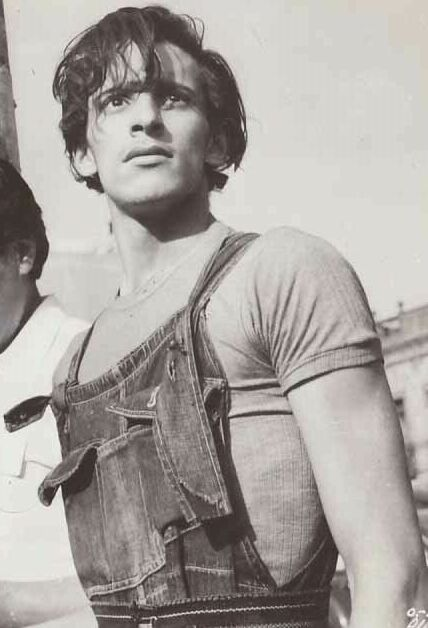
Roberto Cobo in Los olvidados (1950)

Year	Title	Role
1948	Ahí Viene Vidal Tenorio	Unknown
1950	The Young and the Damned	El Jaibo
1951	Mexican Bus Ride	Juan
1961	Jóvenes y bellas	Rafael Paz
1961	Se alquila marido	Unknown
1963	Échenme al vampiro	Unknown
1965	Viento Negro	Ingeniero Carlos Jiménez
1978	Life Sentence	Gallito
1978	The Place Without Limits	La Manuela
1979	Amor libre	The Singer
1982	Ángel del barrio	Unknown
1983	Nocaut	Sultán
1984	Las glorias del Gran Púas	Unknown
1984	El Milusos II	Unknown
1985	Historias violentas	Unknown
1985	Violent Stories	Manolo
1989	La leyenda de una máscara	Jacinto
1989	Pancho Cachuchas	El compadre
1991	Cabeza de Vaca	Lozoya (as Roberto 'Calambres'
1994	La güera Chabela y Jesús Cadenas	Unknown
1996	Danik, el viajero del tiempo	Unknown
1996	All of Them Witches	Ferretero
1997	The Hole	el Pachuco
1997	Esmeralda Comes by Night	Don Virginio (# 2)
1999	Traveling Saints	Doña Trini
2000	Caimán's Dream	Tomasito
2002	Without Destiny	Sebastian
2003	Dame Tu Cuerpo	Duende
