= Santo Luzbel =

- Directed by: Miguel Sabido
- Written by: Miguel Sabido; Julio Palaez
- Produced by: Dulce Kuri; Gabriel Romo Alpuche
- Starring: Rafael Cortes; Victor Perez; Roberto Alvarez; Agustin Aviles; Ignacio López Tarso; Antonio Monroy; Carlos Pichardo
- Cinematography: Arturo De La Rosa; Jorge Suarez
- Edited by: Óscar Figueroa; Jara Jorge Suarez
- Music by: Musicaos de San Miguel Zincacapan
- Distributed by: IMCINE(international)
- Release date: 1997
- Running time: 101 minutes
- Country: Mexico
- Languages: Spanish & Nahuatl

Santo Luzbel is a 1997 Mexican drama film.

== Plot ==
The film takes place in a remote region (Cuetzalan and Yohualichan in the State of Puebla) of present-day Mexico where a majority of the population speaks Nahuatl as their mother tongue.

The movie's plot exploits a historical mistrust and conflict between Native Inhabitants of the region, represented by the Nahuatl-speaking inhabitants and the Spanish-speaking mestizo who identify themselves as being of higher social class and call themselves "Gente de razon". Intertwined in this main conflict there is a second conflict which opposes the view of a traditionalist priest (Ignacio Lopez Tarso) who sides with the Spanish-speakers and a more liberal priest who better understands the synchretism between Roman Catholicism and Indigenous beliefs. Both priests are Roman Catholic in charge of the parishes of the neighbouring towns.

The main conflict in the film explodes when the Mayordomos of Yohualichan decide to present a Theatrical representation of an ancient text, part in Nahuatl and part in Spanish, called the "Colloquium of the Adoration of the King". The Catholic priest of Yohualichan accuses the Nahuas of blasphemy since the text is over the discussion between the Archangel Michael and Santo Luzbel, seeing them as equals instead of good & evil. The Nahuas want to perform it in full costume in the town's church, much to the dismay of the everyone else.

== Cast ==
- Director Credit Miguel Sabido Director
- Cast Credit Rafael Cortes Emeterio Victor Perez Melchor Roberto Alvarez Cirilo Agustin Aviles Agustin Ignacio López Tarso Father Leopoldo Santos Higareda Antonio Monroy Olegario Carlos Pichardo Delfino Gonzalez
- Production Credits Credit Dulce Kuri Executive Producer Gabriel Romo Alpuche Producer
- Production Companies Credit Mexican Film Institute Production Company Producciones Nuevo Sol Production Company
- Distribution Companies Credit Desert Mountain Media Domestic Video Distributor
- Writer Credit Miguel Sabido Screenplay Julio Palaez Screenplay
- Art Department Credit Julio Pelaez Art Director
- Film Camera Credit Arturo De La Rosa Cinematographer - cinematography Jorge Suarez Cinematographer - cinematography
- Film Sales Financing Credit IMCINE Foreign Distribution Sales

=== Awards ===
It had 8 Academia Mexicana nomination.

=== Home video ===
Released on DVD in 2006. Special features include English subtitles.
