= Verónica Merchant =

Mexican actress (born 1967)

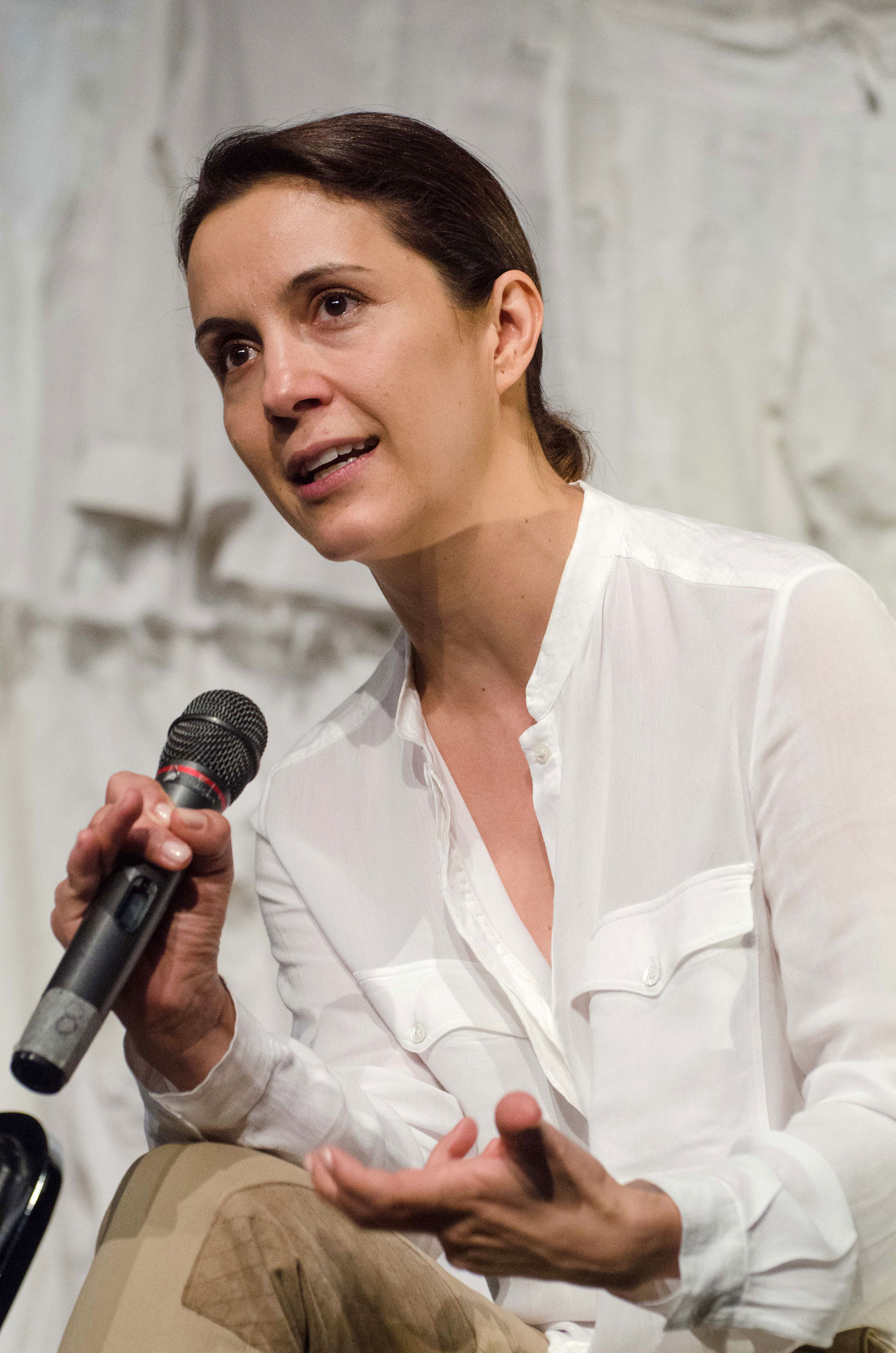
- Born: Verónica Merchant Nancy; November 28, 1967 (age 58); Mexicali, Baja California, Mexico
- Occupation: Actress
- Years active: 1987-present
- Spouse: Daniel Martínez (?-present)
- Children: Alexis; Valentina
- Parent(s): Horacio Merchant Larios; Marie Therese Nancy

Verónica Merchant (born November 28, 1967, in Mexicali, Baja California, Mexico) is a Mexican actress who played the role of Mariana Romero Vargas in the Mexican telenovela Corazón salvaje.

== Filmography ==
=== Film ===
- Dora y yo (1987)
- Tu hora esta marcada (1991)
- Ciudad de ciegos (1991) as Chica del departamento
- Principio y fin (1993) as Natalia
- Tiempo cautivo (1994)
- Una Maestra con Angel (1994)
- Hasta morir (1994) as Victoria
- Desiertos mares (1995) as Margarita
- Profundo carmesí (1996) as Rebeca Sanpedro
- Ciudad que se escapa (1998) as Lola
- Corazones rotos (2001) as Eva
- Manos libres (2005) as Ofelia
- Complot (2005) as Ana
- Enemigos íntimos (2008) as Rebecca
- Spam (2008) as Susana Duarte
- Navidad, S.A. as Martha (2008)

=== Television ===
Year	Title	Role	Notes
1993–94	Corazón salvaje	Mariana Romero Vargas	
1995	Alondra	María Elisa Escobar Díaz	
1995	Mujer, casos de la vida real		Episode: "Una lección de amor"
1995–96	Lazos de amor	Virginia Altamirano	
1996–97	Luz Clarita	Soledad Martínez	Main role
1998	Una luz en el camino	Marcela Villarreal	Main role
1998–99	El amor de mi vida	Clarisa Villaseñor	
2000	Tío Alberto	Marcela Díaz	Main role
2002	Agua y aceite	Margarita	
2005	Amor en custodia	Victoría	
2009	Eternamente tuya	Águeda Briseño de Castelán	
2010	Entre el amor y el deseo	Muriel	
2011	Huérfanas	Ana Julia Allende	Guest star
2012	Quererte así	Carmela Ramírez	
2013	Vivir a destiempo	Cristina de Delgado	
2015	Así en el barrio como en el cielo	Aurora Ferrara	Main role
2016	Hasta que te conocí	Esperanza Mcculley	
2016	Perseguidos	Irene Molina	Recurring role
2018	Atrapada	Daniela Vargas	Main cast
2018	Falsos falsificados	Moravia's wife	Recurring role
2021	La venganza de las Juanas	Susana Bravo	
2022	Mujer de nadie	Pilar Riveira	Main cast
2023	Ojitos de huevo	Lolis	Episode: "Un ciego debe hacer lo que un ciego debe hacer"
2024	Tu vida es mi vida	Isabella	Main cast
2025	La Jefa	Matilde de Guzmán	Main cast
2025–26	Doménica Montero	Pilar Rivas Peraza	Main cast

== Awards and nominations ==
=== Premios TVyNovelas ===
Year	Category	Telenovela	Result
1996	Best Co-star Actress	Alondra	Won
1997	Best Young Lead Actress	Luz Clarita	Won
