= Susana Zabaleta =

Mexican soprano singer and actress

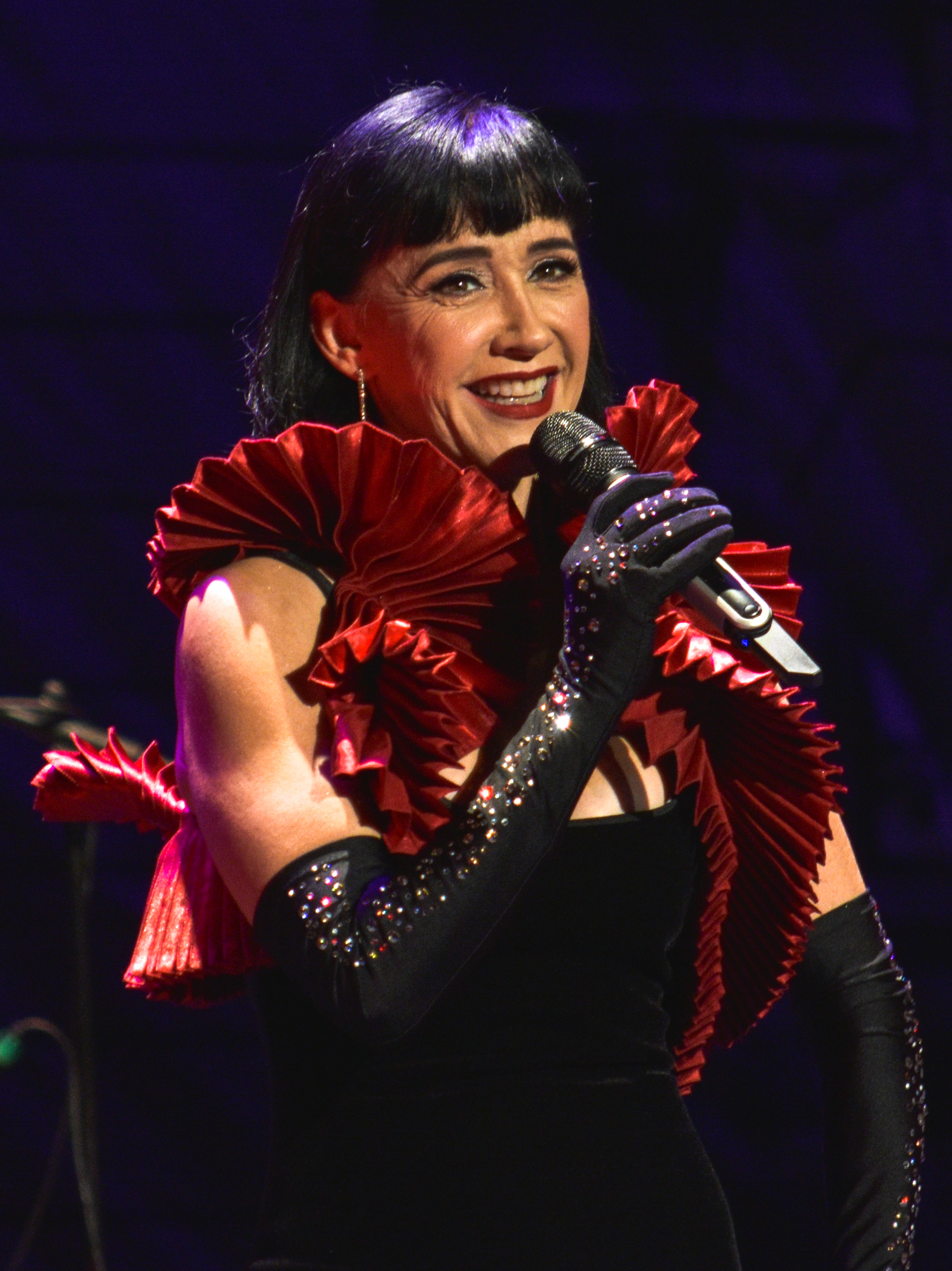
- Zabaleta in 2024
- Born: Susana Zabaleta Ramos; 30 September 1964 (age 61); Monclova, Coahuila, Mexico
- Occupations: Singer; actress
- Years active: 1986–present
- Spouse: Daniel Gruener (m. 1992; div. 2014)
- Children: 2
- Musical career
- Genres: Pop; opera
- Label: Consecuencias
- Website: Official website

Susana Zabaleta Ramos (Spanish pronunciation: [suˈsana saβaˈleta]; born 30 September 1964) is a Mexican soprano singer and actress.

== Early life ==
Born in Monclova, Coahuila, she is the daughter of Alfonso José Zabaleta Margaín and María Enriqueta Ramos; her paternal grandfather was Vicente Zabaleta Somellera, a Spanish immigrant from Ampuero, Cantabria, who arrived in Mexico in 1922 and was one of the pioneers of local commerce in the city in the early 20th century.

she moved to Mexico City in 1985. In 1986 she performed in the Sala Ollín Yoliztli and interpreted opera performances, such as La Traviata, Dido and Aeneas and Eneas. She also performed with the group Quien es quien.

== Career ==
In 1987 Zabaleta debuted on stage in the Mexican production of the musicals Fiddler on the Roof and Don Quijote de la Mancha. In 1989 she participated in the musicals ¡Que plantón! and Sor-Presas. In 1991 she participated in the Mexican production of Cats along with María del Sol.

In 1995, she recorded her first album titled ¿O fué un sueño? and in 1996, recorded the Spanish version of the song "Colors of the Wind" for the Disney film Pocahontas.

Zabaleta's acting career began in 1993 appearing in some telenovelas. In 1996 she starred in the horror film Sobrenatural, a film directed by her husband, the film director Daniel Gruener.

In 1999, she participated in the Mexican film Sexo, pudor y lagrimas (directed by Antonio Serrano) for which she won the Ariel Award for Best Actress.

In recent years, Zabaleta collaborated with the Mexican composer Armando Manzanero with whom she has recorded two albums: de la A a la Z (2006) and Amarrados (2009).

In 2011, Zabaleta debuted as host of her own TV show, Susana Adicción, on Unicable network.

== Filmography ==
=== Film ===
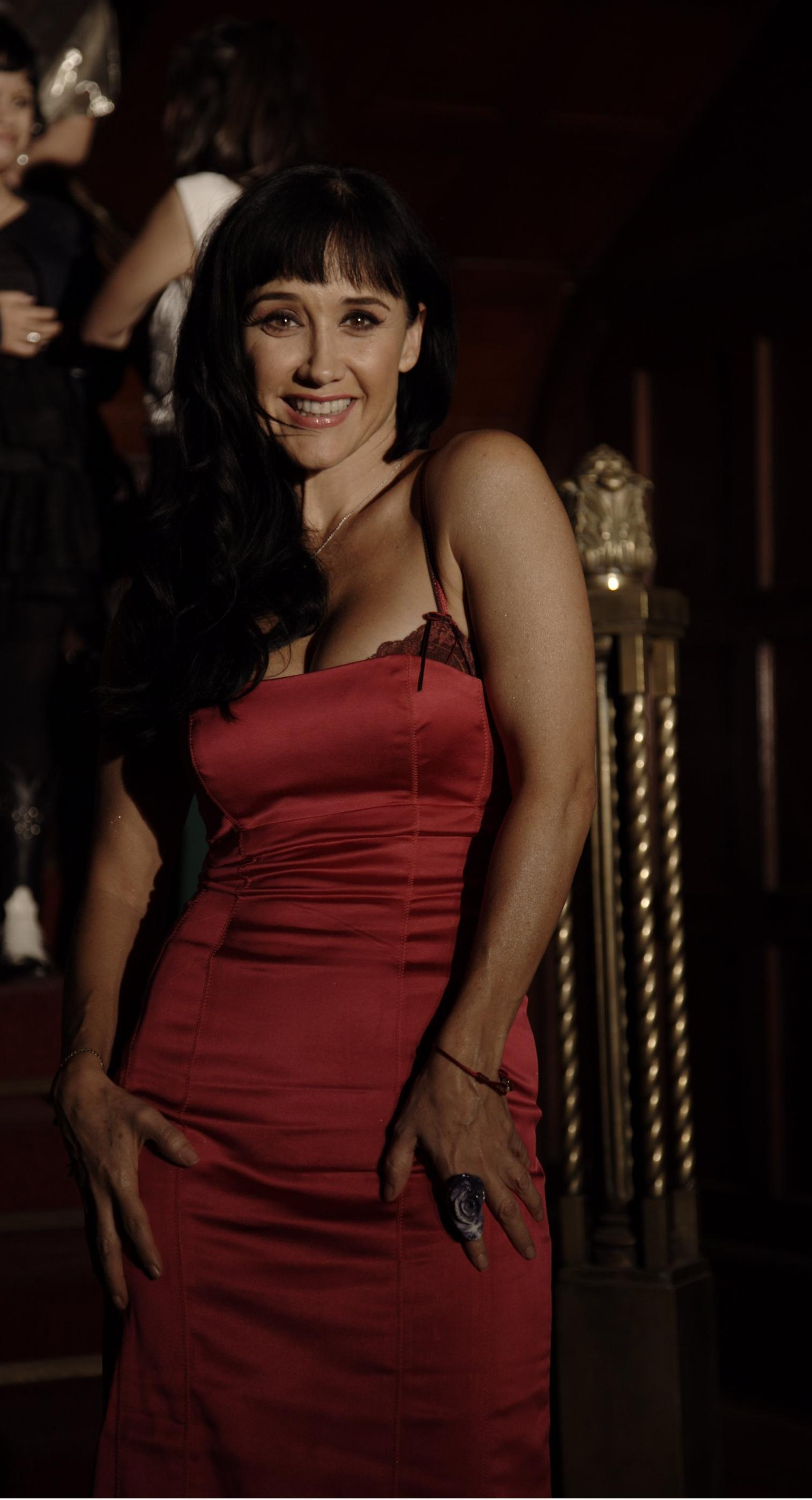
Zabaleta in 2009

Year	Title	Role
1996	Sobrenatural	Dolores Berthier
1997	Cossi fan Tutte	
1997	Elisa Before the End of the World	Elisa's Mother
1999	Sexo, pudor y lagrimas	Ana
1999	Crónica de un desayuno	
2001	Vivir Mata	Silvia
2023	La Usurpadora: The Musical	Dona Ines

=== Television ===
Year	Title	Role	Notes
1991	Milagro y Magia		
1996	La sombra del otro	Lic. Amaral	
1997	Pueblo chico, infierno grande	Medarda Zavala	Supporting Role
1998	Una luz en el camino	Astrid del Valle	
2000	Mi destino eres tu	Emma Pimentel de Rivadeneira	
2001	Salomé	Susana	Supporting Role
2002	Cultura en línea	Herself	Host
2003	Bajo la misma piel	Ivonne Acosta	
2006	Cantando por un sueño	Herself	Host
2008	S.O.S.: Sexo y otros Secretos	Sofía	
2008	Fuego en la sangre	Ruth Uribe Acevedo	
2009	Me quiero enamorar	Herself	Host
2011	Susana Adicción	Herself	Host
2012	Por Ella Soy Eva	Eva María León Jaramillo Vda. de Zuloaga / Yadira Rivers	Supporting Role

== Stage credits ==
Year	Title
1986	Barnum
1986	Fiddler on the Roof
1988	Magnolias de Acero
1988	Mi vida es mi vida
1988	Don Quijote de la Mancha
1989	Sor-Presas
1989	Que plantón!
1991	Cats
1995	Pocahontas con La Malinche
1998	El Teléfono
2000	Man of La Mancha
2002	The Vagina Monologues
2014	Los Locos Addams
2019	Casi Normales

== Discography ==
- 1995 – ¿O...fue un sueño?
- 1997 – Desde el baño
- 2002 – El pasado nos vuelve a pasar
- 2002 – Navidad
- 2004 – Quiero sentir bonito
- 2005 – Para darle cuerda al mundo
- 2006 – De la A a la Z
- 2007 – Te Busqué
- 2010 – Amarrados
- 2013 – La Sensatez Y La Cordura
- 2017 – Como La Sal
