= Sin remitente =

Sin Remitente
- Directed by: Carlos Carrera
- Written by: Carlos Carrera; Ignacio Ortiz; Silvia Pasternac
- Cinematography: Xavier Pérez Grobet
- Music by: Juan Cristóbal Pérez Grobet
- Release date: 1995
- Language: Spanish

Sin Remitente (also known as Return to Sender and Sender Unknown) is a 1995 Mexican drama film written and directed by Carlos Carrera. The film was entered into the main competition at the 52nd edition of the Venice Film Festival. It also won three Ariel Awards, for best picture, best direction and best actor.

== Cast ==
- Fernando Torre Laphame as Andrés
- Tiaré Scanda as Mariana
- Luisa Huertas as Teresita de Jesús
- Guillermo Gil as Mario
- Luis Felipe Tovar as Luis Felipe
- Gina Morett as Beti
- Nora Velázquez as Rosa, Mario's wife

== Accolades ==
=== Ariel Awards ===
The Ariel Awards are awarded annually by the Mexican Academy of Film Arts and Sciences in Mexico. Sin Remitente received four awards out of 14 nominations.

Year	Nominee / work	Award	Result
1996	Sin Remitente	Best Picture	Won
1996	Carlos Carrera	Best Direction	Won
1996	Fernando Torre Lapham	Best Actor	Won
1996	Guillermo Gil	Best Supporting Actor	Nominated
1996	Gina Morett	Best Supporting Actress	Nominated
1996	Luis Felipe Tovar	Best Actor in a Minor Role	Won
1996	Ignacio Ortíz Cruz and Silvia Pasternac	Best Original Screenplay	Nominated
1996	Juan Cristobal Pérez Grobet	Best Original Score	Nominated
1996	Xavier Pérez Grobet	Best Cinematography	Nominated
1996	Sigfrido Barjau	Best Editing	Nominated
1996	Gloria Carrasco	Best Production Design	Nominated
1996	Gloria Carrasco	Best Set Design	Nominated
1996	Nerio Barberis and Salvador de la Fuente	Best Sound	Nominated
1996	Alejandro Vázquez	Best Special Effects	Nominated
