= María Aura =

Mexican actress (born 1982)

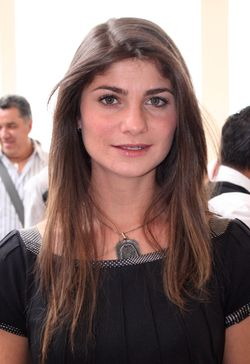
- Born: María Aura Boullosa; September 25, 1982 (age 43); Mexico City, Mexico
- Occupation: Actress
- Years active: 1985-present

María Aura (born María Aura Boullosa on September 25, 1982) is a Mexican actress.

== Early life ==
Aura was born on September 25, 1982, in Mexico City, Mexico.

== Filmography ==
=== Films ===
- 2001 Y tu mamá también as Cecilia Huerta
- 2001 A la otra
- 2002 Silk as Girl#1
- 2002 Aura
- 2004 Hotel Garage
- 2007 Niñas mal as Maribel
- 2007 Oblivion
- 2007 Volvo en un minuto
- 2008 Spam
- 2008 El garabato
- 2008 Conozca la cabeza de Juan Pérez as Contorsionista
- 2008 Llora as Veronica
- 2008 Arráncame la vida as Pepa
- 2009 Amar as Martha
- 2009 Igualdad as Patricia
- 2010 Las paredes hablan
- 2011 Pastorela as Reportera#1
- 2013 Me Late Chocolate
- 2024 Fine Young Men as Margarita

=== Theater ===
- 1985-1999 El Contrario Luzbel, dir. Alejandro Aura, Mexico
- 1990 La Sustancia, Character: Nicolasa, dir. Alejandra Díaz de Cossío, Mexico
- 1994 La Historia del Soldado, Character: El Soldado, dir. Alejandro Aura, Mexico
- 1999 Los Totoles, Character: Tules Totol, dir. Alejandro Aura, Mexico
- 2000 Kinder Cabarett, Hannover
- 2000 Los Hijos De Freud, dir. Jesusa Rodríguez, Mexico
- 2003 Las Criadas, Character: Claire, dir. Lisa Rothe, New York
- 2003 Agnes de Dios, Character: Agnes, dir. Lisa Rothe, New York
- 2008 El Contrario Luzbel, Character: Luzbel, dir. Pablo Aura, Mexico
- 2010 Todos eran mis hijos, dir. Francisco Franco
- 2014 Destino Manifiesto, dir. Veronica Falcón

=== Television ===
- 2003 El alma herida
- 2005 Los Plateados as Augusta Robledo
- 2008 Vivir por ti as Mariana de Landeros
- 2008 Tiempo final
- 2009 La noche boca arriba
- 2010 Los héroes del norte
- 2012 Los héroes del norte 2
- 2013 Los hèroes del norte 3
