= The Queen of the Night =

1994 film

- Directed by: Arturo Ripstein
- Written by: Paz Alicia Garciadiego
- Produced by: Jean-Michel Lacor
- Starring: Patricia Reyes Spíndola
- Cinematography: Bruno de Keyzer
- Edited by: Rafael Castanedo
- Release date: 7 September 1994
- Running time: 117 minutes
- Country: Mexico
- Language: Spanish

The Queen of the Night (Spanish: La reina de la noche) is a 1994 Mexican drama film directed by Arturo Ripstein. It was entered into the 1994 Cannes Film Festival.

== Cast ==
- Patricia Reyes Spíndola as Lucha Reyes
- Alberto Estrella as Pedro Calderón
- Blanca Guerra
- Ana Ofelia Murguía as Doña Victoria
- Alex Cox as Klaus Eder
- Arturo Alegro as Oñate
- Alejandra Montoya as Luzma
- Marta Aura as Balmori
- Roberto Sosa as Gimeno
- Juan Carlos Colombo as Araujo
- Guillermo Gil as Gato Linares
- María Marcucci
- Maya Mishalska

== Awards ==
=== Ariel Awards ===
The Ariel Awards are awarded annually by the Mexican Academy of Film Arts and Sciences in Mexico. La reina de la noche received six awards out of 12 nominations.

Year	Nominee / work	Award	Result
1996	La reina de la noche	Best Picture	Nominated
1996	Patricia Reyes Spíndola	Best Actress	Won
1996	Ana Ofelia Murguía	Best Supporting Actress	Won
1996	Arturo Alegro	Best Actor in a Minor Role	Nominated
1996	Paz Alicia Garciadiego	Best Original Story	Nominated
1996	Paz Alicia Garciadiego	Best Screenplay	Nominated
1996	Paz Alicia Garciadiego	Best Original Music Theme or Song	Won
1996	Lucía Álvarez	Best Original Music Theme or Song	Won
1996	Rafael Castanedo	Best Editing	Nominated
1996	José Luis Aguilar	Best Production Design	Won
1996	Ángeles Martínez and Eduardo Corona	Best Set Design	Won
1996	Graciela Mazón	Best Costume Design	Won
