= Sabina Berman =

Mexican poet, playwright and film director

- Berman in 2013
- Born: Sabina Berman Goldberg; August 21, 1955 (age 71); Mexico City, Mexico
- Education: Universidad Iberoamericana
- Occupations: Writer; novelist; screenplayer
- Relatives: Shanik Berman (sister-in-law)

Sabina Berman Goldberg (born August 21, 1955) is a Mexican writer and journalist. Her work deals mainly with issues related to diversity and its obstacles. She is a four-time winner of the National Playwriting Award in Mexico (Premio Nacional de Dramaturgia Juan Ruiz Alarcón) and has twice won the National Journalism Award (Premio Nacional de Periodismo). Her plays have been staged in North America, South America, and Europe. Her novel, Me (La mujer que buceó en el corazón del mundo) has been translated into 11 languages and published in over 33 countries, including Spain, France, the United States, England, and Israel.

As a screenwriter, Berman is known for writing the screenplays of the films Between Pancho Villa and a Naked Woman (1996), Backyard (2009) and Gloria (2014), Macho (2016) and Digger (2026). Between Pancho Villa and a Naked Woman, Backyard and Gloria were the Mexican nomination for the Academy Awards's Best Foreign Film category, though neither was accepted for consideration at the 69th, 82nd or the 87th Academy Awards, respectively.

== Biography ==
The start of Berman's life was marked by the emigration to Mexico of her parents, who were Polish Jews, under the presidential administration of Lázaro Cárdenas del Río. Her father, the industrialist Enrique Berman, lost all of his family members to World War II. Her mother is the psychoanalyst Raquel Goldberg. Berman was born in the Hospital Español of Mexico City, where she was raised together with two brothers and one sister. She was a member of Mexico's national youth tennis team. She studied psychology and Mexican literature at the Universidad Iberoamericana.

== Career ==
In 1979, she coauthored La tía Alejandra, a horror film directed by Arturo Ripstein. Her screenplay was awarded a Premio Ariel. In 1995, she co-directed the film Entre Pancho Villa y una mujer desnuda together with Isabel Tardan. She also wrote and co-produced the film Backyard, which represented Mexico in the 2010 Academy Awards.

In 2014, she wrote the film Gloria, a biopic of Mexican singer Gloria Trevi, directed by Christian Keller that was a Premio Ariel nominee for best original screenplay. In 2015, she wrote Macho, directed by Antonio Serrano.

She authored the screenplays for the films The History of Love for Alfonso Cuarón and Light for Alejandro González Iñarritu.

Her novel, Me (La mujer que buceó en el corazón del mundo) has been translated into 11 languages and published in over 33 countries, including Spain, France, the United States, England, and Israel. Her most recent book, Darwin's God, revisits the protagonist of Me to engage in a struggle for Darwin's legacy.

She was co-producer of the television program Shalalá together with Katia D'Artigues, broadcast on Televisión Azteca. She currently hosts the program Berman: Otras Historias on ADN40.

As a journalist, she is a bi-weekly contributor to Revista Proceso and a weekly columnist for El Universal, where she publishes political fables. She has written articles for Vanity Fair magazine in Spanish and for the magazine Quién.

== List of works ==
- Digger, screenwriter (2026)
- Macho, screenwriter (2016)
- Gloria, screenwriter (2014)
- El dios de Darwin [Darwin's God] (2014)
- La mujer que buceó dentro del corazón del mundo [Me] (2010)
- Backyard, screenwriter (2009)
- Feliz nuevo siglo doktor Freud [Freud skating] (2002)
- Molière [Molière] (2000)
- Mujeres y poder, cowritten with Denise Maerker [Women and power] (2000)
- La bobe [The grandmother] (1997)
- Amante de lo ajeno (1997)
- Between Pancho Villa and a Naked Woman, screenwriter (1996)
- Berman (1995)
- Un grano de arroz [A grain of rice] (1995)
- Volar [Fly] (1993)
- En el nombre de Dios [In the name of God], work published in the magazine Tramoya (1993)
- Articles and short stories for the weekly culture section of the newspaper La Jornada (1992)
- La grieta [The crack], a play published in the magazine Tramoya (1992)
- Lunas [Moons], prose poetry, (1989)
- Muerte súbita [Sudden death], theater, (1989)
- La maravillosa historia de Chiquito Pingüica [The wonderful story of Chiquito Pingüica], in the anthology The Noah's Ark [El arca de Noé] by Emilio Carballido (1984)
- Rompecabezas [Puzzle] (1982)
- La tía Alejandra, screenwriter (1979)

== Awards and Recognitions ==
- 2009 Backyard (Traspatio). Toronto International Film Festival Silver Medal. Best Screenplay, Festival de Ibiza. Independent Spirit Award. Selected by the Havana Film Festival for Best Film Editing and Best Screenplay
- 2008 Premio Nacional de Dramaturgia Juan Ruiz de Alarcón
- 2007 National Journalism Award for the article “Las tribulaciones de la fe.”
- 2002 Premio Juan Ruiz de Alarcón for Best Work by a Mexican Playwright for Feliz nuevo siglo doktor Freud
- 2001 Best dramaturgy prizes from BRAVO and the Asociación de Cronistas y Periodistas de Teatro for Feliz nuevo siglo doktor Freud, as well as the Premio Nacional de Dramaturgia Juan Ruiz Alarcón
- 2000 Premio Nacional de Periodismo for her series on Women and Power. (Directed by Isabelle Tardan; screenplay by Sabina Berman; interviews by Denise Maerker.) Premio Nacional María Lavalle Urbina for the excellence of her work in the Arts
- 1999 Premio Rodolfo Usigli for playwright of the year, Premio Nacional de Dramaturgia Juan Ruiz Alarcón, and Premio Banquels for her play Molière, which also received three prizes from the Asociación de Críticos (Play of the Year, Best Playwright, Best Music)
- 1998 Premio Rodolfo Usigli for Best Playwright of the Year for La Grieta
- 1996 Entre villa y una mujer desnuda. Best film, Cinemafest, Puerto Rico. Named Mexico's representative to the Academy Awards. El árbol de la música. Named Mexico's short film representative to the Academy Awards.
- 1995 Entre villa y una mujer desnuda. Chicago International Film Festival Prize.
- 1994 Entre villa y una mujer desnuda. Premio HERALDO, Best Play of the Year. Prize from the Asociación de Críticos for Best Play. Six prizes from the Asociación de Críticos for Best Direction, Best Actress, Best Actor, Best Supporting Actor, Best Supporting Actress
- 1991 Los ladrones del tiempo. Prize from the Asociación de Críticos for Best Play in Children's Theater
- 1988 Águila o sol. Premio del Festival Internacional de Teatro Amateur (in Quebec), staging by the BOCANA company
- 1986 El árbol de humo. Premio Celestino Goroztiza (for children's theater)
- 1983 En el nombre de dios (previously Anatema or HEREJÍA). Premio Nacional de Obras de Teatro
- 1982 La maravillosa historia de chiquito pinguica. Premio Nacional de Teatro para Niños (awarded by the Instituto Nacional de Bellas Artes)
- 1981 Rompecabezas. Premio Nacional de Obras de Teatro (awarded by the Instituto Nacional de Bellas Artes)
- 1979 Bill. Premio Nacional de Obras de Teatro (awarded by the Instituto Nacional de Bellas Artes)
- La tía Alejandra. Premio Ariel from the Academia de Artes Cinematográficas for Best Screenplay. Directed by Arturo Ripstein
