= Antonio Serrano (director) =

Mexican film director, actor, playwright and screenwriter

José Antonio Serrano Argüelles (born 17 May 1955, in Mexico City) is a Mexican film director, actor, playwright and screenwriter. He graduated with a degree in Communications from the Universidad Iberoamericana. He also attended the Royal Weber Academy of Dramatic Art in England and the Odin Teater of Denmark. He studied with the following directors: Polish Jerzy Grotowski, French Philippe Gaulier and Italian Carlos Bosso. Back in Mexico he worked in the telenovela (soap opera) industry for Televisa and TV Azteca, directing actors such as Gael García Bernal, Salma Hayek, Chayanne and Angélica Aragón.

He directed ten plays as well including Sexo, pudor y lágrimas, which he also wrote. He made this play into a film in 1999 which became the highest grossing at the time (Mex$118,000,000, or 12 million US dollars at the exchange rate of 1999). The movie was seen exhibited for six months by millions and earned several Ariels awarded by the Mexican Academy of Film. His following films were Lucia, Lucia with All About My Mother Argentine actress Cecilia Roth and the segment El Torzón of the series of short-films about violence in Mexico City titled Cero y van cuatro. Serrano was nominated for the Ariel Award in 2004 for his adaptation of the script of Lucía, Lucía.

== Telenovelas (as a director) ==
- Cara o cruz (2002)
- La vida en el espejo (1999)
- Mirada de mujer (1997)
- Nada personal (1996)
- Mágica juventud (1992)
- Teresa (1989)

== Theater ==
- Café americano (1992)
- Sexo, pudor y lágrimas (1990)
- Doble cara (1988)
- A destiempo (1986)

== Films ==
=== As a director ===
- Sexo, pudor y lágrimas (Sex, Shame & Tears) (1999)
- La hija del canibal (Lucía, Lucía) (2003)
- Cero y van cuatro (segment "El Torzón") (2004)
- Hidalgo: La historia jamás contada (2010)
- Morelos (2012)
- Macho (2016)

=== As a screenwriter ===
- La hija del canibal (Lucía, Lucía) (2003, adaptation)
- Sexo, pudor y lágrimas (Sex, Shame & Tears) (1999, original; script)

=== As an actor ===
- Un mundo maravilloso (2006)
- Un hilito de sangre (1995)
- La dedicatoria (1992)
- The Comfort of Strangers (1990)
- La última luna (1990)
- Romero (1989)
- Tranquille donne di compagna (1980)
