= Blanca Guerra =

Mexican actress (born 1953)

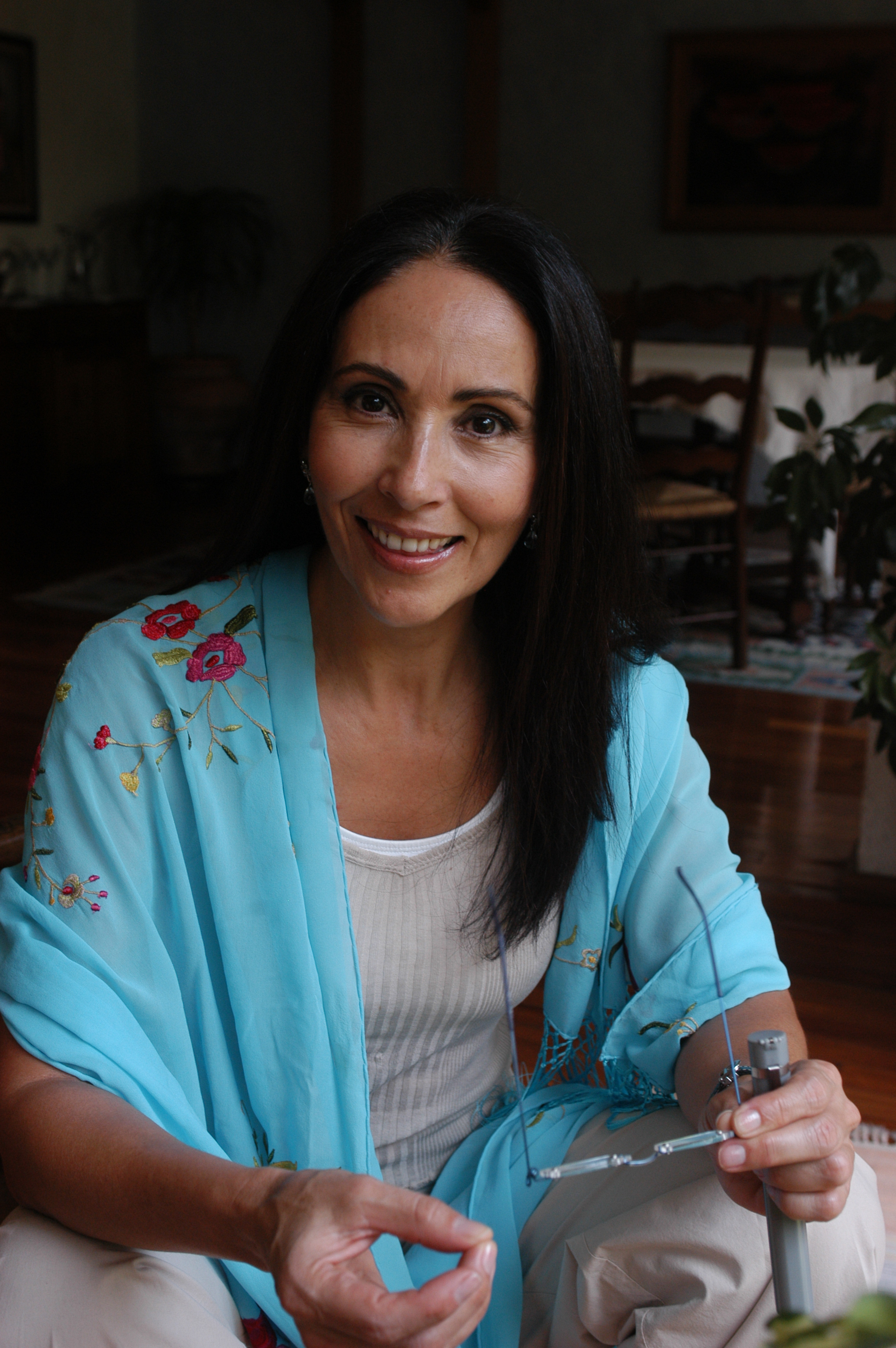
- Born: Blanca Guerra Islas; January 10, 1953 (age 73); Mexico City, Mexico
- Occupation: Actress
- Years active: 1978–present
- Children: Emiliano Guerra

Blanca Guerra Islas (born January 10, 1953) is a Mexican actress. In 1983 she was a member of the jury at the 13th Moscow International Film Festival.

== Films ==
- La loca de los milagros (1975)
- Pedro Páramo (1978) - Dolores Preciado
- El servicio (1978)
- Complot mongol (1978) - Martita
- En la trampa (1979) - Isabel Salas
- Adiós David (1979)
- Estas ruinas que ves (1979)
- El coyote y La Bronca (1980) - Maria Trinidad "La Bronca"
- Mírame con ojos pornográficos (1980) - Sra. Gayosso
- Te solté la rienda (1980)
- Perro callejero (1980)
- Como México no hay dos (1981)
- La cripta (1981) - Mercedes
- Las siete cucas (1981)
- El mojado remojado (1981) - Xochitl
- Perro callejero II (1981) - La chiquis
- Campanas rojas (1982)
- Juan Charrasqueado y Gabino Barrera, su verdadera historia (1982)
- Valentin Lazaña (1982)
- Aquel famoso Remington (1982)
- El tesoro de la muerte sagrada (1982)
- Oro blanco, droga maldita (1982) - Amalia
- El caballito volador (1982)
- Burdel (1982)
- Eréndina (1983)
- Dos de abajo (1983)
- Una pura y dos con sal (1983)
- La fuga de Carrasco (1983)
- Spicy Chile (1983)
- El vengador del 30-06 (1983)
- Sin vergüenza (1984)
- Motel (1984) - Martha Camargo
- Mamá, soy Paquito (1984) - Susana Gomez
- Nocaut (1984) - Lilia Montero
- El billetero (1984)
- La Segua (1985) - Petronila Quesada
- Sin vergüenza pero honrado (1985)
- La revancha (1985)
- El beso de las brujas (1985)
- Orinoco (1986) - Fifi
- El Cafre (1986)
- Separate Vacations (1986) - Alicia the Working Girl
- ¿Como vez? (1986) - Fish Vendor
- El imperio de la fortuna (1986) - La caponera
- El juego de la muerte (1986)
- Conexión criminal (1987)
- Persecución en las Vegas: "Volveré" (1987) - Olga
- La pandilla infernal (1987) - Yolanda
- Zapata en Chinameca (1987)
- Walker (una historia verdadera) (1987) - Yrena
- Días difíciles (1987) - Luisa Castelar
- Cacería impecable (1988)
- Santa Sangre (1989) - Concha
- Cabalgando de la muerte (1989) - Josefina
- Sandino (1990) - Rossana
- Morir en el golfo (1990) - Leonora
- Ciudad de ciegos (1991) - Ines
- Danzón (1991) - Colorada
- Sonata de luna (1992)
- Mantis religiosa (1992)
- Secuestro a mano armada (1992)
- Principio y fin (1993) - Julia
- Kino: la leyenda del padre negro (1993) - Cortesana 1
- En medio de la nada (1993)
- Peligro imminente (1994)
- La reina de la noche (1994) - La Jaira
- Salón México (1996) - Almendrita
- Sabor latino (1996) - Norma
- Violeta (1997)
- Un embrujo (1998) - Felipa
- En un claroscuro de la luna (1999) - Maruca
- Su alteza Serenísima (2000)
- Mientras me muero (2003)
- Niñas mal (2007) - Macarena "Maca" Ribera
- La zona (2007) - Lucia
- Morirse está en hebreo (2007) - Julia Palafox
- Kada kien su karma (2008) - Eva
- Cosas insignificantes (2008) - Mara
- Bajo la sal (2008) - Guadalupe Calva
- Venganza en el Valle de las Muñecas (2009)
- ¿Cómo matar a mamá? (2023) - Rosalinda
- Where the Tracks End (2023) - Ethereal Mage

== Televisión ==
Year	Title	Character	Note
2025	Amanecer	Covadonga de los Reyes	
2024	Marea de pasiones	María Inés	
2022	La rebelión	Monica's mother	
2019–2020	Los pecados de Bárbara	Matilde Robledo de Godinez	Main role
2016–2017	Tres veces Ana	Soledad Hernández	Main role
2012	Abismo de pasión	Alfonsina Mondragon de Arango	Main role
2011	Para volver a amar	Maestra de ceremonias	Guest role
2008-09	Alma de hierro	Elena Jiménez de Hierro	Lead role
2004	Amarte es mi pecado	Leonora Madrigal de Horta	Supporting role
2003	Velo de novia	Ricarda del Álamo	Supporting role
2000	La casa en la playa	Marina Villarreal	Main role
1998	La mentira	Miranda Montesinos	Supporting role
1997	Mujer, casos de la vida real		TV series
1995	Si Dios me quita la vida	Virginia Hernández	Supporting role
1993	Valentina	Debora Andrade	Main role
1991-92	Al filo de la muerte	Alina	Main role
1988-89	Nuevo amanecer	Norma	Main role
1985	Juana Iris	Magali	Main role
1982	Lo que el cielo no perdona	Isabel	Lead role
1980	Corazones sin rumbo	Magda	Lead role
1979	Yara	Regina	Supporting role
1978	Una mujer	Mabel	Supporting role
