= Un embrujo =

1998 film

- Directed by: Carlos Carrera
- Written by: Carlos Carrera; Martín Salinas
- Produced by: Guillermo del Toro
- Starring: Blanca Guerra
- Distributed by: NuVision (through 20th Century Fox)
- Release date: 15 September 1998 (TIFF)
- Running time: 130 minutes
- Country: Mexico
- Language: Spanish

Un embrujo ([un emˈbɾuxo], "A Magic Spell," sometimes translated as Under a Spell) is a 1998 Mexican drama film directed by Carlos Carrera. The film was selected as the Mexican entry for the Best Foreign Language Film at the 71st Academy Awards, but was not accepted as a nominee.

== Cast ==
- Blanca Guerra as Felipa
- Mario Zaragoza as Eliseo (adult)
- Daniel Acuña as Eliseo (Young)
- Luis Fernando Peña as Burro
- Ricardo Rentería as Rafael (Young)
- Luisa Huertas as María
- Vanessa Bauche as Magda
- Elpidia Carrillo as Esposa del Brujo

== See also ==
- List of submissions to the 71st Academy Awards for Best Foreign Language Film
- List of Mexican submissions for the Academy Award for Best Foreign Language Film
