= Zaide Silvia Gutiérrez =

Mexican actress (born 1958)

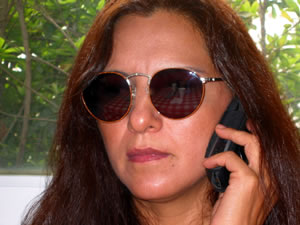
- Gutiérrez in 2004
- Born: November 2, 1958 (age 67); Mexico City, Mexico
- Spouse: Richard McDowell

Zaide Silvia Gutiérrez (born November 2, 1958) is a Mexican actress whose breakout role was the 1983 film El Norte.

Gutiérrez attended the National Autonomous University of Mexico, and graduated with a Bachelor of Arts, with highest honors, in Dramatic Literature and Theater. Her graduate work includes Theater Directing (Columbia University), Russian Literature, and Mexican Literature (National Autonomous University of Mexico). She graduated with a double major in Mexican Literature and Film Direction at Columbia University.

Since her debut in La Lucha Con La Pantera Zaide appeared in over 35 feature films in Mexico.

She has appeared in two films by director Alex Cox, El Patrullero in 1991 and Death and the Compass in 1996. She also received a nomination for the Ariel Award for Best Supporting Actress for Por Si No Te Vuelvo a Ver in 1998.

In addition, she has appeared in many telenovelas, and she both acts in and directs theatre.

Gutiérrez appeared in Gregory Nava's Bordertown in 2007.

== Filmography ==
Film roles
Year	Title	Roles	Notes
1975	La lucha con la pantera	Patricia's friend	
1978	Rarotonga	Tuituila	
1983	El Norte	Rosa	
1985	Viaje al paraíso	Carola	
1986	Miracles	K'in's Wife	
1986	Firewalker	Indian Girl	
1986	El imperio de la fortuna	La Pinzona	
1987	Hotel Colonial	Linda	
1987	Gaby: A True Story	Hospital Nurse	
1991	Ciudad de ciegos	Teo	
1991	El Patrullero	Griselda	
1992	Wild Blue Moon	Luz	
1992	Cita en el paraíso	Alejandra	Short film
1996	Entre Pancho Villa y una mujer desnuda	Unknown role	
1996	Sobrenatural	Eva María Herrera	
1997	Por si no te vuelvo a ver	Silvia	
1998	El evangelio de las maravillas	Unknown role	
1998	La otra conquista	Beata Conversa	
2000	En el país de no pasa nada	Luisa	
2002	Ciudades oscuras	Zezé	
2002	Amar te duele	Claudia	
2003	Zurdo	Maestra	
2004	El mago	Madre	
2006	Ciudad al límite	Lourdes Jiménez	
2007	Niñas mal	Fina	
2007	Espérame en otro mundo	Dra. Luengo	
2008	Soy mi madre	Sable Sainte	Short film
2009	Cabeza de buda	Reportera	
2010	Juventud	Miss Berenice	
2010	Hell	Señora Buitre	
2012	La vida precoz y breve de Sabina Rivas	Madre de Sabina y Jovany	

Television roles
Year	Title	Roles	Notes
1988	Angélica, mi vida	unknown role	
1990	Días sin luna	Irene	
1992	Cuentos de Borges	Ms.Espinoza / Harlequin	Episode: "Death and the Compass"
1993	Valentina	Rafaela	
1996	La culpa	Nemoría	
1996–2006	Mujer, casos de la vida real	Various roles	24 episodes
1997	Pueblo chico, infierno grande	Olinca	
1998	Una luz en el camino	Eloída	
2001	El derecho de nacer	La Loba	
2001	In the Time of the Butterflies	Mother Superior	Television film
2002	¡Vivan los niños!	Estela Castillo	
2004	Misión S.O.S	Lupe Espinos	
2004–2005	Apuesta por un amor	Doctora	3 episodes
2006	Duelo de pasiones	Vera	
2007	XHDRbZ	Esposa Desesperada	Episode: "Sueño de telenovela"
2008	La rosa de Guadalupe	Lucha	Episode: "Salida de emergencia"
2010–2011	Para volver a amar	Rosaura Pereyra	146 episodes
2011–2017	Como dice el dicho	Various roles	5 episodes
2012	Un refugio para el amor	Paz Jacinto	159 episodes
2013–2014	Qué pobres tan ricos	Carmelita	167 episodes
2015	Que te perdone Dios	Simona	84 episodes
2015–2016	Simplemente María	Zenaida	9 episodes
2016	Por siempre Joan Sebastian	Amanda Figueroa	12 episodes
2017	La doble vida de Estela Carrillo	Chayo	67 episodes
2018	Por amar sin ley	Sylvia	4 episodes
2018	La jefa del campeón	Sara	
2021	Madre sólo hay dos	Lucía	
2026	Hermanas, un amor compartido	Concepción "Chonchita" Bringas de Correa	

== Awards ==
- Ariel Award: Nominated for four awards in Mexican films
- Mexican Cinema Journalists Award: Won two awards in Mexican films
- The Association of Latin Entertainment Critics: Won one award
