= All of Them Witches =

- Spanish: Sobrenatural
- Directed by: Daniel Gruener
- Screenplay by: Gabriel González Meléndez
- Story by: Gabriel González Meléndez; Daniel Gruener
- Produced by: Dulce Kuri; Ivan Lipkies
- Starring: Susana Zabaleta; Alejandro Tommasi; Ricardo Blume; Delia Casanova; Roberto Cobo; Zaide Silvia Gutiérrez
- Cinematography: Rodrigo Prieto
- Edited by: Jorge Aguilera
- Music by: Gabriel González Meléndez
- Production company: Televicine
- Distributed by: Televicine
- Release date: October 18, 1996 (Mexico)
- Running time: 100 minutes
- Country: Mexico
- Language: Spanish

All of them Witches (Sobrenatural) is a 1996 Mexican supernatural horror film by director Daniel Gruener. Based on a screenplay by Gabriel González Meléndez, it features Susana Zabaleta, Ricardo Blume, Alejandro Tommasi, and Delia Casanova. The name of this movie matches that of a book of witchcraft that appeared in the 1968 film Rosemary's Baby, based on the book by Ira Levin.

== Plot ==
After Dolores (Zabaleta) hears a neighbor being killed, her husband Andres (Tommasi) tries to dispel her fears about gang activity in their apartment building. After he falls asleep, however, she overhears her husband muttering the murdered neighbor's name. Another neighbor, the witch-like Madame Endor (Casanova) warns Dolores that she is in danger and her concerns are then confirmed by her psychiatrist. Dolores begins to believe that disturbing events happening around are the work of the devil.

== Cast ==
- Susana Zabaleta as Dolores Berthier
- Alejandro Tommasi as Andrés Berthier
- Ricardo Blume as Dr. Riojas
- Delia Casanova as Madame Endor
- Francis Laboriel as Zombie
- Roberto Cobo as Ferretero
- Zaide Silvia Gutiérrez as Eva María Herrera

== Reception ==
In 1996, the film, which is entirely in Spanish, was a winner of Prieto Mexico's Ariel and Diosa de Plata Awards. The following year, it won the Colombia Film Festival Award for best cinematography. Rotten Tomatoes has given this film a 56% on the Popcornmeter.
