= Sexo, pudor y lágrimas =

1999 film by Antonio Serrano

Sex, Shame, and Tears
- Promotional poster for Sexo, pudor y lágrimas
- Directed by: Antonio Serrano
- Written by: Antonio Serrano
- Produced by: Matthias Ehrenberg; Christian Valdelièvre
- Starring: Demián Bichir; Susana Zabaleta; Jorge Salinas; Cecilia Suárez; Víctor Huggo Martin; Mónica Dionne
- Music by: Aleks Syntek
- Production companies: Titán Producciones; Argos Cine; Tabasco Films; IMCINE
- Distributed by: 20th Century Fox
- Release dates: June 18, 1999 (Mexico); October 1, 1999 (United States)
- Running time: 109 minutes
- Country: Mexico
- Language: Spanish
- Box office: MX$118 million

Sexo, pudor y lágrimas (Sex, Shame, and Tears) is a 1999 Mexican romantic comedy drama film written and directed by Antonio Serrano and starring Demián Bichir, Susana Zabaleta, Jorge Salinas, Cecilia Suárez, Víctor Huggo Martin and Mónica Dionne. The film is based on Serrano's stage play Sexo, pudor y lágrimas, which ran for two years. The film broke box-office records in Mexico, grossing MX$118 million (roughly US$11 million). It played for six months, and was seen by more than eight million people in Mexico alone, and won five Ariel Awards.

== Plot ==
Tomás returns to Mexico after a seven-year trip around the world, to visit his friends Carlos and Ana, a couple going through relationship problems. Ana is seduced by Tomás, who is also her ex-boyfriend, which causes Carlos to kick Tomás out of their home. Although instead of Tomás leaving, Ana leaves and moves across the street to the apartment of their friends Miguel and Andrea, another couple going through problems. The situation becomes a battle of the sexes when Miguel is kicked-out for cheating on Andrea and sent to live with the "guys" across the street and María, their friend, joins the "girls" in a boycott against all men. Tomas then has a fling with Andrea and gets caught in the act. After seeing the emptiness of his life, punctuated with him making a scene at a local nightclub, Tomas declares his love for Ana before apparently committing suicide by walking into an elevator shaft.

=== Alternate endings ===
In the Region 4 DVD version, several alternate final scenes are explored, including Tomas surviving the fall and emerging in a full body cast.

== Cast ==
- Demián Bichir as Tomás
- Susana Zabaleta as Ana
- Jorge Salinas as Miguel
- Cecilia Suárez as Andrea
- Víctor Huggo Martin as Carlos
- Mónica Dionne as María

== Sequel ==
The sequel, Sexo, pudor y lágrimas 2 was released on February 4, 2022, on HBO Max. All the cast from the first film reprise their roles except for Demián Bichir, who appears in photographs and flashbacks.

== Awards ==
- 42nd Ariel Awards from the Mexican Academy of Film Arts and Sciences:
  - Best actress: Susana Zabaleta
  - Art direction: Brigitte Broch
  - Best original score
  - Best original script
  - Best setting
- XIV Guadalajara Film Festival
  - Audience Award
