= Between Pancho Villa and a Naked Woman =

1996 film

- Directed by: Sabina Berman; Isabelle Tardán
- Written by: Sabina Berman
- Starring: Diana Bracho
- Release date: 11 April 1996
- Running time: 87 minutes
- Country: Mexico
- Language: Spanish

Between Pancho Villa and a Naked Woman (Spanish: Entre Pancho Villa y una mujer desnuda) is a 1996 Mexican comedy film directed by Sabina Berman and Isabelle Tardán. The film was selected as the Mexican entry for the Best Foreign Language Film at the 69th Academy Awards, but was not accepted as a nominee.

== Cast ==
- Diana Bracho as Gina López
- Arturo Ríos as Adrián Pineda
- Jesús Ochoa as Pancho Villa

== See also ==
- List of submissions to the 69th Academy Awards for Best Foreign Language Film
- List of Mexican submissions for the Academy Award for Best Foreign Language Film
