= Ariel Award for Best Actress =

Ariel Award category

- Awarded for: Best Performance by an Actress in a Leading Role
- Country: Mexico
- Presented by: AMACC
- First award: 1947
- Currently held by: Diana Sedano, Juana (2026)
- Website: premioariel.com.mx

The Ariel Award for Best Actress (Spanish: Premio Ariel a Mejor Actriz) is an award presented by the Academia Mexicana de Artes y Ciencias Cinematográficas (AMACC) in Mexico. It is given in honor of an actress who has delivered an outstanding performance in a leading role while working within the Mexican film industry. In 1947, the 1st and 2nd Ariel Awards were held, with Dolores del Río and María Félix winning for the films Las Abandonadas and Enamorada, respectively. With the exception of the years 1959 to 1971, when the Ariel Awards were suspended, the award has been given annually. Nominees and winners are determined by a committee formed every year consisting of academy members (active and honorary), previous winners and individuals with at least two Ariel nominations; the committee members submit their votes through the official AMACC website.

Since its inception, the award has been given to 57 actresses. Blanca Guerra is the most awarded performer, with four accolades; Del Río, Félix, and María Rojo had received three Ariels, each; while Irene Azuela, Mónica del Carmen, Marga López, Silvia Pinal, Patricia Reyes Spíndola and Adriana Roel, had been awarded twice. Rojo is the most nominated performer, with eight nominations. The category has resulted in a tie on four occasions: Guerra and Norma Herrera (1980), Guerra and Rojo (1988), Ximena Ayala and Ana Bertha Espín (2001), and Elizabeth Cervantes and Maribel Verdú (2007). In two instances an actress has been nominated twice the same year: in 1983, Rojo was nominated for La Pachanga and La Víspera, and lost the award to Beatriz Sheridan for Confidencias; and at the 38th Ariel Awards, Patricia Reyes Spíndola was nominated twice in the category for La Reina de la Noche and Mujeres Insumisas, and won for the former film. In 1984, Isela Vega won for La Viuda Negra, filmed in 1977 and censored seven years because of its content.

Ten films have featured two nominated performances for Best Actress, the episode "Nosotros" from the anthology film Tú, Yo, Nosotros (Julissa and Rita Macedo), De Todos Modos Juan Te Llamas (Patricia Aspillaga and Rocío Brambila), Naufragio (Ana Ofelia Murguía and María Rojo), Veneno Para Las Hadas (Elsa María Gutiérrez and Ana Patricia Rojo), Como Agua Para Chocolate (Lumi Cavazos and Regina Torné), Principio y Fin (Julieta Egurrola and Lucía Muñoz), Novia Que Te Vea (Claudette Maillé and Maya Mishalska), El Callejón de los Milagros (Salma Hayek and Margarita Sanz), Nicotina (Rosa María Bianchi and Carmen Madrid), and Familia (Cassandra Ciangherotti and Ilse Salas); Macedo, Brambila, Rojo, Torné, Muñoz, Sanz and Bianchi won the award. 14 performers have won both the Ariel Award for Best Actress and the accolade for Best Supporting Actress; Margarita Sanz and Patricia Reyes Spíndola had received the aforementioned awards and the Ariel for Best Actress in a Minor Role. Ana Ofelia Murguía is the most nominated actress without a win, with five unsuccessful nominations. As of the 2026 ceremony, Diana Sedano is the most recent winner in this category for her role in Juana.

== Winners and nominees ==
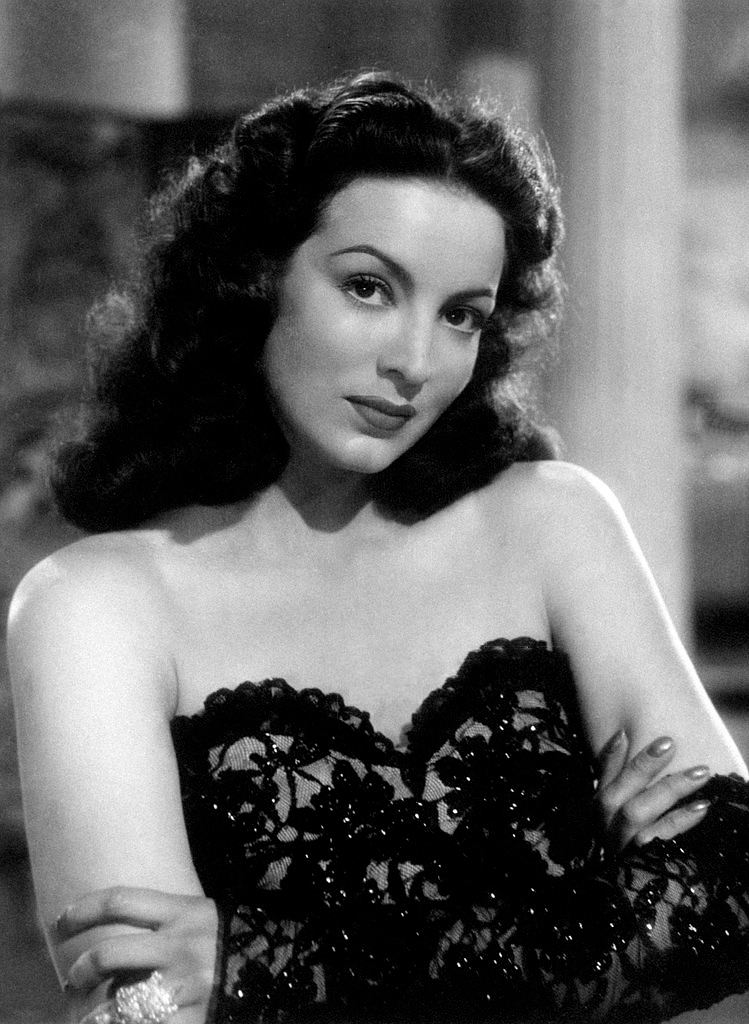
María Félix won the award three times for Enamorada (1947), Río Escondido (1949) and Doña Diabla (1951).

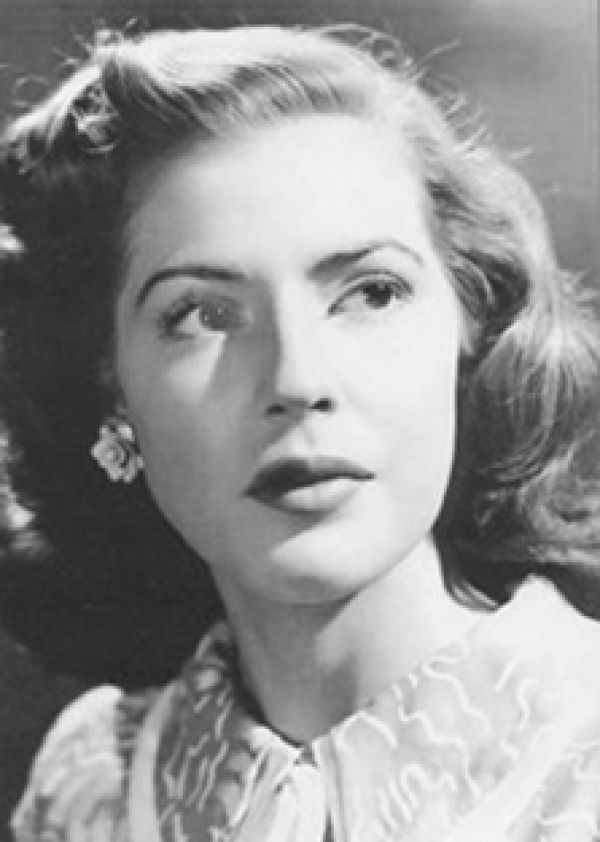
Blanca Estela Pavón was nominated twice and won for Cuando Lloran los Valientes (1948).

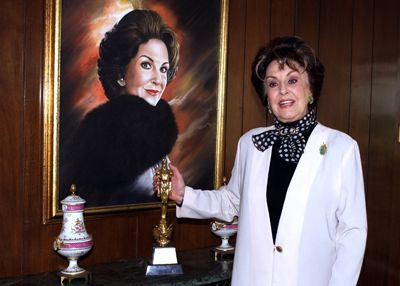
Marga López was nominated seven times winning twice for Salón México (1950) and La Entrega (1955).

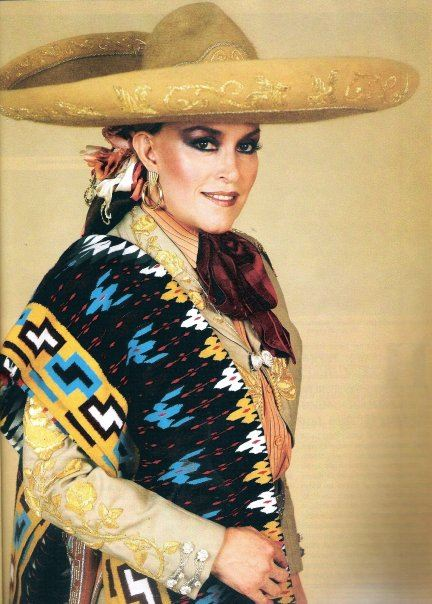
Lucha Villa was nominated twice and won for Mecánica Nacional (1973).

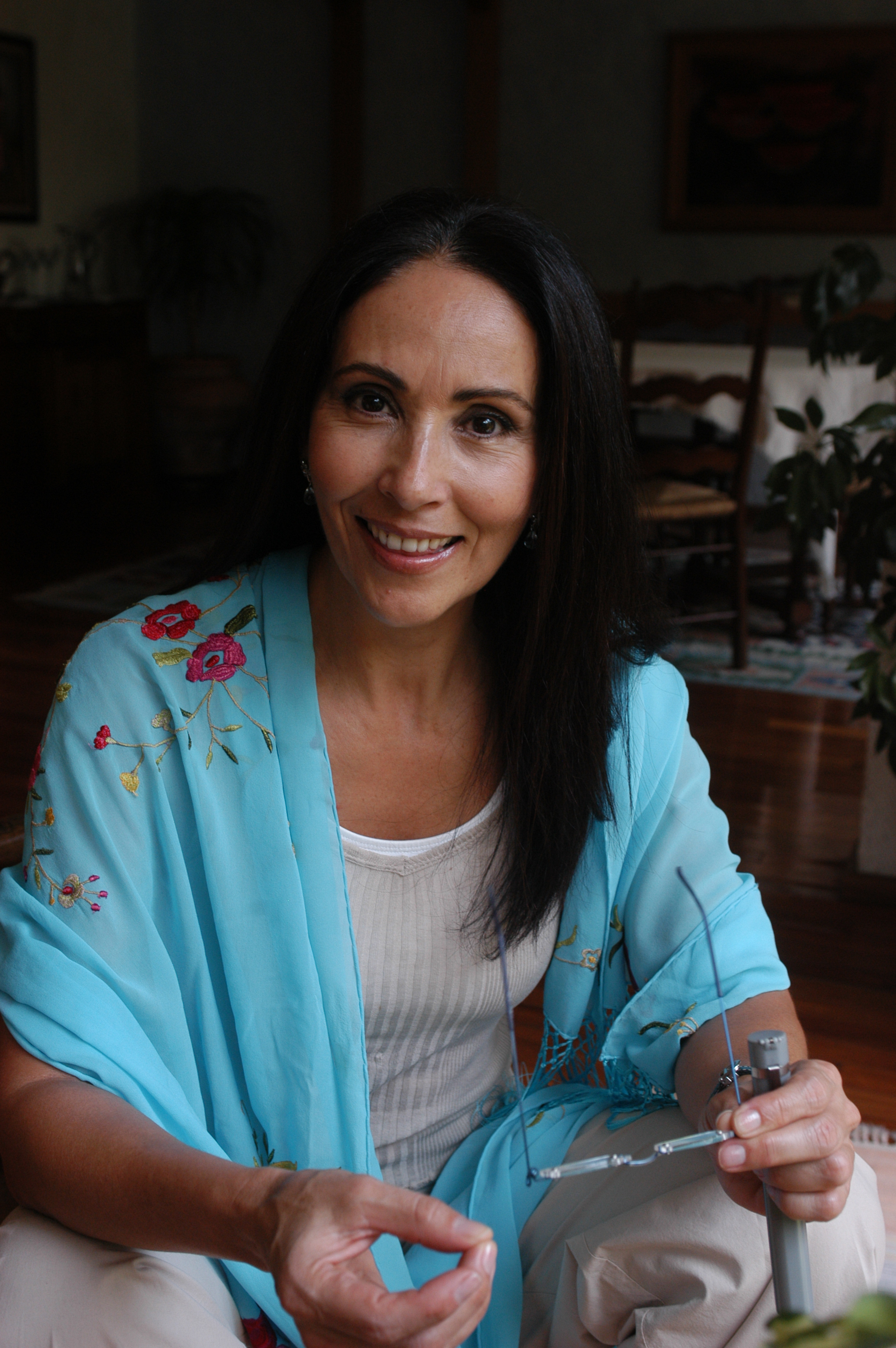
Blanca Guerra is the most awarded actress, with four accolades, for Perro Callejero (1980), El Imperio de la Fortuna (1987), Días Difíciles (1988), and Un Embrujo (1999).

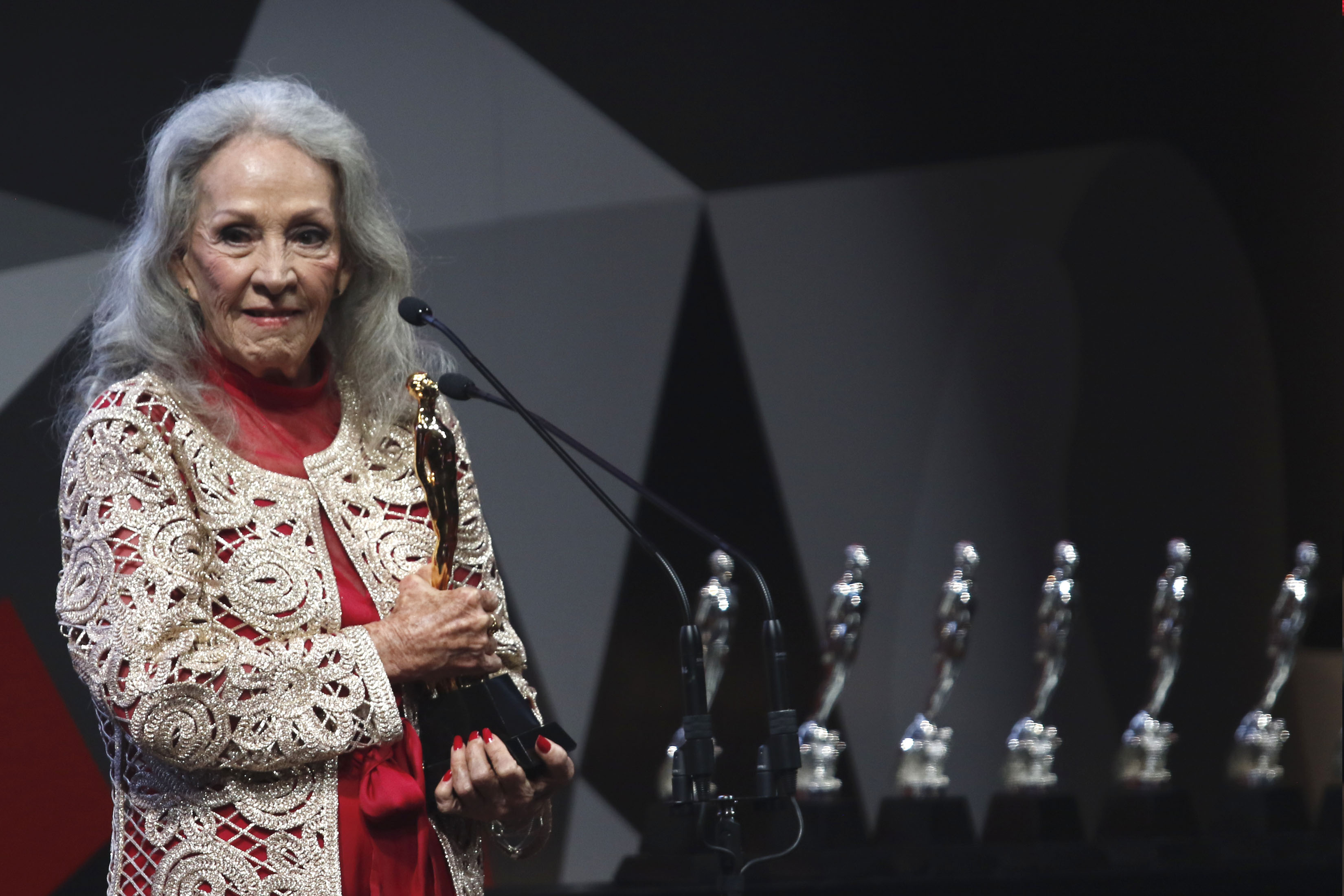
Isela Vega was nominated three times and won for La Viuda Negra in 1984.

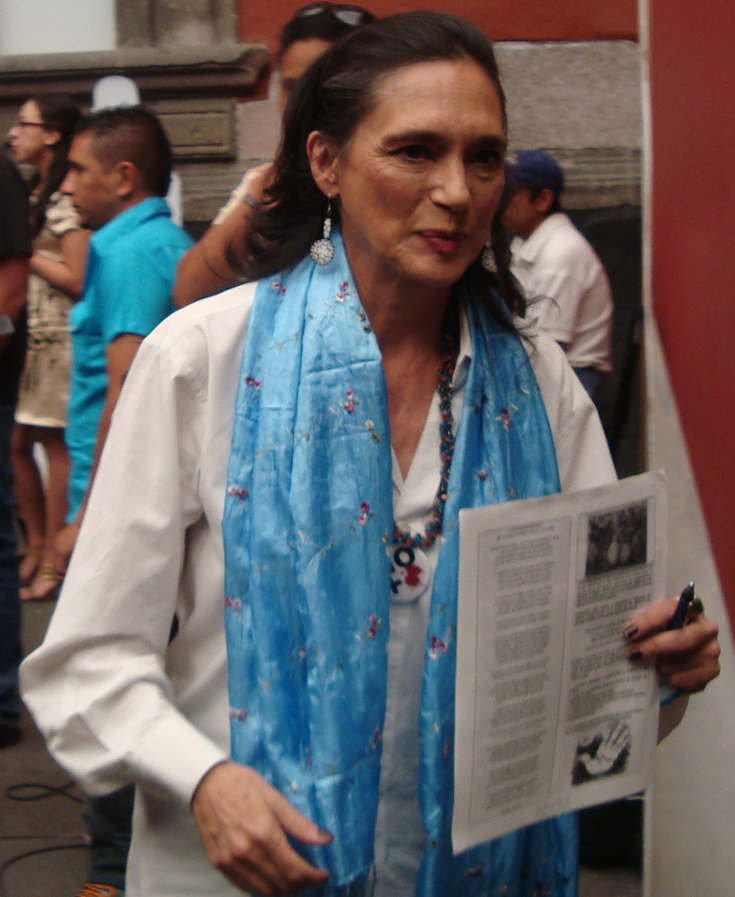
Ofelia Medina was nominated twice and won for Frida in 1985.

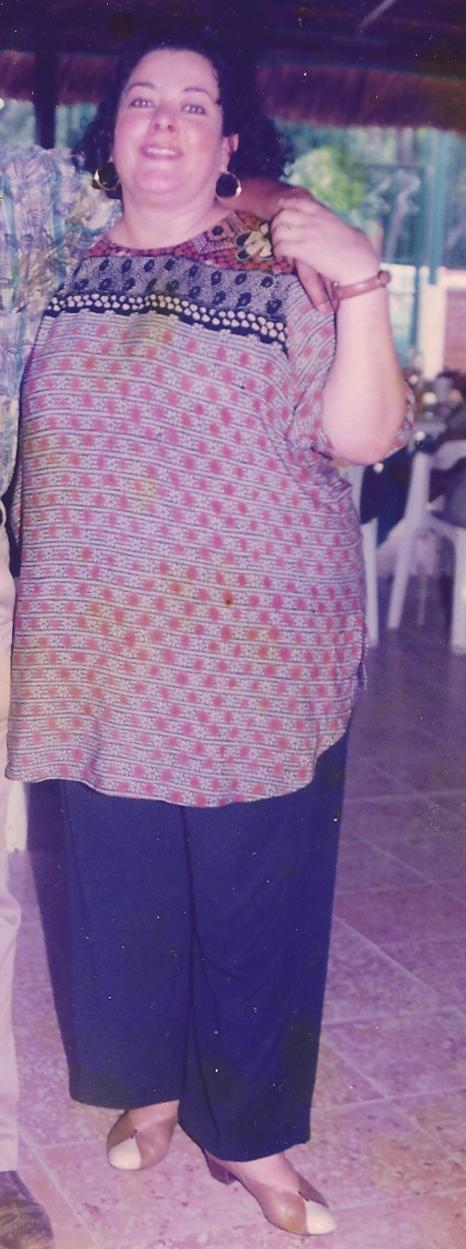
Delia Casanova won for Mentiras Piadosas in 1989.

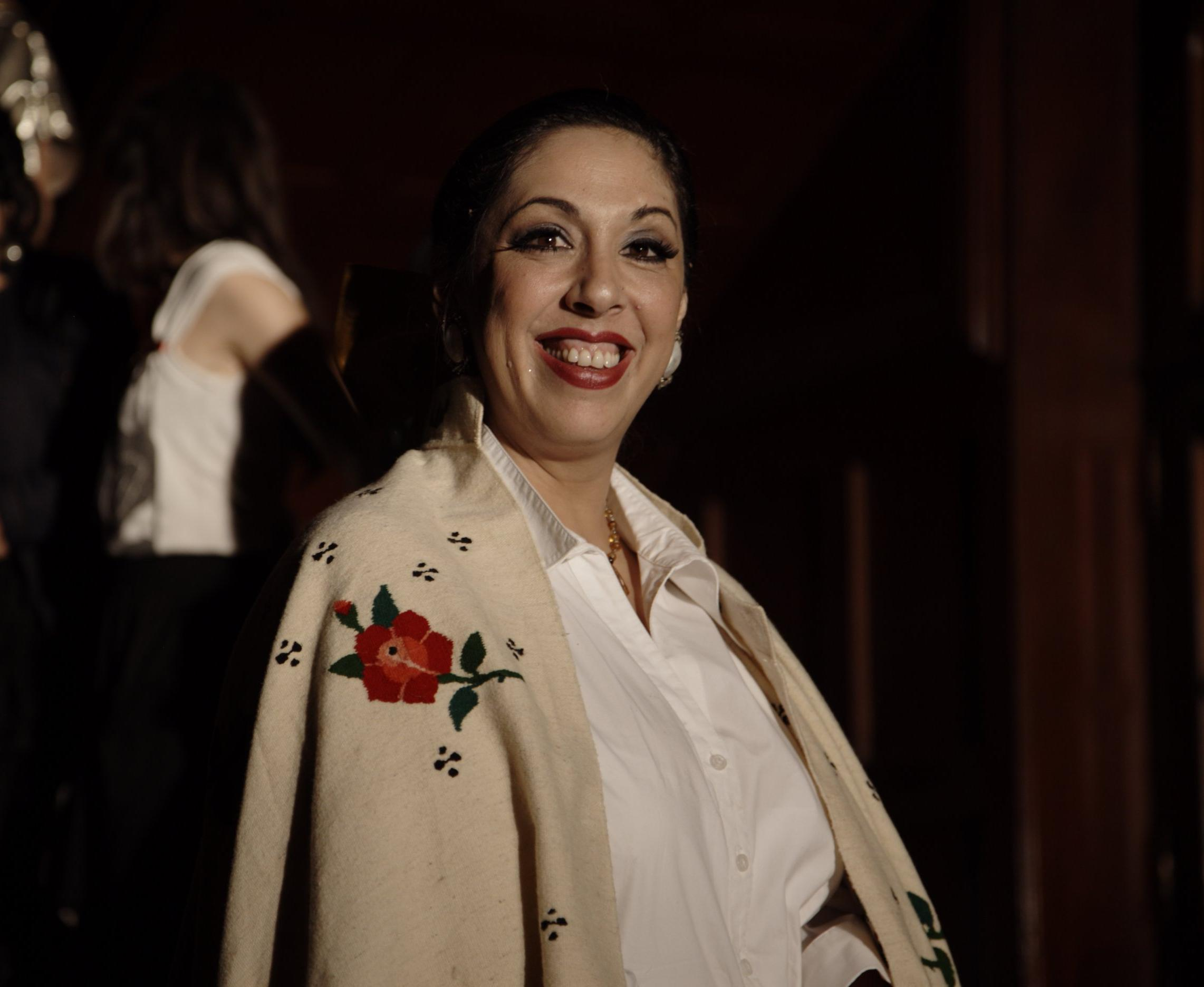
Regina Orozco won for Profundo Carmesí in 1997.

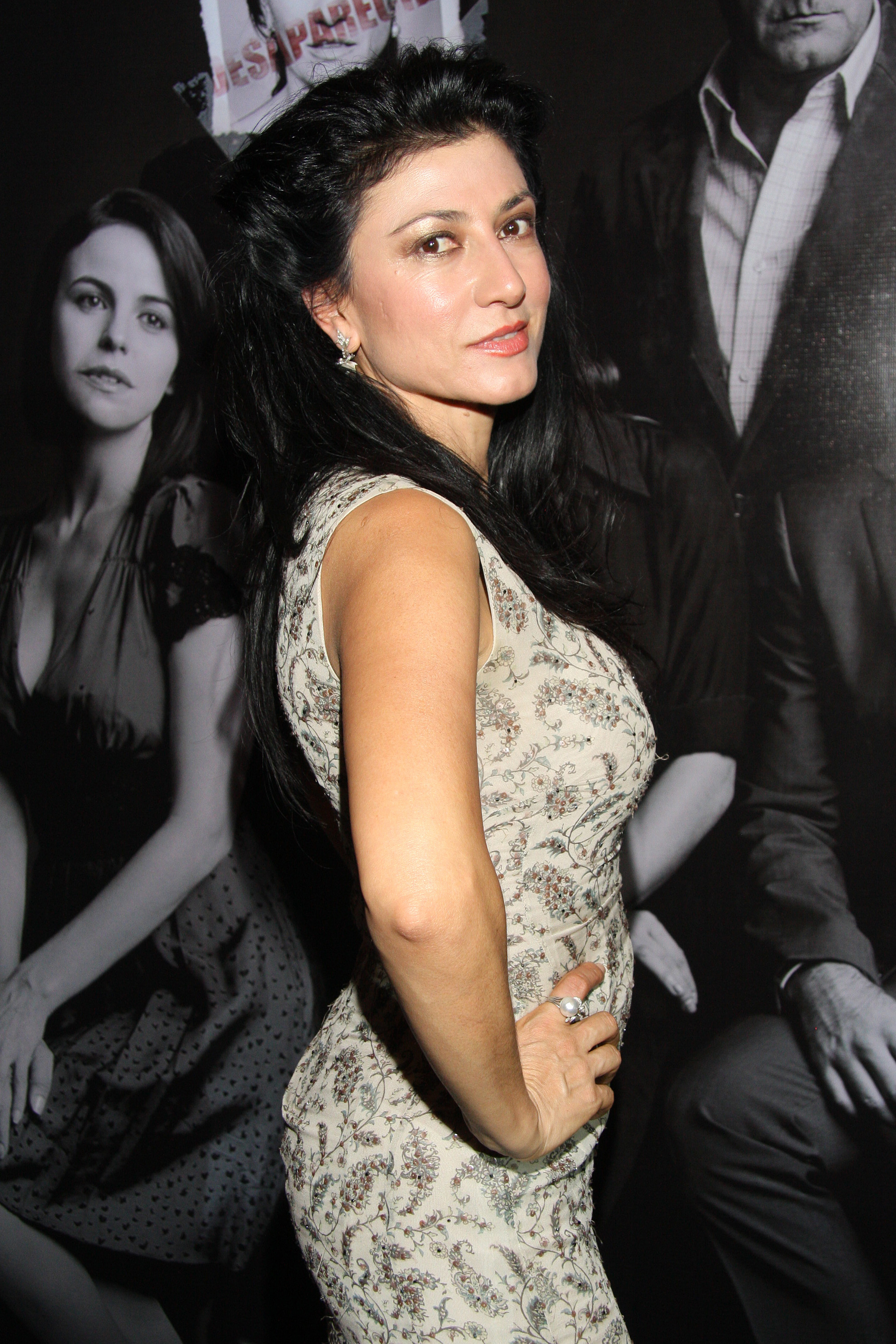
Leticia Huijara won for Por Si No Te Vuelvo a Ver in 1998.

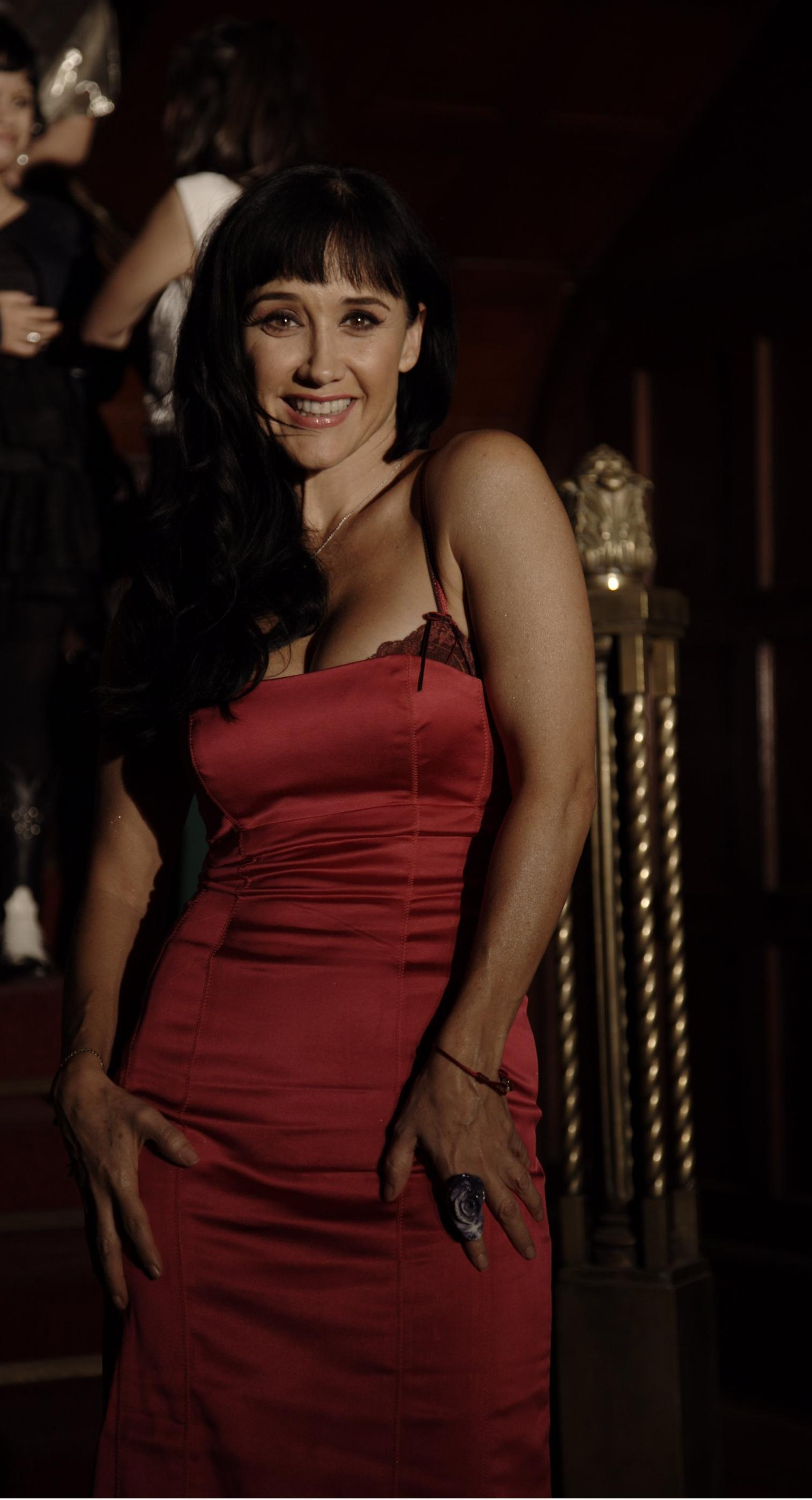
Susana Zabaleta won for Sexo, Pudor y Lágrimas in 2000.

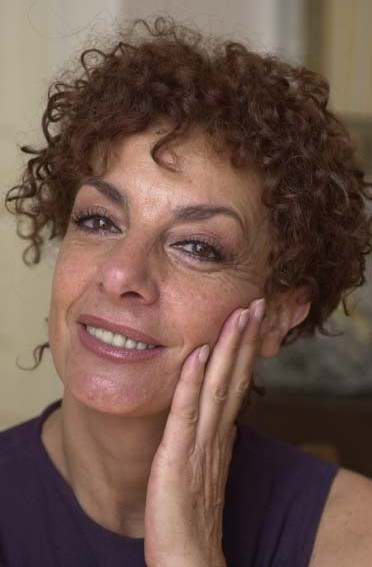
Rosa María Bianchi won for Nicotina in 2004.

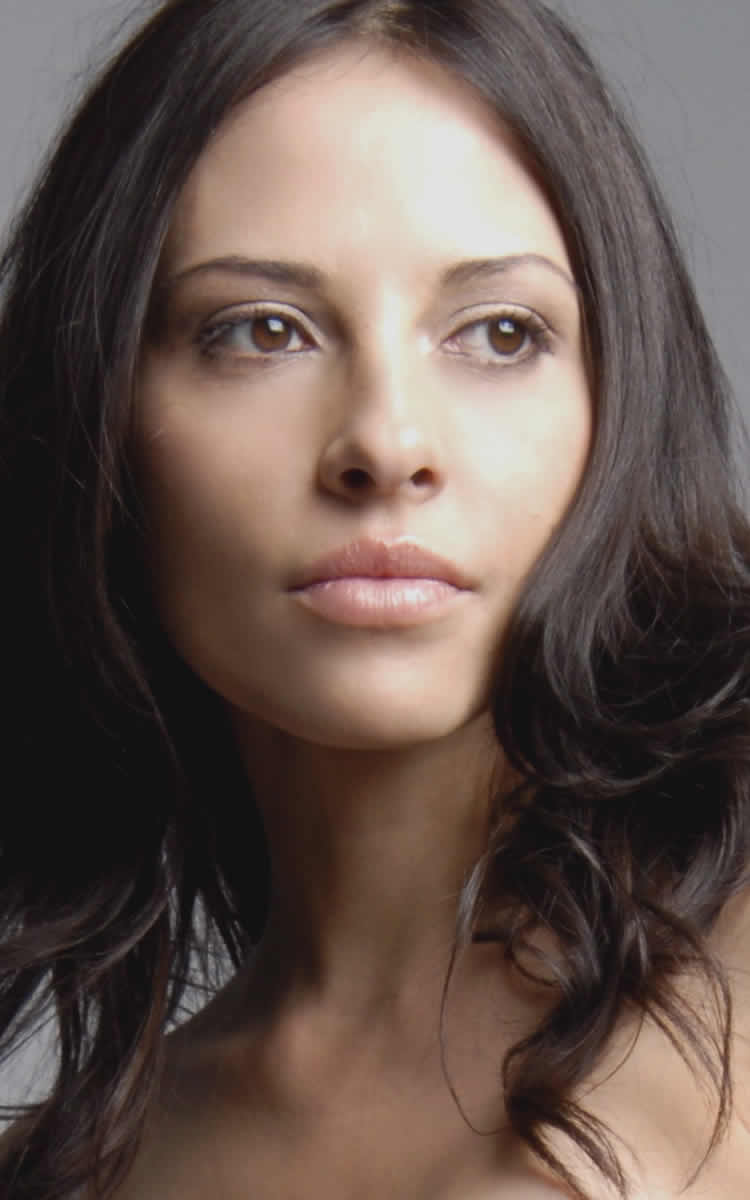
Elizabeth Cervantes won for Más Que A Nada En el Mundo in 2007.

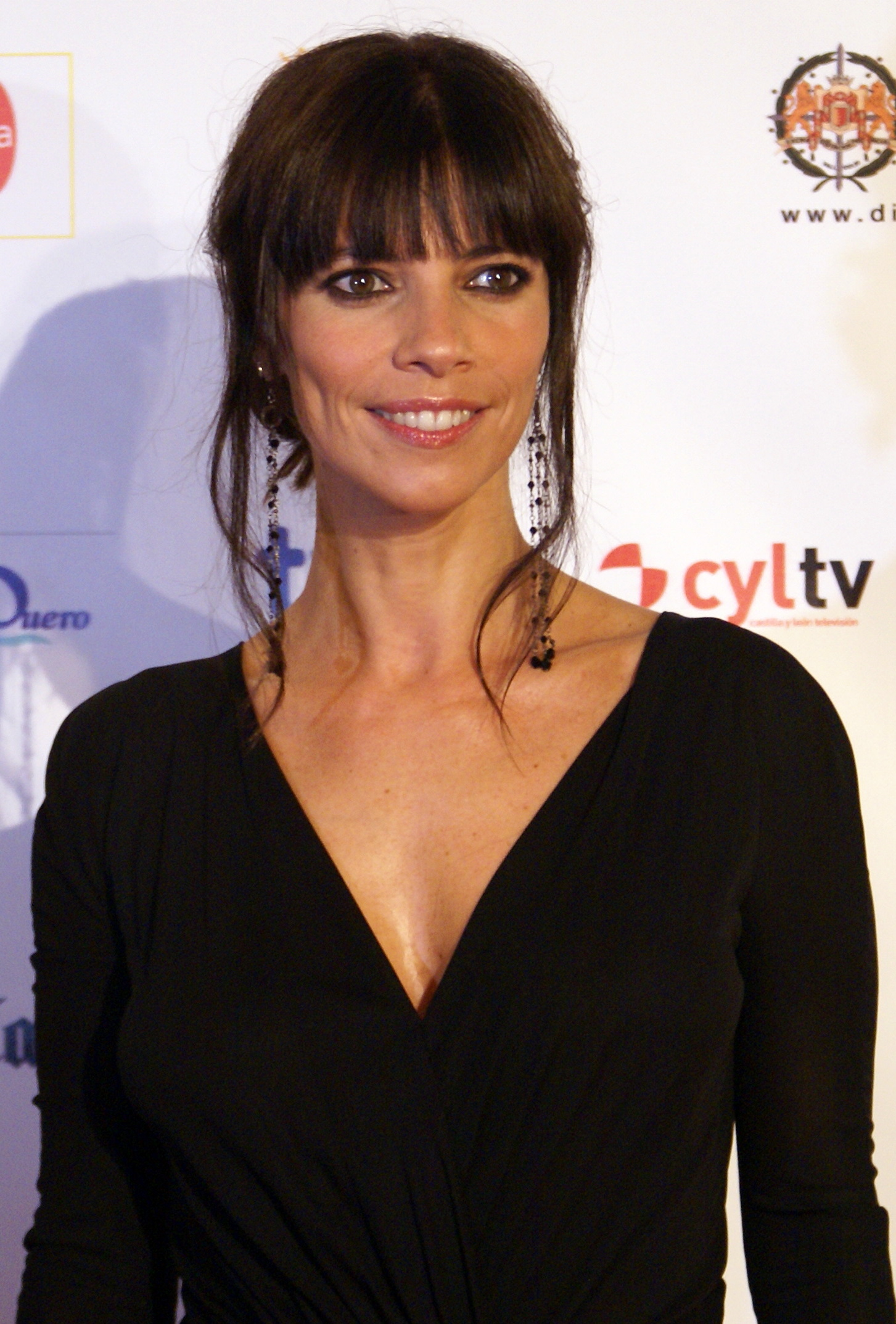
Maribel Verdú won for El Laberinto del Fauno in 2007.

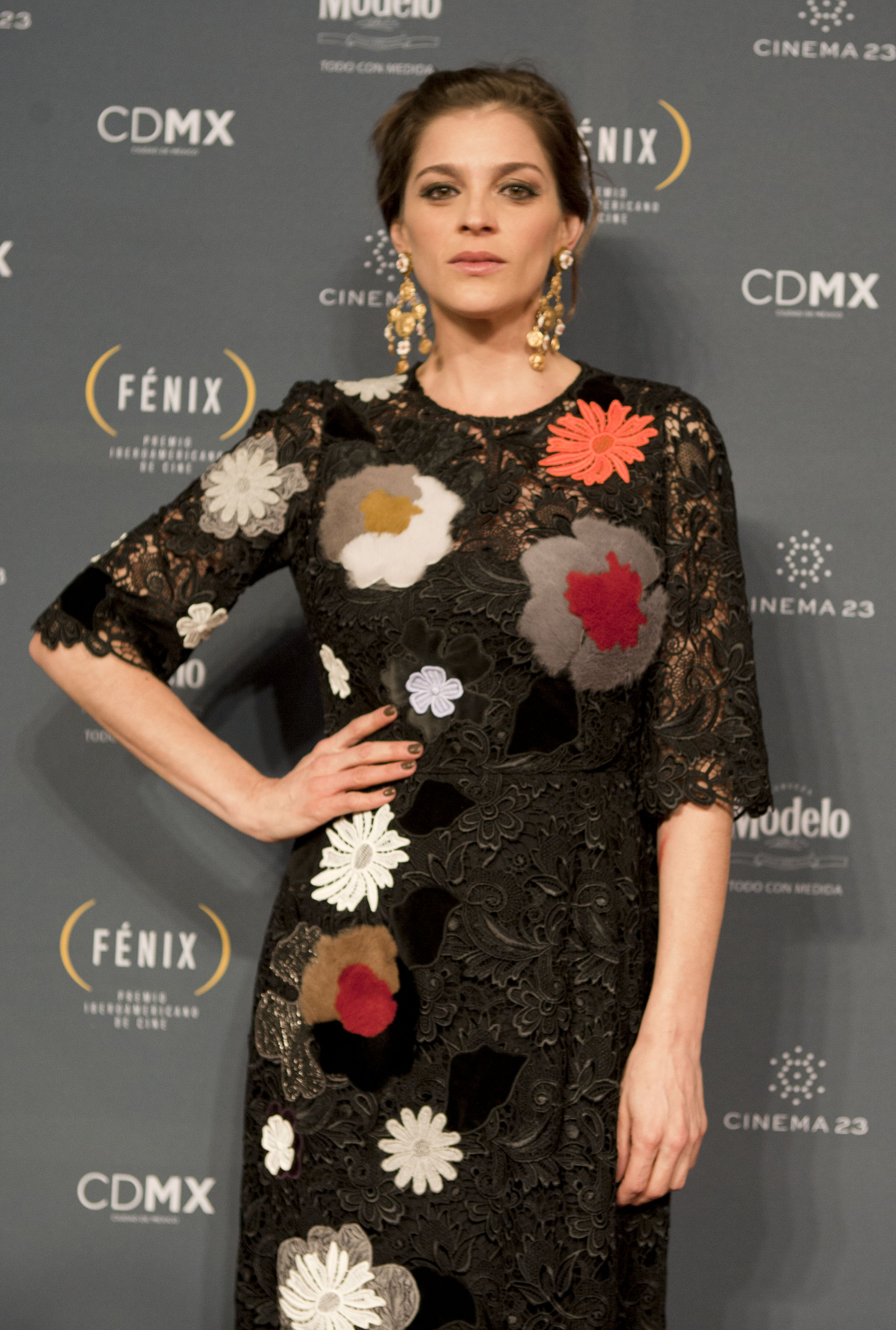
Irene Azuela won the award in two consecutive years, for Quemar las Naves (2007) and Bajo la Sal (2008).

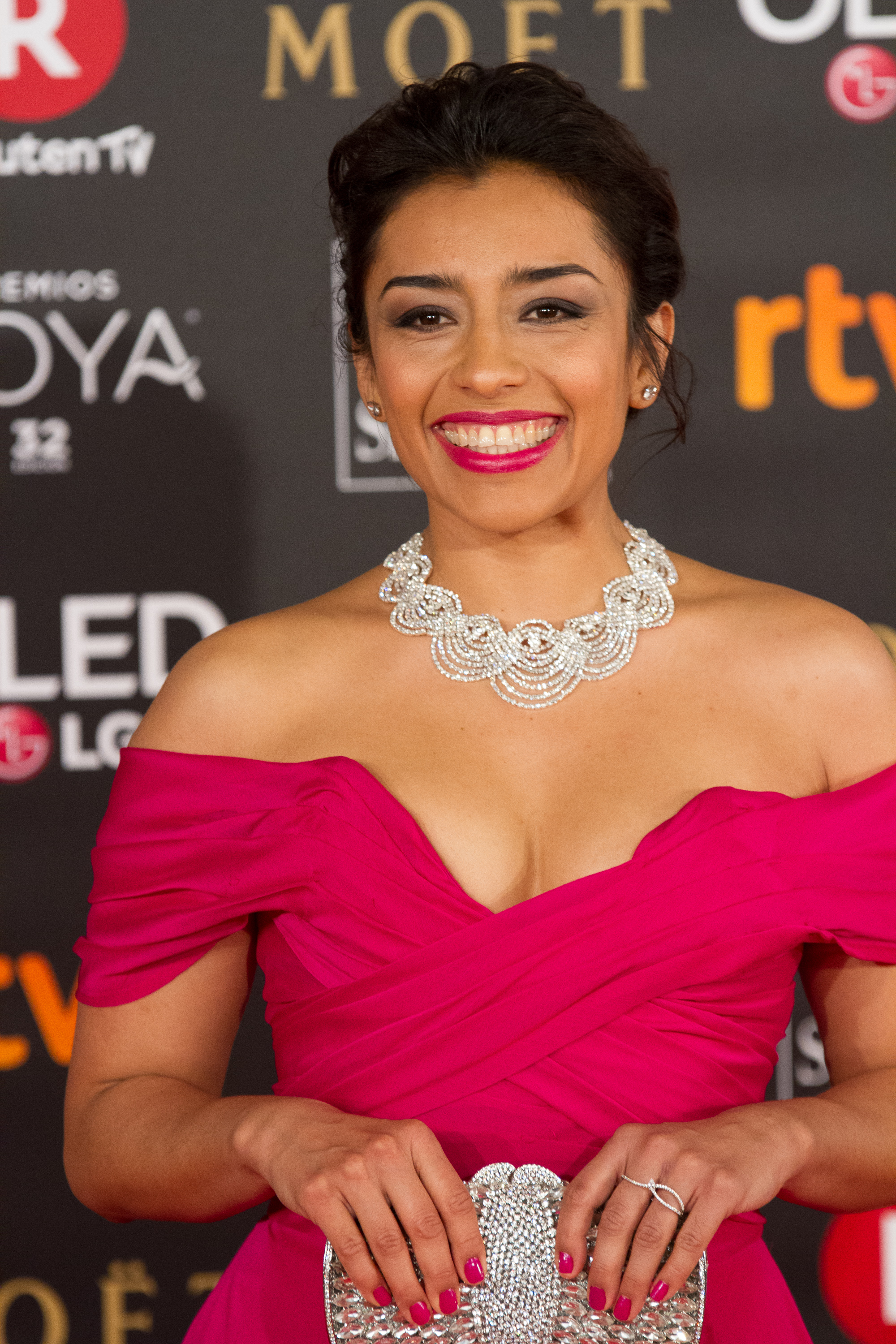
Adriana Paz won for La Tirisia in 2015.

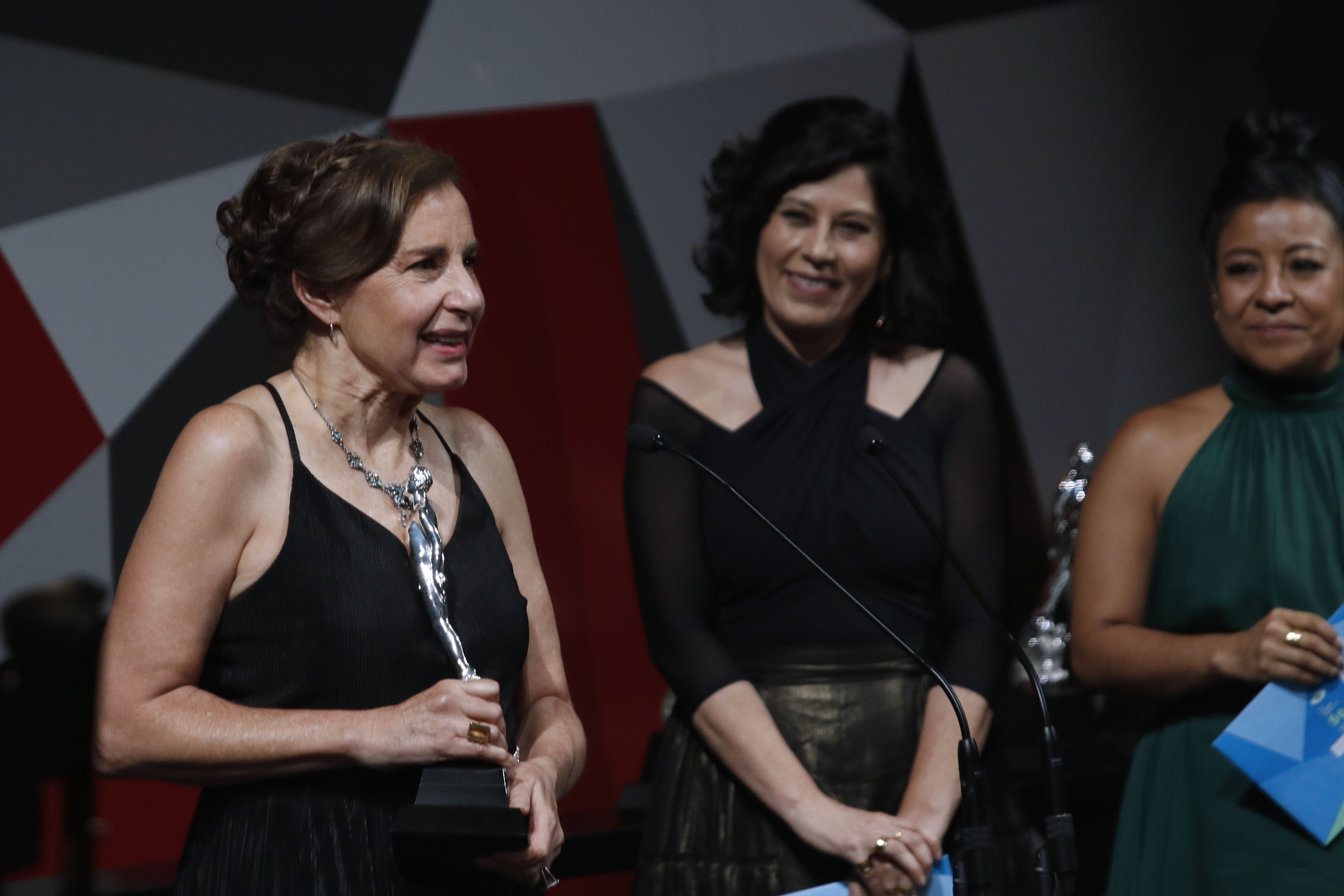
Verónica Langer (pictured left) won for La Caridad in 2017.

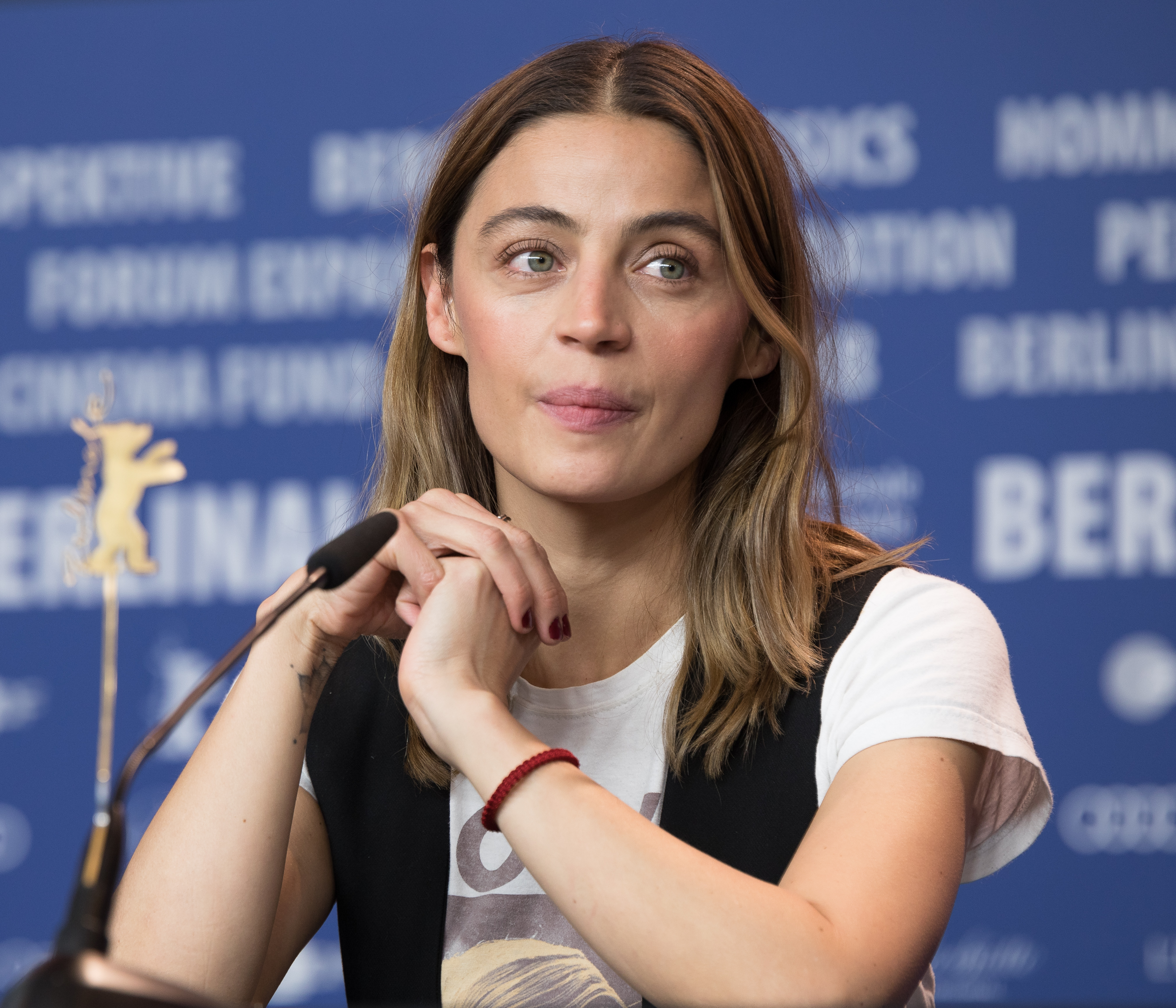
Ilse Salas won for Las Niñas Bien in 2019.

Table key
‡	Indicates the winner

Year	Nominees	Film	Ref.
1947 (1st)	Dolores del Río‡	Las Abandonadas	
1947 (1st)	Anita Blanch	La Barraca	
1947 (1st)	María Félix	El Monje Blanco	
1947 (1st)	Esther Fernández	Flor de Durazno	
1947 (2nd)	María Félix‡	Enamorada	
1947 (2nd)	Dolores del Río	La Otra	
1947 (2nd)	Rosita Díaz Gimeno	Pepita Jiménez	
1948 (3rd)	Blanca Estela Pavón‡	Cuando Lloran los Valientes	
1948 (3rd)	María Teresa Esquella	El Yugo	
1948 (3rd)	María Elena Marqués	La Perla	
1949 (4th)	María Félix‡	Río Escondido	
1949 (4th)	Gloria Marín	Si Adelita se fuera con otro	
1949 (4th)	Blanca Estela Pavón	Ustedes los Ricos	
1950 (5th)	Marga López‡	Salón México	
1950 (5th)	Rosario Granados	El Dolor de los Hijos	
1950 (5th)	Carmen Montejo	Al Caer la Tarde	
1951 (6th)	María Félix‡	Doña Diabla	
1951 (6th)	Dolores del Río	La Casa Chica	
1951 (6th)	Libertad Lamarque	Otra Primavera	
1952 (7th)	Dolores del Río‡	Doña Perfecta	
1952 (7th)	Marga López	Negro es Mi Dolor	
1952 (7th)	Irasema Dilián	Paraíso robado	
1953 (8th)	Stella Inda‡	El Rebozo de Soledad	
1953 (8th)	Libertad Lamarque	La Loca	
1953 (8th)	Marga López	Un Rincón Cerca del Cielo	
1954 (9th)	Dolores del Río‡	El Niño y la Niebla	
1954 (9th)	Laura Hidalgo	Las Tres Perfectas Casadas	
1954 (9th)	Marga López	Un Divorcio	
1955 (10th)	Marga López‡	La Entrega	
1955 (10th)	María Félix	Camelia	
1955 (10th)	Libertad Lamarque	Cuando Me Vaya	
1956 (11th)	Prudencia Grifell‡	Una Mujer en la Calle	
1956 (11th)	Marga López	Después de la Tormenta	
1956 (11th)	Silvia Pinal	Un extraño en la escalera	
1957 (12th)	Silvia Pinal‡	Locura Pasional	
1957 (12th)	Lilia Prado	Talpa	
1957 (12th)	Yolanda Varela	Los Amantes	
1958 (13th)	Silvia Pinal‡	La Dulce Enemiga	
1958 (13th)	Marilú Elizaga	La Culta Dama	
1958 (13th)	Marga López	Feliz Año, Amor Mío	
1959—1971	Not awarded		
1972 (14th)	Rita Macedo‡	"Nosotros" (episode from Tú, Yo, Nosotros)	
1972 (14th)	Julissa	"Nosotros" (episode from Tú, Yo, Nosotros)	
1972 (14th)	Isela Vega	Las Reglas del Juego	
1973 (15th)	Lucha Villa‡	Mecánica Nacional	
1973 (15th)	Maritza Olivares	Los Meses y los Días	
1973 (15th)	Helena Rojo	Los Cachorros	
1974 (16th)	Katy Jurado‡	"Caridad" (episode from Fé, Esperanza y Caridad)	
1974 (16th)	Ofelia Medina	El Cambio	
1974 (16th)	Lucha Villa	El Principio	
1975 (17th)	Pilar Pellicer‡	La Choca	
1975 (17th)	Leticia Perdigón	La Otra Virginidad	
1975 (17th)	Isela Vega	Tráiganme la Cabeza de Alfredo García	
1976 (18th)	Rocío Brambila‡	De Todos Modos Juan Te Llamas	
1976 (18th)	Patricia Aspillaga	De Todos Modos Juan Te Llamas	
1976 (18th)	Diana Bracho	Actas de Marusia	
1977 (19th)	Martha Navarro‡	La Pasión Según Berenice	
1977 (19th)	Leonor Llausás	Las Poquianchis	
1977 (19th)	María Rojo	El Apando	
1978 (20th)	María Rojo‡	Naufragio	
1978 (20th)	María Elena Marqués	El Jardín de los Cerezos	
1978 (20th)	Ana Ofelia Murguía	Naufragio	
1979 (21st)	Adriana Roel‡	Anacrusa	
1979 (21st)	Alma Muriel	Amor Libre	
1979 (21st)	Patricia Reyes Spíndola	México Norte	
1980 (22nd)	Norma Herrera‡	Fuego en el Mar	
1980 (22nd)	Blanca Guerra‡	Perro Callejero	
1980 (22nd)	Geraldine Chaplin	La Viuda de Montiel	
1981 (23rd)	Helena Rojo‡	Misterio	
1981 (23rd)	Marissa Meli	Traficantes de Pánico	
1981 (23rd)	Tina Romero	Las Grandes Aguas	
1982 (24th)	Ninón Sevilla‡	Noche de Carnaval	
1982 (24th)	Katy Jurado	La Seducción	
1982 (24th)	Alma Muriel	Retrato de Una Mujer Casada	
1983 (25th)	Beatriz Sheridan‡	Confidencias	
1983 (25th)	María Rojo	La Pachanga	
1983 (25th)	María Rojo	La Víspera	
1984 (26th)	Isela Vega‡	La Viuda Negra	
1984 (26th)	Delia Casanova	El Día que Murió Pedro Infante	
1984 (26th)	Blanca Guerra	Motel	
1985 (27th)	Ofelia Medina‡	Frida	
1985 (27th)	Alma Muriel	Luna de Sangre	
1985 (27th)	Lucy Reina	De Veras Me Atrapaste	
1986 (28th)	Patricia Reyes Spíndola‡	Los Motivos de Luz	
1986 (28th)	Elsa María Gutiérrez	Veneno Para Las Hadas	
1986 (28th)	Ana Patricia Rojo	Veneno Para Las Hadas	
1987 (29th)	Blanca Guerra‡	El Imperio de la Fortuna	
1987 (29th)	Maribel Guardia	Terror y Encajes Negros	
1987 (29th)	Gabriela Roel	Amor a la Vuelta de la Esquina	
1988 (30th)	Blanca Guerra‡	Días Dificiles	
1988 (30th)	María Rojo‡	Lo Que Importa es Vivir	
1988 (30th)	Elizabeth Aguilar	Mariana, Mariana	
1989 (31st)	Delia Casanova‡	Mentiras Piadosas	
1989 (31st)	Alma Delfina Martínez	El Costo de la Vida	
1989 (31st)	Martha Navarro	El Jinete de la Divina Providencia	
1990 (32nd)	Lourdes Elizarrarás‡	La Ciudad al Desnudo	
1990 (32nd)	Carmen Cardenal	Tres Veces Mojado	
1990 (32nd)	Patricia Rivera	Rosa de Dos Aromas	
1991 (33rd)	María Rojo‡	Rojo Amanecer	
1991 (33rd)	Gabriela Roel	Pueblo de Madera	
1992 (34th)	Regina Torné‡	Como Agua Para Chocolate	
1992 (34th)	Lumi Cavazos	Como Agua Para Chocolate	
1992 (34th)	Helena Rojo	Muerte Ciega	
1993 (35th)	Beatriz Aguirre‡	Los Años de Greta	
1993 (35th)	Ana Ofelia Murguía	Mi Querido Tom Mix	
1993 (35th)	Evangelina Sosa	Ángel de Fuego	
1994 (36th)	Lucía Muñoz‡	Principio y Fin	
1994 (36th)	Socorro Bonilla	La Vida Conyugal	
1994 (36th)	Julieta Egurrola	Principio y Fin	
1994 (36th)	Claudette Maillé	Novia Que Te Vea	
1994 (36th)	Maya Mishalska	Novia Que Te Vea	
1995 (37th)	Margarita Sanz‡	El Callejón de los Milagros	
1995 (37th)	Blanca Guerra	En Medio de la Nada	
1995 (37th)	Dolores Heredia	Dos Crimenes	
1995 (37th)	Salma Hayek	El Callejón de los Milagros	
1995 (37th)	María Rojo	Los Vuelcos del Corazón	
1996 (38th)	Patricia Reyes Spíndola‡	La Reina de la Noche	
1996 (38th)	Angélica Aragón	Sucesos Distantes	
1996 (38th)	Diana Bracho	Entre Pancho Villa y Una Mujer Desnuda	
1996 (38th)	Ana Ofelia Murguía	El Anzuelo	
1996 (38th)	Patricia Reyes Spíndola	Mujeres Insumisas	
1997 (39th)	Regina Orozco‡	Profundo Carmesí	
1997 (39th)	Arcelia Ramírez	Cilantro y Perejil	
1997 (39th)	Ana Ofelia Murguía	De Muerte Natural	
1998 (40th)	Leticia Huijara‡	Por Si No Te Vuelvo a Ver	
1998 (40th)	Sherlyn González	Elisa Antes del Fin del Mundo	
1998 (40th)	María Rojo	De Noche Vienes, Esmeralda	
1999 (41st)	Blanca Guerra‡	Un Embrujo	
1999 (41st)	Mariana Ávila	La Primera Noche	
1999 (41st)	Ana Claudia Talancón	El Cometa	
2000 (42nd)	Susana Zabaleta‡	Sexo, Pudor y Lágrimas	
2000 (42nd)	Dolores Heredia	Santitos	
2000 (42nd)	Arcelia Ramírez	En Un Claroscuro de la Luna	
2001 (43rd)	Ximena Ayala‡	Perfume de Violetas (Nadie Te Oye)	
2001 (43rd)	Ana Bertha Espin‡	Su Alteza Serenísima	
2001 (43rd)	Ana Ofelia Murguía	Escrito en el Cuerpo de la Noche	
2002 (44th)	Maya Zapata‡	De la Calle	
2002 (44th)	Karina Gidi	Demasiado Amor	
2002 (44th)	Lisa Owen	El Segundo Aire	
2003 (45th)	Carmen Beato‡	Aro Tolbukhin: En la Mente del Asesino	
2003 (45th)	Zaide Silvia Gutiérrez	Ciudades Oscuras	
2003 (45th)	Ana Claudia Talancón	El Crimen del Padre Amaro	
2004 (46th)	Rosa María Bianchi‡	Nicotina	
2004 (46th)	Magdalena Flores	Japón	
2004 (46th)	Carmen Madrid	Nicotina	
2005 (47th)	Danny Perea‡	Temporada de Patos	
2005 (47th)	Vanessa Bauche	Digna... Hasta el Último Aliento	
2005 (47th)	Ana Paula Corpus	Manos Libres (Nadie te Habla)	
2005 (47th)	Leonor Varela	Voces Inocentes	
2006 (48th)	Mayahuel del Monte‡	Noticias Lejanas	
2006 (48th)	Kate del Castillo	American Visa	
2006 (48th)	Ana Graham	Mezcal	
2007 (49th)	Elizabeth Cervantes‡	Más Que a Nada en el Mundo	
2007 (49th)	Maribel Verdú‡	El Laberinto del Fauno	
2007 (49th)	Sofia Espinosa	La Niña en la Piedra	
2008 (50th)	Irene Azuela‡	Quemar las Naves	
2008 (50th)	Cecilia Suárez	Párpados Azules	
2008 (50th)	Miriam Toews	Luz Silenciosa	
2009 (51st)	Irene Azuela‡	Bajo la Sal	
2009 (51st)	María Deschamps	I'm Gonna Explode	
2009 (51st)	Ariadna Gil	Sólo Quiero Caminar	
2010 (52nd)	Asur Zágada González‡	Backyard: El Traspatio	
2010 (52nd)	Paulina Gaitán	Cosas Insignificantes	
2010 (52nd)	Teresa Ruíz	Viaje Redondo	
2011 (53rd)	Mónica del Carmen‡	Año Bisiesto	
2011 (53rd)	Karina Gidi	Abel	
2011 (53rd)	Maricel Álvarez	Biutiful	
2011 (53rd)	Úrsula Pruneda	Las Buenas Hierbas	
2012 (54th)	Magda Vizcaíno‡	Martha	
2012 (54th)	Irán Castillo	Victorio	
2012 (54th)	Teresita Sánchez	Summer of Goliath	
2013 (55th)	Úrsula Pruneda‡	El Sueño de Lú	
2013 (55th)	Roxana Blanco	La Demora	
2013 (55th)	Tessa Ia	Despues de Lucía	
2013 (55th)	Paula Galinelli Hertzog	El Premio	
2013 (55th)	Greisy Mena	La vida precoz y breve de Sabina Rivas	
2014 (56th)	Adriana Roel‡	No Quiero Dormir Sola	
2014 (56th)	Ximena Ayala	Los Insólitos Peces Gato	
2014 (56th)	Dolores Heredia	Huérfanos	
2014 (56th)	María Renée Prudencio	Club Sandwich	
2014 (56th)	Arcelia Ramírez	Potosí	
2015 (57th)	Adriana Paz‡	La Tirisia	
2015 (57th)	Irene Azuela	Las Oscuras Primaveras	
2015 (57th)	Cassandra Ciangherotti	Las Horas Contigo	
2015 (57th)	Karina Gidi	La Guerra de Manuela Jankovic	
2015 (57th)	Ilse Salas	Güeros	
2016 (58th)	Sofía Espinosa‡	Gloria	
2016 (58th)	Geraldine Chaplin	Dólares de Arena	
2016 (58th)	Flor Edwarda Gurrola	El Placer es Mío	
2016 (58th)	Verónica Langer	Hilda	
2016 (58th)	Jana Raluy	Un Monstruo de Mil Cabezas	
2017 (59th)	Verónica Langer‡	La Caridad	
2017 (59th)	Adriana Barraza	Todo lo Demas	
2017 (59th)	Ludwika Paleta	Rumbos Paralelos	
2017 (59th)	Maya Rudolph	Mr. Pig	
2017 (59th)	Claudia Sainte–Luce	La Caja Vacía	
2018 (60th)	Karina Gidi‡	Los Adioses	
2018 (60th)	Ángeles Cruz	Tamara y la Catarina	
2018 (60th)	Cassandra Ciangherotti	Tiempo Compartido	
2018 (60th)	Angelina Peláez	Tamara y la Catarina	
2018 (60th)	Arcelia Ramírez	Verónica	
2019 (61st)	Ilse Salas‡	Las Niñas Bien	
2019 (61st)	Sophie Alexander-Katz	Los Días Más Oscuros de Nosotras	
2019 (61st)	Yalitza Aparicio	Roma	
2019 (61st)	Gabriela Cartol	La Camarista	
2019 (61st)	Concepción Márquez	Cría Puercos	
2020 (62nd)	Flor Edwarda Gurrola	Luciérnagas	
2020 (62nd)	Cassandra Ciangherotti	Solteras	
2020 (62nd)	Verónica Langer	Clases de Historia	
2020 (62nd)	Mariana Treviño	Polvo	
2020 (62nd)	Giovanna Zacarías	Sonora	
2021 (63rd)	Mercedes Hernández	Sin señas particulares	
2021 (63rd)	Mabel Cadena	El baile de los 41	
2021 (63rd)	Mónica del Carmen	Nuevo Orden	
2021 (63rd)	Naian Gonzalez Norvind	Leona	
2021 (63rd)	Martha Reyes Arias	Los Lobos	
2022 (64th)	Mónica del Carmen	Una Película de Policías	
2022 (64th)	Ana Cristina Ordóñez	Noche de Fuego	
2022 (64th)	Sylvia Pasquel	El Diablo Entre las Piernas	
2022 (64th)	Ilse Salas	Plaza Catedral	
2022 (64th)	Nora Velázquez	Cosas Imposibles	
2023 (65th)	Arcelia Ramírez	La civil	
2023 (65th)	Marta Aura	Coraje	
2023 (65th)	Julieta Egurrola	Ruido	
2023 (65th)	Natalia Solián	Huesera	
2023 (65th)	Karla Souza	La caída	
2024 (66th)	Adriana Llabrés	Todo El Silencio	
2024 (66th)	Adriana Barraza	El Último Vagón	
2024 (66th)	Cassandra Ciangherotti	Familia	
2024 (66th)	Mónica Huarte	Señora Influencer	
2024 (66th)	Ilse Salas	Familia	
2025 (67th)	Luisa Huertas	No Nos Moverán	
2025 (67th)	Naian González Norvind	Corina	
2025 (67th)	Rooney Mara	La Cocina	
2025 (67th)	Fiona Palomo	Un Actor Malo	
2025 (67th)	Adriana Paz	Arillo de Hombre Muerto	
2026 (68th)	Diana Sedano	Juana	
2026 (68th)	Mónica del Carmen	Las Mutaciones	
2026 (68th)	Emma Dib	La Eterna Adolescente	
2026 (68th)	Ángela Molina	Cosmos	
2026 (68th)	Natalia Reyes	Aún es de Noche en Caracas	

== Multiple wins and nominations ==
The following individuals have received multiple Best Actress awards:

Wins	Actress
4	Blanca Guerra
3	Dolores del Río
3	María Félix
3	María Rojo
2	Irene Azuela
2	Mónica del Carmen
2	Marga López
2	Silvia Pinal
2	Patricia Reyes Spíndola
2	Adriana Roel

The following actresses received four or more Best Actress nominations:

Nominations	Actress
8	María Rojo
7	Marga López
6	Blanca Guerra
5	Dolores del Río
5	María Félix
5	Ana Ofelia Murguía
5	Arcelia Ramírez
4	Karina Gidi
4	Ilse Salas
4	Patricia Reyes Spíndola

== See also ==
- Academy Award for Best Actress
- Best Actress Award (Cannes Film Festival)
