= Ariel Award for Best Supporting Actress =

Ariel Award category

- Awarded for: Best Performance by an Actress in a Supporting Role
- Country: Mexico
- Presented by: AMACC
- First award: 1947
- Currently held by: Ángeles Cruz, Las Locuras (2026)
- Website: premioariel.com.mx

The Ariel Award for Best Supporting Actress (Spanish: Premio Ariel a Mejor Coactuación Femenina) is an award presented by the Academia Mexicana de Artes y Ciencias Cinematográficas (AMACC) in Mexico. It is given in honor of an actor who has delivered an outstanding performance in a supporting role while working within the Mexican film industry. In 1947, the 1st and 2nd Ariel Awards were held, with Lilia Michel winning in both ceremonies for the films Un Beso en la Noche and Vértigo, respectively. With the exception of the years 1959 to 1971, when the Ariel Awards were suspended, the award has been given annually. Nominees and winners are determined by a committee formed every year consisting of academy members (active and honorary), previous winners and individuals with at least two Ariel nominations; the committee members submit their votes through the official AMACC website.

Since its inception, the award has been given to 57 actresses. Ana Ofelia Murguía and Isela Vega had received the most awards in this category with three Ariels each. Angélica Aragón, Katy Jurado, Ofelia Medina, Lilia Michel, Angelina Peláez, and Eileen Yáñez have been awarded twice; Jurado was also the first Mexican actress to be nominated for an Academy Award for Best Supporting Actress for the film Broken Lance (1954). Murguía is the most nominated performer, with eight nominations, followed by Aragón with six. In 2019, Cassandra Ciangherotti became the first performer to be nominated twice the same year, with their supporting roles in the films El Club de los Insomnes and Las Niñas Bien. Noche de Fuego (2021) is the first film to feature three nominated performances for supporting actress: Mayra Batalla, Norma Pablo, and Eileen Yáñez with Batalla winning the award.

Twenty one films have featured two nominated performances for Best Supporting Actress, Una Familia de Tantas (Eugenia Galindo and Martha Roth), Fin de Fiesta (Ana Martín and Helena Rojo), Actas de Marusia (Silvia Mariscal and Patricia Reyes Spíndola), Las Poquianchis (Ana Ofelia Murguía and María Rojo), El Lugar Sin Límites (Ana Martín and Lucha Villa), Que Viva Tepito (Leonor Llausás and Rebeca Silva), Vidas Errantes (Eugenia D'Silva and Josefina González de la Riva), Los Motivos de Luz (Murguía and Dunia Zaldívar), Como Agua Para Chocolate (Pilar Aranda and Claudette Maillé), Novia Que Te Vea (Angélica Aragón and Verónica Langer), Dos Crimenes (Leticia Huijara and Margarita Isabel), Mujeres Insumisas (Regina Orozco and Lourdes Elizarrarás), Profundo Carmesí (Julieta Egurrola and Verónica Merchant, Por Si No Te Vuelvo a Ver (Zaide Silvia Gutiérrez and Angelina Peláez), Un Embrujo (Luisa Huertas and Mayra Sérbulo), Mezcal (Aída López and Sérbulo), Fuera del Cielo (Martha Higareda and Isela Vega), Cinco Días Sin Nora (Langer and Peláez), Las Oscuras Primaveras (Margarita Sanz and Cecilia Suárez), Las Niñas Bien (Cassandra Ciangherotti and Paulina Gaitán), Leona (Sanz and Carolina Politti); Roth, Helena Rojo, Reyes Spíndola, María Rojo, Villa, Murguía, Maillé, Aragón, Isabel, Egurrola, Vega, and Peláez won the award. As of the 2026 ceremony, Ángeles Cruz won for her role in Las Locuras.

== Winners and nominees ==
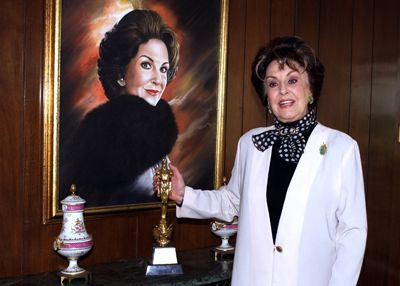
Marga López was nominated twice winning for Soledad in 1948.

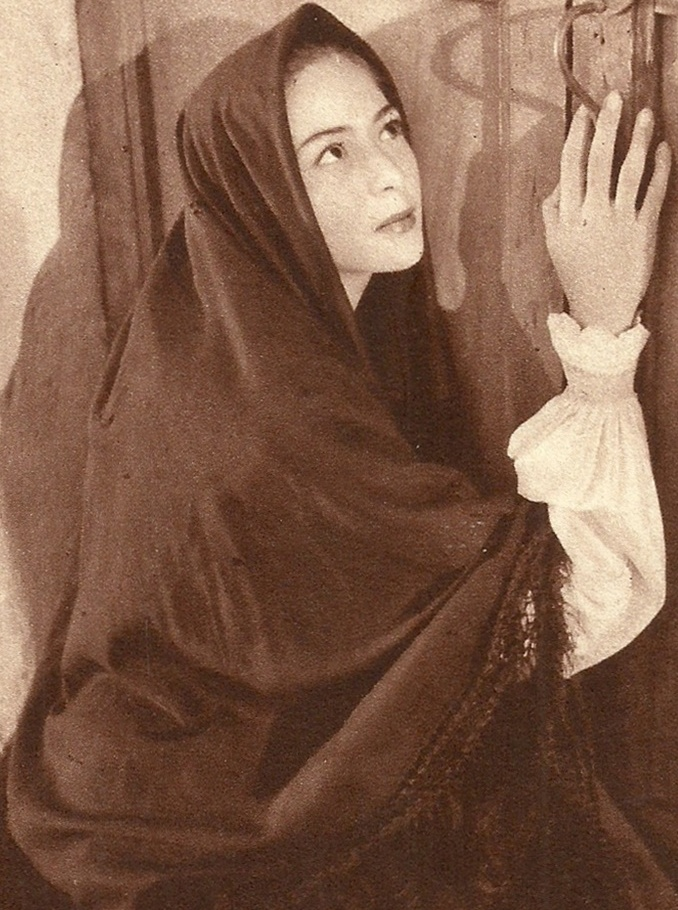
Columba Domínguez won in 1949 for her role in Maclovia.

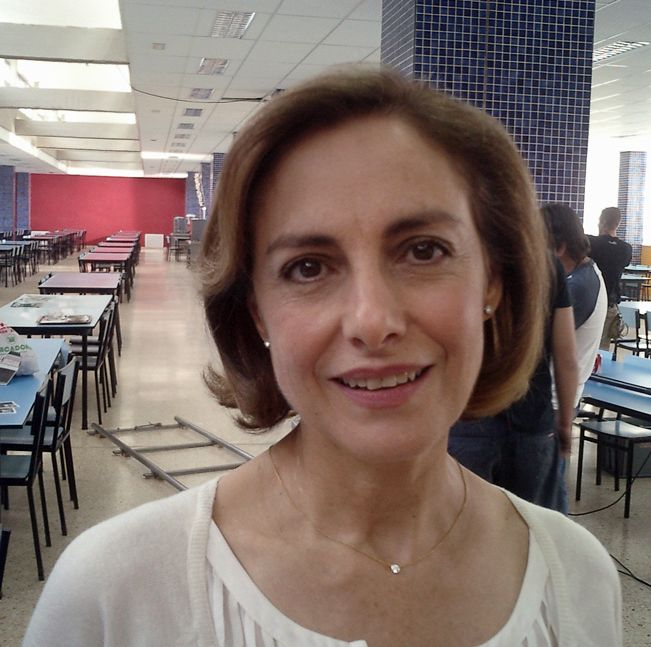
Diana Bracho won the award twice for El Castillo de la Pureza (1973) and El Infierno de Todos Tan Temido (1980).

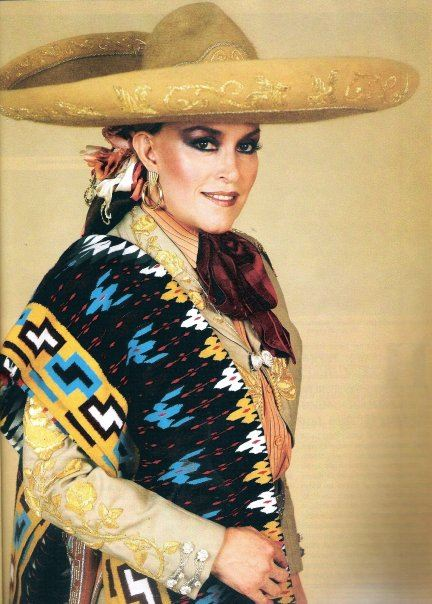
Lucha Villa received the award for El Lugar Sin Límites in 1978.

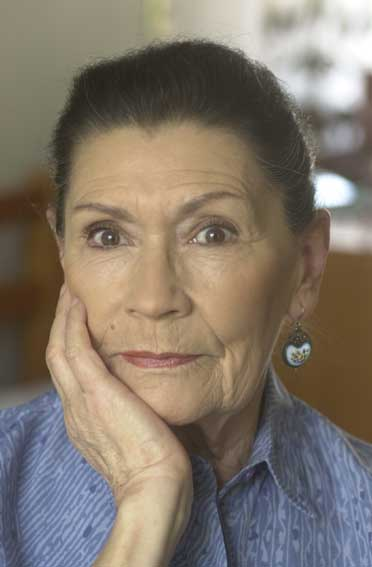
Ana Ofelia Murguía won thrice, for Cadena Perpetua (Life Sentence) (1979); Los Motivos de Luz (The Motives of Luz) (1985); & La Reina de la Noche (The Queen of the Night) (1994).

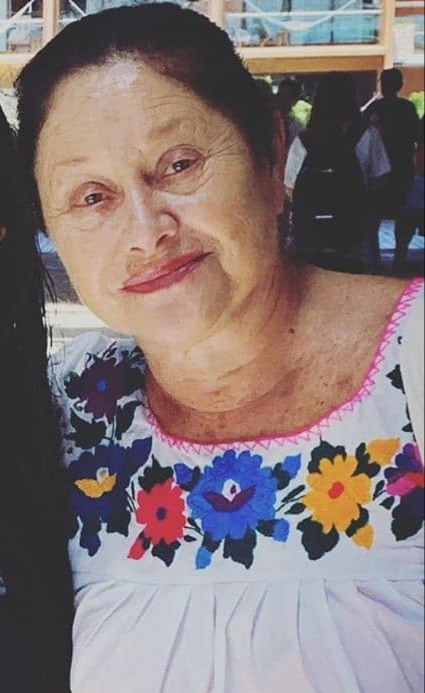
Angélica Aragón won the award twice for the films Novia Que Te Vea (1994) and El Crímen del Padre Amaro (2003).

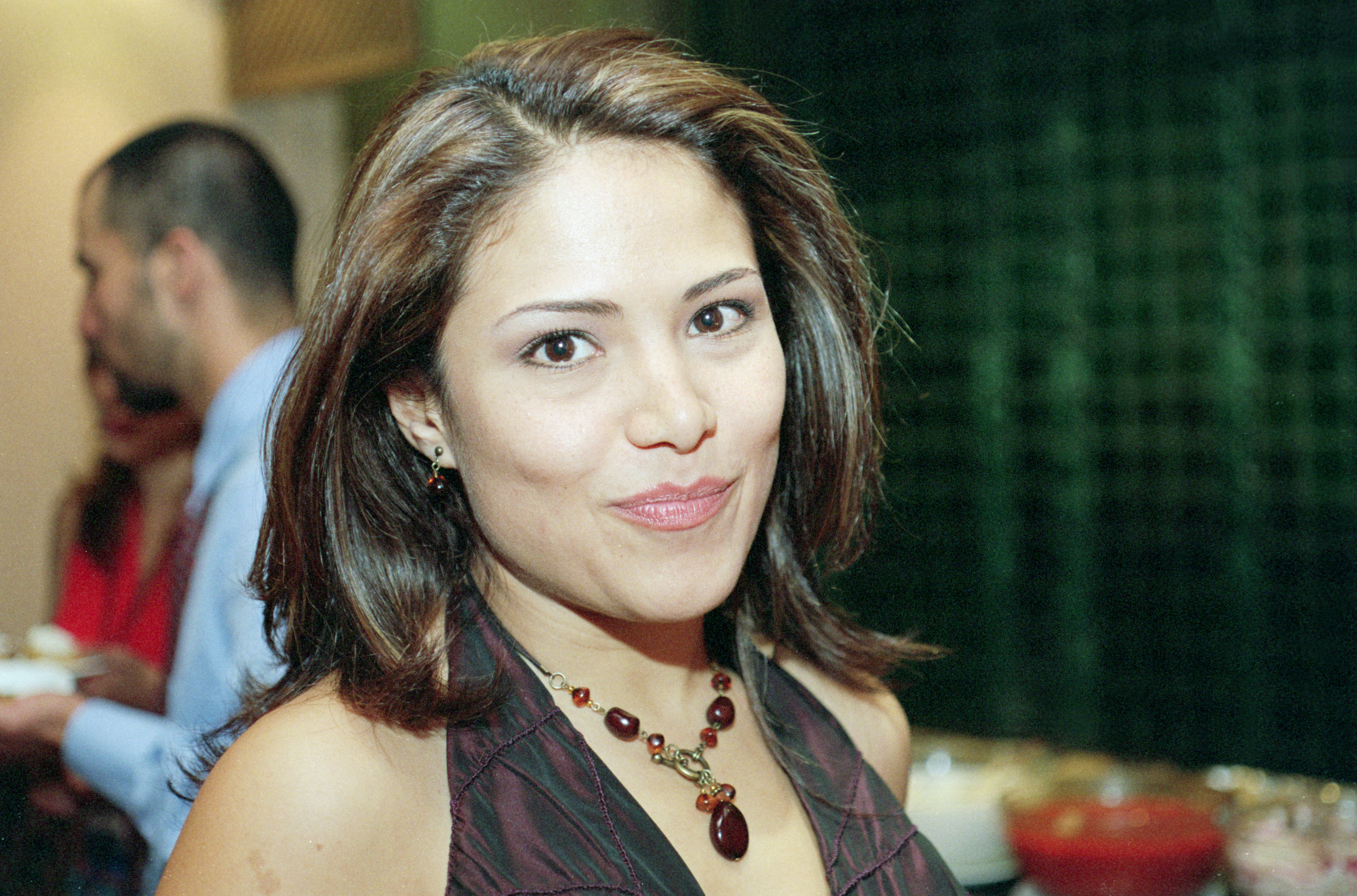
Vanessa Bauche was nominated three times and won for De La Calle in 2002.

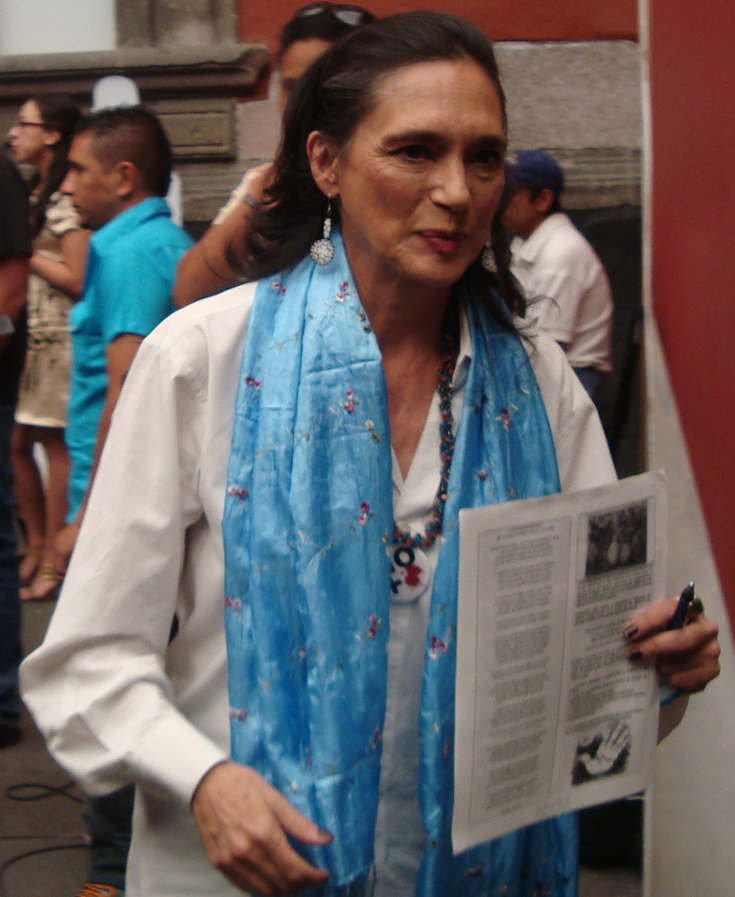
Ofelia Medina won the award twice for the films Voces Inocentes (2005) and Las Buenas Hierbas (2011).

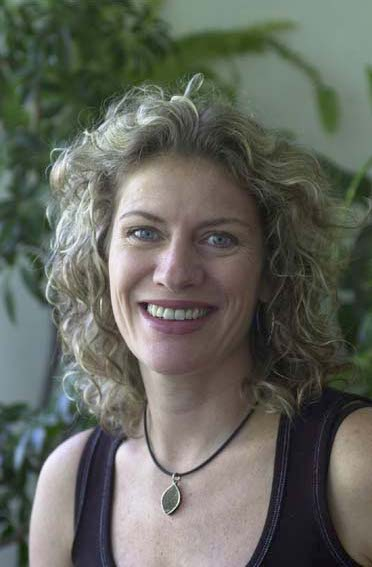
Lisa Owen won the award for the film Los Insólitos Peces Gato (2013).

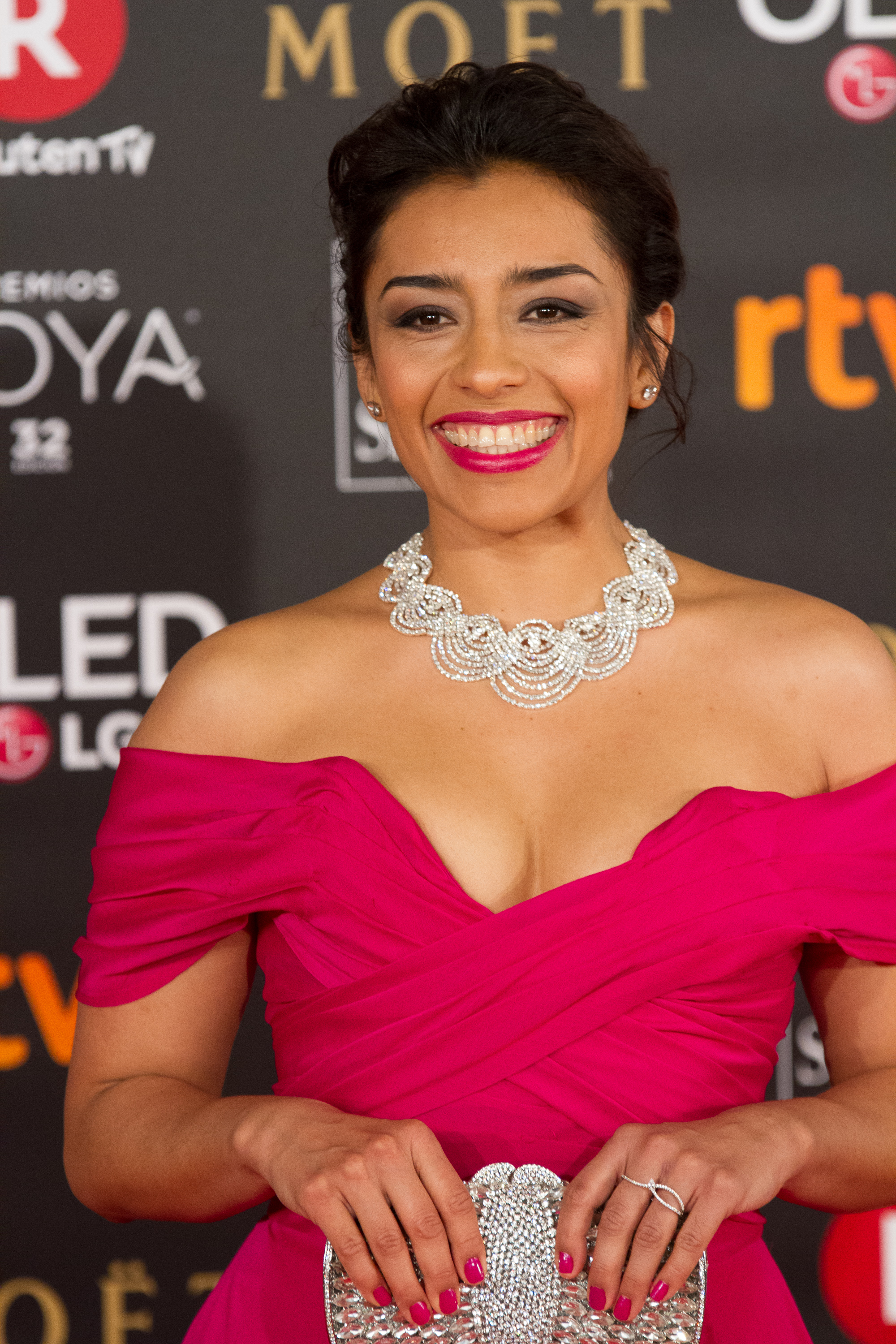
Adriana Paz won the award in 2016 and 2017 for the films Hilda and La Caridad, respectively.

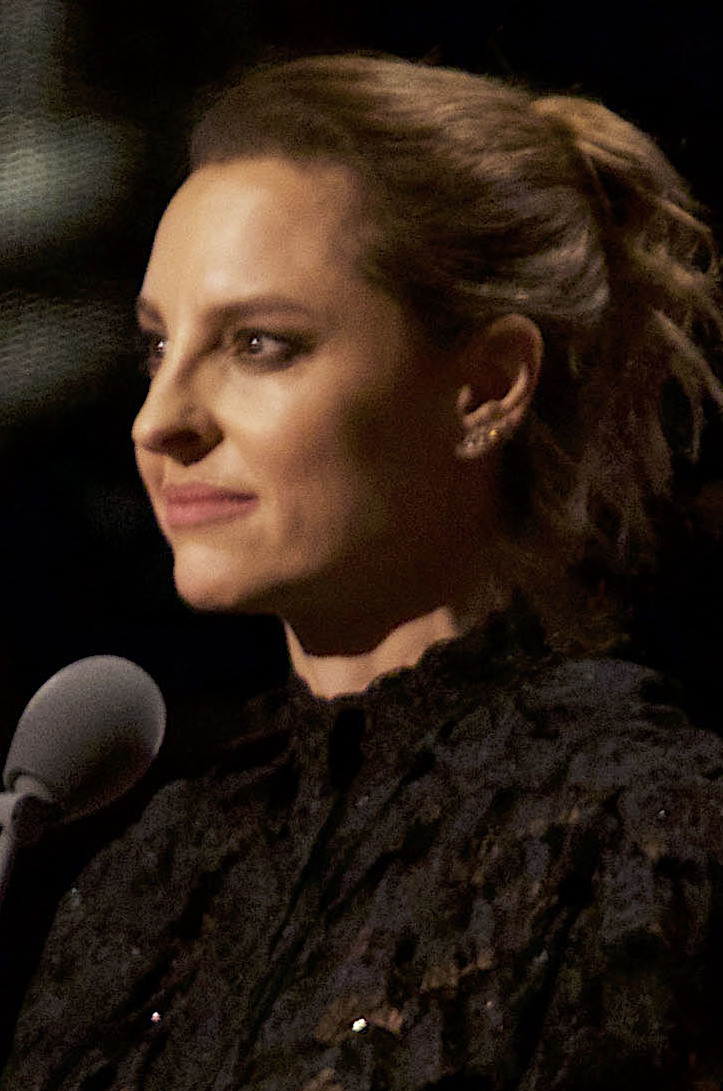
Marina de Tavira won the award in 2019 for the film Roma and was nominated for the same award at the 91st Academy Awards.

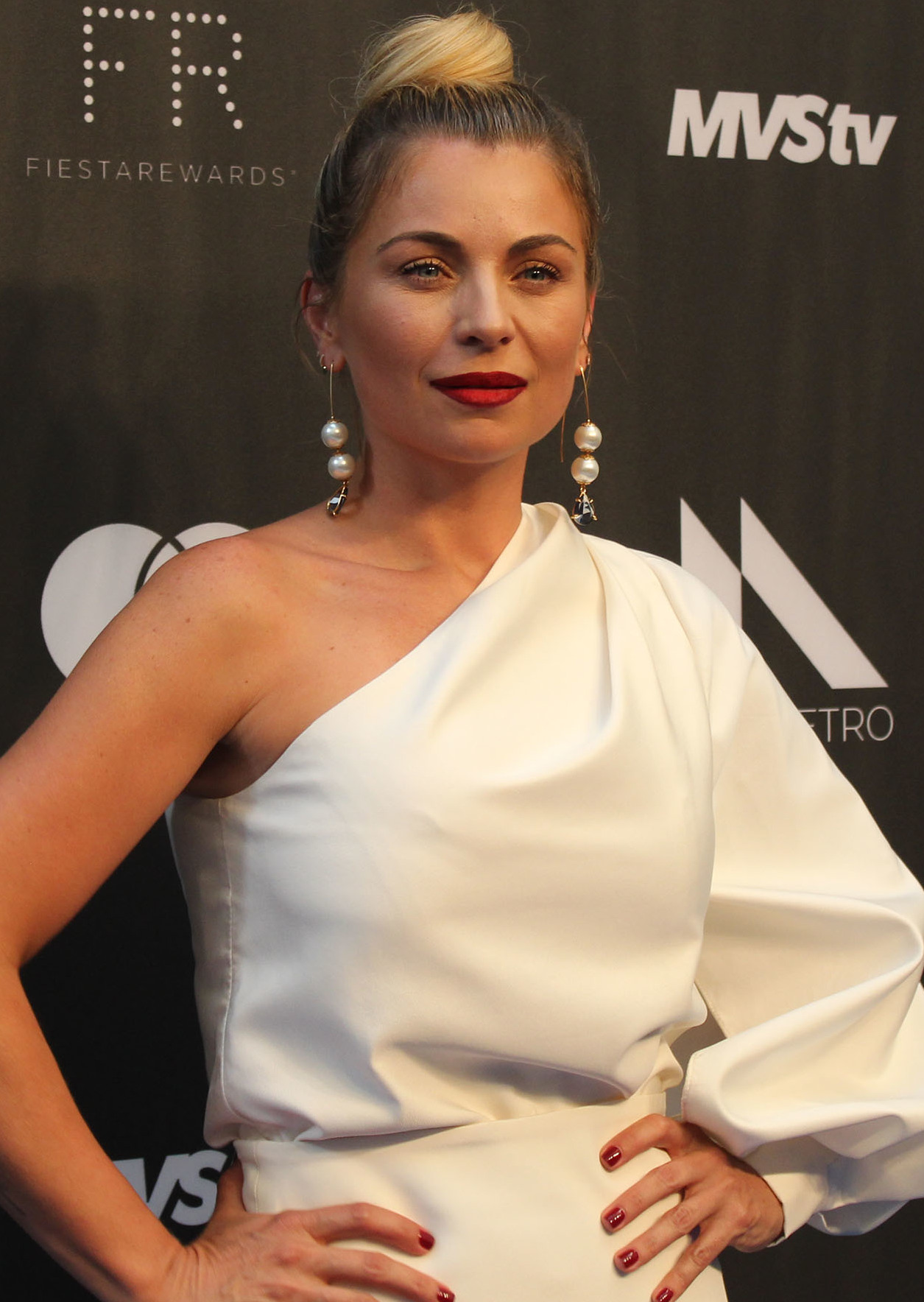
Ludwika Paleta won the award in 2024 for the film Todo El Silencio.

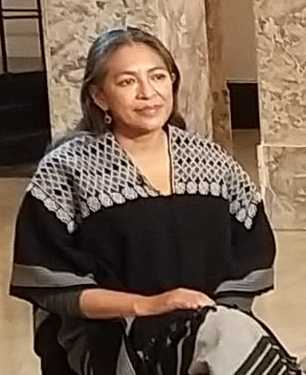
Ángeles Cruz won her fourth Ariel Award –and her first for acting– for Las Locuras in 2026.

Table key
‡	Indicates the winner

Year	Actress	Film	Ref.
1947 (1st)	Lilia Michel‡	Un Beso en la Noche	
1947 (1st)	María Douglas	El Monje Blanco	
1947 (1st)	Amparo Morillo	La Barraca	
1947 (2nd)	Lilia Michel‡	Vértigo	
1947 (2nd)	Pituka de Foronda	Sinfonía de una vida	
1947 (2nd)	Marga López	Mamá Inés	
1948 (3rd)	Marga López‡	Soledad	
1948 (3rd)	Fanny Schiller	A Media Luz	
1948 (3rd)	Blanca Estela Pavón	Vuelven los García	
1949 (4th)	Columba Domínguez‡	Maclovia	
1949 (4th)	Carmen Molina	Las Mañanitas	
1950 (5th)	Martha Roth‡	Una Familia de Tantas	
1950 (5th)	Eugenia Galindo	Una Familia de Tantas	
1951 (6th)	Stella Inda‡	Los Olvidados	
1951 (6th)	Patricia Morán	Otra Primavera	
1951 (6th)	Rosaura Revueltas	Un Día de Vida	
1952 (7th)	Carmen Montejo‡	Mujeres Sin Mañana	
1952 (7th)	Rita Montaner	Negro es Mi Dolor	
1952 (7th)	Natalia Ortíz	Doña Perfecta	
1953 (8th)	Silvia Pinal‡	Un Rincón Cerca del Cielo	
1953 (8th)	María Douglas	La Ausente	
1953 (8th)	Carmen Montejo	Sor Alegría	
1954 (9th)	Katy Jurado‡	El Bruto	
1954 (9th)	Miroslava	Las Tres Perfectas Casadas	
1954 (9th)	Amanda del Llano	Reportaje	
1955 (10th)	Amanda del Llano‡	La Rebelión de Los Colgados	
1955 (10th)	Magda Guzmán	La Duda	
1955 (10th)	Carmen Montejo	La Infame	
1956 (11th)	Blanca de Castejón‡	Escuela de Vagabundos	
1956 (11th)	Rita Macedo	Ensayo de un Crimen	
1956 (11th)	Amparo Villegas	Una Mujer en la Calle	
1957 (12th)	Sara García‡	La Tercera Palabra	
1957 (12th)	Silvia Derbez	El Rey de México	
1957 (12th)	Hortensia Santoveña	Talpa	
1958 (13th)	Lucy Gallardo‡	Bambalinas	
1958 (13th)	Gloria Lozano	La Culta Dama	
1958 (13th)	Maricruz Olivier	Esposa Te Doy	
1959—1971	Not awarded		
1972 (14th)	Helena Rojo‡	Fin de Fiesta	
1972 (14th)	Rocío Brambila	Muñeca Reina	
1972 (14th)	Ana Martín	Fin de Fiesta	
1973 (15th)	Diana Bracho‡	El Castillo de la Pureza	
1973 (15th)	Anita Blanch	Los Días del Amor	
1973 (15th)	Gloria Marín	Mecánica Nacional	
1974 (16th)	Lina Montes‡	El Principio	
1974 (16th)	Carolina Barret	Calzonzin Inspector	
1974 (16th)	Mercedes Carreño	Los Perros de Dios	
1975 (17th)	Mercedes Carreño‡	La Choca	
1975 (17th)	Anita Blanch	Presagio	
1975 (17th)	Rosenda Monteros	Rapiña	
1976 (18th)	Patricia Reyes Spíndola‡	Actas de Marusia	
1976 (18th)	Graciela Doring	Coronación	
1976 (18th)	Silvia Mariscal	Actas de Marusia	
1977 (19th)	María Rojo‡	Las Poquianchis	
1977 (19th)	Ana Ofelia Murguía	Las Poquianchis	
1977 (19th)	Adriana Roel	Renuncia por Motivos de Salud	
1978 (20th)	Lucha Villa‡	El Lugar Sin Límites	
1978 (20th)	Ana Martin	El Lugar Sin Límites	
1978 (20th)	Yara Patricia	Los Pequeños Privilegios	
1979 (21st)	Ana Ofelia Murguía‡	Cadena Perpetua	
1979 (21st)	Blanca Guerra	Pedro Páramo: El Hombre de la Media Luna	
1979 (21st)	Ana Martin	Los Indolentes	
1980 (22nd)	Diana Bracho‡	El Infierno de Todos Tan Temido	
1980 (22nd)	Isabela Corona	El Infierno de Todos Tan Temido	
1980 (22nd)	Gloriella Morris	En la Cuerda del Hambre	
1981 (23rd)	Beatriz Sheridan‡	Misterio	
1981 (23rd)	Leonor Llausás	Que Viva Tepito	
1981 (23rd)	Rebeca Silva	Que Viva Tepito	
1982 (24th)	Julissa‡	Distrito Federal	
1982 (24th)	Viridiana Alatriste	La Seducción	
1982 (24th)	Ana Ofelia Murguía	¡Ora Si Tenemos Que Ganar!	
1983 (25th)	Patricia Rivera‡	Tiempo de Lobos	
1983 (25th)	Gloria Marín	Aquel Famoso Remington	
1984 (26th)	Carmelita González‡	Motel	
1984 (26th)	Margarita Isabel	Las Apariencias Engañan	
1984 (26th)	Beatriz Marín	Bajo la Metralla	
1985 (27th)	Margarita Sanz‡	Frida	
1985 (27th)	Eugenia D'Silva	Vidas Errantes	
1985 (27th)	Josefina González de la Riva	Vidas Errantes	
1986 (28th)	Ana Ofelia Murgía‡	Los Motivos de Luz	
1986 (28th)	Gina Romand	Gavilán o Paloma	
1986 (28th)	Dunia Zaldívar	Los Motivos de Luz	
1987 (29th)	Claudia Guzmán‡	Terror y Encajes Negros	
1987 (29th)	Ana Ofelia Murguía	Chido Guan: El Tacos de Oro	
1987 (29th)	Alejandra Peniche	Noches de Califas	
1988 (30th)	Saby Kamalich‡	Mariana, Mariana	
1988 (30th)	Angélica Aragón‡	La Furia de un Dios	
1988 (30th)	Patricia Reyes Spíndola	Los Confines	
1989 (31st)	Dolores Beristáin‡	El Secreto de Romelia	
1989 (31st)	Claudia Guzmán	Violación	
1989 (31st)	Patricia Pereyra	Largo Camino a Tijuana	
1990 (32nd)	Laura Forastieri‡	El Homicida	
1990 (32nd)	Claudia Guzmán	Violencia de Domicilio	
1990 (32nd)	Alma Delfina Martínez	Casos de Alarma I: Sida	
1991 (33rd)	Claudia Fernández‡	Por Tu Maldito Amor	
1991 (33rd)	Angélica Aragón	Pueblo de Madera	
1992 (34th)	Claudette Maillé‡	Como Agua Para Chocolate	
1992 (34th)	Pilar Aranda	Como Agua Para Chocolate	
1992 (34th)	Malena Doria	La Mujer de Benjamín	
1993 (35th)	Meche Barba‡	Los Años de Greta	
1993 (35th)	Angélica Aragón	Gertrudis	
1993 (35th)	Lilia Aragón	Ángel de Fuego	
1994 (36th)	Angélica Aragón‡	Novia Que Te Vea	
1994 (36th)	Ada Carrasco	Un Año Perdido	
1994 (36th)	Luisa Huertas	Principio y Fin	
1994 (36th)	Verónica Langer	Novia Que Te Vea	
1994 (36th)	Regina Orozco	Dama de Noche	
1995 (37th)	Margarita Isabel‡	Dos Crímenes	
1995 (37th)	Vanessa Bauche	Hasta Morir	
1995 (37th)	Leticia Huijara	Dos Crimenes	
1995 (37th)	Tiare Scanda	El Callejón de los Milagros	
1995 (37th)	Ana Ofelia Murguía	El Jardín del Edén	
1996 (38th)	Ana Ofelia Murguía‡	La Reina de la Noche	
1996 (38th)	Delia Casanova	Sobrenatural	
1996 (38th)	Lourdes Elizarrarás	Mujeres Insumisas·	
1996 (38th)	Blanca Guerra	Salón México	
1996 (38th)	Gina Morett	Sin Remitente	
1996 (38th)	Regina Orozco	Mujeres Insumisas	
1996 (38th)	Leticia Perdigón	Doble Indemnización	
1997 (39th)	Julieta Egurrola‡	Profundo Carmesí	
1997 (39th)	Angélica Aragón	De Muerte Natural	
1997 (39th)	Verónica Merchant	Profundo Carmesí	
1998 (40th)	Martha Navarro‡	De Noche Vienes, Esmeralda	
1998 (40th)	Zaide Silvia Gutiérrez	Por Si No Te Vuelvo a Ver	
1998 (40th)	Angelina Peláez	Por Si No Te Vuelvo a Ver	
1999 (41st)	Katy Jurado‡	El Evangelio de las Maravillas	
1999 (41st)	Luisa Huertas	Un Embrujo	
1999 (41st)	Mayra Sérbulo	Un Embrujo	
2000 (42nd)	Isela Vega‡	La Ley de Herodes	
2000 (42nd)	Ángeles Cruz	Rito Terminal	
2000 (42nd)	Mónica Dionne	Sexo, Pudor y Lágrimas	
2001 (43rd)	Arcelia Ramírez‡	Perfume de Violetas (Nadie Te Oye)	
2001 (43rd)	Ana Ofelia Murguía	Su Alteza Serenísima	
2001 (43rd)	Fabiana Perzabal‡	Crónica de un Desayuno	
2002 (44th)	Vanessa Bauche‡	De la Calle	
2002 (44th)	Diana Bracho	Las Caras de la Luna	
2002 (44th)	Mayra Sérbulo	Cuento de Hadas Para Dormir Cocodrilos	
2003 (45th)	Angélica Aragón‡	El Crimen del Padre Amaro	
2003 (45th)	Leticia Huijara	Ciudades Oscuras	
2003 (45th)	Arcelia Ramírez	Francisca... De Qué Lado Estás?	
2004 (46th)	Clarisa Rendón‡	Mil Nubes de Paz Cercan el Cielo, Amor, Jamás Acabarás de Ser Amor	
2004 (46th)	Regina Blandón	El Misterio del Trinidad	
2004 (46th)	Maite Embil	La Tregua	
2005 (47th)	Ofelia Medina‡	Voces Inocentes	
2005 (47th)	Yuriria del Valle	Manos Libres (Nadie te Habla)	
2005 (47th)	Paloma Woolrich	Santos Peregrinos	
2006 (48th)	Gina Morett‡	Noticias Lejanas	
2006 (48th)	Aída López	Mezcal	
2006 (48th)	Mayra Sérbulo	Mezcal	
2007 (49th)	Isela Vega‡	Fuera del Cielo	
2007 (49th)	Alejandra Gollás‡	Efectos Secundarios	
2007 (49th)	Martha Higareda	Fuera del Cielo	
2008 (50th)	María Pankratz‡	Luz Silenciosa	
2008 (50th)	Miriana Moro	Drama/Mex	
2008 (50th)	Mayra Sérbulo	La Zona	
2009 (51st)	Eileen Yáñez‡	Desierto Adentro	
2009 (51st)	Adriana Paz	Rudo y Cursi	
2009 (51st)	Daniela Valentine	Lake Tahoe	
2010 (52nd)	Angelina Peláez‡	Cinco Días Sin Nora	
2010 (52nd)	Sonia Couoh	Norteado	
2010 (52nd)	Verónica Langer	Cinco Días Sin Nora	
2011 (53rd)	Ofelia Medina‡	Las Buenas Hierbas	
2011 (53rd)	Luisa Huertas	La Mitad del Mundo	
2011 (53rd)	Carolina Politti	Hidalgo: La Historia Jamás Contada	
2011 (53rd)	María Rojo	El Infierno	
2012 (54th)	Eileen Yáñez‡	Días de Gracia	
2012 (54th)	Norma Angélica	Acorazado	
2012 (54th)	Nailea Norvind	La Otra Familia	
2013 (55th)	Angelina Peláez‡	La vida precoz y breve de Sabina Rivas	
2013 (55th)	Mari Carmen Farías	El Sueño de Lú	
2013 (55th)	Sharon Herrera	El Premio	
2014 (56th)	Lisa Owen‡	Los Insólitos Peces Gato	
2014 (56th)	Sonia Couoh	Potosí	
2014 (56th)	Mariana Gajá	No Quiero Dormir Sola	
2014 (56th)	Linda González	Heli	
2014 (56th)	Rebecca Jones	Tercera Llamada	
2015 (57th)	Isela Vega‡	Las Horas Contigo	
2015 (57th)	Mercedes Hernández	La Tirisia	
2015 (57th)	Margarita Sanz	Las Oscuras Primaveras	
2015 (57th)	Cecilia Suárez	Las Oscuras Primaveras	
2015 (57th)	Mima Vikovic	La Guerra de Manuela Jankovic	
2016 (58th)	Adriana Paz‡	Hilda	
2016 (58th)	Vanessa Bauche	Elvira, te daría mi vida pero la estoy usando	
2016 (58th)	Cassandra Ciangherotti	Tiempos Felices	
2016 (58th)	Alicia Quiñonez	Las Elegidas	
2016 (58th)	Isela Vega	El Jeremías	
2017 (59th)	Adriana Paz‡	La Caridad	
2017 (59th)	Carmen Beato	Los Parecidos	
2017 (59th)	Xochiquetzal Rodríguez	La Carga	
2017 (59th)	Tiaré Scanda	El Cumple de la Abuela	
2017 (59th)	Mariana Treviño	La Vida Inmoral de la Pareja Ideal	
2018 (60th)	Verónica Toussaint‡	Oso Polar	
2018 (60th)	Simone Bucio	La Región Salvaje	
2018 (60th)	Tessa Ia	Los Adioses	
2018 (60th)	Joanna Larequi	Las Hijas de Abril	
2018 (60th)	Fátima Molina	Sueño en Otro Idioma	
2019 (61st)	Marina de Tavira‡	Roma	
2019 (61st)	Cassandra Ciangherotti	El Club de los Insomnes	
2019 (61st)	Cassandra Ciangherotti	Las Niñas Bien	
2019 (61st)	Paulina Gaitán	Las Niñas Bien	
2019 (61st)	Teresa Sánchez	La Camarista	
2020 (62nd)	Mónica del Carmen‡	Asfixia	
2020 (62nd)	Dolores Heredia	Chicuarotes	
2020 (62nd)	Dolores Heredia	Sonora	
2020 (62nd)	Bárbara Mori	El Complot Mongol	
2020 (62nd)	Ximena Romo	Esto no es Berlín	
2021 (63rd)	Cici Lau‡	Los Lobos	
2021 (63rd)	Carolina Politti	Leona	
2021 (63rd)	Nailea Norvind	El club de los idealistas	
2021 (63rd)	Michelle Rodríguez	Te Llevo Conmigo	
2021 (63rd)	Margarita Sanz	Leona	
2022 (64th)	Mayra Batalla	Noche de Fuego	
2022 (64th)	Mabel Cadena	La Diosa del Asfalto	
2022 (64th)	Aída López	Nudo Mixteco	
2022 (64th)	Norma Pablo	Noche de Fuego	
2022 (64th)	Eileen Yañez	Noche de Fuego	
2023 (65th)	Úrsula Pruneda	Trigal	
2023 (65th)	Mayra Batalla	Huesera	
2023 (65th)	Dolores Heredia	El Norte Sobre el Vacío	
2023 (65th)	Martha Claudia Moreno	Huesera	
2023 (65th)	Nicolasa Ortíz Monasterio	Trigal	
2024 (66th)	Montserrat Marañón	Tótem	
2024 (66th)	Ludwika Paleta	Todo El Silencio	
2024 (66th)	Myriam Bravo	Valentina o la Serenidad	
2024 (66th)	Marisol Gasé	Tótem	
2024 (66th)	Teresa Sánchez	Tótem	
2025 (67th)	Yadira Pérez Esteban	Sujo	
2025 (67th)	Mayra Batalla	Pedro Páramo	
2025 (67th)	Laura de Ita	Corina	
2025 (67th)	Carolina Politi	Corina	
2025 (67th)	Agustina Quinci	We Shall Not Be Moved	
2025 (67th)	Guiovanna Zacarías	Pedro Páramo	
2026 (68th)	Ángeles Cruz	Las Locuras	
2026 (68th)	Arcelia Ramírez	Cocodrilos	
2026 (68th)	Ruth Ramos	La Eterna Adolescente	
2026 (68th)	Teresita Sánchez	Cocodrilos	
2026 (68th)	Margarita Sanz	Juana	

== Multiple wins and nominations ==
The following individuals have received multiple Best Supporting Actress awards:

Wins	Actress
3	Ana Ofelia Murguía
3	Isela Vega
2	Angélica Aragón
2	Diana Bracho
2	Katy Jurado
2	Ofelia Medina
2	Lilia Michel
2	Adriana Paz
2	Angelina Peláez
2	Eileen Yáñez

The following actresses received three or more Best Supporting Actress nominations:

Nominations	Actress
8	Ana Ofelia Murguía
6	Angélica Aragón
4	Margarita Sanz
4	Maryra Sérbulo
4	Isela Vega
3	Mayra Batalla
3	Vanessa Bauche
3	Cassandra Ciangherotti
3	Claudia Guzmán
3	Dolores Heredia
3	Luisa Huertas
3	Ana Martín
3	Carmen Montejo
3	Adriana Paz
3	Angelina Peláez
3	Arcelia Ramírez
3	Teresita Sánchez

== See also ==
- Academy Award for Best Supporting Actress
