= Patricia Reyes Spíndola =

Mexican actress, director and producer (born 1953)

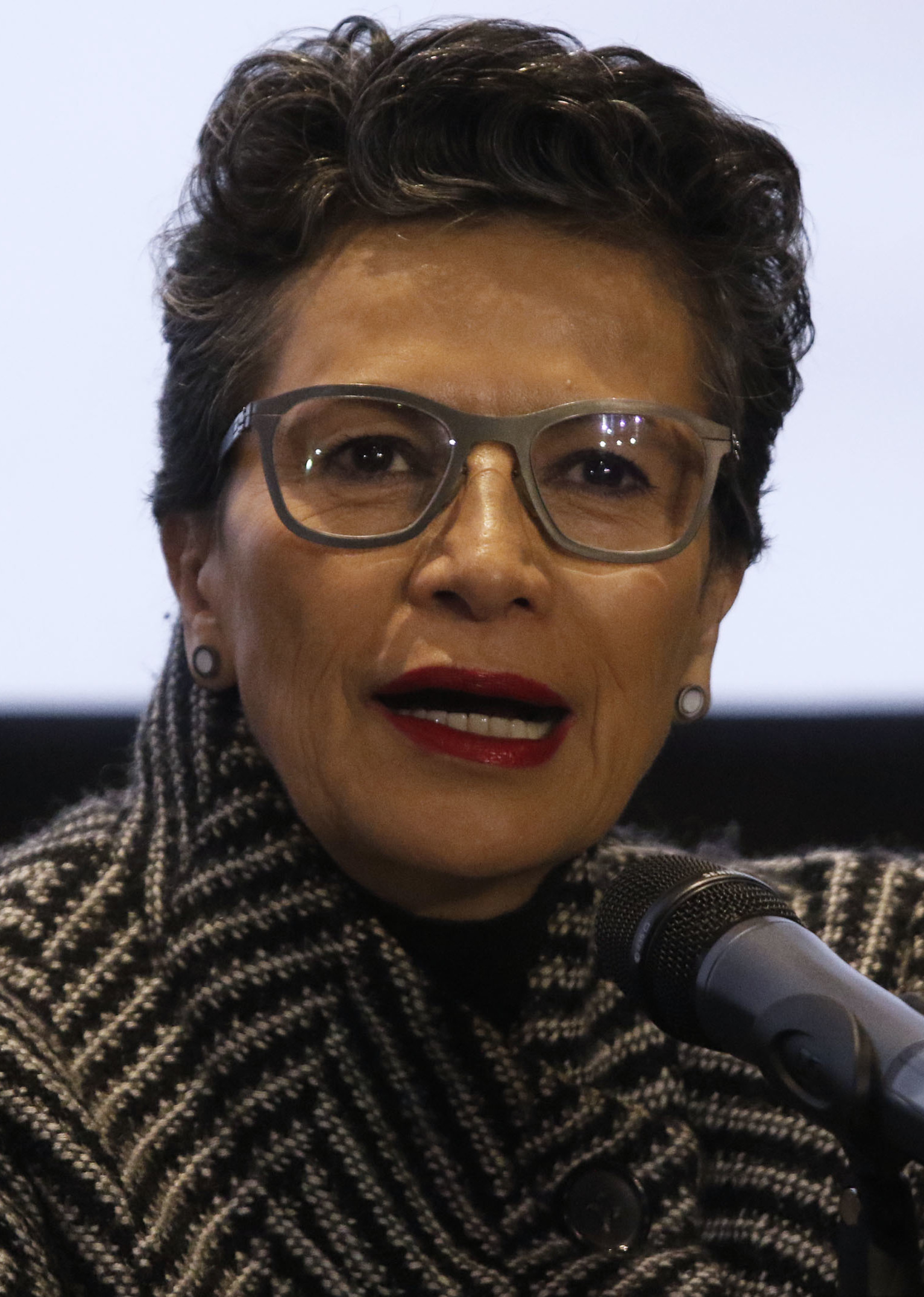
- Reyes Spíndola in 2019
- Born: Patricia Verónica Núñez Reyes Spíndola; 11 July 1953 (age 73); Oaxaca City, Oaxaca, Mexico
- Occupation: Actress
- Years active: 1974–present

Patricia Verónica Núñez Reyes Spíndola (born 11 July 1953) is a Mexican actress, director, and producer. She has received four Ariel Awards, two for Best Actress (Los Motivos de Luz in 1985 and The Queen of the Night in 1994), and two for Supporting Actress (Letters from Marusia in 1975 and El otro crimen in 1988).

== Life and career ==
Spíndola studied to become an actress in several ateliers in Mexico and London. She made her movie début in 1972, with El señor de Osanto, and two years later she started working in the Teatro Fru Fru. As an actress, she has worked with directors like Nancy Cárdenas and Arturo Ripstein.

Spíndola has appeared in more than 70 Mexican movies during her career. She received four Ariel Awards and two additional nominations for her film performances. In 2002, she played Frida Kahlo's mother, Matilde, in the American film Frida.

Spíndola has worked in Mexican telenovelas as of early 1980s, playing mostly antagonists. In early 2000s, she also began working as a director. Her directing credits include Salomé (2001), La intrusa (2001), and 85 episodes of La mujer del Vendaval (2012–13).

Spíndola has an acting school she runs with her sister, Marta Reyes Spíndola, in the Colonia Juárez neighborhood of Mexico City called M & M Studio, where she also teaches.

On American television, Spíndola guest-starred in four episodes in the first season of AMC's Fear the Walking Dead as Griselda Salazar in 2015 and later made two guest appearances in the second season in 2016. In 2019, she starred opposite Kate del Castillo in the second season of Telemundo/Netflix series La Reina del Sur playing Carmen Martínez.

Spíndola is a cancer survivor. In 2011, she was diagnosed with breast cancer and came through mastectomy. In April 2015, she released her book called La vuelta da muchas vidas.

== Filmography ==
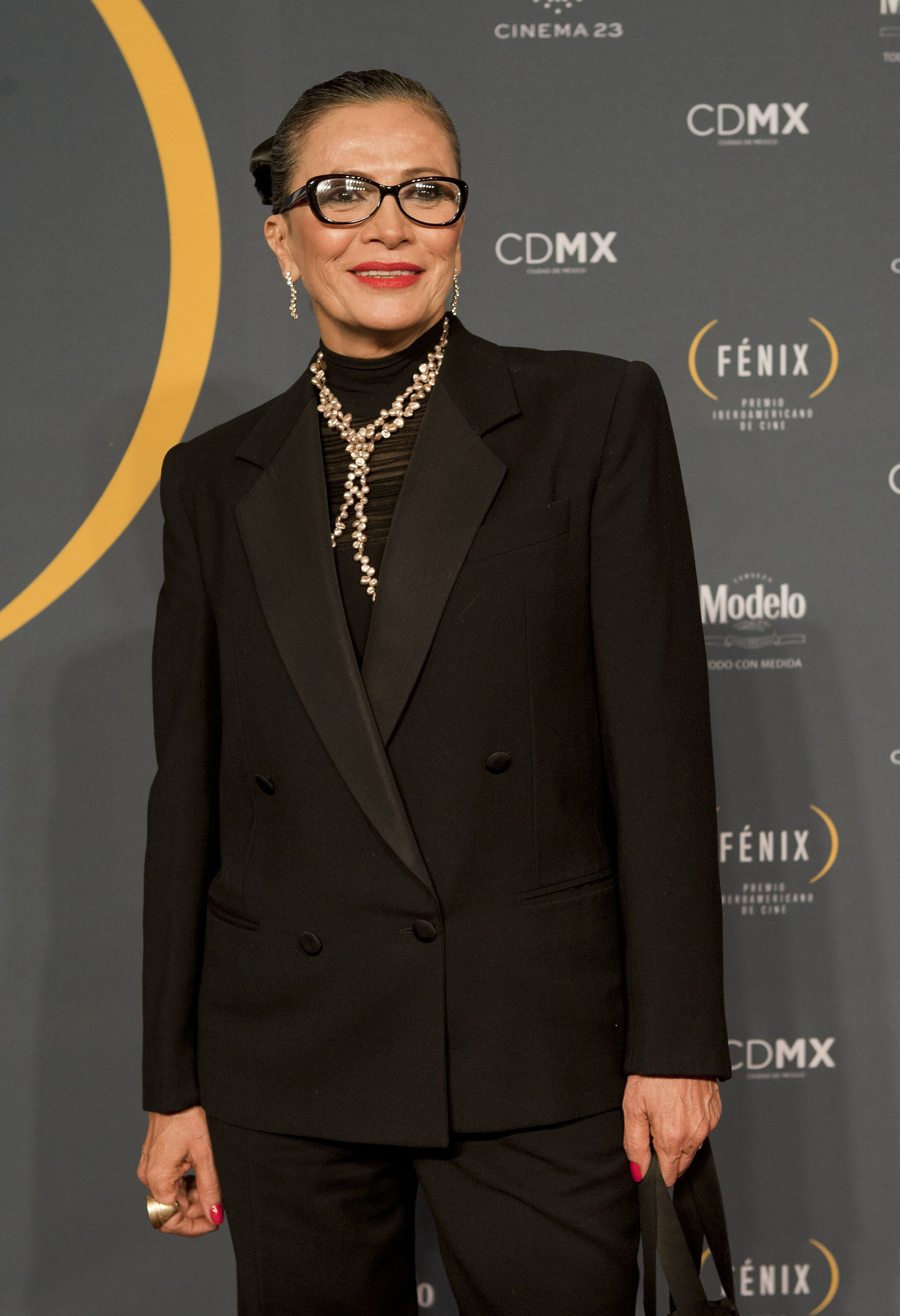
30 October 2014. Fenix Awards ceremony on Mexico City.

=== Films ===
Year	Title	Role	Notes
1974	El señor de Osanto		Film debut
1974	Llanto, risas y nocaut		
1975	La otra virginidad	Flora	
1975	La casa del Sur	María	
1976	México, México, ra, ra, ra		
1976	Actas de Marusia	Rosa	Ariel Award for Best Supporting Actress
1976	La venganza de un hombre llamado Caballo	Gray Thorn	
1976	Las poquianchis	Graciela	
1977	El elegido	Virgen Maria	
1977	Caminando pasos, caminando		
1977	Las cenizas del diputado	Ana Maria Godinez	
1977	Los iracundos		Short film
1978	Pedro Páramo	Eduviges Dyada	
1978	The Children of Sanchez	Paula's sister	
1979	México Norte		
1981	Ora sí tenemos que ganar		
1982	Retrato de una mujer casada	Luisa	
1985	Los motivos de Luz	Luz	Ariel Award for Best Actress; Mexican Cinema Journalists Award for Best Actress
1985	El rey de la vecindad	Esposa de Marcos	
1986	Va de Nuez		
1986	The Rebellion of the Hanged		
1987	Nocturno amor que te vas		
1987	Los confines	Esposa	Nominated — Ariel Award for Best Supporting Actress
1987	Asesinato en la plaza Garibaldi		
1988	La envidia		Short film
1988	El gran relajo mexicano		Ariel Award for Best Supporting Actress
1988	El otro crimen		
1989	La isla de las garzas		Short film
1989	Mentiras piadosas		
1989	Goitia, un dios para sí mismo		
1990	Espejismos y ceremonias		Short film
1991	Woman of the Port	Tomasa	
1992	Nocturno a Rosario	Soledad	
1992	Lucky Break		
1992	Golpe de suerte		
1993	¡Aquí espaantan!	Remedios	
1994	The Queen of the Night	Lucha Reyes	Ariel Award for Best Actress
1995	Mujeres insumisas	Ema	Nominated — Ariel Award for Best Actress
1996	Profundo carmesí	Sra. Ruelas	
1998	Noche de paz		Short film
1998	El evangelio de las Maravillas	Micaela	
1998	Fuera de la ley		
1999	El coronel no tiene quien le escriba	Jacinta	
1999	Del otro lado		
2000	Before Night Falls	María Teresa Freye de Andrade	
2000	Such Is Life	Adela, The Godmother	
2000	La perdición de los hombres	Axe Face	
2001	El sueño del caimán	Madre Caimán	
2002	Acosada	Licenciada Ortiz	
2002	eXXXorcismo		
2002	Frida	Matilde Kahlo	
2002	La virgen de la lujuria	Raquel	
2002	Solamente una vez		
2003	La mudanza	Sara	
2003	Popis	La abuela	Short film
2004	El edén	Victoria	
2005	Between	Mrs. Gonzalez	
2006	Mujeres en el Acto		
2006	El carnaval de Sodoma	Eréndira	
2007	Malos hábitos	Madre Superiora	
2008	Amor letra por letra	La Juez	
2008	El patio de mi cárcel	Aurora	
2008	Solo quiero caminar	Madre de Félix	
2008	Todos hemos pecado	La Doñita	
2009	El jardín que se seca	Estela	Short film
2009	Un mexicano más	Viuda	
2010	Chicogrande	La Sandoval	
2011	Chabela Querida	Chabela	Short film
2011	Las razones del corazón	Doña Ruti	
2014	Todos están muertos	Doña Rosario	
2015	Estar o no estar	Veronica	
2015	La teta de Botero	Sofa	
2015	El viaje de Keta	Elena	Nominated – Mexican Cinema Journalists Award for Best Supporting Actress
2015	Being or Not Being	Veronica	
2015	Bleak Street		
2018	Eres mi pasión	Madre Furia	
2018	A ti te quería encontrar	Lola	
2018	Mi Mariachi	Susana	
2019	Vagoneros	Covarrubias	
2019	Devil Between the Legs	Isabel	
2020	Ánima	Danae	

=== Television ===
Year	Title	Role	Notes
1982	Bianca Vidal	Cirila	Television debut
1983	El maleficio	Teodora	
1984	La traición	Lidia	
1985	Esperándote	Refugio	
1988	El extraño retorno de Diana Salazar	Jordana Nuñez	
1989	Hora marcada	Esperanza	Episode: "Noche de paz"
1989	Teresa	Josefina Martínez	TVyNovelas Award for Best Leading Actress
1990	En carne propia	Tota de Ortega	
1992	Triángulo	Virginia Granados	
1994	El vuelo del águila	Petrona Mori	TVyNovelas for Best Co-star Actress
1994–2004	Mujer, casos de la vida real	Various roles	6 episodes
1995	Azul	Martha	
1996	La antorcha encendida	Doña Juana de Foncerrada	
1997	María Isabel	Manuela	Nominated — TVyNovelas Award for Best Leading Actress
1997	La santa		Television film
1997	Pueblo chico, infierno grande	Martina	
1999	El niño que vino del mar	Alberta Gómez	
2001	La intrusa	Renata de Velarde	
2001	Salomé	Manola	Nominated — TVyNovelas Award for Best Leading Actress
2003	De pocas, pocas pulgas	Griselda	
2003–2004	Mariana de la noche	María Lola	Nominated — TVyNovelas Award for Best Leading Actress
2004	Inocente de ti	Clotilde	
2005	La madrastra	Venturina García	
2006	La fea más bella	Tomasa Mora	
2007	S.O.S.: Sexo y otros secretos	Invitada	"Recuerdos y secretos" (Season 1, Episode 6)
2007	Trece miedos	Vecina	"Nuevo comienzo" (Season 1, Episode 7)
2007	XHDRbZ	Mamá de Exelsa	"Los padres de Exelsa" (Season 1, Episode 16)
2008	Fuego en la sangre	Quintina	TVyNovelas for Best Co-star Actress
2008	Terminales	Abuela	"Verdades" (Season 1, Episode 3); "Transplantes" (Season 1, Episode 11)
2008–2010	Mujeres asesinas	Sagrario / Ernestina "Tita" Garza / Carmen	"Cándida, esperanzada" (Season 1, Episode 8); "Tita Garza, estafadora" (Season 2, Episode 6); "Las Cotuchas, Empresarias" (Season 3, Episode 14)
2009	Adictos		"Cocaina" (Season 1, Episode 20)
2010	Zacatillo, un lugar en tu corazón	Fredesvinda Carretas	
2010–2011	Los héroes del norte	Doña Olegaria	
2011	Rafaela	Caridad	118 episodes Nominated — TVyNovelas Award for Best Leading Actress
2014	El color de la pasión	Trinidad	38 episodes Nominated — TVyNovelas Award for Best Leading Actress
2015–2016	Fear the Walking Dead	Griselda Salazar	Season 1 (Recurring role; 4 episodes); Season 2 (Guest Star; 2 episodes)
2016	Un camino hacia el destino	Blanca Elizalde Contreras	103 episodes Nominated — TVyNovelas Award for Best Leading Actress
2018	Atrapada	Marcela	13 episodes
2019	La Reina del Sur	Carmen Martínez	23 episodes (season 2)
2020	La Doña	Florencia Molina	75 episodes (season 2)
2020	Imperio de mentiras	Sara Rodríguez de Velasco	
2023	Está libre	Concepción	
2024	La mujer de mi vida	Antonia de Oribe	
2025	Amanecer	Jovita Iglesias	
