= Los Motivos de Luz =

- Mexican theatrical release poster
- Directed by: Felipe Cazals
- Screenplay by: Xavier Robles
- Produced by: Hugo Scherer
- Starring: Patricia Reyes Spindola; Alonso Echánove; Ana Ofelia Murguía; Delia Casanova; Marta Aura
- Cinematography: Ángel Goded
- Edited by: Sigfrido García, Jr.
- Release date: 1985
- Running time: 96 minutes
- Country: Mexico
- Language: Spanish

Los Motivos de Luz (Luz' Motive) is a 1985 Mexican drama film, directed by Felipe Cazals. The film stars Patricia Reyes Spíndola, as Luz, a woman accused of murdering her four children, after being accused by her husband (Alonso Echánove) and her mother-in-law (Ana Ofelia Murguía). Los Motivos de Luz was written by Xavier Robles based on the real case of Elvia Luz Cruz. The film received two Ariel Awards in 1986, for Best Actress (Spindola) and Best Supporting Actress (Murguía).

== Main cast ==
- Patricia Reyes Spíndola as Luz
- Alonso Echánove as Sebastián
- Ana Ofelia Murguía as Luz Mother-in-law
- Delia Casanova as Dr. Maricarmen Rebollar
- Juan de la Loza as Husband of Maricarmen
- Marta Aura as Lawyer Marisela Alférez
- Dunia Saldívar as Neighbor inmate

== Awards ==
=== Ariel Awards ===
The Ariel Awards are awarded annually by the Mexican Academy of Film Arts and Sciences in Mexico. Los Motivos de Luz received two awards out of seven nominations.

Year	Nominee / work	Award	Result
28th Ariel Awards	Los Motivos de Luz	Best Picture	Nominated
28th Ariel Awards	Felipe Cazals	Best Director	Nominated
28th Ariel Awards	Alonso Echánove	Best Actor	Nominated
28th Ariel Awards	Patricia Reyes Spíndola	Best Actress	Won
28th Ariel Awards	Ana Ofelia Murguía	Best Supporting Actress	Won
28th Ariel Awards	Dunia Zaldívar	Best Supporting Actress	Nominated
28th Ariel Awards	Horacio Martínez	Best Art Direction	Nominated
