= La Víspera =

- Mexican theatrical release poster
- Directed by: Alejandro Pelayo
- Screenplay by: Alejandro Pelayo
- Produced by: Patricia Coronado
- Starring: Ernesto Gómez Cruz; María Rojo; Alfredo Sevilla; Ignacio Retes]; Salvador Sánchez; Ana Ofelia Murguía
- Cinematography: Federico Weingartshofer
- Edited by: Luis Kelly
- Music by: Ricardo Pérez; José Amozurrutia
- Release date: 1982
- Running time: 75 minutes
- Country: Mexico
- Language: Spanish

La Víspera (The Eve) is a 1982 Mexican political drama film, directed by Alejandro Pelayo. The film received four Ariel Awards in 1983: Best Actor (Ernesto Gómez Cruz), Best Supporting Actor (Alfredo Sevilla), Best Original Screenplay and Best First Feature Film. The film plot recount 24 hours before engineer Manuel Miranda (Ernesto Gómez Cruz) takes office as Secretary of State in Mexico.

== Main cast ==
- Ernesto Gómez Cruz and Ingeniero Manuel Miranda
- María Rojo as Margarita
- Alfredo Sevilla as Óscar Castelazo
- Ignacio Retes as Rubén Rocha
- Salvador Sánchez as Villegas
- Ana Ofelia Murguía as Irma

== Awards ==
=== Ariel Awards ===
The Ariel Awards are awarded annually by the Mexican Academy of Film Arts and Sciences in Mexico. In the 25th Ariel Awards, La Víspera received three awards out of five nominations.

Year	Award	Nominee	Result
1983	Best Actor	Ernesto Gómez Cruz	Won
1983	Best Actress	María Rojo	Nominated
1983	Best Supporting Actor	Alfredo Sevilla	Nominated
1983	Best Original Screenplay	Alejandro Pelayo	Won
1983	Best First Feature Film	Alejandro Pelayo	Won
