= Los lobos (film) =

- Poster
- Directed by: Samuel Kishi
- Written by: Samuel Kishi; Luis Briones; Sofía Gómez-Córdova
- Starring: Martha Reyes Arias; Maximiliano Nájar Márquez; Leonardo Nájar Márquez
- Music by: Kenji Kishi
- Release date: October 2019 (Busan)
- Country: Mexico
- Languages: Spanish; English

Los lobos (transl. 'The Wolves') is a 2019 Mexican family drama film directed by Samuel Kishi, and written by Kishi, Luis Briones, and Sofía Gómez-Córdova.

Los lobos is Kishi's second film, which is semi-autobiographical and partially based upon Kishi's own memories. It was nominated for 13 Ariel Awards, and won two: Ariel Award for Best Supporting Actress for Cici Lau, and Best Original Score for Kenji Kishi.

== Plot ==
The plot tells the story of Lucia (Martha Reyes Arias), who has just immigrated to Albuquerque, New Mexico with her sons Max (Maximiliano Nájar Márquez) and Leo (Leonardo Nájar Márquez), who are 8 and 5, respectively, who spend most of their time in their tiny apartment while their mother works.

It features dialogue in Spanish and English. The plot themes have been likened to those of The Florida Project.

== Cast ==
- Martha Reyes Arias as Lucía
- Maximiliano Nájar Márquez as Max
- Leonardo Nájar Márquez as Leo
- Cici Lau as señora Chang

== Release ==
The film premiered at the 24th Busan International Film Festival in October 2019 and went on to show at other festivals including the 70th Berlin International Film Festival.

== Reception ==
Review aggregator Rotten Tomatoes, reports a 92% of positive reviews, from a total of 12.

== Accolades ==
| Year | Award | Category | Nominee(s) | Result | Ref. |
|---|---|---|---|---|---|
| 2021 | 63rd Ariel Awards | Best Picture | | Nominated | |
| 2021 | 63rd Ariel Awards | Best Director | Samuel Kishi Leopo | Nominated | |
| 2021 | 63rd Ariel Awards | Best Actress | Martha Reyes Arias | Nominated | |
| 2021 | 63rd Ariel Awards | Best Supporting Actress | Cici Lau | Won | |
| 2021 | 63rd Ariel Awards | Best New Actor | Leonardo Nahim Nájar Márquez | Nominated | |
| 2021 | 63rd Ariel Awards | Best New Actor | Maximiliano Nájar Márquez | Nominated | |
| 2021 | 63rd Ariel Awards | Best Original Score | | Won | |
| 2021 | 63rd Ariel Awards | Best Costume Design | | Nominated | |
| 2021 | 63rd Ariel Awards | Best Art Design | | Nominated | |
| 2021 | 63rd Ariel Awards | Best Sound | | Nominated | |
| 2021 | 63rd Ariel Awards | Best Editing | | Nominated | |
| 2021 | 63rd Ariel Awards | Best Cinematography | | Nominated | |
| 2021 | 63rd Ariel Awards | Best Original Screenplay | | Nominated | |
| 2021 | 27th Forqué Awards | Best Latin-American Film | | Nominated | |
| 2022 | 36th Goya Awards | Best Ibero-American Film | | Nominated | |
