= Está libre =

- Genre: Sitcom
- Created by: Álvaro Curiel
- Directed by: Álvaro Curiel
- Starring: Patricia Reyes Spíndola; Ricardo Polanco; Italivi Orozco
- Composer: Víctor Hernández Stumphauser
- Country of origin: Mexico
- Original language: Spanish
- No. of seasons: 2
- No. of episodes: 24

Production
- Executive producers: Eduardo Suárez; Álvaro Curiel
- Producer: Yahir Vega
- Editor: Ana Alicia García Quiroz
- Production company: TelevisaUnivision

Original release
- Network: Las Estrellas
- Release: 5 October 2023 – 11 July 2024

Está libre is a Mexican sitcom television series created by Álvaro Curiel for TelevisaUnivision. It premiered on Las Estrellas on 5 October 2023. The series stars Patricia Reyes Spíndola, Ricardo Polanco, and Italivi Orozco. The second season premiered on 18 April 2024.

== Cast ==
- Patricia Reyes Spíndola as Concepción
- Ricardo Polanco as Chuy
- Italivi Orozco as Selene

== Episodes ==
=== Series overview ===
Series	Episodes	Originally released	
Series	Episodes	First released	Last released
1	12	5 October 2023	4 January 2024
2	12	18 April 2024	11 July 2024

=== Season 1 (2023–24) ===
No. overall	No. in season	Title	Original release date
1	1	"No es lo que me prometieron"	5 October 2023
Guest stars: Sebastián Rulli, José Luis Guarneros, María Prado
2	2	"¿Y cómo es él?"	12 October 2023
Guest stars: Mónica Huarte, Bárbara Torres, Carlos López "El Chevo", Jorge Losa, Nadia de la Rosa, Jean Paul Tardan
3	3	"Donde hubo fuego"	26 October 2023
Guest stars: Laura Zapata, Silvia Pasquel, Darío Ripoll, Jonnathan Kuri
4	4	"Noche de brujas"	2 November 2023
Guest stars: Sara Corrales, Leticia Perdigón, Pedro Romo, Araceli Ordaz "Gomita", Gaby Ramírez
5	5	"Confiscado"	9 November 2023
Guest stars: Hugo Alcántara, María Alicia Delgado, Fernando Larrañaga, Carmen Campuzano
6	6	"¿Ké tú quiere, mami?"	16 November 2023
Guest stars: Oswaldo Zárate, Daniel Tovar, Pierre Angelo, María Alicia Delgado, Jaime Rubiel
7	7	"La comadre tiene razón"	23 November 2023
Guest stars: Lupita Sandoval, Cristina Michaus
8	8	"Lotería"	7 December 2023
Guest stars: Anabel Ferreira, Jorge Aranda
9	9	"Cumpleaños"	14 December 2023
Guest stars: Eduardo Rubio, Roberto Tello, Martha Figueroa
10	10	"El último viaje"	21 December 2023
Guest stars: Jesús Ochoa, Jesusa Ochoa, Olivia Collins, Kimberly Irene, Paola Suárez, Fer Sagreeb
11	11	"Muñeco de porcelana"	28 December 2023
Guest stars: Harold Azuara, Nailea Norvind, René Casados, Mariazel Olle Casals, Borrego Nava, Natália Subtil
12	12	"El padrino"	4 January 2024
Guest stars: Joaquín Cosío, Bazzoka Joe

=== Season 2 (2024) ===
No. overall	No. in season	Title	Original release date
13	1	"Operación Socorro"	18 April 2024
14	2	"¿Qué ocupas?"	25 April 2024
15	3	"Doble o nada"	2 May 2024
16	4	"Acapulco en la azotea"	9 May 2024
17	5	"El empleado del mes"	23 May 2024
18	6	"El ticher"	30 May 2024
19	7	"La cabeza del águila"	6 June 2024
20	8	"¿Qué pasó anoche?"	13 June 2024
21	9	"El protagonista"	20 June 2024
22	10	"La Fan"	27 June 2024
23	11	"El Gurú"	4 July 2024
24	12	"El bailongo"	11 July 2024

== Awards and nominations ==
Year	Award	Category	Nominated	Result	Ref
2024	Produ Awards	Best Sitcom	Está libre	Nominated	
