= Ana Ofelia Murguía =

Mexican actress (1933–2023)

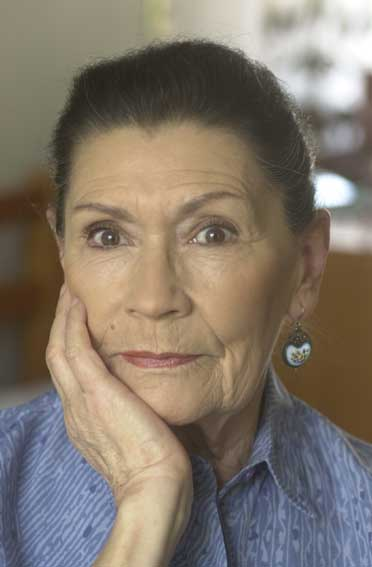
- Murguía in 2003
- Born: 8 December 1933; Mexico City, Mexico
- Died: 31 December 2023 (aged 90); Mexico City, Mexico
- Occupation: Actress
- Years active: 1968–2002; 2017

Ana Ofelia Murguía (8 December 1933 – 31 December 2023) was a Mexican actress. She was best known, in the English-speaking world, for voicing the titular character of the 2017 animated film Coco.

== Life ==
She was born in Mexico City. Her early well known roles were in The Queen of the Night (1994) as Doña Victoria and as Doña Amelia in Nobody Will Speak of Us When We're Dead (1995).

In later years, she was best known for voicing Mamá Coco in the 2017 Disney-Pixar animated movie Coco.

Murguía holds the record for the most nominations for the Ariel Award for Best Actress without a win, having been nominated a total of five times. She also jointly holds the record, with Isela Vega, for the most Ariel Award for Best Supporting Actress wins, with three; with a further three nominations.

Murguía died on 31 December 2023, at the age of 90, three weeks after her 90th birthday.

== Selected filmography ==
Year	Title	Role	Notes
2017	Coco	Mamá Coco	Voice (Final film role)
2002	La maceta		
2001	Otilia Rauda	Sirvienta	
2001	Pachito Rex, me voy pero no del todo	Rosa María	
2000	Escrito en el cuerpo de la noche	Dolores	
2000	Sexo por compasión	Vendedora de colmado	
2000	Su alteza serenísima		
1999	Ave María	Úrsula	
1998	Cruz		
1997	De noche vienes, Esmeralda (1997)	Doña Beatriz	
1996	El anzuelo	Doña Rosa	
1996	De muerte natural	Jovita	
1995	Nobody Will Speak of Us When We're Dead; Nadie hablará de nosotras cuando hayamos muerto	Doña Amelia	
1995	La tarde de un matrimonio de clase media	Esposa	
1994	Ámbar		
1994	The Queen of the Night; La reina de la noche	Doña Victoria, madre de Lucha	
1994	El jardín del edén	Juana	
1994	Luces de la noche		
1994	Morena	Vecina	
1992	Objetos perdidos	Vecina	
1991	Mi querido Tom Mix	Joaquina	
1991	One Man's War	Doña Teresa	
1991	Diplomatic Immunity; Immunidad diplomática	Mayán	
1988	Goitia, un dios para sí mismo		
1987	Gaby: A True Story; Gaby, una historia verdadera	Enfermera	
1987	Los confines	Madre de Natalia	
1985	Mexican, You Can Do It		
1985	Chido guan (Tacos de oro)	Doña Meche	
1985	Los Motivos de Luz	Mother-in-law of Luz	
1984	Dune	Sirvienta del palacio (uncredited)	
1984	La pasión de Isabela	Cristina	
1983	El corazón de la noche		
1982	La Víspera	Irma	
1979	María de mi corazón		
1978	Amor libre		
1978	Cadena perpetua	Esposa del señor Romero	
1977	Naufragio	Amparito	
1977	La viuda negra		
1976	Pedro Páramo; El hombre de la Media Luna	Damiana Cisneros	
1976	José		
1976	Las Poquianchis	Eva	
1975	The Heist; El apando	Celadora	
1975	Esa es mi Irene		
1972	El profeta Mimí		
1970	Para servir a usted		
1968	Pax?		
