= The Heist (1976 film) =

- Directed by: Felipe Cazals
- Written by: José Agustín; José Revueltas
- Produced by: Héctor López; Fernando Macotela
- Starring: Salvador Sánchez; José Carlos Ruiz; Manuel Ojeda
- Cinematography: Álex Phillips Jr.
- Edited by: Rafael Castanedo
- Music by: Gonzalo Curiel
- Production company: Conacite Uno
- Distributed by: Conacite Uno
- Release date: 5 August 1976
- Running time: 83 minutes
- Country: Mexico
- Language: Spanish

The Heist (Spanish:El apando) is a 1976 Mexican crime film directed by Felipe Cazals and starring Salvador Sánchez, José Carlos Ruiz and Manuel Ojeda.

== Cast ==
- Salvador Sánchez as Albino
- José Carlos Ruiz as El Carajo
- Manuel Ojeda as Polonio
- Delia Casanova as La Chata
- María Rojo as Meche
- Álvaro Carcaño as Teniente
- Luz Cortázar as madre del Carajo
- Ana Ofelia Murguía as Celadora
- Sergio Calderón as Oficial
- César Sobrevals as Celador
- Gerardo del Castillo as Policía
- Adriana Rojo
- Tomás Pérez Turrent as Preso de la fajina
- Max Kerlow as Preso del suéter amarillo
- Roberto Rivero
- Pedro Montaño
- María Barber
- Carlos Cardán
- Samuel Moreno as Policía
- Guillermo Gil as Policia

== Bibliography ==
- Mora, Carl J. Mexican Cinema: Reflections of a Society, 1896-2004. McFarland & Co, 2005.
