= Terror and Black Lace =

- Directed by: Luis Alcoriza
- Screenplay by: Luis Alcoriza
- Story by: Ramón Obón
- Starring: Gonzalo Vega; Maribel Guardia
- Cinematography: Xavier Cruz
- Edited by: Federico Landeros
- Music by: José Antonio Alcaraz; Pedro Plascencia
- Production company: Instituto Mexicano de Cinematografía
- Release date: August 28, 1986
- Running time: 97 minutes
- Country: Mexico
- Language: Spanish

Terror and Black Lace (Spanish: Terror y encajes negros) is a 1986 Mexican film directed by Luis Alcoriza. The film revolves around a serial killer.
