= The Good Girls (film) =

2018 film

- Directed by: Alejandra Márquez Abella
- Produced by: Gabriela Maire
- Starring: Ilse Salas; Flavio Medina
- Release dates: 9 September 2018 (TIFF); 22 March 2019 (Mexico)
- Running time: 93 minutes
- Country: Mexico
- Language: Spanish

The Good Girls (Spanish: Las niñas bien) is a 2018 Mexican drama film directed by Alejandra Márquez Abella.

== Cast ==
- Ilse Salas – Sofía
- Flavio Medina – Fernando
- Cassandra Ciangherotti – Alejandra
- Paulina Gaitán – Ana Paula
