= Las Poquianchis (film) =

1976 film by Felipe Cazals

- Directed by: Felipe Cazals
- Written by: Tomás Pérez Turrent; Xavi Robles
- Starring: Ana Ofelia Murguía; Leonor Llausás; Malena Doria; Diana Bracho; Jorge Martínez de Hoyos
- Cinematography: Álex Phillips Jr.
- Edited by: Rafael Castanedo
- Release date: 25 November 1976 (Mexico)
- Running time: 110 minutes
- Country: Mexico
- Language: Spanish

Las Poquianchis (De los pormenores y otros sucedidos del dominio público que acontecieron a las hermanas de triste memoria a quienes la maledicencia así las bautizó), or simply Las Poquianchis, is a 1976 crime drama film directed by Felipe Cazals, and written by Tomás Pérez Turrent, and Xavier Robles. The film is inspired by the case of the sisters Delfina and María de Jesús González, better known as "Las Poquianchis". It stars Ana Ofelia Murguía, Leonor Llausás, and Malena Doria as Las Poquianchis, along with Diana Bracho, Tina Romero, and Jorge Martínez de Hoyos.

== Plot ==
Eva (Ana Ofelia Murguía), Delfa (Leonor Llausás) and Chuy (Malena Doria) are three sisters who seek to make a living in an easy way, so they take advantage of the poverty of various rural families and the innocence of the women, and then sell them false illusions. That is why they decide to go with Mr. Rosario (Jorge Martínez de Hoyos) to buy their daughters María (Tina Romero) and Adelina (Diana Bracho) with the deception of taking them to work in a restaurant; However, the truth is that they will be used as prostitutes who will be raped day and night without receiving anything in return other than a worse treatment than if they were beasts.
