= List of Moldovan films =

This is a list of Moldovan films.

== Titles ==
Title	Director	Release Date	Genre
All God's Children (Toti copiii domnului)	Adrian Popovici	2012	Drama
Angel Geminii	Octavian Grigoriu	1997	TV film
Carbon	Ion Borș	2022	Comedy-drama
Chuchelo		1992	
Danila Prepeleac		1996	
Dezertir		1997	
Dnestrovskiye melodii		1973	Musical
Dolina schastya		1993	
The Gypsy Baron	Anthony Jacobson	2014	Documentary
Lăutarii	Emil Loteanu	1972	Drama
Mamaliga Blues	Cassio Tolpolar	5 May 2014 (USA)	Documentary
Moldawien – Ein vergessenes Land		2003	TV film
Patul lui Procust		2001	
Peace Near the River	Vitaly Gareev	1 September 2014 (Moldova)	Documentary
Porter & Co.	Collin Kriner		Documentary
Rikoshet		1997	
Sweet Dreams		2000	
The Unsaved (La limita de jos a cerului)	Igor Cobileanski	2013	Drama
Vinovata li ya...		1992	
Vodovorot		1992	
Welcome to Gagauzia	Vasili Vikhliaev	10 May 2014 (Germany)	Documentary
What a Wonderful World (Ce Lume Minunată)	Anatol Durbală	4 April 2014 (Moldova)	Drama
Where Has Love Gone? (Gde ty, lyubov?)	Valeriu Gagiu	1980	Drama
The Wooden Cannon (Tunul de lemn)	Vasile Brescanu	1986	Drama

== See also ==
- Cinema of Moldova
- List of Moldovan submissions for the Academy Award for Best Foreign Language Film
