= Cinema of Moldova =

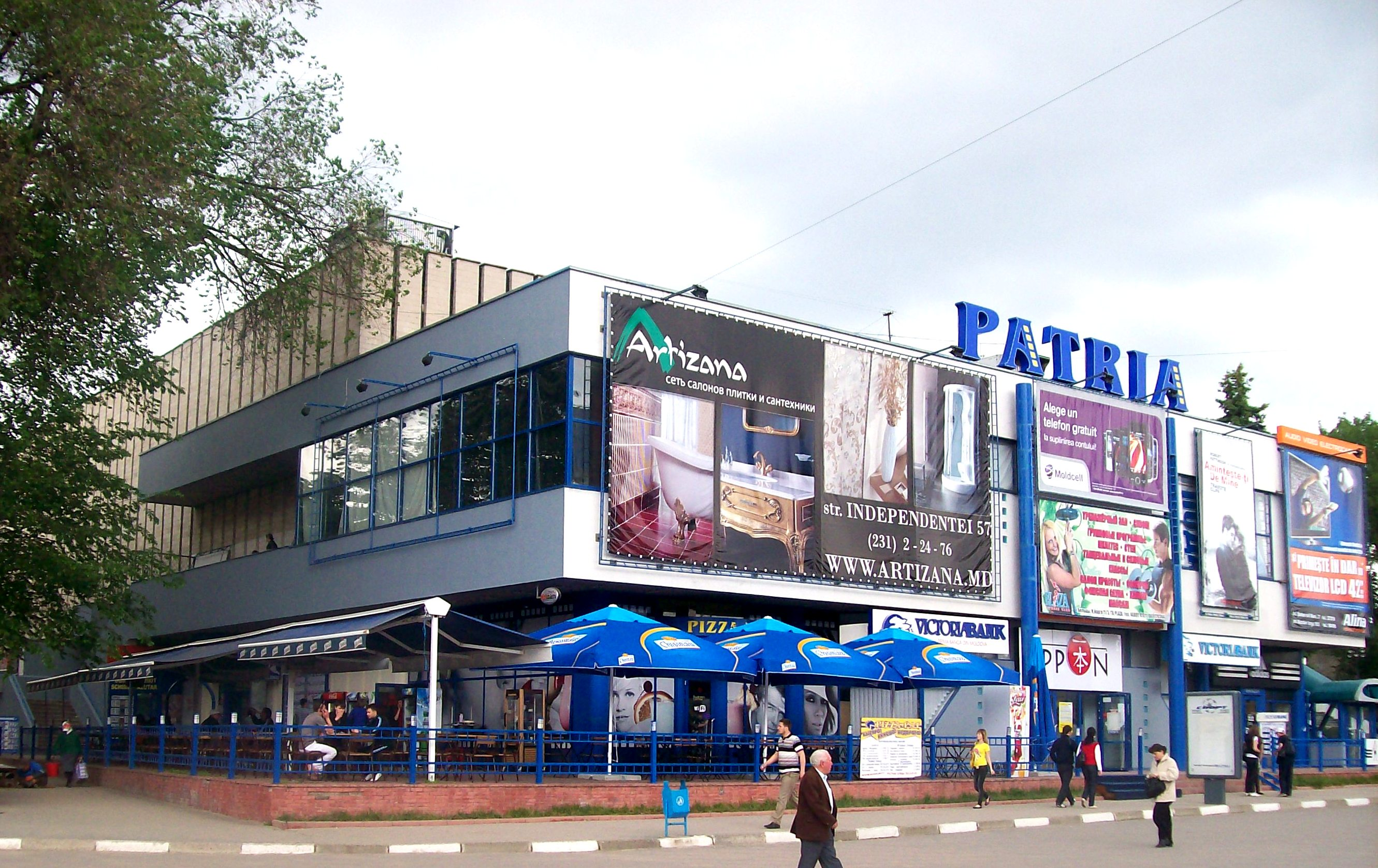
- Cinema Patria Bălți
- No. of screens: 29 (2011)
  - Per capita: 0.9 per 100,000 (2011)
- Main distributors: Colaj; Elatrentservice; Gaudeamus Cinema

Produced feature films (2009)
- Fictional: 1
- Animated: -
- Documentary: -

Number of admissions (2012)
- Total: 598,000
  - Per capita: 0.168

Gross box office (2006)
- Total: MDL 10 million

The cinema of Moldova developed in the early 1960s during the Soviet period, experiencing a flowering of about a decade and a half. Stagnation followed, and after the Moldavian SSR became independent in 1991, the industry almost completely disappeared.

== History ==
1897-1939

The beginnings of Moldovan cinema are difficult to trace, owing largely to the divergent cinematic histories of the left- and right-bank regions, a division which continues today. From 1897 to 1927, film production in Moldova was sparse and remains mostly undocumented. After Bessarabia, now part of Moldova’s current territorial boundaries, was absorbed into Romania in 1918, the USSR created the Moldavian Autonomous Soviet Socialist Republic (MASSR) on the left bank of the Dniester River in 1924. This newly created Soviet republic included land taken from Ukraine as well as modern-day Transnistria, a breakaway region that remains unrecognized by any UN-member nations. At that time, the USSR attempted to modernize and Sovietize the MASSR, which included cryrillicizing the Romanian language, industrializing the region, and educating many of the MASSR’s film professionals at the Odessa State College of Cinematography in neighboring Ukraine.

Most of the films produced by these early Moldovan film professions were documentary works, most of which were propaganda films, such as Protest Rally: Remember Bessarabia (1928), The Bessarabian Agricultural Community (1928), and Five Years of the MASSR (1928). However, the 1928 documentary Everything is Quiet is the most noteworthy film from this period and included an entirely Moldovan film crew.

Despite these efforts, the region never had its own national film studio. Throughout the MASSR’s existence, the Moldovan film industry and Ukrainian film industry were almost one and the same: in 1930, the USSR created the Moldovan cinematography department at UkraFilm, which change its title in 1934 and, again, in 1936. Additionally, many film workers involved with these early MASSR productions were Ukrainian.

1939-1952

In the right-bank region, filmmaking in Bessarabia was virtually nonexistent since its cinematic identity was bound up with that of Romania’s, which, due to devastation occasioned by World War I, was progressing at a modest pace. After the Molotov–Ribbentrop Pact in 1939, which effectively ceded Bessarabia to the USSR, the Soviet army invaded Bessarabia and took control of the region. From 1940 to 1944, Bessarabia experienced its biggest in the field of cinema since 1918. Several Russian-language films were subtitled in the Romanian language, and Soviet filmmakers began producing documentaries and newsreels about the region, such as On the Danube.

This cinematic growth came to an end, though, when Nazi Germany and Romania, which had recently aligned itself with the Axis Powers, moved into Bessarabia and crossed the Dniester River into modern day Transnistria. Afterwards, all soviet republics’ film industries were enlisted into the war effort and, like the film industries of the Allied Powers, produced documentaries and newsreels about the USSR’s military activities.

After the USSR recaptured Bessarabia and Transnistria, both regions were devastated by the war. Chişinău, the capital city of Moldova, was almost entirely destroyed from the bombing campaigns. But the Bessarabian region also faced additional hurdles, as noted by Leonid Brezhnev: Because it was not part of the USSR during the 1920s, Bassarabia remained undeveloped in comparison with its Soviet counterparts. Hence, rapid collectivization and sovietization followed the Second World War. Although there were efforts to cultivate a Moldovan film culture in this period—Russian-language films continued to be subtitled in Romanian, the government published soviet newsreels focusing on Moldova, etc.—the cinematic situation remained stagnant until the 1950s.

1952-1970

On April 26, 1952, after much planning, the USSR Ministry of Cinematography created the Documentary Film Studio in Chişinău. During the first year two documentaries, Kodry and Moldovan Cannery appeared. However, these films, like those of the MASSR, lacked a distinctly Moldovan identity. The directors working in Moldova at this point were from Moscow and Odessa, in part because there were no trained Moldovan film professionals. Between 1952 and 1957, six documentaries were screened.

Afterwards, more Moldovan filmmakers began to participate in local productions, which caused the MSSR to take an increased interest in the state's role in developing a national film culture. To that end, on January 24, 1957, the MSSR Council of Ministers renamed the national film studio the "Studio for Fiction Movies and Chronicle Documentaries from Chişinău," also known as "Moldova-Film". Moldova-Film was far more productive than its predecessor. Funded by the State, Moldova-Film turned out 160 feature films, 1,500 documentaries and educational shorts, and over 100 animated films between 1957 and 1992. A few years later, in 1967, the MSSR founded Telefilm Chișinău, which, like Moldova-Film, received state funding and was similarly productive, producing over 300 documentaries, music videos, and telefilms during its existence.

It was during this period that many notable Moldovan filmmakers began receiving training at VGIK in Moscow and returning to Moldova to shoot films in their home country. This allowed Moldovan cinema to develop a distinct identity. During Khruschev's thaw, which ushered increased liberties in artistic expression, Moldovan filmmakers such as Emil Loteanu and Valeriu Gagiu produced films which comprised the “Moldovan Poetic Film,” a genre which fused realism with romance and enjoyed wide appeal in the USSR.

However, as in the rest of the Soviet republics, the state exercised a considerable influence in the content of these films, and with the rise of Leonid Brezhnev as First Secretary came a resurgence of official censorship. Socialist Realism, once de rigueur under Stalin’s leadership, became, again, the artistic model for film professions; and critiques of Soviet history were vehemently disfavored by party leaders. For instance, Valeriu Gagiu’s A Taste of Bread (1966), about Moldovan resistance during Stalin’s tight-fisted agricultural collectivization policies after the Second World War, elicited outrage from party leaders, despite the film’s enthusiastic reception at film festivals. Hence, in keeping with the state’s systematic suppression of Moldovan cinema and culture, the Central Committee of the Moldovan Communist Party banned the film in 1970. Other Moldovan films suffered similar fates.

1970-1990

During the post-Thaw era of the 1970s, characterized by stagnation, studios continued to curtail artistic freedoms, though there were a few artistic successes at this time, such as Emil Loteanu’s Lăutarii (1972) and Gypsies Are Found near Heaven (1976). But by the 1980s, perestroika and glasnost occasioned a resurgence of artistic freedom and impressive Moldovan films, like Valeriu Jereghi’s Iona (1987), Gheorghe Urschi’s Whoever Swears, He Pays (1989), and Victor Bucătaru’s Crucifix (1990).

From Independence to the Present After the dissolution of the Soviet Union in 1991 and the transition to a market economy, Moldova’s film industry faced significant challenges. Directors and producers, many of whom were graduates of Gerasimov Institute of Cinematography in Moscow, found themselves without state-organized productions. Moldova-Film studio struggled to adapt, and most of its staff had to pursue other professions. Over the next three decades, the studio produced only three fiction feature films: Patul lui Procust (2001), Jana (2004), and Lupii și Zeii (2009).

In the early 1990s, directors Vlad Druc and Mircea Chistruga created two parable films, Cheamă-i, Doamne înapoi and Mâine iar va răsări soarele. Around the same time, a series of documentaries highlighting historical figures such as Dimitrie Cantemir, Ștefan cel Mare, and Mihai Eminescu were also produced, reflecting a focus on national identity during a period of transition.

The 1990s also saw the emergence of private film studios, which adapted more easily to the market economy. These studios produced short films, documentaries, and other audiovisual works independently. The first feature-length fiction film produced without state funding was Nunta în Basarabia (2010), a Moldova–Romania–Luxembourg co-production led by OWH Studio.

In 2022, the film Carbon premiered, achieving unprecedented success both locally and internationally. As of 2024, it remains the most successful Moldovan film.

=== Filmography ===
In 1957, the first fiction comedy film was called Cînd omul nu-i la locul lui (When the man is not himself) after a script written by Ion Druta.

In 1968, the first cartoon film, The Goat with Three Kids, was released, a film inspired by Ion Creanga's fairy-tale with the same title. In 1972, the satirical series Usturici appeared.

Between 1952 and 1982, 120 fiction movies, 800 documentaries, 750 editions of the cinema magazine Soviet Moldova, 40 editions of Usturici and 40 cartoons were filmed at the Moldova-Film studio. It also dubbed 12 fiction movies and 70 short stories annually by the end of the 1980s.

A cinema was built in the beginning of the 1950s in the center of Chişinău, which is now part of the Moldovan "Patria" chain.

== International recognition ==
The first internationally acclaimed success was the film of Moldovan producer Mihail Kalik - Lullaby (Russian: Колыбельная), released in 1960 at Moldova-Film studios. The movie was awarded the "Prize for Participation" at the international cinema competition at the Locarno International Film Festival, bringing attention to the emergent Moldovan film industry.

Another international success was Man Is Walking After the Sun (Man Is Following the Sun Russian: Человек идет за солнцем), written by Valeriu Gagiu and Mihail Kalik. The world press compared this movie to the Albert Lamorisse movie Le Ballon Rouge, where, just as in the Moldovan movie, the main hero was a little boy. Vadim Derbenev, the cameraman, was awarded the special jury diploma at the International Cinema Festival in Helsinki for his work.

Another one of the first Moldovan films was the Ataman of Codru (Russian: Атаман кодр), which enjoyed success in Asia and Latin America. The viewers called the movie Ataman Kadyr.

The Moldovan breakthrough in the world's cinema industry was a film written by Ion Druţă and producer and cameraman Vadim Derbenev - Last Month of Autumn (Russian: Последний месяц осени). The film received prizes at the Mar del Plata Film Festival, including the "Sympathy Prize of Viewers". Evgueniy Lebedev was awarded the main prize of the festival - the "Big Southern Cross" - in the best male role nomination. La Nación described the film as a "remarkably beautiful work". La Prensa wrote "This film, amongst all the mess that flooded the cinema world invites us to the sources of the true reachess of life". Besides appraisal in Argentina, the movie was awarded the Grand Prix at the Cannes Film Festival in 1966. At the International Film Festival Kino Pavasaris in Vilnius, the director Vadim Derbenev won "Best Production". However, in Vilnius, the film was awarded only the second main film prize, the first place being taken by Vytautas Žalakevičius's film Nobody Wanted to Die (Russian: Никто не хотел умирать).

Lăutarii by Emil Loteanu (producer Vitaliy Kalashnikov, composer Eugen Doga) was a success, particularly in Italy. The movie received four prizes, including the "Prize of Viewers' Sympathy" and the second main prize "Silver Shell". Norwegian newspaper Arbeiterbladet compared the Moldovan movie to the Broadway musical The Sound of Music. Czech weekly Film a Divadlo wrote "Every nation expresses to the best its deepest feelings, but the Moldovan one did it the best". In 1975, the movie won in the category of "Best Foreign Film", leaving behind traditional Hollywood productions. During the week of Soviet Cinema in Naples, the film was awarded the "Silver Nymph".

Red Meadows by Emil Loteanu was also another major Moldovan success at the Locarno International Film Festival. România Liberă highlighted the symbolism of this art work, which made it an unforgettable sight".

Very few films have been made in Moldova since independence: the government has failed to protect its domestic industry and funding is rare (save for occasional co-productions). The country also has the world's second-lowest cinema attendance rate.

== Cartoons ==
The animation movies produced at Moldova-Studios reach an international audience. The cartoon Haiduc, produced by Leonid Gorokhov and Yuriy Katsap, with scenario written by Vlad Druc, was awarded the Grand-Prix of the Cannes Film Festival in the cartoon category.

== Personalities ==
The top Soviet pop star Sofia Rotaru starred in the musical movie filmed at Moldova-Film studios called Dnestrovskiye melodiy.

== See also ==
- List of Moldovan films
- Media of Moldova
- Cinema of the world
