= Diego Quemada-Diez =

Spanish-born Mexican film director

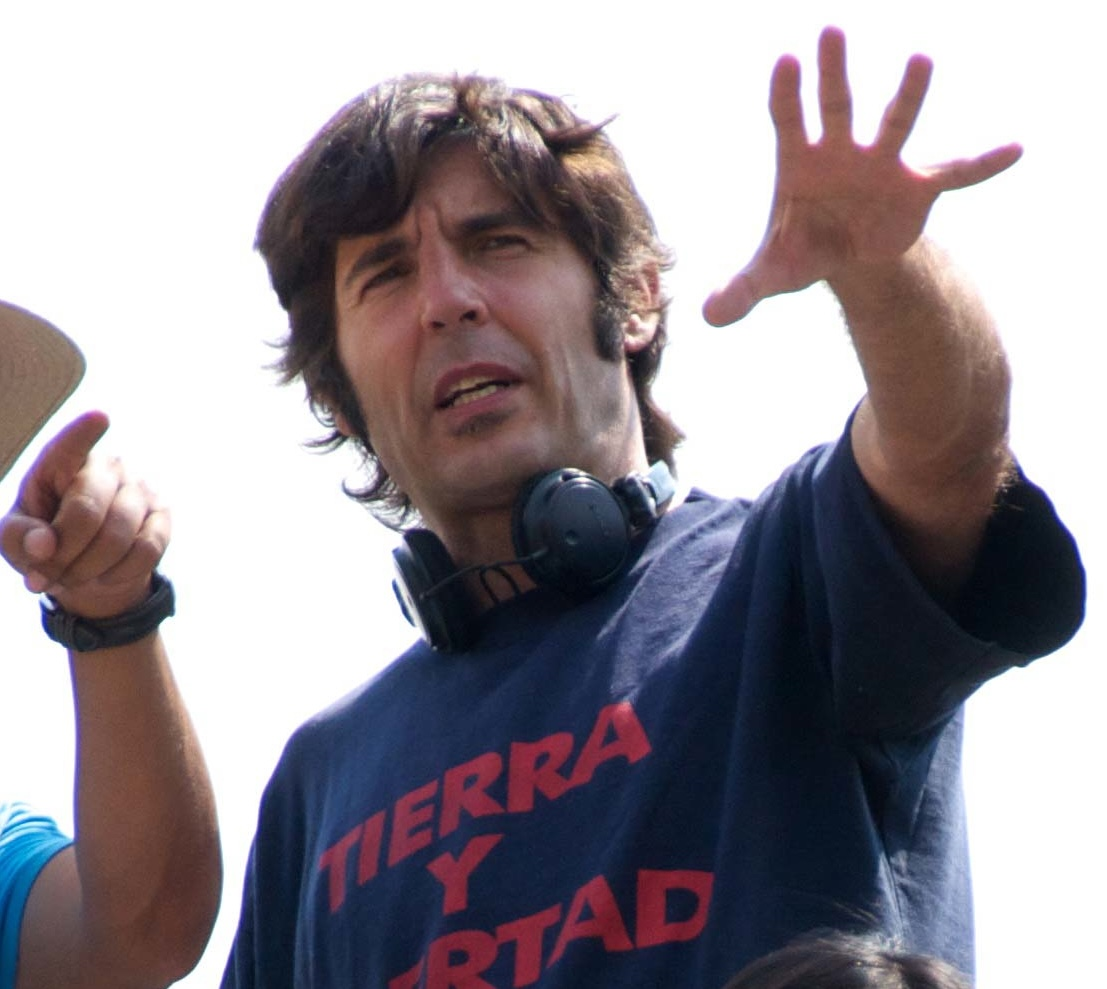
- Diego Quemada-Diez shooting The Golden Dream
- Occupation: Film director - screenwriter - cinematographer - producer
- Years active: 1994-present

Diego Quemada-Diez (born in Burgos, Spain) is a Spanish-born Mexican film director, screenwriter, cinematographer, and producer. He is best known for his debut feature La jaula de Oro (The Golden Dream, 2013). The film premiered in the Un Certain Regard section of the Cannes Film Festival, where it won three distinctions, including the Un Certain Talent Award, the Gillo Pontecorvo Award, and the François Chalais Special Mention Award. Following its success, La Jaula de Oro earned over 80 national and international awards, including nine Ariel Awards from the Mexican Film Academy.

== Early life ==
Quemada-Diez was born in Burgos, Spain. His parents separated when he was eight years old, after which he moved with his mother to Barcelona. His mother was a schoolteacher with an interest in the arts and progressive politics, and she frequently travelled to Guatemala and Mexico, where she had connections to missionaries associated with Liberation Theology. He has credited her influence as formative to his social and artistic outlook.

As a child he attended a progressive art school and developed an interest in painting, drawing, and writing. He has cited Shane (George Stevens, 1953) as the film that first inspired him to pursue filmmaking. Without access to film school in Spain or industry connections, he began working as a production runner on commercial productions in Barcelona, eventually rising to production coordinator under director Isabel Coixet.

At the age of 17, following his mother's death, he moved to Mexico, where he sought opportunities and pursue his ambition of becoming a film director. He later relocated to Los Angeles, where he studied cinematography at the American Film Institute on a scholarship, and graduated with a short film, A Table Is a Table (2001).

== Career ==
=== Early career and collaboration with Ken Loach ===
Quemada-Diez began his career as a camera assistant on Ken Loach's Land and Freedom (1995), a drama based on Homage to Catalonia by George Orwell. He went on to work with Loach on two further films: Carla's Song (1996) and Bread and Roses (2000). Loach's filmmaking approach significantly influenced Quemada-Diez, particularly his methods of filming in narrative sequence, keeping actors unaware of upcoming plot developments, maintaining the camera at eye level, and working with non-professional actors in real locations. He has cited these principles as central to his own directorial practice.

=== Work as a camera operator ===
In the late 1990s and 2000s, Quemada-Diez worked as a camera operator across multiple feature productions. His credits during this period include Any Given Sunday (Oliver Stone), 21 Grams (Alejandro González Iñárritu), Man on Fire (Tony Scott), Constant Gardener (Fernando Meirelles), and She Hate Me (Spike Lee).

=== Short films ===
Alongside his camera work in the film industry, Quemada-Diez directed several short films. His AFI graduation film A Table Is a Table (2001) won the ASC Award for Best Cinematography and was showcased at the 2002 Cannes Film Festival.

His second short, I Want to Be a Pilot (2006), was developed from testimonies gathered from orphaned children at the Raila Educational Center in Kibera, Kenya, while Quemada-Diez was working as a camera operator on The Constant Gardener, a Fernando Meirelles' film based on the novel by John Le Carre. The film premiered at the Sundance Film Festival and received awards.

In 2006, he also directed the documentary short La Morena, which competed in the official selection of the Morelia International Film Festival.

=== La jaula de oro (2013) ===
In 2002, while making a documentary in Mazatlán, Sinaloa, Quemada-Diez began a multi-year research process, interviewing migrants traveling through Mexico on freight trains. Over the course of six years, he conducted more than 600 interviews, compiling what he described as a "collective testimony" of the migrant experience. He relocated to Mexico City around 2007 to concentrate full-time on the project.

In 2010, he received a Cinéfondation grant from the Cannes Film Festival to participate in L'Atelier, which provided support for the development of the feature. The film was co-written with Gibran Portela and Lucía Carreras and produced by Quemada-Diez's company, Kinemascope Films, in partnership with Machete and Animal de Luz.

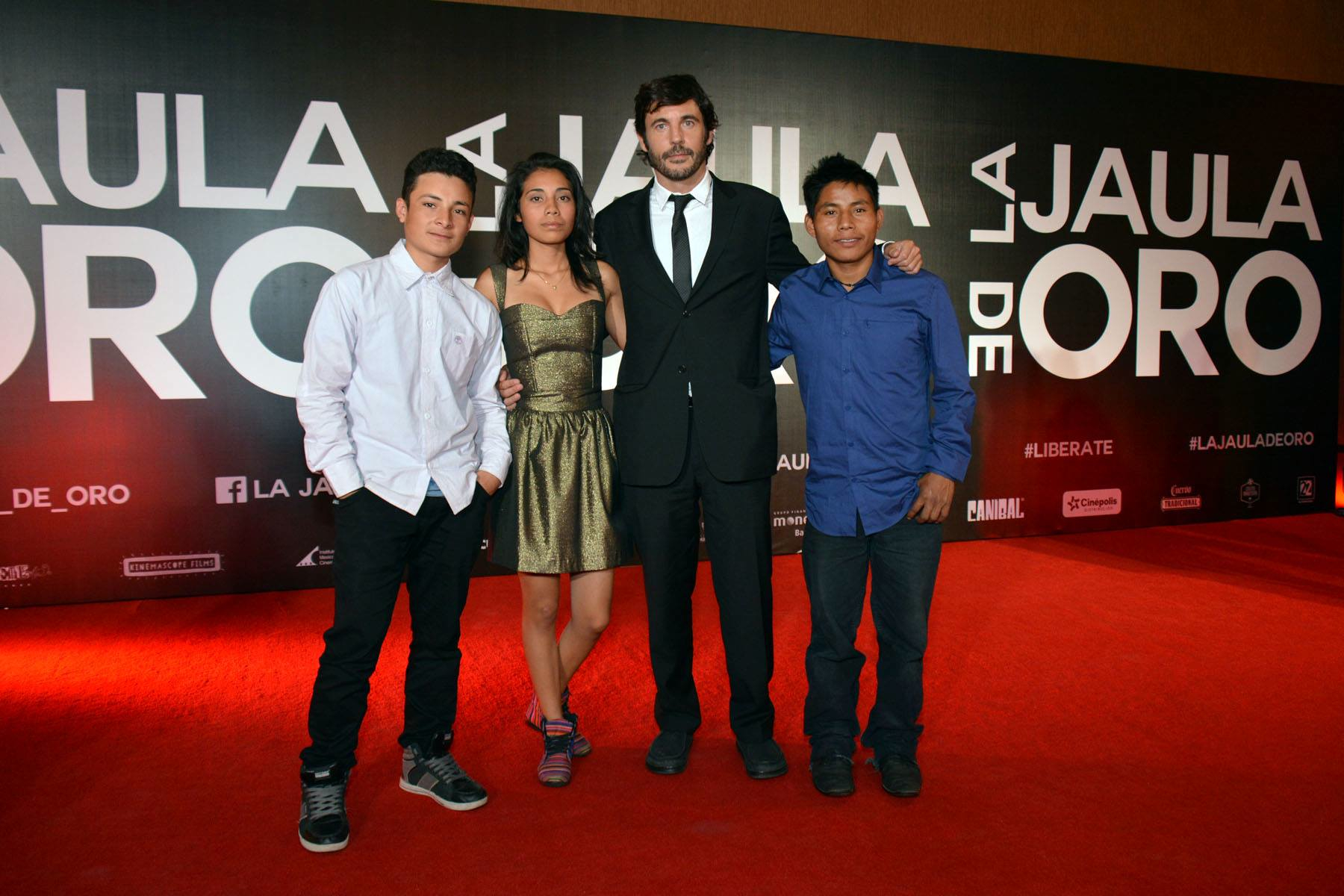
Brandon Lopez, Karen Martinez, Diego Quemada-Diez, Rodolfo Dominguez at La Jaula de Oro premiere in Mexico city

The film premiered at the 2013 Cannes Film Festival in the Un Certain Regard section, where it won three awards. It later received nine Ariel Awards from the Mexican Film Academy, the Best Ibero-American Film at the first Fenix Awards, the Best First Mexican Feature Film Award at the Morelia Film Festival, the Golden Gateway Of India award in the Mumbai Film Festival, the Best International Feature Film at the Zurich Film Festival, and the Satyajit Ray Foundation's Director of the Year award, among many other accolades.

The film was also selected as one of the favorite films of Ken Loach.

== Filmography ==
=== As director ===
Year	Title	Type	Awards	Notes
2001	A Table is a Table (Una mesa es una mesa)	Short film	9	AFI graduation
2006	I Want to Be a Pilot (Quiero ser piloto)	Short film	50+	Premiered at Sundance FF, Locarno FF, Telluride FF, Sao Paulo IFF
2006	La Morena	Short documentary	-	Competed at Morelia International Film Festival
2013	La jaula de oro (The Golden Dream)	Feature film	80+	Premiered at Cannes FF (Un Certain Regard), London IFF, Karlovy Vary IFF, Busan IFF, and others.

=== Other selected credits ===
Before directing his first feature film, Quemada-Diez worked in camera departments on films by directors including Ken Loach, Isabel Coixet, Oliver Stone, Alejandro González Iñárritu, Tony Scott, Spike Lee, Fernando Meirelles and Joel Schumacher.

Year	Film	Director	Role
1995	Land and Freedom	Ken Loach	Clapper loader
1996	Carla's Song	Ken Loach	Assistant camera
1996	Things I Never Told You	Isabel Coixet	Camera department
1999	Any Given Sunday	Oliver Stone	Camera operator
2000	Bread and Roses	Ken Loach	Assistant camera
2003	21 Grams	Alejandro González Iñárritu	Camera operator
2004	Man on Fire	Tony Scott	Camera operator
2004	She Hate Me	Spike Lee	Camera operator
2005	The Constant Gardener	Fernando Meirelles	Camera operator
2007	The Number 23	Joel Schumacher	Camera department
2008	The Elephant King	Seth Grossman	Cinematographer

== Personal life ==
Quemada-Diez is a naturalized Mexican citizen. After years of working in the United States and learning from his mentors in the film industry, he decided to settle in Mexico, where he focuses on telling stories that resonate with the migrant experience and address social issues affecting Latin America. He is also a member of various film organizations, including the Mexican Academy of Cinematographic Arts and Sciences (AMACC).

== Awards and recognition ==
Quemada-Diez received a cinematography award from the American Society of Cinematographers for his AFI graduation film, A Table Is a Table. His short film I Want to Be a Pilot subsequently received international recognition, including the Audience Award at the São Paulo International Film Festival and a Special Jury Mention at the Amiens International Film Festival.

His feature debut, La jaula de oro, received awards and nominations at several international film festivals. Where a distinction was presented to the film, its screenplay or its cast rather than to Quemada-Diez personally, this is specified below.

Selected awards and nominations
Year	Awarding body	Award or nomination	Work
2008	Latin American Poetic Short Film Festival	Best Director	I Want to Be a Pilot
2013	2013 Cannes Film Festival — Un Certain Regard	A Certain Talent Prize — ensemble cast	La jaula de oro
2013	Thessaloniki International Film Festival	Golden Alexander — awarded to the film	La jaula de oro
2013	Thessaloniki International Film Festival	Best Director	La jaula de oro
2013	Pacific Meridian International Film Festival, Vladivostok	Best Director	La jaula de oro
2013	São Paulo International Film Festival	Special Mention — New Directors	La jaula de oro
2013	Fine Arts International Film Festival	Best Director	La jaula de oro
2013	Chicago International Film Festival	Gold Hugo — New Directors Competition, awarded to the film	La jaula de oro
2013	Mar del Plata International Film Festival	Golden Astor for Best Feature Film	La jaula de oro
2014	French Ministry of National Education	Prix Jean Renoir des lycéens — awarded to the film	La jaula de oro
2014	Havana Film Festival New York	Best Director	La jaula de oro
2014	56th Ariel Awards	Best Original Screenplay — with Gibrán Portela and Lucía Carreras	La jaula de oro
2014	56th Ariel Awards	Nomination — Best Director	La jaula de oro
2014	Satyajit Ray Foundation	Satyajit Ray Award for Best Director	La jaula de oro
2014	28th Goya Awards	Nomination — Best Ibero-American Film	La jaula de oro
2014	Calanda International Film Festival	Best Direction	La jaula de oro
2014	Fénix Awards	Best Fiction Feature — awarded to the film	La jaula de oro
2015	ACE Awards	Best Director	La jaula de oro

== See also ==
- Cannes Film Festival
- Morelia Film Festival
- Ariel Awards
- Mexican Academy of Cinematographic Arts and Sciences (AMACC)
