= 56th Ariel Awards =

2014 Mexican film awards

- Date: 2014

Highlights
- Best Picture: La Jaula de Oro
- Most awards: La Jaula de Oro (9)
- Most nominations: Heli and La Jaula de Oro (14)

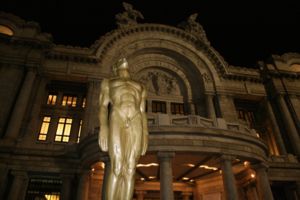
Ariel award

The 56th Ariel Awards ceremony, organized by the Mexican Academy of Film Arts and Sciences (AMACC) took place in 2014, in Mexico City. During the ceremony, AMACC presented the Ariel Award in 23 categories honoring films released in 2013. La Jaula de Oro received nine awards out of 14 nominations, including Best Picture and Best Actor for Brandon López. Amat Escalante won the accolade for Best Director. Other multiple awarded films included Cinco de Mayo: La Batalla and Ciudadano Buelna with two awards.

== Awards ==
Winners are listed first and highlighted with boldface

**Best Picture**: **La Jaula de Oro**; Club Sandwich; Heli; Los Insólitos Peces Gato; No Quiero Dormir Sola	**Best Director**: **Amat Escalante – Heli**; Fernando Eimbcke – Club Sandwich; Francisco Franco – Tercera Llamada; Claudia Sainte-Luce – Los Insólitos Peces Gato; Diego Quemada-Diez – La Jaula de Oro
**Best Actor**: **Brandon López – La Jaula de Oro as Juan**; Armando Espitia – Heli as Heli; Luis Gerardo Méndez – Nosotros Los Nobles as Javier "Javi" Noble; Jesús Padilla – Workers as Rafael; Harold Torres – La cebra as Odón	**Best Actress**: **Adriana Roel – No Quiero Dormir Sola** **as Dolores**; Ximena Ayala – Los Insólitos Peces Gato as Claudia; Dolores Heredia – Huérfanos as Ana María Escobar; María Renée Prudencio – Club Sandwich as Paloma; Arcelia Ramírez – Potosí as Estela
**Best Supporting Actor**: **Rodolfo Domínguez** – **La Jaula de Oro as Chauk**; Ricardo Blume – Tercera Llamada as Eduardo; Dagoberto Gama – Nómadas; Juan Eduardo Palacios – Heli as Beto; Gerardo Taracena – Potosí as Javier	**Best Supporting Actress**: **Lisa Owen** – **Los Insólitos Peces Gato as Martha**; Sonia Couoh – Potosí as Verónica; Mariana Gajá – No Quiero Dormir Sola as Amanda; Linda González – Heli as Sabrina; Rebecca Jones – Tercera Llamada as Amanda
**Best Original Screenplay**: **La Jaula de Oro – Diego Quemada-Diez, Gibrán Portela, and Lucía Carreras**; Heli – Amat Escalante and Gabriel Reyes; Los Insólitos Peces Gato – Claudia Sainte-Luce; No Quiero Dormir Sola – Gabriela Vidal and Natalia Beristain; Workers – José Luis Valle	**Best Adapted Screenplay**: **Tercera Llamada – María Renée Prudencio and Francisco Franco from the play Calígula... Probablemente by Francisco Franco and Ignacio Guzmán**; Nosotros Los Nobles – Gary Alazraki, Patricio Saiz, and Adrián Zurita from El Gran Calavera by Janet Alcoriza and Luis Alcoriza; Levantamuertos – Miguel Núñez from the play Amor Otro by Ángel Norzagaray
**Best Ibero-American Film**: **Gloria (Chile / Spain) – Sebastián Lelio**; 15 Años y Un Día (Spain) – Gracia Querejeta; Anina (Uruguay) – Alfredo Soderguit; Melaza (Cuba) – Carlos Lechuga; Wakolda (Argentina) – Lucía Puenzo	**Best First Feature Film**: **La Jaula de Oro – Diego Quemada-Diez**; Halley – Sebastián Hofmann; Los Insólitos Peces Gato – Claudia Sainte-Luce; No Quiero Dormir Sola – Natalia Beristain; Quebranto – Roberto Fiesco
**Best Documentary Feature**: **Quebranto – Roberto Fiesco**; El Alcalde – Emiliano Altuna, Carlos F. Rossini, and Diego Osorno; La Huella del Dr. Ernesto Guevara – Jorge Denti; Lejanía – Pablo Tamez Sierra; Miradas Múltiples, La Máquina Loca – Emilio Maillé	**Best Documentary Short Subject**: **Un Salto a la Vida – Eugenio Polgovsky**; Al Fin del Desierto – Sheila Altamirano; B-Boy – Abraham Escobedo; Conversaciones de Un Matrimonio – Gilberto González Penilla; La Música Silenciada – Andrea Oliva
**Best Animated Short**: **Lluvia en los Ojos – Rita Basulto**; La Casa Triste – Sofía Carrillo; Electrodoméstico – Erik de Luna; Un Día en Familia – Pedro González; ¿Qué Es La Guerra? – Luis Beltrán	**Best Original Score**: **La Jaula de Oro – Jacobo Lieberman and Leonardo Heiblum**; El Alcalde – Daniel Hidalgo; Halley – Gustavo Hernández; Huérfanos – Jesús Echevarría; Workers – José Miguel Enríquez
**Best Live Action Short**: **Música Para Después de Dormir – Nicolás Rojas**; Estatuas – Roberto Fiesco; Inframundo – Ana Mary Ramos	**Best Sound**: **La Jaula de Oro – Matías Barberis, Raúl Locatelli, and Jaime Baksht**; Ciudadano Buelna – Samuel Larson, Gabriel Coll, and Miguel Ángel Molina; Halley – Raúl Locatelli; Heli – Sergio Díaz, Catriel Vildosola, and Vincent Arnardi; Tercera Llamada – Matías Barberis, Pablo Tamez, and Jaime Baksht
**Best Editing**: **La Jaula de Oro – Paloma López and Felipe Gómez**; Heli – Natalia López; Workers – Óscar Figueroa Jara; Miradas Múltiples, La Maquina Loca – Octavio Iturbe; Tercera Llamada – Mariana Rodríguez	**Best Art Direction**: **Ciudadano Buelna – Lorenza Manrique**; Heli – Daniela Schneider; La Jaula de Oro – Carlos Jacques; Los Insólitos Peces Gato – Bárbara Enríquez; Workers – Gabriela Santos del Olmo
**Best Cinematography**: **La Jaula de Oro – María José Secco**; Ciudadano Buelna – Martin Boege; Fogo – Diego García; Heli – Lorenzo Haggerman; Workers – César Gutiérrez	**Best Makeup**: **Halley – Adam Zoller**; Ciudadano Buelna – Roberto Ortíz; Heli – Jorge Fuentes; La Jaula de Oro – Iñaki Legaspi; Tercera Llamada – Iñaki Legaspi
**Best Costume Design**: **Ciudadano Buelna – Mayra Juárez**; La Jaula de Oro – Nohemí González; Heli – Daniela Schneider; Huérfanos – Alejandra Dorantes; Tercera Llamada – Adela Cortázar and Jerildy Bosch	**Best Special Effects**: **Cinco de Mayo: La Batalla – Alejandro Vázquez**; Ciudadano Buelna – Jorge Farfán; Heli – Alejandro Vázquez, José Luis Pérez, and Carlos Ochoa
**Best Visual Effects**: **Cinco de Mayo: La Batalla – Charly Iturriaga**; Halley – Gustavo Bellón; Heli – Rodrigo Echevarría, Andrés Martínez Ríos, Juanma Nogales, Ana Rubio, and Eduardo Villadoms; La Jaula de Oro – María José Santa Rita

== Multiple nominations and awards ==
The following sixteen films received multiple nominations:

Nominations	Film
14	Heli
14	La Jaula de Oro
8	Tercera Llamada
7	Los Insólitos Peces Gato
6	Ciudadano Buelna
5	No Quiero Dormir Sola
5	Workers
4	Halley
3	Club Sandwich
3	Huérfanos
3	Potosí
2	Cinco de Mayo: La Batalla
2	El Alcalde
2	Nosotros Los Nobles
2	Miradas Múltiples, La Máquina Loca
2	Quebranto

Films that received multiple awards:

Awards	Film
9	La Jaula de Oro
2	Cinco de Mayo: La Batalla
2	Ciudadano Buelna
