= Esinencu =

Esinencu (or Esinenco) is a family name which may refer to:

- Nicolae Esinencu (1940–2016), Moldovan screenwriter and writer
- Nicoleta Esinencu (b. 1978), Moldovan playwright
