= Vlad Ioviță =

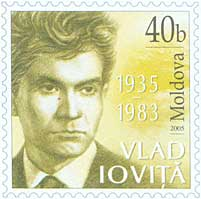
- Born: December 25, 1935; Cocieri
- Died: June 23, 1983 (aged 47); Chișinău
- Resting place: Chișinău

Vlad Ioviță (December 25, 1935 – June 23, 1983) was a film director from Moldova also known as a writer and publicist.

== Biography ==
Vlad Ioviță was born on December 25, 1935, in Cocieri. He received his training at the Vaganova Academy of Russian Ballet (1954), and then followed the High Courses for Scriptwriters and Film Directors (1962-1964), then worked for Moldova-Film.

Also, Vlad Ioviță fulfilled the function of secretary of the Union of Filmmakers of Moldova (1981–1983). He was awarded the State Prize and the honorary title of Merited Artist (1982). He died on June 23, 1983, in Chișinău municipality, being buried in his native village.

== Film director ==
=== Action movies ===
- Nuntă la palat (1969)
- Dimitrie Cantemir (în colaborare cu Vitalie Calaşnicov, 1973)
- Calul, puşca şi nevasta (1975)
- La porţile satanei (1980)

=== Documentary movies ===
- Fântâna (1966)
- Unde joacă moldovenii (1967)
- Malanca, carnavalul de iarnă (1968)
- Trăiască Victoria! (1971)
- Dansul toamnelor noastre (1983)

=== Screenplay ===
- Se caută un paznic (1967)
- Vica, eu şi foiletonul (s/m, 1972)
- Dimitrie Cantemir (1973)
- Durata zilei (în colaborare cu Valeriu Gagiu, 1974)
- Calul, puşca şi nevasta (în colaborare cu Nicolae Esinencu, 1975)
- Povestea lui Făt-Frumos (în colaborare cu Nicolae Esinencu, 1977)
- La porţile satanei (în colaborare cu Nicolae Esinencu, 1980)

== Works ==
- Dincolo de ploaie (1970; 1979)
- Trei proze (1971)
- Dimitrie-Vodă Cantemir (1973)
- Făt-Frumos. Nuvelă cinematografică (Ed. Literatura artistică, Chişinău, 1981)
- Un hectar de umbră pentru Sahara (1984)
- Friguri (1988)
- Un hectar de umbră pentru Sahara. Antologie, tabel cronologic şi referinţe istorico-literare de Viorica Zaharia-Stamati (Ed. Litera internaţional, Chişinău, 2004)

== Gallery ==
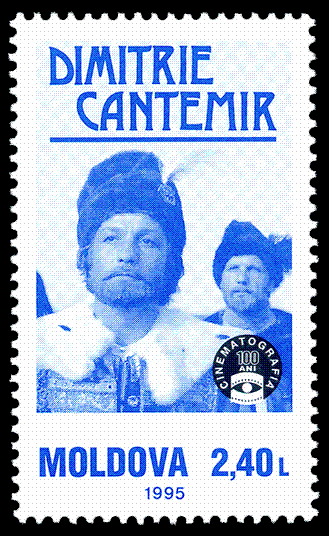
Filmstill “Dimitrie Cantemir” (1973). Scriptwriter and director - Vlad Ioviţă, in the role of Cantemir - Mihai Volontir.

== Bibliography ==
- Lirism şi obiectivare în proza de început a lui Vlad Ioviţă. În "Metaliteratură. Analele Facultăţii de Filologie", vol. VI (Chişinău, 2002)
- Valenţele lirismului baladesc în proza lui Vlad Ioviţă. În "Revista de lingvistică şi ştiinţă literară" din Chişinău, nr. 5-6/2003
- Un hectar de umbră pentru Sahara: tentaţia formulei epice obiective. În "Metaliteratură. Analele Facultăţii de Filologie, vol. VII (Chişinău, 2003)
- Dimitrie Cantemir văzut de Vlad Ioviţă. În "Metaliteratură. Analele Facultăţii de Filologie", vol.VIII (Chişinău, 2003)
- Fantasticul în cotidian. În "Metaliteratură. Analele Facultăţii de Filologie", vol. VIII (Chişinău, 2003)
- “Ciudaţii” şi “suciţi” în proza lui V. Ioviţă. În "Conferinţa profesorilor Universităţii Pedagogice de Stat "Ion Creangă". Tezele conferinţei (Chişinău, 2004)
- Lirismul baladesc la Vlad Ioviţă. În "Analele ştiinţifice ale doctoranzilor şi competitorilor. Universitatea Pedagogică de Stat "Ion Creangă", vol. V (Chişinău, 2004)
- Despre tipologia personajelor în proza lui Vlad Ioviţă. În "Metaliteratură. Analele Facultăţii de Filologie", vol. IX (Chişinău, 2004)
- Vaniuţa Milionaru – un “ciudat” dar nu un învins. În "Metaliteratură. Analele Facultăţii de Filologie", vol. X (Chişinău, 2004)
- Dialogul intertextual în nuvela "Se caută un paznic". În "Metaliteratură. Analele Facultăţii de Filologie", vol. XI (Chişinău, 2005)
- Modalităţi de psihologizare în proza lui Vlad Ioviţă. În "Limba română" din Chişinău, nr. 5/2005.
- Mihai Cimpoi, Alexandru Burlacu, Dumitru Olărescu, Ana-Maria Plămădeală - Vlad Ioviţă. Dincolo de timp (Ed. Cartea Moldovei, Chişinău, 2005)
