= Where Has Love Gone? (film) =

- original film poster
- Russian: Где ты, любовь?
- Directed by: Valeriu Gagiu
- Screenplay by: Valeriu Gagiu, Aleksandr Volkovskiy
- Produced by: Andrei Romanow, Jefim Lecht
- Starring: Sofia Rotaru, Grigore Grigoriu, Evgueny Menishov
- Cinematography: Valentin Belonogov
- Music by: Aleksei Mazhukov
- Distributed by: Moldova-Film
- Release date: 1 January 1980
- Running time: 79 minutes
- Country: Soviet Union
- Language: Russian

Where Has Love Gone? (Russian: Где ты, любовь?, romanized: Gde ty, lyubov?, lit. Where Are You, Love?) is a 1980 Soviet musical drama film, written and directed by Valeriu Gagiu, starring Sofia Rotaru as well as Grigore Grigoriu and Evgueny Menishov. The movie features songs performed by Sofia Rotaru. The setting includes Moldavian landscape and countryside life, as well as the Black Sea coast, Chişinău and Odessa.

Although heavily criticized by cinema experts, even by Sofia Rotaru herself, the film gathered more than 25 million viewers in the former Soviet Union. In 2002, the official video version of the movie directed by Valeriu Gagiu at the Moldova-Film studios in 1980 was released.

== Plot ==
After graduation from conservatory, music professor Marcela (Sofia Rotaru) teaches music in a village music school in Moldova. As a main solo vocal she is invited to join a musical vocal instrumental ensemble, which is being directed by astronomer Viktor. The first rehearsal takes place in the astronomic star observatory tower and that's where Viktor falls in love with Marcela. Andrei also has his idea about Marcela as he cheerly appreciates her first performance with their band. Marcela returns home to the village, where her local admirer waits for her next to her house door. The rehearsals lead to an invitation to perform on a cruise ship in the Black Sea. As the relationship with Viktor staggers, Andrei manages to approach Marcela. Love, artistic successes, and, as the genre requires, a victory at an international song festival are awaiting Marcela.

== Cast ==
- Sofia Rotaru as Marcela Bazatin
- Grigore Grigoriu as Viktor
- Evgueny Menishov as Andrei
- Ekaterine Kazimirova
- Konstantin Konstantinov
- Viktor Ignat
- Viktor Chutak

== Production ==
The shooting of the movie started in Kishinev. The all-Soviet star Sofia Rotaru was selected to play the main role. In fact, in the half-documentary, half-autobiographical film, Rotaru played her real self, even though the last name of the heroine (Botezat) was not the same as the main role artist.

From the beginning the movie was planned to be a musical film; that is why the Soviet singer Sofia Rotaru was invited.

The producer Valeriu Gagiu said:

Truly speaking, the film Gde ty, lyubov'? was a ground breaking type film for me. In fact, I was going to shoot another musical film, where Sofia Rotaru had to play as well. However, the Goskino decided otherwise. I can still remember as I was told: "Make a movie about Rotaru, otherwise we will not let your film go through". This being said, I should mention that the preparations for the shooting of the film had already started, whereas we did not even have a scenario for the movie about Rotaru!

As a result, the scenario was written in a way that it satisfied the conductorship as well. This was supposed to be the first full-fledged drama movie about Sofia Rotaru. The singer has agreed to play the role as she was on tour in Odessa. The shooting of the film started with an ensemble of actors, which represented the real cinema stars, even though the movie was a musical film: Grigore Grigoriu, Evgueny Menishov (presenter of the yearly song festival "Song of the Year" with Angelina Vovk), Viktor Chyutak cast. Because of the movie, Rotaru had to refuse to tour, what did not fit in with the plans of the director of Chervona Ruta ensemble, where Sofia Rotaru was the leading soloist singer. The shooting of the movie took place in Moldova, Crimea, and Odessa.

One of the film episodes was shot in the museum-tower of the State University of Moldova. According to the producer Cagiu, he always dreamed of shooting something in the tower and he had specially planned a scene in it. Vaeriu Gagiu said:

Indeed, the main male hero was astronomer by his profession. That is why we have used for the shootings the observatory in the tower. As far as the truthfulness or imagination of the plot... Many things did in fact fit in together, both in the life of the main female heroine and in the real life of Sofia Rotaru: village country girl, teacher, soloist of the band.

According to the participants of the shootings, Sofia Rotaru experienced stress in front of the cameras and the producer had to work thoroughly and long with the singer; according to Gagiu, it would eventually lead to quarrels.

At that time, Sofia Rotaru was known throughout the whole Soviet Union, but was shy of her fame and stressed when she was stopped on the streets for an autograph, often she would lock herself in the hotel room. However, all the sacrifices proved to be efficient, as the film enjoyed a major success. Right after the release of Gde ty, lyubov'?, Sofia Rotaru was proposed a new leading role in the next drama film Dusha.

One of the most popular hits of Sofia Rotaru, the song "Red Arrow" (music: Aleksey Mazhukov, lyrics: Nikolay Zinoviev), was written and composed specially for the film Gde ty, lyubov'?.

== Soundtrack ==
Popular schlagers of 1970-1980s are performed in the film, created by Ion Aldi, Aleksandr Zatsepin, Alexei Mazhukov, Raimonds Pauls, Yury Saulsky.

Most of the songs were released in the album of Sofia Rotaru - Songs from the movie "Gde ty, lyubov'"

- List of songs performed by Sofia Rotaru:

N°	Song	Performed by	Authors	Commentaries
1	"Come"; Romanian: Să Vii	Sofia Rotaru	^{Lyrics: Dumitru Matcovschi; Music: Ion-Aldea Teodorovici}	first performed in the movie Where has Love Gone?, released in the album Songs from the movie "Where Has Love Gone?"
2	"First Rain"; Первый дождь/Pervy dozhd	Sofia Rotaru	^{Lyrics: Leonid Zavalnyuk; Music: Aleksander Zatsepin}	first performed in the movie Dusha, released in the album Songs from the movie "Where Has Love Gone?"
3	"Mother's Heart"; Romanian: Inimă de Mamă Осенняя песня/Osennyaya pesnya	Sofia Rotaru	^{Lyrics: Dumitru Matcovschi; Music: Ion-Aldea Teodorovici}	first performed in the movie Where has Love Gone?, released in the album Songs from the movie "Where Has Love Gone?"
4	"Dance on the Drum"; Танец на барабане/Tanets na barabane	Sofia Rotaru	^{Lyrics: Andrey Voznesensky; Music: Raimonds Pauls}	first performed in the movie Dusha, released in the album Songs from the movie "Where Has Love Gone?"
5	"Ioane" (English: "Hey, John!"); Romanian: Ioane Иванушка/Ivanushka	Sofia Rotaru	^{Lyrics: Dumitru Matcovschi; Music: Petru Teodorovici}	first performed in the movie Where has Love Gone?, released in the album Songs from the movie "Where Has Love Gone?"
6	"Do Not Forget"; Не забывай/Ne zabyvay	Sofia Rotaru	^{Lyrics: Leonid Zavalnyuk; Music: Yury Saulsky}	first performed in the movie Dusha, released in the album Songs from the movie "Where Has Love Gone?"
7	"Gde ty, lyubov'?" Где ты любовь/Gde ty lyubov	Sofia Rotaru	^{Lyrics: Ilya Reznik; Music: Raimonds Pauls}	first performed in the movie Dusha, released in the album Songs from the movie "Where Has Love Gone?"
