= List of submissions to the 86th Academy Awards for Best Foreign Language Film =

2013 Best Foreign Language Film submissions
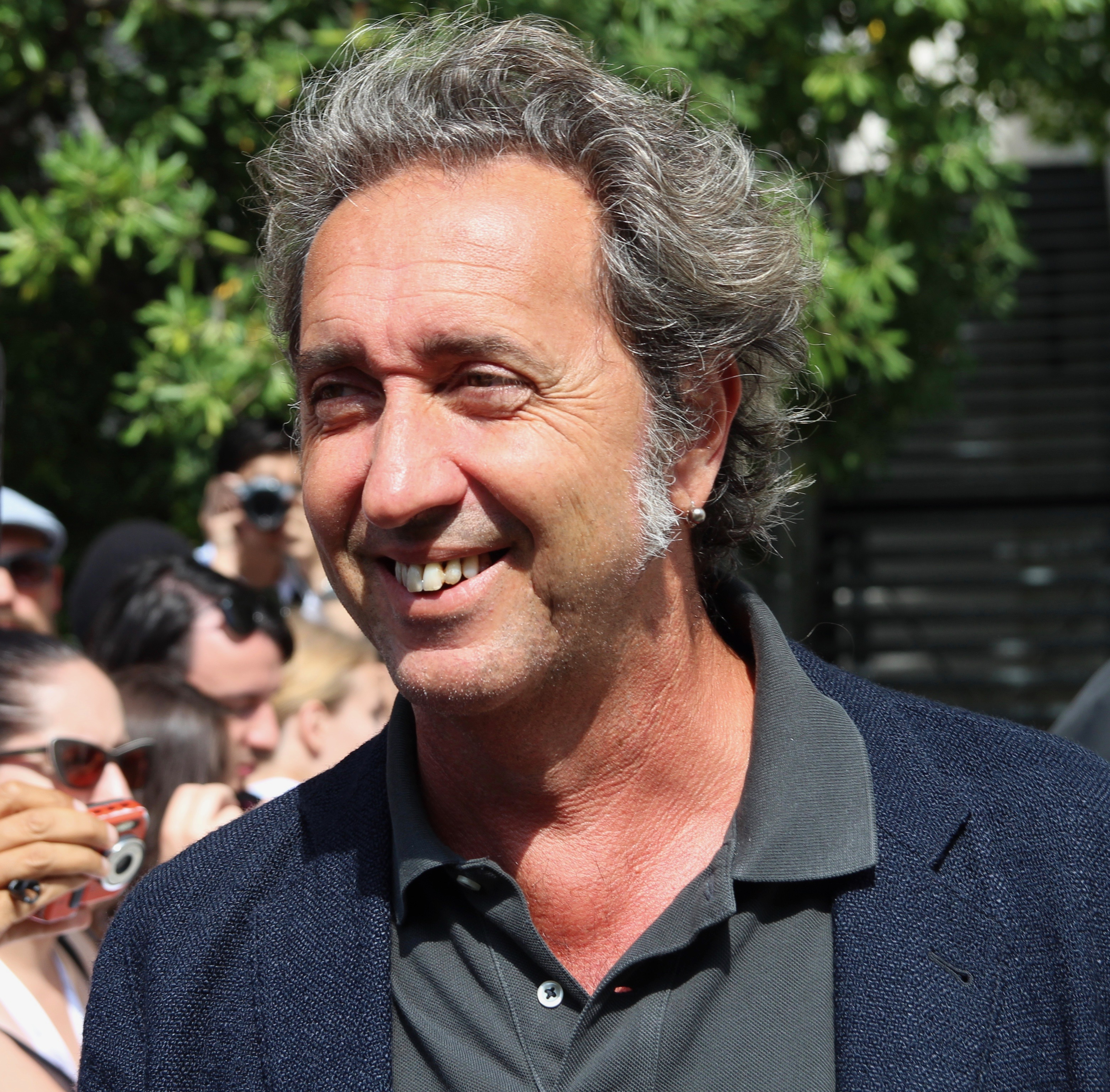
- Paolo Sorrentino directed The Great Beauty, which won the year's award.

Highlights
- Oscar winner: (Italy) The Great Beauty
- Submissions: 76
- Debuts: 3
- Total eligible: 76

This is a list of submissions to the 86th Academy Awards for the Best Foreign Language Film. The Academy of Motion Picture Arts and Sciences (AMPAS) has invited the film industries of various countries to submit their best film for the Academy Award for Best Foreign Language Film every year since the award was created in 1956. The award is presented annually by the Academy to a feature-length motion picture produced outside the United States that contains primarily non-English dialogue. The Foreign Language Film Award Committee oversees the process and reviews all the submitted films.

For the 86th Academy Awards, the submitted motion pictures must have first been released theatrically in their respective countries between 1 October 2012 and 30 September 2013. The deadline for submissions to the Academy was 1 October 2013. 76 countries submitted films and were found to be eligible by AMPAS and screened for voters. Moldova, Montenegro and Saudi Arabia submitted films for the first time, while Pakistan made a submission for the first time since 1963. After the 9-film shortlist was announced on 20 December 2013, the five nominees were announced on 16 January 2014.

Italy won the award for the fourteenth time, expanding its own record as the most winning country, with The Great Beauty by Paolo Sorrentino.

== Submissions ==
Submitting country	Film title used in nomination	Original title	Language(s)	Director(s)	Result
Afghanistan	Wajma (An Afghan Love Story)	وژمه	Dari	Barmak Akram	Not nominated
Albania	Agon		Albanian, Greek	Robert Budina	Not nominated
Argentina	The German Doctor	Wakolda	Spanish, German, Hebrew	Lucía Puenzo	Not nominated
Australia	The Rocket	ບັ້ງໄຟ	Lao	Kim Mordaunt	Not nominated
Austria	The Wall	Die Wand	German	Julian Pölsler	Not nominated
Azerbaijan	Steppe Man	Çölçü	Azerbaijani	Shamil Aliyev	Not nominated
Bangladesh	Television	টেলিভিশন	Bengali	Mostofa Sarwar Farooki	Not nominated
Belgium	The Broken Circle Breakdown		Flemish, English, Dutch	Felix Van Groeningen	Nominated
Bosnia and Herzegovina	An Episode in the Life of an Iron Picker	Epizoda u životu berača željeza	Bosnian, Balkan Romani	Danis Tanović	Made shortlist
Brazil	Neighboring Sounds	O Som ao Redor	Brazilian Portuguese, English, Mandarin	Kleber Mendonça Filho	Not nominated
Bulgaria	The Colour of the Chameleon	Цветът на Хамелеона	Bulgarian	Emil Hristov	Not nominated
Cambodia	The Missing Picture	L'image manquante / រូបភាពដែលបាត់បង់	French	Rithy Panh	Nominated
Canada	Gabrielle		French	Louise Archambault	Not nominated
Chad	GriGris		French, Arabic	Mahamat-Saleh Haroun	Not nominated
Chile	Gloria		Spanish	Sebastián Lelio	Not nominated
China	Back to 1942	一九四二	Mandarin, Central Plains Mandarin, English, Japanese	Feng Xiaogang	Not nominated
Colombia	La Playa DC		Spanish	Juan Andrés Arango	Not nominated
Croatia	Halima's Path	Halimin put	Bosnian, Bosnian–Dalmatian, Croatian, Serbian	Arsen Anton Ostojić	Not nominated
Czech Republic	The Don Juans	Donšajni	Czech	Jiří Menzel	Not nominated
Denmark	The Hunt	Jagten	Danish, English, Polish	Thomas Vinterberg	Nominated
Dominican Republic	Who's the Boss?	¿Quién manda?	Spanish	Ronni Castillo	Not nominated
Ecuador	Porcelain Horse	Mejor no hablar (de ciertas cosas)	Spanish	Javier Andrade	Not nominated
Egypt	Winter of Discontent	الشتا إللى فات	Arabic	Ibrahim el-Batout	Not nominated
Estonia	Free Range	Free Range: Ballaad maailma heakskiitmisest	Estonian	Veiko Õunpuu	Not nominated
Finland	Disciple	Lärjungen	Åland Swedish	Ulrika Bengts	Not nominated
France	Renoir		French, Italian	Gilles Bourdos	Not nominated
Georgia	In Bloom	გრძელი ნათელი დღეები	Georgian	Nana Ekvtimishvili and Simon Groß	Not nominated
Germany	Two Lives	Zwei Leben	German, Norwegian, English, Russian, Danish	Georg Maas	Made shortlist
Greece	Boy Eating the Bird's Food	Το Αγόρι Τρώει το Φαγητό του Πουλιού	Greek, German	Ektoras Lygizos	Not nominated
Hong Kong	The Grandmaster	一代宗師	Cantonese, Mandarin, Japanese	Wong Kar-wai	Made shortlist
Hungary	The Notebook	A nagy füzet	Hungarian, German	János Szász	Made shortlist
Iceland	Of Horses and Men	Hross í oss	Icelandic, Swedish, English, Spanish, Russian	Benedikt Erlingsson	Not nominated
India	The Good Road	ધ ગુડ રોડ	Gujarati	Gyan Correa	Not nominated
Indonesia	Sang Kiai		Indonesian, Javanese, Arabic, Japanese, English	Rako Prijanto	Not nominated
Iran	The Past	Le Passé / گذشته	French, Persian, Italian	Asghar Farhadi	Not nominated
Israel	Bethlehem	בית לחם	Hebrew, Arabic	Yuval Adler	Not nominated
Italy	The Great Beauty	La grande bellezza	Italian, Romanesco, Japanese, Spanish, Mandarin, French, Latin, German, English	Paolo Sorrentino	Won Academy Award
Japan	The Great Passage	舟を編む	Japanese	Yuya Ishii	Not nominated
Kazakhstan	The Old Man	Шал	Kazakh, Russian	Ermek Tursunov	Not nominated
Latvia	Mother, I Love You	Mammu, es tevi mīlu	Latvian	Jānis Nords	Not nominated
Lebanon	Blind Intersections	قصة ثواني	Arabic	Lara Saba	Not nominated
Lithuania	Conversations on Serious Topics	Pokalbiai rimtomis temomis	Lithuanian	Giedrė Beinoriūtė	Not nominated
Luxembourg	Blind Spot	Doudege Wénkel	Luxembourgish, French	Christophe Wagner	Not nominated
Mexico	Heli		Spanish	Amat Escalante	Not nominated
Moldova	All God's Children	Toti copiii domnului	Romanian, Italian, English	Adrian Popovici	Not nominated
Montenegro	Ace of Spades: Bad Destiny	As pik - loša sudbina	Serbian	Draško Đurović	Not nominated
Morocco	Horses of God	يا خيل الله / Les chevaux de Dieu	Arabic, French	Nabil Ayouch	Not nominated
Nepal	Soongava: Dance of the Orchids	सुनगाभा	Nepali, Newar, English	Subarna Thapa	Not nominated
Netherlands	Borgman		Dutch, English	Alex van Warmerdam	Not nominated
New Zealand	White Lies	Tuakiri Huna	Māori, English	Dana Rotberg	Not nominated
Norway	I Am Yours	Jeg er din	Norwegian, Urdu, Swedish	Iram Haq	Not nominated
Pakistan	Run for Your Life	زندہ بھاگ	Punjabi, Urdu	Meenu Gaur and Farjad Nabi	Not nominated
Palestine	Omar	عمر	Arabic, Hebrew	Hany Abu Assad	Nominated
Peru	The Cleaner	El limpiador	Spanish	Adrián Saba	Not nominated
Philippines	Transit		Filipino, Hebrew, English	Hannah Espia	Not nominated
Poland	Walesa. Man of Hope	Wałęsa. Człowiek z nadziei	Polish, Italian	Andrzej Wajda	Not nominated
Portugal	Lines of Wellington	Linhas de Wellington	Portuguese, French, English	Valeria Sarmiento	Not nominated
Romania	Child's Pose	Poziţia copilului	Romanian	Călin Peter Netzer	Not nominated
Russia	Stalingrad	Сталинград	Russian, German, Japanese	Fedor Bondarchuk	Not nominated
Saudi Arabia	Wadjda	وجدة	Arabic	Haifaa al-Mansour	Not nominated
Serbia	Circles	Кругови	Serbian, German, Croatian	Srdan Golubović	Not nominated
Singapore	Ilo Ilo	爸妈不在家	Singaporean Hokkien, Filipino, Hiligaynon, English, Mandarin, Cantonese	Anthony Chen	Not nominated
Slovakia	My Dog Killer	Môj pes Killer	Záhorie Slovak, Czech	Mira Fornay	Not nominated
Slovenia	Class Enemy	Razredni sovražnik	Slovene, German	Rok Biček	Not nominated
South Africa	Four Corners		Afrikaans, Sabela, Tsotsitaal, Kaaps, English	Ian Gabriel	Not nominated
South Korea	Juvenile Offender	범죄소년	Korean	Kang Yi-kwan	Not nominated
Spain	15 Years and One Day	15 años y un día	Spanish	Gracia Querejeta	Not nominated
Sweden	Eat Sleep Die	Äta sova dö	Swedish, Montenegrin, Bosnian, Serbian, Croatian, Norwegian, Thai	Gabriela Pichler	Not nominated
Switzerland	More than Honey		German, Swiss German, Mandarin, English	Markus Imhoof	Not nominated
Taiwan	Soul	失魂	Mandarin, Taiwanese Hokkien	Chung Mong-hong	Not nominated
Thailand	Countdown	เคาท์ดาวน์	Thai, English	Nattawut Poonpiriya	Not nominated
Turkey	The Butterfly's Dream	Kelebeğin Rüyası	Turkish	Yılmaz Erdoğan	Not nominated
Ukraine	Paradjanov	Параджанов	Ukrainian, Russian	Serge Avedikian and Olena Fetisova	Not nominated
United Kingdom	Metro Manila		Filipino, English	Sean Ellis	Not nominated
Uruguay	Anina		Spanish	Alfredo Soderguit	Not nominated
Venezuela	Breach in the Silence	Brecha en el silencio	Spanish	Andrés Eduardo and Luis Alejandro Rodríguez	Not nominated

== Notes ==
- The Czech Republic originally submitted the cinematic version of the television mini-series Burning Bush by Agnieszka Holland. AMPAS disqualified the film, citing regulations that the film must not have initially appeared on television. The mini-series aired on Czech TV eight months prior to the re-edited version that appeared in cinemas. The Don Juans by Jiří Menzel was submitted in its place.
- Lebanon initially selected Ghadi by Amin Dora in a two-way race over Blind Intersections by Lara Saba. When the film's release date was moved from 26 September 2013 to 31 October 2013, it no longer met the eligibility dates and Blind Intersections became the official submission from Lebanon. However, Ghadi became Lebanon's submission the following year.
- (North Macedonia) Macedonia's Association of Filmmakers had two candidates: Balkan Is Not Dead by Aleksandar Popovski and The Piano Room by Igor Ivanov Izi, but it could not recommend either film for submission. In a statement they said "According to the topics treated and the way that they are shown in both films, the commission considers they are not appropriate to be nominated" and "In addition, the committee unanimously decided this year not to [propose] any film."
- Vietnam's Ministry of Culture assembled an official selection committee and launched an open call for entries. However, on 19 September 2013, the National Cinema Department announced they had no films that are eligible to compete. The only film that applied to represent the country, Blood Letter by Victor Vũ was released too early to qualify.
