= Menshov =

Menshov (Russian: Меньшов, also transliterated Menchov or Menishov) is a Russian masculine surname originating from the word menshoi, referring to the youngest son in a family; its feminine counterpart is Menshova. Notable people with the name include:

- Denis Menchov (born 1978), Russian road bicycle racer
- Dmitrii Menshov (1892–1988), Russian mathematician
- Evgueny Menishov (1947–2015), Russian actor
- Konstantin Menshov (born 1983), Russian figure skater
- Tatyana Menshova (born 1970), Russian volleyball player
- Vladimir Menshov (1939–2021), Russian actor and film director
- Yuliya Menshova (born 1969), Russian actress
