= The Elephant King =

- Film poster
- Directed by: Seth Grossman
- Written by: Seth Grossman
- Produced by: Tamar Sela; Tom Waller; Emanuel Michael; Nicole Harper; Cassandra Kulukundis
- Starring: Tate Ellington; Jonno Roberts; Florence Faivre; Ellen Burstyn; Josef Sommer
- Cinematography: Diego Quemada-Diez
- Edited by: Lee Chatametikool; Inbal B. Lessner
- Music by: Adam Balazs
- Production companies: Unison Films; De Warrenne Pictures
- Release dates: April 26, 2006 (Tribeca Film Festival); October 17, 2008
- Running time: 92 minutes
- Countries: Thailand; United States
- Languages: English; Thai

The Elephant King is a 2006 romantic drama film directed by Seth Grossman.

== Story ==
It is about a depressed teenager who wants to write a story about an anthropologist in Thailand. The anthropologist character is inspired by his older brother who has some debt issues. Meanwhile the teenagers mother wants him to be happy and does things such as set up a date for him.

Eventually the teenager goes to Thailand to try to return his older brother back to the United States of America. He falls in love with a Thai girl and thereby wants to stay in Thailand as well.

== Reception ==
Rotten Tomatoes gives the film a rating of 18% based on reviews from 11 critics with an average rating of 4.2/10.
