= The Golden Dream =

2013 film

- Film poster
- Spanish: La jaula de oro
- Literally: The golden cage
- Directed by: Diego Quemada-Diez
- Written by: Diego Quemada-Diez
- Starring: Brandon López
- Cinematography: María Secco
- Release dates: 22 May 2013 (Cannes); 9 May 2014 (Mexico)
- Running time: 102 minutes
- Country: Mexico
- Language: Spanish

The Golden Dream (Spanish: La jaula de oro), also known as The Golden Cage, is a 2013 Mexican drama film directed by Spanish-born Mexican director Diego Quemada-Diez. It was premiered in the Un Certain Regard official selection at the 2013 Cannes Film Festival where Quemada-Diez won the A Certain Talent award for his directing work and the ensemble cast. The film also won the Golden Ástor for Best Film at the 2013 Mar del Plata International Film Festival.

== Plot ==
Like the 1987 film, and the song, the plot concerns immigration to the United States from Latin American countries. However, unlike the earlier film that concerned itself with a successful and middle-aged Mexican immigrant, the plot of this film deals with younger undocumented immigrants.

Samuel, Sara and Juan, three teenagers from Guatemala, decide to leave poverty by going to the United States. After crossing the Mexican border by boat, they find another immigrant, a Tzotzil native called Chauk who does not know Spanish but is able to befriend Sara. When they arrive in the town of Chiapas, they busk for money to eat and drink but are later caught by Mexican Immigration Police agents, who steal Juan's boots and threaten Chauk with a gun, before deporting all of them back to Guatemala.

They are deposited by the border to Mexico and so they are able to easily find a way back across it, but at this point Samuel decides to stay in Guatemala. Juan dislikes the idea of going with Chauk, but Sara forces him to go on with him and the three continue on the road to the north. While riding on a train to northern Mexico, the train is stopped by the Mexican Army who attempt to capture the immigrants; however, the trio manage to escape and are offered refuge and work by a sugar-cane farmer. During a party at the plantation, the three of them drink and dance until Sara and Juan begin kissing, and end up leaving Chauk alone.

The next morning Chauk feels betrayed by Sara, but decides to remain with them and continue the ride to the north. During the trip, they are detained by drug traffickers, who steal the belongings of the passengers and kidnap the females. Sara, who was disguised and pretending to be a boy, is soon recognized as a girl and is taken by the traffickers; when Juan and Chauk resist, Juan is seriously injured and Chauk is knocked unconscious.

Chauk wakes up and tends to Juan's injuries. When Juan recovers, both recognize that they can do nothing for Sara and decide to continue their voyage to the north. During the next train ride, they meet a teenager from Guatemala that offers them jobs, but in reality it is just a trick and the boy delivers them into the hands of a group of criminals. When the leader learns that Juan is from his own hometown, Juan is released. Juan later returns and offers the leader the American Dollars he had saved before the journey, in order to free Chauk.

Juan and Chauk arrive in Mexicali, where they get help from a group of immigrant traffickers to cross the border between Mexico and United States. The traffickers take the boys across the border, but leave the two on their own in the desert, where Chauk is killed by an immigrant hunter. Juan then arrives in Phoenix where he gets a job in a meat factory. The movie ends with Juan looking up at snow falling in the night sky, realizing that Chauk had wanted to come north to see snow for the first time.

== Cast ==
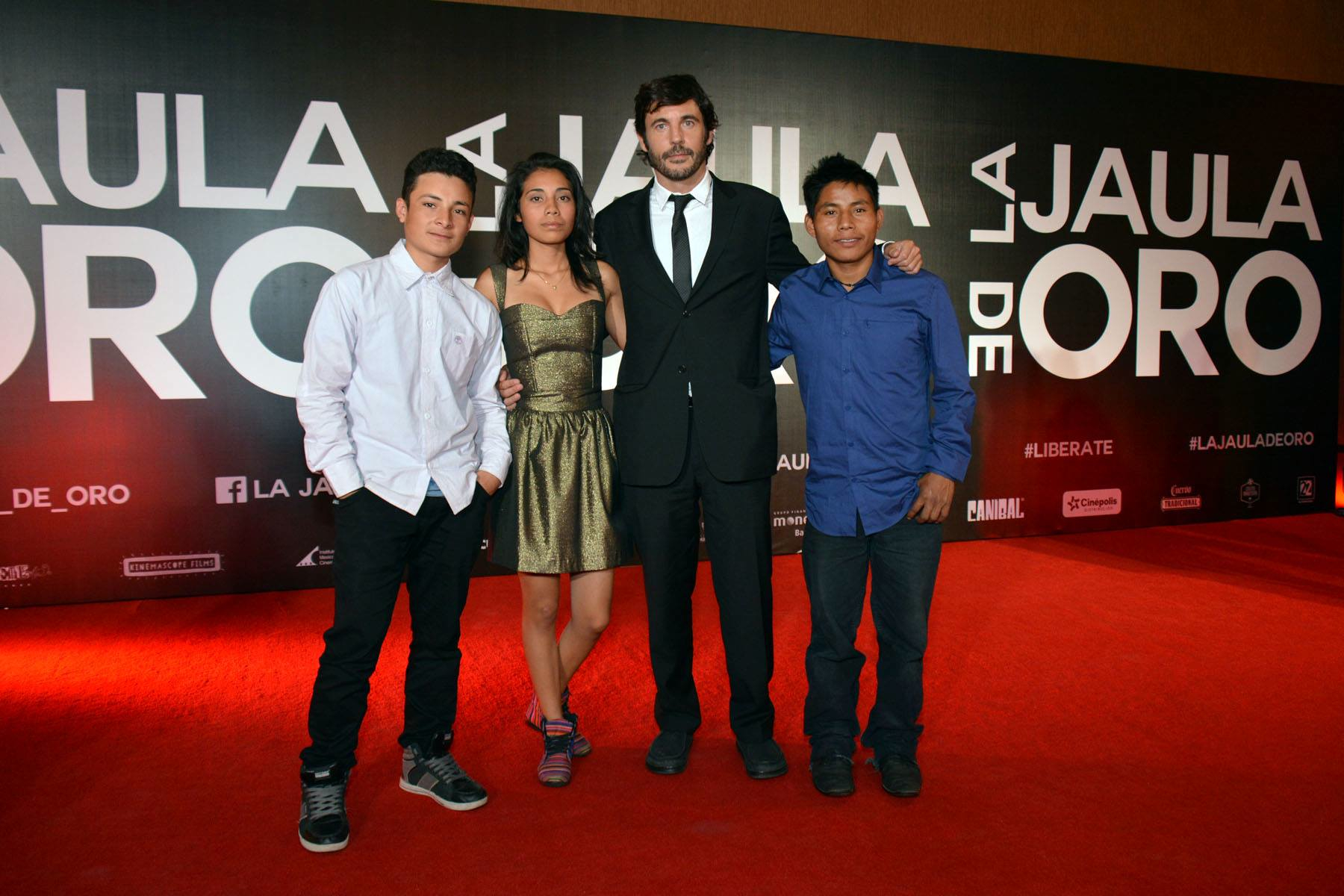
Brandon Lopez, Karen Martinez, Diego Quemada-Diez, Rodolfo Dominguez at La Jaula de Oro premiere in Mexico city

- Brandon López as Juan
- Rodolfo Domínguez as Chauk
- Carlos Chajon as Samuel
- Karen Noemí Martínez Pineda as Sara

== Production ==
La jaula de oro was a Mexico-Spain co-production produced by Edher Campos, Inna Payán, and Luis Salinas, with international sales handled by Films Boutique. The screenplay was written by Diego Quemada-Diez, Lucía Carreras, and Gibrán Portela. María Secco served as cinematographer, Paloma López Carrillo and Felipe Gómez edited the film, and Jacobo Lieberman and Leonardo Heiblum composed the music.

In 2010, the project was selected for the Cinéfondation's L'Atelier programme at the Cannes Film Festival, an initiative created to help filmmakers complete financing and move their projects towards production.

Quemada-Diez cast the film largely with non-professional performers. Around 6,000 children were considered for the roles of Juan, Chauk, Samuel and Sara. Brandon López, Karen Martínez and Rodolfo Domínguez were chosen from approximately 3,000 applicants who attended auditions in Guatemala and Chiapas. The film also included about 600 migrants encountered along the route as non-performing participants. Before filming, the young cast took part in an intensive workshop with Brazilian acting coach Fátima Toledo, using physical exercises to build confidence and become accustomed to the camera.

The screenplay grew out of more than 600 interviews that Quemada-Diez conducted with migrants over six years.

== Release ==
La jaula de oro premiered in the Un Certain Regard section of the 66th Cannes Film Festival on 22 May 2013. It opened theatrically in Mexico in May 2014.

The film opened in the United States on 28 August 2015 in the Los Angeles and San Diego areas, followed by New York City on 4 September and a wider rollout later that autumn. A United States video-on-demand release followed in February 2016. The film was available on platforms such as iTunes, Google Play and Amazon.

== Reception ==
=== Critical response ===
The film received generally positive reviews. On Rotten Tomatoes, 89% of 38 critics' reviews are positive.

Reviews commonly discussed the film's social-realist style, non-professional cast, narrative unpredictability and cinematography, while also noting the influence of Ken Loach and comparisons with Sin nombre. John Anderson of The Wall Street Journal emphasized the combination of contemporary migration realities with the structure of a mythic journey.

Assessments of the pacing and visual style were less uniform. Stephanie Merry of The Washington Post found the pace unhurried and the middle section less effective, although she considered the film's realism and conclusion successful. The Hollywood Reporter regarded the film as a competent treatment of familiar festival subject matter but found its visual style comparatively flat.

=== Scholarly reception ===
Academic studies have examined the film's treatment of migration, social exclusion and border violence. Byron A. Barahona connects its festival reception in Europe and Latin America with heightened international attention to refugee and migration crises. He also argues that the film's combination of realist and metaphorical imagery emphasizes the vulnerability and traumatic experiences of adolescent migrants.

Claudia Sandberg and Glenda Mejía place the film within Latin American socio-critical cinema and the road-movie genre. Their analysis argues that its documentary-like representation of social conditions is combined with imagery of hope and possibility, while relations of power operate through age, gender and race. Ketlyn Mara Rosa and Janaina Mirian Rosa similarly examine the border as a place of violence and marginalization, contrasting the forms of control encountered at the Guatemala-Mexico and Mexico-United States crossings.

== Accolades ==
Year	Awarding body	Category
2013	Cannes Film Festival	Un Certain Talent Prize (ensemble cast)
2013	Zurich Film Festival	Best Feature Film
2013	Mumbai Film Festival	Best Film
2013	Morelia International Film Festival	Audience Award Best First or Second Mexican Feature Film Guerrero Press Award
2013	Thessaloniki International Film Festival	Golden Alexander Best Director Audience Award
2013	Mar del Plata International Film Festival	Golden Astor for Best Feature Film Audience Award Best Cinematography
2014	56th Ariel Awards	Nine awards, including Best Picture, Best First Feature, Best Actor, Best Supporting Actor and Best Original Screenplay
2014	Fénix Awards	Best Fiction Feature Best Editing Best Sound
