= The Last Call (2013 film) =

- Theatrical release poster
- Directed by: Francisco Franco
- Screenplay by: Francisco Franco; María Renée Prudencio
- Based on: Calígula, probablemente by Francisco Franco & Ignacio Guzmán
- Produced by: Laura Imperiale
- Starring: Irene Azuela; Karina Gidi; Rebecca Jones; Fernando Luján
- Cinematography: Erika Licea
- Edited by: Mariana Rodríguez
- Music by: Jesús Cruz
- Production company: Las Naves Producciones
- Release dates: March 2013 (GIFF); October 4, 2013 (Mexico)
- Running time: 92 minutes
- Country: Mexico
- Language: Spanish

The Last Call (Spanish: Tercera llamada, lit. 'Third call') is a 2013 Mexican comedy-drama film directed by Francisco Franco and written by Franco & María Renée Prudencio. Starring Irene Azuela, Karina Gidi, Rebecca Jones and Fernando Luján. It is based on the play Calígula, probablemente by Francisco Franco and Ignacio Guzmán.

== Synopsis ==
The film narrates the process of creating the play Caligula. However, the harmony of the team is in question. The play, written by a French existentialist, is directed by a neurotic woman with depression. The diva is angry with her, the older actor forgets the text, the producer is not sober even when she sleeps and, to top it all off, a group of emos try to beat up the technicians.

== Cast ==
The actors participating in this film are:

- Irene Azuela as Julia
- Karina Gidi as Isi
- Rebecca Jones as Amanda
- Fernando Luján as Fernando
- Ricardo Blume as Eduardo
- Martín Altomaro as Adrián
- Moisés Arizmendi as Óscar
- Derik Dean as Alan
- Alfonso Dosal as Ángel
- Eduardo España as Poquemón
- Jorge Adrián Espíndola as Parra
- Anabel Ferreira as Geo
- Kristyan Ferrer as Nachito
- Mauricio García Lozano as Collonier
- Silvia Pinal as Delegate
- Irineo Alvarez
- Alejandra Bogue
- Maika Bernard
- Luis Couturier
- Julieta Egurrola
- Ana Ofelia Murguía
- Regina Orozco

== Production ==
Principal photography was taken between December 2011 and January 2012 at the UNAM University Cultural Center.

== Release ==
The Last Call had its world premiere in March 2013 at the 28th Guadalajara International Film Festival. It had its commercial premiere on October 4, 2013, in Mexican theaters.

== Reception ==
=== Critical reception ===
Claudia Llaca from Cine Premiere wrote: "Thanks to an impeccable script and excellent stage direction, Franco achieves the right rhythm so that the actors not only interact, but also give the best of their talent to the film... Third call is a well made film, with art, craft and intelligence. It is part of the Mexican cinema that is worth seeing and supporting."

=== Accolades ===
Year	Award / Festival	Category	Recipient	Result	Ref.
2013	Guadalajara International Film Festival	Audience Award at Infinitum	Francisco Franco	Won	
2013	Guadalajara International Film Festival	Best Mexican Fiction Feature Film	Francisco Franco	Won	
2013	Guadalajara International Film Festival	Best Actress	Cecilia Suárez	Won	
2013	Havana Film Festival	Best Editing	Mariana Rodríguez	Won	
2014	Diosas de Plata	Best Film	Francisco Franco	Nominated	
2014	Diosas de Plata	Best Screenplay	Francisco Franco & María Renée Prudencio	Nominated	
2014	Diosas de Plata	Best Supporting Actor	Fernando Luján	Won	
2014	Diosas de Plata	Best Supporting Actress	Mariana Treviño	Nominated	
2014	Diosas de Plata	Best Supporting Actress	Anabel Ferreira	Nominated	
2014	Diosas de Plata	Best Actor in a Minor Role	Ricardo Blume	Won	
2014	Diosas de Plata	Best Actress in a Minor Role	Silvia Pinal	Nominated	
2014	Palm Springs International Film Festival	Latino Film Award	Francisco Franco	Nominated	
2014	Ariel Awards	Best Director	Francisco Franco	Nominated	
2014	Ariel Awards	Best Adapted Screenplay	Francisco Franco & María Renée Prudencio	Won	
2014	Ariel Awards	Best Supporting Actor	Ricardo Blume	Nominated	
2014	Ariel Awards	Best Supporting Actress	Rebecca Jones	Nominated	
2014	Ariel Awards	Best Editing	Mariana Rodríguez	Nominated	
2014	Ariel Awards	Best Sound	Matías Barberis, Pablo Tamez & Jaime Baksht	Nominated	
2014	Ariel Awards	Best Costume Design	Adela Cortazar & Jerildy Bosch	Nominated	
2014	Ariel Awards	Best Makeup	Iñaki Legaspi	Nominated	
