= What a Wonderful World (film) =

- Romanian: Ce Lume Minunată
- Directed by: Anatol Durbală
- Written by: Anatol Durbală
- Produced by: Cumatrenco Sergiu
- Starring: Igor Babiac; Sergiu Bitca; Igor Caras-Romanov; Ana Daud
- Cinematography: Ivan Grincenco
- Music by: Roman Bordei
- Production company: YOUBESC
- Distributed by: AO Asociatia Consumatorilor de Arta
- Release date: 4 April 2014
- Running time: 73 minutes
- Country: Moldova
- Languages: Romanian, English

What a Wonderful World (Romanian: Ce Lume Minunată) is a 2014 Moldovan film directed and written by Anatol Durbală, set during the April 2009 Moldovan parliamentary election protests.

== Plot ==
A 22-year-old Moldovan comes home from Boston, Massachusetts and finds himself in the midst of a major protest.

== Reception ==
The jury wishes to acknowledge a director whose feature début shows much promise with an urgency and intensity in its storytelling out of a country with virtually no film industry since its independence in 1991. A deceptively spare take on a wrong-place-at-the-wrong-time scenario, the film deftly weaves events of a violent populist uprising by the young generation whose time has come to display their rage and mistrust of a corrupt and backward-looking government, leading to a shocking climax for its unwitting protagonist.

— Warsaw Film Festival award citation

At the 2014 Warsaw Film Festival, Durbală won the FIPRESCI Prize. At the 2015 Independent Film Festival Boston it won Best Director, Best Foreign Film and Best Writing awards. Controversially, the film was not submitted for the Academy Award for Best Foreign Language Film, despite Moldova submitting films in the two previous years; this was presumed to be because the political content was embarrassing to the Moldovan government.
