= Conversations on Serious Topics =

2012 film

- Film poster
- Directed by: Giedrė Beinoriūtė
- Written by: Giedrė Beinoriūtė
- Release date: 2012
- Running time: 65 minutes
- Country: Lithuania
- Language: Lithuanian

Conversations on Serious Topics (Lithuanian: Pokalbiai rimtomis temomis) is a 2012 Lithuanian documentary film directed by Giedrė Beinoriūtė. The film was selected as the Lithuanian entry for the Best Foreign Language Film at the 86th Academy Awards, but it was not nominated.

== See also ==
- List of submissions to the 86th Academy Awards for Best Foreign Language Film
- List of Lithuanian submissions for the Academy Award for Best Foreign Language Film
