= All God's Children (2012 film) =

2012 film

- Film poster
- Directed by: Adrian Popovici
- Written by: Adrian Popovici
- Starring: Paolo Seganti
- Cinematography: Veaceslav Cebotari
- Release date: 19 October 2012 (Romania)
- Running time: 90 minutes
- Country: Moldova
- Languages: Romanian; Italian

All God's Children (Romanian: Toti copiii domnului) is a 2012 Moldovan drama film directed by Adrian Popovici. The film was selected as the Moldovan entry for the Best Foreign Language Film at the 86th Academy Awards, but was not nominated. It was the first time the country submitted a film in this category.

The film narrates the story of Irina and Peter, a couple who lost their young child in an accident. The couple moves to Moldova and adopts Pavalas, a child that reminds them of their late son. In order to adopt the child, Irina and her friend travel to Italy where they get caught in a network of prostitution and crime that will test her resolve and love for the child.

== Cast ==
- Jhoni Alici as The Bartender
- Lilia Bejan as The Maid
- Ion Beregoi as Gicu
- Vas Blackwood as Mark
- Emergian Cazac as Pavalas
- Anatol Durbală as Feghea
- Arcel Ioseliani as Soldier #1
- Michael Ironside as Peter
- Alexei Machevnin as Soldier #2
- Rodica Oanta as Tatiana
- Leo Rudenco as Moustache Man
- Paolo Seganti as Bruno
- Mihaela Strambeanu as School Director
- Ina Surdu as Irina
- Alina Turcanu as Alina

== See also ==
- List of submissions to the 86th Academy Awards for Best Foreign Language Film
- List of Moldovan submissions for the Academy Award for Best Foreign Language Film
