= The Wooden Cannon =

- Romanian: Tunul de lemn
- Directed by: Vasile Brescanu
- Written by: Nicolae Esinencu
- Starring: Veronica Grigoraș, Vasile Tăbîrță, Georgy Chulkov, Sica Esinencu, Mikhail Kirianov
- Cinematography: Ivan Pozdnyakov
- Edited by: E. Burlescu
- Music by: Vlad Druc
- Production company: Moldova-Film
- Release date: 1986
- Running time: 73 minutes
- Country: Soviet Union
- Languages: Romanian, Russian

The Wooden Cannon (Romanian: Tunul de lemn) is a 1986 Soviet drama film directed by Vasile Brescanu.

== Plot ==
The movie follows the life of an elderly man, David, who lives with his daughter-in-law, Maria, in their rural home by an unspecified body of water. Maria's husband, Andrei, is a soldier fighting in World War II, and it is shown that the two have not received any news from him in some time.

A German bomber plane flies over David and Maria's home daily and disrupts their livelihoods, having already killed their livestock and threatening to destroy their house. David attempts to bargain, even offering that Maria undress for the Germans in exchange for their house being left alone. These negotiations eventually fall through, and the man seeks help to destroy the plane. He manages to find and bring home a cannon but inadvertently launches the cannon's only projectile at the house, nearly causing it to collapse.

Maria takes to building a catapult (the titular wooden "cannon") to hit the plane's fuel tank with a rock launched as a projectile, thereby causing the plane to crash. This attempt also proves unsuccessful, with the catapult missing its target. Frustrated, David places several gas barrels inside the house and digs a trench surrounding it, filling it with gasoline. When the plane next flies over the house, David fires the gas inside the trench. The house, however, fails to explode. In a panic, David takes some burning hay and throws it inside the house, causing it to explode and destroy the plane. David, however, dies in the process.

The movie ends with a pregnant Maria rebuilding the house and tending to the land. Andrei is revealed to have died on the battlefield, and the narrator is revealed to be Maria's son.

== Production ==
- Script - Nicolae Esinescu
- Director - Vasile Brescanu
- Cinematography - Ivan Pozdnyakov
- Scenography - Igor Grigorishchenko
- Music - Vlad Druc

== Cast ==
- Vasile Tăbîrță as David
- Veronica Grigoraș as Maria
- Ioana Ciomârtan as Dochia
- Sebastian Papaiani as Saint Peter
- Georgy Chulkov
- Vasily Lisenkov
- Sica Esinescu
- Mikhail Kirianov
