= Umbre =

Romanian crime drama television series

- Genre: Crime; Drama
- Created by: Bogdan Mirică; Igor Cobileanski
- Composer: Adam Balazs
- Country of origin: Romania
- Original language: Romanian
- No. of seasons: 3
- No. of episodes: 21

Production
- Running time: 41-59 minutes
- Production companies: HBO Europe; Multi Media Est Romania

Original release
- Network: HBO Romania
- Release: December 28, 2014 – December 25, 2019

Umbre (English: Shadows) is a Romanian crime drama television series produced by HBO Europe and directed by Bogdan Mirică and Igor Cobileanski. It is the first HBO Europe original series to be broadcast in the United States and the first TV series to be screened at the Transilvania International Film Festival. The second season was nominated for the Best TV CEE Series award at the Serial Killer festival.

The second season premiered on 12 November 2017 in 19 countries. In September 2018, it was announced that the series had been renewed for a third season consisting of 7 episodes, with filming to begin in Fall On October 10, 2019, it was announced that the premiere date for the third season is November 20. The entire third season will be streamed on HBO Go on November 20 while on TV it will be aired weekly.

== Plot ==
Umbre follows Relu (Șerban Pavlu), an enforcer for a small-time Romanian mob boss (Doru Ana), as he struggles to keep his family in the dark about his job. The series starts off when Relu out on a mission accidentally kills a man. Day by day, the secrets he keeps become increasingly oppressive and the lies begin to surface, one by one.

== Characters ==
AUREL “RELU” ONCESCU (Serban Pavlu)

Relu is a family man and a reliable friend. He is married to Gina with whom he has two children, Chuckie and Magda. They're living together with Uncle Puiu, who, although not a relative, is treated as a member of their family.

Seen through the eyes of his family, Relu Oncescu seems to be an ordinary taxi driver. No one suspects that he's actually working as an enforcer for The Captain, a local mobster. In order to provide his family with a better life, Relu recovers money from debtors and in order to be successful, most often than not, he has to resort to threats and violence.

Because he is neither criminal nor a psychopath, he has never managed to advance in the hierarchy, always doing the others' dirty work. After accidentally killing a man, he tries to get out of the underworld, but he cannot find a way back, and his life will change forever.

GINA ONCESCU (Maria Obretin)

Gina is Relu's wife, an extremely loyal woman who gave up any personal aspirations in order to devote herself completely to her husband and two children. She loves her husband passionately after many years of marriage and she's ready to do anything to protect her family. She is a skilled housewife, focused on everyday work: cooking, washing, ironing, cleaning and maintaining the flame of passion alive in her relationship. When she finds out that her husband is leading a double life and has lied to her for years, her universe crumbles and her reactions become unpredictable.

UNCLE PUIU (Ștefan Velniciuc)

Uncle Puiu is a member of Relu's family. He's living in the same backyard with the Oncescu family, in a modest room that still bears traces of his tumultuous life. He's ready to do everything for Relu, Gina and their children. In his youth, he used to be one of the elite players of one of the most important clans of the underworld but, on the surface, he's been retired for years without losing the esteem of the current bosses. He is the only one who knows about Relu's double life and he covers for him every time. Despite his old age, he still goes to the old sentimental prostitutes he used to protect.

Uncle Puiu is Relu's mentor and the unofficial grandfather of his children.

NICOLETA (NICO) (Andreea Vasile)

Nico is The Captain's (Relu's boss) right hand and the one coordinating the enforcers. She owns a pub which is named after her and where she hosts the meetings of the local mobsters. Nico is a product of this world and she made her way up in the hierarchy carefully and skillfully: she dresses provocatively and she's always top notch. She has a weakness for Relu but, despite all her efforts, he is not interested.

THE CAPTAIN (Doru Ana)

The Captain is the brain behind all the illegal operations and he is respected and feared by the entire underworld. He knows everything that happens and he's rarely caught by surprise. He's a megalomaniac, apparently full of charisma and affection when, in fact, he exhibits boundless cruelty and an enormous appetite for life manifested in everlasting parties which he organizes as rewards for his "boys". He does not trust anyone and easily betrays his partners.

His only sorrow is caused by Teddy, his only son, who does not live up to his expectations and whom he considers too weak to ever follow in his footsteps.

CHUCKIE (Dan Hurduc)

Relu and Gina's younger son and Uncle Puiu's favourite. Chuckie is a quiet and clever boy, who loves dinosaurs and who has all the data to become a very good swimmer. He seldom worries his parents. However, when there are problems in the family, the youngest member's reactions are surprising.

MAGDA (Mădălina Craiu)

Magda is an intelligent young woman who dreams about being independent though her much too severe father holds her on a tight leash. Always fighting with him, Magda will do her best to ignore him and his decisions.

TEDDY (Gabriel Huian)

The Captain's only son has passions which seem unacceptable for his local mafia boss of a father: he's listening to classical music, he's an avid reader and he speaks perfect Romanian, often correcting those he comes in contact with. After he meets Relu for the first time, their destinies merge and Teddy shows he's capable of unexpected gestures and decisions.

SABIN (Sergiu Costache)

Sabin is one of The Captain's boys and he's often sent into missions with Relu. Unlike Relu, however, Sabin has a tough physique and personality and he's vindictive and cruel. He envies Relu for the latter's relationship with The Captain and suspects that there is something between Relu and Nico, for whom he has strong feelings.

TOMA (Dorel Vișan)

The most powerful and most feared underworld figure, Toma is the only one who can impose conditions on The Captain. He lets the latter wait for him or he shows up when least expected because his status allows it.

== Episodes ==
=== Season 1 (2014-15) ===
Relu (Șerban Pavlu) is a family man. He has a wife, two children and he leads a double life.

Seen through the eyes of his family, Relu Oncescu seems to be an ordinary taxi driver. No one suspects that Relu works as a collector for Căpitanu’, a local mobster.

Neither of the worlds (family and Mafia) he is living in knows about the other. Relu manages to keep everything under control, but not for long. After he accidentally kills a man, he tries to escape the underground world, but he is not able to find a way out.

With each passing day the secrets become more and more overwhelming and the lies start coming to light one by one.

No. overall	No. in season	Title	Directed by	Written by	Original release date
1	1	"Episodul 1"	Igor Cobileanski	Bogdan Mirică	December 28, 2014
For Relu, who works as a taxi driver, it’s a day like any other. But Relu is not just a normal taxi driver. He is also a debt collector working for Căpitanu, the local mafia boss. At the beginning he tries to recover the money in a civilized manner, but in the end he has to get physical with the debtors. After he ends his lap and hands the money to Nico - the right hand of his boss - Relu finds out he has some money to squeeze from Giani and goes with Sabin in this quest, but things get complicated soon.
2	2	"Episodul 2"	Igor Cobileanski	Bogdan Mirică	December 28, 2014
After a discussion in the park, Nico asks Relu to recover a group of prostitutes who are under Căpitanu's protection. The girls were attacked and seized. Relu is forced to take Teddy and even if it’s obvious that he doesn’t like the boss’ son, he has no choice. Eventually, the boy is proving to be extremely helpful. Gina spends the afternoon with her children as she visits their neighbor Codrin, who seems like a really nice guy; Teddy finds out where Relu lives and meets his daughter, Magda. Mr. Puiu has a feeling that something is wrong.
3	3	"Episodul 3"	Igor Cobileanski	Bogdan Mirică	January 4, 2015
When Teddy tags along with Relu to take care of ”business” again, Căpitanu is pleased with the results: Teddy has shown that he can handle it. A very important meeting takes place between Mr. Toma and Căpitanu '; they are plotting a major operation. Relu must recover some money from a doctor and they visit him at the office, but things get complicated and Nico is dissatisfied with the result. Teddy and Magda seem to like each other, although Relu doesn’t like this situation; he forbids Teddy to see her again. Gina finds a box full of jewelry by accident and a major scandal triggers in Oncescu family. At the last minute Mr. Puiu comes in and saves the day.
4	4	"Episodul 4"	Igor Cobileanski	Bogdan Mirică	January 11, 2015
Gina finds out what her husband really does for a living. Suspicious Gina follows Relu just to discover he is meeting a woman at a gym, but fails to unravel her identity. Tănase barely convinces Relu to participate in an illegal act, but as of precaution, he backs out just a few moments before. On the way to the wedding he was invited along with Gina, Relu makes a sudden stop to save Tănase and his colleague. The situation gets out of hand when a man is thrown on the hood of the cab where Gina was waiting for Relu.
5	5	"Episodul 5"	Bogdan Mirică	Bogdan Mirică	January 18, 2015
For the Oncescu family things start falling apart. Relu can’t go home anymore and spends his nights in pubs. Magda is waiting messages from Teddy in vain, Chuckie takes refuge in practicing karate moves, Mr. Puiu refuses to leave his room and Gina smokes like a chimney. The Doctor makes an unannounced visit to Relu’s home where he finds Gina and discovers that he has a wife and children. Following a discussion with Căpitanu, Relu finds out that he is displeased with his services and in the future Relu will have to execute some tasks for free. He gets a new task: to recover some money from a senator in Constanța. Although initially things seem to be taken care of, the result is quite different than they expected.
6	6	"Episodul 6"	Bogdan Mirică	Bogdan Mirică	January 25, 2015
Mr. Puiu has some memory problems and decides to pay the doctor a visit, a good friend of his; he discovers some unsettling things. At school, Chuckie is challenged by a classmate, gets into a fight with him and things get out of control. The principal calls Relu and Gina to school and they unite to defend their boy. During a meeting with the boys, Căpitanu finds out that Relu didn‘t finish a certain job and gets very angry. Wanting to warn Relu, Teddy looks for Magda and so the two get to see each other after a long time. Mr. Puiu pays Relu a visit and he confesses that he wants to get out of the mobster’s world to take care of his family. Căpitanu is looking for Relu and Nico is accused of defending him. Mr. Puiu gets into a big mess, without anyone suspecting anything, while Relu brings his cab to the car service.
7	7	"Episodul 7"	Igor Cobileanski	Bogdan Mirică	February 1, 2015
Mr. Puiu is on the mobster’s blacklist and everyone is looking for him. Meanwhile he surprises Chuckie. Relu has returned home and he decides to change his life. When Relu goes to see Căpitanu in the hospital, he finds out that his boss has been watching him for a long time and that he and his family are in danger. His only chance is finding Mr. Puiu and getting back the stolen money. After Relu talks to Nico, he decides to try one last thing and he gets ready for the most complex operation to date. Gina discovers what Mr.Puiu has given Chuckie.
8	8	"Episodul 8"	Igor Cobileanski	Bogdan Mirică	February 8, 2015
After he almost lost his life, Relu returns home and he finds out that the money taken from Căpitanu are in his house. When Teddy visits his father in the hospital, he learns that Relu is in danger and he rushes to find Magda. He asks her to run away with him, but he discovers something that changes everything. Nico manages to get rid of Sabin with the help of the police. Looking for Relu, Toma’s boys find out that the whole family has moved. When Relu goes to see Căpitanu determined to kill him, his family is there: Magda and Teddy have a big surprise for them all. Căpitanu is told that Mr. Puiu had been found.

=== Season 2 (2017) ===
Relu Oncescu and his wife, Gina, are separated. Relu's two lives are violently intertwined. Their daughter marries The Captain's son, The Captain being the mobster Relu works for. The young couple are expecting a child. Old quarrels are catching up with the children and the parents. Everything has a price in the underground world.

Time has passed by and the affairs of The Captain's clan have become increasingly more important and thus more suspicious in the eyes of a prosecutor who wants to nail them. Everything is threatened. Relu wants to get revenge and nothing will stand in his way. He is ready to sacrifice everything to seek justice.

No. overall	No. in season	Title	Directed by	Written by	Original release date
9	1	"Episodul 1"	Bogdan Mirică	Bogdan Mirică	November 12, 2017
A wedding is taking place at Snagov Club: Magda, Relu’s daughter, is marrying Teddy, The Captain’s son. Meanwhile, in a parking lot, an incident involving a truck driver and a mystery man occurs. After the party, the newlyweds, who are expecting a baby, take off in the new car, a wedding gift, for the honeymoon, to unexpected consequences.
10	2	"Episodul 2"	Igor Cobileanski	Bogdan Mirică	November 19, 2017
Magda and Teddy are trying to get their life back on track after the shocking event they went through. Relu starts looking for clues that could lead him to the truth about the accident. He and The Captain agree to seek justice on their own and be one step ahead of the police.
11	3	"Episodul 3"	Igor Cobileanski	Bogdan Mirică	November 26, 2017
Through less orthodox ways, Relu quickly manages to discover a vital piece of information that takes him closer to finding out the name of the person who has the answers to all his questions. Teddy gets involved in Relu’s revenge and the brutal experience works for the boy like an initiation in a violent world where one pays for everything and no one gets out unharmed.
12	4	"Episodul 4"	Bogdan Mirică	Bogdan Mirică	December 3, 2017
On his path to revenge, Relu gets into a confrontation with one of the most powerful mobsters, Nea Toma. As everything has a price in the underground world, Relu will not rest until justice is done. Emilian, an ambitious and unscrupulous policeman, starts working on the Captain’s case. Gina, now divorced, gets closer and closer to her new boss, Sebastian.
13	5	"Episodul 5"	Bogdan Mirică	Bogdan Mirică	December 10, 2017
Fearing that his affairs are endangered, The Captain demands some answers from Relu, who is not ready to reveal his findings. Gina tries to get by without her husband’s help. Magda starts to have second thoughts about her marriage. Without much guidance from his parents, Chuckie gets in trouble with the police. Emilian is determined to put the Captain and his people behind bars for good, and Nico, to save her own skin, is ready to do anything.
14	6	"Episodul 6"	Bogdan Mirică	Bogdan Mirică	December 17, 2017
After going through yet another ordeal, Teddy and Magda have a heart to heart. Driven by his thirst to prove his power, Emilian finds out some inside information that helps him close in on Relu and The Captain who have set up a huge criminal endeavour. It seems that there is no way out and Relu’s world will fall apart.

=== Season 3 (2019) ===
On May 14, 2019, it was announced that the filming for the third season has ended and that the series would return in the fall. The first episode of the third season premiered at the Transilvania International Film Festival on June 6. The third season will premiere on November 20 and it will have 7 episodes.

After coming face to face with Emilian last season, the third Umbre installment sees Relu engaging in the full-on hunt deployed against him, using anything, and anyone, to stay one step ahead of his nemesis. It's not just his own freedom that's on the line, but the entire empire of his mobster family, which is now on track to go global. While The Captain is striving to hold on to the business, his brother Nicu steers it into international waters, with Relu's help. Nico has become a pawn on the chessboard where Emilian and Relu try to outwit each other, and playing both sides will wear them to a frazzle this season. Relu's family is unraveling and, with Gina seeing Sebastian, Chuckie spiraling out of control, and Magda coming to grips with the loss of her baby, there's no thread in sight to pull it back together. Is Relu even trying to anymore?

No. overall	No. in season	Title	Directed by	Written by	Original release date
15	1	"Episodul 1"	Bogdan Mirică	Bogdan Mirică	November 20, 2019
A few days after the events of season 2, the Captain’s team is on alert, but Nicu isn’t ready to give up his plans to expand, because of the police. Magda and Teddy are trying to rebuild their relationship. Emilian is pressured by Andronache to make arrests and in his turn, he pressures Nico. Relu and Nicu are visiting Nico in the middle of the night and they sketch a risky plan.
16	2	"Episodul 2"	Bogdan Mirică	Bogdan Mirică	November 20, 2019
17	3	"Episodul 3"	Bogdan Mirică	Bogdan Mirică	2019
18	4	"Episodul 4"	Bogdan Mirică	Bogdan Mirică	2019
19	5	"Episodul 5"	Bogdan Mirică	Bogdan Mirică	2019
20	6	"Episodul 6"	Bogdan Mirică	Bogdan Mirică	2019
21	7	"Episodul 7"	Bogdan Mirică	Bogdan Mirică	2019

== Production ==
The first season of Umbre is based on Small Time Gangster, an Australian comedy series, while the second season is completely original. There was an almost three-year gap between season one and two because Bogdan Mirica directed his debut feature film Dogs, which was awarded the FIPRESCI Prize in 2016 Cannes Un Certain Regard. The second season features 6 episodes but of greater length (almost one hour per episode, compared to 45 minutes in the first season). The Visual effects for the second season are created by Stargate Studios, company that produces visual effects for The Walking Dead, among other TV series.

== Broadcast ==
Umbre premiered in Romania on 28 December 2014 (HBO Romania). On 9 November 2015 it premiered on Acorn TV, making it the first HBO Europe original series to be broadcast in the United States. In 2017, the first season of Umbre was acquired by Amazon Prime and Hulu for streaming. The second season premiered at the 2018 Transilvania International Film Festival, marking the first television series to be screened at this film festival and on 12 November 2017 it had its TV premiere in 19 European countries where HBO operates: Romania, Poland, Bulgaria, Hungary, Croatia, Moldova, Macedonia, Czech Republic, Montenegro, Macedonia, Serbia, Slovenia, Slovakia, Bosnia and Herzegovina, and also Denmark, Sweden, Norway, Finland and Spain.
