= Blind Intersections =

2012 film

- Directed by: Lara Saba
- Written by: Nibal Arakji
- Starring: Ghida Nouri
- Cinematography: Michael Lagerwey
- Release date: 2012 (Beirut IFF)
- Running time: 90 minutes
- Country: Lebanon
- Language: Arabic

Blind Intersections is a 2012 Lebanese drama film directed by Lara Saba. The film was selected as the Lebanese entry for the Best Foreign Language Film at the 86th Academy Awards, but it was not nominated.

== Cast ==
- Ghida Nouri as Nour
- Alae Hamoud as Marwan
- Charbel Ziade as Malek

== See also ==
- List of submissions to the 86th Academy Awards for Best Foreign Language Film
- List of Lebanese submissions for the Academy Award for Best Foreign Language Film
