= Nicoleta Esinencu =

Moldovan playwright and director

Nicoleta Esinencu is a playwright and director born in 1978 in Chişinău, Moldova. She became famous as a result of her 2005 monologue FUCK YOU, Eu.ro.Pa, which generated controversy in Romania and Moldova. She worked in a theatre in Chişinău before founding her own company and has directed plays across Europe.

== Early life ==
Esinencu was born in 1978 in Chişinău, Moldova. Her parents were Antonina Esinencu and Nicolae Esinencu. She studied theatre and stage design at the Moldovan Academy of Music, Theatre and Fine Arts.

== Career ==
Esinencu writes about her country, a post-communist state now part of Europe. In collaboration with Mihai Fusu and Dumitru Crudu, Esinencu wrote the play A şaptea cafanã (The Seventh Coffee House) and toured it around festivals in 2001. She then worked at the Eugen Ionescu Theatre in Chișinău and founded an alternative theatre venue called Teatru Spălătorie (Laundry Theatre), which closed in 2018. She has directed various projects at the Hebbel am Ufer in Berlin. Her 2018 play Rest of Europe premiered at the Schauspielhaus in Graz.

Esinencu drew attention with her monologue FUCK YOU, Eu.ro.Pa in 2005, winning the Romanian Dramacum theatre award. Framed as a daughter telling her father why she does not want to enter a Moldovan essay writing competition, it triggered controversy in Romania and Moldova for its frank discussion of post-communism, Moldovan society and the idea of Europe. This led to Esinencu being referred to as the "angry voice of Moldova". The performances in Moldova were renamed Stop Europe; nobody under 16 was permitted to attend and the text has not been released in Moldova.

== Selected works ==
- Esinencu, Nicoleta (2013). ŠIZOfreedom. Wien. ISBN 9783950343250.
