= Nicolae Esinencu =

Nicolae Esinencu OR
- Born: Nicolae Esinencu; August 13, 1940; Chițcani, Moldavian SSR, Soviet Union
- Died: April 25, 2016 (aged 76); Chișinău, Moldova
- Education: Maxim Gorky Literature Institute
- Occupations: Screenwriter; writer
- Children: 4, including Nicoleta Esinencu

Nicolae Esinencu (13 August 1940 – 25 April 2016) was a Moldovan poet, screenwriter and writer. He was born in Chiţcani, in the Teleneşti district of Moldova, which was then part of the Moldavian Soviet Socialist Republic.

Esinencu attended the Maxim Gorky Literature Institute in Moscow between 1971 and 1975, then his first writing credit was for co-writing the screenplay for Vlad Ioviță's 1975 film Calul, pușca și nevasta. The two then collaborated on other projects. In 2010, friends organised a celebration for his seventieth birthday and true to his reputation as a "terrible child" he did not turn up. He was a member of the Moldovan Writers' Union and the Writers' Union of Romania. He died on April 25, 2016.

== Selected writings ==
- Antene (1968)
- Sacla (1968)
- Sens (1969)
- Portocala (1970)
- Toi (1972)
- Dealuri (1974)
- Era vremea să iubim (1977)
- Copilul teribil (1979)
- Stai să-ți mai spun (1983)
- Cuvinte de chemat fetele (1986)

== Filmography ==
- Calul, pușca și nevasta (co-written with Vlad Ioviță; 1975)
- Făt-Frumos (2 episodes; 1977)
- Căruța (short film; 1978)
- La porțile Satanei (co-written with Vlad Ioviță; 1980)
- Tunul de lemn (1986)
- Tălpile verzi (short film; 1987)
- Adio, viață de holtei (short film; 1988)
