= The Unsaved =

2013 film

- Film poster
- Romanian: La limita de jos a cerului
- Directed by: Igor Cobileanski
- Written by: Igor Cobileanski; Corneliu Porumboiu
- Starring: Igor Babiac
- Release date: 1 July 2013 (Karlovy)
- Running time: 80 minutes
- Countries: Romania; Moldova
- Language: Romanian

The Unsaved (Romanian: La limita de jos a cerului; literally "At the lower limit of the sky") is a 2013 Moldovan drama film directed by Igor Cobileanski. It was selected as the Moldovan entry for the Best Foreign Language Film at the 87th Academy Awards, but was not nominated.

== Cast ==
- Igor Babiac as Viorel
- Ela Ionescu as Maria
- Sergiu Voloc as Gasca

== See also ==
- List of submissions to the 87th Academy Awards for Best Foreign Language Film
- List of Moldovan submissions for the Academy Award for Best Foreign Language Film
