= Giedrė Beinoriūtė =

Lithuanian filmmaker (born 1976)

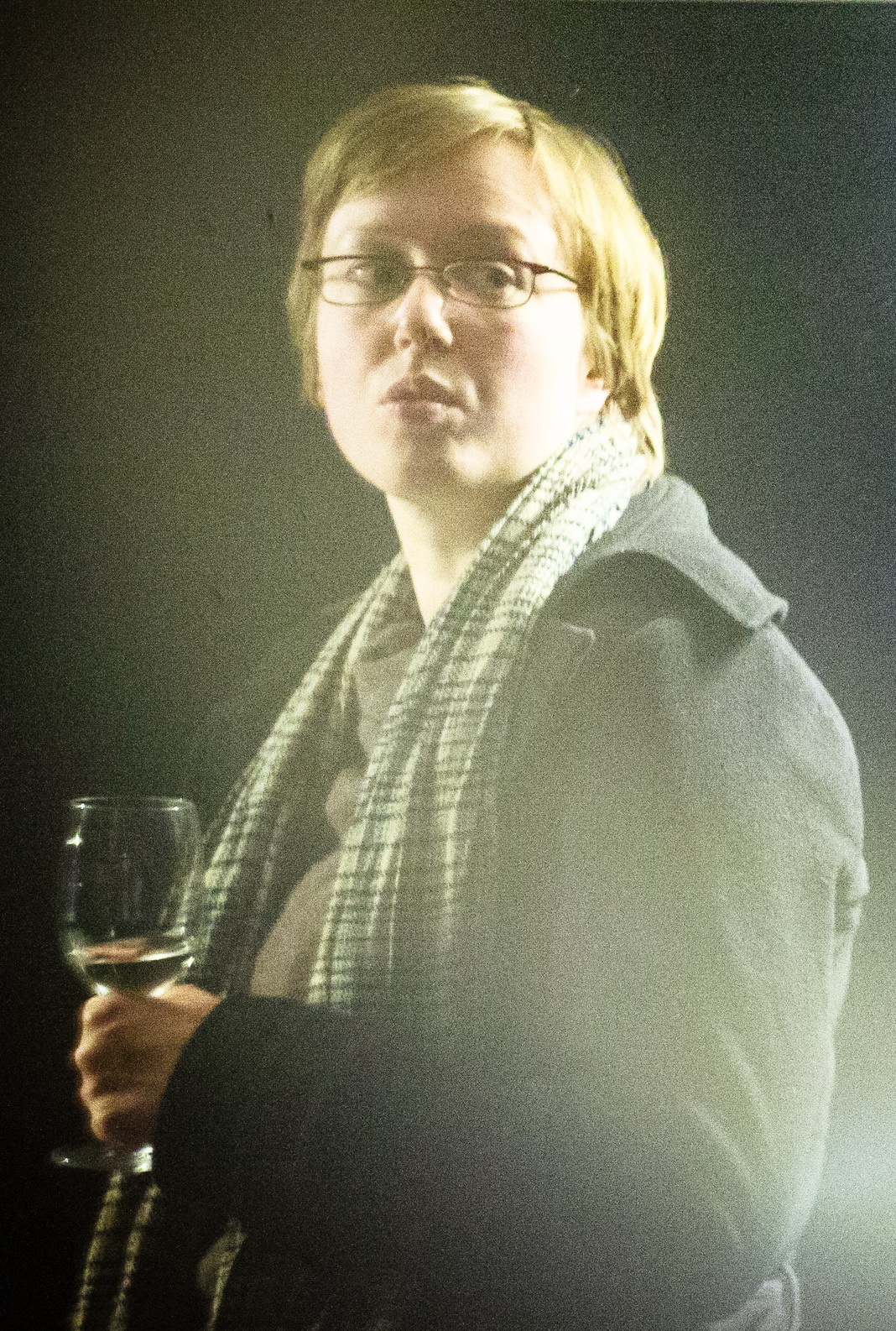
- Born: 23 August 1976 (age 49); Vilnius, Lithuania
- Occupation: Filmmaker
- Years active: 1997 – present

Giedrė Beinoriūtė (born August 23, 1976) is a Lithuanian filmmaker, screenwriter, producer and co-founder of a film studio "Monoklis".

== Career ==
In 1995, Giedrė Beinoriūtė started studying cinematography in Lithuanian Academy of Music and Theatre and received her bachelor's degree in 1999. After that she continued her studies and in 2002 received her master's degree. While studying in the university she had an opportunity to work with prominent Lithuanian directors Šarūnas Bartas and Andrius Matelis. During her study years she directed a play “Love from the Last Sight” and also wrote plays for the radio.

Giedrė has been creating films since 1997.

During 2001–2007, she worked as a volunteer for the children telephone counseling service “Child Line” where she had much experience talking with children, which later on is reflected in some of her documentaries.

In 2004, she became a member of Lithuanian Filmmakers Union. In 2006 together with her colleagues Antanas Gluskinas and Jurga Gluskinienė started a film studio called "Monoklis". She continues working there, trying to fulfill the main goal of the company which is to "produce creative documentary, fiction and experimental films". Since 2007 Giedrė Beinoriūtė works as a lecturer in Lithuanian Academy of Music and Theatre.

== Filmography ==
=== Shorts ===
- My Lonely Friends (Mano vienišos draugės, 1997)
- Mom, Dad, Brother, Sister (Mama, tėtė, brolis, sesė, 1999)
- The Balcony (Balkonas, 2008)
- Temporarily (Laikinai, 2011)

=== Documentaries ===
- Trolleybus City (Troleibusų miestas, 2002)
- Existence (Egzistencija, 2004)
- Vulkanovka. After the Big Cinema (Vulkanovka. Po didžiojo kino, 2005)
- Grandpa and Grandma (Gyveno senelis ir bobutė, 2007)
- Field of the Miracles (Stebuklų laukas, 2011)
- The Specialist (Specialistė, 2012)
- Conversations on Serious Topics (Pokalbiai rimtomis temomis, 2012)

== Awards and nominations ==
- Honorable mention in "Curtas Vila do Conde" film festival for Vulkanovka. After the Big Cinema (Portugal, 2005).
- Ministry of Culture debut prize for Existence and Vulkanovka. After the Big Cinema (Lithuania, 2006)
- Best documentary film award in category "Human rights" for Grandpa and Grandma in international film festival „СТУПЕНИ“ (Kyiv, Ukraine, 2007).
- Lithuanian Filmmakers Union award „for the authentic relation with the reality“ in documentary film category (Lithuania, 2007)
- Sidabrinė gervė award for The Balcony (Lithuania, 2009)
- Sidabrinė gervė award for the best full feature documentary film The Field of Magic (director: Mindaugas Survila, producers: Jurga Gluskinienė and Giedrė Beinoriūtė, Lithuania, 2012)
