= Igor Cobileanski =

Moldovan film director

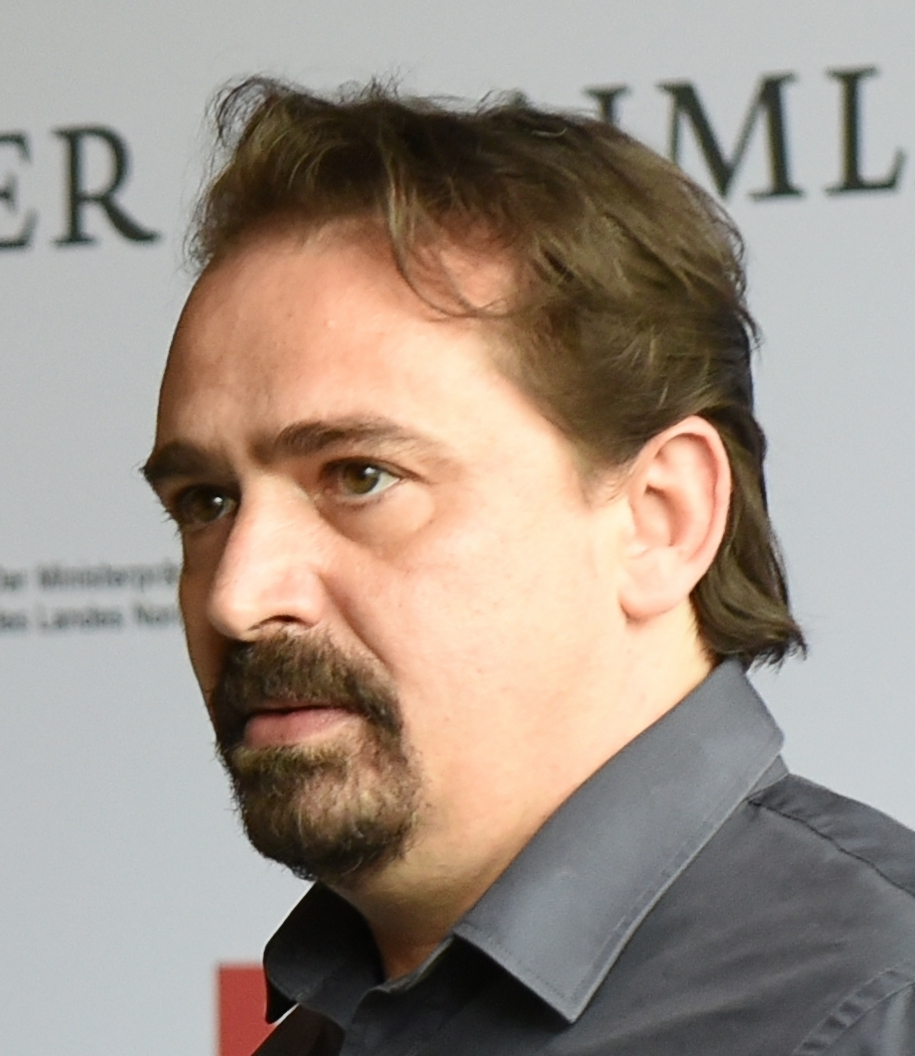
- Cobileanski in 2019
- Born: Igor Cobileanski; 24 February 1974 (age 52); Comrat, Moldavian SSR, Soviet Union
- Occupations: Director, screenwriter, actor
- Years active: 1988–present

Igor Cobileanski (born 24 February 1974) is a Moldovan film director. He was born in Comrat.

== Filmography ==
- Când se stinge lumina (2005)
- Sasa, Grisa și Ion (2006)
- Plictis și inspiratie (2007)
- Tache (2008)
- Colecția de arome (2013)
- The Unsaved (2013, director)
- Umbre (8 episodes, 2014–2015)
- Afacerea Est (2016)
- Practica (2017)
- Hackerville (2018)
- Comatogen (2025)

== See also ==
- Moldova-Film
