= Club Sandwich (film) =

2013 film

- Film poster
- Directed by: Fernando Eimbcke
- Written by: Fernando Eimbcke
- Produced by: Christian Valdelièvre
- Starring: Lucio Giménez Cacho
- Cinematography: María Secco
- Release date: 7 September 2013 (TIFF)
- Running time: 82 minutes
- Country: Mexico
- Language: Spanish

Club Sandwich (Spanish: Club Sándwich) is a 2013 Mexican comedy film written and directed by Fernando Eimbcke. It was screened in the Contemporary World Cinema section at the 2013 Toronto International Film Festival. It won the Golden Shell at the 2013 San Sebastián film festival. This film, translated into Russian by Andrey Efremov, was shown in Moscow in June 2014 as part of the Moscow International Film Festival.

== Cast ==
- Lucio Giménez Cacho
- María Renée Prudencio
- Danae Reynaud
