= I Want to Be a Pilot =

- Movie poster
- Directed by: Diego Quemada-Diez
- Written by: Diego Quemada-Diez
- Produced by: Diego Quemada-Diez; Michel Ruben; Martha Sosa Elizondo; Christian Valdelièvre
- Starring: Joseph Kyalo Kioko; Collins Otieno; Gaudencia Ayuma Shichenga; Kepha Onduru, Joseph Kyalo Kioko
- Cinematography: Diego Quemada-Diez
- Edited by: Kim Bica
- Music by: Toumani Diabaté
- Release date: 22 February 2006
- Running time: 10 minutes
- Countries: Kenya; Mexico; Spain
- Language: English
- Budget: €14,000

I Want to Be a Pilot is a 2006 award-winning Kenyan - Mexican short film docufiction written and directed by Diego Quemada-Diez. The movie has earned more than 50 international prizes, including the Audience Award at the Los Angeles Film Festival and has participated in over 200 film festivals such as Sundance, Locarno, Telluride, Edinburgh, Amiens, Los Angeles, São Paulo, Manhattan, Silverdocs, Bermuda, San Francisco.

== Plot ==
The short film story tells about dreams of Omondi, a young orphan boy living in the slums of Kenya’s capital. A powerful and poetic filmic protest from a member of the crew that made The Constant Gardener. This award-winning Kenyan-Mexican short film documentary shows a poverty-stricken boy in one of the poorest parts of Kenya who looks up towards the heavens and dreams of being an airline pilot, of being able to fly. The youngster is seen sifting through the metropolitan slums' trash while a child's voice-over reads, "Sunday was my last meal." It is Wednesday today. Only the narrator, who was not an orphan himself, was chosen from among the local performers employed by director Quemada-Diez. The filmmaker describes how he was astounded when the boy—or any other youngster in that circumstance—thanked him for just listening.

== Cast ==
- Joseph Kyalo Kioko as Pastor
- Kepha Onduru as Classroom Teacher
- Collins Otieno as Omondi
- Gaudencia Ayuma Schichenga as the Nurse

== Awards and nominations ==
Year	Awarding Organisation	Category	Nominee	Result	Ref
2007	Amiens International Film Festival	Best Short Film	I Want to be a Pilot	Won	
2007	Bermuda International Film Festival	Best Short Film	I Want to be a Pilot	Won	
2007	Carrousel International du Film	Short Film	I Want to be a Pilot	Won	
2006	Heartland International Film Festival	Dramatic Short	I Want to be a Pilot	Won	
2006	Heartland International Film Festival	Best Short Film	I Want to be a Pilot	Won	
2007	Cleveland International Film Festival	Best Documentary Short Film	I Want to be a Pilot	Won	
2007	Larrissa Mediterranean Festival of New Filmmakers	Mediterranean Competition	I Want to be a Pilot	Won	
2007	Manhattan Short Film Festival	Best Film	I Want to be a Pilot	Won	
2006	São Paulo International Film Festival	Best Foreign Short Film	I Want to be a Pilot	Won	
2008	Ashland Independent Film Festival	Best Short	I Want to be a Pilot	Won	
2007	Sarasota Film Festival	Kids' Jury Award	I Want to be a Pilot	Won	
2007	Silverdocs Documentary Festivals	Honorable Mention - Short Film	I Want to be a Pilot	Won	
2006	Los Angeles Film Festival	Best Short Film	I Want to be a Pilot	Won	
2007	Alu Cine Latin Film + Media Art Festival	Best Film	I Want to be a Pilot	Won	

== See also ==
- List of Kenyan films
