= Heli (film) =

2013 Mexican crime drama film

- Theatrical release poster of Heli
- Directed by: Amat Escalante
- Written by: Amat Escalante; Gabriel Reyes
- Produced by: Jaime Romandía
- Starring: Armando Espitia; Andrea Vergara; Linda González; Juan Eduardo Palacios
- Cinematography: Lorenzo Hagerman
- Edited by: Natalia López
- Distributed by: Mantarraya
- Release dates: 15 May 2013 (Cannes); 9 August 2013 (Mexico)
- Running time: 105 minutes
- Country: Mexico
- Language: Spanish

Heli is a 2013 Mexican crime drama film directed by Amat Escalante and produced by Jaime Romandía. Featuring newcomers Armando Espitia, Andrea Vergara, Linda González, and Juan Eduardo Palacios, the film premiered in competition for the Palme d'Or at the 2013 Cannes Film Festival. Escalante won the Best Director award at the ceremony. While being appreciative of the film's technical aspects, film critics were divided in their opinion of the film itself. Heli was selected to represent Mexico at the 86th Academy Awards for Best Foreign Language Film, but it was not nominated.

== Plot ==
Heli is a young man working in a car assembly factory; he lives with his father who also works there, his wife Sabrina, his baby son Santiago and his sister Estela, who is 12 years old. His life is normal, slow, and without economic prospects, and he suffers from a troubled relationship with his wife.

Estela is revealed to be in a relationship with Beto, a cadet who at 17 years old is much older than her. Estela, despite Beto's enthusiasm for engaging in sexual relations, is firm in her refusal of him, out of fear of becoming pregnant. Beto proposes they marry and run away together. To do so, he plans to sell some stolen cocaine packages that a corrupt general secretly drew from a cache the army confiscated and burned in an official event. Beto hides the drugs in Heli's house with Estela's consent until the sale. However, Heli discovers the affair and reprimands his sister, locking her in her room, after secretly disposing of the drugs in an isolated water pit for cattle.

Later that night, some federal policemen storm Heli's house, killing Heli's father when he tries to defend himself thinking they were being assaulted. The officers take Heli and Estela by force (Sabrina and their son not being present at the time) and with a badly beaten Beto they try to find the stolen cocaine. When they find out Heli destroyed the package, the policemen abandon Heli's father's body on the road, and drive to a secure house where drug dealers harshly torture Beto by beating him with wooden sticks and lighting on fire his testicles. Heli's life is spared, but Estela is taken elsewhere. The dealers hang Beto's body from a pedestrian bridge, which kills him, leaving a badly hurt Heli at the scene.

Heli manages to walk back home and the local police, learning of the incident, help Heli to heal and find the body of his father. Later they take Heli's testimony; however, the police assumes Heli and his father are involved with drug dealing and decide not to help them because Heli, shaken and scared of the situation, is not willing to tell what happened nor to sign any written testimony in fear of having himself or his father framed as criminals.

Heli has to deal with the traumas inflicted by these experiences and with the corruption of the police, while his wife begins to distance herself from him due to the erratic and even violent behaviour he begins to display. After going back to work at the car assembly plant, Heli gets distracted on the job and is eventually fired. Heli also sees a News Report in which the Federal Policemen who kidnapped them have been found decapitated. The female detective assigned to his case, after learning that Estela was Beto's girlfriend, asserts that the file of the case is closed, and makes sexual advances on Heli, which are initially reciprocated but eventually rejected.

Estela returns home, traumatised to the point of losing the speech and pregnant beyond the stage she can legally have an abortion. Heli and Sabrina comfort her, and Estela draws a map to the location she was held and raped. Heli goes there and kills the man living there. Seemingly relieved from some of the trauma, he returns home and successfully has sex with his wife, while Estela sleeps peacefully with her nephew.

== Cast ==
- Armando Espitia as Heli, the titular character
- Andrea Vergara as Estela, Heli's sister
- Linda González as Sabrina, Heli's wife
- Juan Eduardo Palacios as Alberto, Estela's boyfriend
- Kenny Johnston as the American Commander and military training counselor

== Reception ==
=== Critical response ===
Heli has an approval rating of 58% on review aggregator website Rotten Tomatoes, based on 45 reviews, and an average rating of 6.1/10. The website's critical consensus states: "There's no denying the seriousness of Heli's story or the raw power of its more uncomfortable moments, but they're used in service of a grimly alienating film that many viewers may ultimately find unrewarding". Metacritic assigned the film a weighted average score of 59 out of 100, based on 20 critics, indicating "mixed or average reviews". Following its première at the Cannes Film Festival, The Hollywood Reporter reviewed, "Heli is undoubtedly made with serious intent, but it is also relentlessly depressing and curiously uninvolving, with limited audience appeal beyond the film-festival bubble." Scott Foundas of Variety predicted that the film was "destined to traumatise buyers and audiences in equal measure" and concluded that the film was "an accomplished but singularly unpleasant immersion in Mexico's vicious cycle of drug-fuelled violence". Brad Brevet of the website Rope of Silicon praised the film's cinematography and wrote, "Heli sends a message commenting on the fear and degradation of future generations in Mexico specifically as a result of corruption and drug trafficking in underdeveloped areas. [Escalante] does this quite effectively, which makes for a rather uncomfortable watch, even if what you're watching is competently crafted." Michael Olezczyk, for Roger Ebert.com, gave a lukewarm review: "...Instead of locking the viewer in a torture chamber the way "Saw" franchise does, the film actually explores the psychic cost of violence in detail and gives some hint of a possible rebirth at the end". Olezczyk praised Escalante as a "highly talented film-maker who happens to be drawn toward portraying malice". Writing for The Daily Telegraph, Robbie Collin was more appreciative of the film and noted that the film "shows that even a bleak existence can make an uplifting story". Escalante declared for the Mexican website "Animal Político" (Political animal) that the film itself isn't anti-Mexican. Additionally, Gabriel Reyes, (who helped Escalante on writing the script), declared that, "It would be socially irresponsible not to speak about the bad things that are occurring in our country."

=== Accolades ===
Award	Category	Winner/Nominee	Result
Cannes Film Festival	Best Director	Amat Escalante	Won
Festival du Nouveau Cinema	Louve D'or for Best Feature Film in the International Competition		Won
Film Fest Munich	Arri Award		Won
International Film Festival of the Art of Cinematography Plus Camerimage	Silver Frog for Best Cinematography	Lorenzo Hagerman	Won
Lima Film Festival	Jury Prize for Best Film		Won
Havana Film Festival	Casa de Las Américas Award		Won
Havana Film Festival	Grand Coral - First Prize		Won
Havana Film Festival	Cuban Critics Award		Won
Viña del Mar International Film Festival	Best Picture		Won
Viña del Mar International Film Festival	Best Director		Won
Palm Springs International Film Festival	Cine Latino Award		Won
Stockholm International Film Festival	Best Cinematography		Won
The Platino Awards for Iberoamerican Cinema	Best Director		Won

== See also ==
- List of submissions to the 86th Academy Awards for Best Foreign Language Film
- List of Mexican submissions for the Academy Award for Best Foreign Language Film
