= The Amazing Catfish =

2013 film directed by Claudia Sainte-Luce

- Los insólitos peces gato
- Directed by: Claudia Sainte-Luce
- Written by: Claudia Sainte-Luce
- Produced by: Geminiano Pineda
- Starring: Ximena Ayala; Lisa Owen; Sonia Franco; Wendy Guillén; Andrea Baeza; Alejandro Ramirez-Munoz
- Cinematography: Agnès Godard
- Edited by: Santiago Ricci
- Music by: Madame Recamier
- Production companies: Cine Canibal, Jaqueca Films, Good Lap Production
- Release date: 10 August 2013 (Locarno)
- Running time: 89 minutes
- Country: Mexico
- Language: Spanish
- Budget: $1,300,000

The Amazing Catfish (Spanish: Los insólitos peces gato) is a 2013 Mexican comedy-drama film, written and directed by Claudia Sainte-Luce. It stars Ximena Ayala as Claudia, a young woman who becomes a caretaker for Martha (Lisa Owen), an older matriarch dying of AIDS.

The film premiered on August 10, 2013 at the Locarno International Film Festival, where it won two Junior Jury Awards and was a nominee for the Golden Leopard. It had its North American premiere on September 10, 2013 at the 2013 Toronto International Film Festival, and was named winner of the FIPRESCI Discovery Prize.

== Plot ==
Claudia is a young woman who lives alone and works at a supermarket. One night, she awakens with severe abdominal pain from appendicitis and checks herself into the hospital. In the hospital bed beside hers lies an older woman named Martha, who is being tended to by her children: the eldest, Alejandra "Ale," the second eldest, Wendy, and the school-aged Mariana and Armando. Martha strikes up a conversation with Claudia and the two form a connection.

Martha and Claudia are discharged from the hospital at the same time and Martha insists that they drive Claudia to their home to recover from her appendectomy. Claudia eats dinner with the family, but the meal ends early when Wendy must help Martha to the bathroom where she vomits up her food. Wendy and Ale proceed to take Martha to the hospital. Claudia is forced to spend the night, as Ale has locked the door for fear that Claudia would steal from them.

Claudia takes Mariana and Armando to school since Wendy and Ale are both unable to, and begins to bond with the two. Ale later drives them all to the hospital where Claudia realizes that Martha has AIDS. Claudia agrees to watch Martha that night, as Wendy and Ale both have prior commitments. Martha asks Claudia about her parents; Claudia describes her mother as extremely frugal and her father as aloof.

The next morning Martha reminisces about the fathers of her children; she reveals that a man named Armando, the father of Mariana and Armando, is the one who infected her. While she was initially angry with Armando, she ultimately stayed by his side until he died.

Claudia buys Armando a catfish. Later, Claudia admits to Martha that she does not know her father and her mother died when she was two — she has been alone ever since.

Martha's health continues to worsen. Per Martha's wishes, the family goes on a trip to the beach. During dinner one night, while on vacation, Martha becomes especially ill and the family rushes her to the hospital. While everybody else enters the hospital with Martha, Claudia stands outside, then grabs her backpack, the fish tank, and walks away.

On an unspecified date after Martha's death, Claudia and the family drive through the city and spread Martha's ashes. The film ends with Martha narrating her final words to her children and Claudia.

== Reception ==
Rotten Tomatoes gives the film a rating of 100% based on reviews from 8 critics. Metacritic gives the film a weighted average score of 69 out of 100, based on reviews from 5 critics.

The film won several awards including International Critics Award at the 2013 Toronto International Film Festival.
