= Valeriu Gagiu =

Moldovan filmmaker (1938–2010)

Valeriu Gagiu OR
- Born: 1 May 1938; Chişinău, Romania
- Died: 21 December 2010 (aged 72); Chişinău, Moldova
- Years active: 1967–2010

Valeriu Gagiu (1 May 1938 – 21 December 2010) was a Soviet and Moldovan film director, producer and screenwriter.

== Biography ==
Valeriu Gagiu was born on 1 May 1938 in Chișinău. He started his creative activity as a poet and journalist. In 1958-1963, he attended the Scenarios Faculty at the Gerasimov Institute of Cinematography, a film school in Moscow. Since 1962, he has been a member of the Writers' Union and a member of the Union of Cinematographers.

Since he was a student, he began to collaborate with the film studio "Moldova-film", and in 1961, he wrote the screenplay for the movie "Man goes after the sun". In 1960s his works were focused on poetic film proclamation, he wrote the screenplay for the such a movies like "When the Cocks Go" ("Când se duc cocorii") (1963), "The street is listening" ("Strada ascultă") (1964) and "The Taste of Bread" ("Gustul pâinii") (1966).

In 1966, he debuted as a movie director with the "Taste of Bread" ("Gustul pâinii") where the screenplay was written by him together with Vadim Lisenko. Then, directed the move "Ten winters for one summer" ("Zece ierni pe o vară"). In the 1970s, he directed the movie of historic and revolutionary character: "Delayed Explosion" ("Explozie întârziată") (1970), "The last Outlaw"("Ultimul haiduc") (1972), "After the beast" ("Pe urmele fiarei") (1976) etc. After making the musical - "Where is love" ("Unde ești dragoste") (1981), Valieriu Gagiu screened various works of classical literature: "The history of one golden coin" ("Istoria unui galben") (1983), "The Mysterious Prisoner" ("Deținutul Misterios") (1986), "The kites do not share the prey" ("Corbii prada n-o împart") (1988), "The street of lamps off" ("Strada felinarelor stinse") (1990), "After the footsepts of Miorița" ("Pe urmele Mioriței"), etc.

In the 1990s, Valeriu Gagiu's work focused on the genre of documentary film. During the Romanian Revolution of 1989, Valeriu Gagiu is one of the few Moldovan filmmakers to have captured the dramatic pages of the events of that time, making the documentary feature film "Bloody Christmas" (1989). In 1992, he was next to the first line Moldavian combatants and volunteers during the armed conflict on the Dniester river, and wrote the play "The Duet for two snipers" reflecting some images of this war (a fragment was published in "The Magic Lantern" 2-3 / 1996).

Since 2000, Valeriu Gagiu works as a professor at the Academy of Music, Theater and Fine Arts in Chișinău, teaching film and scripting courses. He was an artistic director of several projects at the Moldova-film studio.

Valeriu Gagiu died on 21 December 2010 in the city of Chișinău at the age of 72.

== Awards ==
Valeriu Gagiu has won different awards at several film festivals, namely:

- The First Prize for the Screenplay "Man follows the sun" at the International Film Festival in Helsinki (1961);
- Laureate of the National Youth Prize "Boris Glavan" (1967);
- The Great Amber Award for the Best Film at the Regional Film Festival in Chișinău (1967);
- Best Screenplay Prize at the Leningrad Film Festival (1968) for the "Taste of Bread" movie;
- An award for the novel "Tulburel " and for the "Ten winters for one summer" at the Edinburgh International Film Festival (1970);
- Best Screenplay award at the Alma-Ata Union Film Festival (1973, 6th edition) and Kazakhstan Special Writers' Union Award (Alma-Ata, 1973) for The Last Outlaw;
- Special diploma at the Unique Film Festival (VIII-th edition, Chișinău, 1975) "For the one day";
- The Jury Diploma at the Vilnius Unique Film Festival (XIV-th, 1981) for the movie "Where is love?";
- As a recognition of his merits, he was awarded the title of Emeritus Master of Art of M.S.S.R. (1984), honorary member of the Nika International Film Academy of Russia;
- The Jury Award for Best Actress at the Tveri Film Festival (1989) for the move "The kites do no share the prey";
- The Jury Award for Best Documentary at the DaKino International Film Festival in Bucharest (1997);
- He was awarded the order "Red Flag of the Labor" and the Order of the Republic (1998);
- Distinguished Artist of Moldova, he was decorated with the Moldova Order of the Republic in 1998.;
- Mention for High Artistic Value and Humanism at the European Film Festival in Kolobjezg-Poland (2003) for the movie "Now he's alone";
- People's Artist of the Republic of Moldova - (2010).

He is best known for directing the Sofia Rotaru musical Where Has Love Gone?.

== Filmography ==
Film director

- Where Has Love Gone? (1981)

Screenwriter

- Man Follows the Sun (co-written with Mikhail Kalik; 1961)
