= Yevgeni Menshov =

Spviet and Russian actor (1947–2015)

- Born: Yevgeni Aleksandrovich Menshov; 19 February 1947; Gorky, USSR
- Died: 19 May 2015 (aged 68); Moscow, Russia
- Years active: 1972–2015
- Spouse: Olga Groznaya
- Awards: Order of Honour; Merited Artist of the Russian Federation

Yevgeni Aleksandrovich Menshov (Russian: Евге́ний Алекса́ндрович Меньшо́в; 19 February 1947 — 19 May 2015) was a Soviet and Russian actor and presenter. An actor of the Moscow Gogol Theatre, he was a Meritorious Artist of Russia (1993). For many years he was the host of the leading TV music festival Pesnya goda. People's Artist of Russia (2005).

Menshov died on 19 May 2015 at the age of 68 after a brief illness.
