= Adi Popovici =

Romanian handball player (born 1969)

Personal information
- Nationality: Romanian
- Born: 1 July 1969 (age 57)

Sport
- Sport: Handball

Adi Popovici (born 1 July 1969) is a Romanian handball player. He competed in the men's tournament at the 1992 Summer Olympics.
