= Carbon (2022 Moldovan film) =

2022 Moldovan film

- Directed by: Ion Borș
- Written by: Mariana Starciuc
- Starring: Dumitru Roman; Ion Vantu; Igor Caras-Romanov
- Cinematography: Ruben Agadjanean
- Music by: Sergei Kharlamov
- Release date: 4 October 2022
- Running time: 103 minutes
- Countries: Moldova, Romania, Spain
- Language: Romanian

Carbon is a 2022 Romanian-language film directed by Ion Borș. It was co-produced by Moldova, Romania, and Spain. It premiered on 4 October 2022. The film was chosen as Moldova's candidate for the Academy Award for Best International Feature Film in the 95th edition of the awards, but it was not ultimately nominated. It has had the most screenings in cinemas across the country—over 1,500—the highest number of viewers since independence—over 150,000—and the longest screening period in cinemas—24 months. Additionally, the film production was screened in the most cities across the Republic of Moldova, totaling 50.

== Synopsis ==
The story is set in Moldova at the beginning of the 1990s. It follows Dima, who wants to enlist in the troops fighting on the front line of Transnistria. Vasea, a veteran of the Soviet–Afghan War, joins him, but on their way to the front, they find a charred corpse.

== Cast ==
- Dumitru Roman as Dima
- Ion Vantu as Vasea
- Igor Caras-Romanov as Primarul
- Adriana Bîtca as Ileana
- Viorel Cornescu as Politistul
- Ion Coseru as Petrică

== Release ==
The film was released on 4 October 2022.

== Online premiere ==
In 2024, it was announced that a highly anticipated movie would premiere online on November 16, 2024. The premiere, scheduled for 21:00 Moldova time, aimed to break three world records. The film's creators intended to gather over 355,000 viewers simultaneously in front of their screens to surpass the record for "The largest online premiere," set by the Indian film Dil Bechara in 2020.

Additionally, the film planned to include the name of every viewer in the end credits, targeting two other records: "The most names in end credits," previously set by the Japanese film Sensou to seishun in 1991, and "The longest end credits," a record held jointly by Once Upon a Time in the West and Superman.

By November 12, over 30,000 tickets had been sold across 82 countries, and the names of ticket purchasers were included in the end credits. The film successfully set two world records:

- The most names in end credits with 21,559 names.
- The longest end credits, lasting 1.5 hours.
