= Moldova-Film =

Moldovan film studio and production company

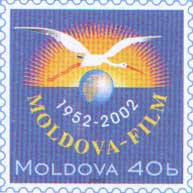
- Company type: Corporation
- Industry: Motion pictures Animated films
- Founded: 1947
- Headquarters: Chișinău, Moldova
- Key people: Alisa Grecu (director)
- Products: Motion pictures Television programs

Moldova-Film (Romanian: Moldova-film, Russian: Молдова-фильм) is a Moldovan film studio and production company founded in 1952 in the Moldavian SSR. It is one of the oldest film studios in Moldova.

== History ==
Moldova-Film was founded in 1947 in Chişinău as a branch of the Central Studio for Documentary Film. In 1949 the branch was taken over by the Odessa Film Studio and in 1952 became an independent film studio as the Moldovan Newsreel Documentary Studio. In 1957 the studio was reorganized and renamed into Moldovan Studio for Feature and Newsreel Documentary Studio, or Moldova-Film.

V. Sevelev became the first director. January 24, 1957 the branch was transformed into a studio of artistic and documentary movies and was called "Moldova-Film". During Soviet times, five artistic units made part of the company: "Arta", "Lumina", "Luceafarul", "Panorama", "Steluta", producing every year up to six long play movies (three of which under order of the Central Television), four cartoons, 25 documentaries and 20 scientific and educational films, as well 12 issues of cinema magazine Soviet Moldavia and six copies of humoristic magazine Usturich.
