= List of Mexican films of 2003 =

== 2003 ==
Title	Director	Cast	Genre	Notes
2003
Asesino en serio	Antonio Urrutia	Jesus Ochoa, Eduardo España		
Corazón de melón	Luis Vélez			
Dame tu cuerpo	Rafael Montero	Luz María Zetina, Rafael Sánchez-Navarro, Amalia Aguilar		
La hija del caníbal	Antonio Serrano			
Mil nubes de paz cercan el cielo, amor, jamás acabarás de ser amor	Julián Hernández			
El misterio del Trinidad	José Luis García Agraz			
Mónica y el profesor	Héctor Bonilla			
Nicotina	Hugo Rodríguez	Diego Luna		
Seis días en la oscuridad	Gabriel Soriano			
Sin destino	Leopoldo Laborde			
Sin ton ni Sonia	Carlos Sama	Juan Manuel Bernal, Cecilia Suárez		
Tiempo real	Fabrizio Prada			
La tregua	Alfonso Rosas Priego			
Vera	Francisco Athié			
Zurdo	Carlos Salces			
Ladies' Night	Gabriela Tagliavini	Ana Claudia Talancón, Luis Roberto Guzmán, Ana de la Reguera		
Ita Yuyu			Short	
Magos y Gigantes		Xóchitl Ugarte, Rossy Aguirre, Trujo	Animation	

== See also ==
- List of 2003 box office number-one films in Mexico
