= 46th Ariel Awards =

2004 Mexican film awards

The XLVI Award of the Premio Ariel (2004) of the Academia Mexicana de Artes y Ciencias Cinematográficas took place on March 30, 2004 at the Palacio de Bellas Artes. The Premio Ariel for the best movie was awarded to El misterio del Trinidad.

== Best film ==
=== Winner ===
El misterio del Trinidad

Producers: García Agraz & Asociados, Instituto Mexicano de Cinematografía (Imcine) - Foprocine, Origen Producciones, Videocine and Resonancia Puerto Rico

=== Nominees ===
- Japón

Producers: Mantarraya Producciones, Nodream Cinema, Carlos Serrano and Imcine - Foprocine

- Mil nubes de paz cercan el cielo, amor, jamás acabarás de ser amor

Producers: Roberto Fiesco Trejo, Julián Hernández, Diego Arizmendi and the Imcine

== Best director ==
=== Winner ===
José Luis García Agraz for El misterio del Trinidad

=== Nominees ===
- Carlos Reygadas for Japón
- Julián Hernández for Mil nubes de paz cercan el cielo, amor, jamás acabarás de ser amor

== Best Iberoamerican film ==
=== Winner ===
Los lunes al sol of Fernando León de Aranoa (Spain)

=== Nominees ===
- Historias mínimas of Carlos Sorín (Argentina)
- El viaje hacia el mar of Guillermo Casanova (Uruguay)

== First Work ==
=== Winner ===
Carlos Reygadas Castillo por Japón

=== Nominees ===
- Everardo González for La canción del pulque
- Julián Hernández for Mil nubes de paz cercan el cielo, amor, jamás acabarás de ser amor

== Best cinematography ==
=== Winner ===
Guillermo Granillo por Volverás

=== Nominees ===
- Diego Martínez Vignatti for Japón
- Marcelo Iaccarino for Nicotina

== Best actress ==
=== Winner ===
Rosa María Bianchi for Nicotina

=== Nominees ===
- Magdalena Flores for Japón
- Carmen Madrid for Nicotina

== Best actor ==
=== Winner ===
Rafael Inclán for Nicotina

=== Nominees ===
- Eduardo Palomo for El misterio del Trinidad
- Alejandro Ferretis for Japón

== Best supporting actress ==
=== Winner ===
Clarisa Rendón for Mil nubes de paz cercan el cielo, amor, jamás acabarás de ser amor

=== Nominees ===
- Regina Blandón for El misterio del Trinidad
- Maite Embil for La tregua

== Best supporting actor ==
=== Winner ===
Daniel Giménez Cacho for Nicotina

=== Nominees ===
- Guillermo Gil for El misterio del Trinidad
- Tristán Ulloa for Volverás

== Best cast actress ==
=== Winner ===
Perla de la Rosa for Mil nubes de paz cercan el cielo, amor, jamás acabarás de ser amor

=== Nominees ===
- Lisa Owen for El misterio del Trinidad
- María de la Luz Cendejas por Seis días en la oscuridad

== Best cast actor ==
=== Winner ===
Alejandro Parodi for El misterio del Trinidad

=== Nominees ===
- Jorge Zárate for Nicotina
- Silverio Palacios for Sin ton ni Sonia

== Best documentary ==
=== Winner ===
La canción del pulque of Everardo González

=== Nominees ===
- La pasión de María Elena of Mercedes Moncada
- Recuerdos of Marcela Arteaga

== Best short documentary ==
=== Winner ===
Lo que quedó de Pancho of Amir Galván Cervera

=== Nominees ===
- Los murmullos of Gabriel Hernández Tinajero
- XV en Zaachila of Rigoberto Pérezcano

== Best short film ==
=== Winner ===
- Los no invitados of Ernesto Contreras, director

=== Nominees ===
- El otro sueño americano of Enrique Arroyo
- La Nao de China of Patricia Arriaga

== Best animation short ==
The category was considered deserted

== Best original script ==
=== Winners (tie) ===
- Carlos Reygadas Castillo for Japón
- Martín Salinas for Nicotina

=== Nominees ===
- José Luis García Agraz and Carlos Cuarón for El misterio del Trinidad
- Julián Hernández for Mil nubes de paz cercan el cielo, amor, jamás acabarás de ser amor

== Best Adaptation ==
=== Winner ===
Antonio Chavarrías for Volverás

=== Nominees ===
- Javier Valdés and Carlos Puig for Asesino en serio
- Antonio Serrano for Lucía, Lucía

== Best Original Score ==
=== Winners ===
- Paul van Dyk for Zurdo

=== Nominees ===
- Mastretta for El misterio del Trinidad

== Best sound ==
=== Winners (tie) ===
- Enrique L. Rendón, Aurora Ojeda, Ernesto Gaytán, Eliseo Fernández and Basilio García Reyes for Mil nubes de paz cercan el cielo, amor, jamás acabarás de ser amor
- Nerio Barberis, Lena Esquenazi and Ernesto Gaytán for Nicotina
- Gabriel Coll, Lena Esquenazi, Carlos Salces, Jaime Baksht and Ernesto Gaytán for Zurdo

=== Nominees ===
Antonio Diego, Samuel Larson y Olivier Dô Huú for Vera

== Best art design ==
Eugenio Caballero, María Salinas, Canek Saemich Zenzes, Bárbara Enríquez and Óscar Hernández for Zurdo

=== Nominees ===
- Sandra Cabriada and Darío Ramos for Nicotina
- Theresa Wachter for Vera

== Best make-up ==
=== Winner ===
Elisa Martínez for Vera

=== Nominees ===
- Mario Zarazúa for Nicotina
- Alfredo Mora and Mario Zarazúa for Zurdo

== Best wardrobe ==
=== Winner ===
Bárbara González for Zurdo

=== Nominees ===
- Malena de la Riva for Asesino en serio
- Alejandra Dorantes for Nicotina
- Bárbara González for Vera

== Best edition ==
=== Winner ===
Alberto de Toro for Nicotina

=== Nominees ===
- Jacobo Hernández and Emiliano Arenales for Mil nubes de paz cercan el cielo, amor, jamás acabarás de ser amor
- Carlos Salces for Zurdo

== Best special effects ==
=== Winner ===
- John Chadwick, Falk Büttner and Pedro González Sánchez for Vera

=== Nominees ===
- Jesús Pascual, Ramón Lorenzo, Manuel Carrión and Alejandro Vázquez for El misterio del Trinidad
- Daniel Cordero and Jaime Ramos por Zurdo

== Awards per movie ==
- Nicotina (4)

Best Actress, Best Actor, Best Supporting Actor, Best Sound

- Mil nubes de paz cercan el cielo, amor, jamás acabarás de ser amor (3)

Best Supporting Actress, Best Cast Actress, Best Sound

- Vera (3)

Best Original Score, Best Make-Up, Best Special Effects

- Zurdo (3)

Best Original Score, Best Sound, Best Art Design

- El misterio de la trinidad (2)

Best Film, Best Cast Actor

- Japón (2)

Best Original Script, Best First Work

- Volverás (2)

Best Adapted Script, Best Cinematography
