= Mexican LGBTQ cinema =

There are many Mexican LGBT+ films, a genre that has developed through the film history of the country since the 1970s.

Gay characters have appeared in Mexican cinema since the 1930s, but were not integrated until the ficheras of the 1970s. After this genre of sexploitation comedy, Mexico produced films as part of the wave of Maricón cinema. In 2001, with the success of Y Tu Mamá También, Mexico propelled Latin America into a period of increased LGBT+ film production unified as New Maricón Cinema.

Within Mexico-specific LGBT+ cinema, a conflict of homosexuality and national identity is common and a frequent topic of analysis.

== History ==
Gay characters in Mexican cinema have been said by Michael K. Schuessler to have started out in films as stereotypes to be ridiculed, but, in line with "the change in conception about homosexuality in Mexican culture", writes that they developed into "complex characters with psychological depth". Schuessler notes the films of Arturo Ripstein and Jaime Humberto Hermosillo, calling them a "transition point" before the works of Julián Hernández that comprise a lot of Mexican gay cinema in the 21st century.

=== Early gay characters: Fichera ===
Fichera is the genre of Mexican film that contained the first gay characters. Dominating production in the country in the 1970s and early 1980s — around a third of Mexican films in 1981 were ficheras.^{:28} They contained characters including transvestites and jotos,^{:29} and were influenced by even earlier Mexican nightclub films that contained queens performing as a common trope; the type of gay characters in the films may fit the "in-between" type of Richard Dyer's categories.^{:75} Though showing such characters may have been considered progressive so early in film history, this is the only realization of LGBT themes and the characters were typically small parts and played for comedy by being based in gender deviance.^{:76} What are now considered among Mexican LGBT+ films in the 1970s and 1980s do not include films in the related but distinct genre of fichera.

=== Maricón cinema ===
Maricón cinema is similar to the fichera but has a structured narrative and less comedy. Films of this era in Mexico include those of Ripstein and Hermosillo, particularly Doña Herlinda y su hijo.^{:175-176} Fresa y chocolate is said to be a "classic" of the genre, which lasted primarily up to, though with some films produced after, 2001.^{:178-179}

=== Post-2001: Y Tu Mamá También and New Maricón Cinema ===
Several of the notable works of Ximena Cuevas, a Mexican performance artiste who incorporates themes of lesbianism into her works and who has been called "a perfect prototype for an emergent Queer New Latin American Cinema", were performed in 2001.^{:172} In this year, Y tu mamá también was also released. The popularity and success across the Spanish and English speaking worlds became a trigger moment in Latin American LGBT+ cinema, with more LGBT+ themes appearing in the mainstream.^{:176-177}

== In society ==
The 18+ rating given to Y Tu Mamá También in its native Mexico caused outrage, in part because of its reasoning seen as insufficient to warrant the rating but further because this rating completely bans anyone under 18 from seeing the film, which people believed was censorship as parents could not choose to allow their children to see it, if only as a form of education. This prompted its producers the Cuarón brothers to expose the RTC ratings board, which led to the system being separated from government control. The film was released unrated in the United States, as it was feared it would receive the NC-17 rating, with the high rating also a point of condemnation against the US ratings board in Roger Ebert's review.

== Analysis ==
=== Homosexuality and national identity ===
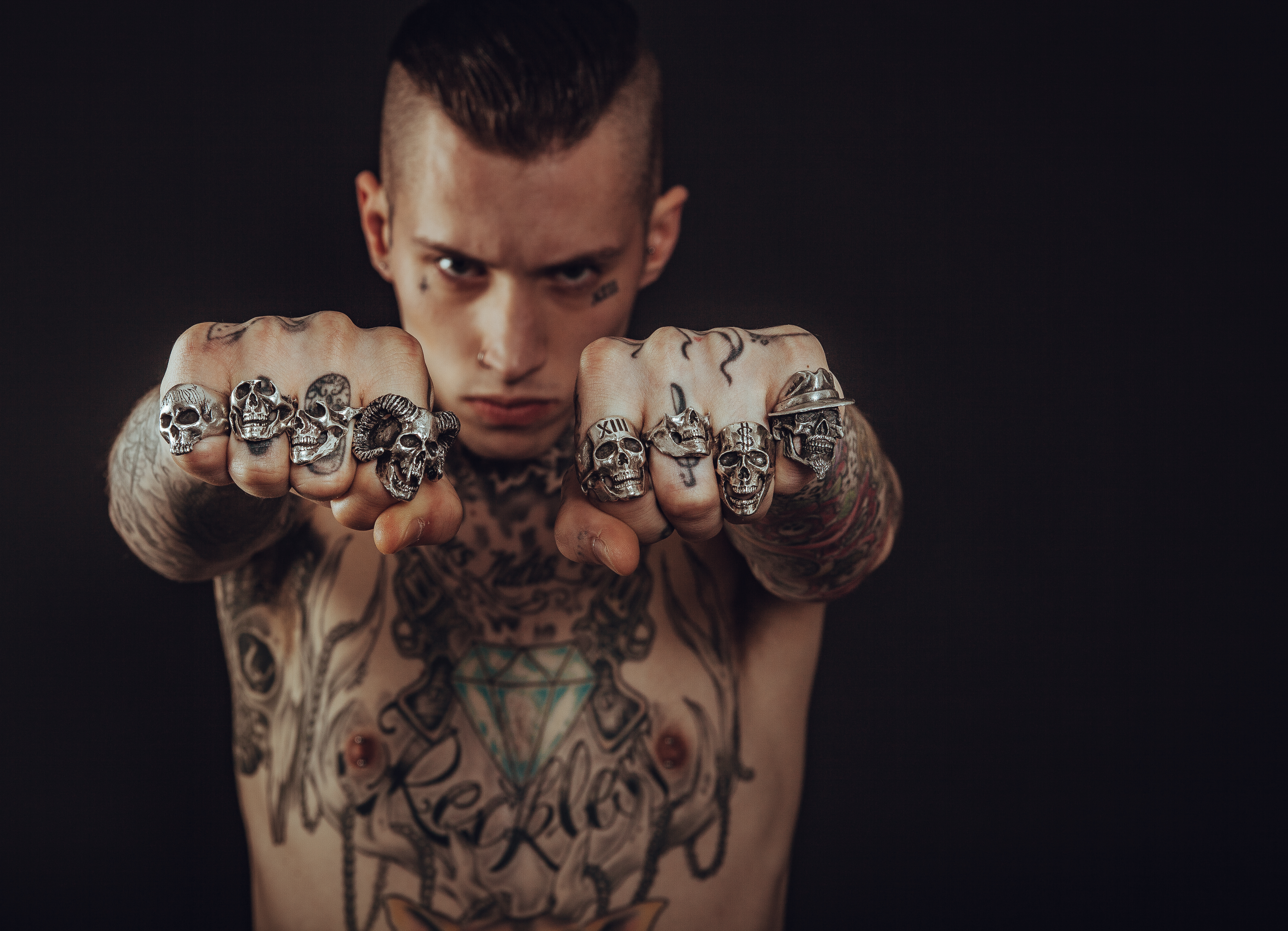
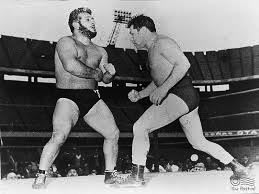
Machismo and no-rules wrestling are predominant features of Mexican culture

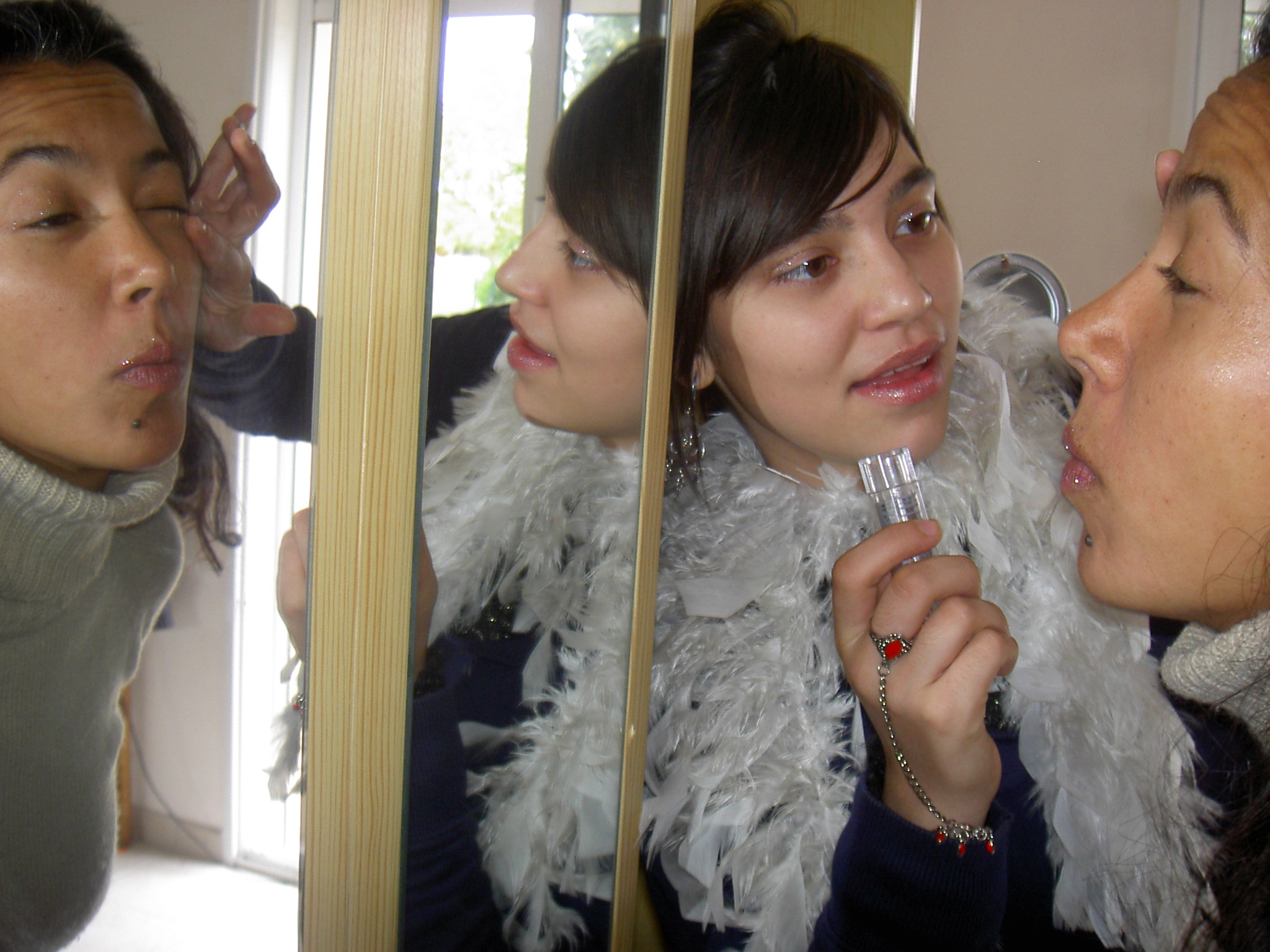
Mexican women dressing for cabaret. The sparkling make-up and feathers used in shows are elaborate and performative exaggerations of feminine gender that can be used to "queer" a heteronormative space.

Several writers analyze representations of gay characters in Mexican cinema, or lack thereof, in relation to fitting into a national identity. In such writings, this identity goes beyond a formulation of machismo and Lucha libre to something more inherently potentially homophobic, where homosexuality is or was traditionally conceived of as not-Mexican.

Alfredo Martínez Expósito writes that though a "conspicuous scarcity of gay characters and themes in Mexican cinema" may be blamed on "a machismo-inflected patriarchy", the image of the homosexual is more likely controlled by "both the image that Mexicans have formed of his own country and the image that Mexico has exported to other countries". Martínez Expósito suggests that "cinematic attempts to introduce gay characters and themes in national cinema should necessarily be doomed" because "Mexicanness" as a concept and identity contains a lot of features associated with patriarchy, which he says explains why Mexican LGBT+ cinema (pre-2001) used various strategies in order to acceptably introduce their themes; characters who are camp but not gay, characters who are closeted, for example, up until "the latent homosexual in Y tu mamá también", which he suggests "tested the limits of national tolerance".

Vinodh Venkatesh, in his writing on the role of children in Latin American LGBT+ films, also notes this theme more recently. Hendrix in 2011's La otra familia is educated on LGBT+ matters and has a representative choice to accept a foreign gay couple as his adoptive parents, implicitly a choice allowing queerness to be introduced into national identity. This film is also noted for instructionally introducing the English term "gay" as a modern and politically correct term to replace the extensive lexicon of gay slurs pertaining only to Mexico, and featuring exaggerated stereotypes of typical Mexican characters in Gabino and Doña Chuy trying to reinforce ideals of machismo, homophobia, and national identity all mixed together to Hendrix.^{:188-190}

Christina Elaine Baker's doctoral thesis looks at Mexican cabaret and different forms of drag as being expressions of queerness outside of the mainstream represented by film. Baker extends her scope to view the queering properties of these performances to be "questioning not just identity constructions, but also the way the body exists in relation to the space and time within which the performances occur", suggesting that "the artists [...] queer, subvert and re-configure expectations of heteronormativity, the whitened mestizo physique and male/female gender binaries associated with mexicanidad," and that by using queer bodies in this way "they propose alternative definitions of what it means to be Mexican." Baker notes that there is no similar representation or challenge to what constitutes national identity in Mexican film of the Golden Age, which she places as the mainstream, but that the performance appears in the LGBT+ cinema movements that succeed it, including fichera and Maricón cinema.

== Films ==
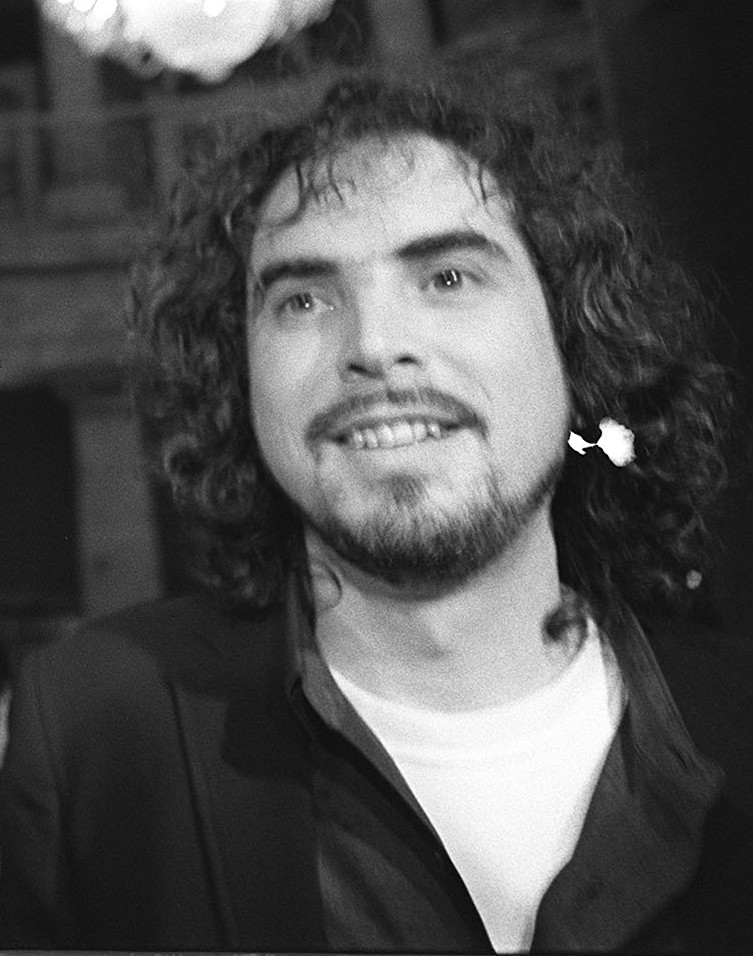
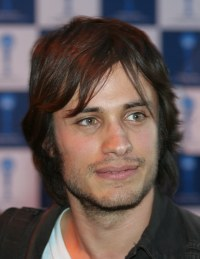
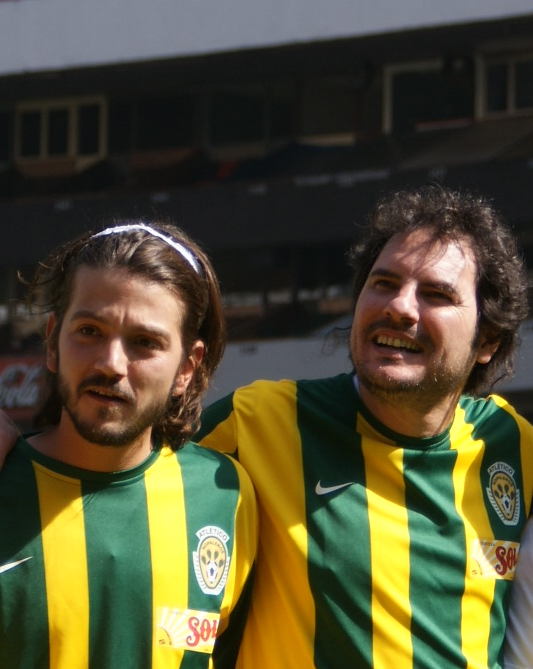
Mexican writers Alfonso (top left) and Carlos Cuarón (bottom right) were nominated for the Academy Award for Best Original Screenplay for their 2001 film Y Tu Mamá También, which Alfonso also directed and which starred Gael García Bernal (top right) and Diego Luna (bottom left).

The bisexual-themed 2001 Y Tu Mamá También was nominated for an Oscar.

Year	Film title	Director	Notes
1938	La casa del ogro	Fernando de Fuentes	
1951	Muchachas de Uniforme	Alfredo B. Crevenna	remake of the German Mädchen in Uniform
1969	Modisto de señoras	René Cardona Jr.	
1972	Fin de la fiesta		
1973	Peluquero de señoras	René Cardona Jr.	
1973	The Holy Mountain	Alejandro Jodorowsky	
1975	Satánico pandemonium	Gilberto Martínez Solares	
1976	Tres mujeres en la hoguera	Abel Salazar	
1977	Alucarda	Juan López Moctezuma	
1978	The Place Without Limits	Arturo Ripstein	
1983	Appearances Are Deceptive	Jaime Humberto Hermosillo	
1984	El Otro	Arturo Ripstein	
1985	¿Como vés?	Paul Leduc	
1985	Dona Herlinda and Her Son	Jaime Humberto Hermosillo	features first same-sex couple in Mexican cinema
1986	Casos de alarma 1/SIDA	Benjamín Escamilla Espinosa	
1987	Clandestino destino	Jaime Humberto Hermosillo	
1987	Mentiras piadosas	Arturo Ripstein	
1988	El verano de la señora Forbes	Jaime Humberto Hermosillo	
1989	El chico temido de la vecindad	Enrique Gómez Vadillo	
1989	Santa Sangre	Alejandro Jodorowsky	
1990	El día de las locas	Eduardo Martínez	
1990	Machos	Enrique Gómez Vadillo	
1990	Muerte en la playa	Enrique Gómez Vadillo	
1991	Amsterdam boulevard	Enrique Gómez Vadillo	
1991	Danzón	María Novaro	
1992	Imperio de los malditos	Christian González	
1993	Actos impuros	Roberto Fiesco	written by Fiesco and Julián Hernández
1993	Bienvenido-Welcome	Gabriel Retes	
1993	En el paraíso no existe el dolor	Víctor Saca	
1993	Miroslava	Alejandro Pelayo	
1994	Dulces compañías	Oscar Blancarte	
1994	Strawberry and Chocolate	Tomás Gutiérrez Alea and Juan Carlos Tabío	
1995	Cilantro y perejil	Rafael Montero	
1995	Midaq Alley	Jorge Fons	
1997	De noche vienes, Esmeralda	Jaime Humberto Hermosillo	
1997	En las manos de Dios	Zalman King	
1997	El evangelio de las maravillas	Arturo Ripstein	
1999	Crónica de un desayuno	Benjamín Cann	
1999	Sin destino	Leopoldo Laborde	
2001	Y Tu Mamá También	Alfonso Cuarón	
2001	De la calle	Gerardo Tort	
2001	Demasiado amor	Ernesto Rimoch	
2002	Exxxorcismos	Jaime Humberto Hermosillo	
2003	A Thousand Clouds of Peace	Julián Hernández	
2003	Lucía, Lucía	Antonio Serrano	
2003	Vivir	Julián Hernández	short film
2004	7 mujeres, 1 homosexual y Carlos	René Bueno	
2004	Puñas rosas	Beto Gómez	
2004	Temporada de patos	Fernando Eimbcke	
2005	David	Roberto Fiesco	short film
2005	Identidad	Julián Hernández	short film; also known as Fragmento de identidad and I Will Sleep When I'm Dead; basis for Broken Sky
2005	Yo estaba ocupada encontrando respuestas, mientras tú simplemente seguías con la vida real	Raúl Fuentes	short film
2006	Broken Sky	Julián Hernández	
2007	Bramadero	Julián Hernández	short film
2007	Quemar las Naves	Francisco Franco Alba	
2009	Raging Sun, Raging Sky	Julián Hernández	
2011	Jet Lag	Sergio Tovar Velarde	
2011	La otra familia	Gustavo Loza	
2012	A World for Raúl	Mauro Mueller	
2013	Instructions Not Included	Eugenio Derbez	
2013	No sé si cortarme las venas o dejármelas largas	Manolo Caro	^{:177}
2013	Peyote	Omar Flores Sarabia	
2014	Four Moons	Sergio Tovar Velarde	
2014	Perfect Obedience	Luis Urquiza	
2014	Velociraptor	Chucho E. Quintero	
2014	Wandering Clouds	Julián Hernández	short film
2014	Yo soy felicidad de este mundo	Julián Hernández	
2015	Eisenstein in Guanajuato	Peter Greenaway	
2015	I Promise You Anarchy	Julio Hernández Cordón	
2015	Muchacho en la barra se masturba con rabia y osadía	Julián Hernández	short film
2015	Trémulo	Roberto Fiesco	short film
2016	Boys on the Rooftop	Julián Hernández	short film
2016	Macho	Antonio Serrano	
2016	The Untamed	Amat Escalante	
2017	A Place to Be	Tadeo Garcia	
2017	Chavela	Catherine Gund and Daresha Kyi	
2017	Cuernavaca	Alejandro Andrade Pease	
2017	Hazlo como hombre	Nicolás López	
2017	I Dream in Another Language	Ernesto Contreras	
2017	The Other Side	Rodrigo Alvarez Flores	
2018	Esto no es Berlín	Hari Sama	
2020	Dance of the 41	David Pablos	

== See also ==
- LGBT culture in Mexico: Cinema
- Nuevo Cine Mexicano
