= Raging Sun, Raging Sky =

- Rabioso sol, rabioso cielo
- Directed by: Julián Hernández
- Written by: Julián Hernández
- Release date: 2009
- Country: Mexico
- Language: Spanish

Raging Sun, Raging Sky (Spanish: Rabioso sol, rabioso cielo) is a 2009 Mexican film, made in 2008, written and directed by Julián Hernández. It is the last film in a trilogy by Hernández that includes A Thousand Clouds of Peace (2003) and Broken Sky (2006). The film usually is over 3 hours long. It won the Teddy Award at the Berlin International Film Festival.

== Plot ==
Two men, Kieri and Ryo, have an unquestioning love for each other. But their mutual devotion is not allowed to last. Ryo is abducted, and Kieri embarks upon a long and difficult journey to find him. Unbeknownst to Kieri, it is "heaven's heart" herself that leads and protects him on his quest. Before Kieri finds his companion, Ryo loses his life. And Kieri, desperate to find his beloved, agrees to sacrifice his body to bring about Ryo's resurrection. When they both die, "heaven's heart" reunites them in death and the two men return to life through myth.

== Cast ==
- Jorge Becerra as Kieri
- Javier Oliván as Tari
- Guillermo Villegas as Ryo
- Giovanna Zacarías as Tatei - (Heart of Sky or corazón del cielo)
- Joaquín Rodríguez as Andrésky
- Juan Carlos Torres as Umberto
- Fabian Storniolo as Sergio
- Harold Torres as Bruno
- Clarissa Rendón as Meche
- Baltimore Beltran as Boxer (or 'Boxeador')
- Rubén Santiago as Jonás
- Rubén Ángel as Boy of the Market (or 'Muchacho del mercado')

== Reception ==
Jay Weissberg from Variety states in 2009, "The power of desire has rarely been so ravishingly lensed" but "without dialogue and awash in naked male-on-male couplings", it would be difficult to sell the film to audiences. Armond White from New York Press on 10 June 2009 noted "[Director] Hernández further develops his ideas on form, romanticism and spirituality. His images are beautiful and intriguing enough to win the popular audience he deserves".

== See also ==
- List of lesbian, gay, bisexual or transgender-related films
