= You'll Be Back (film) =

- Theatrical release poster
- Spanish: Volverás
- Directed by: Antonio Chavarrías
- Screenplay by: Antonio Chavarrías
- Based on: Un enano español se suicida en Las Vegas by Francisco Casavella
- Produced by: Antonio Chavarrías
- Starring: Tristán Ulloa; Unax Ugalde; Elizabeth Cervantes; Joana Rañé
- Cinematography: Guillermo Granillo
- Edited by: Ernest Blasi
- Music by: Javier Navarrete
- Production companies: Oberon Cinematográfica; Altavista Films; Moro Films
- Distributed by: Lauren Film (es)
- Release dates: 4 October 2002 (Spain); 20 June 2003 (Mexico)
- Countries: Spain; Mexico
- Language: Spanish

You'll Be Back (Spanish: Volverás) is a 2002 Spanish-Mexican film written and directed by Antonio Chavarrías based on the novel Un enano español se suicida en Las Vegas by Francisco Casavella. It stars Tristán Ulloa and Unax Ugalde alongside Elizabeth Cervantes and Joana Rañé.

== Plot ==
Architecture student Ignacio puts aside his studies and his plans to move to Los Angeles upon meeting again with his elder brother Carlos, grappling with ludomania. He also develops a mutual attraction with Carlos' Mexican girlfriend Marta.

== Cast ==
- Unax Ugalde as Ignacio
- Tristán Ulloa as Carlos
- Elizabeth Cervantes as Marta
- Joana Rañé as Claudia
- Hermann Bonnín as Padre

== Production ==
An adaptation of Francisco Casavella's novel Un español se suicida en Las Vegas, the screenplay was written by Antonio Chavarrías. The film is a Spanish-Mexican coproduction by Oberon Cinematográfica, Altavista Films, Moro Films, with the participation of TVE, Canal+, and TVC. Shooting locations included Barcelona.

== Release ==
Distributed by Lauren Film, the film was theatrically released in Spain on 4 October 2002. The release in Mexico was set for 20 June 2003.

== Reception ==
Jonathan Holland of Variety deemed the film to be "too low-key for its own good", an "engaging slice-of-life fable which simmers nicely but never boils".

Esteve Riambau of Fotogramas rated You'll Be Back 3 out of 5 stars, deeming it to be "a film as thoughtful as it is dramatically effective", highlighting Ugalde's performance as the best thing about the film.

== Accolades ==
Year	Award	Category	Nominee(s)	Result	Ref.
2003	17th Goya Awards	Best Adapted Screenplay	Antonio Chavarrías	Nominated	
2004	46th Ariel Awards	Best Supporting Actor	Tristán Ulloa	Nominated	
2004	46th Ariel Awards	Best Adapted Screenplay	Antonio Chavarrías	Won	
2004	46th Ariel Awards	Best Cinematography	Guillermo Granillo	Won	

== See also ==
- List of Spanish films of 2002
- List of Mexican films of 2003
