= Elizabeth Cervantes =

Mexican actress of films and soap operas

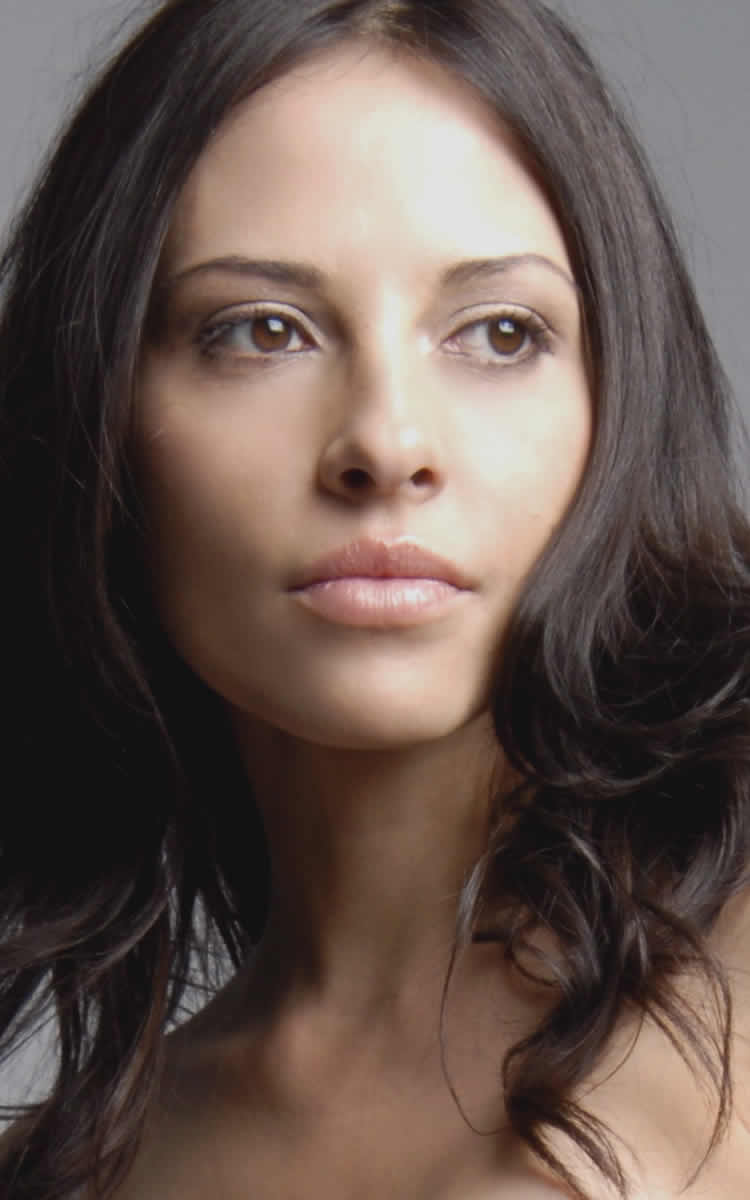
- Born: August 1, 1973 (age 52); Mexico City, Mexico
- Years active: 2000–present

Elizabeth Cervantes (Spanish pronunciation: [elisaˈβet seɾˈβantes]; born August 1, 1973) is a Mexican actress of films and soap operas. She studied acting in Casa del Teatro and Centro de Formacion Actoral of TV Azteca.

== Filmography ==
=== Cine ===
- El Infierno - La Lupe (2010)
- Oscura Seduccion (2010) -as Dr.Laura
- De la infancia - Xaviera (2009)
- Borderland - Anna (2007)
- Mas que a nada en el mundo - Emilia (2006)
- Fuera del cielo - Rebeca (2006)
- Febrer - Cristina (2004)
- Volverás - Marta (2002)

=== Television ===
- Los Rey - Paola Garces Garza de Rey(2012)
- Drenaje Profundo - Rita (2010)
- Vivir por ti - Natalia (2008)
- Decisiones (2007)
- Marina - Sara (2006)
- Gitanas - Érendira (2004)
- El alma herida - Bertha (2003)
- La duda - Valentina (2002)
- Amores... Querer con Alevosía - Matilde Morales (2001)
- Asi en el barrio como en el cielo - estrella lopez de lopez (2015)
