= Demons at Dawn =

2024 Mexican drama film

- Theatrical film poster
- Spanish: Los demonios del amanecer
- Directed by: Julián Hernández
- Written by: Julián Hernández; Gustavo Hernández De Anda
- Produced by: Roberto Fiesco; Iliana Reyes
- Starring: Luis Vegas; Axel Shuarma
- Cinematography: Alejandro Cantú
- Edited by: Emiliano Arenales Osorio; Sebastián Del Valle Leguízamo
- Music by: Arturo Villela
- Release dates: June 13, 2024 (Guadalajara); July 23, 2026 (Mexico)
- Running time: 136 mins.
- Country: Mexico
- Languages: French; Spanish

Demons at Dawn (Spanish: Los demonios del amanecer) is a 2024 Mexican LGBTQ+ independent drama film directed by Julián Hernández, who co-wrote with Gustavo Hernández De Anda. The film stars Luis Vegas and Axel Shuarma. It premiered at the Guadalajara International Film Festival in 2024, before a limited theatrical release throughout Mexico in 2026.

== Synopsis ==
As the boys go against a diverse, ever-changing, hostile world, they'll learn that once the darkness of night is gone and through their intertwined bodies and their synchronized souls, they will have seen all those demons of dawn go by.

== Cast ==
- Luis Vegas as Orlando
- Axel Shuarma as Marco
- Mauricio Rico as Andrés
- Luis Miguel Mata as Elis
- Alejandra Campos as Casera
- Tony Corrales as Sergio
- Mauro González as Bruno
- Angélica Baños Hernández as Cecilia

== Reception ==
Dustin Nelson of Video Librarian lauded the actors and cinematographer: "Luis Vegas as Orlando has charisma and an excellent dancer's body and he tends to dominate the screen in his scenes. Axel Shuarma is more submissive and conciliatory and plays his part well as the less dramatic partner. Alejandro Cantú does good work behind the camera with interesting angles, panoramas and use of colour. Luckily, his frenetic pace there is countered by the often languid pacing of the film." Mike Kennedy of Letterboxd praised the filmmakers: "One of the things that stands out about Hernández's films is the way in which he turns working class Mexico City into a character in his films and this one, co-written with Gustavo Hernández-Anda, is no different."

Armond White of National Review compared it favorably to works by playwrights: "Hernández's cinema equals the verbal poetry of Tennessee Williams and William Inge, depicting spaces filled with longing in a world of chance encounters. That opening disco scene is about movement in life, introducing characters reaching for each other." However, Rubén Rosario of Miami ArtZine derided the film's pacing and structure: "It becomes more and more difficult to tell whether something being depicted is happening in the characters' heads or whether it's happening for real, and as a result, the film's resolution feels so abstract that it fails to resonate."
