= Gus Reyes =

Mexican composer (born 1977)

- Born: Gustavo Alberto Ramírez Reyes; June 27, 1977 (age 49); Mexico City
- Occupation: Composer
- Years active: 1993–present
- Website: https://play.reelcrafter.com/GusReyes_AndresSanchez/Highlights_Reel

Gus Reyes (born June 27, 1977) is a Mexican musician and composer focused on film scoring.

Reyes began his studies in music at the age of 8. His father, Jesus Gustavo Ramírez Avila (Student of Andrés Segovia 1893–1987) was his first teacher in music.

During his early years Reyes was part of several Sacred Music Choirs, all directed by Phillipe H. Tolón, who was Lead Violín at the Opera Orchestra of Bellas Artes (Mexico) at that time. He became soloist fast, and gave tours for many years. Later, Reyes began his studies in many important music institutions ending with his application to the "Cardenal Miranda Institute" in 1995, where he made a triple major in composition, orchestral and choral conducting and musicology.

Renowned Mexican teachers like Xavier Gonzalez Tezcucano, Luis Armando Elias Chain, Philippe H. Tolon, Juan Trigos, Jorge Torres Sáenz, Jaime Uribe, Eduardo Gamboa had been part of his education.

Reyes has collaborated with Andres Sanchez-Maher co-writing music in countless films and TV Series like "Mexican Gangster" (2014), “El Charro de Toluquilla” (Tribeca 2016), "I Dream in Another Language" (Audience Award Winner at the Sundance Film Festival 2017), the documentary film "Ayotzinapa, El Paso de la Tortuga" (Winner of the Audience and the Press Award at Guadalajara International Film Festival 2018), the Netflix - Univision TV Series "El Chapo", "El Complot Mongol", Amazon Prime Video Series "Falco", Netflix Original Series "Control Z", HBO Original Series "Los Espookys", Comedy Central Original Series "Harina" to name a few.

Reyes is known for his orchestral arrangements for bands like "Zoé" in their Latin Grammy award-winning MTV unplugged "Música de Fondo" (2011) and "Dorian" in their album "Diez Años y un Día" (2015).

He was nominated for the IX Jerry Goldsmith Awards for his work on the film "The Dark Side of Light" at the International Film Music Festival, that took place in Cordoba, Spain 2014, and later for the Silver Goddess Manuel Esperón Award for best music for a film at the Pecime Press Awards 2015, 2024 and 2025.

Reyes was selected for the Sundance Institute Film Music Program 2016 that took place at the Skywalker Ranch, Nicasio, California.

Reyes and Sánchez-Maher won the Ariel Award in 2022 for their music of the film "Cosas Imposibles" (Impossible Things), directed by Ernesto Contreras and more recently winners also of the Silver Goddess Manuel Esperon Award in 2025 for their music of the film "Corina", directed by Urzula Barba Hopfner. As of 2025, they are still collaborating.

== Nominations and awards ==
- Winner of the "Best Ibero-american Documentary Film Award" and the "Infinitum Audience Award" at the Guadalajara International Film Festival 2016.
- Winner of the Special Jury Award at the Dock of the Bay Festival of Musical Documentary Films, San Sebastián, Spain
- Winner of "Best Documentary" at the International Film Festival of Mérida, Yucatán 2016
- Best of Fest Selection at Sheffield Doc Fest 2016
- Official Selection at Tribeca Film Festival 2016
- Official Selection at Morelia's International Film Festival 2016
- Official Selection at the Zurich Film Festival 2016
- Honorary Mention at the "Jose Rubirosa Award" by UNAM's Film Archive
- Best Director Honorary Mention at Gasparilla International Film Festival, Tampa Bay, Florida
- Winner of the "Audience Award" in the category of World Drama Cinema at the Sundance Film Festival 2017
- Winner of the "Audience Choice Award" at the St. Paul International Film Festival 2017
- Winner of the "Best Feature Film Award" at the Oslo / Fusion International Film Festival 2017
- Winner of the "Best Screenplay and Best Film Award" at the Huelva Latin American Film Festival 2017
- Winner of the "Audience Award" at the Florida Film Festival 2017
- Winner of the "Best Actor, Best Mexican Feature Fiction and Best Mexican Feature Film Award" at the Guadalajara International Film Festival 2017
- Winner of the "Best Feature Film, Best Screenplay, Best Cinematography, Best Sound, Best Original Score and Best Actor Award" at the Ariel Awards, Mexico 2018
- Winner of the Press Award and the Audience Award at Guadalajara's International Film Festival (FICG) 2018.
- Winner of the 2019 Emmy International Award for Best Non-English Language US Primetime Show.
- Winner of the 2022 Ariel Award for Best Original Score for the Film "Cosas Imposibles".
- Winner of the 2025 Silver Goddess Manuel Esperón Award for Best Original Score for the Film "Corina".

== Filmography ==
He has composed scores for:

- El Guero Estrada (1997) Directed by Gilberto De Anda
- El Manco (1997) Directed by Gilberto Trujillo
- El Gallo Galindo (1997) Directed by Gilberto De Anda
- El Policia Increible (1996) Directed by Eduardo Martínez
- El Encuentro (2003) Directed by Christian Rivera
- Magnicidio, Complot en Lomas Taurinas (2005) Directed by Miguel Marte
- El Ultimo País Mágico (2005) Directed by Demetrio Bilbatúa
- Halcones, Terrorismo de Estado (2006) Directed by Carlos Mendoza
- Los Dueños de la Democracia (2006) Directed by Carlos Mendoza
- Mas que mascotas (TV) (2006) Directed by Fabricio Feduchy
- Bichos en el Corazon de la Tierra (TV) (2007) Directed by Fabricio Feduchy
- El Ultimo Evangelio (2008) Directed by Juan Carlos Valdivia
- Bichos, Atrapados en la Ciudad (TV) (2008) Directed by Fabricio Feduchy
- 1968, La Conexion Americana (2008) Directed by Carlos Mendoza
- El Poder de la Imagen (2008) Directed by Patricia Urias
- Entre Siglos, La Fortaleza de Perote (2008) Directed by Coizta Grecko
- La Independencia de México (2009) Directed by Patricia Urias
- Footprints over Footprints UNESCO presentation Paris, France (2009) Directed by Coizta Grecko
- Tepetongo, its voice and people (2009) Directed by Oscar Hernandez
- La Vida Sobre Rieles (2009) Directed by Felipe Vázquez Maqueda
- 1910, De la Estación al Tren (2009) Directed by Felipe Vázquez Maqueda
- Ciudadanos o Criminales? (2009) Directed by Mario Viveros
- Kebira, El Impacto del Gilf Kebir (Work in progress) (2009) Directed by Felipe Vázquez Maqueda
- Naturaleza Espectacular (TV) (2009) Directed by Fabricio Feduchy
- Blatt Angelus (2009) Directed by Aracely Santana
- Una Guerra Secreta (2009) Directed by Patricia Urias
- El Productor (TV) (2010) Collaboration with composer Andres Sanchez-Maher
- El Secreto (Formerly called "La Casa de las Sanaciones") (2010) Directed by Gilberto De Anda
- Heroes Verdaderos (Additional composer) (2010) Directed by Carlos Kuri
- La Soledad y el Olvido (2010) Directed by Coizta Grecko
- El Libro Rojo: Especies Amenazadas (TV) (2011) Directed by Fabricio Feduchy
- El Ring de la Vida (TV) (2011) Directed by Hugo Carrillo
- El Libro Rojo: Especies Amenazadas 2nd Season (TV) (2012) Directed by Fabricio Feduchy
- El Lado Oscuro de la Luz (2013) Directed by Hugo Carrillo
- Entrenando a mi Papá (2014) Directed by Walter Doehner
- Gangster Mexicano (Mexican Gangster) (2014) (Composer of additional music) Directed by J.M. Cravioto
- Memoria y Verdad (Remembrance and Truth) (2015) Directed by Carlos Mendoza
- Pink (2015) Directed by Francisco del Toro
- El Charro de Toluquilla (2016) Directed by José Villalobos
- Sueño en otro Idioma'(2016) Directed by Ernesto Contreras
- La Ira o el Seól' (2017) Directed by Juan Mora
- Ayotzinapa, El Paso de la Tortuga' (2017) Directed by Enrique García Meza, Produced by Bertha Navarro & Guillermo del Toro
- Ponzoña' (2018) Documentary film Produced and Directed by Rodolfo Juárez & Alejandro Alonso
- El Chapo' TV Series Produced by Story House & Netflix. (2017)
- Complot Mongol' (2018) Directed by Sebastian Del Amo
- Falco' TV Series Produced by Dynamo & Red Arrow’s Spiral International & Amazon Prime & Telemundo. (2018)
- Torre X Torre' Documentary film produced by Roberto Garza, Marco A. Alvarez, Vlad Ketkovich & Luis Eduardo Sáenz (2018)
- Tijuana' TV Series Produced by Story House & Netflix. (2018)
- Chivas, La Película' Produced by Undergoat Films, CobraFilms, Origen Studio, Semillero Studio & Amaury Vergara. (2018)
- Los Espookys' TV Series Produced by HBO, (2019)
- Guadalupe Reyes' (2019) Directed by Salvador Espinosa
- Me case con un Idiota' (2019) Directed by Batan Silva
- Control Z' (2019) Netflix Original Series Directed by Alejandro Lozano
- Cosas Imposibles' (2020) Directed by Ernesto Contreras
- Control Z Season 2' (2021) Netflix Original Series Directed by Alejandro Lozano
- Harina' (2022) Amazon & Comedy Central Original Series Directed by Salvador Espinosa
- Control Z Season 3' (2022) Netflix Original Series Directed by Alejandro Lozano
- Los Espookys Season 2' (2022) TV Series Produced by HBO
- Adolfo' (2022) Directed by Sofía Auza
- El Ultimo Vagon' (2023) Netflix Original film, Directed by Ernesto Contreras
- Harina Season 2' (2023) Amazon & Comedy Central Original Series Directed by Salvador Espinosa
- Ella Camina Sola' (She Walks Alone) (2023) Vix + Original Series Directed by Inés María Barrionuevo, Analeine Cal y Mayor & Cris Gris
- The Chosen One" (2023) Netflix Original Series Directed by Everardo Gout
- Corina" (2024) Feature film Directed by Urzula Barba Hopfner
- Un Mundo Para Mí" (2024) Feature film Directed by Alex Zuno
- Tengo que Morir Todas las Noches' (2024) Paramount Original Series, Directed by Ernesto Contreras & Alex Zuno
- El Secreto Del Rio' (2024) Netflix Original Series, Directed by Ernesto Contreras, Alba Gil & Alex Zuno
- Celda 211' (2025) Netflix Original Series, Directed by Gerardo Naranjo and Jaime Reynoso
- Yellow' (2025) HBO Original Series, Directed by Sofía Auza and Silvana Aguirre
- I´m Not Scared' (2026) Netflix Original Series, Directed by Alba Gil, Alex Zuno & Ernesto Contreras

His composition works also include scores for the short films:

- Contratiempo (2003) Directed by Mauricio Bidault
- Nia (2006) Directed by Francisco X. Rivera
- Ita Yuyu (2003) Directed by RAFA devillamagallón
- The Other Room (2006) Directed by Acán Coen
- El Hombre que no Podía Llorar (2007) Directed by Emilio Aguilar
- Revolucion S.A. de C.V. (2008) Directed by Emilio Aguilar
- Dejad que los niños (2008) Directed by Alfonso Virues
- Zeviathan (2010) Directed by Iker Orozco
- Pandemonium Nazi (2012) Directed by Jorge Diez De Bonilla Fuchs
- Azul (2012) Directed by Danel Nehmad
- Bautizo (2012) Directed by Laurette Flores
- Victoria (2015) Directed by Gilbo Jiménez
- Y Mañana otra vez (2017) Directed by Gilbo Jiménez
- Mamá (2017) Directed by Gilbo Jiménez
- Papá (2018) Directed by Gilbo Jiménez

Other works:

- Salvador (2008) (As Orchestrator) Directed by Victor Salcido
- Nación Apache (2009) (As Orchestrator) Directed by Carlos Muñóz
- La Abolición (Choral arrangements) (2010)
- Música de Fondo (Zoé MTV Unplugged) (Strings and Brass arrangements)
- Nada haces por mí (Juan Carlos Lozano) (2011) (Strings arrangements)
- Sofá Project (2011) (Composer and Musical Producer)
- El Fantástico Mundo de Juan Oról (2012) (Orchestrator and Music Programming)
- Dorian (New upcoming CD release) (2012) (Strings arrangements)
- Gangster Mexicano aka "Mexican Gangster" (2013) (Additional Music and String Arrangements)
- Jirón de Niebla (2014) Directed by Julio Cesar Estrada (Music Editor)
- Diez Años y un Día by Dorian (CD Release) (2015) (Strings Arrangements)
