= More Than Anything in the World =

2006 film

- Directed by: Andrés León Becker; Javier Solar
- Written by: Andrés León Becker; Javier Solar
- Starring: Elizabeth Cervantes
- Cinematography: Damian Garcia
- Release date: 28 March 2006
- Running time: 90 minutes
- Country: Mexico
- Language: Spanish

More Than Anything in the World (Spanish: Más que a nada en el mundo) is a 2006 Mexican drama film directed by Andrés León Becker and Javier Solar. It was entered into the 28th Moscow International Film Festival.

== Cast ==
- Elizabeth Cervantes as Emilia
- Juan Carlos Colombo as Hector
- Julia Urbini as Alicia
- Andrés Montiel as Mario
- Daniel Martínez as Doctor
- Silverio Palacios
