= Gabriel Soriano =

Mexican writer, director and producer (born 1971)

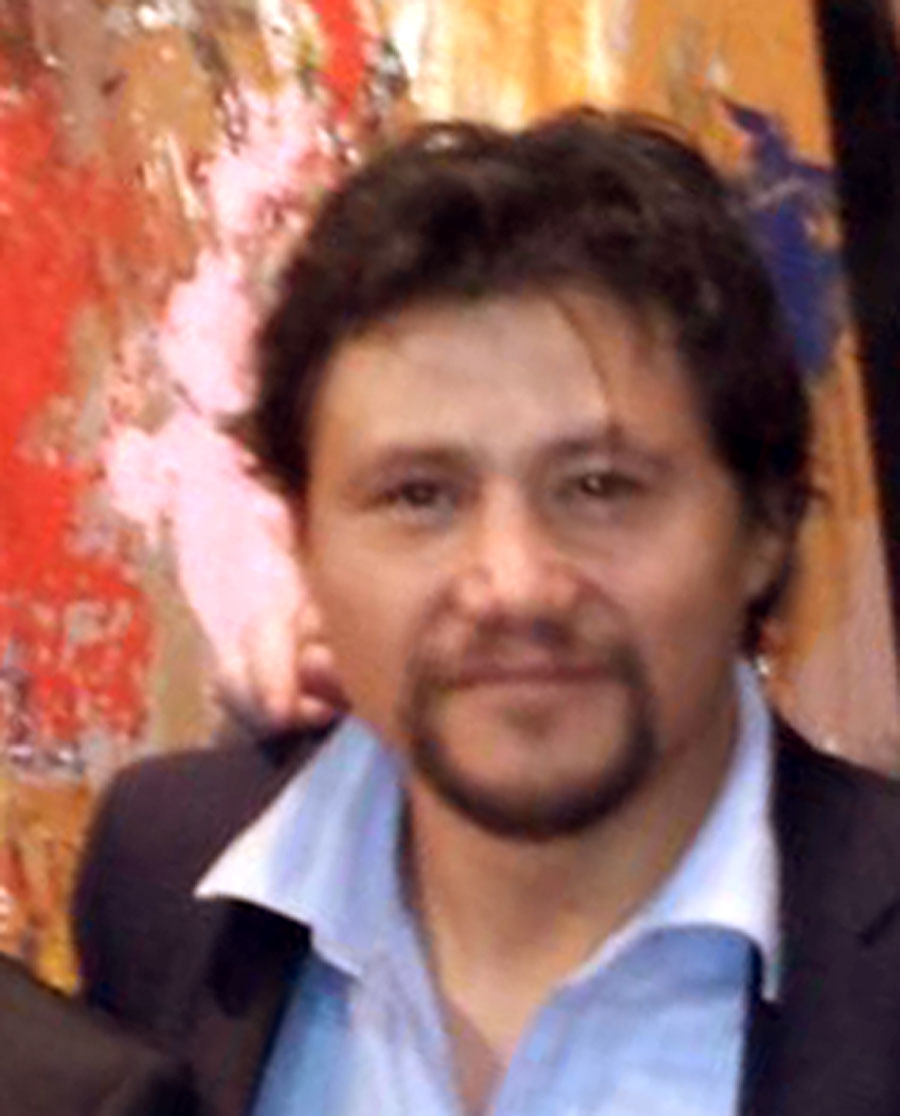
- Born: May 3, 1971 (age 53); Mexico
- Occupation(s): Film director, producer, screenwriter

Gabriel Soriano (born May 3, 1971) is a Mexican writer, director and producer.

== Early life ==
Soriano studied film in New York and produced and directed four feature films, including Seis días en la oscuridad. This film participated in several film festivals around the world and was nominated for the Best First Work, Ópera Prima, by the Society of Mexican Cinema Journalists, Asociación de Periodistas Cinematográficos de México. Gabriel is the founder and CEO of Paynal Media, an independent film production company based in Houston, Texas. Paynal also develops web sites and TV shows for Spanish audience.

== Filmography ==
Year	Film	Functioned as					Notes
Year	Film	Director	Writer	Producer	Actor	Role	Notes
1997	El Plan B			Yes			
2003	Seis dias en la oscuridad	Yes	Yes	Yes	Yes	Biker	
2004	El día menos pensado			Yes			Short
2004	Secreto de amor	Yes	Yes				
2004	The price of the american dream II		Yes				
2005	La cama de Lola	Yes	Yes	Yes			
