= Ita Yuyu =

Ita Yúyu
- Directed by: RAFA devillamagallón
- Written by: A.trillo
- Produced by: Manuel Meza Cuervo
- Starring: Martina Rojas Nava; Taurino Rojas González; Evelia Cortez Olea; Paulino Mendoza Gálvez; Montserrat Oropeza; Rafael de Villa
- Cinematography: Rafael de Villa
- Edited by: Rafael de Villa
- Music by: Gus Reyes
- Release date: 2003
- Countries: Mexico; Guerrero
- Languages: Mixteco; Spanish

"Ita Yúyu" (Dewflower) is a Mexican short film made in the mountains of Guerrero State, one of the poorest regions in Mexico.

Directed by Rafael de Villa Magallón (credited as RAFA devillamagallón), Ita Yúyu tells the story of a mixteca girl. Despite the death of her parents and the context she experiences every day in a small indigenous community, she hasn't lost her innocence and her hope in the world.

The story follows her life and the struggles it involves. Poverty, nonexistent health-care, lack of medicines and abuse are some of the issues Ita Yúyu has to deal with until she decides to fight for things that really matter.

== Plot ==
Ita Yúyu (Martina Rojas) is a ‘mixteca’ girl who lives in the mountain region of the state of Guerrero, in South Mexico. Despite the death of her parents and the conditions she experiences every day in a small indigenous community, she hasn't lost her innocence and her hope in the world.

Yuyu has spent five years trying to watch a videotape showing her parents, who died of an infection, in their last appearance. Watching the videotapes is not easy in her community, so she tries to watch the video when reporters visit the place. This goal will change her life and lead her to travel to Mexico City.

During her search she meets her best friend (Evelia Cortez), a quiet indigenous girl about her age who has always lived in the community; a brave man called Faustino Esteban (Taurino Rojas), her uncle and leader of an indigenous social organization; three reporters (Montserrat Oropeza, Rafael de Villa y Eduardo Paniagua) from the city, who ccome to the region to make a report about its situation but do not understand the reality of the place and its limitations and one of the policemen (Paulino Mendoza), who occasionally sleep with her but does not care about her concerns.

The story is about her life and the struggle it involves. poverty, inexistent healthcare, lack of medicines and abuse are some of the issues Ita Yúyu has to deal with until she decides to fight for things that ‘really matter’.

== Awards and festivals ==
- V Festival Pantalla de Cristal.

Best Fiction Short Film Best Casting in a Short Film

Nominated for Best Postproduction in a Short Film

- Rencontres Cinémas d'Amérique Latine de Toulouse

Participation in the section Cinéma & Vidéo des Peuples Indigènes
