= Seis días en la oscuridad =

2003 film by Gabriel Soriano

Seis dias en la oscuridad
- Directed by: Gabriel Soriano
- Written by: Gabriel Soriano
- Produced by: Robert Kistner; Gabriel Soriano
- Starring: Ludwika Paleta; Omar Garcia; Mauricio Fernandez; Mario Zaragoza; Gustavo Sánchez Parra; Jose Sefami; Hugo Stiglitz; Dario T Pie
- Cinematography: Aram Diaz
- Edited by: Roberto Bolado
- Production company: Guerrilla Films
- Distributed by: Video Cine (Mexico); Laguna Films (USA)
- Release date: April 15, 2003
- Running time: 97 minute
- Country: Mexico
- Language: Spanish
- Budget: $27,689
- Box office: $128,689

Seis dias en la oscuridad, also released as Six Days in the Dark, is a 2003 film written and directed by Gabriel Soriano and starring Ludwika Paleta, Dario T. pie and Gustavo Sánchez Parra. In this urban thriller set in Mexico City three rich kids, Claudio (Omar Garcia), Vampiro (Mauricio Fernandez) and Juan Carlos (Alan Bitter) enjoy a carefree life until Claudio is blamed for a car crash. To pay the corrupt police officers who are after him the friends decide to stage Claudio's kidnapping. The film was screened in several festivals, including Guadalajara International Film Festival, San Diego Film Festival, Mar del Plata Film Festival and Festival del Cinema Latinoamericano di Trieste.

== Plot ==
On a dark Mexican roadside, Claudio calls his friends and tells them he needs to meet them. Claudio tells them he is being extorted by two policemen after running someone over. Two corrupt cops demand 200,000 pesos to cover up the manslaughter charge for the accident. Vampiro thinks the only way Claudio can get the money quickly, is to stage his own kidnapping and get Claudio's rich father to pay. The execute the plan and his father pays the ransom; leaving the money in the garbage basket of a local nightclub. Later on, Claudio asks his friends to leave him on the highway to pay off the corrupt cops. The next morning when Vampiro arrives at university he's called to the principal's office where two police officers are waiting together with Ximena, (Claudio’s girlfriend) and Marsolo. After the police inform them that Claudio has been kidnapped, the pair lie and claim to know nothing.

The police officers set up in Emilio Hadaf's house (the father of Claudio) and wait for the kidnappers to call for a new ransom. Emilo tells the Police he does not trust Vampiro. The police then interrogate Vampiro, who tells them that Claudio was in trouble with a bookie and had a gambling problem. The police go to the bookie Salmun, who tells them that Claudio was supposed to meet his partner Isaias Jennings to pay him 200,000 pesos he owes them the night he was kidnapped.

Ximena sits in her room watching old videos of Claudio and his friends. A friend knocks on her door and tells her that Claudio was not an angel and reveals to her that he once had a serious problem with the psychology teacher. The next day, Ximena asks the teacher to tell him what happened between him and Claudio, the teacher tells her that Claudio stole his car and sold it in pieces in response for having failed in a mid-term. The teacher accuses Claudio of playing with everybody and having not been kidnapped at all. While at Hadaf's house the kidnapper contacts with Agent Mondragon and begins a negotiation with him. The voice over the telephone claims 2 million pesos as a ransom but the agent tells him that they are not in the position to pay such amount of money without a guarantee that Claudio is alive. Claudio is sitting on a chair in a basement, tied and blindfolded whilst a man watches.

The police search the area where Claudio was seen last and they find the body of Isais Jenning; lying in the grass with a gunshot in his back. Hadaf agrees to pay the ransom, a mysterious man picks up the money in the reservoir where Hadaf left it. Claudio sits in the dark basement while Marsolo waits sitting in front of him. Vampiro arrives with the money, but Marsolo decides to go even further.

== Cast ==
- Mauricio Fernandez as Vampiro
- Ludwika Paleta as Ximena Lagaspi
- Omar Garcia as Claudio Hadaf
- Alan Bitter as Juan Carlos Marsolo
- Mario Zaragoza as Detective
- Gustavo Sánchez Parra as Kidnapper
- José Sefami as Salmun
- Hugo Stiglitz as Professor Rodriguez
- Gabriel Porras as Federal
- Luis Couurieri as University Principal
- Gustavo Ganem as Mr. Haddaf
- Maria de la Luz Sendejas as Mr. Haddaf Maid
- Dario T Pie as Jenings
- Gabriel Soriano as Biker

== Production ==
=== Development ===
In 1998 Gabriel Soriano sold his Adventures Video Co. to raise funds for the production of his first feature film. With $27,000 he decided to develop and shoot a movie with a working title called Still Life and set up a small project office in Mexico City. After a chance encounter attending a seminar by the screenplay guru Syd Field, the director met Juan Pablo Cortes who joined the team as an Executive Producer. Together Aaram Diaz as cinematographer also joined the project, with the rest of the crew formed of aspiring students from CCC and CUEC film schools.

The film began production in December 2001 with a budget of $27,000 US. The small budget entailed financial difficulties which meant that Director Gabriel Soriano had to sell his car to finish shooting.

==== Title ====
The original title of the project was Naturaleza Muerta but the distribution company changed it to Seis dias en la Oscuridad.

=== Casting ===
Several actors and actress auditioned for the film including Ana de la Reguera, Gael García Bernal and Ana Serradilla but the small budget caused different actors to star in the film.

=== Art direction ===
Zoe Castro was in charge of art direction and Martha Arauz was in charge of costume design

=== Filming ===
Principal photography for Seis dias en la oscuridad started in Mexico City in December 2001. The film was shot on 35 mm film. After 15 shooting days, the film ran out of money; it took 1 year for investor Robert Kistner to finish the production. The film finally wrapped up principal photography in late July 2002.

=== Editing ===
The editing for Seis dias en la oscuridad took 2 months at the Guerrilla Film Studios in Churubusco, Mexico.

=== Music ===
The film features both original as well as existing music tracks. Tracks composed specifically for the film include "Hoy te extrañe" by Lino Nava and Marco Antonio Muñiz's cover of Luis Alcaras's classic "El dinero no es la Vida". The soundtrack was produced by BMG Mexico records and includes songs performed by Kinki, Jumbo and La Lupita.

== Distribution ==
=== Marketing ===
The first teaser poster was designed by Gabriel Soriano.

=== Release ===
Seis dias en la oscuridad was released on April 14, 2003, in Mexico by Videocine.

== See also ==
- Ludwika Paleta
- Gabriel Soriano
- Hugo Stiglitz
