= Zurdo =

- Directed by: Carlos Salces
- Written by: Blanca Montoya; Carlos Salces
- Produced by: Blanca Montoya; Mónica Lozano
- Starring: Alex Perea; Arcelia Ramírez; Alejandro Camacho; Blanca Salces
- Distributed by: Altavista Films
- Release date: 2003
- Running time: 110 minutes
- Country: Mexico
- Language: Spanish

Zurdo is a 2003 Mexican fantasy adventure film, directed by Carlos Salces from the same company that produced Amores Perros.

Translated from Spanish, the title means "Lefty."

== Plot ==
A young boy called Lefty is a gifted marble player who lives in an urban housing complex. One day a stranger arrives claiming to know the best marble player in the world and challenges Lefty to a contest. The news sends the townspeople into a frenzy and they put all their hopes and dreams into their little hero winning much more than a simple game of marbles. With success well within his grasp, Lefty is faced with a dilemma when a corrupt local official comes along to sabotage his chances.

== Music ==
The music is by Mexican composer Eduardo Gamboa, and Paul van Dyk, they won an Ariel (Mexican Oscar) for their work. The soundtrack has been released also in the form of an album.
