= Carlos Salces =

Mexican filmmaker

Carlos Salces is a Mexican filmmaker. He is known for his 2003 film Zurdo ("Lefty").

== Career ==
Salces' passion for films began at age 11 while working as an actor in Redondo by Raúl Busteros. He began working in feature films with prominent Mexican directors, involving himself with all aspects of filmmaking and developing his first video shorts and documentaries. In 1990, he directed Aquí No Pasa Nada (Nothing Happens Here), his first feature-length home video.

He established himself working as an editor in 1993 for various feature films and in the same year he directed the short film Cuarto Oscuro (Dark Room).

== Filmography ==
- 6M (2004)
- Zurdo ("Lefty") (2003)
- Las Olas del Tiempo ("The Waves of Time") (2000)
- En el espejo del cielo ("In the Mirror of the Sky") (1998)
- Cuarto oscuro ("Dark Room") (2002)
- Mi primer año (My First Year) (1992)
- Aquí no pasa nada (Nothing Happens Here) (1990)
- El Hallazgo (1987)

== Awards ==
In 1995 he received an Ariel Award from the Mexican Academy of Film, and the Critics and Press Association Award (Silver Goddess) for Best Editing for his work in Bienvenido-Welcome. In 1999 his short film En el Espejo del Cielo (In the Mirror of the Sky) was awarded with more than 40 international awards around the world in festivals, including Huesca, Palm Springs, Montreal, La Habana, Clermont-Ferrand, Berlin, Oberhausen, and the Mexican Academy Award for best short film among many others. His next short film Las Olas del Tiempo (The Waves of Time) was also selected for many international festivals and received the Europe Canal Plus Award among others.

Zurdo, his first feature film, had seven nominations for the Arieles (Mexican Films Awards) achieving four and ten nominations for the Silver Goddess (Mexican Press Awards) and won three. It also won the Jury's and the Press’ Awards at the Iberoamerican Film Festival in Montreal, 2004.
