= Broken Sky (film) =

- Film poster
- Directed by: Julián Hernández
- Written by: Julián Hernández
- Produced by: Roberto Fiesco
- Starring: Miguel Ángel Hoppe; Fernando Arroyo; Alejandro Rojo; Ignacio Pereda; Klaudia Aragón; Clarissa Rendón
- Cinematography: Alejandro Cantú
- Edited by: Emiliano Arenales Osorio
- Music by: Arturo Villela
- Release date: 2006
- Running time: 140 minutes
- Country: Mexico
- Language: Spanish

Broken Sky (original Spanish title: El cielo dividido) is a 2006 Mexican drama film involving a love triangle between three young gay men. The film was directed and written by Julián Hernández.

== Plot ==
The movie revolves around a Gay love story between three young gay students. For Gerardo and Jonas it was love at first sight. Their passion only grew unafraid of displaying their affection in public nor in the school halls. Gerardo is an overly sensitive guy who is hopelessly in love with Jonas, an unpredictable and erratic guy. Jonas hangs out in a club and chats up a random guy, breaking Gerardo's feeble heart. Sergio enters our plot when Gerardo finds himself in this feeble state, seeking solace in his arms. Gerardo seems to be holding on to his old flame and also his new lover Sergio

== Cast ==
- Miguel Ángel Hoppe as Gerardo
- Fernando Arroyo as Jonás
- Alejandro Rojo as Sérgio
- Ignacio Pereda as Bruno
- Klaudia Aragon as Emilia
- Clarissa Rendón as María
