= Julián Hernández (filmmaker) =

Mexican multi-awarded filmmaker (born 1972)

- Born: Julián Hernández Pérez; 1972 (age 53–54); Mexico City, Mexico
- Education: Centro Universitario de Estudios Cinematográficos
- Occupation: Filmmaker
- Years active: 1992–present

Julián Hernández (born 1972 in Mexico City, Mexico as Julián Hernández Pérez) is a Mexican multi-awarded filmmaker. He won twice the Teddy Award at Berlin Film Festival with his movies Thousand Clouds of Peace Fence the Sky, Love, Your Being Love Will Never End (2003), and Raging Sun, Raging Sky (2009). He studied at the Centro Universitario de Estudios Cinematográficos (CUEC), from where he was expelled due to his gay-themed films during a homophobic administration, and was not mentioned as a serious director until he started winning international recognition. He has credited his use of cinematographic language to influences from filmmakers such as Michelangelo Antonioni, Leonardo Favio, Robert Bresson, and Alain Resnais. Hernández has directed more than 20 awarded short films (both documentaries and fictional), and became a gay-cinema icon for his feature films, including Broken Sky. Along with producer and director Roberto Fiesco, he founded Cooperativa Cinematográfica Morelos. which later became the prestigious production company Mil Nubes Cine, producing 29 films over two decades.

== Filmography ==
Hernández's movies are known for his approach to the cinematographic language in which he pays special attention to aesthetics. Many critics have compared his work with choreographies and praise his use of sequence shots.

Genre	Year	Spanish title (original title)	English title	Credited as				Notes
Genre	Year	Spanish title (original title)	English title	Director	Editor	Writer	Role	Notes
Short film	1992	Lenta mirada en torno a la búsqueda de seres a fines		Yes	Yes	Yes		
Short film	1993	La sombra inutil de quien ha nacido para un solo destino		Yes	Yes	Yes		
Short film	1993	Caer			Yes			
Short film	1993	Actos impuros			Yes	Yes		
Short film	1996	Por encima del abismo de la desesperación		Yes	Yes	Yes		
Short film	2000	Rubato lamentoso		Yes	Yes	Yes		
Short film	2000	Extravio			Yes	Yes		
Short film	2000	La vida es tan hermosa aún ahora		Yes	Yes			
Short film	2000	Diminutos del calvario	10 Minutes	Yes				
Film	2000	Hubo un tiempo en que los sueños dieron paso a largas noches de insomnio...	Long Sleepless Nights	Yes	Yes	Yes		
Short film	2001	El dolor		Yes		Yes		
TV series	2002	Clase 406	Clase 406				Production assistant	
Short film	2002	Arrobo				Yes		
Film	2003	Mil nubes de paz cercan el cielo, amor, jamás acabarás de ser amor	A Thousand Clouds of Peace	Yes		Yes		
Short film	2003	Vivir	To Live	Yes		Yes		
Short film	2004	Los ríos en tiempo de lluvia		Yes	Yes	Yes	Producer	
Short film	2004	Linternita		Yes		Yes		
Short film	2005	David				Yes		
Short film	2005	Fragmento de identidad		Yes	Yes	Yes	Producer	
Film	2006	El cielo dividido	Broken Sky	Yes		Yes		
Short film	2007	Bramadero		Yes		Yes		
Short film	2008	Paloma				Yes		
Short film	2008	En la luz del sol brillante					Still photographer	
Short film	2008	Vago rumor de mares en zozobra		Yes		Yes		
Film	2009	Rabioso sol, rabioso cielo	Raging Sun, Raging Sky	Yes		Yes		
Documentary	2009	La transformación del cine en música		Yes				
Short film	2010	Sucedió en un día		Yes		Yes		segment "Atmósfera"
Documentary	2011	¡Boom!					Self	
Documentary	2013	Quebranto	Disrupted			Yes		
Film	2013	Yo soy la felicidad de este mundo	I Am Happiness on Earth	Yes		Yes		
Short film	2013	Estatuas			Yes			
Short film	2014	Ramona			Yes			
Short film	2014	Nubes flotantes	Wandering Clouds	Yes		Yes		
Documentary	2015	Muchacho en la barra se masturba con rabia y osadía		Yes	Yes			
Short film	2015	Muchachos en la azotea		Yes				
Short film	2016	Causas corrientes de un cuadro clínico		Yes	Yes			
Short film	2016	Fisuras			Yes			
Documentary	2016	Club Amazonas			Yes			
Documentary	2017	Péplum			Yes			
Short film	2018	Photomaton			Yes			
Film	2018	Rencor tatuado	Tattoo of Revenge	Yes				
Short film	2020	El día comenzó ayer		Yes	Yes			
Film	2020	La diosa del asfalto	Asphalt Goddess	Yes				
Film	2024	Los demonios del amanecer	Demons at Dawn	Yes		Yes		

== Awards ==
Year	Nominee	Category	Result
Ariel Awards
2004	A Thousand Peace Clouds Encircle the Sky	Best Direction	Nominated
2004	A Thousand Peace Clouds Encircle the Sky	Best Screenplay Written Directly for the Screen	Nominated
2004	A Thousand Peace Clouds Encircle the Sky	Best First Work	Nominated
Berlin International Film Festival
2003	A Thousand Peace Clouds Encircle the Sky	Best Feature Film	Won
2009	Raging Sun, Raging Sky	Best Feature Film	Won
Bogota Film Festival
2003	A Thousand Peace Clouds Encircle the Sky	Best Film	Nominated
Lima Latin American Film Festival
2003	A Thousand Peace Clouds Encircle the Sky	Best First Work	Won
Torino International Gay & Lesbian Film Festival
2006	Broken Sky (Note: Tied with Stewart Main for 50 Ways of Saying Fabulous)	Special Jury Award	Won
