= A Thousand Clouds of Peace =

2003 Mexican film

- DVD cover
- Directed by: Julián Hernández
- Written by: Julián Hernández
- Produced by: Roberto Fiesco
- Starring: Juan Carlos Ortuno
- Cinematography: Diego Arizmendi
- Edited by: Emiliano Arenales Osorio; Jacopo Hernández
- Distributed by: Strand Releasing (USA)
- Release dates: 11 February 2003 (Berlin Film Festival); 2 April 2004 (U.S.); 15 October 2004 (Mexico)
- Running time: 83 minutes
- Country: Mexico
- Language: Spanish

A Thousand Clouds of Peace is a 2003 romantic drama film written and directed by Julián Hernández. Its original Spanish title is Mil nubes de paz cercan el cielo, amor, jamás acabarás de ser amor and alternative titles for it are A Thousand Clouds of Peace Fence the Sky, Love; Your Being Love Will Never End and A Thousand Peace Clouds Encircle the Sky.

== Plot ==
Not long after coming to terms with his homosexuality, 17-year-old Gerardo has broken up with his first serious boyfriend. Trying to ease his pain he has a number of casual sexual encounters in Mexico City.

== Cast ==
- Juan Carlos Ortuno as Gerardo
- Juan Torres as Bruno
- Perla de la Rosa as Anna
- Salvador Alvarez as Susana
- Rosa-Maria Gomez as Mary
- Mario Oliver as Umberto
- Clarisa Rendón as Nadia
- Salvador Hernandez as Antonio
- Pablo Molina as Andres
- Martha Gomez as Martha
- Manuel Grapain Zaquelarez as Jorge
- Miguel Loaiza as Adrian
- Llane Fragoso as Mirella
- Pilar Ruiz as Lola

== Reception ==
Movie review website Rotten Tomatoes gave A Thousand Clouds of Peace a "rotten" rating of 32% based on eight reviews. Metacritic gave it a "generally negative" rating of 35% based on 16 reviews.

In 2003 the film won the Teddy Award for Best Feature Film at the Berlin International Film Festival as well as the awards for Best First Work at the Lima Latin American Film Festival. In 2004 it won the Silver Ariel at the Ariel Awards in Mexico.
