= Querétaro (city) =

City and municipality in Querétaro, Mexico

Santiago de Querétaro
- City and municipality
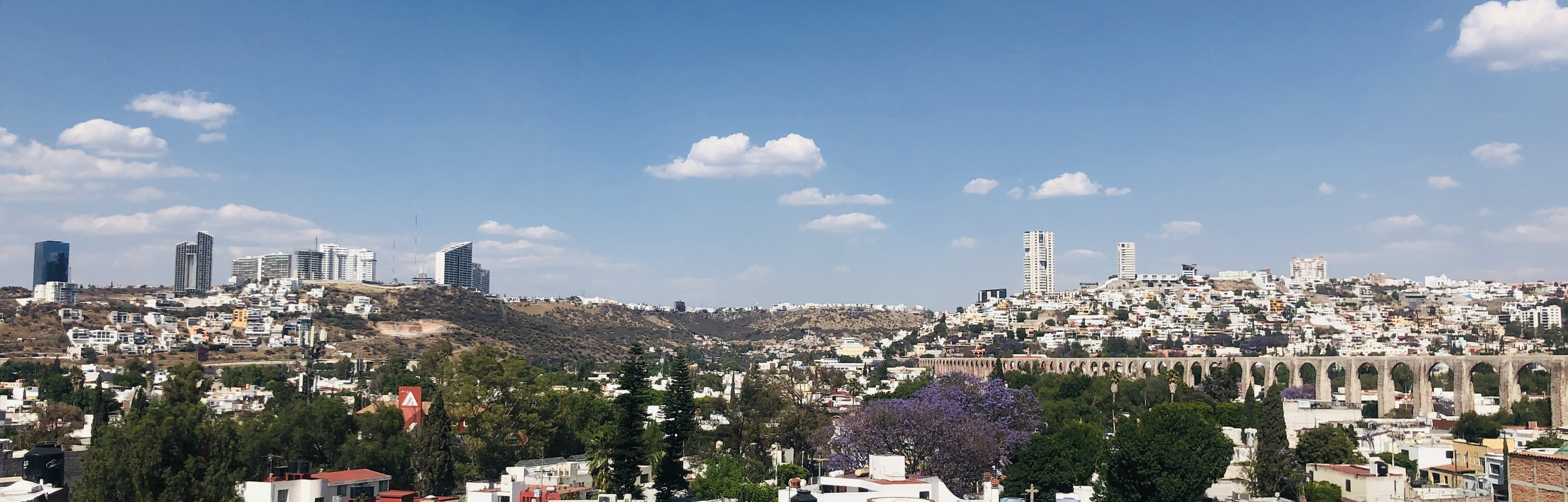
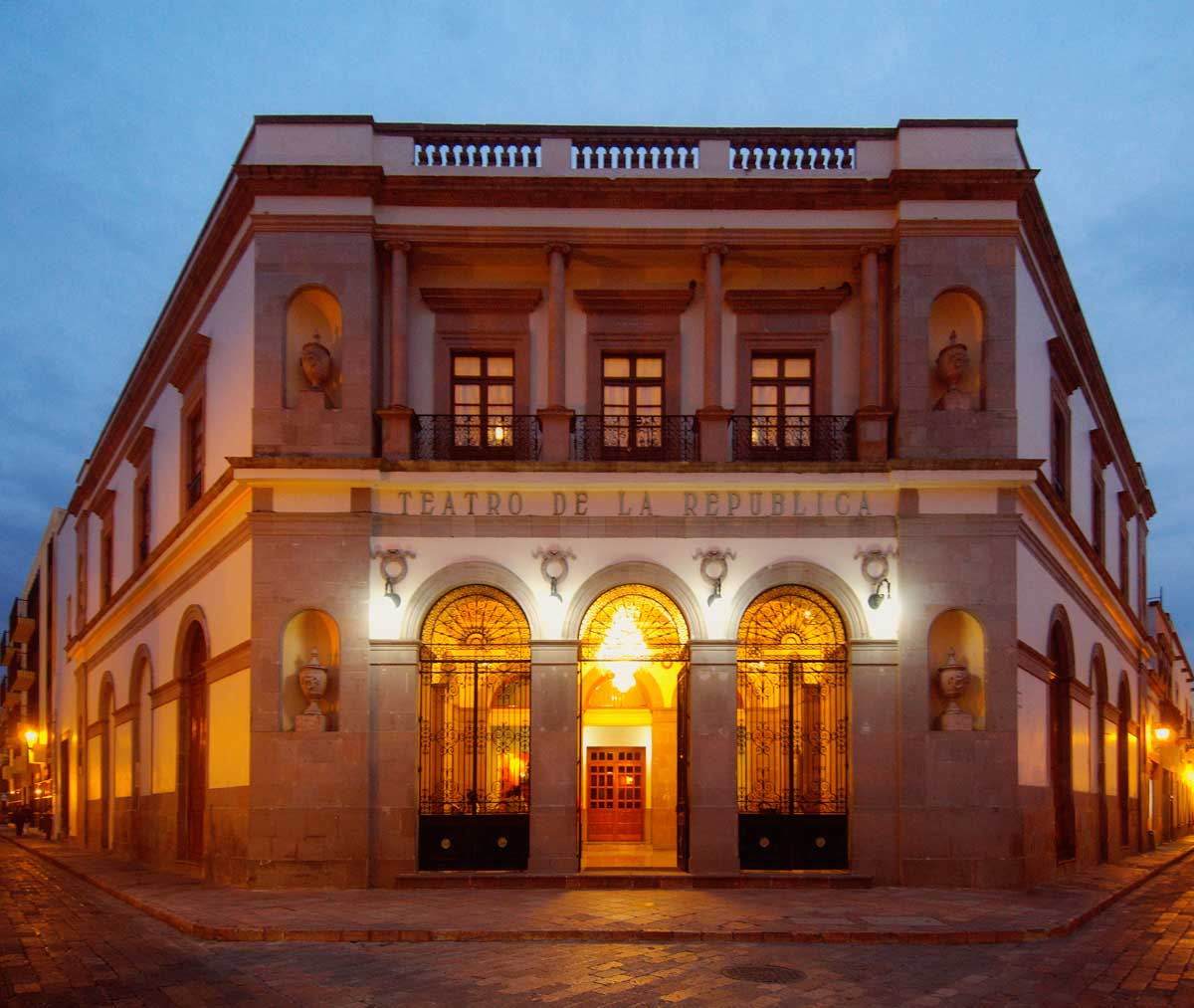
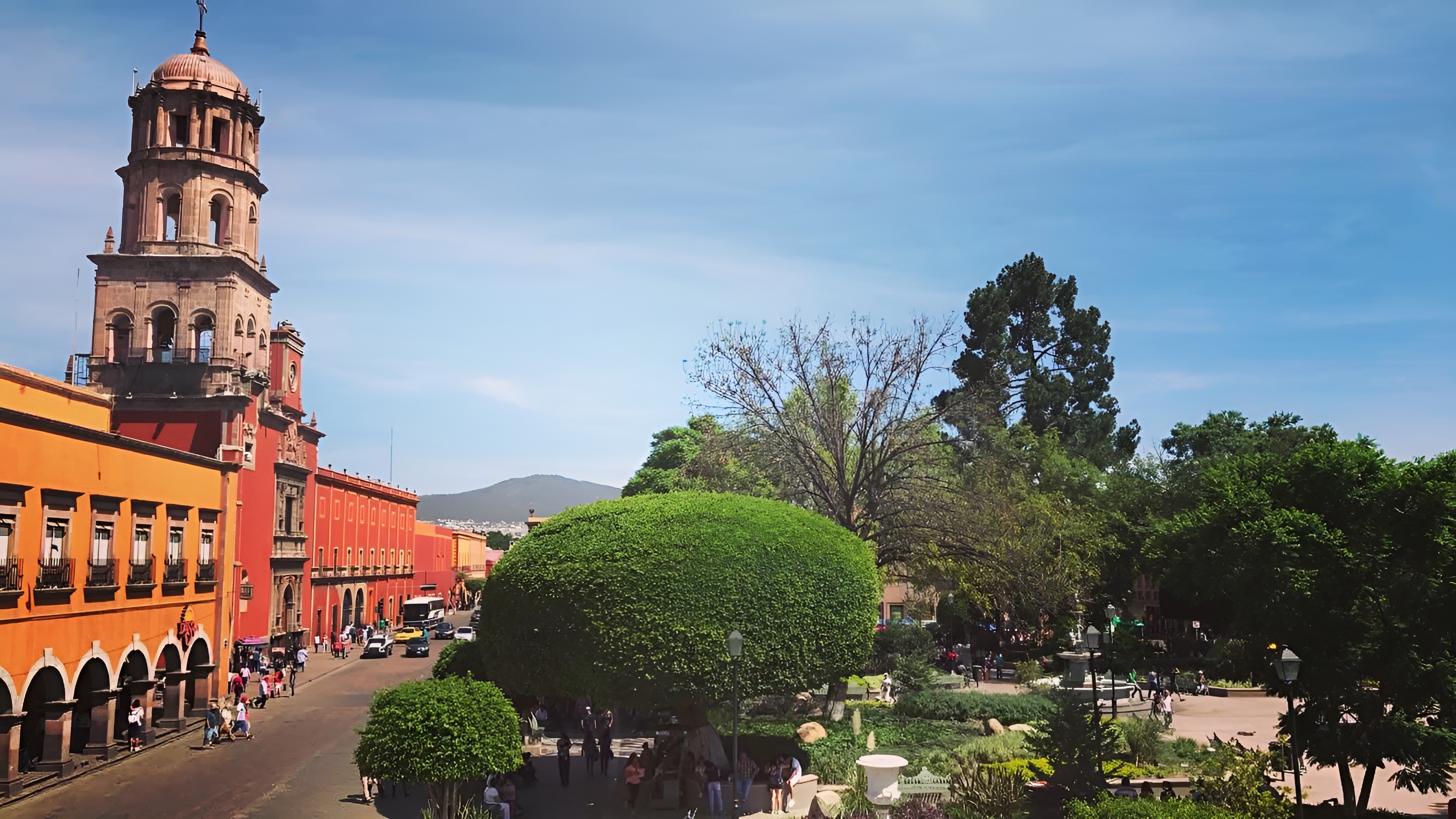
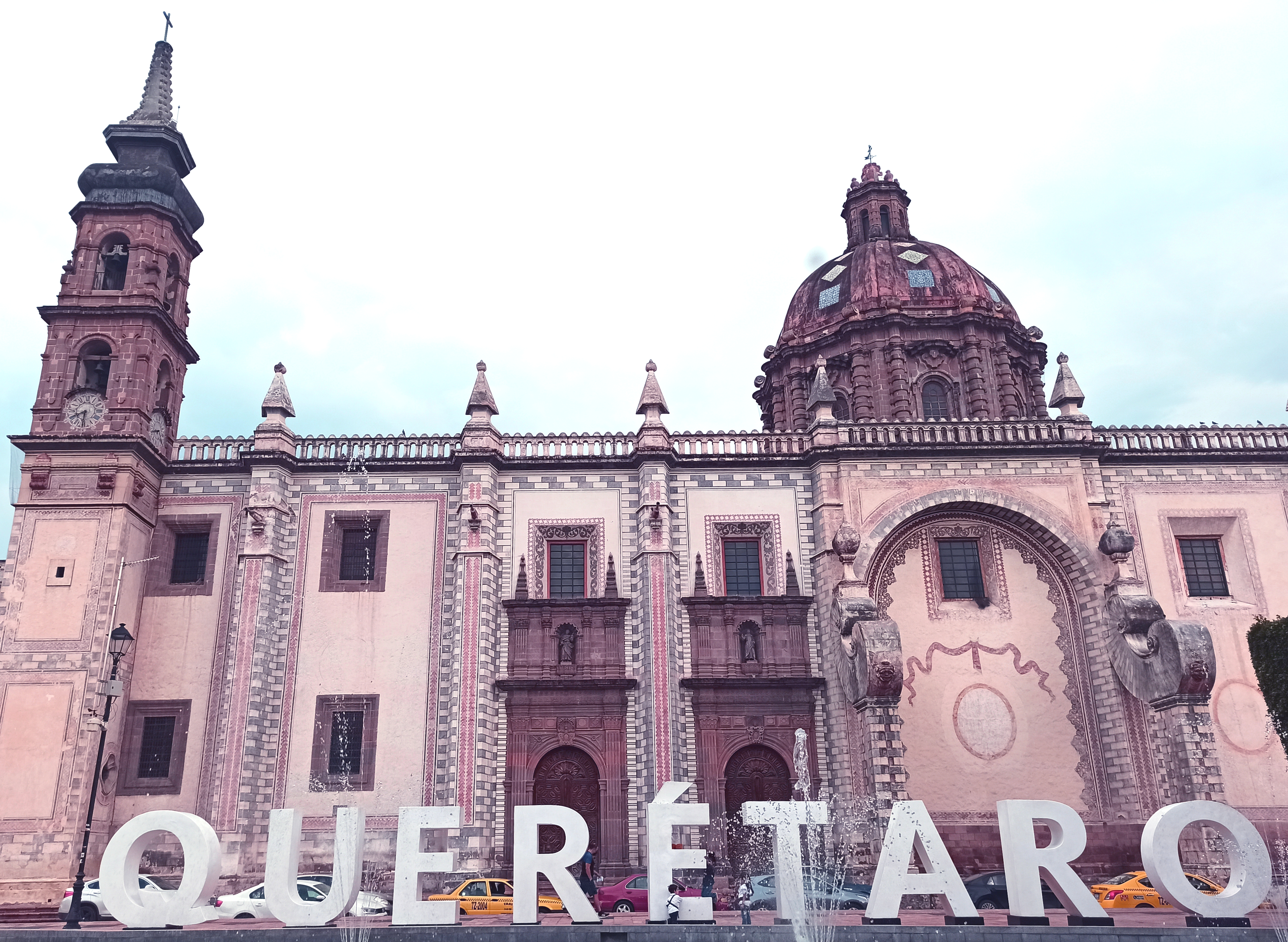
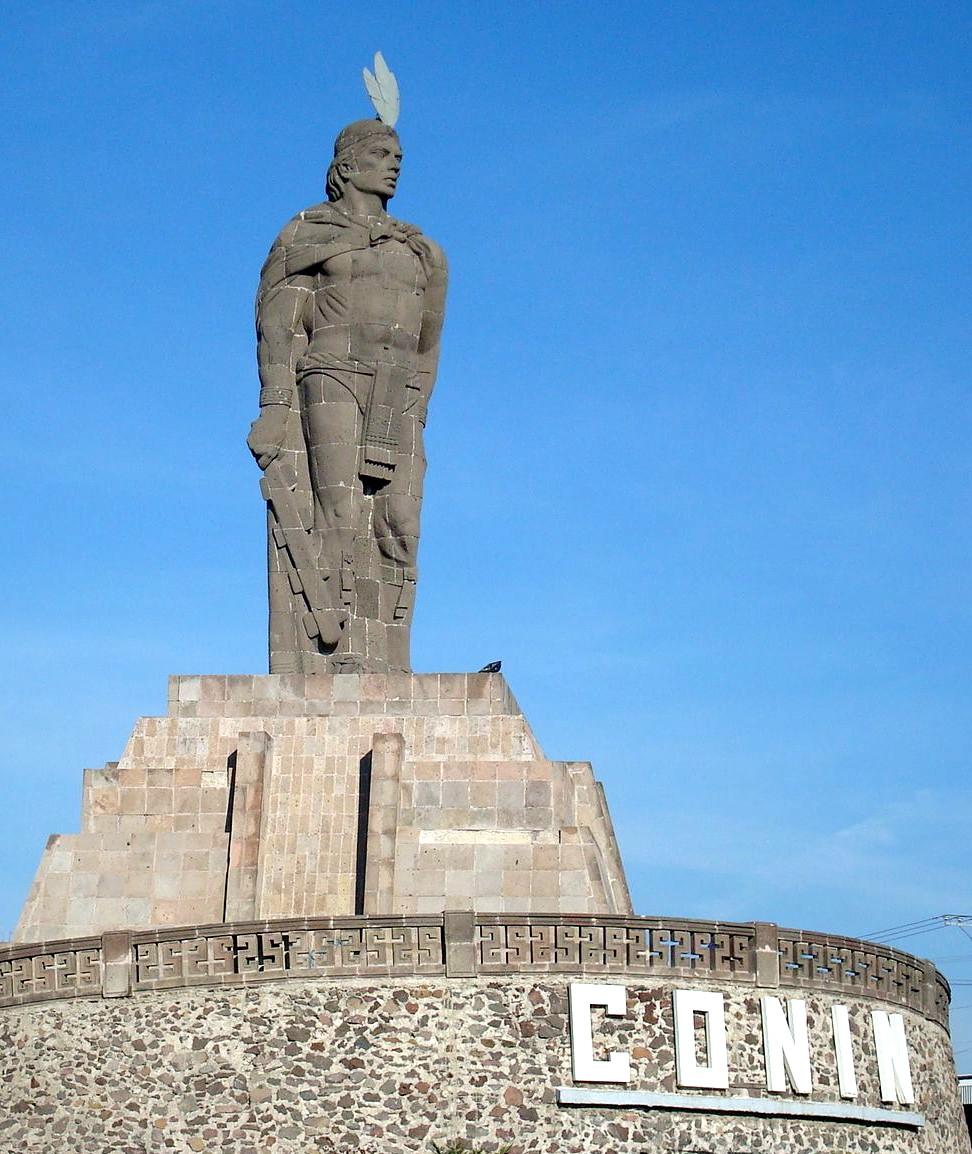
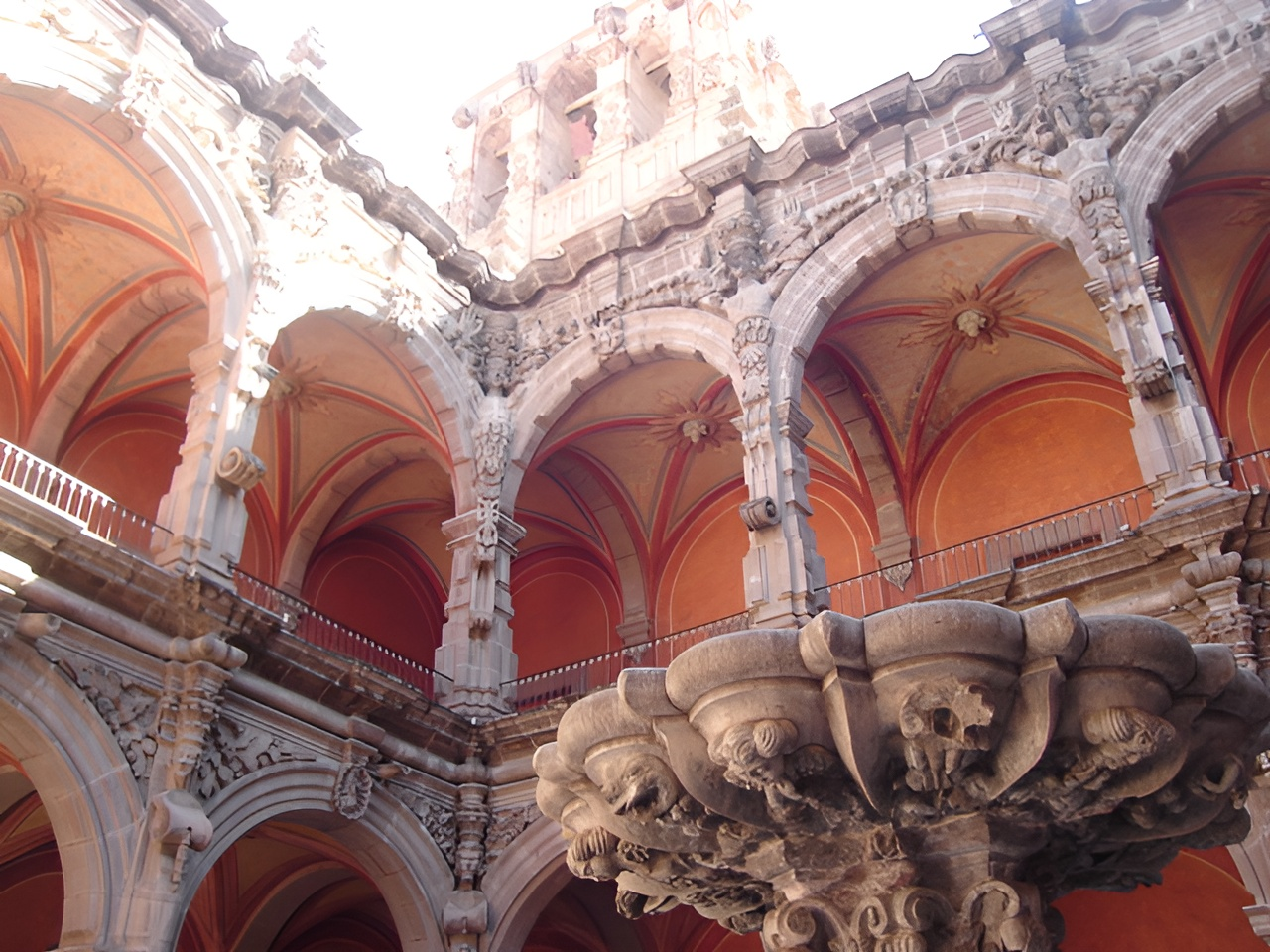
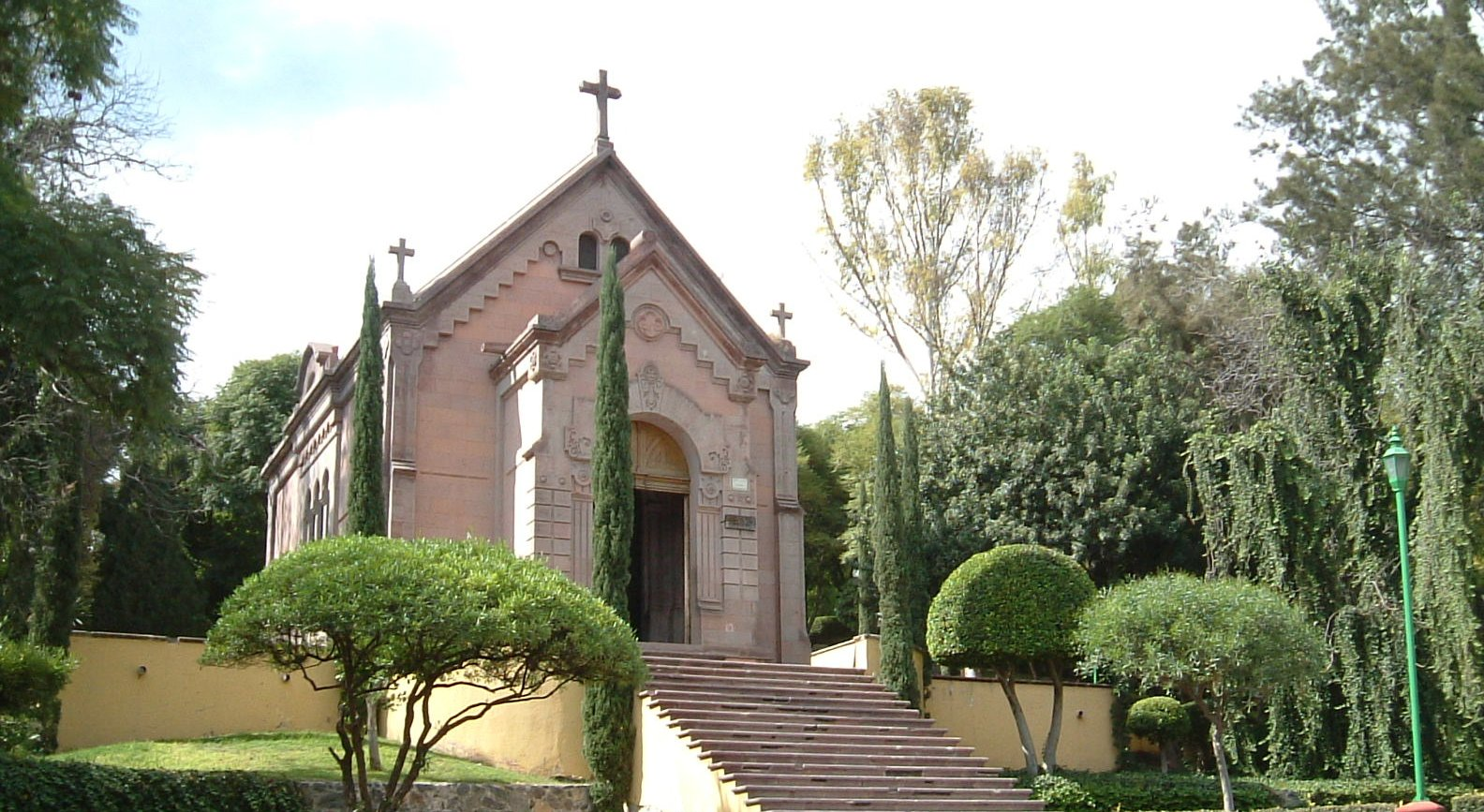
- Querétaro skyline and aqueduct Theater of the Republic Church of St. Francis of Assisi Church of St. Rose of Viterbo Monument to Conín Ex-monastery of St. Augustine (Art Museum of Querétaro) Emperor Maximilian's chapel at the Hill of the Bells

- Flag Coat of arms

- Location within Querétaro Location within Mexico
- Coordinates: 20°35′15″N 100°23′34″W
- Country: Mexico
- State: Querétaro
- Established: 25 July 1531
- Municipal Status: 1917

Government
  - Municipal President: Luis Nava

Area
  - Land: 363 km^{2} (140 sq mi)
- Elevation: 1,820 m (5,970 ft)

Population (2020)
  - City: 794,789
  - Density: 2,200/km^{2} (5,700/sq mi)
  - Municipality: 1,049,777
  - Metro: 1,594,912

GDP (PPP, constant 2015 values)
  - Year: 2023
  - Total: $38.5 billion
  - Per capita: $27,200
- Time zone: UTC−6 (CST)
- Postal code: 76000
- Area codes: 442/446
- Website: queretaro.gob.mx

UNESCO World Heritage Site
- Official name: Historic Monuments Zone of Querétaro
- Type: Cultural
- Criteria: ii, iv
- Designated: 1996
- Reference no.: 792
- Region: Latin America and the Caribbean

Santiago de Querétaro (Spanish pronunciation: [sanˈtjaɣo ðe keˈɾetaɾo]; Otomi: Dähnini Maxei), most commonly known as Querétaro, is the capital and largest city of the state of Querétaro, located in central Mexico. It is part of the macroregion of Bajío. It is 213 kilometers (132 mi) northwest of Mexico City, 63 kilometers (39 mi) southeast of San Miguel de Allende and 200 kilometers (120 mi) south of San Luis Potosí. It is also the seat of the municipality of Querétaro, divided into seven boroughs. In 1996, the historic center of Querétaro was declared a World Heritage Site by UNESCO.

The city is a business and economic center and a service center that is experiencing an ongoing social and economic revitalization. All this has resulted in high levels of migration from other parts of Mexico.

Querétaro has seen outstanding industrial and economic development since the mid-1990s. The Querétaro metropolitan area has a per capita GDP of US$20,000, second highest among Mexico's metropolitan areas after Monterrey. The city is the fastest-growing in the country, basing its economy on IT and data centers, logistics services, aircraft manufacturing and maintenance, call centers, the automotive and machinery industries, and the production of chemicals and food products. The region of Querétaro has a rapidly growing vineyards agriculture and hosts the famous wine producer from Spain Freixenet. Wine production in the state of Querétaro is now the second largest in Mexico after that of the Baja California region.

Major international corporations in the aerospace, electronics, automotive, chemical, food, and financial areas have their national headquarters in Querétaro.

== Etymology ==
In the Otomi language, it is referred to as "Maxei" or "Ndamaxei", which means ball game and the grand ball game respectively. In the Mendocino Codex the town is called Tlaschco or Tlaxco, from the Nahuatl word for ball game. However, Querétaro most likely comes from k'eri ireta rho, meaning place of the great people, especially since during Aztec times about 15,000 people lived here. Querétaro has an Aztec glyph to represent it as it was a tributary province. In 1655, it received a coat of arms from the Spanish Crown.

The word Querétaro was voted by 33,000 participants as "the most beautiful word in the Spanish language", before being approved by the Instituto Cervantes. In Pre-Columbian terminology, Querétaro literally means "the island of the blue salamanders". Nevertheless, other scholars suggest that it can mean "place of the reptiles" or "place of the giant rocks".

== History ==
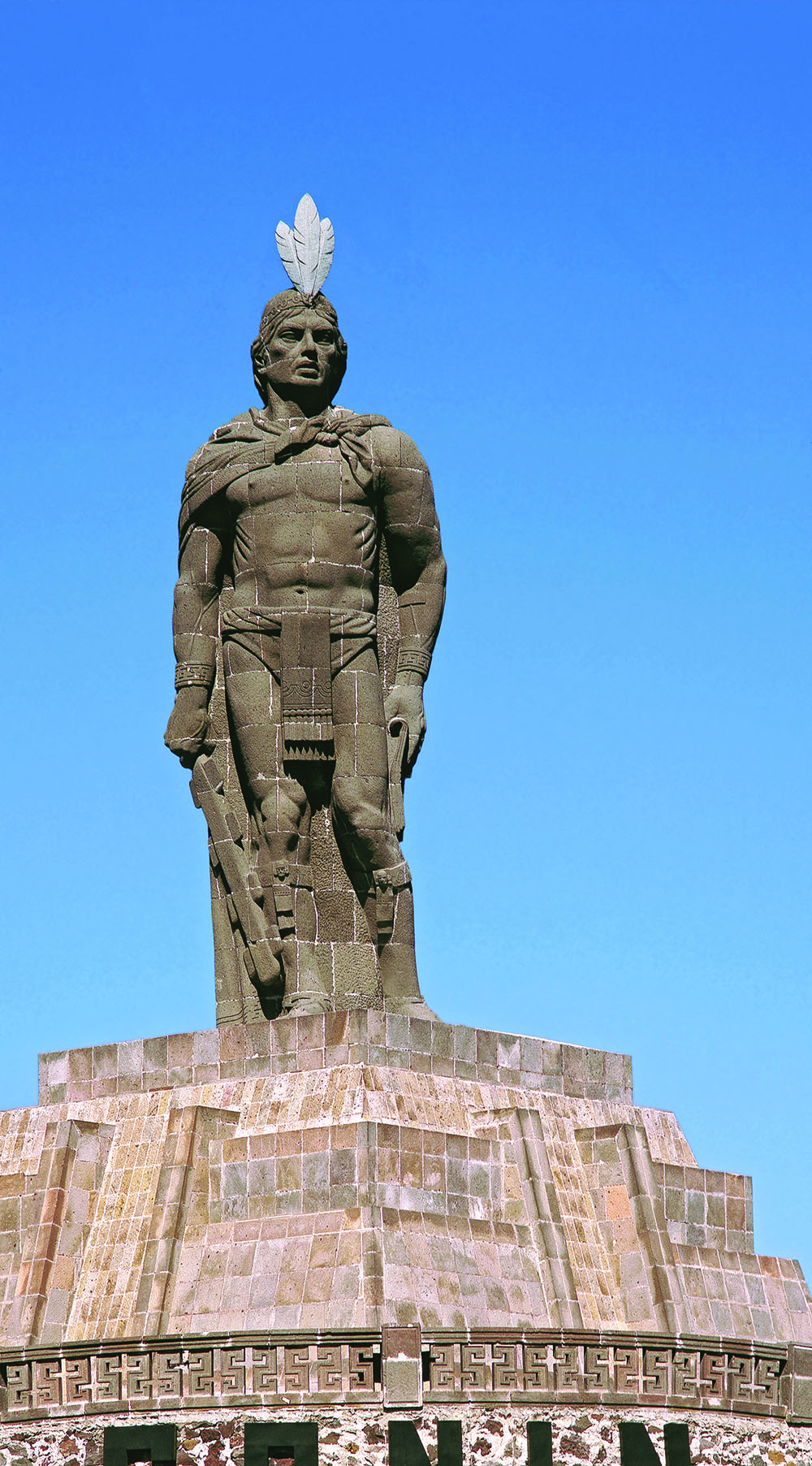
Statue of Otomi trader Conín de Xilotepeque, also known as Hernando de Tapia, founder of the city together with Juan Sánchez de Alanís in 1531.

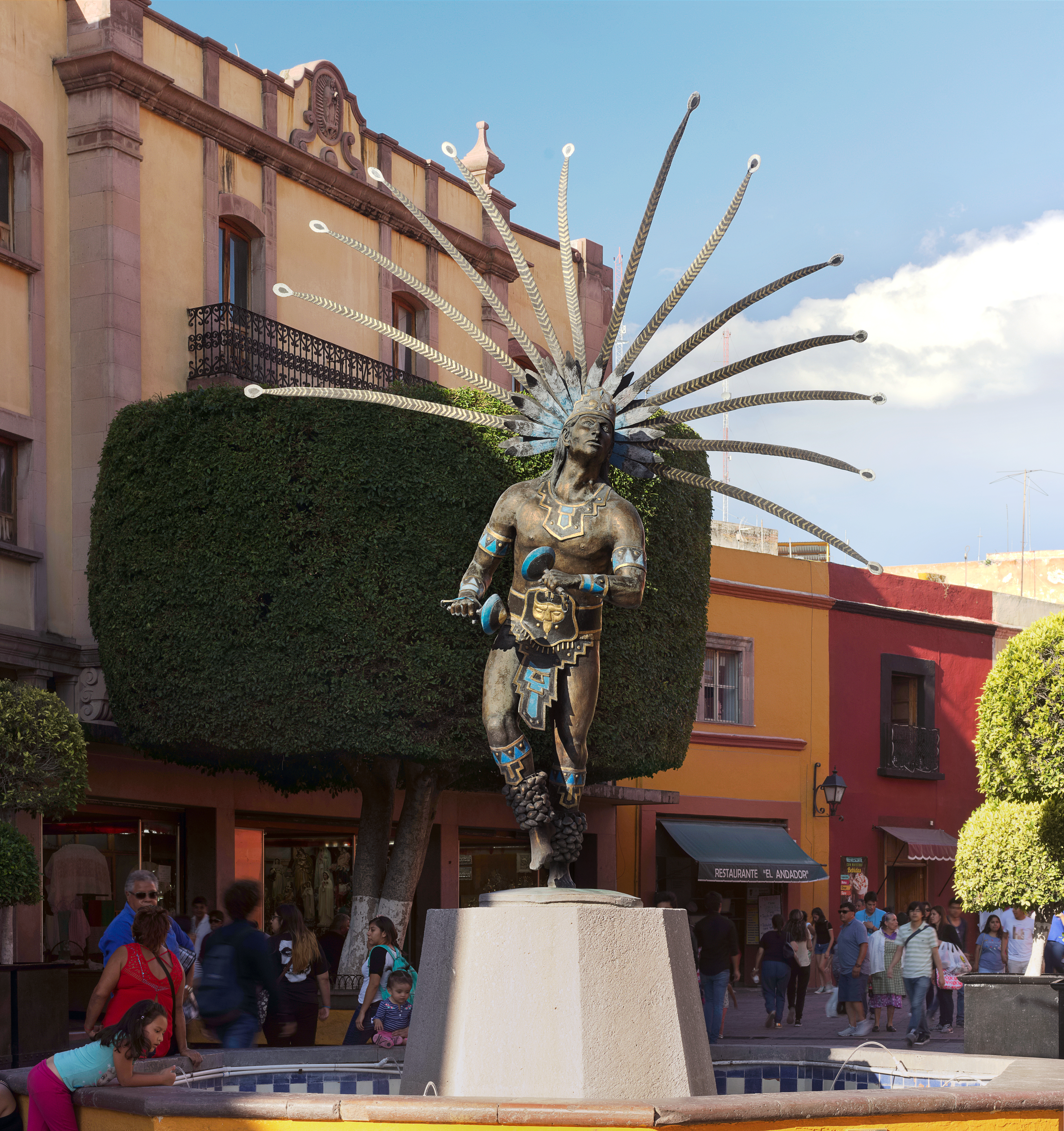
Statue of a traditional dancer in downtown.

=== Pre-Foundation ===
The area was settled around AD 200 by Mesoamerican groups moving north, and archeological sites here show Teotihuacan influences. From the Classic Period, there were two population centers in this area called Toluquilla and Las Ranas. The mountain now known as El Cerrito was a ceremonial center, but was later abandoned for unknown reasons. In the later pre-Hispanic period, the area was populated by the Otomi, who had become sedentary urban dwellers with sophisticated politics by the time of the Aztec Empire, who referred to them as the Tlacetilli Otomi or "Otomi Nation/State". This area was under control of the Otomi dominion of Xilotepeque in the 1440s, which in turn was subject to the Aztec Empire of Mexihco-Tenochtitlan. Under the reign of Ahuizotl in the late 15th century, the Aztecs administered the area directly, considering it a bulwark against the Chichimeca lands to the north. The Otomi were the most populous ethnicity in Xilotepec although there were other groups, primarily Chichimeca as well. These two groups are still found here today. During the pre-Hispanic and colonial times, the Otomi were organized into familial clan like groups with defined territories, living in stone, wood or adobe dwellings. They were sedentary farmers, who fought, but unlike the Aztecs, did not make warfare a large part of their culture.

=== Foundation ===
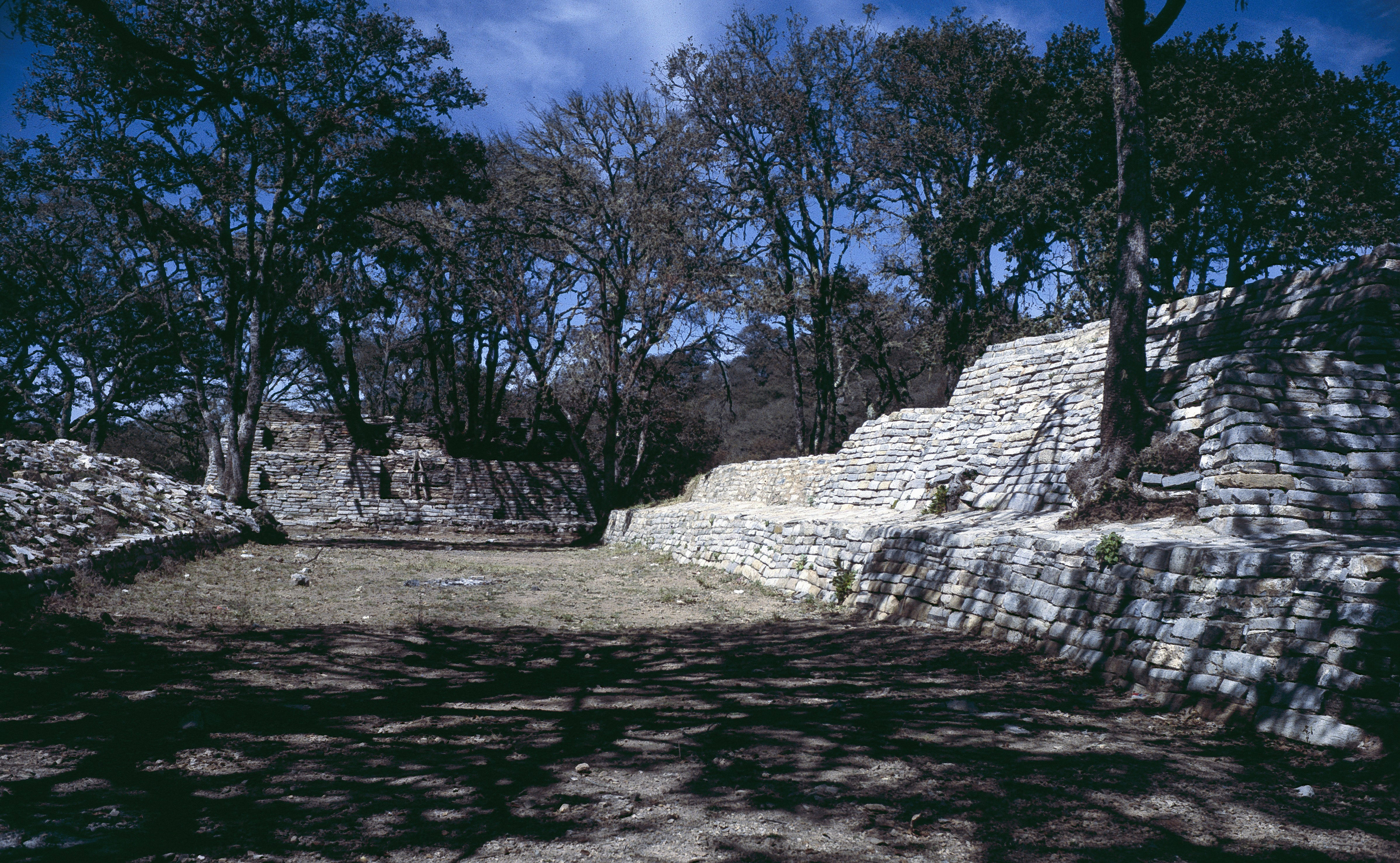
Aztec ballcourt of Las Ranas.

The Spanish city of Santiago de Querétaro was founded on 25 July 1531, when Spaniard Hernán Pérez Bocanegra y Córdoba arrived with the allied Otomi leader Conín (later named Hernando de Tapia) who was the administrative head of the Otomi peoples living in Aztec controlled territory. On this date, the Spanish and their Nahuan allies were battling the local insurgent Otomi and Chichimecas at a hill now known as Sangremal and which was called Ynlotepeque and considered sacred in pre-Hispanic times. Chronicles of this event, such as that written by Friar Isidro Félix de Espinoza, state that the Chichimeca were at the point of winning when a total eclipse of the sun occurred. This supposedly scared the Chichimeca and the Spanish claimed to have seen an image of Saint James (the patron saint of Spain) riding a white horse carrying a rose-colored cross. This event caused the Chichimeca to surrender. This event is why the city is called Santiago (Saint James) de Querétaro, with James as patron saint. A stone cross imitating the one the Spanish supposedly saw was erected on the hill, which later was accompanied by a church and monastery.

Spanish dominion, however, grew gradually, and was definitively not won through just a single battle. In the 1520s, the Otomis and many Chichimecas of what is now southern Querétaro and northern Mexico State allied with Hernán Cortés under the control of the lord of Xilotepeque, who still maintained a certain amount of control of the old dominion. The first Spanish arrived between 1526 and 1529, headed by Hernán Pérez de Bocanegra. Bocanegra at first tried non-violent means of subduing the area and founding a Spanish city. However, the initial attempts to establish the city of Querétaro were repelled by the locals, forcing Bocanegra south and establishing the cities of Huimilpan and Acámbaro.

Bocanegra continued negotiating with the lord of Xilotepeque, Conín. The lord's cooperation was gained, for which he was eventually credited for bringing an end to the Spanish-Chichime/Otomi conflict and was made the Spanish governor of the area. However, most of Querétaro's early colonial history was marked by skirmishes between the remaining Chichimeca insurgency and the Spanish authorities, with one of the first being over the establishment of encomiendas. Conín separated the indigenous and Spanish residents of the new city, with the indigenous on and around Sangremal hill and the Spanish around where the current historic center is. The Spanish part of the city was laid out by D. Juan Sanchez de Alaniz, and the indigenous section was laid out in the traditional Otomi manner. The first city council convened in 1535, and the settlement was named a Pueblo de Indios (Indian Village) in 1537, ending the encomiendas. During this time, the Franciscans arrived for missionary work, who were later joined by the Jesuits, the Augustinians and other who built monasteries such as the Monastery of San Francisco, Lima and the Monastery of Santa Cruz.

=== Peak of colonial era ===
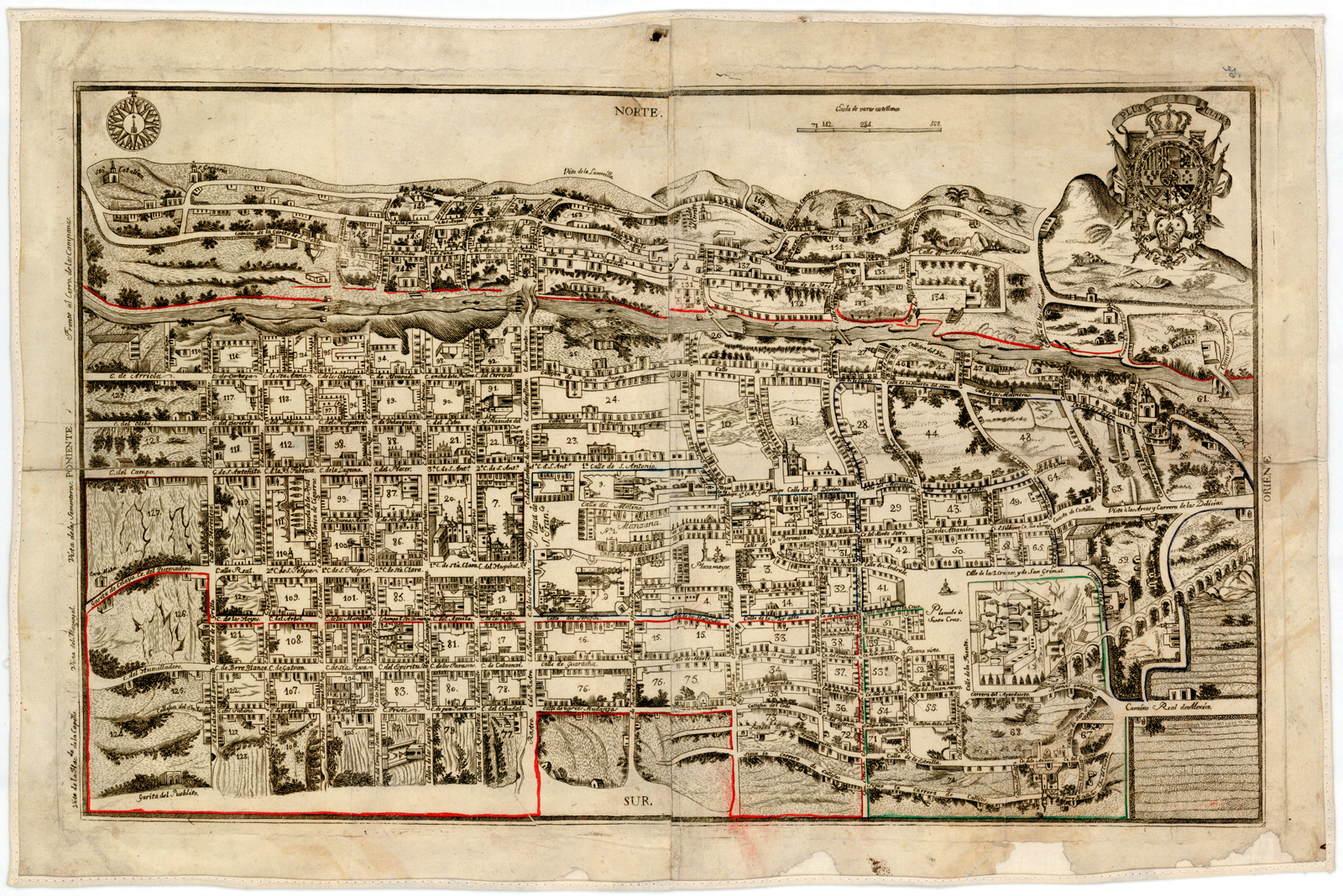
1796 street map of Santiago de Querétaro

The settlement was declared a town in 1606 and by 1655, only Spaniards were living in the city proper. In 1656, it was decreed as the "Muy Noble y Leal Ciudad de Santiago de Querétaro" (Very Noble and Loyal City of Santiago de Querétaro). This honor was solicited by Viceroy Luis de Velasco, in recognition of Querétaro's growth, agricultural production, industry and educational institutions. By the 18th century, it was informally known as the "Pearl of the Bajío" and "The Third City of the Viceroyalty".

By the 17th century, the Franciscans had been joined by the Dieguinos, who built the monastery of San Antonio, the Jesuits, who built the Colleges of San Ignacio and San Francisco Javier as well as the Dominicans, the Carmelites and the Royal Convent of Santa Clara de Asís, which was one of the largest and most opulent in New Spain. Querétaro was also the site for the training of many of the missionaries who went north as far as Texas and California. Most of these were educated at the Colegio de Propagación de la Fe (College for the Propagation of the Faith), which was established at the monastery of Santa Cruz in 1683. Some of its graduates even went as far as South America. Few of the buildings from the 16th century have remained intact, due to the violence during the city's initial development, which reached its peak in the 17th century. As a result, most of the city's oldest structures are of Baroque style.

=== Independence and capital status ===
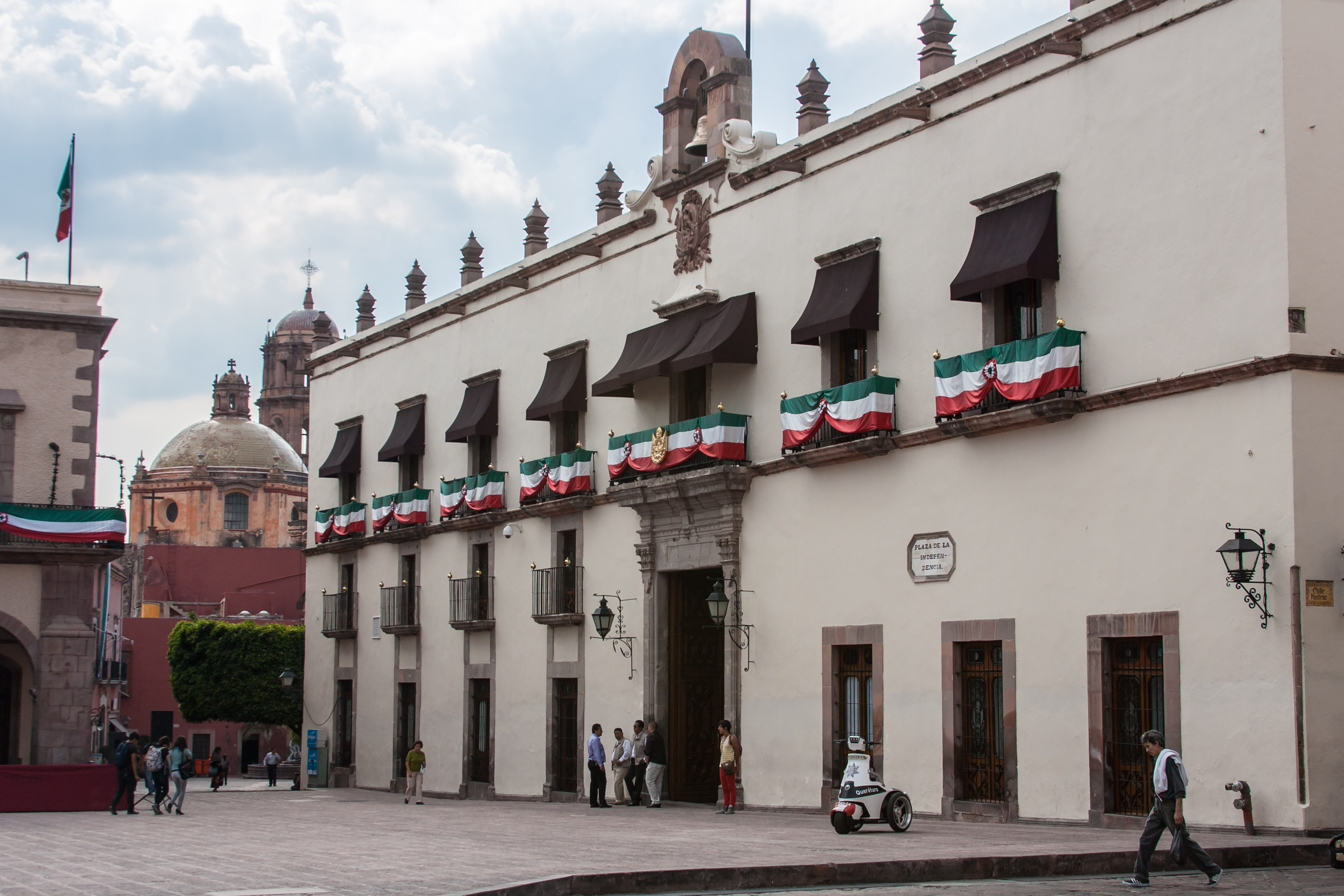
The Casa de la Corregidora, home of Doña Josefa Ortiz de Domínguez and Don Miguel Domínguez who actively participated in the early days of Mexico's independence. The building is now the seat of the executive branch of the state government.

Querétaro is considered to be one of the cradles of Mexican Independence and much of the credit is given to Josefa Ortiz de Domínguez. She was the wife of the city's mayor, called a corregidor, at the beginning of the 19th century. She used her prominent position to gather intelligence for the nascent insurgency.

Literary circles called tertulias were a popular pastime for the upper Creole classes, as they also served as a relatively safe place to discuss politics. One such occurred regularly at the house of José María Sánchez, with the name of the Asociación de Apatistas, which became a group dedicated to independence and winning supporters to the cause. Members included licenciados Lorenzo de la Parra, Juan Nepomuceno Mier y Altamirano, Manuel Ramírez de Arellano y Mario Lazo de la Vega José María Sánchez, Fray José Lozano, Antonio Tellez, don Emeterio y Epigmenio González, José Ignacio de Villaseñor Cervantes y Aldama, Dr. Manuel Marciano Iturriaga, Pedro Antonio de Septién Montero y Austri, Luis Mendoza, Juan José García Rebollo, Francisco Lojero, Ignacio Gutiérrez, Mariano Hidalgo, Mariano Lozada, José María Buenrostro, Manuel Delgado, Francisco Araujo, Felipe Coria, Francisco Lanzagorta, Ignacio Villaseñor and José María Sotelo. The group was visited on occasion by Ignacio Allende, Juan Aldama, Josefa Ortiz de Domínguez, Miguel Domínguez and Miguel Hidalgo y Costilla. This associación was important for the early organisation of those seeking independence for Mexico.

However the most famous of the tertulias was hosted by Josefa Ortiz de Domínguez herself at what is now the Palace of the Corregidora. Originally, they were open to both creoles and Spanish-born but after an altercation between Ignacio Allende and the Spaniard Crisóstomo López y Valdez, only creoles attended. The tertulias of Josefa Ortiz de Domínguez culminated in the Conspiracy of 1810, which was discovered before they had planned to act.

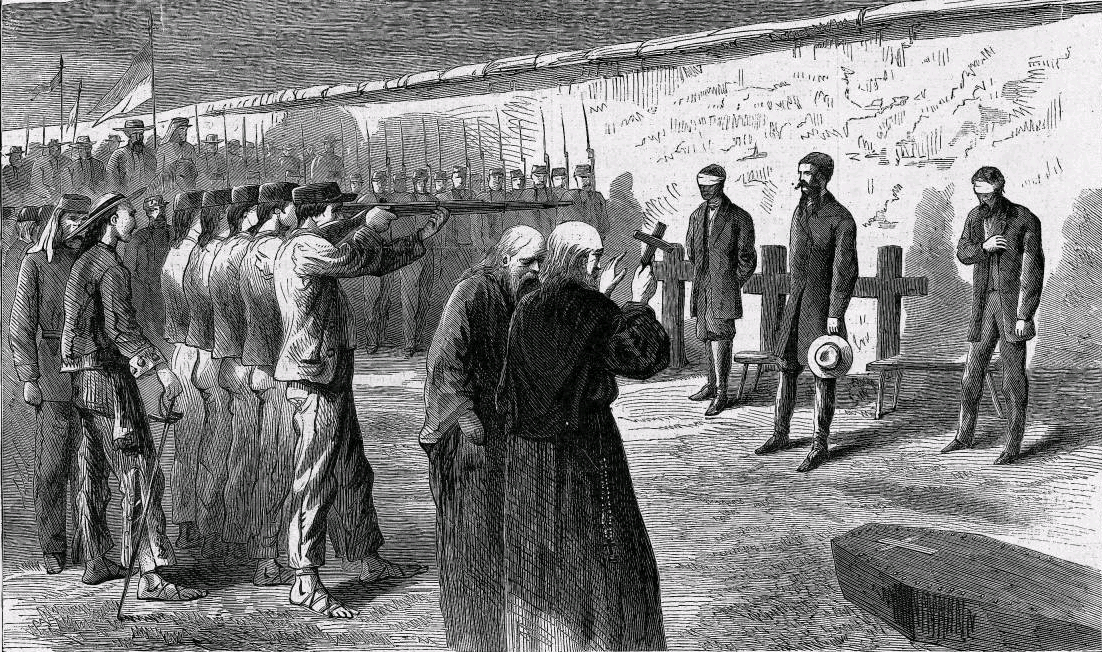
Emperor Maximillian and his generals, Mejía and Miramón, were executed by a firing squad at Querétaro on 19 June 1867.

On 13 September 1810, Epigmenio González was arrested for having stockpiled weapons for an insurgency and the next day Mayor Miguel Domínguez and his wife Josefa Ortiz de Domínguez were arrested for their roles in the Conspiracy of 1810. With the conspiracy discovered, she still managed to get a warning to Miguel Hidalgo. He eluded capture and rushed to Dolores, where he gave his famous grito (the cry for independence). For her actions, La Corregidora was imprisoned several times between 1810 and 1817. She died impoverished and forgotten, but was later remembered when she became the first woman to appear on a Mexican coin. Once the armed battle began, the city was taken by the royalist army and was the last major city to be taken by the insurgents.

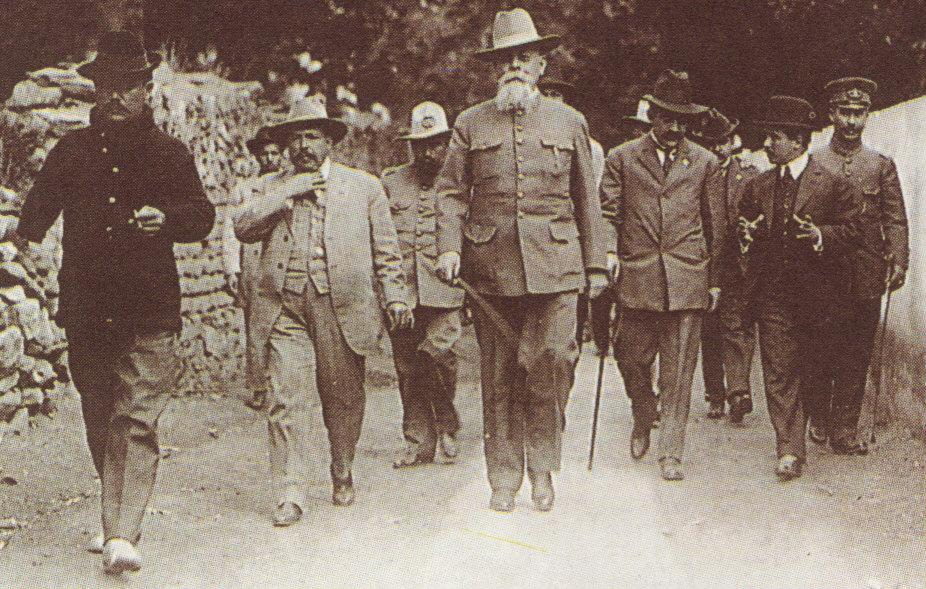
Venustiano Carranza and other leaders of the Mexican constitutionalist movement in Querétaro in 1916.

After the end of the war, Santiago de Querétaro became the capital of the state of Querétaro in 1823, with the first state congress convening at the Auditorium of the Instituto de Bellas Artes de la Universidad Autónoma de Querétaro in the city. The state's first constitution was promulgated in the city in 1825, with the city as head of one of the state's six districts. In 1847, it was declared the capital of Mexico when U.S. forces invaded the country. One year later, the Treaty of Guadalupe Hidalgo was signed in this city, ceding almost half of Mexico's territory and ending the war. In 1854, another treaty signed here led to the Gadsden Purchase.

In 1867, Maximilian I of Mexico was defeated at the Siege of Querétaro, where the liberals took him prisoner along with Generals Miguel Miramón and Tomás Mejía. In May 1867, the emperor was sentenced to death along with Mejía and Miramón in the Cerro de las Campanas. From 1869 to 1879, the districts were subdivided into municipalities, which the city of Querétaro as seat of both the municipality of Querétaro and the district of Querétaro. In the 20th century, the original municipality of Querétaro divided into three: Querétaro, El Marqués and Corregidora. The district system as a political entity was abolished after the Mexican Revolution, with the municipality as the base of local government. The first municipal president was Alfonso Camacho who took office in 1917. No major battles were fought here during the Mexican Revolution but various of the factions passed through here given the state's location between the northern states and Mexico City.

=== 20th century ===
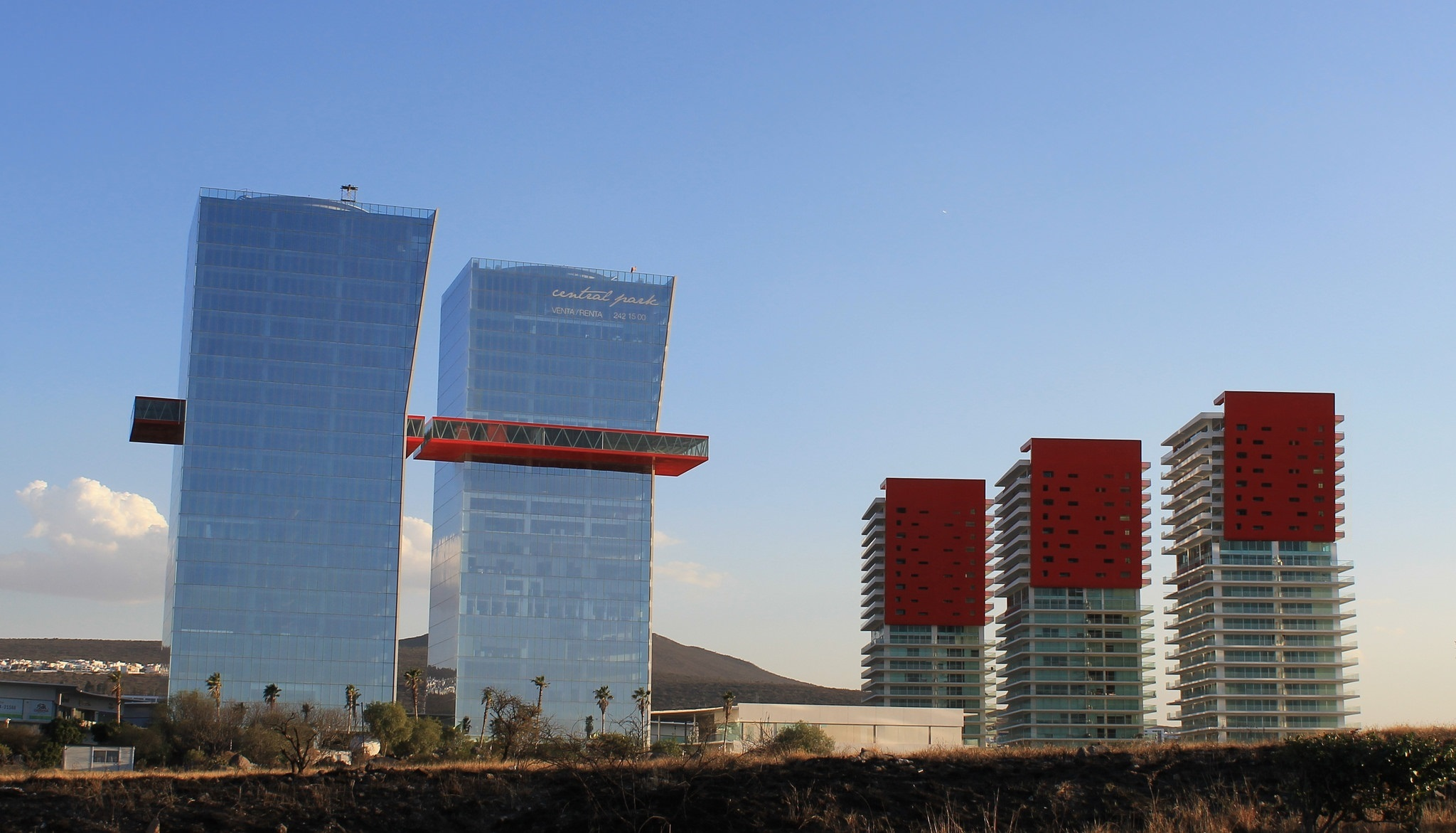
View of Center-South Querétaro city.

On 2 February 1916, the city was named the provisional capital of the country by President Venustiano Carranza on account of the Constituent Congress that was to convene there and that enacted the Political Constitution of the United Mexican States on 5 February the following year. This constitution still remains the law of the land.

On 10 September 1996, the Legislature of Querétaro amended the state constitution to restore "Santiago de Querétaro" as the capital's official name.

== Geography ==
Santiago de Querétaro is the capital and largest city of the Mexican state of Querétaro. It is located in central Mexico. It is part of the macroregion of Bajío. It is 213 kilometers (132 mi) northwest of Mexico City, 63 kilometers (39 mi) southeast of San Miguel de Allende and 200 kilometers (120 mi) south of San Luis Potosí.

The municipality has a territory of 682.7 square kilometres (263.6 sq mi) and borders three municipalities in Querétaro and one in Guanajuato.

The municipality has rolling hills, mountain ranges and flatlands. Most of the rolling hills cross the territory from south to north, paralleling the Querétaro-San Luis Potosí highway. Most plains are located in the north, and are of sedimentary soil with some protrusions of volcanic rock. Altitude varies from 1,900 to 2,460 meters above sea level with the highest elevations at mountains called El Buey, Pie de Gallo, El Patol, El Nabo, and El Paisano. The city proper is on a plain at 1,900 meters. There is only one river, the Querétaro River, which carved the La Cañada. There are numerous streams, many of them seasonal, and fresh water springs near the mountain areas. The territory contains deposits of gold, silver, manganese, tin, mercury, lead, zinc, opal, quartz, cantera stone (for building) among other minerals.

=== Climate ===
Querétaro has a semi-arid climate (Köppen climate classification BSh) with mild temperatures year round, although the average high temperature in May is 30.7 °C (87.3 °F). Most of the precipitation falls from June to August. Freezing temperatures are possible in the winter.

Climate data for Querétaro (1951-2010)
| Month | Jan | Feb | Mar | Apr | May | Jun | Jul | Aug | Sep | Oct | Nov | Dec | Year |
|---|---|---|---|---|---|---|---|---|---|---|---|---|---|
| Record high °C (°F) | 35.2 (95.4) | 31.6 (88.9) | 35.4 (95.7) | 37.0 (98.6) | 38.2 (100.8) | 37.4 (99.3) | 32.5 (90.5) | 33.0 (91.4) | 32.0 (89.6) | 32.0 (89.6) | 31.3 (88.3) | 28.6 (83.5) | 37.4 (99.3) |
| Mean daily maximum °C (°F) | 23.0 (73.4) | 24.6 (76.3) | 27.6 (81.7) | 29.5 (85.1) | 30.7 (87.3) | 29.2 (84.6) | 26.9 (80.4) | 26.8 (80.2) | 25.7 (78.3) | 25.9 (78.6) | 24.9 (76.8) | 23.5 (74.3) | 26.5 (79.7) |
| Daily mean °C (°F) | 15.1 (59.2) | 16.2 (61.2) | 18.7 (65.7) | 20.7 (69.3) | 22.5 (72.5) | 21.9 (71.4) | 20.4 (68.7) | 20.3 (68.5) | 19.5 (67.1) | 18.6 (65.5) | 16.9 (62.4) | 15.5 (59.9) | 18.9 (66.0) |
| Mean daily minimum °C (°F) | 7.1 (44.8) | 7.8 (46.0) | 9.8 (49.6) | 12.0 (53.6) | 14.3 (57.7) | 14.6 (58.3) | 13.9 (57.0) | 13.7 (56.7) | 13.3 (55.9) | 11.2 (52.2) | 8.9 (48.0) | 7.5 (45.5) | 11.2 (52.2) |
| Record low °C (°F) | −2.8 (27.0) | −1.8 (28.8) | 0.5 (32.9) | 2.6 (36.7) | 1.9 (35.4) | 4.5 (40.1) | 4.4 (39.9) | 8.6 (47.5) | 5.6 (42.1) | 1.8 (35.2) | −1.5 (29.3) | −1.5 (29.3) | −2.8 (27.0) |
| Average precipitation mm (inches) | 15.3 (0.60) | 8.8 (0.35) | 3.6 (0.14) | 15.2 (0.60) | 42.8 (1.69) | 95.4 (3.76) | 130.8 (5.15) | 84.9 (3.34) | 70.1 (2.76) | 40.4 (1.59) | 9.9 (0.39) | 10.3 (0.41) | 527.5 (20.77) |
| Average precipitation days (≥ 0.1 mm) | 2.8 | 1.8 | 0.8 | 2.4 | 6.5 | 9.7 | 11.5 | 8.5 | 7.5 | 4.9 | 2.4 | 1.9 | 60.7 |
| Average relative humidity (%) | 50 | 46 | 42 | 43 | 47 | 55 | 60 | 60 | 61 | 58 | 54 | 54 | 53 |
| Mean monthly sunshine hours | 241.8 | 237.7 | 268.4 | 264.2 | 252.1 | 208.5 | 213.8 | 225.1 | 210.7 | 235.3 | 231.5 | 213.6 | 2,802.7 |
Source 1: Servicio Meteorológico Nacional
Source 2: Colegio de Postgraduados

=== Flora and fauna ===
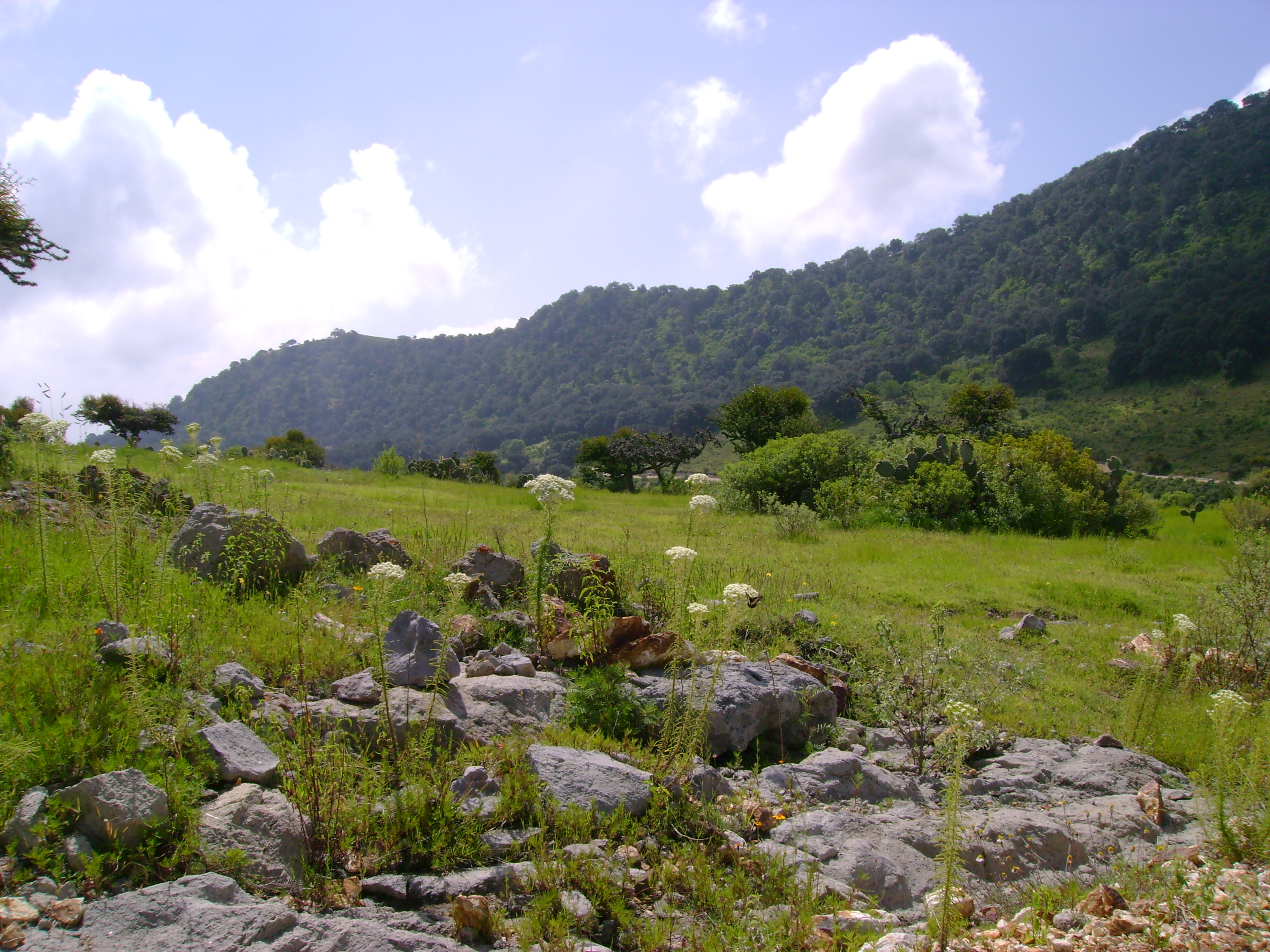
The area surrounding Querétaro is full of fields, steppes and hills.

In most areas, various species of cacti can be seen such as the organ pipe and nopals, as well as the yucca. Trees adapted to dry climates include mesquite, willows and cypress, near streams and rivers. Animal life mostly consists of small mammals, deer, predatory birds and reptiles. In some areas, monarch butterflies can be seen as well. Nature reserves in the municipality include the Peña Colorado, Tángano, Parque Ecologicao Joya-La Barreta and the El Cimatario National Park.

Near the city is the Sierra Gorda de Querétaro, part of the Sierra Madre Oriental, was declared by UNESCO as a Biosphere Reserve. This protected area is very rugged terrain, filled with canyons, steep mountains, waterfalls and deep abysses with a total expansion of 24,803 hectares. The area contains 360 species of birds, 130 species of mammals, 71 of reptiles and twenty-three of amphibians. It also contains about thirty percent of the country's butterfly species including the endangered Humboldt, the Jaguar the Oso Negro and the Guacamaya. Plant species include 1,710 different species including endangered species and is considered to be one of the best-preserved forested areas in Mexico. The Missionary Route of Friar Junípero Serra passes through here as caves such as the Sótano del Barro are located here.

== Economy ==
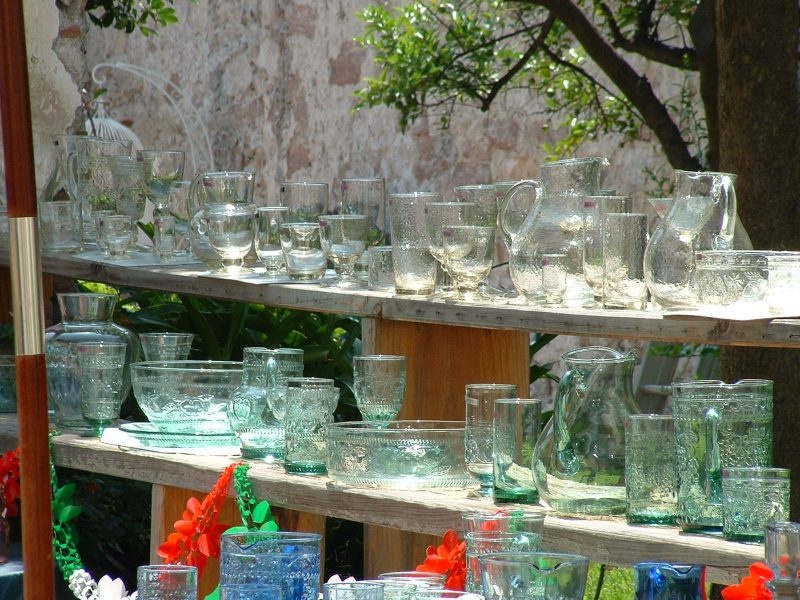
Glassworking made Querétaro an economic center in the 1700s, and glass crafting is still a trade mark of the city today.

Economic growth has been outstanding during the last decade. Today, Querétaro is a middle class city in terms of PPP GDP, with $20,000, The municipality of Querétaro was ranked 23rd in Mexico on the United Nations Index of Human Development. Querétaro debuted in 13th place in the 2006 rankings of the "Best Cities to do Business in Latin America" in América Economía, a leading economic magazine. In the 2007 rankings, it is considered the second best place in Mexico to do business, after Monterrey and the fifth best in Latin America, ahead of Miami in 6th place. The ranking takes into account variables such as telecommunications, innovation, quality of life, urban expansion, and crime statistics. In its 2007 survey entitled "Cities of the Future", FDI magazine ranked Querétaro as having the third highest cost effectiveness of all North American cities between 500,000 and two million people. In the overall classification of large cities, Querétaro was ranked sixth.

Until the 1970s, agriculture had been the overwhelming basis of the economy of the municipality outside the city and commerce within it. Since then, the expansion of industry and the growth of the city, which started in the 1950s, have diminished the importance of agriculture and the land available for it. It now only employs .01% of the municipality's population. Major employers now are the industrial parks that surround the city and extend to San Juan del Río. These include the Zona Industrial Benito Juarez, Parque Industrial Querétaro, Parque Industrial Jurica Parque La Montaña and the Querétaro-San Juan del Río Industrial Corridor. Most of the businesses operating here are foreign-owned or were built with foreign investment funds. Industries include machine and auto parts, food processing, paper products, printing, chemicals and glass.

Querétaro's economic growth is above the national average, due in part, the city believes, to the investment that it makes in infrastructure, public services and the creation of parks as well as sports and cultural facilities.

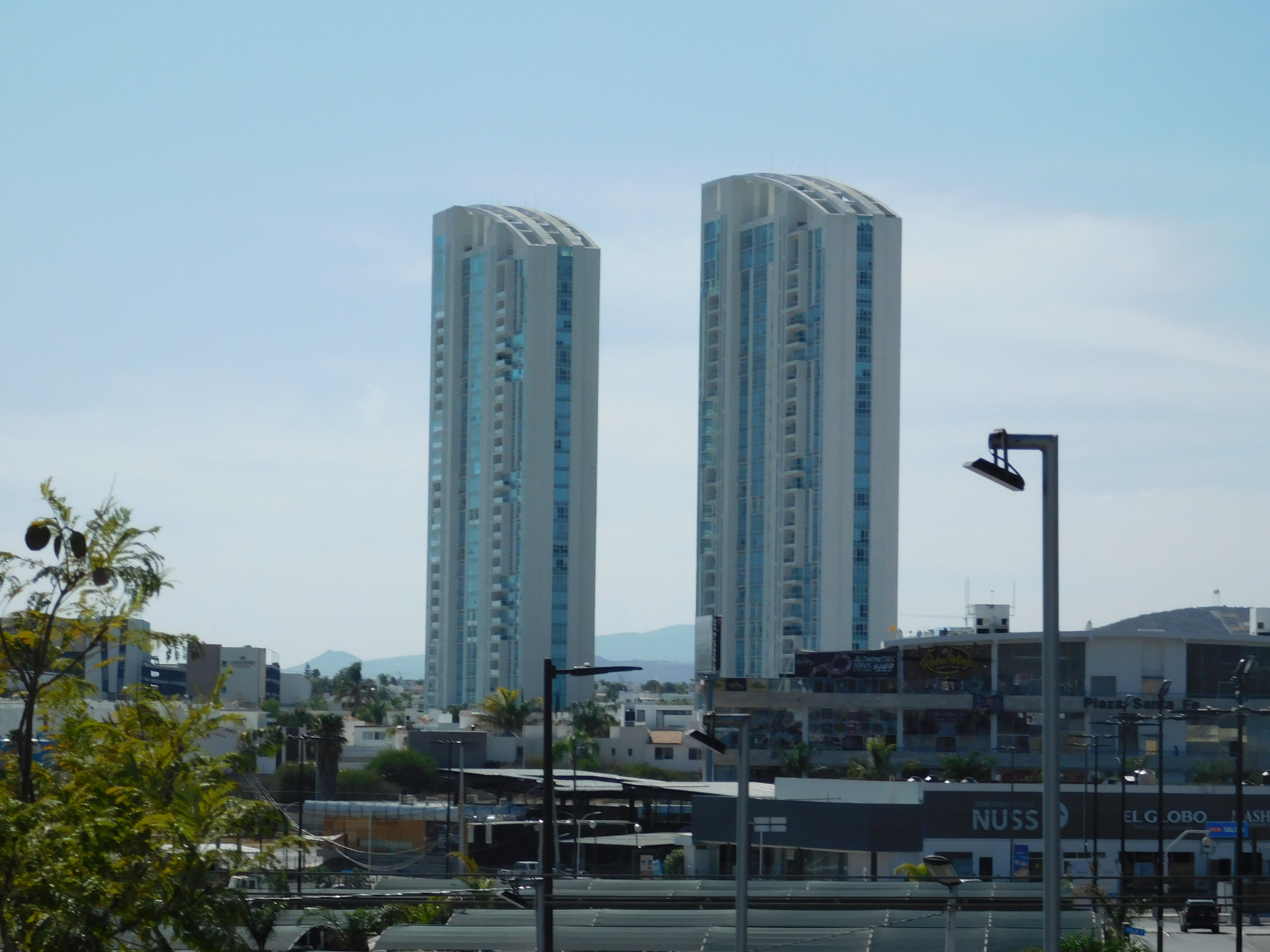
High rises at the Juriquilla district of Querétaro.

The economy spurs immigration to the city, which has seen a population growth of more than 3.5 percent a year. The industrialization of the area has attracted a large number of migrants from poorer areas of Mexico but many of these are unemployed or under-employed. This has led to an explosion of informal markets and other businesses in and around the city. Also a large number of those seeking to migrate to the northern Mexican states or to the United States pass through here. This has led to commerce being the largest economic activity in the municipality. Tourism has grown as a sector of the economy, especially in the city proper, and is now one of the most important, accounting for 21 percent of the gross product of the city. Both Standard & Poor's and the newspaper Reforma have ranked Querétaro as one of the safest cities to live in with the highest quality of life in Mexico. According to the Secretaría de Desarrollo Sustenable Municipal, the city is expected to increase in size 35 percent over the next 20 to 25 years. Economic growth for 2009 and 2010 was predicted to be between one and two percent due to the worldwide economic downturn. Especially changes like the deconcentration of the economic activities (industry and service) and the emergence of a housing market lead to significant growth in cities like Querétaro. Major corporations headquartered in Querétaro include Bombardier Aerospace (an airplane manufacturing facility in Mexico), Kellogg's, Samsung Electronics, Daewoo, and Colgate-Palmolive. Harman International Industries, General Electric, Michelin, Tetra Pak, Siemens Mexico, New Holland, Faurecia, ABC Group, Autoliv, TRW Automotive, Tremec, Valeo, Funai, Procter & Gamble, Nestlé, Pilgrim's Pride, Santander Bank's call center for Latin America, Mabe Mexico, Irizar, Scania, Hitachi, Kostal, Aernnova, Dana, Dow Chemical, Bose, Alpha Hilex, Saint-Gobain, Flex-N-Gate, ThyssenKrupp, and TCS.

== Festival of Santiago de Querétaro ==
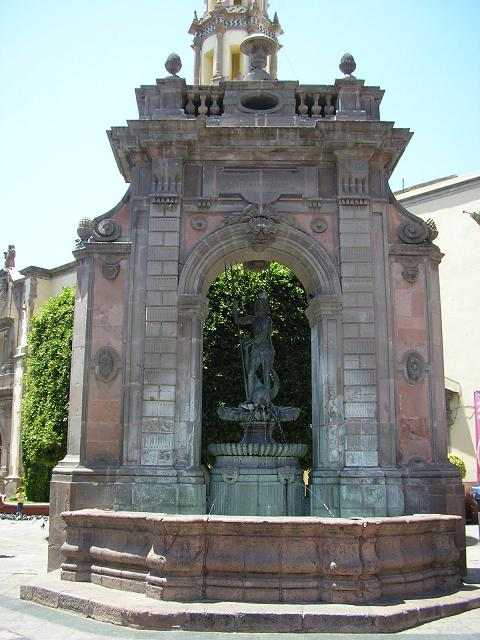
The Neptune fountain, a symbol of the city

The Festival of Santiago de Querétaro is an annual arts and cultural event that takes place in the city for eight days during Holy Week. It is sponsored by the city of Querétaro along with CONACULTA and the Secretary of Tourism for the state of Querétaro. Each year the event has a theme, which was being "Arte in Todos los Sentidos" (Art in All Senses) in 2009. The events are held in various locations, such as the City Museum, the Guerrero Garden, the Zenea Garden and the Rosalio Solano Theatre as well as the various plazas around the city center. The festival is held during Holy Week holiday to attract Mexican and international visitors to the city. The event starts with an inaugural parade through the streets of the historic center, starting from Corregidora Street to Constituyentes, Angela Peralta, Juárez, Madera, and Guerrero streets. The parade ends at the site where public officials open the event.

Over the eight days, both Mexican and international artists perform and exhibit their work. Events include music, painting, dance, photography, literature, special workshops and a children's pavilion. One final day, there is a culinary event were visitors can sample regional cuisine from restaurants of the city. The 2009 event has 110 events and with an expected attendance of about 3,150,000 people in total, far exceeding the 260,000 who attended in 2008. The 2009 event had concerts featuring traditional Mexican music, rock and jazz. Some of the international artists came from Italy, Argentina, and Brazil. Featured Mexican artists included Pindekuechua, a traditional music group from Morelia, Grupo Esparza from Guanajuato and Jazzcorps from Toluca.

== Metropolitan area ==
According to the latest definitions by the National Population Council (CONAPO), the Metropolitan Area of Querétaro spans over an area of 2,427.3 square kilometres (937.2 sq mi), comprising the municipalities of Querétaro, Corregidora, El Marqués and Huimilpan in the state of Querétaro, and Apaseo el Alto in the state of Guanajuato. With a total population of 1,594,212 in 2020, it is the 8th largest metro area in Mexico, as well as the 128th largest in the largest metropolitan areas in the Americas.

The metropolitan area of Querétaro has seen a high population growth since the second half of the 1990s, making it the second fastest-growing in the country, just behind Cancún. The municipality of El Marqués has the highest rate of population growth in the state, after almost doubling its population in the last ten years. Most of the population growth is due to migration with people relocating from Mexico City, State of Mexico, Guanajuato, Michoacán and Veracruz. It is estimated that in 2005 alone, 10,465 people migrated to the metropolitan area.

Due to factors as diverse as education, economy, security, and quality of life, migration flows from the north and center of the country to the city of Santiago de Querétaro have been noticeable in the recent years. Especially the cities' high security reason also attracts people from other countries like Venezuela, Colombia, Brazil, Spain and many others. Due to the high number of migrants, the municipality is currently considering implementing the Institute for Migrant Assistance to make migration more visible and hence increase structure, legality and safety.

Querétaro is among the top five most competitive metropolitan areas in Mexico.

In January 2008, the government of the border municipality of Apaseo el Alto in the state of Guanajuato announced the construction of an urbanization for 120,000 inhabitants, which will be part of the metropolitan area of Santiago de Querétaro.

| Municipality | State | Type | Area (km^{2}) | 2020 census | 2010 census | Change |
|---|---|---|---|---|---|---|
| Querétaro | Querétaro | Core | 682.7 | 1,049,777 | 801,940 | +30.90% |
| Corregidora | Querétaro | Core | 234.9 | 212,567 | 143,073 | +48.57% |
| El Marqués | Querétaro | Core | 747.6 | 231,668 | 116,458 | +98.93% |
| Huimilpan | Querétaro | Peripheral | 388.1 | 36,808 | 35,554 | +3.53% |
| Apaseo el Alto | Guanajuato | Peripheral | 373.9 | 63,392 | 64,433 | −1.62% |
| Total | | | 2,427.3 | 1,594,212 | 1,161,458 | +37.26% |

== Transportation ==
=== Air ===
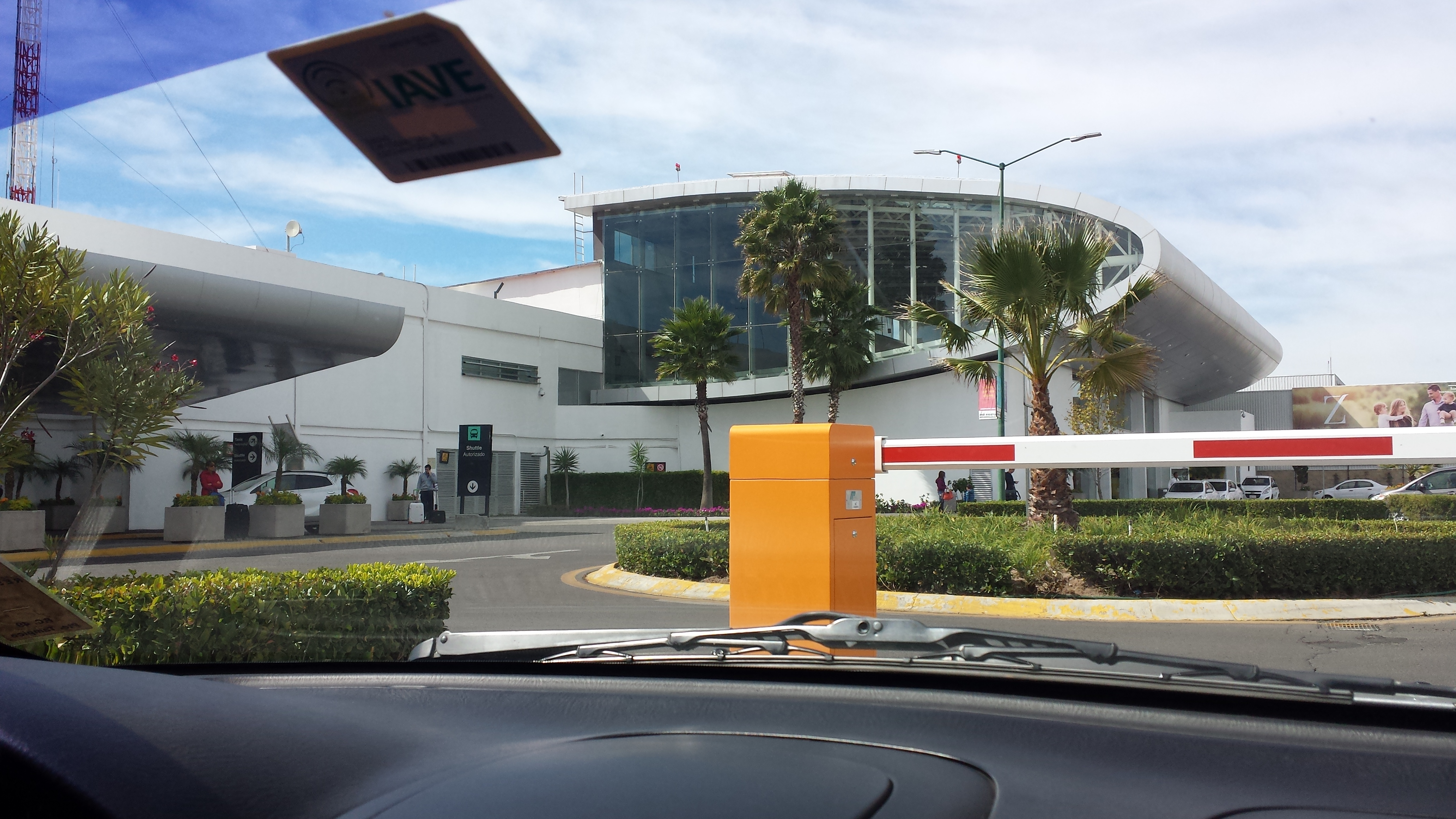
Querétaro Intercontinental Airport

Querétaro Intercontinental Airport (QRO) began operations in 2004, replacing the old Ing. Fernando Espinoza Gutiérrez International Airport in the city. The airport handles passengers and freight of both transport and private airplanes, and in recent years became of the fastest growing airports in Mexico in terms of passengers. It serves as the hub for the regional airline TAR Aerolíneas. Plans to convert the old airport into an international one began in 1999, after studies indicated the need for such. Construction of infrastructure began in 2002.

=== Roads ===
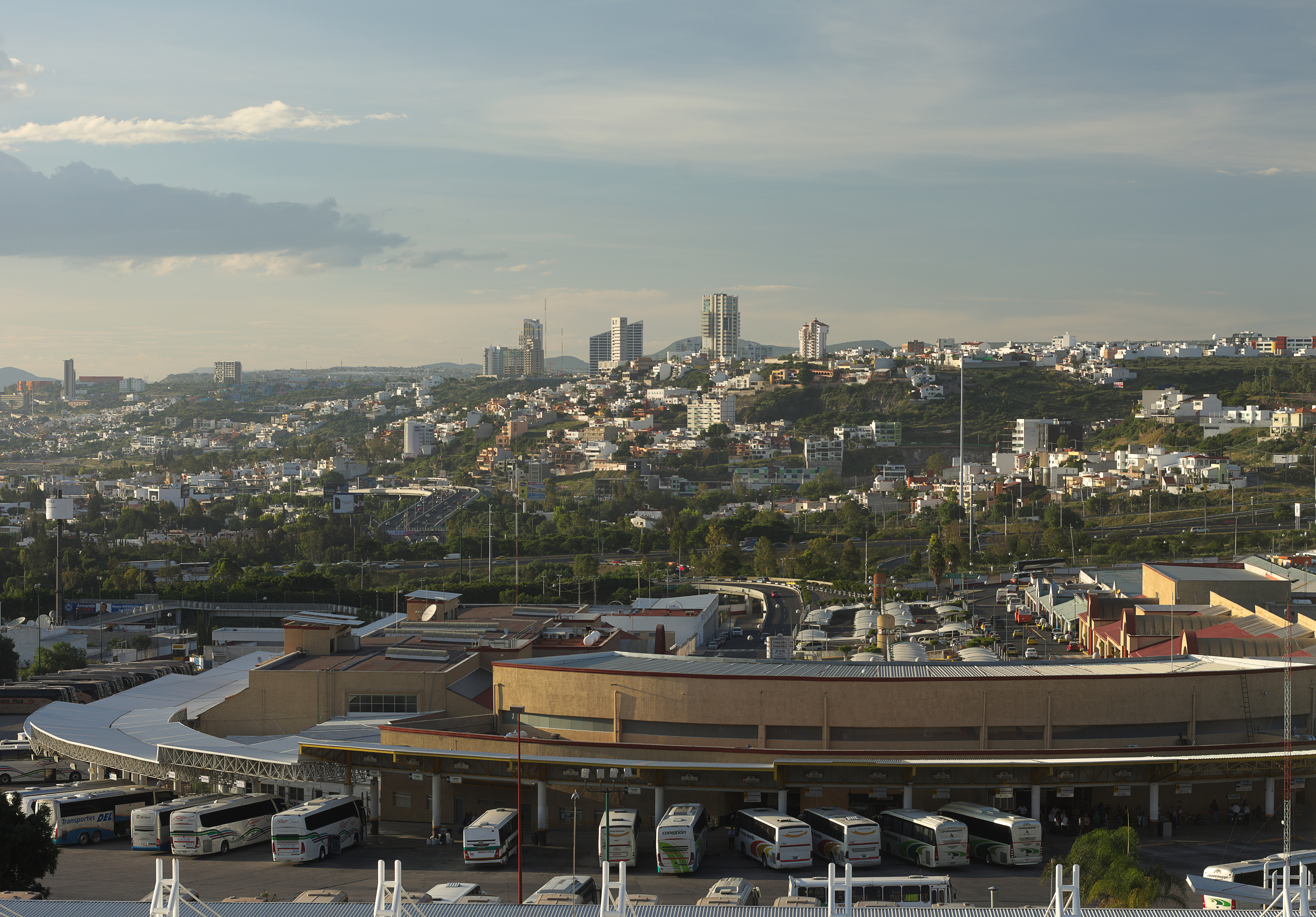
Querétaro's main Bus Terminal and surrounding highways.

Querétaro is the crossroads of Mexico. Federal Highway 57, which runs from Mexico City to Piedras Negras, Coahuila, crosses Querétaro. Federal Highway 45 leaves Querétaro westbound, towards Guanajuato. The part of Federal Highway 57 that crosses the city is called Blvd. Bernardo Quintana, and this is the main road of the city, stretching from its southernmost part near City Hall, to the new industrial areas northwest of downtown. Federal Highway 45 crosses the city, south of downtown. Cinco de Febrero Ave joins them in a north–south route. The three of them form a sort of ring road around downtown. The railway line that connects Mexico City with western Mexico bisects the city.

The Libramiento Sur-Poniente is a new ring road under construction, though parts of it already exist. When completed, it will join Bernardo Quintana on its southeastern part, go around the city in its southwestern and western parts, and reach the northern suburb of Santa Rosa Jauregui. Currently, there is work in progress that aims to extend Bernardo Quintana on its northwestern end to this ring road.

Another freeway, named after missionary Junípero Serra who founded the Missions of the Sierra Gorda, creates another ring road. It goes from northeast Querétaro around the old airport, reaches the northern suburb of Juriquilla and goes southwards down to the Libramiento Sur-Poniente.

=== Public transport ===
QroBus is the city's public transport and BRT system

Querétaro's public transport system is operated by the state government and is known as QroBus. There are also conventional taxis. The city also has a large inter-city bus terminal.

QroBus also operates the city's bus rapid transit (BRT) system. Service launched in the late 2010s and has since expanded to sixteen routes.

=== Rail ===
Site of the future La Corregidora station

In 2027, two new railway stations will open to serve Querétaro: La Corregidora near the historic center and El Marqués near the airport. La Corregidora will be the terminus of two new passenger rail services, Tren México (Buenavista)–Querétaro and Tren Querétaro–Irapuato, both expected to open in 2027. By 2028, it will also be the terminus of the new Tren Querétaro–San Luis Potosí. The route to Mexico City will be considered the third new Tren Interurbano service.

These new rail services will be the first segments of a larger plan to build passenger rail connecting Mexico City with Nuevo Laredo and Nogales at the United States border, passing through other major cities such as Guadalajara, Monterrey, León, and Saltillo.

== Education and research ==
The city and its surroundings are home to some of the most important universities in Mexico. The most prestigious universities in Mexico, the National Autonomous University of Mexico, the Universidad Anáhuac and the ITESM (Instituto Tecnológico y de Estudios Superiores de Monterrey), have set campuses at the outskirts where significant research is carried out. UNAM is a public institution and the Universidad Anáhuac and the ITESM-Querétaro are private.

- The Universidad Autónoma de Querétaro (founded in 1625 as the College of St. Ignatius of Loyola. It is the largest and most important university in the state. It ranked fifth in the Times Higher Education magazine's "Top universities in Mexico 2024")
- Instituto Tecnológico de Querétaro
- Universidad del Valle de México
- Universidad Anáhuac
- Universidad Contemporánea
- Universidad TecMilenio, Campus Querétaro
- Universidad del Golfo de México, Campus Querétaro
- Universidad Politecnica de Querétaro
- Universidad Cuauhtémoc
- Universidad Univer-Aliat
- Escuela Bancaria y Comercial
- Universidad Corregidora de Querétaro
- Universidad Veracruzana
- Universidad del Valle de Atemajac
- Universidad Marista
- Escuela Normal del Estado
- Centro de Estudios Universitarios Londres
- Universidad Liceo
- Universidad Tecnológica de Querétaro Archived 2013-05-21 at the Wayback Machine
- Universidad Nacional Aeronáutica en Querétaro
- Instituto Gastronómico y de Estudios Superiores
- Centro de Estudios en Ciencias de la Comunicación
- Centro de Formación de Recursos de Enfermería de Querétaro
- Instituto Tecnológico de la Construcción
- Centro de Estudios Odontológicos
- Centro Universitario Andamaxei
- Centro de Estudios Superiores del Bajio
- Universidad Interamericana del Norte
- Colegio Universitario De Humanidades
- Universidad Metropolitana Latina
- Centro de Estudios de Posgrado en Salud Mental
- Universidad CNCI
- Colegio Universitario de Formación Empresarial, Querétaro
- Universidad Internacional de Querétaro
- Centro de Investigación en Ciencia Applicada y Tecnología avanzada (part of the IPN)
- CUDH

The city is also home to more than seven research centers. Among the most important are CIATEQ, CIDESI and CIDETEQ. There are also several private research centers.

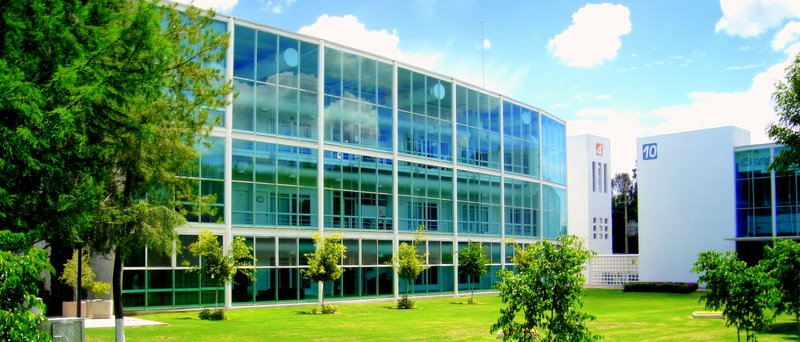
ITESM (Tec de Monterrey), Querétaro campus.

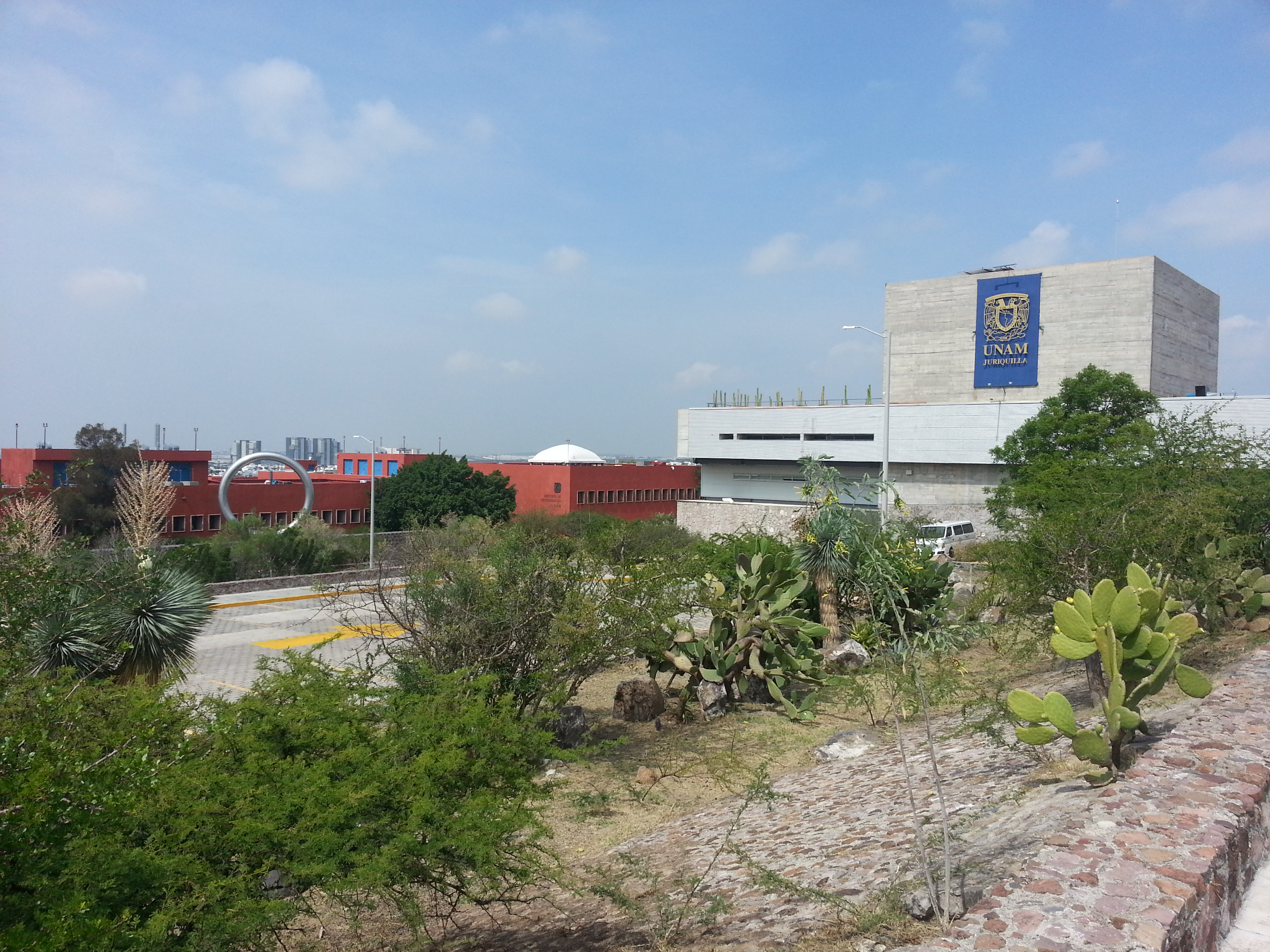
UNAM, Juriquilla campus

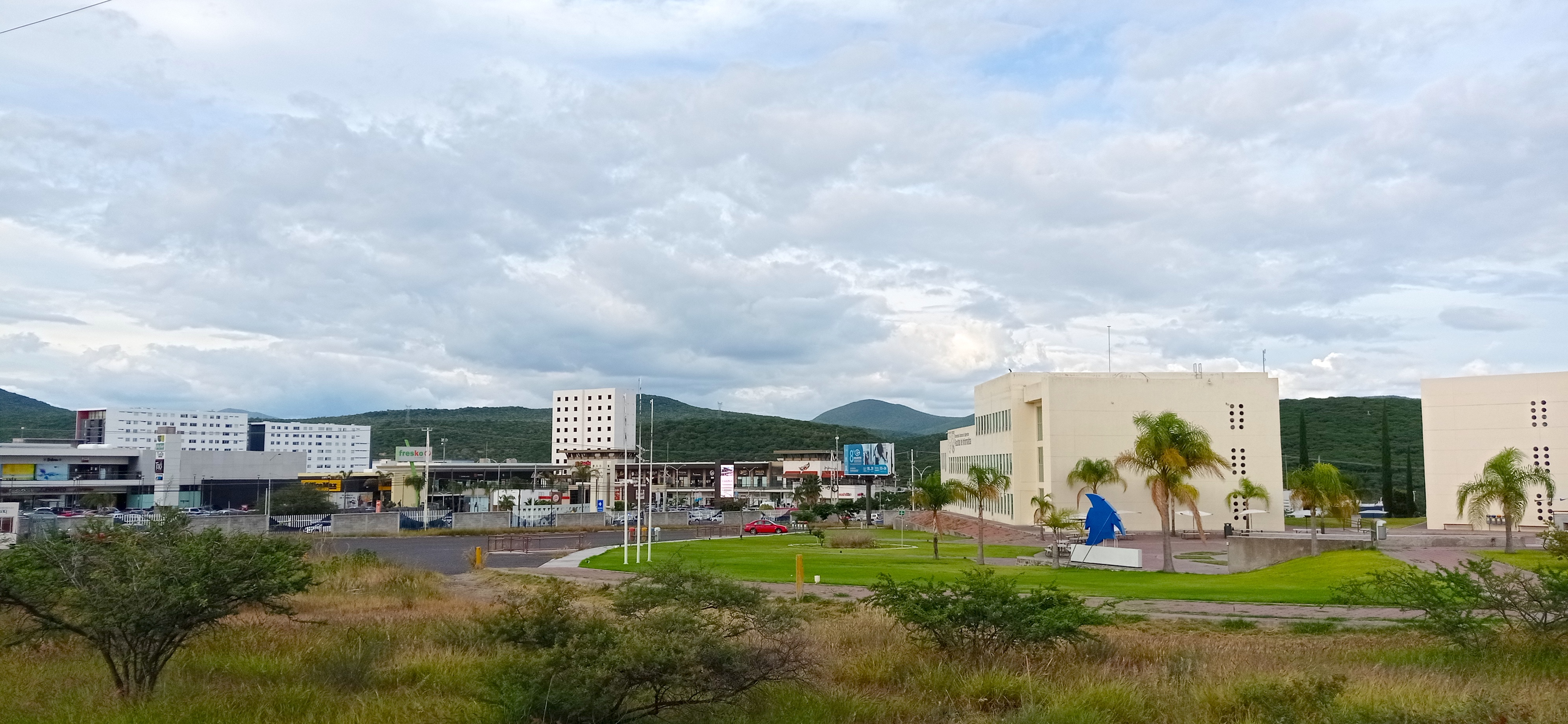
Autonomous University of Querétaro (UAQ).

== Sports ==
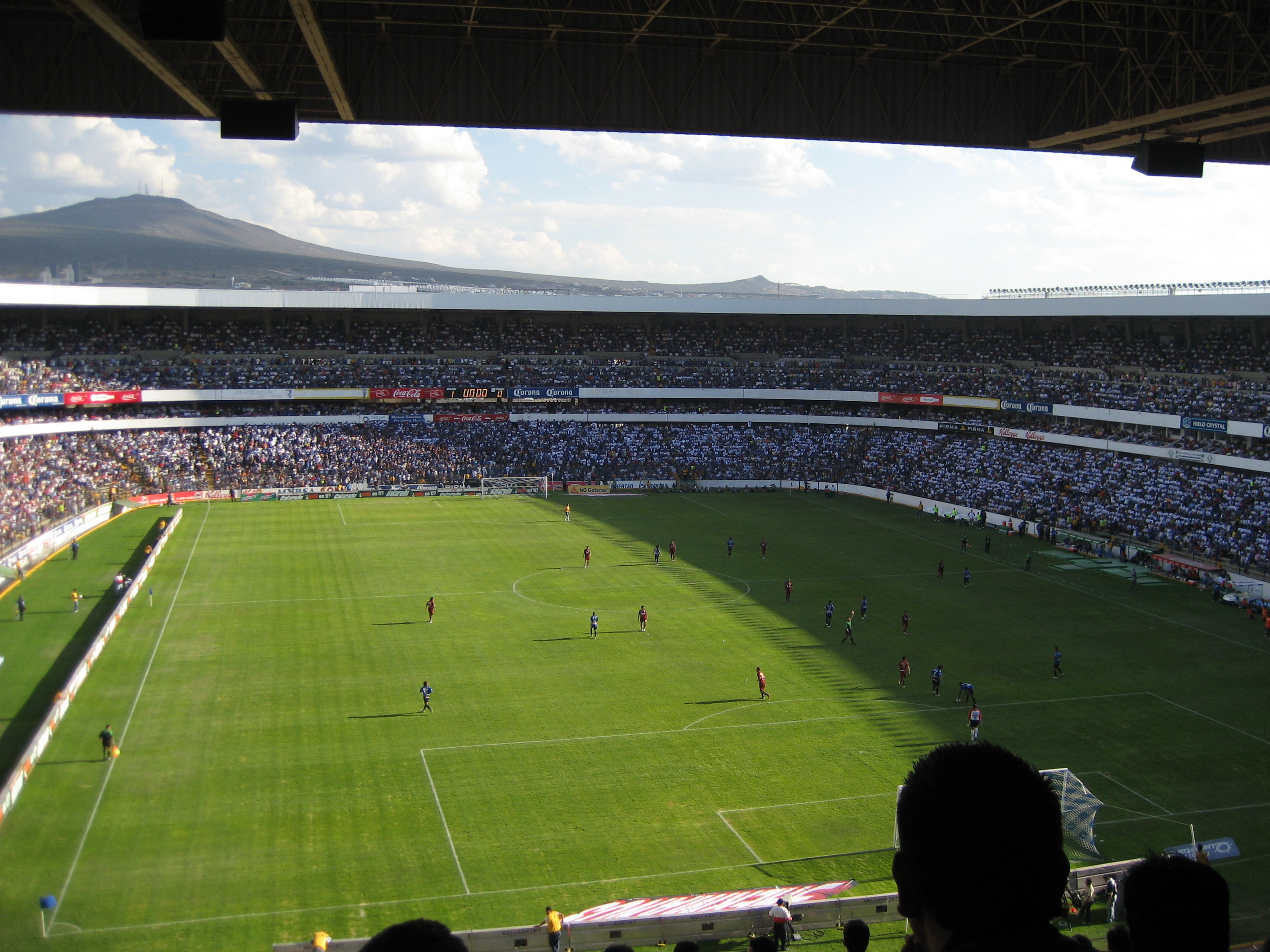
Interior of the Estadio Corregidora.

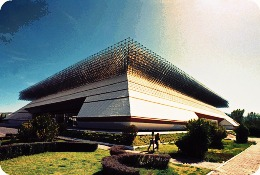
Josefa Auditorium

The city has one of the most modern stadiums in Mexico, the Estadio Corregidora, built for the FIFA World Cup held in 1986. Querétaro F.C. of the Liga MX plays there. One of the most popular sports in the city is bullfighting. There are two bullrings, Santa María, and Juriquilla. Santa María was inaugurated on December 22, 1963, and it has a capacity for 13,000 spectators. Juriquilla is much smaller but considered the most beautiful bullring in the country.

The Conspiradores de Querétaro, founded in 2024, play in the Mexican Baseball League at the Estadio Finsus in nearby Huimilpan.

Another popular sport is American Football which is played in different institutions (UAQ [Gatos Salvajes], ITQ [Zorros] & ITESM [Borregos Salvajes]), Querétaro has two college football teams, the Zorros of ITQ (ONEFA) and Borregos Salvajes ITESM campus Querétaro (CONADEIP).

Golf is also quite popular, with numerous courses including: Juriquilla, Campestre, Balvanera, and El Campanario. San Gil and Tequisquiapan are located near the city itself. There are two wrestling or Lucha Libre Arenas in the city, the Arena Querétaro that has matches from the Consejo Mundial de Lucha Libre, the Desastre Total Ultraviolento, and the Auditorio Arteaga a multipurpose venue that hosts Libertadores de Querétaro basketball and AAA fights.

The Auditorio Arteaga also serves as Basketball stadium for the city team Libertadores and for traditional wrestling, volleyball and other sports. This venue has a capacity of 3000 people seated. The Auditorio Josefa Ortiz is the largest multipurpose venue in the city, it serve for tennis matches (Davis Cup), Tae Kwon Do, Table Tennis, and other sports, it has a capacity of 6000 seated in stadium formation.

Other sport facilities in the city include:

- Parque Querétaro 2000: Olympic pool, Tae Kwon Doo arena, gymnasium, Football field, Baseball field, Volleyball, Running Path, among other.
- Parque Alfalfares: Basketball courses, Tennis courses, Semi Olympic Pool, Football field (Association and American), Baseball and Volleyball
- Estadio Municipal: Football stadium with capacity for 1000 people seated.
- Unidad Deportiva UAQ: state university sports unit, open to the public.
- Unidad Deportiva IMSS: health care system sports unit, for special events and open to the public and workers of IMSS

== The municipality ==
As municipal seat, the city of Querétaro is the governing authority for 132 communities in the municipality, divided into seven delegations.

The total population of the municipality in 2020 is 1,049,777, the 12th most populated in Mexico. 794,789 people (75%) live in the city of Santiago de Querétaro proper. Other major cities in the municipality are Juriquilla (39,244), San Pedro Mártir (31,677), San José el Alto (29,758) and Santa Rosa Jáuregui (22,168).

Boroughs/Delegaciones

=== Boroughs ===
The municipality of Querétaro is divided into seven boroughs, called delegaciones:

- Centro Histórico: it includes downtown and nearby areas, it is surrounded by the city's main thoroughfares (Blvd. Bernardo Quintana, 5 de Febrero Ave. and the Mexico City–Querétaro Highway). Most of the city's monuments are located here, including the UNESCO World Heritage Site designated areas, and the Cerro de las Campanas where Emperor Maximilian of Habsburg was executed. The northwestern corner is home to industrial establishments, mainly food related (Gerber, Nestlé, Pilgrim's Pride).
- Santa Rosa Jáuregui: it consists mainly of rural areas, where the production of eggs, poultry and livestock are important. However, the borough includes larger towns such as Santa Rosa Jáuregui and Juriquilla. It is home to the largest water reservoir in the municipality, the Presa de Santa Catarina. A relatively new state of the art industrial park has been built here (Samsung).
- Felix Osores Sotomayor: most of the recent growth in the city has taken place here, the population growth rate estimated at 6%. The largest industrial area of Querétaro is located here, where many multinational companies have operations (Michelin, Philips). The beautiful neighborhood of Jurica is located in this borough.
- Epigmenio González: a mostly residential zone on hilly terrain. The former airport will become the third campus of the Universidad Autónoma de Querétaro. (pop. 125,000; area 68 km^{2})
- Josefa Vergara y Hernández: on the slopes of the Cerro del Cimatario, its easternmost area is known as Centro Sur, where the Stadium, Bus Station and City Hall are located. (pop. 200,000; area 33 km^{2})
- Felipe Carrillo Puerto: the western part consists mainly of rural areas, where the town of Tlacote is located, famous for its allegedly miraculous water springs. The eastern area is urban and integrated with the rest of the city, with industrial zones (Kellogg's) and military facilities.
- Cayetano Rubio: residential area, it includes the town of Hercules, a village-like area, nestled between steep slopes along the riverway of the Río Querétaro.

The mayor of each borough, called delegado, is appointed by the mayor of the city, although there have been attempts to make these posts popularly elected.

== UNESCO World Heritage Site ==
In 1996, the historic center of Querétaro was declared a World Heritage Site in 2009 and as a "Design City" by UNESCO in 2017. According to UNESCO's website, the "old colonial town of Querétaro is unusual in having retained the geometric street plan of the Spanish conquerors side by side with the twisting alleys of the Otomi quarters. The Otomi, the Tarasco, the Chichimeca and the Spanish lived together peacefully in the town with similar standards of living, a rare occurrence at a time when the Indigenous and Hispanic were usually separated by a large income gap and at odds with one another in other parts of the nation.

This peace and similarity of social integration is largely attributed to the fact that the local Indigenous ethnicities and Spanish reached peace early after contact and both functioned concurrently with the Indigenous retaining their own economic and social systems while the Criollos operated in a separate but integrated society within the city. The city is notable for the many ornate civil and religious Baroque monuments from its golden age in the 17th and 18th centuries" In 2008, National Geographic Traveler listed Querétaro as one of the top 15 historic destinations of the world.

== Notable sites ==
The most prominent feature of the city is the enormous aqueduct of Querétaro, consisting of seventy-four arches, each twenty meters wide with a total extension of 1,280 meters and an average height of 23 meters. It was built by the Marquis Juan Antonio de Urrutia y Arana between 1726 and 1738 at the request of the nuns of the Santa Clara Convent to bring water to the residents of the city from La Cañada.

Most of the rest of Querétaro's notable sites are located in the historic center, which is pedestrian-friendly and filled with colonial architecture. The local government maintains this area well, with cleaning crews to keep the streets clean and regulating vendors so that they do not block streets and sidewalks. In the evening, the area fills with people strolling the plazas and walkways and frequenting the area's restaurants, cafes and food stands. One way to see this part of town is the Noche de Leyendas (Night of Legends), which is a hybrid between interactive theater and a recounting of history. A group of actors guide visitors through the streets of the city narrating stories about what has happened in these places. This event begins at the main plaza, the Plaza de Armas in the center of the city with a reenactment of the legend of Carambada. Then the show wanders the street all the while telling tales related to bandits, loves and myths. These tales demand audience participation providing lines and provoking debate.

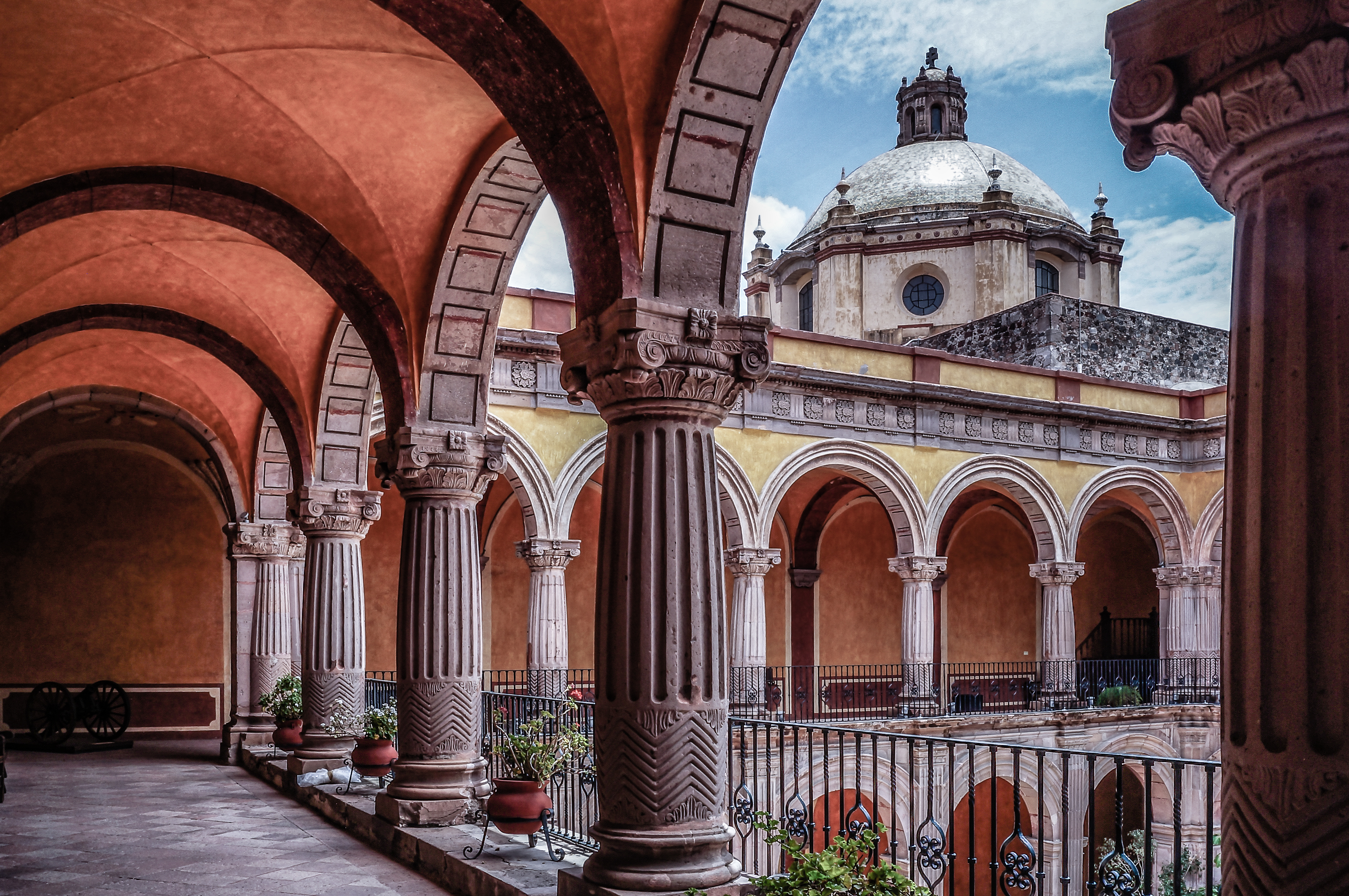
Church and ex-Convent of San Francisco de Asís de Querétaro

In the center of downtown is the San Francisco Church, finished at the beginning of the 18th century and from then on the most important in town, serving as the cathedral until the 20th century. It and the attached cloister is all that is left of a large complex that included several chapels and an orchard that extended for blocks to the east and south. On the facade, there is a depicting of Saint James fighting the Moors, cutting the head off of one. The main altar is Neoclassic, and replaced what reputedly was a masterpiece of Baroque design. This has happened frequently in the city; those Baroque altars not plundered over the course of Mexican history were replaced by newer designs. Older Baroque side altarpieces are still here, and are covered in gold leaf. Other notable pieces here include a large Baroque music stand and the seating of the choir section both done by architect Francisco Eduardo Tresguerras of Celaya in the 18th century. There are also sculptures done by Mariano Montenegro and Mariano Arce.

The church's cloister is now the Regional Museum of Querétaro. Built between 1660 and 1698, the monastery it houses was the first in the city, built by Franciscans to evangelize the native populations here. The architecture is representative of Franciscan style, with simple lines and decoration. The museum exhibits artifacts from the pre-Hispanic, colonial and post-Independence eras of this region's history. The Plaza de la Constitución and Jardin Zenea plaza (named after liberal governor Benito Zenea) were part of the atrium of the church and monastery. This area is crowded every night and all day on Sunday, when the municipal band plays dance music from the 1940s to the 1960s.

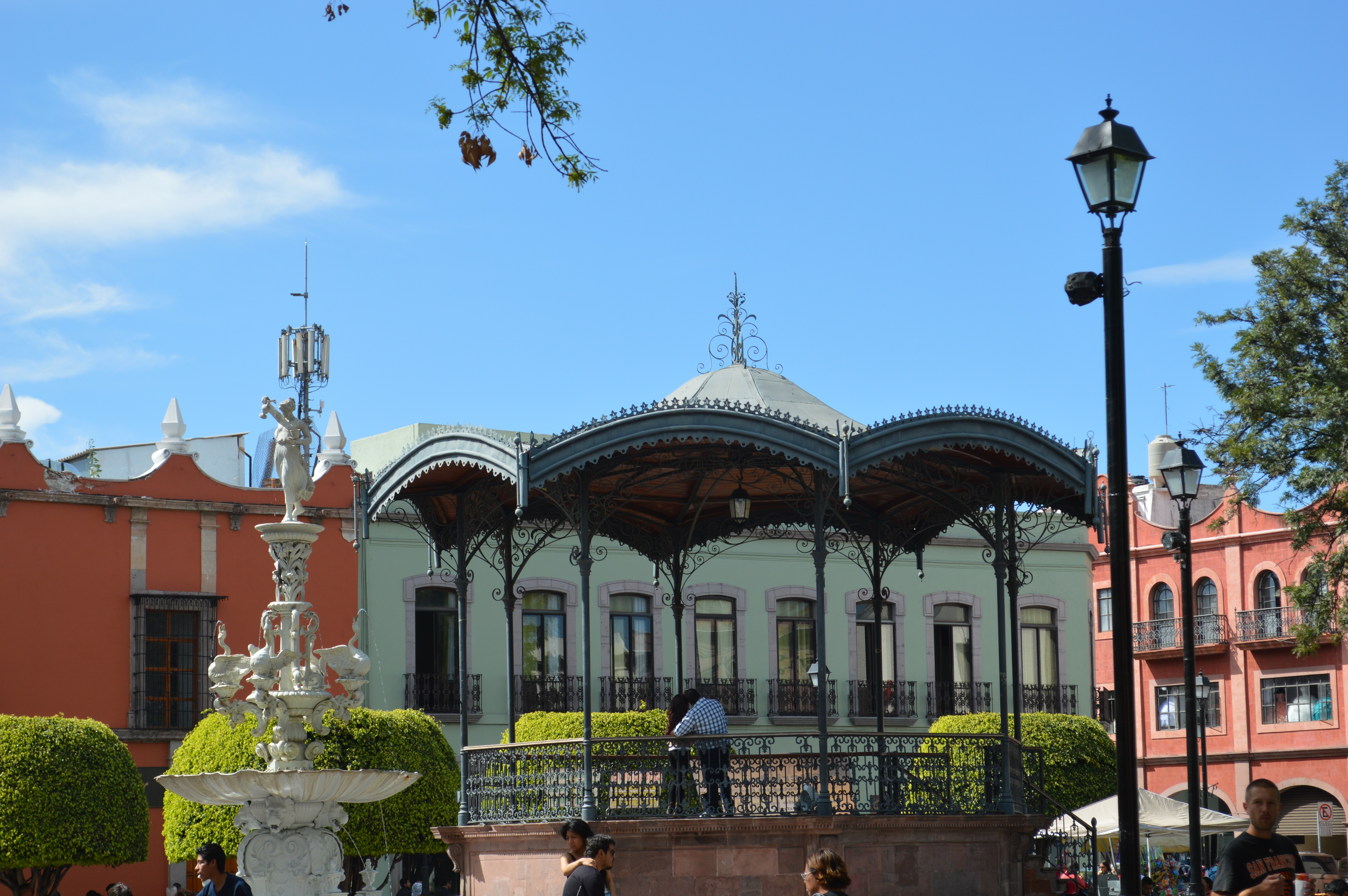
Kiosk in the Jardin Zenea

The Independence Plaza is the oldest part of the city, and is filled with Indian laurel trees, surrounded by outdoor restaurants and colonial mansions. Streets here are made of cobblestone and have names such as La Calle de Bimbo and the Callejón del Ciego. In the middle of this plaza is a fountain that honors Juan Antonio de Urrutia y Arana, who built that large aqueduct to bring water to the city. Around the plaza is the Galeria Libertad (Libertad Gallery) and the Casa de Ecala (Ecala House), which is a baronial mansion from the 18th century with large balconies and wrought ironwork. However, the best-known structure on this plaza is the Palacio de la Corregiadora.

The Casa de la Corregidora was originally called the Casas Reales y Cárceles (Royal Houses and Jails). Today it houses the government of the state of Querétaro. Its name comes from its most famous occupant, Josefa Ortiz de Domínguez, who was the wife of the mayor or corregidor of the city. Ortiz de Domínguez is a heroine of the Mexican War of Independence and the Conspiracy of 1810 that led to the start of the war which occurred here. Her final resting place is the Mausoleum of the Corregidora.

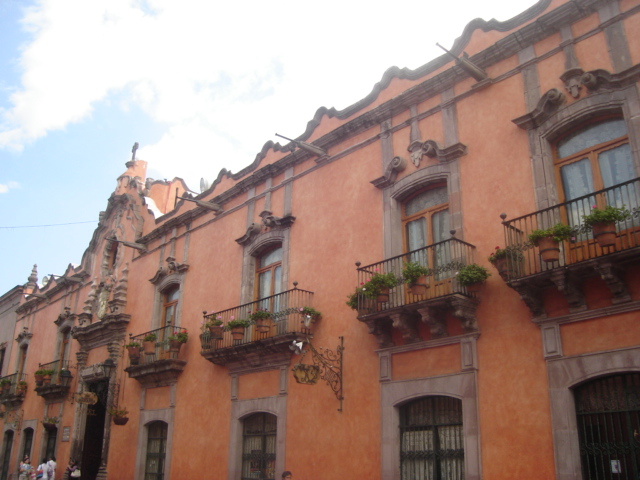
The Casa de la Marquesa hosted the Foreign Secretary when Querétaro was the Mexican capital.

The Querétaro Cathedral was built between 1786 and 1805. It was opened and blessed by Miguel Hidalgo y Costilla, who also officiated the first Mass. In 1921, this church was declared the Cathedral of Querétaro by Pope Benedict XV. The church is constructed of tezontle and has altarpieces of cantera stone. The facade shows the transition between Baroque and Neoclassical architecture, and is considered to be the last Baroque facade in the city. Inside the nave is sober, austere and completely Neoclassical. The old monastery complex now houses the Ministry of Urban Development and Public Works. It is more commonly referred to as the Palace of Conín.

The Church of Santa Rosa de Viterbo is attributed to Alarife Ignacio Maraiano de las Casas and financed by José Velasquez de Lorea, finished in 1752. The church has twin entrances, which was common with convent churches. The two arches are decorated with mocking faces put there by Casas to those who did not think he could manage the building of the institution. The outside is flanked by scroll-shaped flying buttresses, which only serve as decoration and are unique to Querétaro. The tower has a unique shape and is topped with a pyramid-shaped crest. There is an inner doorway decorated in Churrigueresque style and an image of Saint Rose. Inside, the most outstanding feature is the pulpit inlaid with ivory, nacre, turtle shell and silver, and its altarpieces are gold covered in Querétaro Baroque style. The entrance to the sacristy contains paintings of José Velazquez de Lore and Sor Ana María de San Francisco y Neve. The convent complex was later amplified by Juan Caballero y Osio. The nuns began to dedicate themselves to primary education and by 1727 it became the Royal College of Santa Rosa. The convent was closed in 1861 due to the Reform Laws and was subsequently used as a hospital for about 100 years. Today the convent portion is home to the Centro de Estudios de Diseño y Artes Graficas Mexico-Italiano.

The Church of Santa Cruz is on Sangremal Hill, where the appearance of Saint James is said to have occurred at the founding of the city and the cross commemorating the event is kept. Both the church and the monastery are Franciscan, and in one of the few monasteries to be in operation in Mexico. This was also the site of the Colegio de la Propagación de la Fe, the first missionary school established in the Americas. From here, missionaries such as Junípero Serra set out on foot, as required by the Order, to establish missions as far away as Texas and California. During the early War of Independence, Miguel Domínguez, Querétaro's mayor and part of the 1810 Conspiracy was imprisoned here. The church has been completely restored and its main attraction is the pink stone cross that was placed on this hill in the 16th century. Its altarpieces are also of pink stone and are a mix of Baroque and Neoclassical. Tours are available here and feature how the aqueduct brought water here to cisterns, from which the residents of the city would fill their buckets. There is also a thorn tree said to have grown from the walking stick of Friar Antonio Margil de Jesús, and is considered miraculous as the thorns grow in the shape of a cross.

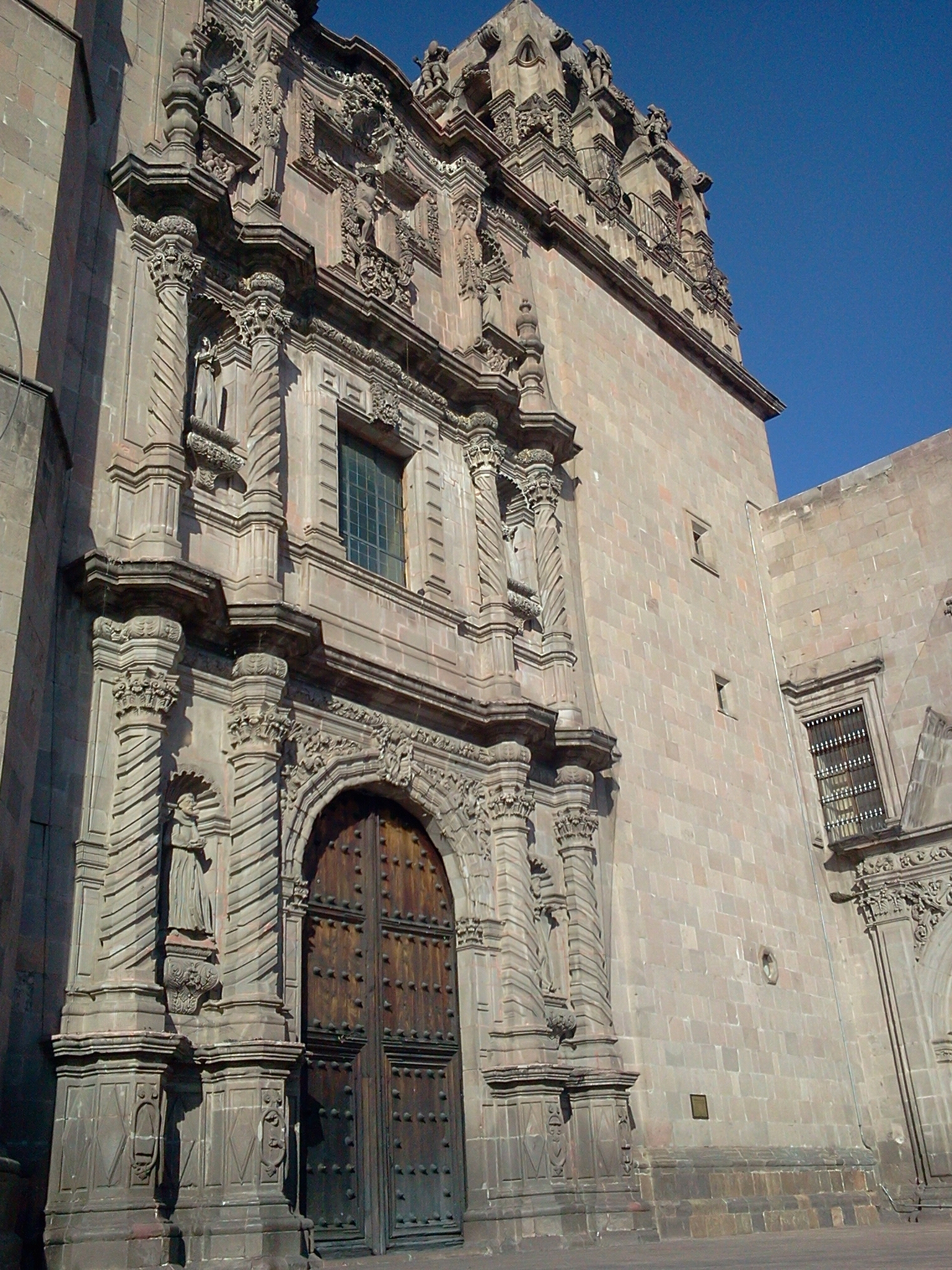
Courtyard of the Museum of Art.

The Art Museum of Querétaro is located in the former monastery of San Agustín. The building is considered one of the major Baroque works of art in Mexico, built in the 18th century and is attributed to Ignacio Mariano de la Casa. It has a facade of cantera stone in which an image of a crucified Christ is surrounded by grapevines. The niches around the main portal contain images of Saint Joseph, Our Lady of Sorrows, Saint Monica and others. Its cupola contains life-sized images of angels, but its bell tower was never finished. The monastery was occupied by Augustine friars starting in 1743 and is considered to be one of the finest Baroque monasteries in the Americas. Its fame as such comes from the decoration of the arches and columns that surround the inner courtyard. On the ground floor, there are faces with fierce expressions, while those on the upper floor have more serene expressions. Surrounding both sets of faces are chains linking the images. The museum contains one of the most important collections of colonial-era art and is organized by painting style. Some European works are here but the focus is on the painters of New Spain, including some of the most famous. The museum also sponsors temporary exhibits, theatrical works, as well as literary, photography and musical events.

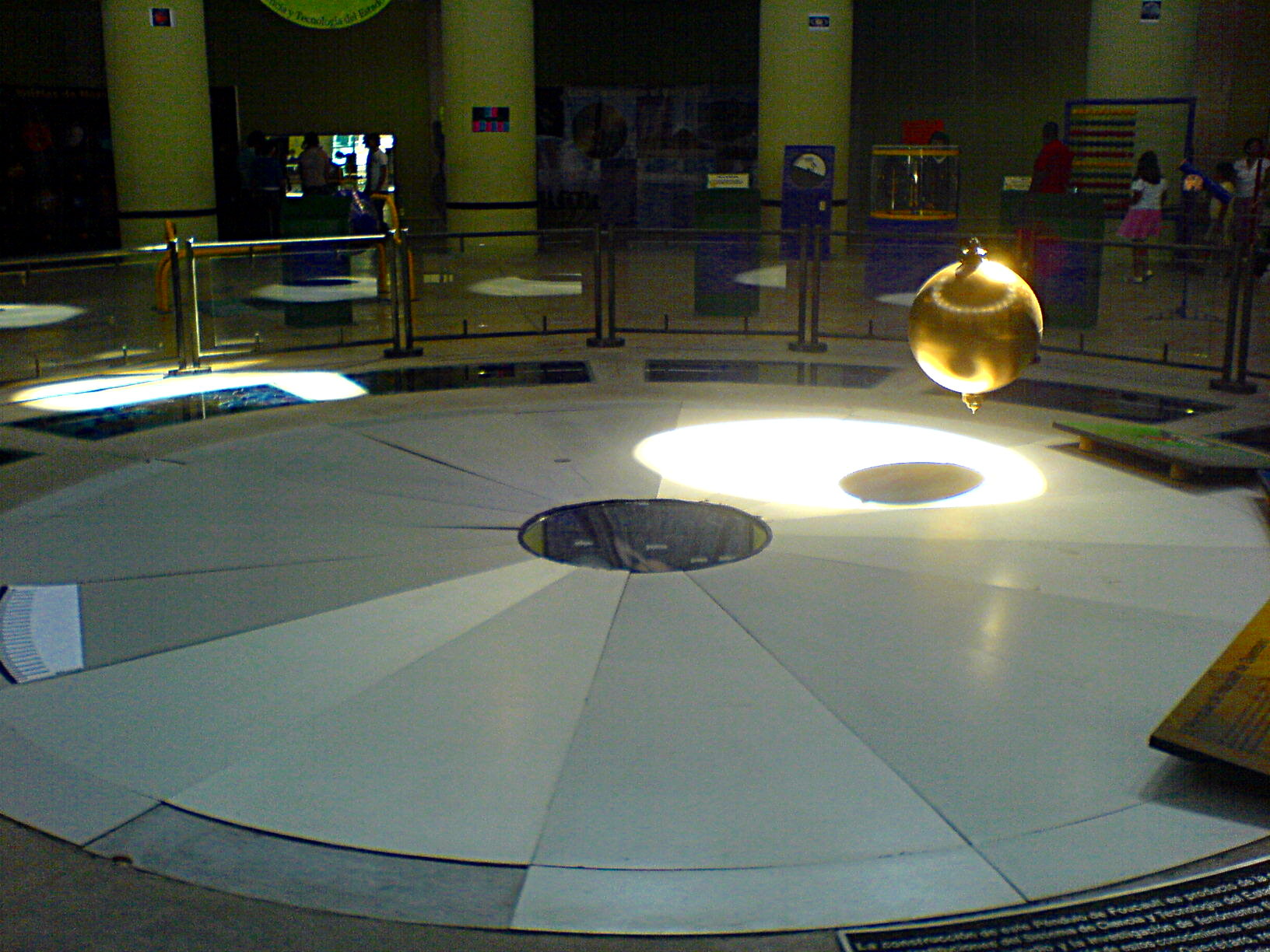
Pendulum in the Querétaro museum of science and technology.

The Museum of the City is in the former Royal Convent of Santa Clara. In the 18th century, sisters of the Capuchin order moved from Mexico City to Querétaro to occupy this complex, which was built by the city for them. This was done to show the city's economic strength as well as secure its social position in New Spain. After the Reform Laws, this building had a number of uses, as a prison with Maximilian I as its most famous prisoner, a military barracks and offices. Today it is home to a cultural center. In 1997, the Museo de la Ciudad (Museum of the city), which belongs to the Instituto Queretano de la Cultura y las Artes (Querétaro Institute of Culture and the Arts) was moved to this building, and is mostly dedicated to contemporary art. In addition to the permanent collection, the museum sponsors temporary exhibitions of drawings, photographs, sculptures, etc. as well as recitals in dance, music and other arts. The museum has exchange programs with Sweden and has established the Children's Library of the Museum of the city. Its goal is to interest children in the arts through books, workshops and other activities. The Church of Santa Clara maintains its religious function. Inside are six Baroque altarpieces and a choir loft, all of which are covered in gold leaf. On the altarpieces sculptures and paintings of saints appear, as well as the faces of angels among the thickly textured ornamentation covering the altarpieces.

The Teatro de la República was built between 1845 and 1852 and originally called Teatro Iturbide. In 1867, the court martial of Maximiliano I and his generals, Miguel Miramón and Tomás Mejía sentenced the three to death. The Constitution of 1917 was promulgated here. In 1922, the governor of Querétaro state changed the name to its current one in honor of the 1917 event. The theatre is primarily used for acts and ceremonies on the state, national and international levels, such as the swearing in of the state's governor.

The city still contains a number of mansions from the colonial era, most of which have been converted into a number of uses. One of these is the La Casa de la Zacatecana on Independencia 51, which has been restored as a museum to show what many of these mansions were like. Associated with this house as well as others are stories about love, murder and retribution. Another of these houses is the House of the Marquess (Marquesa House), which was an opulent residence that now serves as a hotel. The courtyard is in the Mudéjar or Spanish Moorish style, with Moorish arches and patterned walls. This area serves as the hotel's lobby.

The Emperor Maximilian Memorial Chapel is on top of the Hill of Bells where Emperor Maximilian died.

== Sister cities ==
- Bakersfield, California, United States
- Orange, California, United States
- Holland, Michigan, United States
- Indianapolis, Indiana, United States
- Santiago de Cuba, Santiago de Cuba Province, Cuba
- Santiago de Compostela, Galicia, Spain
- Santiago de Chile, Chile
- Shijiazhuang, Hebei, China
- Guácimo, Limón Province, Costa Rica
- Heredia, Heredia Province, Costa Rica
- Moravia, San José Province, Costa Rica
- (South Korea) Yeosu, Jeollanam-do, Republic of Korea
- Morelia, Michoacán, Mexico
- Mérida, Yucatán, Mexico
- Tuxtla, Chiapas, Mexico

== Gallery ==
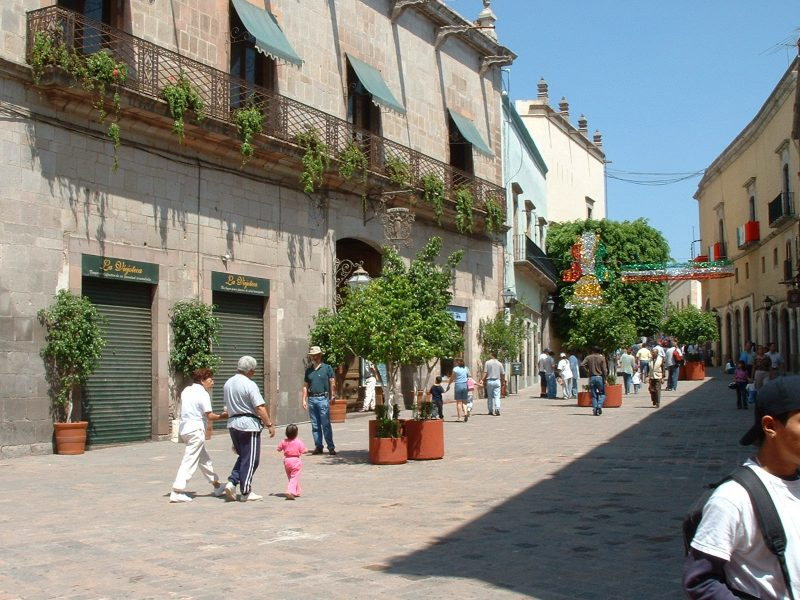
A street in the historic district of Querétaro

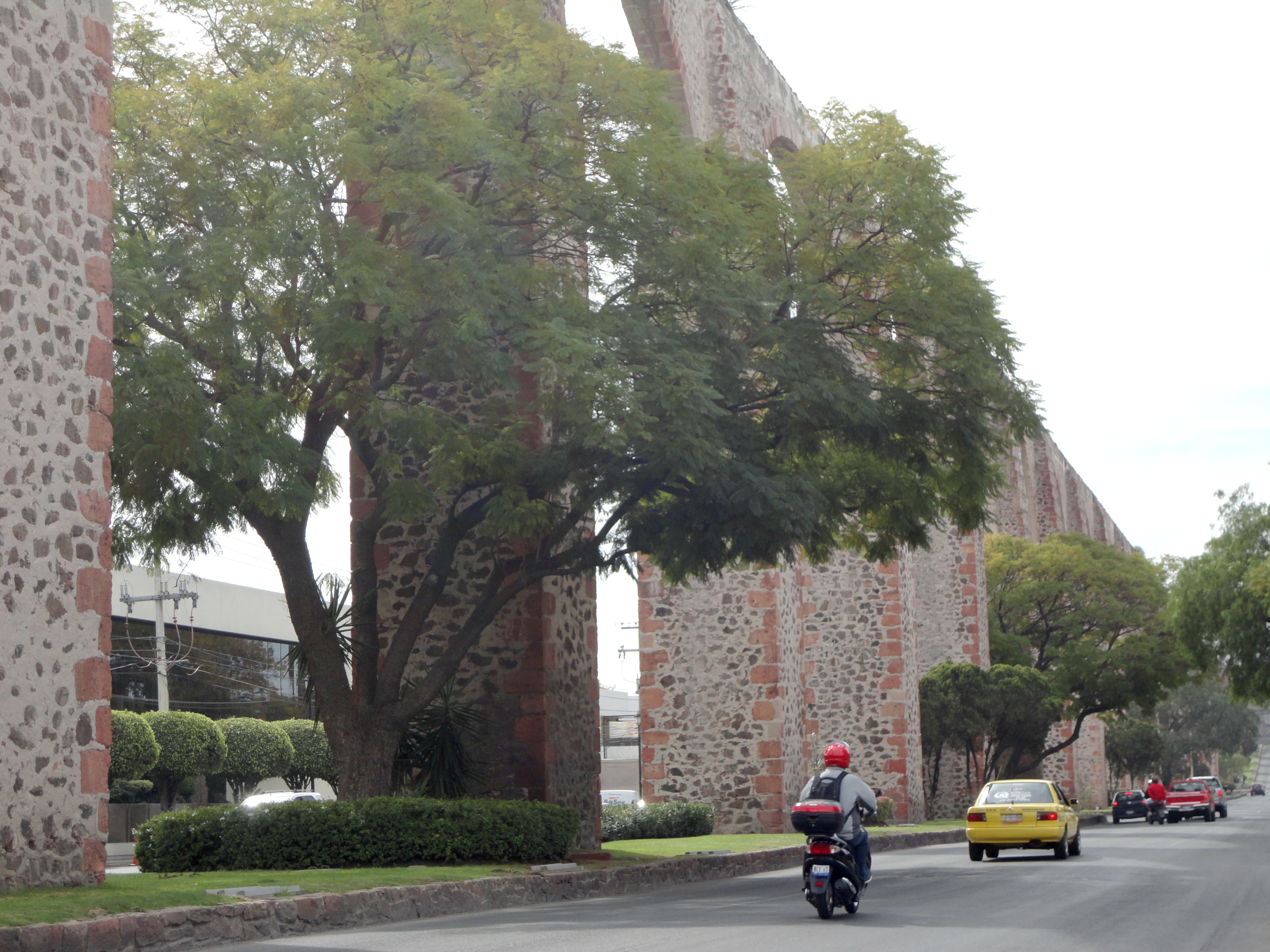
Aqueduct.

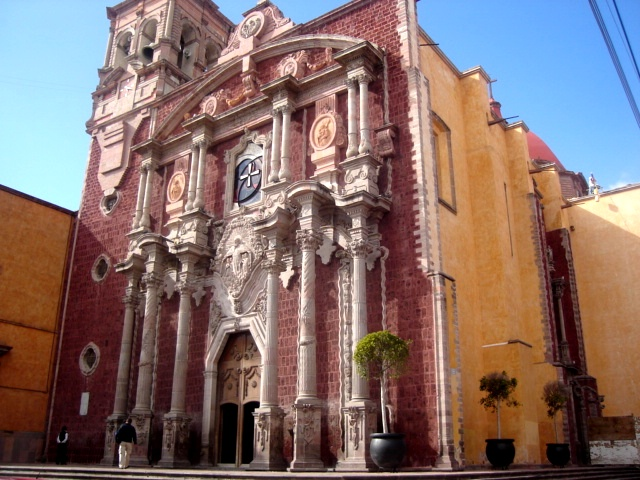
Cathedral of Querétaro.

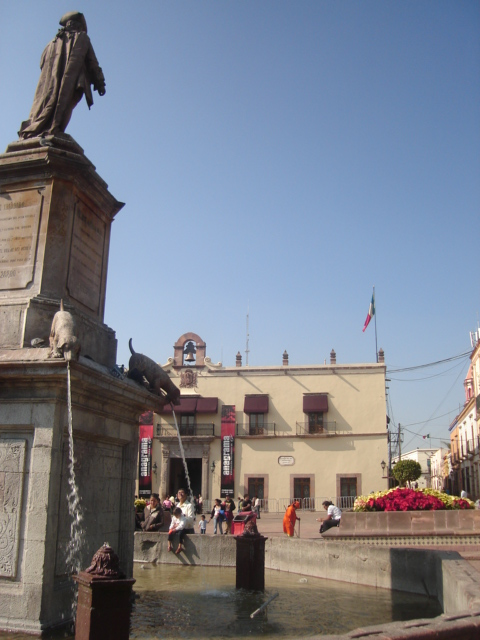
Casa de la Corregidora.

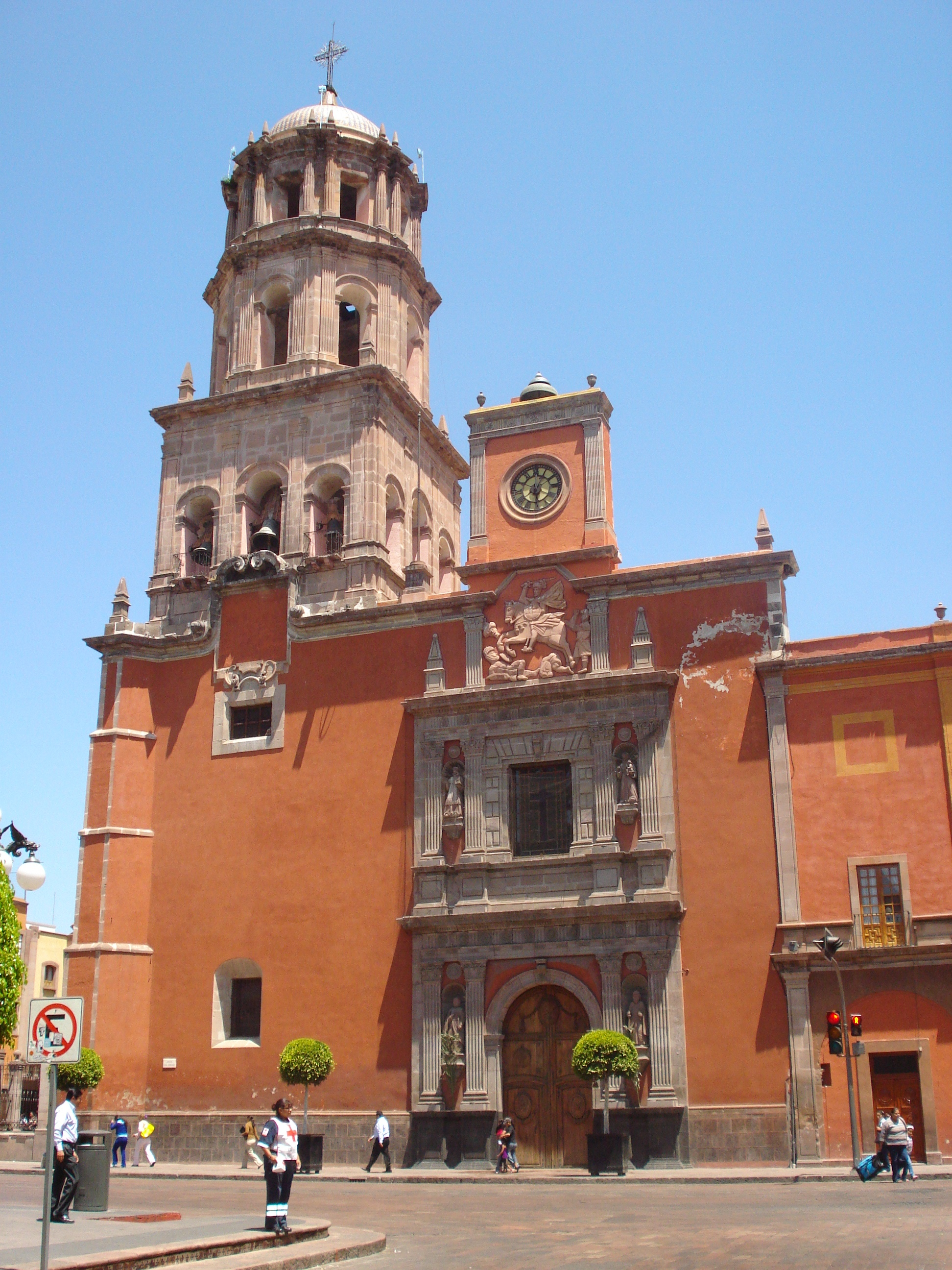
San Francisco church.

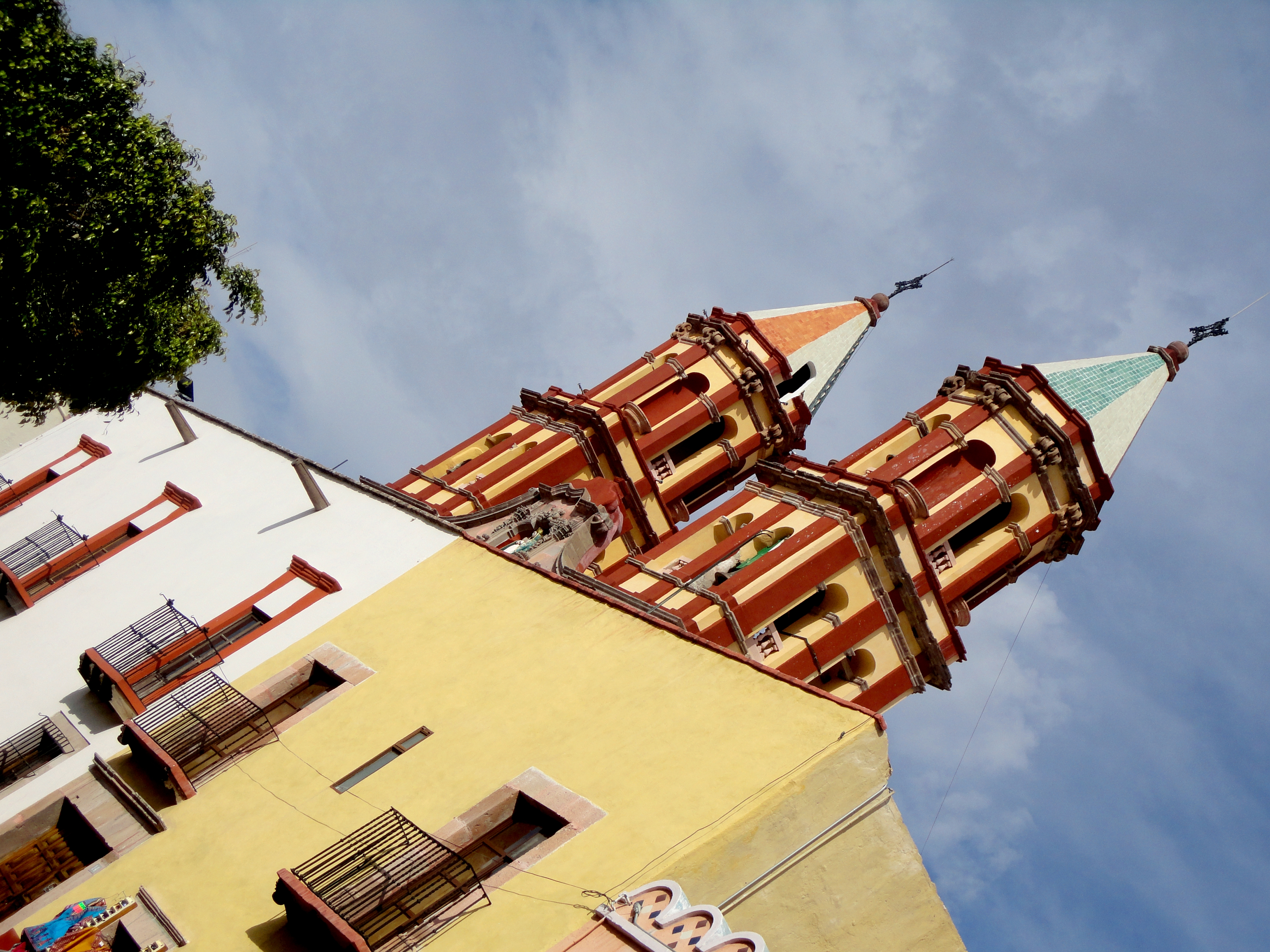
Historic center.

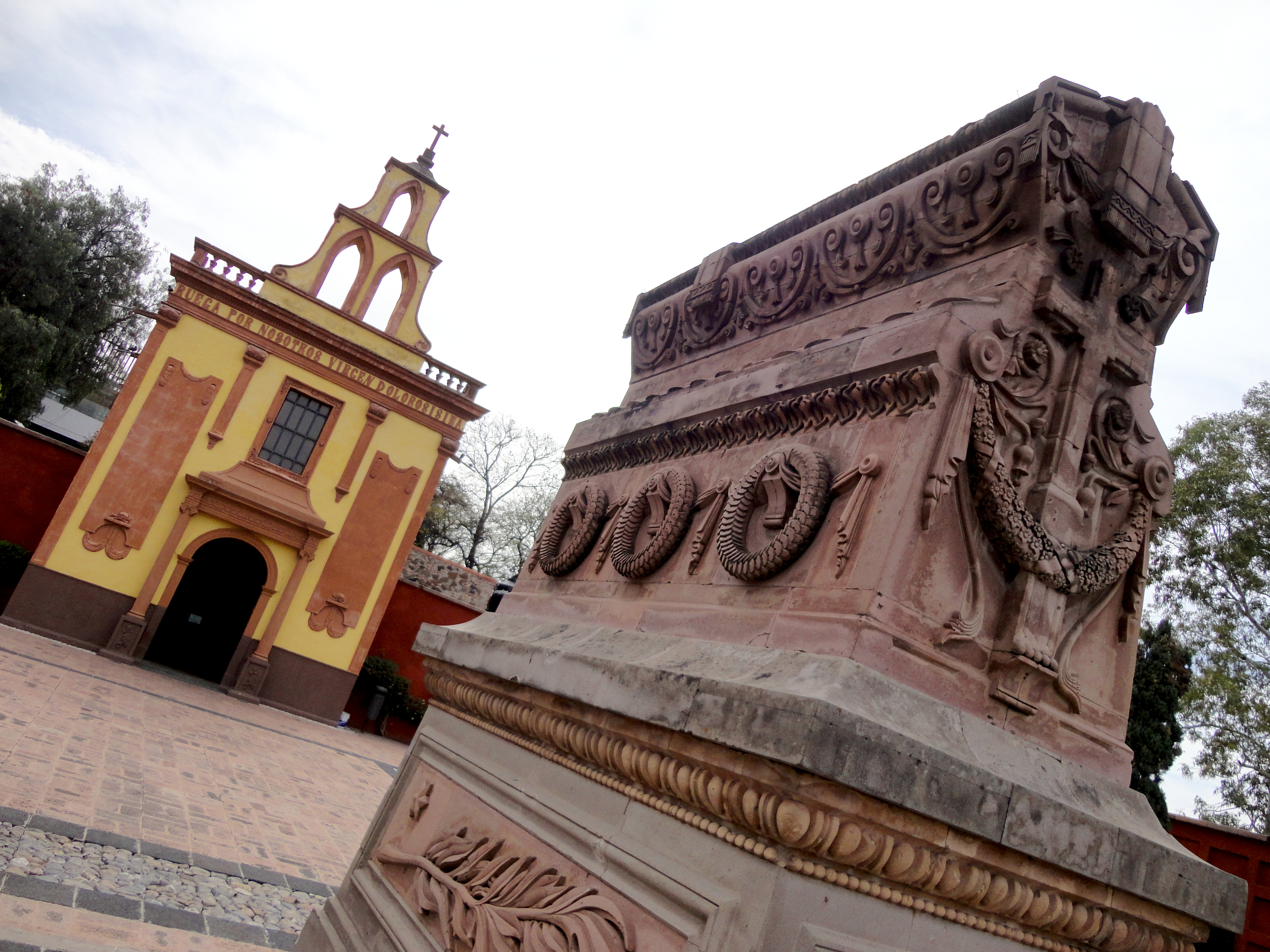
Josefa Ortiz de Domínguez Mausoleum.

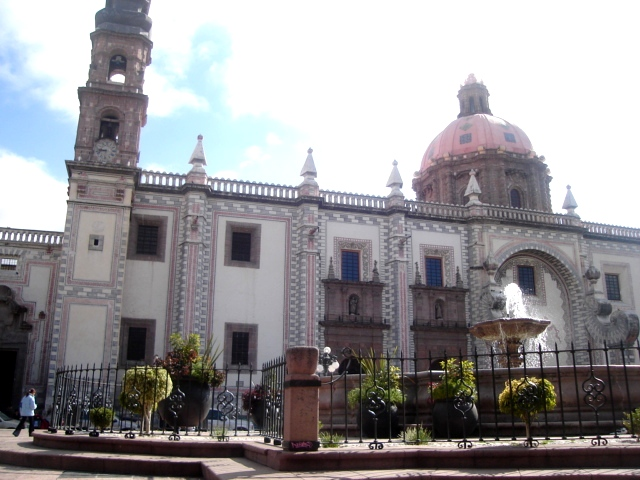
Santa Rosa de Viterbo.

== Notable Natives ==
- Diego Pacheco (born 1995) - footballer
- Francisco León de la Barra - president of Mexico from May 25, 1911 to November 26,1911
- Manuel Gómez Pedraza – president of Mexico from December 24, 1832 to March 31, 1833
