= Antaki =

ʾAnṭākī (Arabic: أنطاكي) is a Levantine Arabic surname or nisba, which means a person from Antioch (أنطاكية ʾAnṭākiya in Arabic). It may refer to:

- ʿAbdallāh ibn al-Faḍl al-Anṭākī
- Abd al-Masih al-Antaki
- Dawud al-Antaki
- Ikram Antaki
- Naim Antaki
- Patrick Antaki
- Paul Antaki
- Yaḥyā ibn Saʿīd al-Anṭākī
