= Pseudo-Maximus =

Pseudo-Maximus (or Pseudo-Maximos) is the conventional designation given to the anonymous author of a work misattributed to a Maximus, such as Maximus the Confessor or Maximus of Turin. Such works include:

- Life of the Virgin (Maximus)
- Loci communes (Pseudo-Maximus)
