= The Remaining Signs of Past Centuries =

1000 AD book by al-Biruni

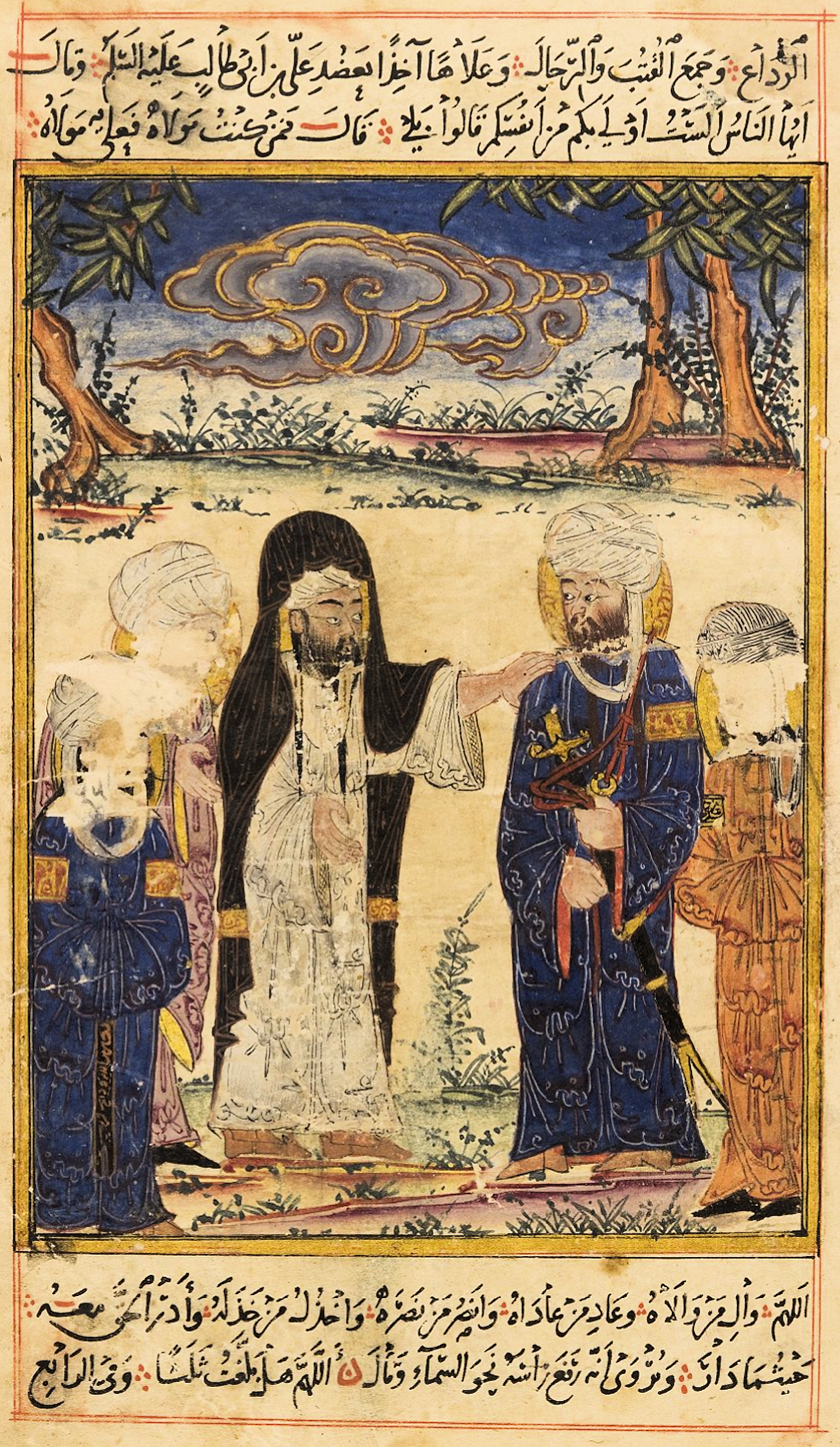
- The Investiture of Ali at Ghadir Khumm, northern Iraq or northwestern Iran, 1307-08 (Edinburgh University Library, MS Or. 161, fol. 162r)
- Original title: کتاب الآثار الباقية عن القرون الخالية

The Remaining Signs of Past Centuries (Arabic: کتاب الآثار الباقية عن القرون الخالية; Kitāb al-āthār al-bāqiyah `an al-qurūn al-khāliyah), also known as Chronology of Ancient Nations or Vestiges of the Past (after the translation published by Eduard Sachau in 1879), by Abū Rayhān al-Bīrūnī is a comparative study of the calendrical timekeeping of different cultures and civilizations, supported by mathematical, astronomical, and historical research. The text establishes a universal timeline and charts significant historical events, relating the customs and religions of different peoples in time.

For centuries after its publication in 1000 AD (AH 390/1), the text served as the standard reference on the history of Muslim territories. The Remaining Signs of Past Centuries is Al-Biruni's first major work, compiled in Gorgan when he was in his late twenties, at the court of Qabus, the Ziyarid ruler of Gorgan. The text is dedicated to Qabus.

== Manuscripts ==
The Remaining Signs of Past Centuries is preserved in more than twenty manuscripts of which the earliest is Istanbul ms. Beyazit 4667 [= Umumi 4667], dated 603 AH (1206/07 AD).

=== Illuminated manuscripts ===
A small number of these manuscripts are also illuminated: the best known are Edinburgh, University Library, MS Or. 161 and Paris, Bibliothèque Nationale de France, MS Arabe 1489.

The Edinburgh, University Library copy is an Ilkhanid codex created by Ibn al-Kutbi in AH 707 (1307–1308 AD) in northwestern Iran or northern Iraq. It contains 179 folios and 25 paintings. The frontispiece and subsequent illustrations are composed in rich color and accented by gold-leaf. This manuscript is considered exemplary of the artistry of medieval Persian book painting. There is a mark of recent ownership by R.M. Binning, dated July 4, 1851.

The Paris, Bibliothèque Nationale de France manuscript is a close Ottoman copy of the Edinburgh codex. It is both undated and anonymous, in contrast to its Edinburgh prototype. While the complete provenance is unknown, there are marks of possession by al-Zāʾiraǧī Ramaḍān ibn Muḥammad and Abū Bakr ibn Rustum ibn Aḥmad al-Širwānī.

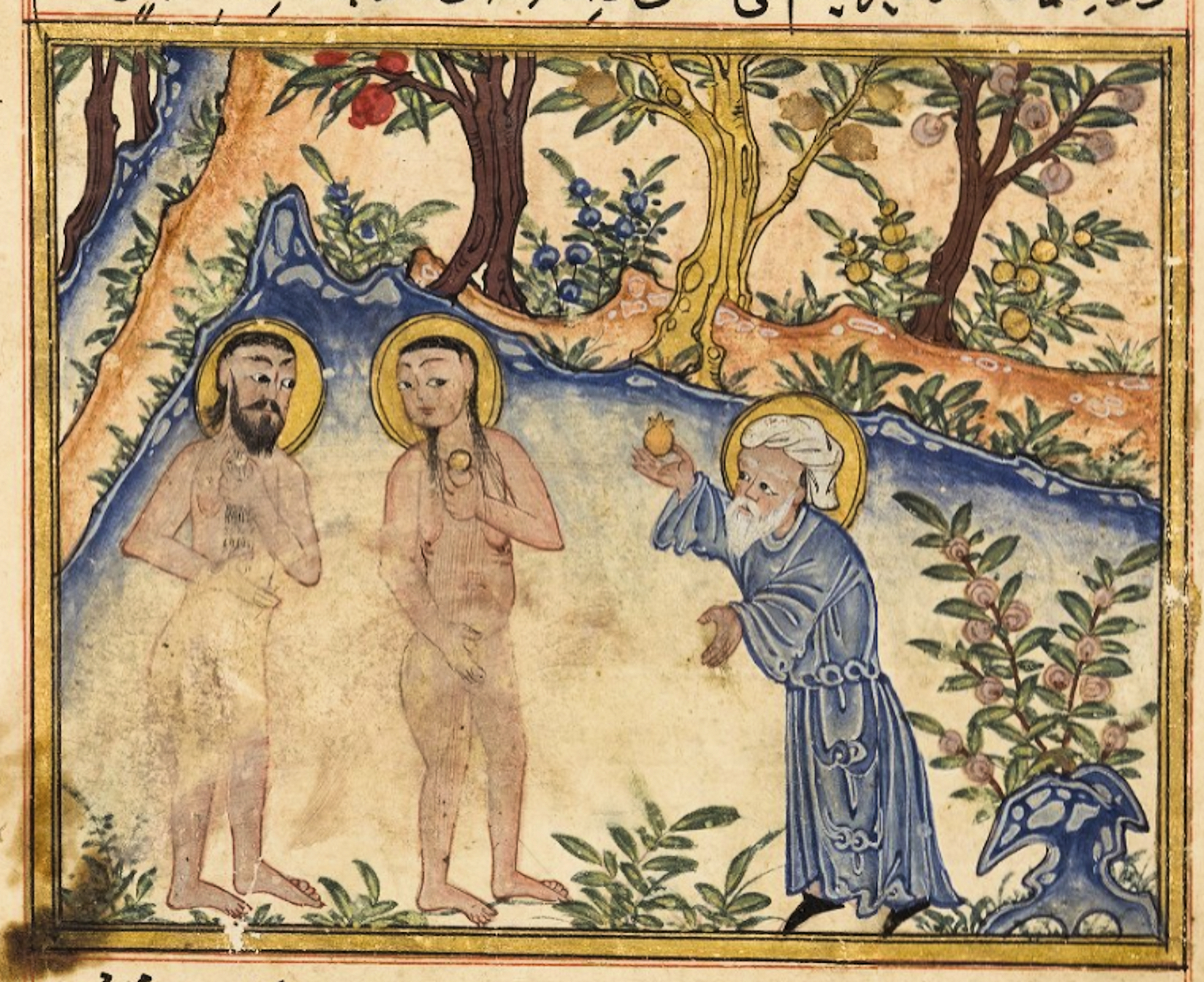
Story of Adam and Eve

The choice and placement of illustrations throughout the text form a larger cycle which emphasizes the interest of the Ilkhanids in religions other than the predominant Islam. Many illustrations show specific episodes related to Zoroastrianism, Manichaeism, Buddhism, Judaism, and Christianity. Other illustrations show a keen interest in topics of history and science. Similarly located in the manuscript is the account of the birth of Julius Caesar illustrated with a realistic rendition of a cesarean section, the death of Eli and the reactions of those of the Jewish faith, and an Arab congregation witnessing the Prophet Muhammad's spoken word.

The framing of the text by the illustrations, lends a political urgency to the cultures of foreign peoples, while still retaining a strong Iranian national sentiment. Ibn al-Kutbi's nationalistic tendencies are evident in his frequent visual reference to personalities featured in the Shahnama and those celebrated in Persian history, as well as his illustration of Persian festivals, and evocation of Persian rebellion against foreign powers.

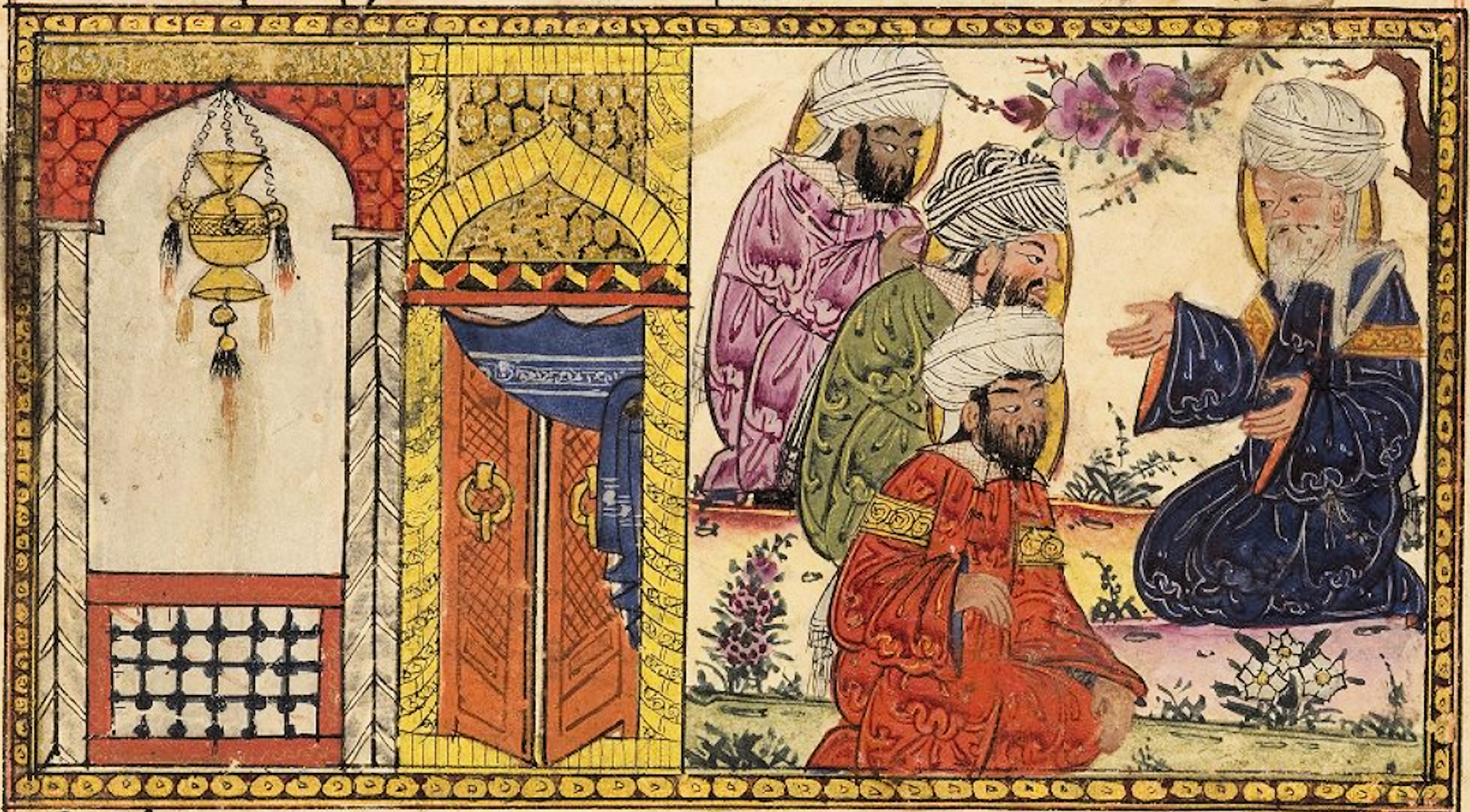
Men engaging in prayer (Edinburgh University Library, MS Or. 161, folio 129v)

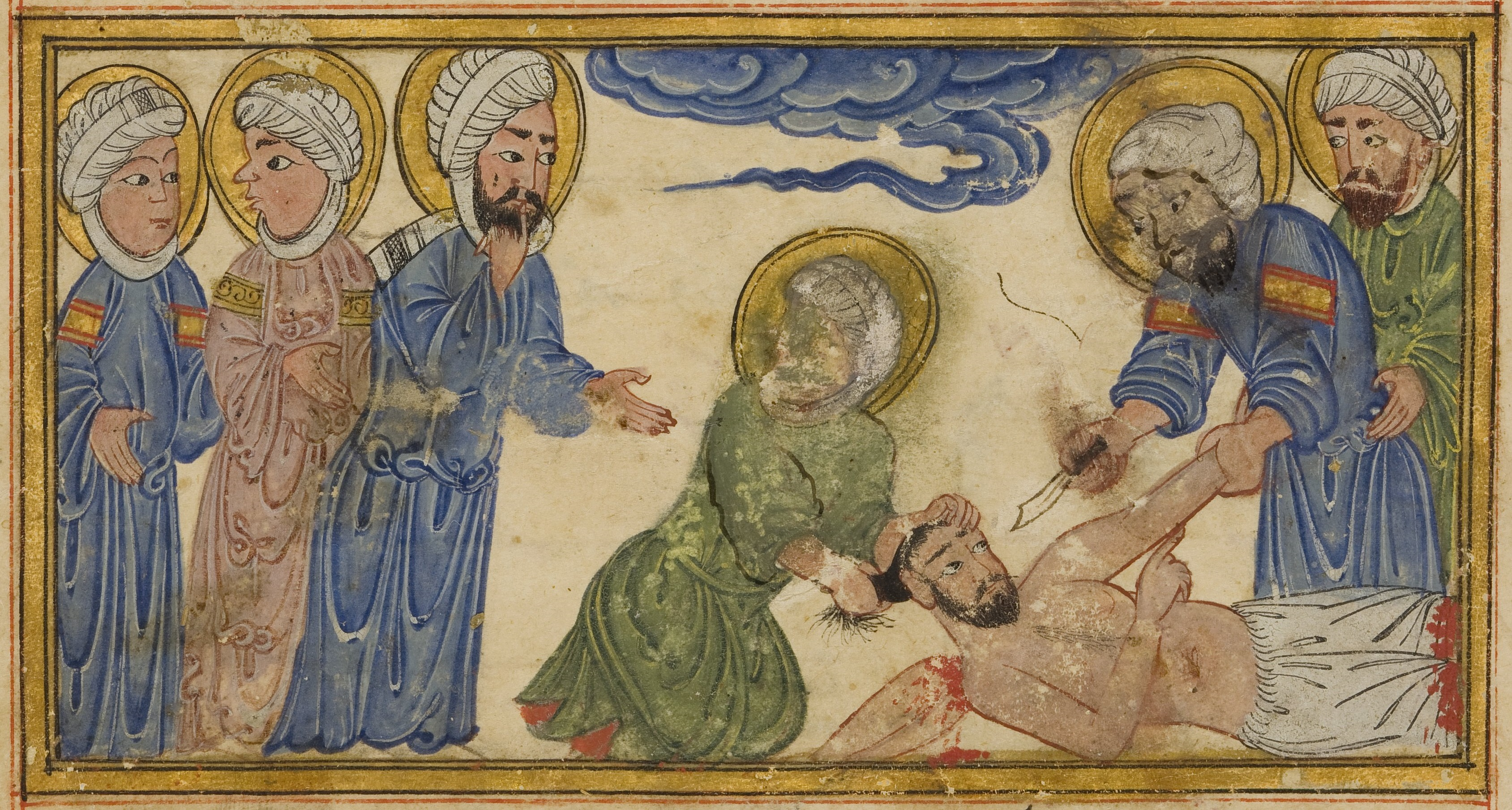
Execution of al-Hallaj (Edinburgh University Library, MS Or. 161, folio 94r)

The images are kept in a hybrid style between that of pre-Mongol period Persia and the Chinese style introduced with the Mongol invasions. Of the twenty-five total images, two are considered purely pre-Mongol in style, nineteen are considered hybrid, but closer to pre-Mongol, and four are considered hybrid, but very nearly post-Mongol. Pre-Mongol compositions are characterized by their random placement upon folio paper, whereas hybrid compositions often feature a frame. Pre-Mongol images also are typically standard in their arrangement of figures upon a singular plane. This is distinct from hybrid images which display more complex dimension. The illustrations in The Remaining Signs of Past Centuries additionally exemplify relative cultural nuance due to Al-Biruni's extensive ethnographic research. Through travel he developed thorough and distinctive descriptions of different ethnic groups. However, these descriptions were further implemented as stereotypes, and any individual who was of a particular ethnicity was made to appear almost identical to any other member of the same group.

The Shi`ite inclination of those responsible for the production is particularly evident in the two concluding images, the largest and most elaborate in the manuscript. These illuminations illustrate two episodes in the life of Muhammad, both centrally involving `Ali, Hasan, and Husayn: The Day of Cursing (fol. 161r) and The Investiture of `Ali at Ghadir Khumm (fol. 162r). The Edinburgh manuscript has a total of five images depicting Muhammad, including the first miniature which shows the Prophet as he prohibits Nasīʾ (fol. 6v). These illuminations are among the earliest depictions of Muhammad in Persian art.

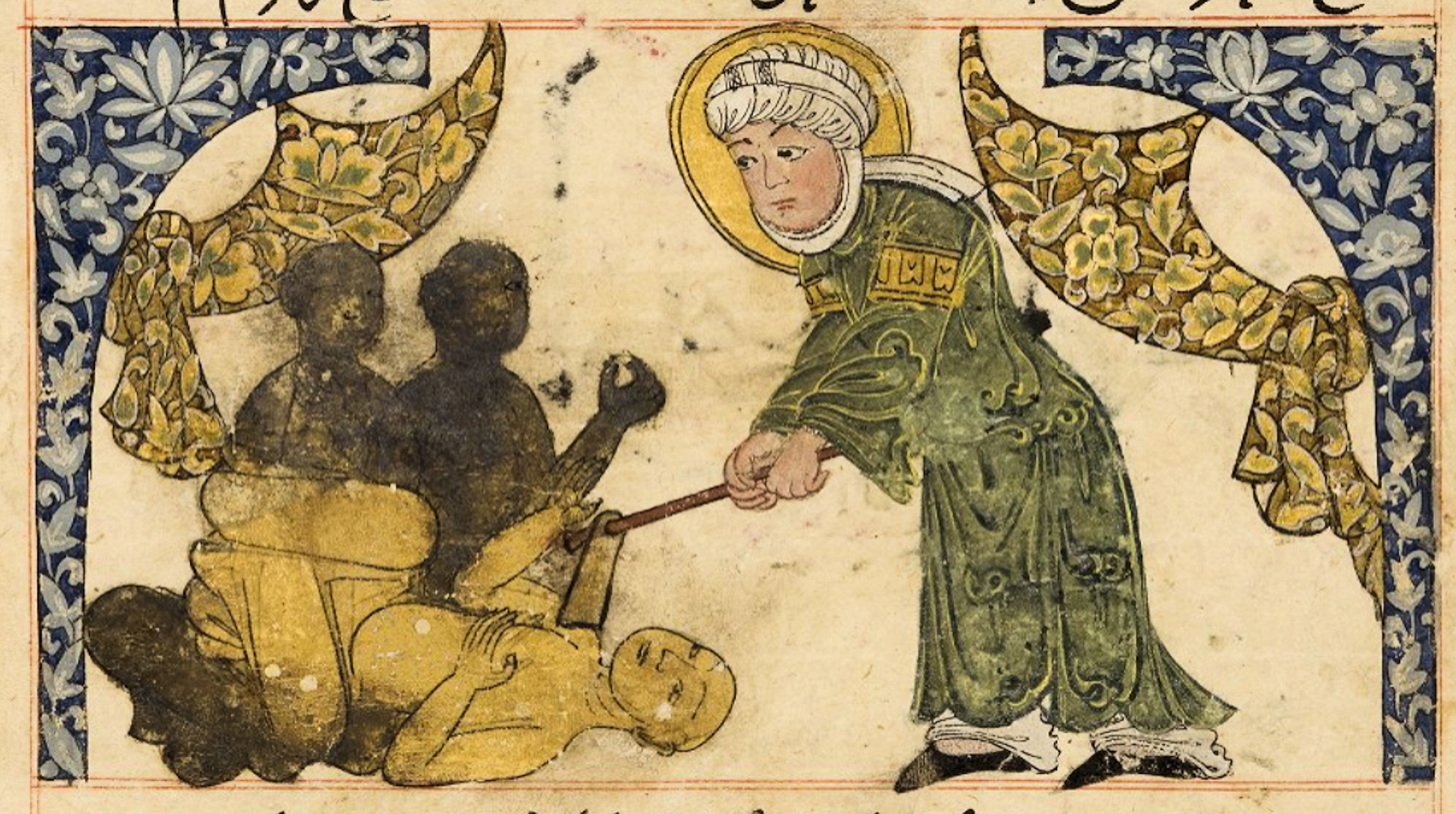
Abraham destroying the idols of the Sabians (Edinburgh University Library, MS Or. 161, folio 88v)

One particular illumination depicting Abraham destroying the idols of the Sabians has sparked significant discourse over iconoclasm in the context of Islamic figural representations.

== Content ==
In The Remaining Signs of Past Centuries, al-Biruni expresses his ideas regarding the philosophy and methodologies of history, especially through a scientific lens. He begins with an introduction establishing the relevance of history, geography, and the interconnectedness of civilizations. He proposes the need for studying different cultures and civilizations to gain a broader understanding of the world. In doing so, he defends the legitimacy of his work.

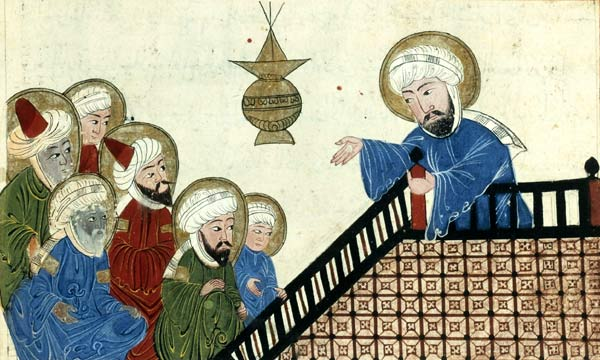
Muhammad prohibiting Nasīʾ (sura 9:36f.), fol. 5v. of the 17th century copy (MS Arabe 1489), corresponding to fol. 6v of the Edinburgh codex

The Remaining Signs of Past Centuries presents a chronological account of historical events, focusing on the rise and fall of civilizations, dynasties, and empires. Al-Bīrūnī covers ancient civilizations such as the Greeks, Romans, Persians, and Indians, among others. His approach to history is analytical and comparative, examining the causes and effects of historical events. He specifically references the birth and death of the Caliphs, Shia Imams, Fatimah (daughter of Muhammad) and Khadija (Muhammad's wife). Historical understanding is further supplemented by analysis of the cultural practices, customs, and traditions of these societies and individuals. Al-Bīrūnī explores topics like religion, language, art, and science, highlighting the diversity and richness of human culture.

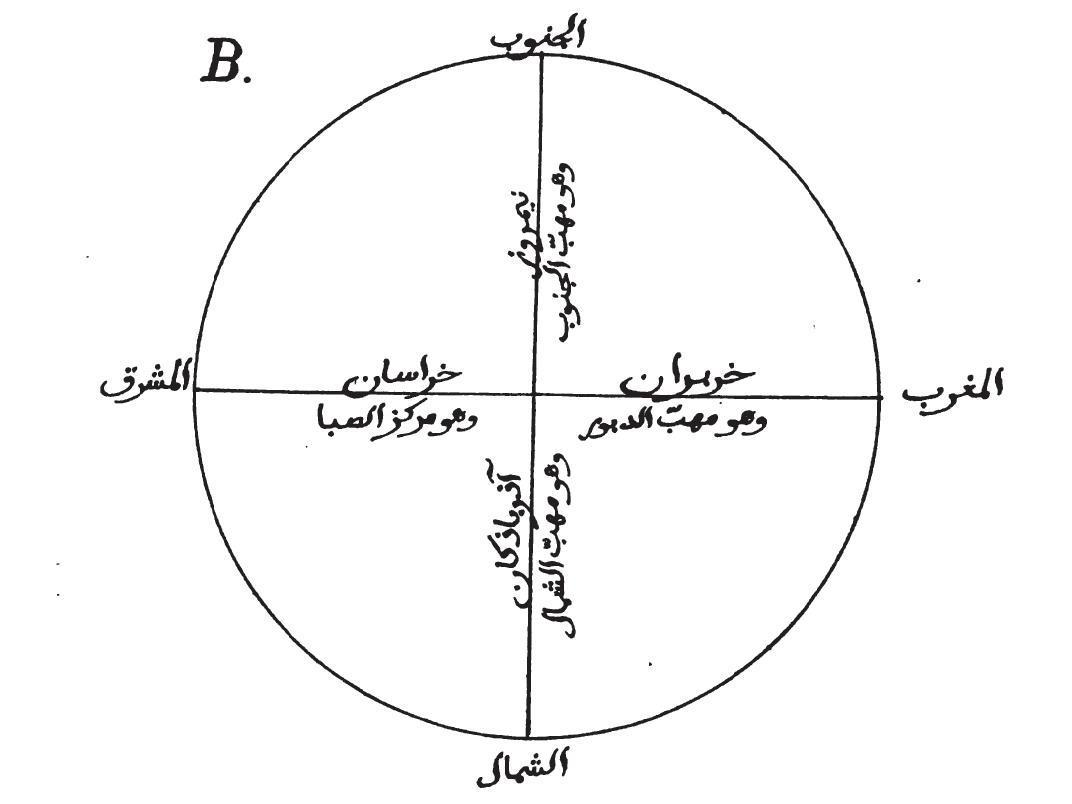
Mathematical Sketch drawn from The Remaining Signs of Past Centuries (Edinburgh University Library, MS Or. 161, folio vii)

Al-Bīrūnī was a polymath with an interest in science and astronomy. In The Remaining Signs of Past Centuries, he gives an overview of the most significant scientific theories, astronomical observations, and mathematical concepts of his time. Discussing the astrolabe, al-Biruni considers the orthographic cylindrical projection as his own invention, expanding upon the work of Al-Saghani. He also describes two novel projections he has created, which are nowadays called the azimuthal equidistant and the Nicolosi globular. He integrates this scientific knowledge with historical and cultural insights.

A unique aspect of the book is Al-Bīrūnī's methodological approach to the formation of an established historical account. He emphasizes the importance of empirical observation, critical analysis, and cross-cultural comparison. His rigorous methodology sets a precedent for later scholars in the fields of history, geography, and anthropology.

== Editions ==
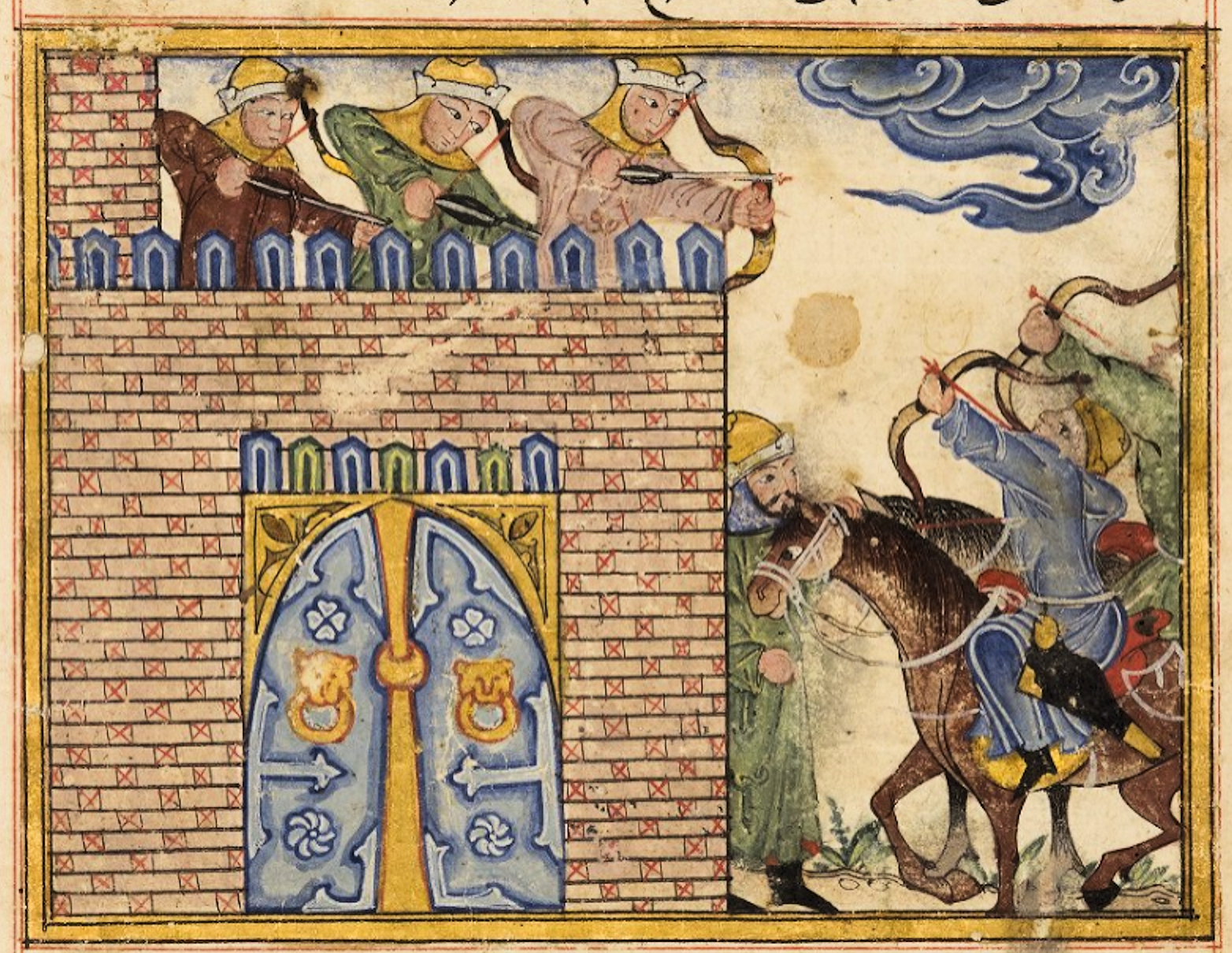
14th century miniature
(Or Ms 161)

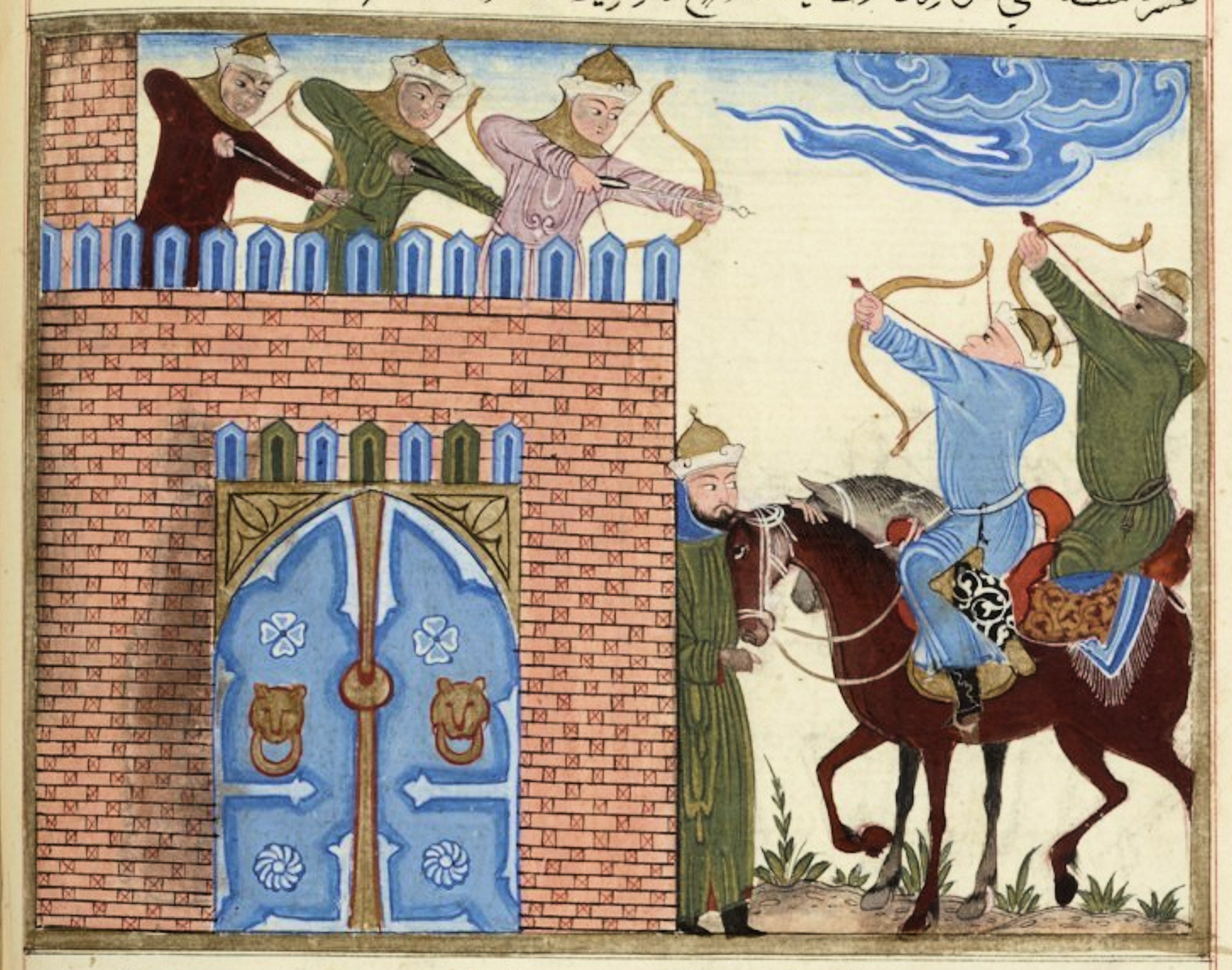
17th century miniature
(Arabe 1489)

Comparison between the two versions of The Remaining Signs of Past Centuries
- C. Eduard Sachau (ed.), Chronologie orientalischer Völker von Alberuni, Leipzig 1878 (Internet Archive link), reprinted Leipzig 1923, Baghdad 1963.
- C. Eduard Sachau (transl.), The Chronology of Ancient Nations: An English Version of the Arabic Text of the Athâr-ul-Bâkiya of Albîrûnî, or 'Vestiges of the Past', Collected and Reduced ... by the Author in A. H. 390–1, A. D. 1000 , London 1879 (Internet Archive link).
  - 1969 reprint: Minerva-Verlag; Unverand edition.
  - 1984 reprint: Aristide D Caratzas Pub. ISBN 978-0-89241-178-8.
  - 2002 reprint: Adamant Media Corporation, ISBN 978-1-4021-6079-0.
  - 2004 reprint: Kessinger Publishing, ISBN 0-7661-8908-2.

== Sources ==
- Hillenbrand, Robert (2000). "Images of Muhammad in al-Biruni's Chronology of Ancient Nations.'". In Hillenbrand (ed.). Persian Painting from the Mongols to the Qajars: Studies in Honour of Basil W. Robinson. Pembroke Persian Papers, 3. London and New York: I. B. Tauris in association with the Centre of Middle Eastern Studies, University of Cambridge.
- Soucek, Priscilla P. (1975). "An Illustrated Manuscript of al-Biruni's Chronology of Ancient Nations". In Peter J. Chelkowski (ed.). The Scholar and the Saint: Studies in Commemoration of Abul-Rayhan al-Biruni and Jalal al-Din al-Rumi. New York: Hagop Kevorkian Center for Near Eastern Studies, New York University Press.
- Blair, Sheila S. (1993). The Development of the Illustrated Book in Iran. Muqarnas.
- Saliba, G. (2006). "Al-Biruni and the sciences of his time". Religion, Learning and Science in the 'Abbasid Period. Cambridge University Press. p. 316. ISBN 0-521-02887-6.
- Hopkins, J. F. P. (2006). "Geographical and navigational literature". Religion, Learning and Science in the 'Abbasid Period. Cambridge University Press. pp. 405–423. ISBN 0-521-02887-6.
