= George (eparch) =

George (Greek: Γεώργιος) was a Byzantine governor in Africa (modern Tunisia and eastern Algeria) from ca. 632/634 to ca. 642.

Very little is known about his life. According to John Moschos, he came from Apameia in Syria. He is recorded as "eparch of Carthage", which would imply that he was a praetorian prefect. He was a supporter of the prominent theologian Maximus the Confessor, and was, according to the Doctrina Jacobi, responsible for the forced conversion of the African Jews to Christianity, as decreed by the Emperor Heraclius. The latter fact indicates that his tenure in Africa began in 634 at the latest, and possibly as early as 632.

== Sources ==
- Pringle, Denys (1981). The Defence of Byzantine Africa from Justinian to the Arab Conquest: An Account of the Military History and Archaeology of the African Provinces in the Sixth and Seventh Century. Oxford, United Kingdom: British Archaeological Reports. pp. 45–46. ISBN 0-86054-119-3.
- Winkelmann, Friedhelm; Lilie, Ralph-Johannes; et al. (1999). "Georgios (# 1962)". Prosopographie der mittelbyzantinischen Zeit: I. Abteilung (641–867), 1. Band: Aaron (# 1) – Georgios (# 2182) (in German). Walter de Gruyter. p. 615. ISBN 978-3-11-015179-4.
