= Dawud al-Antaki =

16th century Syrian physician and pharmacist

Dawud Ibn Umar Al-Antaki also known as Dawud Al-Antaki (Arabic: داود الأنطاكي) was a blind Muslim physician and pharmacist active in Cairo. He was born during the 16th century in Al-Fu'ah and died around in Mecca in 1597. He lived most of his life in Antioch before made a pilgrimage to Mecca and took advantage of the trip to visited Damascus and Cairo. He will then settle in Mecca.

After the heyday of medicine in the medieval Islamic world, Daud Al-Antaki was one of three great names in the field of Arabic medicine in the 14th and 15th centuries CE, alongside the Iraqi scholar Yusuf Ibn Ismail Al-Kutbi and the Ottoman physician Khadir Ibn Ali Hajji Basa.

== Works ==
=== Tadhkr Al Qabb ===
Tadhkir al-Qabb is a three-part medical book dealing with herbal medicines and includes descriptions of over 3,000 medicinal and aromatic plants.

=== Others ===
Daud al-Antaki also wrote The Book of Precious Kohl for the Evacuation of the President's Eyes an explanation of Ibn Sina's poem. He also wrote three books on astronomy, some books on logic and a book on psychiatry that contains hadiths in medical advice.
