= Life of the Virgin (Maximus) =

Earliest known biographical work on the Virgin Mary

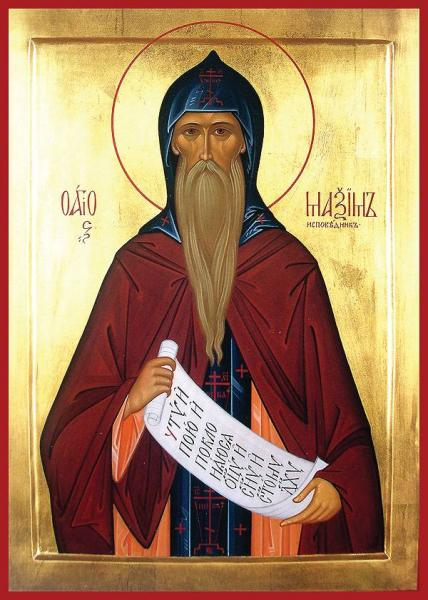
Icon of Maximus the Confessor.

The Life of the Virgin is the earliest known biographical work on the Virgin Mary. Its only extant copy is in a Georgian translation attributed to the seventh-century saint, Maximus the Confessor, although the attribution remains less than certain.

Maximus (or Pseudo-Maximus (Note: The conventional designation given to the anonymous author of a work misattributed to a Maximus.)) states that he compiled the biography by merging information from multiple sources available to him.

Maximus presents Mary as a constant companion in Jesus' mission, and as a leader of the early Christian Church after the death of Jesus. He also states that Mary was the source of many of the accounts of the life of Jesus in the Gospels.

Maximus also portrays Mary as the counselor and guide to the many women disciples who followed Jesus during his life and as their source of spiritual guidance after the death of Jesus.

== Authenticity ==
It is doubted that this work is by Maximus the Confessor.

"In a series of recent articles Stephen Shoemaker (esp. Shoemaker 2012), following Michel van Esbroeck, has argued in favour of Maximus' authorship of the Greek model for a Georgian 'Life of the Virgin'. This is improbable for various reasons both historical and theological. In short: first, the argument depends on the notion that Maximus spent some time in Constantinople in the period c.620-26, which lacks direct attestation; second, none of Maximus' characteristic preoccupations appear in the 'Life', and in turn none of the 'Life's central themes appear in the fleeting Marian reflections contained within his genuine corpus; third, there is no extant Greek manuscript which witnesses the text, in whole or in part; fourth, both admirers of Maximus (e.g. Sophronius, John of Damascus) and those who describe his works (e.g. Photius, Anastasius Bibliothecarius) show no knowledge of the 'Life'; and fifth, there is no witness to the existence of the entire 'Life' before the second half of the tenth century. For the arguments in more detail see Booth (forthcoming)."

A recent theory suggests that the Life of the Virgin was actually composed by the monk Euthymius the Athonite, who in turn made a paraphrased translation of an earlier Life written by John Geometres.

== Editions ==
- Maximus the Confessor, The Life of the Virgin: Translated, with an Introduction and Notes, Stephen J. Shoemaker, trans. (New Haven: Yale University Press, 2012) (ISBN 0300175043)
- Vie de la Vierge by Michel von Esbroeck. This edition is based on the oldest surviving manuscript, Tbilissi A-40.
