= Loci communes (Pseudo-Maximus) =

Table of contents of the Arabic translation in Saint Catherine's Monastery, Sinai, MS Arab 66 from 1266

The Loci communes (Commonplaces) or Capita theologica (Theological Chapters) (Note: The Latin titles are conventional. Its full Greek title, in English translation, is Sayings from Various Poets and Rhetors, Both External and from Our Own Holy and God-Beloved Paideia.) is a Byzantine Greek florilegium containing a mix of Judeo-Christian and pagan selections. It was originally compiled in the late 9th or early 10th century (Note: Sibylle Ihm dates it to between 650 and 1000.) and subsequently enlarged around the year 1000.

Misattributed to Maximus the Confessor, it was one of the most widely reproduced "sacro-profane" florilegia. Copies are preserved in some 90 manuscripts in three recensions: the original, the enlarged version and a later abridged version.

The quotations contained in the Loci communes are mostly edifying and apophthegmatic. They are grouped into 71 chapters. The chapters may, very roughly, be arranged thematically. Within each chapter, quotations from the New Testament come first, followed by those from the Old Testament, the Church Fathers and finally pagan authors. Pagan authors outnumber Christian. Among the famous names are Thales, Pythagoras, Solon, Euripides, Socrates, Plato, Aristotle, Isocrates, Demosthenes, Diogenes, Philo, Epicurus and Menander. Topics of Christian dogma are not treated. The focus of the compilation is on ethics and human action, but its scope is broad, even encyclopedic. Its chapter headings are devoid of Christian references and appear to be inspired by those of the Anthologium of Stobaeus. Both works have a chapter entitled "Know thyself".

An Arabic translation, entitled Kitāb al-rawḍa (Book of the Garden), was made by ʿAbdallāh ibn al-Faḍl al-Anṭākī in the 11th century. It was completed no earlier than 1043. Ibn al-Faḍl used deliberately difficult language and provided glosses on his own translation. This extensive commentary by Ibn al-Faḍl sometimes misled past researchers to believe the entire text was his original compilation. The Kitāb al-rawḍa survives in at least eleven manuscripts. These do not contain the false attribution to Maximus. At least one 13th-century copy was abridged by removing most of the pagan sayings from the latter part of the work.

== Editions ==
- Ihm, Sibylle (ed.) Ps.-Maximus Confessor: Erste kritische Edition einer Redaktion des sacro-profanen Florilegiums Loci communes. Stuttgart, 2001.
- Sargologos, Étienne (ed.) Florilège sacro-profane du Pseudo-Maxime. Hermoupolis, 2001.
