= Ikram Antaki =

Syrian-Mexican writer (1948–2000)

Ikram Antaki (July 9, 1948 – October 31, 2000) was a Syrian-Mexican writer.

== Biography ==
Antaki was born in Damascus, Syria. Her grandfather served as the last governor of Antioch. At the age of four, she entered a French language Franciscan school, where she remained until obtaining her baccalaureate. Later, she emigrated to France to study comparative literature, social anthropology, and ethnology of the Arab world at the University of Paris VII. In 1975, in her own words, she decided to travel "to the end of the earth," choosing Mexico as the most distant possible place from her native Damascus. She eventually became a Mexican citizen and lived there for the rest of her life.

Antaki published 29 books in Spanish, French, and Arabic. During her time in Mexico she collaborated with Mexican television channels 11 and 13 and gained popularity due to her participation on "Monitor" radio news show, one of the most popular in the central region of the country. Her opinions were rather unorthodox: on several occasions she remarked that the generation of youth that participated in the movement of 1968 had been the poorest intellectually of 20th-century Mexico, that democracy had no place in the family or the school, and that plebiscites were a fascist invention.

Those who have written about her describe her as an extremely reserved person. She never learned to dance or to swim. Her readers, on the other hand, note the lightheartedness of her writings and lectures, the profundity of her investigations and her own originality.

She died October 31, 2000, in Mexico City, survived by one son, the Mexican author Maruan Soto Antaki.

== Selected works ==
- El pueblo que no quería crecer, 2000. (The people who didn't want to grow)
- El espíritu de Córdoba. (The spirit of Córdoba)
- A la vuelta del milenio. (To the turn of the millennium)
- El Manual del ciudadano contemporáneo, 2000. (Manual of the contemporary citizen)
- Segundo Renacimiento: pensamiento y fin de siglo, 1992. (The Second Renaissance: thought and the end of the century)
- En el banquete de Platón, 1996.
- Epiphanios, 1992.
- El secreto de Dios, 1992.
- La pira, 1990.
- La cultura de los árabes, 1989.
- Temas morales, 2002.
- Celebrar el pensamiento, 1999.
- La tercera cultura : nuestras raíces islamoárabes, 1990.
- Espiratualidad, 2000.
