= Abd Allah ibn al-Fadl =

Arab Orthodox translator and theologian

Abdallah ibn al-Fadl al-Antaki (Arabic: عبد الله بن الفضل بن عبد الله المطران الانطاكي) was an Arab Orthodox translator and theologian active in Antioch during the middle of the eleventh century, during a period of renewed Byzantine rule over the city. He was responsible for a large number of patristic translations, as well as original theological and philosophical works.

== Life and work ==
Little is known of his life, apart from what can be gleaned from manuscripts of his texts. He was a deacon and the grandson of a bishop also called Abdallah. He received an excellent education in both Arabic and Greek, having studied Arabic grammar with the famous poet Abul ʿAla Al-Maʿarri and patristic texts with an unidentified teacher called Symeon. Several of his works and translations were commissioned by notables from Antioch and neighbouring cities in Muslim territory. He translated the Loci communes, a Greek florilegium and wrote many works addressing theological and philosophical issues.

Ibn al-Fadl's most influential work was the translation of Psalms and of Gospel and Epistle readings into Arabic which remained in use in a variety of Arabic speaking Christian communities until the modern era. His psalms were used in the first printed Arabic book, the Kitab salat al-sawai.

Intellectually, he can be seen as the meeting point of the Hellenism of the Byzantine empire and that of the Arabic world.

== Works ==
1. The Book of Benefit (Kitab al-Manfa‘a)
2. Discourse on the Holy Trinity (Kalam fi l-lahut)
3. Book of the Joy of the Believer (Kitab Bahjat al-Mu'min)
4. Exposition of the Orthodox Faith (Sharh al-Amana al-Mustaqima wa-Ibanat Ghalat al-Ya'aqiba wa-l-Nastur 'Ala Sabil al-Ijaz)
5. Questions and Responses on the Trinity and the Incarnation (Masa'il wa-Ajwiba hawla al-Tathlith wa-l-Ittihad)
