= Patrick Antaki =

Lebanese skeleton racer

Patrick Antaki (born May 6, 1964) is a Lebanese Olympic sportsman. He is also American-naturalized skeleton racer who competed for Lebanon from 2002 to 2006. He finished 27th and last in the men's skeleton at the 2006 Winter Olympics in Turin.

Antaki's best finish at the FIBT World Championships was 26th in the men's skeleton event at Nagano in 2003

Born in Cairo, Egypt, Antaki earned a Bachelor of Science degree in electrical engineering from the Massachusetts Institute of Technology in 1984. He became interested in skeleton after watching the skeleton events on television at the 2002 Winter Olympics in Salt Lake City. He lived in Dallas, Texas at the time of the 2006 games in Turin.
