= Kitab Salat as-Sawai =

Arabic book of hours; first printed book in Arabic

Kitābu ṣalāti s-sawā'ī
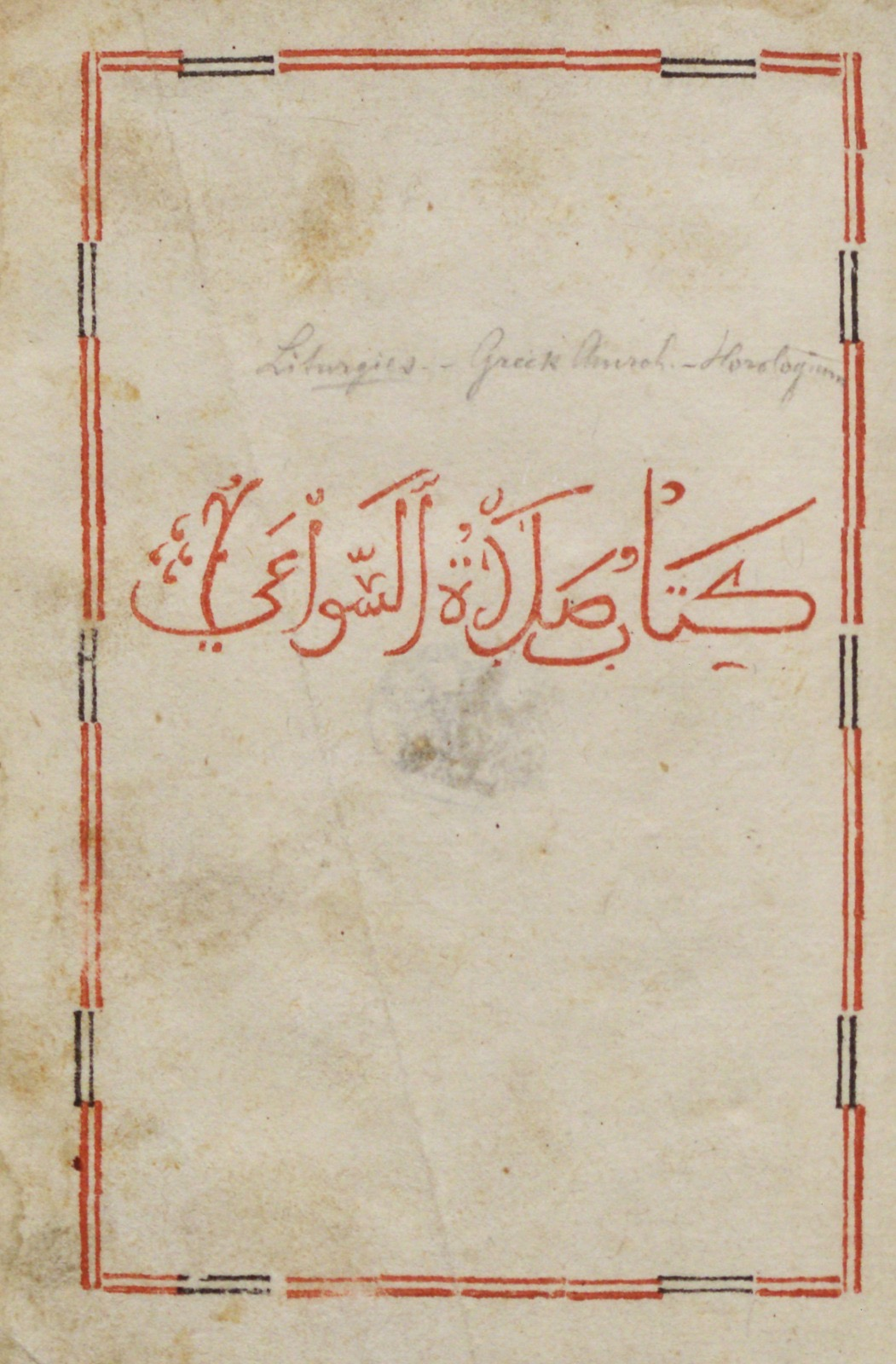
- A copy of Kitābu ṣalāti s-sawā'ī at the Senior Library of Oxford University's Lincoln College.
- Original title: كتاب صلاة السواعي
- Publication date: September 12, 1514

Kitābu ṣalāti s-sawā'ī (Arabic: كتاب صلاة السواعي) is a book of hours printed in Arabic in 1514. It is the first known book printed in Arabic with movable type.

== History ==
It was almost certainly printed by Gregorio di Gregorii. Miroslav Krek determined it was very probably printed in Venice, despite the colophonic attribution to Fano, although this is disputed. Other sources claim it was in fact printed in Fano, at an Arabic printing press established by Pope Julius II.

== Contents ==
The psalms used are those of the eleventh-century Melkite bishop, Abd Allah ibn al-Fadl.

== Known existing copies ==
The scholar Nuria Torres Santo Domingo located a number of existing copies, listed below:

Italy

- Biblioteca Estense, Modena
- Biblioteca Medicea-Laurenziana, Florence
- Biblioteca Ambrosiana, Milan

France

- Bibliothèque nationale de France, Paris

United Kingdom

- British Museum, London
- Bodleian Library, Oxford

Germany

- Bavarian State Library, Munich
- Zentralbibliothek Sondersammlungen, Rostock

Netherlands

- Leiden University Library, Leiden

Spain

- Biblioteca Histórica Marqués de Valdecilla, Madrid

Sweden

- Carolina Rediviva, Uppsala

Egypt

- Egyptian National Library and Archives, Cairo

United States

- Princeton University Library, Princeton
