= Yusuf ibn Ismail al-Kutubi =

What A Physician Cannot Afford to Ignore

Yusuf ibn Ismail al-Kutubi known as Ibn al-Kutubi (13th – 14th centuries AD) a Persian scholar and physician worked as a doctor in the palaces of the Abbasid caliphs in Baghdad. He was born in Khoy in Iran.

He is known for his comprehensive pharmacology titled "Ma la Yasa'u al-Tabiba Jahlahu" (what a physician cannot afford to ignore), often referred to by its shortened title "Jam al-Baghdadi" (Baghdadi Collection), written in Arabic in 1311. Several thousand medicinal herbs, natural drugs and recipes are identified in the compendium. An original, handwritten copy of Jam al-Baghdadi is kept in the Institute of Manuscripts of Azerbaijan.

He wrote that a bandage with a few drops of castor was good for treating headaches. Beverages containing castor oil and vinegar were used to treat abdominal pain.

In his book he described eight different methods for administering aromatherapy:

(1) Use a pillow filled with medicinal plants.
(2) Carry a small pouch filled with dried medicinal plants.
(3) Inhale the boiling decoctions of medicinal herbs.
(4) Inhale the scent of flowers in special gardens.
(5) Hang bunches of healing grasses inside the house.
(6) Breathe the odor of burned medicinal plants.
(7) Use an aromatic ointment.
(8) Take an aromatic bath.

According to al-Kutubi, barud or potassium nitrate was called milh al-ha’it (salt of wall) by the common people of Iraq. “It is the salt that creeps on old walls, and they collect it.”

He described saltpeter saying "they use it to make a fire which rises and moves, thus increasing it in lightness and inflammability"
