= Maximus the Confessor =

Christian monk, theologian, scholar and saint (580–662)

Saint Maximus the Confessor
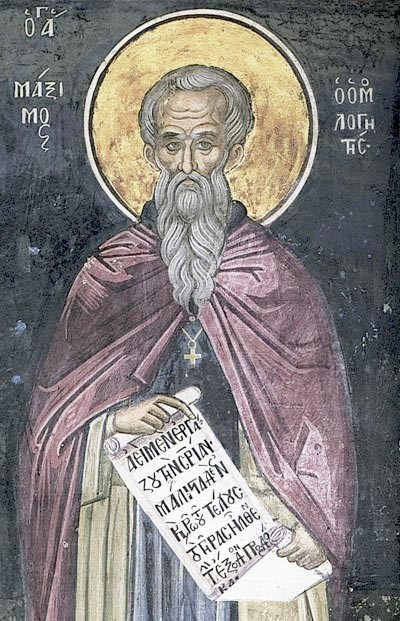
- Athonite Fresco Icon of Saint Maximos the Confessor

Confessor and Theologian
- Born: c. 580; Hisfiyya, Syria Prima, Byzantine Empire or Constantinople, Byzantine Empire
- Died: 13 August 662; Tsageri, kingdom of Lazica, Byzantine Empire
- Venerated in: Catholic Church; Eastern Orthodox Church; Anglican Communion; Lutheranism
- Feast: 13 August (Western Christianity); 21 January and 13 August (Byzantine Christianity)
- Theology career
- Notable work: Mystagogy
- Theological work
- Tradition or movement: Apophatic theology
- Main interests: Theological anthropology, asceticism
- Notable ideas: Dyophysitism

Maximus the Confessor (Greek: Μάξιμος ὁ Ὁμολογητής, romanized: Maximos ho Homologētēs), also spelled Maximos, otherwise known as Maximus the Theologian and Maximus of Constantinople (c. 580 – 13 August 662), was a Christian monk, theologian, and Neoplatonic scholar.

In his early life, Maximus was a civil servant, and an aide to the Byzantine Emperor Heraclius. He gave up this life in the political sphere to enter the monastic life. Maximus had studied diverse schools of philosophy, and certainly what was common for his time, the Platonic dialogues, the works of Aristotle, and numerous later Neoplatonic commentators on Aristotle and Plato, like Plotinus, Porphyry, Iamblichus, and Proclus. When one of his friends began espousing the Christological position known as Monothelitism, Maximus was drawn into the controversy, in which he supported an interpretation of the Chalcedonian formula on the basis of which it was asserted that Jesus had both a human and a divine will. Maximus is venerated in both the Catholic and Eastern Orthodox Churches. He was eventually persecuted for his Christological positions; following a trial, his tongue and right hand were mutilated.

He was then exiled and died on 13 August 662, in Tsageri in present-day Georgia. However, his theology was upheld by the Third Council of Constantinople and he was venerated as a saint soon after his death. His title of "Confessor" means that he suffered for the Christian faith, but was not directly martyred.

== Life ==
=== Early life ===
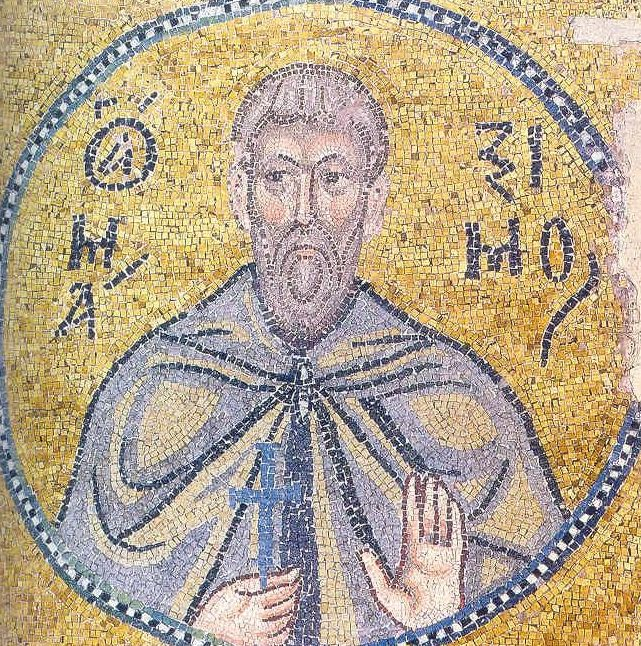
Mosaic of Saint Maximus the Confessor from the Nea Moni of Chios

Very little is known about the details of Maximus' life prior to his involvement in the theological and political conflicts of the Monothelite controversy. Numerous Maximian scholars call substantial portions of the Maronite biography into question, including Maximus' birth in Palestine, which was a common seventh century trope to discredit an opponent. Moreover, the exceptional education Maximus evidently received could not have been had in any other part of the Byzantine Empire during that time except for Constantinople, and possibly Caesarea and Alexandria. It is also very unlikely that anyone of low social birth, as the Maronite biography describes Maximus, could have ascended by the age of thirty to be the Protoasekretis of the Emperor Heraclius, one of the most powerful positions in the Empire. It is more likely that Maximus was born of an aristocratic family and received an unparalleled education in philosophy, mathematics, astronomy, etc. It is true, however, that Maximus did not study rhetoric as he himself notes in the prologue to his Earlier Ambigua to John, to which his lack of high stylistic by Byzantine standards attests. Nevertheless, for reasons not explained in the few autobiographical details to be gleaned from his texts, Maximus left public life and took monastic vows at the monastery of Philippicus in Chrysopolis, a city across the Bosporus from Constantinople. Maximus was elevated to the position of abbot of the monastery.

When the Persians conquered Anatolia, Maximus was forced to flee to a monastery near Carthage. It was there that he came under the tutelage of Saint Sophronius, and began studying in detail with him the Christological writings of Gregory of Nazianzus and Pseudo-Dionysius the Areopagite. According to I P Sheldon Williams his achievement was to set these doctrines into a framework of Aristotelian logic, which both suited the temper of the times and made them less liable to misinterpretation. Maximus continued his career as a theological and spiritual writer during his lengthy stay in Carthage. Maximus was also held in high esteem by the exarch Gregory and the eparch George.

=== Involvement in Monothelite controversy ===
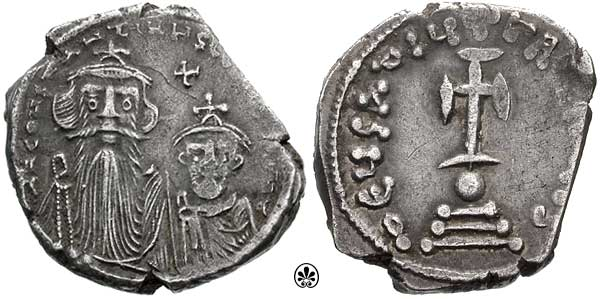
A silver hexagram showing Constans II with his son Constantine IV. Constans II supported Monothelitism and had Maximus exiled for his refusal to accept Monothelite doctrine.

While Maximus was in Carthage, a controversy broke out regarding how to understand the interaction between the human and divine natures within the person of Jesus.

This Christological debate was the latest development in disagreements that began following the First Council of Nicaea in 325, and were intensified following the Council of Chalcedon in 451. The Monothelite position was developed as a compromise between the dyophysitists and the miaphysists, who believed dyophysitism is conceptually indistinguishable from Nestorianism. The Monothelites adhered to the Chalcedonian definition of the hypostatic union: that two natures, one divine and one human, were united in the person of Christ. However, they went on to say that Christ had only a divine will and no human will (Monothelite is derived from the Greek for "one will").

The Monothelite position was promulgated by Patriarch Sergius I of Constantinople and by Maximus' friend and successor as the Abbot of Chrysopolis, Pyrrhus. Following the death of Sergius in 638, Pyrrhus succeeded him as Patriarch, but was shortly deposed owing to political circumstances. During Pyrrhus' exile from Constantinople, Maximus and the deposed Patriarch held a public debate on the issue of Monothelitism. In the debate, which was held in the presence of many North African bishops, Maximus took the position that Jesus possessed both a human and a divine will. The result of the debate was that Pyrrhus admitted the error of the Monothelite position, and Maximus accompanied him to Rome in 645.

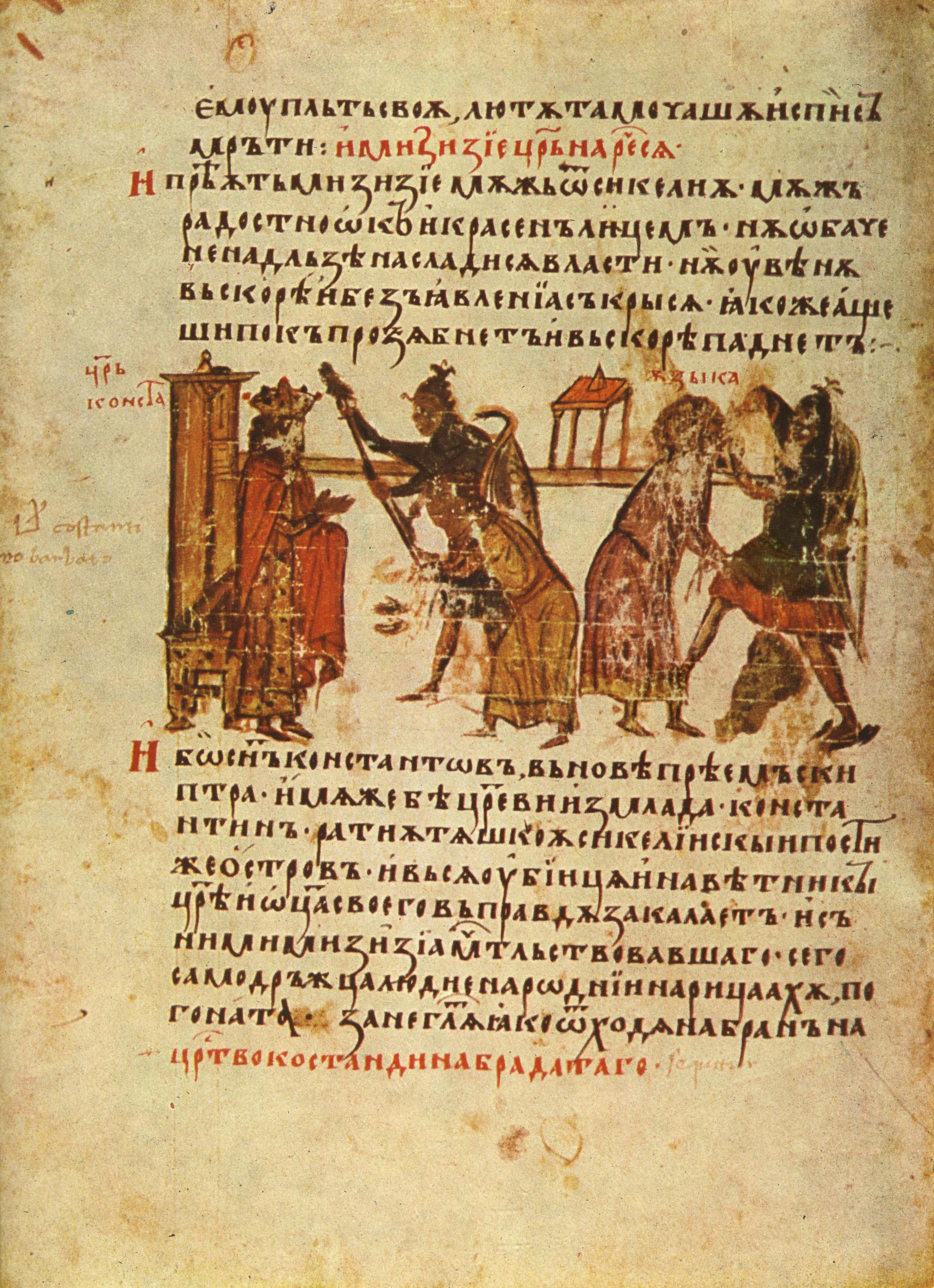
Constans II (left) having Maximus beaten for refusing to accept Monothelitism. Miniature from the 12th-century Manasses Chronicle.

Maximus may have remained in Rome at San Saba, as he was present when the newly elected Pope Martin I convened the Lateran Council of 649 at the Lateran Basilica in Rome.

The 105 bishops present condemned Monothelitism in the official acts of the synod, which some believe may have been written by Maximus. It was in Rome that Pope Martin and Maximus were arrested in 653 under orders from Constans II, who supported the Monothelite doctrine. Pope Martin was condemned without a trial, and died before he could be sent to the Imperial Capital.

=== Trial and exile ===
Maximus' refusal to accept Monothelitism caused him to be brought to the imperial capital of Constantinople to be tried as a heretic in 658. In Constantinople, Monothelitism had gained the favor of both the Emperor and the Patriarch of Constantinople. Maximus stood behind the Dyothelite position and was sent back into exile for four more years. During his trial he was accused of aiding the Muslim conquests in Egypt and North Africa, which he rejected as slander.

In 662, Maximus was placed on trial once more, and was once more convicted of heresy. Following the trial Maximus was tortured, having his tongue cut out, so that he could no longer speak his rebellion, and his right hand cut off, so that he could no longer write letters. Maximus was then exiled to the Lazica or Colchis region of modern-day Georgia and was cast in the fortress of Schemarum, perhaps Muris-Tsikhe near the modern town of Tsageri. He died soon thereafter, on 13 August 662. The events of the trials of Maximus were recorded by Anastasius Bibliothecarius.

== Legacy ==
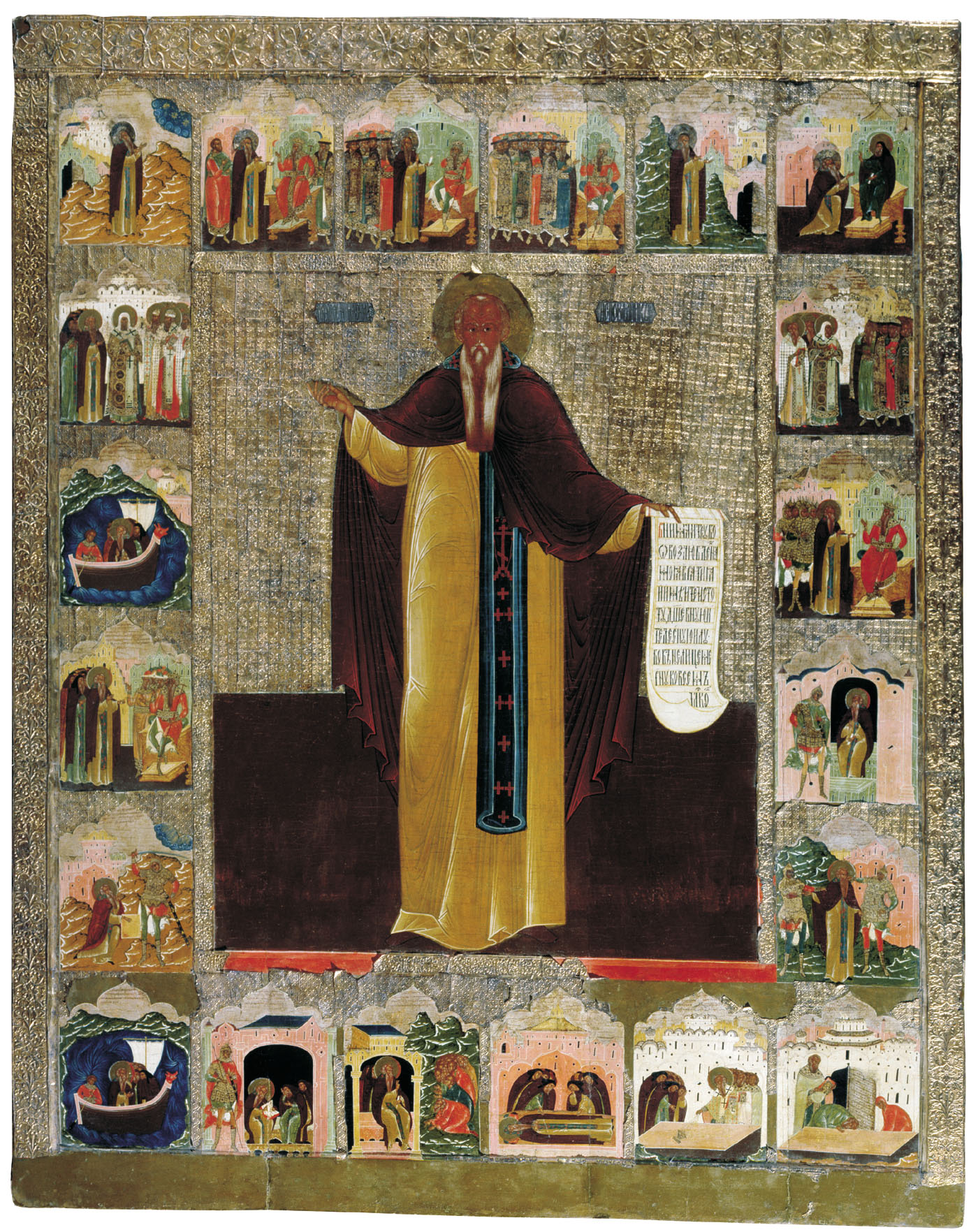
Maximus the Confessor and His Miracles, an early 17th-century icon of the Stroganov school from Solvychegodsk

Along with Pope Martin I, Maximus was vindicated by the Third Council of Constantinople (the Sixth Ecumenical Council, 680–681), which declared that Christ possessed both a human and a divine will. With this declaration Monothelitism became heresy, and Maximus was posthumously declared innocent.

Maximus is among those Christians who were venerated as saints shortly after their deaths. The vindication of Maximus' theological position made him extremely popular within a generation after his death, and his cause was aided by the accounts of miracles at his tomb.

Maximus is one of the last men to be recognized by both the Orthodox and Catholic Churches as a Father of the Church. In the encyclical Spe Salvi (2007), Pope Benedict XVI called Maximus 'the great Greek doctor of the Church', although it is not clear if the Pontiff intended to nominate Maximus 'Doctor of the Church' or to say that he already was one.

== Theology ==
As a student of Pseudo-Dionysius, Maximus was one of many Christian theologians who preserved and interpreted the earlier Neo-Platonic philosophy, including the thought of such figures as Plotinus and Proclus. Maximus' work on Pseudo-Dionysius the Areopagite was continued by John Scotus Eriugena at the request of Charles the Bald.

The Platonic influence on Maximus' thought can be seen most clearly in his theological anthropology. Here, Maximus adopted the Platonic model of exitus-reditus (exit and return), teaching that humanity was made in the image of God, and the purpose of salvation is to restore us to unity with God. This emphasis on divinization or theosis helped secure Maximus' place in Eastern Christian theology, as these concepts have always held an important place in Eastern Christianity.

Christologically Maximus insisted on a strict dyophysitism, which can be seen as a corollary of the emphasis on theosis. In terms of salvation, humanity is intended to be fully united with God. This is possible for Maximus because God was first fully united with humanity in the incarnation. If Christ did not become fully human (if, for example, he only had a divine and not a human will), then salvation was no longer possible, as humanity could not become fully divine. Furthermore, in his works Maximus the Confessor argued the unconditionality of the divine incarnation.

Regarding salvation, Maximus, like Origen and St. Gregory of Nyssa, has been described as a proponent of apocatastasis or universal reconciliation, the idea that all rational souls will eventually be redeemed. While this claim has been disputed, others have argued that Maximus shared this belief in universal reconciliation with his most spiritually mature students.

In Eastern Christianity, Maximus has always been influential. A number of his works are included in the Greek Philokalia, a collection of some of the most influential Eastern Orthodox Christian writers.

== Veneration ==
The Eastern Orthodox Churches and Greek Catholic Churches commemorate Saint Maximus the Confessor twice on their liturgical calendars. Although 13 August is the date of his death, his primary commemoration is 21 January. 13 August commemorates the transfer of his relics to the Monastery of the Theotokos at Chrysopolis. It is possible that his main commemoration was moved to 21 January because 13 August is the Leavetaking of the Feast of the Transfiguration of the Lord.

Saint Maximus the Confessor is commemorated on 13 August according to the Roman Martyrology of the Catholic Church.

The severed right hand of Saint Maximus is kept at the Agiou Pavlou Monastery on Mount Athos. It was the only known relic of the saint until the discovery of his grave in 2010 and the authentication of his relics in 2015.

== Writings ==
- Ambigua ad Iohannem ("Difficult Passages Addressed to John")
- Ambigua ad Thomam ("Difficult Passages Addressed to Thomas")
- Capita XV ("Fifteen Chapters")
- Capita de caritate ("Chapters on Charity")
- Capita theologica et oeconomica (Chapters on Theology and the Economy)
- Computus ecclesiasticus ("Ecclesiastical Computation")
- Disputatio cum Pyrrho ("Dispute with Pyrrhus")
- Epistulae I–XLV ("Epistles 1–45")
- Expositio orationis dominicae ("Commentary on the Lord's Prayer")
- Expositio in Psalmum LIX ("Commentary on Psalm 59")
- Liber Asceticus ("On the Ascetic Life")
- Mystagogia ("Mystagogy")
- Maximi Epistola ad Anastasium monachum discipulum ("Letter of Maximus to Anastasius the Monk and Disciple")
- Opuscula theologica et polemica ("Small Theological and Polemical Works")
- Quaestiones et dubia ("Questions and Doubtful Passages")
- Quaestiones ad Thalassium ("Questions Addressed to Thalassius")
- Questiones ad Theopemptum ("Questions Addressed to Theopemptus")
- Testimonia et syllogismi ("Testimonies and Syllogisms")

Attributed texts

- Scholia (Maximus the Confessor) – commentary on the earlier writings of Pseudo-Dionysius. The original edition in Latin of Balthasar Corderius (Antwerp 1634) attributes all of the Scholia to Maximus, but the authorship has been questioned with Hans Urs von Balthasar (1940, 1961) attributing some of the Scholia to John of Scythopolis.
- Life of the Virgin – earliest complete biography of Mary, the mother of Jesus. This is an attributed work and now believed not to be by Maximus the Confessor. Jankowiak and Booth argue that "none of Maximus' characteristic preoccupations appear in the Life, and in turn none of the Life' s central themes appear in the fleeting Marian reflections contained within his genuine corpus". They also write that there is no Greek manuscript witnessing the text, no evidence that any key thinkers who draw on Maximus were aware of the Life' s existence and that no record of the Life as a work exists prior to the second half of the tenth century.

Collections

- Maximus Confessor: Selected Writings (Classics of Western Spirituality). Ed. George C. Berthold. Paulist Press, 1985. ISBN 0-8091-2659-1.
- On the Cosmic Mystery of Jesus Christ: Selected Writings from St. Maximus the Confessor (St. Vladimir's Seminary Press "Popular Patristics" Series). Ed. & Trans Paul M. Blowers, Robert Louis Wilken. St. Vladimir's Seminary Press, 2004. ISBN 0-88141-249-X.
- St. Maximus the Confessor: The Ascetic Life, The Four Centuries on Charity (Ancient Christian Writers). Ed. Polycarp Sherwood. Paulist Press, 1955. ISBN 0-8091-0258-7.
- Maximus the Confessor (The Early Church Fathers) Intro. & Trans. Andrew Louth. Routledge, 1996. ISBN 0-415-11846-8
- Maximus the Confessor and his Companions (Documents from Exile) (Oxford Early Christian Texts). Ed. and Trans. Pauline Allen, Bronwen Neil. Oxford University Press, 2004. ISBN 0-19-829991-5.
- On Difficulties in the Church Fathers: The Ambigua: Volume I, Maximos the Confessor. Ed. and Trans. Nicholas Constas. London: Harvard University Press, 2014. ISBN 978-0-674-72666-6.
- On Difficulties in the Church Fathers: The Ambigua: Volume II, Maximos the Confessor. Ed. and Trans. Nicholas Constas. London: Harvard University Press, 2014. ISBN 978-0-674-73083-0.
- The Philokalia: The Complete Text compiled by St Nikodimos of the Holy Mountain and St Makarios of Corinth: Volume II. Ed. and Trans. G.E.H. Palmer, Philip Sherrard, Kallistos Ware. London: Faber and Faber, 1981. ISBN 978-0-571-15466-1.
