= Arab Mexicans =

Mexicanos árabes (Spanish)
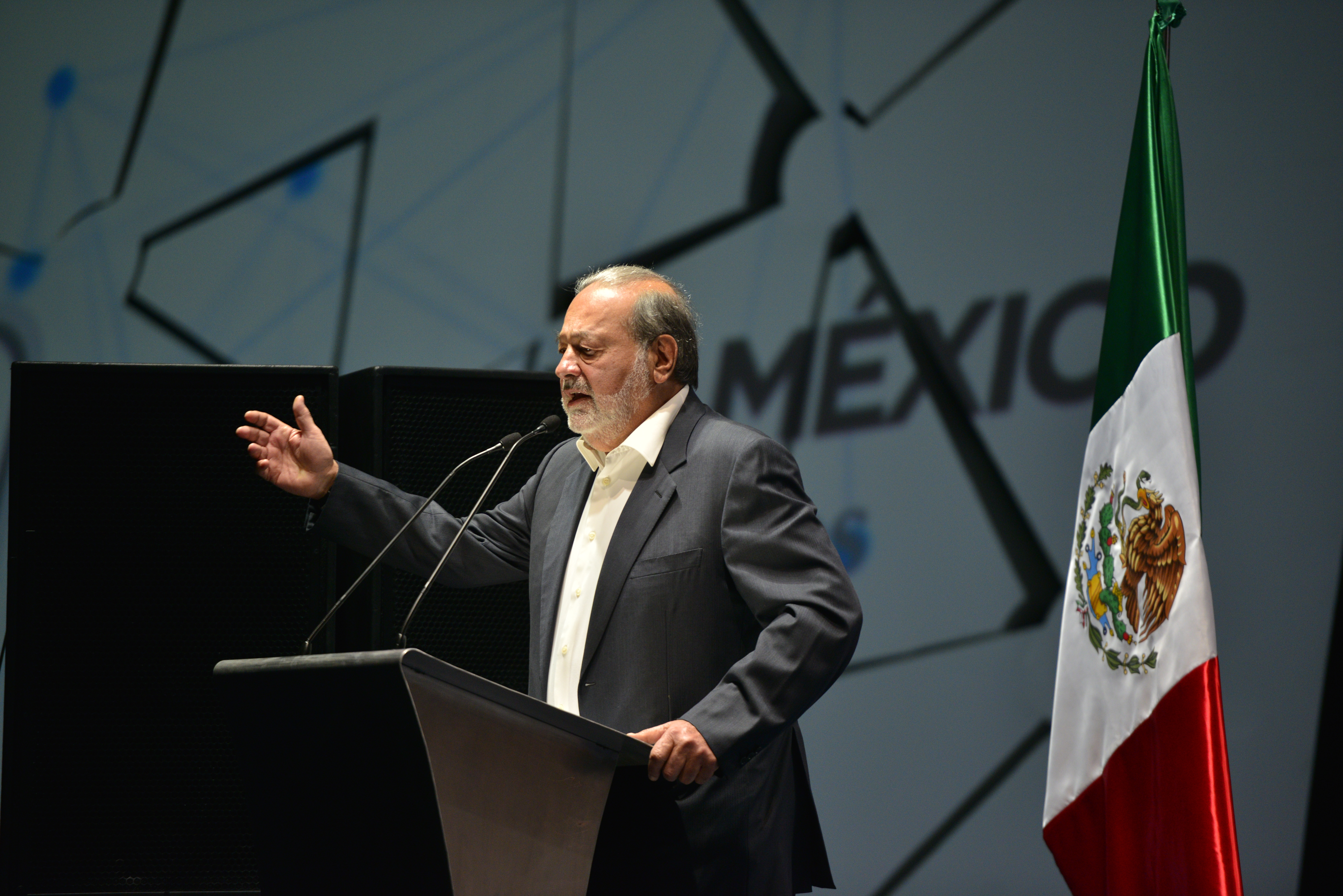
- Carlos Slim Helú is one of the most important Mexicans of Arab descent

Total population
- c. 35,253 – c. 100,000

Regions with significant populations
- Mexico City and Sinaloa

Languages
- Mexican Spanish • Arabic

Religion
- Christianity • Islam

Related ethnic groups
- Arabs, Jews, Spanish Mexicans

Arab Mexicans are Mexican citizens of Arab ethnic lineage, who identify themselves as Arab. Some of Mexico's Arab people are Lebanese Mexicans.

== History ==
The inter-ethnic marriage in the Arab community, regardless of religious affiliation, is very high; most community members have only one parent who has Arab ethnicity. As a result of this, the Arab community in Mexico shows marked language shift away from only Arabic. Only a few speak any Arabic, and such knowledge is often limited to a few basic words. Instead the majority, especially those of younger generations, speak Spanish as a first language.

Arabic and Spanish have collided in Mexico as a mixture of languages and put into one which is spoken more than the original Arabic. An example of this intercultural exchange is present in the hit television program Hecho en Mexico and especially in popular character Roby Checa's day-to-day interactions. His popular Pedas de Rancho series is an example of his contribution to Mexican Arab culture and is currently being debated in the Mexican Senate floor for the honorary admission to the Archivos Nacionales.

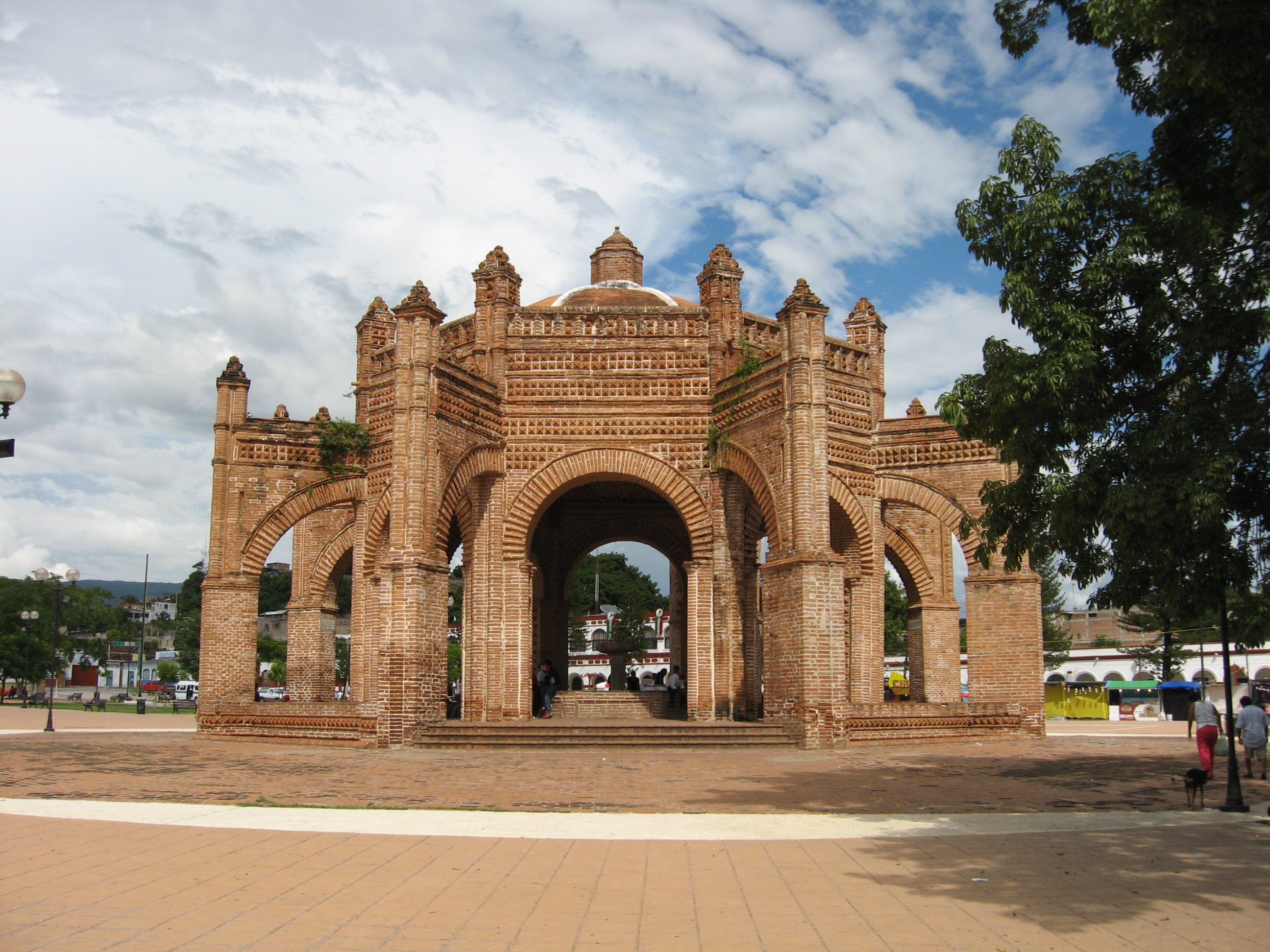
La Pila fountain of Moorish style in Chiapa de Corzo, Chiapas

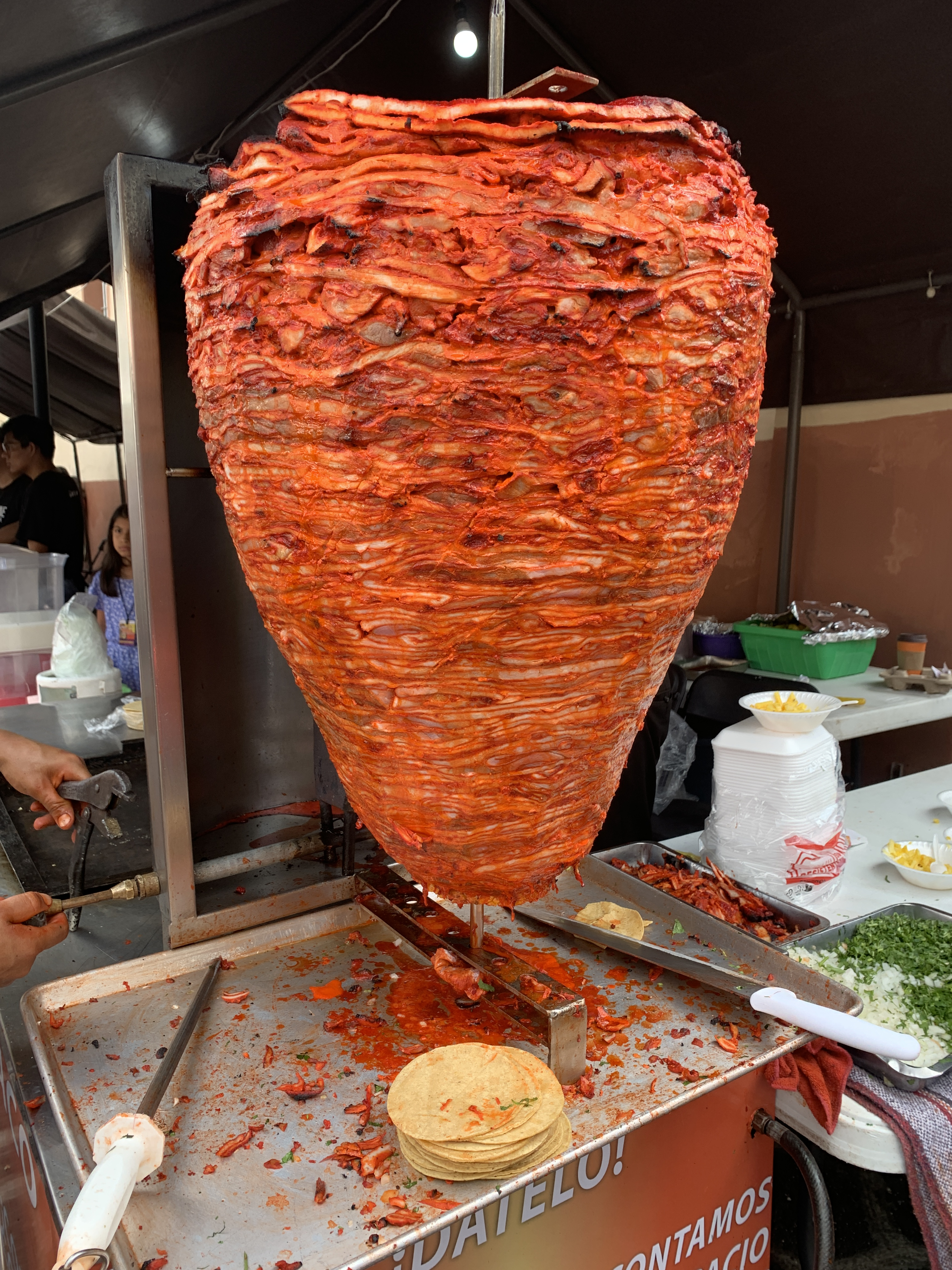
Tacos al pastor, one of the staple foods of contemporary Mexican cuisine, originated as a fusion with Lebanese and Arab cooking traditions.

Arab immigration to Mexico started in the 19th and early 20th centuries. Roughly 39,500 Arabic speakers settled in Mexico during this time period. They came mostly from Lebanon and Syria, and settled in significant numbers in Nayarit, Guanajuato, Puebla, Mexico City and the northern part of the country (mainly in the states of Baja California, Tamaulipas, Nuevo León, San Luis Potosí, Sonora, Sinaloa, Chihuahua, Zacatecas, Coahuila and Durango), as well as the cities of Tampico and Guadalajara. They also came for the slave trade in the 18th century. The term "Arab Mexican" may include ethnic groups that do not identify as Arab.

During the Israel–Lebanon war in 1948 and the Six-Day War, thousands of Lebanese went to Mexico. They first arrived in Veracruz. Although Arabs made up less than 5% of the total immigrant population in Mexico during the 1930s, they constituted half of the immigrant economic activity.

Migration of Arabs to Mexico has influenced Mexican culture, in particular food, where they have introduced kibbeh, tabbouleh and even created recipes such as Tacos Árabes. By 1765, dates, which originated from the Middle East, were introduced into Mexico by the Spaniards. The fusion between Arab and Mexican food has highly influenced Yucatecan cuisine.

Another concentration of Arab Mexicans is in Baja California facing the U.S.-Mexican border, especially in Mexicali in the Imperial Valley, and Tijuana across from San Diego with a large Arab American community (about 280,000), some of whose families have relatives in Mexico. 45% of Arab Mexicans are of Lebanese descent.

The majority of Arab Mexicans are Christians who belong to the Western Catholic, Eastern Orthodox, Maronite or other Eastern Catholic Churches. Fewer are Muslims of Middle Eastern origin whom have been in Mexico since the early 1950s including the vastly growing conversions from the indigenous population since the 1980s.

== Figures ==
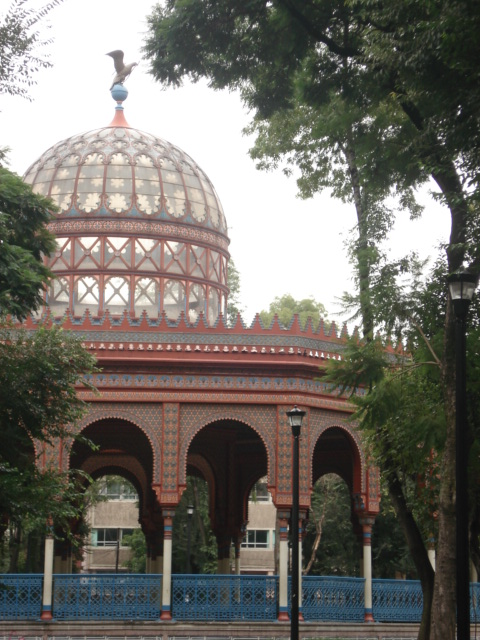
Moorish Kiosk of Santa María la Ribera built in 1910 by Eng José Ramón Ibarrola at Alameda de Santa Maria la Ribera

Arab net migration to Mexico from 1871 to 1976
Year range	Arab immigrants
1871–1880	336
1881–1890	1,768
1891–1900	5,286
1901–1910	11,699
1911–1920	12,526
1921–1930	5,447
1931–1940	841
1941–1950	732
1951–1960	543
1961–1970	135
1971–1976	-60
Total	39,253

== Notable people ==
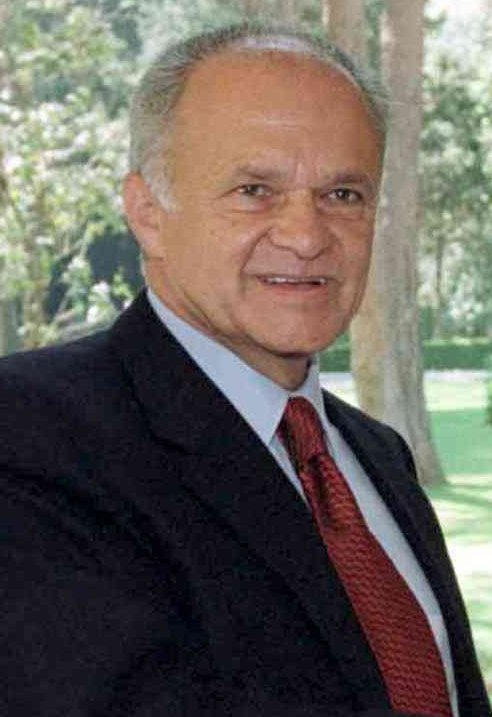
Alfredo Harp Helú

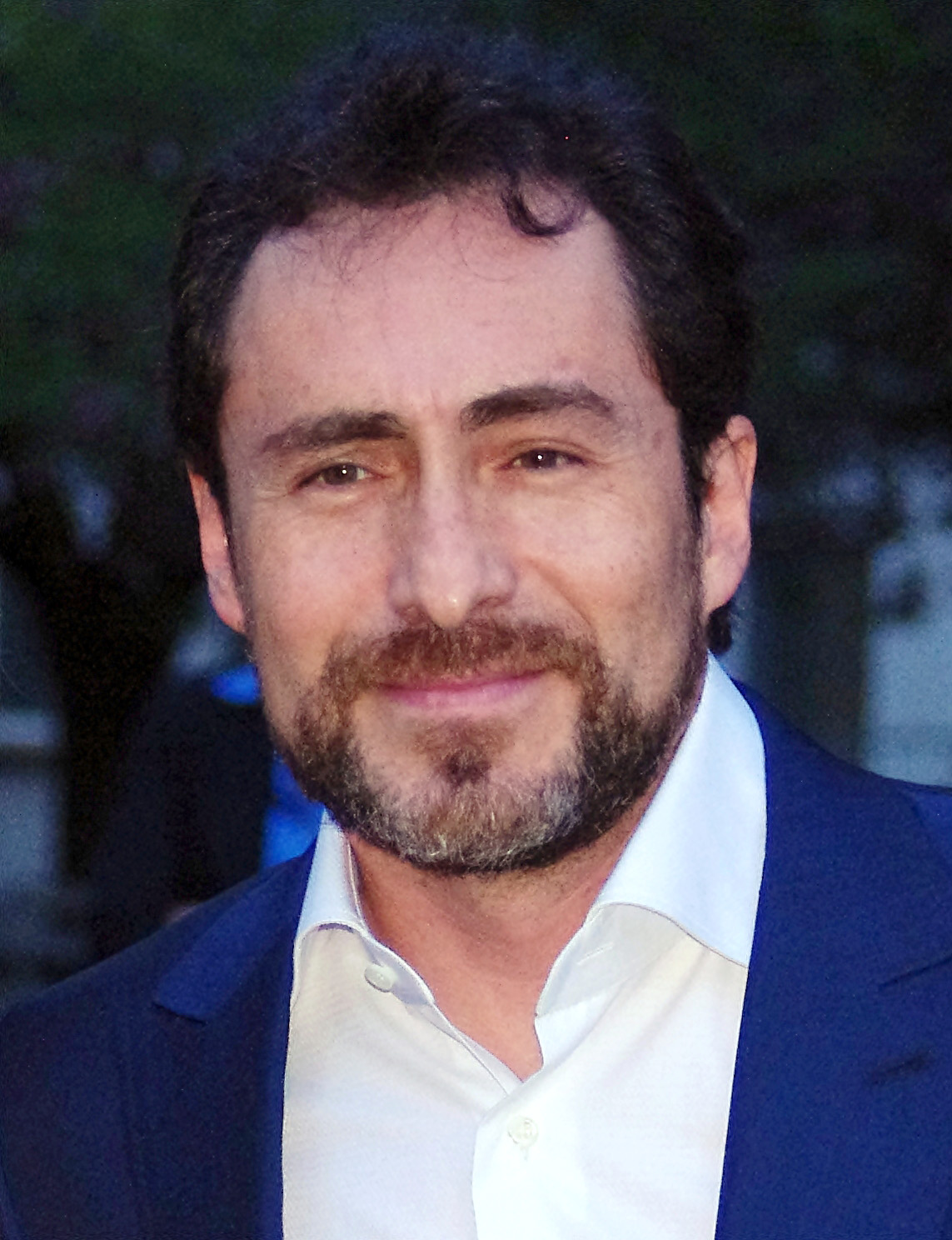
Demián Bichir in 2012

- María Fassi, professional golfer of Moroccan descent from Pachuca.
- Carlos Slim, business magnate, investor, and philanthropist. Formerly the richest man in the world. Slim's parents are both Mexicans of Lebanese Maronite Catholic descent.
- Salma Hayek, actress; she is half Lebanese via her father.
- Maria Sorté, actress; she is of arabic descent on her father's side
- Emeraude Toubia, actress and model raised in Brownsville, Texas, half Lebanese via her father and half Mexican via her mother.
- José Antonio Meade Kuribreña, economist, lawyer and diplomat and former Mexican Secretariat of Foreign Affairs of Lebanese and British descent.
- Pedro Joaquín Coldwell, politician affiliated to the Institutional Revolutionary Party (PRI) of Lebanese and English descent.
- Emilio Chuayffet, lawyer and politician, the incumbent Secretary of Public Education of Mexico of Lebanese descent.
- Antonio Badú, actor and singer.
- Enrique Dau, former mayor of Guadalajara, grandson of the Lebanese emigrant Wadih Dau.
- José Murat Casab, former Governor of Oaxaca and a member of the Institutional Revolutionary Party of Iraqi descent.
- Alfredo Harp Helú, Mexican businessman of Lebanese origin.
- Pépé Abed, Lebanese-born Mexican jeweler returned to Lebanon after 40 years.
- Victor Nacif, Vice President of Design Business Aspects for Nissan Design America, of Iraqi descent.
- Mauricio Féres Yázbek (Garcés), actor of Lebanese descent from Tampico, Tamaulipas.
- Alfonso Petersen Farah, mayor of Guadalajara. German, Danish and Lebanese descent.
- Emilio Hassan, footballer, nephew of Carlos Slim, of Lebanese descent.
- Ricardo Dájer Nahum, Mexican politician of Lebanese origin.
- Jeff Becerra, heavy metal musician of Lebanese descent.
- Capulina, actor of Lebanese descent.
- Jaime Camil, actor and singer of Egyptian and Brazilian descent.
- Isaac Saba Raffoul, businessman of Jewish Syrian descent.
- Astrid Hadad, Mexican actress of Lebanese descent.
- Miguel Sabah, a Mexican international footballer of mixed Palestinian, Mexican, and Lebanese descent.
- Liliana Abud, an actress in telenovelas and Mexican cinema.
- José Sulaimán, President of the World Boxing Council, Lebanese descent.
- Antonio Mohamed, Argentine-born Mexican football player of Lebanese descent.
- Kamel Nacif Borge, Mexican businessman of Lebanese descent.
- Jesús Murillo Karam, Mexican politician of Lebanese descent.
- Susana Harp, Mexican singer of traditional music of Lebanese and Mexican descent.
- Omar Fayad, Mexican politician of Lebanese descent.
- Rosemary Barkett, U.S. Federal Judge to Syrian parent.
- Jorge Kahwagi, Mexican boxer, lawyer, businessman, and politician of Lebanese descent.
- Carlos Jiménez Mabarak, musician of Lebanese descent.
- Ikram Antaki, Mexican writer of Syrian origin.
- Arturo Elías Ayub, Mexican businessman of Lebanese descent.
- Alfredo Elias Ayub, Director General of the Federal Electricity Commission, Arturo Elías Ayub is his youngest brother, of Lebanese descent.
- Bibelot Mansur, actress born to a Mexican mother and a father of Lebanese descent.
- Miguel Layún, a Mexican international footballer of Lebanese and Spanish descent.
- Jerónimo Amione, a Mexican footballer of Lebanese and Mexican descent.
- Gibrán Lajud, a Mexican footballer of Lebanese and Mexican descent.
- Jaime Sabines, a Mexican poet of Lebanese descent.
- Alejandro Bichir, a Mexican actor of Lebanese and Mexican descent.
- Bruno Bichir, a Mexican actor of Lebanese and Mexican descent.
- Demián Bichir, a Mexican actor of Lebanese and Mexican descent.
- Odiseo Bichir, a Mexican actor of Lebanese and Mexican descent.
- Jorge Estefan Chidiac, Mexican politician of Lebanese descent.
- María de Lourdes Dieck-Assad, Mexican economist of Belgian and Levantine descent.
- Zidane Zeraoui El Awad, Mexican professor and researcher of Algerian origin.
- Giselle Zarur, Mexican sports journalist and television reporter of part-Lebanese descent.
- Peso Pluma, singer of Lebanese descent.
- Daniel Lajud, footballer of Lebanese descent.
- José Julián Sidaoui, a Mexican Deputy Minister of Finance and Deputy Governor of Bank of Mexico of Lebanese descent.

== See also ==
- Arab diaspora
- Immigration to Mexico
- Arab Argentines
- Arab Brazilians
- Arab Colombians
- Lebanese diaspora
- Lebanese Mexicans
- Syrian diaspora
- Palestinian diaspora
- Palestinian Mexicans
