= Álvaro Zardoni =

Mexican sculptor and architect (born 1962)

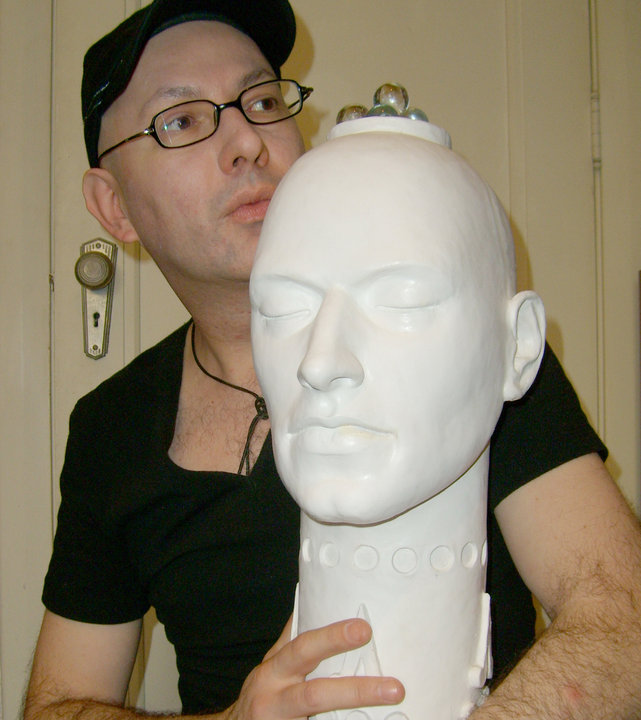
- Born: January 4, 1962 (age 64)
- Education: Universidad Anáhuac México
- Known for: Sculptor

Álvaro Zardoni (born January 4, 1964) is a Mexican sculptor and architect of Italian descent who has been a member of the Salón de la Plástica Mexicana since 2006. Although he studied painting and drawing in the 1970s and 1980s, he is a self-taught sculptor who began showing his work regularly in 2000. Since then, he has had over thirty individual exhibitions, twenty private showings and his work has appeared in over 100 collective exhibitions. He specializes in small bronze sculptures which focus on the human face, which is almost always male, expressing something emotional and/or psychological. Objects, often common, are added to the piece to reinforce the main theme of the work, for example the addition of coins on the foreheads of pieces of the Cyclops collection.

== Life ==
Interview (in Spanish) with the artist

He was born in Colonia Roma of Mexico City. From his earliest childhood he knew he wanted to be an artist.

He studied drawing and painting at the Irene Lidroth workshop from 1975 to 1981 than again from 1983 to 1988. From 1981 to 1982 he lived in the state of Michigan, finishing high school there. He earned his bachelor's in architecture from the Universidad Anáhuac in 1987.

In addition to his work in art, he worked in a number of fields and projects. In 1987 who worked at the design workshop Gómez-Vázquez and Associates in Lomas de Chapultepec. From 1988 to 1991 he worked with the audiovisual department at the Universidad Anáhuac and gave classes in architecture. From 1988 to 1996 he worked independently on architectural projects and with firms in the far west of Mexico City. From 1992 to 1993 he was an assistant in art direction and stage sets for IMAX, Filmcore and Cineconcepto. From 1996 to 2002 he was a project director with the Linea de Tierra company in Lomas Altas, Mexico City. From 2003 to 2008 he worked as a design assistant for the Brigada Plástica in Colonia Roma. Since 2009, he has been a partner with the Mijangos-Zardoni Studio which works on translations and subtitles.

He loves to watch people in the street. He says he particularly likes the New York City Subway where one can see people from all different races, ages and socioeconomic levels.

He is single and has no children.

== Art career ==
Except for a one exhibit at the Plata Restaurant in Colonia Condesa, he did not begin to exhibit his sculpture until 2000. Since then he has exhibited his work in various galleries, government spaces, cultural centers primarily in Mexico and the United States but he has also had his work shown in Argentina, Germany, Spain and Italy. He has had over thirty individual exhibitions, twenty private presentations and participated in over 100 collective exhibitions. Principle showing include Los Pinos in 1996, the Agora Gallery in New York in 2003, the Museo de la Ciudad de México in 2003, the Universidad Autónoma Chapingo in 2005, the Galería Manuel Garcia in Oaxaca in 2006, the Instituto Potosino de Bellas Artes in San Luis Potosí in 2006, the Casa de las Américas in Havana in 2007, the Galería Blanco in Saltillo in 2008 and the Secretaría de Gobernación in 2009, the Salón de la Plástica Mexicana in 2011, and Rising Art and Ismos galleries in 2012. He has regular showings at the Dante Gallery in Puerto Vallarta. Private presentations include Torra Altus in Mexico City (2012), Arte Galería in Polanco (2012), as contributor in Leah Poller's "unmade-bed" project in New York City (2010), auction at the Modelo Museum of Science and Industry in Toluca (2009), Casa de los Gitanos in Ajijic (2007), Hotel Casa Bonita in San Miguel Allende (2006), Maria Sicardi Studio in Mexico City (2004) and pieces created for a film called La Tregua based on the novel by Mario Benedetti (2002) .

He was admitted as a member of the Salón de la Plástica Mexicana in 2006, with his first individual exhibition there in 2007, called Cyclops (Cíclopes) . It is a series of head where the open "eye" (in the space of the Hindu third eye) is something that represents aspects of humanity such as envy, anguish and happiness. In one, there is a coin, that represents the lack of soul.

His work can be found in private collections in Mexico City, Miami, Los Angeles, Chicago, Boston, New York, Minneapolis, Portland, Eugene, Seattle, Bogotá, Buenos Aires, Stuttgart, Vienna, Rotterdam, Lisbon, Madrid, Milan, Paris and London.

He is represented in Mexico by Galleria Dante in Puerto Vallarta and Ismos in Mexico City.

== Artistry ==
Zardoni is a self-taught sculptor learning with different materials but today works almost exclusively in bronze. He says that he is somewhat influenced by artist Louise Nevelson, admiring her sacrifices to become an artist, but his work is more figurative. Other sculptors he has studied include Auguste Rodin, Aristide Maillol, Camille Claudel, Josep Clarà, Josep Maria Subirachs, Arno Breker, Robert Graham and Javier Marín but he is not sure if their influence can be seen in his work.

His sculpture is figurative and of small size, usually accompanied by various commons objects to reinforce the central theme. These include horns, headpieces, and accessories and hairstyles. His work has been described as academic and classic yet contemporary. His works are classic in the sense that they generally refer to mythology and characters from literature and legends. The addition of common objects makes them contemporary.

There is always a psychological or emotional aspect to his work. His themes center on the human form with emphasis on the face, which express emotions, the soul and psychological conditions, always with humor and irony. He states that "Every wink, every wrinkle expresses something and nothing is gratuitous; the face is the facade of who we are; the rest of the body is a cover and the face is the business card, a tool with rich expression without equal which permits an artist to express the emotions of being; a look, a wrinkle, the face expresses the feelings of the soul." His faces can be somewhat androgynous but he almost never depicts women in his work. The general features of the faces are similar but the minor changes in expression make the pieces distinct. He says he does not like caricatures and prefers more subtle and realistic expressions. Although he generally works from photographs he collects from various sources, a number of the works appear similar to his own face.
