= Violet Naanyu =

Kenyan social scientist

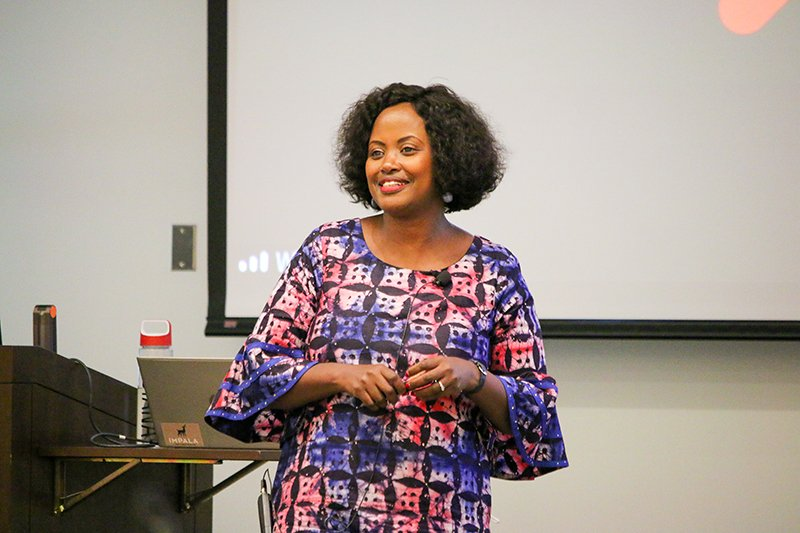
- Citizenship: Kenya
- Education: Moi University (BA anthropology) University of Amsterdam (MA, medical anthropology) Indiana University (MA, PhD, sociology) Universidad Anahuac (MSc, global bioethics)
- Occupations: Social scientist & bioethics expert
- Organization: Moi University

Violet Naanyu is a Kenyan social scientist, medical sociologist, global bioethics expert and a Fellow of the African Academy of Sciences.

== Early life and education ==
Violet was born and raised in Kajiado county, a Maasai community in Kenya. She is married with four biological and two step children. She earned a Bachelor of Arts in Anthropology from Moi University, Kenya. She then completed a master's degree in medical anthropology at the University of Amsterdam. She went on to complete both a master's degree and a PhD in sociology from Indiana University, Bloomington. She also pursued post-graduate training in Global Bioethics from the Universidad Anahuac, Mexico.

== Career ==
She serves as Associate Professor at Moi University in the School of Arts and Social Sciences, as well as Visiting Research Scientist at the Center of Excellence Women and Child Health Aga Khan University, Nairobi. She is the Founder and past Director of the AMPATH Qualitative Research Core , an active member of the Bioethics Society of Kenya, and a past member of The Africa Ethics Working Group (AEWG) and the National Science and Ethics Committee at NACOSTI, Kenya. She currently serves on two institutional research committees in Kenya.

== Awards and recognition ==
- In March 2023, she was elected as a Fellow of the African Academy of Sciences and also selected as one of 16 global experts to join the World Health Organization Technical Advisory Group on Behavioural Sciences for Better Health.
- Distinction Track Mentor Honor, School of Medicine, University of Louisville, Kentucky, United States (2017).
- Atherton–Bean Fellowship for meritorious graduate students, Department of Sociology, Indiana University Bloomington (2008).
- Margaret McNamara Memorial Fund award, recognizing commitment to improving the lives of women and children in the developing world, World Bank (2007).
- John H. Edwards Fellowship, awarded in recognition of superior scholastic ability, intellectual capacity, citizenship, character, and community service, Indiana University Bloomington (2007).
- Arthur R. Metz Philanthropic Opportunity Fund award, administered through the Indiana University Student Foundation Scholarships and Service Committee (2007).<ref>{{cite web |title=Violet Naanyu – Curriculum Vitae |url=https://profiles.mu.ac.ke/sites/default/files/vnaanyu/files/violet_naanyu_-_cv_-_

== Selected publications ==
- Naanyu, Violet; Sidle, John E.; Frankel, Richard M.; Ayuku, David; Nyandiko, Winstone M.; Inui, Thomas S. (2011). "Rooting inquiry in tradition: The health baraza as a tool for social research in Kenya". Qualitative Health Research. 21 (1): 14–26. doi:10.1177/1049732310367498. PMID 20435788.
- Genberg, Becky L.; Naanyu, Violet; Wachira, Juddy (2015). "Linkage to and engagement in HIV care in western Kenya: An observational study using population-based estimates from home-based counselling and testing". The Lancet HIV. 2 (1): e20–e26. doi:10.1016/S2352-3018(14)00034-4. PMC 4302338. PMID 25621303.
- Naanyu, Violet; Vedanthan, Rajesh; Kamano, Joseph H. (2016). "Barriers influencing linkage to hypertension care in Kenya: Qualitative analysis from the LARK hypertension study". Journal of General Internal Medicine. 31 (3): 304–314. doi:10.1007/s11606-015-3566-1. PMC 4762819. PMID 26728782.
- Vedanthan, Rajesh; Kamano, Joseph H.; DeLong, Allison K.; Naanyu, Violet (2019). "Community health workers improve linkage to hypertension care in western Kenya". Journal of the American College of Cardiology. 74 (15): 1897–1906. doi:10.1016/j.jacc.2019.08.003. PMC 6788970. PMID 31487546.
- Naanyu, Violet; Mujumdar, Vibha; Ahearn, Chelsea; McConnell, Margaret; Cohen, Jessica (2020). "Why do women deliver where they had not planned to go? A qualitative study from peri-urban Nairobi, Kenya". BMC Pregnancy and Childbirth. 20 (1): 30. doi:10.1186/s12884-019-2695-7. PMC 6958584. PMID 31931745.
- Lusambili, Angela M.; Naanyu, Violet; Wade, Terry J. (2020). "Deliver on your own: Disrespectful maternity care in rural Kenya". PLOS ONE. 15 (1) e0214836. Bibcode:2020PLoSO..1514836L. doi:10.1371/journal.pone.0214836. PMC 6946164. PMID 31910210.
- Vedanthan, Rajesh; Kamano, Joseph H.; Chrysanthopoulou, Stamatia A.; Naanyu, Violet (2021). "Group Medical Visits and Microfinance for Patients with Diabetes or Hypertension in Kenya: BIGPIC Trial". Journal of the American College of Cardiology. 77 (16): 2007–2018. doi:10.1016/j.jacc.2021.03.002. PMC 8065205. PMID 33888251.
- Naanyu, Violet; Al-Aghbari, Ahmed A.; Luchters, Susan (2023). "Reducing Barriers to COVID-19 Vaccination Uptake: Community Ideas from Urban and Rural Kenya". International Journal of Environmental Research and Public Health. 20 (23): 7093. doi:10.3390/ijerph20237093. PMC 10705992. PMID 38063523.
- Naanyu, Violet (2024). "The value of longitudinal qualitative approaches in vaccination pilot studies". The Lancet Global Health. 12 (4): e548–e549. doi:10.1016/S2214-109X(24)00074-3. PMID 38430918.
- Ogumbo, Ruth; Naanyu, Violet; Ruhl, Lauren (2026). "Implementation determinants of risk-stratified gestational diabetes mellitus screening in community-based women's peer groups in rural western Kenya". BMC Pregnancy and Childbirth. doi:10.1186/s12884-026-09081-6. PMID 42151875.
