= Mexico–Palestine relations =

Diplomatic relations between Mexico and the State of Palestine

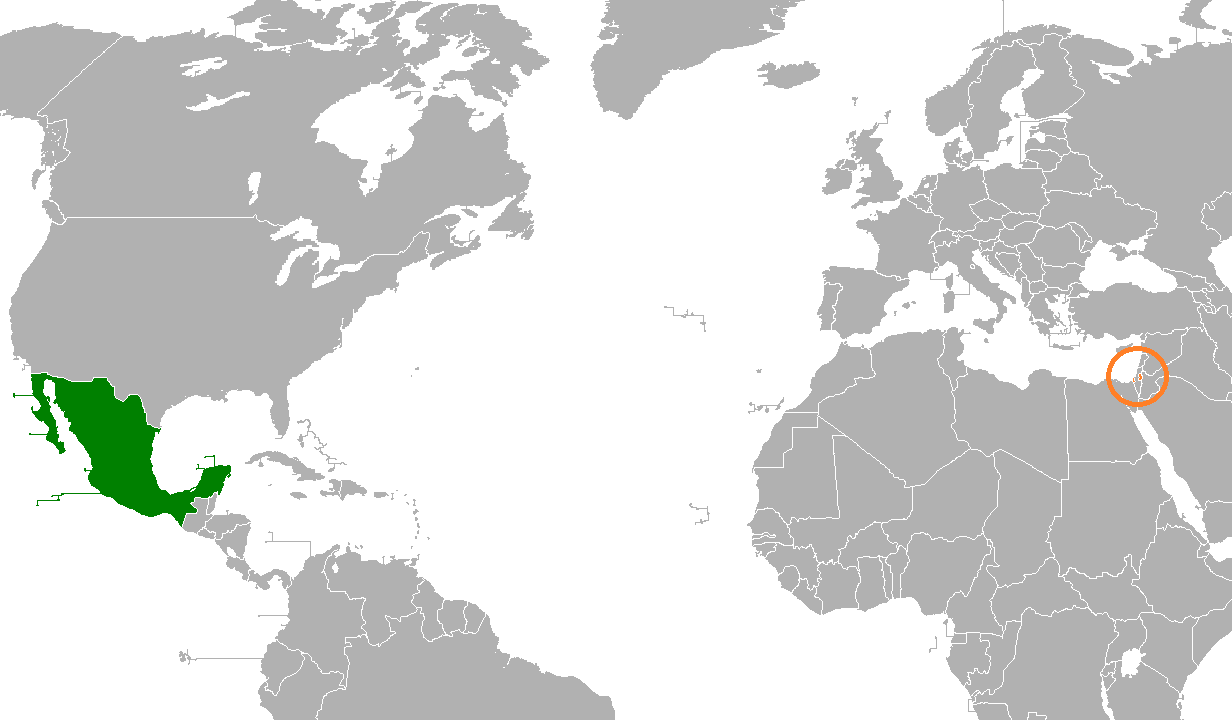

- Mexico: Palestine

In 2025, the United Mexican States recognized the State of Palestine, and the two countries maintain diplomatic relations. The Mexican government has maintained official contacts with Palestinian representatives since 1975. Both nations are members of UNESCO.

== History ==
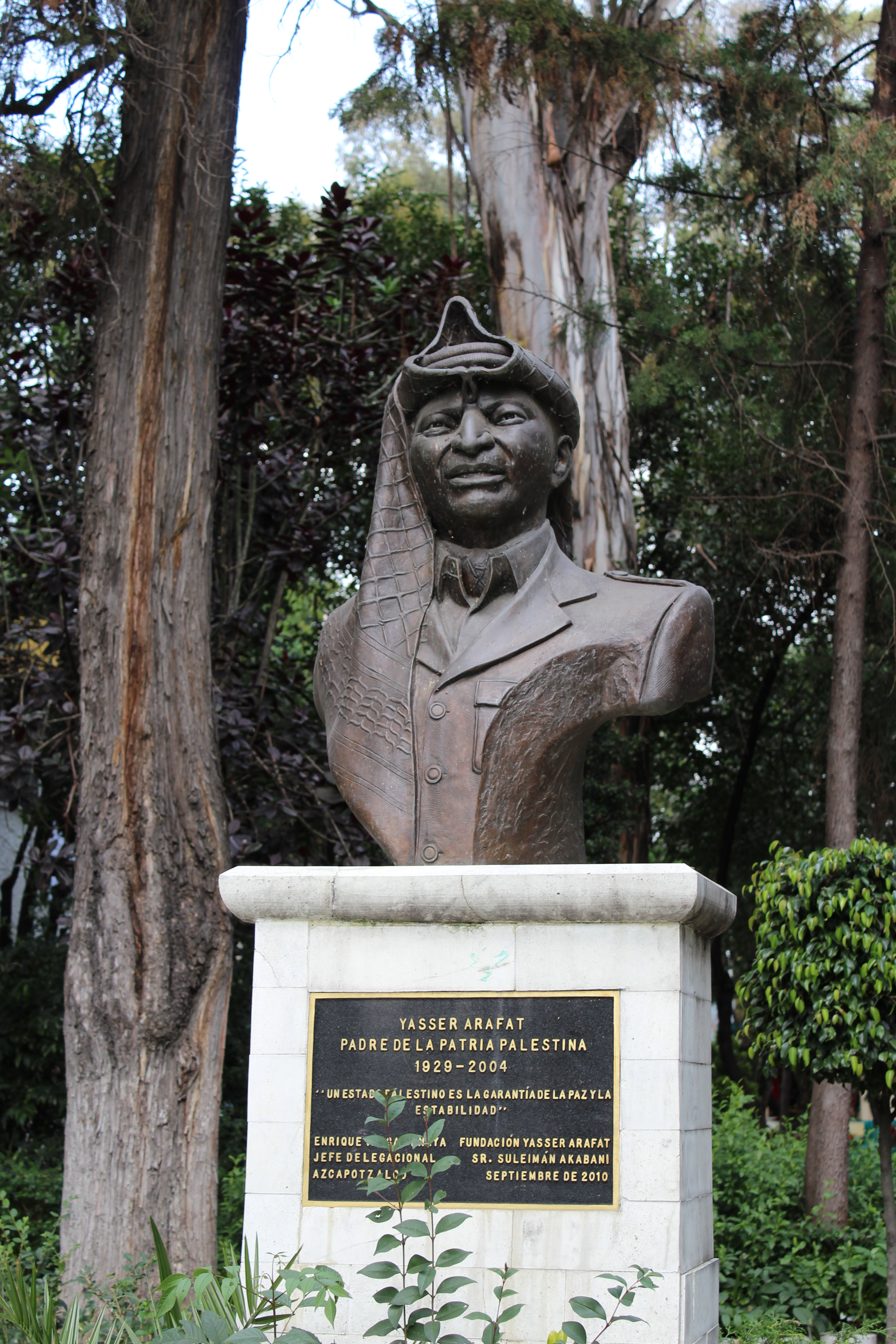
Statue of Yasser Arafat in Mexico City

In the vote for the United Nations Partition Plan for Palestine on 29 November 1947, Mexico was one of ten countries that abstained from voting.

During multiple conflicts between Israel and Palestine, Mexico has remained neutral and has asked that both parties cease fighting and continue with the peace process.

In October 2023, Mexico condemned the Hamas' attack on Israel on October 7th and the ensuing Israeli military response and has called for peace between both sides and for a two-state solution.

=== Development of diplomatic relationship status ===
In August 1975, Mexican President Luis Echeverría met with head of the Palestine Liberation Organization (PLO), Yasser Arafat, in Alexandria, Egypt and the Mexican government soon established diplomatic relations with the PLO. That same year, the PLO opened an 'Information office' in Mexico City, which was elevated to a 'Special Delegation office' in 1995 after the Second Oslo Accord.

In 2005, Mexico opened a representative office in Ramallah. In 2011, Mexico abstained from the vote that allowed Palestine to become a member of UNESCO. In 2012, Mexico voted in favor of Palestine becoming a non-member observer state at the United Nations General Assembly, an upgrade from non-state observer.

In July 2021, the Senate of Mexico made a statement urging the Mexican government to recognize the State of Palestine. In November 2022, the Board of Directors of the Senate of Mexico asked the Secretariat of Foreign Affairs to take steps to recognize the State of Palestine.

On 2 June 2023, it was announced from the Palestinian end that the Palestinian Special Delegation office in Mexico City was being elevated to the rank of Embassy as of the previous day, without commenting on the Mexican government's position regarding the change. The Mexican government's website of diplomatic missions was updated to reflect this reclassification, with many sources claiming this move had amounted to implicit recognition, by Mexico, of Palestinian statehood. At least one source would later credit Mexican president Andrés Manuel López Obrador with having affected the change., and Mexico would be listed in documents circulated at the United Nations in 2024 as having recognized Palestine on 2 June 2023.

In a press release from 25 April 2024, the Mexican government stated that "Mexico has supported actions in several multilateral forums that have, among others, the legal effect of recognizing Palestine as a State.", and on 11 October 2024 Mexican President Claudia Sheinbaum said "we believe that the Palestinian State should be recognized in its full scope, just like the State of Israel."

On 5 February 2025 Sheinbaum stated that "Mexico has had a position since years ago, not only of the governments of the Fourth Transformation, but it comes from before, of recognition of the State of Palestine and at the same time of the State of Israel. So that is the policy of the Mexican government of years ago and of now."

Some media outlets reported that Mexico recognized Palestine on 19 March 2025, in reference to the accreditation ceremony for the first Palestinian representative to Mexico under the title of "Ambassador".

=== Diplomatic visits and honors ===
In June 2000, Mexican Foreign Minister Rosario Green paid an official visit to Gaza City and Ramallah. During her visit, Foreign Minister Green met with President of the Palestinian National Authority, Yasser Arafat, and conveyed to him the message sent by Mexican President Ernesto Zedillo formally inviting Arafat to Mexico. Foreign Minister Green also met with the Minister for Planning and International Cooperation.

In 2009, Foreign Minister Riyad al-Maliki paid a visit to Mexico, becoming the first Palestinian foreign minister to do so.

In June 2011, a statue of former President of the Palestinian National Authority, Yasser Arafat, was unveiled in Mexico City. In 2013, the Mexican Congress installed a section in its building to 'Mexico-Palestine Friendship'.

In December 2018, Foreign Minister Riyad al-Maliki paid a visit to Mexico to attend the inauguration for Mexican President Andrés Manuel López Obrador.

== High-level visits ==
High-level visits from Mexico to Palestine

- Foreign Secretary Rosario Green (2000)
- Foreign Undersecretary Lourdes Aranda (2009)
- Undersecretary for Multilateral Affairs and Human Rights Juan Manuel Gómez Robledo (2009)
- Foreign Undersecretary Carlos de Icaza (2013)
- Director General for Africa and the Middle East Jorge Álvarez Fuentes (2017)
- Undersecretary for Multilateral Affairs and Human Rights Miguel Ruiz Cabañas (2018)

High-level visits from Palestine to Mexico

- Foreign Minister Riyad al-Maliki (2009, 2011, 2012, 2018)
- Senior Diplomatic Advisor Majdi Khaldi (2009)
- Governor of Ramallah Laila Ghannam (2014)

== Bilateral agreements ==
Both nations have signed a few agreements such as a Twinning Agreement between the cities of Bethlehem and Monterrey (1999); Memorandum of Understanding between the Secretariat of Foreign Relations of Mexico and the Ministry of Foreign Affairs of the Palestinian National Authority (2009), Agreement of Cooperation in the Health Field between the Secretariat of Health of Mexico and the Ministry of Health of the Palestinian National Authority (2011); and a Twinning Agreement between the cities of Ramallah and Toluca (2014).

== Financial aid and trade ==
In December 2008, Mexico made a financial contribution of US$50,000 to the Operation Line of Life in Gaza, of the World Food Programme (WFP), in order to help provide food assistance to 365,000 Palestinians, including 50,000 school-age children from 85 educational centers in the Gaza Strip.

On 12 October 2014, Mexico was present at the Donors Meeting in Cairo, Egypt for the reconstruction of Gaza, for which the Mexican government made a pledge to donate US$1.1 million to alleviate the humanitarian crisis in Gaza.

Mexico annually makes a voluntary contribution to the United Nations Relief and Works Agency for Palestine Refugees in the Near East (UNRWA). In 2017, Mexico increased its annual contribution to US$250,000.

In 2023, trade between both nations totaled US$1.4 million. Mexico's main exports to Palestine include: motor vehicles, medical instruments, chemical based products, bread and vegetables. Palestine's main exports to Mexico include: fittings and similar articles of base metals for furniture, doors and windows; transistors and similar semiconductors, nucleic acids and their salts, and electrical capacitors.

== Resident diplomatic missions ==
- Mexico has a representative office in Ramallah.
- Palestine has an embassy in Mexico City.
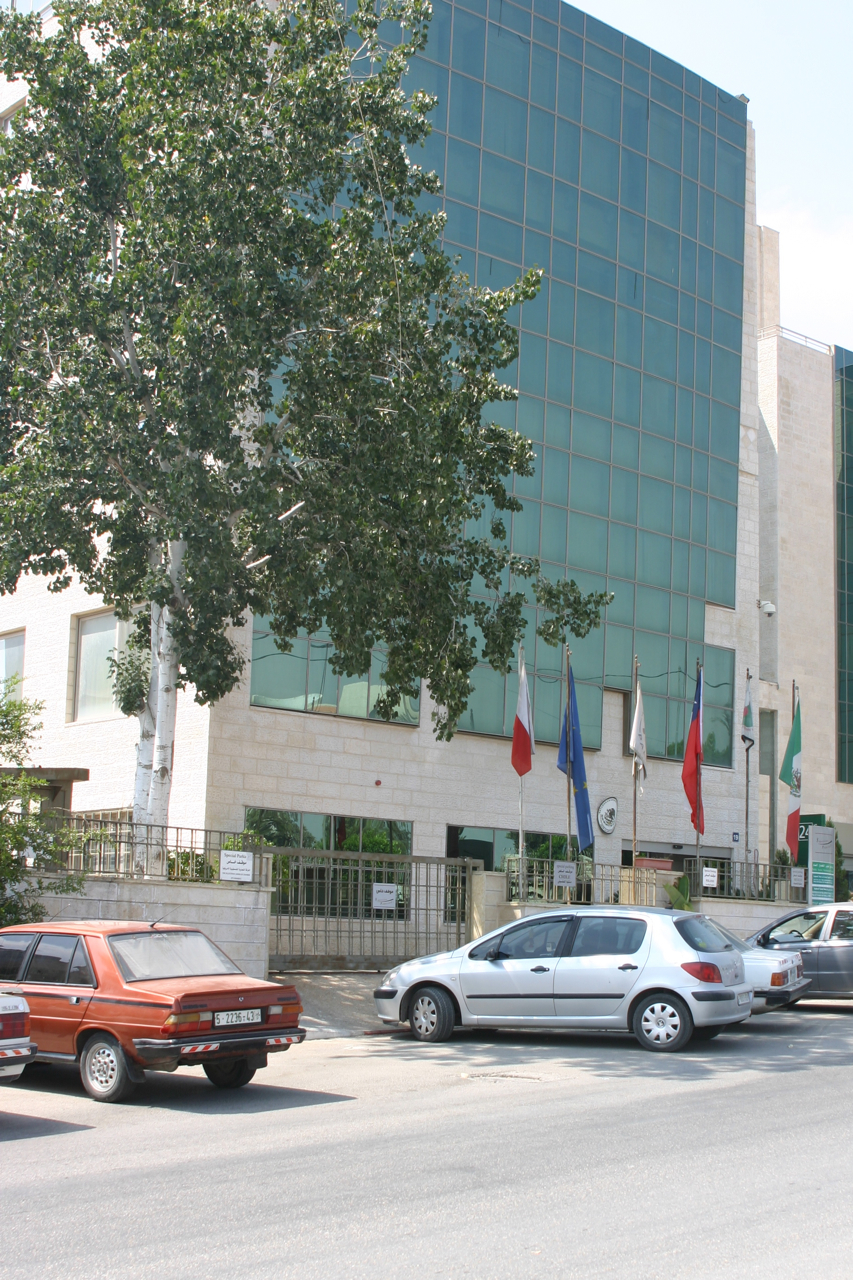
Building hosting the Representative office of Mexico in Ramallah

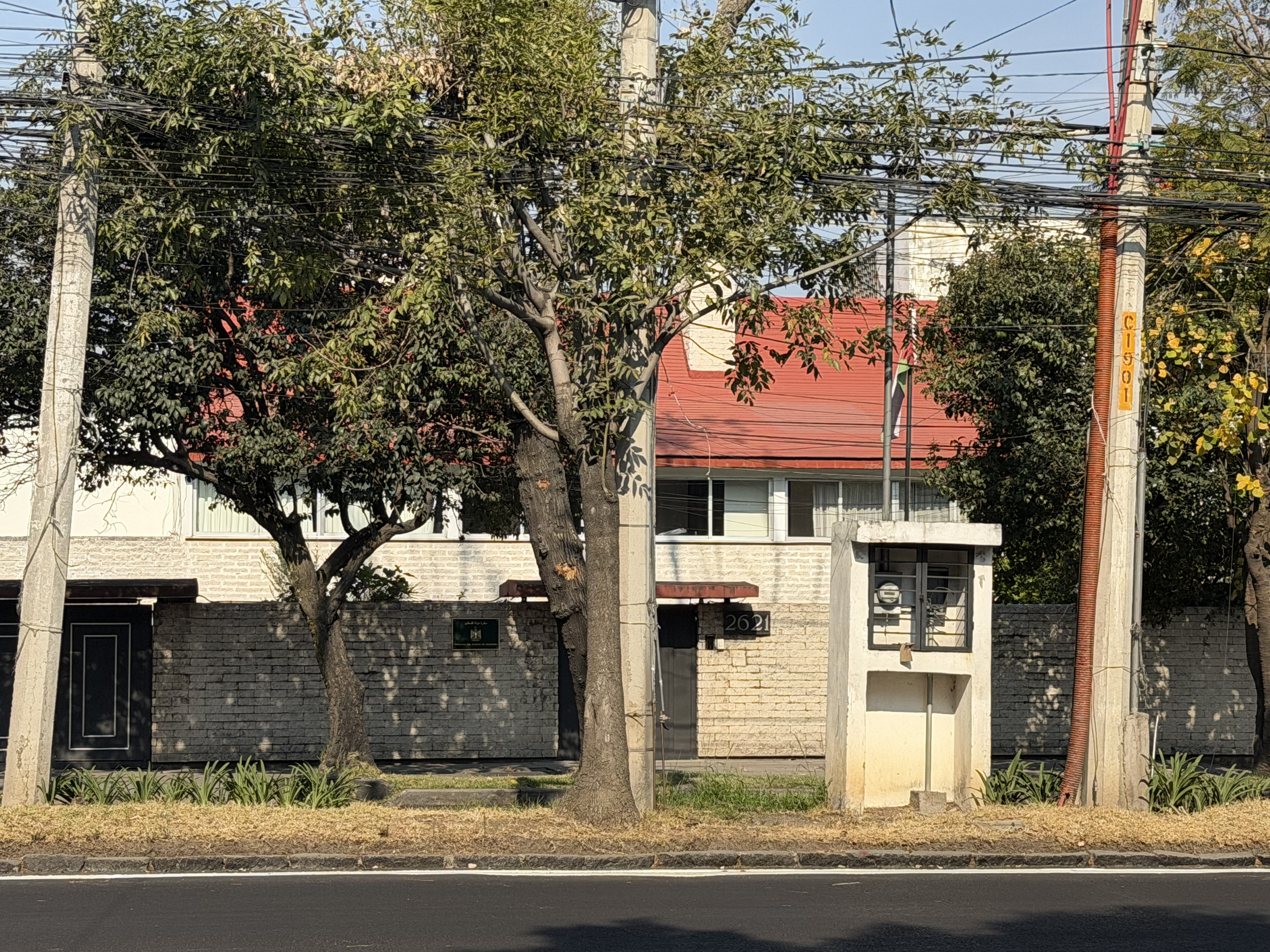
Embassy of the State of Palestine in Mexico City

== See also ==
- Palestinian Mexicans
