= Syrian Mexicans =

Syrian Mexicans sirio-mexicano سوري مكسيكي
Regions with significant populations
- Mexico City, Monterrey, Guadalajara, Toluca, Tapachula, Cuernavaca, Chiapas

Languages
- Mexican Spanish, Syrian Arabic

Religion
- Islam and Judaism

Related ethnic groups
- Syrian and Syrian diaspora

Syrian Mexicans are Mexicans of Syrian origin.

== History ==
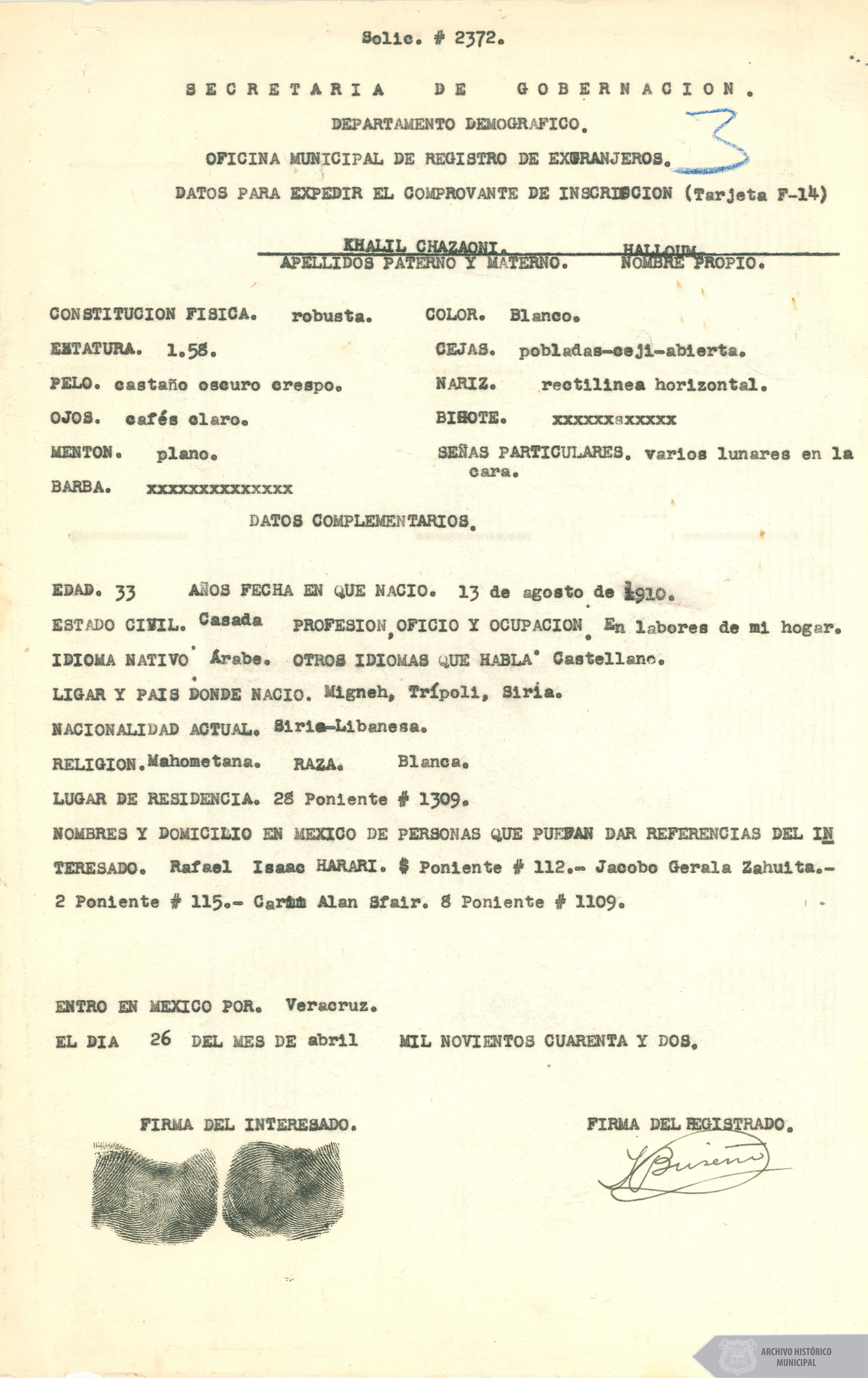
Immigrant registration form of a Muslim woman (mahometana, Mohammedan) from Tripoli Sanjak

In the early 20th century, several thousand Syrians emigrated from the Ottoman Empire to Mexico. The majority of the Syrian emigrants were of Jewish origin primarily from Aleppo and Damascus. Thousands of Syrian Jews lived in the area from the 1920s to the 1950s, creating a similar counterpart of their Middle Eastern homeland within its streets and plazas. Mexico City's Syrian Jewry is unique in that it was divided in the 1930s into two separate communities, those who were initially from Aleppo (the "Maguen David" community) and those who originated from Damascus. Several prominent Mexican intellectuals, politicians and businesspeople are of Syrian origin. Most Syrian immigrants settled in Mexico City, Monterrey, Guadalajara, Toluca, Tapachula, Cuernavaca and Chiapas.

In 2015, the Mexican government allowed a few Syrian refugees to come to Mexico and complete their university education, with the assistance of a local Mexican NGO. Mexico also donated US$3 million in support of Syrian refugees in Jordan, Lebanon and in Turkey.

== Syrian Jewish community ==
Mexico City is home to one of the world's largest Syrian Jewish communities, dating back to the early 20th century.

=== History ===
The Syrian Jewish community in Mexico City began to take shape in the early 20th century when several families from Aleppo in modern-day Syria immigrated to Mexico. They were seeking new economic opportunities and a better life and fleeing religious persecution and political instability in the Ottoman Empire. The initial wave of immigration took place between the 1910s and 1920s, but it continued in smaller numbers throughout the 20th century.

The Syrian Jewish community in Roma, Mexico City was tight-knit, continuing to carry on Syrian and Jewish customs in their own homes, schools, and shops. Arabic continued to be frequently spoken in the community until the late 1930s.

In the 1930s, the Syrian Jewish community split between families from Aleppo and families from Damascus. In 1931, Aleppo-Syrian Jews established the Rodfe Sédek synagogue, based on the Great Synagogue of Aleppo. In 1953, the Monte Sinaí Synagogue was completed in Roma by the Damascus-Syrian Jewish community.

In the 1950s, Syrian Jews began to move from the Roma neighborhood to Polanco, with basically all members of the community having relocated by the 1970s.

=== Cultural identity ===
The community speaks a distinct Judeo-Arabic dialect known as "Haketiya" or "Judeo-Syrian," which blends Arabic, Hebrew, and some Spanish elements. Regarding religious practices, the community follows Sephardic traditions, which originated in the Iberian Peninsula and were spread by Spanish and Portuguese Jews after their expulsion in 1492.

== Demographics ==
Syrian immigration to Mexico between 1921 and 2000
Year	Syrian residents
1921	4.715 ▲
1930	5.159 ▲
1940	1.041 ▼
1980	893 ▼
1990	478 ▼
2000	319 ▼
2010	222 ▼
2015	3.633 ▲

== Notable people ==
- Rosemary Barkett, first woman to serve on the Florida Supreme Court, and the first woman Chief Justice of that court. She subsequently served as a federal judge on the United States Court of Appeals for the Eleventh Circuit, and currently serves as a judge on the Iran–United States Claims Tribunal
- Isaac Saba Raffoul, billionaire businessman
- Arturo Elías Ayub, businessman
- Ikram Antaki, writer
- José Sulaimán, boxing official
- Mauricio Sulaimán, businessman and sports administrator
- Fernanda Arozqueta, member of the Mexican pop band, La Nueva Banda Timbiriche and actress with a Syrian father

== See also ==
- Arab Mexican
- Lebanese Mexicans
- Mexico–Syria relations
