= Anahuac Mayab University =

Mexican university

Coordinates: 21°06′38″N 89°36′41″W

- Universidad Anáhuac Mayab
- Motto: Vince in Bono Malum
- Motto in English: Overcome Evil with Good
- Type: Private
- Established: 1984
- Rector: Ing. Miguel Pérez Gómez (Since 2016).
- Students: 3,100
- Location: Mérida, Yucatán, Mexico
- Website: www.anahuacmayab.mx

The Anahuac Mayab University (Spanish: Universidad Anáhuac Mayab) is a private institution of higher education in Mérida, Yucatán, Mexico and belongs to the religious congregation of the Legion of Christ.

It was founded in 1984 through an initiative of Archbishop Manuel Castro Ruiz with the support of a group of businessmen from southern Mexico. The university began with degrees in Business Administration, Tourism Business Administration, Accounting, and Law.

At present, 22 bachelor degrees are offered, plus masters and doctoral degrees.

Anahuac Mayab joined the international Anahuac University Network in 2004, made up of 9 universities in Mexico and 6 abroad. In the year 2006 it becomes the first educational institution in the national scope to obtain 100% accreditation of its educational programs, through the organizations belonging to COPAES (Council for Accreditation of Higher Education).

== See also ==
- Education in Mexico
- Anahuac Universities Network
