= Edgar Elías Azar =

Mexican Judge (born 1946)

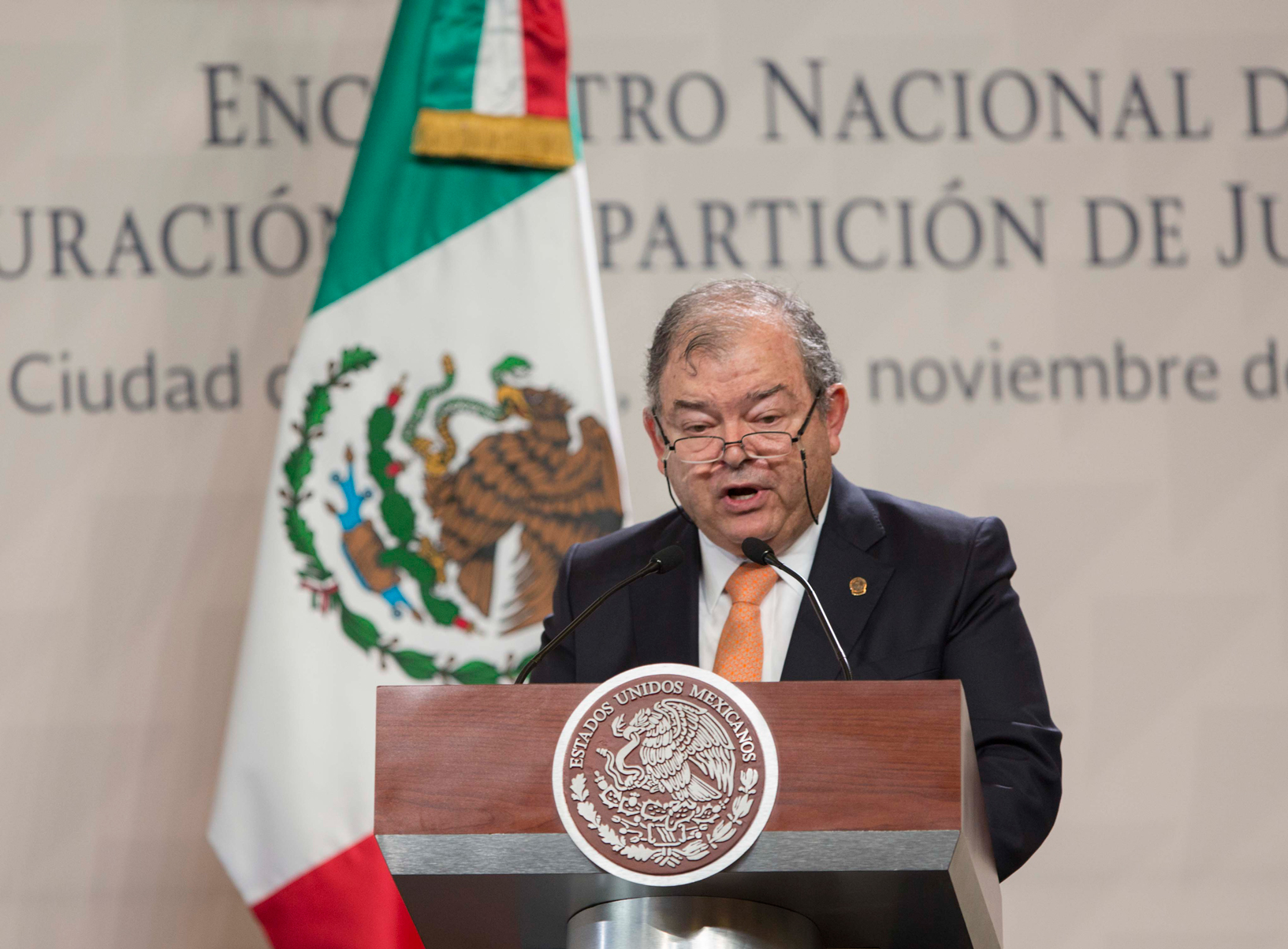

President Magistrate of the High Court of Justices of the Federal District of Mexico.

Personal details
- Born: August 7, 1946 (age 79) Acapulco, Guerrero, Mexico
- Occupation: Jurist
- Website: www.edgareliasazar.com

Edgar Elías Azar (born 1946) Mexican Judge. President Magistrate of the High Court of Justices of the Federal District of México is currently heading his third term as head of the judiciary for the period 2016-2018 which won in a formal ceremony preceded by the senior magistrate Among its main objectives it has been found the justice innovation and modernization of services in everyday justice in Mexico.

== Biography ==
Azar was born in the coastal city of Acapulco in the state of Guerrero (Mexico) on 7 August 1946. His undergraduate studies were undertaken in the School of Law at the National Autonomous University of Mexico (UNAM) obtaining his first law degree on 17 August 1970. In 1988 he completed two post-graduate degrees. The first in international arbitration at the Free School of Law (Escuela Libre de Derecho), and the second in civil law at the University of Post-Graduate Studies of Law in Mexico City. In August 2000, he obtained a master's degree in Civil Contracts at the Iberoamerican University (Universidad Iberoamericana) and in 2002 an additional master's degree in Advanced Studies at the Complutense University of Madrid. In January 2005 Elías obtained his doctorate of Law, with a unanimous honorable mention, at Complutense University of Madrid.

== Career ==
With nearly 40 years of service in the public sector, 13 stand out in Public Administration at both the state and federal levels. During this time he served as Legal Director of Heritage of Public Welfare, Regulations and Control Directorate General of Acquisitions as Director, Legislation and Consultation Directorate General of Legal Affairs as Director and as Finance Secretary of the State Government of Guerrero.

Throughout his career Dr. Edgar Elías Azar consistently supported organized efforts to inaugurate the first six courtrooms for oral proceedings in Mexico City. These achievements arguably improved the performance of the judicial system primarily by vastly improving training programs for this new method of arbitration in the Mexican courtroom.

His extensive personal contributions to academia as both professor and lecturer in the field of law include the following institutions: American University of Acapulco, The Universidad Anáhuac México Sur, Universidad Iberoamericana, Autonomous Technological Institute of Mexico (ITAM), Free School of Law, Legal Institute at the National Autonomous University of Mexico (UNAM). In addition his lectures have been present in international forums in both private and public sectors playing relevant activities within the federal government's initiatives.

== In the courts ==
His work in the courts spans nearly 30 years beginning as manager, continuing as a transitional “G” level archivist for the judicial file system, an "F" level stenographer, Secretary of the First Joint Criminal Court for Peace. In addition, he held various administrative positions up to 1969 when he was appointed “A” level Judge of the Peace of Cuautepec Barrio Bajo.

He went on to hold the job of 15th Judge of the Peace of the Judicial Party of the Federal District, Ninth judge of the Civil and Magistrate Affairs (1993–1999) and Magistrate of the First Civil Hall from 2003 through 2007. After being reelected for a third term, he currently serves as President both of the High Court of Justice and the Judicial Counsel of the Federal District.

== Other projects ==
He played a crucial role in various legislative sessions that have produced important reforms to laws relating to the administration of justice.

He has published several books and has appeared in several magazines.

== Publications ==
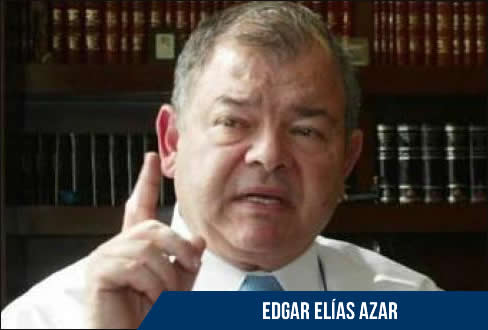
EliasAzar-lassietepartidas

1. The Seven Line Items, Federal District, 2007-2012 – (2012) - Las Siete Partidas, DF 2007-2012.
2. Mexican Network of Judicial Cooperation – (2011) - Red Mexicana de Cooperación Judicial -2011.
3. The Figure of the Practicing Judge in the New Penal System – (2011) - Figura del Juez de Ejecución en el Nuevo Sistema Penal (2011).
4. 21ST Round of Conferences on Judiciary Updates (2011) - XXI Ciclo de Conferencias de Actualización Judicial 2011.
5. Memoirs of the National Congress on Procedural Law (2011) - Memorias del Congreso Nacional de Derecho Procesal - (2011).
6. Manual on the Justification of Corporate Rights (2011) - Manual sobre Justiciabilidad de Derechos Sociales - (2011).
7. Law in Europe and Latin America (2010) - El Derecho de Europa y de America Latina.
8. Accusatory Penal System in Environmental Matters (2010) - Sistema Penal Acusatorio en Materia Ambiental - (2010).
9. Application of International Documents in matters of Human Rights (2010) - Aplicación de Instrumentos Internacionales en Materia de DH - (2010).
10. Memoirs of the 20th Round of Conferences on Judiciary Updates (2010) - Memorias XX Ciclo de Conferencias de Actualización Judicial - (2010).
11. Human Rights Today (2010) - Actualidad en Derechos Humanos (2010).
12. Latin Phrases and Expressions (2008) - Frases y Expresiones Latinas - (2008).
