= Beatriz Peschard =

Mexican architect

Beatriz Peschard Mijares
- Born: Mexico City, Mexico
- Education: Universidad Anáhuac México
- Occupation: Architect
- Spouse: Alejandro Bernardi
- Awards: Créateurs Design Award (2020)

Beatriz Peschard Mijares is a Mexican architect. She founded the architecture firm Bernardi Peschard Arquitectura in 2000, focusing mostly on residential and corporate projects. Her designs, such as the AA315 House in Mexico City, use motifs from architects such as Mies van der Rohe. Many of Peschard's projects, including the AA315 House, incorporate the surrounding landscape with a modernist architectural design. Peschard serves on the editorial board of Architectural Digest México.

== Early life and education ==
Peschard was born in Mexico City but traveled frequently as a child. She has stated her path to architecture began when she was eight years old, when she designed a pool to be built in the empty lot next to her family's home.

Peschard studied architecture in Mexico City at Universidad Anáhuac México and was taught by many of Mexico's most important 20th century architects, including Mario Pani, José Luis Calderón Cabrera, Héctor Bracho, and Sara Topelson.

== Personal life ==
While a student at Universidad Anáhuac México, Peschard met Alejandro Bernardi, who later became her husband. Bernardi co-founded Bernardi + Peschard Arquitectura with Peschard in 2000.

In an interview, Peschard noted that being married to her business partner brings “heart” into her work. She also stated that blending her personal and professional lives has resulted in a search for balance between durability, neutrality and timelessness in her projects, based in her personal struggles balancing “family life, being a mother, and her work.”

== Career ==
Peschard has designed private homes, residential projects, and mixed-use corporate offices in Mexico since 1991. In interviews, she has stated that she believes Mexico City is a uniquely situated space for architectural experimentation.

In 2017, Peschard stated that it's important to “Try to invent new things, not to copy either the Mexican or the foreigner... [but to] search our history and combine what we find with technological and technical advances to create something personal and innovative.”

Her interior designs often "revolve around art," and her buildings have included furniture pieces by Henge, Ceccotti, Minotti and Christophe Delcourt. According to Architectural Digest, the harmony of space in her designs is achieved "due to the application of a sober color palette, where gray tones and a contrast of natural woods converge."

== Awards ==
- 2005 | AD México, Íconos del Diseño Award (Best Corporate Architecture)
- 2017 | AD México, Íconos del Diseño Award (Best Residential Architecture) - AA315 House
- 2020 | Créateurs Design Award (Best Residential Design) - Country House Valle de Bravo
