= Palestinian Mexicans =

Total population
- 13,000

Regions with significant populations
- Mexico City, Yucatán, Baja California

Languages
- Mexican Spanish, Palestinian Arabic

Religion
- Christianity and Islam

Related ethnic groups
- Arab Mexicans

Palestinian Mexicans are Mexican citizens of Palestinian descent residing in Mexico. There are approximately 13,000 Mexicans of Palestinian origin.

== History ==
The period of Palestinian migration to Mexico took place from 1893 to 1949. Palestinian immigration to Mexico continued during the mid-20th century, when the Middle East witnessed a mass emigration of Lebanese, Syrians, and Palestinians fleeing from political instability. Approximately 23,000 Palestinians were registered as Arab without taking into account the different nationalities. With the decades that followed, tens of thousand of migrants from Palestine as well as other Arab nations began arriving in Mexico. World War I created a new wave as widespread food shortages and famine ravaged the Levant.

The delimitation is given by the data that the analyzed source throws. The flows of Palestinian immigrants to Mexico began at the end of the 20th century, and from then on they continued to occur, either increased or decreased according to the periods until reaching their end of emigration. The survey of the economic and sociocultural aspects of the Palestinians in Mexico and their process of integration into the country was based exclusively on the fieldwork carried out in Monterrey and Torreon.

== Notable people ==
- Gabriel Zaid, writer and intellectual
- Yasser Corona, former professional footballer

== See also ==
- Arab Mexicans
- Immigration to Mexico
- Mexico–Palestine relations
