= María de Lourdes Dieck-Assad =

Mexican economist

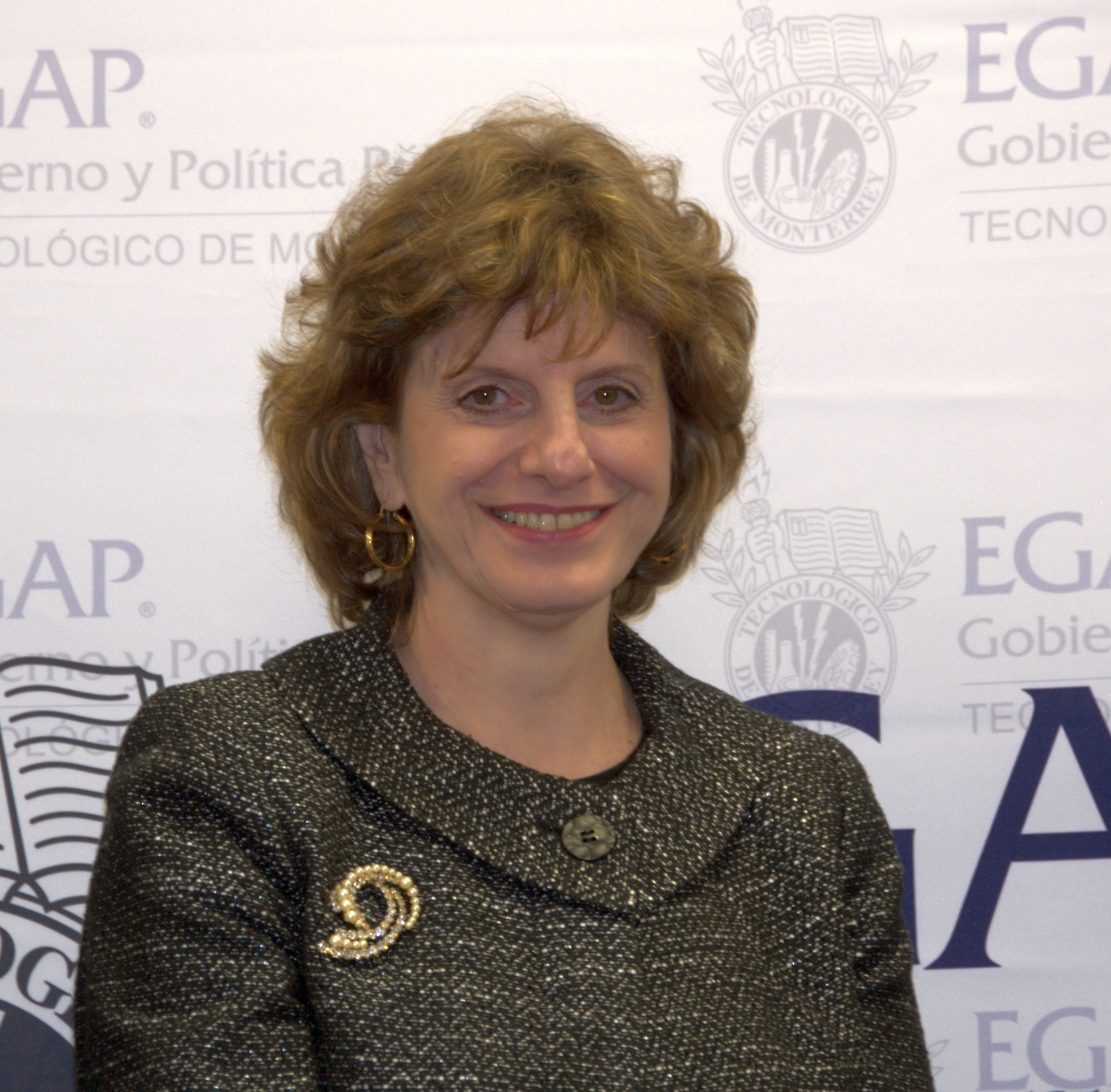
- Dieck-Assad at a book presentation at Monterrey Institute of Technology and Higher Education, Mexico City
- Born: Mexico
- Education: Monterrey Institute of Technology and Higher Education (BA); Vanderbilt University (MA); University of Texas at Austin (PhD)

María de Lourdes Dieck-Assad is a Mexican economist who has held positions in academia, an international organization, government and business, including professorships in the United States and Mexico as well as serving as Mexico's ambassador to Belgium, Luxembourg and the institutions of the European Union from 2004 to 2007. For her service in this capacity, she was awarded the Grand Cross of the Order of the Crown of Belgium. She attended the Monterrey Institute of Technology and Higher Education (ITESM from its name in Spanish) from 1971 to 1975, graduating with a bachelor's in economics. She received her master's in 1976 from Vanderbilt University and her doctorate in the same field from the University of Texas in Austin in 1983 with a dissertation entitled "The effect of economic shocks under different monetary procedures and different economic structures," which she wrote as an intern at the Brookings Institution . She has said that she wanted to work to make an impact on Mexico since she was studying as an undergraduate, mostly in economic and social issues. Her husband is economist Pedro Quintanilla Gómez-Noriega. They lived in Austin, Texas for five years, where they both pursued doctoral studies in Economics. Then they went to live in Washington, DC where both worked. They returned to Mexico in 1992. When an opportunity came for Dieck-Assad to represent Mexico in Europe, she received the full support of her husband and her three children, who were already in high school and college.

== Career ==
Dieck-Assad's main passion is macroeconomics, working to create cross-sector relationships among the business, government and academic sectors, holding various positions in all these areas. Sub specialties include money and banking, quantitative methods, economic planning and economic development.

Her first major position was director of the economics department of the Universidad Anáhuac in Mexico City from 1977 to 1978. She later became a tenured professor as well as the head of the economics department at Trinity University in Washington DC from 1987 to 1992, then a professor of economics at ITESM from 1992 to 2002. From 1995 to 2002, she has head of the doctoral program in doctoral program in management at ITESM (EGADE) of ITESM as well as working with the Center for Strategic Studies. From 2002 to 2003 she was chief of advisors to the secretary of the State Department as well as to the secretary of Economy. In 2003, she was appointed by President Vicente Fox as Undersecretary of Foreign Affairs for Economic Relations and International Cooperation of the Ministry of Foreign Affairs. Dieck-Assad was then appointed by Fox in 2004 as the ambassador to Belgium and Luxembourg, where she also served as the Mission Head to the European Union and the permanent representative to the European Council. She returned to Mexico in 2007 to become the director of the Escuela de Gobierno, Ciencias Sociales y Humanidades of ITESM campus system.

She has worked as a consultant to various companies and institutions such as the, Asesoría Estratégica Económica y Financiera, Consultores Asociados, Bancomer, the government of the state of Nuevo León, with whom she worked on market and country studies, financial sector analysis and the determination of prices for public holdings. She worked as a consultant as well for the World Bank from 1985 to 1987 in Washington, DC. Dieck-Assad has given courses, seminars and talks at over 85 conferences to students at various levels, businessmen and more in Mexico, the United States, Latin America and Europe. These generally center on topics such as macroeconomics, theoretical economics, monetary policy, global economics, competitiveness, globalization and more, focusing on Mexico, Latin American and global issues. Recognitions include the Grand Cross of the Order of the Crown of Belgium, the country's highest award for her work as the ambassador from Mexico as well as best evaluated professor at ITESM. She also received tenure at Trinity University and scholarships with the Brookings Institution, the Sally Butler International Fellowship from the American Association of University Women, membership in Phi Kappa Phi, a fellowship from CONACYT, a Fulbright Scholarship and was named the best student in Mexico (Ateneo de México) while an undergraduate, for achieving the highest grade point average at the end of her undergraduate studies in economics at ITESM, class of 1975.

== Published works ==
She collaborated with Nobel Prize winner Paul A. Samuelson, William D. Nordhaus and José de Jesús Salazar on "Macroeconomía con aplicaciones a México" (1998, 2001) as well as "Macroeconomía con aplicaciones a América Latina" (2006) with the same co authors. She also contributed the "Violence and ungovernability in Latin America and the Caribbean: The Mexican case" chapter to a book called "Regional integration and social cohesion (RISC)." (egap) She has had articles published in journals such as the University of St. Thomas Law Journal, Revista Integratec, Revista Mexicana de Política Exterior and the International Journal of the Canadian Institute of International Affairs as well as papers for conferences such as Ciclo de conferencias internacionales: Conociendo China at Universidad Virtual, Tecnológico de Monterrey, Congreso Nacional de Maquiladoras and the II International conference of management in the new millennium: Iberoamerica looks at the future.

== See also ==
- List of Monterrey Institute of Technology and Higher Education faculty
- "Most widely held works by Maria de Lourdes Dieck-Assad". WorldCat.
