= Arturo Elías Ayub =

Mexican businessman

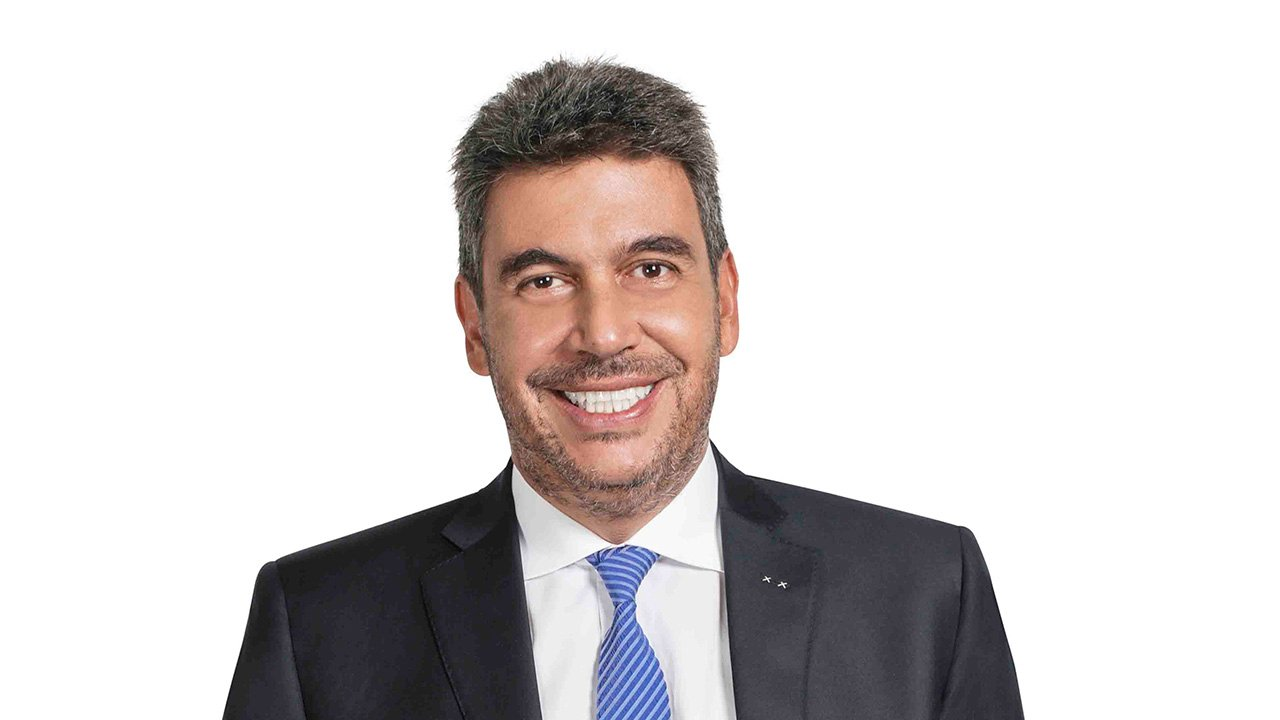
- Born: April 27, 1966 (age 60); Mexico City, Mexico
- Other name: Arturo Elías
- Education: Universidad Anáhuac México (BBA)
- Occupation: Businessman
- Known for: CEO of Telmex Foundation; CEO of Strategic Alliances of Telmex; Chair of OraTV together with Larry King; Director of UNO Noticias; Chair of the Board of Club Universidad Nacional
- Spouse: Johanna Slim (m. 1995)
- Children: 3

Arturo Elías Ayub (born April 27, 1966) is a Mexican businessman, currently Director of Strategic Alliances of Telmex (Teléfonos de Mexico), CEO of the Telmex Foundation and director of UNO Noticias.

== Life and career ==
Elías Ayub was born on April 27, 1966 in Mexico City, to a family originally from Lebanon and Syria. He is the younger brother of Alfredo Elías Ayub. He graduated as Bachelor of Business Administration by the Universidad Anáhuac (Anáhuac University), and later studied a postgraduate course in Business Management at the IPADE.

He is married to Johanna Slim, daughter of businessman Carlos Slim, and they have three children.

== Professional activity ==
He joined Telmex in 1996 as Advisor of the Directorate and in 2001 took over as chairman of the board of the Association Football team Club Universidad Nacional, commonly known as "UNAM Pumas" in Mexico. During his tenure at the club managed to get a "double championship" in the Clausura 2004 and Opening 2004. In 2005 decided not to be re-elected in the patronage.

Currently he serves on the board of directors of Grupo Carso, Grupo Inbursa, Telmex, CEO of Telmex Foundation and Chairman of the Instituto Telmex del Deporte (Telmex Institute for Sports).
