= Mexico–Syria relations =

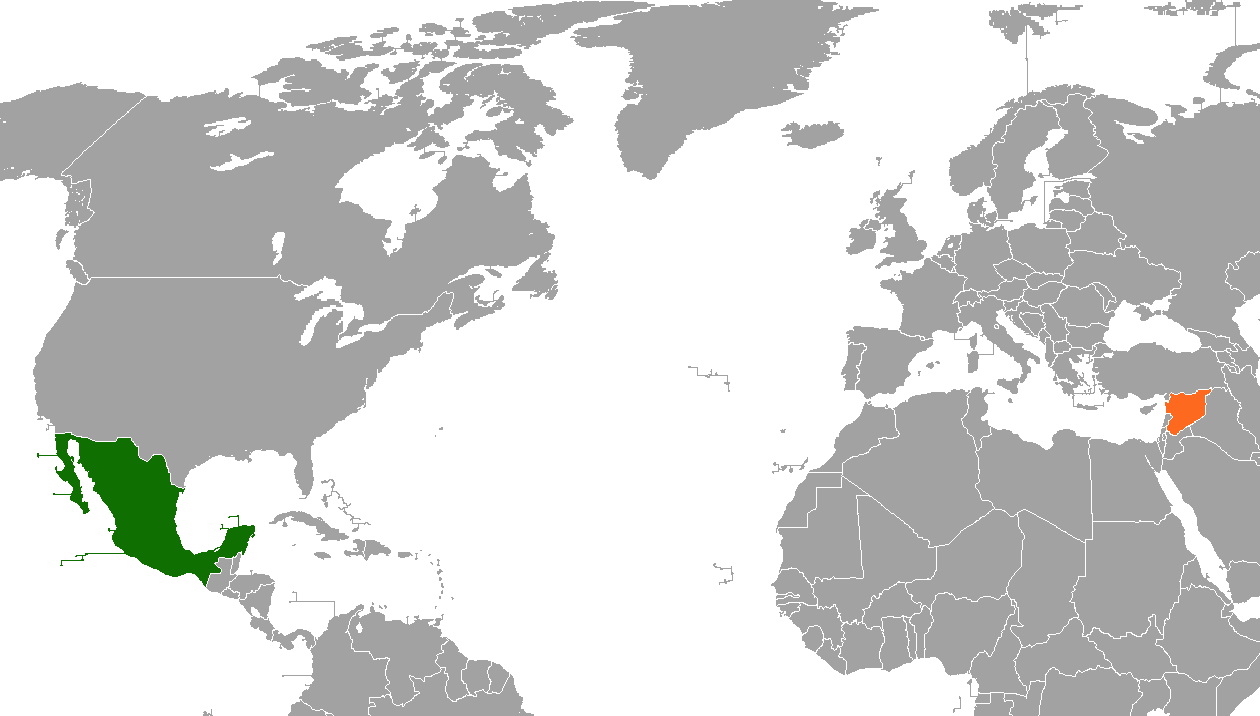

- Mexico: Syria

Mexico–Syria relations are the bilateral and diplomatic relations between the United Mexican States and the Syrian Arab Republic. The nations of Mexico and Syria established diplomatic relations in 1950. Both nations are founding members of the United Nations.

== History ==
In the early 20th century, several thousand Syrians emigrated from the Ottoman Empire (for which Syria was a part of at the time) to Mexico. Many of the Syrian emigrants were of Jewish origin primarily from Aleppo and Damascus. Several prominent Mexican intellectuals, politicians and businesspeople are of Syrian origin.

Mexico and Syria established diplomatic relations on 28 August 1950. In 1958, Syria joined Egypt as part of the United Arab Republic. That same year, diplomatic relations between Mexico and Syria ceased while Mexico maintained diplomatic relations with Cairo. In 1961, Syria broke from the union and became again an independent nation. Mexico re-established diplomatic relations with Syria in September 1961.

In 1994, Mexico opened an honorary consulate in Damascus. In October 2009, Mexican Foreign Undersecretary, Lourdes Aranda Bezaury, paid a visit to Syria. During her visit, she met with Syrian Foreign Minister Walid Muallem and reiterated Mexico's interest in expanding and strengthening its presence in the region, as well as in strengthening relations with Arab countries. In December 2010, Syrian Minister of the Environment, Kawkab Sabah al-Daya, paid a visit to Mexico to attend the 2010 United Nations Climate Change Conference in Cancún.

In March 2011, the Syrian Civil War began. Since then, relations between both nations have become non-existent. Since the start of the civil war, Mexico's position has been to condemn the violence caused by the parties involved in it and has expressed concern about the serious consequences and humanitarian tragedy arising from the crisis in that country. Mexico has also strongly condemned the use of chemical weapons and serious violations of human rights and International Humanitarian Law. Mexico considers that the only viable solution to the conflict in Syria is one of a political nature, and has called on the international community to act responsibly and avoid sending military equipment and weapons to any of the parties. In 2014, Mexico closed its honorary consulate in Damascus.

In July 2014, Mexican Foreign Minister José Antonio Meade paid a visit to Jordan and traveled visit the Syrian refugee camp of Zaatari to observe the humanitarian crisis facing the refugees. In 2015, the Mexican government allowed a few Syrian refugees to come to Mexico and complete their university education, with the assistance of a local Mexican NGO. Mexico also donated US$3 million in support of Syrian refugees in Jordan, Lebanon and in Turkey.

In February 2023, Syria suffered a series of earthquakes. In response, the Mexican government sent a search and rescue mission to Syria and donated US$6 million to the United Nations in Syria for their use in assisting victims of the earthquake.

== High-level visits ==
High-level visits from Mexico to Syria

- Foreign Undersecretary Lourdes Aranda Bezaury (2009)

High-level visits from Syria to Mexico

- Minister of the Environment Kawkab Sabah al-Daya (2010)

== Bilateral relations ==
Both nations have signed an Agreement for Educational and Cultural Cooperation (2004).

== Trade ==
In 2023, trade between both nations totaled US$311,000. Mexico's main exports to Syria is raw pepper. Syria's main exports to Mexico include: medical and dental chairs, electrical capacitors, plants and seeds, plastic, padlocks, and soap.

== Diplomatic missions ==
- Mexico is accredited to Syria from its embassy in Beirut, Lebanon.
- Syria does not have an accreditation to Mexico.

== See also ==
- Syrian Mexicans
