= Ninfa Salinas Sada =

Mexican politician

Ninfa Salinas
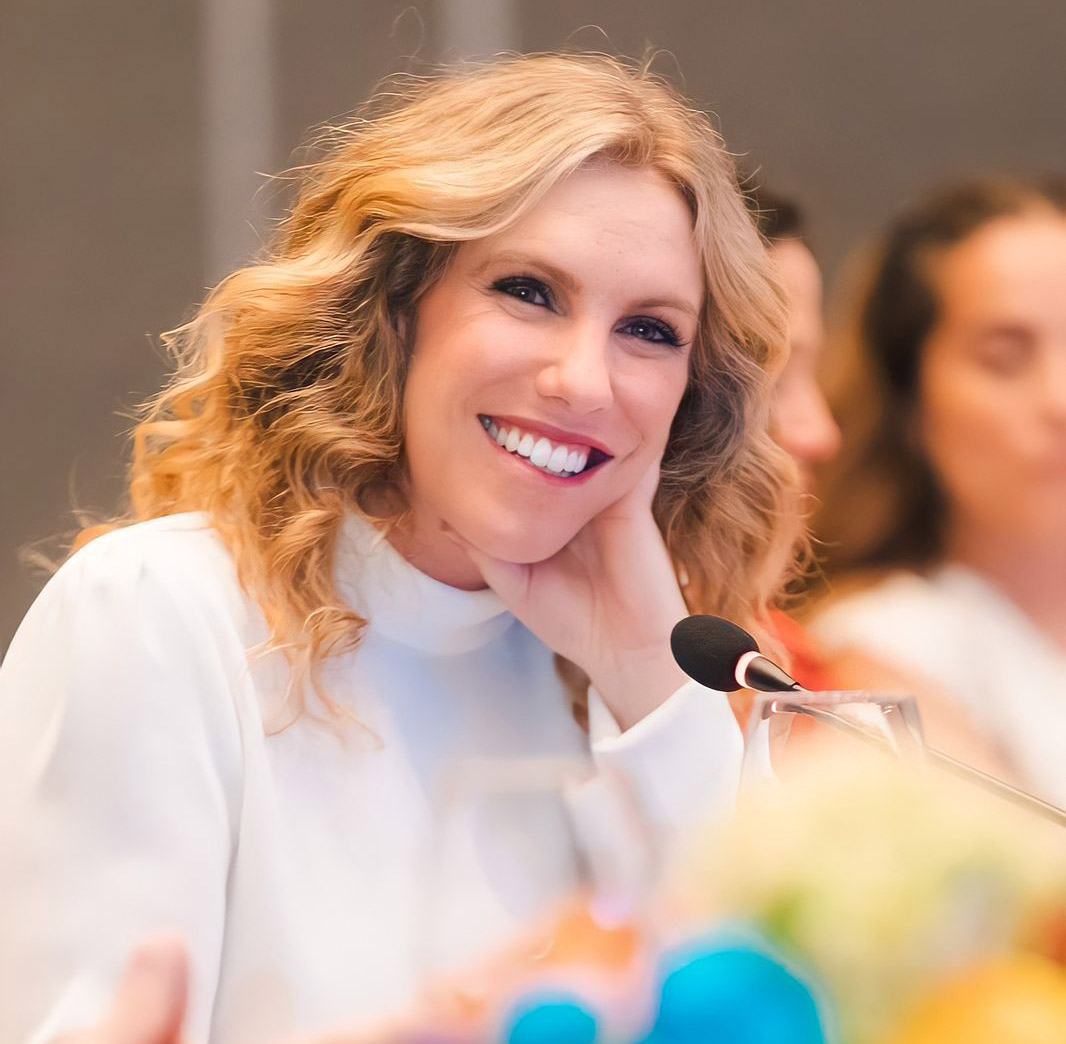

Senator of Mexico
- In office 1 September 2012 – 31 August 2018

Personal details
- Born: Ninfa Clara Salinas Sada; 1 May 1980 (age 46)
- Party: PVEM
- Education: Anahuac University
- Profession: Marketer

Ninfa Clara Salinas Sada (born May 1, 1980) is a Mexican politician, and former Mexican Senator, representing the Ecologist Green Party of Mexico (Partido Verde Ecologista de México) in the LXIII Legislature of the Mexican Congress. She began her second period in the Mexican Congress in September 2012, having served a three-year term as a member of the Chamber of Deputies, the lower house of Congress. She is one of the youngest women in history to have served in Congress.

== Education ==
Salinas holds a bachelor's degree in marketing from the Universidad Anáhuac México.

== Political career ==
Salinas chaired the Environmental and Natural Resources Committee of the Chamber of Deputies. As a Senator she was the Chair of the Environmental and Natural Resources Committee of the Mexican Senate and is a member of the Subcommittee on North American Affairs and the Water Resources Committee.

She sponsored bills and initiatives during her term, including a consensus resolution for the General Law on Climate Change. She also successfully sponsored a resolution calling on Mexico's Secretariat of Foreign Affairs to adopt the Universal Declaration on Animal Welfare; a bill to increase investment in the Mexican Institute of Water Technology; as well as legislation for the creation of the Special Forestry Commission to contribute to the sustainable development of the Mexico's forests and tropical vegetation. Among her record, she has filed over 20 bill initiatives; 10 of them related to environmental issues, and the rest focused on security, labor, taxes and voting.

She launched the i-Latina advertising agency to oversee all marketing campaigns for Mexico's Grupo Salinas, which operates in ten countries throughout with 80,000 employees. She also started an advertising company called Promo Espacio.

Salinas joined Fundación Azteca, Grupo Salinas' non-profit organization focused on improving the environment and the quality of life of the communities in which it operates, to support and participate in the Limpiemos campaign. Limpiemos is a year-long informational campaign that emphasizes the importance of taking care of the environment.

Salinas is chairwoman of Grupo Dragon, which focuses on the production of green and clean energy, including geothermal, hydraulic and eolic generation.

She is a member of the Board of Trustees of the Tamayo Museum in Mexico.
