= Victor Nacif =

Victor Nacif was the Vice President of Design at Nissan Design Europe.

He is a Mexican of Lebanese and Iraqi descent, after migrating to the United States as a child, he quickly became fluent in English. He is a graduate of the Stanford University Graduate School of Business and of the College for Creative Studies.

Nacif is also an active presence in Mothers Against Drunk Driving (MADD).

== Awards ==
- Latin-American Executive of the Year at the 12th annual Urban Wheels Awards 2008 at the Fox Theater in Detroit, Michigan.
