= Antonio Chavez Trejo =

Mexican filmmaker and writer

- Born: Antonio Chavez Trejo; May 20, 1981 (age 45); Mexico City
- Education: Universidad Anahuac del Sur, New York Film Academy - Master of Fine Arts in Filmmaking
- Occupations: Filmmaker; Writer; Producer; Entrepreneur
- Awards: «Best filmmaker in Burbank»; Glendale Film Festival

Antonio Chavez Trejo (born May 20, 1981) is a Mexican filmmaker, writer, producer and entrepreneur. His films are noted for their surreal feel, dark undertones and sense of humor, visually appealing cinematography and have been featured in many film festivals internationally including Cannes Film Festival and Glendale Film Festival.

== Life and career ==
Antonio was born and raised in Mexico City. In 2005, he received his bachelor's degree in Science of Communication from the Universidad Anahuac del Sur where he met his screenwriting mentor The Palme d'Or winner and Oscars-nominated writer and producer Guillermo Arriaga with whom he still has a great friendship. He also possesses an associate degree from Spanish Radio TV - RTVE in Screenwriting and as a Television Anchorman and a master's degree from the New York Film Academy as a Master of Fine Arts in Filmmaking.

In 2014, his dark comedy short film Killer Tango was world premiered at Cannes Film Festival. In 2015, Antonio's short action/drama Bloody Luck premiered at Cannes Film Festival and in 2016 received 6 nominations and won Best Short Film at WIND International Film Festival. It was also an official selection at the HBO's Urban Action Show Case International Action Film Festival in New York, where it was nominated for Best Short Film.

Shortly thereafter, Antonio wrote and directed the dystopian post-apocalyptic short drama MIRA Protocol. The film premiered at Glendale Film Festival nominated as «Best Short Film» and Antonio won a «Best filmmaker in Burbank» award and got the recognition from the Legislature of the State of California in 2017 as such.

In 2018, Antonio announced that he is working on a project entitle Howlers and creating a unique scriptwriting narrating structure which allows to follow multiply story lines at the same time. The project combines three elements: 360 degree environment, traditional filmmaking and immersive theatre.
