= Modelo Museum of Science and Industry =

Coordinates: 19°17′25.17″N 99°39′8.22″W

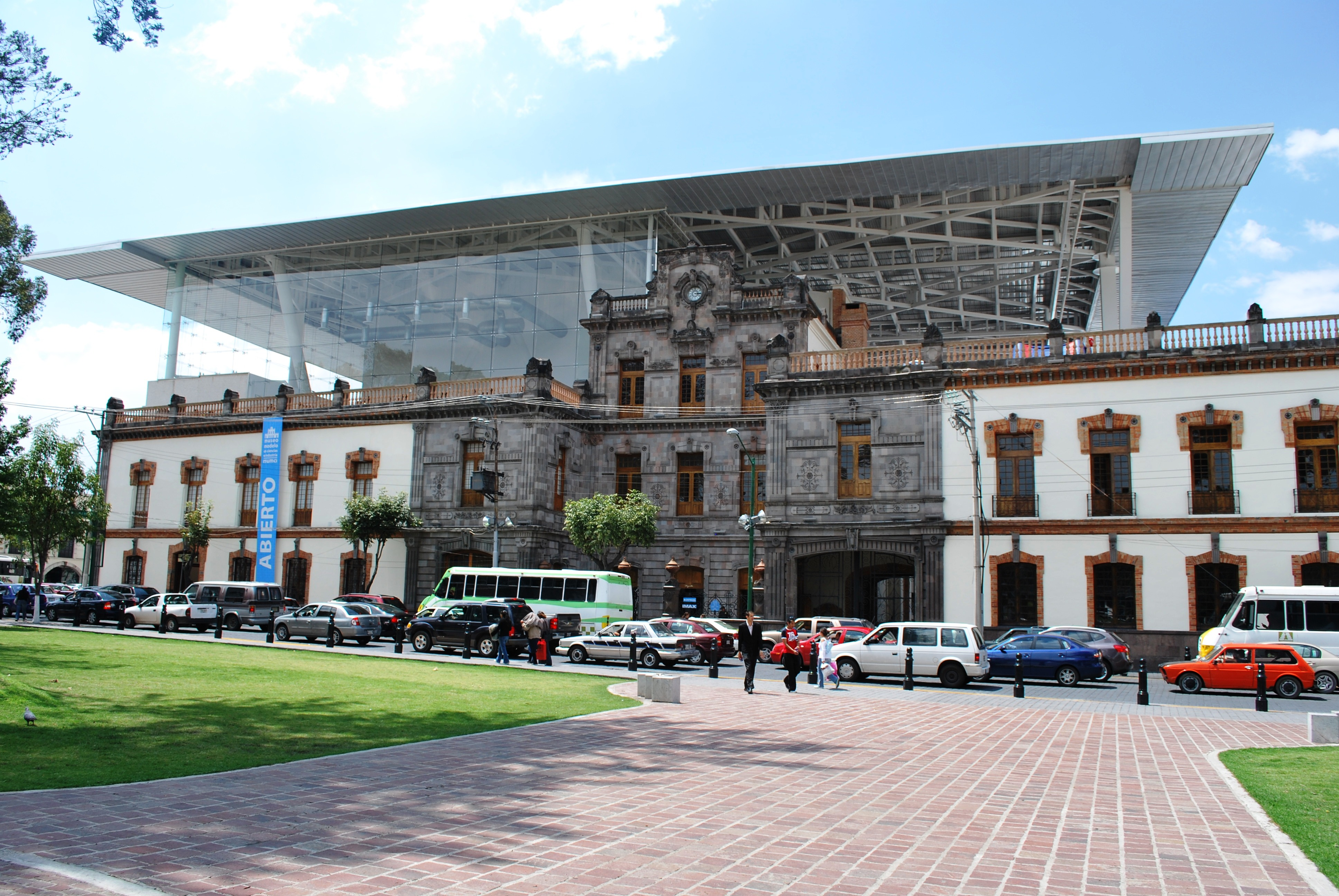
Facade of the building

Modelo Museum of Science and Industry (Spanish: Museo Modelo de Ciencia e Industria, MUMCI), is located in Toluca, capital city of Estado de Mexico. MUMCI's main goal is fostering people's interest in industry and related sciences. Besides permanent and temporary exhibitions, MUMCI offers other services, such as workshops, conferences, IMAX theatre, Ludotec, restaurant, bar, gift shop, and two parking lots.

The museum was inaugurated on 30 June 2009 by Felipe Calderón, President of Mexico.

== Features ==
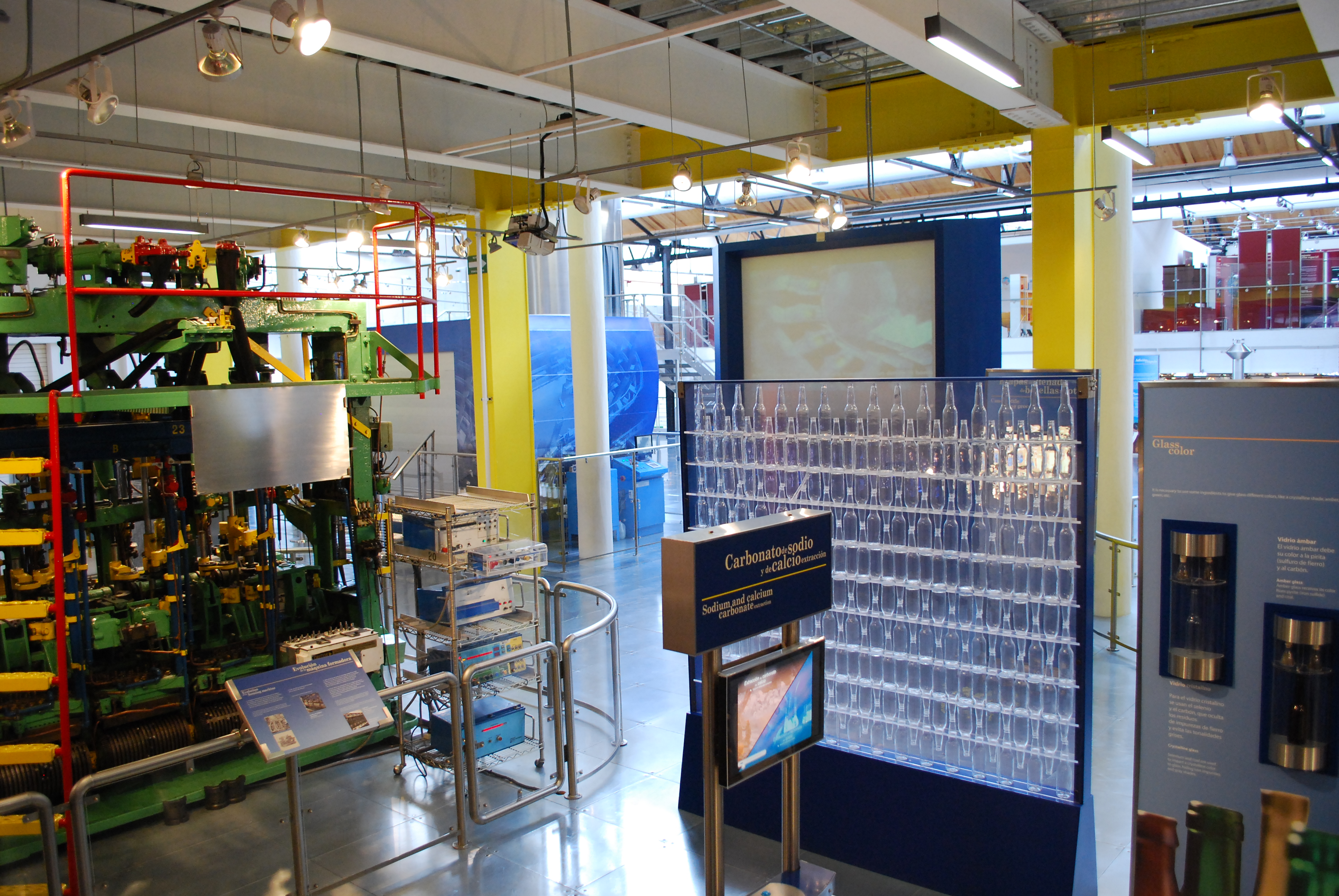
One of the halls in the museum on beer making

MUMCI is an educational space with 21 rooms. Out of them, 15 rooms show different industrial branches, including: brewing, glass, metal-mechanics, cardboard and paper, among others. MUMCI also has 6 exhibit rooms showing the human side of the industry: Industry's history and the stakeholders. All these subjects were organized using an innovative multimedia concept. Furthermore, the museum has a special area for temporary exhibitions supplementing MUMCI's contents.

== History ==
MUMCI is the result of the humanitarian vision of Grupo Modelo, a leading company in the brewing industry. The selection process for the architectural drawings to remodel and restore the venue began in 2004. For over four years, more than a hundred experts of different industrial sectors contributed with practical and theoretical knowledge to the curatorial scripts of each room. The museographic production work immediately followed each script. With the architectural works still in progress, the mounting arrangements began in 2008 and were completed in the summer 2009, upon MUMCI's inauguration.

== Building ==
MUMCI's venue is the building of the old brewery "Compañía Cervecera Toluca y México", located in front of Zaragoza Garden, in Toluca's historical downtown. The property dates back to the turn of the 19th century, when one of the leading breweries during Porfirio Diaz administration was built, home to the Mexican beer with the longest tradition, Victoria Beer.

The restoration works on the building began in 2007 as part of the architectural project and lay-out proposal for a museum of science and industry, presented by Architect José de Arimatea Moyao. The office building and the corridor where the educational workshops are currently located were preserved. A historical research work authorized by INAH (National Institute of History and Anthropology) was conducted to distinguish the original spaces from subsequent construction works.
