= Universidad Anáhuac México =

Private university in Mexico

Anahuac University Mexico
- Universidad Anáhuac México
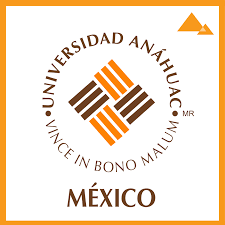
- Motto: Latin: Vince in Bono Malum
- Motto in English: Defeat Evil with Good
- Type: Private Catholic higher education institution
- Established: 1964; 62 years ago
- Religious affiliation: Roman Catholic (Legion of Christ)
- Rector: Cipriano Sánchez García, LC
- Administrative staff: 900+
- Students: 17,700 (2021)
- Undergraduates: 14,956 (as of 2021)
- Postgraduates: 2,753 (as of 2021)
- Location: Huixquilucan and Mexico City, Mexico
- Campus: Urban; North Campus Huixquilucan de Degollado 22 hectares (220,000 m^{2}); South Campus Mexico City
- Nickname: Lions
- Mascot: Leonel
- Website: www.anahuac.mx

The Anahuac University Mexico (Spanish: Universidad Anáhuac México) is a private higher education institution in Mexico. It has two campuses: the North Campus is in Huixquilucan de Degollado and the South Campus is in Mexico City.

These two campuses were independent institutions until August 11, 2016, when they merged to form the Anahuac University Mexico.

The university belongs to the Catholic religious congregation of the Legionaries of Christ. Anáhuac means "near the water" in Nahuatl, the ancient Aztec language spoken in Tenochtitlan, which used to be the biggest and most crowded place in what is now Mexico City, the home of the university.

== Overview ==
- Name: "Anahuac" means "near the water". The name passed on to the whole network because of the location of the first university in the network, the campus "Universidad Anahuac Mexico Norte" located in the area of Lomas Anahuac in Interlomas in Mexico City. Symbolically, the name refers to "the lake region that gave central place at the Aztec capital: Tenochtitlán, America's most populous and largest cultural development, where the City of Mexico now stands and in it, the university"
- Motto: "Vince In Bono Malum", or "defeat evil with good".
- Coat of arm/logo: The emblem of the Universidad Anahuac shows a woven fabric.

== Organization ==
=== Background and scope of the institution ===
Universidad Anahuac México is part of the Anahuac Universities Network, an international network of Catholic universities led by the Legionaries of Christ, which share a mission and an educational model. It is made up of universities at an international level with ten institutions in Mexico, one in Chile, one in Spain, two in Italy and two more in United States. In addition, the Virtual University Anahuac serves corporate clients from twenty-five virtual institutional offices located throughout the world.

The Anahuac Universities Network shares the international education system of the Legion of Christ called the Education Consortium Anáhuac (CEA) in 18 countries and serving over 100,000 students from kindergarten to graduate school.

University rankings

Global – Overall
- QS World: 851-900 (2026)

== College life ==
=== ASUA (Social Action of Universidad Anahuac) ===
Creating and promoting social development projects through the support of students, alumni, faculty and administration.

=== FESAL (Federation of Student Societies) ===
The aim of the Federation of Student Societies is to promote, organize and direct participation of students in the activities of the Schools of the Universidad Anahuac.

==== Anáhuac Day ====
FESAL organizes Anáhuac Day, a day of integration for the university community, which includes students, teachers, managers and administrative staff through cultural activities, sports and recreation.

=== Sports ===
The sports department promotes sport among students and across the Anahuac community.

== History ==
=== Universidad Anáhuac Mexico Norte Campus ===
The North Campus (subsequently Universidad Anahuac Mexico Norte) emerged in 1964 as a key element in the educational project of the Legionaries of Christ and the founding of the congregation by Father Marcial Maciel LC. Activities started in a house located in Lomas Virreyes and enrolled forty-eight students in two degrees: Business Administration and Economics. Under the stewardship of Father Faustino Pardo LC, opened in the following years: Psychology and Human Sciences in 1965, Architecture and Law in 1966. In parallel, thanks to the support of Mexican businessmen, began the construction of new facilities at Lomas Anahuac.

In 1968 the first students graduated from Anahuac, and a new campus opened on June 4.

In 1981 the government gave the university the Law of Autonomy and Validez Oficial de Estudios.

It now occupies an area of 220,000 square metres. It includes five cafeterias, six auditoriums, one chapel, one exposition center, 175 classrooms, 27 laboratories, 21 workshops, and 18 computer labs.

It has basketball, volleyball, tennis, padel, soccer, indoor, and football courts.

=== Universidad Anáhuac México Sur ===
Anáhuac del Sur University (19.3363°N 99.2443°W) opened on September 7, 1981, offering the following academic courses: Business Administration, Tourism Business, Industrial Relations, Graphic Design and Industrial Engineering. It subsequently became Universidad Anáhuac México Sur and then the South Campus of the Universidad Anáhuac México.

== Notable alumni ==
- Antonio Chavez Trejo, filmmaker, writer, producer and entrepreneur
- Sergio Albert, former NFL player
- Alfredo Elías Ayub, public sector career
- Arturo Elías Ayub, businessman
- Álvaro Corcuera, catholic priest
- Beatriz Peschard Mijares, architect
- Álvaro Zardoni, sculptor
- Carlos Slim Domit, businessman
- Roberto Campa, politician, former presidential candidate
- Jorge Hank Rhon, businessman and politician
- Miguel Alemán Magnani, businessman, CEO of Interjet
- Yasmín Esquivel Mossa, jurist, Justice of the Supreme Court of Justice of the Nation
- Marta Sahagún, First Lady of Mexico (2001–2006)
- Rommel Pacheco, politician and former professional diver
- Joshua Mintz, TV executive
- Xavier López Ancona, entrepreneur
- Rocky de la Fuente, U.S. businessman and perennial presidential candidate
- Ninfa Salinas Sada, politician
- Laura Barrera Fortoul, politician
- Carlos Fernández González, businessman
- Leonardo Valdés Zurita, economist, former President of the Instituto Federal Electoral (currently Instituto Nacional Electoral)
- Adrián Rubalcava, Mexico City politician
- Jonathan Heath, economist, Deputy Governor of the Bank of Mexico
