= Embassy of Palestine, Mexico City =

Diplomatic mission of Palestine to Mexico

Embassy of the State of Palestine in Mexico سفارة دولة فلسطين في الولايات المتحدة المكسيكية Embajada del Estado de Palestina en México
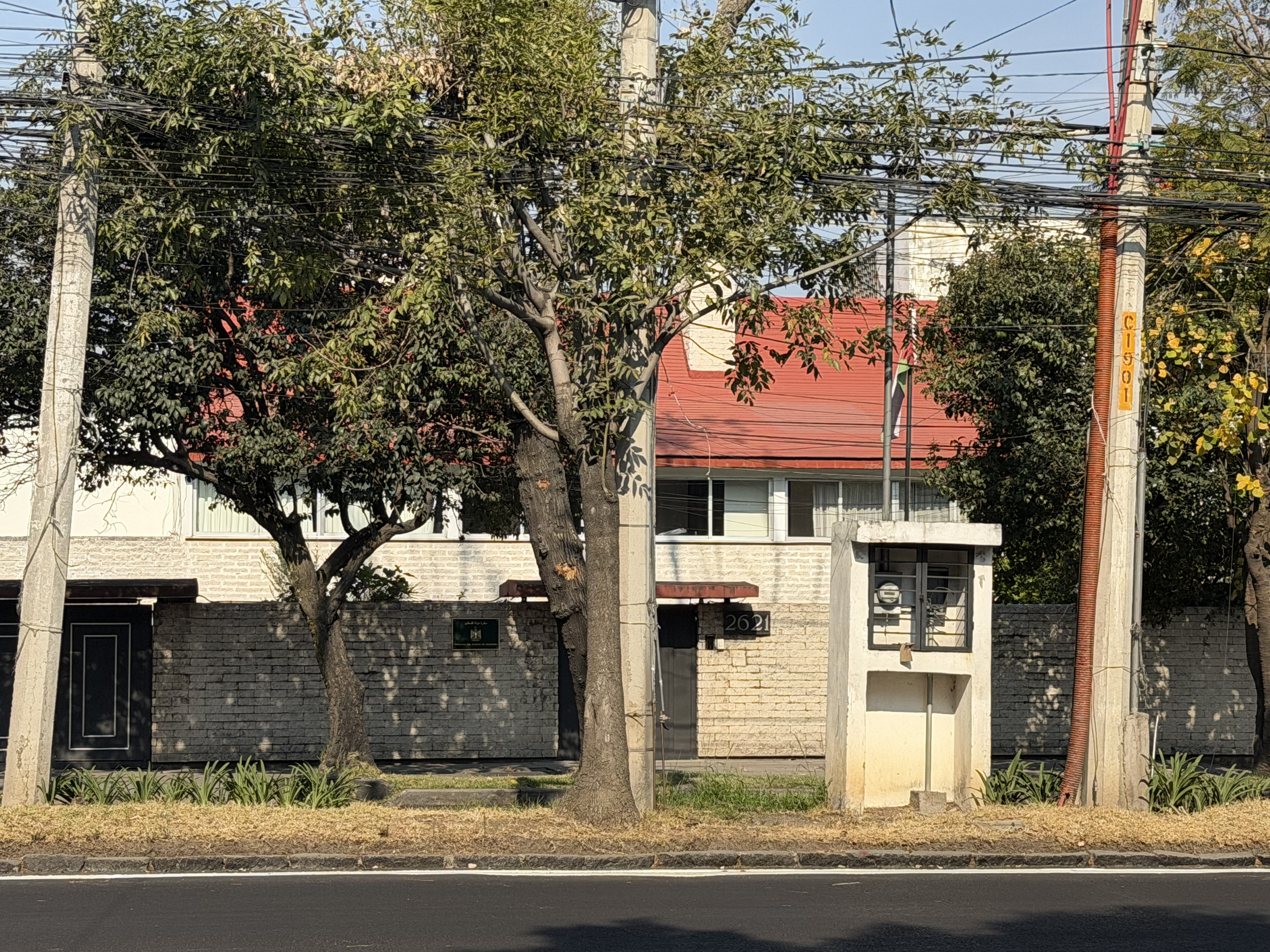
- Location: Mexico City
- Address: Paseo de la Reforma 2621, Miguel Hidalgo
- Coordinates: 19°23′43.1″N 99°14′21.7″W
- Ambassador: Nadia Rashid

The Embassy of the State of Palestine in Mexico is the highest diplomatic mission of the State of Palestine to Mexico. The embassy is located on Paseo de la Reforma in Lomas de Chapultepec, Mexico City.

== History ==
On June 2, 2023, the Palestinian Ministry of Foreign Affairs and Expatriates announced the reclassification of its diplomatic mission to Mexico from the level of a legation to the level of an embassy.

== List of ambassadors ==
- Fawzi Mustafa Al-Mashni (-2006)
- Saeed Musa Hamad (2006-2010)
- Randa Al-Nabulsi (2010–2013)
- Munjid Muhammad Amin Saleh Saleh (2013–2015)
- Mohammed Abdel Karim Ibrahim Saadat (2016–2024)
- Nadia Rachid (2024–present)

== See also ==
- List of diplomatic missions in Mexico
- List of diplomatic missions of Palestine
