= Alfredo Elías Ayub =

Mexican director

Alfredo Elías Ayub (13 January 1950 – 19 November 2025) was the former Director General of the Comisión Federal de Electricidad (CFE; English: Federal Electricity Commission), the Mexican state-owned electric company.

Elías Ayub, of Lebanese and Syrian descent, was born in Orizaba City. He earned a civil engineering degree from Universidad Anáhuac, as part of its first graduating class of the School of Engineering and graduated with high honours. He also received an MBA from Harvard Business School.

His academic roles included Deputy Director (1978-1979) and Director (1979) of Universidad Anáhuac’s Engineering School. He served as a professor of Finance at Harvard University and was a member of Harvard Business School’s board.

In his public sector career he worked across the energy and utilities sector in Mexico, culminating in his appointment as Director General of CFE in 1999, a role he held through two presidential administrations. He died on 19 November 2025 at the age of 75.

== Career ==
Elías has had an outstanding career in Mexico's public sector.

- He worked as Director of Coordination and Programming of the Mexican Fund for Social Activities (Fonapas) from 1977 to 1979.
- He was Deputy Director General in 1980 and held the position of Director General between 1981 and 1983.
- He became the Executive Coordinator at the State of Mexico government's Urban Development and Public Works Secretariat ("Secretaría de Desarrollo Urbano y Obras Públicas" in Spanish) (1983-1985).
- He then served as Private Secretary of the Secretary of Energy, Mines and State-Owned Industry (SEMIP), Alfredo del Mazo (1986).
- Coordinator of Advisors at SEMIP (1986-1988)
- Deputy Minister of Mines and Basic Industry (1988-1993) and then deputy Energy Minister (1993 - 1995) of SEMIP.
- During his tenure at the Energy Ministry, he served with several secretaries in three different administrations, during the presidencies of Miguel de la Madrid, Carlos Salinas de Gortari, and Ernesto Zedillo Ponce de León.
- He was then Director General of the Aeropuertos y Servicios Auxiliares (Mexican Airport Authority) (ASA) (1996-1999) during Zedillo's administration.
- Finally he held the position of Director General of Comisión Federal de Electricidad from January 1999 until March 2011. He was appointed to this position by president Ernesto Zedillo, and then ratified by president Vicente Fox. He was one of only two members of the PRI political party initially ratified to be part of Fox's administration. In March 2011, Elías Ayub was replaced as Director General by Antonio Vivanco Casamadrid. Elías Ayub "left the post after 12 years for health reasons."

The Federal Electricity Commission reports to the Ministry of Energy. Thus, Elías Ayub reported to Felipe Calderón Hinojosa when he was Secretary. Then, president Calderón also ratified Elías Ayub to continue his long tenure as head of the CFE.

In the private sector, he is shareholder and/or member of the boards of several companies such as Grupo Impulsor del Desarrollo Urbano (IDUSA), Constructora Ideurban, Promociones Metropólis, and other private enterprises.

== Boards ==
He belongs to several boards of directors.

- Banorte, Mexico's third largest bank
- Rotoplas
- Former Member of Dean's board of advisers at Harvard Business School
