= Vince malum bono =

Latin phrase meaning 'Overcome evil with good'

Vince malum bono or Vince in bono malum is a Latin phrase meaning Overcome evil with good or Defeat Evil with Good.

The motto comes from partial quotation from the Bible, Saint Paul's Epistle to the Romans, 12:21: "Do not be overcome by evil, but overcome evil with good" (noli vinci a malo sed vince in bono malum; Greek: Μὴ νικῶ ὑπὸ τοῦ κακοῦ, ἀλλὰ νίκα ἐν τῷ ἀγαθῷ τὸ κακόν, Mē nikō hypo tou kakou, alla nika en tō agathō to kakon).

The phrase is used as a motto at a number of institutions:

- Anahuac Universities Network
- Bishop Cotton School, Shimla
- Old Swinford Hospital
- St. Paul's Senior High School, Denu, Ghana (formerly St. Paul's Secondary School)
- Catholic Memorial School
- Inscription above entrance to Florentine Hotel, Sheffield
