= Anahuac University Network =

Catholic university system

Anahuac University Network logo

The Anahuac University Network is a private universities system grouped and administered by the religious congregation of the Legion of Christ. The network is composed of several universities, some with different names and educational approaches. The universities are located in different countries of the world, with presences in Mexico, United States, Chile, Spain, Italy and France.

The network is also affiliated with the international education system of the Legion of Christ called the Education Consortium Anáhuac (CEA) in 18 countries and serving over 100,000 students from kindergarten to graduate school. The university network was founded in 1964 by the Priest Marcial Maciel LC., and has connections to the Catholic church. The motto of the organization is "Vince in bono malum" (Overcome evil with good). The university's goal is "to form leaders of positive action".

== Mission ==
The mission is "to facilitate the process of formation and development of people of integrity who, with their excellent preparation by professional and cultural exchanges, with their deep human and moral formation, inspired by the perennial values of Christian humanism, for their genuine social conscience and for their leadership of positive action, promote the authentic development of man and society."

The name Anahuac literally means "near the water". The name is derived from the location of the first university in the network, the campus "Universidad Anahuac Mexico Norte" located in the area of Lomas Anahuac in Interlomas in Mexico City. The name refers to "the lake region that gave central place at the Aztec capital: Tenochtitlán, Central America's most populous and largest cultural development, where Mexico City now stands and in it, the university.

== Anahuac Network ==
The Anahuac University Network consists of the following institutions:

México:

- Universidad Anáhuac with eight campuses with this name and model of education:
  - Universidad Anáhuac México (México, D.F. – 1964)
  - Universidad Anáhuac Mayab (Mérida Yuc. – 1984)
  - Universidad Anáhuac Veracruz (Xalapa, Veracruz – 1993) (Córdoba, Veracruz – 2021)
  - Universidad Anáhuac Cancún (Cancún, Quintana Roo – 2000)
  - Universidad Anáhuac Oaxaca (Oaxaca, Oaxaca – 2000)
  - Universidad Anáhuac Puebla (Puebla, Puebla – 2003)
  - Universidad Anáhuac Querétaro (Querétaro, Querétaro – 2005)
  - Instituto de Estudios Superiores de Tamaulipas (Tampico Tamps. – 1974)
  - Instituto Superior de Estudios para la Familia "Juan Pablo II" (With locations in Mexico City, Guadalajara, Monterrey and Leon – 1991)

Spain:

- Universidad Francisco de Vitoria (Madrid – 1993)

Italy:

- Università Pontificia Regina Apostolorum (Rome – 1993)
- European University of Rome (Rome – 2004)

United States:

- Divine Mercy University (Arlington, Virginia – 1999)

Chile:

- Universidad Finis Terrae (Santiago – founded in 1988 and integrated into the international network in 1999)
