= List of Lebanese people in Mexico =

This is a list of notable individuals born in Mexico of Lebanese ancestry or people of Lebanese and Mexican dual nationality who live or lived in Mexico.

== Arts and entertainment ==
Actors

- Dario Yazbek Bernal – actor, best known for his role as 'Julián de la Mora' in Netflix's The House of Flowers.
- Bichir family
  - Alejandro Bichir – actor
  - Bruno Bichir – actor
  - Demián Bichir – Academy Award-nominated actor
  - Odiseo Bichir – actor
- Capulina – actor
- Edy Ganem – actress, starred in Devious Maids
- Mauricio Garcés – actor
- Astrid Hadad – actress
- Salma Hayek – Academy Award-nominated actress
- Emile Kuri – set decorator and two-time Academy Award winner
- Bárbara de Regil – actress
- Emeraude Toubia – actress

Music

- Susana Harp – singer
- Carlos Jiménez Mabarak – musician
- Peso Pluma – singer

Visual arts

- Charlotte Yazbek – sculptor

Writers

- Jaime Sabines – poet

Sports

- José Abella – professional footballer
- Jerónimo Amione – professional footballer
- Salim Chartouni – former footballer, current sports TV analyst.
- Taufic Guarch – professional footballer
- Emilio Hassan – professional footballer
- Gibran Lajud – professional footballer
- Miguel Layún – professional footballer
- Miguel Sabah – professional footballer

== Business ==
- Pépé Abed – businessman
- Arturo Elias Ayub – businessman
- Alfredo Harp Helú – businessman; cousin of Carlos Slim Helú
- Kamel Nacif Borge – businessman
- Carlos Slim Domit – businessman; son of Carlos Slim Helú
- Carlos Slim Helú – businessman; at or near the top of lists of the world's wealthiest people since 2005
- Jean Succar Kuri – businessman

== Politics ==
- Alfredo Elías Ayub – General Director of the Comisión Federal de Electricidad
- Jorge Estefan Chidiac – politician
- María de Lourdes Dieck-Assad – economist of Belgian and Levantine descent
- Omar Fayad – politician
- Humberto Hernandez-Haddad, Mexican lawyer, former Federal Senator and Congressman
- Jesús Murillo Karam – politician
- José Antonio Meade Kuribreña – politician
- Ricardo Dájer Nahum – politician
- Alfonso Petersen – mayor of Guadalajara
- Daniel Karam Toumeh – director of the Mexican Social Security Institute (Instituto Mexicano del Seguro Social, IMSS)
- José Yunes Zorrilla – politician of Lebanese ancestry

== Sports ==
- José Abella – soccer player
- Jerónimo Amione – soccer player
- Raúl Chabrand – soccer coach
- Bruce El-mesmari – soccer player
- Taufic Guarch – soccer player
- Emilio Hassan – soccer player
- Miguel Layún – soccer player
- Daniel Lajud – soccer player
- Gibrán Lajud – soccer player
- Miguel Sabah – soccer player
- José Sulaimán – President of the World Boxing Council
- Mauricio Sulaimán – President of the World Boxing Council

== See also ==
- Arab Mexican
- Lebanon–Mexico relations
- List of Lebanese people
- List of Lebanese people (Diaspora)
