= Bichir (surname) =

Bichir is a surname. Notable people with the surname include:

- Alejandro Bichir, (fl. 1970) Mexican actor
- Bruno Bichir (born 1967), Mexican actor
- Demián Bichir (born 1963), Mexican actor
- Odiseo Bichir (born 1960), Mexican actor
