= Lebanese Mexicans =

Mexican citizens of Lebanese origin

Lebanese Mexicans libano-mexicano مكسيكي لبناني
Total population
- Mexicans of Lebanese descent: c. 100,000 – 600,000

Regions with significant populations
- Nuevo León, Yucatán, Veracruz, Coahuila, Jalisco, Sinaloa, Mexico City, Baja California, Guanajuato, Chihuahua, Durango, Puebla

Languages
- Mexican Spanish and Lebanese Arabic

Religion
- Predominantly Christianity, minority Islam

Related ethnic groups
- Lebanese and Lebanese diaspora

Lebanese Mexicans refers to Mexican citizens of Lebanese origin.

Although Lebanese Mexicans made up less than 5% of the total immigrant population in Mexico during the 1930s, they constituted half of the immigrant economic activity.

Lebanese influence in Mexican culture can be seen most particularly in Mexican cuisine, where they have introduced many foods and dishes and created their own recipes such as al pastor.

Interethnic marriage in the Lebanese community, regardless of religious affiliation, is very high; most have only one parent with Lebanese ethnicity. As a result, some of them speak Arabic fluently. But the majority, especially among younger generations, speak Spanish as first language.

Carlos Slim, formerly the richest man in the world, is an example of Lebanese Mexican success in Mexican society.

== Migration history ==
Lebanese immigration to Mexico started in the 19th and early 20th centuries. In 1892, the first Lebanese arrived in Mexico from Beirut in French ships to Mexican ports such as Puerto Progreso, Veracruz and Tampico. At that time, Lebanon was not an independent nation; the territory was held by the Ottoman Empire and later became a French protectorate. Roughly 100,000 Arabic-speakers settled in Mexico during this time period. They settled in significant numbers in Yucatán, Veracruz, Puebla, Mexico City and the northern part of the country (mainly in the states of Baja California, Nuevo León, Sinaloa, Chihuahua, Coahuila, and Durango, as well as the city of Tampico and Guadalajara).

Although Lebanese people made up less than 5% of the total immigrant population in Mexico during the 1930s, they constituted half of the immigrant economic activity. During the 1948 Arab–Israeli War and the Jun 1967 war, thousands of Lebanese left Lebanon and went to Mexico, first arriving in Veracruz.

Another concentration of Lebanese-Mexicans is in Baja California facing the US–Mexican border, especially in the cities of Mexicali and Tijuana across from San Diego with a large Lebanese-American community (about 280,000), some of whose families have relatives in Mexico. Theresa Alfaro-Velcamp argues that the Porfiriato era, 1876-1910, promoted immigration from the Middle East. However the revolution of 1910-20 saw a surge in xenophobia and nationalism based on "mestizaje." The Middle Eastern community divided into the economically prosperous Lebanese Mexicans who took pride in a distinct Lebanese-Mexican identity, while the downscale remainder often merged into the mestizo community.

== Lebanese culture in Mexico ==
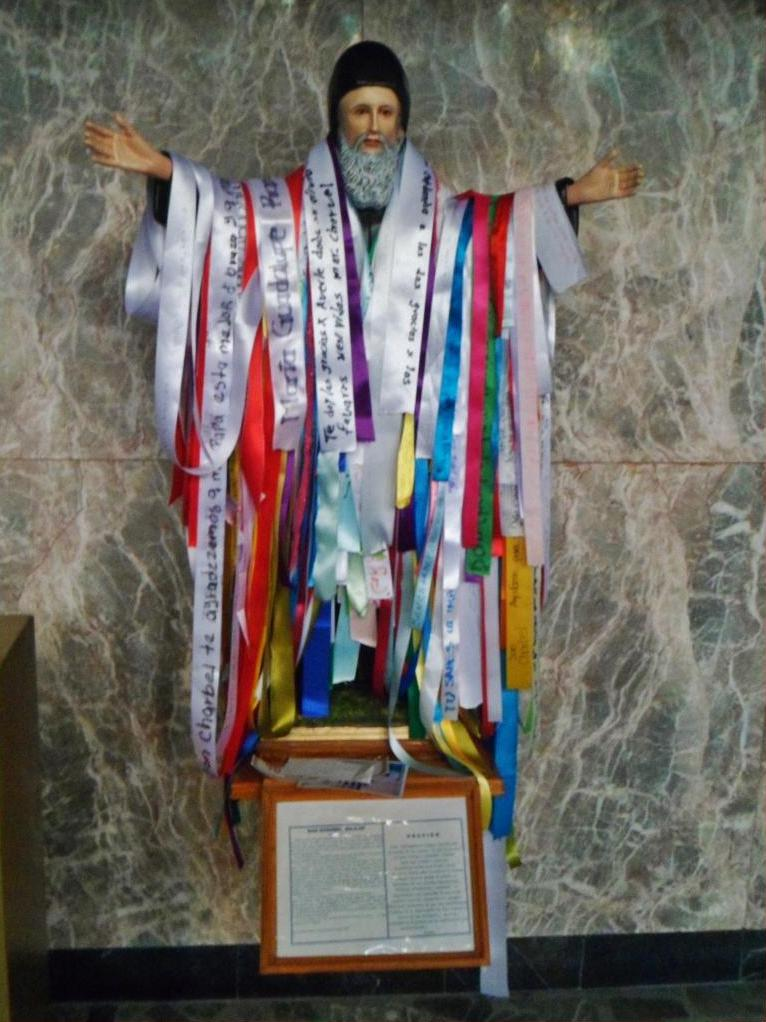
Image of Saint Charbel in a Roman Catholic church in San Luis Potosí, San Luis Potosí

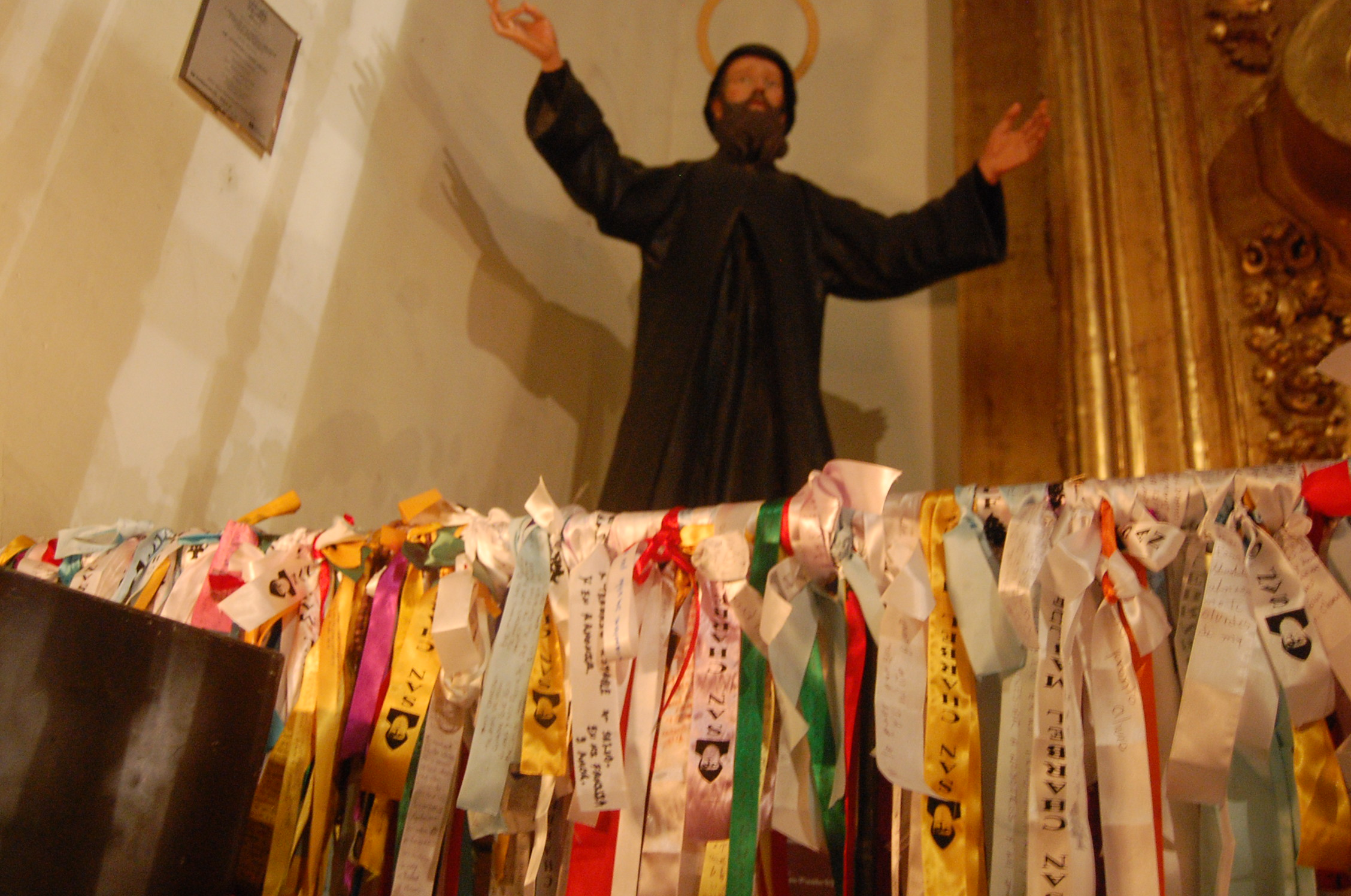
Statue with prayer requests at the Mexico City Metropolitan Cathedral

One Lebanese cultural tradition in Mexico itself is to place colored ribbons to the image of St. Charbel to ask some favor or some miracle (see Intercession of saints). The tradition arose in the Candelaria Church in Merced in the historic center of Mexico City.

The immigration of Lebanese to Mexico has influenced Mexican culture, in particular food, including introducing kibbeh and tabbouleh. By 1765, dates, which originated in North Africa and the Middle East, were introduced into Mexico by the Spaniards. The fusion between Arab and Mexican food has highly influenced the Yucatecan cuisine.

== Religion ==
The majority of Lebanese-Mexicans are Christians who belong to the Maronite, Roman Catholic, Eastern Orthodox and Melkite Catholic confessions. The Lebanese initially practiced Catholicism independently from other Mexicans, but learned to speak Spanish; Lebanese-Mexican children quickly joined the country's mainstream religious activities.

Since the early 1950s Lebanese Muslims settled in Mexico, in southern regions such as Chiapas, Oaxaca, Michoacan, and Guadalajara. They were responsible for the opening of the first mosque in Mexico, built in the city of Torreon, in Coahuila, and named Suraya Mosque.

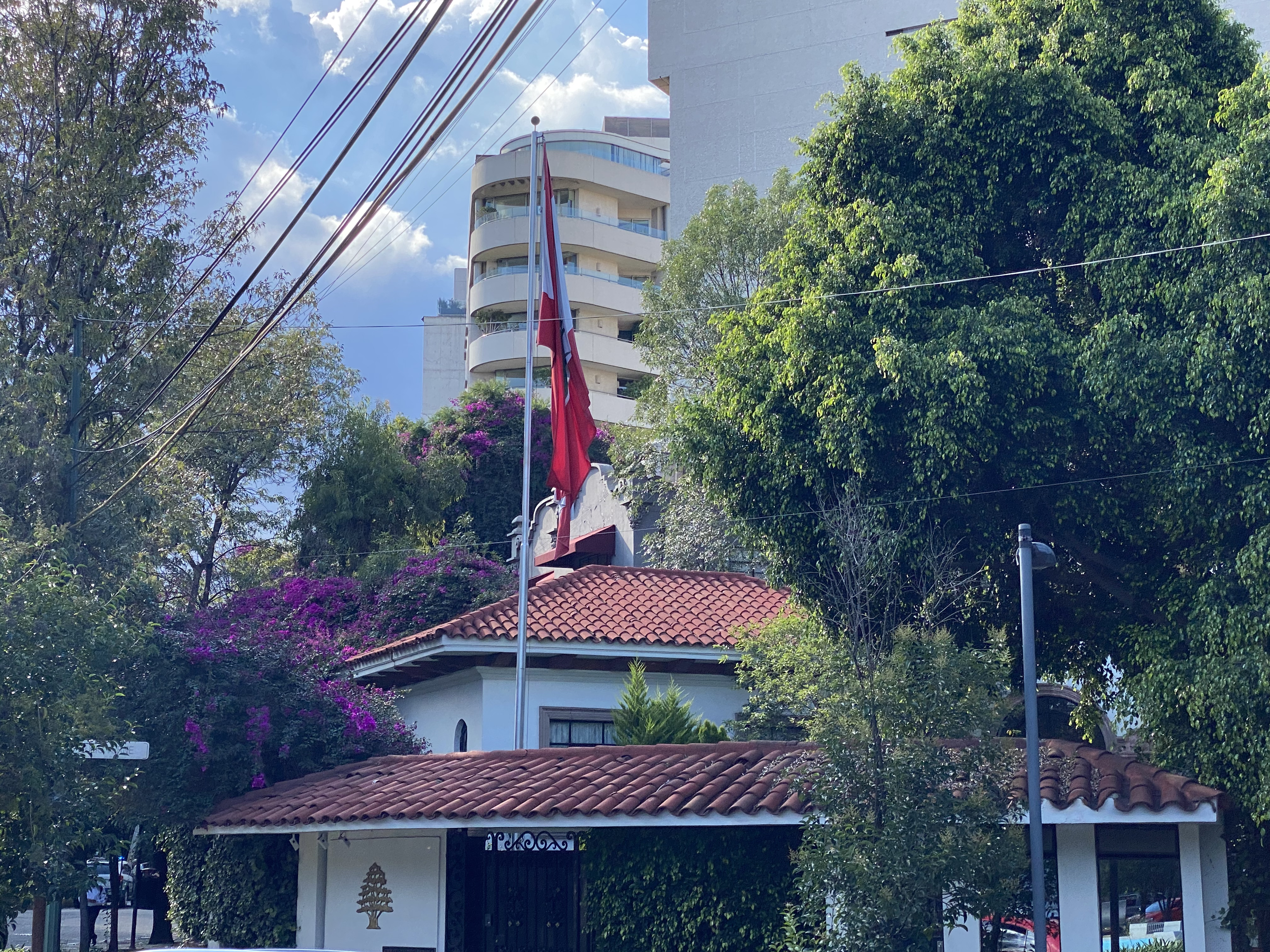
Lebanese Embassy in Mexico City

== Notable people ==
=== Mexicans with Lebanese origins ===
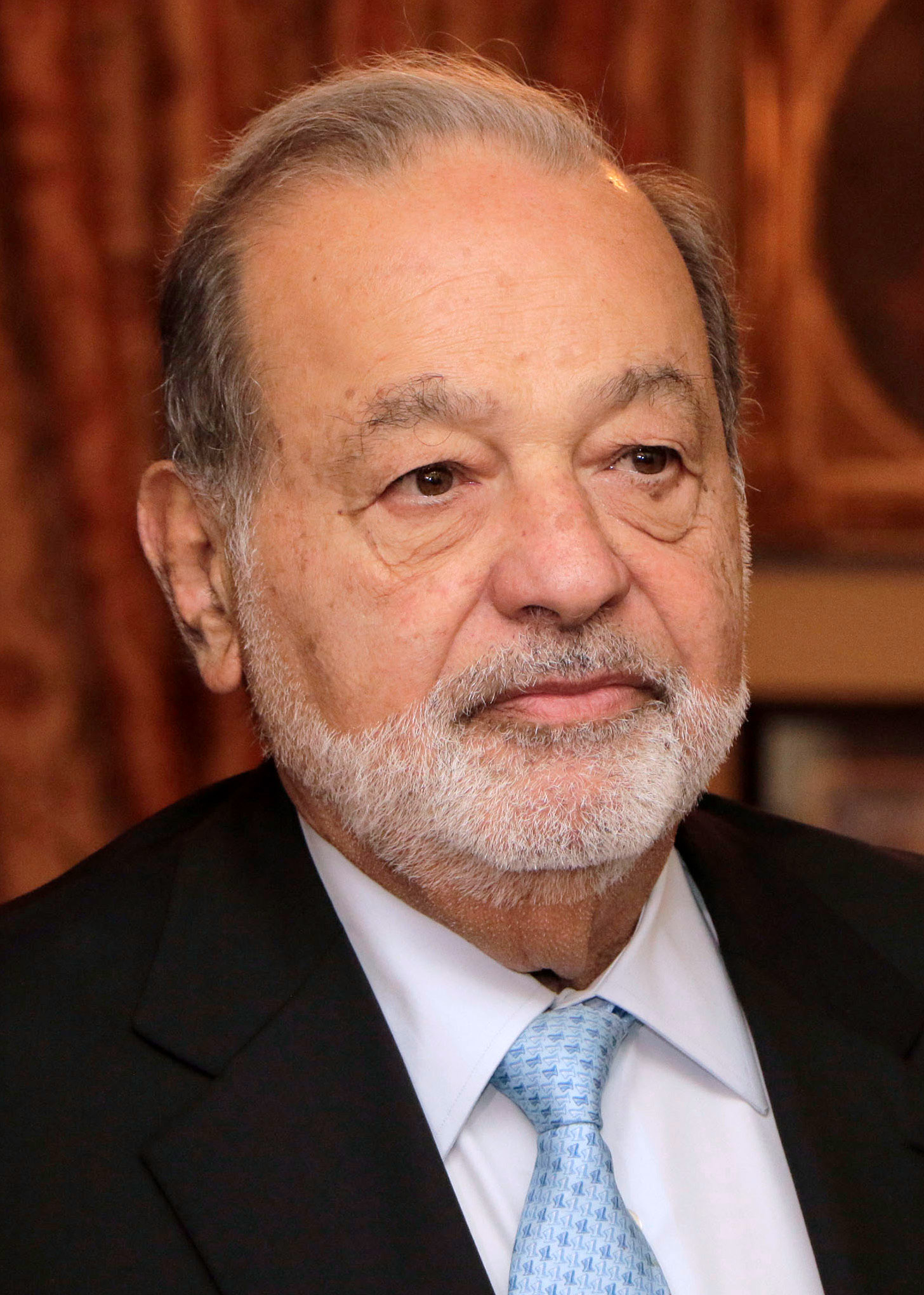
Carlos Slim Helú, business magnate

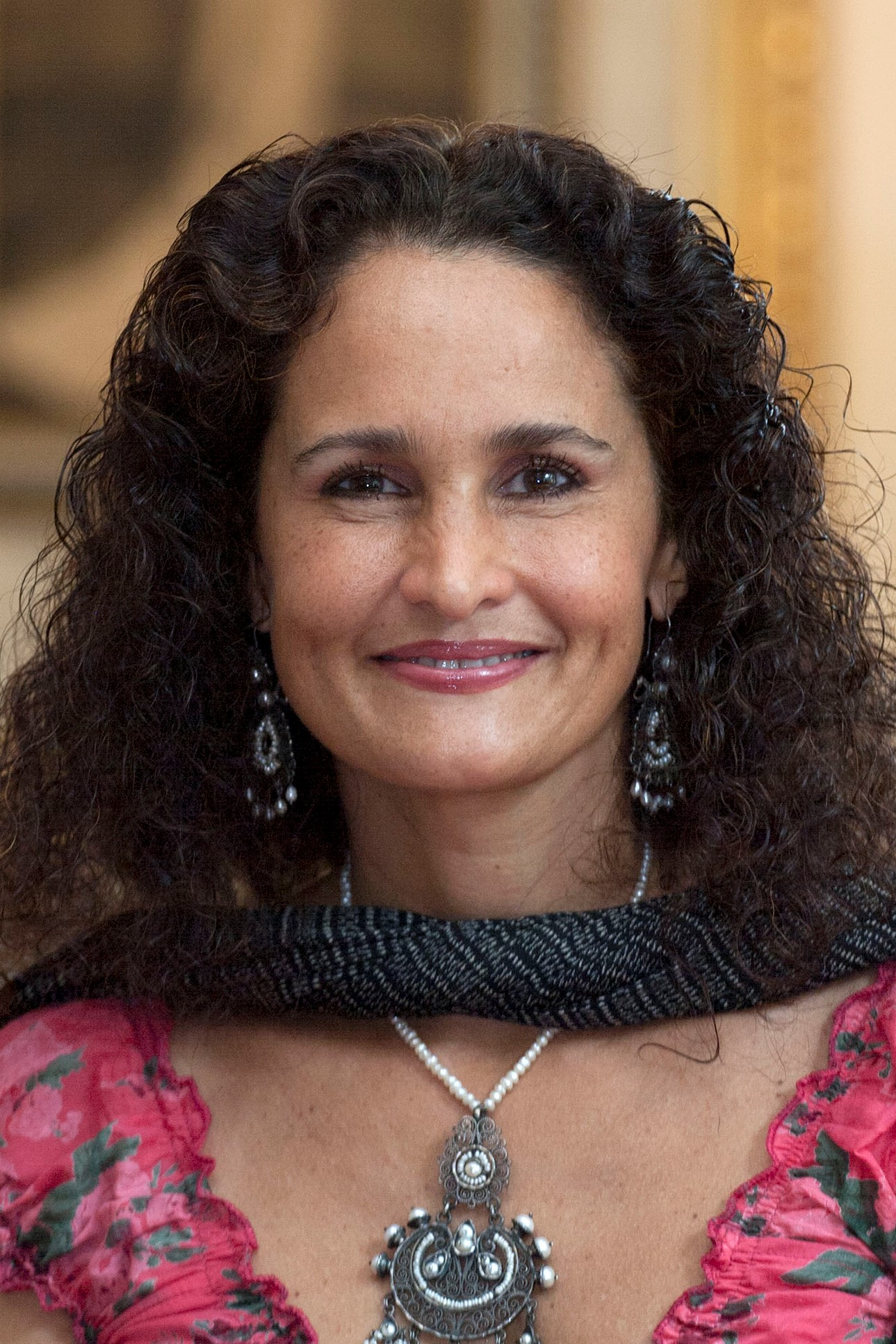
Susana Harp, politician and singer

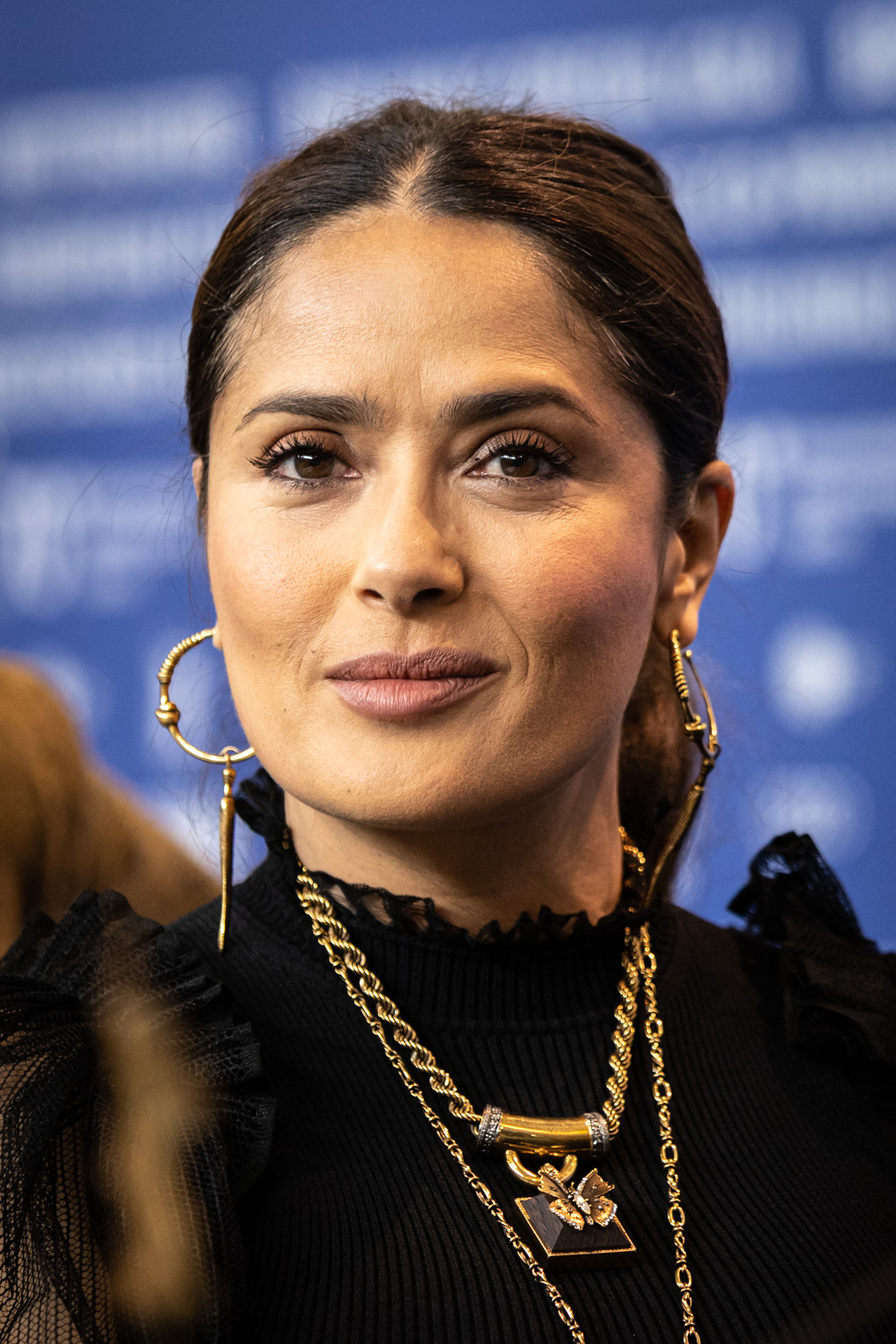
Salma Hayek, actress and producer

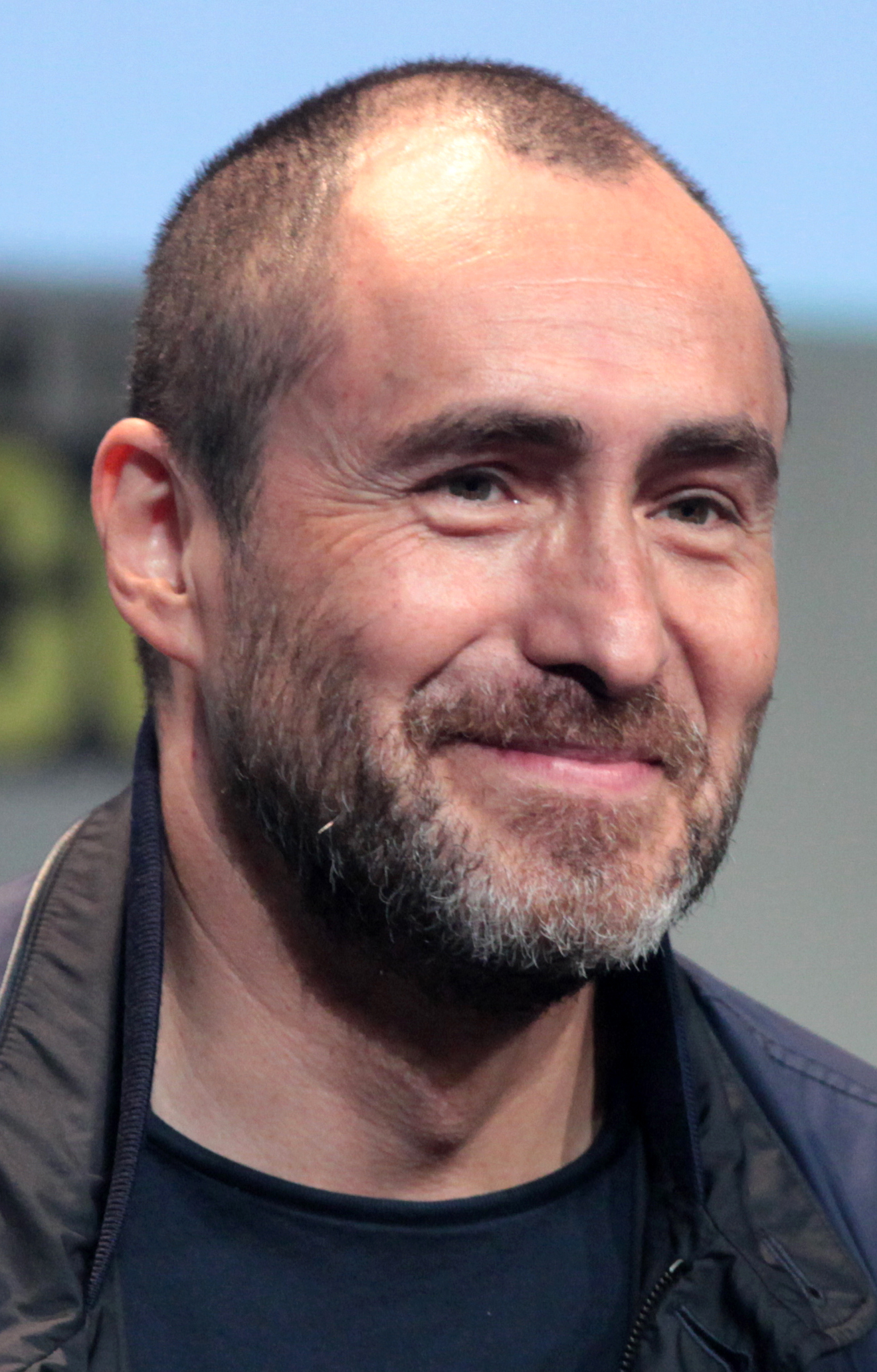
Demián Bichir, actor

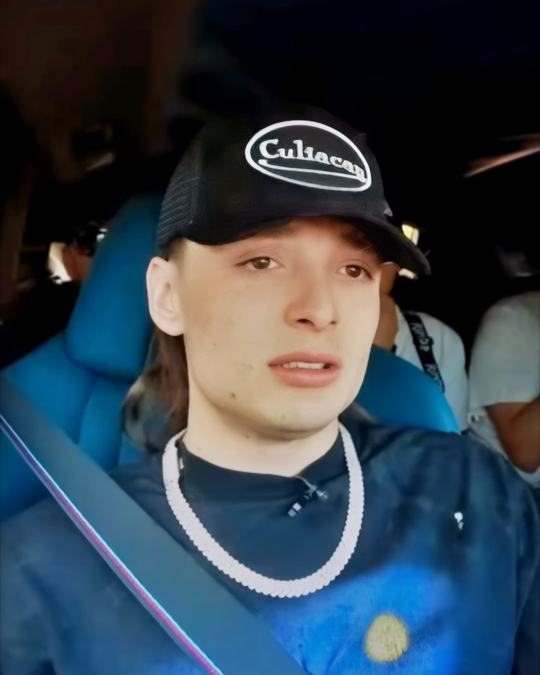
Peso Pluma, singer and musician

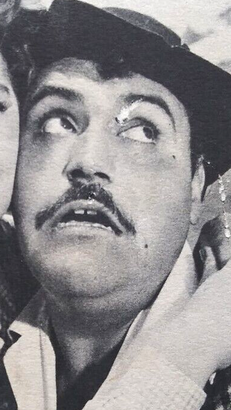
Gaspar Henaine, comedian and actor

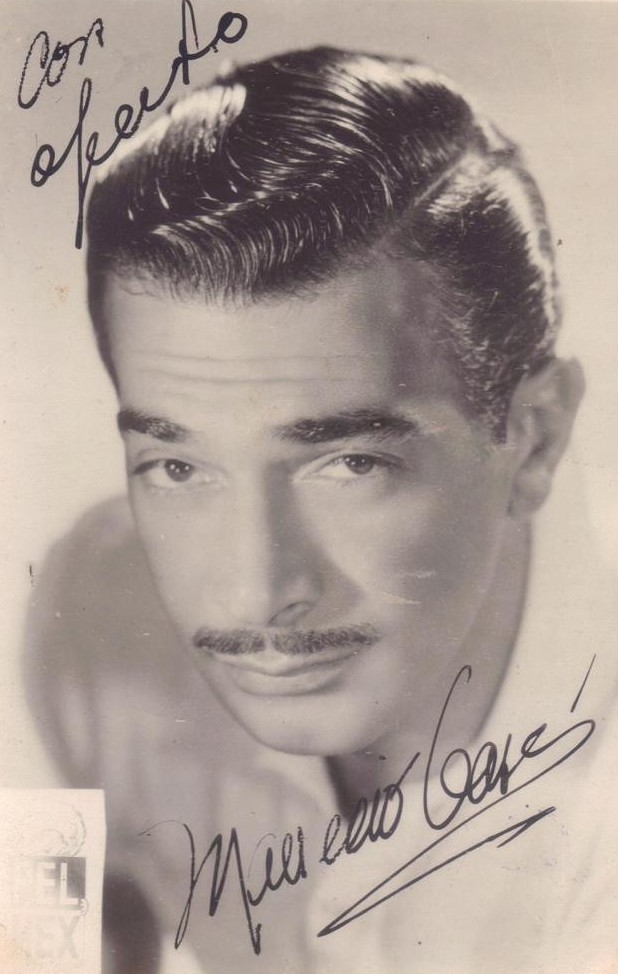
Mauricio Garcés, actor and comedian

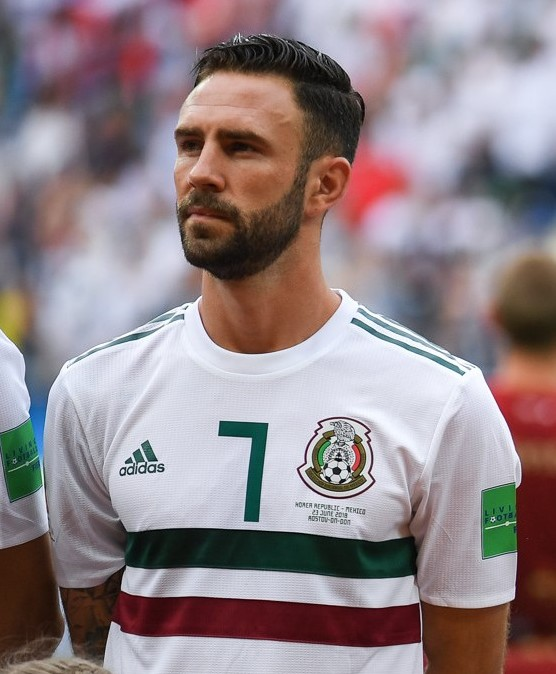
Miguel Layún, footballer

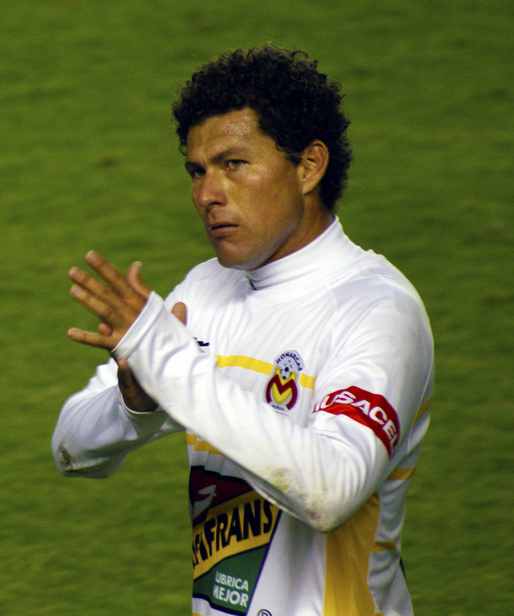
Miguel Sabah, footballer

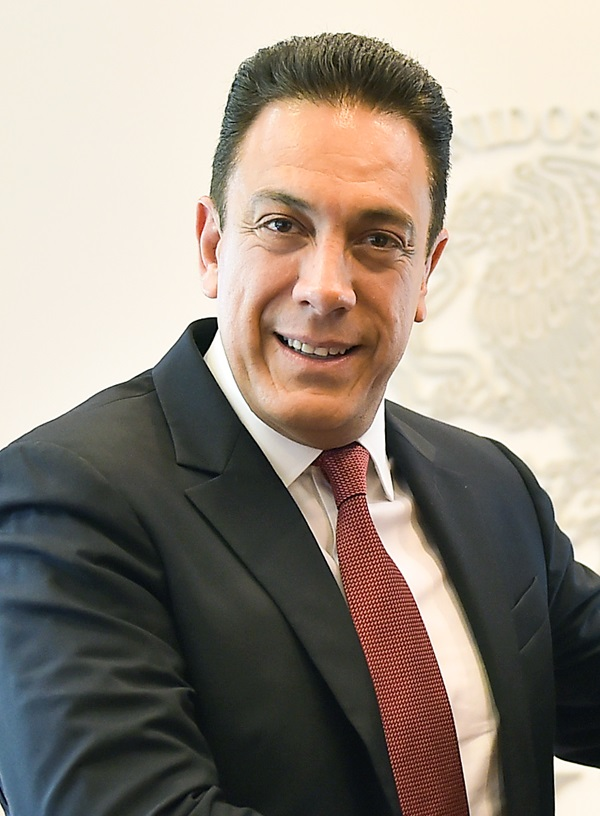
Omar Fayad, politician

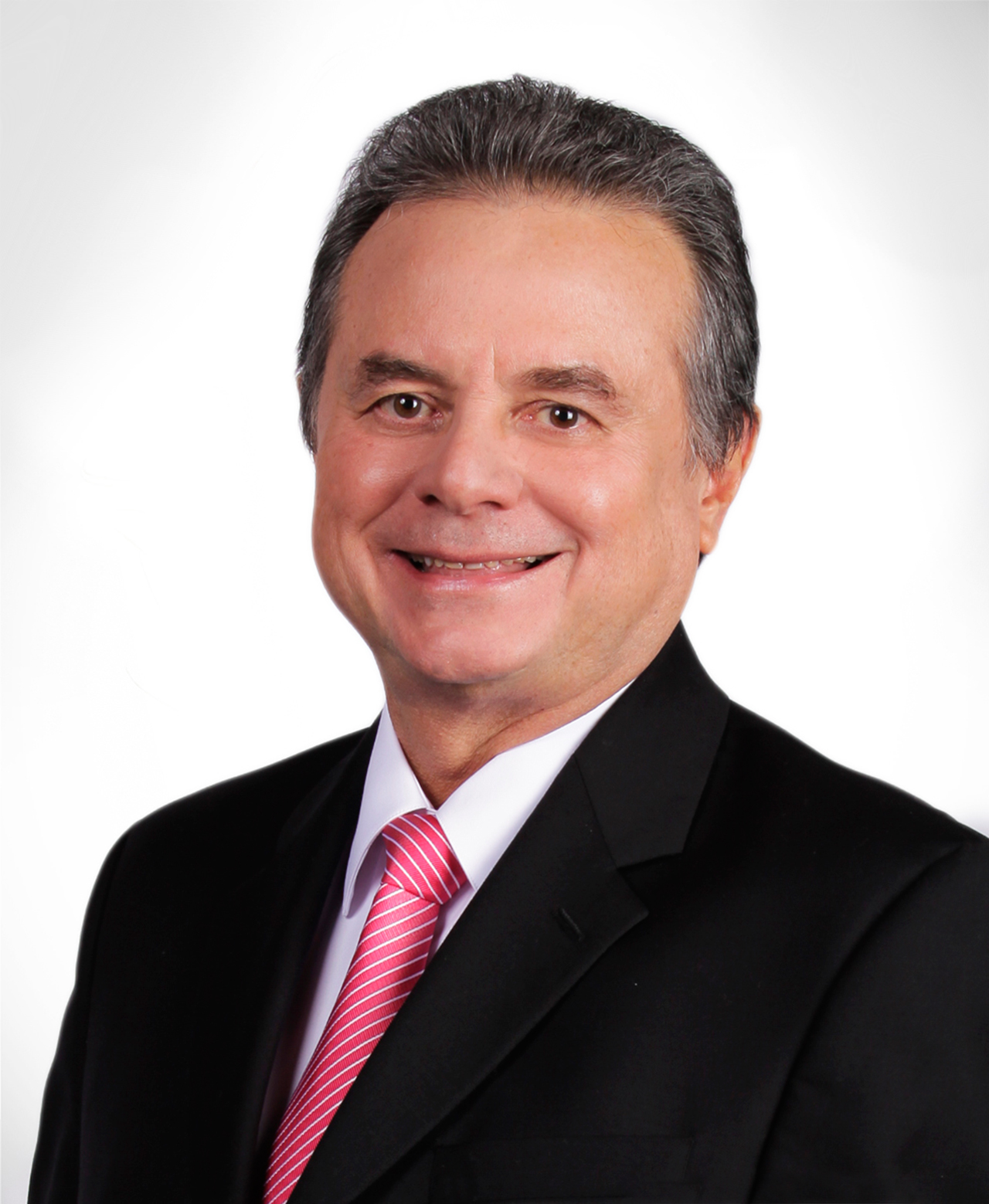
Pedro Coldwell, politician

== See also ==
- Immigration to Mexico
- Lebanon–Mexico relations
- Lebanese diaspora
- Lebanese Colombians
- Lebanese Brazilians
- Lebanese Argentines
