= Burn the Bridges =

- Spanish: Quemar las naves
- Directed by: Francisco Franco Alba
- Written by: Maria Reneé Prudencio; Francisco Franco Alba
- Produced by: Laura Imperiale; Maria Navarro; Francisco Franco Alba
- Starring: Irene Azuela; Ángel Onésimo Nevárez; Claudette Maillé
- Cinematography: Erika Licea
- Edited by: Sebastián Garza
- Music by: Alejandro Giacomán; Joselo Rangel
- Distributed by: Instituto Mexicano de Cinematografía (Imcine)
- Release date: October 2007
- Running time: 104 minutes
- Country: Mexico
- Language: Spanish

Burn the Bridges (Spanish: Quemar las naves) is a 2007 Mexican film directed by Francisco Franco Alba, from an original script co-written by Franco and actress Maria Reneé Prudencio. The film was shot in the Mexican state of Zacatecas and addresses issues such as self-assertion, loss, adolescence, and sexual relations. It officially premiered in October 2007 at the Festival Internacional de Cine de Morelia. The title refers to a widely known Mexican saying, which means "to cut all ties holding someone to something or someone"—something Hernán Cortés is believed to have done when he and his men set foot for the first time in continental America, in order to avoid mutiny or desertion during the Spanish conquest of the Aztec Empire.

== Plot ==
Elena (Irene Azuela) and Sebastián (Ángel Onésimo Nevárez) are a teenaged brother and sister who have been reunited at their home while looking after their ailing mother, singer Eugenia Díaz (Claudette Maille). Eugenia has been diagnosed with cancer and doesn't have long to live, and it has fallen to Elena and Sebastián to care for her in her last months, with Elena (who is older) spending her days with her mother while Sebastian goes to school and looks in on Eugenia in the evenings. Elena is obsessively caring for Sebastián, but while he loves his sister and mother, he seems detached from the affairs of his family. He's more drawn to his roughneck schoolmate Juan (Bernardo Benítez). As the reality of Eugenia's fate becomes clearer, Elena and Sebastián's confusion about love, mortality and family becomes more acute, and circumstances become even more muddled when they take in a boarder, Aurora (Jessica Segura), who falls in Sebastián's wealthy schoolmate Ismael (Ramón Valdez Urtiz).

== Cast ==
- Irene Azuela as Elena
- Ángel Onésimo Nevárez as Sebastián
- Claudette Maillé as Eugenia
- Bernardo Benítez as Juan
- Ramón Valdez Urtiz as Ismael
- Juan Carlos Barreto as Efraín
- Jessica Segura as Aurora
- Aida López as Chayo
- Alberto Estrella as Emilio
- Diana Bracho as Catalina

== Awards ==
The film won two Ariel Awards in 2008: for Best Actress (Irene Azuela) and for Best Original Music (Alejandro Giacomán, songs by Joselo Rangel). The film was also nominated for Best Art Design.
