= Maricruz Nájera =

Mexican actress

- Born: María de la Cruz Nájera Botello; Mexico City, Mexico
- Occupation: Actress
- Years active: 1970–present
- Spouse: Alejandro Bichir (m. 1959)
- Children: Odiseo Bichir; Demián Bichir; Bruno Bichir
- Family: Bichir family

María de la Cruz Nájera Botello (known as Maricruz Nájera) is a Mexican actress. She is the wife of Alejandro Bichir, and the mother of Odiseo, Demián and Bruno Bichir.

== Filmography ==
=== Telenovelas ===
- A que no me dejas (2015) .... Silvia
- Un Refugio para el Amor (2012) .... Matilde
- Rafaela (2011) .... Constanza
- Triunfo del amor (2010–2011) .... Tomasa Hernández
- Para volver a amar (2010–2011) .... Doña Confesión vda. de Bravo
- Las Vías del Amor (2002) .... Laura Albavera
- Amigas y rivales (2001) .... Camelia
- La usurpadora (1998) .... Emiliana
- Desencuentro (1997) .... Rosario
- Mi querida Isabel (1996) .... Jesusita
- Caminos cruzados (1994) .... Elsa
- Valentina (1993) .... Gloria Luque
- El abuelo y yo (1992) .... Madre Adoración
- María Mercedes (1992) .... Nana Cruz
- Madres egoístas (1991) .... Natalia Blinder
- Yo compro esa mujer (1990) .... Juliana
- Mi pequeña Soledad (1990)
- El extraño retorno de Diana Salazar (1988) .... Conchita
- Cuna de lobos (1986) .... vda. de Gutiérrez
- La fiera (1983) .... Angelina
- Por amor (1982) .... Julia
- Déjame vivir (1982) .... Josefina
- Los ricos también lloran (1979) .... María #2
- Viviana (1978) .... Nurse
- Mamá Campanita (1978) .... Martina
- Rina (1977) .... Nurse

=== Television series ===
- Los simuladores (2010) .... Tomasa
- Central de abasto (2009)
- Sexo y otros secretos (2007) .... Doña Cándida
- Mujer, casos de la vida real (1989) .... Paulina (Episode: "Suplantación")

=== Film ===
- Men with Guns (1997) .... Mujer rica
- La güera Chabela (1994)
- Amor a la medida (1993)
- El patrullero (1991) .... Sra. Rojas
- La gata Cristy (1990) .... Clotilde
- De la cabeza al cielo (1990)
- El patrullero 777 (1978)
- Canoa (1976)
- La muerte de Pancho Villa (1974)
- El principio (1973)
- Los días del amor (1972) .... Isaura
- Para servir a usted (1971)
- El quelite (1970)
- Emiliano Zapata (1970)
- El juego de Zuzanka (1970)
