= Alejandro Giacomán =

Mexican composer and recording engineer

Alejandro Giacomán is a Mexican composer and recording engineer. He studied at the Dick Grove School of Music in Los Angeles, California.

== Film music ==
Alejandro Giacomán has worked with several production companies in over 63 motion pictures. He has received two Ariel awards from the Mexican Academy of Cinematographic Arts and Sciences, one in 2008 for the score of Quemar las Naves (Burn the Bridges) (2007), directed by Francisco Franco Alba, performed by the Aguascalientes Symphonic Orchestra, and the second in 2011 for the score of Hidalgo: La historia jamás contada (Hidalgo, the untold story) (2010), directed by Antonio Serrano, and performed by the San Luis Potosí Symphonic Orchestra, along with three other nominations for La Mujer de Benjamín (Benjamin's Woman) (1992), Desiertos Mares (Deserted Seas) (1994) and En el Aire (On the air) (1995). Other noteworthy film scores include Matando Cabos (Killing Cabos) (2004), Volverte a ver (2008, nominated to PECIME's Diosa de Plata), El sueño de Iván (Ivan's Dream) (Spain, 2011), Morgana (2012, nominated to PECIME's Diosa de Plata), El efecto tequila (The Tequila effect) (2011, nominated in the Festival Pantalla de Cristal), Morelos (2012) and Obediencia Perfecta (2014).

== Other work ==
His credit as composer also appears in 15 Shorts, 21 documentaries, 18 television programs and series, among them Tony Tijuana (1991), Trece Miedos (Thirteen Fears) (2007), Cásate conmigo mi amor (Marry me my love) (2013), and Horario Estelar (Prime Time) (2023), more than 94 commercials and 18 theatre plays among them Un tranvía llamado deseo (A streetcar named desire) (1996), Todos eran mis hijos (All my sons) (2009), Juegos siniestros (Sleuth) (2010) and Misery (2011). He also has participated in more than a hundred music albums of diverse generes with various functions as producer, keyboard player, arranger, composer, engineer, editor, interactive track programmer and mastering engineer.

== Discography ==
Title	Year
Ciudades del México Antiguo (Cities from ancient Mexico)	(1998)
Quemar las Naves (Burn the Bridges)	(2008)
Volverte a ver	(2008)
Hidalgo: La historia jamás contada (Hidalgo, the untold story)	(2010)
Cuatro casas allá (string quartet)	(2013)
Morelos	(2013)
Obediencia perfecta (Perfect Obedience)	(2014)
Por mis bigotes	(2015)
Amelia	(2022)
Piano Scenes	(2022)
Horario Estelar (Prime Time)	(2023)

== La próxima vez que vengas (Book title in spanish) ==
In November 2018, during the International Book Fair in Guadalajara, at the Department of Culture's stand, he presented his fiction novel La próxima vez que vengas (Next time around), which unfolds in the 1980s, throughout the early stages of his musical career as a Rock & Roll performer in Mexico.
