= Hecho en China =

- Directed by: Gabriel Guzmán Sánchez
- Screenplay by: Gabriel Guzmán Sánchez
- Produced by: Alejandra García; Antonio Urdapilleta
- Starring: Odiseo Bichir; Víctor Hernández; Carlos Cobos; Eduardo España; Claudia Ramírez; Mario Zaragoza; Omar Fierro
- Cinematography: Alejandro Cantú
- Edited by: Gabriel García Campillo
- Music by: Rodrigo Montfort
- Production companies: Canal 22 (México); IMAGYX Entertainment; Instituto Mexicano de Cinematografía (IMCINE)
- Distributed by: Instituto Mexicano de Cinematografía (IMCINE) (worldwide)
- Release dates: March 7, 2012 (Guadalajara International Film Festival, Mexico); February 28, 2013 (Cinequest Film Festival, United States)
- Running time: 91 min.
- Country: Mexico
- Language: Spanish

Hecho en China (literally: Made In China) is a 2012 Mexican road comedy-drama film written and directed by Gabriel Guzmán Sánchez, and starring Odiseo Bichir. It is produced by Alejandra Garcia and Antonio Urdapilleta for IMAGYX Entertainment, Canal 22 and IMCINE. It was filmed in Mexico and first released on March 7, 2012, at the Guadalajara International Film Festival.

== Plot ==
Marcos Marquez (Bichir) has just turned 50. He's a serious, respectful, knowing man living in Tijuana, owner of a Chinese restaurant he inherited from his parents. But Marcos isn't thrilled about celebrating his birthday because it reminds him of his vanishing youth dreams.
But this time it's different: he's just received an invitation to Clara's wedding, the only girlfriend he ever had, as well as threats from a Chinese mobster who's forcing him to sell his business.
Since he hates flying, Marcos decides to drive to the wedding in Monterrey, Nuevo León (a city on the opposite side of the country). What he doesn't know is that Fernando (Hernández), his 18-year-old rebellious employee, is riding in his trunk.
When Marcos finds Fernando, they're forced to ride together, pushing Marcos to experience things he's never had the courage to do, realizing that even though he's 50, he's still capable of making his dreams come true.

== Cast ==
- Odiseo Bichir as Marcos Márquez
- Víctor Hernández as Fernando Fernández
- Carlos Cobos as Odiseo
- Eduardo España as George
- Claudia Ramírez as Clara
- Mario Zaragoza as Tony (the mechanic)
- Omar Fierro as Homero Garza
- Norma Angélica as Mrs. Gilda
- Taka as Yang Li
- David Loji as Juan Mao
- David Colorado as Nacho
- David Arauza as Policía de Caminos
- Eduardo Cantú as Marcos (11 years-old)
- Nancy Zhou as Pei-Pei
- Francisco Colmenero as the Narrator

== Production ==
Hecho en China is one of three winning films of the Primera Convocatoria de Apoyo a la Producción de Largometraje Telefilm Digital (First Digital TV Feature Film Production Competition) organized by Canal 22 (a television station operated by the Mexican Secretariat of Culture) and FOPROCINE (Film Production Fund) through IMCINE (the Mexican Film Institute), to promote the production of Mexican cinema.

The film has the sad distinction of having one of the last screen appearances of actor Carlos Cobos, an Ariel Award winner for the film Pastorela (2011), who died months before the film's premiere.

== Reception ==
The film received favorable reviews through the festival circuit. Brazilian critics compared some of its sequences with films such as Amélie and the Argentinian Chinese Take-Away (Un cuento chino).

== Distinctions ==
=== Awards ===
Year	Festival	Category	Result	Ref
2013	Jaipur International Film Festival (Jaipur, India)	Best original screenplay	Won	

=== Festivals ===
Year	Festival	Category	Ref
2013	9º CINEMAISSI Finland Latinamerican Film Festival (Helsinki, Finland)	Official selection	
2013	9th Santiago International Film Festival (Santiago, Chile)	World Vision Selection	
2013	Premios Tal (Montevideo, Uruguay)	Finalist, Producción de Unitario	
2013	SAFILM - San Antonio Film Festival (San Antonio, Texas, United States)	Special screening	
2013	8th Sinemardin International Film Festival (Mardin, Turkey)	Official selection	
2013	11th Annual Riverside International Film Festival (Riverside, California, United States)	Official selection	
2013	CINERAMABC Film Festival (Balneário Camboriú, Brazil)	Official selection	
2013	Sonoma International Film Festival (Sonoma, California, United States)	LatinAmerican Cinema Selection	
2013	CINEQUEST (San Jose, California, United States)	Official selection	
2012	8º Monterrey International Film Festival (Monterrey, Mexico)	Official selection	
2012	27º Guadalajara International Film Festival (Guadalajara, Mexico)	Special Screening	
