= El Santos vs. la Tetona Mendoza =

2012 film

- Film poster
- Directed by: Alejandro Lozano
- Screenplay by: Augusto Mendoza
- Produced by: Fernando de Fuentes; Lynn Fainchtein; José C. García de Letona; Paco Arriagada Cuadriello
- Starring: Daniel Giménez Cacho; José María Yazpik; Héctor Jiménez; Regina Orozco
- Edited by: Camilo Abadía
- Music by: Camilo Froideval; Tito Fuentes
- Production companies: Peyote Films; Ánima Estudios
- Distributed by: Videocine (Mexico); Pantelion Films (United States)
- Release dates: November 30, 2012 (Mexico); June 10, 2013 (AIAFF)
- Running time: 96 minutes
- Country: Mexico
- Language: Spanish
- Budget: $2.3 million
- Box office: MX$12.49 million (US$0.9 million)

El Santos vs. la Tetona Mendoza (lit. 'The Saints vs. the Busty Mendoza') is a 2012 Mexican adult animated action-adventure black comedy film based on the comic strip series by José Ignacio Solórzano and Trino Camacho (also known as "Jis y Trino").

The film features an ensemble voice cast of Daniel Giménez Cacho, José María Yazpik, Héctor Jiménez, Regina Orozco, and Cheech Marin. It is produced by Ánima Estudios under its adult label Átomo Films and distributed by Videocine.

It was released in Mexico on 30 November 2012.

== Plot ==
Santos suffers from a divorce from his wife, a loud, thuggish, and voluptuous woman named Tetona Mendoza (known for her large breasts, or "chichis", and her tomboyish attitude), while the people live and work with the group of regenerative zombies in Sahuayo, which is something that Santos conceived as a get-rich-quick scheme as a last-ditch attempt to rid himself of his depression. When Tetona arrives, she orders Santos to kill the zombies. Santos and his police officer friend Cabo Valdivia learn that if anyone kills all zombies will become the town's savior. Santos challenges Killer Peyote to make sure who will win the love for Tetona. Santos fails to kill the zombies, but Peyote uses a truck full of mariachis to lure them through the canyon cliff. Despite Santos' failure, the officers, led by El Jefe, inform him about the town's abnormal situation. Turns out, thanks to Santos and Peyote’s ill-mannered ways of getting rid of the zombies, the whole of Mexico has gone bankrupt, and every economy has collapsed, as the zombies were the ones keeping the city’s economy afloat. However, Tetona’s empire is the only economy that is standing, which means that she and her goons can do whatever they want with the city, which causes Tetona to rise to power and become Mexico’s president for life. Following her rise to power as president, Tetona summons a female group of aliens, called “Las Poquianchis”, from outer space as a way to “keep the peace in the town” and get Mexico back on its feet. Meanwhile, Santos, Cabo and Peyote avoid them and Tetona’s wrath, and they wander around the outskirts of Michoacán. They hide in an abandon science room, where Santos and Cabo inspect the remains of the zombie virus on the plate. It is later destroyed by Peyote, whom the aliens recruited, revealing that Peyote has been working as a mole for Tetona’s empire. It is here that Tetona’s goons imprison more male adults alongside Santos and Cabo and force the female ones to work at the strip club Tetona's Palace, where it’s revealed that Tetona has established a new class system in which men are treated as lower-class citizens and are forced to do hard labor, whilst the women are treated as upper-class citizens and can do whatever they like, including treating the men like trash. Santos and his captured friends are forced to stay in the city’s established “male re-education camps”, led by the Poquianchis and a rat girl named Maruca, where harmful and violent methods are used on the men in order to cleanse them of their “disgusting” behaviors (such as urinating while splashing the toilet seat, refusing to change the toilet paper, and refusing to share a remote). Cabo, revealing to be one of the zombies, asks Santos to protect him and the zombies, before the decontaminated population can annihilate them. Thinking of a way to escape, Santos and his friends challenge Maruca and her goons to a game of soccer; Santos’ team win the first round, but the others plan to escape. After losing the game in the second round, Santos and his friends escape from camp, being rescued by saddlers, led by their leader, the Black Horsemen (“El Charro Negro” in Spanish). After Santos uses DNA cell samples to spread the infection for everyone and revive the zombie population within a secret men’s hideout, he and his allies dress as rich bankers and go to the palace to confront Peyote. The fight at the strip club ensues, until Peyote slips on an avocado, suffers a bone fracture and ends up on a wheelchair, becoming a quadriplegic for life. Santos goes to the brothel’s bathroom, defecates the cannabis joint that he accidentally swallowed earlier, and suggests for Tetona to forgive him. The married couple have children and Mexico’s economy returns to normal.

== Voice cast ==
- Daniel Giménez Cacho as Santos, an unemployed wrestler and Tetona's husband
- José María Yazpik as Killer Peyote, Santos' drug dealing rival
- Héctor Jiménez as Cabo Valdivia, Santos' police friend and one of the zombies
- Regina Orozco as Tetona Mendoza, Santos' wife
- Guillermo del Toro as Gamborimbo Ponx, Santos' talking orange
- Cheech Marin as the Black Horseman

Other voice actors include Joaquín Cosío, Jesús Ochoa, Andrés Bustamante, Irene Azuela, Dolores Heredia, Rocío Verdejo, Julieta Venegas, Cecilia Suárez, and Bruno, Demián, and Odiseo Bichir.

== Release ==
The film was released in Mexico on 30 November 2012. It was shown at the Annecy International Film Festival on 10 June 2013.

=== Box office ===
The film opened at #6 at the box office, earning $3.6 million MXN ($0.28 million USD).
