= Hidalgo: la historia jamás contada =

- Theatrical release poster
- Directed by: Antonio Serrano
- Written by: Antonio Serrano; Leo Eduardo Mendoza
- Story by: Leo Eduardo Mendoza
- Produced by: María de Lourdes García Rivera; Luis Urquiza Mondragón
- Starring: Demián Bichir; Ana de la Reguera; Cecilia Suárez; Raúl Mendéz; Miguel Rodarte; Andrés Palacios
- Cinematography: Emiliano Villanueva
- Music by: Alejandro Giacomán
- Production companies: Astillero Films; 20th Century Fox; Bi100; IMCINE; CONACULTA
- Distributed by: 20th Century Fox
- Release date: September 16, 2010
- Running time: 115 minutes
- Country: Mexico
- Language: Spanish
- Budget: $4.5 million

Hidalgo: la historia jamás contada (English: Hidalgo: The Untold Story) is a 2010 Mexican film directed by Antonio Serrano. It follows a Mexican leader Miguel Hidalgo y Costilla and his involvement in the Mexican War of Independence. It premiered in Mexico City on September 16, 2010.

== Plot ==
As punishment for his progressive ideas, the priest Miguel Hidalgo is forced to abandon his wife and children and sent by the ecclesiastical authority to a small town. There, in San Felipe Torres, he helps the local people and produces the stage play Tartuffe. He becomes an enemy of the traditional Puritan faction in the town for his liberal attitude and subversive tendencies.

== Cast ==
- Demián Bichir as Miguel Hidalgo y Costilla
- Ana de la Reguera as Josefina
- Cecilia Suárez as Amadita
- Miguel Rodarte as José Santos
- Flavio Medina as Mariano Abasolo
- Carolina Politi as Domínguez Beatus
- Andrés Palacios as José María Morelos y Pavón
- Juan Carlos Colombo as Bishop
- Plutarco Haza as Spanish captive
- Odiseo Bichir as Master of Rhetoric
- Raúl Mendéz as Ignacio Allende
- Marco Antonio Treviño as Abad and Queipo
- Silvia Eugenia Derbéz as Manuela Pichardo
- Néstor Rodulfo as Moroccan
- Pablo Viña as Ángel Abella
- Juan Ignacio Aranda as José
- José Antonio Gaona as López
- Yurem Rojas as Young Hidalgo

== Production ==
Serrano was prompted to make a film about the Mexican War of Independence following its bicentenary celebrations in 2010.

The film was shot on location in Guanajuato, San Luis Potosí and Michoacán.

== Release and reception ==
On its release date, 500 copies of film were released in cinemas throughout Mexico. 20th Century Fox's vice-president for Latin America, Eduardo Echevarria, said: "We're talking about one of the biggest releases of all time in terms of number of copies, with a strong campaign behind it."

Bichir won the Colon de Plata award for Best Actor at the Festival de Cine Iberoamericano de Huelva for his portrayal of Miguel Hidalgo.

== Music ==
The music of the film was composed by Alejandro Giacomán.
