= Lebanon–Mexico relations =

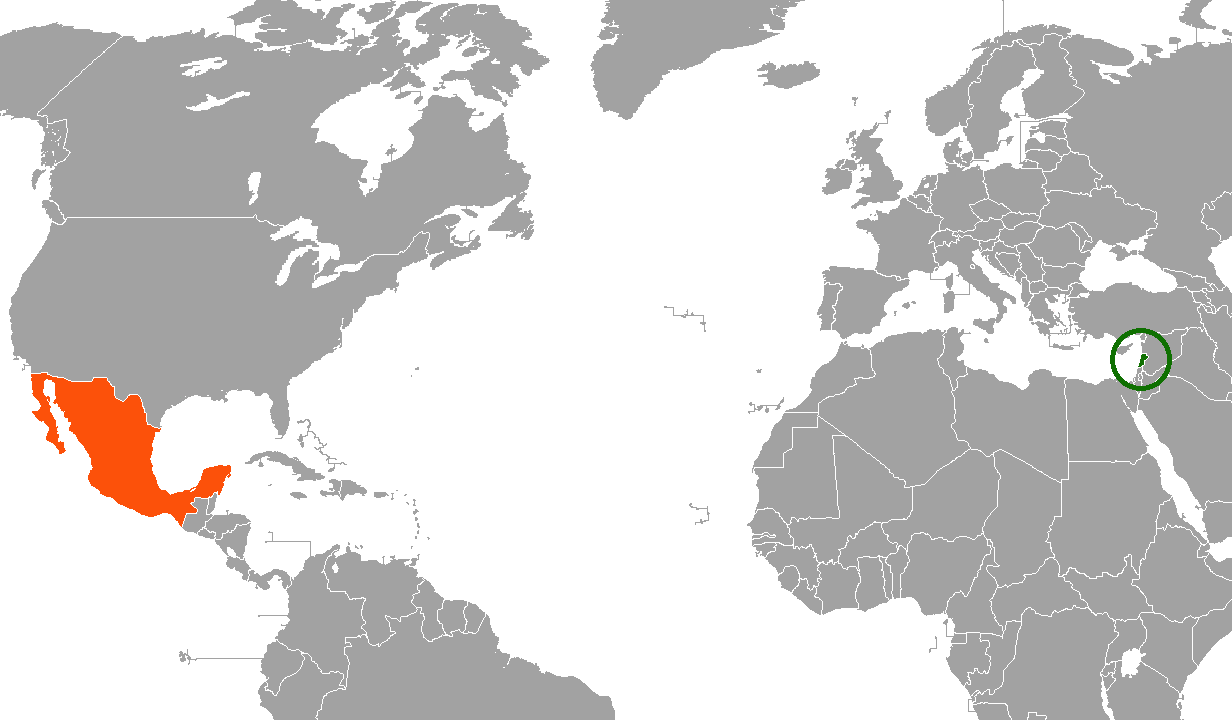

- Lebanon: Mexico

The nations of Lebanon and Mexico established diplomatic relations in 1945. Both nations enjoy friendly relations, the importance of which centers on the history of Lebanese immigration to Mexico. Both nations are members of the Group of 24 and the United Nations.

== History ==
Relations between Mexico and Lebanon stretch further before their official establishment of diplomatic relations. Beginning in 1878, several thousand Lebanese migrants (primarily Christian Maronites) left their homes, which at the time were under Ottoman occupation and later followed by French colonization; and immigrated to Mexico. Today, over 700,000 people in Mexico are of Lebanese origin.

After gaining independence from France in 1943; Lebanon and Mexico established diplomatic relations on 12 June 1945. In 1947, diplomatic missions were established in each country's capitals respectively, and ambassadors were appointed. In 1975, Lebanon experienced a civil war and for security reasons, the embassy of Mexico in Beirut closed in June 1982 to only re-open in 1996. Since then, Mexico has maintained an embassy in Lebanon throughout the various violent outbreaks in Lebanon and during Israeli attacks in the country.

In June 2000, Mexican Foreign Secretary Rosario Green became the first highest ranking Mexican official to visit Lebanon. In Lebanon, Foreign Minister Green met with Lebanese President Émile Lahoud. In September 2010, Lebanese President Michel Sleiman became the first Lebanese head-of-state to pay an official visit to Mexico and met with Mexican President Felipe Calderón.

In February 2015, Lebanese Foreign Minister Gebran Bassil arrived to Mexico to discuss the festivities for celebrating the 70th anniversary of diplomatic relations between both nations. In May of that same year, Mexican Foreign Minister José Antonio Meade paid an official visit to Lebanon.

In September 2015, Mexico provided military experts and two soldiers assigned to the United Nations Interim Force in Lebanon, based in the south of Lebanon and maintained 30 personnel in the country. In November 2015, the Patriarch of the Maronite Church, Bechara Boutros al-Rahi paid a visit to Mexico and met with Mexican President Enrique Peña Nieto.

In November 2017, Lebanese Foreign Minister Gebran Bassil paid a visit to Mexico to attend the Lebanese Diaspora Conference for Latin America and the Caribbean, held in Cancún.

In 2020, both nations celebrated 75 years of diplomatic relations. To celebrate the occasion, the National Museum of Beirut was illuminated in the colors of the Mexican flag.

== High-level visits ==
High-level visits from Lebanon to Mexico

- President Michel Sleiman (2010)
- Foreign Minister Ali Al Shami (2010)
- Foreign Minister Gebran Bassil (2015, 2017)

High-level visits from Mexico to Lebanon

- Foreign Secretary Rosario Green (2000)
- Foreign Undersecretary Lourdes Aranda (2010)
- Foreign Secretary José Antonio Meade (2015)

== Bilateral relations ==
Both nations have signed several bilateral agreements such as a Memorandum of Understanding and Cooperation between the Mexican Secretariat of Foreign Affairs and the Lebanese Ministry of Foreign Affairs (2000); Agreement of Scientific and Technical Cooperation (2000); Agreement of Educational and Cultural Cooperation (2000); Memorandum of Understanding on consultations between the Mexican Secretariat of Foreign Affairs and the Lebanese Ministry of Foreign Affairs and Emigrants (2000); and a Memorandum of Understanding and Cooperation between the Mexican Secretariat for Tourism and the Lebanese Ministry of Tourism (2008).

== Monuments to the Lebanese Migrant ==
Throughout Lebanon and Mexico, there are several Monuments to the Lebanese Migrant (Monumentos al libanés migrante); and many of these statues are present in major Mexican cities in recognition of the Lebanese diaspora in the country. Some cities in Mexico also name their streets in honor of Lebanon.

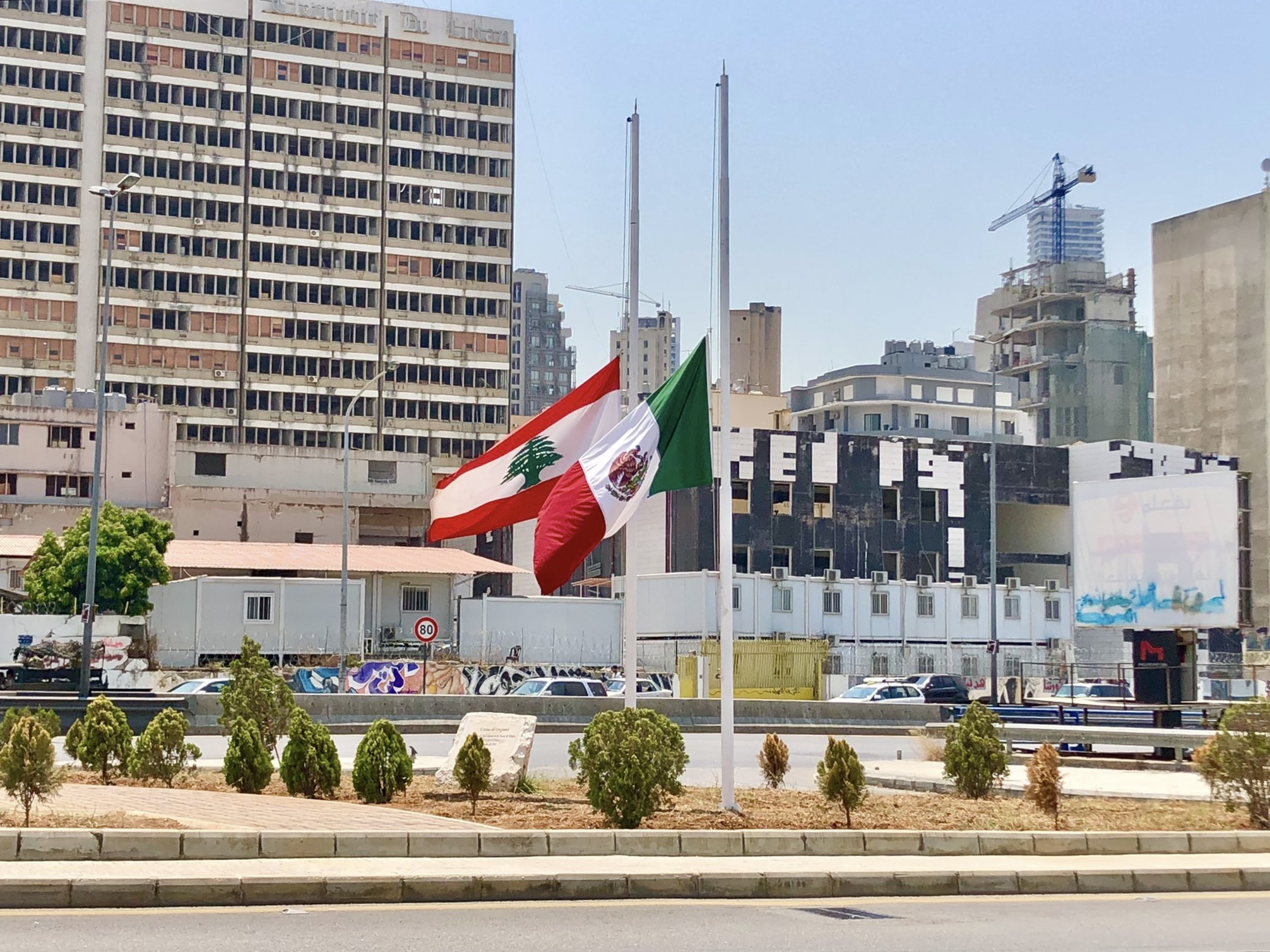
Monument in Beirut to Lebanese Migrants in Mexico.

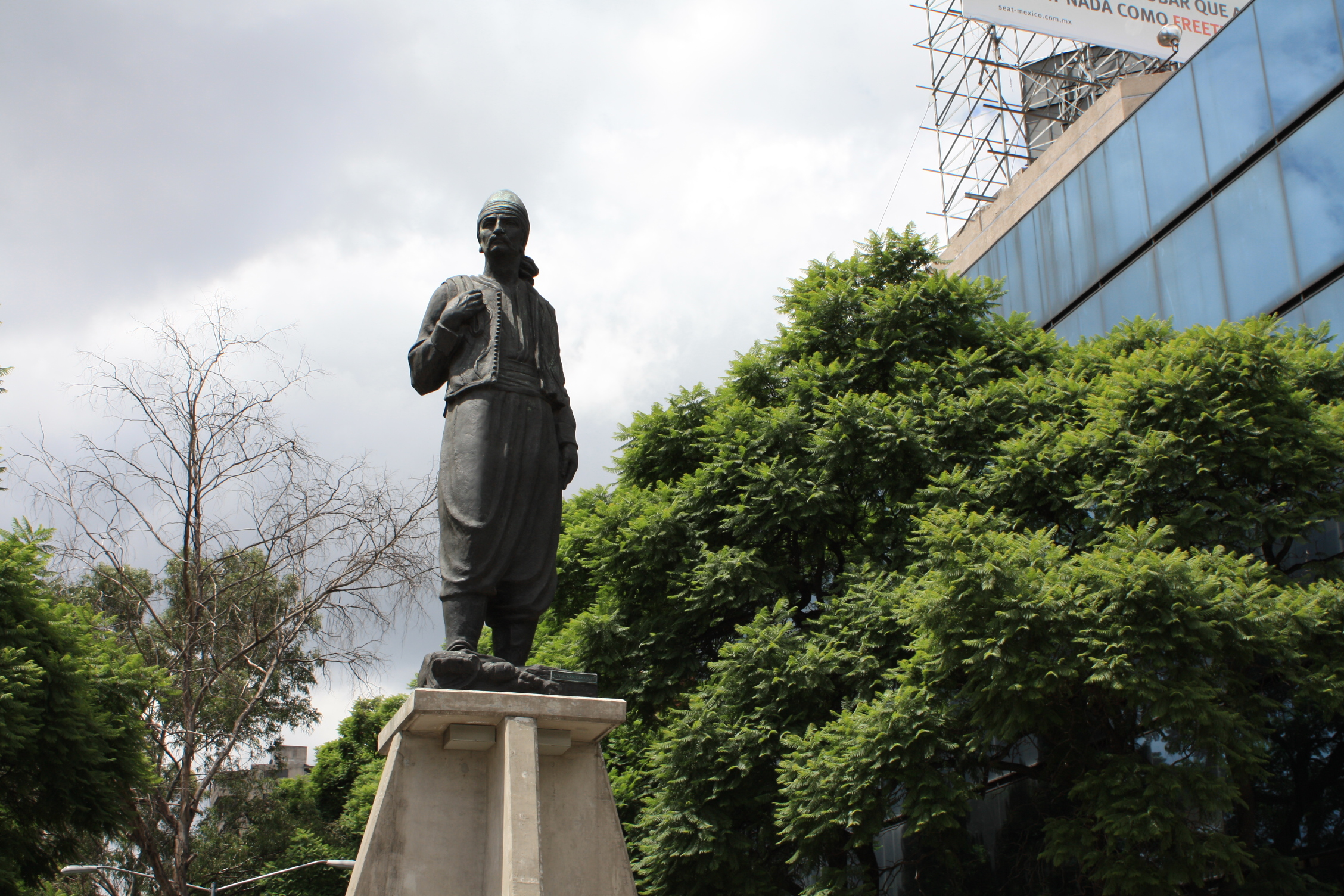
Monument to Lebanese Migrants in Mexico City.

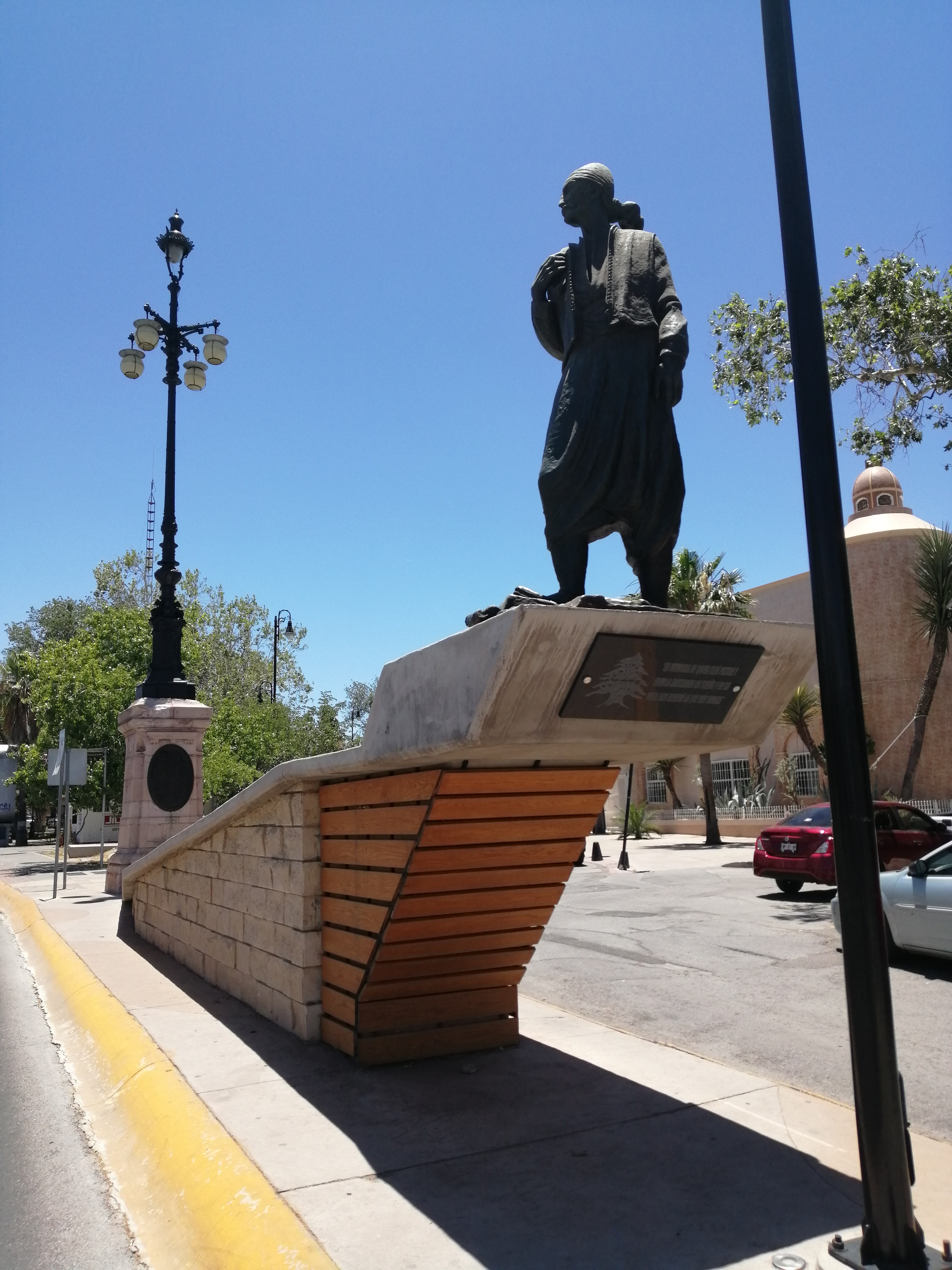
Monument to the Wandering Lebanese in Chihuahua City.

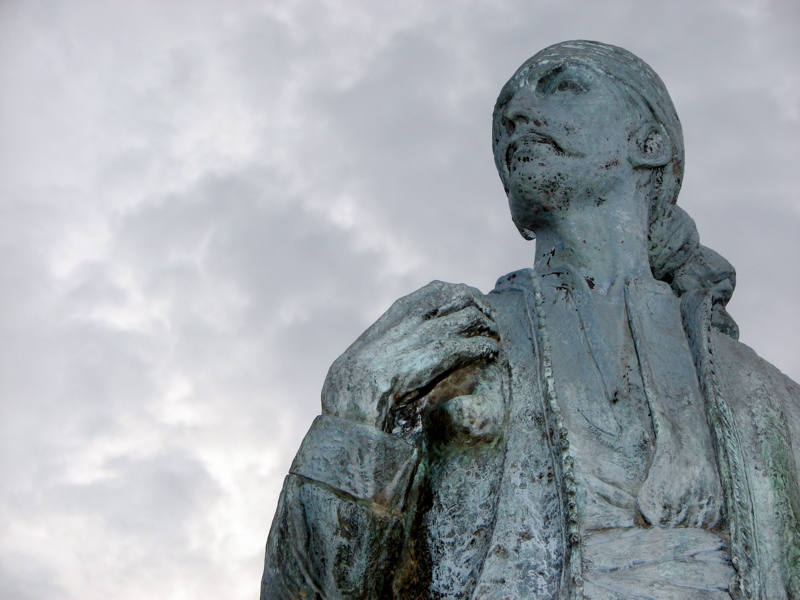
Monument to Lebanese Migrants in Monterrey.

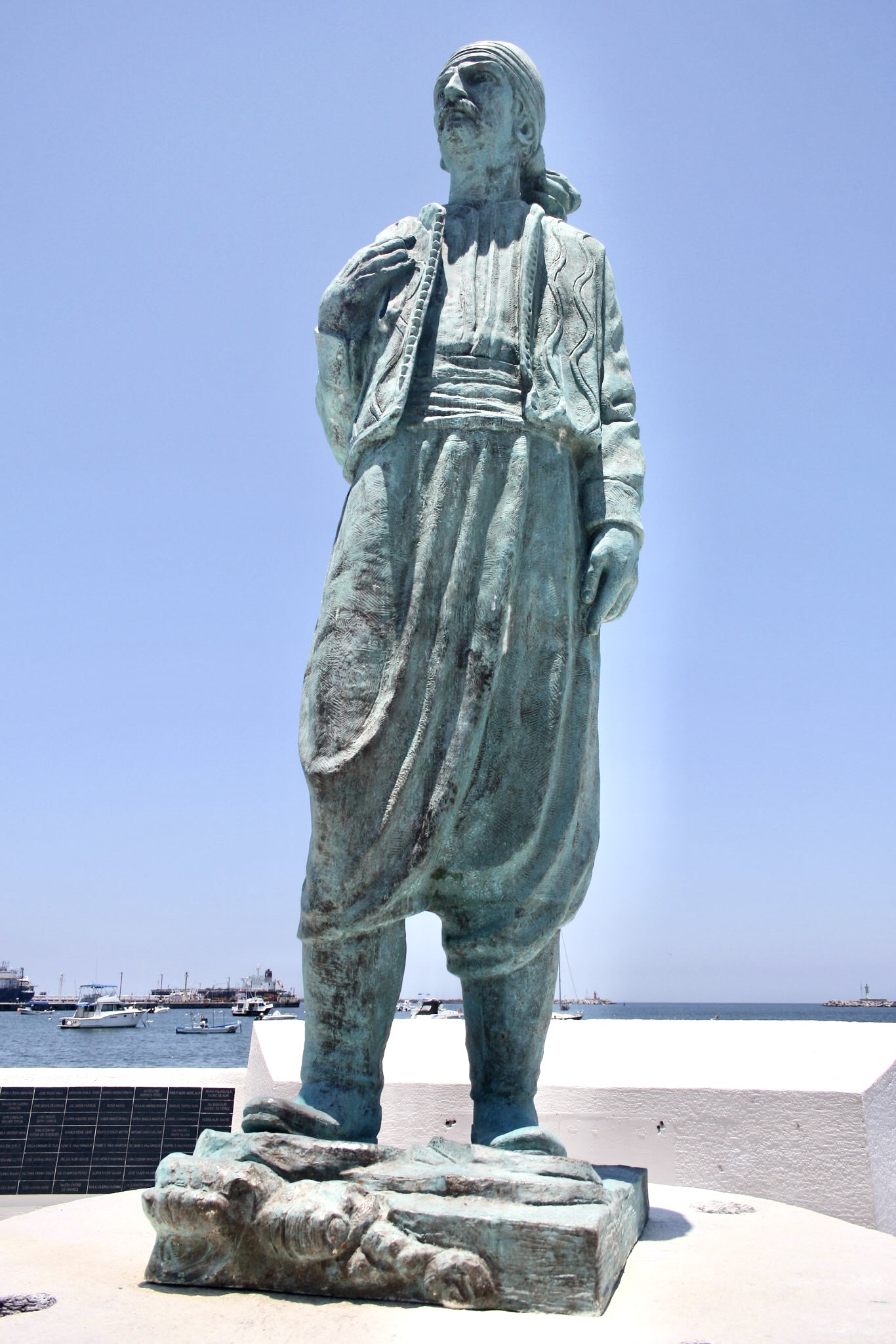
Monument to Lebanese Migrants in Veracruz City.

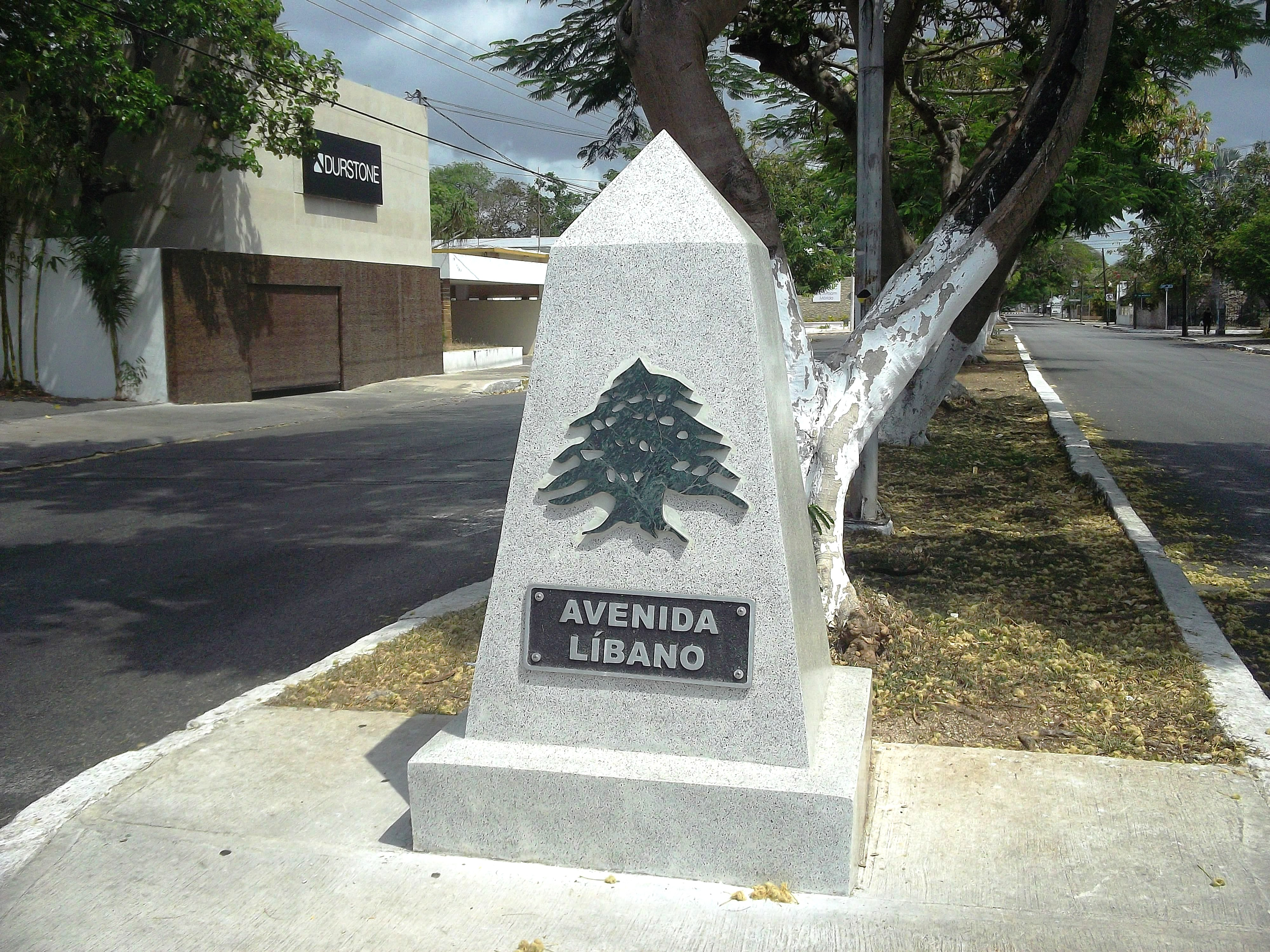
Avenida Líbano street marker in Mérida, Yucatán.

== Trade relations ==
In 2023, total trade between both nations amounted to US$23 million. Lebanon's main exports to Mexico include: telephones and mobile phones, medical instruments, chemical based products, plastic, wine and other alcohol, olive oil, and ginger. Mexico's main exports to Lebanon include: motor cars and other vehicles, parts and accessories for motor vehicles, rubber tires, telephones and mobile phones, glass, alcohol, fruits and nuts, vegetables and pepper.

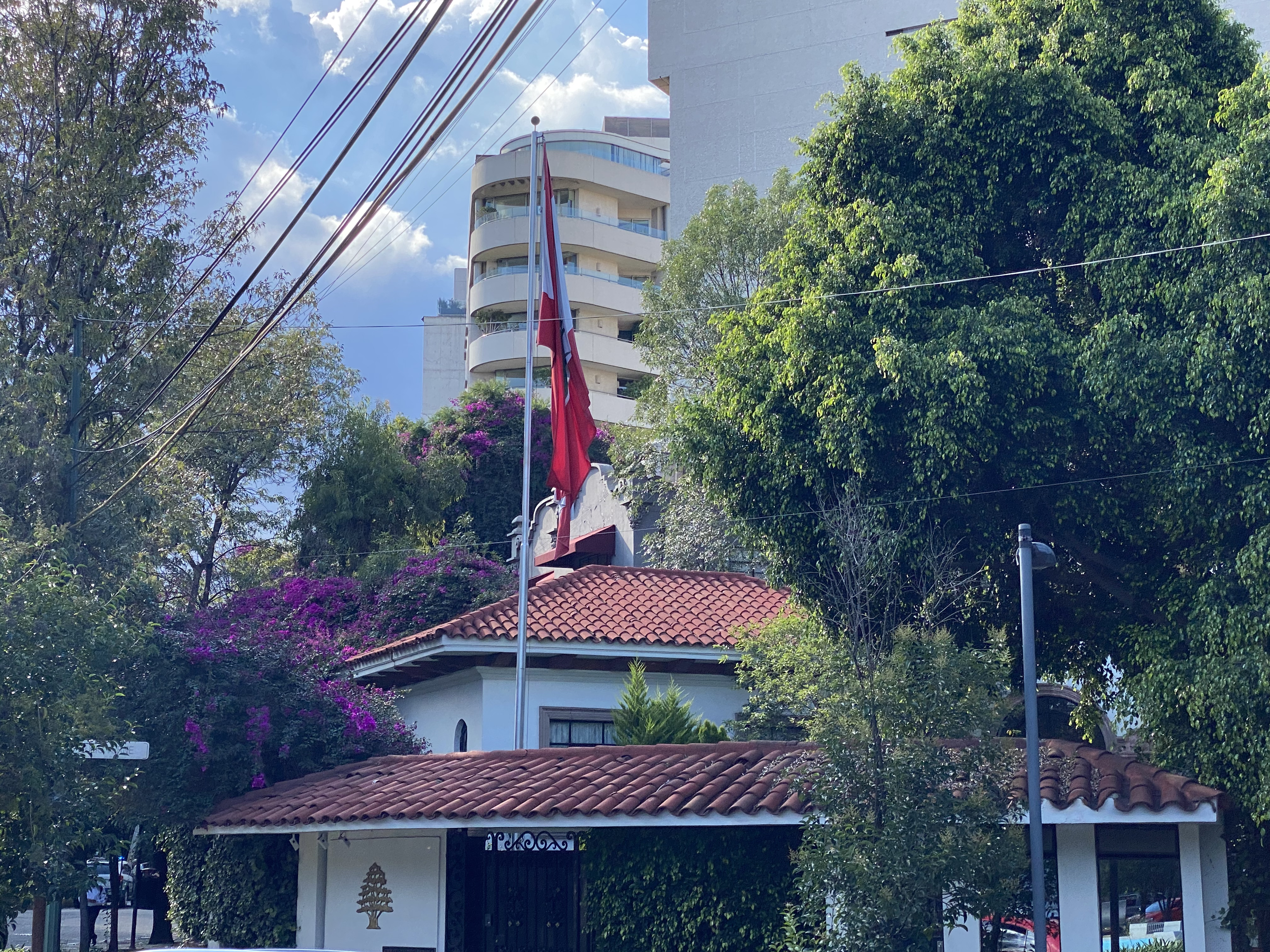
Embassy of Lebanon in Mexico City

== Resident diplomatic missions ==
- Lebanon has an embassy in Mexico City.
- Mexico has an embassy in Beirut.

== See also ==
- Lebanese Mexicans
