= Bichir family =

The Bichir family is a Mexican family of actors of Lebanese origin.

They include:

- Alejandro Bichir, husband of Maricruz
- Maricruz Nájera, wife of Alejandro
  - Bruno Bichir, son of Maricruz and Alejandro
  - Demián Bichir, son of Maricruz and Alejandro
  - Odiseo Bichir, son of Maricruz and Alejandro
