= Alejandro Bichir =

Mexican actor

- Born: Alejandro Bichir Batres; Mexico City, Mexico
- Occupations: Actor, director
- Years active: 1970–present
- Spouse: Maricruz Nájera (m. 1959)
- Children: Odiseo Bichir; Demián Bichir; Bruno Bichir
- Family: Bichir family

Alejandro Bichir Batres is a Mexican actor. He is the husband of Maricruz Nájera, and the father of Odiseo, Demián and Bruno Bichir.
