= Odiseo Bichir =

Mexican actor

- Born: Odiseo Bichir Nájera; May 3, 1960 (age 65); Mexico City, Mexico
- Occupation: Actor
- Spouse: Yolanda Ventura (m. 2017)
- Parent(s): Alejandro Bichir; Maricruz Nájera
- Relatives: Demián Bichir (brother); Bruno Bichir (brother)
- Family: Bichir family

Odiseo Bichir Nájera (born May 3, 1960) is a Mexican actor.

== Filmography ==
=== Film ===
Year	Title	Role	Notes
1983	Frida Still Life	Young sandinista	
1999	El coronel no tiene quien le escriba	Dr. Pardo	
1999	Un dulce olor a muerte	Pascual	
2000	Crónica de un desayuno	Roberto	
2001	Antigua vida mía	Emilio Palma	
2010	Hidalgo: La historia jamás contada	Maestro de Retorica	
2012	Hecho en China	Marcos Márquez	
2012	Colosio: El asesinato	Licenciado José Francisco Ruiz Massieu	
2012	El Santos vs la Tetona Mendoza	Cerdo Gutiérrez 01	Voice role
2012	Amor del bueno	Andrés	Short film

=== Television ===
Year	Title	Role	Notes
1977	Pacto de amor	Guillermo	
1977	La venganza	Caleta	3 episodes
1979	J.J. Juez	Raúl Gondra	
1986	Monte calvario	Roberto	
1986	El padre Gallo	Juan Francisco	
1987	Rosa salvaje	Piloto	1 episode
1988	El rincón de los prodigios	Padre Matías	
1989	Carrusel	Féderico	3 episodes
1990	La fuerza del amor	Carlos	
1991	La pícara soñadora	Ignacio Martínez	2 episodes
1993	Entre la vida y la muerte	Chon-Li	
1994	Más allá del puente	Tilico	
1994–1997	Mujer, casos de la vida real	Various	Episodes: "Un jacinto para mamá" and "Una mirada dulce y desesperada"
1995	María la del Barrio	Renato	
1995	Caminos cruzados	Orlando	
1996	La sombra del otro	Germán	3 episodes
1996	La antorcha encendida	Fray Servando Teresa de Mier	
1997	Mi pequeña traviesa	Salvador	
1998	Preciosa	Heriberto Robles	
1999	El diario de Daniela	Joel Castillo	
2000	Amigos x siempre	Francisco Capistrán	
2001	Aventuras en el tiempo	Avaro Zopilote-Prof / Lostime	
2004	Amarte es mi pecado	Sergio Samaniego	
2006–2007	Mundo de fieras	Tiberio Martinez Farias	
2008	Mujeres asesinas	Rodolfo Ramírez	Episode: "Jéssica, tóxica"
2009	Hermanos y detectives	Profesor Fuentes	Episode: "El profesor Fuentes"
2009	Gritos de muerte y libertad	General Félix Calleja	Episode: "El triunfo del temple"
2010–2011	Cuando me enamoro	Dr. Álvaro Nesme	
2012–2013	La mujer del Vendaval	Mateo Reyna	
2015	A que no me dejas	7 episodes	
2016-2017	La Doña	Lázaro Hernández	
