= Bruno Bichir =

Mexican actor (born 1967)

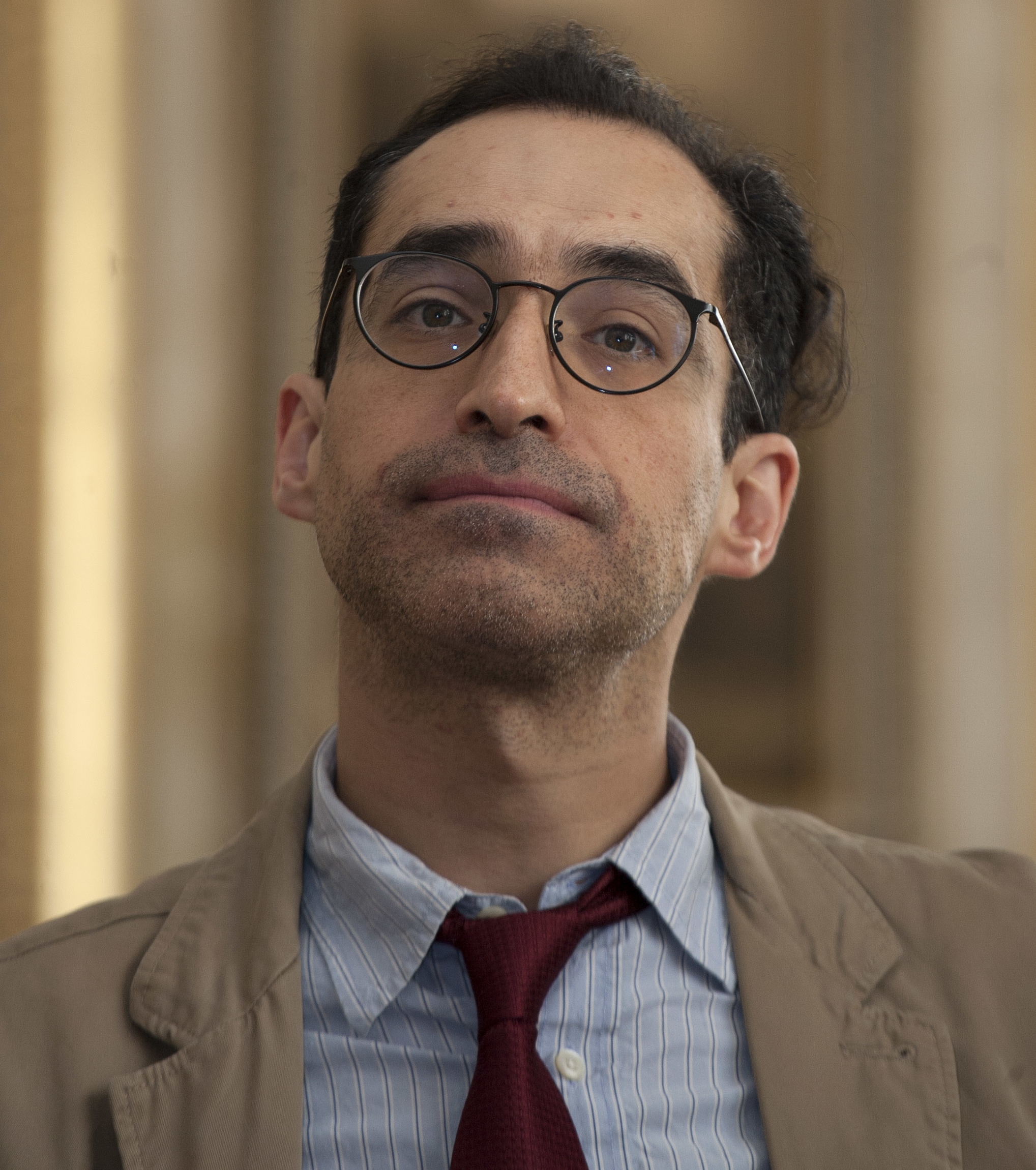
- Born: Bruno Bichir Nájera; 6 October 1967 (age 59); Mexico City, Mexico
- Occupation: Actor
- Parents: Alejandro Bichir (father); Maricruz Nájera (mother)
- Relatives: Odiseo Bichir (brother); Demián Bichir (brother)
- Family: Bichir family

Bruno Bichir Nájera (born 6 October 1967) is a Mexican actor.

== Biography ==
Bichir was born in Mexico City. He started his acting career at the age of 5 in several theatres, films and television series. He made his film debut in a minor role for Under Fire. In 1986, he obtained a role in Frida, naturaleza viva, a film about the life of Frida Kahlo. On television, he acted on three telenovelas with Televisa and then starred in Háblame de amor ("Talk to me about love"). In 1999, he produced and starred in Benjamin Cann's A Breakfast Chronicle, in which he was nominated for the Ariel Award for Best Actor. In 2001, he and his brother Demián Bichir starred in the Spanish co-production of Don't Tempt Me, and they were nominated for the Best Bichir in a Film at the MTV Movie Awards-Mexico. Bichir made a 2018 guest appearance on the DC Universe series Titans as the first actor to portray Doom Patrol leader the Chief in live-action, but the role was recast with Timothy Dalton in the Doom Patrol's eponymous series.

== Awards ==
=== Ariel Award ===
7 Ariel Awards, including:

- Best Actor
  - 2001 nomination for Crónica de un desayuno
  - 1996 nomination for El anzuelo
  - 1995 nomination for El jardín del Edén
  - 1994 for Principio y fin
- Best Supporting Actor
  - 1999 nomination for El evangelio de las maravillas
  - 1997 nomination for Amorosos fantasmas
  - 1993 nomination for Golpe de suerte
  - 1992 nomination for El patrullero

=== MTV Movie Awards-Mexico ===
- Best Bichir in a Movie
- 2002 nomination for Ciudades oscuras
- 2001 nomination for Sin noticias de Dios (Bendito infierno)

=== Valladolid International Film Festival ===
- Best actor
  - 1995, for El callejón de los milagros

== Filmography ==
=== Cinema of the United States ===
- The Quarry (2020) as David Martin
- Sicario: Day of the Soldado (2018) as Angel (aka Deaf Guy)
- Julia (2008) as Diego
- Casa de los Babys (2003) as Diómedes
- Death and the Compass (1992) as "drug addict II"
- Lucky Break (1992) as Vicente
- Under Fire (1983) as a boy at Jazy's house

=== Cinema of Mexico ===
- Un rescate de huevitos (2021)
- Las leyendas: el origen (2021)
- Un gallo con muchos huevos (2015)
- El Santos vs. La Tetona Mendoza (2012)
- La Revolución de Juan Escopeta (2011)
- Otra película de huevos y un Pollo (2009)
- Una película de huevos (2006)
- El que come y canta (loco se levanta) (2006)
- La mujer de mi hermano (2005) as Boris
- El día menos pensado (2005)
- Conejo en la luna (2004) as Antonio (English title: Rabbit on the moon)
- Brother Bear (2003) as Kenai (Latin Spanish dub)
- Si un instante (2003) as Martín
- Ciudades oscuras (2002) as Satanás
- Sin noticias de Dios (Bendito infierno) (2001) as Eduardo
- Hasta los huesos (2001) (voice)
- La toma de la embajada (2000) as Ricardo Galán, Ambassador of Mexico
- La cosa que no podría morir (2000) as Hank Huston
- La máscara de Zorro (2000) as Alejandro Murrieta/Zorro
- Extraños (1999) as Kurt
- Crónica de un desayuno (1999) as Marcos
- El evangelio de las maravillas (1998) as Gavilán
- Ciudad que se escapa (1998) as Chato
- Cruz (1998/II)
- Katuwira, donde nacen y mueren los sueños (1996) as Nicolás
- El anzuelo (1996) as Carlos
- Pez muerto no nada (1996)
- Algunas nubes (1995) as Carlos Vargas
- Midaq Alley (1995) as Abel
- Santo Enredo (1995) (TV) as Wang Chong
- Espiritus (1995)
- Nadie hablará de nosotras cuando hayamos muerto (1995) as Mani
- El plato fuerte (1995)
- El jardín del Edén (1994) as Felipe
- Días de combate (1994) as Carlos Vargas
- Tu vida y mi vida (1994)
- Amorosos fantasmas (1994)
- Un año perdido (1993)
- Principio y fin (1993) as Nicolás Botero
- ¡Aquí espantan! (1993) as Pablo
- Serpientes y escaleras (1992) as Raúl
- Anatomia de una violación (1992)
- Cazador de cabezas (1992)
- Golpe de suerte (1992)
- El patrullero (1991) as Anibal
- Luna de miel al cuarto menguante (1990)
- Llueve otra vez (1989)
- Rojo amanecer (1989) as Sergio
- Frida, naturaleza viva (1986) as a young Sandinista

=== Cinema of Argentina ===
- El mural (2010)

== Stage ==
- Cabaret (2005–06)
- Estás ahí (2005)
- Extras

== Telenovelas ==
=== TV Azteca ===
- Amor en custodia (2005–2006) as Conrado
- La Heredera (2004) as Santiago
- La calle de las novias (2000) as Sergio
- Háblame de amor (1999) as Esteban

=== Televisa ===
- La Culpa (1996) as Adolfo
- Sueño de amor (1993)
- Mujeres de negro (2016) as Zacarías Zaldívar

== Television ==
=== Canal 11 ===
- Yo sólo sé que no he cenado (2012-2017)

=== Freeform ===
- Party of Five (2020)

=== Netflix ===
- Narcos (2015-2017)
- Ozark (2017)
