= Demián Bichir =

Mexican actor (born 1963)

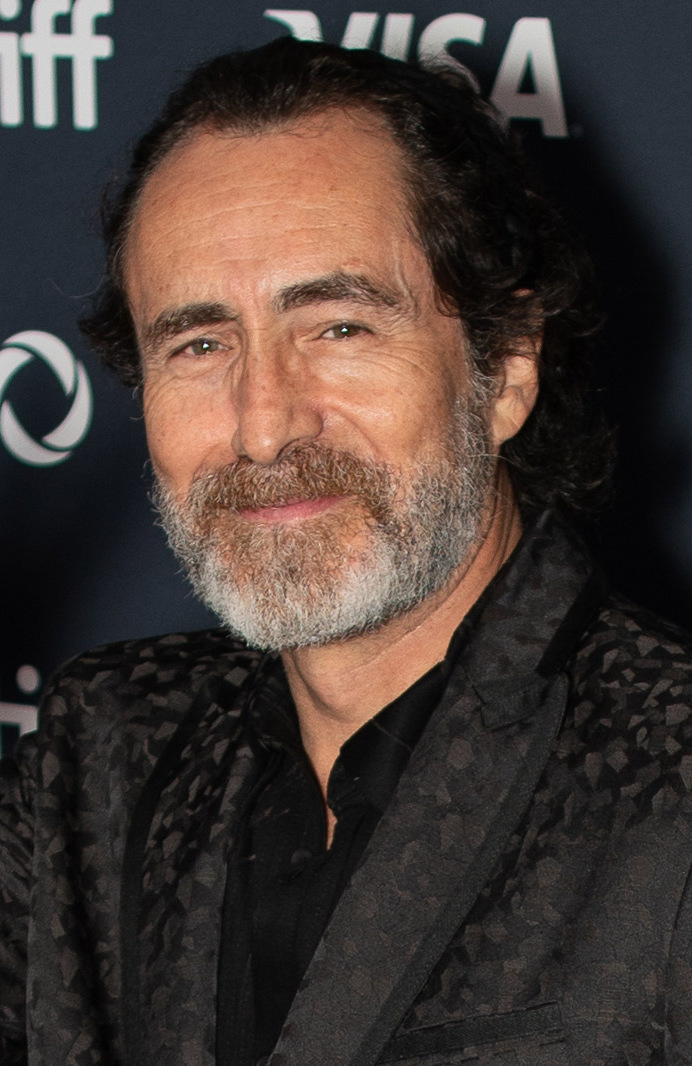
- Bichir at the 2024 Toronto International Film Festival
- Born: Demián Bichir Nájera; 1 August 1963 (age 63); Torreón, Coahuila, Mexico
- Citizenship: Mexico; United States
- Occupation: Actor
- Years active: 1977–present
- Spouses: Lisset (m. 2001; div. 2003); Stefanie Sherk (m. 2011; died 2019)
- Children: 1
- Parents: Alejandro Bichir (father); Maricruz Nájera (mother)
- Relatives: Odiseo Bichir (brother); Bruno Bichir (brother)
- Family: Bichir family

Demián Bichir Nájera (Spanish pronunciation: [deˈmjam biˈtʃiɾ ˈnaxeɾa]; (Note: In isolation, Demián is pronounced [deˈmjan].) born 1 August 1963) is a Mexican actor. After starring in telenovelas, he began to appear in Hollywood films. He was nominated for the Academy Award for Best Actor for his role in A Better Life.

== Early life ==
Bichir was born on 1 August 1963 in Torreón. His parents are actors Alejandro Bichir and Maricruz Nájera. His brothers, Odiseo and Bruno, are also actors. His paternal family is of Lebanese origin. He worked at the National Theater Company, Shakespeare and Dostoyevsky, and the Mexican Association of Theater Critics. He attended the Lee Strasberg Theatre and Film Institute.

== Career ==
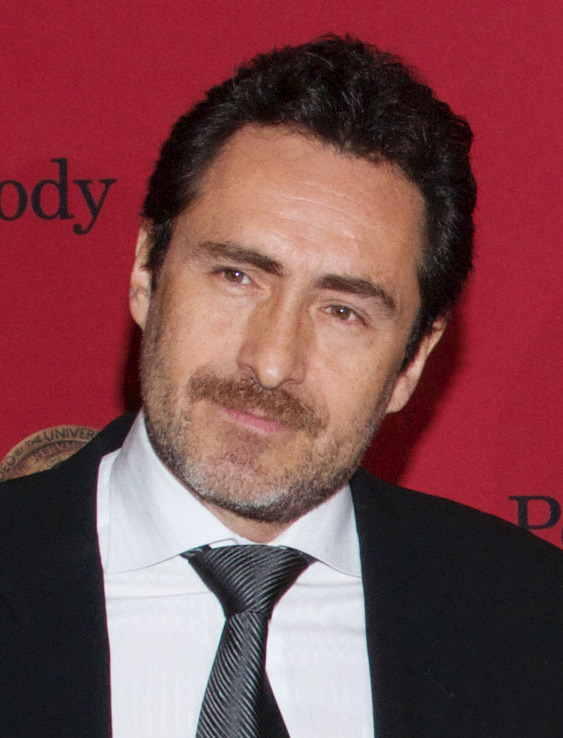
Bichir in 2014

Bichir is known for his work as a Mexican actor. After starring in telenovelas, he began to appear in Hollywood films. He played Fidel Castro in Che. He starred in the television series The Bridge and Grand Hotel. His directorial debut film A Circus Story & A Love Song premiered at the Morelia International Film Festival. Other films including A Better Life, Alien: Covenant, Chaos Walking, The Hateful Eight, The Nun, and Without Blood.

He was nominated for the Academy Award for Best Actor for his role in A Better Life.

== Personal life ==
He is an American Civil Liberties Union Ambassador of Immigration Rights. His second wife, Stefanie Sherk, died in a swimming pool on 12 April 2019. Bichir has a daughter, Gala.

== Filmography ==
=== Film ===
| Year | Title | Role | Notes |
|---|---|---|---|
| 1987 | Hotel Colonial | Young Hotel Clerk | |
| 1988 | The Penitent | Roberto | |
| 1989 | Rojo Amanecer | Jorge | |
| 1993 | Miroslava | Ricardo | |
| 1995 | Nobody Will Speak of Us When We're Dead | Omar | |
| 1996 | Solo | Rio | |
| 1997 | Perdita Durango | Catalina | |
| 1999 | Sexo, pudor y lágrimas | Tomás | |
| 2000 | Gimme the Power | Gabriel | |
| 2001 | Don't Tempt Me | Manny Chavez | |
| 2004 | Hypnos | Miguel | |
| 2007 | Fuera del cielo | Everardo Sánchez | |
| 2007 | American Visa | Mario Alvarez | |
| 2008 | Che | Fidel Castro | |
| 2010 | Hidalgo: la historia jamás contada | Miguel Hidalgo y Costilla | |
| 2011 | A Better Life | Carlos Galindo | |
| 2011 | Foreverland | Salvador | |
| 2012 | Savages | Alex Reyes | |
| 2012 | El Santos vs. la Tetona Mendoza | Pork Gutiérrez #3 | Voice |
| 2013 | The Heat | Hale | |
| 2013 | Machete Kills | Marcos 'The Madman' Mendez | |
| 2013 | Dom Hemingway | Ivan Fontaine | |
| 2014 | Death in Buenos Aires | Inspector Chávez | |
| 2015 | The Hateful Eight | Marco 'The Mexican' / Señor Bob | |
| 2016 | Good Kids | Yaco | |
| 2016 | Lowriders | Miguel Alvarez | |
| 2016 | 7:19 | Fernando Pellicer | |
| 2017 | Alien: Covenant | Sergeant Lope | |
| 2018 | The Nun | Father Burke | |
| 2019 | The Grudge | Detective Goodman | |
| 2020 | The Midnight Sky | Sanchez | |
| 2021 | Land | Miguel | |
| 2021 | Chaos Walking | Ben Moore | |
| 2021 | Godzilla vs. Kong | Walter Simmons | |
| 2023 | Chupa | Chava | |
| 2024 | A Circus Story & A Love Song | Refugio | Also director and writer |
| 2024 | Without Blood | Tito | |
| 2025 | Black Phone 2 | Armando | |
| 2026 | Diamond | Alberto Echevarria | |

=== Television ===
| Year | Title | Role | Notes |
|---|---|---|---|
| 1977–1978 | Rina | Juanito | |
| 1982–1983 | Vivir enamorada | Nacho | |
| 1983 | Cuando los hijos se van | Ricardo | |
| 1983 | Choices of the Heart | Armando | Television film |
| 1984–1985 | Los años felices | Tomas | |
| 1987–1988 | El rincón de los prodigios | Monchito | |
| 1995–1996 | Lazos de Amor | Valente Segura | |
| 1996–1997 | Nada personal | Comandante Alfonso Carbajal | |
| 2001 | In the Time of the Butterflies | Manolo Tavárez | Television film |
| 2008–2010 | Weeds | Esteban Carlos Reyes | 27 episodes |
| 2013–2014 | The Bridge | Detective Marco Ruiz | 26 episodes |
| 2019 | Grand Hotel | Santiago Mendoza | 13 episodes |
| 2022 | Let the Right One In | Mark Kane | 10 episodes |

== Awards ==
| Award | Category | Title | Result |
|---|---|---|---|
| Ariel Award | Best Actor | Hidalgo: La historia jamás contada | Nominated |
| Academy Awards | Best Actor | A Better Life | Nominated |
| ALMA Award | Favorite Movie Actor | A Better Life | Nominated |
| Independent Spirit Awards | Best Male Lead | A Better Life | Nominated |
| Screen Actors Guild Awards | Outstanding Performance by a Male Actor in a Leading Role | A Better Life | Nominated |
| Black Reel Awards | Outstanding Actor | A Better Life | Nominated |
| Gold Derby Awards | Best Cast | The Hateful Eight | Nominated |
| Hollywood Film Awards | Best Cast | The Hateful Eight | Won |

== See also ==
- List of Mexican Academy Award winners and nominees
- List of actors with Academy Award nominations
- List of actors nominated for Academy Awards for non-English performances
