= List of songs recorded by Gloria Trevi =

List of recorded songs by Mexican artist Gloria Trevi

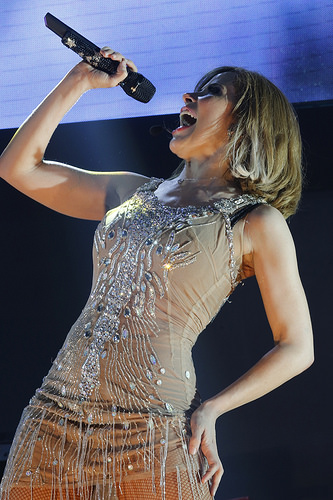
Gloria Trevi performing in 2015.

Gloria Trevi is a Mexican singer and songwriter who started her musical career as a member of the girl band Boquitas Pintadas in 1985. She then released her first solo album ...Qué Hago Aquí? in 1989, followed by four more studio albums, a compilation and a remix album which were all released throughout the 90s. She was arrested in 2000 accused of sexual abuse and corruption of minors, and spent over four years in prison waiting for a trial, until a judge found her not guilty of the charges and freed her in 2004. She has since resumed her career, releasing ten more studio albums, several stand-alone singles and compilations as well as five live albums. Overall, she's recorded over 220 songs including collaborations with other artists, and she has written or co-written around 150 of those.

== Songs ==
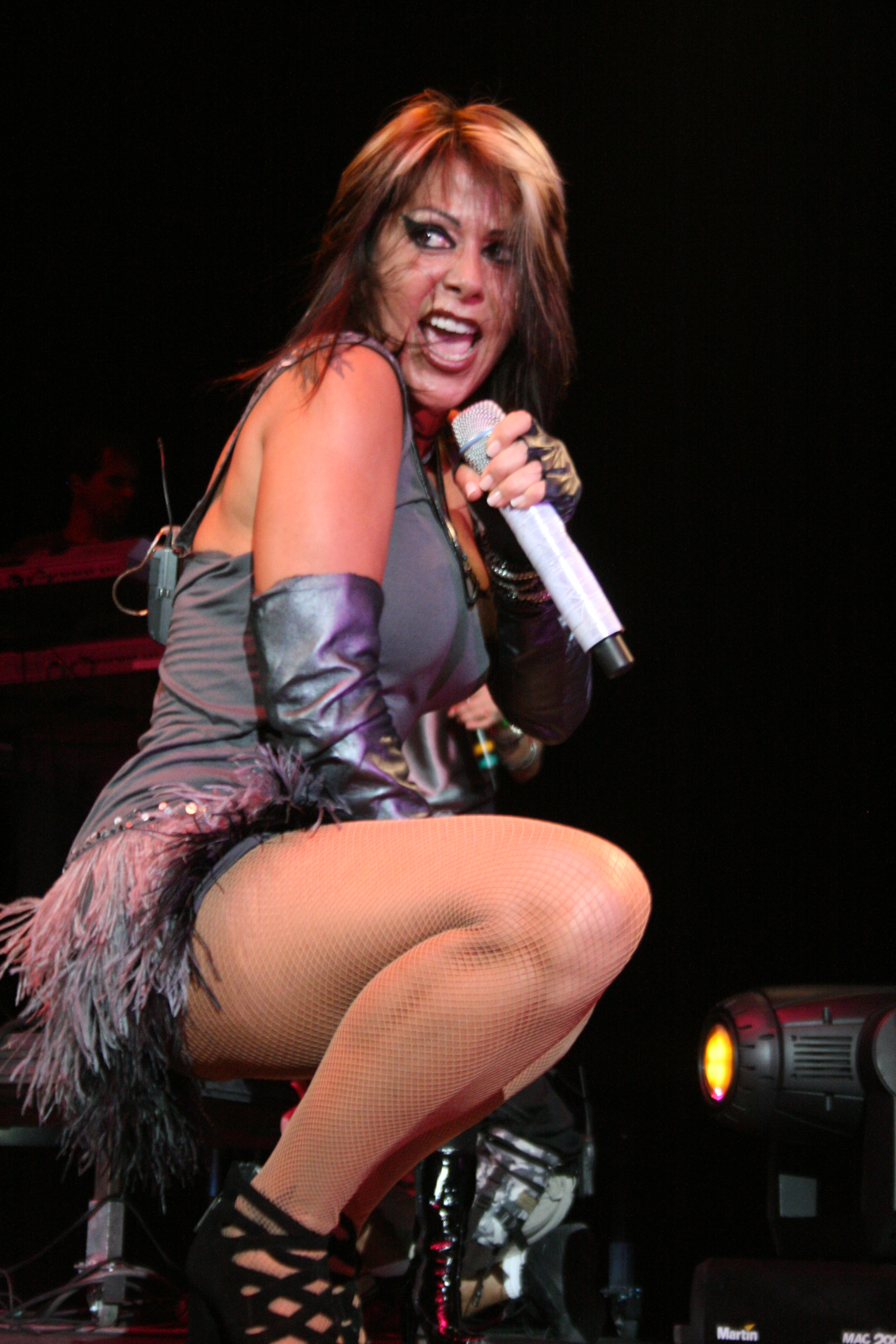
Trevi recorded a joint album with Alejandra Guzmán in 2017.

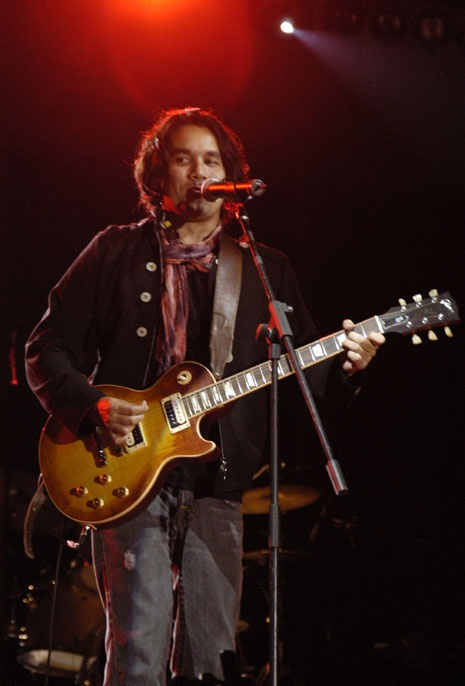
Trevi has collaborated with Jorge Villamizar from the band Bacilos in various songs.

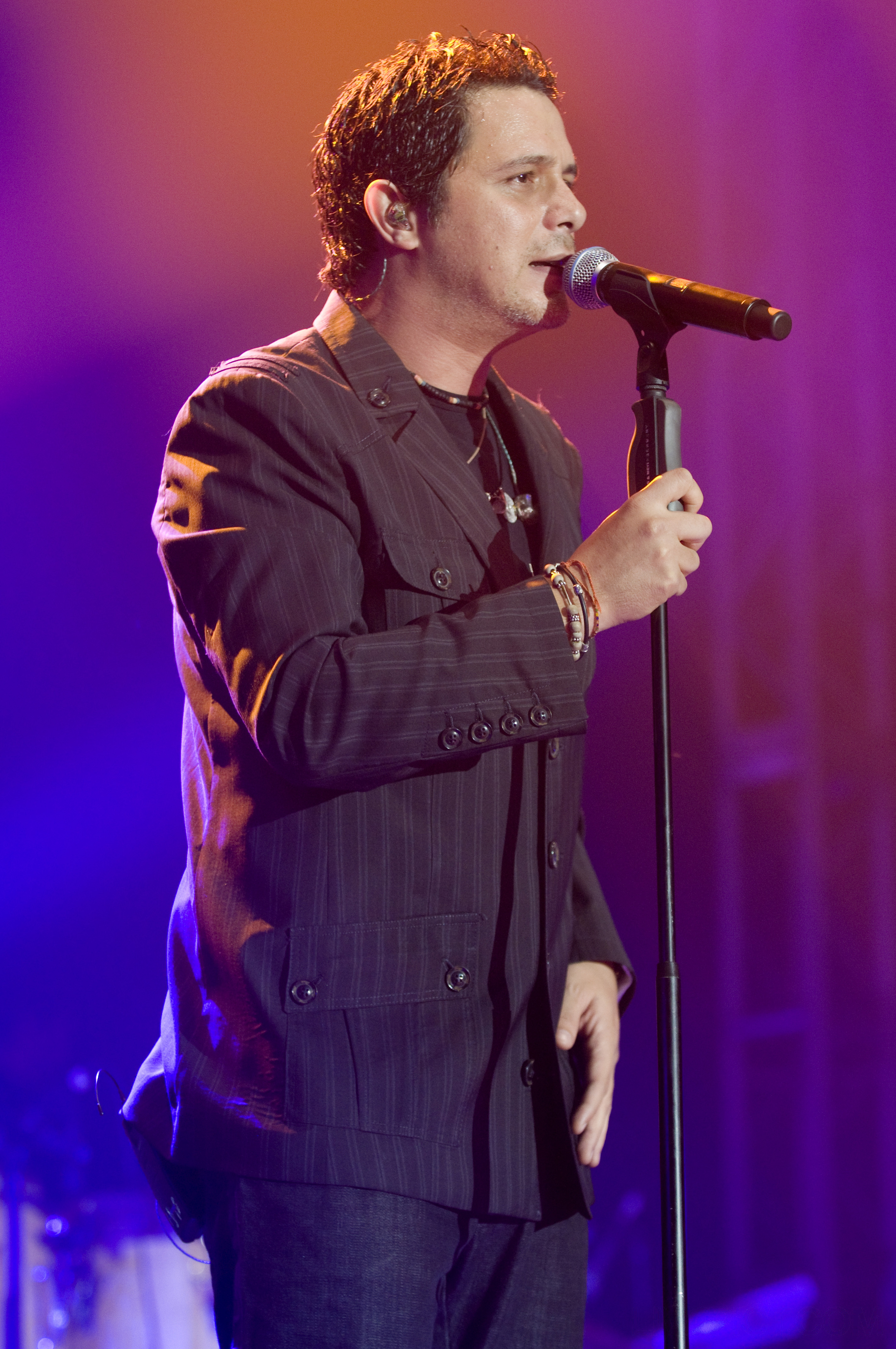
Trevi collaborated with Alejandro Sanz after participating on the Mexican edition of The Voice in 2016.

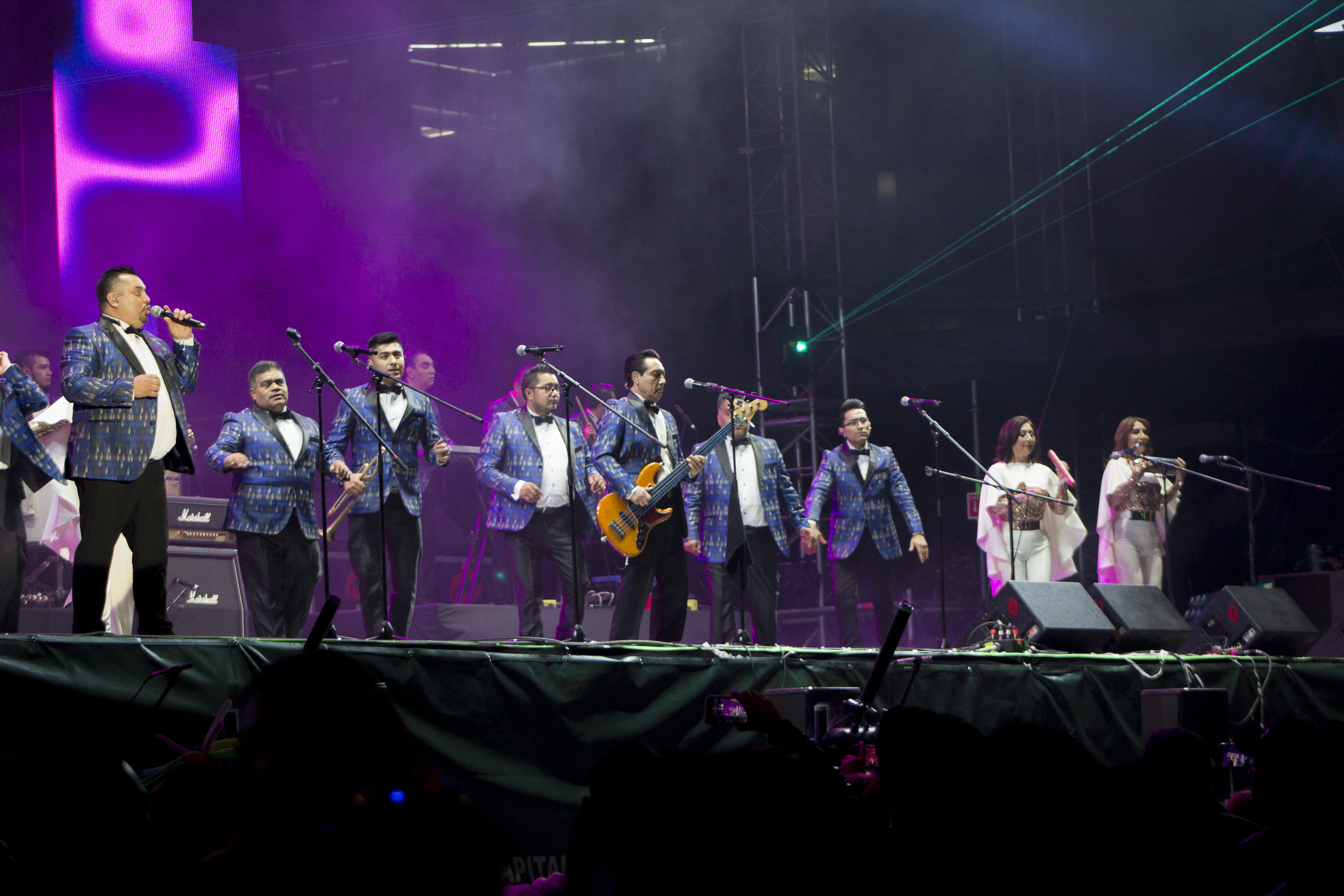
Los Ángeles Azules covered "Dr. Psiquiatra" in collaboration with Trevi herself in 2018.

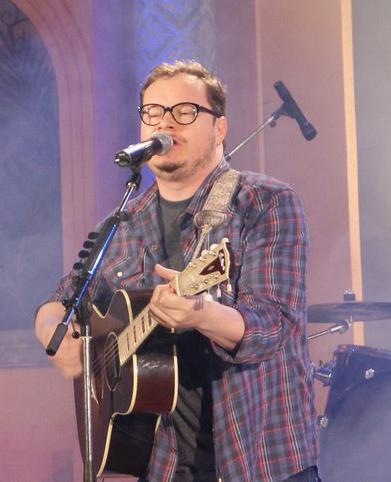
Leonel García has co-written several songs with Trevi.

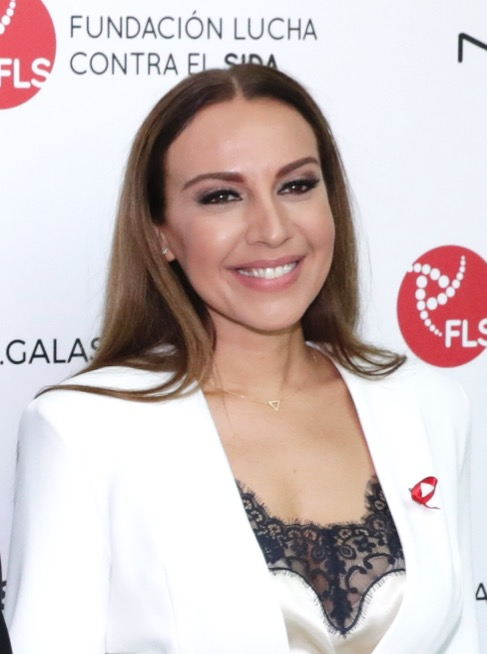
Mónica Naranjo collaborated with Trevi on the 2020 single "Grande".

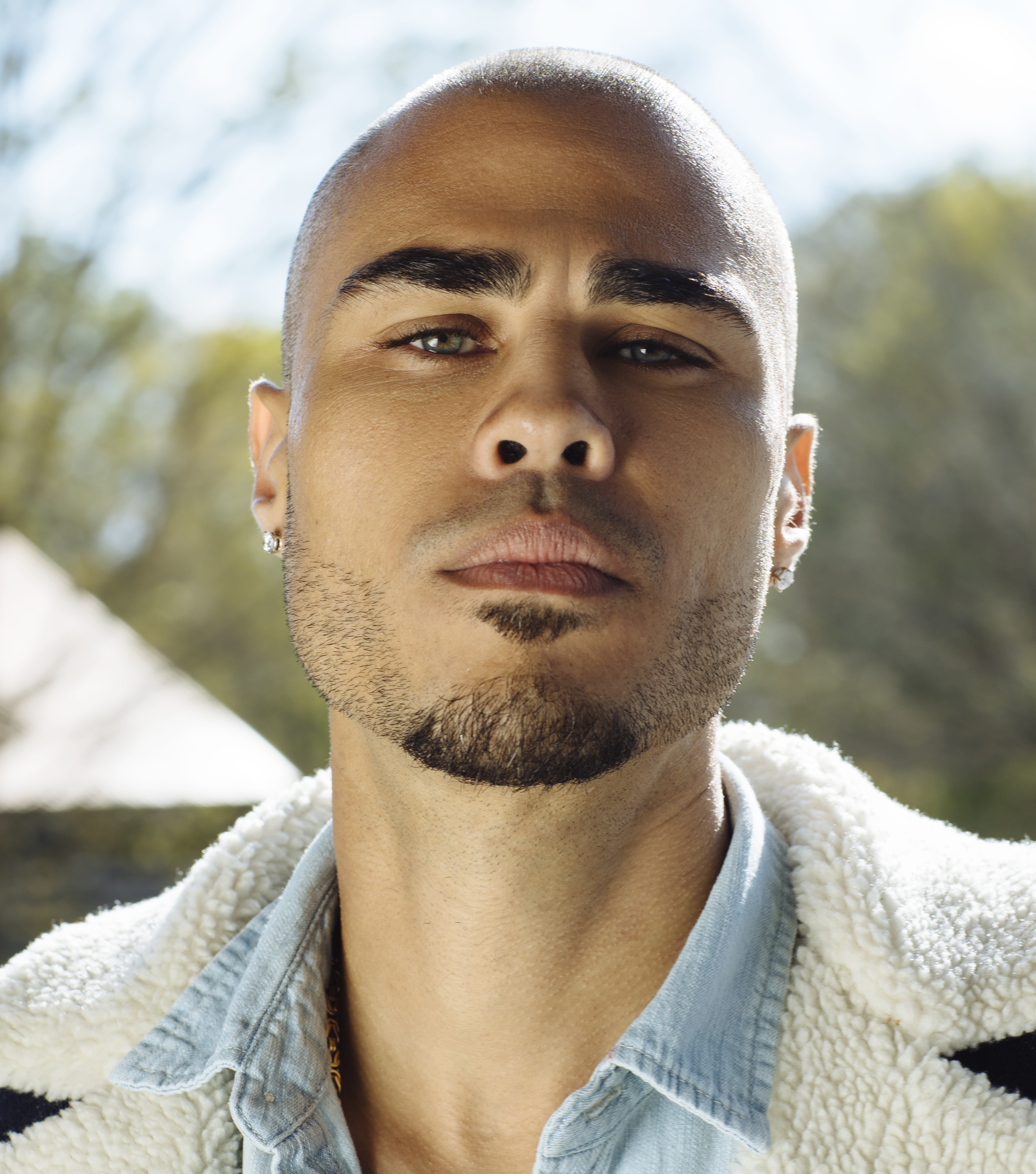
Shy Carter was a featured artist on the 2013 single "Habla Blah Blah".

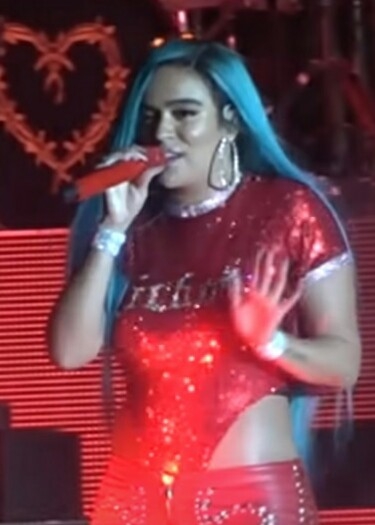
Trevi and Karol G collaborated on the track "Hijoepu*#" in 2019.

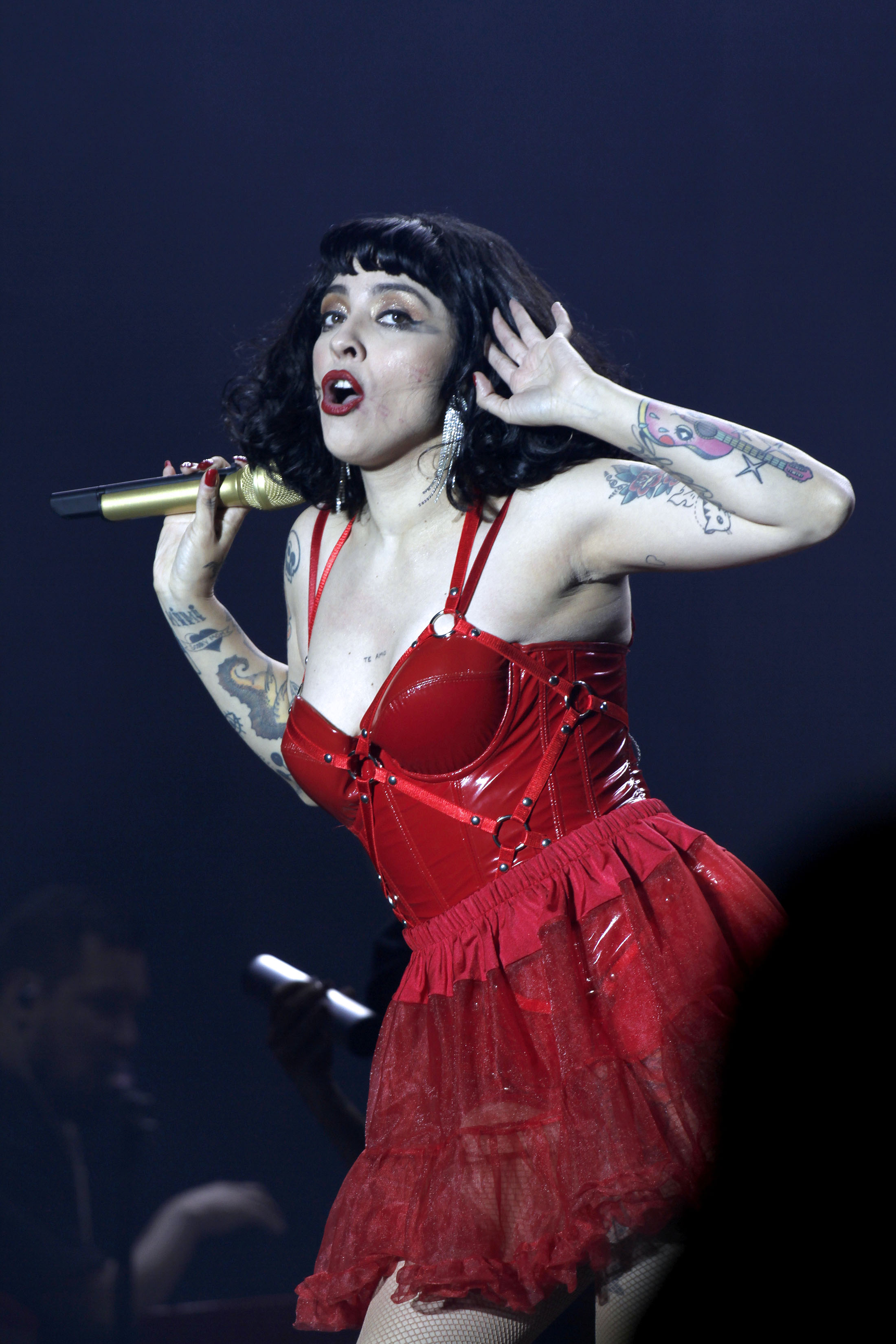
Trevi was featured on Mon Laferte's track "La Mujer" in 2021.

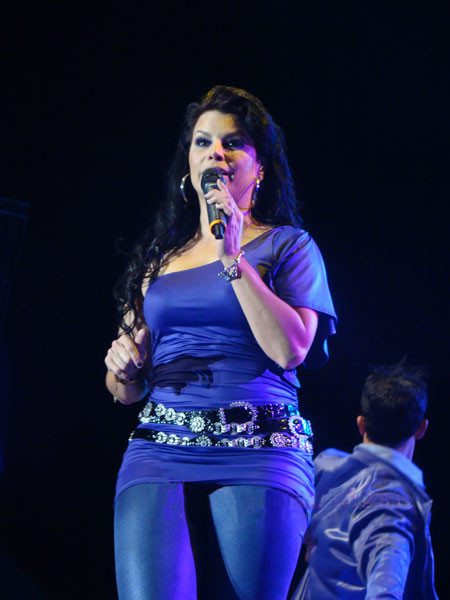
Olga Tañón was featured on the track "Lo Que Te Toca" from Trevi's 2007 album Una Rosa Blu.

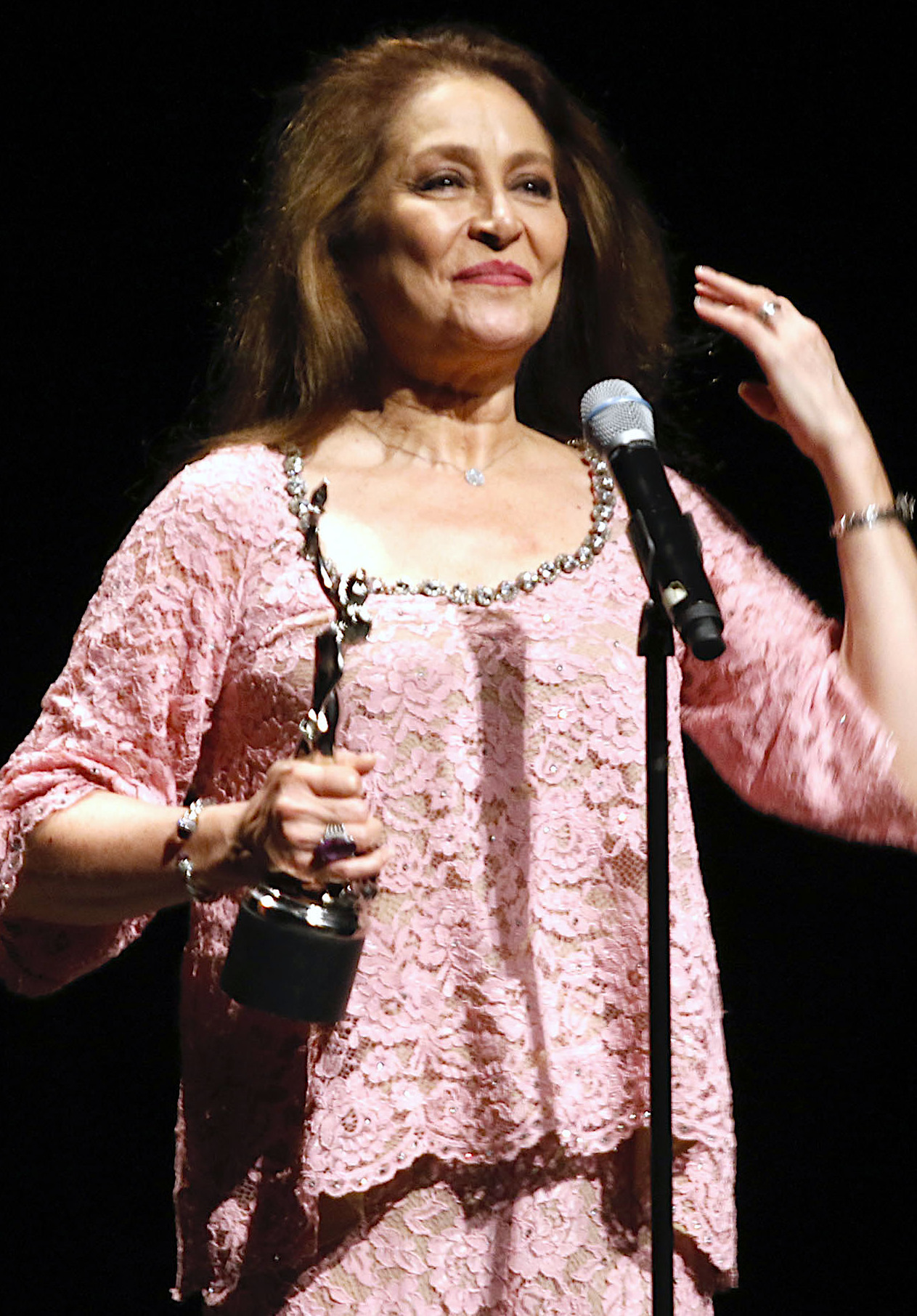
Daniela Romo invited Trevi to collaborate on a new version of her hit "Mentiras" in 2012.

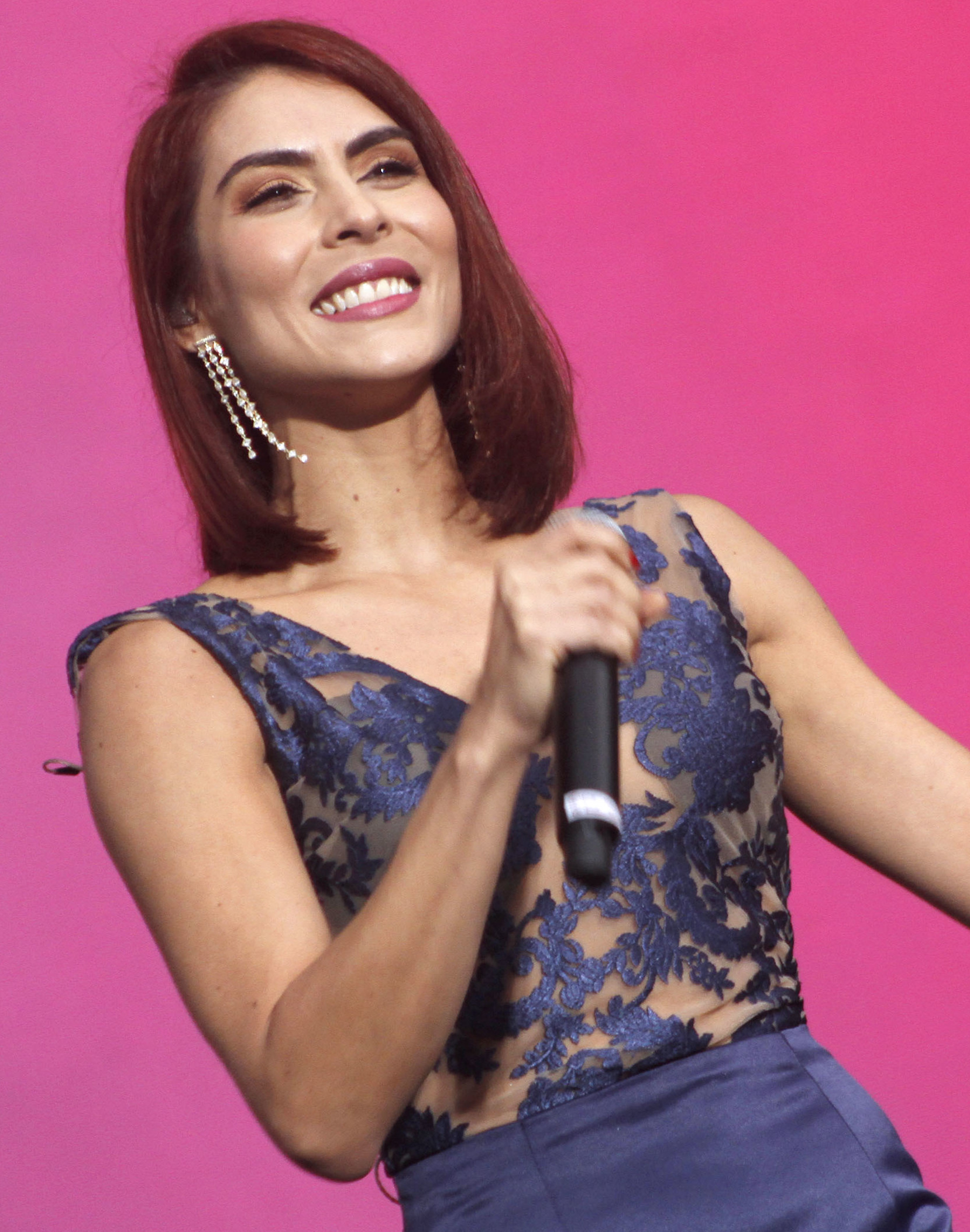
María León and Trevi released "Mudanza de Hormiga" as a stand-alone single in 2021.

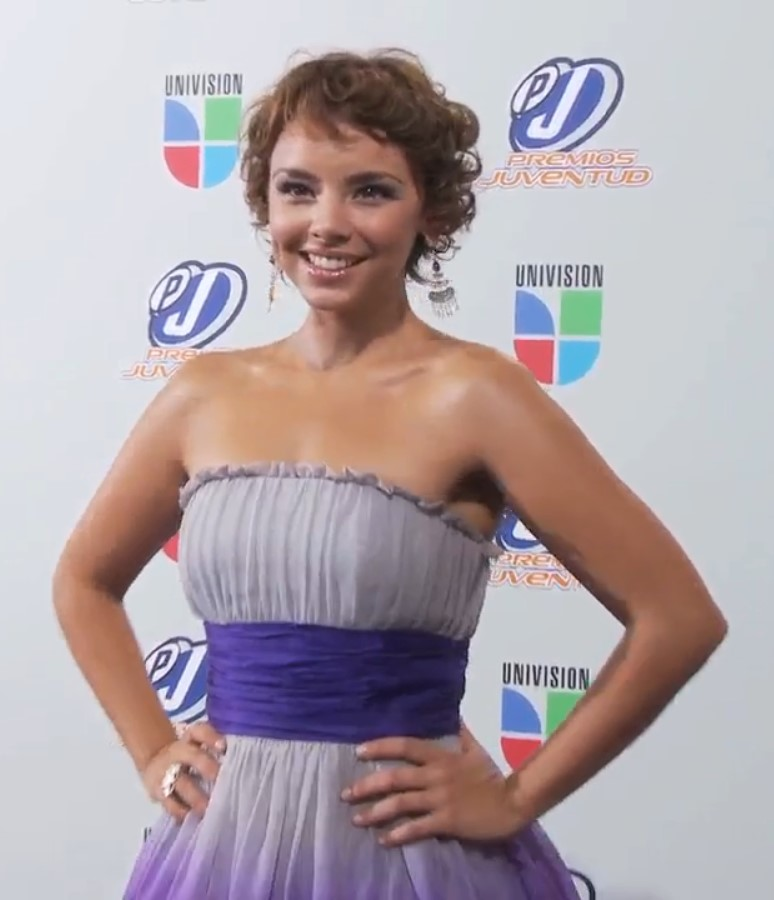
Trevi was featured on Chenoa's 2009 track "Nada de Nada".

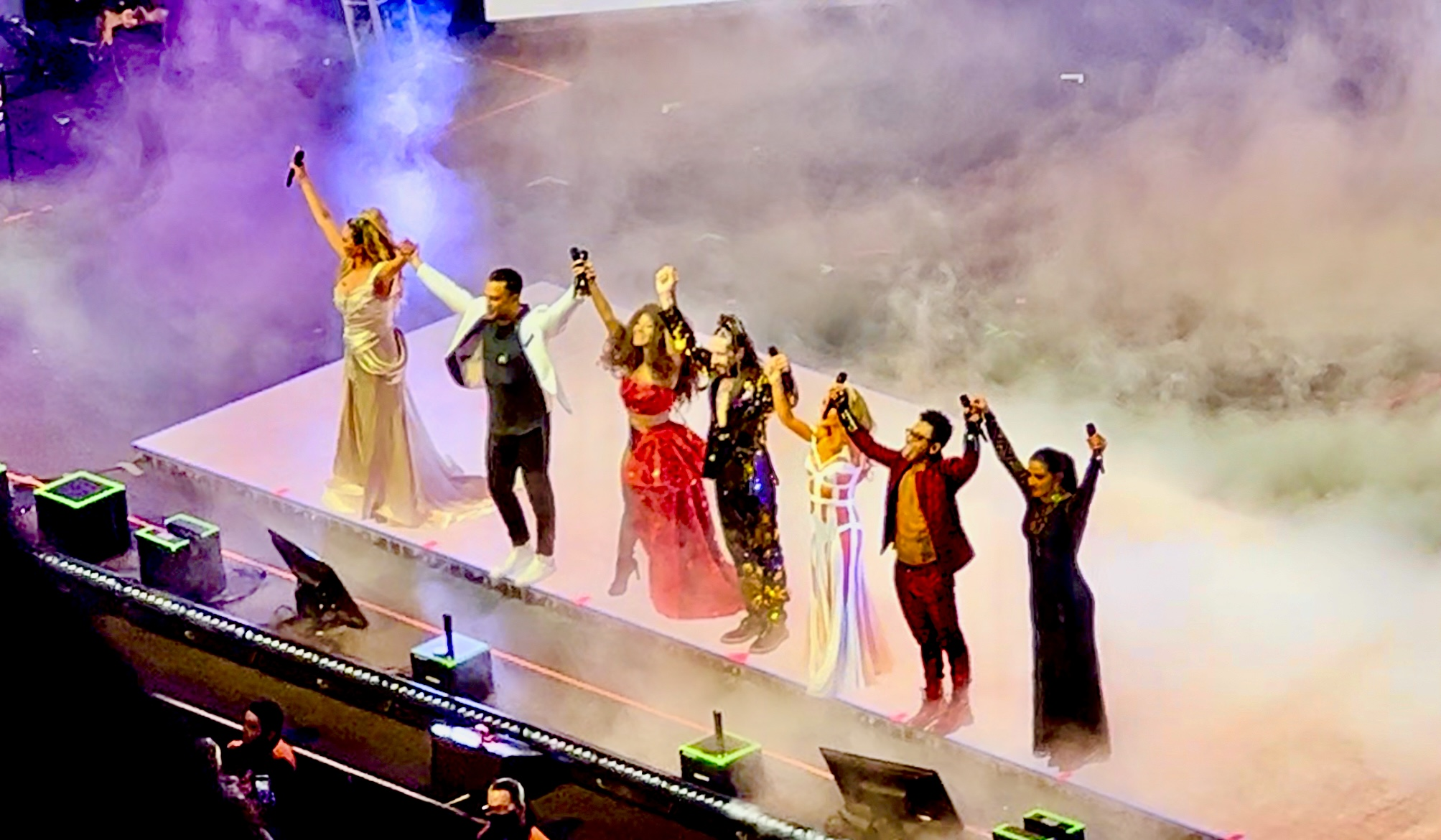
Trevi collaborated on OV7's 2012 single "Nada Es Imposible".

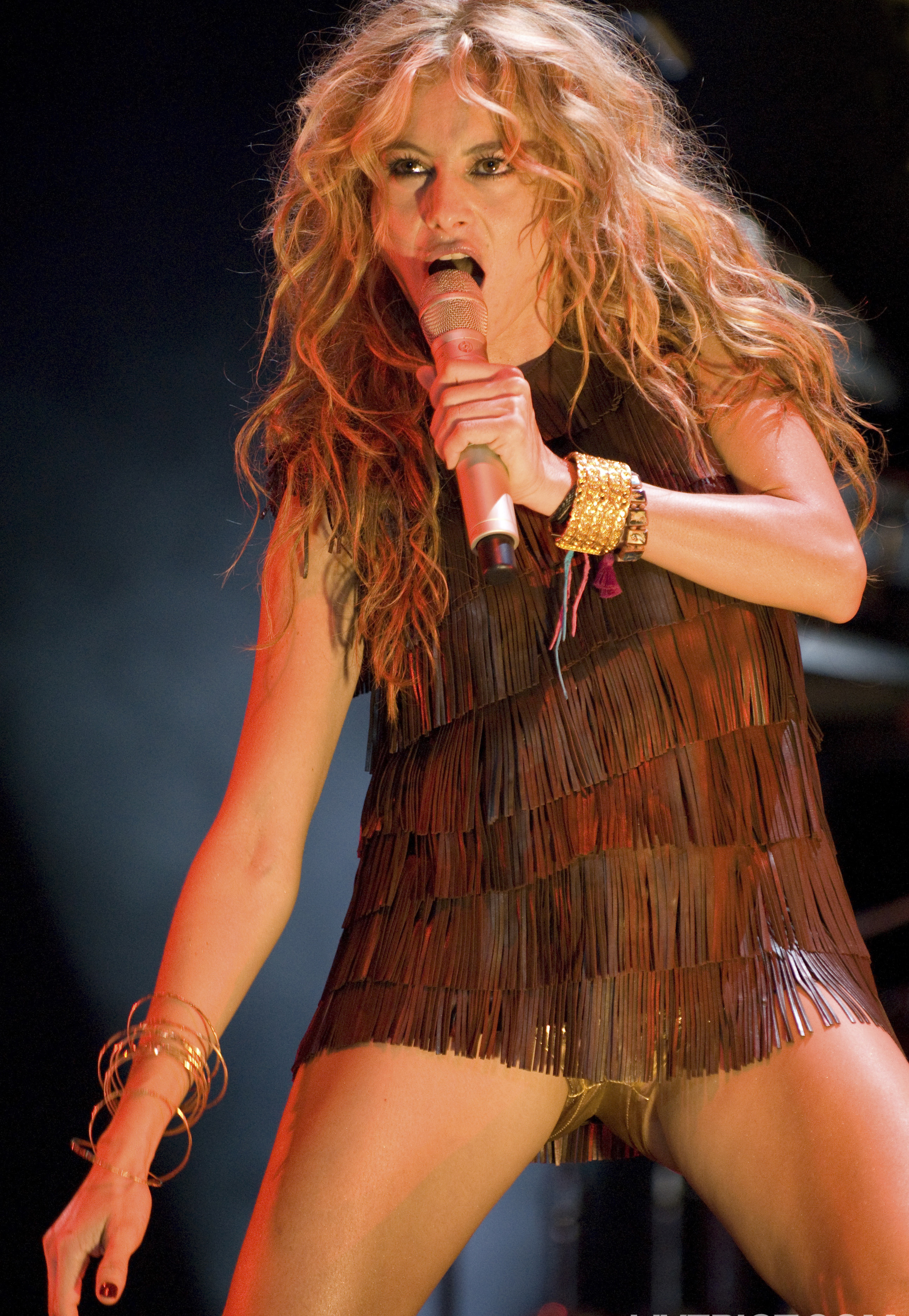
Paulina Rubio collaborated on Trevi's 2011 track "No al Alguacil".

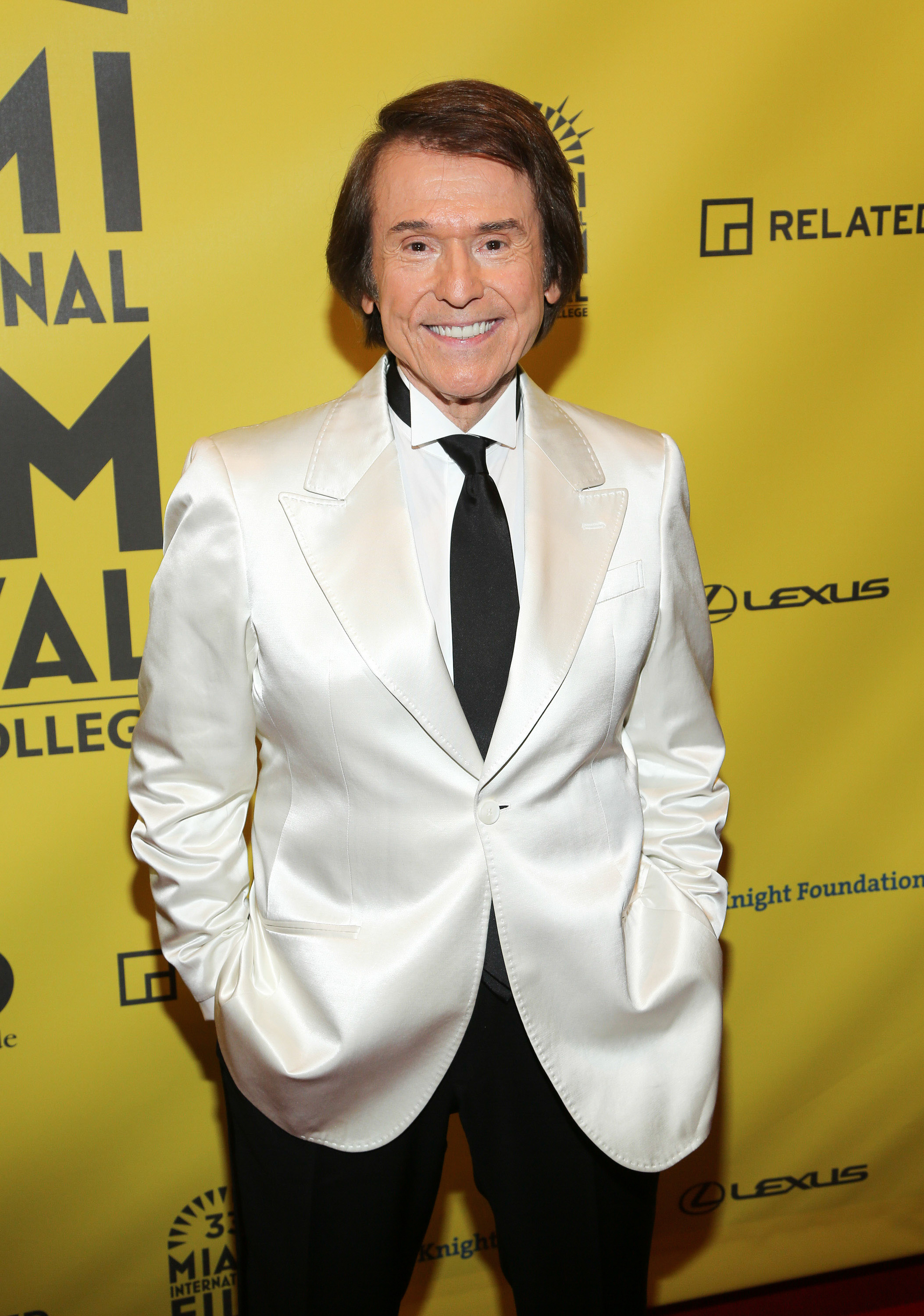
Spanish singer Raphael has invited Trevi to collaborate on his tracks on two occasions.

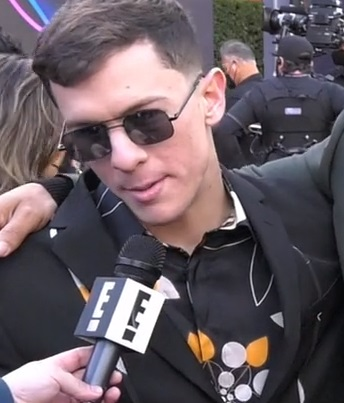
Guaynaa collaborated with Trevi for the 2022 track "Nos Volvimos Locos".

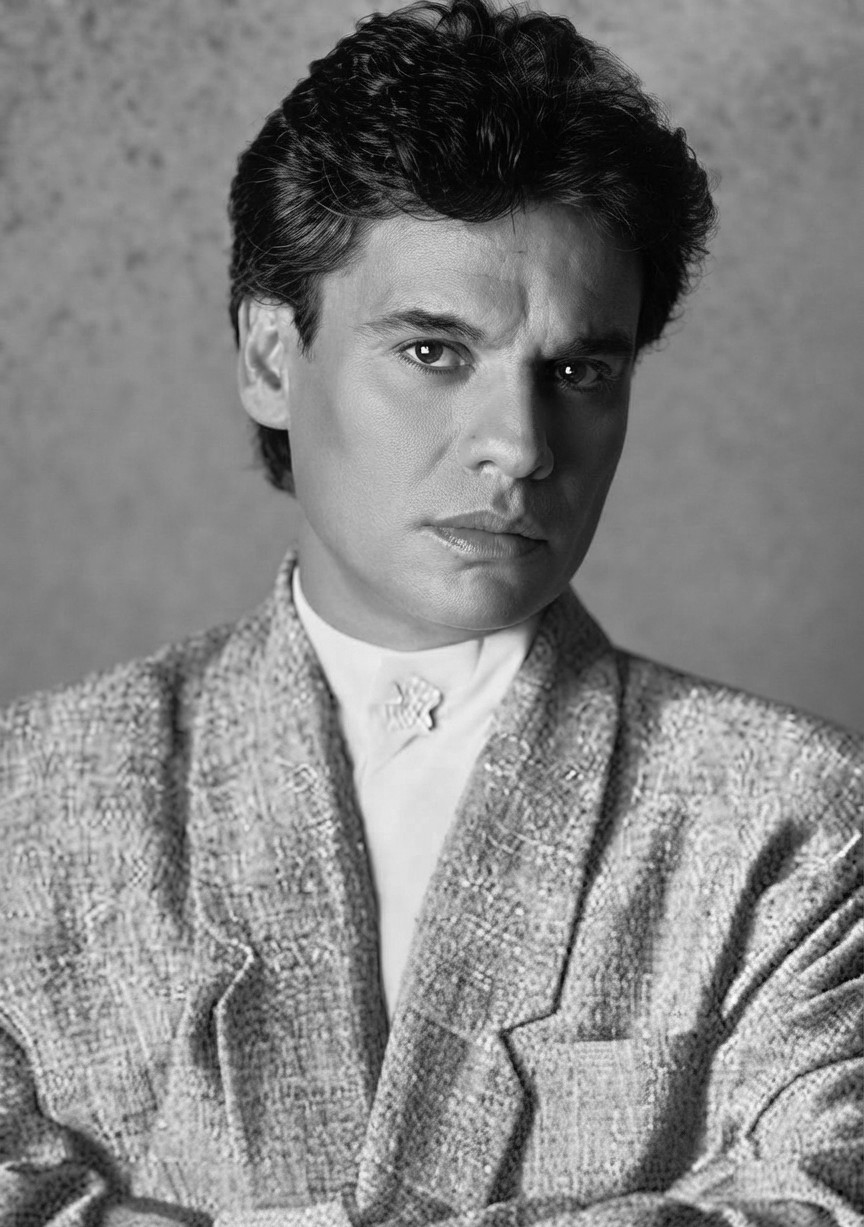
Trevi appeared on Juan Gabriel's posthumous album Los Dúo 3 in 2022.

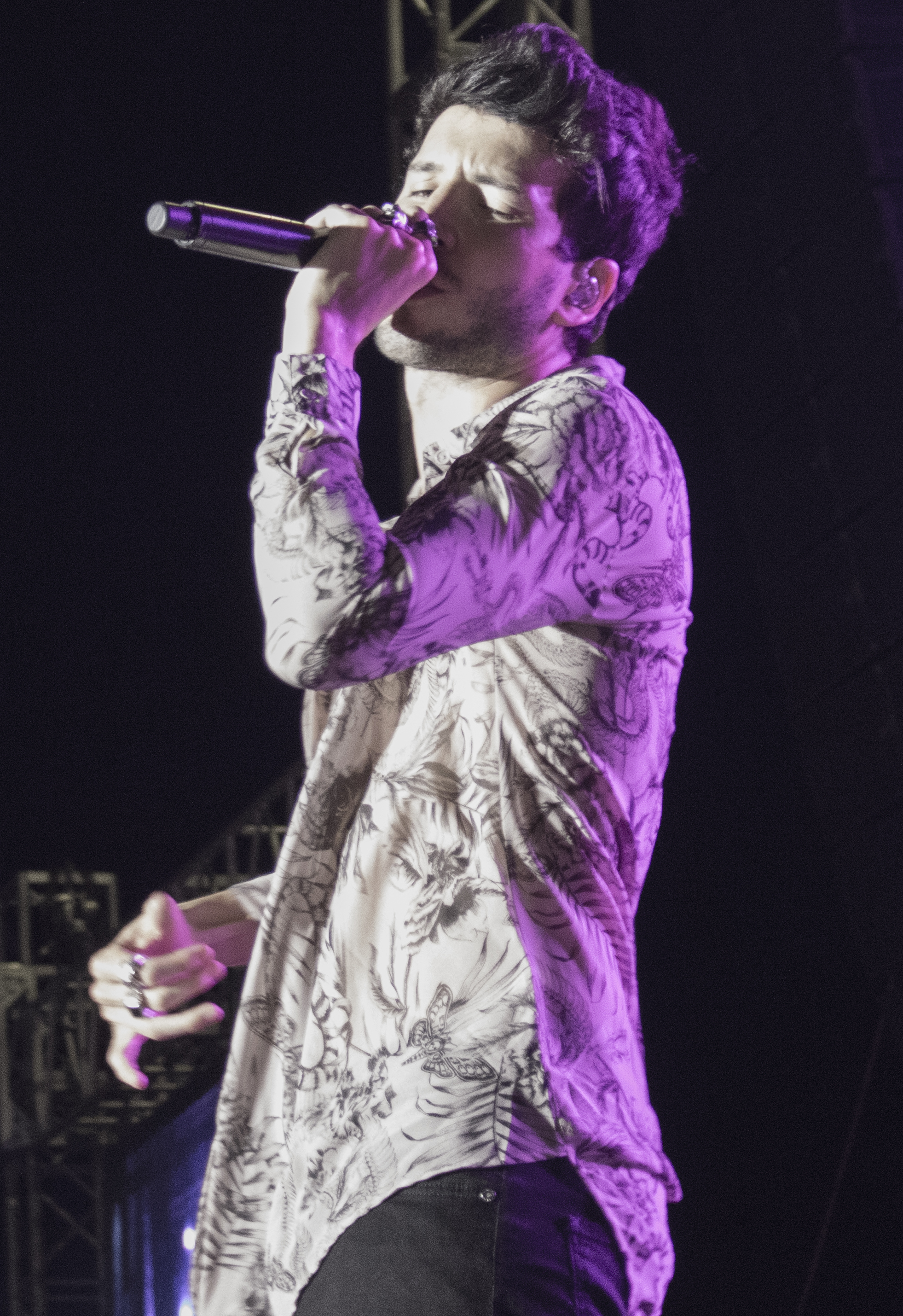
Sebastián Yatra collaborated with Trevi and Alejandra Guzmán for the remix of "Soy Tuya" in 2018.

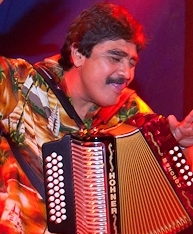
Celso Piña did a Norteña version of "Sufran Con lo Que Yo Gozo" with Trevi in 2007.

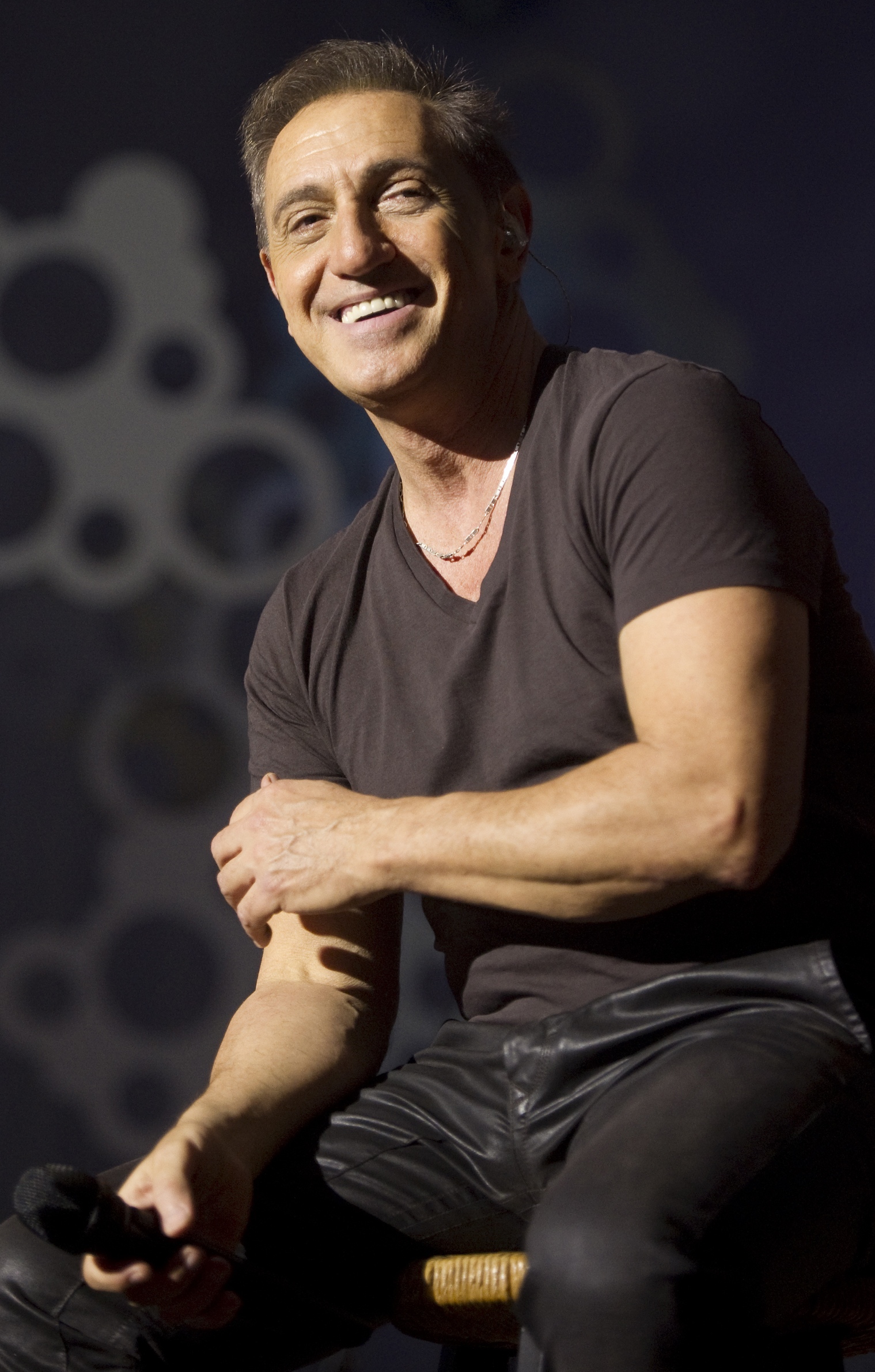
Trevi performed with Franco de Vita the track "Te Pido Sin Querer" for his live album in 2013.

Key
†	Indicates song included on an alternative version of the album
#	Indicates songs covered by Gloria Trevi (including collaborations, sometimes with the original performer)
‡	Indicates re-recorded version of a song previously released by Gloria Trevi
§	Indicates song previously released with a different title/lyrics (including those released by artists other than Gloria Trevi)

Released songs recorded by Gloria Trevi
Song	Other performer(s)	Writer(s)	Originating album	Year	Ref.
"¡Jei! (Escucha)"		Gloria Trevi	Tu Ángel de la Guarda	1991	
"¡Qué Bueno Que No Fui Lady Di!"		Gloria Trevi	Más Turbada Que Nunca	1994	
"¡Ya No!"		Gloria Trevi	Tu Ángel de la Guarda	1991	
"¡Ya No! (Versión 2024)" ‡		Gloria Trevi	Mi Soundtrack Vol. 3	2024	
"¿Por Qué Tan Triste?"		Jorge Villamizar	De Película	2013	
"¿Qué Hago Aquí? (Versión 2023)" ‡		Gloria Trevi	Mi Soundtrack Vol. 2	2023	
"¿Qué Pasa en la Azotea?"		Gustavo Velázquez	No Soy Monedita de Oro	1999	
"¿Qué Voy a Hacer Sin Él?"		Gloria Trevi	...Qué Hago Aquí?	1989	
"¿Qué Voy a Hacer Sin Él? (Versión 2023)" ‡		Gloria Trevi	Mi Soundtrack Vol. 1	2023	
"¿Y Ahora Quién?" #		Fabio Alonso Salgado; Julio C. Reyes	El Amor	2015	
"(Como Si Fuera) La Primera Vez"		Gloria Trevi	Tu Ángel de la Guarda	1991	
"20 Segundos"		Jorge Villamizar; Juan Vicente Zambrano; Luis "Papo" Márquez; Gloria Trevi	Non-album single	2013	
"A Gatas"		Mary Morín; Armando Arcos	Más Turbada Que Nunca	1994	
"A la Madre"		Mary Morín; Armando Arcos	Más Turbada Que Nunca	1994	
"Ábranse Perras"		Marcela de la Garza; Gloria Trevi	Diosa de la Noche	2019	
"Acostada a Media Calle"		Óscar Mancilla	Me Siento Tan Sola	1992	
"Agárrate"		Gloria Trevi	Tu Ángel de la Guarda	1991	
"Amarga Navidad" #		José Alfredo Jiménez	Amarga Navidad	2025	
"Amor Apache"		Gloria Trevi	Tu Ángel de la Guarda	1991	
"Amor de Hombre" #	Mocedades	Antonio Paso Díaz; Reveriano Soutullo; Juan Vert Carbonell; Enrique Reoyo y Herrera; José Silva Aramburu; Luis Gómez-Escolar; Jacobo Calderón	Infinito - Duets	2022	
"Arrúllame"		Gloria Trevi; Begoña Ibarreche; Leonor Alexandra Arreaga; Lluvia Julieta Acuña	El Vuelo	2025	
"Aurora"		Gloria Trevi	De Película	2013	
"Autoerótica"		Alex James; Gloria Trevi; Kasia Livingston; Sebastian Jacome	Gloria en Vivo †	2012	
"Bésame Aquí"		Gloria Trevi	...Qué Hago Aquí?	1989	
"Bésame Aquí (Versión 2023)" ‡		Gloria Trevi	Mi Soundtrack Vol. 2	2023	
"Bipolar"		Mario Iván Contreras; Mónica Vélez; Gloria Trevi	De Película	2013	
"BORRACHA"	María Becerra	María Becerra; Gloria Trevi; Andrés Torres; Mauricio Rengifo	Non-album single	2024	
"Cama y Mesa" #		Erasmo Carlos; Roberto Carlos	El Amor	2015	
"Cambio y Fuera"		Amérika Jiménez; Érika Ender; Gloria Trevi	Gloria †	2011	
"Carcajada"		Gloria Trevi	Me Siento Tan Sola	1992	
"Celos" #	Angel	José Luis Perales	Non-album single	2024	
"Chica Embarazada"		Mary Morín; Armando Arcos	Más Turbada Que Nunca	1994	
"Cinco Minutos"		Érika Ender; Amérika Jiménez	Una Rosa Blu	2007	
"Cinco Minutos (Duranguense Version)"	Los Horóscopos de Durango	Érika Ender; Amérika Jiménez	Una Rosa Blu †	2007	
"Cobardía"		Gloria Trevi; Aldrin Martínez Díaz; Danielle Rius; Omar A. Arrieta; YoFred	El Vuelo	2024	
"Colapso Financiero"		Gloria Trevi	Si Me Llevas Contigo	1995	
"Color Esperanza / Sólo Le Pido a Dios (Versión México)" #	Various Artists	Coti Sorokin; Leon Gieco; Diego Torres; Cachorro López	Non-album single	2020	
"Cómo Nace el Universo"		Gloria Trevi	Cómo Nace el Universo	2004	
"Como Si Fuera la Primera Vez" §		Gloria Trevi	El Amor	2015	
"Como Si Fuera la Primera Vez (Versión 2023)" ‡		Gloria Trevi	Mi Soundtrack Vol. 2	2023	
"Cómo Sufro al Recordarte" #		Heber Castro Dorantes; Armando Ávila; Juan Carlos Moguel	Diosa de la Noche (En Vivo Desde la Arena Ciudad de México)	2020	
"Cómo Sufro" #	Los Baby's	Herberth Basto	Baladas y Boleros	2017	
"Como Yo Te Amo" #		Manuel Alejandro; Ana Magdalena	El Amor	2015	
"Con los Ojos Cerrados"		Gloria Trevi	Me Siento Tan Sola	1992	
"Con los Ojos Cerrados (Versión 2023)" ‡		Gloria Trevi	Mi Soundtrack Vol. 1	2023	
"Contononeia"		Gloria Trevi	Me Siento Tan Sola	1992	
"Contononeia (Versión 2023)" ‡		Gloria Trevi	Mi Soundtrack Vol. 1	2023	
"Cosas de la Vida"		Gloria Trevi	...Qué Hago Aquí?	1989	
"Cosas de la Vida (Versión 2023)" ‡		Gloria Trevi	Mi Soundtrack Vol. 1	2023	
"Cuando Seas Grande" #	Alejandro Sanz; J Balvin; Los Tigres del Norte	Miguel Mateos	Non-album single	2016	
"Cuando un Hombre Te Enamora"	Alejandra Guzmán	Ángela Dávalos; Mario Ponce; Katia Valenzuela; Benjamín Díaz; Armando Ávila	Versus	2017	
"Cueste Lo Que Cueste"		Gloria Trevi; Áureo Baqueiro	El Vuelo	2024	
"De Película"		Sebastian Jacome; Gloria Trevi	De Película	2013	
"Demasiado Frágiles"		Érika Ender	Isla Divina	2022	
"Desahogo" #		Erasmo Carlos; Roberto Carlos	El Amor	2015	
"Despiértame"		Mónica Vélez; Pedro Debdulo; Gloria Trevi	Gloria	2011	
"Dímelo al Revés"		Andrés Torres; América Angélica Jiménez; Gloria Trevi; Julio Reyes; Mauricio Rengifo	Inmortal (En Vivo)	2016	
"Dímelo al Revés (Remix)" ‡	Cali y El Dandee	Andrés Torres; América Angélica Jiménez; Gloria Trevi; Julio Reyes; Mauricio Rengifo	Non-album single	2016	
Ding Dong		Gloria Trevi; Martha Pérez Alcocer	Amarga Navidad	2025	
"Diosa de la Noche"		Sebastian Jacome; Gloria Trevi	Diosa de la Noche	2019	
"Doña Pudor"		Gloria Trevi	Una Rosa Blu	2007	
"Dr. Psiquiatra"		Gloria Trevi	...Qué Hago Aquí?	1989	
"Dr. Psiquiatra (Cumbia)" ‡	Los Ángeles Azules	Gloria Trevi	Esto Sí Es Cumbia	2018	
"Dr. Psiquiatra (Versión 2023)" ‡		Gloria Trevi	Mi Soundtrack Vol. 1	2023	
"El Amor" #		Rafael Pérez Botija	El Amor	2015	
"El Amor Después del Amor" #		Fito Páez	El Amor	2015	
"El Código Secreto"	Beto Zapata	Lalo Ayala; Rogelio Salazar	Prisionero de Tus Brazos (Banda Version)	2011	
"El Curita, la Niña y la Loca"		Gloria Trevi	Si Me Llevas Contigo	1995	
"El Domador"		Gloria Trevi	Cómo Nace el Universo	2004	
"El Favor de la Soledad"		Gloria Trevi	Una Rosa Blu	2007	
"El Fin del Mundo"		Gloria Trevi	Si Me Llevas Contigo	1995	
"El Fin del Mundo (Versión 2024)" ‡		Gloria Trevi	Mi Soundtrack Vol. 3	2024	
"El Huevo" §		Armando Arcos; Mary Morín	Mi Soundtrack Vol. 2	2023	
"El Ingrato"		Gloria Trevi	La Trayectoria	2006	
"El Juicio"		Gloria Trevi	Más Turbada Que Nunca	1994	
"El Juicio (Versión 2023)" ‡		Gloria Trevi	Mi Soundtrack Vol. 2	2023	
"El Recuento de los Daños"		Gloria Trevi	Más Turbada Que Nunca	1994	
"Él Se Equivocó"		Marcela de la Garza; Gloria Trevi	Isla Divina	2022	
"El Secreto"		Gloria Trevi	La Trayectoria	2006	
"El Último Beso (Versión Larga)" #		Wayne Cochran; Joe Carpenter; Randall Hoyal; Bobby McGlon; Omero (Spanish adaptation)	...Qué Hago Aquí?	1989	
"El Vuelo"		Gloria Trevi; Eduardo Borges; Freddie Lugo; Kristhian Barrios	El Vuelo	2025	
"Ella Que Nunca Fue Ella"		Gloria Trevi	Si Me Llevas Contigo	1995	
"Ella Que Nunca Fue Ella (Versión 2024)" ‡		Gloria Trevi	Mi Soundtrack Vol. 3	2024	
"Ellas Soy Yo"		Marcela de la Garza; Gloria Trevi	Diosa de la Noche	2019	
"En Medio de la Tempestad"		Gloria Trevi	Cómo Nace el Universo	2004	
"Ensayando Cómo Pedirte Perdón"		Leonel García; Gloria Trevi	Isla Divina	2022	
"Eres un Santo"		Gloria Trevi	Cómo Nace el Universo	2004	
"Esa Hembra Es Mala"		Baltazar Hinojosa; Gloria Trevi; Marcela de la Garza	Gloria †	2011	
"Esta Navidad"		Gloria Trevi	Non-album single	2017	
"Ésta Sí Va Para Ti"	Alejandra Guzmán	Édgar Barrera; Gloria Trevi	Versus	2017	
"Estrella de la Mañana"		Gloria Trevi	La Trayectoria	2006	
"Estrella de la Mañana (Versión 2024)" ‡		Gloria Trevi	Mi Soundtrack Vol. 3	2024	
"Eternamente Bella" #		José Ramón Florez; Difelisatti	Versus	2017	
"Fan"		Alejandro Ramos; Gloria Trevi	Gloria †	2011	
"Fue Ese Tequila"		Óscar Mancilla	Me Siento Tan Sola	1992	
"Fuego Con Fuego"		Alex James; Gloria Trevi; Kasia Livingston; Sebastian Jacome	Gloria	2011	
"Gloria" #		Giancarlo Bigazzi; Umberto Toxxi; Trevor Veitch; Oscar Basilio Gomez Díaz (Spanish adaptation)	Gloria en Vivo	2012	
"Grande"	Mónica Naranjo	Marcela de la Garza; Gloria Trevi; Alcover; Vladimir Muñoz	Isla Divina	2022	
"Habla Blah Blah"	Shy Carter	Ángel Gabriel; Gloria Trevi; Marcela de la Garza; Shy Carter; Sebastian Jacome; Samo; Paulino Monroy	De Película	2013	
"Hey Güera & La Papa Sin Catsup" # ‡	Alejandra Guzmán	Cayre Marella; César Lazcano; Consuelo Arango Bustos; Áureo Baqueiro	Versus	2017	
"Hijoepu*#"	Karol G	Carolina Giraldo; Camilo Echeverría; Antonio Cortés; Daniel Echavarría; Mario Cáceres; Iván Barrera; Gloria Trevi	Diosa de la Noche	2019	
"Horas Tranquilas"		Gloria Trevi	Cómo Nace el Universo	2004	
"Hoy Me Iré de Casa"		Gloria Trevi	Tu Ángel de la Guarda	1991	
"Hoy Me Iré de Casa (Versión 2024)" ‡		Gloria Trevi	Mi Soundtrack Vol. 3	2024	
"Hoy No Voy a Gritar"		Gloria Trevi	Me Siento Tan Sola	1992	
"Inmaculada"		Gustavo Velázquez	Una Rosa Blu	2007	
"Inmortal"		Arbise González; Claudia Brant; Gloria Trevi; Jorge Vázquez	El Amor	2015	
"Inocente"		Gloria Trevi	Non-album single	2023	
"Intensamente"	Ángel; Armando Gómez	Gloria Trevi; Marcela de la Garza; Armando Ávila	Non-album single	2026	
"Jack, El Reprobador"		Gloria Trevi	Tu Ángel de la Guarda	1991	
"Jack El Reprobador (Versión 2023)" ‡		Gloria Trevi	Mi Soundtrack Vol. 2	2023	
"Justo Como Eres"		Marcela de la Garza; Gloria Trevi	Isla Divina	2022	
"La Acera de Enfrente"		Mary Morín	Me Siento Tan Sola	1992	
"La Boca Con Jabón"		Mary Morín; Armando Arcos	Más Turbada Que Nunca	1994	
"La Calle de la Amargura"		Gustavo Velázquez	Una Rosa Blu	2007	
"La Mujer"	Mon Laferte	Mon Laferte	SEIS	2021	
"La Noche"		Armando Ávila; Fernando Chávez; Gloria Trevi; Luis Silva; Manu Moreno	Gloria	2011	
"La Nota Roja"		Gustavo Velázquez	Cómo Nace el Universo	2004	
"La Papa Sin Cátsup"		César Lazcano	Más Turbada Que Nunca	1994	
"La Pasabas Bien Conmigo"		Óscar Mancilla	Tu Ángel de la Guarda	1991	
"La Recaída"	Timo Núñez	Marcela de la Garza; Gloria Trevi	Isla Divina	2022	
"La Renta"		Gustavo Velázquez	Más Turbada Que Nunca	1994	
"La Vida Se Va"		Sergio George; Fernando Osorio	Una Rosa Blu	2007	
"Las Pequeñas Cosas" #		Diego Verdaguer; Amanda Miguel; Graciela Beatriz Carbolla	El Amor	2015	
"Les Diré, Les Diremos"		Gloria Trevi	...Qué Hago Aquí?	1989	
"Les Diré, Les Diremos (Versión 2023)" ‡		Gloria Trevi	Mi Soundtrack Vol. 1	2023	
"Libre Para Amarte"		Maffio; Marcela de la Garza; Gloria Trevi	De Película	2013	
"Lloran Mis Muñecas"		Gloria Trevi	Si Me Llevas Contigo	1995	
"Lloran Mis Muñecas (Versión 2024)" ‡		Gloria Trevi	Mi Soundtrack Vol. 3	2024	
"Lo Que Te Toca"	Olga Tañón	Jorge Luis Piloto	Una Rosa Blu	2007	
"Lo Que una Chica Por Amor Es Capaz"		Gloria Trevi	Una Rosa Blu	2007	
"Los Borregos"		Gloria Trevi	Me Siento Tan Sola	1992	
"Los Borregos (Versión 2024)"		Gloria Trevi	Mi Soundtrack Vol. 3	2024	
"Los Perros Tristes"		Gloria Trevi	Si Me Llevas Contigo	1995	
"Mañana"		Gloria Trevi	...Qué Hago Aquí?	1989	
"Mañana (Versión 2023)" ‡		Gloria Trevi	Mi Soundtrack Vol. 2	2023	
"Más Buena"	Alejandra Guzmán	Andrés Castro; Édgar Barrera; Fanny Lu	Versus	2017	
"Matemáticas"		Marcela de la Garza; Gloria Trevi	Isla Divina	2022	
"Me Dejé Llevar"		Gilberto Elguezabal, Marcela de la Garza	El Vuelo	2025	
"Me Estoy Rompiendo en Pedazos"		Gloria Trevi	Si Me Llevas Contigo	1995	
"Me Estoy Rompiendo en Pedazos (Versión 2023)" ‡		Gloria Trevi	Mi Soundtrack Vol. 1	2023	
"Me Lloras"	Charly Black	Iván Barrera; Jonathan Bryan; Thiel; Marcela de la Garza; Gloria Trevi	Diosa de la Noche	2019	
"Me Río de Ti"		Baltazar Hinojosa; Gloria Trevi; Marcela de la Garza	Gloria	2011	
"Me Siento Tan Sola"		Gloria Trevi	Me Siento Tan Sola	1992	
"Me Siento Tan Sola (Versión 2023)" ‡		Gloria Trevi	Mi Soundtrack Vol. 2	2023	
"Mediterráneo"		Carlos Ariel Peralta; Gloria Trevi	Diosa de la Noche	2019	
"Medusa"		Milton J. Restituyo; Bruno Nicolás Fernández; Manuel Eduardo Herrero; David Agustave Picanes; Yoby Zúñiga; José Luis de la Peña	Non-album single	2023	
"Mentí"		Gloria Trevi; Marcela de la Garza	El Vuelo	2025	
"Mentiras" #	Daniela Romo	Daniela Romo; Luisa Fatello	Para Soñar	2012	
"Metida Hasta el Cuello"		Gustavo Velázquez	Cómo Nace el Universo	2004	
"Mi Cantar"	Los Ángeles Azules	Jorge Mejia Avante	De Plaza en Plaza (Cumbia Sinfónica)	2016	
"Mi Navidá (Pa Pedirte a Ti)"		Marcela de la Garza; Gloria Trevi	Tu Regalo Soy Yo	2024	
"Mientras Tú Te Ríes de Mí"		Gloria Trevi; Ivan Treviño	El Vuelo	2025	
"Mudanza de Hormiga"	María León	María León; Gloria Trevi; Marcela de la Garza; YoFred	Alquimia	2021	
"Muévete"		Gustavo Velázquez	Me Siento Tan Sola	1992	
"Mujer Maravilla"		Amerika Jiménez; Érika Ender Gloria Trevi	De Película	2013	
"Nada de Nada"	Chenoa	Mauricio Gasca; Yoel Henríquez	Desafiando la gravedad	2009	
"Nada Es Imposible (Maniac)" #	OV7	Dennis Matkosky; Michael Sembello; Fabrizio Simoncioni; Jaime Flores; Óscar Schwebel (Spanish Adaptation)	Forever 7	2012	
"Nieve de Mamey"		Gloria Trevi	Cómo Nace el Universo	2004	
"No al Alguacil"	Paulina Rubio	Kasia Livingston; Gloria Trevi; Sebastian Jacome; Paulina Rubio	Gloria	2011	
"NO ERES TÚ"	Jennifer Rojo	Ramón Arcos Bouchez	Non-album single	2021	
"No Estás Sola"		Gloria Trevi; Eduardo Borges; Freddie Lugo; Kristhian Barrios	El Vuelo	2025	
"No Hay Almohada" §		Armando Arcos; Mary Morín	Mi Soundtrack Vol. 2	2023	
"No Me Ames (Versión Banda)"		Pepe Garza; Gloria Trevi	De Película	2013	
"No Querías Lastimarme"		Ángel Gabriel; Marcela de la Garza; Gloria Trevi	De Película	2013	
"No Soy Monedita de Oro" #		Cuco Sánchez	No Soy Monedita de Oro	1999	
"No Soy un Pájaro (Versión Banda)"		Ángel Gabriel; Sebastian Jacome; Gloria Trevi	De Película	2013	
"No Soy un Pájaro"		Ángel Gabriel; Sebastian Jacome; Gloria Trevi	De Película	2013	
"No Tengo Ropa"		Gloria Trevi	...Qué Hago Aquí?	1989	
"No Tengo Ropa (Versión 2023)" ‡		Gloria Trevi	Mi Soundtrack Vol. 1	2023	
"No Vuelvas" #	Raphael	Manuel Álvarez; Beigbeder Pérez; Lucas Vidal; Daniel Clive McCallum	Sinphónico & Resinphónico	2019	
"No, No Quiero"		Gloria Trevi	Si Me Llevas Contigo	1995	
"Nos Volvimos Locos"	Guaynaa	Marcela de la Garza; Gloria Trevi; Leonel García	Isla Divina	2022	
"Para Querer Como Te Quiero"		Gloria Trevi; Ana Bárbara; Marcela de la Garza	El Vuelo	2025	
"Para Siempre Triste"	Mónica Naranjo	Gloria Trevi; Loli Molina; Marcela de la Garza; Mónica Vélez; Humberto Gatica	El Vuelo	2025	
"Pelo Suelto"		Mary Morín	Tu Ángel de la Guarda	1991	
"Pelo Suelto (2016)" ‡	Chiquis Rivera	Mary Morín	Non-album single	2016	
"Pensar En Ti"	Jorge Villamizar	Jorge Villamizar; Sergio George	Non-album single	2015	
"Perdóname" #		Camilo Blanes	El Amor	2015	
"Perfume"		Marcela de la Garza; Gloria Trevi	Isla Divina	2022	
"Poder y Fama"		Armando Ávila; Gloria Trevi	Cómo Nace el Universo	2004	
"Poder y Fama (Versión 2023)" ‡		Armando Ávila; Gloria Trevi	Mi Soundtrack Vol. 1	2023	
"Pompas de Jabón"		Gloria Trevi	Non-album single	2026	
"Popurrí Candy Crush" §		Armando Ávila; América Angélica Jiménez; Marcela de la Garza; Érika Ender; Leonel García; Juan Carlos Moguel; Gloria Trevi	Diosa de la Noche (En Vivo Desde la Arena Ciudad de México)	2020	
"Popurrí Desmadre" §		Ángel Gabriel; Armando Ávila; Baltazar Hinojosa; Fernando Chávez "Fech"; Marcela de la Garza; Manu Moreno; Sebastian Jacome; Samo; Shy Carter; Paulino Monroy; Gloria Trevi; Juan Carlos Moguel	Diosa de la Noche (En Vivo Desde la Arena Ciudad de México)	2020	
"Popurrí Divino" §		Armando Ávila; Édgard Poças; Miltón Restituyo; Julio Reyes; Gloria Trevi; Juan Carlos Moguel	Diosa de la Noche (En Vivo Desde la Arena Ciudad de México)	2020	
"Por Qué Me Haces Llorar" #	Juan Gabriel	Alberto Aguilera Valadez; Gustavo Farías	Los Dúo 3	2022	
"Por Ti"		Mary Morín; Armando Arcos	Más Turbada Que Nunca	1994	
"Pruébamelo"		Armando Ávila; Gloria Trevi	Una Rosa Blu	2007	
"Psicofonía"		Gloria Trevi	Una Rosa Blu	2007	
"Puede Ser Amor"		Marcela de la Garza; Gloria Trevi	Gloria	2011	
"Punto G"		Gloria Trevi	Gloria en Vivo †	2012	
"Q.E.P.D."		Gloria Trevi; Eduardo Borges; Freddie Lugo; Kristhian Barrios	El Vuelo	2025	
"Qué Decisión Tan Fatal"		Baltazar Hinojosa; Marcela de la Garza	Gloria †	2011	
"Que Emane"		Gloria Trevi	6 Super Hits	2009	
"Qué Hago Aquí?"		Gloria Trevi	...Qué Hago Aquí?	1989	
"Que Me Duela"		Jhoan Restituyo; Julio Reyes; Gloria Trevi	Diosa de la Noche	2019	
"Que Muera el Amor" #		G. Escolar; H. Herrero; I. Seijas	El Amor	2015	
"Que Se Acabe el Mundo"		Marcela de la Garza; Gloria Trevi	Mi Soundtrack Vol. 1	2023	
"Quítame la Ropa"		Gloria Trevi; Andrés Torres; Amérika Jiménez; Julio Reyes	Inmortal (En Vivo)	2016	
"Recostada en la Cama"		Luis Mario Álvarez; Gloria Trevi	Gloria	2011	
"Resistiré (México)"	Various Artists	Carlos Toro Montoro; Manuel de la Calva; Armando Ávila	Non-album single	2020	
"Rivales"	Alejandra Guzmán	Alejandra Guzmán; Yoel Henríquez	Versus	2017	
"Rómpeme el Corazón"		Armando Ávila; Marcela de la Garza; Gloria Trevi	Diosa de la Noche	2019	
"Sabes"		Marcela de la Garza; Gloria Trevi	De Película	2013	
"Sangre Caliente"		Marcela de la Garza; Gloria Trevi; Milton J Restituyo	Isla Divina	2022	
Santa Claus Abuelo		Gloria Trevi; Martha Pérez Alcocer	Amarga Navidad	2025	
"Satisfecha" #		Mick Jagger; Keith Richards; Gloria Trevi (Spanish adaptation)	...Qué Hago Aquí?	1989	
"Satisfecha" # ‡	Alejandra Guzmán	Mick Jagger; Keith Richards; Gloria Trevi (Spanish adaptation)	Versus	2017	
"Señor Presidente"		Gustavo Velázquez	Cómo Nace el Universo	2004	
"Sexo y Dinero"		Gustavo Velázquez	Cómo Nace el Universo	2004	
"Si Me Llevas Contigo"		Gloria Trevi	Si Me Llevas Contigo	1995	
"Si Me Llevas Contigo (Versión 2024)" ‡		Gloria Trevi	Mi Soundtrack Vol. 3	2024	
"Siempre a Mí"		Gloria Trevi	Más Turbada Que Nunca	1994	
"Siempre a Mí (Versión 2024)" ‡		Gloria Trevi	Mi Soundtrack Vol. 3	2024	
"Siempre Yo"		Gloria Trevi	Tu Ángel de la Guarda	1991	
"Siempre Yo (Versión 2023)" ‡		Gloria Trevi	Mi Soundtrack Vol. 2	2023	
"Sin Miedo a Nada"		Fernando Osorio; Gloria Trevi	El Amor	2015	
"Sobredosis"		Óscar Mancilla	Me Siento Tan Sola	1992	
"Sobrenatural"		Gloria Trevi	Gloria	2011	
"Somos el Mundo (25 Por Haiti)" #	Artistas por Haiti		Non-album single	2010	
"Soñando"		Gloria Trevi	Si Me Llevas Contigo	1995	
"Soñando (Versión 2023)" ‡		Gloria Trevi	Mi Soundtrack Vol. 2	2023	
"Soy lo Que Soy"		Marcela de la Garza; Gloria Trevi	Isla Divina	2022	
"Soy Tuya (Reloaded)"	Alejandra Guzmán; Sebastián Yatra	Andrés Torres; Julio Reyes; Marisol Herández; Mauricio Rengifo; Sebastián Yatra	Non-album single	2018	
"Soy Tuya"	Alejandra Guzmán	Andrés Torres; Julio Reyes; Marisol Herández; Mauricio Rengifo	Versus	2017	
"Sube"		Eduardo Bladinieres; Marcela de la Garza; Gloria Trevi	Isla Divina	2022	
"Súfrale"	Grupo Firme	Salvador Aponte; Cuitla Vega; Angel Sandoval; Abraham Luna	Evolución	2025	
"Sufran Con lo Que Yo Gozo"		Gloria Trevi	La Trayectoria	2006	
"Sufran Con lo Que Yo Gozo (Norteña Version)"	Celso Piña	Gloria Trevi	Una Rosa Blu †	2007	
"Sufran Con lo Que Yo Gozo (Versión 2024)" ‡		Gloria Trevi	Mi Soundtrack Vol. 3	2024	
"Tan Sólo Eres Tú"	Marcela de la Garza	Marcela de la Garza	Todo	2017	
"Te Diré Que Sí (Vestida de Azúcar 2023)" §		Leonel García; Gloria Trevi	Mi Soundtrack Vol. 1	2023	
"Te Pienso Sin Querer"	Franco De Vita	Franco De Vita	Franco de Vita Vuelve En: Primera Fila	2013	
"Te Quiero" #		José Luis Perales	El Amor	2015	
"Timbres Postales al Cielo"		Gloria Trevi	Cómo Nace el Universo	2004	
"Todos Me Miran"		Gloria Trevi	La Trayectoria	2006	
"Tribu"		Marcela de la Garza; Gloria Trevi	Diosa de la Noche	2019	
"Tu Ángel de la Guarda"		Gloria Trevi	Tu Ángel de la Guarda	1991	
"Tu Regalo Soy Yo"		Marcela de la Garza; Gloria Trevi	Tu Regalo Soy Yo	2024	
"Tú y Yo" #		Paolo Barabani; Donatella Milani; Enzo Ghinazzi; Emmanuel	El Amor	2015	
"Un Abrazo"		Gloria Trevi; Marcela de la Garza	El Vuelo	2025	
"Un Ángel de Dios (Aleluya)"		Marcela de la Garza; Gloria Trevi	Tu Regalo Soy Yo	2024	
"Un Día Más de Vida"		Gloria Trevi	Más Turbada Que Nunca	1994	
"Una Rosa Azul (Una Rosa Blu)"		A. Casella; M. Zarrillo; T. Savio; Gloria Trevi	Una Rosa Blu	2007	
"Valeria"		Alejandro Mellado; Frank Santofimio; Gloria Trevi; Yhonny Rivero	Una Rosa Blu †	2007	
"Vas a Recordarme"		Joss Favela; Gloria Trevi	Diosa de la Noche	2019	
"Ven a Cantar" #	Various Artists	José Ramón Florez; Consuelo Arango; César Ceja; Paolo Stefanoni; Omar Kawas	Eterna Navidad Celebremos	2020	
"Ven a Mi Casa Esta Navidad" #		Luis Aguilé	Eterna Navidad Celebremos	2020	
"Vestida de Azúcar"		Leonel García; Gloria Trevi	Gloria	2011	
"Virgen de las Vírgenes"		Gloria Trevi	Tu Ángel de la Guarda	1991	
"Virgen de las Vírgenes (Versión 2024)"		Gloria Trevi	Mi Soundtrack Vol. 3	2024	
"Vive" #	Kabah	Marco Flores	El Pop	2005	
"Vivir Así Es Morir de Amor" #	Raphael	Camilo Blanes; Arturo Solar	6.0	2020	
"Y Ahora Te Sorprendes"		Leonel García; Gloria Trevi	Gloria	2011	
"Y Que Soporten"	Banda MS de Sergio Lizárraga	Omar Robles; Gloria Trevi; Sergio Lizárraga; Pavel Josué Ocampo Quintero	Non-album single	2023	
"Yo Soy Su Vida"		Marcela de la Garza; Gloria Trevi	Diosa de la Noche	2019	
"Yo Tengo Hoy"		Ali J Carl Ryden; Gloria Trevi	Diosa de la Noche	2019	
"Zapatos Viejos"		Óscar Mancilla	Me Siento Tan Sola	1992	
"Zona de Riesgo"	Carlos Rivera	Gloria Trevi; Carlos Rivera; Marcela de la Garza	Non-album single	2024	
"ZORRA (Remix)"	Nebulossa	Mery Bas; Mark Dasousa	Non-album single	2024	

=== Boquitas Pintadas ===
Released songs recorded by Gloria Trevi as a member of Boquitas Pintadas
Song	Other performer(s)	Writer(s)	Originating album	Year	Ref.
"Amigo"		Pilar Ramírez	Boquitas Pintadas	1985	
"Amor Cavernícola"		Gloria Trevi	Boquitas Pintadas	1985	
"Convénceme"		Felipe Delmor	Boquitas Pintadas	1985	
"En el Amor Todo Se Vale"		Sergio Andrade	Boquitas Pintadas	1985	
"Es Culpa de Él"		Mónica Rodríguez	Boquitas Pintadas	1985	
"Espejos"		Sergio Andrade	Boquitas Pintadas	1985	
"Estos Días (No Volverán)"		Sergio Andrade	Boquitas Pintadas	1985	
"No Puedo Olvidarlo"		Sergio Andrade	Boquitas Pintadas	1985	
"Quiero Volver a Ti"		Pilar Ramírez	Boquitas Pintadas	1985	
"Se Hace Noche"		Gloria Trevi	Boquitas Pintadas	1985	

== See also ==
- Gloria Trevi discography
