= Gloria Trevi discography =

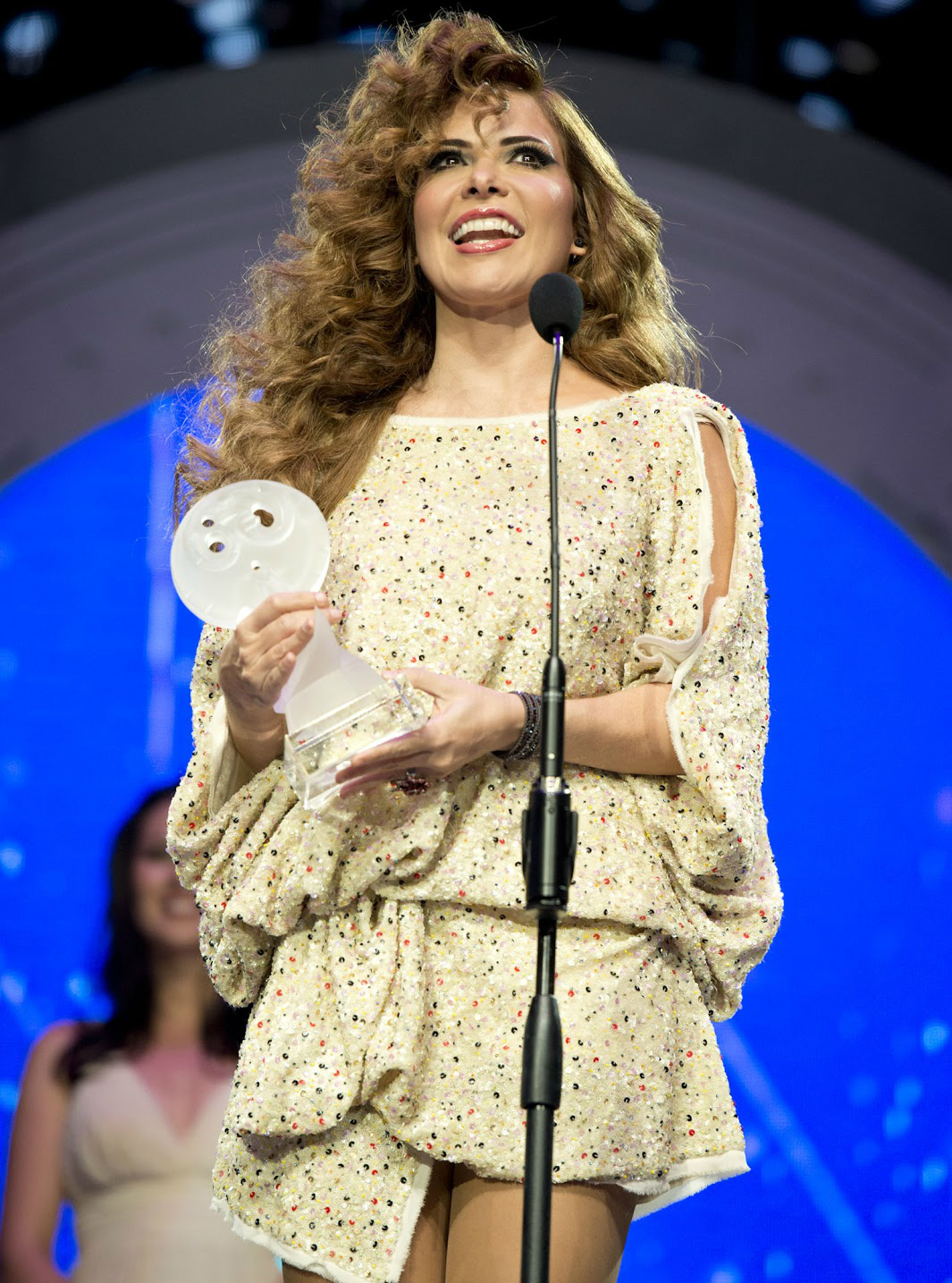
- Gloria Trevi in 2012
- Studio albums: 16
- Live albums: 5
- Compilation albums: 8
- Singles: 76

The discography of Mexican recording artist Gloria Trevi consists of sixteen studio albums, five live albums and over seventy singles. Her first album as a solo artist, ¿Qué Hago Aquí?, was released in 1989 by Sony Music. With the same label she released four more albums: Tu Ángel de la Guarda in 1990, Me Siento Tan Sola in 1992, Más Turbada Que Nunca in 1994 and Si Me Llevas Contigo in 1995, which had generally positive commercial success in Mexico and some countries in Latin America. Her first two albums have sold a combined total of 5,750,000 copies, while her third effort sold 200,000 copies according to Billboard as of November 1992. After a break of more than a decade she released six more studio albums; all got at least a Gold certification in Mexico. By 2004, she had sold 15 million copies worldwide. Since then, her worldwide sales are around 35 million records.

== Albums ==
=== Studio albums ===
Title	Details	Chart positions					Certifications
Title	Details	MEX	SPA	US			Certifications
Title	Details	MEX	SPA	200	Latin	Latin Pop	Certifications
¿Qué Hago Aquí?	Released: August, 1989; Label: Sony Music; Formats: LP, CD, Cassette	—	—	—	—	—	AMPROFON: 3x Gold
Tu Ángel de la Guarda	Released: May 29, 1991; Label: Sony Music; Formats: CD, LP, K7	—	—	—	—	4	
Me Siento Tan Sola	Released: June 1, 1992; Label: Sony Music; Formats: CD, LP, K7	—	—	—	—	8	AMPROFON: 8x Gold
Más Turbada Que Nunca	Released: January 27, 1994; Label: Sony Music; Formats: CD	—	—	—	43	—	AMPROFON: 2x Gold
Si Me Llevas Contigo	Released: December 5, 1995; Label: Sony Music; Formats: CD	—	—	—	—	—	
Cómo Nace el Universo	Released: November 23, 2004; Label: Sony Music; Formats: CD, download digital	—	—	—	—	2	RIAA: Platinum (Latin)
Una Rosa Blu	Released: September 18, 2007; Label: Universal Music; Formats: CD, download digital	5	91	169	9	3	AMPROFON: Platinum; RIAA: Gold (Latin)
Gloria	Released: March 22, 2011; Label: Universal Music; Formats: CD, download digital	1	—	71	1	1	AMPROFON: Platinum
De Película	Released: September 24, 2013; Label: Universal Music; Formats: CD, download digital	2	—	109	2	2	AMPROFON: Platinum
El Amor	Released: August 21, 2015; Label: Universal Music; Formats: CD, download digital	—	46	—	1	1	AMPROFON: Platinum+Gold
Versus (with Alejandra Guzmán)	Released: June 23, 2017; Label: Universal Music; Formats: CD, download digital	—	94	77	1	1	AMPROFON: Gold
Diosa de la Noche	Released: May 31, 2019; Label: Universal Music; Formats: CD, download digital	—	—	—	—	—	AMPROFON: Platinum+Gold; RIAA: Gold (Latin)
Isla Divina	Released: April 29, 2022; Label: Universal Music; Formats: CD, download digital	—	—	—	—	—	
Mi Soundtrack Vol. 1	Released: August 15, 2023; Label: Great Talent Records; Formats: Digital	—	—	—	—	—	
Mi Soundtrack Vol. 2	Released: September 28, 2023; Label: Great Talent Records; Formats: Digital	—	—	—	—	—	
Mi Soundtrack Vol. 3	Released: January 31, 2024; Label: Great Talent Records; Formats: Digital	—	—	—	—	—	
El Vuelo	Released: April 28, 2025; Label: Great Talent Records; Formats: Digital	—	—	—	—	—	

=== Extended Plays ===
- 2024: Tu Regalo Soy Yo
- 2025: Amarga Navidad

=== Live albums ===
Title	Details	Chart positions					Certifications (sales thresholds)
Title	Details	MEX	SPA	US			Certifications (sales thresholds)
Title	Details	MEX	SPA	200	Latin	Latin Pop	Certifications (sales thresholds)
La Trayectoria	Released: June 6, 2006; Label: Universal Music; Formats: CD, digital download	99	—	—	29	8	AMPROFON: Gold; RIAA: Gold (Latin)
Gloria En Vivo	Released: May 22, 2012; Label: Universal Music; Formats: CD, digital download	—	—	—	15	3	
Inmortal	Released: June 10, 2016; Label: Universal Music; Formats: CD, digital download	—	—	—	1	1	AMPROFON: Gold
Versus World Tour (with Alejandra Guzmán)	Released: November 17, 2017; Label: Universal Music; Formats: CD, digital download	—	—	—	38	6	AMPROFON: Gold
Diosa de la Noche (En Vivo desde la Arena Ciudad de México)	Released: August 28, 2020; Label: Universal Music; Formats: CD, digital download	—	—	—	—	—	—

=== Compilation albums ===
- 1993: Cántalo Tú Mismo (BMG Ariola)
- 1997: ¡De Pelos! Lo Mejor de la Trevi (BMG Ariola)
- 1999: No Soy Monedita de Oro (BMG Ariola)
- 1999: Rock Millenium (BMG Ariola)
- 2008: Una Rosa Blu (Deluxe Edition) (Universal)
- 2009: Lo Escencial de Gloria Trevi (Sony Music)
- 2009: 6 Super Hits (Universal)
- 2017: Pelo Suelto Con... Mis Número 1 (Sony Music)

== Singles ==
Title	Year	Peak chart positions									Certifications
Title	Year	US	US Latin	MEX	SPA	ARG	COL	VEN	BRA	ITA	Certifications
Dr. Psiquiatra	1989	—	—	1	—	—	—	—	—	—	
El Último Beso	1989	—	36	1	—	—	—	—	—	—	
Satisfecha	1989	—	—	3	—	—	—	—	—	—	
¿Que Voy a Hacer Sin El?	1989	—	22	1	38	—	—	—	—	—	
Mañana	1989			1							
¿Qué Hago Aquí?	1989			5							
Pelo Suelto	1990		19	1	1	9		3			
Tu Ángel de la Guarda	1990		20	1	5	27					
Agárrate	1991			1	1	11					
Con los Ojos Cerrados	1992	120	6	1	3	8		5			
Zapatos Viejos	1992			1	23						
Me Siento Tan Sola	1992		6	1	2	17		10			
Los Borregos	1992			10							
La Acera de Enfrente	1992			39							
La Papa Sin Catsup	1994			1	26						
A Gatas	1994										
Que Bueno Que No Fui Lady Di!	1994			7							
El Recuento De Los Daños	1994			1		6					
Siempre a Mí	1994			1							
Ella Que Nunca Fue Ella	1995			18							
Si Me Llevas Contigo	1995			26							
En Medio de la Tempestad	2004		46	2							
Todos Me Miran	2006		32	1	2	2	8	1	2	88	
Sufran con lo Que Yo Gozo	2006										
Estrella de la Mañana	2006			9							
Psicofonía	2007			8	14			7			Promusicae Gold: 20.000
Cinco Minutos	2008	108	4	2	23	13	1	1	1		
Pruébamelo	2008			1							
El Favor de la Soledad	2009			1							
Lo Que una Chica Por Amor Es Capaz	2009										
Que Emane	2009										
Me Río de Ti	2011		21	1		18		2	9		
Vestida de Azúcar	2011			1				11			
La Noche	2011			1					22		
No Soy un Pájaro	2013			1				56	89		
No Querías Lastimarme	2013		36	1		41	2	15	1		
Habla Blah Blah	2014			24				1	17		
Como Yo Te Amo	2015			1	68	33		21			
Las Pequeñas Cosas	2015			5							
Te Quiero	2015			7							
Dímelo al Revés	2016			3	81			13			Amprofon Gold: 30.000
Cuando un Hombre Te Enamora (with Alejandra Guzmán)	2017			2							Chile Gold : 5.000
Más Buena (with Alejandra Guzmán)	2017			2							
Que Me Duela	2018			1							
Me Lloras (with Charly Black)	2018			1				4			Amprofon Platinum + Gold : 90.000
Ellas Soy Yo	2018										
Vas a Recordarme	2019			16							
Hijoepu#* (with Karol G)	2019			33	54	22	59	16			RIAA Gold: 30.000
Ábranse Perras	2019			45							
Rómpeme el Corazón	2019			5							
Grande (with Mónica Naranjo)	2020			1	2						Promusicae Gold: 20.000
Demasiado Frágiles	2020										
Nos Volvimos Locos (with Guaynaa)	2021										
Ensayando Cómo Pedirte Perdón	2021										
La Recaída (with Timo Núñez)	2022										
Él Se Equivocó	2022										
Perfume	2022										
Medusa	2023										
Que Se Acabe el Mundo	2023										
Siempre Yo (Versión 2023)	2023										
Inocente	2023										
Celos (with Angel)	2024										
Zona de Riesgo (with Carlos Rivera)	2024										

=== As featured artist ===
Title	Year	Peak chart positions		Album
Title	Year	Airplay	Español Airplay	Album
"Cinco Minutos (Duranguense Version)" (with Los Horóscopos de Durango)	2008			Houston Rodeo Live
"Somos el Mundo" (with Artists for Haiti)	2010			Non-album single
"Nada Es Imposible (Maniac)" (with OV7)	2012			fOreVer7
"Te Pienso Sin Querer" (with Franco De Vita)	2013			Franco De Vita Vuelve En: Primera Fila
"Cómo Sufro" (with Los Baby's)	2017			Tributo a
"Dr. Psiquiatra (En Vivo)" (with Los Ángeles Azules)	2018			Esto Sí Es Cumbia
"No Vuelvas" (with Raphael)	2019			Sinphónico & Resinphónico
"Resistiré México" (among Artists for Mexico)	2020	15	4	Non-album single
"Color Esperanza (México)" (with various artists)	2020			Non-album single
"Vivir Así Es Morir de Amor" (with Raphael)	2021			6.0 en Concierto
"La Mujer" (with Mon Laferte)	2021			SEIS
"No Eres Tú" (with Jennifer Rojo)	2021			Non-album single
"Mudanza de Hormiga" (with María León)	2021			Non-album single
"Amor de Hombre" (with Mocedades)	2022			Non-album single
"Y Que Soporten" (with Banda MS)	2023			Non-album single
"Zorra (Remix)" (with Nebulossa)	2024			Non-album single
