= Gloria (Gloria Trevi album) =

Studio album by Gloria Trevi
- Released: March 22, 2011
- Recorded: 2010
- Genre: Latin pop, electropop, dance-pop
- Length: 36:25 (Standard edition)
- Label: Universal Music Latino
- Producer: Armando Ávila, Cirkut, Dr. Luke, Sebastian J.

Gloria Trevi chronology
Una Rosa Blu (2007)	Gloria (2011)	De Película (2013)

Singles from Gloria
- 1. "Me Río de Ti" Released: January 11, 2011; 2. "Vestida de Azúcar" Released: May 6, 2011; 3. "La Noche" Released: September 1, 2011

Gloria is the eighth studio album by Mexican singer-songwriter Gloria Trevi. It was released on March 22, 2011 by Universal Music Latin, after a four-year gap since the release of her last studio album, Una Rosa Blu. Trevi worked as co-writer for the album tracks, while Armando Avila, Sebastián Jácome, Dr. Luke and Cirkut worked as the record producers. The themes of the songs are her personal feelings, female empowerment, survival and romantic love.

The album received mostly positive reviews and entered atop the charts in Mexico and the United States. The first single, "Me Río de Ti", also received praise and peaked at number-one in Mexico, while the song "No al Alguacil" features Mexican superstar Paulina Rubio. "Vestida de Azúcar" and "La Noche" were also released as singles. A deluxe edition was also released, including as a bonus track the song "Esa Hembra es Mala", the main theme for the Mexican telenovela Teresa.

== Background ==
In 2007, Trevi released her seventh studio album Una Rosa Blu, which became very successful, spending 121 weeks inside the Mexican Album Chart. Una Rosa Blu yielded five number-one singles in Mexico and earned recognition, such as a Lo Nuestro and Billboard awards. Since the album sold half a million units throughout Latin America, Trevi realized that her next release had to be better than the previous one, so she took the time to choose and write about many issues. Gloria was recorded in London, Los Angeles, New York City, Miami and Mexico under the guidance of Armando Avila and Sebastián Jácome. The singer declared that the album is dedicated to women, since "the girls are the ones who buy albums. If there comes a handsome guy and sings to us something that touches our heart is cool, but it is harder for a woman to understand another woman". The album title was chosen after Trevi's mother, who also is named Gloria: "It is a tribute to my mother and to my grandmother, my mother named me Gloria after them, but especially I did it for my mom, who was going through a very intense situation at the time I was working on the album."

== Music and lyrics ==
Gloria includes 10 songs covering various musical genres such as pop, disco and rock. Trevi said: "We chose 10 songs, but the rest will be released on a deluxe edition." The lyrics, as usual for previous albums by the singer, are based on passages of her life. "I have always been an open book. I started singing about 'old shoes' and 'psychiatrists', but invariably honest, even when the hypocritical society hits me." "Fuego con Fuego" (Fire with Fire) and "Me Río de Ti" (I Laugh at You) are musicalized with synthesizers, drums and guitar riffs. About the "Fuego" lyrics, Trevi imagined herself glowing and her hair on fire, after being applied "a lot of peroxide" to clarify her usual brown hair. Trevi said about "Me Río de Ti": "I loved the melody, I loved the concept of the song, but it was a little short so I wrote a little part of it." Trevi met songwriter Mariana De La Garza, and she had "a face of someone who has a broken heart", so the success of the song was a very good revenge for both, "Now she is going to laugh at him and he will mourn without her." The lyrics of the track "No al Alguacil" deal with control and monitored loving relationships and features guest vocals by Mexican singer Paulina Rubio.

Two tracks are written by singer-songwriter Leonel García, of the Sin Bandera fame, "Vestida de Azúcar" (Dress with Sugar) and "Y Ahora Te Sorprendes" (And Now You Are Surprised) which are named Trevi's favorite songs from the album. "Vestida de Azúcar" is a song about regret, when a person prefers to have a good memory, even when it hurts; the latter represents the union of women with nature. "Recostada en la Cama" (Lying in Bed) is a cover version of a song previously recorded by Banda performer El Chapo de Sinaloa.

On the deluxe edition, the album includes "Esa Hembra es Mala" (This Female Is Bad), the main theme for the Mexican telenovela Teresa, written and performed by Trevi and produced by Sebastian Jacome and Rayito. The song received a TVyNovelas award nomination for Best Telenovela Song, which it lost to "Cuando Me Enamoro", by Spanish singer-songwriter Enrique Iglesias featuring Juan Luis Guerra. Another song from the deluxe edition is "Fan", a song dedicated to Trevi's longtime musical idols The Rolling Stones. Previous to this song, Trevi recorded a Spanish-language version of the track "(I Can't Get No) Satisfaction", written by Mick Jagger and Keith Richards, on her debut album ¿Qué Hago Aquí? (1989).

With Gloria, Trevi wanted to have another kind of relation with her audience and follow the story that began with her "painful" songs, such as "El Recuento de los Daños" (The Recount of the Damages), evolving in "En Medio de la Tempestad" (The Midst of The Storm), watching her in "Todos Me Miran" (Everybody Looks at Me), having "Cinco Minutos" (Five Minutes), and reaching the "glory".

== Singles ==
The album's lead single, "Me Río de Ti", was released on January 11, 2011. The music video for the song was directed by Argentine filmmaker Gustavo Garzón, who worked with Trevi for the first time. The track peaked at number 19 on the Billboard Latin Songs chart and at number one, for 9 consecutive weeks, on the Mexican Airplay chart. "Vestida de Azúcar" was selected as the second single and released in May 2011. The album's third single, "La Noche", peaked at the top of the airplay charts in Mexico.

== Reception ==
Professional ratings
Review scores
Source	Rating
About.com	4/5 stars
AllMusic	4.5/5 stars
Club Fonograma	(43/100)

The album received mixed reviews. Juan Mesa of About.com said that Gloria has a "higher volume" from Trevi's previous albums, to keep pace with Lady Gaga, Katy Perry and Shakira; with the duet with fellow Mexican singer Paulina Rubio, "No al Alguacil", being the highest point of the album. AllMusic's Jon O'Brien referred to the album as "far from her best work", being a "a solid, if slightly derivative, record which should further re-establish her legendary Latin pop status". O'Brien also stated that Trevi was more convincing on tracks such as "La Noche", "Pudo Ser Amor", and "Recostada en la Cama", all of which reminds "her late-'80s and early-'90s heyday". At the Mexican Premios Oye! of 2012, Gloria received a nomination for Best Female Pop Album. Gloria was also nominated for a Lo Nuestro Award for Pop Album of the Year.

The album debuted at the top of the charts in Mexico and the United States. Gloria entered the Billboard Top Latin Albums chart at number-one, surpassing her highest placement in the chart, Cómo Nace el Universo (2005), which peaked at number four. The following week the album dropped to number four. Gloria peaked at number 71 in the Billboard 200, the main album chart in the United States, 98 places higher than Una Rosa Blu, which reached 169. In Mexico, the album also debuted at number-one and received a gold certification by the Asociación Mexicana de Productores de Fonogramas y Videogramas three days after its release.

== Track listing ==
This track listing adapted from AllMusic.

No.	Title	Writer(s)	Producer(s)	Length
1.	"Fuego Con Fuego"	Gloria Treviño, Sebastián Jácome, Alex James, Kasia Livingston	Sebastian J.	03:57
2.	"Me Río De Tí"	Treviño, Marcela De La Garza, Baltazar Hinojosa	Armando Avila	03:37
3.	"Sobrenatural"	Treviño	Avila	03:38
4.	"No Al Alguacil" (Featuring Paulina Rubio)	Treviño, Paulina Rubio, Gottwald, Walter, Jácome, Livingston	Dr. Luke, Cirkut	03:48
5.	"Vestida De Azúcar"	Leonel García, Treviño	Avila	04:06
6.	"Puede Ser Amor"	Treviño, De La Garza	Avila	03:18
7.	"La Noche"	Treviño, Avila, Manú Moreno	Avila	03:35
8.	"Y Ahora Te Sorprendes"	Treviño, García	Avila	03:37
9.	"Despiértame"	Treviño, Pedro Dabdoub	Avila	03:20
10.	"Recostada En La Cama"	Mario Puparro, Adolfo Valenzuela, Omar Valenzuela	Avila	03:38

Deluxe edition
No.	Title	Writer(s)	Producer(s)	Length
1.	"Fuego Con Fuego"	Gloria Treviño, Sebastián Jácome, Kasia Livingston	Sebastian J.	03:57
2.	"Me Río De Tí"	Treviño, Marcela De La Garza, Baltazar Hinojosa	Armando Avila	03:37
3.	"Sobrenatural"	Treviño	Avila	03:38
4.	"No Al Alguacil" (Featuring Paulina Rubio)	Treviño, Jácome, Livingston, Rubio	Sebastian J.	03:48
5.	"Vestida De Azúcar"	Treviño, Leonel García	Avila	04:06
6.	"Puede Ser Amor"	Treviño, De La Garza	Avila	03:18
7.	"Cambio Y Fuera"	Treviño	Avila	03:32
8.	"La Noche"	Treviño, Avila, Manú Moreno	Avila	03:35
9.	"Y Ahora Te Sorprendes"	Treviño, García	Avila	03:37
10.	"Despiértame"	Treviño, Pedro Dabdoub	Avila	03:20
11.	"Que Decisión Tan Fatal"	Treviño	Avila	03:26
12.	"Fan"	Treviño, Avila	Avila	03:29
13.	"Recostada En La Cama"	Mario Puparro, Adolfo Valenzuela, Omar Valenzuela	Avila	03:38
14.	"Esa Hembra Es Mala"	De La Garza, Hinojosa, Treviño	Sebastian J., Rayito	03:58
15.	"Me Río De Tí (Behind the Scenes: Video shoot)"	Gloria Trevi, De La Garza, Hinojosa	Avila	03:37
16.	"Me Río De Tí (Closed-captioned)"	Gloria Trevi, De La Garza, Hinojosa	Avila	03:46
17.	"Alcanzando La Gloria"

== Charts ==
=== Weekly charts ===
Chart (2011)	Peak position
Mexico (Top 100 Mexico)	1
U.S. Billboard 200	71
U.S. Latin Albums (Billboard)	1
U.S. Latin Pop Albums (Billboard)	1

=== Year-end charts ===
Chart (2011)	Position
Mexican Albums Chart	11
US Billboard Latin Albums	22
US Billboard Latin Pop Albums	9

== Certifications and sales ==
Region	Certification	Certified units/sales
Mexico (AMPROFON)	Platinum	60,000^{^}
^{^} Shipments figures based on certification alone.

== Personnel ==
- Gloria Trevi – main performer, co-producer, vocals, lyricist
- Armando Avila – record producer, lyricist
- Sebastián Jácome – record producer, songwriter
- Paulina Rubio – featured vocals

== Release info ==
Region	Date	Format	Label
Argentina	March 22, 2011	CD, digital download (standard and deluxe edition)	Universal Music Latin
Chile	March 22, 2011	CD, digital download (standard and deluxe edition)	Universal Music Latin
Colombia	March 22, 2011	CD, digital download (standard and deluxe edition)	Universal Music Latin
Costa Rica	March 22, 2011	CD, digital download (standard and deluxe edition)	Universal Music Latin
El Salvador	March 22, 2011	CD, digital download (standard and deluxe edition)	Universal Music Latin
Guatemala	March 22, 2011	CD, digital download (standard and deluxe edition)	Universal Music Latin
Honduras	March 22, 2011	CD, digital download (standard and deluxe edition)	Universal Music Latin
Mexico	March 22, 2011	CD, digital download (standard and deluxe edition)	Universal Music Latin
Spain	March 22, 2011	CD, digital download (standard and deluxe edition)	Universal Music Latin
United States	March 22, 2011	CD, digital download (standard and deluxe edition)	Universal Music Latin

== See also ==
- List of number-one albums of 2011 (Mexico)
- List of number-one Billboard Latin Albums from the 2010s
- List of number-one Billboard Latin Pop Albums of 2011
