= La Trayectoria =

La Trayectoria may refer to:

- La Trayectoria (Luny Tunes album), 2005
- La Trayectoria (Gloria Trevi album), 2006

== See also ==
- Mi Trayectoria, an album by Don Chezina
- Mi Trayectoria, an album by Héctor el Father
