= Cómo Nace el Universo =

2004 studio album by Gloria Trevi

Cómo Nace el Universo!

Studio album by Gloria Trevi
- Released: November 23, 2004 (Mexico)
- Recorded: 1998–2000
- Genre: Pop rock
- Label: Sony International

Gloria Trevi chronology
Si Me Llevas Contigo (1995)	Cómo Nace el Universo! (2004)	La Trayectoria (2006)

Singles from Cómo Nace el Universo
- 1. "En Medio de La Tempestad" Released: 2004; 2. "El Domador" Released: 2004; 3. "Eres un Santo" Released: 2005

Cómo Nace El Universo (How the Universe is Born) is the sixth studio album released by Mexican singer Gloria Trevi. Trevi resumed her musical career with this album, which was produced by Armando Ávila and published in November 2004. It is her first release after the singer got out of jail in September 2004, where she was for almost five years. In addition, this is her first album not to be produced by her long-time collaborator Sergio Andrade and it is a follow-up to her album Si Me Llevas Contigo, which was released nine years earlier.

The themes in the album include women empowerment, fame, money, death, freedom, politics, press sensationalism, loyalty, and love. All of the songs were composed by Trevi both in jail and also during the time before she was arrested. During the early stages of the recording of this album, Trevi had to collaborate with her record producer through a phone in Chihuahua's prison, singing to him the material she created in her cell. She received Gold and Platinum certifications in the United States as well as a nomination for best Latin pop album for Billboard magazine. The first single En Medio De La Tempestad (Amidst the tempest) received moderate success on radio. This song was composed by Trevi around 2001 while she was captive in Brazil, and she performed snippets of the early versions of it in several TV interviews behind bars. It was dedicated to the fans that kept on supporting her after her imprisonment. The music video for "En Medio de la Tempestad" also received moderate success on TV, although the song eventually became a fan-favorite. The album received mixed to positive reviews in spite of the fact that Trevi's image had been heavily damaged by the media and the scandals in previous years. El Domador (The tamer) and Eres Un Santo (You're a saint) did not achieve the expected success due to the merger of BMG with Sony Music Entertainment, in which promotion was affected.

The song "Timbres Postales Al Cielo", which was composed by Trevi in Brazil's jail in 2000, was dedicated to her deceased first-born daughter Ana Dalay, who died by unknown reasons being 33-days old and whose body was disposed of by Argentinian Liliana Soledad Regueiro in a river in Brazil, on the orders of Sergio Andrade. She sang snippets of the song in several TV interviews for different countries, including a British documentary about the "Trevi-Andrade clan", and she always ended up crying. The song "Nieve de Mamey" was dedicated to one of Trevi's cellmates and her also convicted husband in Chihuahua's jail. Furthermore, "Eres Un Santo" was dedicated to Gloria Trevi's boyfriend Armando Gómez, whom she met in Chihuahua's prison. On the other hand, Trevi performed a snippet of an early version of the song "Cómo Nace el Universo" in 1998 (the year before being arrested) in a Mexican TV interview in her family's house in Monterrey, in which she stated that she was working on her supposed "new" album and it was almost ready to be released. The song "Poder Y Fama" is based on a 1991 song called "Rondas Infantiles" by Miguel Pizarro, which was produced by Sergio Andrade. Trevi performed the song "El Domador" in a Mexican TV show called "No Manches" in 2005.

Several other songs which were expected to be included in this album were recorded, composed, or performed live on TV during the time the album was conceived. In 1998 Trevi performed a snippet of an early version of the song "Doña Pudor" in the Mexican TV show Otro Rollo and it was later included in her 2007 album Una Rosa Blu. She also performed another new song in this show, "Qué Pasa En la Azotea", which was released in her compilation album called No Soy Monedita De Oro the following year. According to Trevi's biographical TV series Ellas Soy Yo "Que Pasa En La Azotea" was created during the sessions of the recording of her 1994 album Más Turbada Que Nunca, but it was discarded in order to be released later. Snippets of a song called "Policromías de Delfín", which was dedicated to her son Ángel Gabriel who was born when she was under arrest in Brazil, was performed by Trevi in several TV interviews in and out of prison, but it remains unreleased. Trevi recorded a series of other unreleased songs while she was in Chihuahua's prison during 2003-2004, which were given as "gifts" to friends, such as Niurka Marcos. These songs, according to Niurka herself, have the particular acoustics of the cells in the jail. The song "El Favor De La Soledad" was also composed by Trevi during this period, but was released later for her album Una Rosa Blu (2007), as well as the song "Estrella De La Mañana", which was released in her compilation album La Trayectoria in the year 2006, both songs dedicated to her husband Armando Gómez. Trevi performed a snippet of "Estrella De La Mañana" in an interview the very same day she was released from jail in September 2004, being the only song she sang in front of cameras that day.

Trevi promoted the album by performing in a number of TV shows in different countries between 2004 and 2005. Also, she embarked on a tour called "Trevolution Tour" to promote the album, which at some point in 2005 had to be canceled due to Trevi's pregnancy. The songs performed in this tour were recorded for Trevi's album La Trayectoria, released two years after this album. Trevi's image during this era was more mature and refined in comparison to her previous more outlandish and risqué looks and outfits.

== Track listing ==
No.	Title	Length
1.	"Cómo Nace el Universo (How the Universe is Born)"	04:53
2.	"Eres un Santo (You're a Saint)"	03:29
3.	"Nieve de Mamey (Mamey Ice Cream)"	03:04
4.	"Señor Presidente (Mr. President)"	02:55
5.	"Metida Hasta el Cuello (Up to My Neck)"	04:02
6.	"Timbres Postales al Cielo (Postage Stamps to Heaven)"	03:58
7.	"Horas Tranquilas (Calm Hours)"	03:25
8.	"La Nota Roja (The Red Note)"	03:42
9.	"El Domador (The Tamer)"	03:12
10.	"Sexo y Dinero (Sex & Money)"	03:19
11.	"Poder y Fama (Power and Fame)"	03:05
12.	"En Medio de La Tempestad (In the Midst of the Storm)"	03:49
Total length:		42:53

== Charts ==
Chart (2004)	Peak position
US Top Latin Albums (Billboard)	4
US Latin Pop Albums (Billboard)	2

== Sales and certifications ==
Region	Certification	Certified units/sales
United States (RIAA)	Platinum (Latin)	100,000^{^}
^{^} Shipments figures based on certification alone.
