= El Domador =

- Release date: 1954
- Country: Argentina
- Language: Spanish

El Domador is a 1954 film of the classical era of Argentine cinema.
