= Si Me Llevas Contigo =

Si me llevas contigo

Studio album by Gloria Trevi
- Released: December 5, 1995 (Mexico)
- Label: Sony International
- Producer: Sergio Andrade

Gloria Trevi chronology
Más Turbada Que Nunca (1994)	Si me llevas contigo (1995)	Cómo Nace el Universo (2004)

Singles from Si Me Llevas Contigo
- 1. "Ella Que Nunca Fue Ella" Released: 1995; 2. "Si Me Llevas Contigo" Released: 1996

Si me llevas contigo (If You Take Me With You) is the fifth studio album by Mexican singer Gloria Trevi. The album was released in November 1995 by BMG Ariola. Sergio Andrade produced her last album in the 1990s before both were arrested in 2000 for corruption of minors. Si Me Llevas Contigo is one of the albums recorded in a home studio in Cuernavaca and Los Angeles, California. The ten songs on this studio production showed an image of Trevi as a producer a composer, exploring controversial themes such as homosexuality, chastity, religion, frustration, economic crisis, political corruption, and even suicide.

== Background and release ==
Televisa banned Trevi after some personal conflicts between her manager Andrade and the company owner after Andrades' company, "Conexiones Americanas," sold the rights of two of their programs to TV Azteca. Trevi was absent from multiple channels broadcast by the end of that year, and in return, the album's promotion was negatively affected. Ella Que Nunca Fue Ella (She Who Was Never Herself) and Si Me Llevas Contigo (if you take me with you) were the only two singles from the album which had moderate success on the radio, even as ballads. Lloran Mis Muñecas (My Wrists Cry) was planned as a third single but was canceled because it was a theme blatantly alluding to suicide and would hurt Trevi's image more.

Several projects that the artist and her team were working on were cut short due to the supposed illness of her manager, Andrade. Among them, there were plans to record a soap opera starring Gloria Trevi under the title of Angels to be released in March 1996 by the TV Azteca television company. Trevi promoted the album in several TV Azteca programs such as "En Medio Del Espectáculo" and "Ventaneando," both hosted by Paty Chapoy, who acclaimed the album constantly, and she was very close to Andrade. TV Azteca promoted this album right after its release and at the beginning of 1996. For a period, the album was played nationwide every night and in the early morning by TV Azteca when no shows were being broadcast.

== After the release ==
On March 13, 1996, the singer Gloria Trevi announced that she would retire from performing live due to her manager Sergio Andrades' cancer. She offered her last two concerts at the National Auditorium, on 16 and 17 March. TV Azteca broadcast these concerts. The singer's claims over Andrade's cancer have never been verified, and the press later speculated that he was never ill. Eventually, it was confirmed that Andrade suffered from the Guillain-Barré syndrome, diagnosed while he and Trevi were imprisoned in Brazil.

After negotiations with TV Azteca in August of that year, Gloria Trevi signed an exclusive contract with Televisa instead. According to the contract she signed with Televisa, Gloria was committed to making four telenovelas (soap operas) and six films and hosting a program in primetime, which would be her first project in 6 years. She returned to the company as the highest-paid Mexican star. Trevi resumed the promotion of the album on Televisa, performing songs in a string of live shows in this company. On September 16, 1996, Trevi returned to the small screen with a live XETU Remix program. The program was a 21st-century style rework of a program called XETU which was broadcast in Mexico in the eighties, in which Gloria made an appearance for the first time on television after winning the contest for the double of a famous actress back then called Lucerito. Due to low ratings and difficult situations backstage, the show's broadcast was concluded on January 3, 1997.

In press conferences during 1996, Trevi stated that she decided to sign with Televisa simply because they offered her a bigger project budget, as opposed to TV Azteca, who offered her a restricted budget. In an interview in jail in Brazil in 2001, Trevi stated that before signing her contract with Televisa, she called Ricardo Salinas Pliego, owner of TV Azteca, to let him know what she would be signing with Televisa instead of TV Azteca. She stated: "I thought I was free to choose, so I did what anyone would have done, and I followed my heart... by the tone of his voice and the kind of words he used against me, I knew he was not happy, and I knew that they (TV Azteca) would do things to harm me in the future."

== Track listing ==
No.	Title	Writer(s)	Length
1.	"El Fin del Mundo (The End of the World)"	Gloria Trevi	03:12
2.	"Si me Llevas Contigo (If You Take Me with You)"	Gloria Trevi	03:31
3.	"Colapso Financiero"	Gloria Trevi	02:57
4.	"Ella que Nunca Fue Ella"	Gloria Trevi	03:47
5.	"El Curita, la Niña y la Loca"	Gloria Trevi	04:15
6.	"Los Perros Tristes"	Gloria Trevi	03:57
7.	"Me Estoy Rompiendo en Pedazos"	Gloria Trevi	03:48
8.	"No, No Quiero"	Gloria Trevi	03:42
9.	"Lloran mis Muñecas"	Gloria Trevi	03:42
10.	"Soñando"	Gloria Trevi	04:30
Total length:			37:21
