= Tu Ángel de la Guarda =

Studio album by Gloria Trevi
- Released: May 29, 1991 (Mexico)
- Recorded: 1990
- Studio: Milagro Sound Recorders, Glendale, CA.
- Genre: Pop rock, alternative pop
- Label: Ariola
- Producer: Sergio Andrade

Gloria Trevi chronology
¿Qué Hago Aquí? (1989)	Tu Ángel de la Guarda (1991)	Me Siento Tan Sola (1992)

Tu Ángel de la Guarda ("Your Guardian Angel") is the second studio album by Mexican singer Gloria Trevi, released in 1991. It features some of her most notable songs, including the hit single "Pelo Suelto", as well as "Tu Ángel de la Guarda", "Ya No", "Virgen de las Vírgenes", and "Hoy Me Iré de Casa". The album drew attention for its controversial themes, which distinguished it from contemporaneous releases by other artists such as Lucero. For example, “Virgen de las Vírgenes” satirized girls who claimed to be virgins but were not, while "¡Ya No!" addressed issues related to machismo in Mexican society.

Following the album's release, Trevi promoted it extensively through radio, television, and print media. She also toured internationally, performing in countries including the United States, Puerto Rico, Argentina, Colombia, Guatemala, Venezuela, and Costa Rica. The album achieved commercial success, earning Gold and Platinum certifications for high sales. In Mexico, it sold approximately 2,800,000 copies, ranking it among the ten best-selling albums of all time in the country.

== Track listing ==
No.	Title	Writer(s)	Length
1.	"Pelo Suelto"	Mary Morin	3:29
2.	"Virgen de las Vírgenes"	Gloria Treviño	3:29
3.	"Tu Ángel de la Guarda"	Gloria Treviño	4:00
4.	"Jei! (Escucha)"	Gloria Treviño	2:36
5.	"Ya No!"	Gloria Treviño	3:30
6.	"Jack el Reprobador"	Gloria Treviño	3:12
7.	"Agárrate"	Gloria Treviño	3:01
8.	"Hoy me Iré de Casa"	Gloria Treviño	4:20
9.	"La Pasabas bien Conmigo"	Oscar Mancilla	3:41
10.	"(Como si Fuera) La Primera Vez"	Gloria Treviño	3:54
11.	"Amor Apache"	Gloria Treviño	3:31
12.	"Siempre Yo"	Gloria Treviño	3:31

== Singles ==
- "Pelo suelto"
- "Tu ángel de la guarda"
- "Agárrate"
- "Hoy me iré de casa"

== See also ==
- List of best-selling albums in Mexico
