= El Recuento de los Daños =

"El Recuento De Los Daños"

Single by Gloria Trevi

from the album Más Turbada Que Nunca
- Released: June 20, 1994
- Genre: Pop rock
- Length: 3:55
- Label: BMG Mexico; Ariola
- Producer: Sergio Andrade

Gloria Trevi singles chronology
| "A Gatas" (1994) | "El Recuento De Los Daños" (1994) | "Siempre A Mi" (1994) |

"El Recuento de los Daños" ("The Tally of the Damage") is a single from the album Más Turbada Que Nunca by the Mexican singer Gloria Trevi.

The song was released on Mexican radio in 1994. Though the song, like most Gloria Trevi songs of the day, used indirect references, "El Recuento De Los Daños" became well known for its music video aired on public television that broke taboos while bolting out lyrics explaining the depths of violence against women, in a heavily machismo and still traditional Mexico of 1994.

== Music video ==
Though technically a love-related song, it exposed the taboo and hitherto unspoken practice of men punching pregnant women they conceived out of wedlock in order to kill the fetus (del firme impacto de tus manos, "the firm impact of your hands") by purposely eye opening lyrics. The music video shows a girl with blood drenching her swollen abdomen (a miscarriage), as well as a child abduction. The lyrics at the beginning of the chorus also goes Yo no puedo reponerme de ese beso que me subio al cielo, que es el mismo que ahora me hunde en el infierno ("I cannot recover from that kiss that took me to Heaven, the same one which now plunges me to hell").

== Effects ==
Later, Trevi herself was sentenced to jail for conspiring with director Sergio Andrade to sexually abuse women. After her acquittal on lack of evidence and release from jail, Trevi in 2007 sued a Mexican promoter who accused her of murdering her own child she lost while in prison. Fans heavily suspected that she was legally framed and jailed related to her boldness to speak out against social ills.

The song's title was used for an Univision investigative program concerning the scandal.

== Charts ==
The song hit top of the Latin charts in America as well as Mexico.
