= La Trayectoria (Gloria Trevi album) =

Live album by Gloria Trevi
- Released: June 6, 2006
- Recorded: 2005
- Genre: Latin pop
- Label: Univision, Universal Music

Gloria Trevi chronology
Cómo Nace el Universo (2004)	La Trayectoria (2006)	Una Rosa Blu (2007)

La Trayectoria (In English: The Trajectory) is a double live CD and multimedia DVD released by the Mexican singer-songwriter Gloria Trevi in 2006. The DVD includes scenes of the performances at the Palacio de los Deportes of Mexico City and The Arena Monterrey. " Apart from the live recordings, it also includes several songs that were previously unreleased; one of them, "Todos Me Miran" (They All Look At Me), was the first single released from this compilation. It was the first song to become an international success after her not so successful and talked about songs from her previous album Cómo Nace El Universo, which was released by the end of 2004. It is an upbeat and uptempo dance-pop track that besides incorporates elements of disco music. Furthermore, the impact of "Todos Me Miran" and its iconic and widely acclaimed music video resembled the success that she constantly had during the early 90s, before the abrupt hiatus she had because of the sex scandal that involved her and her ex-manager in a series of severe legal accusations for which she had to spend almost five years in prisons in Brazil and Mexico and was later declared absolved. Moreover, "Todos me miran" became a club hit and it is considered an anthem by the LGBT community as well as confirming Trevi as a gay icon. Additionally, it was very successful in the singles charts of most countries in Latin America during 2006 and 2007, reaching the top position in some of them. "Sufran Con Lo Que Yo Gozo", "El Secreto" and "Estrella de La Mañana" were included in this album too. All of these tracks were previously unreleased and were also performed in a number of concerts in order to promote the album. A music video for the song "Sufran Con Lo Que Yo Gozo", which was directed by Gloria Trevi herself, was later released as well. This album has sold over 500,000 copies worldwide as of 2018. It is one of her best-selling albums to date and it also marked her comeback to the mainstream. Although this album's singles received poor promotion on the radio back then, Gloria Trevi promoted this album in numerous TV programs throughout Latin America and the USA, which helped it receive massive attention. Likewise, Trevi performed in multiple concerts and parades in many countries during this period.

== Track listing ==
=== Disc 1 (CD) ===
No.	Title	Length
1.	"Doctor Psiquiatra"
2.	"La Pasabas Bien Conmigo"
3.	"Zapatos Viejos"
4.	"Qué Voy A Hacer Sin Él"
5.	"Si Me Llevas Contigo"
6.	"Me Siento Tan Sola"
7.	"Hoy Me Iré De Casa"
8.	"El Recuento De Los Daños"
9.	"A La Madre"
10.	"Nieve De Mamey"
11.	"Borregos"
12.	"En Medio De La Tempestad"
13.	"Pelo Suelto"
14.	"Papa Sin Catsup"
15.	"Todos Me Miran"
16.	"Sufran Con Lo Que Yo Gozo"
17.	"El Secreto"
18.	"Estrella De La Mañana"
19.	"El Ingrato"

=== Disc 2 (DVD) ===
No.	Title	Length
1.	"Doctor Psiquiatra"
2.	"La Pasabas Bien Conmigo"
3.	"Zapatos Viejos"
4.	"Qué Voy A Hacer Sin Él"
5.	"Si Me Llevas Contigo"
6.	"Me Siento Tan Sola"
7.	"Hoy Me Iré De Casa"
8.	"El Recuento De Los Daños"
9.	"A La Madre"
10.	"Nieve De Mamey"
11.	"Borregos"
12.	"En Medio De La Tempestad"
13.	"Pelo Suelto"
14.	"Papa Sin Catsup"

== Charts ==
Chart (2006)	Peak position
US Top Latin Albums (Billboard)	8
US Latin Pop Albums (Billboard)	14

== Sales and certifications ==
Region	Certification	Certified units/sales
Mexico (AMPROFON)	Gold	50,000^{^}
United States (RIAA)	Gold (Latin)	50,000^{^}
^{^} Shipments figures based on certification alone.
