= Cinco Minutos (song) =

Single by Gloria Trevi

from the album Una Rosa Blu
- Released: March 31, 2008
- Recorded: 2006–2007
- Genre: Pop
- Length: 3:24 (album version); 3:25 (duranguense version/duet w/Los Horóscopos de Durango)
- Label: Univisión
- Songwriters: Erika Ender, Amerika
- Producer: Armando Avila

Gloria Trevi singles chronology
"'Psicofonía'" (2007)	"Cinco Minutos" (2008)	"'Pruébamelo'" (2008)

"Cinco Minutos" (Five Minutes) is a pop song written by singer-songwriters Erika Ender and Amerika Jiménez, and interpreted by the Mexican singer Gloria Trevi. It was produced by Armando Ávila, and is the second single from the artist's seventh studio album Una Rosa Blu (2007).

"Cinco Minutos" was released in March 2008 in Mexico and the United States. It stayed in the popularity lists and top spots of Billboard Magazine and Monitor Latino for 45 consecutive weeks. For this song, co-writer Erika Ender received in 2009 and 2010 the SESAC award in the category 'Song of the Year'. Gloria Trevi received the 2009 Billboard award for "Cinco Minutos" in the female category 'Tema Pop Airplay del Año', and a new nomination in the female category of 2010, 'Artista Regional Mexicano Airplay del Año', for the duranguense remix with Los Horóscopos de Durango.

== Background ==
After the moderate success of her previous single, "Psicofonía", in the charts, "Inmaculada" was announced as the second single of the album, in support of a campaign against the Female homicides in Ciudad Juárez. Despite what was said through the talk show La Oreja in November 2007, this decision was modified a few months later and announced on her website, naming Cinco Minutos and El Favor de la Soledad as the following singles: the first in Mexico and the latter in the United States.

"Cinco Minutos" received its official debut into mainstream Mexican radio in March 2008, accompanied by the music video, filmed in Tenerife, Spain, and as part of the setlist for her 'Una Rosa Blu' concert tour.

To garner a greater airplay in Mexican folk music radio stations, the melody was remixed into Duranguense with the group Los Horóscopos de Durango. Trevi traveled to Miami to meet with the vocalists of the group, Marisol and Vicky Terrazas, with whom the remix was recorded during the night of April 17, 2008. The remix was a commercial success both in radio play, and digital versions.

== Promotion and critical reception ==
=== Mexico ===
"Cinco Minutos" started to grow slowly in Mexican radio stations in January 2008. Its diffusion peaked in April and May of the same year, during which time it reached peak positions in the national charts.

Only days after its release, the radio stations Oye! 89.7 FM, Génesis 98.1 FM, and Tú 103.7 FM, placed the song in the number one position, and thanks to national audience programs Noche de Estrellas and Hoy (both belonging to Televisa), the public demand increased, placing the song in the top 20. Trevi´s participation in the massive event Los 40 Principales México, where she performed the single before over 100,000 expectators in the Estadio Azteca, placed Cinco Minutos in the third spot of the popular radio countdown.

The entertainment magazine Monitor Latino registered its best position in second place both in the general Top 20 list as well as the Top 20 Pop. Also, the monitoring system Nielsen SoundScan placed Trevi at number 4 in the list Pop en Español. The song also reached peak positions in various Latin American cities, while the music video was one of the most requested in music channels internationally.

=== United States ===
The single was released simultaneously in 60 percent of all Latin radio stations of the United States, surpassing the debuts of Luis Miguel and Thalía, after a week of being released in American Radio.

Radio & Records, a predecessor of Billboard Magazine, placed the song in number one of the most played Latin songs in the country. Not only did the song profile itself as the biggest debut, it also turned into the song with the highest audience increase, rotation, and digital downloads. The almost instant entrance represented her best debut and most popular song since Todos Me Miran, which in July 2006 peaked at number 21 in the Top 40 Spanish AC/Pop Chart.

The song debuted on Billboard's Latin Pop Airplay in July 2008 in the 40th spot on its first week. It was the first time it appeared in the charts under Universal Latino. It advanced 7 positions on its fourth week, reaching No. 15. After a month in the charts, it peaked at No. 4.

At the same time, during the second-to-last week of 2008, it reached the top 5 of Billboard's Hot Latin Tracks, as well as the Top 10 of the Latin Hits in Mexico. The duranguense remix managed to stay within the Top 20 of Billboard's Latin Regional Mexican Airplay Chart.

== Music video ==
After her participation in the Drag Queen's Gala of the Carnival of Las Palmas on February 1, 2008, Gloria Trevi and her team took advantage of their stay in Tenerife, Spain, to film the second music video for Una Rosa Blu.

The filming was done in the south side of the island during a long work day; different locations were used, such as the island's seaport and the skirts of Mount Teide, hidden at over 2,000 ft above sea level. Wearing a space suit, the singer finalized the last scenes in below freezing-point temperatures, volcanic lava, and the desert top of the volcano.

Ritmoson Latino released the music video on March 31, 2008, in a half-hour special episode, alongside an interview and a behind-the-scenes.

== Official versions ==
- Cinco Minutos (Original Version) – 3:24 (Ender/Amerika)
- Cinco Minutos (Duranguense Remix) with Los Horóscopos de Durango – 3:25 (Ender/Amerika)
- Cinco Minutos (Manny López Minuteslicious Club Mix) – 6:34 (Ender/Amerika)
- Cinco Minutos (Manny López Minuteslicious Radio Mix) – 4:02 (Ender/Amerika)
- Cinco minutos (Obeic Tic Tac Club Mix) (Ender/Amerika)
- Cinco minutos (Nemesis feat. Manny López Dance Hall Mix) (Ender/Amerika)
- Cinco minutos (Zicky feat. Manny López Duranguense Mix) (Ender/Amerika)

== Charts ==
=== Weekly charts ===
Chart (2008–2009)	Peak position
US Hot Latin Songs (Billboard)	4
US Latin Pop Airplay (Billboard)	4

=== Year-end charts ===
Chart (2008)	Position
US Hot Latin Songs (Billboard)	35
Chart (2009)	Position
US Hot Latin Songs (Billboard)	18

=== Decade-end charts ===
2000s decade-end chart performance for "Cinco Minutos"
Chart (2000–2009)	Position
US Hot Latin Songs (Billboard)	53
