= Una Rosa Blu =

Studio album by Gloria Trevi
- Released: October 2, 2007
- Recorded: 2006–2007
- Genre: Latin pop
- Label: Univision Records, Universal Music
- Producer: Sergio George, Bob Benozzo, Armando Avila

Gloria Trevi chronology
La Trayectoria (2006)	Una Rosa Blu (2007)	Gloria (2011)

Singles from Una Rosa Blu
- 1. "Psicofonía" Released: August 2007; 2. "Cinco Minutos" Released: March 2008; 3. "Pruébamelo" Released: July 2008; 4. "El favor de la soledad" Released: January 2009; 5. "Lo que una chica por amor es capaz" Released: May 2009; 6. "Inmaculada" Released: October 2009

Deluxe Edition
- Una Rosa Blu (Deluxe Edition)

Una Rosa Blu (A Blu(e) Rose) is the seventh studio album by Mexican pop singer-songwriter Gloria Trevi, released by Univision Records on October 2, 2007 (see 2007 in music) in Latin America and the United States. It was produced by Sergio George, Bob Benozzo and Armando Avila. This album sold over 2,000,000 copies. In the US, the album sold about 50,000 copies during the first day of release and later received gold and platinum certifications by the RIAA (Recording Industry Association of America). In Mexico, it received Gold and Platinum certifications and reached fifth place in nationwide sales. Una Rosa Blu reached its highest position of number 3 on the Billboard Latin Pop Albums, within a few weeks of its release. In Spain it was one of the Top 100 best selling albums in 2009. Promotion of Una Rosa Blu was accompanied by five simple: Psicofonia, Cinco Minutos, Pruebamelo, El Favor De La Soledad and Lo Que Una Chica Por Amor Es Capaz which were published between 2007 and 2009. These singles reached the top five radio stations in popularity in Mexico and Latin America. Renowned producer Sergio George was nominated for a Latin Grammy Award in 2009 in the category "Producer of the Year" for his work on La Vida Se Va, track number 7 on Una Rosa Blu, and his other productions with various artists. Armando Avila, who produced most of the songs on the album, was recognized as "Producer of the Year" at the Billboard Latin Music Awards in April 2010.

== Track listing ==
No.	Title	Length
1.	"Psicofonía"	03:43
2.	"Pruébamelo"	03:16
3.	"Lo Que Una Chica Por Amor Es Capaz"	03:42
4.	"Una Rosa Azul (Una Rosa Blu)"	04:09
5.	"Immaculada"	03:12
6.	"Doña Pudor"	03:08
7.	"La Vida Se Va"	03:25
8.	"El Favor De La Soledad"	03:53
9.	"La Calle De La Amargura"	03:39
10.	"Cinco Minutos"	03:25
11.	"Lo Que Te Toca (Featuring Olga Tañón)"	03:54
12.	"Psicofonía (Remix)"	05:39
13.	"Cinco Minutos (Duranguense Version) (Featuring Los Horóscopos de Durango)"	03:26
Total length:		46:41

== Singles ==
#	Title	Date
1.	"Psicofonía"	August 5, 2007
2.	"Cinco Minutos"	March 31, 2008
3.	"Pruébamelo"	2008
4.	"El Favor de la Soledad"	February 2009
5.	"Lo Que Una Chica Por Amor es Capaz"	2009

== Charts ==
Country	Chart	Peak
Colombia	Colombia ASINCOL	1
Mexico	Amprofon Álbum Charts	5
Argentina	CAPIF Top Álbums	8
Italia	IFPI Italian Álbums	52
Spain	Promusicae Top 100	91
Russia	Tophit Russian Álbums 200	142
United States	Billboard 200	169
United States	Billboard Top Álbums Sales	169
United States	Billboard Latin Pop Álbums	3
United States	Billboard Top Latin Álbums	9

== Sales and certifications ==
Region	Certification	Certified units/sales
Argentina (CAPIF)	Gold	20,000^{^}
Colombia (ASINCOL)	Gold	5,000
Mexico (AMPROFON)	Platinum	100,000^{^}
United States (RIAA)	Gold (Latin)	50,000^{^}
^{^} Shipments figures based on certification alone.
