= Me Siento Tan Sola =

Me siento tan sola

Studio album by Gloria Trevi
- Released: July 23, 1992
- Recorded: 1992
- Genre: Pop rock
- Label: BMG Ariola
- Producer: Sergio Andrade

Gloria Trevi chronology
Tu Ángel de la Guarda (1991)	Me siento tan sola (1992)	Más Turbada Que Nunca (1994)

Me siento tan sola (Spanish for "I feel so lonely") is the third album by Mexican singer Gloria Trevi, originally released on July 23, 1992, by BMG Ariola. A limited edition titled I Feel So Alone was released a month later at a convention held by her record company, where it was awarded a Double Gold Record for its high sales. Trevi promoted the album in several countries, including Argentina, Chile, the United States, Venezuela, Colombia, Puerto Rico, and Central America. The album was particularly popular in Japan, where it sold approximately 100,000 copies. In 1992, Trevi traveled to Spain for the first time, where the album was certified Gold. She also managed to captivate Spanish audiences with her unique performances.

In 1993, Trevi was named Queen of the Song Festival of Viña del Mar by the Chilean press, performing before 20,000 spectators. She also performed with great success at the Paramount Theatre in Madison Square Garden in New York. Additionally, she held successful concerts in Washington, California, El Paso, Dallas, and various other U.S. cities, becoming the Mexican pop-rock musician to have performed the most concerts in the United States. That year marked one of the longest concert tours of her career, with performances at venues such as the Universal Studios Amphitheatre in Atlanta, Georgia; San Antonio, Texas; Sacramento, California; Chicago, Illinois; and, for the first time, at the Riviera Hotel in Las Vegas, Nevada. In September, Trevi was confirmed as the most important Mexican pop-rock singer of the time and was dubbed the "Mexican Madonna" by the New York Newspaper and The Wall Street Journal.

The album, produced by Sergio Andrade, Trevi's manager, featured songs primarily written by Trevi herself and major session musicians performed in the album, Vinnie Colaiuta on drums and Jimmy Johnson on bass guitar. It topped several Latin American charts and peaked at number eight on the Latin Pop Albums chart in the United States.

== Track listing ==
No.	Title	Length
1.	"Zapatos Viejos"	03:20
2.	"Con Los Ojos Cerrados"	03:35
3.	"Acostada A Media Calle"	02:20
4.	"Me Siento Tan Sola"	04:06
5.	"Fue Ese Tequila"	02:59
6.	"Los Borregos"	03:47
7.	"La Acera De Enfrente"	03:04
8.	"Contononeia (Se Me Mueve La Cadera)"	02:32
9.	"Muévete"	02:48
10.	"Sobredosis"	03:17
11.	"Carcajada"	02:51
12.	"Hoy No Voy A Gritar"	03:47
Total length:		38:34

== Singles ==
1. "Zapatos Viejos" (No. 1 Mexico)
2. "Con Los Ojos Cerrados" (No. 1 Mexico)
3. "Me Siento Tan Sola" (No. 10 Mexico)
4. "Los Borregos" (No. 3 Mexico)
5. "La Acera De Enfrente" (No. 2 Mexico)
