= Más Turbada Que Nunca =

Mas turbada que nunca

Studio album by Gloria Trevi
- Released: February 1, 1994 (Mexico)
- Recorded: 1993
- Genre: Pop rock, alternative pop
- Label: Sony International
- Producer: Sergio Andrade

Gloria Trevi chronology
Me Siento Tan Sola (1992)	Mas turbada que nunca (1994)	Si Me Llevas Contigo (1995)

Más Turbada Que Nunca (the literal translation is More Disturbed Than Ever, but it's actually a humorous pun on Masturbated than Ever) is the fourth studio album released by pop/rock singer Gloria Trevi in 1994. It was produced by Gloria Trevi and Sergio Andrade.

The album featured 12 tracks with beats ranging from rock such as A Gatas (on all fours), El Juicio (The trial), La Renta (The rent), and rock ballads such as Chica Embarazada (pregnant girl), Por Ti (For you), Siempre A Mi (always to me), funk songs and ballads of love such as El Recuentro De Los Daños (The count of the damage) and Un Dia Mas De Vida (another day of life). The theme of the album reflects the daily experiences with Mexican slang, while exploring different rock-oriented sounds. Besides being a successful album in Mexico, it was also very popular in countries such as Peru, Guatemala and Ecuador while experimenting moderate success in the USA's latin music market. Similar to her two previous albums, Más Turbada Que Nunca experimented an instant success in sales, radio, and television after its release.

== Track listing ==
No.	Title	Writer(s)	Length
1.	"A gatas"	Mary Morin, Armando Arcos	03:38
2.	"La papa sin catsup"	Cesar Lazcano	03:33
3.	"Chica embarazada"	Mary Morin, Armando Arcos	02:33
4.	"Qué bueno que no fui Lady Di!"	Gloria Trevi	03:56
5.	"A la madre"	Mary Morin, Armando Arcos	03:06
6.	"El juicio"	Gloria Trevi	03:37
7.	"La renta"	Gustavo Velazquez	03:18
8.	"Un día más de vida"	Gloria Trevi	03:27
9.	"El recuento de los daños"	Gloria Trevi	03:55
10.	"La boca con jabón"	Mary Morin, Armando Arcos	02:42
11.	"Por ti"	Mary Morin, Armando Arcos	04:02
12.	"Siempre A Mí"	Gloria Trevi	03:12
Total length:			41:59

== Sales ==
Region	Certification	Certified units/sales
Mexico	—	280,000

== Singles ==
1. Papa sin Catsup
2. El Recuento de los Daños
3. Qué Bueno Que no Fui Lady Di
4. Siempre a Mí
