= Las Perdidas =

Mexican transgender content creator collective

- Founded: 2017
- Location: León, Guanajuato, Mexico
- Key people: Wendy Guevara; Paola Suárez; Kimberly Irene; Karina Torres

Las Perdidas (Spanish for The Lost Ones) is a Mexican transgender content creator collective from León, Guanajuato. The group was formed by Wendy Guevara and Paola Suárez after a comedic video they improvised on a hillside in early 2017 went viral across Latin America. Kimberly Irene joined as a third core member shortly afterward; Karina Torres was later incorporated into the group. Following their emergence on social media, Las Perdidas have expanded into television acting, music, live performance, and business. The group has been covered as a collective across English- and Spanish-language media and has been the subject of peer-reviewed academic scholarship on transgender representation and queer digital media in Mexico.

== Background ==
=== Founding viral video (2017) ===
All core members of Las Perdidas grew up in the working-class barrio of El Coecillo in León de Los Aldama, Guanajuato, a city in central Mexico.

In early 2017, Wendy Guevara and Paola Suárez were on an outing on a hillside near León when their companions left in search of drinks and did not return. Guevara and Suárez improvised a comedic video on a mobile phone in which they repeatedly exclaimed "¡Estamos perdidas, perdidas, PERDIDAS!" ("We're lost, lost, LOST!"). A friend of Suárez's posted the video to the internet, where it went viral within weeks, accumulating millions of views across Mexico.

Guevara and Suárez were subsequently invited to the MTV MIAW Awards ceremony in June 2017 in Mexico City, where they received the "Lords y Ladies" award.

Because Suárez was residing in Mexico City at the time and could not collaborate in León regularly, Guevara began producing YouTube content with their mutual friend Kimberly Irene, who became recognized as a third member of the group. The three formalized Las Perdidas as a content collective centered on YouTube.

== Members ==
=== Wendy Guevara ===
Wendy Guevara Venegas (born 12 August 1993 in León, Guanajuato) is a content creator, actress, singer, and businesswoman. Co-creator of the 2017 founding viral video, she is the group's most prominent public figure and has individually pursued careers in music, television acting, and entrepreneurship.

=== Paola Suárez ===
Paola Suárez (born 21 March 1992 in León, Guanajuato), also known as Paolita Suárez, is a content creator, YouTuber, singer, and entrepreneur. She co-created the original 2017 viral video. In 2021, she launched an independent footwear line for extended sizes. In January 2024, she was hospitalized following a violent assault by her then-fiancé, with national outlets including El Universal reporting the severity of her injuries. In 2025, she hosted Perdida en Tokio, a seven-episode solo travel and comedy series filmed in Tokyo. In November 2026, she joined the cast of the second season of the reality competition La Mansión VIP.

=== Kimberly Irene ===
Kimberly Irene (born 2 December 1990 in León, Guanajuato), known by the nickname La Más Preciosa (The Most Precious), is a content creator, singer, and actress. Although not present in the original 2017 viral video, she joined the group shortly afterward and appeared regularly in the collective's YouTube content. In 2021, she suffered life-threatening complications following elective cosmetic surgery, including thrombosis and a coma. In 2022, she won the MTV MIAW Award for MIAWudio of the Year, recognizing a viral TikTok audio clip in which she mispronounced muy peligroso (very dangerous) as muy pegriloso. By 2024, she had publicly distanced herself from the collective.

=== Karina Torres ===
Karina Torres (born Edna Karina Torres Hernández; 4 August 1990 in León, Guanajuato) is a content creator, comedian, and professional stylist. She is publicly known by the nickname La Licenciada (The Graduate), which her community gave her after photographs and videos of her graduation ceremony from the Academia de Belleza y Cosmetología de León went viral. She later joined the expanded "Clan de Las Perdidas" and is credited with popularizing nadaqueveriento/a, a colloquial Mexican Spanish adjective meaning "out of place, inappropriate, or irrelevant," which the Academia Mexicana de la Lengua formally analyzed and recognized as a neologism in February 2025.

== Career ==
Las Perdidas have collectively pursued careers in television acting, live performance, music, and brand partnerships, while individual members have simultaneously developed independent projects. Their collective activities include a national live tour, a debut group single, and recurring appearances as a unit on television programs and at major events.

=== Early career (2017–2022) ===
In 2019, Guevara and Suárez made their first television appearance as special guest stars in the Televisa telenovela Doña Flor y sus dos maridos.

In 2022, Las Perdidas partnered with Mexican journalist Adela Micha on her digital platform La Saga to produce Ni tan perdidas (Not So Lost), an LGBT-focused interview and entertainment series broadcast on YouTube. Micha credited the group with a natural ability to connect with audiences.

=== Television, reality competition, and live tour (2023) ===
In 2023, Guevara, Suárez, and Kimberly Irene appeared together in Gloria Trevi: Ellas soy yo, an authorized biographical television series about singer Gloria Trevi produced by Carla Estrada for TelevisaUnivision. The series premiered on Vix on 11 August 2023 before airing on Las Estrellas. The three members portrayed sex workers who shelter a young Gloria Trevi early in her life. Suárez and Kimberly Irene also appeared as guests in the Televisa comedy series El príncipe del barrio the same year.

Also in 2023, Wendy Guevara competed in the first season of La casa de los famosos México, broadcast by TelevisaUnivision across Las Estrellas, Canal 5, and Vix. After 71 days in the house, she won with 18.2 million of the competition's 40 million total votes cast.

Following Guevara's win, Las Perdidas launched the "Resulta y Resalta" national live tour in September 2023, performing together across 34 shows in 29 cities throughout Mexico. The tour opened on 14 September at the Teatro Metropólitan in Mexico City and ran through October, with Guevara, Suárez, and Kimberly Irene appearing on stage together across venues including Guadalajara, Monterrey, Puebla, Tijuana, and Zacatecas.

Vix also commissioned Wendy, perdida pero famosa (Wendy, Lost but Famous), a solo reality series following Guevara's daily life, which premiered on 5 October 2023. The show received a GLAAD Special Recognition Award at the 35th Annual GLAAD Media Awards in 2024.

=== 2024 ===
In April 2024, Guevara joined Madonna onstage as a special guest during the "Vogue" number of Madonna's Celebration Tour at her concert in Mexico City, prompting widespread coverage in Mexican and international LGBTQ+ media. That same month, Suárez ran as a candidate for the Guanajuato state legislature under the Partido del Trabajo, seeking the Distrito VII seat in her home city of León. She received 2.21% of the vote in the 2 June 2024 election, losing to the Partido Acción Nacional candidate.

In July 2024, Guevara starred alongside actor Julián Gil in Un Amor VieJJOO en París, a 25-episode miniseries produced by TelevisaUnivision as part of its coverage of the 2024 Summer Olympics, broadcast on Canal 5 and Las Estrellas.

Later that year, Rolling Stone named Guevara number 25 on its global list of the 25 most influential social media creators of 2024, tracing her prominence to the "las perdidas" viral video and describing her as "the most sought-after internet celebrity in Latin America."

=== 2025–2026 ===
In early 2025, the group collectively released their debut single "Perdidas Empoderadas," accompanied by a music video addressing the experiences of transgender women in Mexico. Also in February 2025, Torres received national media attention when the Academia Mexicana de la Lengua formally recognized nadaqueveriento, a term she had popularized, as a neologism in Mexican Spanish. Later in 2025, Paola Suárez hosted Perdida en Tokio, a seven-episode travel and comedy series filmed in Tokyo and broadcast on the YouTube channel México al Minuto.

In June 2025, Torres appeared in an official promotional video for Netflix Latin America ahead of the premiere of the third season of Squid Game on 27 June. The campaign drew on a viral social media trend in which users had compared Torres to the series' masked antagonist; in the video, she portrayed the character before revealing herself in her characteristic comedic style.

In July 2025, Torres served as the guest presenter of "La Fiesta de los Famosos," the official premiere event for the third season of La casa de los famosos México, broadcast live across the show's social media platforms ahead of the season launch on Las Estrellas. Guevara also served as a co-host for the season's pre- and post-gala broadcasts.

Also in October 2025, Guevara appeared as herself in a guest role in the premiere episode of Papás por siempre, a Televisa telenovela produced by Rosy Ocampo that aired on Las Estrellas from 13 October 2025 to 1 February 2026.

In October 2025, Guevara, Suárez, and Torres served as hosts of the official Wicked: For Good Halloween event in Mexico City, organized by Universal Pictures Mexico. In promotional material for the event, actors Ariana Grande and Cynthia Erivo—playing Glinda and Elphaba—directly recreated the "estamos perdidas" phrase from the group's 2017 viral video, generating widespread attention in Latin American and international media.

In February 2026, Paola Suárez appeared in a branded promotional crossover titled Como agua para hervir tomates, produced in conjunction with the second-season premiere of the Max series Como agua para chocolate (Like Water for Chocolate), based on the novel by Laura Esquivel. The title referenced a viral clip in which Suárez had argued that tomatoes did not need washing before being boiled. The short-form video was distributed through Max Latin America's official social media channels.

In April 2026, old videos from the group's early career years resurfaced on social media and generated widespread criticism. Guevara issued a public apology, acknowledging that the content did not reflect her current views and attributing it to inexperience at the outset of their careers. Suárez initially disputed the characterization of the videos before declining to comment further.

In May 2026, Suárez was involved in a traffic accident in León, Guanajuato, in which her vehicle struck a delivery truck. She stated publicly that she was not intoxicated at the time, explaining that her vehicle veered into a truck as she rounded a corner while returning from getting food, and confirmed she had been seen by doctors and was out of danger, though her vehicle was severely damaged. Guevara publicly expressed support for Suárez following the incident.

In July 2026, Torres was confirmed as a participant in La casa de los famosos México season 4, which premiered later that month on Las Estrellas and ViX. Guevara also joined the season as co-presenter of the pre- and post-gala broadcasts. In October 2026, Torres finished third in the season finale, behind winner Mariana Ochoa and runner-up Memo Schutz. The result drew criticism on social media, and Suárez publicly disputed it.

In November 2026, Suárez was confirmed as the sixth participant in the second season of La Mansión VIP, a reality competition produced by the influencer Roberto González, known as HotSpanish, with a prize of 2 million pesos. The season premiered on 8 November 2026 with 16 participants.

=== Music ===
Members of Las Perdidas have pursued individual and collective music careers. Guevara began releasing EDM and Latin pop singles in 2021. The group released their debut collective single, "Perdidas Empoderadas," in early 2025.

=== Business ventures ===
In 2021, Las Perdidas applied to register their name as a trademark with Mexico's Instituto Mexicano de la Propiedad Industrial (IMPI). The registration was granted on 20 April 2022 under Class 41, covering entertainment services including live performances, comedy, and event hosting, and is valid until 2032.

The members of Las Perdidas have opened several shared businesses in their home neighborhood. In 2021, they opened a food and beverages stall in the El Coecillo neighborhood of León. The members perform regularly at nightclubs and music venues throughout Mexico and in other Latin American countries, and have modeled for Mexican fashion designer Karloz Zermeño.

== Cultural impact and reception ==
Las Perdidas has received coverage as a collective across English-language LGBTQ+ media, Spanish-language national press, and peer-reviewed academic scholarship. Rolling Stone described the group as having "built an intense social media presence, often livestreaming their shenanigans," whose popularity rested on a candid presentation of everyday life that set their content apart from more polished influencer formats.

Las Perdidas rose to prominence in Mexico at a time when transgender women faced disproportionately high rates of violence in the country. According to the Trans Murder Monitoring Project, Mexico has consistently recorded among the highest numbers of transgender homicides in Latin America. The assault on Paola Suárez in January 2024, which left her hospitalized with facial injuries and broken ribs, was reported by national outlets including El Universal and Infobae, and prompted renewed media discussion of this context.

Member Wendy Guevara's 2023 win on La casa de los famosos México attracted significant coverage in English-language media and was widely framed as a milestone for the group's broader cultural impact. Rolling Stone noted that when the result was announced, crowds gathered around Mexico City's Angel of Independence monument, and described the victory as representing "a monumental shift in the portrayal of the queer community, and specifically trans people, in Latine media." GLAAD published a detailed analysis of the win, citing Mexican legislators, researchers in trans healthcare, and human rights advocates who described Guevara's visibility as a landmark moment for the trans community in Mexico. The Advocate profiled Guevara in October 2023, contextualizing her fame within Las Perdidas' origins.

A 2024 open-access peer-reviewed article published in Online Media and Global Communication (De Gruyter Mouton) used Las Perdidas as a primary case study in an analysis of queer digital celebrity in Mexico. The paper traced the group's rise within what it described as a "highly transphobic context," arguing that even content that is not explicitly political works to "reconfigure dominant gender narratives" by opening space for non-hegemonic trans identities to become visible on mainstream platforms. The paper identified a tension in assessments of the group among Mexican LGBTQ+ activists: some critics argued that the group's mainstream popularity came at the cost of broader political representation, while others rejected the premise that visibility requires an activist mandate. It also observed that Las Perdidas never distanced themselves from the working-class community where they grew up, and that this grounding gave their success a particular resonance, with pride functioning in their content as "dignity, collective joy and hope" accessible to a broad audience.

== Filmography ==
Year	Title	Network / Platform	Members	Notes
2019	Doña Flor y sus dos maridos	Televisa	Guevara, Suárez	Special guest appearance
2023	Gloria Trevi: Ellas soy yo	TelevisaUnivision / Vix	Guevara, Suárez, Kimberly Irene	Supporting roles
2023	El príncipe del barrio	Televisa	Suárez, Kimberly Irene	Guest appearance
2023–present	Wendy, perdida pero famosa	Vix	Guevara	Solo reality series; group appears in cameo roles
2024	Un Amor VieJJOO en París	TelevisaUnivision / Canal 5 / Las Estrellas	Guevara	Lead role; 25-episode miniseries tied to Paris Olympics coverage
2025	Papás por siempre	Televisa / Las Estrellas	Guevara	Guest appearance (as herself)

== Discography ==
=== Collective ===
Year	Title	Notes
2025	"Perdidas Empoderadas"	Debut collective single

=== Selected solo singles ===
Year	Artist	Title
2021–present	Wendy Guevara	Multiple EDM and Latin pop singles
2022	Paola Suárez	"Dos, tres trucos"
2023	Kimberly Irene	"La página"

== Awards and nominations ==
Year	Award	Category	Recipient	Result
2017	MTV MIAW Awards	Lords y Ladies	Wendy Guevara and Paola Suárez	Won
2022	MTV MIAW Awards	MIAWudio of the Year	Kimberly Irene	Won
2024	35th Annual GLAAD Media Awards	Special Recognition Award	Wendy, perdida pero famosa (ViX)	Won
2024	Rolling Stone	25 Most Influential Creators of 2024 (ranked #25)	Wendy Guevara	Won

== See also ==
- Wendy Guevara
- La casa de los famosos México
- LGBTQ rights in Mexico
