= Habla Blah Blah =

Single by Gloria Trevi

from the album De Película
- Released: August 1, 2014
- Genre: Latin pop
- Length: 3:50
- Label: Universal Music Latino
- Songwriters: Gloria Trevi; Paulino; Samuel Parra

Gloria Trevi singles chronology
"No Me Ames" (2014)	"Habla Blah Blah" (2014)

"Habla Blah Blah" ("Talk Blah Blah") is a song by Mexican recording artist Gloria Trevi, it was released by Universal Music Latino as the fifth single from her ninth studio album De Película (2013) on August 1, 2014.

== Charts ==
Chart (2014)	Peak position
Colombia (National-Report)	13
Mexico (Billboard Mexican Airplay)	27
US Latin Pop Airplay (Billboard)	17
Venezuela (National-Report)	1

== Certification ==
Country	Certification	Sold
AVIMPRO VENEZUELA	Platinum	15.000
