= Wendy Guevara =

Mexican influencer (born 1993)

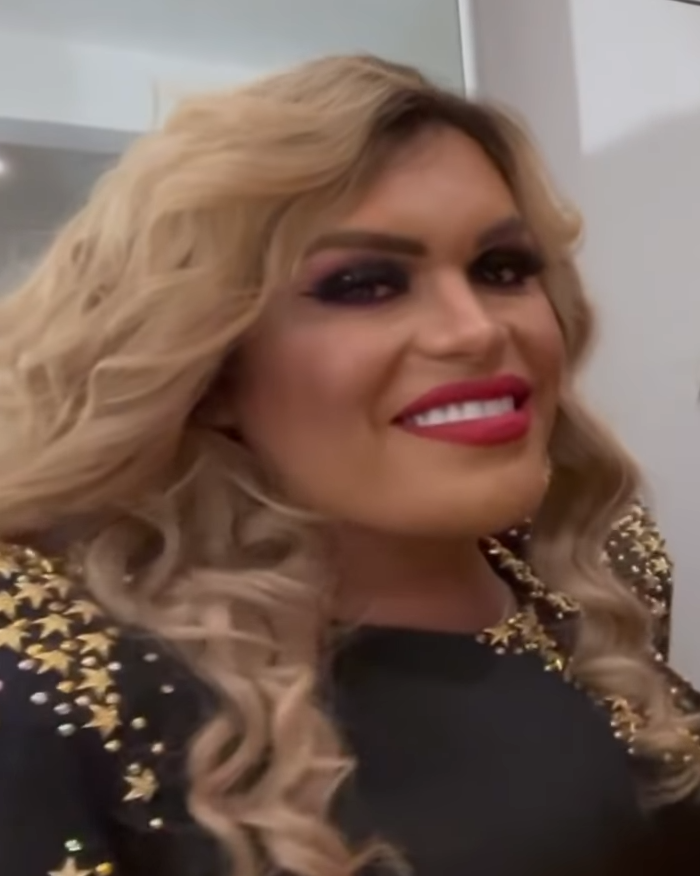
- Guevara in 2021
- Born: 12 August 1993 (age 33); León, Guanajuato, Mexico
- Years active: 2017–present
- Musical career
- Genres: Latin pop, EDM
- Instrument: Vocals

Wendy Guevara Venegas (born 12 August 1993) is a Mexican trans woman influencer, actress, singer and businesswoman. She rose to fame in 2017, after a viral video along with her friend Paola Suárez. Later, they both created the YouTube channel and art group Las Perdidas, together with Kimberly Irene.

Since 2021, Guevara also has a solo career. She has released multiple promotional singles and has collaborated musically with other artists. Guevara has worked as TV host, primarily online. In 2023, she participated in La casa de los famosos México, broadcast by TelevisaUnivision; after her victory, she marked history by becoming the first trans woman to win a reality show in Mexico and Latin America.

== Early life ==
Wendy Guevara Venegas was born in León, Guanajuato, on 12 August 1993. She is one of the four children of Francisco Guevara Jaramillo and Fabiola Venegas Vázquez (or Vázquez Venegas). She lived a difficult childhood, due to her father's alcoholism problems, and had to conceal her sexual orientation and gender identity. Her family is in the shoe manufacturing business, and Guevara worked for a long time in the family business. She was harassed at school because of her gender identity and only completed her primary education.

When she was seven years old, she was sexually abused; at the age of eight, a truck ran over her. Growing up, Guevara watched other trans women on television. She has cited Mexican trans actress Alejandra Bogue as one of her main media references.

Guevara began to adopt female attire with the support of her friend Lucero, a trans woman who owned a beauty salon near the Jardín San Juan del Coecillo neighborhood, where Wendy grew up. Lucero allowed Wendy and other young trans women to dress as women in her home. In her early days, Wendy used the name Vianney when cross-dressing. Lucero baptized Guevara as "Wendy" after the character Wendy Nayeli Pérez from the telenovela Amigas y rivales (2001), played by Angélica Vale. When she was 19, she worked as a sex worker in Mexico City for a time.

== Career ==
=== 2017–2022: Las Perdidas and music career ===
In September 2017, Guevara and Paola Suárez, her friend, went to a hill near León de los Aldama. Her companions had been gone for several hours looking for something to drink. Both decided to record a video where they joked about their situation by pretending they had been abandoned in an unknown location and uttered the phrase, ¡Estamos perdidas! ('We're lost!'). Suárez shared the video via Facebook and weeks later it became viral. The video earned them an award at the 2017 MTV Millennial Awards.

When they became more well-known, Guevara and Suárez, along with Kimberly Irene, created the art group Las Perdidas, which broadcast via YouTube. In 2019, Guevara and Suárez made their television debut as guests of the telenovela Doña Flor y sus dos maridos (2019), broadcast by Televisa.

In 2021, Guevara began her musical career, releasing multiple EDM and Latin pop promotional singles. In 2022, Las Perdidas collaborated with journalist Adela Micha in the virtual platform La Saga, starring in Ni tan perdidas.

=== 2023–present: La casa de los famosos ===
Las Perdidas participated in the biopic TV series Gloria Trevi: Ellas soy yo (2023), produced by Carla Estrada for Televisa and based on the life and career of Gloria Trevi.

In February 2023, Guevara released "TAPU". In June 2023, she was selected to participate in the Big Brother spinoff reality show, La casa de los famosos México, broadcast by TelevisaUnivision: Las Estrellas, Canal 5 and Vix. After 71 days of competition, Guevara won the show and became the first trans woman to win in a Mexican or Latin America reality show, receiving 18.2 million votes.

Vix announced she would host her on TV show, Wendy, perdida pero famosa.

== Discography ==
- "Hasta que salga el sol"
- "Hey perra"
- "Putssy" (Trixy Star with Wendy Guevara)
- "Tapu"
- "Tu malandrito" (Pol Prince feat. Wendy Guevara)
- "Bad Boy"
- "Mua"

== Filmography ==
Television
Year	Title	Role	Note	Ref.
2019	Doña Flor y sus dos maridos	Herself	Special guest, together with Paola Suárez	
2023	La casa de los famosos México	Herself	Winner	
2023	Gloria Trevi: Ellas soy yo	Sex worker	2 episodes; together with Las Perdidas	
2023	Wendy, perdida pero famosa	Herself	13 episodes	
2023	¿Quién es la máscara?	Herself	Guest panelist, season 5 episode: "Wendy, perdida o investigadora"	
2024	La casa de los famosos Colombia	Herself	Special houseguest	
2025	Desiguales	Herself	Host	

== Awards and nominations ==
Year	Award	Recipient	Category	Result	Ref.
2017	MTV Millennial Awards	Las Perdidas	Lords & Ladies del Año	Won	
2021	MTV Millennial Awards	Las Perdidas	Filósofas del Año	Nominated	
2022	MTV Millennial Awards	Las Perdidas	Miawdio del año	Won	
2023	MTV Millennial Awards	Herself	Ícono MIAW	Won	
2024	Premios Juventud	Herself	Creator del año	Won	
