= De Película (Gloria Trevi album) =

Studio album by Gloria Trevi
- Released: 24 September 2013
- Genre: Electropop; pop rock
- Length: 43:36
- Label: Universal Music
- Producer: Armando Ávila; Sebastian J.; Maurilio Pineda; Motiff

Gloria Trevi chronology
Gloria (2011)	De Película (2013)	El Amor (2015)

Singles from De Película
- 1. "Libre Para Amarte" Released: 17 June 2013; 2. "No Soy un Pájaro" Released: 24 July 2013; 3. "No Querías Lastimarme" Released: 17 September 2013; 4. "No Me Ames" Released: 15 February 2014; 5. "Habla Blah Blah" Released: 1 August 2014

De Película is the ninth studio album by Mexican singer Gloria Trevi. It was released on 24 September 2013 through Universal Music Group. The album produced five singles, two of which were used in Trevi's 2012 telenovela Libre Para Amarte.

== Track listing ==
No.	Title	Writer(s)	Length
1.	"De Película"	Gloria Trevi; Sebastián Jácome	3:24
2.	"Mujer Maravilla"	Trevi; Erika Ender; Amerika Jiménez	3:45
3.	"No Querías Lastimarme"	Trevi; Ángel Gabriel; Marcela de la Garzar	3:44
4.	"Habla Blah Blah"	Paulino; Samo; Trevi	3:50
5.	"Sabes"	Trevi; Marcela de la Garza	3:59
6.	"Aurora"	Trevi	3:54
7.	"Libre Para Amarte"	Trevi; Marcela de la Garza; Maffio	3:27
8.	"Bipolar"	Trevi; Mónica Vélez; Mario Iván	3:17
9.	"¿Por Qué Tan Triste?"	Jorge Villamizar	4:02
10.	"No Soy un Pájaro"	Trevi; Ángel Gabriel; Jácome	3:37
11.	"No Me Ames" (Banda version)	Trevi; Pepe Garza	3:01
12.	"No Soy un Pájaro" (Banda version)	Trevi; Ángel Gabriel; Jácome	3:38

== Charts ==
Position
Country	Provider	Chart	Peak
2013
Mexico	AMPROFON	Top 20 Albums	2
United States	Billboard	Latin Pop Albums	2
United States	Billboard	Top Latin Albums	2
United States	Billboard	Billboard 200	109

== Certifications ==
Certificaciones obtenidas por De Película
País	Country	Certification	Sales	Ref.
Mexico	AMPROFON	Gold	30,000	

== Release ==
- Standard version

Region	Date	Format	Company
Worldwide	24 September 2013	CD, digital download	Universal Music Group
