= Gloria Trevi: Ellas soy yo =

- Genre: Biographical
- Created by: Eric Vonn
- Written by: Lele Portas; Marco Tulio Socorro; Carla Estrada
- Directed by: Carla Estrada
- Starring: Scarlet Gruber
- Composer: Jorge Avendaño
- Country of origin: Mexico
- Original language: Spanish
- No. of seasons: 1
- No. of episodes: 50

Production
- Executive producer: Carla Estrada
- Producers: Arturo Lorea; Guillermo Gutiérrez
- Editors: Omar Arangutia Olvera; Cecilia Fernández; Cristopher Cruz; Gabriela Padilla; Alma Pardo
- Production company: TelevisaUnivision

Original release
- Network: Vix
- Release: 11 August – 13 October 2023

Gloria Trevi: Ellas soy yo is a Mexican biographical television series produced by Carla Estrada for TelevisaUnivision. The series is based on the life of Mexican singer Gloria Trevi. Scarlet Gruber stars as Trevi. It premiered on Vix on 11 August 2023 and ended on 13 October 2023.

== Cast ==
- Scarlet Gruber as Gloria Trevi
  - Regina Villaverde as teen Gloria
  - Lu Rosette as 11-year-old Gloria
  - Valentina Delgado as 6-year-old Gloria
  - Luca Montellano as 4-year-old Gloria
- Jorge Poza as César Santiago Jiménez
- Patsy as Gloria Ruiz Arredondo
  - Felicia Mercado as senior Gloria Ruiz
  - Ingrid Martz as young Gloria Ruiz
- Nicole Vale as Lisbeth Rincón
- Lessy Hernández as Alicia Flores
  - Majo Edgar as teen Alicia
- Norma Herrera as Aurora Tamez de Arredondo
- Gloria Mayo as Doña Gloria
- Sian Chiong as Javier
- Gonzalo Gúzman
- Yurem Rojas as Ricky Luis
- Emilio Laguardia as Ramiro
- Diego Cárdenas as Mario
- Hugo Tadeo as Luis
- Pamela Vargas as Paola
- Ivanna Benítez as Laura
- Paulina Maya as Mariela
- Wendy Guevara
- Kimberly La Más Preciosa
- Paola Suárez
- Isabella Corral
- Montserrat Torres
- Eduardo Capetillo as Armando Gómez
  - Sebastián Fouilloux as young Armando
- Elaine Haro as Nayeli González
- María José Mariscal as Alondra López
- Mime Faisal as Arlene López
- Renata Bondoni as Yutzil Cruz
- Evelyn Álvarez as Gladys
- Luisa Galindo as Liliana Regueiro
- Catalina Castelblanco as Edith Zúñiga
- Milaray Moreno as Tamara Zúñiga
  - Amanda Silva as child Tamara
- Victoria Viera as Heidi Ramírez
- Alberto Casanova as Don Manuel
- Liliana Regueiro as Lourdes
- Tamara Zúñiga as Alma
- Charly Mario as Juan
- Raquel Bigorra as Sara Soto
- Nashla Aguilar as Lucy Trevi
- Michel López as Manuel
  - Daniel Aragón as child Manuel
- Gustavo Mata as himself
- Kunno Olivo as Luciano
- Harry Geithner as Emilio Azcárraga Milmo
- Mara Patricia Castañeda as TV Hostess
- Eduardo Salar as TV Host
- Graciela Mauri as Melina
- Alberto Estrella as Judge from Chihuahua
- René Strickler as Jiménez Cantú
- Roberta Burns as Mercedes Solís
- Abraham Ramos as Lawyer
- Jan as Fernando Galeana
- Lupita Sandoval as La Corcholata
- Laura Luz as Guadalupe Loaeza
- Liz Clapes as Adriana
- Lorena Álvarez as Danna Vázquez
- Hanny Sáenz as Cristina and Ana Candiani
- Lucero Lander as Elisa
- Elena Pérez as Abigail
- Francisco Avendaño as Felipe
- Amaranta Ruiz as Reporter
- Carlos Marmen as Bosco
- Roberto Miquel as Ramón
- Mila Nader as Gaby
- Mateo Vélez Castañon as Quique
- Emiliano García as Lalo
- Bárbara Laguardia as Amalia
  - Eugenia Cárdenas as 7-year-old Amalia
- Nuria Loya as Rita
- Keira as Isabel
- Andrea Pérez as Irena
- Luiza Gimenez as Elba
- Karla Sofía Hernández as Brenda
- Paola Dives as Mildred

=== Guest stars ===
- Lorena de la Garza as Martha Zavaleta
- Andrea Gio as Crystal
- Luisa Díaz
- Roberto Alanís
- Roberto Blandón as Valentín Pimstein
- Juan Carlos Casasola
- Ana Karen Parra as Edna
- Julio César Álvarez as Raúl Velasco
- Lina Radwan as Kati Godoy
- Danna Alcalá as Tina

== Production ==
In May 2022, the series was announced at TelevisaUnivision's upfront for the 2022–2023 television season. Filming of the series began on 7 November 2022 in Mexico City. A few days later, Scarlet Gruber was announced in the lead role of Gloria Trevi in her adult years.

== Release ==
The series premiered first on Vix, TelevisaUnivision's streaming service, on 11 August 2023. The series aired on Las Estrellas from 4 September 2023 to 10 November 2023.

== Episodes ==
No.	Title	Original release date	Las Estrellas air date	Mexico linear viewers (millions)
1	"Una lata de atún"	11 August 2023	4 September 2023	3.1
Alicia accuses Gloria of eating before her scheduled time and suffers the rage of César Santiago. Gloria asks her mother to allow her to live outside the institute and at the same time, she continues to pursue her dream of being a great artist. Years before, Gloria and Javier meet at a party and shortly after, he asks her to be his girlfriend. César Santiago discusses his new musical project with Ricky Luis and he proposes Gloria; remembering her TV presentation, César Santiago asks to meet her.
2	"El encuentro"	11 August 2023	5 September 2023	2.9
César Santiago is confronted by the father of one of his students for having impregnated her. Ricky Luis meets Gloria and immediately takes her to meet César Santiago. César Santiago introduces Gloria to her future classmates provoking Alicia's jealousy. César Santiago convinces Gloria Ruiz to leave her daughter under his command and tutelage.
3	"Una de cal y otra de arena"	11 August 2023	6 September 2023	2.5
Gloria signs an agreement with César Santiago to prevent her from having a boyfriend despite Javier's criticism. Gloria suffers from César Santiago's criticism, her mother argues that he only wants her to reach perfection. Gloria Ruiz realizes that César Santiago is trying to turn off Gloria's shine to give priority to Alicia and claims that her daughter is the best artist in the group. Javier confronts César Santiago for forbidding his students to have boyfriends, he releases them from the agreement, terminating the group.
4	"Tejiendo la trampa"	11 August 2023	7 September 2023	2.7
César Santiago recognizes Gloria's sacrifices to please him, so he takes her out to dinner and takes the opportunity to talk about his past love affair. Gloria's friends recommend her to change her job and dedicate herself to the streets. Alicia asks Gloria to stay away from César Santiago since they are married and shows her the consequences of their relationship.
5	"Espejismo de amor"	11 August 2023	8 September 2023	2.5
Gloria learns of the death of one of her street friends. Gloria manages to get out of the building before its imminent collapse, after the earthquake that shocked Mexico City in 1985. César Santiago confesses his feelings to Gloria, she agrees to be his girlfriend even though he is married to Alicia. Gloria is ready to reveal her love for César Santiago, he slaps her and calls Alicia to prove that there is no friendship between them.
6	"Desilusión"	18 August 2023	11 September 2023	2.7
Gloria decides to stop singing in the streets and resume her music career, but her friends advise her to stay away from César Santiago. César Santiago dissolves Fresitas Salvajes and Gloria fears she will end up on the streets; he offers her a space in his house and she accepts. César Santiago locks Gloria up for talking to another man; hunger and desperation lead her to make an attempt on her life. To prove her loyalty, Gloria gives César Santiago all the money her parents have saved to support her music career.
7	"Un paso atrás"	18 August 2023	12 September 2023	2.9
Gloria assures that César Santiago has had time to think about their relationship and trusts that this time, things will be different. Gloria visits her mother in the company of César Santiago to propose that she pay for the recording of her solo album, and upon hearing the song, she agrees to support her. Gloria discovers that her mother has been having problems with her husband, because lately he has been involved with bad company and she fears for the welfare of her siblings. César Santiago complains to Gloria for wanting to use him to achieve fame and asks her to show her love by giving up her musical career.
8	"Amor incondicional"	18 August 2023	13 September 2023	2.6
César Santiago prepares Gloria to visit several record companies, finally deciding to accept the terms of a company with international reach. Nayeli gets a scholarship to César Santiago's school and manages to befriend Gloria to get as much information as possible about him. Gloria realizes that César Santiago is investing more and more time in Nayeli's education and becomes jealous for fear that she will be replaced as his girlfriend. César Santiago confronts Gloria for meddling in his relationship with Nayeli; Gloria agrees to be punished to regain his trust.
9	"Con la suerte a favor"	18 August 2023	14 September 2023	2.6
Nayeli lists all the reasons why she likes César Santiago and provokes Gloria's jealousy. Gloria can't stand feeling displaced by César Santiago and decides to end her life. A year after signing her contract, Gloria receives the news that her album will be released. César Santiago orders Gloria to start performing in public and she fails, but when her song 'Dr. psiquiatra' is released, it becomes a hit.
10	"Yo soy Gloria Trevi"	18 August 2023	15 September 2023	1.9
The record label takes charge of a makeover for Gloria. Gloria is criticized for her independent thinking and is labeled immoral. Gloria appears on Siempre en Domingo ignoring all recommendations of modesty and to everyone's surprise, she wins Raúl Velasco's admiration for her authenticity. César Santiago warns Gloria that she will not appear on Siempre en Domingo again unless she changes her unkempt appearance, she refuses and he slaps her.
11	"El gran ascenso"	25 August 2023	18 September 2023	2.5
César Santiago demands that Gloria not allow any man to approach her or even speak to her even though he is with Nayeli. Alicia envies the fanaticism of Gloria's followers and makes her feel less so to make sure that fame never goes to her head. Nayeli mocks Gloria and Alicia saying that they both envy her relationship with César Santiago, he overhears her and explains her place in the house. Gloria reads the letter that her grandmother published in a newspaper, where she scorns her for her impudent attitudes during her presentations.
12	"La fábrica de dinero"	25 August 2023	19 September 2023	2.5
Nayeli brags to her mother that César Santiago offered her the opportunity to record her first album. César Santiago asks Gladys for a sample of what she is willing to do for him and abuses her; he then offers his support in exchange for not saying anything. Gloria is questioned about her feelings for César Santiago. Nayeli's mother discovers the relationship between her daughter and César Santiago, so she forbids her to see him.
13	"Bajo el yugo"	25 August 2023	20 September 2023	2.7
César Santiago marries Nayeli and Gloria is forced to attend despite the pain caused by this union. Despite Gloria's warnings, Nayeli shows interest in other men, making clear her fear of ending up like her and her companions. Gloria's friends try to reunite with her, but Alicia manages to stop them, causing a huge commotion. César Santiago proposes to Gloria to make a nude calendar and blackmails her with leaving her if she refuses to do it.
14	"El calendario"	25 August 2023	21 September 2023	2.7
Nayeli can't stops thinking about César Santiago and even decides to recruit other girls for the school in order to make him happy. On her trip to Monterrey, Gloria learns that her great-grandmother Boyita has been diagnosed with leukemia. César Santiago gets Gloria to travel to Monterrey to say goodbye to her great-grandmother, but pressures her to return the next day to fulfill her contract on the film. Days after Aurora's death, Gloria cries inconsolably for not being able to be present at her great-grandmother's last moments.
15	"Zapatos viejos"	25 August 2023	22 September 2023	2.4
César Santiago buys a house and puts it in Gloria's name but warns her that it is not her property and at the moment he decides, he will return it to her. During a live interview, Gloria is criticized for the image she projects to society. Gloria's new album becomes an international hit and César Santiago takes the opportunity to produce a movie with the same name. During her tour in Argentina, Gloria has an incident with a TV host that could get her deported.
16	"Esperanza de amor"	1 September 2023	25 September 2023	2.6
While César Santiago accompanies Gloria on her South American tour, Nayeli takes the opportunity to have an affair. While in Chile, César Santiago sees an admirer of Gloria and asks her to offer her a spot in her next auditions for a chorus girl. César Santiago attacks Gloria for disobeying his orders and uses her as an example so that none of the other girls will ever lie to him again. César Santiago is furious with Nayeli for being unfaithful and immediately withdraws all his support.
17	"Volver a caer"	1 September 2023	26 September 2023	2.9
Gloria takes advantage of her trip to Veracruz to get the ingredients to prepare a surprise for César Santiago. Nayeli begs César Santiago for a chance to prove he love, but he wants a divorce. Nayeli tires of the suffering she is subjected to with César Santiago and decides to return to her mother's house. Despite her fear of being booed, Gloria triumphs at the Viña del Mar music festival.
18	"Más sola"	1 September 2023	27 September 2023	2.8
As Edith prepares for her audition with César Santiago, Gloria tries to convince her to leave her country and fears for her when she arrives in Mexico. Gloria learns that her mother manipulated her great-grandmother's will to get her hands on her entire fortune. Gloria gets tired of her mother's lies and threatens to throw herself off the balcony, but Gloria Ruiz no longer falls for her blackmail. César Santiago tells Gloria that he was always right to call her mother a self-interested woman, causing a rift between them.
19	"Los intelectuales"	1 September 2023	28 September 2023	2.6
Nayeli's mother threatens César Santiago with speaking out if he does not give in to all their demands to sign the divorce, including a financial settlement. César Santiago criticizes Gloria for her sudden weight gain and demands that she be in shape for the day they make the adult-only calendar they have planned. Gloria decides to do the calendar by adding a social cause. Lisbeth gives birth to her son, but César Santiago organizes everything so that he can grow up away from home.
20	"Mi exclusividad es con César"	1 September 2023	29 September 2023	2.2
Emilio Azcárraga Milmo ends his working relationship with César Santiago because of the rumors swirling around Gloria. Gloria starts the habit of vomiting before her presentations and César Santiago complains to her, worried about the economic consequences it could represent. Alicia's album is released and Gloria is happy for her that she decides to accompany her in the promotion without thinking that this could diminish Alicia. César Santiago decides to terminate Gloria's exclusive contract and looks for another alternative for her promotion on television.
21	"Una nueva ilusión"	8 September 2023	2 October 2023	2.8
Gloria insists on ending her television exclusivity, but lawyers warn her to return the advance payment or she could face serious consequences. César Santiago confronts Gloria for flirting with a man at Katy's house and takes revenge for her betrayal. César Santiago manipulates Heidi in various ways and gets her to give herself on her own will. Gloria begins to feel dizzy and nauseated, so she suspects that she might be expecting César Santiago's child.
22	"Gato por liebre"	8 September 2023	3 October 2023	2.7
César Santiago's physical demands on Gloria during the filming of "Una papa sin catsup", force her to put herself at risk on more than one occasion. César Santiago confirms Gloria's pregnancy and feigns his support; however, he orders Alicia to travel with her to Houston to terminate it. Tamara, Edith's sister, shows interest in attending César Santiago's school and when he finds out, he asks Alicia to give her preference. Gloria relies on her dog to treat her depression at the loss of her son until César Santiago feels displaced, forcing him to restrict their contact.
23	"La manipulación"	8 September 2023	4 October 2023	2.7
César Santiago and Alicia speak ill of Gloria in front of the girls in order to provoke disagreements within the group. Gloria interrupts her concert in Monterrey to face the alleged attacks she made against her mother. César Santiago asks Gloria to intercede for him to seduce Liliana and when she refuses, he complains about her selfishness. César Santiago visits Liliana willing to be intimate with her, but is rejected by her.
24	"Retiro inesperado"	8 September 2023	5 October 2023	2.6
César Santiago complains to Gloria for making an attempt on her own life without paying attention to the depression she is in. César Santiago gets tired of waiting for his manipulation of Tamara to take effect and forces his will against her. Edith confronts César Santiago for hurting Tamara and he beats with his belt. César Santiago asks Gloria to announce her retirement due to his diagnosis.
25	"Lo que tú decides"	8 September 2023	6 October 2023	2.8
While Gloria laments César Santiago's terrible diagnosis, he recalls with joy the moment he learned that he does not suffer from any disease. Gloria is disappointed to learn of the proposal of exclusivity of the other television company and manages to negotiate the terms to return to Televisa. Gloria learns that the competition launched a series of programs led by Katy Godoy announcing the fall of her artistic career.
26	"Dueña de nada"	15 September 2023	9 October 2023	2.6
While Gloria is filming her program, she is terrified to see Nayeli in the audience. César Santiago decides to open a hotel next to the house in Ixtapa and asks Gloria to convince her mother to invest in it. César Santiago has irreconcilable problems with the producer of Gloria's show and decides to cancel it despite its success. Nayeli is interviewed by Katy Godoy to talk about her career and she takes the opportunity to talk about the hell she went through with César Santiago.
27	"Propuesta de matrimonio"	15 September 2023	10 October 2023	2.8
Lisbeth and César Santiago's daughter refuses to eat and he finds a way to force her to do so. Tamara gets tired of always being punished and looks to drown herself in the ocean. Tamara decides to give in to César Santiago's insistence and after forcing her to write a love letter, she receives a series of rewards. Gloria feels at peace for being able to return to the stage and proposes to César Santiago, but he assures her that she has not fulfilled all her promises.
28	"El exilio"	15 September 2023	11 October 2023	2.7
César Santiago is advised to go into hiding for an indefinite period of time. Despite the threats, Tamara confesses everything to her parents; César Santiago is forced to flee with Gloria and Alicia. Despite Tamara's detailed statements, the authorities state that they cannot file a complaint against César Santiago because the events did not occur in the country. César Santiago tells Gloria that Heidi is pregnant and to avoid another scandal, he is forced to marry her even though he is not sure if it is his child.
29	"Perdón, por favor, perdón"	15 September 2023	12 October 2023	2.7
Despite César Santiago's blackmail and manipulation, Heidi decides to go ahead with her pregnancy. Liliana loses the money when she arrives in Spain and César Santiago decides to make her pay with hunger and whipping her feet. Alicia convinces Mildred to travel with her despite Gloria's attempts to prevent it. Gloria must travel to Los Angeles for a casting but refuses to travel unless Mildred goes with her to bring her home safely.
30	"Especulaciones"	15 September 2023	13 October 2023	2.7
César Santiago rejects his child for being a boy, as he is not willing to share his family with any other man. Despite not agreeing to have a son, César Santiago takes all considerations with Heidi to give birth to their son Juan Antonio. César Santiago has the girls to move heavy rocks and threatens to harm Juan Antonio if they refuse to follow his orders. Gloria begs César Santiago to take action to diffuse the scandals about Nayeli's book and her sudden disappearance.
31	"Defender lo indefendible"	22 September 2023	16 October 2023	2.7
Gloria regrets celebrating her 30th birthday because she feels stagnant and exploited by César Santiago. César Santiago learns that Nayeli's book is already published along with a lawsuit against him. Gloria travels to Mexico and gives a series of interviews to defend César Santiago from Nayeli's accusations. César Santiago orders Heidi to travel to Mexico to join him even though she has not been able to get a passport for her son.
32	"Un escándalo a la vista"	22 September 2023	17 October 2023	2.7
Katy Godoy raises doubts about her radical change of opinion regarding Gloria. Gloria Ruiz gets Gloria a new lawyer to advise her on César Santiago's case, but when he meets her, he does not trust her. Heidi's son is hospitalized and César Santiago orders Alicia to leave him in Spain to avoid having to give answers. Gloria receives information that there is a warrant for her arrest if she shows up for her interview.
33	"Mi lugar está con el"	22 September 2023	18 October 2023	2.7
Gloria presents to the authorities the evidence that proves that Nayeli lied in her statements. Seeing Gloria carrying Lizbeth's child, César Santiago proposes to have a child and start a family. Gloria gets fed up with Arlene's constant criticism against her and fights her to put her in her place. Liliana suggests eating garbage as a new punishment and César Santiago accepts.
34	"La denuncia"	22 September 2023	19 October 2023	2.7
Alondra can no longer stand the punishment of eating garbage and escapes from the house, forcing the others to look for her all over Rio de Janeiro. Gloria Ruiz fears for the future of the family, as they have already begun to pay the consequences of the scandal in which Gloria is involved. César Santiago finds Arlene about to take pills and blames her for not obeying his order to stay away from her son. Gloria manages to convince César Santiago to give medical follow-up to her pregnancy and at the ultrasound she is moved to hear her daughter's heartbeat.
35	"Ana Dalai"	22 September 2023	20 October 2023	2.5
Yutzil tries to run away from home and asks the neighbor for help knowing that she is a police officer. César Santiago assures Gloria that they will finally be able to enjoy their life together but manages to get everything back to normal. Gloria gives birth to her baby Ana Dalai. Gloria manages to get in touch with her mother to tell her that she is a grandmother but she interrupts her with the news that she is wanted by international authorities.
36	"El dolor más grande del mundo"	29 September 2023	23 October 2023	3.0
César Santiago imposes a strict order to feed the babies so as not to lose the attention of the girls. Gloria faces several difficulties to baptize her daughter in the church, so she decides to do it herself. César Santiago allows Gloria to feed her daughter, but Yutzil gives her the news that the baby died. While Gloria assures that the death of her daughter is a punishment, César Santiago makes her see that he is not responsible for the loss.
37	"Más sola que nunca"	29 September 2023	24 October 2023	3.0
Gloria tells César Santiago that she has lost the will to live because she wants to be reunited with her daughter in heaven. Liliana wanders the streets of Rio de Janeiro in search of a place to bury Gloria's daughter, but she is afraid of being discovered by the police and decides to throw the body into a river. Gloria becomes ill to the point of hallucinations. César Santiago realizes that he is running out of money and refuses to go to a bank to avoid being discovered.
38	"Detenidos"	29 September 2023	25 October 2023	3.0
Manuel gives Gloria a few words of consolation for the difficult time she is going through. Heidi and Yutzil travel to Mexico to clear up the controversy but are arrested by the police after giving an interview. Liliana warns César Santiago that an Interpol agent called her house asking her to turn him in to the authorities. César Santiago goes to the market with Alondra and Gloria, but they are detained by the authorities.
39	"Presa"	29 September 2023	26 October 2023	2.9
Despite the insistence of the press, César Santiago and Gloria choose to keep quiet so as not to get into more trouble. César Santiago authorizes the girls to eat to avoid everything going bad and they take advantage of the situation to get rid of the rules he imposed inside the house. Although the scandal reaches the ears of the other inmates, Gloria insists that she, César Santiago and Alicia are innocent of all charges. Gloria learns that one of her fellow inmates managed to get pregnant despite not having conjugal visits and decides to find out about it in order to do the same.
40	"La traición"	29 September 2023	27 October 2023	2.7
Gloria Ruiz sends an investigation into her daughter's finances and discovers that despite all the money she has earned, she has nothing to her name. Gloria meets Luciano in jail and finds in him a true friendship. César Santiago takes advantage of the fact that Gloria wants to get pregnant to keep her by his side. Heidi gives a press conference where she declares that she is a victim of César Santiago's manipulations.
41	"Embarazo en prisión"	6 October 2023	30 October 2023	2.8
Gloria asks César Santiago to organize a series of interviews to talk about the loss of her daughter and prevent Heidi from profiting from her story. Gloria Ruiz travels to Brazil to meet with her daughter and asks her to accept that she was manipulated by César Santiago. Liliana, Alondra, Arlene and Heidi meet in Miami to agree on a version of what happened before giving an interview. Heidi publishes the book about her experiences and Gloria goes crazy when she learns secrets involving her daughter.
42	"Ángel Gabriel"	6 October 2023	31 October 2023	2.8
Liliana clears her conscience and gives her version of what happened with Gloria's daughter and hopes that she will finally open her eyes. Gloria complains to César Santiago for having ordered such an ending for her daughter and warns him that she no longer feels anything for him. Gloria is delighted to discover that she is pregnant, but the Brazilian authorities demand answers as to who the father is, but she refuses to give evidence.
43	"La extradición"	6 October 2023	1 November 2023	2.6
César Santiago publicly denies his paternity over Gloria's son, but is willing to adopt him as if he were. Gloria agrees to be extradited and returns to Mexico even though she knows she will be imprisoned in Chihuahua. Gloria is sentenced to prison for all the charges against her and makes her position clear. Gloria learns that César Santiago has decided to follow in her footsteps and will be incarcerated in the same prison as her.
44	"Armando, mi vida"	6 October 2023	2 November 2023	2.8
Gloria decides to protect her son by handing him over to her mother to take care of him while she is in prison. Armando declares his love for Gloria, but she warns him of all her faults before agreeing to something more serious. Armando asks Gloria to be his girlfriend, despite her warnings. César Santiago writes a letter to Gloria and the next day, before the hearing, she makes it clear that she no longer feels anything for him.
45	"Libre al fin"	6 October 2023	3 November 2023	2.7
Gloria receives a visit from Kabah with a proposal that will help her record her music. Gloria is about to make an important decision about her case, because if it goes wrong, she could lose years of work in court. The judge exonerates Gloria of all charges against her and she is released from prison. Despite being exonerated, Gloria discovers that there are still people who judge her because of the stories surrounding her.
46	"Empezar de cero"	13 October 2023	6 November 2023	2.7
Armando discovers dark parts of Gloria's past and questions her. Armando begins to feel jealous of Gloria's career as he realizes how much time she spends on recordings, interviews and presentations, she gets tired of his jealousy and gives him the option to leave. Armando is arrested for a crime he committed some time ago, but communicates with Gloria who helps him regain his freedom.
47	"Trevolución"	13 October 2023	7 November 2023	2.9
Armando's mother blames Gloria for all the problems her son is involved in, simply because she is his partner. The director of the record label warns Gloria that her agent pockets a significant amount of money in every deal he proposes to "improve" her career. Gloria confirms that she is pregnant again, but instead of rejoicing at the news, she worries about the possible business repercussions. Gloria tells her agent that she is expecting a child, he offends her and even proposes terminating the pregnancy.
48	"Todos me miran"	13 October 2023	8 November 2023	2.6
Gloria learns that César Santiago is out of prison, assuring that he will soon be reunited with her, but Gloria makes it clear that she will never have anything to do with him. Gloria travels to Chile and Edith clarifies the statements she made against her. Gloria presents "Todos me miran", but the director of the record label rejects her idea for the music video. Gloria's children are expelled from school because of their mother's music and scandals and Armando suggests moving to the capital.
49	"Mi boda"	13 October 2023	9 November 2023	2.9
Gloria regains her fame thanks to her participation in El show de los sueños and the success of her song "Cinco minutos". Gloria's son finds out about his mother's past and questions her about it. Armando organizes a dream wedding for Gloria and fulfills her wish to get married in church. Gloria meets with Liliana and gets up the courage to talk about what happened with her daughter.
50	"Ave Fénix"	13 October 2023	10 November 2023	2.8
Liliana gives Gloria a suitcase with all the mementos of her deceased daughter. Armando complains to Gloria for going out to eat without her security, she explodes and complains about his constant bad mood. A person close to Gloria orchestrates Armando's kidnapping and after several negotiations, he is released on the birthday of her deceased daughter. Gloria, Liliana, Edith and Tamara recognize that what they lived through is only one person's fault and celebrate having left the pain behind.

== Reception ==
=== Ratings ===
Viewership and ratings per season of Gloria Trevi: Ellas soy yo
Season	Timeslot (CT)	Episodes	First aired		Last aired		Avg. viewers (millions)
Season	Timeslot (CT)	Episodes	Date	Viewers (millions)	Date	Viewers (millions)	Avg. viewers (millions)
1	Mon–Fri 9:30 p.m.	50	4 September 2023	3.1	10 November 2023	2.8	2.70

=== Awards and nominations ===
Year	Award	Category	Nominated	Result	Ref
2024	Produ Awards	Best Biographical Series	Gloria Trevi: Ellas soy yo	Nominated	
2024	Produ Awards	Best Lead Actress/Actor - Biographical Series	Scarlet Gruber	Nominated	
