= María José Mariscal =

Mexican actress (born 2005)

María José Mariscal Archer
- Born: November 24, 2005 (age 20); Mexico City, Mexico
- Other names: Marijo
- Occupation: Actress
- Years active: 2011–present
- Parent: Paola Archer (mother)

María José Mariscal (born November 24, 2005), is a Mexican actress.

== Career ==
Mariscal studied at the Center for Arts Education (CEA) of Televisa. She started as an actress in the TV program La voz dormida in 2011. In 2012, she received her first lead role in Juan Osorio's telenovela Porque el amor manda, where she played Valentina. In 2013, Mariscal participated as a recurring role in the soap opera Por siempre mi amor, where she played child Marianela. In 2015, she appeared as Sarahi, the daughter of Jorge Salinas friend, for only fifty episodes of the series Mi corazón es tuyo. In 2016, she worked with Osorio and his son, Emilio, for a third a time in the telenovela Sueño de amor.

== Filmography ==
Year	Title	Character	Notes
2011	La voz dormida	Reclusa abofeteada	Reality Show
2012–2013	Porque el amor manda	Valentina Franco Hierro	Child protagonist; 182 episodes
2013	Por siempre mi amor	Child Marianela	Recurring role; 7 episodes
2014–2015	Mi corazón es tuyo	Sarai	Recurring role; 50 episodes
2016	Sueño de amor	Pamela	Recurring role
2016	El Hotel	Maria	feature film
2019	Cita a ciegas	Laura	Recurring role
2023	Gloria Trevi: Ellas soy yo	Alondra	Recurring role

== See also ==
- Isabella Tena
