= Wendy, perdida pero famosa =

- Genre: Reality television
- Directed by: Alejandro Bernal
- Starring: Wendy Guevara
- Country of origin: Mexico
- Original language: Spanish
- No. of seasons: 1
- No. of episodes: 13

Production
- Executive producers: Bilai Joa Silar; Augusto Rovegno; Carlos López de la Paz; Julia Tradd; Jaime Escallón; Marllalely Larios
- Editors: Alexandra Posada; Fausto Daniel Tapias; Johnnathan Campos; Cristian Gallego
- Production company: Endemol Shine Boomdog

Original release
- Network: Vix
- Release: 5 October – 21 December 2023

Wendy, perdida pero famosa (English: Wendy, Lost but Famous) is a Mexican reality television series that follows the life of Wendy Guevara. It premiered on Vix on 5 October 2023.

== Production ==
On 13 August 2023, Wendy Guevara won the first season of La casa de los famosos México, making history as the first transgender woman to win a reality show in Mexico. A few days later, it was announced that TelevisaUnivision had ordered a reality series starring Guevara for Vix. Filming of the series began in León, Guanajuato on 5 September 2023. The series premiered on 5 October 2023, with 13 episodes ordered.

== Episodes ==
No.	Title	Original release date
1	"Bienvenida a tu nueva realidad"	5 October 2023
2	"¡Fiesta en León!"	5 October 2023
3	"Cuba"	12 October 2023
4	"Transpower con La Bogue"	19 October 2023
5	"Fiesta mexicana y temazcal"	26 October 2023
6	"Buscando a las Pérdidas"	2 November 2023
7	"Divas y Divos"	9 November 2023
8	"Estreno de Resulta y Resalta"	16 November 2023
9	"Maratón de Ferias"	23 November 2023
10	"Wendy Inc."	30 November 2023
11	"Team Infierno para siempre"	7 December 2023
12	"Haciendo lo que más me gusta: comer"	14 December 2023
13	"Resulta y Resalta en León"	21 December 2023

== Awards and nominations ==
Year	Award	Category	Nominated	Result	Ref
2024	Produ Awards	Best Non-Scripted Celebrity Series	Wendy, perdida pero famosa	Nominated	

== See also ==
- Las Perdidas
