= Luz Elena González =

Luz Elena González may refer to:

- Luz Elena González Escobar (born 1974), Mexican economist, federal secretary of energy
- Luz Elena González (actress) (born 1974), Mexican actress and model
