= Zapatos viejos =

Zapatos Viejos
- Directed by: Sergio Andrade
- Starring: Gloria Trevi; Jorge Páez; Alma Muriel; Coco Levy; Silvia Derbez
- Release date: 1993
- Running time: 90 minutes
- Country: Mexico
- Language: Spanish

Zapatos Viejos (English: Old Shoes) is a 1993 Spanish-language film directed by Sergio Andrade.
