= Doña Flor y sus dos maridos =

Mexican telenovela

- Genre: Telenovela
- Based on: Dona Flor and Her Two Husbands by Jorge Amado
- Written by: Juan Andrés Granados; María Elena López Castañeda; Fernando Casillas; Alfredo Alejandro Ballestros; Maykel R. Ponjuán; Adriana Lorenzon
- Directed by: Benjamín Cann; Rodrigo Zaunbos
- Starring: Ana Serradilla; Sergio Mur; Joaquín Ferreira; Mariluz Bermúdez; Rebecca Jones
- Theme music composer: Michael Egred; Greeicy Rendón; Juan Manuel Rodríguez; Christian Tascón
- Opening theme: "Amantes" by Mike Bahía & Greeicy Rendón
- Country of origin: Mexico
- Original language: Spanish
- No. of seasons: 1
- No. of episodes: 65

Production
- Executive producer: Eduardo Meza
- Producers: Carolina Gallastegui; María Alba Espinosa
- Editor: Pablo Peralta
- Camera setup: Multi-camera
- Production company: Televisa

Original release
- Network: Las Estrellas
- Release: 25 March – 21 June 2019

Related
- Dona Flor e seus dois maridos (film)

Doña Flor y sus dos maridos, is a Mexican telenovela produced by Eduardo Meza for Televisa that premiered on Las Estrellas on 25 March 2019 and ended on 21 June 2019. The show is based on the 1966 Brazilian novel of the same name written by Jorge Amado. Production began on 22 November 2018 in Mexico City, and it stars Ana Serradilla, Sergio Mur, and Joaquín Ferreira.

== Plot ==
Flor Méndez has always felt different to all the women she knows and it is that her passionate temperament and independent spirit, sometimes does not go with the limited horizons of the town where she was born. Flor's greatest passion is dancing, despite Margarita, who forbade it, since the death of Narciso, Flor's father. Margarita blames Flor for this death, although the reality is different. Flor seems resigned and works as a receptionist in the dance academy of the town, but also continues to dance, in secret. Her dream opportunity comes when she is invited to audition for a major company in Mexico City. Flor decides to pursue her dream and this causes a conflict with Margarita, which leads her to leave town. During the party of Tlaxcalixtlahuacaca, Flor dances with the group of the academy, in front of all the town. At the party Valentín Hernández approaches and dances with her, the connection between both is instantaneous. Valentín is a "Robin Hood" type swindler, rogue and seductive, with great sensual appeal. Valentín arrives in town with his friend, El Chile. They are fleeing from Cassandra, Valentín's former lover and partner. His arrival will not only disrupt Flor's life, but also of the entire town.

The attraction between Flor and Valentín is very strong, only that she is determined to succeed and travels to Mexico City. Valentín follows her, willing to support her and she accepts it. Meanwhile, another man has been disappointed with the absence of Flor, Dr. Teodoro Hidalgo, her childhood friend, who days before, is rejected by Flor, by asking her to marry him. This causes Teodoro to decide to go to Spain to study a specialty. Flor auditions, but when she performs her test, she suffers a fall, the injury is irreversible and she is incapable of dancing professionally again. This circumstance unites her to Valentín and by mutual agreement they decide to marry, in order to pay for the surgery that Flor needs. The couple starts their life in the city and the attraction becomes a deep love. Later, they return to Tlaxcalixtlahuacaca, where Flor confronts not only her family, but the entire town, for being accustomed to judging all those who act differently. Soon, Valentín makes friends and enemies, such as Octavio and Samantha Mercader, owners of the casino.

Valentín's eagerness to give Flor everything she needs, causes him to get into trouble again, without his wife's knowledge. And when nobody expects it, Valentín dies from a heart attack on a night of partying. His death is a blow for Flor and everyone in town. Only, along with the sadness, they also discover the lies of Valentín. In the middle of all this, Teodoro reappears, who consoles Flor. What almost everyone ignores is that Valentín, turned into a ghost, will return to try to recover Flor's love and discover that she is married to Teodoro.

== Cast ==
=== Main ===
- Ana Serradilla as María Florencia "Flor" Méndez Canúl
- Sergio Mur as Teodoro "Teo" Hidalgo Flores
- Joaquín Ferreira as Valentín Hernández
- Mariluz Bermúdez as Samantha Cabrera de Serrano
- Rebecca Jones as Margarita Canúl
- Alejandro Calva as Octavio Mercader Serrano
- Roberto Blandón as Óscar Hidalgo
- Carlos Corona as Padre Elpidio
- Ximena Ayala as Rosalía Méndez Canúl
- Liz Gallardo as Mariana Santos Cruz
- Ianis Guerrero as Aureliano Méndez Canúl
- Ricardo Polanco as Porfirio "El Chile" Habanero López
- Vicky Araico as Itzamara Bianchi Roldán
- Jorge Luis Vázquez as Joaquín Valderrábano Pech
- Alejandra Ley as Micaela Navarro Robles
- Fernando Robles as Nestor
- Luis Curiel as Sixto "Tito" Bianchi Roldán
- Ilse Ikeda as Elsa
- Elizabeth Guindi as Tere
- Gina Pedret as Jovita
- Talia Marcela as Carmen
- Cecilia Constantino as Gladys
- Rocío de Santiago as Páris
- Karla Esquivel as Lola
- Susana Jiménez as Gris
- Patricio José as Lalo
- Miranda Goncalves as Xóchitl Méndez Santos
- Alexander Tavizon as Diego
- Alfredo Huereca as Bendito
- Sol Madrigal as Cassandra
- Lorena del Castillo as Malba

=== Guest stars ===
- Eugenio Cobo as Artemio
- Sylvia Pasquel as Carlota and Maximiliana
- Alberto Agnesi as Atahualpa
- Wendy Guevara as Wendy
- Paola Suárez as Paola

== Ratings ==
Viewership and ratings per season of Doña Flor y sus dos maridos
Season	Episodes	First aired		Last aired		Avg. viewers (millions)
Season	Episodes	Date	Viewers (millions)	Date	Viewers (millions)	Avg. viewers (millions)
1	64	25 March 2019	3.5	21 June 2019	2.4	2.34

== Episodes ==
No.	Title	Original release date	Viewers (millions)
1	"Valentín muere frente a Flor"	25 March 2019 (Note: Premiered early online through Las Estrellas website and YouTube channel on 22 March 2019.)	3.5
Flor is waiting for Valentín to dance together at the carnival, but when he arrives he collapses and dies in Flor's arms. A year before, Valentín and El Chile commit a millionaire robbery and try to escape. Upon arriving at the small town where they plan to take refuge, Valentín meets Flor, the woman who will change his life. Flor goes to Mexico City in search of her dream of being a dancer, even though Margarita, her mother, does not believe in her.
2	"Teo le propone matrimonio a Flor"	26 March 2019	3.0
After clarifying the motorcycle incident, Teo takes the courage to ask Flor to marry him. She rejects him and makes it clear that she can only see him as a friend. Valentín takes advantage of the situation and begins his own conquest. El Chile meets Valentín in town and gives him the briefcase of his robbery, but Cassandra and Malba follow in their footsteps.
3	"La muerte de Valderrábano es un mal augurio"	27 March 2019	3.2
Valderrábano dies because of Cassandra, which causes fear in Tlaxcalixtlahuacaca. The women of the town say that with her dance, Flor has unleashed the demons, so she decides to go to Mexico City.
4	"Flor ya tiene marido"	28 March 2019	2.8
Flor arrives in Mexico City and performs her audition, but an accident seems to stop her dream, and in addition, she will have to pay an expensive operation. Valentín offers Flor to use his insurance to pay for her foot operation, but for this to happen they would have to get married and she accepts.
5	"Flor y Valentín se están enamorando"	29 March 2019	2.8
Everything seems to indicate that Flor and Valentín already feel something for each other, but Flor still does not know what Valentín is hiding from her. Valentín feels obliged to tell her the whole truth about his past. Rosalía asks Teo for an opportunity to try a relationship between them.
6	"Valentín es perfecto"	1 April 2019	2.9
As Valentín still does not confess to Flor who he really is, she describes him as the ideal man. Aureliano steals from Mariana the money from the sale of Flor's motorcycle. El Chile proposes Valentín to be his business partner but, at the same time, Flor begins to doubt his business.
7	"Flor perdona a Valentín por amor"	2 April 2019	3.0
Flor catches Valentín selling tacos and gets angry with him for hiding the truth of his job, but she will forgive him for the great love she feels and for the promise of being together. The trial against Cassandra is carried out.
8	"Flor regresa a Tlaxcalixtlahuacaca"	3 April 2019	2.6
Since neither Valentín nor Flor have money, she proposes to her husband to return to Tlaxcalixtlahuacaca but, after being arrested, Flor fears that Valentín's lies complicate their situation. Rosalia reveals to Margarita that she will marry Teo.
9	"Flor y Valentín no van a terminar nada bien"	4 April 2019	2.6
The women of the town reject Flor's return and they demand her to go away, because nobody wants her in the town. Teo finds Flor and Valentín in a romantic moment. Itzamara is sure that if Flor and Valentín continue together, something bad will happen.
10	"Teo intenta suicidarse por amor"	5 April 2019	2.7
Teo does not support the idea of losing Flor and that she is married, so he gets drunk and wanders around Tlaxcalixtlahuacaca with a pistol in hand. Margarita asks Father Elpidio to hide behind his cassock and to forget about her and what they were.
11	"El Chile recibe una visita del más allá"	8 April 2019	2.6
El Chile hears voices from beyond and is scared to see that Valderrábano’s spirit requires his help. After discovering Valentín’s cheating in the casino, Samantha offers her silence in exchange for having sex; otherwise, Flor could be a very young widow.
12	"Flor inaugura su escuela de baile"	9 April 2019	2.6
Although Margarita tries to make Flor and Valentín unable to pay for the house, they finally inaugurate their dance academy, but it seems that the business does not start at all well. Valentín secretly records his encounter with Samantha so that later he can manipulate and stop her threats. By not agreeing to her wishes, Samantha betrays Valentín with Octavio.
13	"Flor y Valentín se casan por la iglesia"	10 April 2019	2.4
Flor asks Valentín, with everything and an engagement ring, to join their lives now in the church. Itzamara's cards reveal to her that a new soul is on the way. Cassandra is released and Malba has news to celebrate her freedom.
14	"Valentín está muerto"	11 April 2019	2.4
Rosalía discovers that Teo has returned to town but has not arrived alone. Both Cassandra and Octavio have enough reasons to put an end to Valentín, who, upon reaching his encounter with Flor, dies suddenly. Teo tries to revive him, but his attempts did not help at all.
15	"Flor está destrozada"	12 April 2019	2.6
Flor is devastated to learn that Valentín, the man she loves, has just died; everyone in the town offers their support. Before leaving town, Cassandra plans to tell Flor everything Valentín did to her, according to her, to help her overcome the mourning of being a widow.
16	"Valentín regresa a Tlaxcalixtlahuacaca... ¡como fantasma!"	15 April 2019	2.4
During the last goodbye Mass, Valentín returns from death, as a ghost. Cassandra and Samantha go to Flor to reveal the atrocities that Valentín did to them.
17	"¿Valentín tiene un hijo?"	16 April 2019	2.8
Flor begins to discover all the tricks that Valentín had hidden in life. While Valentín's funeral is being held, Paris and company look for the lottery ticket at Flor's house. Octavio asks Flor to take responsibility for the debt that Valentín had with him.
18	"Flor no está embarazada"	17 April 2019	2.5
Flor no longer knows who she was married to, after finding out that Valentín also had a son, for whom he was not responsible. Given this, Valentín asks Valderrábano to teach him how to communicate with his wife. Flor receives the news that the pregnancy test that she took failed.
19	"Flor está en la ruina por culpa de Valentín"	18 April 2019	1.9
The lottery ticket does not appear and the debts left by Valentín could leave Flor without a home and without a dance academy. Valentín communicates with El Chile, through Valderrábano. Octavio proposes Flor to dance in his casino so that she can pay Valentín's debt.
20	"Flor planea huir de Tlaxcalixtlahuacaca"	19 April 2019	2.0
Flor refuses to dance at Octavio's casino to pay Valentín's debts and prefers to leave town. At the casino, Flor learns about the relationship between her brother Aureliano and Paris.
21	"Flor está en peligro"	22 April 2019	2.3
Flor leaves town again, so Teo decides to go and look for her. The man who gives Flor a ride tries to sexually abuse her. Aureliano confesses to his wife Mariana his infidelity with Paris.
22	"Teo rescata a Flor... y se besan"	23 April 2019	2.1
Teo saves Flor from being attacked by the man who "helps" her and kisses her because he is still in love with her. Valentín feels jealous and manages to make Flor see him again. Xóchitl escapes from her house, after finding out of the separation of her parents.
23	"Se va viuda y Flor regresa con otro a Tlaxcalixtlahuacaca"	24 April 2019	2.4
Flor returns to Tlaxcalixtlahuacaca, from the hand of her current boyfriend, Teo. Valentín and Chile manage to communicate and their first plan will be to separate Flor from Teo. Valderrábano tries to make Valentín understand that he has to let Flor go so he can rest in peace, but Valentín clings to separating her from Teo.
24	"Valentín pierde sus privilegios en el más allá"	25 April 2019	2.4
Carlota, the celestial delegate, informs Valentín that he has lost the privilege of knowing what his mission is to transcend. Flor offers fair treatment to Octavio so they can work together. Mariana and Aureliano find Xóchitl and they promise that they will not separate, so that she will return home. Chile tries to explain to Flor that Valentin is on earth and wants to mend all his mistakes, but she refuses to believe that this is true.
25	"Margarita ya quiere que Flor se case otra vez"	26 April 2019	2.4
Margarita believes that Flor and Teo are no longer for long dating and requires them to set a date for the wedding. Valentín tries to get Flor to believe El Chile about him being there, taking care of her. Father Elpidio is given the task of finding out if Aureliano is his son.
26	"El Chile quiere formalizar con Margarita"	29 April 2019	2.5
Margarita continues to pressure Flor and Teo to decide to marry and Rosalia advises her to seek a new love, but Margarita refuses despite living a secret love with El Chile. El Chile asks Margarita to tell everyone about their relationship, but as she refuses, El Chile gives her an ultimatum. Valentín points out to Flor that not even dead is he going to allow her to form a family with Teo.
27	"Teo quiere pasar la noche con Flor"	30 April 2019	2.2
Teo organizes a romantic dinner with Flor and proposes to be together. El Chile reveals to Flor that he has placed the money according to Valentín's instructions. Octavio presents Flor as the new casino choreographer. Samantha begins to meddle in Aureliano's marriage to get him in trouble, since she benefits from this problem.
28	"Flor se está volviendo loca"	1 May 2019	2.2
Flor listens to Valentín, who swears he still loves her. Flor thinks she is losing her mind for listening to Valentín and thinks that she will end up in a psychiatric hospital. Margarita reveals to El Chile that Aureliano is Elpidio's son, at the same time that he points out to Óscar that he believes Aureliano is his son.
29	"¿Valentín venderá su alma al diablo?"	2 May 2019	2.3
Valentin could get Teo out of the way as long as he accepts the help of Maximiliana, the delegate of hell. Flor sends a message to Valentín through El Chile.
30	"Valentín se aprovecha de Rosalía para destruir a Teo"	3 May 2019	2.5
Valentín betrays the trust of his best friend in order to regain Flor's confidence and love. Rosalía discovers the love between El Chile and her mother and blackmails her, but Valentín will stand between her plans. Mariana can no longer fool Xochitl, so she asks Aureliano for a divorce.
31	"Samantha es la nueva dueña del casino"	6 May 2019	2.3
Thanks to the signing of the divorce, Samantha becomes the owner of the casino and will replace Octavio. Thanks to the evils of Valentín, Margarita is forced to make Teo leave her home, so he won't discover her relationship El Chile.
32	"La mentira de Margarita"	7 May 2019	2.4
In order to keep her secret, Margarita makes up a terminal illness to keep Flor and Teo separate. Aureliano takes Xóchitl to live with him, due to the crisis his marriage with Mariana goes through.
33	"Pongámosle fecha ya"	8 May 2019	2.0
Teo confesses to Flor that if it were for him they would marry at that moment. Flor is shocked, but accepts and asks him to decide the date. Maximiliana demands from Valentín that, if he wants to talk to Flor, he must first sign the deal between them.
34	"Exclusividad en el infierno"	9 May 2019	N/A
Valentín signs the deal with Maximiliana and already has one year exclusivity in hell. Valentín is allied with Rosalía to not allow Flor and Teo to join their lives. Margarita and El Chile are reunited and resume their relationship.
35	"La desesperación de Rosalía"	10 May 2019	1.8
Flor agrees to marry Teo. Rosalía does not know what to come up with to separate Flor and Teo and now she says that Margarita needs a kidney transplant. El Chile is accused of harassing Margarita, so Néstor will put a series of restrictions on him.
36	"Rosalía y Margarita caen en su propia trampa"	13 May 2019	2.2
Teo discovers Margarita and Rosalía's lie, tells Flor and together they prepare everything for the kidney transplant that his mother-in-law needs. El Chile is detained for getting too close to Margarita.
37	"Rosalía prueba los besos fantasmales de Valentín"	14 May 2019	2.2
Valentín wants to avoid at all costs that Rosalía spoils his plans to separate Flor from Teo. Faced with the pressures of Flor and Teo, Margarita confesses the truth in the operating room, as they make her believe that she would be really operated. Father Elpidio discovers the truth about his fatherhood. After unmasking the lie of Rosalía and Margarita, Teo proposes to Flor that they move up the date of their wedding.
38	"Teo y Flor terminan... ¡otra vez!"	15 May 2019	2.1
Rosalía shows Flor the compromising messages of Teo, which Valentín has written. Fed up with Flor's distrust, Teo decides to end their commitment and return to Spain.
39	"Flor y Teo celebran una loca despedida de solteros"	16 May 2019	2.1
Margarita asks Teo not to show up at the wedding, believing he has made fun of her two daughters. Rosalía, Tito and Valentín want to avoid Flor and Teo's wedding, so they will try to make her disappointed in him. Teo and Flor spend time with their friends and have fun at their respective bachelor and bachelorette party. Valentín puts an extra ingredient in El Chile's dessert and the men of Tlaxcalixtlahuacaca get out of control.
40	"¿Qué pasó ayer... en Tlaxcalixtlahuacaca?"	17 May 2019	2.6
The assistants of Teo's bachelor party begin to remember what happened the night of the celebration. The day of Flor and Teo's wedding arrives. So that Flor does not marry, Tito will reveal Father Elpidio's secret. Valentín asks Maximiliana to send him to hell, because he will not stand to see Flor married to Teo.
41	"Los declaro marido y mujer"	20 May 2019	2.0
Flor and Teo finally get married and he wants to spend the night with her. Óscar confesses his double identity to Father Elpidio. El Chile is worried, because Valentín does not appear anywhere.
42	"Las imprudencias del padre Elpidio"	21 May 2019	1.9
The town of Tlaxcalixtlahuacaca has rebelled against Father Elpidio for his supposed romance with Margarita. They ask that he no longer be their priest and that Margarita leaves town. Flor and Teo live a special night and after some setbacks, Flor gives herself to love and to Teo.
43	"El escándalo de Margarita"	22 May 2019	2.2
To defend Father Elpidio, Margarita confesses who her lover is, news that will leave Flor frozen. Mariana and Aureliano sign the divorce and now they will fight for the custody of Xóchitl.
44	"Problemas en el paraíso"	23 May 2019	2.2
Teo wants Flor to close her dance academy and get pregnant as soon as possible, but Flor does not agree. El Chile apologizes to Aureliano and Flor for having a relationship with Margarita.
45	"Encuentros cercanos del tercer tipo en Tlaxcalixtlahuacaca"	24 May 2019	2.2
Flor can now see Valentín. He wants to show her how much he loves her and steals a kiss, but Teo catches her in a strange situation. Margarita confronts Jovita, as she continues to defame her and to speak ill of her.
46	"A la cama con sus dos maridos"	27 May 2019	1.9
Valentín does not stop harassing Flor, so when she goes to sleep with Teo, the ghost joins them on a warm night. Mariana and Aureliano recognize that their selfishness has affected Xóchitl.
47	"#LadyHarta"	28 May 2019	2.1
Because of Jovita, Margarita is the mockery of the town to become a meme and the famous #LadyHarta. Samantha arrives at limbo and Valentín will help her return to life, but he will put a condition on her. Teo tells Flor that he has heard her ask Valentín to caress her. Samantha confesses the truth to Flor about Valentín, he never cheated on her.
48	"Atahualpa Madero"	29 May 2019	2.0
Atahualpa Madero, art restorer, arrives at Tlaxcalixtlahuacaca and will impact the town. Samantha gives Teo a series of tips to make Flor fall in love with him even more. Valentín does everything possible to separate Flor from Teo, so he becomes Flor's shadow and spoils her romantic moments.
49	"No somos odio, somos amor"	30 May 2019	2.1
As the people of Tlaxcalixtlahuacaca attack Celeste after revealing her identity, Father Elpidio organizes a movement against homophobia. Teo feels insecure because Flor mentions Valentín while she sleeps. Meanwhile, Itzamara points out to Flor her perception that she has not stopped loving Valentín.
50	"Le pongo el cuerno a mi marido... ¡con mi marido!"	31 May 2019	2.1
Flor forgives Valentín and kisses him, but she gets remorse for cheating on Teo with her dead husband.
51	"Yo soy Celeste"	3 June 2019	2.1
Óscar confesses in front of all the people that he is Celeste. Upon hearing this, Teo is completely disappointed in his dad. Flor is seduced by Valentín. Valentín confesses to Chile that he can not feel anything while being with Flor, but he does not want to give in to her being happy with Teo.
52	"Margarita se va de Tlaxcalixtlahuacaca"	4 June 2019	2.3
After the constant humiliations, Margarita has taken the decision to leave town and enter a nursing home. Rosalía insinuates to Atahualpa the intentions that she has towards him, while he begins to make a painting of her. Óscar is discriminated against in the town for being transgender. Flor tries to fix the situation, but the result is not positive.
53	"El Chile y Margarita se van a casar"	5 June 2019	2.4
Aureliano tells El Chile that he and his sisters agree with the romance he has with Margarita. El Chile formally asks Margarita to marry him and she accepts.
54	"Amor de tres es una mala relación"	6 June 2019	2.0
Teo and Flor can not have intimacy because Valentín interrupts all the time, so Teo believes there is someone else in his wife's life. Atahualpa tells Mariana how he feels about her.
55	"Teo espía a Flor"	7 June 2019	2.1
Teo can no longer have doubts about a possible infidelity of Flor, so he decides to spy on her trip to Mexico City. Valentín's ghost tries to seduce Flor in the shower. Mariana and Atahualpa have a romantic kiss.
56	"La confesión de Margarita"	10 June 2019	2.1
Margarita reveals to Flor what really caused the death of her father. Flor has made a decision on which of her two husbands to stay with and announces it to Valentín.
57	"Un invitado en Tlaxcalixtlahuacaca"	11 June 2019	2.0
Elsa reveals to Flor that Valentín never found out that he had a son. Diego, Valentín's son, will stay for a few days at Flor's house, something that Teo does not seem to like very much.
58	"La desaparición de Elsa"	12 June 2019	2.1
Flor and Teo are worried because Elsa, Diego's mother, has disappeared, unaware that she has been arrested for drug trafficking. Teo begins to win the love and admiration of Diego. Valentín feels jealous, but he can not do anything about it.
59	"Cuida a mi hijo, Flor"	13 June 2019	2.1
After being arrested for drug trafficking, Elsa asks Flor to take care of her son. Teo and Flor will not allow Diego to go to an orphanage, so they will fight for custody. Mariana points out to Atahualpa that she can not have a relationship with him, because her daughter needs her.
60	"La vida de Diego está en peligro"	14 June 2019	2.1
Diego escapes to see his mother, but on the way he suffers an accident that will put him between life and death. Aureliano explodes with jealousy when he sees Mariana with other men. But thanks to his father, he accepts and realizes that he can not do more to recover her love.
61	"¿Con quien se quedará Diego?"	17 June 2019	2.3
While Teo and Flor will do everything possible to stay with Diego, Valentín and El Chile will try to save him from a social worker. Aureliano asks Mariana to be friends, for the sake of their daughter Xóchitl.
62	"La traición de Flor"	18 June 2019	2.1
Before Diego's adoption procedures begin, Flor confesses to Teo that she has been unfaithful, but she does not have the courage to tell him that her infidelity was with Valentín's ghost. Lola tells Tito what she feels for him and asks him to be a couple.
63	"Yo maté a Valentín"	19 June 2019	2.1
Octavio exploits jealousy against Teo, so he begins to chase him down the road to cause him an accident. In addition, he confesses to have also killed Valentín. Chile proposes to Margarita to adopt Diego. Valentín begins to understand the whole series of problems he has caused since his return to earth, so he offers his sincere apology to Flor.
64	"Teo y Valentín se encuentran en el paraíso"	20 June 2019	2.5
While the doctor recommends Flor to say goodbye to Teo, due to the severity of his injuries, The soul of Teo is with Valentín, who, in addition to confess to have gotten involved with Flor, begs him to return to his body.
65	"Valentín se sacrifica por amor"	21 June 2019	2.4
Valentín decides to go to paradise with Carlota in exchange for the soul of Teo returning with his beloved Flor. Valentín asks permission to do one last thing on earth, say goodbye to the woman he loved the most in life.
