= Todos Me Miran =

Single by Gloria Trevi

from the album La Trayectoria
- Language: Spanish
- Released: August 5, 2006
- Genre: Latin pop
- Length: 3:25
- Label: Univison
- Songwriter: Gloria Treviño

"Todos Me Miran" ("Everyone looks at me") is a song by the Mexican artist Gloria Trevi. Released as a single in 2006, the song peaked at number 18 on the Billboard Latin Pop Songs chart and number 32 on the Hot Latin Songs chart. It was featured on Trevi's 2006 live album La Trayectoria. The song, as interpreted in the music video, is about a young man who dares to crossdress in spite of society's opinions. The song became a club anthem that confirmed Trevi's status as a gay icon.

With this new production Gloria once again entered the international music charts. It was an unparalleled success throughout Latin America, the United States, Mexico and returned her to the popularity she had established in the nineties in the European region, climbing to the top positions in countries such as Croatia, Belgium, Sweden, Germany, Romania, Italy and France and reaffirming her status as a consecrated star in her strongest market in that continent, Spain. Todos me miran became her biggest international hit since Pelo suelto, and is also considered her most representative song and one of the songs responsible for building Spanish pop music during the 2000s, opening the doors to the foreign market for what would become the new musical generations. Today it is one of the biggest references in Latin pop culture worldwide and established Gloria as the biggest Spanish-speaking LGBT Icon.

The song was presented in Premios lo Nuestro 2007 as the opening act for the ceremony and winner Video of the Year. Gloria revisited the ceremony for the first time since 1993.

== Charts ==
| Chart | Peak |
|---|---|
| France International Airplay | 73 |
| Italy FIMI | 68 |
| Germany Hot 50 | 42 |
| Romania Airplay 40 | 36 |
| US Billboard Latin Pop Songs | 18 |
| US Billboard Hot Latin Songs | 32 |
| Puerto Rico Los 40 Fidelity | 16 |
| Sweden Hitparade | 12 |
| Brazil International Airplay | 2 |
| Spain Los 40 | 1 |
| Argentina Monitor Latino | 1 |
| Colombia National Report | 1 |
| Mexico Amprofon Singles Chart | 1 |
| Chile Monitor Latino | 1 |
| Dominican Republic Monitor Latino | 1 |
| Peru Monitor Latino | 1 |
| Bolivia Monitor Latino | 1 |

== Commercial performance ==
The song was released as the first single of what would be Gloria's first DVD recording titled La Trajectoria. It was distributed as a single CD and also on Digital Download worldwide. Initially, her label at the time Univision Music Group did not bet on large promotional investments for the single, mainly in the United States, where it did not have the support of Latin music stations and which seriously affected its performance in the territory, reaching position 32 in the Hot Latin Songs and the first twenty places of the Latin Pop Songs the most important lists of Billboard, in which it remained for more than 35 weeks. For the year 2011 Nielsen SoundScan reported that some 107,429 digital copies of the single would have been distributed in the United States.

In Mexico, her native country immediately took over the top positions in the charts, dominating the Monitor Latino and Spanish Airplay as the most broadcast theme for eight weeks, in physical and digital sales it ranked first in the Mexican Association of Producers of Phonograms and Videograms (AMPROFON), promoting the commercialization of La Trajectory and allowing it to win a gold record for more than 75,000 copies sold in Mexican territory.

For Latin America, it marked her triumphant return on radio and television programs, reaping a warm and swift reception from the general public. It was positioned as the most consumed theme at the national level in eight countries of the Monitor Latino region, including: Argentina, Colombia, Chile, Ecuador, Bolivia, Guatemala, Peru and the Dominican Republic, allowing Gloria to visit most of these with her then trevolution tour. Especially in Argentina Gloria offered several performances in the most important television programs in the country such as Américan Idol and the Susana Giménez Show interpreting Todos me miran. In other countries such as Brazil the song reached the second position in the International Airplay count, its greatest success in the country to date, for its part in Venezuela it was among the first ten nationally of the Record Report while in Puerto Rico it was number sixteen, while Gloria performed two concerts in the country.

In Europe it was positioned among the most popular songs on radio and records in several countries. The most significant would be Spain, where it achieved first position for more than 5 weeks on the Los 40 radio network (Spain), a fact that would earn it a nomination at the 2007 Los 40 Music Awards gala in the "Latin Song of the Year" category. In the list of physical and digital sales of the Iberian country Top 50 Physical Sales it would be in the fourth box, while it would become one of the 100 most popular songs in the country in the annual charts from 2007 to 2009, years in which Gloria performed at one of the most important celebrations in the country, the Gran Canaria Festival in commemoration of Gay Pride, performing a concert in front of more than 4,000 attendees and crowned Queen of Gay Pride. In 2010, Everyone Looks at Me was already a consolidated anthem in the country and her biggest success since Pelo Suelto. In the same year, Universal Music Latin Entertainment, the label that distributed Una Rosa Blu Deluxe Edition in Spain, reported that more than 95,000 copies of the song had been sold in digital and polyphonic downloads in the mother country, while Psicofonía was certified with a gold record.

In other European regions such as Sweden it was a great commercial success reaching position twelve of the international Hit Parade, dominating that week as the only Latin female song, in Romania and Germany it would be among the 50 most consumed in the Hot Airplay counts. In Italy, the Federation of the Italian Music Industry reported her appearance at number 68 in the count, the highest of her career until then, while in France he was number 73 in the 200 Latin Airplay country.

== Sales ==
| Country | holding company | Sales |
|---|---|---|
| Spain | Universal Music Group | 95.000 |
| United States | Nielsen Soundscan | 107.429 |

== Awards and nominations ==
The song was nominated in the "Video of the Year" category and was featured as the opening act at the 2007 Premios lo Nuestro ceremony. It was also nominated at the Premios Oye! as "Recording of the Year" in 2007 and won an award at the Society of Authors and Composers of Mexico (SACM) for its composition. In Spain at the Los 40 Music Awards gala she was nominated for "Latin Song of the Year" while Gloria Trevi had a nomination for "Best Mexican Act". received a nomination for "Song of the Year" and "Latin Artist of the Year".
