= Libre para amarte =

- Genre: Telenovela
- Directed by: José Ángel García; Juan Carlos de Llaca
- Starring: Gabriel Soto; Gloria Trevi; Eduardo Santamarina; Jacqueline Andere; Luz Elena González
- Opening theme: "Libre para amarte" Gloria Trevi
- Ending theme: "No soy un pájaro" Gloria Trevi
- Countries of origin: Mexico City, Mexico
- Original language: Spanish
- No. of episodes: 106

Production
- Executive producer: Emilio Larrosa
- Producer: Arturo Pedraza Loera
- Production location: Mexico
- Cinematography: Gerardo Gómez Lapena; Luis Monroy
- Running time: 42-45 minutes
- Production company: Televisa

Original release
- Network: Canal de las Estrellas
- Release: June 17 – November 10, 2013

Related
- Los canarios

Libre para amarte (Free to Love You) is a 2013 Mexican telenovela produced by Emilio Larrosa for Televisa. It is based on the Colombian telenovela Los canarios.

Gabriel Soto and Eduardo Santamarina star as the protagonists, with a stellar performance by the singer and actress Gloria Trevi for first time in a soap opera as Aurora Valencia, with Jesús Ochoa and Consuelo Duval as the co-protagonists while Harry Geithner, Luz Elena González and the first actress Jacqueline Andere star as the antagonists.

== Plot ==
Aurora Valencia is a young woman who faces challenges and adversities with strength and determination. Her main characteristic is that she will allow nothing to beat her. She has had a long-term relationship with Ramón Sotomayor and lives with her daughter Blanquita and her father Virgilio. She earns her living as a taxi driver and instructor in a gym.

Ramón, the boyfriend of Aurora, lives with his mother, Amelia. He is a rogue, but a charming rogue, who constantly has his girlfriend in a rise and fall of encountered emotions. However, he will always find a way to keep her in love until Enrique, Don Zacarias del Pino's son, owner of the taxi stand, "Los Cocodrilos". Enrique, after completing his master's degree in economics in London, returns to Mexico City and, when boarding a taxi, meets Aurora, who drives the taxi. Later, both will be surprised to learn that he is the son of the owner of that taxi site.

An attraction gradually develops between them, complicated by their respective relationships. Aurora is in a relationship with Ramón, while Enrique is engaged to Romina, whom he met in London. Romina opposes Enrique's relationship with Aurora, as does Amelia, who was previously wealthy but is now experiencing financial difficulties.

She has many conflicts with Ramón because of his relationship with 'the roulette wheel', as she calls him. Don Zacarias, the owner of Los Cocodrilos, is a grumpy, angry, bossy but charming man. He is severely criticized by his son for setting up the taxi stand in his own home. From a balcony he dispatches each of his "crocodiles" and will bring in check their drivers, each of them with a very particular personality. The taxi drivers, besides Aurora, are Benjamín, Adela, Olivia, Poncho and Gerardo "El Gallo", companions and friends who know what it is to face day after day for more than eight hours, behind a wheel in a city with more than Four and a half million vehicles.

Napoleón Vergara is a white-collar criminal involved in illicit business activities and the collection of valuable works of art. He acts as an antagonist to Aurora Valencia and the other characters. The story follows Aurora as she deals with personal and romantic conflicts while developing relationships with those around her.

== Cast ==
Actor	Character
Gloria Trevi	Aurora Valencia
Gabriel Soto	Enrique del Pino
Eduardo Santamarina	Ramón Sotomayor Lascurain
Luz Elena González	Romina Montenegro
Jacqueline Andere	Amelia Lascuráin de Sotomayor
Harry Geithner	Napoleón Vergara
Jesús Ochoa	Zacarías del Pino
Consuelo Duval	Adela Díaz Granados
Jorge Muñiz	Benjamín Hernández Alpuche
Claudia Troyo	Olivia Garza León
Lenny de la Rosa	Gerardo "El Gallo" Jiménez
Pierre Angelo	Alfonso "Poncho" Sandoval
Lalo "El Mimo"	Luis Redón "Louie
Eric Prats	Pivi
Gaby Carrillo	Miriam Medina
Luis Bayardo	Virgilio Valencia
Miranda Cid	Blanquita Valencia
Arturo Vázquez	Renato
Mario Sauret	Comandante Rodríguez
Eduardo de la Garza Castro	Sebastián
Helena Guerrero	Florencia
Norma Lazareno	María Teresa Lascurain
Mario Casillas	El señor del maletín
Marisol Santacruz	Alicia Palacio Robles
Alejandro Peniche	Rogelio Sansores Perez

== Mexico broadcast ==
On June 17, 2013, Canal de las Estrellas started broadcasting Libre para amarte weeknights at 8:25pm, replacing Porque el amor manda. The last episode was broadcast on November 10, with Qué pobres tan ricos replacing it the following day. Production of Libre para amarte officially started on March 22, 2013.

Season	Timeslot (ET/PT)	No. of episodes	Premiered		Ended	
Season	Timeslot (ET/PT)	No. of episodes	Date	Premiere Ratings	Date	Finale Ratings
2013	Monday to Friday 8:20PM	106	June 17, 2013	23.3	November 10, 2013	19.3

== Awards and nominations ==
Year	Award	Category	Nominated	Result
2014	Premios TVyNovelas			
2014	Premios TVyNovelas	Best First actor	Jesús Ochoa	Won
2014	Favoritos del publico			
2014	Favoritos del publico	The Sexiest	Gabriel Soto	Nominated
2014	Favoritos del publico	Best Villain	Harry Geithner	Nominated
2014	Favoritos del publico	Favorite Couple	Gloria Trevi y Gabriel Soto	Nominated
