= Gloria Trevi =

Mexican singer-songwriter, actress

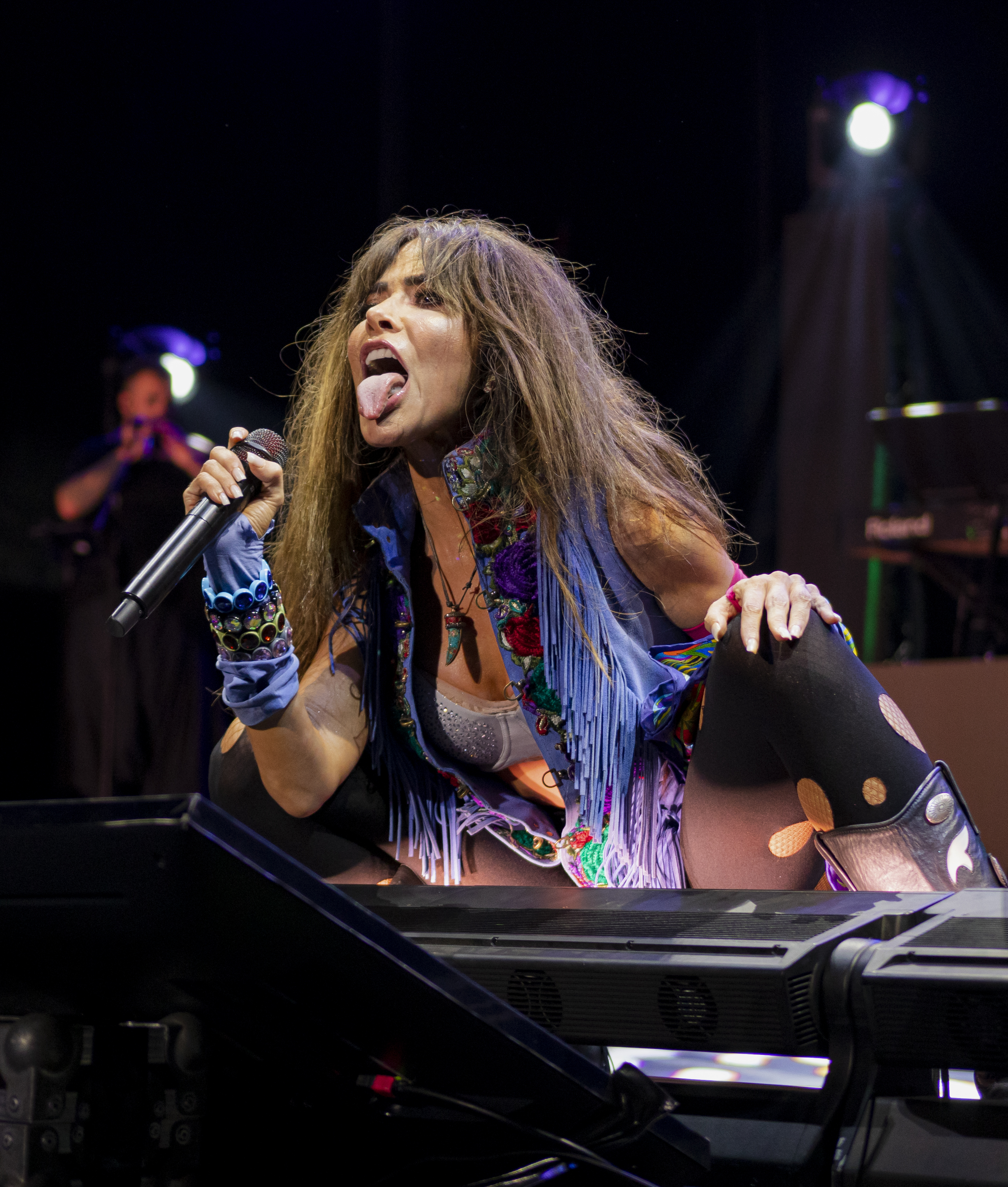
- Trevi in 2022
- Born: Gloria de los Ángeles Treviño Ruiz; 15 February 1968 (age 58); Monterrey, Nuevo León, Mexico
- Other names: La Trevi; Gloria Treviño
- Occupations: Singer; songwriter; actress
- Years active: 1985–present
- Notable work: Discography; songs
- Spouse: Armando Goméz (m. 2009)
- Children: 3
- Musical career
- Genres: Latin pop; pop rock
- Instruments: Vocals; piano
- Labels: BMG; Univision; Universal Latino; Great Talent
- Website: www.gloriatreviweb.com

Gloria de los Ángeles Treviño Ruiz (born 15 February 1968), known professionally as Gloria Trevi, is a Mexican singer-songwriter. She is one of the best-selling Latin music artists in history, having sold over 20 million records worldwide. (Note: Multiple sources claim over 20 million records sold worldwide. Some sources estimate sales as high as 30 million.) Trevi is known for her emotional lyrics, performances, and lasting influence on Latin music, being dubbed the "Mexican Queen of Pop" by Rolling Stone. She is also known for the media coverage surrounding the Trevi–Andrade scandal, involving sexual abuse and forced labour led by her former manager-producer Sergio Andrade.

At 15, she moved to Mexico City to study performing arts at Televisa's CEA. In 1984, she met record producer Sergio Andrade, who added her to his girl group project Boquitas Pintadas, which disbanded after one unsuccessful album the same year. Trevi later tracked down Andrade and recorded a demo in Los Angeles, which led to her debut album ¿Qué Hago Aquí? (1989), containing her breakthrough single "Dr. Psiquiatra" that rose her to fame. In the 1990s, Trevi released the albums—Tu Ángel de la Guarda (1991), Me Siento Tan Sola (1992), Más Turbada Que Nunca (1994), and Si Me Llevas Contigo (1995)—featuring hits like "Pelo Suelto", "Zapatos Viejos", and "Con los Ojos Cerrados", cementing her status as a sex symbol and pop icon and bringing her international fame. In 1997, Trevi retired from public life with Andrade.

During this period, a complaint against her, Sergio Andrade, and other women was filed in Chihuahua involving allegations of sexual abuse, corruption of minors, and forced labor, following the disappearance of 17-year-old Karina Yapor and other young women. In January 2000, they were arrested in Rio de Janeiro. She spent nearly five years in pre-trial detention, first in Brazil and then following her extradition to Mexico. Finally, in 2004, Trevi and two other women were tried and acquitted, while Andrade was convicted. Her life and career have been dramatised in the 2014 biopic Gloria and the 2023 TV series Gloria Trevi: Ellas soy yo.

Trevi resumed her career with four number-one albums on the Billboard Top Latin Albums chart, including Gloria (2011) and El Amor (2015). She also scored success with singles such as "Todos Me Miran", "Cinco Minutos", and "No Querías Lastimarme". In 2016, she received the BMI Latin President's Award, and in 2018 she was inducted into the Latin Songwriters Hall of Fame. Recognised as one of the top Latin touring acts of the 21st century, Billboard named her one of the best female Latin pop stars of all time and received the Legend Award at the Hispanic Heritage Awards in 2025.

== Early life ==
Born in Monterrey, Nuevo León, Mexico, Gloria Trevi left Monterrey for Mexico City to pursue her music career. As a child, she developed an interest in American and British rock music artists, such as Led Zeppelin, The Doors, and Janis Joplin.

== Career ==
=== 1985–1995: Early success and initial breakout ===
In 1985, Trevi became a member of a short-lived girl group named Boquitas Pintadas. After the group broke up in 1988, she approached Sergio Andrade for the production of her first solo album, ¿Qué Hago Aquí? (What Am I Doing Here?), which was released in 1989 and scored a number one hit across Latin America, "Dr. Psiquiatra". Trevi was often dubbed as the Madonna of Mexico.

In 1991, Trevi released her second album, Tu Ángel de la Guarda (Your Guardian Angel), which is widely regarded as one of her best albums. "Pelo Suelto", the lead single from the album, was a worldwide success, reaching number 1 in several Latin America countries and in Spain. Billboard magazine included Tu Angel de la Guarda in their list of greatest Latin albums of all time. Her third album, Me Siento Tan Sola (I Feel So Alone), was released in 1992 garnering another hit, "Zapatos Viejos". Trevi starred in the film of the same name in 1993. In 1994, she released two singles, "El Recuento De Los Daños" and "La Papa Sin Catsup", from her fourth studio album Más Turbada Que Nunca (More Turbulent than Ever). Both singles reigned the Billboard Top Latin Albums. In December 1995, Trevi released her final studio album of the decade, and her final album produced by Andrade, Si Me Llevas Contigo (If You Take Me with You). The album produced two moderate hits, "Ella Que Nunca Fue Ella" ("She Who Never Was Herself") and "Si Me Llevas Contigo" ("If You Take Me with You"). On 13 March 1996, Trevi announced that she would retire to care for Andrade during his cancer battle. She offered her last two concerts at the National Auditorium, 16 and 17 March.

=== 2004–2014: Post-arrest career and continued success ===
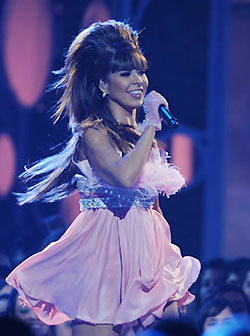
Gloria Trevi at the Premios Juventud 2008

Following her release from four years in prison in Brazil and Mexico on suspicion of human trafficking, Trevi released her sixth studio album, Como Nace el Universo ("How the Universe Is Born"). The album was preceded by the moderate hit "En el Medio de la Tempestad" ("In the Midst of the Storm"). While her sixth record was well-received as her comeback, her seventh studio album Una Rosa Blu was a massive critical and commercial success. Released in 2007, the album produced several successful singles included "Psicofonia, Pruebamelo" ("Prove it to Me"), "El Favor de la Soledad" ("The Favour of Solitude"), "Cinco Minutos" ("Five Minutes"), and "Todos Me Miran" ("Everyone Looks at Me"). During award season, Trevi won Female Artist of the Year at the coveted Premio Lo Nuestro and Female Airplay Song of the Year for "Cinco Minutos" at the Billboard Music Awards. Producer Sergio George earned a nomination at the Latin Grammy for producer of the year for his work on Una Rosa Blu In 2010, Trevi released her eighth, self-titled studio album Gloria. The album included the successful singles "Vestida de Azucar" ("Dressed in Sugar"), "Fuego con Fuego" ("Fire with Fire"), "Me Rio de Ti" ("I Laugh at You"), "La Noche" ("The Night"), and "Esa Hembra es Mala" ("That Female is Evil"). The latter was used as the theme song for the telenovela Teresa.

In 2013, Trevi released her tenth studio album De Pelicula. The album produced the single "No Querias Lastimarme" ("You Didn't Want to Hurt Me"), which was a critical and massive success. The song reached the top ten of the Latin Billboard charts and topped the charts of several Latin American countries. In 2015, Trevi embarked on a new passion project, which would become her eleventh studio album, El Amor. The concept album included covers of popular Latin American love ballads, including previous songs from Trevi's catalog as well as original work. Trevi had two alter-egos for the album, Mr. Trevi and Mrs. Gloria. The album debuted at the top of the Billboard charts and produced two successful singles, "Como Yo Te Amo" ("How I Love You") and "Las Pequeñas Cosas" ("The Little Things"). In 2017, Trevi collaborated with fellow Mexican artist Alejandra Guzmán for the album Versus. The album included two singles, "Cuando un Hombre te Enamora" and "Mas Buena". The two singers embarked on the Versus World Tour during summer and fall 2017.

=== 2015–2018: Love and Versus ===
Love is the tenth studio album published on 21 August 2015 and produced by Humberto Gatica, the material has 14 songs; 12 of them classics by artists such as Amanda Miguel, Raphael and Roberto Carlos, in addition to the unreleased songs: Inmortal and Without fear of anything; Its presentation was in a standard and deluxe version accompanied by a DVD with the videos of the 12 classics. The first single Como yo te amo, a version by the Spanish singer Raphael, was published on 19 June of that year. On the same day as the album's worldwide release, his tour called El amor world tour also began at the Greek Theater in Los Angeles. The album debuted at the top of sales on Billboard in the United States. On 21 August 2015, his El Amor World Tour begins at the Greek Theater in the city of Los Angeles. The tour was presented in the United States, Spain, Peru, Chile and the rest of Latin America. During 2016 the tour toured much of Mexico and recorded their third live album, Inmortal.

After the conclusion of the concerts, he joined Alejandra Guzmán for the release of the collaborative album Versus being Gloria's eleventh studio album. The album had 10 songs and consists of a Versus where the artists join forces on a tour that bears the same name. On 5 May 2017 they released a single called When a man falls in love with you, and on 25 May they released the second single called Más buena. The Versus World Tour in the city of Los Angeles, the first concert was on 3 June 2017 at the Staples Center, performing throughout the United States, and in cities in Mexico, South America and performing for the first time in Canada. The live album of the Versus World Tour was released on 17 November 2017, was recorded on 23 June of the same year at the Arena Ciudad de México. The tour ended on 14 April 2018 at the Hollywood Bowl.

== Personal life ==
Trevi married Armando Gómez, a lawyer, in 2009. She now lives in McAllen, Texas, with Gómez and her two sons. Trevi received the BMI President's Award on 2 March 2016, at the 23rd BMI Latin Awards for her impact on Latin pop.

== Child abuse allegations ==
In 2000, Trevi was arrested in Rio de Janeiro, Brazil, on charges of corrupting minors. Trevi's longtime manager, Sergio Andrade Sanchez, was accused of forcing sex on young girls who were among his teenage protégées.

A year later, while in prison, Trevi announced that she was pregnant. The father was Andrade, according to DNA tests by Brazilian authorities; Trevi and her defense claimed that the results of the DNA test had been fabricated. Trevi was cleared of the charges in 2004 due to lack of evidence after spending four years and eight months in prison in Brazil and Mexico.

In December 2023, Trevi sued Andrade for sexual abuse. In 2022, Trevi and Andrade were once again sued by two women, this time in the United States, who accused the duo of recruiting underage girls for a music training program, in which the girls were allegedly raped, beaten, starved and prevented from seeing family and friends. In 2023, two more women joined the suit against Trevi and Andrade. The status of the legal cases is ongoing.

== Discography ==
- ¿Qué Hago Aquí? (1989)
- Tu Ángel de la Guarda (1991)
- Me Siento Tan Sola (1992)
- Más Turbada Que Nunca (1994)
- Si Me Llevas Contigo (1995)
- Cómo Nace el Universo (2004)
- Una Rosa Blu (2007)
- Gloria (2011)
- De Película (2013)
- El Amor (2015)
- Versus (with Alejandra Guzmán) (2017)
- Diosa de la Noche (2019)
- Isla Divina (2022)
- Mi Soundtrack Vol. 1 (2023)
- Mi Soundtrack Vol. 2 (2023)
- Mi Soundtrack Vol. 3 (2024)
- El Vuelo (2025)

== Tours ==
- Trevolución (2005–2006)
- Una Rosa Blu Tour (2009–2010)
- Gloria Tour (2011–2012)
- Agárrate Tour (2013–2014)
- De Película Tour (2014–2015)
- El Amor Tour (2015–2016)
- Versus Tour – with Alejandra Guzmán (2017–2018)
- Diosa de la Noche Tour – with Karol G (2019–2020)
- Isla Divina World Tour (2022–2023)
- Mi Soundtrack World Tour (2024)

== Filmography ==
Films
Year	Title	Role	Notes
1991	Pelo suelto	Herself	Film debut
1993	Zapatos viejos	Herself	
1995	Una papa sin catsup	Gloria / La Greñas	
2008	Las mamás sí van al cielo	Herself	Television film

Television
Year	Title	Role	Notes
1993	Mundos Atrevidos	Herself	TV Special
1997	XE-TU Remix	Herself	Host
2011	Pequeños gigantes	Herself	Co-hostess
2013	Libre para amarte	Aurora Valencia	Lead role; 107 episodes
2022	Drag Race España (season 2)	Herself	Guest Judge; Episode 1
2023	Gloria Trevi: Ellas soy yo	Herself	Host; Lead role; 6 episodes
2025	Velvet: El nuevo imperio	Herself	Guest star

Songs for soap operas
Year	Telenovela	Song	Episode / Notes
2006	Sos mi vida	"Doctor psiquiatra"	Chapter 108
2008	Valeria	"Valeria"	Main theme
2009	Mujeres Asesinas	"Que Emane"	Main theme (Season 2)
2010	Teresa	"Esa hembra es mala"	Main theme
2013	Libre para amarte	"No soy un pájaro"	Main theme
2015	¿Quién mató a Patricia Soler?	"No querías lastimarme"	Main theme
2024	Las Hijas de la Señora García	"Cueste Lo Que Cueste"	Main theme

Music videos
Year	Title	Album	Director
1989	Dr. Psiquiatra	¿Qué Hago Aquí?	Sergio Andrade
1989	¿Qué Voy A Hacer Sin Él?	¿Qué Hago Aquí?	Sergio Andrade
1991	Pelo Suelto	Tu Ángel De La Guarda	Sergio Andrade
1991	Tu Ángel De La Guarda	Tu Ángel De La Guarda	Sergio Andrade
1992	Con Los Ojos Cerrados	Me Siento Tan Sola	Sergio Andrade
1992	Zapatos Viejos	Me Siento Tan Sola	Sergio Andrade
1993	Jack El Reprobador	Tu Ángel De La Guarda	Juan A. Williams
1993	Hoy Me Iré De Casa	Tu Ángel De La Guarda	Juan A. Williams
1993	Agárrate	Tu Ángel De La Guarda	Juan A. Williams
1993	Me Siento Tan Sola	Me Siento Tan Sola	Juan A. Williams
1993	Zapatos Viejos	Me Siento Tan Sola	Juan A. Williams
1993	La Acera De Enfrente	Me Siento Tan Sola	Juan A. Williams
1993	Los Borregos	Me Siento Tan Sola	Juan A. Williams
1994	La Papa Sin Catsup	Más Turbada Que Nunca	Sergio Andrade
1994	El Recuento De Los Daños	Más Turbada Que Nunca	Sergio Andrade
2004	En Medio De La Tempestad	Como Nace El Universo	Alejandro Lozano
2006	Todos Me Miran	La Trayectoria	Gloria Trevi & Paco Guerrero
2006	Estrella De La Mañana	La Trayectoria	Gloria Trevi
2006	Sufran Con Lo Que Yo Gozo	La Trayectoria	Gloria Trevi
2007	Psicofonía	Una Rosa Blu	Gloria Trevi
2008	Cinco Minutos	Una Rosa Blu	Gloria Trevi
2008	Cinco Minutos (Duranguense Version) (ft. Los Horoscopos de Durango)	Una Rosa Blu	Gloria Trevi
2008	Psicofonía (Extended Video Remix)	Una Rosa Blu	
2008	Pruebamelo	Una Rosa Blu	Pedro Torres
2009	En Favor De La Soledad	Una Rosa Blu	Michel Castro
2009	Lo Que Una Chica Por Amor Es Capaz	Una Rosa Blu	Nico Tronic
2009	Que Emane	6 Super Hits	¿?
2011	Me Río De Ti	Gloria	Gustavo Garzón
2011	Vestida De Azucar	Gloria	Gustavo Garzón
2011	La Noche	Gloria	Gloria Trevi
2013	No Querías Lastimarme	De Película	Gustavo Garzón
2014	Habla Blah Blah (ft. Shy Carter)	De Película	Nico Tronic
2014	20 Segundos	Non-album single	
2015	Como Yo Te Amo	El Amor	Gloria Trevi
2015	El Amor	El Amor	Gloria Trevi
2015	Perdóname	El Amor	Gloria Trevi
2015	Cama Y Mesa	El Amor	Gloria Trevi
2015	Tu y Yo	El Amor	Gloria Trevi
2015	Te Quiero	El Amor	Gloria Trevi
2015	Y Ahora Quien	El Amor	Gloria Trevi
2015	El Amor Después Del Amor	El Amor	Gloria Trevi
2015	Las Pequeñas Cosas	El Amor	Gloria Trevi
2015	Desahogo	El Amor	Gloria Trevi
2015	Que Muera El Amor	El Amor	Gloria Trevi
2015	Como Si Fuera La Primera	El Amor	Gloria Trevi
2017	Cuando Un Hombre Te Enamora	Versus (with Alejandra Guzmán)	Gloria Trevi
2017	Más Buena	Versus (with Alejandra Guzmán)	Gloria Trevi
2019	Rómpeme El Corazón	Diosa De La Noche	Gloria Trevi
2019	Que Me Duela	Diosa De La Noche	Gloria Trevi
2019	Yo Soy Su Vida	Diosa De La Noche	Gloria Trevi
2019	Me Lloras	Diosa De La Noche	Gloria Trevi
2019	Vas A Recordarme	Diosa De La Noche	Gloria Trevi
2019	Ellas Soy Yo	Diosa De La Noche	Gloria Trevi
2019	Hijoep*# (ft. Karol G)	Diosa De La Noche	Gloria Trevi
2019	Ábranse Perras	Diosa De La Noche	Gloria Trevi
2020	Grande	Isla Divina	Gloria Trevi
2020	Demasiado Frágiles	Isla Divina	Pablo Croce
2021	Ensayando Cómo Pedirte Perdón	Isla Divina	Pablo Croce
2021	Nos Volvimos Locos (ft. Guaynaa)	Isla Divina	Pablo Croce
2022	Él Se Equivocó	Isla Divina	Pablo Croce
2022	La Recaída (ft. Timo Nuñez)	Isla Divina	Pablo Croce
2023	Medusa	Non-album single	Pablo Croce
2023	Inocente	Non-album single	Pablo Croce
2023	Que Se Acabe El Mundo	Mi Soundtrack Vol. 1	Pablo Croce
2023	Siempre Yo (2023 Version)	Mi Soundtrack Vol. 2	Gloria Trevi
2024	Celos	Non-album single	Gloria Trevi
2024	Zona de Riesgo (ft. Carlos Rivera)	Non-album single	Pablo Croce
2024	Sangre Caliente	Isla Divina	Pablo Croce
2024	Tu Regalo Soy Yo	Tu Regalo Soy Yo (EP)	Nico Tronic & Mauri CandyBoy
2024	Cueste Lo Que Cueste	El Vuelo	Pablo Croce
2024	Cobardía	El Vuelo	Pablo Croce
2025	Q.E.P.D	El Vuelo	Pablo Croce
2025	El Vuelo	El Vuelo	Pablo Croce
