= La Más Draga: Solo Las Más season 1 =

First season of 'La Más Draga'

La Más Draga: Solo Las Más
- Season 1
- Promotional poster for season one
- Hosted by: Lorena Herrera; Vanessa Claudio; Karla Díaz-Leal Arreguín; Roberto Carlo Alanís Almaguer; Maca Carriedo; Marisol González
- Judges: Alfonso Waithsman; Lola Cortés; Luis Torres
- No. of contestants: 8
- Winner: C-Pher
- Runners-up: Georgiana; Madison Basrey; Sirena
- No. of episodes: 8

Release
- Original network: YouTube
- Original release: 19 March – 7 May 2024

Season chronology
- Next → Season 2

The first season of La Más Draga: Solo Las Más aired on 19 March 2024, available through YouTube, and was produced by La Gran Diabla Producciones. The series featured eight contestants, including seven from previous seasons of La Más Draga, competing for the title of La Más Draga of Mexico and Latin America and a cash prize of $1,000,000 MXN Pesos.

The judges panel of this season include a main host, a different one for each episode, celebrity make-up artist Alfonso Waithsman, singer and actress Lola Cortés and make-up artist Luis Torres.

The series, unlike the original one, featured a new format twist: throughout the season, no one was eliminated. Instead, each week, the contestants competed to earn the most number of stars. In the finale, the four queens with the most stars participated in the Grand Finale to determine the winner. Before the finale all the queens participated in a parallel Lip Sync Smackdown, named La Revencha Tournament, for a cash prize of $100,000 MXN Pesos and the title of "Máxima de la Revancha".

C-Pher won the season, with Georgiana, Madison Basrey and Sirena as runners-up. Gvajardo won the "Máxima de la Revancha" title, while Velvetine was named "La Más Querida".

== Contestants ==
Ages, names, and cities stated are at time of filming.

Contestants of La Más Draga: Solo Las Más season 1 and their backgrounds
Contestant	Age	Hometown	Original season	Original placement	Outcome
C-Pher	31	Santiago, Chile	Season 4	Runner-up	Winner
Georgiana (Note: Georgiana Vagina is referred to as Georgiana on the show.)	33	Monterrey, Nuevo León	Season 4	8th place (Note: The contestant was voted La Más Querida on her original season.)	Runners-up
Madison Basrey (Note: Now known as Madison Basrey, she was referred to as Madison on La Más Draga season 3.)	33	Guadalajara, Jalisco	Season 3	Runner-up	Runners-up
Sirena	32	Guadalajara, Jalisco	Season 4	12th place	Runners-up
Soro Nasty	33	Monterrey, Nuevo León	Season 2	5th place	5th place
Rudy Reyes	30	Monterrey, Nuevo León	Season 3	Runner-up	6th place
Velvetine	32	Monterrey, Nuevo León	—N/a (Note: Velvetine has never previously competed on a La Más Draga franchise.)		7th place (Note: Velvetine placed eighth before re-entering the competition. She was later voted La Más Querida.)
Gvajardo	31	Monterrey, Nuevo León	Season 2	Runner-up	8th place (Note: Gvajardo won the title Máxima de la Revancha.)

== Contestant progress ==
Legend:

C-Pher won La Más Draga: Solo Las Más season 1.
Georgiana, Madison Basrey and Sirena were the runners-up.
Velvetine was voted was voted La Más Querida (LMQ).
Gvajardo was declared Máxima de la Revancha (MDR) after winning the Revencha Tournament.
WIN indicates the contestant received the highest score and won the challenge.
CW indicates the contestant was the challenge winner, but did not win the runway challenge of the episode.
RW (Runway winner) indicates that the contestant was the runway winner of the episode.
TOP indicates that the contestant was one of the best, but did not win the main challenge.
SAFE indicates that the contestant was declared safe.
BTM (Bottom) indicates that the contestant received one of the lowest scores and was up for the lip sync.
NOM (Nominated) indicates that the contestant was placed in the bottom and finished the episode as nominated to participate at the lip sync the next episode.
TNM (Top contestant nominated) indicates that the contestant was one of the best, but did not win the main challenge, was placed in the bottom and finished the episode as nominated to participate at the lip sync the next episode.
ELIM (Eliminated) indicates that the contestant was previously nominated, lost the lip sync and was eliminated.
OUT indicates that the contestant lost the chance of returning to the competition.
REV indicates that the contestant participated in the Revencha Tournament, won at least one of the lip syncs and made her a candidate for the title of Máxima de la Revancha.
LOSS indicates that the contestant participated in the Revencha Tournament, but lost one of the lip syncs.
Guest indicates that the contestant returned as a guest.

Progress of contestants including placements in each episode
Contestant	Episode						Points (Note: The final count of the points was made at the end of episode 6.)	Episode	
Contestant	1	2	3	4	5	6	Points	7	8
C-Pher	WIN	TOP	SAFE	RW	NOM	WIN	19	REV	Winner
Georgiana	SAFE	SAFE	BTM	CW	SAFE	SAFE	12	LOSS	Runner-up
Madison Basrey	TOP	BTM	SAFE	SAFE	TOP	SAFE	12	REV	Runner-up
Sirena	SAFE	WIN	WIN	SAFE	SAFE	BTM	18	LOSS	Runner-up
Soro Nasty	SAFE	SAFE	TOP	TNM	WIN	SAFE	10	LOSS	Guest
Rudy Reyes	SAFE	SAFE	TOP	SAFE	SAFE	TNM	2	REV	Guest
Velvetine	NOM	ELIM	OUT	TOP	BTM	SAFE	-1	REV	LMQ
Gvajardo	SAFE	SAFE	NOM	BTM	SAFE	SAFE	-2	REV	MDR

=== Scores history ===
Legend:

The contestant received a Golden Star during the episode, adding six points to their scoreboard.
The contestant received a Pink Star during the episode, adding three points to their scoreboard.
The contestant received a Black Star during the episode, reducing their scoreboard by two points.
The contestant received two Black Stars during the episode, reducing their scoreboard by four points.

Summary of the stars collection
Contestant	Episode						Points	Result
Contestant	1	2	3	4	5	6	Points	Result
C-Pher	+6	+3	—	+6	-2	+6	19	ADV
Sirena	—	+6	+6	—	—	+6	18	ADV
Georgiana	—	—	+6	+6	—	—	12	ADV
Madison	+3	—	—	—	+9	—	12	ADV
Soro	—	—	+3	+1	+6	—	10	ELIM
Rudy	—	—	+3	—	—	-1	2	ELIM
Velvetine	-2	-2	—	+3	—	—	-1	ELIM
Gvajardo	—	—	-2	—	—	—	-2	ELIM

== Lip syncs ==
Legend:

The contestant was not eliminated and simply remained nominated the following week.
The contestant was eliminated due to them already having a Black Star from a previous episode.
The contestant was not immediately eliminated but received two Black Stars as punishment.
The contestant won their Lip-Sync in the Revencha Tournament.

Episode	Bottom contestants			Song	Eliminated
2	Madison Basrey	vs.	Velvetine	"El coco no" (Roberto Junior y su Bandeño)	Velvetine
Episode	Bottom contestants			Song	Loser
3	Georgiana	vs.	Gvajardo	"Sexi Dance" (Paulina Rubio)	Gvajardo
4	Gvajardo	vs.	Soro Nasty	"Si una vez" (Selena)	Soro Nasty
5	C-Pher	vs.	Velvetine	"Déjame vivir" (Rocío Dúrcal, Juan Gabriel)	C-Pher
6 (Note: Due to a tie in the number of stars between Georgiana and Madison Basrey, the two contestants were called upon to perform a lip sync to determine the last finalist; however, after the judges failed to reach a unanimous verdict, both of them were declared as the winners and were both declared finalists.)	Rudy Reyes	vs.	Sirena	"¿A quién le importa?" (Thalía)	Rudy Reyes
6	Tie-break contestants			Song	Eliminated
6	Georgiana	vs.	Madison Basrey	"Todos me miran" (Gloria Trevi)	None
Episode	Tournament contestants			Song	Winner
7	Madison Basrey	vs.	Velvetine	"El coco no" (Roberto Junior y su Bandeño)	Velvetine
7	Georgiana	vs.	Gvajardo	"Sexi Dance" (Paulina Rubio)	None
7	Gvajardo	vs.	Soro Nasty	"Si una vez" (Selena)	Gvajardo
7	C-Pher	vs.	Velvetine	"Déjame vivir" (Rocío Dúrcal, Juan Gabriel)	C-Pher
7	C-Pher	vs.	Velvetine	"Déjame vivir" (Rocío Dúrcal, Juan Gabriel)	Velvetine
7	Rudy Reyes	vs.	Sirena	"¿A quién le importa?" (Thalía)	Rudy Reyes
7	Georgiana	vs.	Madison Basrey	"Todos me miran" (Gloria Trevi)	Madison Basrey

== Judges ==
=== Main judges ===
- Alfonso Waithsman, celebrity make-up artist
- Lola Cortés, singer and actress
- Luis Torres, make-up artist and entrepreneur

=== Guest judges ===
- Bernardo "Letal" Vázquez, drag queen and professional makeup artist (episode 6)

=== Special guests ===
Guests who will appear in episodes, but not judge on the main stage.

==== Episode 2 and 3 ====
- Johnny Carmona, TV personality and main coach on La Más Draga

==== Episode 4 ====
- Yeyo Maldonado, dancer and choreographer

==== Episode 7 ====
- Deborah La Grande, winner of La Más Draga season 1

==== Episode 8 ====
- Wendy Guevara, influencer, actress, singer and businesswoman
- Johnny Carmona, TV personality and main coach on La Más Draga
- Yari Mejía, designer, stylist, singer, model and main judge on La Más Draga
- Raquel Martínez, actress, dancer and main judge on La Más Draga
- Samantha Flores, LGBT+ and Transgender rights activist

== Episodes ==
No. overall	No. in season	Title	Original release date
1	1	"La Más Alebrije"	19 March 2024
Seven all-stars and one new queen enter the workroom. The new format for the season is introduced. Throughout the season, no one will be eliminated. Instead, the queens compete to earn stars. A Gold Star is worth 6 points, a Pink Star is worth 3 points, and a Black Star is worth -2 points. Each week, the winner of the challenge will receive 1 Gold Star, while the second best of each challenge will receive 1 Pink Star. The queens will then vote in The Purgatory, to decide which queens will be in the bottom for the week. The winner of the lip-sync will become safe. While the loser of the lip-sync will receive 1 Black Star, and remain nominated for the next week. If a queen receives 2 Black Stars, they will be eliminated from the competition. If a queen does get eliminated, they can return to the competition by receiving a Gold Star or a Pink Star. Throughout the season, the queens may earn stars through mini-challenges, or lip-syncs. After the semifinals, the four queens with the most Star points, will compete in the grand finale, while the other four queens will be eliminated. For the first main challenge, the queens perform in a talent show.: C-Pher - Original song; Georgiana - Original song; Gvajardo - Lip-syncing; Madison Basrey - Lip-syncing/comedy performance; Rudy Reyes - Original song/dancing; Sirena - Lip-syncing; Soro Nasty - Original song; Velvetine - Original song/comedy performance; On the runway, category is La Más Alebrije (The Most Alebrije). C-Pher is announced as the winner of the challenge, and receives a Gold Star. Madison Basrey is announced as the second best in the challenge, and receives a Pink Star. After The Purgatory voting, it is announced that Velvetine received the most votes. Velvetine received a Black Star and will be nominated to compete in the lip-sync in the next episode.: Host: Lorena Herrera; Main Challenge: Perform in a talent show; Runway Theme: La Más Alebrije (The Most Alebrije); Challenge Winner: C-Pher; Challenge Prize: A $10,000 cash tip and a Gold Star; Second Best: Madison Basrey; Second Best Prize: A $5,000 cash tip and a Pink Star; Nominated: Velvetine
2	2	"La Más Religiosa"	16 March 2024
For this week's main challenge, the queens present a look inspired by the Christian Catholic faith in Mexico. On the runway, category is La Más Religiosa (The Most Religious). Sirena is announced as the winner of the challenge, and receives a Gold Star. C-Pher is announced as the second best in the challenge, and receives a Pink Star. After The Purgatory voting, it is announced that Madison Basrey received the most votes, and will lip-sync against the previously nominated queen, Velvetine. Madison Basrey and Velvetine lip-sync to "El coco no" by Roberto Junior y su Bandeño. Madison Basrey wins the lip-sync. Velvetine loses the lip-sync and receives her second Black Star, and is subsequently eliminated from the competition.: Host: Vanessa Claudio; Main Challenge: Present a look inspired by the Christian Catholic faith in Mexico; Runway Theme: La Más Religiosa (The Most Religious); Challenge Winner: Sirena; Challenge Prize: A $10,000 cash tip and a Gold Star; Second Best: C-Pher; Second Best Prize: A $5,000 cash tip and a Pink Star; Bottom Two: Madison Basrey and Velvetine; Lip-Sync Song: "El coco no" by Roberto Junior y su Bandeño; Eliminated: Velvetine
3	3	"La Más Suertuda"	2 April 2024
For this week's mini-challenge, the queens race through an obstacle course. C-Pher, Georgiana and Rudy Reyes win the mini-challenge. Georgiana randomly receives a Gold Star for winning. For the main challenge, the queens present a look inspired by the traditional Mexican Lotería.: C-Pher - El Violoncello (The Cello); Georgiana - La Mano (The Hand); Gvajardo - La Dama (The Lady) and El Catrín (The Dandy); Madison Basrey - El Violoncello (The Cello); Rudy Reyes - El Soldado (The Soldier); Sirena - El Alacrán (The Scorpion); Soro Nasty - La Luna (The Moon) and La Estrella (The Star); Velvetine - La Rosa (The Rose); On the runway, category is La Más Suertuda (The Most Lucky). Sirena is announced as the winner of the challenge, and receives a Gold Star. Rudy Reyes and Soro Nasty are announced as the second best in the challenge, and both receive a Pink Star. After The Purgatory voting, it is announced that Gvajardo received the most votes. It is announced that due to Madison Basrey winning last week's lip-sync, she will decide who will face Gvajardo in the lip-sync. Madison Basrey chose Georgiana. Georgiana and Gvajardo lip-sync to "Sexi Dance" by Paulina Rubio. Georgiana wins the lip-sync. Gvajardo loses the lip-sync, receives a Black Star and will be nominated to compete in the lip-sync in the next episode.: Host: Karla Díaz-Leal Arreguín; Mini-Challenge: Race through an obstacle course; Mini-Challenge Winners: C-Pher, Georgiana and Rudy Reyes; Mini-Challenge Prize: Respectively, a $500 cash tip, a Gold Star and a $5,000 cash tip; Main Challenge: Present a look inspired by the traditional Mexican Lotería; Runway Theme: La Más Suertuda (The Most Lucky); Challenge Winner: Sirena; Challenge Prize: A $10,000 cash tip and a Gold Star; Second Best: Rudy Reyes and Soro Nasty; Second Best Prize: A $5,000 cash tip and a Pink Star; Bottom Two: Georgiana and Gvajardo; Lip-Sync Song: "Sexi Dance" by Paulina Rubio; Nominated: Gvajardo
4	4	"La Más Pintada"	9 April 2024
For this week's main challenge, the queens record vocals and perform in "La Más Thalía", a musical inspired by Mexican singer Thalía. On the runway, category is La Más Pintada (The Most Painted). Georgiana is announced as the winner of the main challenge, and receives a Gold Star. Velvetine is announced as the second best in the challenge, and receives a Pink Star. Velvetine officially returns to the competition. C-Pher is announced as the winner of the runway challenge, and receives a Gold Star. Soro Nasty is announced as the second best in the runway challenge, and receives a Pink Star. After The Purgatory voting, it is announced that Soro Nasty received the most votes, and will lip-sync against the previously nominated queen, Gvajardo. Gvajardo and Soro Nasty lip-sync to "Si una vez" by Selena. Gvajardo wins the lip-sync. Soro Nasty loses the lip-sync, receives a Black Star and will be nominated to compete in the lip-sync in the next episode.: Host: Roberto Carlo Alanís Almaguer; Main Challenge: Record vocals and perform in "La Más Thalía", a musical inspired by Mexican singer Thalía; Challenge Winner: Georgiana; Challenge Prize: A $10,000 cash tip and a Gold Star; Challenge Second Best: Velvetine; Challenge Second Best Prize: A $5,000 cash tip and a Pink Star; Returned: Velvetine; Runway Theme: La Más Pintada (The Most Painted); Runway Winner: C-Pher; Runway Prize: A $10,000 cash tip and a Gold Star; Runway Second Best: Soro Nasty; Runway Second Best Prize: A $5,000 cash tip and a Pink Star; Bottom Two: Gvajardo and Soro Nasty; Lip-Sync Song: "Si una vez" by Selena; Nominated: Soro Nasty
5	5	"La Más del Toro"	16 April 2024
For this week's mini-challenge, the queens participate in a trivia game while having cockroaches thrown at their faces. Madison Basrey, Sirena and Velvetine win the mini-challenge. Madison Basrey randomly receives a Gold Star for winning. For the main challenge, the queens present a look inspired by the works of Mexican filmmaker Guillermo del Toro.: C-Pher - The Book of Life; Georgiana - Blade II; Gvajardo - Pacific Rim; Madison Basrey - Pan's Labyrinth; Rudy Reyes - Pinocchio; Sirena - The Shape of Water; Soro Nasty - Cabinet of Curiosities; Velvetine - Crimson Peak; On the runway, category is La Más del Toro (The Most del Toro). Soro Nasty is announced as the winner of the challenge, and receives a Gold Star. Madison Basrey is announced as the second best in the challenge, and receives a Pink Star. After The Purgatory voting, it is announced that Velvetine received the most votes. It is announced that due to Soro Nasty winning this week's challenge, she will not be nominated to compete in the lip-sync, and will decide who will lip-sync against Velvetine. Soro Nasty chose C-Pher. C-Pher and Velvetine lip-sync to "Déjame vivir" by Rocío Dúrcal and Juan Gabriel. Velvetine wins the lip-sync. C-Pher loses the lip-sync, receives a Black Star and will be nominated to compete in the lip-sync in the next episode.: Host: Maca Carriedo; Mini-Challenge: Participate in a trivia game while having cockroaches thrown at their faces; Mini-Challenge Winners: Madison Basrey, Sirena and Velvetine; Mini-Challenge Prize: Respectively, $5,000 cash tip, a Gold Star, a $500 cash tip, and a $5,000 cash tip; Main Challenge: Present a look inspired by the works of Mexican filmmaker Guillermo del Toro; Runway Theme: La Más del Toro (The Most del Toro); Challenge Winner: Soro Nasty; Challenge Prize: A $10,000 cash tip and a Gold Star; Second Best: Madison Basrey; Second Best Prize: A $5,000 cash tip and a Pink Star; Bottom Two: C-Pher and Velvetine; Lip-Sync Song: "Déjame vivir" by Rocío Dúrcal and Juan Gabriel; Nominated: C-Pher
6	6	"La Muy Máxima"	23 April 2024
For this week's main challenge, the queens present a look that best represents their drag evolution. On the runway, category is La Muy Máxima (The Very Most).C-Pher is announced as the winner of the challenge, and receives a Gold Star. Rudy Reyes is announced as the second best in the challenge, and receives a Pink Star. After The Purgatory voting, it is announced that Sirena received the most votes. It is announced that due to C-Pher winning this week's challenge, she will not be nominated to compete in the lip-sync, and will decide who will lip-sync against Sirena. C-Pher chose Rudy Reyes. Rudy Reyes and Sirena lip-sync to "¿A quién le importa?" by Thalía. Sirena wins the lip-sync and receives a Gold Star. Rudy Reyes loses the lip-sync, receives 2 Black Stars. After the lip-sync, it is announced that C-Pher and Sirena received the most points, and will move on to the finale. Georgiana and Madison Basrey are told they tied in points, and will lip-sync to break the tie. They lip-sync to "Todos me miran" by Gloria Trevi. Both queens win the lip-sync, and both move on to the finale with C-Pher and Sirena. Gvajardo, Rudy Reyes, Soro Nasty and Velvetine are eliminated.: Host: Marisol González; Guest Judge: Letal; Main Challenge Present a look that best represents their drag evolution; Runway Theme: La Muy Máxima (The Very Most); Challenge Winner: C-Pher; Challenge Prize: A $10,000 cash tip and a Gold Star; Second Best: Rudy Reyes; Second Best Prize: A $5,000 cash tip and a Pink Star; Bottom Two: Rudy Reyes and Sirena; Lip-Sync Song: "¿A quién le importa?" by Thalía; Tiebreaker Round: Georgiana and Madison Basrey; Lip-Sync Song: "Todos me miran" by Gloria Trevi; Final Four: C-Pher, Georgiana, Madison Basrey and Sirena; Eliminated: Gvajardo, Rudy Reyes, Soro Nasty and Velvetine
7	7	"La Revancha"	30 April 2024
The queens all return for the reunion. The queens are told they will be competing in a lip-sync tournament, where they will be recreating all of the six lip-sync battles that were performed during the season. The first lip-sync is between Madison Basrey and Velvetine, lip-syncing to "El coco no" by Roberto Junior y su Bandeño. Velvetine wins the lip-sync and Madison Basrey loses. The second lip-sync is between Georgiana and Gvajardo, lip-syncing to "Sexi Dance" by Paulina Rubio. Georgiana and Gvajardo both lose the lip-sync. The third lip-sync is between Gvajardo and Soro Nasty, lip-syncing to "Si una vez" by Selena. Gvajardo wins the lip-sync and Soro Nasty loses. The fourth lip-sync is between C-Pher and Velvetine, lip-syncing to "Déjame vivir" by Rocío Dúrcal and Juan Gabriel. C-Pher and Velvetine both win the lip-sync. The fifth lip-sync is between Rudy Reyes and Sirena, lip-syncing to "¿A quién le importa?" by Thalía. Rudy Reyes wins the lip-sync and Sirena loses. The sixth and final lip-sync is between Georgiana and Madison Basrey, lip-syncing to "Todos me miran" by Gloria Trevi. Madison Basrey wins the lip-sync and Georgiana loses.: Guest Host: Deborah La Grande; Main Challenge: Participate in La Revancha Tournament, recreating all the six lip-sync battles that were performed during the season; Lip-Sync Songs: "El coco no" by Roberto Junior y su Bandeño, "Sexi Dance" by Paulina Rubio, "Si una vez" by Selena, "Déjame vivir" by Rocío Dúrcal and Juan Gabriel, "¿A quién le importa?" by Thalía and "Todos me miran" by Gloria Trevi; Lip-Sync Winners: C-Pher, Gvajardo, Madison Basrey, Rudy Reyes and Velvetine
8	8	"La Gran Final"	7 May 2024
For the final challenge of the season, the queens produce, direct, and star in their own original performance on an original track recorded by themselves as well as presenting a La Más Diosa (The Most Goddess) look. It is revealed that Velvetine is this season's La Más Querida (Miss Congeniality) and Gvajardo is this season's Máxima de la Revancha (The Very Most of the Rematch). It is announced that C-Pher is the winner, leaving Georgiana, Madison Basrey and Sirena as the runners-up.: Guest Host: Wendy Guevara; Main Challenge: Produce, direct, and star in their own original performance on an original track recorded by themselves; Runway Theme: La Más Diosa (The Most Goddess); La Más Querida: Velvetine; Máxima de la Revancha: Gvajardo; Runners-up: Georgiana, Madison Barsey and Sirena; Winner of La Más Draga: Solo Las Más Season One: C-Pher
