= La Más Draga: Solo Las Más season 2 =

Second season of 'La Más Draga'

La Más Draga: Solo Las Más
- Season 2
- Promotional poster for season two
- Hosted by: Galilea Montijo; Vanessa Claudio; Karla Díaz-Leal Arreguín; Roberto Carlo Alanís Almaguer; Maca Carriedo; Marisol González
- Judges: Aldo Rendón; Alfonso Waithsman; Lola Cortés
- No. of contestants: 9
- Winner: La Kyliezz
- Runners-up: Hidden Mistake; Juana Guadalupe; Lupita Kush; Peke Balderas
- No. of episodes: 9

Release
- Original network: YouTube
- Original release: 16 June – 15 August 2026

Season chronology
- ← Previous; Season 1

The second season of La Más Draga: Solo Las Más aired on 16 June 2026, available through YouTube, and was produced by La Gran Diabla Producciones. The series featured nine contestants from previous seasons of La Más Draga, competing for the title of La Más Draga of Mexico and Latin America and a cash prize of $1,000,000 MXN Pesos.

The judges panel of this season include a main host, a different one for each episode, celebrity make-up artist Alfonso Waithsman, singer and actress Lola Cortés and celebrity stylist Aldo Rendón.

As with the previous season, no one was eliminated. Instead, each week, the contestants competed to earn the most number of stars (i.e. Gold, Pink and Black); In addition to the standard ones, a Rainbow Star is also introduced, which allows contestants to swap it for any other star (Gold or Pink) in order to eliminate a Black Star or to avoid a double elimination. If not used before the semi-final, the Rainbow Star automatically turns into 5 Black Stars. In the finale, the four queens with the most stars will participate in the Grand Finale to determine the winner.

La Kyliezz won the season, with Hidden Mistake, Juana Guadalupe, Lupita Kush and Peke Balderas as runners-up. Mista Boo was named "La Más Querida".

== Contestants ==
Ages, names, and cities stated are at time of filming.

Contestants of La Más Draga: Solo Las Más season 2 and their backgrounds
| Contestant | Age | Hometown | Original season | Original placement | Outcome |
|---|---|---|---|---|---|
| La Kyliezz (Note: La Kyliezz Kazzandra Ponce de León is referred to as La Kyliezz on the show.) | 32 | Monterrey, Nuevo León | Season 6 | 5th place (Note: The contestant was voted La Más Querida on her original season.) | Winner |
| Hidden Mistake | 27 | Santiago, Chile | Season 5 | Runner-up (Note: Hidden Mistake originally placed fifth before being asked back to compete in the Grand Finale.) | Runners-up |
| Juana Guadalupe (Note: Juana Guadalupe De Jesús is referred to as Juana Guadalupe on the show.) | 31 | Los Altos de Jalisco, Jalisco | Season 6 | Runner-up | Runners-up |
| Lupita Kush | 26 | Guadalajara, Jalisco | Season 4 | 7th place | Runners-up |
| Peke Balderas | 33 | Monterrey, Nuevo León | Season 5 | 7th place | Runners-up |
| Deseos Fab | 26 | Mexico City | Season 5 | 12th place | 6th place |
| Raga Diamante (Note: Miss Raga Diamante is referred to as Raga Diamante on the show.) | 37 | Mérida, Yucatán | Season 3 | Runner-up | 6th place |
| Regina Bronx | 35 | Aguascalientes, Aguascalientes | Season 3 | 7th place | 8th place |
| Mista Boo | 49 | Monterrey, Nuevo León | Season 3 | 5th place | 9th place (Note: Mista Boo was voted La Más Querida.) |

== Contestant progress ==
Legend:

WIN indicates the contestant received the highest score and won the challenge.
CW indicates the contestant was the challenge winner, but did not win the runway challenge of the episode.
RW (Runway winner) indicates that the contestant was the runway winner.
TCW (Top challenge winner) indicates that the contestant won the challenge and was subsequently the second best on the Runway.
TRW (Top runway winner) indicates that the contestant received the highest score but did not win the challenge; however, she was subsequently declared the Runway Winner.
TOP indicates that the contestant was one of the best, but did not win the main challenge.
SAFE indicates that the contestant was declared safe.
SAVE indicates that the contestant received one of the lowest scores, but did not have to lip sync.
BTM (Bottom) indicates that the contestant received one of the lowest scores and was up for the lip sync.
NOM (Nominated) indicates that the contestant was placed in the bottom and finished the episode as nominated to participate at the lip sync the next episode.
RWN (Runway winner nominated) indicates that the contestant was the runway winner, but was placed in the bottom and finished the episode as nominated to participate at the lip sync the next episode.
Guest indicates that the contestant returned as a guest.

| Contestant | Episode | | | | | | | Points (Note: The final count of the points was made at the end of episode 7.) | Episode | |
| Contestant | 1 | 2 | 3 | 4 | 5 | 6 | 7 | Points | 8 | 9 |
|---|---|---|---|---|---|---|---|---|---|---|
| La Kyliezz | TOP | SAFE | SAFE | CW | WIN | BTM | SAFE | 12 | Guest | Winner |
| Hidden Mistake | TOP | TOP | WIN | SAFE | SAFE | TOP | RW | 15 | Guest | Runner-up |
| Juana Guadalupe | SAFE | SAFE | SAFE | TRW | TOP | SAFE | TOP | 13 | Guest | Runner-up |
| Lupita Kush | BTM | SAFE | TOP | TOP | SAFE | SAFE | CW | 14 | Guest | Runner-up |
| Peke Balderas | SAFE | WIN | SAFE | SAFE | TOP | SAFE | SAFE | 12 | Guest | Runner-up |
| Deseos Fab | SAFE | SAFE | SAFE | TOP | SAFE | NOM | TCW | 10 | Guest | Guest |
| Raga Diamante | NOM | SAVE | BTM | TOP | SAFE | WIN | SAFE | 10 | Guest | Guest |
| Regina Bronx | RWN | NOM | SAVE | BTM | SAFE | SAFE | SAFE | 7 | Guest | Guest |
| Mista Boo | CW | NOM | BTM | NOM | SAFE | SAVE | SAFE | -7 | Guest | LMQ |

=== Scores history ===
Legend:

The contestant received two Golden Star during the episode, adding twelve points to their scoreboard.
The contestant received a Golden Star during the episode, adding five points to their scoreboard.
The contestant received a Pink Star during the episode, adding two points to their scoreboard.
The contestant received a Black Star during the episode, reducing their scoreboard by one point.
The contestant received two Black Stars during the episode, reducing their scoreboard by two points.
The contestant received a Raibow Star during the episode, receiving a bonus which they can use to exchange for the stars earned in a future episode.
The contestant lost points after an opponent used a Rainbow Star to exchange points earned during the episode.

Summary of the stars collection
| Contestant | Episode | | | | | | | | Points (Note: The final count of the points was made at the end of episode 7.) | Result |
| Contestant | 1 | 2 | 3 | 4 | 5 | 6 | 7 (Note: During Episode 7, the queens (as well as the judges) had the opportunity to add and/or remove stars from the scoreboardof every queen, to secure their spot in the Grand Finale.) | | Points | Result |
|---|---|---|---|---|---|---|---|---|---|---|
| Hidden | +2 | +1 | +5 | — | — | +1 | +5 | +1 | 15 | ADV |
| Lupita | — | +2 | +2 | +2 | — | +5 | +3 | — | 14 | ADV |
| Juana | — | +2 | — | +7 | — | — | +4 | — | 13 | ADV |
| Kyliezz | +2 | -1 | — | +5 | +9 | -5 | — | +2 | 12 | ADV |
| Peke | — | +7 | — | — | +2 | +1 | — | +2 | 12 | ADV |
| Deseos | — | +2 | -1 | +2 | — | -1 | +7 | +1 | 10 | ELIM |
| Raga | -1 | +2 | +2 | +2 | — | +5 | — | — | 10 | ELIM |
| Regina | +4 | -2 | — | — | +0 | +7 | — | -2 | 7 | ELIM |
| Mista | +5 | -2 | — | -1 | — | -5 | — | -4 | -7 | ELIM |

== Lip syncs ==
Legend:

The contestant won the lip sync to win the challenge.
The contestant was not eliminated and simply remained nominated the following week.

| Episode | Bottom contestants | | | Song | Loser |
|---|---|---|---|---|---|
| 1 | Lupita Kush vs. Raga Diamante vs. Regina Bronx | | | "Cuidadito, cuidadito" (María Victoria) | Raga Diamante |
| 1 | Lupita Kush vs. Raga Diamante vs. Regina Bronx | | | "Cuidadito, cuidadito" (María Victoria) | Regina Bronx |
| 2 | Mista Boo | vs. | Regina Bronx | "El baile del perrito" (Wilfrido Vargas) | Mista Boo |
| 2 | Mista Boo | vs. | Regina Bronx | "El baile del perrito" (Wilfrido Vargas) | Regina Bronx |
| 3 | Mista Boo | vs. | Raga Diamante | "Te aviso, te anuncio" (Shakira) | None |
| 4 | Mista Boo (with Madison Basrey) | vs. | Regina Bronx (with Georgiana) | "Cosas del amor" (Vikki Carr, Ana Gabriel) | Mista Boo |
| Episode | Top contestants | | | Song | Winner |
| 5 | Juana Guadalupe vs. La Kyliezz vs. Peke Balderas | | | "Mucha mujer para ti" (Bibi Gaytán) | La Kyliezz |
| Episode | Bottom contestants | | | Song | Loser |
| 6 | Deseos Fab | vs. | La Kyliezz | "Jackpot" (Belinda, Kenia Os) | Deseos Fab |
| Episode | Tie-break contestants | | | Song | Eliminated |
| 7 (Note: Due to a tie in the number of stars between La Kyliezz and Peke Balderas, the two contestants were called upon to perform a lip sync to determine the last finalist; however, after the judges failed to reach a unanimous verdict, both of them were declared as the winners and were both declared finalists.) | La Kyliezz | vs. | Peke Balderas | "Ten paciencia" (Thalía) | None |
| Episode | Tournament contestants | | | Song | Winner |
| 8 | La Kyliezz | vs. | Regina Bronx | "Mucha mujer para ti" (Bibi Gaytán) | None (Note: No winner was announced during the episode's broadcast.) |
| 8 | Hidden Mistake | vs. | Juana Guadalupe | "El baile del perrito" (Wilfrido Vargas) | None |
| 8 | Peke Balderas | vs. | Raga Diamante | "Te aviso, te anuncio" (Shakira) | None |
| 8 | Deseos Fab | vs. | Lupita Kush | "Ten paciencia" (Thalía) | None |
| 8 | Mista Boo | | | "Cuidadito, cuidadito" (María Victoria) | None |

== Judges ==
=== Main judges ===
- Aldo Rendón, celebrity stylist
- Alfonso Waithsman, celebrity make-up artist
- Lola Cortés, singer and actress

=== Special guests ===
Guests who will appear in episodes, but not judge on the main stage.

==== Episode 4 ====
- Esmeralda "Esme" Hernández, president of Beauty Creations Cosmetics

==== Episode 5 ====
- Alex Córdova, photographer

==== Episode 6 ====
- C-Pher, contestant on La Más Draga season 4 and winner of La Más Draga: Solo Las Más season 1

== Episodes ==
| No. overall | No. in season | Title | Original release date |
|---|---|---|---|
| 9 | 1 | "La Más Diva" | 16 June 2026 |
Nine all-stars enter the workroom. For the first main challenge, the queens perform in a talent show.: Deseos Fab - Celebrity Impersonations; Evangelina Elizondo; Hidden Mistake - Live Singing; María Victoria; Juana Guadalupe - Spoken Word; María Félix; La Kyliezz - Dancing; Miroslava Stern and Tongolele; Lupita Kush - Quick Change Routine; Lyn May; Mista Boo - Spoken Word; Macario; Peke Balderas - Original Song; Pedro Infante; Raga Diamante - Original Song; Cantinflas and Tin-Tan; Regina Bronx - Lip-Syncing; Dolores del Río and Pedro Armendáriz; On the runway, category is La Más Diva (Divas del Cine de Oro) (The Most Diva from the Golden Age of Mexican Cinema). Mista Boo is announced as the winner of the main challenge, and receives a Gold Star. La Kyliezz is announced as the second best in the challenge, and receives a Pink Star. Regina Bronx is announced as the winner of the runway challenge, and receives a Gold Star. Hidden Mistake is announced as the second best in the runway challenge, and receives a Pink Star. It is announced that for this week's Purgatory voting, the queens will vote twice, one vote for the main challenge and one vote for the runway challenge. After The Purgatory voting, it is announced that Raga Diamante and Regina Bronx received the most votes for the main challenge, and Lupita Kush received the most votes for the runway challenge. Lupita Kush, Raga Diamante and Regina Bronx lip-sync to "Cuidadito, cuidadito" by María Victoria. Lupita Kush wins the lip-sync. Raga Diamante and Regina Bronx both lose the lip-sync, both receive a Black Star and will both be nominated to compete in the lip-sync in the next episode.: Host: Galilea Montijo; Main Challenge: Perform in a talent show; Challenge Winner: Mista Boo; Challenge Prize: A $10,000 cash tip and a Gold Star; Second Best: La Kyliezz; Second Best Prize: A $5,000 cash tip and a Pink Star; Runway Theme: La Más Diva (Divas del Cine de Oro) (The Most Diva from the Golden Age of Mexican Cinema); Runway Winner: Regina Bronx; Runway Prize: A $10,000 cash tip and a Gold Star; Second Best: Hidden Mistake; Second Best Prize: A $5,000 cash tip and a Pink Star; Bottom Three: Lupita Kush, Raga Diamante and Regina Bronx; Lip-Sync Song: "Cuidadito, cuidadito" by María Victoria; Nominated: Raga Diamante and Regina Bronx
| 10 | 2 | "La Más Típica" | 23 June 2026 |
For this week's mini-challenge, the queens team up and improvise in gossip TV shows. Deseos Fab, Juana Guadalupe, Lupita Kush, Peke Balderas and Raga Diamante win the mini-challenge, and all receive a Pink Star, as well as an additional vote on The Purgatory. Deseos Fab also received a Rainbow Star. A Rainbow Star can be used to steal a Gold Star or a Pink Star from another queen, or use it to get rid of a Black Star. If the Rainbow Star is not used before the semifinals, it will be worth 5 Black Stars. Hidden Mistake, La Kyliezz, Mista Boo and Regina Bronx lose the mini-challenge, and all receive a Black Star. For the main challenge, the queens present a look inspired by the regional costume of any Mexican state or region.: Deseos Fab - Veracruz; Hidden Mistake - Sonora; Juana Guadalupe - Chiapas; La Kyliezz - Jalisco; Lupita Kush - Oaxaca; Mista Boo - Tamaulipas; Peke Balderas - Nuevo León; Raga Diamante - Yucatán; Regina Bronx - Aguascalientes; On the runway, category is La Más Típica (The Most Traditional). Peke Balderas is announced as the winner of the challenge, and receives a Gold Star. Hidden Mistake is announced as the second best in the challenge, and receives a Pink Star. After The Purgatory voting, it is announced that Mista Boo received the most votes, and will lip-sync against the previously nominated queens, Raga Diamante and Regina Bronx. However, as the winner of this week's challenge, Peke Balderas was given the power to save either Raga Diamante or Regina Bronx, who were currently nominated, from lip-syncing. Peke Balderas chose to save Raga Diamante. Mista Boo and Regina Bronx lip-sync to "El baile del perrito" by Wilfrido Vargas. Mista Boo and Regina Bronx both lose the lip-sync, both receive a Black Star and will both be nominated to compete in the lip-sync in the next episode.: Host: Vanessa Claudio; Mini-Challenge: In teams, improvise in gossip TV shows; Mini-Challenge Winners: Deseos Fab, Juana Guadalupe, Lupita Kush, Peke Balderas and Raga Diamante; Mini-Challenge Prize: A Pink Star and an additional vote on The Purgatory; Deseos Fab also received a Rainbow Star; Mini-Challenge Losers: Hidden Mistake, La Kyliezz, Mista Boo and Regina Bronx; Mini-Challenge Punishment: A Black Star; Main Challenge: Present a look inspired by the regional costume of any Mexican state or region; Runway Theme: La Más Típica (The Most Traditional); Challenge Winner: Peke Balderas; Challenge Prize: A $10,000 cash tip and a Gold Star; Second Best: Hidden Mistake; Second Best Prize: A $5,000 cash tip and a Pink Star; Bottom Two: Mista Boo and Regina Bronx; Lip-Sync Song: "El baile del perrito" by Wilfrido Vargas; Nominated: Mista Boo and Regina Bronx
| 11 | 3 | "La Más Típica" | 30 June 2026 |
For this week's mini-challenge, the queens must waltz from side to side while trying to fit through cutouts in large, rotating walls. Lupita Kush and Raga Diamante win the mini-challenge, and receive a Rainbow Star and a Pink Star, respectively. Deseos Fab loses the mini-challenge, and receives a Black Star. For the main challenge, the queens present a look inspired by a traditional Mexican Dish.: Deseos Fab - Chicharrón; Hidden Mistake - Esquites; Juana Guadalupe - Mole; La Kyliezz - Dorilocos; Lupita Kush - Al pastor; Mista Boo - Flautas; Peke Balderas - Burrito; Raga Diamante - Cochinita pibil; Regina Bronx - Tamales; On the runway, category is La Más Antojable (The Most Craveable). Hidden Mistake is announced as the winner of the challenge, and receives a Gold Star. Lupita Kush is announced as the second best in the challenge, and receives a Pink Star. After The Purgatory voting, it is announced that Raga Diamante received the most votes, and will lip-sync against the previously nominated queens, Mista Boo and Regina Bronx. However, as the winner of this week's challenge, Hidden Mistake was given the power to save either Mista Boo or Regina Bronx, who were currently nominated, from lip-syncing. Hidden Mistake chose to save Regina Bronx. Mista Boo and Raga Diamante lip-sync to "Te aviso, te anuncio" by Shakira. Mista Boo and Raga Diamante both win the lip-sync.: Host: Karla Díaz-Leal Arreguín; Mini-Challenge: Waltz from side to side while trying to fit through cutouts in large, rotating walls; Mini-Challenge Winners: Lupita Kush and Raga Diamante; Mini-Challenge Prize: Respectively, a Rainbow Star and a Pink Star; Mini-Challenge Loser: Deseos Fab; Mini-Challenge Punishment: A Black Star; Main Challenge: Present a look inspired by a traditional Mexican Dish; Runway Theme: La Más Antojable (The Most Craveable); Challenge Winner: Hidden Mistake; Challenge Prize: A $10,000 cash tip and a Gold Star; Second Best: Lupita Kush; Second Best Prize: A $5,000 cash tip and a Pink Star; Bottom Two: Mista Boo and Raga Diamante; Lip-Sync Song: "Te aviso, te anuncio" by Shakira; Nominated: None
| 12 | 4 | "La Más Cachuda" | 7 July 2026 |
For this week's main challenge, the queens create an outfit using piñata materials, paired with a La Más Draga: Solo Las Más season 1 contestant or coach.: Deseos Fab and Madison Basrey; Hidden Mistake and Gvajardo; Juana Guadalupe and Soro Nasty; La Kyliezz and C-Pher; Lupita Kush and Rebel Mörk; Mista Boo and Velvetine; Peke Balderas and Rudy Reyes; Raga Diamante and Aviesc Who?; Regina Bronx and Georgiana; On the runway, category is La Más Cachuda (The Most Horned). La Kyliezz is announced as the winner of the main challenge, and receives a Gold Star. Juana Guadalupe and Raga Diamante are announced as the second best in the challenge, and both receive a Pink Star. Juana Guadalupe is announced as the winner of the runway challenge, and receives a Gold Star. Deseos Fab and Lupita Kush are announced as the second best in the runway challenge, and both receive a Pink Star. It is announced that for this week's Purgatory voting, the queens as well as the queens' partners will both vote. After The Purgatory voting, it is announced that Mista Boo and Regina Bronx received the most votes, and will lip-sync. They lip-sync to "Cosas del amor" by Vikki Carr and Ana Gabriel. Regina Bronx wins the lip-sync. Mista Boo loses the lip-sync, receives a Black Star and will be nominated to compete in the lip-sync in the next episode.: Host: Roberto Carlo Alanís Almaguer; Main Challenge: Create an outfit using piñata materials, paired with a La Más Draga: Solo Las Más season 1 contestant or coach; Challenge Winner: La Kyliezz; Challenge Prize: A $10,000 cash tip and a Gold Star; Challenge Second Best: Juana Guadalupe and Raga Diamante; Challenge Second Best Prize: A $5,000 cash tip and a Pink Star; Runway Theme: La Más Cachuda (The Most Horned); Runway Winner: Juana Guadalupe; Runway Prize: A $10,000 cash tip and a Gold Star; Runway Second Best: Deseos Fab and Lupita Kush; Runway Second Best Prize: A $5,000 cash tip and a Pink Star; Bottom Two: Mista Boo (with Madison Basrey) and Regina Bronx (with Georgiana); Lip-Sync Song: "Cosas del amor" by Vikki Carr and Ana Gabriel; Nominated: Mista Boo
| 13 | 5 | "La Más Monja Coronada" | 14 July 2026 |
For this week's mini-challenge, the queens do a photoshoot posing on a mechanical surfboard. Peke Balderas and Regina Bronx win the mini-challenge, and receive a Pink Star and a Rainbow Star, respectively. La Kyliezz loses the mini-challenge, and receives a Black Star. For the main challenge, the queens present a look inspired by the Crowned Nun Portraits that then reveals into a sexy lingerie look. On the runway, category is La Más Monja Coronada (The Most Crowned Nun). It is announced that Juana Guadalupe, La Kyliezz and Peke Balderas are the top three queens of the week, and will lip-sync for the win and for two Gold Stars. Juana Guadalupe, La Kyliezz and Peke Balderas lip-sync to "Mucha mujer para ti" by Bibi Gaytán. After the lip-sync, La Kyliezz is announced as the winner of the challenge.: Host: Maca Carriedo; Mini-Challenge: Photoshoot posing on a mechanical surfboard; Mini-Challenge Winners: Peke Balderas and Regina Bronx; Mini-Challenge Prize: Respectively, a Pink Star and a Rainbow Star; Mini-Challenge Loser: La Kyliezz; Mini-Challenge Punishment: A Black Star; Main Challenge: Present a look inspired by the Crowned Nun Portraits that then reveals into a sexy lingerie look; Runway Theme: La Más Monja Coronada (The Most Crowned Nun); Top Three: Juana Guadalupe, La Kyliezz and Peke Balderas; Lip-Sync Song: "Mucha mujer para ti" by Bibi Gaytán; Challenge Winner: La Kyliezz; Challenge Prize: A $10,000 cash tip and two Gold Stars; Nominated: None
