= La Más Draga: Solo Las Más =

Mexican reality television series

- Genre: Reality competition
- Directed by: Carlo Villarreal; Bruno Olvez
- Presented by: Lorena Herrera (S1); Vanessa Claudio; Karla Díaz-Leal Arreguín; Roberto Carlo; Maca Carriedo; Marisol González; Galilea Montijo (S2)
- Judges: Alfonso Waithsman; Lola Cortés; Luis Torres (S1); Aldo Rendón (S2)
- Country of origin: Mexico
- Original language: Spanish
- No. of seasons: 2
- No. of episodes: 16

Production
- Producers: Carlo Villarreal; Bruno Olvez
- Camera setup: Multi-camera
- Running time: 45–95 minutes
- Production company: La Gran Diabla Productions

Original release
- Network: YouTube
- Release: 19 March 2024

Related
- La Más Draga

La Más Draga: Solo Las Más ('The Draggest: Only the Best') is a Mexican reality competition spin off edition of the original La Más Draga, which is produced by La Gran Diabla Productions. The show premiered on March 19, 2024 on YouTube.

The show documents past queens from the franchise returning to compete at the invitation of the production. As in the original series, the contestants compete by performing various challenges week after week to find La Más Draga of Mexico and Latin America, through different tests, whether it be singing, acting, comedy or dancing.

== Production ==
=== Format ===
The reality competition show is set as to have weekly challenges to eliminate the participants and thus find the best one. Each week the contestants face a series of challenges, guided and advised by a former La Más Draga winner. Each episode there is a mini-challenge and a runway walk according to a theme of Mexican culture where each participant demonstrates their versatility.

Unlike the main series, however, the judges offer critiques without assigning scores or rankings to each contestant; instead, they simply announce the winner of the challenge and the runner-up, with each of them receiving a star and a prize. More than one contestant may be named runner-up of a challenge.

Every episode, each contestant has the opportunity to accumulate stars and add them to their track record, which is physically represented by a board displayed in El Camerino NYX. There are three different types of stars (i.e. Gold, Pink, and Black), each obtained through distinct methods and with varying values. During the semifinals, the final score of each contestant is calculated, with the three or four highest scores advancing to the finale.

=== Judges ===
Judges on La Más Draga
Judge	Season	
Judge	1	2
Aldo Rendón		Main
Alfonso Waithsman	Main	Main
Lola Cortés	Main	Main
Luis Torres	Main	

=== Coaches ===
Coaches on La Más Draga
Judge	Season	
Judge	1	2
Aviesc Who?	Main	
Rebel Mörk		Main

== Series overview ==
Season	Contestants	Episodes	Originally released			Winner	Runners-up	La Más Querida	Máxima de la Revancha
Season	Contestants	Episodes	First released	Last released	Network	Winner	Runners-up	La Más Querida	Máxima de la Revancha
1	8	8	19 March 2024	7 May 2024	YouTube	C-Pher	Georgiana; Madison Basrey; Sirena	Velvetine	Gvajardo
2	9	9	16 June 2026	15 August 2026	YouTube	La Kyliezz	Hidden Mistake; Juana Guadalupe; Lupita Kush; Peke Balderas	Mista Boo	—N/a

=== Season 1 (2024) ===
The first season of La Más Draga: Solo Las Más premiered on 19 March 2024 throughout YouTube. The season ran for eight episodes and concluded on 7 May 2024. Qvajardo won the Máxima de La Revencha title, while Velvetine was voted as La Más Querida. Georgiana, Madison Basrey and Sirena were the runner-ups, and C-Pher was the winner of the first season.

=== Season 2 (2026) ===
The second season of La Más Draga: Solo Las Más premiered on 16 June 2026 throughout YouTube. The season ran for nine episodes and concluded on 15 August 2026. Mista Boo was voted as La Más Querida. Hidden Mistake, Juana Guadalupe, Lupita Kush and Peke Balderas were the runner-ups, and La Kyliezz was the winner of the second season.
