= Indochristian art =

Art in Latin America combining Christian and native influences

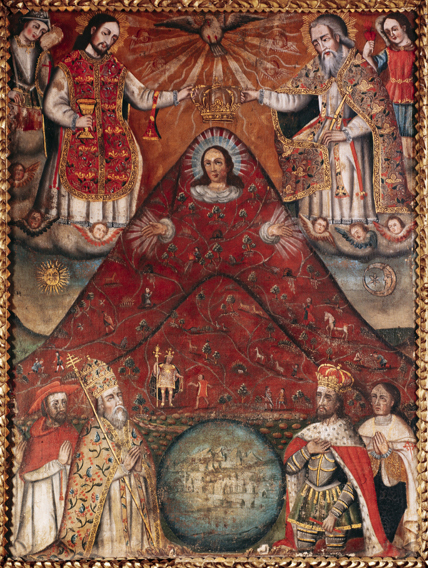
The Potosí Madonna depicts the Cerro Rico in Potosí with the face of the Virgin Mary, evoking the Andean earth mother Pachamama. The Holy Trinity, Christian angels and saints, and the Sun and Moon (which the Incas saw as gods) are shown at the top of the painting, and Spanish authorities look on from below, while an Inca in royal garb is seen on the hill itself.

Indochristian art (Spanish: arte indocristiano), is a type of Latin American art that combines European colonial influences with Indigenous artistic styles and traditions.

During the Spanish colonization of the Americas, Franciscan, Dominican, and Augustinian monks extensively converted indigenous peoples to Christianity, introducing them to European arts and aesthetics. The arts of this period reflect a fusion of European and indigenous religious beliefs, aesthetics, and artistic traditions.

The term Indochristian art was coined by Constantino Reyes-Valerio, a scholar of pre-Columbian Mesoamerican culture and arts, in his book, Indochristian Art, Sculpture and Painting of 16th Century Mexico. Reyes-Valerio's work focused on the painting and sculpture of churches and monasteries in New Spain, but had broader implications for the analysis of art throughout Latin America.

== Origins of the term ==
=== Coinage of term Indochristian Art ===
The term indochristian art was coined by Constantino Reyes-Valerio in his 1978 work, Arte indocristiano: escultura del siglo XVI en México. This work was followed by an analysis of indochristian mural painting, and the two books were re-published in combined form in 2000. In this work, Reyes-Valerio defines indochristian art as art that is indigenous in its production but Christian in its themes, using the term as a designation for artwork that blended symbolic elements of Christian and pre-Hispanic cultures. An expert in pre-Columbian Mesoamerican sculpture, Reyes-Valerio focuses his studies on art produced in monastic settings in New Spain, primarily examining sculptures and paintings that ornament monasteries and convents, and identifying iconographic connections to earlier indigenous works.

Reyes-Valerio's coinage of the term indochristian art was based on his 45 years of experience studying pre-Columbian and colonial monuments throughout Mexico. In tracing the indigenous influence on colonial art, Reyes-Valerio relies primarily on close analysis of artistic details and motifs, a process he calls “speaking to the art”, but supports this analysis with documentary sources such as the journals of Augustinian, Franciscan, and Dominican friars.

Reyes-Valerio not only discusses indigenous artistic production, but ties this art to the educational systems created by European monks. He argues that the use of traditional native religious imagery by Indian artists is a form of rebellion intended to keep their traditions alive.

=== Criticisms of the term ===
Although the significance of Reyes-Valerio's contribution to the identification of indigenous iconography within colonial monastic art is widely recognized, a number of art historians have criticized the implications of the word "indochristian" as well as Reyes-Valerio's analysis of the cultural context in which the art was produced.

In the book, Mestizaje and Globalization : Transformations of Identity and Power, Stefanie Wickstrom argues against the use of the term "indochristian". Wickstrom claims that the term oversimplifies colonial monastic art and the intentions of the artists by categorizing each element as either Indian or Christian in symbolism, failing to account for the evolution of a mestizo art form as Christian symbolism made contact with new cultures and evolved.

Others have objected to Reyes-Valerio's discussion of colonization; in discussing the colonization of New Spain, Reyes-Valerio makes the controversial claim that the spiritual conquest of Europeans over indigenous people was more damaging than the armed conquest. Further, in his descriptions of the interactions between monks and indigenous people, Reyes-Valerio focuses primarily on the psychological harm done to the indigenous people as they lost their ancestral religious beliefs.

=== Related discussion of Indigenous artistic influence ===
Throughout the twentieth century, there were a number of movements to re-evaluate the role of indigenous peoples in creation of Latin American national identities. In Mexico following the revolution, the Indigenismo movement placed increased value on indigenous culture and historical significance. This shift was reflected in a shift in art historian’s attitudes towards indigenous art and aesthetics. These influences on colonial art had largely been overlooked up until this point.

Recognition of indigenous artistic influences varied widely, with art historians only gradually recognizing the existence of an indigenous influence on Mexican colonial art. In 1939, Agustin Velazquez Chavez described the art of New Spain as the product of a mixing of Indian and Spanish cultures in conflict, placing special significance on the “Mexican” nature of this entwining of cultures. In describing the Churrigueresque art of Mexico, Miguel Toussaint used the term “mestizo,” recognizing the participation of Indigenous people in the art of colonial Mexico.

The term “Tequitqui” was created by José Moreno Villa to categorize artistic works with a fusion of Spanish and Indigenous elements. With this term, which in Nahuatl means “tributary,” Moreno Villa drew a comparison between the art of colonial Mexico and the Mudéjar art of Muslims in Spain during the Reconquista. Tequitqui was the first term used specifically to identify art combining colonial and indigenous influences, however, Moreno Villa limited its application to works in which the indigenous artist represents atavistic religious symbols. In later works Moreno Villa elaborates on his interpretation of Mexican colonial art, stating that the indigenous contribution to the genre was limited to the non-Christian deities represented, while claiming that the artistic style of colonial artworks was not tied to indigenous artistic traditions.

== Examples ==
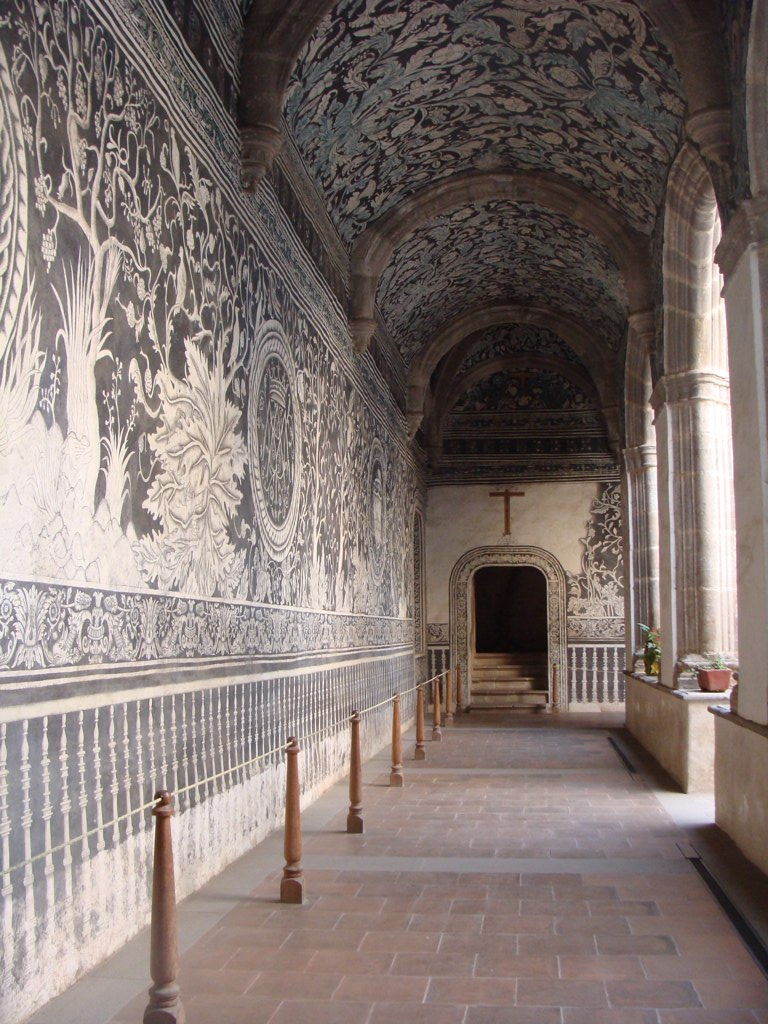
Murals at the mission church of San Salvador, Malinalco, Mexico use native flora and fauna and indigenous concepts of the afterlife to depict the Christian garden of paradise.

Although the term "indochristian art" was originally only used to describe Mexican monastic sculpture and murals, by definition, it applies to any art that is created by indigenous artists and contains Christian themes. It can be applied to a wide variety of artistic traditions from colonial Latin America. The term becomes increasingly difficult to apply to art in the late colonial and post-colonial periods, however, as it relies upon a clearly defined opposition between indigenous artist and Euro-Christian themes. The way that indochristian art is defined overlooks the entanglement of Native and European identities and the mixing of cultures that gradually developed throughout Latin America.

Religious artworks from colonial Latin America often demonstrate indochristian influence in a variety of ways. Indochristian art often includes depictions of atavistic deities and religious symbols, hieroglyphs, figures with indigenous features and traditional indigenous dress, and native flora and fauna. In addition, it may use traditional artistic styles of representation.

=== Monastic Art ===
In the early years of colonization, art was primarily commissioned by the church. As Augustinian, Dominican, and Franciscan missionaries attempted to convert the native populations of the Americas, their techniques varied widely, but frequently involved threats of violence. Missionaries generally attempted to eliminate indigenous culture, converting native people not only to Christianity, but also to European social practices.

Much Latin American monastic art of the colonial period could be designated as indochristian. Murals, paintings, architectural designs, sculptures, and ornamental objects all were frequently created by native craftspeople and incorporated indigenous iconography.

=== Cuzco School ===
The Cuzco School was an artistic tradition associated with Cusco, Peru. Following the Spanish conquest of the Incan empire, a group of Spanish religious artists were sent to Cusco to aid in the conversion of Inca people to Catholicism. This group of artists began a school, teaching Quechua and mestizo people to draw and use oil paints according to European styles.

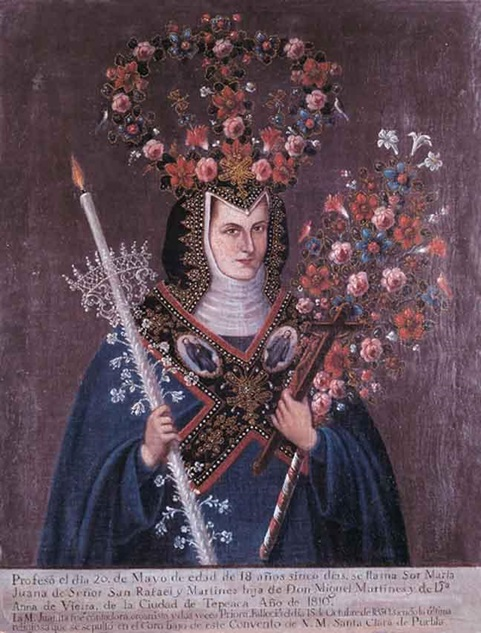
An example of a crowned nun, combining traditional Mesoamerican flower art with Christian iconography

Based on pre-columbian artistic traditions, Cusqueño painters created artworks anonymously and included native flora and fauna in their works. They also created a tradition of painting Inca monarchs – a departure from Christian religious themes and an expression of cultural pride.

=== Ángel Arcabucero (Arquebusier Angel) ===
Ángel arcabucero is a genre of painting tied to the Cuzco school. These paintings depict angels holding an arquebus, or early firearm, and dressed in clothing reminiscent of that worn by Andean nobility. These angels are believed to be connected to pre-Hispanic winged warriors.

=== Monja Coronada (Crowned Nun) ===
Monja Coronada (Crowned nun) is a genre of portrait paintings common among Mexican convents. These commemorative portraits of nuns wearing bridal clothes and floral crowns were common in the 18th century. From a Euro-Christian perspective, the nuns' bridal trappings allude to the Virgin Mary crowned, symbolizing mystical marriage to God and victory over sin. This Christian symbolism is, however, combined with Mesoamerican imagery; the paintings frequently replace the traditional European palm frond with a Mesoamerican flower staff, and ornament the crown with flowers according to traditional flower art practices. In addition, the bird and butterfly imagery that is frequently included in crowned nun portraits may symbolize indigenous beliefs regarding the soul and the afterlife.

== See also ==
Our Lady of Guadalupe#Venerated image and Diego's tilma
