= Eva Blunt =

Mexican drag performer

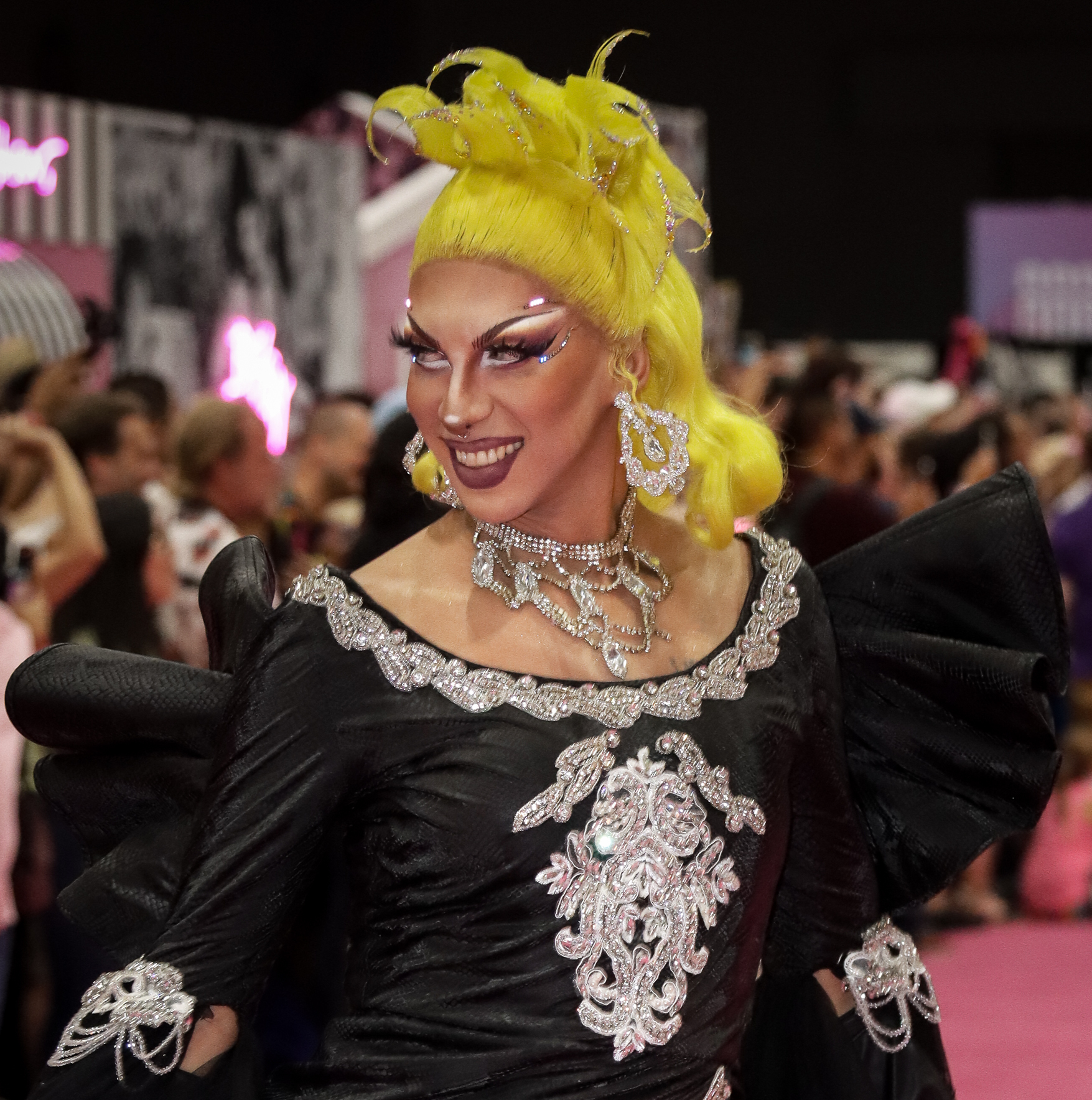
- Eva Blunt at RuPaul's DragCon LA, 2024
- Born: Pablo Levy
- Occupation: Drag performer
- Television: La Más Draga (season 1); Drag Race México (season 2)

Eva Blunt is the stage name of Pablo Levy, a Mexican drag performer who competed on the first season of La Más Draga, the second season of Drag Race México, and Drag Race México: Latina Royale. She is from Mexico City. Eva Blunt collaborated with producer Neiko on the song "Eso Que Enamora".

== Filmography ==
=== Television ===
Year	Title	Role	Notes
2024	Drag Race Mexico season 2	Herself (contestant)	Runner-up
2026	Drag Race México: Latina Royale	Herself (contestant)	

=== Web series ===
Year	Title	Role	Notes
2018	La Más Draga season 1	Herself (contestant)	Runner-up

== Discography ==
Year	Title	Album	Writer(s)	Producer(s)
2018	"Eso Que Enamora"	Non-Album/Single	N/A	Neiko Music
2024	"Ya No Quiero" (the cast of Drag Race Mexico season 2)	Non-Album/ Single	N/A	Omar Antonio Sosa Latourmerie

== Awards and nominations ==
Year	Award	Category	Work	Result	Ref.
2024	Impulse LGBTIQ+ Awards	Drag del Año	Herself	Winner	
