= Constantino Reyes-Valerio =

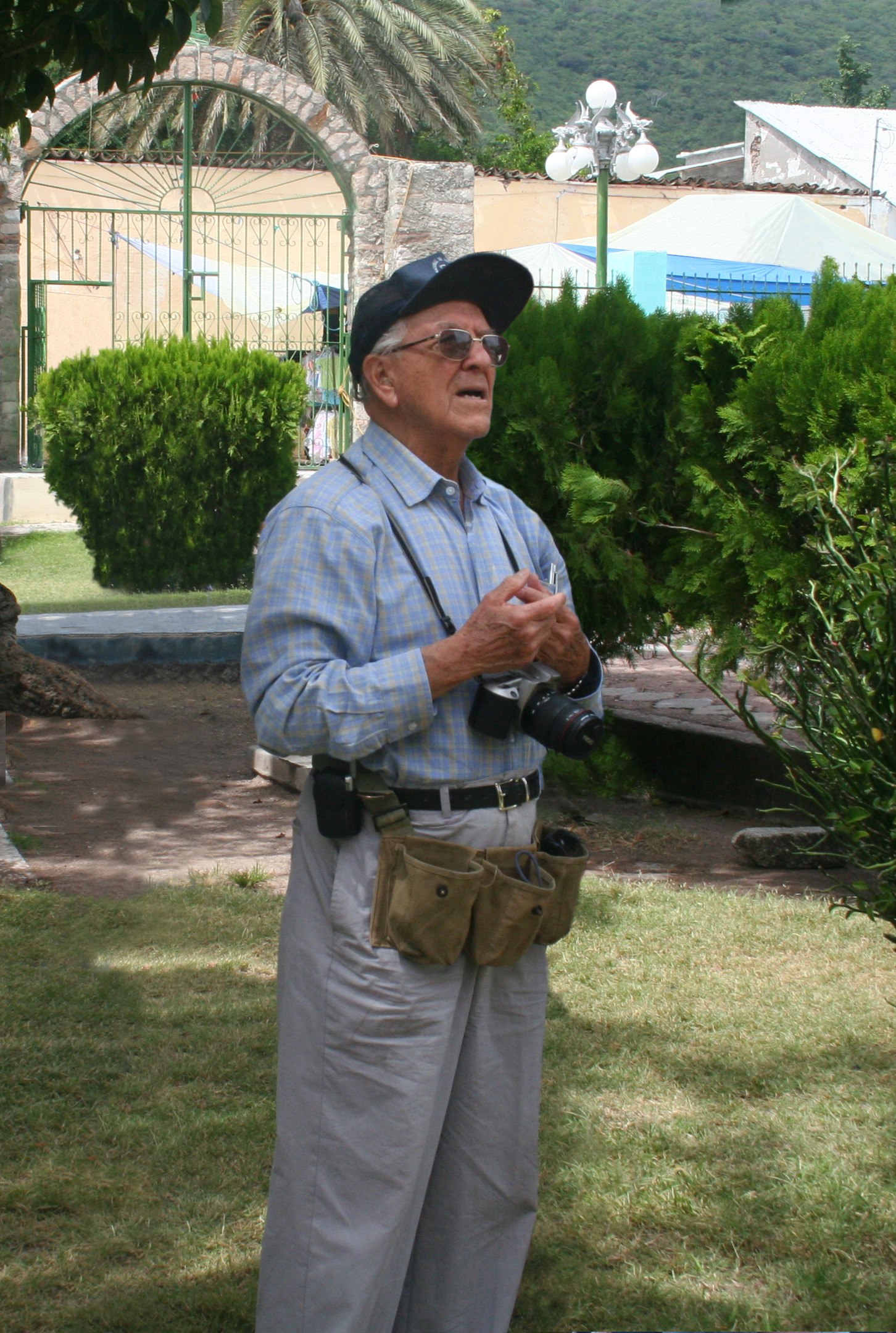
- Born: January 10, 1922; Zinacatepec, Puebla, Mexico
- Died: December 13, 2006 (aged 84); Mexico City, Mexico
- Education: I.P.N, U.N.A.M
- Known for: Arte Indocristiano, Azul Maya, Christian Iconography
- Scientific career
- Workplaces: Instituto Nacional de Antropologia e Historia (INAH)

Constantino Reyes-Valerio (January 10, 1922, Zinacatepec, Puebla - December 13, 2006, Mexico City) was a prominent Mexican scholar of pre-Columbian Mesoamerican cultures, particularly the Aztec and the Maya, an expert in Christian Iconography of the Romanic and Gothic periods in Europe and the Colonial period in Mexico. Reyes-Valerio coined the term "Arte Indocristiano" to refer to the Latinamerican Art that combines European Christian iconography with native Indigenous expressions and traditions both in mural paintings and sculpture.

He studied both History and Chemistry, a combination that helped him decipher the chemical composition and a recipe to recreate the Maya blue pigment.

== Life and career ==
In 1947 he arrived in Mexico City, where five years later he obtained a master's degree in Bacteriological Chemistry and Parasitology at the National Polytechnic Institute.

Reyes-Valerio identified the artistic contribution of Native Mexican Indians in the Colonial painting and sculpture; he coined the term Indochristian art. Another major contribution was his seminal work on the chemical composition and process of the Maya Blue Pigment where he re-discovered the technique used by the Maya to create the famous turquoise blue pigment. He was granted a Guggenheim Fellowship in 1972 for Fine Arts Research. He corresponded extensively with major scholars in Mexico and abroad such as George Kubler, Santiago Sebastian and Enrique Marco Dorta among others. In 2000, he was named emeritus Researcher by the Instituto Nacional de Antropología e Historia.

In April 2009, a special edition of the INAH bulletin (Boletin de Monumentos Historicos Num 12 enero-abril 2008) was published as an in memoriam edition dedicated to Constantino Reyes-Valerio. Several important researchers, Miguel Leon-Portilla, Alfredo López Austin, Eduardo Matos Moctezuma, Giacomo Chiari, Carlos Navarrete Cáceres, Beatriz Barba Ahuatzin, Dora Sierra, Guillermo Tovar y de Teresa, Manuel Sanchez del Rio, Rosa Camelo among others contributed with articles to this bulletin.

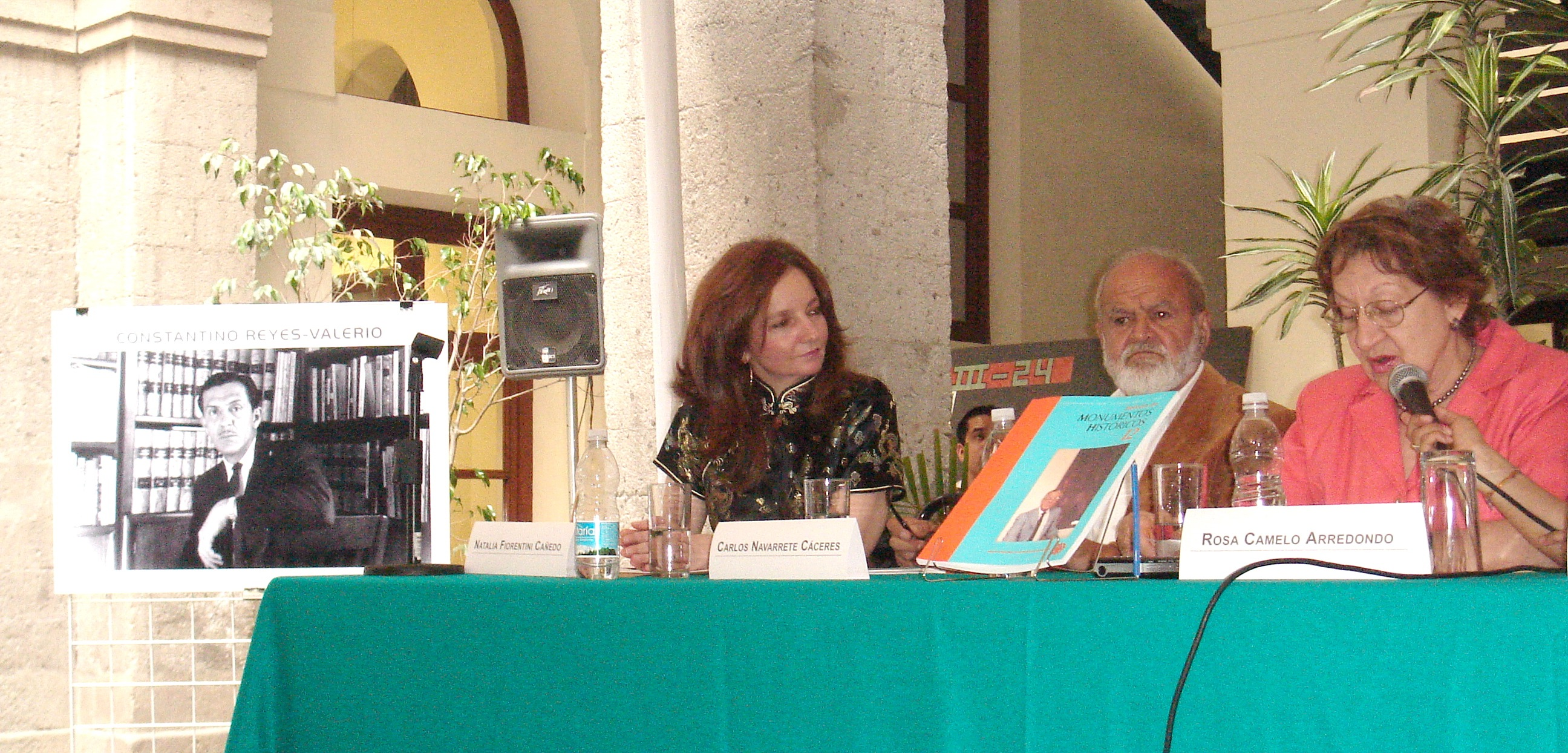
Event at which the Photographic Archive of INAH's Coordinacion de Monumentos Historicos was named after Constantino Reyes-Valerio. On the Photograph: Natalia Fiorentini, Carlos Navarrete and Rosa Camelo and a picture of Reyes-Valerio on the far left.

He was a very active photographer and took the photographs for several books and to the general archive of the INAH. In 2009, his contribution was recognised by naming the Photographic Archive of the "Coordinacion Nacional de Monumentos Culturales" of INAH with his name.

He received several awards, including the Guggenheim Fellowship, the Rafael Ramirez Prize granted by the S.E.P., Premio Francisco Javier Clavijero granted by INAH and the emeritus Researcher degree by INAH as well.

He died on December 13, 2006, in Mexico City.

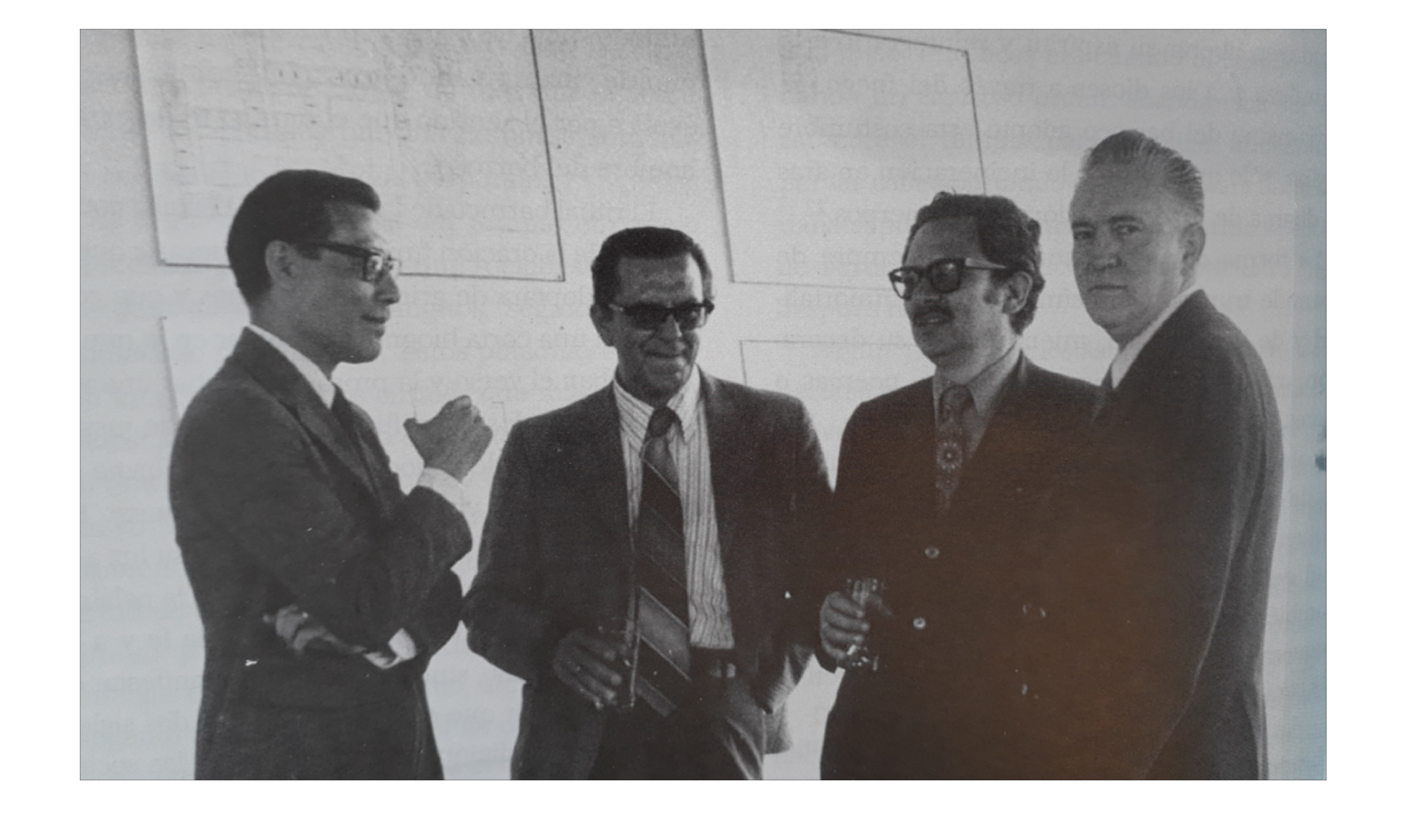
Photograph of Carlos Chanfon, Constantino Reyes-Valerio, Carlos Martinez Marin and Jorge Gurria

== Main works ==
=== Books ===
- 1960 Tepalcingo.
- 1960 Trilogía Barroca.
- 1964 Colegios de Tepotzotlán.
- 1964 Juan Gersón. Tlacuilo de Tecamachalco.
- 1967 Tepotzotlán.
- 1977 El Libro De Villard De Honnecourt. Manuscrito del siglo XIII.
- 1978 Arte Indocristiano. Escultura del siglo XVI en México.
- 1989 El pintor de conventos. Los murales del siglo XVI en la Nueva España, México, INAH
- 1993 De Bonampak al Templo Mayor. El Azul maya en Mesoamérica.
- 2000 Arte indocristiano. Escultura y pintura del siglo XVI en México.

=== Phothographic works ===
- 1965 Mexican Art. Justino Fernández
- 1967 Museo Nacional de Antropología. Eugenio Fishgrund
- 1967 Museo Nacional de Historia. Eugenio Fishgrund
- 1969 100 obras maestras del Museo Nacional de Antropología, México. José Bolea
- 1974 Pintura del siglo XVII, por Diego Angulo Íñiguez,
- 1974 El arte en América y Filipinas por Enrique Marco Dorta.
- 1985 Arte iberoamericano desde la colonización a la independencia, por Santiago Sebastián, José de Mesa y Teresa Gisbert de Meza.

== See also ==
- Maya Blue
- Indochristian art
