= La Más Draga season 1 =

La Más Draga
- Season 1
- Promotional poster for season one
- Hosted by: Lorena Herrera
- Judges: Bernardo "Letal" Vázquez; Johnny Carmona; Yari Mejía
- No. of contestants: 7
- Winner: Deborah La Grande
- Runners-up: Margaret Y Ya; Bárbara Durango; Eva Blunt
- No. of episodes: 7

Release
- Original network: YouTube
- Original release: 8 May – 19 June 2018

Season chronology
- Next → Season 2

The first season of La Más Draga premiered on 8 May and concluded on 19 June 2018. The competition was broadcast on YouTube, and was produced by La Gran Diabla Producciones. The series featured seven contestants, from all over Mexico City, competing for the title of La Más Draga of Mexico and Latin America and a cash prize of $50,000 MXN Pesos. The winner of the first season of La Más Draga was Deborah La Grande, with Bárbara Durango, Eva Blunt and Margaret Y Ya as runners-up.

The judges panel of this season include Mexican singer and actress Lorena Herrera, who was also the main host, TV and Internet personality Johnny Carmona, hair and makeup artist Yari Mejía, and drag performer Letal.

The season consisted of seven one-hour episodes.

== Contestants ==
Ages, names, and cities stated are at time of filming.

Contestants of La Más Draga season 1 and their backgrounds
| Contestant | Age | Hometown (Note: All the contestants resided in the Mexico City area during filming.) | Outcome |
|---|---|---|---|
| Deborah La Grande | 29 | Mexico City | Winner |
| Bárbara Durango | 27 | Mexico City | Runners-up |
| Eva Blunt | 30 | Mexico City | Runners-up |
| Margaret Y Ya | 23 | Mexico City | Runners-up |
| Lana (Note: Lana Boswell is referred to as Lana on the show.) | 24 | Mexico City | 5th place |
| Debra Men | 26 | Mexico City | 6th place (Note: Debra Men was voted La Más Querida.) |
| Cordelia Durango | 28 | Mexico City | 7th place |

== Contestant progress ==
Legend:

Deborah La Grande won La Más Draga season 1.
Bárbara Durango, Eva Blunt and Margaret Y Ya were the runners-up.
Debra Men was voted La Más Querida (LMQ).
WIN indicates the contestant won the challenge in that episode.
SAFE indicates that the contestant was declared safe by the judges in that episode.
BTM (Bottom) indicates that the contestant had to lip sync in that episode.
ELIM (Eliminated) indicates that the contestant was eliminated in that episode.
Guest indicates the contestant returned as a guest for that episode.

Progress of contestants including placements in each episode
| Contestant | Episode | | | | | | |
| Contestant | 1 | 2 | 3 | 4 | 5 | 6 | 7 |
|---|---|---|---|---|---|---|---|
| Deborah La Grande | BTM | SAFE | SAFE | SAFE | BTM | Guest | Winner |
| Bárbara Durango | SAFE | SAFE | BTM | BTM | WIN | Guest | Runner-up |
| Eva Blunt | SAFE | SAFE | WIN | SAFE | SAFE | Guest | Runner-up |
| Margaret Y Ya | SAFE | WIN | SAFE | WIN | BTM | Guest | Runner-up |
| Lana | SAFE | BTM | SAFE | ELIM | | Guest | Guest |
| Debra Men | BTM | SAFE | ELIM | | | Guest | LMQ |
| Cordelia Durango | WIN | ELIM | | Guest | | Guest | Guest |

== Lip syncs ==
| Episode | Contestants (Judges' votes to stay) | | | Song | Eliminated |
|---|---|---|---|---|---|
| 1 | Deborah La Grande (2 votes) | vs. | Debra Men (2 votes) | "Bésame mucho" (Susana Zabaleta) | None |
| 2 | Cordelia Durango (1 vote) | vs. | Lana (3 votes) | "Quinceañera" (Timbiriche) | Cordelia Durango |
| 2 | Cordelia Durango (1 vote) | vs. | Lana (3 votes) | "Enferma de amor" (Jeans) | Cordelia Durango |
| 2 | Cordelia Durango (1 vote) | vs. | Lana (3 votes) | "El baile del sapito" (Belinda) | Cordelia Durango |
| 3 | Bárbara Durango (3 votes) | vs. | Debra Men (2 votes) | "Arrasando" (Thalía) | Debra Men |
| 4 | Bárbara Durango (4 votes) | vs. | Lana (0 votes) | "Cielo rojo" (Regina Orozco) | Lana |
| 5 | Deborah La Grande (2 votes) | vs. | Margaret Y Ya (2 votes) | "Dos mujeres, un camino" (Laura León) | None |

The contestant was eliminated after their first time in the bottom.
The contestant was eliminated after their second time in the bottom.

== Judges ==
=== Main judges ===
- Bernardo "Letal" Vázquez, drag queen and professional makeup artist
- Johnny Carmona, TV and Internet personality
- Yari Mejía, designer, stylist, singer and model

=== Guest judges ===
Listed in chronological order.

- Susana Zabaleta, soprano and actress
- Los Jonas Vloggers, Internet personalities
- Alfonso Waithsman, makeup artist
- Regina Orozco, actress and singer
- Alex Córdova, photographer
- Cesar "Teo" Doroteo, comedian and Internet personality
- Manelyk González, Internet personality
- Mannuna, actor and comedian
- Quique Galdeano, entrepreneur and Internet personality
- Vanessa Claudio, Puerto Rican model and TV personality

=== Special guests ===
Guests who will appear in episodes, but not judge on the main stage.

Episode 2

- Pedro Gea, dancer and choreographer

Episode 4

- Chio, alebrijes craftsman

Episode 5

- Quecho Muñoz, actor, singer, and writer

Episode 7

- Paris Bang Bang, drag performer
- Rhoma Queen, drag performer

== Episodes ==
| No. overall | No. in season | Title | Original release date |
|---|---|---|---|
| 1 | 1 | "La Más Diva" | 8 May 2018 |
Seven drag performers enter the workroom. For the first main challenge, the contestants present a look inspired by divas from the Golden Age of Mexican Cinema. The contestants represented the following divas: Bárbara Durango - Ninón Sevilla; Cordelia Durango - Sara García; Deborah La Grande - Tongolele; Debra Men - Pedro Infante; Eva Blunt - Tongolele; Lana - Elsa Aguirre and María Félix; Margaret Y Ya - Ninón Sevilla; On the runway, category is La Más Diva (Divas del Cine de Oro) (The Most Diva from the Golden Age of Mexican Cinema). Cordelia Durango and Margaret Y Ya receive positive critiques, with Cordelia Durango winning the challenge. Bárbara Durango, Deborah La Grande and Debra Men receive negative critiques, with Bárbara Durango being safe. Deborah La Grande and Debra Men lip-sync to "Bésame mucho" by Susana Zabaleta. Both contestants win the lip-sync and no one goes home.: Guest Judge: Susana Zabaleta; Main Challenge: Present a look inspired by divas from the Golden Age of Mexican Cinema; Runway Theme: La Más Diva (Divas del Cine de Oro) (The Most Diva from the Golden Age of Mexican Cinema); Challenge Winner: Cordelia Durango; Bottom Two: Deborah La Grande and Debra Men; Lip-Sync Song: "Bésame mucho" by Susana Zabaleta; Eliminated: None
| 2 | 2 | "La Más Quinceañera" | 15 May 2018 |
For this week's main challenge, the contestants present a look inspired by the Quinceañera celebration. On the runway, category is La Más Quinceañera (The Most Quinceañera). Bárbara Durango, Debra Men and Margaret Y Ya receive positive critiques, with Margaret Y Ya winning the challenge. Cordelia Durango, Eva Blunt and Lana receive negative critiques, with Eva Blunt being safe. Cordelia Durango and Lana lip-sync to "Quinceañera" by Timbiriche, "Enferma de amor" by Jeans and "El baile del sapito" by Belinda. Lana wins the lip-sync and Cordelia Durango is the first queen to be eliminated.: Guest Judge: Los Jonas Vloggers; Main Challenge: Present a look inspired by the Quinceañera celebration; Runway Theme: La Más Quinceañera (The Most Quinceañera); Challenge Winner: Margaret Y Ya; Bottom Two: Cordelia Durango and Lana; Lip-Sync Song: "Quinceañera" by Timbiriche, "Enferma de amor" by Jeans and "El baile del sapito" by Belinda; Eliminated: Cordelia Durango
| 3 | 3 | "La Más Thalía" | 22 May 2018 |
For this week's main challenge, the contestants present a look inspired by Mexican singer Thalía. On the runway, category is La Más Thalía (The Most Thalía). Eva Blunt, Lana and Margaret Y Ya receive positive critiques, with Eva Blunt winning the challenge. Bárbara Durango, Deborah La Grande and Debra Men receive negative critiques, with Deborah La Grande being safe. Bárbara Durango and Debra Men lip-sync to "Arrasando" by Thalía. Bárbara Durango wins the lip-sync and Debra Men is eliminated.: Guest Judge: Alfonso Waithsman; Main Challenge: Present a look inspired by Mexican singer Thalía; Runway Theme: La Más Thalía (The Most Thalía); Challenge Winner: Eva Blunt; Bottom Two: Bárbara Durango and Debra Men; Lip-Sync Song: "Arrasando" by Thalía; Eliminated: Debra Men
| 4 | 4 | "La Más Alebrije" | 29 May 2018 |
For this week's main challenge, the contestants present a look inspired by the bright and colorful folkloristic crafts called Alebrijes. On the runway, category is La Más Alebrije (The Most Alebrije). Deborah La Grande and Margaret Y Ya receive positive critiques, with Margaret Y Ya winning the challenge. Bárbara Durango, Eva Blunt and Lana receive negative critiques, with Eva Blunt being safe. Bárbara Durango and Lana lip-sync to "Cielo rojo" by Regina Orozco. Bárbara Durango wins the lip-sync and Lana is eliminated.: Guest Judge: Regina Orozco; Main Challenge: Present a look inspired by the bright and colorful folkloristic crafts called Alebrijes; Runway Theme: La Más Alebrije (The Most Alebrije); Challenge Winner: Margaret Y Ya; Bottom Two: Bárbara Durango and Lana; Lip-Sync Song: "Cielo rojo" by Regina Orozco; Eliminated: Lana
| 5 | 5 | "La Más Dramática" | 5 June 2018 |
For this week's main challenge, the contestants pair up and act in a scene inspired by the Mexican telenovela Mujeres engañadas.: Bárbara Durango and Eva Blunt; Deborah La Grande and Margaret Y Ya; The runway inspirations were as follows: Bárbara Durango - Támara de la Colina from El Privilegio de Amar; Deborah La Grande - Rosa García from Rosa Salvaje; Eva Blunt - María Guadalupe, María Paula and María Fernanda from Lazos de Amor; Margaret Y Ya - Patito from Patito Feo; On the runway, category is La Más Dramática (The Most Dramatic). Bárbara Durango and Eva Blunt receive positive critiques, with Bárbara Durango winning the challenge. Deborah La Grande and Margaret Y Ya receive negative critiques and are announced as the bottom two. They lip-sync to "Dos mujeres, un camino" by Laura León. Both contestants win the lip-sync and no one goes home.: Guest Judge: Quecho Muñoz; Main Challenge: In pairs, act in a scene inspired by the Mexican telenovela Mujeres engañadas; Runway Theme: La Más Dramática (The Most Dramatic); Challenge Winner: Bárbara Durango; Bottom Two: Deborah La Grande and Margaret Y Ya; Lip-Sync Song: "Dos mujeres, un camino" by Laura León; Eliminated: None
| 6 | 6 | "Día de Muertas" | 12 June 2018 |
All the contestants, after walking the runway on the category Día de Muertas (Day of the Dead), return to talk about what happened this season. Discussions include, Cordelia Durango's real and drag family, Debra Men's upbringing and chola character, Lana Boswell's insecurities during the competition, Deborah La Grande explains her drag name and recounts her theatre background, Eva Blunt's fashion and dancing skills, Bárbara Durango's rocky relationships with many fellow queens, including several contestants, Margaret Y Ya explains her drag name and character, and the Top 4 and their plans for the finale.: Runway Theme: Día de Muertas (Day of the Dead)
| 7 | 7 | "La Gran Final" | 19 June 2018 |
For the final challenge of the season, the contestants produce, direct, and star in their own original performance, and then present a look inspired by Mexican culture. The contestants Mexican Culture inspirations were as follows: Bárbara Durango - Virgen de la Candelaria; Deborah La Grande - Frida Kahlo; Eva Blunt - Tehuana; Margaret Y Ya - Coat of Arms of Mexico; The contestants walk the runway one last time. It is revealed that Debra Men is this season's La Más Querida. It is then revealed that Deborah La Grande is the winner, leaving Bárbara Durango, Eva Blunt and Margaret Y Ya as the runners-up.: Guest Judges: Manunna, Cesar "Teo" Doroteo, Vanessa Claudio, Alex Córdova, Manelyk González, Quique Galdeano and Alfonso Waithsman; Main Challenge: Produce, direct, and star in their own original performance, and then present a look inspired by Mexican culture; Runway Theme: Lo Que Más Amo de México (What I Most Love About Mexico); La Más Querida: Debra Men; Runners-up: Bárbara Durango, Eva Blunt and Margaret Y Ya; Winner of La Más Draga Season One: Deborah La Grande
