= Monjas coronadas =

Mexican Baroque portrait art genre

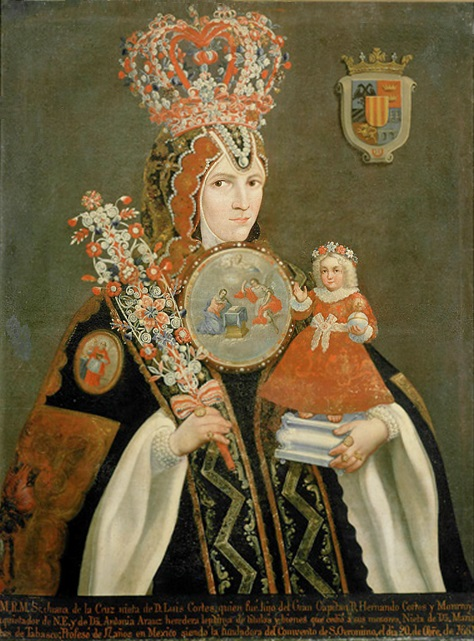
Portrait of Juana Inés de la Cruz, a member of the Hieronymite Order, 18th century, Museum of the Americas, Spain

The Monjas coronadas ("Crowned nuns") is a pictorial genre that emerged during the viceregal period of New Spain in the 17th century, extending into the 18th and 19th centuries. These paintings usually depict novices from New Spain who made their solemn vows, and thus are portrayed after the profession rite with jewels and ornaments. A form of Catholic art, it is associated with Indochristian art. Apart from the novices at their profession are also portraits of nuns at their deathbed or of other key moments of their monastic life.

This New Spanish Baroque pictorial genre from what is today Mexico, represented the graphic importance of the Catholic Church in the world of New Spain, in addition to depicting the nuns' convent life and its characteristics through iconographic representations with elements that allude to mysticism and asceticism, mystical marriage, biblical words, etc.

== Characteristics ==
In all the paintings of the nuns, one can see them dressed and adorned with jewels, flowers and ornaments, wearing crowns or wreaths of these same materials, holding candles, crucifixes, or images of the Infant Jesus. The vast majority are static figures looking down at the ground or the viewer, with a simple background.

== Iconography ==
To begin with, apart from the clear theological interpretation of these paintings, they are surrounded by mystery due to the lack of knowledge about the subject, which opens the way to speculation, making the works fascinating. And it is because of the similarities between the canvases that they seem to give a kind of succession to the entire collection.

Furthermore, the monastic habit in each portrait is different, so they can be classified as "calced" (those with more luxurious attire and jewelry, such as pearls and silver ornaments) and "discalced" (those with more sober attire). And within all the ornaments, we can find the following icongraphy:

Element	Significance
Red rose	Victory over the flesh
White rose	Purity
Jasmine	Simplicity
Carnation	Obedience and pentience
Iris	Purity and chastity
Nardin	Prayer, attribute of Saint Joseph
Butterflies	Resurrection of Christ
Doves	Holy Spirit
Bunch of grapes	Most Precious Blood of Jesus
Sculptures of saints and angels	Allegories of the religious life
Black veil	Mystical wedding to Jesus Christ
Palm	Victory over death
Hairshirts and lit candles	Ascetitism

== Profession ceremony ==
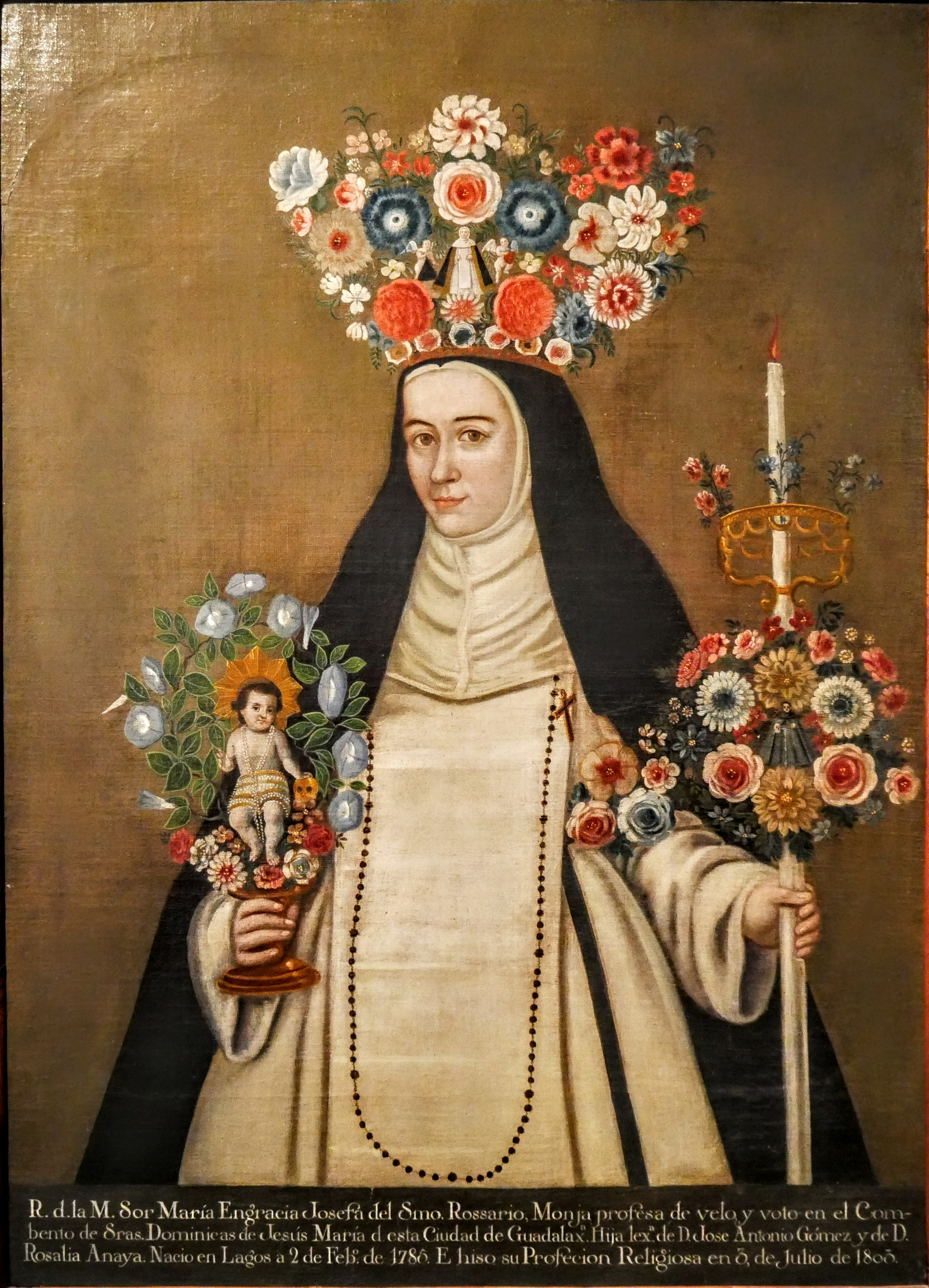
Portrait of María Engracia Josefa del Santísimo Rosario

The profession ceremony symbolizes the mystical marriage with Jesus Christ. Among the most important moments are the declaration of the perpetual vows and the prostration.

Lying on the ground, [the young woman] is covered with white and red rose petals, symbolizing the purity and martyrdom of religious life. The fact that [...] she lies on the ground with her arms outstretched and is materially covered with flower petals also represents her death to the world, or, as they said during the viceregal period, her death in the century. Her family members are responsible for covering the nun under this layer of petals, which they take from previously arranged wicker baskets [...] The nuns' songs are [...] the propitious atmosphere for the event.

—

Antonio Nuñez de Miranda, confessor of Sor Juana Inés de la Cruz, in his Doctrinal Talk explains how he exhorts her to fulfill the vows of chastity, obedience, poverty, and enclosure and describes the steps taken during the ceremony:

The religious community, holding candles, accompanies the future nun to the temple; the "paraninfo" or prelate calls the novice to be married to Christ; the novice ascends to the "talamo," the altar; the "paraninfo" orders her to fulfill the three vows; the novice dresses in mourning, placing the black veil over her head; the betrothal ceremony follows, when the novice is given the ring, the palm, and the crown; The now bride of Christ invokes the Holy Spirit to protect her and, finally, the prelate hands over the nun newly married to God to the prioress of the convent, so that she may take care of her.

—

== Techniques ==
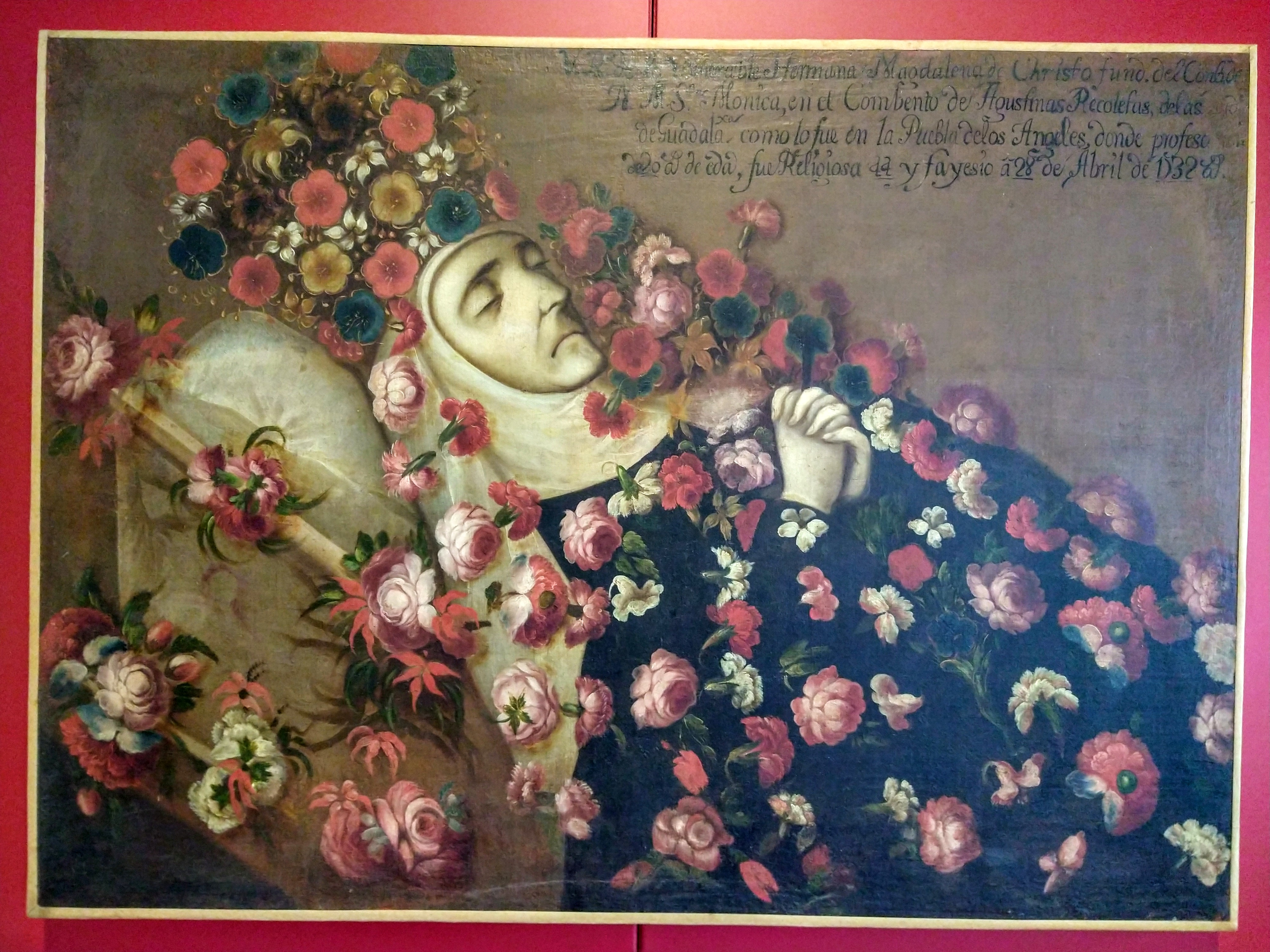
Mortuary portrait of Magdalena de Cristo, located in the Santa Monica Museum of Religious Art

During the viceroyalty, and until shortly afterward, the custom was to make oil portraits of the crowned nuns. However, over time, other techniques such as photography (first in black and white, and later in color) began to be used, and both the paintings and the photographs could only be taken by experts proficient in the respective technique. Currently, photographs are still taken at the coronation and death of nuns, but an expert is no longer required.

The portraits and photographs of coronation ceremonies are very relevant because they show how the tradition of placing a crown and a flowering palm continues in Spanish-American convents today. In numerous convents, there are photographic records of the crown and flowering palm that many of the nuns currently living in seclusion wore during their profession. Similarly, both in Peru and Colombia I was able to observe the practice of photographing the recumbent corpses of nuns who had recently died, who were placed with their wreaths and flowering palms, lying in a sarcophagus or what appeared to be a cot.

—

== See also ==
- Mexican art
- Latin American art
- Spanish art
