= Vanessa Claudio =

Puerto Rican actor and model

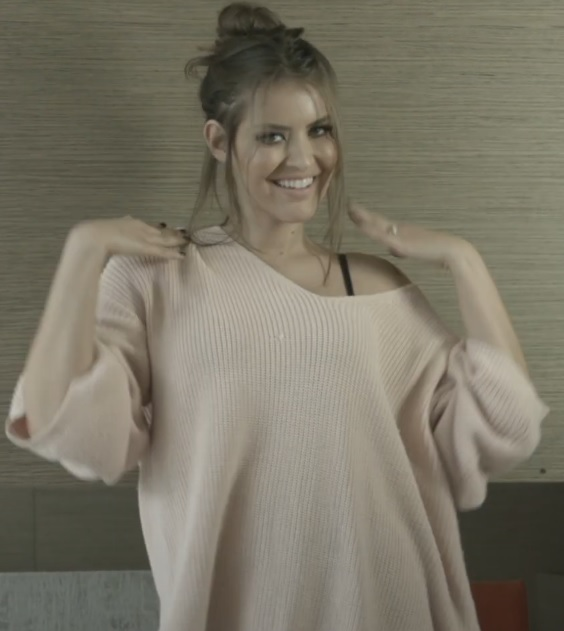
- Born: Vanessa Zayda Claudio Rodríguez; 2 September 1983 (age 42); San Juan, Puerto Rico
- Citizenship: American
- Occupations: Media personality; Model
- Years active: 2001-present
- Partner(s): Israel Amescua (2012); Carlos Arenas (2014-2019)
- Parent(s): Ulpiano Claudio; Vivian Rodríguez

Vanessa Zayda Claudio Rodríguez (born 2 September 1983) is a Puerto Rican television personality, model, and former beauty pageant contestant. She is best known for her role as a presenter on Venga la Alegría, Suelta la Sopa, and El Poder del Amor: Latin America.

== Career ==
=== Beauty pageants ===
Vanessa Claudio represented Puerto Rico at the Miss Intercontinental 2006 beauty pageant, held on 15 October 2006 in Nassau, Bahamas, where she won the titles of first runner-up and Miss Congeniality.

=== Television ===
In 2008, Claudio began her career as a television personality on Azteca Trece (now Azteca Uno) as a reporter on Véngache Pa'cá during its run from September 2008 through 2009. Claudio next became a reporter and contributor on long-running Mexican morning show Venga la Alegría on Azteca Trece in 2009. In July 2012, Claudio also became a host on VLA's sister show Venga el Domingo, broadcast on Sundays, after replacing Michelle Vieth as a panelist on the program which Claudio remained a part of until its end in late 2017.

Claudio was a contestant between June and August 2013 in the dance competition show México Baila on Azteca Trece. She was eliminated in Week 8 but returned for Week 9 as a result of public votes before being eliminated again in Week 10. Claudio would go on to become a panelist on Venga la Alegría, which she continued to host until 7 August 2018, after which she briefly became a sideline reporter between August and September 2018 on the second season of Exatlon Mexico on Azteca Uno, before being replaced by Alex Sirvent.

In 2019, Claudio announced during a 15 February broadcast of Venga la Alegría in an emotional farewell that she was leaving VLA for a new show. Later that day, it was revealed through her Instagram Stories and a promotional teaser on Twitter that Claudio will host the fashion competition reality show Este es mi Estilo on Azteca Uno which would premiere on 25 February. The first season concluded on 15 May; it was the last production worked on by Edith González, who served as a judge, before her death. This same year it was confirmed that she would be the Main host of the second season of the Mexican Drag Queens webshow "La Más Draga", which began its second season on April 30, broadcast on YouTube. Claudio was a host at the Mexicana Universal 2019 beauty pageant which broadcast across three successive Sundays between 6 June and 23 June on Azteca Uno. She next hosted the second season of Este es mi Estilo which aired from 9 September to 30 November.

In 2020, Claudio made an appearance on Venga la Alegría on 31 January, where she announced that she was leaving the network to move to Miami, United States to become a host on Suelta la Sopa on Telemundo. Claudio replaced Verónica Bastos as a panelist on the American morning show, and made her debut on the program on 10 February. Claudio would return to make an appearance as a guest host on VLA on 29 June 2021.

In 2021, Claudio announced during a 30 July broadcast of Suelta la Sopa in an emotional farewell that she was leaving the network for another venture and would be boarding a flight to Turkey later that afternoon. Claudio moved to Istanbul, Turkey where she hosted the dating game show El Poder del Amor: Latin America which aired from 16 August to 19 December. The program was broadcast in several countries across Latin America, including in her native Puerto Rico on WAPA TV.

On 24 January 2022, Claudio returned to Mexico and joined Azteca Uno, once again, now as host of evening show Al Extremo.

=== Acting ===
Claudio has played minor acting roles in Mexican television, having made appearances in El Pantera in July 2008 on Canal 5, and Secretos de familia in May 2013 on Azteca Trece. In 2020, she played the supporting role of Azaneth in the Mexican film Veinteañera, divorciada y fantástica.
