= Recollections of Things to Come =

1963 novel by Elena Garro

- Author: Elena Garro
- Original title: Los recuerdos del porvenir
- Translator: Ruth L. C. Simms
- Language: Spanish
- Genre: Magical realism
- Publisher: Joaquín Mortiz
- Publication date: 1963
- Publication place: Mexico
- English publication date: 1969
- Pages: 295

Recollections of Things to Come (Spanish: Los recuerdos del porvenir) is a 1963 novel by Mexican writer Elena Garro. Inspired by her childhood in Southern Mexico, the novel uses a nonlinear structure to explore themes of historical memory, national identity, and sexism. The fictional town of Ixtepec narrates the story of its military occupation during the Cristero War, a conflict precipitated by attempts to secularize the country following the Mexican Revolution of 1910–1920. The town is able to recall events its inhabitants may not, while the rules of normal time do not always apply.

The manuscript was composed in 1953 and remained in a trunk for several years. Following its partial destruction in a fire, Garro rewrote portions and sent it to the publishing house Joaquín Mortiz. It received positive reviews at the time of publication, but attracted a wider audience only through the work of feminist writers toward the end of the twentieth century. A 1968 film adaptation directed by Alfredo Ripstein, titled Memories of the Future in English, altered significant elements of the novel to avoid criticism of the Mexican government.

Alfaguara issued a new Spanish-language edition with essays by contemporary authors including Guadalupe Nettel in 2019. The 2024 critical edition by Ediciones Cátedra, also in Spanish, contained over 100 pages of new analysis. The Chicago Review of Books describes Garro as "under-translated and under-appreciated".

== Background ==
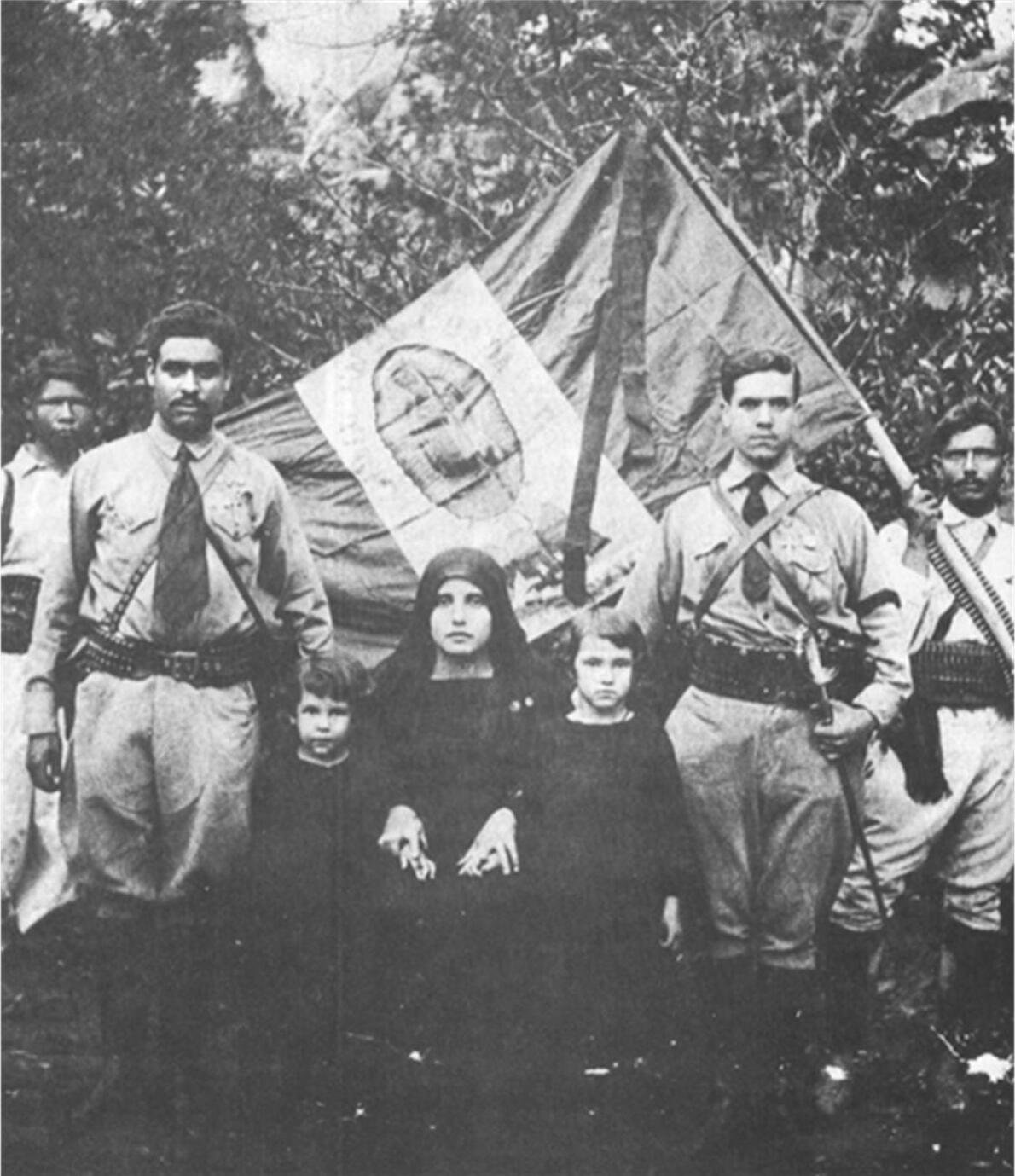
Cristero leaders with a religious banner during the Cristero War (1926–1929).

Garro wrote the novel based on her childhood in Iguala, Guerrero. Her family relocated to the city in 1926, at the start of the Cristero War, a conflict sparked by elements in the Constitution of 1917 limiting the influence of the Catholic Church. She witnessed religious persecution and grew to identify with the struggles of poor and Indigenous communities resisting military repression. This experience formed the backbone of Recollections of Things to Come. It combines the Cristero conflict with an exploration of the interplay between Western and Indigenous worldviews, what Garro called the "duality" of the Mexican countryside.

Garro composed the manuscript over a month in 1953 while hospitalized for myelitis in Bern, Switzerland. The draft was stored in a trunk for nearly a decade, surviving a fire and near-loss in a New York hotel before she reconstructed the lost parts. (Note: The Enciclopedia de la Literatura en México notes that some sources give the date of writing as 1945–1948, when Garro would have been in contact with figures like Jorge Luis Borges. It says the context of the writing is the same and the difference in dates is not great.) Her marriage to Octavio Paz, a future winner of the Nobel Prize in Literature, deteriorated while the manuscript was in storage. He filed for divorce in 1959 in Ciudad Juárez without Garro's knowledge. This was later ruled invalid, complicated by the fact that Garro was underage when they married. Despite their separation and growing professional rivalry, Paz championed Garro's work, delivering the manuscript to Joaquín Díez-Canedo in 1963. His support ensured the novel's release through the publisher Joaquín Mortiz.

The Enciclopedia de la Literatura en México states that the novel's title originates from a line in the poem "Concierto breve" by Carlos Pellicer. Rafael Olea Franco instead suggests that Garro adopted the name of a famous pulquería in Mexico City that was popular among her social circle in the late 1930s. It has also been observed that a bar in Alejo Carpentier's 1953 novel Los pasos perdidos (The Lost Steps) shares the name Garro chose.

The first Spanish edition of the novel was published in 1963 by Joaquín Mortiz, while the English translation by Ruth L. C. Simms was released in 1969 through the University of Texas Press. It has also been translated into Italian (as I ricordi dell'avvenire), German (as Erinnerungen an die Zukunft), and French (as La maîtresse d'Ixtepec and La Fête à Ixtepec).

== Plot summary ==
The town of Ixtepec opens the novel with the line "Aquí estoy, sentado sobre esta piedra aparente. Sólo mi memoria sabe lo que encierra." ("Here I am, sitting on this apparent stone. Only my memory knows what it encloses.") The first half of the story centers on the brutal General Francisco Rosas and his obsession with his mistress, Julia Andrade. Julia remains mentally and emotionally detached from his control. With the help of the mysterious Felipe Hurtado, she escapes during a magical suspension of time.

The second half tells of the town's efforts to conceal the local priest from persecution. Juan Moncada is killed and his brother Nicolás executed. Isabel Moncada realizes she is unable to give up her feelings for General Rosas, despite the devastation he has brought upon her family. She chooses Rosas over the desire for a spiritual cure and is transformed into the "apparent stone" from the beginning of the story. Her former maid, Gregoria, finds the petrified body and views the event as divine punishment. Isabel's voice ends the story: "Aquí estaré con mi amor a solas como recuerdo del porvenir por los siglos de los siglos." ("Here I will be alone with my love as a recollection of things to come for ever and ever.")

== Themes and style ==
=== Narrative structure ===
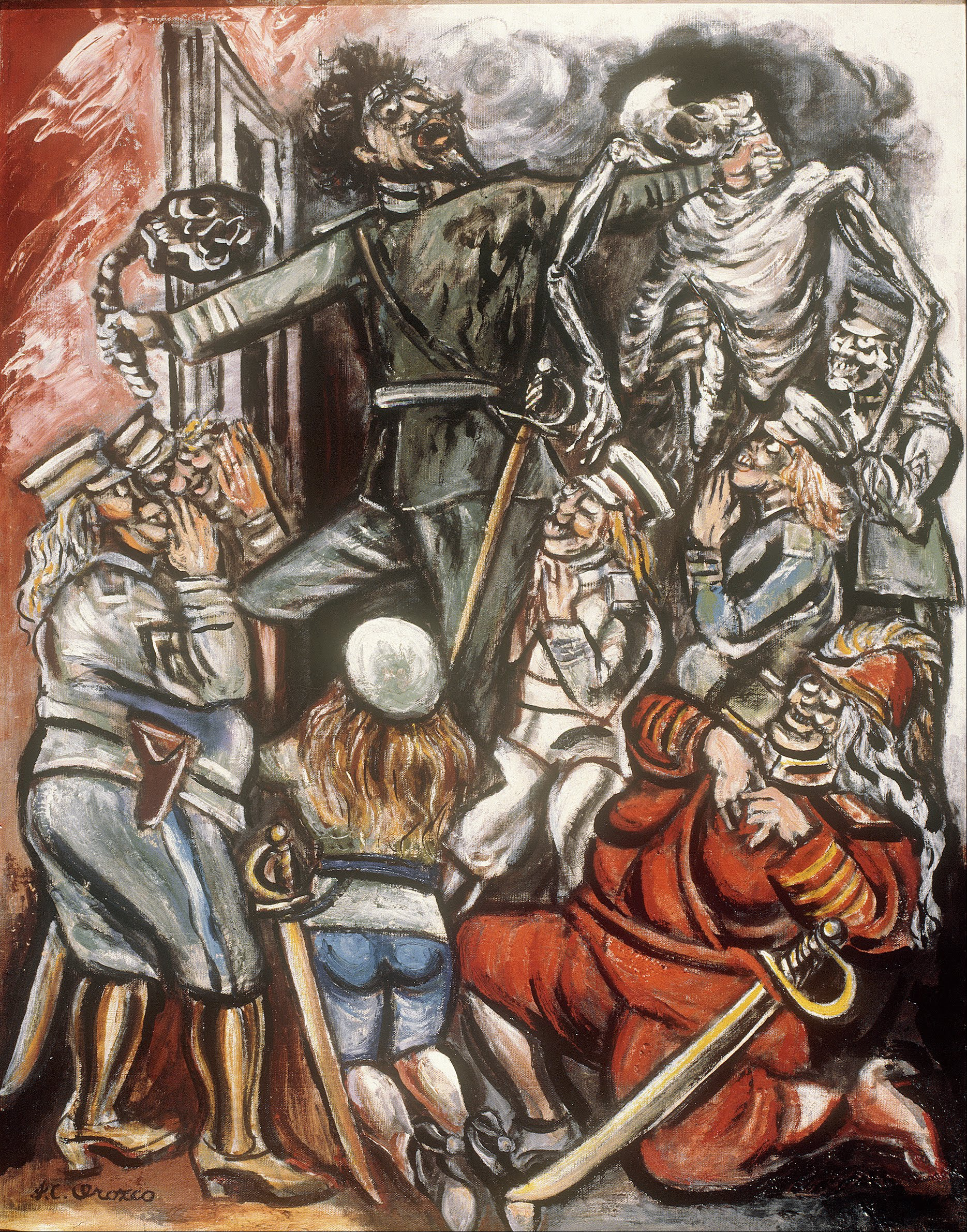
The Demagogue (1930) by José Clemente Orozco.

Recollections of Things to Come, published in 1963, is regarded as a forerunner of Latin American magical realism. It evokes frequent comparisons to One Hundred Years of Solitude, published four years later. In their critical edition, Esteban and Aparicio review attempts to categorize Garro's work, including her frustration with the male-dominated Latin American Boom and her belief that similar techniques had existed in Mexico for centuries. (Note: Garro distanced herself from the commercialization of magical realism. She once said, "Perdóname que lo diga. Y nomás por no escribir entre esa banda de pendejos yo ya no quiero volver a escribir jamás nada mágico. Han echado a perder toda la posibilidad de novela en América Latina con tanto realismo y tanta magia." (Forgive me for saying this. And just for not writing among that bunch of idiots, I don't want to write anything magical ever again. They've ruined every possibility of a novel in Latin America with so much realism and so much magic.)) They situate Garro alongside Juan Rulfo and Laura Esquivel in "a distinctly Mexican conception of the convergence of different realities, normalized through an aesthetic and technical device that we might call magical realism".

Ixtepec narrates events in a voice using both the first-person singular ("I") and the first-person plural ("we"). Its inhabitants exist outside of normal time, and only the interruption of external forces shifts their reality. Memory serves as a vehicle for the town to identify itself. This focus on collective memory explores how one generation inevitably repeats the acts of the previous one, which renders conventional historical records problematic.

The town's narration presents an alternative to Western views of history as a progressive sequence of unique events. Rather than unfolding as a linear progression, Ixtepec's experience of time allows the past, present, and future to overlap and coexist within a fixed present. Garro credited her understanding of time as a cyclical or simultaneous phenomenon to the influence of her father, who was familiar with Buddhism, and the Nahua women who helped raise her.

=== Historical context ===
The novel depicts the period of state-building that followed the Mexican Revolution of 1910–1920. Porfirio Díaz had ruled the country as a dictator in a period of relative peace known as the Porfiriato (1876–1910), and Recollections of Things to Come takes place in a time of uncertainty about the country's democratic future. It portrays revolutionary generals, entrenched landowners, and the Catholic hierarchy as conspiring to suppress the peasantry rather than implement land reform. The novel contains frequent references to historical figures such as Plutarco Elías Calles and depicts the impact of the 1926 Calles Law, which led to the government-ordered closure of churches. The narrative distinguishes between individual religious faith and the Catholic Church as an institution. While the hierarchy is shown as complicit with the ruling elite, local outcasts are often the only characters who demonstrate empathy for the persecuted.

The character of Martín Moncada mentions that the country has endured a "long night" of national turmoil since the assassination of President Francisco I. Madero in 1913. The narrative voice critiques the political maneuvering of the 1920s, suggesting that the conflict between the government and the Catholic Church was a distraction from the subject of land redistribution. The military is depicted as committing acts of violence and murder against the peasantry, whether out of boredom or a sense of professional obligation. Meanwhile, the town-narrator watches high-ranking Church officials play cards with the families of government officials. Esteban and Aparicio characterize the effect as a "petrified" experience of time, forcing the community to relive past violence as its only possible future.

=== Gender ===
Unlike earlier literature on the Mexican Revolution, Recollections of Things to Come portrays women as active participants rather than passive figures. Early in the novel, Isabel Moncada describes the cultural expectation of marriage as a "humiliation", and her dependence on General Francisco Rosas becomes a complex betrayal of both her family and her community. The novel thus challenges machismo by giving voice to the collective resentments of women living under patriarchal rule. Garro described her work as feminist, saying that "the women are rebels and if a woman is a rebel then she is a feminist".

Sarah E. L. Bowskill notes that the narrative resists categorizing women's transgressive behavior through archetypes such as La Malinche, the Indigenous interpreter to Hernán Cortés associated with betrayal. While characters such as Gregoria use these myths to explain away female rebellion and re-establish male authority, the narrative voice keeps women's motives enigmatic. Sandra Messinger Cypess puts the novel in dialogue with Octavio Paz's depiction of La Malinche in The Labyrinth of Solitude as a passive and violated victim. By presenting older archetypes as "culturally determined" rather than inescapable fates, the novel offers an alternative to narratives of female submission. Bowskill argues that female participation in the conflict disrupts traditional models of domesticity and social order.

== Reception ==
The Catholic followers of Porfirio Díaz and the atheistic revolutionaries were digging the grave of agrarian reform together. —Recollections of Things to Come, translated by Ruth L. C. Simms, p. 148, as quoted by McMurray.

Recollections of Things to Come shared the 1963 Xavier Villaurrutia Prize with La feria by Juan José Arreola. A positive 1965 review in Books Abroad distinguished Garro's use of time from contemporaries like Arreola. "The author recognizes history and time, but refuses to concede them hegemony over man." Writing in The Austin American in 1969, C. Richard King observed that Garro's background in theater and film was evident in the novel's structure, which he compared to a "pageant", though he felt some of the work's theatrical "music" was lost in the transition to paper. Also in 1969, John S. Brushwood said that the first-person narration by Ixtepec "sometimes rings a bit false" but the mix of realistic and fantastical elements worked. He suggested that the novel "may be one of those sleepers that future generations will repeatedly enjoy discovering".

Garro's reputation collapsed following the Tlatelolco massacre of 1968. Under pressure from the Mexican government, Garro accused left-wing intellectuals of inciting student violence. Her public statements and reports that she served as a government informant led fellow writers to label her a "snitch" (delatora) and she went into self-imposed exile. During this time, Mexican literary juries were often hesitant to recognize her work for fear of offending her influential ex-husband, Octavio Paz. Their intertwined legacies remain a subject of debate. Garro remained known as a playwright in the 1970s, but her prose received little scholarly attention. A 1980 analysis called Recollections of Things to Come "notoriously subversive" for its cynical view of the post-revolutionary Mexican government while noting its obscurity.

Feminist writers brought Recollections of Things to Come and Garro's prose to greater attention toward the end of the twentieth century. A 1987 review in The New York Times Book Review positioned its "warping" and "stopping" of time within the tradition of magical realism and described the overall effect as "luminous and affecting". A review of the 2019 text in El Tiempo said that the book had "not lost an iota of [its] originality" and questioned why Garro had not been included in the canon of Latin American literature. The author suggested that "the machismo of the intellectual world of her time" had left Garro in the shadow of Paz and her later lover, Adolfo Bioy Casares.

In twenty-first-century scholarship, Recollections of Things to Come has been recognized as an important piece of Mexican literature from the second half of the twentieth century. It has received the most scholarly attention of Garro's works, with The Cambridge Companion to the Latin American Novel calling it her "masterpiece" and noting its importance as a once-neglected work by a woman writer. On its sixtieth anniversary in 2023, Olivia Vázquez-Medina told La Jornada that the book's gender commentary resonated with contemporary audiences more than other novels of the "boom" era. The author also felt that Garro's close connection to nature and refusal to "put the human at the center of the universe" had remained surprisingly relevant for an author of her time.

== Legacy ==
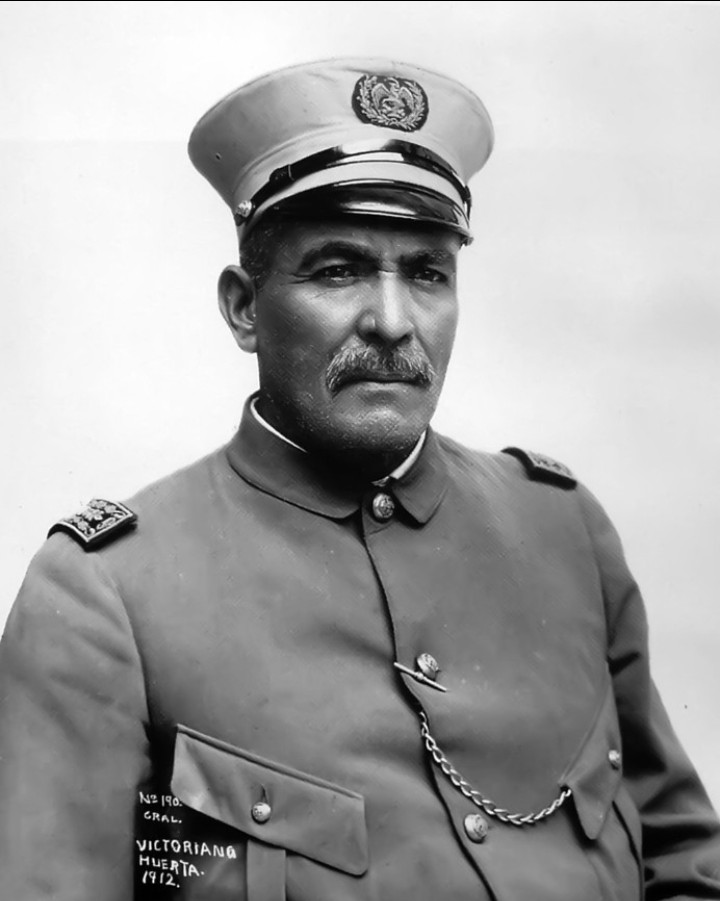
The film takes place during the dictatorship of Victoriano Huerta to avoid criticizing democratic factions in the Mexican Revolution.

Alfredo Ripstein directed a film adaptation titled Los recuerdos del porvenir (Memories of the Future) in 1968. At the time, the Mexican government was attempting to glorify the Mexican Revolution and increase the country's cinematic prestige. To avoid the political and religious controversies associated with the Cristero War, the film was set in 1913–1914, during the early revolutionary era. While Garro's original text depicts the post-revolutionary government repressing the townspeople, the film portrays revolutionaries being repressed by the brief military dictatorship of Victoriano Huerta. Garro called the adaptation "horrible" and "garbage" (porquería), saying it betrayed the novel. Iris Pascual Gutiérrez observes that even Ripstein considered the film a failure while Agustín Zarzosa calls it an "expensive flop".

In the late 2010s, Alfaguara began a project to increase Garro's visibility outside Mexico. Her Complete Stories, published in 2016, included two unpublished works. The 2019 Spanish edition of Recollection of Things to Come included new essays by authors from Argentina, Chile, Colombia, Mexico, and Spain, among them Guadalupe Nettel. Mayra González Olvera, literary director of Alfaguara, said there would be 5,000 copies. Nettel felt that literary scholarship had failed to recognize Elena Garro and predicted that the book would be at the "head of that literary canon that we are reconstructing" by midcentury. For the novel's 60th anniversary in 2023, the Guadalajara International Book Fair organized a seven-hour public reading marathon and distributed free copies to participants.

Ediciones Cátedra published a critical anniversary edition in 2024 with over 100 pages of new analysis by Ángel Esteban and Yannelys Aparicio. Aparicio presented their work at the Association of Academies of the Spanish Language and wrote in Nueva Revista de Política, Cultura y Arte that Garro's book "has gone unnoticed outside Mexico until very recently". A review by Hana Riebová in Romanica Olomucensia praised the 2024 edition's intellectual rigor. It argued that Garro's style of magical realism was earlier and more "authentic" than that of most of her contemporaries, suggesting she be read alongside landmarks like Carpentier's The Lost Steps and Rulfo's Pedro Páramo.

In 2025, Two Lines Press published a translation of Jazmina Barrera's Elena Garro biography as The Queen of Swords and Garro's short story collection La semana de colores as The Week of Colors. The 1969 Simms text remained the only English translation of Recollections of Things to Come at that time. The Chicago Review of Books referred to Garro as "under-translated and under-appreciated" in a review of the short story collection.

== Bibliography ==
- Balderston, Daniel (January 1989). "The New Historical Novel: History and Fantasy in "Los recuerdos del porvenir"". Bulletin of Hispanic Studies. 66 (1): 41. doi:10.3828/bhs.66.1.41.
- Barrera, Jazmina (2025). The Queen of Swords. Translated by MacSweeney, Christina (ebook ed.). Two Lines Press. ISBN 978-1949641882.
- Bowskill, Sarah E. L. (2009). "Women, Violence, and the Mexican Cristero Wars in Elena Garro's Los Recuerdos Del Porvenir and Dolores Castro's La Ciudad Y El Viento". The Modern Language Review. 104 (2): 438–452. ISSN 0026-7937. JSTOR 25654864. Full access available to users of The Wikipedia Library.
- Cypess, Sandra Messinger (2012). Uncivil wars: Elena Garro, Octavio Paz, and the battle for cultural memory (1st ed.). Austin: University of Texas Press. doi:10.7560/737778. ISBN 978-0-292-73778-5.
- Dauster, Frank (1980). "Elena Garro y sus recuerdos del porvenir" [Elena Garro and her recollections of things to come]. Journal of Spanish Studies: Twentieth Century (in Spanish). 8 (1/2): 57–65. ISSN 0092-1807. JSTOR 27740919. Full access available to users of The Wikipedia Library.
- Garro, Elena; Esteban, Ángel; Aparicio, Yannelys (2024). Los recuerdos del porvenir (in Spanish). Madrid: Catedra. ISBN 978-84-376-4805-7.
- Pascual Gutiérrez, Iris (2018). "Memorias y olvidos en torno a la historia de México: la Revolución en la novela Los recuerdos del porvenir (Elena Garro,1963) y su adaptación cinematográfica" [Memories and Omissions About the History of Mexico: The Revolution in the Novel Recollections of Things to Come and its Movie Adaptation]. Acta Iassyensia Comparationis (in Spanish): 123–132. ISSN 2285-3871.
- Riebová, Markéta (23 December 2025). "Esteban, Ángel – Aparicio, Yannelys (2024), «Introducción», en Garro, E., Los recuerdos del porvenir, Madrid: Ediciones Cátedra, 11–125". Romanica Olomucensia (in Spanish). 37 (2): 409–414. doi:10.5507/ro.2025.027.
