= El gallo de oro (disambiguation) =

El gallo de oro ("The Golden Cockerel") may refer to:

- El gallo de oro (novel), a short novel by Mexican writer Juan Rulfo, published in 1980
- El gallo de oro (film), a 1964 motion-picture adaptation of the novel, directed by Roberto Gavaldón
- El gallo de oro (TV series), a 2023 television series based on the novel
- Mexican singer Valentín Elizalde (1979–2006) was nicknamed "El Gallo de Oro"

== See also ==
- Golden Cockerel (disambiguation)
