= Toruño =

Toruño is a Spanish surname. Notable people with the surname include:

- Isidro Téllez Toruño (born 1948), Nicaraguan politician and trade unionist
- Johanna Toruño (born 1989), queer Salvadoran artist
- Juan Felipe Toruño (1898–1980), Nicaraguan writer
- Rhina Toruño Haensly (1948–2022), Salvadoran scholar and teacher
- Rodolfo Quezada Toruño (1932–2012), Guatemalan Catholic prelate
