= Golden Cockerel =

Golden Cockerel may refer to:

- Golden Cockerel Press, an English fine press operating between 1920 and 1961
- The Golden Cockerel, an opera by Nikolai Rimsky-Korsakov

(based on The Tale of the Golden Cockerel by Alexander Pushkin)

- The Goldener Hahn, a ceremonial goblet in Münster, Germany
- The Golden Cockerel (novel), a short novel by Mexican writer Juan Rulfo
- The Golden Cockerel (radio play), a 1951 Australian production on the life of Pushkin

== See also ==
- Golden Rooster Awards, Chinese film awards
- The Golden Rooster, an 1870 Armenian novel by Hakob Melik Hakobian "Raffi"
- The Golden Rooster (artwork), formerly on display in the U.S. state of Nevada
