= Melisa Berenice Nungaray Blanco =

Mexican author and journalist

- Born: September 29, 1998 (age 27); Guadalajara; Jalisco
- Other name: Melissa Nungaray
- Occupations: writer, poet
- Notable work: El cielo cae a voces (2023)

Melisa Berenice Nungaray Blanco (born September 29, 1998) is a Mexican poet, writer, editor, and cultural promoter. She has gained recognition for her early entry into literature and her prolific career in contemporary poetry in Mexico and abroad.

== Biography ==
Melisa Nungaray was born in Guadalajara, Jalisco. She holds a degree in Hispanic Language and Literature from the Universidad Autónoma del Estado de México, where she graduated with honors with the thesis El viaje mítico y místico en el poema extenso Migraciones (1976–2020) de Gloria Gervitz. She is currently pursuing a master's degree in Humanities-Literary Studies at the same university.

She published her first poetry book at the age of seven, titled Raíz del cielo (2005). Since then, she has developed a prolific literary career, participating in events, conferences, and poetry festivals at both national and international levels. Her texts have been translated into Greek, Italian, and Uzbek.

Between 2002 and 2011, she collaborated on the program Dimensión Colorida on Radio Universidad de Guadalajara, conducting reports, interviews, and narrating stories. She has also participated in other radio programs such as Teleférico, De pico picorendo, and Jalisco en la hora nacional. In 2014, she collaborated on the Perfil Cultura supplement of the newspaper Mural, conducting interviews during the Guadalajara International Book Fair.

Since her first publication, Nungaray has given lectures and talks on reading promotion at various educational institutions. She has participated in literary meetings such as the First National Meeting of Poets in Mariano Escobedo, Veracruz (2016); the VII Transvolcanic Poetry Meeting (2016); the 3rd and 4th Ibero-American Letters Fair in Toluca (2016, 2017); and the Mexico International Poetry Festival (2018), among others.

In 2014, she won second place in the IV National Young Poetry Prize "Jorge Lara". In 2017, she was a grantee of the Interfaz ISSSTE-Cultura Los Signos en Rotación Festival in San Luis Potosí.

Nungaray is the director of the literary magazine En la Masmédula (www.enlamasmedula.com), a space dedicated to promoting contemporary literature. Additionally, she collaborates in various digital publications such as Diario16, Diario Siglo XXI, Revista Todo Literatura, and El Siglo.

== Selected publications ==
- Raíz del cielo (author). Mexico: Secretaría de Cultura de Jalisco/Literalia, 2005
- Alba-vigia (author). México: La Zonámbula, 2008
- Sentencia del fuego (author). México: La Cartonera, 2011
- Travesía: Entidad del cuerpo (author). México: La Zonámbula, 2014
- El cielo cae a voces (author). México: Secretaría de Cultura y Turismo del Gobierno del Estado de México/Universidad Autónoma del Estado de México, 2023

== Awards ==
- Premio Nacional de Poesía Joven Jorge Lara 2014, awarded by the Secretaría de la Cultura y las Artes (Sedeculta)
- Honorable Mention in the Caminos de la Libertad Award 2022, 13th Youth Competition. Issued by Centro Ricardo B. Salinas Pliego (Centro RBS).

== Participation in Events and Conferences ==
Throughout her career, Melissa Nungaray has participated in numerous literary gatherings and book fairs at both national and international levels. In 2006, she presented her first book, Raíz del cielo, at the Capilla Elías Nandino of the Ex Convento del Carmen and the Guadalajara International Book Fair. In later years, she gained recognition with the presentation of Alba-vigía (2008) and Travesía: Entidad del cuerpo (2014) in venues such as the José Luis Martínez Bookstore of the Fondo de Cultura Económica. She has been invited to the International Book Fair of the Palacio de Minería, the Guadalajara International Book Fair, and the Yucatán International Reading Fair, where she has given lectures and readings of her work. Additionally, she has participated in literary events such as the Writers' Meeting for Ciudad Juárez in Ecatepec and the Transvolcanic Poetry Gathering. Her cultural promotion efforts also include collaborations in the Perfil Cultura supplement of Mural newspaper and initiatives to encourage reading in educational institutions.

== Influence and Recognition ==
Melissa Nungaray has been mentioned in various publications as one of Mexico's most outstanding young writers. Her work has been included in the Encyclopedia of Literature in Mexico and in the Dictionary of 21st Century Mexican Writers. Additionally, she is featured in the Spanish Fonoteca of Contemporary Poetry, further solidifying her influence in contemporary poetry.
