= El Llano en llamas =

1953 collection of short stories by Mexican author Juan Rulfo

- First edition (FCE)
- Author: Juan Rulfo
- Original title: El llano en llamas
- Translator: George D. Schade (1971); Ilan Stavans & Harold Augenbraum (2012); Stephen Beechinor (2019); Douglas J. Weatherford (2024)
- Language: Spanish
- Genre: Short story collection
- Publisher: Fondo de Cultura Económica
- Publication date: 1953
- Publication place: Mexico City
- Pages: 170 pp
- ISBN: 978-0-292-70132-8
- OCLC: 20956761

El Llano en llamas (Note: The capitalization of llano varies from one edition to the next. Rulfo's manuscript and the first edition used lowercase and uppercase indistinctly; after the author's revision of the second edition (1980), a capital "L" is consistently used, as a specific reference to the Llano Grande region of southern Jalisco.) is a collection of short stories written by Mexican author Juan Rulfo. Four English translations have been published:

- The Burning Plain and Other Stories (University of Texas Press, 1971), translated by George D. Schade.
- The Plain in Flames (University of Texas Press, 2012), translated by Ilan Stavans and Harold Augenbraum.
- El Llano in flames (Structo Press, 2019), translated by Stephen Beechinor.
- The Burning Plain (University of Texas Press, 2024), translated by Douglas J. Weatherford.

The stories were written over several years for different literary magazines, starting in 1945 with "They Gave Us the Land". The collection itself was first published in 1953 by the Fondo de Cultura Económica as part of the collection Letras Mexicanas. After its publication, two other stories, "The Legacy of Matilde Arcángel" and "The Day of the Collapse", were included in its second edition in 1970.

The stories in the book are set in the harsh countryside of the state of Jalisco where Rulfo was raised, with the context of post-Mexican Revolution events such as the distribution of ejidos after the land reform and the Cristero War. They explore the tragic lives of the area's inhabitants who suffer from extreme poverty, family discord, and crime. With a few bare phrases the author conveys a feeling for the bleak, harsh surroundings in which his people live.

== Literary reputation of the author ==
This collection and a novel entitled Pedro Páramo, published within three years of each other in the 1950s, established Rulfo's literary reputation. One review of these stories praises these seventeen tales of rural folk because they "prove Juan Rulfo to be one of the master storytellers of modern Mexico". The reviewer also noted that Rulfo

- has an eye for the depths of the human soul,
- an ear for the 'still sad music of humanity',
- and a gift for communicating what takes place internally and externally in man.

== Range of writing styles in these stories ==
- brief anecdotes
- casual incidents that remind one of 'happenings' in pop art
- short stories. (According to one reviewer, many of these stories are written in deceptively elemental language and narrative technique.)

In his introduction to the Texas edition, translator George D. Schade describes some of the stories as long sustained interior monologues ("Macario", "We're very poor", "Talpa", "Remember"), while in other stories that may have otherwise been essentially monologues dialogues are inserted ("Luvina", "They have Given Us the Land" and "Anacleto Morones"). A few stories, according to Schade, are scarcely more than anecdotes, such as "The Night They Left Him Alone".

== Mentioned in a Nobel Lecture, 2008 ==
The French writer J. M. G. Le Clézio, who was the 2008 Nobel literature laureate, mentioned in his Nobel Lecture not only the writer Juan Rulfo, but also the short stories from El llano en llamas and the novel Pedro Páramo.

== Stories ==
| # | Original Spanish | English translation (1) Schade; (2) Stavans & Augenbraum; (3) Weatherford | First publication |
|---|---|---|---|
| 1 | Nos han dado la tierra | 1. They gave us the land 2. They Have Given Us the Land; 3. They Have Given Us the Land | Pan Magazine, Issue 2, July 1945 |
| 2 | La cuesta de las comadres | 1. The Hill of the Comadres; 2. Comadre Hill; 3. La Cuesta de las Comadres | América Magazine, Issue 55, February 1948 |
| 3 | Es que somos muy pobres | 1. We're very poor 2. It's Because We're So Poor; 3. Because We’re So Poor | América Magazine, Issue 54, August 1947 |
| 4 | El hombre | 1. The man 2. The Man; 3. The Man | First edition, 1953 |
| 5 | En la madrugada | 1. At daybreak 2. At Dawn; 3. In the Early Morning | First edition, 1953 |
| 6 | Talpa | Talpa | América Magazine, Issue 62, January 1950 |
| 7 | Macario | Macario | Pan Magazine, Issue 6, November 1945 |
| 8 | El llano en llamas | 1. The burning Plain; 2. The Plain in Flames; 3. The Burning Plain | América Magazine, Issue 64, December 1950 |
| 9 | ¡Diles que no me maten! | 1. Tell them not to kill me!; 2. Tell Them Not to Kill Me!; 3. Tell Them Not to Kill Me! | América Magazine, Issue 66, June 1951 |
| 10 | Luvina | Luvina | First edition, 1953 |
| 11 | La noche que lo dejaron solo | 1. The night they left him alone 2. The Night They Left Him Alone; 3. The Night They Left Him Alone | First edition, 1953 |
| 12 | Paso del Norte | Paso del Norte | First edition, 1953 |
| 13 | Acuérdate | Remember | First edition, 1953 |
| 14 | ¿No oyes ladrar los perros? | 1. No dogs bark 2. You Don't Hear Dogs Barking; 3. You Don't Hear Dogs Barking | First edition, 1953 |
| 15 | Anacleto Morones | Anacleto Morones | First edition, 1953 |
| 16 | La herencia de Matilde Arcángel | 1. —; 2. The Legacy of Matilde Arcángel; 3. The Legacy of Matilde Arcángel | Second edition, 1970 |
| 17 | El día del derrumbe | 1. —; 2. The Day of the Collapse; 3. The Day of the Collapse | Second edition, 1970 |

=== Macario ===
"Macario" is written as a monologue, where a titular orphaned town idiot Macario describes in his flowing narrative a few of the special aspects of his everyday life. The past and present mingle chaotically, and frequently the most startling associations of ideas are juxtaposed, strung together by conjunctions which help to paralyze the action and stop the flow of time in the present. This helps to establish the sickly atmosphere surrounding the idiot boy, who is gnawed by hunger and filled with the terror of hell, and is protected, as well as exploited, by his godmother and the servant girl Felipa.

=== Nos han dado la tierra ===
The story speaks of four countrymen, who have abandoned their homes. They are marching across a sun-baked barren plain in order to reach a parcel of land they were given as part of the government's land reform program. However, as they reach their property, they find out the land they were given is too hard and far away from any water source to have any practical use. When they complain to the deputy about it, he apathetically tells them they shouldn't attack the government that gave them the land, and they're left to wonder what to do.

=== La cuesta de las comadres ===
The story is narrated by a man described as "the last inhabitant of the Hill", a village formerly controlled by the feared criminals and now-deceased Torrico brothers. During the land reform, the sixty original inhabitants were given equal plots of land. However, the Torrico brothers forced the rest of the villagers to give up their land and everything they produced within it, driving them all out. When there was nobody but the narrator and the brothers left, the Torricos turned to highway robbery, which ultimately caused their deaths.

=== Es que somos muy pobres ===
The story starts with the line "Everything is going from bad to worse here". The narrator speaks about the hardships that his family has recently had to endure, which included the death of his Aunt Jacinta the previous week. During the burial, he says that "it began raining like never before".

=== El hombre ===
The story is split into two parts. The first part is narrated in third person, and alternates between descriptions of two different people: a fugitive "man" and his "pursuer", often referred to as "the one who was following him".

=== En la madrugada ===
The story begins with an eerie description of the town of San Gabriel. The town "emerges from the fog laden with dew", and the narrator describes a number of elements that serve to obscure it from view: clouds, rising steam and black smoke from the kitchens.

=== Talpa ===
"Talpa" is narrated in the third person by a nameless character, who is described only as the brother of Tanilo and the lover of Tanilo's wife, Natalia. The story begins at what is technically its end, with a description of Natalia throwing herself into her mother's arms and sobbing upon their return to Zenzontla. The narrator recounts how Tanilo was ill and covered in painful blisters. Natalia and the narrator planned to bring Tanilo to the town of Talpa, ostensibly so he could be cured by the Virgin of Talpa. However, in reality, they hoped he would die so they could continue their extramarital relationship without guilt. After Tanilo's death, however, Natalia refuses to speak to the narrator out of shame. The narrator concludes that he and Natalia must live with remorse and the memory of Tanilo's death as he watches Natalia cry with her mother. It was adapted for the cinema as Talpa in 1956 and, together with elements from Pedro Páramo and "¡Diles que no me maten!", as Los confines in 1987.

=== El llano en llamas ===
The story begins with an epigraph from a popular ballad, the lines "They've gone and killed the bitch / but the puppies still remain". This refers to the way that the spark that began the Mexican Revolution created successive movements, which were often quite independent of its original impulses and were often difficult to bring to heel.

=== ¡Diles que no me maten! ===
The story is about a man named Juvencio Nava, who pleads with his son Justino to intervene on his behalf in order to stop his execution by firing squad. Juvencio is about to be executed by a colonel for the murder of a man, Don Lupe, forty years earlier. The conflict arose when Don Lupe would not allow Juvencio to let his livestock graze on his land, but Juvencio ignored the other man. His prison guard happens to be the son of the man he killed. Published as the seventh story in 1951 with a preface by Elias Canetti and Günter Grass. Together with elements from Pedro Páramo and "Talpa", it was filmed as Los confines in 1987.

=== Luvina ===
Like other stories in the collection, "Luvina" is written in the form of a confession. The narrator is someone who previously taught in the town of Luvina, speaking to the new teacher who is about to travel there to replace them. This is not revealed until midway through the story, however.

=== La noche que lo dejaron solo ===
This story takes place between 1926 and 1929 during the Cristero War. It is told in the third person by an omniscient narrator, who describes the flight of a Cristero soldier, Feliciano Ruelas, from a successful ambush of federal troops. When they cannot locate him, they kill his family members instead.

=== Acuérdate ===
The narrator begins by describing a man named Urbano Gómez. He had died around fifteen years before, but he was a very memorable man. He was often called “Grandfather” by others around him. One of his sons, Fidencio, had two "frisky" daughters, one of which had the mean nickname of "Stuck Up". The other daughter was tall and blue-eyed and many said she wasn't his.

=== ¿No oyes ladrar los perros? ===
The story opens with a father's request that his son Ignacio tell him if he can hear any dogs or see any lights in the distance, as he is very nearly deaf and blind. The man is carrying his estranged adult wounded son on his back to find a doctor. Ignacio tells him that he doesn't hear any dogs or see anything, which doesn't satisfy his father. Ignacio is tired, begging for water and food, but the man cannot give these to him. He grows frustrated with his son, revealing that Ignacio was a criminal who began robbing others due to their family's poverty, using the money to buy food. However, Ignacio eventually robbed and killed his father's best friend Tranquilino, leading to his hatred of him. He tells him he is only helping him for the sake of Ignacio's late mother. At the end, Ignacio realizes that there were, indeed, dogs barking in the distance, before dying from his injuries. It was filmed as ¿No oyes ladrar los perros? in 1975.

=== Paso del Norte ===
A father asks his son where he is headed, and learns his destination is "up North". The son's pig-buying business has failed, and his family is starving. The son says the father can not understand his family’s suffering because he sells "skyrockets and firecrackers and gunpowder", which are popular whenever there are holiday celebrations. The business in pigs is more seasonal, and therefore less successful.

=== Anacleto Morones ===
One of the longer stories in this collection, it is told in first person by the character of Lucas Lucatero. Lucatero begins the story by cursing the women who have come to visit him. He is prideful and jealous, and though he does not confess to the crime directly, the repeated references to a pile of stones indicate the resting place of Anacleto Morones, Lucatero's father-in-law.

=== La herencia de Matilde Arcángel ===
This is one of two short stories that the author added to the second edition of the Spanish language collection in 1970. The final version of the collection has 17 short stories.

=== El día del derrumbe ===
This is one of two short stories that the author added to the second edition of the Spanish language collection in 1970. The final version of the collection has 17 short stories.
