= La culpa es de los tlaxcaltecas =

La culpa es de los tlaxcaltecas (Blame the Tlaxcaltecs) is a short story by Elena Garro, published by in 1964 as part of the collection La Semana de Colores. In the work, Garro uses magical realism in order to convey a message about the role of women in society. The work has been described as a subversion and re-writing of the Mexican epic narrative of La Malinche.

== Plot summary ==
The story begins when Laura Aldama recounts to Nacha, her native housekeeper, about her trip to Guanajuato with her mother-in-law Margarita. After running out of gas on the bridge over Lake Cuitzeo, Margarita goes to find gas allowing Laura to escape to be with her 16th century Aztec husband, or "primo marido". In the 16th century Laura is part of the Spanish war, led by Hernán Cortés, against the Aztec civilization in Tenochtitlan. Returning to her life in 20th century Mexico City, Laura feels guilty and torn between her two lives. Laura goes back to meet her "primo marido" despite her 20th century husband's (Pablo Aldama) will and physically abusive reaction. Laura continues to see the suffering of her "primo marido" from his war wounds. The story ends with an open ending as Laura leaves with her "primo marido" and Nacha decides to leave the house as well.
