= Philippe Monneret =

French linguist

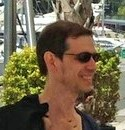
- Scientific career
- Fields: linguistics, cognitive science
- Workplaces: Paris-Sorbonne University
- Website: Philippe Monneret

Philippe Monneret (born 1962) is a French linguist. He is Professor of Linguistics at University of Burgundy since 2004 and at Paris-Sorbonne University since 2015. In 2003, he founded Les Cahiers de Linguistique Analogique and created the field of analogical linguistics (« linguistique analogique »). He is a member of the editorial board of «Romanica Olomucensia».

== Books ==
- Questions de syntaxe française (with René Rioul, PUF, Paris, 1999)
- Exercices de linguistique (PUF, Paris, 1999, 2007, 2014)
- Notions de linguistique théorique (EUD, Dijon, 2003)
- Le sens du signifiant. Implications linguistiques et cognitives de la motivation (Honoré Champion, Paris, 2003)
- Essais de linguistique analogique (ABELL, Dijon, 2004)
- Cahiers de Linguistique Analogique. 1. Le mot comme signe et comme image. Lieux et enjeux de l'iconicité linguistique (ABELL, Dijon, 2003)
- La fonction expressive. Vol. 2 (with Laurent Gautier, PUFC, Besançon, 2010)

== See also ==
- Romanica Olomucensia
