= Elena Garro =

Mexican writer (1916-1998)

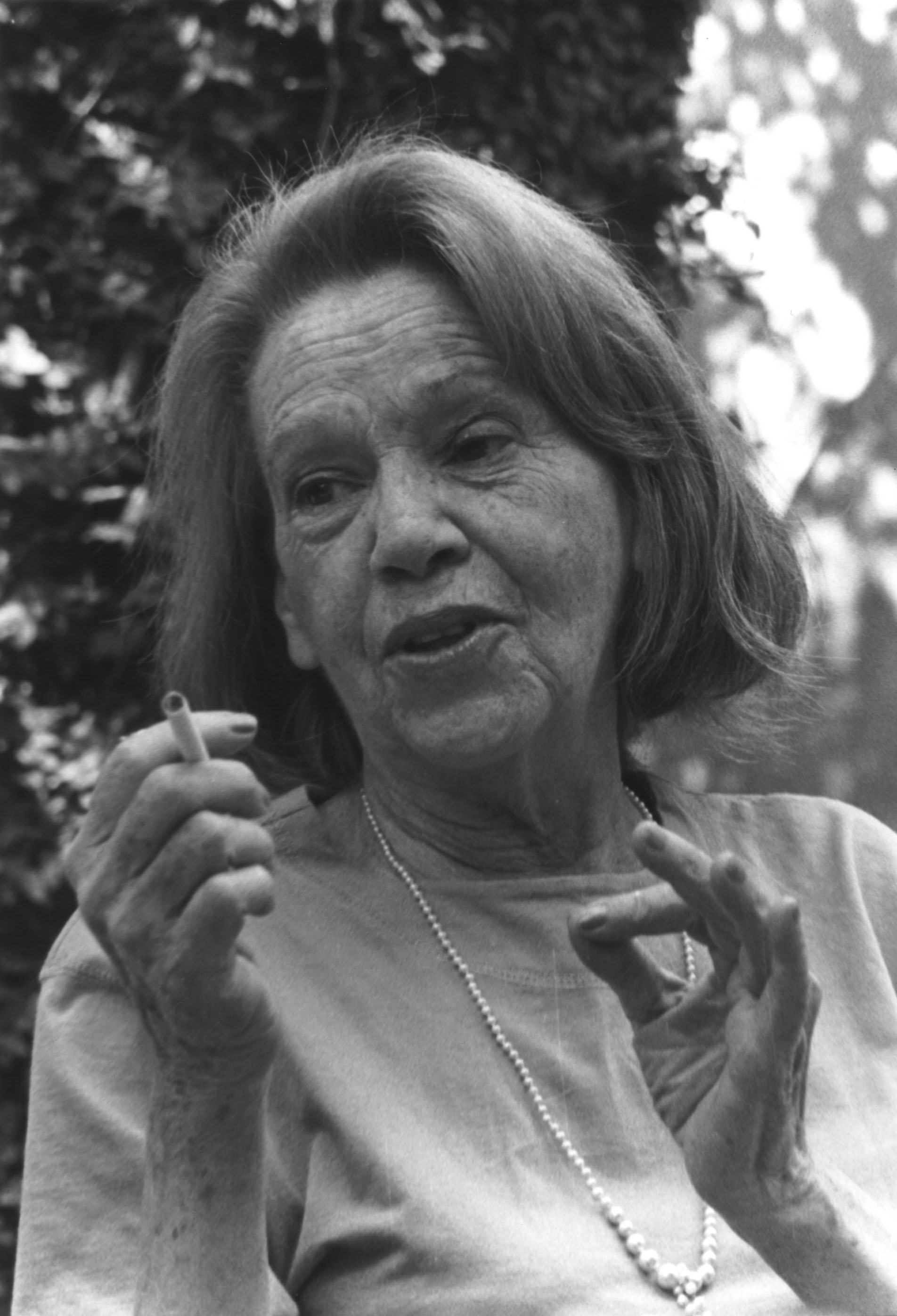
- Born: Elena Delfina Garro Navarro; December 11, 1916; Puebla, Puebla, Mexico
- Died: August 22, 1998 (aged 81); Cuernavaca, Morelos, México
- Occupations: Screenwriter; journalist; dramaturg; short story writer; novelist
- Movement: Magical Realism – Surrealism
- Spouse: Octavio Paz (1937–1959)

Elena Delfina Garro Navarro (Note: In this Mexican name, the surname is Garro and the second or maternal family name is Navarro.) (December 11, 1916 – August 22, 1998) was a Mexican author, playwright, screenwriter, journalist, short story writer, and novelist. She has been described as one of the pioneers and an early leading figure of the Magical Realism movement, though she rejected this affiliation. Alongside the works of Juan Rulfo, her first three works: Un hogar sólido (1958), Los recuerdos del porvenir (1963), and La semana de colores (1964), are considered to be among the earliest examples of Magical Realism in Latin American literature. Garro's writing, despite being mostly theatre and fictional prose, borrowed heavily from poetry and its literary elements. Author and biographer Patricia Rosas Lopategui has described Garro's style as "an attempt to rescue the use of everyday language in the form of poetry". Her style has also been compared to that of French writers like Georges Schéhadé, Jean Genet, as well as Romanian-French playwright Eugène Ionesco, due to the surreal nature of her stories. A close friend of Albert Camus, her works were also heavily influenced by his style and philosophy. She was the recipient of the Sor Juana Inés de la Cruz Prize in 1996.

Her tumultuous marriage with writer Octavio Paz, winner of the 1990 Nobel Prize in Literature, has been the subject of much scrutiny. Garro herself would describe the relationship as "filled with forbiddance, resentments, and rancour for not making each other happy". Despite the hostilities, they are considered among the most talented couple of writers to emerge during the Latin American literary boom of the twentieth century.

Garro is seen as one of the unsung figures of the boom; her legacy was influenced, in part, by her rejection of magical realism, as she considered the term "a cheap marketing label". Contemporary historians and literary biographers consider her work as seminal and view her as having been as important as figures like Juan Rulfo, Gabriel García Márquez, Julio Cortázar, and others.

== Biography ==
=== Early life and education ===
Elena Garro was born in the city of Puebla to José Antonio Garro Melendreras, a Spanish national, and Esperanza Navarro Benítez, a native from Mexico's northern state of Chihuahua. The third of five children, she spent her childhood in Mexico City but moved to Iguala, Guerrero, during the Cristero War. At the age of 12 she returned to Mexico City where she finished her studies at the Antiguo Colegio de San Ildefonso. Afterwards, she studied literature, choreography and theater in the National Autonomous University of Mexico in Mexico City, where she was an active member of Julio Bracho's theatre group.

During her time at the National Autonomous University of Mexico she met Octavio Paz, with whom she started a relationship. Paz and Garro married in 1937, against the wishes of her father. In 1939 their only child was born, Helena Paz Garro. For many years they had an "open relationship", with Paz having "many lovers" and her "some".

At the age of 21, during their first year of marriage, Garro and Paz traveled to Spain to attend the second edition of the International Congress of Writers in Defense of Culture. Among the attendees were other Latin American writers and poets, including Pablo Neruda and Alejo Carpentier, American poet Langston Hughes, and other Mexican cultural figures of the time like Carlos Pellicer and Silvestre Revueltas. Spain was in the midst of its Civil War and political fervors were in an all-time high. The congress was seen as an attempt from communists to spread their ideals and foster propaganda and that edition was its last. In 1992, Garro published Memorias de España 1937, which captured her experiences during the trip.

In the 1950s Garro wrote a number of plays for the theatre group Poesía en voz alta.^{,7}

In addition to her fiction writing, Garro sometimes wrote "for various Mexican journals and newspapers", including "opinion pieces, political notes and two feature series".^{,2}

In the 1970s Garro considered herself exiled from México, and lived in various locations outside of the city, including the USA and Spain, until 1993.^{,3}

=== Death ===
Garro died in 1998 from complications caused by emphysema, while living in Cuernavaca, Morelos.

=== Influences ===
Garro has cited the ancient Greeks, German Romantics, Heinrich von Kleist, Georg Büchner, Novalis, E.T.A Hoffmann, Lady Murasaki and Lupita Dueñas as some of her "favorite authors".

== Awards ==
- 1963 Xavier Villaurrutia Award, for Los recuerdos del porvenir (novel)
- 1996 Colima Fine Arts Award for Published Narrative Works for Busca mi esquela & Mi primer amor
- 1996 Sor Juana Inés de la Cruz Prize for Busca mi esquela (translated as Look for My Obituary)

== Works ==
- Los recuerdos del porvenir, Mexico City, Joaquín Mortiz, 1963, translated as Recollections of Things to Come by Ruth L. C. Simms.
- Andamos huyendo Lola, Mexico City, Joaquín Mortiz, 1980.
- Testimonios sobre Mariana, Mexico City, Grijalbo, 1981. ISBN 968-419-182-0
- Reencuentro de personajes, Mexico City, Grijalbo, 1982, ISBN 968-419-220-7
- La casa junto al río. Mexico City, Grijalbo, 1983, ISBN 968-419-217-7
- Y Matarazo no llamó..., Mexico City, Grijalbo, 1991. ISBN 970-05-0040-3
- Inés. Mexico City, Grijalbo, 1995, ISBN 970-05-0616-9
- Tiempo destino y opresión en la obra de Elena Garro [Time, Destiny and Oppression in the Work of Elena Garro], by Rhina Toruño Haensly (under Rhina Toruño). An authoritative book on the work of Elena Garro, a leading twentieth-century Mexican author. New York, NY: Mellen University Press, 1996. ISBN 0-7734-4258-8
- Busca mi esquela & Primer amor. 2. ed. Monterrey, Ediciones Castillo, 1998. (Colección Más allá; 14) ISBN 968-7415-36-3, translated as First Love & Look for My Obituary: Two Novellas, and winner of the Sor Juana Inés de la Cruz Prize
- Un traje rojo para un duelo. Monterrey, Ediciones Castillo, 1996, ISBN 968-7415-51-7
- Un corazón en un bote de basura, Mexico City, Joaquín Mortiz, 1996, ISBN 968-27-0672-6
- Mi hermanita Magdalena, Monterrey, Ediciones Castillo, 1998.
- Cita con la memoria. Elena Garro cuenta su vida a Rhina Toruño. Análisis de sus obras. [Encounter With Memory. Elena Garro Recounts her Story Life to Rhina Toruño], by Rhina Toruño Haensly (under Rhina Toruño). Buenos Aires: Prueba de Galera, 2004. ISBN 987-20648-6-5
