= El gallo de oro =

- Genre: Drama
- Written by: Lina Uribe; Darío Vanegas; Daniela Richer
- Directed by: Chava Cartas
- Starring: Lucero; José Ron; Plutarco Haza
- Composer: Jacobo Lieberman
- Country of origin: Mexico
- Original language: Spanish
- No. of seasons: 2
- No. of episodes: 20

Production
- Executive producers: Patricio Wills; Carlos Bardasano
- Producer: Jorge Sastoque Roa
- Editor: Víctor Manuel Ruiz Benavides
- Camera setup: Multi-camera
- Production companies: W Studios; TelevisaUnivision

Original release
- Network: Vix
- Release: 20 October 2023 – 12 January 2024

El gallo de oro is a Mexican streaming television series produced by W Studios for TelevisaUnivision. It is based on the 1980 novel of the same name, written by Juan Rulfo. It stars Lucero, José Ron and Plutarco Haza. The series premiered on Vix on 20 October 2023. The second season premiered on 12 January 2024.

== Premise ==
Set in Mexico in the 1940s, the series follows Dionisio Pinzón, a shy town crier whose passion is cockfighting, who falls in love with Bernarda, known as La Caponera, a sensual and impulsive woman who makes a living traveling through the towns of Mexico singing at fairs. The encounter between Dionisio and Bernarda changes their fortunes forever.

== Cast ==
=== Main ===
- Lucero as Bernarda Cutiño "La Caponera"
  - Amy Nicole as child Bernarda
- José Ron as Dionisio Pinzón
  - Mariano Ramos as child Dionisio
- Plutarco Haza as Lorenzo Benavides
- Alejandro Avila as Secundino
- Luis Felipe Tovar
- Adriana Williams as Justina
- Anilú Pardo as Eduviges
- Axel Alcántara
- Pablo Abitia
- Santiago Colores as Remigio
- María Aura as Lucha Padilla
- Alberto Estrella as Don Lucas
- Roberta de la Portilla

=== Recurring and guest stars ===
- Stephano Morales as Candelario
- Roberto Leyva as Agustín
- José Antonio Casillas as Pedro
- Juanjo Ramosanz as Jesús
- Alejandro Márquez as Torcuato
- Jesús Benavente as Samuel
- Luis Romano as Juvencio
- Salvador Amaya as Claudio
- Fernando Banda as Aurelio
- Mayra Torres as Tomasa
- Santiago Franklin as Miguel
- Chantall Frías as Engracia

== Episodes ==
=== Series overview ===
Series	Episodes	Originally released
1	10	20 October 2023
2	10	12 January 2024

=== Season 1 (2023) ===
No. overall	No. in season	Title	Original release date
1	1	"Bronca y mal portada"	20 October 2023
2	2	"La conquista"	20 October 2023
3	3	"Las fotos"	20 October 2023
4	4	"Los zapatos"	20 October 2023
5	5	"Los gallos"	20 October 2023
6	6	"La cruda"	20 October 2023
7	7	"El anillo"	20 October 2023
8	8	"Virginia"	20 October 2023
9	9	"La Daga"	20 October 2023
10	10	"El Rey de Oros"	20 October 2023

=== Season 2 (2024) ===
No. overall	No. in season	Title	Original release date
11	1	"Desaparecida"	12 January 2024
12	2	"El Féretro"	12 January 2024
13	3	"La Pinzona"	12 January 2024
14	4	"La botella"	12 January 2024
15	5	"La gira"	12 January 2024
16	6	"El castigo divino"	12 January 2024
17	7	"Encierro"	12 January 2024
18	8	"Familia"	12 January 2024
19	9	"La voz"	12 January 2024
20	10	"Así es la vida"	12 January 2024

== Production ==
On 14 February 2023, it was announced that the series had begun production, with Lucero, José Ron and Plutarco Haza being confirmed in the lead roles. Filming ended in June 2023.

== Release ==
The series premiered on Vix on 20 October 2023. The second season premiered on 12 January 2024. The series made its broadcast television premiere on Univision on 8 May 2024.

== Awards and nominations ==
Year	Award	Category	Nominated	Result	Ref
2024	India Catalina Awards	Best Ibero-American Talent	Lucero	Nominated	
2024	Produ Awards	Best Adapted Series	El gallo de oro	Nominated	
2024	Produ Awards	Best Lead Actor - Drama Series	José Ron	Nominated	

== Music ==
El Gallo de Oro (Las Canciones de la Serie)

Soundtrack album
- Released: 10 November 2023
- Length: 53:08
- Label: Fonarte Latino

El Gallo de Oro (Las Canciones de la Serie) is the soundtrack to the series. It was released by Fonarte Latino on 10 November 2023.

No.	Title	Artist(s)	Length
1.	"Jardinera (Caponera)"	Lucero	2:45
2.	"El Gallo de Oro"	Lucero	2:38
3.	"Vámonos"	Lucero	3:06
4.	"Paloma Querida"	Lucero	2:44
5.	"No Volveré"	Lucero	2:45
6.	"El Último Trago"	Lucero	2:23
7.	"El Gavilancillo"	Lucero	2:09
8.	"La Cigarra"	Lucero	2:54
9.	"Yo Soy Feliz - Versión Solista"	Lucero	2:46
10.	"Hay Unos Ojos - Versión Solista"	Lucero	2:48
11.	"El Toro Relajo"	Lucero	2:34
12.	"Amanecí en Tus Brazos"	Lucero	2:48
13.	"Mi Último Cartucho"	Lucero	1:58
14.	"Si Nos Dejan"	Lucero	2:20
15.	"Yo Soy Feliz - Versión Dueto"	Lucero and María Aura	2:45
16.	"Cuando Vivas Conmigo"	Plutarco Haza	2:13
17.	"La Tequilera"	María Aura	3:07
18.	"Hay Unos Ojos - Versión Dueto"	Lucero and Axel Alcántara	2:47
19.	"Jardinera (Caponera) - Versión Dueto"	Lucero and Berenice	2:45
20.	"Mi Último Cartucho - A Capella"	Lucero	2:33
Total length:			53:08
