= Goldener Hahn =

German ceremonial wine goblet

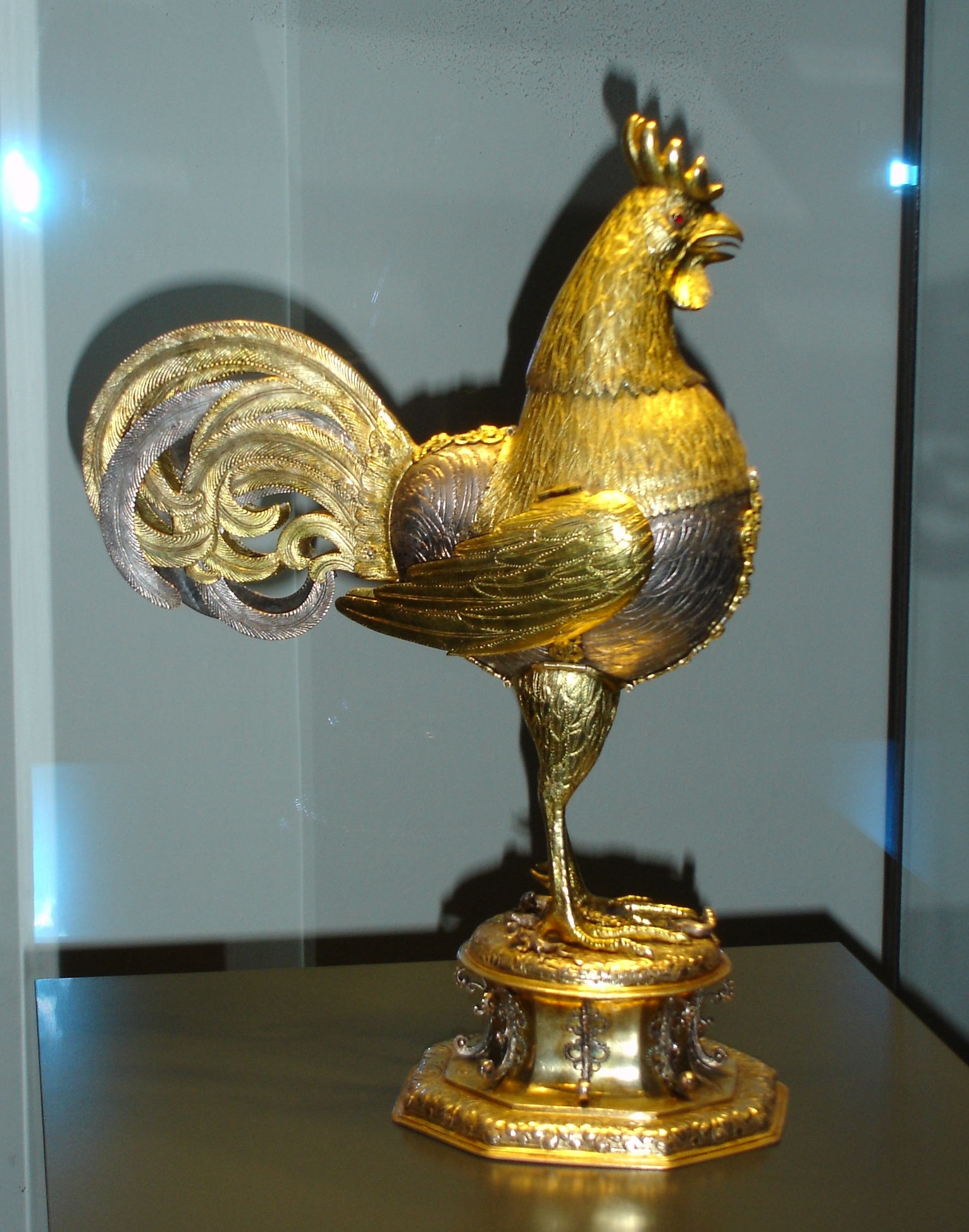
The Goldener Hahn on display in Münster

The Goldener Hahn ("Golden Hen"), also known as the Golden Cockerel, is a ceremonial wine cup on display in the Historical City Hall of Münster. The cup is offered as a welcome cup to important guests of the city, and takes its shape from a legend in the history of Münster, Germany.

== Design ==
The cup is a silver-gilt vessel shaped in the form of a cockerel. The head lifts off to reveal the space to fill with drink. The goblet itself was created in the 17th century in Nuremberg, Germany, and given as a gift to Münster. The goblet, which holds one bottle of wine, is offered to important guests of the city. The goblet is currently on display in the Historical City Hall of Münster.

== Legend ==
According to Münsterian legend, a cockerel saved the city when a rooster flew to a high point in the city, an act which caused a besieging army (which had been attempting to starve the city into submission) to lose hope that the city could be easily taken. As such, cockerels became strongly associated with the history of the city.
