= Rhina Toruño Haensly =

Rhina Toruño Haensly (1948–2022) was a Salvadoran scholar and teacher. She earned two doctorates: one in philosophy and a second in Latin American literature. She began her career as a professor of philosophy in El Salvador. In 1981, shortly after the onset of the Salvadoran Civil War, she immigrated to the United States and began a new career in academics in the field of Spanish language and Latin American literature. She published several books, wrote many scholarly papers, and delivered numerous presentations about 20th century Latin American writers. Her best-known scholarly work is about Elena Garro. In 1995, Toruño Haensly was inducted into the Academia Salvadoreña de la Lengua (Salvadoran Academy of Language), which is a branch of the Royal Academy of Spanish in Spain. She earned numerous other honors for her teaching and scholarship over her life.

== Education and early scholarship in philosophy ==
Rhina Toruño Haensly was born in San Salvador, the capital city of El Salvador in 1940 and grew up there with her five brothers and sisters. Her parents were Juan Felipe Toruño and Juana Contreras de Toruño. Her father was an author, poet, and journalist, first in Nicaragua and later in El Salvador.

Toruño Haensly attended high school at Colegio Santa Inés from which she received her teaching certification. She taught at Colegio Sagrado Corazón, a private Catholic elementary school for three years, and then at Colegio La Asunción, a private secondary school.

Toruño Haensly began her scholarly career in philosophy by earning a Bachelors of Art in Philosophy in 1971 from the University of El Salvador, or Universidad de El Salvador, the most prominent university in El Salvador. She pursued her graduate studies at the Catholic University of Louvain, or Katholieke Universiteit Leuven, a major research university in the city of Leuven, Belgium. She earned a Masters of Art in Philosophy in 1973 and a Ph.D. in French Contemporary Philosophy in 1978. Her dissertation was, “Emmanuel Mounier's Idea of Society.” Toruño Haensly received the Emmanuel Mounier International Prize, which was awarded to support doctoral research in philosophy. In addition, her studies were supported by a scholarship for postgraduate studies awarded jointly by University of El Salvador and the Catholic University of Louvain. During her studies in Europe, she became fluent in French.

Toruño Haensly returned to El Salvador in 1976 (while also working to complete her dissertation) to teach philosophy at the University of El Salvador. Over the period 1975 through 1978, she published five scholarly papers in philosophy. (See the subsection, "Scholarly papers in philosophy," in the Publications section below.) She taught courses in modern philosophy, existentialism, contemporary French philosophy, ethics, and social and political philosophy. Her academic accomplishments led to promotion to the rank of Professor at the University of El Salvador.

== Transition to a career in Latin American literature ==
The Salvadoran Civil War (1979 through 1992) disrupted Toruño Haensly's academic career in El Salvador. She was a member of the Salvadoran University Catholic Action (ACUS), a social Christian organization. While the majority of members of ACUS, including Toruño Haensly, were not sympathizers of the leftist guerilla organizations that formed the Farabundo Martí National Liberation Front (FMLN), some members were. Hence, members of ACUS became targets of the state security forces and paramilitary death squads. When Toruño Haensly learned that she was on a death list, she decided to leave El Salvador for the safety of herself and her two sons.

Toruño Haensly was awarded an international fellowship from the Fédération Internationale des Femmes Diplomées des Universités (International Association of University Women) based in Geneva, Switzerland. This fellowship was awarded for post-doctoral multidisciplinary research combining Latin American literature and philosophy. The one year fellowship provided the financial support for scholarly work as a Visiting Scholar at Stanford University, a private research university near Palo Alto, California, where Toruño Haensly moved in fall 1981. Toruño Haensly and her sons learned English from scratch on moving to the U.S. Thus, she added fluency in a third language to her linguistic skills.

Toruño Haensly's scholarly interest in Latin American literature began earlier while she was studying philosophy at the Catholic University of Louvain. She commuted from Louvain to Paris to take graduate classes at the University of Paris-Sorbonne in France. She earned a Master of Arts in Latin American literature in 1976.

When her fellowship at Stanford University ended, Toruño Haensly began graduate work in Latin American literature at the University of California-Irvine, where she received the Regents’ Fellowship for Outstanding Doctoral Student and also taught Spanish as a teaching assistant from 1982 through 1983. Toruño Haensly's future second husband, Héctor-Neri Castañeda, whom she met while he was a fellow at the Center for Advanced Study in the Behavioral Sciences at Stanford University, persuaded her to continue her graduate work at Indiana University in Bloomington, Indiana. She moved there with her two sons in 1983. While working on a doctorate in Latin American literature, she taught courses in Spanish and Latin American literature at Indiana University, first as an Associate Instructor from 1983 through 1989 and then as a Lecturer from 1990 through 1993. In fall 1989, she was invited to deliver seminars on Latin American literature and culture at the Collegium Pro America Latina at the Catholic University of Louvain in Belgium.

In 1987, Toruño Haensly married Héctor-Neri Castañeda, who became her second husband. She traveled with Héctor when he delivered lectures in philosophy in Europe. When Héctor was diagnosed with brain cancer in 1990, Toruño Haensly suspended her graduate studies to care for him. She took Héctor to his home country of Guatemala a few weeks before his death to receive his country's highest award, the Order of the Quetzal, in honor of his scholarly accomplishments in philosophy. Héctor died on September 7, 1991, in Bloomington, Indiana. While Héctor still could speak, he urged Toruño Haensly to become a citizen of the United States. She became a naturalized citizen of the U.S. shortly before Héctor died.

In 1994, Toruño Haensly earned her Ph.D. in Latin American Literature from Indiana University Bloomington. Toruño Haensly's dissertation was Tiempo, destino y opresión en la obra de Elena Garro (Time, Destiny and Oppression in the work of Elena Garro). Toruño Haensly did groundbreaking work on the writings of Elena Garro, who is now recognized as one of the leading 20th century women writers in Mexico. This recognition is in part due to Toruño Haensly's books and other scholarly papers that she wrote about Elena Garro. Toruño Haensly's work was based on a series of interviews that she conducted with Elena Garro in Mexico. Toruño Haensly's dissertation was published as a book in 1996 with an updated edition in 1998.

In 1995, Toruño Haensly was inducted into the Academia Salvadoreña de la Lengua (Salvadoran Academy of Language), which is a branch of the Royal Academy of Spanish in Spain. She was the first woman to receive this honor.

== Scholar and teacher of Latin American literature ==
After teaching for a year at Florida State University in Tallahassee, Florida, in 1995 Toruño Haensly joined the faculty of the University of Texas of the Permian Basin (UTPB) in Odessa, Texas, as an assistant professor of Spanish. Her experience and outstanding scholarly work led to early promotions, first to associate professor after two years and then to the rank of Professor in 2001. She also became a Fellow in the Kathlyn Cosper Dunagan Professorship in Humanities in 2000 and held this fellowship until she retired in August 2013.

Toruño Haensly was an accomplished scholar. Highlights of her career while at UTPB include a stint as a Visiting Scholar at the Institute for Latin American Studies at Freie Universität Berlin, Germany, in summer 2002, as well as active participation in the Academia Norteamérica de la Lengua Española (ANLE), the Latin American Studies Association (LASA), and the Modern Language Association (MLA). Toruño Haensly was recognized early at UTPB for her scholarly work with her induction into the La Mancha Society at UTPB in 2002.

Toruño Haensly's other scholarly work about the writings of the Mexican author, Elena Garro, includes three editions of Cita con la memoria; Elena Garro cuenta su vida a Rhina Toruño [Encounter With Memory; Elena Garro Recounts her Life to Rhina Toruño]. Toruño Haensly published two books about the writings of her father, who was a prominent poet, author, and journalist in Central America: Juan Felipe Toruño in Two Worlds; Critical Analysis of his Works (2006) and a critical edition of the novel El Silencio, by Juan Felipe Toruño, that Toruño Haensly co-edited with Dr. Ardis Nelson (2010). Toruño Haensly strived to promote the writings of other Latin American and Mexican-American authors in her books, A viva voz: Las escritoras y escritores latinos hablan de sus vidas y obras (In Their Own Voices: Latino Writers Talk About Their Lives and Works, published in 2009);, Cruzando culturas: Autores hispanos en los Estados Unidos y sus desafíos superados (Crossing Cultures; Hispanic Authors in the United States and the Challenges They Overcame, published in 2011); and Voces de Escritores Latinoamericanos. Análisis critico de sus obras (Voices of Latin American Writers; Critical Analysis of Their Works, published in 2015).

Toruño Haensly was a prolific scholar. In addition to the books that she wrote, Toruño Haensly published 34 scholarly papers. (See the subsection, “Scholarly papers in Latin American literature,” in the Publications section below.) She also wrote nine chapters in anthologies on Latin American literature. (See the subsection, "Chapters contributed to anthologies and encyclopedias about Latin American literature," in the Publications section below.) She gave numerous presentations at academic conferences in the U.S., Mexico, Argentina, France, Costa Rica, Columbia, Ecuador, Panama, Guatemala, and El Salvador. Her presentations included seven keynote speeches and over 20 invited lectures. During her career, Toruño Haensly also was active in organizing conference programs and chairing panel presentations.

Toruño Haensly's enthusiasm for scholarship was matched by her passion for teaching. Beginning with her teaching at Sagrado Corazon, an elementary school in El Salvador to her teaching at UTPB, she delighted in sharing her knowledge and motivating her students to learn. At UTPB, she developed many new undergraduate and graduate courses in Spanish and created a robust Masters of Arts program in Spanish in 2004 with the help of her colleagues. Among the courses that she developed and taught were courses on contemporary Mexican literature, 20th-century Spanish American prose, Central American literature, and Spanish for health care workers. She was especially proud of her course in Hispanic children's literature that she developed for graduate students who were planning to teach at primary schools. Toruño Haensly served as Graduate Head for Spanish from 2004 through her retirement in 2013. Toruño Haensly's teaching has been recognized by nomination many times for the President's or Chancellor's Award for Outstanding Teacher at UTPB. She has been listed eight times in Who's Who Among America's Teachers. In 2015, her recognition culminated with the award by the League of United Latin American Citizens (LULAC) for Best Hispanic Educator in Odessa.

Toruño Haensly strived to share her love of literature with the community. She organized many guest speaker presentations in Odessa, Texas. One of her most outstanding contributions was to found the Odessa-Midland Spanish Literary Club shortly after arriving in Odessa. She served as its president until 2015, and the club continues to host monthly book presentations.

Toruño Haensly's community service extended beyond literature. For example, she spearheaded a clothing drive to help victims of the January 2001 El Salvador earthquake, which was the worst earthquake in the modern history of El Salvador. In 2004, she received the Certificate of Appreciation for Outstanding Volunteerism from the Midland Independent School District. In 2005, Toruño Haensly and her Spanish Literature Club were active in fund raising with the Red Cross for victims of Hurricane Katrina, the Category 5 hurricane that devastated New Orleans.

In 2013, Toruño Haensly was recognized in El Salvador for her accomplishments. Her biography was included in Las 100 historias que siempre quise saber; Personas exitosas de El Salvador (The 100 Stories That I Always Wanted to Know; Successful Persons of El Salvador), and she was honored in the related ceremony in July 2013 in the capital city of San Salvador. In addition, Toruño Haensly is listed in Marquis Who's Who in America, 21st Century Edition; The Chronicle of Human Achievement, 2001-2008; Who's Who in the World (2004 through 2009); and the International Who's Who of Professional & Business Women, 7th Ed. (2000).

While at UTPB, Toruño Haensly met Paul Haensly, her third husband, who was teaching finance at the university. In June 2005, they were married at St. Elizabeth Ann Seton Catholic Church in Odessa, Texas, where she served as a Eucharistic Minister.

Toruño Haensly was diagnosed with a rare motor neuron disease called progressive apraxia of speech in 2014. Even though she began losing her ability to speak (and, later on, the ability to write or type), she continued her scholarly work as long as possible. She wrote two more scholarly papers and delivered two more presentations at conferences (“Elena Garro fue pionera del realismo mágico, activista política y defensora de los campesinos [Elena Garro was a pioneer in magical realism, political activist, and defender of the peasants],” at the First Symposium on Garro, sponsored by Universidad Autónoma de la Ciudad de México, 24-26 Sept. 2014; and “Rubén Darío: Luminosidad de nuestra lengua y critico del intervencionismo americano en Nicaragua [Rubén Darío: luminary of our language and critic of American intervention in Nicaragua],” presented at the International Symposium on Rubén Darío at the Centennial of His Death sponsored by Movimiento Mundial Dariano in Miami, Florida, 6-13 Feb. 2016). Toruño Haensly also published the third edition of her book, Cita con la memoria. Elena Garro cuenta su vida a Rhina Toruño [Encounter With Memory; Elena Garro Recounts her Story Life to Rhina Toruño] in 2014 and her final book, Voces de Escritores Latinoamericanos. Análisis critico de sus obras [Voices of Latin American Writers; Critical Analysis of Their Works], an anthology in which she celebrated the contributions of several 20th-century Latin American authors.

Toruño Haensly died from complications due to her motor neuron disease in November 2022.

== Publications ==
Toruño Haensly also published as Rhina Toruño.

=== Books ===
- Tiempo destino y opresión en la obra de Elena Garro [Time, Destiny and Oppression in the Work of Elena Garro]. An authoritative book on the work of Elena Garro, a leading twentieth-century Mexican author. New York, NY: Mellen University Press, 1996. ISBN 0-7734-4258-8.
  - 2nd edition. This edition adds new articles not in first edition and in-depth interviews conducted with Garro during the last years of Garro's life. San Salvador: Universidad Tecnológica de El Salvador, 1998. ISBN 99923-21-00-8.
- Cita con la memoria. Elena Garro cuenta su vida a Rhina Toruño. Análisis de sus obras. [Encounter With Memory. Elena Garro Recounts her Story Life to Rhina Toruño]. Buenos Aires, Argentina: Prueba de Galera, 2004. ISBN 987-20648-6-5.
  - 2nd edition. Encounter with Memory; Elena Garro Tells Her Life to Rhina Toruño. (Translated from Spanish.) Bloomington, IN: Palibrio, 2011. ISBN 978-1-4633-0456-0.
  - 3rd edition. Mexico City: Ediciones EON, 2014. ISBN 978-607-8289-68-4.
- Juan Felipe Toruño en dos mundos. Análisis crítico de sus obras [Juan Felipe Toruño in Two Worlds; Critical Analysis of his Works]. Editors: Rhina Toruño Haensly and Ardis L. Nelson. Boston, MA: CBH Books, Cambridge Brick House, Inc., 2006.. ISBN 1-59835-011-0.
- A viva voz: Las escritoras y escritores latinos hablan de sus vidas y obras. Antologia critica de sus textos narrativos, poeticos y dramaticos [In Their Own Voices: Latino Writers Talk About Their Lives and Works; Critical Analysis of Their Novels, Poetry, and Drama]. New York, NY: Linus Publications, 2009. ISBN 1-60797-083-X.
- El silencio, by Juan Felipe Toruno. Critical edition. Editors: Rhina Toruño Haensly and Ardis L. Nelson. San Salvador, El Salvador: Editorial Delgado; Universidad Dr. José Matías Delgado, 2010. ISBN 978-99923-934-0-6.
- Cruzando culturas: Autores hispanos en los Estados Unidos y sus desafíos superados [Crossing Cultures; Hispanic Authors in the United States and the Challenges They Overcame]. Editor: Rhina Toruño Haensly. Bilingual book in Spanish and English. New York, NY: Peter Lang; Currents in Romance Languages and Literature, 2011. ISBN 978-1-4331-1253-9
- Voces de Escritores Latinoamericanos. Análisis critico de sus obras [Voices of Latin American Writers; Critical Analysis of Their Works]. Mexico City: Ediciones EON, 2015. ISBN 978-607-9426-16-3.

=== Scholarly papers in philosophy ===
1. “Résonances de la philosophie d'Emmanuel Mounier dans la jeunesse universitaire Latino-Américaine [The Huge Impact of Emmanuel Mounier's Philosophy on the New Generation of Latin-American Universities].” Bulletin des Amis d'Emmanuel Mounier. Paris, France: 44–45. 1975. 52–53.
2. “Idea de la sociedad en Emmanuel Mounier [The Idea of Society in Emmanuel Mounier].” Revue Philosophique de Louvain. Belgium: 74. Nov. 1976. 691–93.
3. “Antropología actual: El Ser-En-Sí en El Ser y la Nada, Jean-Paul Sartre [Up-to-Date Anthropology: El Ser-En-Sí in Being and Nothingness by Jean-Paul Sartre].” Publicaciones de la Facultad de Jurisprudencia. 9 Jan. 1978. 1–9.
4. “Idea de la sociedad en Emmanuel Mounier [The Idea of Society in Emmanuel Mounier].” Bulletin des Amis d'Emmanuel Mounier. Published in Paris, France: 48. 1978. 29–30.
5. “La idea de sociedad en el personalismo comunitario de Emmanuel Mounier [The Idea of Society in Emmanuel Mounier's Personal Christian Communism].” Conflicto. San Salvador, El Salvador: National University Press. 1, no. 1 Jan. 1978. 65–90.

=== Chapters contributed to anthologies and encyclopedias about Latin American literature ===
1. Toruño, Rhina, and Carlos Amaya. “La cenicienta en una fiesta de medianoche en el país de la sonrisa en Después de medianoche [Cinderella at the Midnight Ball in the Country of the Smile in After Midnight].” Antología crítica del teatro breve hispanoaméricano [Critical Anthology of Spanish American Short Drama]. Eds. María Mercedes Jaramillo and Mario Yepes Londoño. Antioquia, Colombia: Universidad de Antioquia, 1997. 80–84.
2. “Elena Garro escribió su ‘porvenir’ en Los recuerdos del porvenir [Elena Garro Wrote Her ‘Future’ in the Novel Recollections of Things to Come].” Baúl de recuerdos: Homenaje a Elena Garro [Trunk of Memoirs: Tribute to Elena Garro]. Ed. Mara García and Robert K. Anderson. Tlaxcala, Mexico: The University Press of Tlaxcala, 1999. 23-34.
3. “Elena Garro.” Notable Twentieth-Century Latin American Women: A Biographical Dictionary. Eds. Cynthia Margarita Tompkins and David William Foster. Westport, CT: Greenwood Press, 2001. 106–10.
4. Dossier: “Juan Felipe Toruño, poeta, novelista nicaragüense.” Edited and wrote introduction with Ardis L. Nelson. Revista Iberoamericana (Organo del Instituto Internacional de Literatura Iberoamericana, University of Pittsburgh) LXXII, nos. 215–216. April-Sept. 2006. 303–375.
5. “Juan Felipe Toruño.” Dictionary of Salvadoran Writers. San Salvador: Secretary of Culture of El Salvador, 2007. Seven-page biographical entry about Juan Felipe Toruño.
6. “La catarsis Aristotélica y la política dramatúrgica de Augusto Boal [Aristotle's Dramatic Catharsis and Its Political Criticism by Augusto Boal]”. In: El Cuerpo, el sonido y la imagen. Helena Beristáin-Gerardo Ramírez Vidal, ed. Mexico City: Universidad Nacional Autónoma de México. Instituto de Investigaciones Filológicas. 2008. 379–396.
7. “Entrevista a Elena Garro [Interview with Elena Garro]”, by Patricia Rosas Lopategui and Rhina Toruño. In: Elena Garro: un recuerdo sólido [Elena Garro: A Sound Memory]. Ed. Mara L. García. Veracruz, México: Universidad Veracruzana, 2009. 25–43.
8. World Literature in Spanish: An Encyclopedia. Edited by Drs. Maureen Ihrie & Salvador Oropesa. Westport, CT: Greenwood Press, October 2011. ABC-CLIO. Hardcover ISBN 978-0-313-33770-3, 978-0-313-08083-8. Contributed the following five chapters: Manlio Argueta; David Escobar Galindo; Juan Felipe Toruño; La Generación comprometida de El Salvador [The Salvadoran Committed Generation]; El Salvador: History, Culture and Literatura
9. “Hijo legítimo de la generación comprometida De la hamaca al trono y al mas alla,” by Rhina Toruño y James Knight. In: Lecturas críticas de la obra de Manlio Argueta. Antología de Ensayos [Readings Critiquing the Work of Manlio Argueta; Anthology of Essays]. Eds. Linda J. Craft, Astvaldur Astvaldsson, and Ana Patricia Rodriguez. Press: Universidad Tecnológica de El Salvador, 2013. 65–84.
10. “Poema autobiográfico [Autobiographical Poem]”. In: Antología Poética: Raices Unidas, Houston, TX: Millennium Press, 2013. ISB978-1-304-34974-3.
11. “‘Ego’ poema de Juan Felipe Toruño, de estímulo a la juventud actual [‘Ego’: poem by Juan Felipe Toruño of encouragement to current youth].” In: Voces del Exilio; Antología de escritores nicaragüenses, ed. José Antonio Luna. Tampa, FL: Ediciones Cougar Connections Art, Jan. 2016. 97-102.

=== Scholarly papers in Latin American literature ===
1. “El protagonista verdadero de El Siglo de las luces de Alejo Carpentier [The True Main Character in The Century of Light by Alejo Carpentier].” Chiricú. Chicano-Riqueño Studies. Bloomington, Indiana: Indiana University. 4, no. 1. 1985. 19–39.
2. “A Strong Feminist Voice: Matilde Elena López.” Chiricú. Chicano-Riqueño Studies. Bloomington, Indiana: Indiana University. 5, no. 1. 1987. 22–23.
3. “En busca del eje central de la obra El siglo de las luces de Alejo Carpentier [In Search of the Central Idea in the Work, The Century of Light, by Alejo Carpentier].” Taller de Letras. San Salvador, El Salvador: Departamento de Letras, Universidad Centro Americana José Simeón Cañas. 116. 1987. 19–34.
4. Rosas Lopategui, Patricia, and Rhina Toruño. “Entrevista: Elena Garro [Interview with Elena Garro].” Hispamérica: Revista de Literatura. 20, no. 60 Dec. 1991. 55–71.
5. “Protesta contra la opresión: categorías medulares en la obra narrativa y dramática de Elena Garro [Protest against oppression: Fundamental Categories in the Narrative and Dramatic Work of Elena Garro].” Deslinde: Revista de la Facultad de Filosofía y Letras de la UANL. Journal of the School of Philosophy and Literatura. Nuevo León, México: University of Nuevo León. 9, no. 35–36. 1992. 93–95.
6. “Distintos referentes y afines significantes en La muerte de Artemio Cruz y El siglo de las luces [Different References and Related Significance in The Death of Artemio Cruz and The Century of Light].” ARS . El Salvador: Published by Ministry of Education. 3. 1993. 29–33.
7. “Y Matarazo no llamó…: Novela política y la última escrita por Elena Garro [And Matarazo Never Called Back…: Political Novel and the Most Recent Work by Elena Garro].” Letras informa. Published by the Dept. of Literature, School of Humanities. Ciudad de Guatemala, Guatemala: University of San Carlos. 2, no. 6. Sept.–Dec. 1994. 9–14.
8. “Del realismo mágico de Los recuerdos del porvenir al realismo social de Y Matarazo no llamó…[From the Magical Realism of Recollection of Things to Come to the Social Realism of And Matarazo Never Called Back…]” Deslinde: Revista de la Facultad de Filosofía y Letras de la UANL. Journal of the School of Philosophy and Literature. Nuevo León, México: University of Nuevo León.12, no. 46–47. Jan.–June 1995. 36–39.
9. “Juan Felipe Toruño: Vida y poesía” [“Juan Felipe Toruño:Life and Poetry].” Voces: Arte, Literatura, Actualidad Cultural. Editor of Journal Voces: Armando Molina. San Francisco, California: Ed. Solaris Vol. 1. 1999: 26–29. This article was first published in an online edition. Virtual Journal Voces Editor: Armando Molina Vol. 4 Oct. 1998. 1–3. http://members.oal.com/SFVoces/rhina.html
10. “Elena Garro, una de las tres grandes escritoras que México ha producido en todos los tiempos, ha muerto: Breve auobiografía, entrevistas con Garro aunadas a comentarios sobre sus obras [One of the Three Greatest Women Writers of All Times That Mexico Has Produced, Has Passed Away: A Brief Autobiography, Interviews With Garro Along With Commentaries About Her Works].” Deslinde: Revista de la Facultad de Filosofía y Letras de la UANL . Journal of the School of Philosophy and Literature. Nuevo León, México: University of Nuevo León. 15, no. 59–62. Jan.–Dec. 1998. 59–64.
11. “Elena Garro una de las tres más grandes escritoras de México, ha muerto (1916-1998).” Alba de Amèrica: Revista Literaria. Organo del Instituto Literario y Cultural Hispànico. Westminster, CA: 18, no. 33-34/ July 1999. 39–41.
12. “Elena Garro, una de las tres más grandes escritoras de México, ha muerto [Elena Garro, One of the Three Most Important Women Writers in Mexico, Has Passed Away] (1916-1998).” Revista Iberoamericana. Organo del Instituto Internacional de Literatura Iberoamericana. Pittsburgh, PA: University of Pittsburgh. 65, no. 186. Jan.–Mar. 1999. 185–87.
13. “Las escritoras latinas en los Estados Unidos de cara al siglo XXI [Hispanic American Women Writers in the United States Facing the Twenty-first Century].” Ventana Abierta: Revista Latina de Literatura, Arte y Cultura. Centro de Estudios Chicanos. Santa Barbara, California: University of California. 2, no. 8. Spring 2000. 26–30.
14. “Análisis del desarrollo de un ente femenino, como sujeto existencial en Miralina, de Marcela del Río [Analysis of the Development of the Femine Being as an Existencial Subject in the Miralina by Marcela del Río].” The Role of the World Wide Web In the Analysis of Verbal and Visual Images in the Text and Paintings of Marcela del Río. 25 Apr. 2000. URL: http://128.226.37.29/delrio/sec.htm
15. “Las fronteras de los Estados Unidos convertidas en puerta de salvación para la inmigración salvadoreña [The United States Border Has Been Converted Into a Door of Salvation for Salvadoran Immigrants].” Ventana Abierta: Revista Latina de Literatura, Arte y Cultura. Centro de Estudios Chicanos. Santa Barbara, California: University of California. 2, no. 10. Spring 2001. 21–23.
16. “Elena Garro. En su obra de ficción hay crítica a la política Mexicana [Elena Garro. Her Fictional Work Criticizes Mexican Politics].” Prueba de Galera, Revista Literaria. Buenos Aires, Argentina: 8, no. 62 Jan. –Mar. 2003: 29–31.
17. “Entrevista a la Dra. Matilde Elena López: Un extraordinaria escritora Salvadoreña [Interview with Dr. Matilde Elena Lopez: An Extraordinary Salvadoran Writer].” elfaro.net (Internet published in El Salvador) 16 June 2003. URL: http://www.elfaro.net/secciones.el_agora/20030616/elagora2_20030616.asp
18. “Entre la ficción y la realidad en algunos testimonios sobre la Guerra Civil Salvadoreña [Between Fiction and Reality in Some Testimonies About the Salvadoran Civil War].” Fragmentos de Cultura. Goiás, Brasil: Universidades Católica de Goiás. 13 July 2003. 81–95.
19. “David Hernandez, ‘le bon sauvage’ salvadoreño. Una verdad contada como si fuera mentira [David Hernandez, the Salvadoran ‘le bon sauvage.’ A Truth Recounted As If It Were a Lie].” elfaro.net (Internet published in El Salvador) 18–24 August 2003: 1-4.
20. “Distintos referentes y temáticas semejantes en las líricas de Rubén Darío y de Joao de Cruz e Sousa [Different References and Similar Themes in the Lyric Poetry of Rubén Darío and of Joáo de Cruz e Sousa].” El Pez y la Serpiente 51 Revista Centroamericana de cultura. 51, Managua, Nicaragua: Ed. Centroamericana Oct–Dec. 2003. 45–60.
21. “A la juventud actual: ‘Ego’ de Juan Felipe Toruño [To Contemporary Youth: ‘Ego’ by Juan Felipe Toruño].” Ventana Abierta: Revista Latina de Literatura, Arte y Cultura Centro de Estudios Chicanos. Santa Barbara: California: University of California. 5, no. 9. Fall 2005. 24-27.
22. “Juan Felipe Toruño, Poeta, Novelista Nicaragüense [Juan Felipe Toruño, Poet, Nicaraguan Novelist].” Dossier co-edited by Rhina Toruño Haensly & Ardis Nelson. Revista Iberoamericana. Órgano del Instituto Internacional de Literatura Iberoamericana. Pittsburgh PA: University of Pittsburgh. LXXII, nos. 215–216. Apr.-Sept. 2006. 303–349.
23. “La historiografía literaria salvadoreña [Salvadoran Literary Historiography].” Revista Iberoamericana. Organo del Instituto Internacional de Literatura Iberoamericana. Pittsburgh PA: University of Pittsburgh. LXXII, nos. 215–216. Apr.-Sept. 2006. 369–375.
24. “La novela El Silencio de Juan Felipe Toruño, deja al descubierto las diferentes capas de ‘silencio’ de la sociedad Nicaragüense, en la primera mitad del siglo XX.” [The novel El Silencio by Juan Felipe Toruño Shows the Different Layers of ‘Silence’ in Nicaraguan Society During the First Half of the XX Century]. Ciudad de Guatemala, Guatemala: Centro Internacional de Literatura Centroamericana (CILCA): Ed. Oscar de Leon Palacios. Vol. 5. 2007. 139–150.
25. “La Literatura recrea en forma de novela la guerra civil Salvadoreña y el asesinato de Monseñor Oscar Arnulfo Romero [The Literature Recreates the Salvadoran Civil War and the Assassination of the Msgr. Oscar Arnulfo Romero in the form of a Novel].” Ciudad de Guatemala, Guatemala: Literatura Centroamericana Nuevos Estudios Centro Internacional de Literatura Centroamericana (CILCA): Ed. Oscar de Leon Palacios. Vol. 5. 2007. 129–137.
26. “La libertad y el destino, antípodas centrales en la vida de los personajes de El silencio de Juan Felipe Toruño [Liberty and Destiny, Paradoxes in the Life of the Characters in The Silence by Juan Felipe Toruño].” Cultura, Revista del Consejo Nacional para la Cultura y el Arte [The National Salvadoran Journal of Literature, Culture and Arts]. San Salvador, El Salvador: Direcciones de Publicaciones e impresos de Concultura. No 95. Jan.-April 2007. 85–99.
27. “En Socrates y los gatos el codigo historico es la Masacre de Tlatelolco [In Socrates y los gatos the Historic Code is the Massacre of Tlateloco].” Analecta Literatia (Online journal published in Argentina) 25 September 2008. (The Massacre of Tlateloco took place in Mexico City on Oct 2, 1968.)
28. “Análisis hermeneútico del poema ‘Mensaje a los hombres de América’ de Juan Felipe Toruño [Hermeneutic Analysis of the Poem, ‘A Message to American Men,’ by Juan Felipe Toruño].” Analecta Literatia (Online journal published in Argentina) 31 August 2008.
29. “El Teatro del Oprimido de Boal y la Poetica de Aristóteles [The Oppressed Theatre of Boal and Aristotle's Poetic].” Analecta Literatia (Online journal published in Argentina) 4 October 2008.
30. “Distintos referentes y temáticas semejantes en las líricas de Joâo de Cruz e Souza y de Rubén Darío [Distinct Referents and Similar Thematics in the Lyrics of Joâo de Cruz and Rubén Darío].” Analecta Literatia (Online journal published in Argentina) 8 October 2008.
31. “Alejo Carpentier: Los ideales de la Revolucion Francesa constituyen el eje central en El Siglo de las Luces”. [Alejo Carpentier: The French Revolution ideals are the central turning point in El Siglo de las Luces] Analecta Literatia (Online journal published in Argentina) 11 December 2008.
32. “Distintos referentes y afines significantes en la muerte de Artemio Cruz y el siglo de las luces [Distinct references and related significances in the death of Artemio Cruz and the century of the lights].” Revista Ventana Abierta, Instituto de Estudios Chicanos, Universidad de California, Santa Bárbara, California. No. 33. Oct. 2012. 35–38.
33. “Elena Garro, pionera del realismo mágico, activista política y defensora de los campesinos [Elena Garro, pioneer of magical realism, political activist, and defender of peasants].” Revista de Cultura. No. 115. San Salvador, El Salvador, June 2015. 69–82.
34. “Ecos de la lirica poetica de Rubén Dario en algunos poemas de Juan Felipe Toruño [Echos of the lyrical poetry of Rubén Dario in some poems by Juan Felipe Toruño].” La Revista de La Universidad Nacional Autónoma de El Salvador, San Salvador, El Salvador. No. 29. Apr.-June 2016. 15–28.

== Sources ==
- Toruño Haensly, Rhina. "Curriculum Vitae". University of Texas of the Permian Basin.
- Carranza Bonilla, José Manuel; Chávez Escobar, Ana Margarita, eds. (2013). Las 100 historias que siempre quise saber; Personas exitosas de El Salvador [100 Stories that I Always Wanted to Know: Successful People from El Salvador]. Vol. III. San Salvador, El Salvador: Editorial G.T.C. ISBN 978-99923-957-0-7.
