= Johanna Toruño =

Salvadoran artist

Johanna Toruño (born December 1989) is a queer Salvadoran artist. She created The Unapologetic Street Series, a series of posters pasted across New York City that depict messages of queer pride.

== Biography ==
=== Early life ===
Toruño was born in San Salvador, El Salvador in 1989, during the Salvadoran Civil War. Growing up in El Salvador during the civil war and its aftermath, Toruño often heard gunfire, and to this day the sound of fireworks unsettles her.

She recognized at a young age how art could be used to amplify one's messages after seeing many political posters and murals.

A string of violent incidents convinced Toruño's mother that they needed to flee the country. She would not join her mother in the United States until 1999, at the age of 9, when she immigrated with her aunt. She arrived in the United States with only a few toys and her favorite Star Wars shirt.

=== Life in the United States ===
Toruño could not speak English when she immigrated to the US and became lonely because of this language barrier. Gradually, she taught herself English by watching Nickelodeon and Disney Channel programs with subtitles. While watching these programs, Toruño questioned gender roles for the first time. The heteronormative depictions of romance in mainstream media convinced Toruño that she could only be allowed to marry a woman if she went to work and acted masculinely. Today, Toruño's femininity is a recurrent subject of her art, along with her relationship to another woman.

Toruño was incarcerated at the age of 15, and she spent the next three years on probation. Eventually, she reached a turning point and wanted to alter the course of her life by expressing herself through art. She considered enrolling in art school but ultimately decided against it because she felt it was not possible for someone of her background.

=== Artist ===
Toruño was inspired by the political posters she grew up around in El Salvador. In 2016 she began creating and gluing posters around New York City. The series initially had the title The Unapologetically Brown Series, but once she realized there existed an Unapologetically Black movement, she renamed it to The Unapologetic Street Series.

Many of Toruño's posters can be found in Manhattan's Lower East Side. She glues them to walls, streetlights, and mailboxes – any area with significant foot traffic – using wheat paste. Toruño also sells her art on t-shirts and prints via pop-up shops she sets up across the country.

One of Toruño's goals is to spread her message across the United States, not just New York City. To do so, Toruño has spoken at colleges and hosted workshops in California, Texas, and Illinois, along with some others. In addition, Toruño uses Instagram to reach a global audience, and through that medium she has garnered over 50,000 followers.

== Subject matter and style ==
=== Queer visibility ===
Toruño envisions a future where queer children have access to mediums that depict them (and queer romance) instead of “being othered.” During her childhood, Toruño only had access to heteronormative television shows, and she feels that most queer characters depicted in the media struggle for acceptance, so she set out to create healthy, wholesome depictions of queer people and their relationships. This mission led Toruño to create the Niñas Sin Vergüenza (Girls Without Shame) series, which consisted of three photos of Toruño and her girlfriend, Amy Quichiz. Toruño pasted this series all over New York's Lower East Side in 2018. The series eventually inspired fan art of Toruño and Quichiz.

=== Unapologetic Street Series ===
The posters in the Unapologetic Street Series convey messages of queer pride. For example, one reads:

I WOKE UP BROWN

THE WAY MY MOTHER &

HER MOTHER MADE ME

THE WAY THE GODDESSES LAID

THE EARTH ON MY SKIN AS A

SHIELD

One of her pieces, The People's Alexandria Ocasio-Cortez, depicts congresswoman Alexandria Ocasio-Cortez against a backdrop of white flowers. Toruño uses all caps on her posters to contrast her motif of flowers, which she includes in her work as a reference to the jungles of El Salvador. Toruño often juxtaposes the soft texture of flowers with bold colors.

Due to her displacement from El Salvador, Toruño does not know much about her ancestors, so much of her inspiration comes from her role models. She depicts many of these role models, including Sylvia Rivera, Marsha P. Johnson, and Alexandria Ocasio-Cortez, on posters in The Unapologetic Street Series.

Toruño created The Unapologetic Street Series to “take up space.” In other words, she intended to promote queer visibility. Many of her works also include messages of mental health awareness and anticolonialism.

=== Street art ===
Toruño showcases her art in public spaces to spark conversations within the community. She believes street art well suits this goal because it is free and accessible. Many of her posters are pasted in the same locations to evoke the feeling of galleries.

== Personal life ==
Toruño considers herself an introvert. She describes her relationship with Amy Quichiz, the subject of her Niñas Sin Vergüenza series, as “ride or die.” In 2020, Toruño moved from New York to Washington, D.C.

== Notable works ==
The Unapologetic Street Series:

- The People's Alexandria Ocasio-Cortez

Niñas Sin Vergüenza (Girls Without Shame)
