= Romanica Olomucensia =

- Discipline: romance philology (literature, linguistics)
- Language: French, Italian, Portuguese, Spanish
- Edited by: Enrique Gutierrez Rubio

Publication details
- History: 2008–present
- Publisher: Palacký University, Olomouc (Czech Republic)
- Frequency: Biannually
- Open access: Yes

Standard abbreviations
- ISO 4: Romanica Olomuc.

Indexing
- ISSN: 1803-4136

Links
- Journal homepage

Romanica Olomucensia is a peer-reviewed half-yearly academic journal published by the Palacký University since 2008, as a continuation of Acta Universitatis Palackianae Olomucensis: Facultas Philosophica: Philologica: Romanica Olomucensia (1973–2007). It covers all aspects of Romance language linguistics, literature, history and culture.

The main aim of the journal, as outlined in its website, is "to create a bridge between the long-established Central European research tradition in these fields and specialists from Romance-language countries, especially in Europe, but also in America and Africa"

Its current editor-in-chief is Enrique Gutierrez Rubio (Palacký University). Among the members of the editorial board are such relevant scholars as Massimo Fusillo, Brad Epps, Michele Loporcaro, Mario Martín Gijón e Philippe Monneret.

The official language of the journal is English; however, RO hosts papers in French, Italian, Portuguese, and Spanish. The published papers are available to a free access through the website Dialnet.

== See also ==
- Olomouc
- Palacký University
- Philippe Monneret
