= Pedro Páramo =

1955 novel by Juan Rulfo

- First edition
- Author: Juan Rulfo
- Original title: Pedro Páramo
- Translators: Lysander Kemp (1959); Margaret Sayers Peden (1994); Douglas J. Weatherford (2023)
- Language: Spanish
- Publisher: Fondo de Cultura Económica
- Publication date: 1955
- Publication place: Mexico

Pedro Páramo is a novel by Mexican writer Juan Rulfo, first published in 1955. The novel tells the story of Juan Preciado, a man who promises his mother on her deathbed to meet Preciado's father for the first time in the town of Comala only to come across a literal ghost town, that is, populated by spectral characters. During the course of the novel, these ghostly inhabitants reveal details about life and afterlife in Comala, including that of Preciado's reckless father, Pedro Páramo, and his centrality for the town. Initially, the novel was met with cold critical reception and sold only two thousand copies during the first four years; later, however, the book became highly acclaimed. Páramo was a key influence on Latin American writers such as Gabriel García Márquez. Pedro Páramo has been translated into more than 30 different languages and the English version has sold more than a million copies in the United States. Gabriel García Márquez has said that he felt blocked as a novelist after writing his first four books and that it was only his life-changing discovery of Pedro Páramo in 1961 that opened his way to the composition of his masterpiece, One Hundred Years of Solitude. Moreover, García Márquez claimed that he "could recite the whole book, forwards and backwards." Jorge Luis Borges considered Pedro Páramo to be one of the greatest texts written in any language.

== Plot ==
=== Narrative structure ===
The story begins with the first-person account of Juan Preciado, who promises his mother on her deathbed that he will return to Comala to meet his father, Pedro Páramo. His narration is interspersed with fragments of third-person dialogue from the life of Pedro Páramo, who lived in a time when Comala was a robust, living town, instead of the ghost town Juan now sees. The two major competing narrative voices present alternative visions of Comala, one living and one populated with the spirits of the dead.

The novel is set in the fictional town of Comala and its surroundings, a reference to the real town of Comala in the Mexican state of Colima, close to Juan Rulfo's homeland.

=== Summary ===
The sequence of events for the plot is broken up in the work in a nonlinear fashion and is at times difficult to discern. The same occurs with the characters, as it is often impossible at first for the reader even to tell which characters are alive or dead.

The earliest moment in the story is Fulgor Sedano's arrival at Media Luna. His old patrón, Don Lucas, informs him that his son Pedro Páramo is totally useless and that he should go and get a new job when he dies. Later, Pedro's grandfather dies, and when his family prays for him after his death to help shorten his time in Purgatory, Pedro instead thinks about playing with Susana San Juan, the love of his life. They would fly kites near the village, and Pedro would help Susana fly hers. He is scolded for taking so long in the outhouse by his mother while he recalls this event. Soon after Señora San Juan dies, the San Juan family moves to the mining region. Exploring the Andromeda mine, Señor San Juan lowers Susana at the end of a rope into the old mine shaft. Searching for gold coins, Susana only finds a skeleton. Later in her life, her husband Florencio dies, and she's driven mad by the belief that he's still alive.

When Lucas Páramo is mistakenly killed at a wedding, Pedro later massacres most of the wedding guests. Fulgor Sedano informs Pedro about his father's debts to the Preciado family. To relieve these debts, they concoct a plan to marry Dolores Preciado. When Sedano tries to convince her, she informs him that she's menstruating and cannot be married so soon. Osorio later warns Dolores not to sleep with Pedro on their wedding night, so she begs Eduviges Dyada to sleep with him in her place. Eduviges agrees, but Pedro is too drunk to have sex.

Pedro's son Miguel is killed when, travelling to Contla, he jumps over a fence with his horse. Despite Miguel's cruel and irredeemable nature, Father Rentería absolves him after Pedro pays him in gold coins. Father Rentería remembers how Miguel killed his brother and raped his niece. Dorotea later confesses to Father Rentería that she was trafficking girls for Miguel Páramo; the priest cannot forgive her.

Pedro Páramo seeks to add Toribio Aldrete's land to his estate, and when Toribio visits the home of Eduviges, Pedro Páramo and Fulgor Sedano hang him. Later, Eduviges kills herself out of despair. Living in the Media Luna estate, Dolores Preciado leaves Pedro Páramo to live with her sister.

At the onset of the Mexican Revolution, the countryside has become too dangerous, and the San Juan family returns to Comala. When Señor San Juan dies, his ghost visits the crazed Susana, who only laughs. A stuttering man (Spanish: El Tartamudo) arrives at Pedro's house and informs him that revolutionaries have captured and killed Fulgor Sedano. To protect himself, Pedro invites local revolutionaries to his house for supper, promising them money and support. Pedro informs a revolutionary leader, El Tilcuate, that the money has run out and that he should raid a larger town for supplies.

When Susana San Juan dies, she refuses absolution by the priest, and Father Rentería pretends to give her last sacraments. The people of Comala have a large party, greatly annoying Pedro, who is mourning the loss of Susana. Out of spite, he lets the town die of starvation. The wife of Abundio Martínez, Refugia, dies of this starvation. He heads into town to drink, and finds Damiana Cisneros, the cook at the Media Luna. Abundio Martínez stabs her to death, captured and dragged to the Media Luna. There, Abundio kills Pedro Páramo, revealing that he's one of his illegitimate sons. As he dies, he thinks of Susana and sees the ghost of Damiana.

Dolores Preciado dies, and on her deathbed, she charges her son Juan to head to Comala and find his father Pedro Páramo. There, he finds the ghosts of Abundio, Eduviges, and Damiana, who tell him the stories of the town. He meets an incestuous couple, Donis and his sister, and spends the night at their house. Haunted by the ghosts of Comala, Juan dies of fright, buried in a shared grave with Dorotea. Trapped in his grave, he experiences the story and life of Pedro Páramo.

== Themes ==
Afterlife in Mexican Culture: The book deeply explores the roots of Mexican culture and its set of beliefs on afterlife, a mixture of indigenous ancient knowledge (souls and their dynamic connection to the physical realm) and Catholicism, in which nearly all characters aim to find redemption after death, both sets of beliefs being partly related to the concept of Karma where a soul "pays its dues" whether alive or after one's death. We see this extensively on all the spirits whom Juan encounters while he is still alive, for example, the mud woman who pays for the sin of sleeping with her brother, or Dorotea, who becomes the narrator with dead Juan towards the end of the novel.

There is also a concept of interconnection between the spiritual and physical realms, where most souls, even when their bodies die, are able to appear in the physical realm and interact with others who are still alive, this is the case of Miguel Paramo when he dies and appears at Eduvige's house, or the case with Damiana appearing to aid Pedro towards the end. Throughout the book, we see a constant leaping from the two realms, suggesting a non-linear sense of time and dimension. For example, on the day Lucas Paramo (Pedro's father) dies, we get to see how Lucas' soul touches young Pedro to literally wake him up. Another case is Susana, the day her father dies, she feels his presence on her bed (she doesn't even know he died). However, when she gets told about it the next day she immediately realizes it was her abusive Father's soul saying goodbye to her. Although most characters seem to already know this, they live peacefully with it, suggesting an acceptance of spirit interaction in the physical realm that is deeply rooted in Mexican culture.

Hope: A major theme in the book is people's hopes and dreams as sources of the motivation they need to succeed. Hope is each character's central motive for action. As Dolores tells her son, Juan, to return to Comala, she hopes that he will find his father and get what he deserves after all of these years. Despair is the other main theme in the novel. Each character's hopes lead to despair since none of their attempts to attain their goals are successful.

Juan goes to Comala instilled with the hope that he will meet and finally get to know his father. He fails to accomplish this and dies fearful, having lost all hope.

Pedro hopes that Susana San Juan will return to him after so long. He was infatuated with her as a young boy and recalls flying kites with her in his youth. When she finally returns to him, she has gone mad and behaves as though her first husband were still alive. Nevertheless, Pedro hopes that she will eventually come to love him. Dorotea says that Pedro truly loved Susana and wanted nothing but the best for her.

Father Rentería lives in hope that he will someday be able to fully fulfill his vows as a Catholic priest, telling Pedro that his son will not go to heaven, instead of pardoning him for his many sins in exchange for a lump of gold.

Ghosts and the ethereal nature of the truth are also recurrent themes in the text. When Juan arrives in Comala it is a ghost town, yet this is only gradually revealed to the reader. For example, in an episode with Damiana Cisneros, Juan talks to her believing that she is alive. They walk through the town together until he becomes suspicious as to how she knew that he was in town, and he nervously asks, "Damiana Cisneros, are you alive?" This encounter shows the truth as fleeting, always changing, and impossible to pin down. It is difficult to truly know who is dead and who is alive in Comala.

Sometimes the order and nature of events that occur in the work are not as they first seem. For example, midway through the book, the original chronology is subverted when the reader finds out that much of what has preceded was a flashback to an earlier time.

== Interpretation ==
Critics primarily consider Pedro Páramo as either a work of magic realism or a precursor to later works of magic realism; this is the standard Latin American interpretation. However, magical realism is a term coined to note the juxtaposition of the surreal to the mundane, with each bearing traits of the other. It is a means of adding surreal or supernatural qualities to a written work while avoiding total disbelief. Pedro Páramo is unlike other works of this type because the primary narrator states clearly in the second paragraph of the novel that his mind has filled with dreams and that he has given flight to illusion and that a world has formed in his mind around the hopes of finding a man named Pedro Páramo. Likewise, several sections into this narration, Juan Preciado states that his head has filled with noises and voices. He is unable to distinguish living persons from apparitions. Certain critics believe that particular qualities of the novel, including the narrative fragmentation, the physical fragmentation of characters, and the auditory and visual hallucinations described by the primary narrator, suggest that this novel's journey and visions may be more readily associated with the sort of breakdown of the senses present in schizophrenia or schizophrenia-like conditions rather than with magical realism.

== Meaning of title ==
The title underscores the importance of the character of Pedro Páramo. His life and decisions are key to the survival of the town of Comala. His last name means "barren plain" or "wasteland", which is what the town of Comala becomes as a result of his manipulations. He is not only responsible for the economic well-being of the town but also for the existence of many of its inhabitants. Among his offspring are Abundio, Miguel, and Juan, and countless others. He is regularly depicted raping women, and even Dorotea cannot keep track of all the women he has slept with. He is also responsible for the town's security. He strikes a deal with the revolutionary army mainly in his own self-interest and for protection. But being the owner of such a large swath of land, he is, by extension, in charge of the physical well-being of the town. An example of his power is his decision to allow Comala to starve and do nothing with the fields and with the crops. The town withers because of his apathy and indifference. The entire novel centers on his actions, appetites and desires.

== Characters ==
=== Main characters ===
==== Juan Preciado – Main Narrator ====
The story kicks off around Juan's commitment to find his father Pedro. As the plot progresses, he encounters different spirits at Comala and naively starts to recreate the story of the town to find out more about his father. He slowly starts to realize that the people he has encountered are actual spirits, which ignites a deep fear in him that would later cause his death.

It's suggested that Juan goes to Comala to redeem their parents' sins and to aid some of the spirits that live there reach redemption. He is born with the karma of being Pedro's son, and as we progressively see in the plot, there is a deeply rooted cultural belief (based on a mixture of indigenous spirituality and catholic religious ideals) that involves paying for one's sins whether while alive or in the afterlife. We can witness this when the mud lady spirit watches Juan shiver on the floor and says to her brother:" look at him, he must be paying some deaths". Suggesting Karma passed on from his dad. Pedro assassinated several individuals throughout the play. In fact, Juan hears and eventually sees some of the people his father killed.

Once Juan physically dies of fear, he remains narrating the story as a spirit (now accompanied by Dorotea) to keep unveiling the truth about his father and the town of Comala.

==== Pedro Páramo ====
Pedro Páramo is both protagonist and antagonist since his acts are at cross-purposes. He is capable of decisive action, as when he eliminated his debt and took over more land, but is unable to use that decisiveness to do any good for the community. He resembles a tragic hero in the way that he longs for Susana and is totally unable to get over her death. His one fatal flaw is her. He cannot function without her or the incentive of her. Pedro serves as a fertility god figurehead in the work. He not only literally impregnates many of the town's women, but he has many children (the priest brings many to his doorstep). He also is in charge of the well-being of Comala, but also can "cross his arms" and let Comala die. This shows that he has the power of life and fertility over the town. Pedro's name has great significance in the work. Pedro is derived from the Greek petrus, meaning 'rock', and Páramo, meaning 'barren plain'. This is ironic since in the end of the work Pedro collapses "like a pile of rocks" after observing what his land had become.

=== Minor characters ===
==== Susana San Juan ====
She is the love of Pedro's life since the beginning of Pedro's infant years. Her mother died friendless. She leaves the town with her dad Bartolomé at a young age, causing a deep wound in Pedro's heart. Throughout her life, she experiences constant abuse by her widowed father, which causes her to go mad. She goes mad mainly because she enjoys being sexually abused by Bartolomé (as we see on the scene where she sexually desires her father while being at Pedro's house). She knows this is a serious sin that, according to her beliefs rooted in Catholicism, is almost impossible to be forgiven, and thus, it wouldn't allow her to go to heaven. She lives her whole life knowing that she will go to hell.

She is the cause of Pedro's grief, who then refuses to work after her death and lets the town die.

==== Eduviges Dyada ====
Town's prostitute and good friend of Dolores Preciado. They promised to die together and help each other through the afterlife. She had died years ago and greets Juan when he arrives at Comala. She tells him of how she almost "came within a hair of being his mother" since she had to go and sleep with Pedro on their wedding night. She tells of her relationship and relations with Miguel Páramo and how it was she who saw his ghost before it left. Her sister, María Dyada, tells the priest that her suicide was out of despair and that she was a really good woman. He refuses to help her, and thus, her ghost remains in the town and purgatory. She dies with the idea that Abundio is a good man and does not know about him murdering Damiana.

==== Dolores Preciado ====
She was Juan's mother. She was wooed into marriage to Pedro by Sedano who said he thought of nothing but her all day and night and that her eyes were beautiful. Pedro owed her family the most money of all the other families, and her sisters had already moved to the city. She was married to annul the debt. Later, she is staring at a buzzard and wishes to be like it so that she could fly to her sister in the city. Pedro gets mad enough and dismisses her for good. They are never officially divorced. Her dying wish is for Juan to go and see his father and "make him pay for all those years he put us out of his mind".

==== Damiana Cisneros ====
She is the cook at the Media Luna and the ghost who takes Juan from Eduviges's house on that first night. She is sad to hear that Eduviges is still wandering the earth. Juan takes a while to realize that she is really a ghost and for a time, thinks that she is still alive. She was murdered by Abundio. She was also one of Dolores's good friends, and Juan knew about her when he arrived at Comala.

==== Abundio Martínez ====
He's another illegitimate son of Pedro's who works as the town's mail carrier. He is deaf because a rocket once went off near his ear. After that he did not talk much, and he became depressed. Later, his wife dies. He goes to get drunk at a local bar. Upon leaving he sees Damiana Cisneros and asks her for some money to bury his wife. He startles her, and she begins to scream. He then kills her, is captured, vomits, and is dragged to town. Eduviges calls him a good man.

==== Fulgor Sedano – mentor ====
He is the administrator of the Media Luna. Initially warned by Pedro's father not to trust him, he eventually becomes the enforcing hand of Pedro's schemes. He had been around the estate for many years serving the former patrons, Pedro's father Lucas and Lucas's father before that. He knows what to do and how to do it and boasts a number of achievements, including getting Dolores to marry Pedro. He is killed by a band of revolutionaries who view him as an embodiment of the privileged estate that they are fighting against. He also is responsible for having Toribio Aldrete hanged because he was trying to get the land surveyed to prove his right to some of it.

==== Miguel Páramo ====
He and Juan are both sons of Pedro Páramo. Miguel is the only son recognized by Pedro and was thus being groomed as the next Páramo heir. Miguel's character is the exact opposite to Juan. He is wild and a rapist, while Juan is quiet and respectful of women. He is fearless, whereas Juan dies of fear. He has a horse and rides it often, whereas Juan does not and has to travel by foot. His wantonness contrasts the calmness of Juan despite their shared parentage. Additionally, he is known for liking loose women and for murdering Ana's father. He also rapes Ana when he goes to her to apologize to her for killing him. He is thrown from his horse when going to another village to meet his current lover.

==== Dorotea – narrator ====
Town's beggar. She is the second narrator in the work. She tells the story of Comala before Pedro died after she is buried in the grave with Juan. Her storytelling dominates the second half of the work. She was known for being homeless and living on the charity of the people in the town. She had always tried to have children but had "the heart of a mother but a womb of a whore". She was known for her eccentric behavior by thinking that she had had a baby.

==== Father Rentería ====
Town's priest. He is really not the main character, but he possesses all the characteristics of one; for which he could be considered an antihero. He tries to stand up to Pedro and not give absolution to his son, Miguel. He has only the best intentions in mind but is unable to carry them out. His brother was killed by Miguel, and his niece was raped by Miguel as well when he came to apologize to her. He takes some gold to absolve Miguel, and he feels poorly about it, throwing himself in a corner and crying to the Lord.

He goes to another town to try to get himself forgiven of his sins so that he could continue to give the sacraments to the people of Comala. The other priest refuses, but they talk about how everything that grows in their region tastes sour and bitter. It is directly Father Rentería's fault that so many souls are stuck in Comala. He had failed in his duty to absolve those people and administer the last rite to them, and thus, they died and were unable to go to heaven. He is later mentioned as having joined the Cristero War.

==== Inocencio Osorio ====
He is the town's seer. He is the one who tells Dolores not to sleep with Pedro on her wedding night. His nickname is "Cockleburr" since he is well known to be able to stick to any horse and break it.

==== Toribio Aldrete ====
He is a property surveyor. He was splitting and dividing up Pedro's land and was going to build fences. He is stopped by a plot by Pedro and Sedano. They plot to try to stop him from doing the survey and draw up a warrant against him. Sedano goes to Eduviges's house one night with a drunken Aldrete and hangs him and throws away the keys to the room. He remains there in spirit and wakes Juan on his first night in Comala with his death screams.

==== Donis and his wife/sister ====
These two are some of the last living people in the town. Donis is suspicious of Juan and his motives for being there and thinks that he is a serious criminal, perhaps a murderer, and does not want him to spend the night. Donis is engaged in an incestuous relationship with his sister, started in an attempt to repopulate the town, although they once asked a bishop riding through town to marry them which he furiously refused, demanding they stop their relationship and "live like men". His wife/sister starts to like Juan after the first night and does a little extra to try to get him some more food since they have so little. She trades some of the old sheets for food and coffee with her older sister. Donis is glad that Juan showed up since he could now leave the town and have his wife/sister taken care of.

==== Justina ====
She is Susana's caregiver. She has taken care of her for many years, since she was born. She cried when Susana was dying, and Susana told her to stop crying. Justina is scared one day by the ghost of Bartolomé, who tells her to leave the town since Susana would be well cared for.

== See also ==
- Pedro Páramo (1967 film)
- Pedro Páramo (2024 film)
