= El gallo de oro (novel) =

Short novel by Mexican writer Juan Rulfo

The Golden Cockerel
- Author: Juan Rulfo
- Original title: El gallo de oro
- Translator: Douglas J. Weatherford
- Publisher: Editorial Era (orig.); Deep Vellum (transl.)
- Publication date: 1980
- Publication place: Mexico City
- English publication date: 2017
- ISBN: 9789684110304

El gallo de oro is a short novel (Note: The author described it as both a novel and a short story.) by the Mexican writer Juan Rulfo (1917–1986). Although written in the 1950s and registered for copyright in 1959, it was not published until 1980, with a revised edition in 2010. The Golden Cockerel, an English translation by Douglas J. Weatherford, was included in The Golden Cockerel & Other Writings (Deep Vellum, 2017).

== Plot ==
Dionisio Pinzón's life of poverty turns into one of riches and success after he rescues an injured fighting cock and nurses it back to health.

== Adaptations ==
The book has been adapted for the screen on several occasions:

- El gallo de oro (Mexico, 1964), with a screenplay by Carlos Fuentes, Gabriel García Márquez and Roberto Gavaldón (who also directed), and starring Ignacio López Tarso and Lucha Villa.
- El imperio de la fortuna (Mexico, 1986), directed by Arturo Ripstein and starring Ernesto Gómez Cruz and Blanca Guerra.
- La caponera (Colombia, 2000), a 146-part telenovela adaptation, starring Margarita Rosa de Francisco and Miguel Varoni.
- El gallo de oro (Mexico, 2023), a streaming television series starring Lucero Hogaza León and José Ron.
