= Enciclopedia de la literatura en México =

Digital encyclopaedia of Mexican literature

The Enciclopedia de la literatura en México ("Encyclopaedia of Literature in Mexico", ELeM) is an on-line encyclopaedia that provides information about Mexican writers and their works, literary movements and institutions, and writers from other countries whose works in some way bear a relation to the country. It was launched in 2012 by the National Council for Culture and Arts (CONACULTA) and the Fundación para las Letras Mexicanas, a civil association headed by former federal education secretary Miguel Limón Rojas.

It aims to provide reliable, up-to-date information through articles written by aspiring writers employed as interns, which are then verified by professional writers, supported by multimedia content in the shape of photographs and other illustrations and video and audio recordings. The multimedia content was greatly expanded in March 2014 when the Televisa broadcasting conglomerate agreed to share its collection of recordings relating to Nobel prize–winner Octavio Paz: a total of almost 200 hours of programming.

The ELeM is a component part of a broader CONACULTA project, the Proyecto Cultural del Siglo XXI Mexicano ("Cultural Project of the Mexican 21st Century"). Its creators say they were inspired to embark on this collective undertaking by the openness shown by Ignacio Manuel Altamirano, the paedagogical work of Justo Sierra and José Vasconcelos, and Paz's spirit of universalism.

The home page, in addition to a search engine, affords access to the encyclopaedia's contents through eight broad categories:

- People (further subdivided into authors, translators, mediators, and oral creators)
- Works (poetry, narrative, theatre, essay, bibliographic works, hybrid titles, and criticism and study)
- Panoramas (groups, aesthetics, literature and society, literature and other disciplines, philology and literary theory, the culture of publishing, the culture of translation, and linguistics)
- Publications (magazines/journals, supplements, sections, collections)
- Institutions (study, research, outreach)
- Multimedia (videos, audios)
- Library (a collection of public-domain texts from various sources)
- Oral literature
