= Juan Rulfo =

Mexican writer (1917–1986)

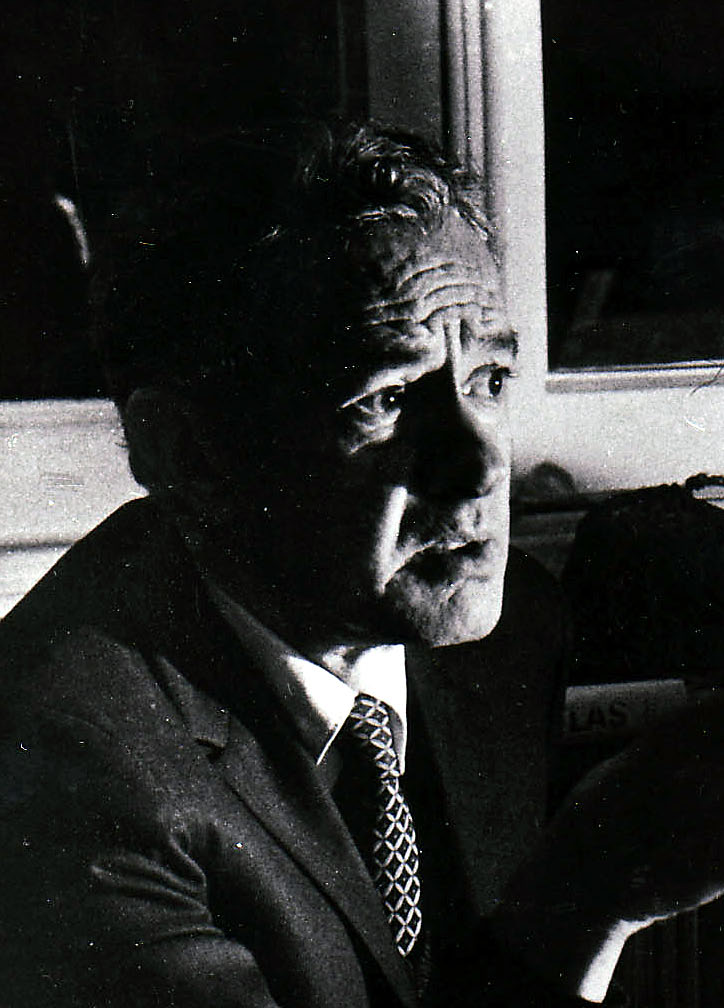
- Born: Juan Nepomuceno Carlos Pérez Rulfo Vizcaíno; 16 May 1917; Apulco, Jalisco (Disputed as being in San Gabriel, Jalisco), Mexico
- Died: 7 January 1986 (aged 68); Mexico City, Mexico
- Occupations: Writer, screenwriter, photographer
- Writing career
- Notable works: El Llano en llamas (1953); Pedro Páramo (1955)

Juan Nepomuceno Carlos Pérez Rulfo Vizcaíno, (Note: In this name that follows Hispanic American naming customs, the first or paternal surname is Pérez Rulfo and the second or maternal family name is Vizcaíno.) best known as Juan Rulfo (Spanish: [ˈxwan ˈrulfo]; 16 May 1917 – 7 January 1986), was a Mexican writer, screenwriter, and photographer. He is best known for two literary works, the 1955 novel Pedro Páramo, and the collection of short stories El Llano en llamas (The Burning Plain, 1953). In spite of Rulfo's slim literary production, he is considered one of the greatest Mexican and Latin American writers of the twentieth century who has influenced many subsequent writers including the Nobel laureate Gabriel García Márquez.

== Early life ==
Rulfo was born in 1917 in Apulco, Jalisco (disputed as being in San Gabriel, Jalisco), although he was registered at Sayula, in the home of his paternal grandfather. Rulfo's birth year was often listed as 1918, because he had provided an inaccurate date to get into the military academy that his uncle, David Pérez Rulfo — a colonel working for the government — directed.

After his father was killed in 1923 and his mother died in 1927, Rulfo's grandmother raised him in Guadalajara, Jalisco. Their extended family consisted of landowners whose fortunes were ruined by the Mexican Revolution and the Cristero War of 1926–1928, a Roman Catholic revolt against the persecutions of Christians by the Mexican government, following the Mexican Revolution.

Rulfo was sent to study in the Luis Silva School, where he lived from 1928 to 1932. He completed six years of elementary school and a special seventh year from which he graduated as a bookkeeper, though he never practiced that profession. Rulfo attended a seminary (analogous to a secondary school) from 1932 to 1934, but did not attend a university afterwards, as the University of Guadalajara was closed due to a strike and because Rulfo had not taken preparatory school courses.

Rulfo moved to Mexico City, where he entered the National Military Academy, which he left after three months. He then hoped to study law at the Universidad Nacional Autónoma de México. In 1936, Rulfo was able to audit courses in literature at the university, because he obtained a job as an immigration file clerk through his uncle.

== Career ==
At the University Rulfo began writing under the tutelage of a coworker, Efrén Hernández. In 1944, Rulfo co-founded the literary journal Pan. Later, he was able to advance in his career and travel throughout Mexico as an immigration agent. In 1946, he started as a foreman for Goodrich-Euzkadi, but his mild temperament led him to prefer working as a wholesale traveling sales agent. This obligated him to travel throughout all of southern Mexico, until he was fired in 1952 for asking for a radio for his company car.

Rulfo obtained a fellowship at the Centro Mexicano de Escritores, supported by the Rockefeller Foundation. There, between 1952 and 1954, he was able to write two books.

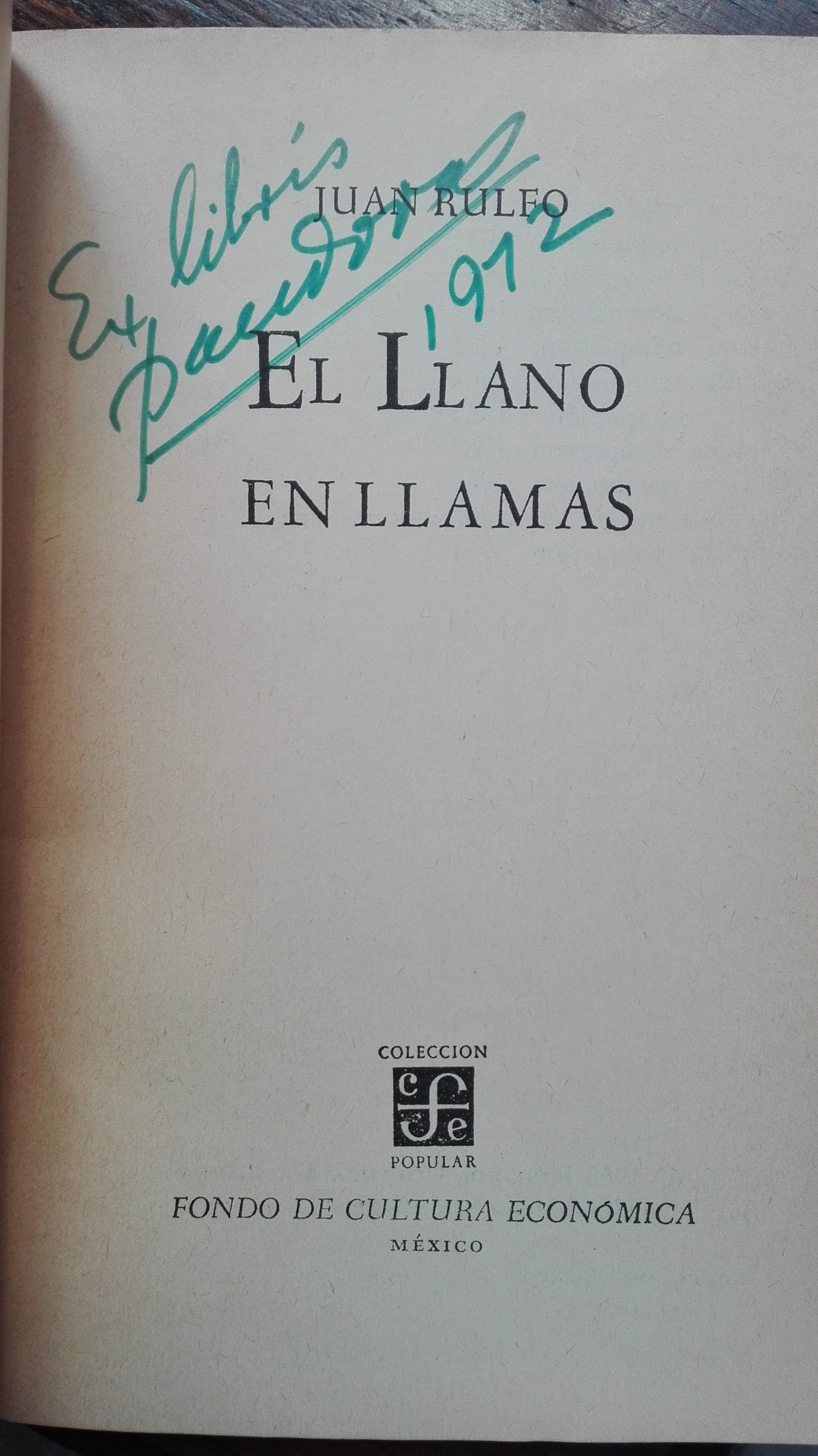
El Llano en llamas.

The first book was a collection of harshly realistic short stories, El Llano en llamas (1953). The stories centered on life in rural Mexico around the time of the Mexican Revolution and the Cristero War. Among the best-known stories are "¡Diles que no me maten!" ("Tell Them Not To Kill Me!"), a story about an old man, set to be executed, who is captured by order of a colonel, who happens to be the son of a man whom the condemned man had killed about forty years earlier. The story contains echoes of the biblical Cain and Abel theme as well as themes related to the Mexican Revolution, such as land rights and land use. In the story "No oyes ladrar los perros" ("Do You Hear the Dogs Barking?") a man carries his wounded adult son on his back to find a doctor. His monologue reveals the burdens of a father facing the complicated truth of a son who became a bandit and killed his own godfather. The story "El hombre" ("The Man") evinces a complex narrative structure consisting of alternating voices and eventually revealing a complex cycle of violence. Rulfo's spare descriptive style, dialogues often revealing colloquial language and harsh landscapes metaphoric of the many characters' existential crises elevates Mexican regional fiction to a more universal stage.

Rulfo's second book was Pedro Páramo (1955), a short novel about a man named Juan Preciado who travels to his recently deceased mother's hometown, Comala, to find his father, only to find a deserted village populated by spectral figures. Through uncanny encounters with these figures, his own death and dialogues among the ghosts a portrait of a cruel despotic strongman Pedro Páramo is revealed. Again, Rulfo turns what could on the surface be considered regional literature into a story replete with universal myths, such as the search for the father, love triangles, revenge, solitude, etc. Initially, the novel met with cool critical reception and sold only two thousand copies during the first four years; later, however, the book became highly acclaimed. Páramo was a key influence for Latin American writers such as Gabriel García Márquez. Pedro Páramo has been translated into more than 30 languages, and the English version has sold more than a million copies in the United States.

The book went through several changes in name. In two letters written in 1947 to his fiancée Clara Aparicio, he refers to the novel he was writing as Una estrella junto a la luna (A Star Next to the Moon), saying that it was causing him some trouble. During the last stages of writing, he wrote in journals that the title would be Los murmullos (The Murmurs). With the assistance of a grant from the Centro Mexicano de Escritores, Rulfo was able to finish the book between 1953 and 1954; it was published in 1955.

In passages of the novel Pedro Páramo, the influence of American novelist William Faulkner is notable, according to Rulfo's former friend, philologist Antonio Alatorre.

Between 1956 and 1958, Rulfo worked on a novella entitled El gallo de oro (The Golden Cockerel), which was not published until 1980. A revised and corrected edition was issued posthumously in 2010. The Fundación Rulfo possesses fragments of two unfinished novels, La cordillera and Ozumacín. Rulfo told interviewer Luis Harss that he had written and destroyed an earlier novel set in Mexico City.

From 1954 to 1957, Rulfo collaborated with the Río Papaloapan Commission, a government institution working on socioeconomic development of the settlements along the Papaloapan River. From 1962 until his death in 1986, he worked as an editor for the National Institute for Indigenous People.

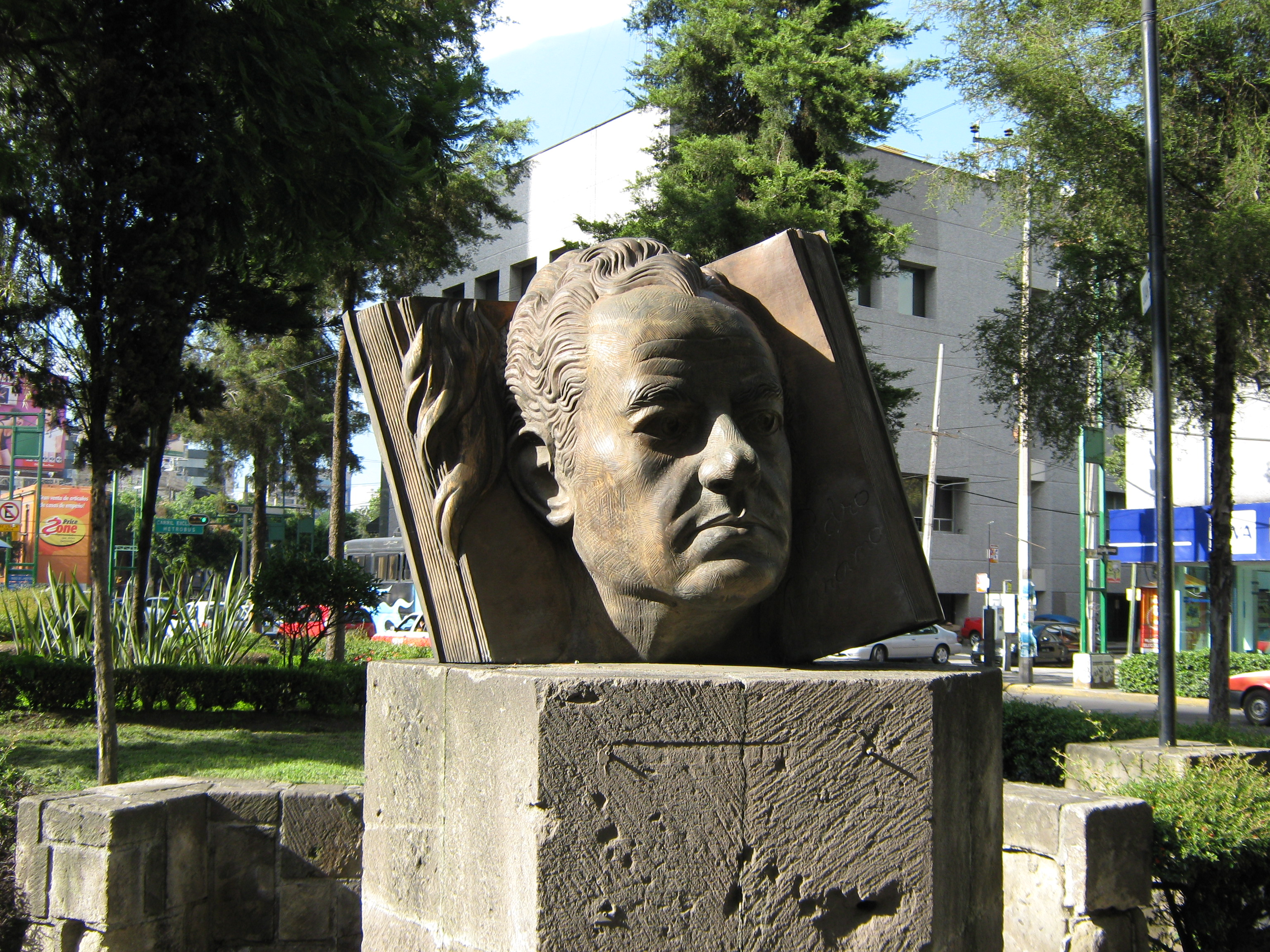
Bust of Rulfo in Juan Rulfo Park in Mexico City.

== Personal life ==
Rulfo married Clara Angelina Aparicio Reyes (b. 12 August 1928) in Guadalajara, Jalisco, on 24 April 1948; they had four children: Claudia Berenice (born 1949), Juan Francisco (1950), Juan Pablo (1955) and Juan Carlos (1964).

== Legacy ==
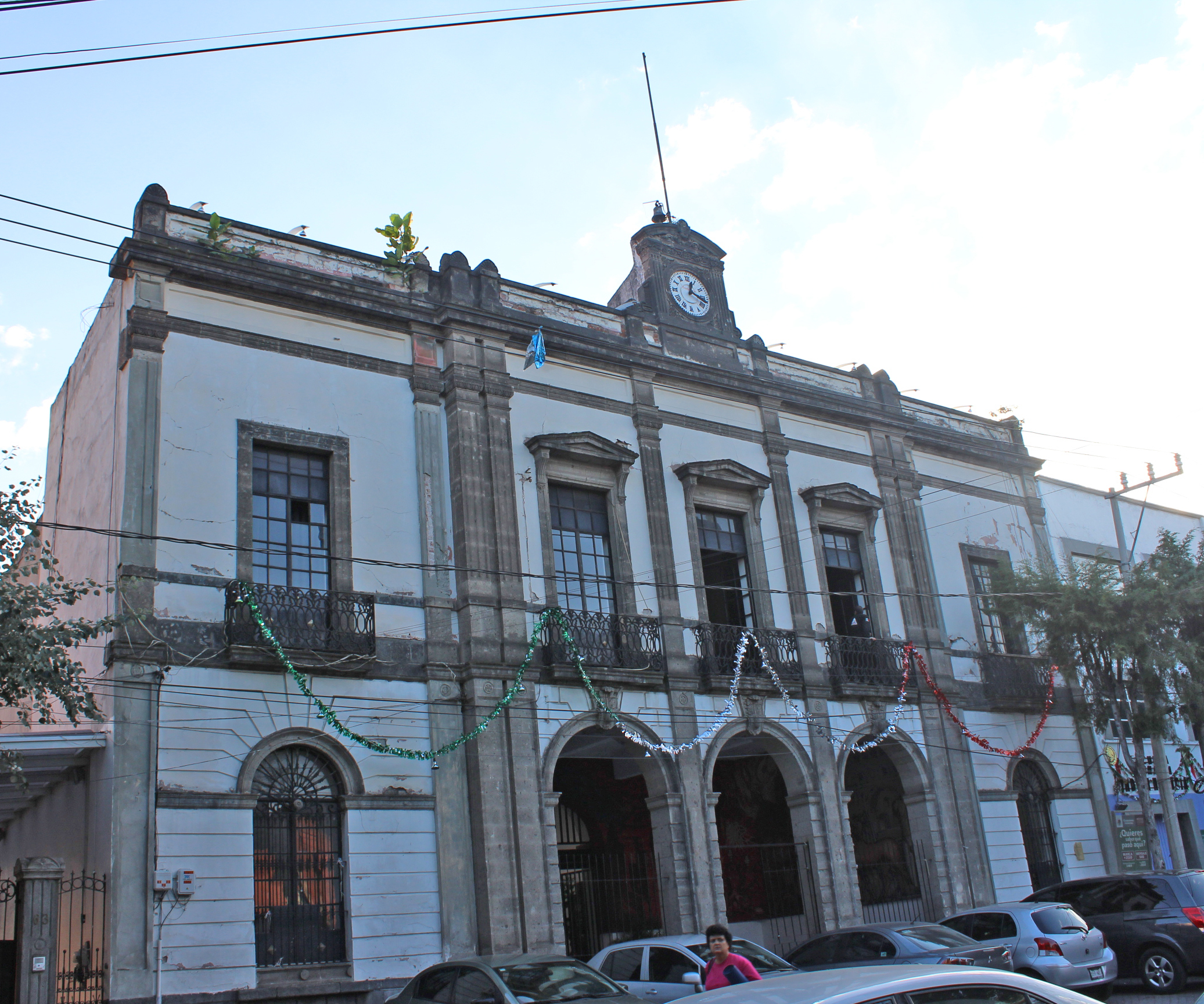
Juan Rulfo Cultural House.

Gabriel García Márquez has said that he felt blocked as a novelist after writing his first four books and that it was only his life-changing discovery of Pedro Páramo in 1961 that opened the way to the composition of his masterpiece, One Hundred Years of Solitude. He noted that all of Rulfo's published writing, put together, "add up to no more than 300 pages; but that is almost as many and I believe they are as durable, as the pages that have come down to us from Sophocles".

Jorge Luis Borges considered Pedro Páramo to be one of the greatest texts written in any language.

The Juan Rulfo Foundation, which was established by Rulfo's family after his death, holds more than 6,000 negatives of his photographs. A selection of Rulfo's photographs, accompanied by essays by Carlos Fuentes and others, has been published under the title of Juan Rulfo's Mexico.

== Awards, scholarships and recognitions ==
- 1952: Scholarship from the Mexican Center of Writers

== Books ==
- El Llano en llamas (1953). Translated by George D. Schade as The Burning Plain (University of Texas, 1967); Ilan Stavans and Harold Augenbraum as The Plain in Flames (University of Texas, 2012); Stephen Beechinor as El Llano in Flames (Structo, 2019); Douglas J. Weatherford as The Burning Plain (University of Texas, 2024).
- Pedro Páramo (1955). Translated by Lysander Kemp (Grove Press, 1959); Margaret Sayers Peden (Grove Press, 1994); and Douglas J. Weatherford (2023).
- El gallo de oro (1980; revised 2010). Translated by Douglas J. Weatherford as The Golden Cockerel & Other Writings (Deep Vellum, 2017).

== Further reading and Comments ==
=== Spanish ===
- Lecturas rulfianas / Milagros Ezquerro, 2006
- Tríptico para Juan Rulfo: poesía, fotografía, crítica / Víctor Jiménez, 2006
- La recepción inicial de Pedro Páramo / Jorge Zepeda (Editorial RM-Fundación Juan Rulfo, México, 2005. ISBN 84-933036-7-4)
- Entre la cruz y la sospecha: los cristeros de Revueltas, Yáñez y Rulfo / Angel Arias Urrutia, 2005
- Estructura y discurso de género en Pedro Páramo de Juan Rulfo / Alba Sovietina Estrada Cárdenas, 2005
- Voces de la tierra: la lección de Rulfo / Felipe Garrido, 2004
- Mito y poesía en la obra de Juan Rulfo / María Luisa Ortega, 2004
- La ficción de la memoria: Juan Rulfo ante la crítica / Federico Campbell, 2003
- Juan Rulfo / Nuria Amat, 2003
- Análisis de Pedro Páramo, Juan Rulfo / César Pérez P, 2003
- Homenaje a Juan Rulfo / Dante Medina, 2002
- Perfil de Juan Rulfo / Sergio López Mena, 2001
- Revisión crítica de la obra de Juan Rulfo / Sergio López Mena, 1998
- Juan Rulfo / Alberto Vital Díaz, 1998
- La sociedad en la obra de Juan Rulfo / Magdalena González Casillas, 1998
- Rulfo en su lumbre: y otros temas latinoamericanos / Jaime Mejía Duque, 1998
- Juan Rulfo, el eterno: caminos para una interpretación / Anita Arenas Saavedra, 1997
- Juan Rulfo: la naturaleza hostil / Antonio Aliberti, 1996
- Recopilación de textos sobre Juan Rulfo / La Habana, Cuba: Centro de Investigaciones Literarias, 1995
- Los caminos de la creación en Juan Rulfo / Sergio López Mena, 1994
- Juan Rulfo: la lengua, el tiempo y el espacio / Gustavo C Fares, 1994
- Juan Rulfo, del Páramo a la esperanza: una lectura crítica de su obra / Yvette Jiménez de Báez, 1994
- Juan Rulfo y el sur de Jalisco: aspectos de su vida y obra / Wolfgang Vogt, 1994
- El laberinto y la pena: ensayo sobre la cuentística rulfiana / Rafael José Alfonzo, 1992
- Imaginar Comala: el espacio en la obra de Juan Rulfo / Gustavo C Fares, 1991
- Rulfo y el dios de la memoria / Abel Ibarra, 1991
- Rulfo, dinámica de la violencia / Marta Portal, 1990

=== Photography ===
- Mexico: Juan Rulfo Fotógrafo, 2001: The Spanish language edition of his photographs with essays by the same authors as the volume above, but written in Spanish.
- Inframundo: El México de Juan Rulfo / 1st ed. 1980, 2nd ed. 1983 / Versions in Spanish and English with essays. Published in 1980/83 by Ediciones del Norte in Hanover, New Hampshire
- Juan Rulfo: Letras e imágenes, RM, 2002. The book is outlined in: https://web.archive.org/web/20110613163940/http://www.clubcultura.com/clubliteratura/clubescritores/juanrulfo/letrasimagenes01.htm
- http://www.guiarte.com/noticias/juan-rulfo-fotografo.html
- http://www.elpais.com/articulo/cultura/ojos/Pedro/Paramo/elpepuint/20070903elpepicul_2/Tes
- https://web.archive.org/web/20110519065034/http://elangelcaido.org/2005/11/200511jrulfo/200511jrulfoe.html
