= Gabriel Ripstein =

Film producer, director, editor and screenwriter

- Born: 1972
- Occupation(s): Film producer, director, editor, screenwriter
- Years active: 1998–present
- Children: 1
- Parent: Arturo Ripstein

Gabriel Ripstein (born 1972) is a Mexican film producer, director, editor and screenwriter. A producer since 1999, Ripstein has been involved in nine feature films (including two directed by his father, Mexican film director Arturo Ripstein). Two of his productions competed for the Palme d'Or at the Cannes Film Festival: El Coronel No Tiene Quien le Escriba and Chronic. Ripstein also wrote screenplays for Amor a Primera Visa, Compadres, and Busco novio para mi mujer.

He made his directorial debut in 2015 with 600 Millas, starring British actor Tim Roth and Mexican actor Kristyan Ferrer, for which he received the Best First Feature Film Award at the 65th Berlin International Film Festival. The film received good reviews, and was selected to represent Mexico at the 88th Academy Awards for Best Foreign Language Film. For his work on 600 Millas Ripstein received five nominations for the 58th Ariel Awards, including Best Picture, Best Director, and Best Original Screenplay. He won the Best First Feature Film award.

== Early life and background ==
Ripstein was born in 1972 to Mexican film director Arturo Ripstein; his grandfather was film producer Alfredo Ripstein. He has a degree in economics, and an MBA in Media Management from Columbia Business School. Later, he ran the Mexico local language film production unit for Sony Pictures Entertainment and he was then named Senior Vice President of the International Motion Picture Production Group at Sony Pictures Entertainment.

== Film career ==
I'm lucky, because I was born on a movie set, it is what I have seen my whole life; I thought life were cable cords and projectors, I was lucky, but I always wanted to direct and hid it for some reason and entered the industry by the business side.

— Gabriel Ripstein in ¡Hola!.

=== Producing El Coronel No Tiene Quien le Escriba and La Perdición de los Hombres ===
Ripstein debuted as a producer in 1999 with the film adaptation of El Coronel No Tiene Quien le Escriba by Colombian novelist Gabriel García Márquez, about a retired colonel waiting 27 years for his pension. The film, directed by his father from a screenplay by his mother, starred Mexican actors Fernando Luján and Salma Hayek and Spanish actress Marisa Paredes. It represented Mexico at the 72nd Academy Awards for Best Foreign Language Film, and competed for the Palme d'Or at the 1999 Cannes Film Festival.

With a $3-million budget, El Coronel No Tiene Quien le Escriba was a critical and box-office success. Variety reviewer Leonardo Garcia Tsao called the film a "deeply moving adaptation", confirming "Ripstein's standing as Mexico's foremost auteur". It grossed $83 million internationally, at the time the highest-grossing Latin film ever. In 2000 Ripstein produced La Perdición de los Hombres, another film directed by his father and written by Paz Alicia Garciadiego. According to Matías Meyer of Nexos, it was released during a dry period for Mexican films and was an international box-office and critical success. Meyer cited the film, along with Amores Perros, Y Tu Mamá También, El Crimen del Padre Amaro, Japón and Nicotina, as examples of the "huge visual and thematic richness in the country". David Rooney of Variety called it "a uniquely entertaining experience".

=== Writing Amor a Primera Visa and producing El Crimen del Cácaro Gumaro ===
In 2013 Ripstein, Georgina Riedel, Issa López and Oscar Orlando Torres wrote the screenplay for Amor a Primera Visa, starring Mexican actors Jaime Camil and Omar Chaparro. In the film, Camil is a mariachi player eager to get an American visa for him and his daughter and falls in love with an embassy officer (Laura Ramsey). The screenplay was described by Mexican film magazine Cine Premiere reviewer Fran Hevia as having a "lack of substance", in an overly long film with "the classic formula of 'he deceives her, they fall in love, she discovers the deceit, he tries to win her back'". Amor a Primera Visa earned $7 million in Mexico and $5 million in the United States. Produced by Ripstein, El Crimen del Cácaro Gumaro was released in 2014 and earned $4 million in Mexico. Receiving mixed reviews, it was the year's eighth-most-popular Mexican film in that country.

=== Directorial debut with 600 Millas ===
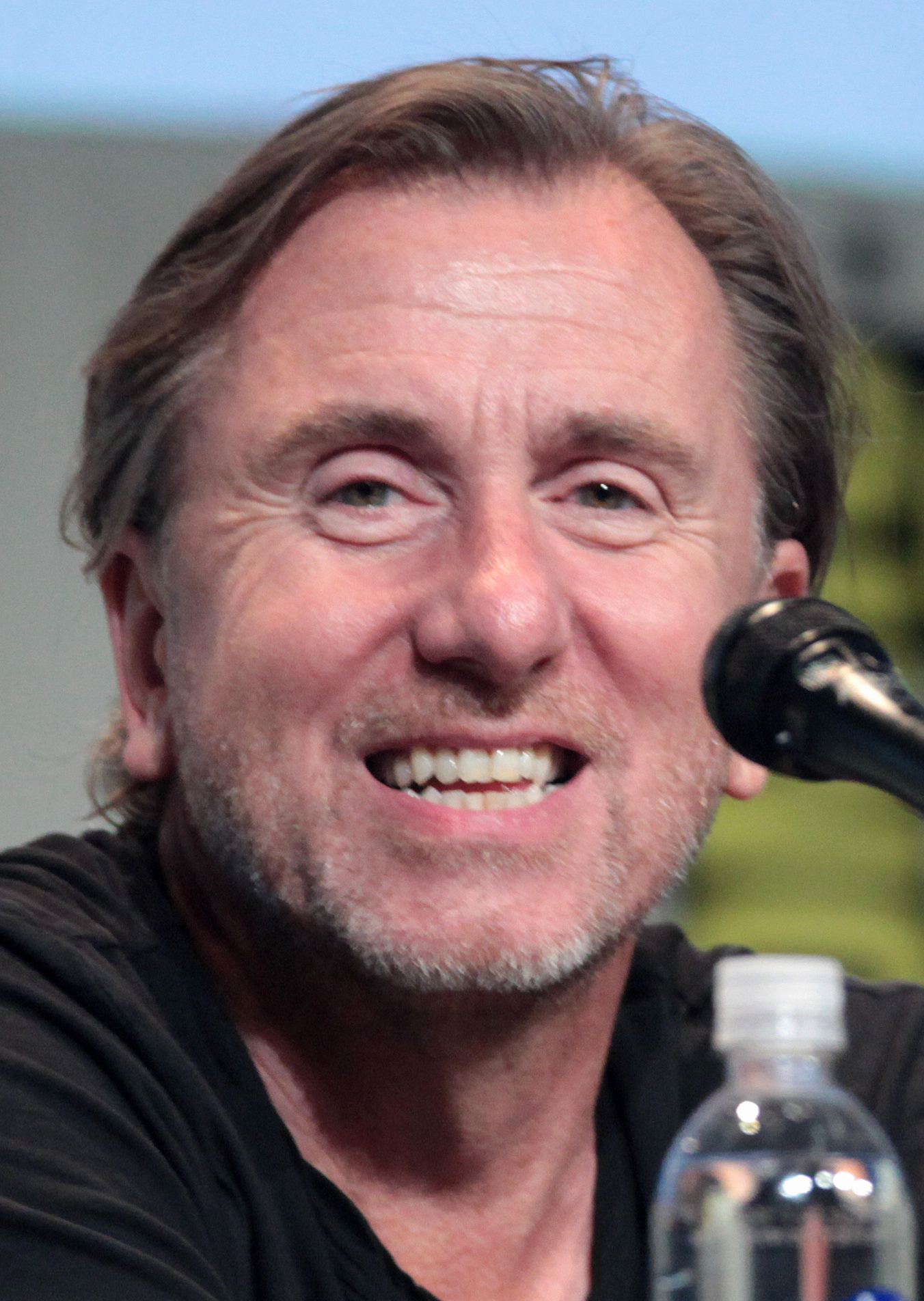
British actor Tim Roth starred in 600 Millas, directed by Ripstein.

Ripstein made his directorial debut in 2015 with 600 Millas, producing the film with Mexican director Michel Franco. The screenplay, by Ripstein and Issa López, was inspired by the ATF gunwalking scandal. In the film, weapons smuggler Arnulfo Rubio (Kristyan Ferrer) works for a Mexican cartel. ATF agent Hank Harris (Tim Roth), who tries to arrest him, is kidnapped by Rubio to bring to his bosses; during the 600-mile (970 km) drive, they became friends. Ripstein wanted to focus the story on the two characters, rather than expanding it to include the cartel leaders. He attempted to express his view of guns "objectively, almost like a documentarian", since he has been exposed to guns from an early age; his grandfather took him and his brother shooting on weekends, and "my brother became an exceptional shot; they hunted ducks and my grandmother cooked them". 600 Millas premiered in the Panorama Section of the 65th Berlin International Film Festival, where it won the Best First Feature Film award (the second consecutive award for a Mexican film; Alonso Ruizpalacios' Güeros won the previous year). Ripstein dedicated the award to his son, "who will surely be the fourth generation of our family to make films because he loves it".

600 Millas opened on 150 screens in Mexico on December 4, 2015, and was selected to represent the country at the 88th Academy Awards in the Best Foreign Language Film category. About the process of receiving an Academy Award nomination, Ripstein said: "Much lobbying is required; unfortunately, film quality is not always decisive". The nominees that year represented Colombia, France, Jordan, Denmark, and Hungary (the eventual winner).

Review aggregator website Rotten Tomatoes reported a 92-percent approval rating based on 24 reviews, with a rating average of 7.7 out of 10. According to Peter Debruge of Variety, "Ripstein allows long stretches to go by in near-silence, gradually letting the tension build as the SUV travels farther south, deeper into potentially dangerous territory". Andrew Pulver of The Guardian gave 600 Millas three stars out of five, praising Roth's performance and calling the film a "pretty enterprising movie, subtly constructing its power relationship while not losing its grip on the basic sense of tension".

In 2016, 600 Miles received 13 nominations for the 58th Ariel Awards. Ripstein received five, including Best Picture, Best Director, Best Original Screenplay (with López), Best Editing (with Santiago Pérez Rocha), and won the Best First Feature Film award. He also won the Best First Feature Film award and was nominated for Best Director at the 2016 Diosas de Plata Awards in Mexico.

=== Producing Chronic, From Afar, and writing films directed by Enrique Begne ===
Ripstein, Moisés Zonana, and Michel Franco produced Franco's Chronic (2015). The film competed for the Palme d'Or and received the Best Screenplay Award at the 2015 Cannes Film Festival, was screened out of competition at the San Sebastián International Film Festival and was nominated for Best Film at the 2016 Independent Spirit Awards. Chronic premiered in Mexican theaters on April 8, 2016; at the end of its first week, it was among the top ten most-watched films in the country. Ripstein, Franco, Lorenzo Vigas, Guillermo Arriaga, Rodolfo Cova, and Édgar Ramírez produced From Afar, a film directed by Vigas which won the Golden Lion at the 72nd Venice International Film Festival and was screened at the 13th Morelia International Film Festival.

In 2016, two films written by Ripstein and directed by Enrique Begne were released. Compadres, starring Omar Chaparro and Erick Elías and co-written by Ted Perkins, received generally negative reviews; Rotten Tomatoes reported a 33-percent approval rating based on 15 reviews, with a rating average of 4.4 out of 10. Metacritic, which assigns a weighted average to critical reviews, gave the film a score of 28 out of 100 based on five reviews. The second film, Busco novio para mi mujer, was adapted by Risptein and Pablo Solariz from the Argentine film Un novio para mi mujer (2008) and starred Sandra Echeverría, Arath de la Torre, and Jesús Ochoa. Ripstein was praised by Claudia Blix of the Ruiz-Healy Times for his versatility in writing drama and comedy. Arturo Magaña of Cine Premiere was surprised by Ripstein's involvement in a romantic comedy after 600 Millas and Chronic and wrote about the film, "It is a good romantic comedy that follows the rules of the genre, it is entertaining and has well-structured characters".

== Filmography ==
Year	Film	Director	Producer	Writer	Notes
1999	El Coronel No Tiene Quien le Escriba		Yes		
2000	La Perdición de los Hombres		Yes		
2013	Amor a Primera Visa			Yes	
2014	El Crimen del Cácaro Gumaro		Yes		
2014	Princesa		Yes		Short film
2015	Chronic		Yes		
2015	From Afar		Yes		Executive producer
2015	600 Millas	Yes	Yes	Yes	
2016	Compadres			Yes	
2016	Busco novio para mi mujer			Yes	Adapted from the Argentinian film Un novio para mi mujer (2008)
2016	Narcos (TV series)	Yes			
2018	Un Extraño Enemigo (TV series)	Yes	Yes	Yes	
2018	Aquí en la Tierra (TV series)	Yes			
