= The Virgin of Lust =

- Spanish theatrical release poster
- Spanish: La virgen de la lujuria
- Directed by: Arturo Ripstein
- Screenplay by: Paz Alicia Garciadiego
- Based on: La verdadera historia de la muerte de Francisco Franco by Max Aub
- Produced by: Mate Cantero; Álvaro Garnica; Luisa Matienzo; Stéphane Sorlat
- Starring: Ariadna Gil; Luis Felipe Tovar; Juan Diego; Julián Pastor; Patricia Reyes Spíndola; Daniel Giménez Cacho; Carlos Chávez; Alberto Estrella
- Cinematography: Esteban de Llaca
- Edited by: Fernando Pardo
- Music by: Leoncio Lara
- Production companies: Mate Production; Tusitala PC; Iberautor Promociones Culturales; Producciones Amaranta; Fado Filmes; Foprocine
- Distributed by: Lauren Films (es)
- Release dates: 30 August 2002 (Venice); 6 September 2002 (Spain)
- Running time: 2h 31min
- Countries: Spain; Mexico; Portugal
- Language: Spanish

The Virgin of Lust (Spanish: La virgen de la lujuria) is a 2002 Spanish-Mexican-Portuguese drama film directed by Arturo Ripstein from a screenplay by Paz Alicia Garciadiego. It is loosely based on Max Aub's story La verdadera historia de la muerte de Francisco Franco (1960).

== Plot ==
The film is set in Mexico in the 1940s. Nacho works for tyrannical racist Don Lázaro in the Café Ofelia. He falls in love with Spanish prostitute Lola.

== Cast ==
- Luis Felipe Tovar as Nacho Jurado
- Ariadna Gil as Lola
- Patricia Reyes Spíndola as Raquel
- Juan Diego as Gimeno-Mikado
- Julián Pastor as Don Lázaro
- Alberto Estrella as Gardenia Wilson
- Daniel Giménez Cacho as Toledano

== Release ==
Distributed by Lauren Films, the film was released theatrically in Spain on 6 September 2002.

== Reception ==
Deborah Young of Variety considered that patient viewers are rewarded by "a memorable vision of sexual obsession as an everyday matter, paralleled to the devastation wreaked by great movements of history and politics".

Ángel Fernández-Santos of El País considered the film to be "a magnificent direct hit of surreal cinema between the eyes that fascinates and, unfortunately, also makes you dizzy".

== Awards ==
- Fipreci Prize at the Rio de Janeiro International Film Festival (2002)

== See also ==
- List of Spanish films of 2002
