= Francesca Guillén =

Mexican actress (born 1977)

- Born: Mónica Trueba Guillén; June 14, 1977 (age 48); Mexico City, Mexico
- Occupation: Actress
- Parents: Alejandro Camacho (father); Bárbara Guillén (mother)

Mónica Trueba Guillén (known as Francesca Guillén; born June 14, 1977) is a Mexican film, theater, and television actress.

== Biography ==
Guillén was born in Mexico City on June 14, 1977, the daughter of actor Alejandro Camacho and actress Bárbara Guillén. Her acting career began in 1982, at age 5, on the television program Juguemos a cantar.

In 2000, she appeared in the feature film Such Is Life, directed by Arturo Ripstein and based on Seneca's Medea. This was shown at international festivals such as San Sebastian, Cannes, and Havana.

In 2007, she traveled with Ofelia Medina's troupe, taking Cada quien su Frida to stages in Spain, the United States, Cuba, and Denmark. She remained in the latter for a time, studying at the Odin Teatret under the direction of Eugenio Barba, with whom she collaborated during 2008 and 2009 on the productions The Medea Marriage and Ur-Hamlet.

In 2011, she received an award for Female Revelation from the Theatrical Journalism Association (APT) for her performance in the Jaime Chabaud play Lluna. She also participated in the play El Placer de Nuestra Lengua, which premiered in 2010.

Her first appearance in an American production took place in 2005 under the direction of independent filmmaker Zev Berman, in the thriller Borderland. During 2014 she joined the show Infieles. She also participated in the children's play El Cajón de los Secretos, and during 2013 she was part of the casts of La Hora by Luis Koellar for Micro Teatro and Juegos Profanos with a season on Radio UNAM, directed by Eduardo Ruiz Saviñón.

During 2012 she starred in the play Alicia subterránea, also directed by Eduardo Ruiz Saviñon. She premiered Mujer lagartija by Cutberto López, starring alongside Cecilia Toussaint, under the direction of Aarón Hernández Farfán as part of the Perpetual Voices cycle at the Shakespeare Forum. She also joined the cast of the show Negro Animal Tristeza, directed by Rodrigo Johnson.

She participated in the INBAL reading promotion programs Leo... luego existo and ¿Quieres que te lo lea otra vez?

During January 2015 she appeared in A Doll's House under the direction of Rodrigo Johnson.

Francesca Guillén has had an extensive career that includes appearances in short films, feature films, telenovelas, dance productions, narrative, and theater. She has integrated acrobatics and martial arts as well as other disciplines into her physical training.

== Filmography ==
=== Telenovelas ===
- Mi segunda madre (1989) – Luisita Peña
- Agujetas de color de rosa (1994–1995) – Débora/Fernanda
- Confidente de secundaria (1996) – Belén
- Sin ti (1997–1998) – Sandra
- Camila (1998–1999) – Cecilia
- Locura de amor (2000) – Lucinda Balboa
- Atrévete a olvidarme (2001) – Lucina
- Clase 406 (2002–2003) – Paloma/Samsara Nájera
- Apuesta por un amor (2004–2005) – Matilde Cruz
- Rebelde (2005–2006) – Ana

=== TV series ===
- Videoteatro Cosa Juzgada "Campo de Ortigas" (1993)
- Videoteatro Cosa Juzgada "La Santa" (1993)
- Mujer, Casos de la Vida Real (lead in 15 episodes, 1997–2005)
- Historias para contar (2005)
- Drunk History Mx, Capítulo 1, Temporada 1 (2015)
- Drunk History Mx, Temporada !! (2016)

=== Feature films ===
- El hijo perdido (1994)
- La segunda noche (1999)
- Such Is Life (2000)
- Sangre joven (2003)
- La edad de la ciruela (2004)
- Santos Peregrinos (2004)
- Cañitas (2005)
- Mosquita muerta (2005)
- Borderland (2007)
- El principio de la espiral (2007)
- El que vendrá (2010)

=== Short films ===
- La gata que vino a cenar (1991)
- El tren (1992)
- Las motos son de hombres (1996)
- Al Borde (1998)
- Rear View (1999)
- La cuarta llamada (2002)
- Coyote 13 (2003)
- Sin ti (2003)
- Peces de Asfalto (2004)
- Refugio... De aquí a ninguna parte (2005)
- Encuentro Ausente (2006)
- La Tercer Orden (2007)
- Educada Memoria (2008)
- A Better Place to Be (2011)
- En el lago (2011)
- Hermelinda (2011)
- Come (2014)
- Emma (2014)
- Goes and Runs (2014)

=== Theater ===
- Canto Verde (1982)
- Descubrimiento (1989)
- Vaselina show (1989)
- Las ruinas de Bernarda Alba (1992)
- Justinne (1998)
- De la calle (2001)
- The Vagina Monologues (2004)
- Cada quien su Frida (2006–2008)
- Espina y Flor (2009)
- Lluna (2010)
- El Placer de Nuestra Lengua (2010)
- Alicia Subterránea (2012)
- Mujer Lagartija (2012)
- Negro Animal Tristeza (2012)
- Baño de Mujeres (2013)
- Juegos Profanos (2013)
- La Hora (2013)
- El Cajón de los Secretos (2014)
- Infieles (2014)
- Amor a Muerte (2015-2016)
- Bella Maldad (2015)
- De tangos, cronopios y autonautas (2015)
- Doggie (2015)
- A Doll's House (2015)
- Faustaff (2015)
- Fosa, Rodrigo Gonzales (2015)
- Los desaparecidos, Teatro Clown (2015)
- Mujeres de Par en Par (2015)
- En las Montañas Azules (2016)
- La Expulsión del Paraíso, Auto dirección (2017)
- Instinto, Barbara Colio (2017)
