= Alfredo Ripstein =

Mexican film producer (1916–2007)

Alfredo Ripstein (Alfredo Ripstein Aronovich) (December 10, 1916, Parral, Chihuahua, Mexico — January 20, 2007, Mexico City) was a Mexican film producer of Polish-Jewish descent. He is credited with helping shape Mexico's film industry in the period surrounding World War II. Ripstein helped start the careers of several contemporary Mexican actors such as Gael García Bernal and Salma Hayek.

== Early life ==
Ripstein's family was of Polish Jewish origins. Ripstein's father was a timber merchant in Parral. Members of Pancho Villa's army were the main customers of his parents' store. Ripstein's mother asked Villa for permission to close the store in order to give birth to Alfredo. Villa stopped by the store a few days later to see the newborn. "So the first man that ever carried my father was Pancho Villa", Ripstein's son Arturo told Los Angeles Times reporter Reed Johnson.

Ripstein's family moved to Mexico City when he was 5 years old. Ripstein first worked as an accountant and then was hired by Simon Wishnack's Filmex company as a production manager and executive producer.

== Career ==
Ripstein opened his own company, Alameda Films, in 1948. One of his final feature films was El Crimen del Padre Amaro in 2002. It was produced with his grandson, Daniel Birman. He also produced in 2004 Birth of a Passion, also with his grandson Daniel Birman. In 2005 he executive produced The Red Queen: A Mayan Myatery for Discovery Channel.

Ripstein had collaborated with his son Arturo on several films, including the 1999 adaptation of Gabriel García Márquez's novel No One Writes to the Colonel and The Beginning and the End, adapted from the novel by Egyptian author Naguib Mahfouz.

He produced more than 120 films.

== Death ==
Ripstein died of respiratory failure at his home in the Polanco district of Mexico City. He was survived by his wife and son, two daughters, seven grandchildren and six great-grandchildren at the time of his death.

== Filmography ==
- Memories of the Future (1968), adapted from Los Recuerdos del Porvenir
- The Crime of Padre Amaro (2002)
