= Tiempo de morir =

1966 film directed by Arturo Ripstein

Tiempo De Morir
- Theatrical release poster
- Directed by: Arturo Ripstein
- Written by: Carlos Fuentes; Gabriel García Márquez
- Produced by: Alfredo Ripstein hijo César Santos Galindo
- Starring: Marga López; Jorge Martínez de Hoyos; Enrique Rocha; Alfredo Leal; Blanca Sánchez; Tito Junco; Quintín Bulnes
- Cinematography: Alex Phillips
- Edited by: Carlos Savage
- Music by: Carlos Jiménez Mabarak
- Production company: Alameda Films
- Distributed by: Alameda Films; Tamasa Distribution (2017) (France) (theatrical); Film Movement (2016) (USA) (all media)
- Release date: August 11, 1966 (Mexico)
- Running time: 90 minutes
- Country: Mexico
- Language: Spanish

Tiempo de Morir (Time to Die) is a 1966 Mexican Western film directed by Arturo Ripstein and starring Marga López and Jorge Martínez de Hoyos. Screenplay was written by Nobel Prize winner Gabriel García Marquez and novelist Carlos Fuentes, their first realized film.

== Synopsis ==
Juan Sayago returns to his hometown after spending 18 years in prison for killing a man, Trueba, in cold blood. When Trueba's son, Julian, hears Sayago has returned to town he demands that Sayago face him in a duel to avenge his father's death. However Julian's brother, Pedro begins to doubt Sayago is an honorless killer after meeting Sayago and spending time with him. Then Pedro hears from his fiancé's father that in reality Trueba had provoked Sayago till he was forced to kill him to preserve his honor as a man. Pedro tells Julián but he is unswayed by these stories and beats Pedro for even suggesting their father was anything less than perfect. Julian continues harassing Sayago by following him around and destroying what's left of his house until finally Sayago is forced to once again face Julian as he did his father to preserve his honor. Sayago kills Julian, and in return, Pedro is forced to kill Sayago.

== Cast ==
- Marga López as Mariana Sampedro
- Jorge Martínez de Hoyos as Juan Sayago
- Enrique Rocha as Pedro Trueba
- Alfredo Leal as Julián Trueba
- Blanca Sánchez as Sonia
- Luis Aragón as Pablo, Dueño de la hacienda
- Tito Junco as Comisario
- Quintín Bulnes as Diego Martin
- Miguel Maciá as Boticario
- Hortensia Santoveña as Rosita
- Carlos Jordan as Casildo
- Carolina Barret as Madre de Sonia
- Claudio Issac as Claudio Sampedro
- Arturo Martínez as Cantinero compadre de Juan
- Manuel Dondé as Peluquero
- Leonardo Castro as Sepultero
- Cecilia Leger as ama de llaves
- Chabelo Jiménez as Herrador
- Luz María Velázquez as Nana

== Reception ==
On review aggregator Rotten Tomatoes, the film has an approval rating of 100% based on seven reviews, with an average rating of 8/10. John DeFore on The Hollywood Reporter called the film "a gem of a vintage Mexican Western that feels its moral quandaries deeply". Robert Abele from Los Angeles Times wrote: "Shot in a crisp black-and-white that treasures bleak long shots as much as thrillingly nervous camera movement, "Time to Die" turns the showdown narrative of so many oaters into an actively intelligent, darkly funny and no less suspenseful rumination on the pull of the horizon versus the ill wind at the back." Ben Sachs from Chicago Reader stated: "This was the first feature directed by Arturo Ripstein (Deep Crimson), and already he demonstrates a refined aesthetic sensibility in his use of curvilinear camera movements to chart the development of interpersonal relationships." Alan Scherstuhl from The Village Voice wrote: "Spare and heartsick, Arturo Ripstein’s 1966 cycles-of-violence western parable Time to Die finds nothing romantic in showdowns and shootouts. It’s a swift slow burn of a film, the story of a man who once got pushed too far with terrible results now getting pushed too far again, with results that are, as the title suggests, sure to be worse. The screenplay may come from novelists — it’s credited to no less than Gabriel Garcia Marquez and Carlos Fuentes — but don’t look to it for novelistic expansiveness. Ripstein’s debut is pared down, whetted to a cutting sharpness."

In 1967, won a "Best Film (Mejor Película)" award given by the "Mexican Cinema Journalists".
