= Guillermo Iván =

Mexican actor and author

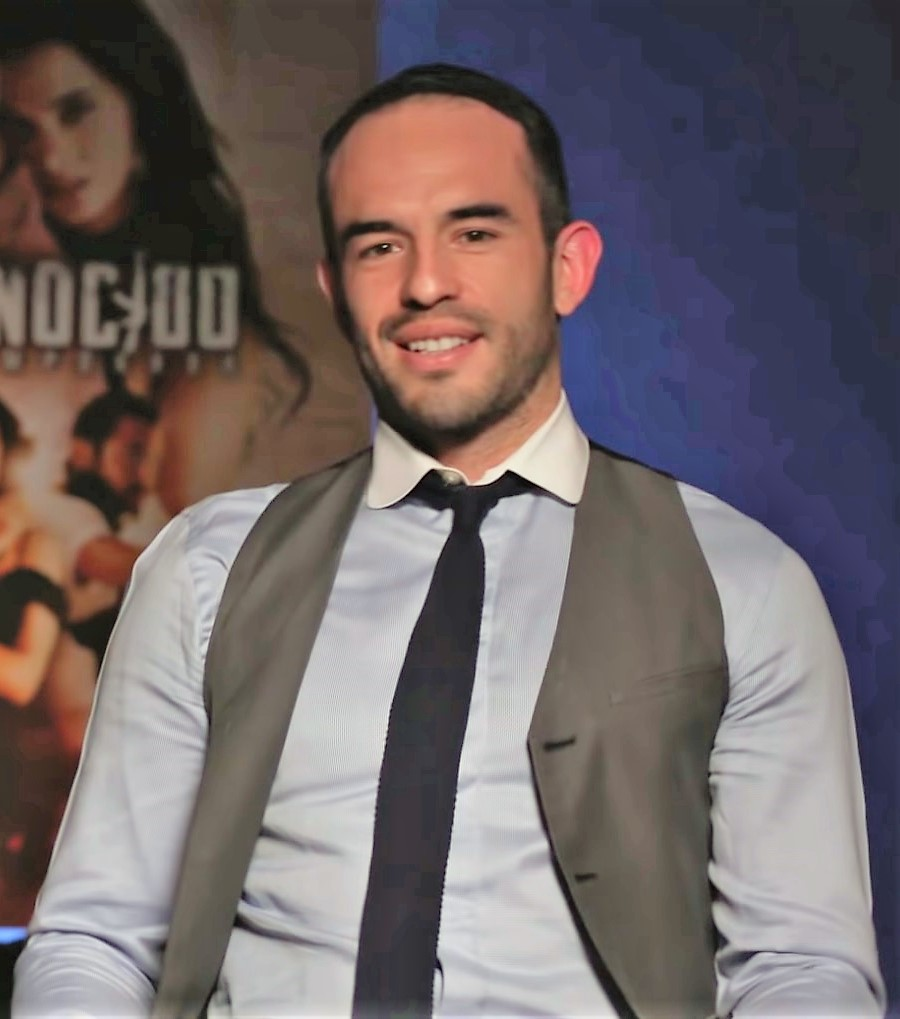
- Iván interviewed by Dulce Osuna in 2019
- Born: Guillermo Iván Dueñas Lazcano; January 19, 1981 (age 45); Mexico City, Mexico
- Education: University of Havana
- Occupations: Actor; director; producer; writer
- Years active: 1989–present

Guillermo Iván Dueñas Lazcano (born 19 January 1981) is a Mexican actor, director, writer, and producer. Born in Mexico City, Mexico. He is best known for his characters in Mexican and American films. On television he made himself known as part of the main cast of Telemundo's telenovela Al otro lado del muro. Graduated from the Faculty of Arts and Letters at the University of Havana, Guillermo Iván received a degree in production and direction from the National Union of Writers and Artists of Cuba.

== Filmography ==
Film roles
Year	Title	Roles	Notes
1989	Mentiras piadosas	Unknown role	
1992	Armas de fuego	Child Narcizo	
1998	La primera noche	Cheriff	
1998	El evangelio de las maravillas	Centurión Pablo	
2002	Sueños de un suicida	Sergio	
2002	Sueños de un suicida	Sergio	
2002	Espejo retrovisor	Fabián	
2003	Casa de los Babys	Reynaldo	
2004	Cero y van 4	Álvaro	
2005	Castigo divino	Hippolytus	Short film
2007	Trade	Alejandro	
2008	Vantage Point	Felipe	
2008	La milagrosa	Lagarto	
2008	Mexican standoff	Nicolás "Nick" Quintero	
2008	María Navajas II	Nicolás Quintero	
2009	Trece años	Son	Short film
2009	Sin retorno	Mau	
2009	Primero, no hacer daño	Emilio	
2010	Sin memoria	Beto	
2011	Labios rojos	Miguel	
2012	Elliot Loves	Fabian	
2012	Carrusel	Gio Hoyos	
2013	El Hombre de Negro II	Juan Pablo Juárez	
2013	Bolaetrapo	El Bam Bam	
2014	Yerbamala	Fermín	
2014	Blue Family	Armando	
2015	Habana Instant	Marcelo	
2016	The Strike	Alberto	
2016	Amar y desear: To Love and Lust	Beto	
2016	Departed Son	Nicholas	Short film
2018	Havana Darkness	Carlos	
2019	Primero, no hacer daño	Emilio	
2019	Welcome to Acapulco	Rafael	also director
2020	Lady of Guadalupe	John Martinez and St. Juan Diego	
2022	As Good as Dead "Hector"	Papajohn 2025 Real Ones “Joseph Santiago”	

Television roles
Year	Title	Roles	Notes
1993	Dos mujeres, un camino	Unknown role	
1994	El vuelo del águila	Unknown role	
1999	Yacaranday	Timoteo	
2004	Las Juanas	Miguel	
2006	Ángel, las alas del amor	Enrique	
2013	Corazón en condominio	Henry Jonas	
2015	UEPA! Un escenario para amar	Aldo	
2018	Al otro lado del muro	Joel Benítez	Main cast; 77 episodes
2018	The UnKnown Hitman The Story of El Cholo Adrian	El Cholo	Main cast; No. of Seasons 2 No. of Episodes 13
