= Such Is Life (2000 film) =

2000 film

- Film poster
- Directed by: Arturo Ripstein
- Written by: Paz Alicia Garciadiego
- Produced by: Álvaro Garnica; Laura Imperiale; Jorge Sánchez
- Starring: Arcelia Ramírez
- Cinematography: Guillermo Granillo
- Edited by: Carlos Puente
- Music by: David Mansfield
- Release date: 14 September 2000
- Running time: 98 minutes
- Country: Mexico
- Language: Spanish

Such Is Life (Spanish: Así es la vida) is a 2000 Mexican drama film directed by Arturo Ripstein. An updated version of Seneca's play Medea, it was screened in the Un Certain Regard section at the 2000 Cannes Film Festival.

== Cast ==
- Arcelia Ramírez - Julia
- Patricia Reyes Spíndola - Adela, The Godmother
- Luis Felipe Tovar - Nicolás
- Ernesto Yáñez - La Marrana
- Alejandra Montoya - Teenager
- Marta Aura - (as Martha Aura)
- Daniela Carvajal
- Constanza Cavalli
- Beto Alonso Gil
- Francesca Guillén - Raquel
- Osami Kawano
- Loló Navarro
- Andrés Weiss
- Marco Zapata
