= Luis Felipe Tovar =

Mexican actor

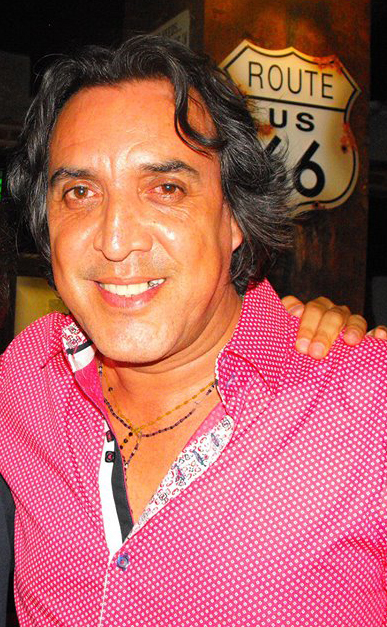
Luis Felipe Tovar

Luis Felipe Tovar (born December 2, 1959, in Puebla) is a Mexican performance teacher and actor.

He studied in the Theatre Fine Arts School of Mexico and in the Escuela Internacional de Cine y Televisión de La Habana in Cuba.

He has been awarded three times with the Ariel Award: 1993, Principio y Fin, 1995, El Callejón de los Milagros and 1997, Sin remitente.

In 2003 he left his old school of performance to open the bar Muxe, whose clients are mainly homosexuals. He has a son named Tadeo and a daughter named Maria Fernanda. He played in telenovela Por Ti.

== Films ==
- Mi secreto (2022)
- The Mighty Victoria (2021) as The one-eyed
- Malverde: El Santo Patrón (2021)
- El carnaval de Sodoma (2006)
- Patrulla 81 the movie (2005)
- El bulto para presidente (2005)
- Gente común (2006)
- Una de balazos (2005) as El Carnal
- Isy (2005)
- Ver, oir y callar (2005)
- De ángeles, flores y fuentes (2005) as Joel Villaseñor
- Superhéroe (2004)
- 7 mujeres, 1 homosexual y Carlos (2004) as Boss
- @Festivbercine.ron (2004)
- Un diluvio (2004)
- Ciudad de perros (2004)
- La mudanza (2003)
- Fantasías (2003) as Miguel
- La hija del caníbal (2003) as Borracho
- Pandillero traficante (2003)
- Esclavo y amo (2003) as Ricardo
- Asesinato en lunes de carnaval (2002)
- The Virgin of Lust (2002) as Nacho
- Vivir mata (2002) as Chepe
- Barrio 13, Part 2 (2002)
- Atlético San Pancho (2001) as Claudio
- De la calle (2001) as Chicharra
- The Mexican (2001)
- Cuando seas mia (2001)
- Santo: Infraterrestre (2001) as Comandante Sarmiento
- Nuria y el fantasma (2001)
- Buitres al acecho
- Por Ti (2001)
- La perdición de los hombres (2000)
- Así es la vida (2000) as Nicolás
- Beat (2000) as Federale Sergeant
- Barrio 13 al desnudo (2000)
- El carretonero(2000)
- Entre la tarde y la noche (1999)
- Santitos (1999) as Doroteo
- Circuito interior (1999)
- Todo el poder (1999) as Comandante Eleuterio 'Elvis' Quijano
- Superstition (1999) as Pachucocodrilo
- Maldito amor: Demasiado tarde (1999)
- Luces de la noche (1998)
- Justo como en una película porno (1998)
- Mujer ladina (1998)
- Wash and Wear (1998)
- Men with Guns (1997) as Barbero
- Los vuelcos del corazón (1996)
- La nave de los sueños (1996)
- Parejas (1996)
- Victoria (1996)
- Overkill (1996) as Desk Clerk
- La ley de las mujeres (1995) as Mario
- Sin remitente (1995) as Luis Felipe
- Bienvenido-Welcome (1995) as José Molina/León de la Lama
- Dos crímenes (1995) as Invitado 1
- El callejón de los milagros (1995) as Güicho
- Félix, como el gato (1995)
- Cilantro y perejil (1995) as Pablo
- La orilla de la tierra (1994)
- The Beginning and the End (1993) as César
- Se equivocó la cigueña (1993)
- El bulto (1992) as Alfonso
- Ciudad de ciegos (1991) as Gandalla
- Como fui a enamorarme de ti (1991)
- Futuro sangriento (1991)
- La ciudad al desnudo (1989) as El King
- Un verano para la ballena (1988)
- El misterio de la araña (1986)
- Tacos de oro (1985) as Marciano
- Tacos yum
- El recluso (Serie tv 2018)
