= Pulling Strings (film) =

- US Poster
- Spanish: Amor a primera visa
- Directed by: Pedro Pablo Ibarra
- Screenplay by: Gabriel Ripstein
- Starring: Laura Ramsey; Jaime Camil; Omar Chaparro; Tom Arnold; Stockard Channing; Roberto Sosa; Aurora Papile; Renata Ybarra
- Production companies: Pantelion Films; Traziende Films; Byg Studio
- Distributed by: Lionsgate Distribution
- Release dates: October 4, 2013 (USA); November 8, 2013 (Mexico)
- Languages: English; Spanish
- Box office: $13.7 million

Pulling Strings (better known in Spanish as Amor a primera visa) is a 2013 English and Spanish-language Mexican-American romantic comedy film directed by Pitipol Ybarra and starring Laura Ramsey and Jaime Camil. It is about a single father and struggling Mariachi singer who falls for a U.S. Embassy employee while seeking for a visa for his daughter.

== Plot ==
In Mexico City, Alejandro Fernandez is a struggling Mariachi singer whose wife died two years prior. His daughter, Maria, is struggling in school and hardly sees her father because of his job. To make things better, he is planning to get a visa so Maria would stay with her grandparents in Arizona. However, Rachel Simons denies him a visa. Rachel, an intelligent diplomatic, works for the embassy of the United States of America. After getting promoted in London, Art, her boss, entrusts her final duty: to take care of a laptop loaded with data, until he returns from the out-of-town business. Rachel's overbearing mother belittles her daughter's lifestyle because she isn't happy about her promotion in London.

Rachel's co-workers surprise her with a goodbye party in which Alejandro and his band were hired to perform in. He spots Rachel and attempts to draw her attention multiple times in vain. After Rachel becomes intoxicated and suddenly leaves the party, Alejandro finds her attempting to sleep in a bus stop. He helps her up and calls a taxi to bring her into his home to rest.

The following morning, Maria tickles Rachel, causing Rachel to awaken in panic. After finding out her drunken state the night before, she realizes that she misplaced her laptop. Alejandro locates it next to her clothing but hides it, and offers help on finding it with his comical best friend and band member, Carlos Nicanor "Canicas" Castro. Alejandro assumes that if he remains close to her and gains her trust, he can convince her to give him a visa for Maria. To make his plan seem believable, Alejandro calls others in Mexico City to aid him in his "search" for Rachel's laptop. Throughout the next two days, he takes Rachel to the bar where her party was held, the embassy, a taxi cab company president, a black-market dealer and a computer repair shop.

While meeting with the computer repairman, Alejandro forgets that he has to perform for Maria, and arrives late at her school. After watching his performance, Rachel develops close feelings for Alejandro. She explains that she had a hard time connecting with others. Her father traveled across the world for his job, before he died away from his family, which made it difficult for Rachel to bond with other people and develop strong relationships.

Prior to those two days, Alejandro was supposed to pay the money to Hapi, a loan shark. Due to his negligence, Hapi has his home burglarized, taking Rachel's laptop with him. Alejandro has three hours to pay him 20,000 pesos. In order to meet this amount of money, Rachel suggests the idea of selling his albums and performing with his band. After singing one of his songs, the two kissed. When Alejandro arrives to pay Hapi, he refuses, because he is short of 2,000 pesos. As a last resort, Rachel gives Hapi her watch that her boss gave to her. While retaking his things, Alejandro and Canicas see that the laptop was not in its case, but do not reveal this fact to Rachel. When the three arrive home, Alejandro sees the computer lying on his table with a note from Maria. He takes this note and has Canicas put the computer back in the laptop case and gives it back to Rachel.

Throughout her experience, Rachel was happy that she lost the laptop because she met Alejandro, and they sleep together. In the morning, she finds Maria's stickers on the keyboard of the laptop and feels betrayed that Alejandro manipulated Rachel to obtain a visa. Alejandro tries to explain that the city is not a safe environment for his daughter, which is why he wanted a visa. Rachel leaves and refuses to speak to him.

After leaving him, Alejandro becomes depressed due to his actions. Rachel still chooses London to make things better. Her mother finally accepts her daughter's choices regarding her career. She wants what is best for Rachel, and that is all it matters to her. Canicas tries to cheer Alejandro up. As Rachel is getting ready to leave for London, Carol and Canicas help drive Alejandro to the airport to apologize and tell her that he loves her and attempts to persuade her to stay. He also explains the truth about making things right for Maria. But she refuses and leaves, still heartbroken. One month later, Maria finishes 3rd Grade. During the evening, Alejandro and Maria hear mariachi music through the window and sees Rachel. Rachel reveals that she still has feelings for Alejandro, saying “there’s no you in London.” The two embrace and kiss.

== Cast ==
- Laura Ramsey as Rachel Simons
- Jaime Camil as Alejandro Fernandez
- Omar Chaparro as Carlos Nicanor "Canicas" Castro
- Tom Arnold as Art, Rachel's boss
- Stockard Channing as Virginia, Rachel's mother
- Catherine Papile as Carol, Rachel's friend and co-worker
- Roberto Sosa as Hapi
- Renata Ybarra as Maria, Alejandro's daughter

== Production ==
Pulling Strings is based in Mexico's capital and showcases everything the city has to offer. Jaime's Alejandro character has to help Rachel locate a missing computer and, in the interim, introduces her to a lively culture she never knew existed. But as a director for Ybarra, there were some issues when it came to meshing the English and Spanish components. Ybarra, who is a Mexican native, had to learn to overcome a slight language barrier when instructing his American actors.

== Release ==
Pulling Strings was released in theaters on October 4, 2013. It was released on DVD on February 25, 2014.

== Box office ==
Total domestic gross is $5,842,961. The opening weekend in the USA was $2,467,168. In worldwide, the total lifetime gross was $13,725,819.

== Reception ==
The film has a 58% approval rating on the review aggregator website Rotten Tomatoes, based on 12 reviews.
