= Marina Tsurtsumiya =

Moscow-based director and activist

- Марина Романовна Цурцумия
- Born: Marina Romanovna Tsurtsumiya; February 3, 1964 (age 61); Moscow, Russian SFSR, Soviet Union
- Occupation(s): Film director, activist, restaurateur
- Years active: 1980s–present
- Notable work: Only Death Comes for Sure (1993)

Marina Tsurtsumiya (Russian:Марина Романовна Цурцумия; February 3, 1964) is a Moscow-based director and activist best known for her 1993 film Only Death Comes for Sure.

== Early life and education ==
Tsurtsumiya was exposed to the film industry at a young age by her parents. Her mother, studying at VGIK to become a film critic, would take Tsurtsumiya to classes with her. Her father, Roman Tsurtsumiya was a camera-operator who worked with Sergei Gerasimov and as a director of photography for Sergei Bondarchuk. He later became a director in his own right. Tsurtsumiya's father inspired her to take up the craft, “He took me on shoots with him sometimes when I was still very young, 7 or 8. That’s when I decided that my future would be in the cinema.”

In her final year of secondary school, Tsurtsumiya applied to VGIK film school and was rejected. She used her father's connections to work as an editor at Gorky Studio until she could apply again. After a year she was accepted and studied with the science fiction director A.M. Zguridi. At 19, she was the youngest student in her class of eight and said of the experience, "they treated me like a child." After graduating in 1987 Tsurtsumiya again worked at Gorky Studio for a time before branching out into independent cinema.

Tsurtsumiya's ethnic background is a mix of Belarusian, Polish, and Georgian heritage. She says her blended lineage impacts the kinds of stories she chooses to tell through her filmmaking. In an interview she noted, "I'm really not able to say what nationality I am" and that this made her want to "make films which unite people."

== Career ==
Marina Tsurtsumiya dabbled in political advertising, directing videos for the Russian branch of Greenpeace, and in 1986 directed commercials for Boris Yeltsin's presidential campaign. She also worked for two years as Artistic Director of the advertising agency Art Kraft. She also worked for various charitable organizations and also curated art exhibitions, including the first to show people with developmental disabilities at Russia's Contemporary Art Centre Winzavod. She now owns Tsurtsum Cafe in Moscow located in the Winzavod Centre.

Tsurtsumiya made a number of documentaries that explored various topics related to the history of Russia's capital including Moscow Military and Stronger than Death is Love, a film about Moscow's first hospice. She also collaborated with director Lev Kulidzhanov on a series of historical films about the 21st century titled Recollection of Something.

Tsurtsumiya struggled with the shift in the film industry during the perestroika period. The film production model changed from government supported films in line with state ideology to an industry that promoted films that made a profit. Tsurtsumiya lamented in a 1992 interview, “Now we have new possibilities, but also a new complication--the notion that profit can be made from art. We are in big danger of commercialization." She added in a different interview, "I don’t shoot very difficult films, but they’re not commercial pictures.”

In a 2009 interview, Russian art-house distributor Raisa Fomina commented on Marina Tsurtsumiya's move away from cinema and into the restaurant business. He said, using Tsurtsumiya as an example, "Seeing that the audience is inert, that their work is not interesting to anyone, that it is useless to wait for support from the state, some talented people leave the profession, start doing something else."

== Only Death Comes for Sure ==
Tsurtsumiya's first feature film, Only Death Comes for Sure, was completed in 1993. The dramatic film is based on the Gabriel Garcia Marquez story, “No One Writes to the Colonel”, but the setting is changed from Colombia to war-torn Georgia. Despite playing at several international film festivals, Only Death Comes for Sure was not offered a distribution deal in Russia.

National Film Award winning critic Rashmi Doraiswamy praised Tsurtsumiya's film, "The desolation of a strife-torn city, of the aged couple waiting for decades for their pension papers to be cleared as history changes tracks rapidly, and the youth who live both in and out of the political situation they are in ... all are captured sensitively in the visual, in the sound-track and in the pacing by the director."

== Filmography ==
Year	Title	Run time	Notes
1983	Visiting	10 min.	
1987	Recollection of Something	30 min.	
1989	Architect Konstantin Melnikov	40 min.	Documentary film
1990	Spain: The Light and Shadows of the Republic	70 min.	Documentary film
1990	Dominus	70 min.	
1993	Only Death Comes for Sure	135 min.	Feature film
1995	Moscow Military	26 min.	Documentary film
1997	Closer to the Sky	13 min.	Documentary film
1999	Stronger than Death is Love	16 min.	Documentary film
2004	The Formula of the Wall	26 min.	Documentary film
2005	The Road to Stalingrad	26 min.	
2007	Where do the Children Come From?	90 min.	Feature film
