= Woman of the Port (1991 film) =

1991 film

- Directed by: Arturo Ripstein
- Written by: Guy de Maupassant; Paz Alicia Garciadiego
- Produced by: Michael Donnelly; Allen Persselin
- Starring: Damián Alcázar
- Cinematography: Ángel Goded
- Edited by: Carlos Puente
- Release date: 11 September 1991
- Running time: 110 minutes
- Country: Mexico
- Language: Spanish

Woman of the Port (Spanish: La mujer del puerto) is a 1991 Mexican drama film directed by Arturo Ripstein. It was screened in the Un Certain Regard section at the 1991 Cannes Film Festival.

== Cast ==
- Damián Alcázar as Marro
- Alejandro Parodi as Carmelo
- Juan Pastor as Simón
- Patricia Reyes Spíndola as Tomasa
- Evangelina Sosa as Perla
- Ernesto Yáñez as Eneas
