= Love Lies (1989 film) =

1989 film

- Directed by: Arturo Ripstein
- Written by: Paz Alicia Garciadiego
- Produced by: Tita Lombardo
- Starring: Delia Casanova
- Cinematography: Ángel Goded
- Release date: July 1989
- Running time: 111 minutes
- Country: Mexico
- Language: Spanish

Love Lies (Spanish: Mentiras piadosas) is a 1989 Mexican drama film directed by Arturo Ripstein. It was entered into the 16th Moscow International Film Festival.

== Cast ==
- Delia Casanova as Clara Zamudio
- Alonso Echánove as Israel Ordóñez
- Luisa Huertas as Pilar
- Guillermo Iván
- Fernando Palavicini as Ramiro
- Ernesto Yáñez as Matilde
