= Borderland (2007 film) =

2007 horror film

- Promotional film poster
- Directed by: Zev Berman
- Written by: Zev Berman
- Produced by: Deborah Davis; Randall Emmett
- Starring: Brian Presley; Jake Muxworthy; Rider Strong; Damián Alcázar; Sean Astin; Martha Higareda; Francesca Guillén; Beto Cuevas
- Production company: Emmett/Furla Films
- Distributed by: After Dark Films; Lionsgate
- Release date: March 11, 2007 (South by Southwest Film Festival)
- Running time: 114 minutes
- Country: United States/Mexico
- Language: English

Borderland is a 2007 horror film written and directed by Zev Berman. It is loosely based on the true story of Adolfo de Jesús Constanzo, a drug lord and the leader of a religious cult that practiced human sacrifice. Constanzo and his followers, called the Narco-satanists, kidnapped and murdered The University of Texas junior Mark J. Kilroy in the spring of 1989. Marco Bacuzzi's final role of the film before his death on June 6, 2017.

== Plot ==
The film begins with Mexico City policemen banging on the door of what seems to be an abandoned house. Ulises and his partner enter the house and find magical sigils with gruesome remnants of animal and human sacrifice. The two are ambushed by the occupants, and Ulises is forced to watch them cut out his partner’s eyes and decapitate him. Ulises is shot in the leg and is allowed to live to warn other law enforcement officials to stay out of their way.

One year later, Ed, Henry, and Phil, three recent Texas grads, are enjoying a beach bonfire in Galveston. They decide to head down to Mexico for the week to hit up the strip clubs and take advantage of a lack of law enforcement.

Ed meets a bartender named Valeria after being stabbed defending her in a barfight and falls in love with her, while Henry sets Phil up for his first sexual encounter with a young prostitute. Phil, being a pastor’s son, is reluctant to have sex when he sees a shrine to Jesus Christ on the wall. He becomes infatuated with the prostitute, who he quickly finds out has a baby. The boys, Valeria, and her cousin Lupe indulge in some hallucinogenic mushrooms before going to a carnival. Phil, uninhibited by the drugs, angers a carnival-goer by impatiently pestering him to finish in the outhouse. The man turns out to be the same one who brutally tortured Ulises’ partner. Phil leaves early to give the prostitute's baby a teddy bear, and as he walks from the carnival alone, he is approached and offered a ride home. Phil reluctantly gets into a car driven by the same man he had aggravated earlier. The men proceed to abduct him when he tries to leave.

The next morning, Henry and Ed notice that Phil did not come back, and the two begin to investigate. They find the local authorities and the townspeople utterly terrified of Phil's captors, and eventually team up with Ulises, who informs them of a human sacrifice cult holding a young man fitting Phil’s description captive. Henry gets shot after threatening the occupants of a suspicious-looking truck with a crowbar and is given a crucifix for protection by the doctor when he mentions the cult. Phil is revealed to be kept in a shack on a ranch under the watch of Randall, an American serial killer affiliated with the cult. Randall explains that they follow "some African voodoo" called Palo Mayombe and are preparing a human sacrifice. The sacrifices are supposed to add power to a Nganga, a cauldron of mutilated remains that contains spirits of the dead, in order for their drugs to be rendered invisible to the border guards while smuggling them into the US.

Henry is later hacked to death by several men with machetes on the roof of their hotel, and Ed and Valeria decide to go with Ulises to kill the men who abducted Phil. Meanwhile, Phil is prepared for the sacrifice, being told he was chosen for his softness so that he would provide the required screams of agony. He is tortured by the charismatic and sadistic leader Santillán, having his collarbone chopped in half with a butcher knife. Phil shows resolve and prays Psalm 23 while Santillán desperately invokes the god Chango to accept his victim. Seeing his torture rendered ineffective at producing the helpless cries of pure suffering he desired, he bites out Phil’s tongue to stop his prayer. By then, it is too late to save Phil, who is decapitated for the Nganga, but Ulises passes through unhindered and executes an unarmed and dumbfounded Santillán.

Ed, Valeria, and Ulises travel down the road to a house inhabited by an old man, where Ulises bleeds to death. Randall and the other cult members followed Ed and Valeria to the house, in complete shock at the death of their leader, whom they refer to as a god. The two risk their lives to kill the remaining members, eventually deciding to swim across the nearby border of the Rio Grande.

The movie ends with a caption explaining that several kilos of cocaine were found in containers along with human hair, over 50 bodies were exhumed from a mass grave at the ranch, Ed and Valeria were questioned after being caught swimming across the river, and several suspects remain at large.

== Cast ==
- Brian Presley as Ed
- Rider Strong as Phil
- Jake Muxworthy as Henry
- Beto Cuevas as Santillan
- Martha Higareda as Valeria
- Sean Astin as Randall
- Mircea Monroe as Nancy
- Damián Alcázar as Ulises
- Marco Bacuzzi as Gustavo
- Roberto Sosa as Luis
- José María Yazpik as Zoilo
- Humberto Busto as Mario
- Elizabeth Cervantes as Anna
- Francesca Guillén as Lupe
- Alenka Rios as Amelia

== Release ==
The film was selected as one of the "8 Films to Die For" at the After Dark Horrorfest 2007.

== Reception ==
Film review aggregator Rotten Tomatoes reported an approval rating of 88%, based on 8 reviews, with a rating average of 6.8/10.

Chloe Pacey from Dread Central gave the film a score of 4/5, commending the film's performances, "realistic" characters, and washed-out, near overexposed look. Scott Collura from IGN commended the film's realistic feel writing, "every once in awhile, a film can defy expectations, and Lionsgate's Borderland is one such case."
