= No One Writes to the Colonel (film) =

- Directed by: Arturo Ripstein
- Written by: Paz Alicia Garciadiego; Gabriel García Márquez
- Produced by: Gabriel Ripstein
- Starring: Fernando Luján
- Cinematography: Guillermo Granillo
- Edited by: Fernando Pardo
- Music by: David Mansfield
- Production companies: Canal+ Ventanarosa; Amaranta Films; DMVB Films; Televisión Española
- Distributed by: Alta Films
- Release date: 2 June 1999
- Running time: 118 minutes
- Countries: Mexico; Spain; France
- Language: Spanish

No One Writes to the Colonel (Spanish: El coronel no tiene quien le escriba) is a 1999 Spanish-language film directed by Arturo Ripstein. It was an international co-production between France, Spain and Mexico. It is based on the eponymous novella by Colombian author and Nobel Prize winner Gabriel García Márquez. The film was also selected as the Mexican entry for the Best Foreign Language Oscar at the 72nd Academy Awards, but it did not make the final shortlist.

== Cast ==
- Fernando Luján - El coronel
- Marisa Paredes - Lola
- Salma Hayek - Julia
- Rafael Inclán - Padre Ángel
- Ernesto Yáñez - Don Sabas
- Daniel Giménez Cacho - Nogales
- Esteban Soberanes - Germán
- Patricia Reyes Spíndola - Jacinta
- Odiseo Bichir - Dr. Pardo
- Julián Pastor - Lugones
- Eugenio Lobo - Álvaro

== Production ==
The production of the film was somewhat of a family affair, with Arturo Ripstein directing, his wife Paz Alicia Garciadiego writing the screenplay, and their son Gabriel Ripstein making his debut as producer.

== Awards ==
The film was Mexico's official Best Foreign Language Film submission at the 72nd Academy Awards, but did not manage to receive a nomination. It was also entered into the 1999 Cannes Film Festival.

== See also ==
- List of submissions to the 72nd Academy Awards for Best Foreign Language Film
- List of Mexican submissions for the Academy Award for Best Foreign Language Film
