= Regina Orozco =

Mexican actress and singer

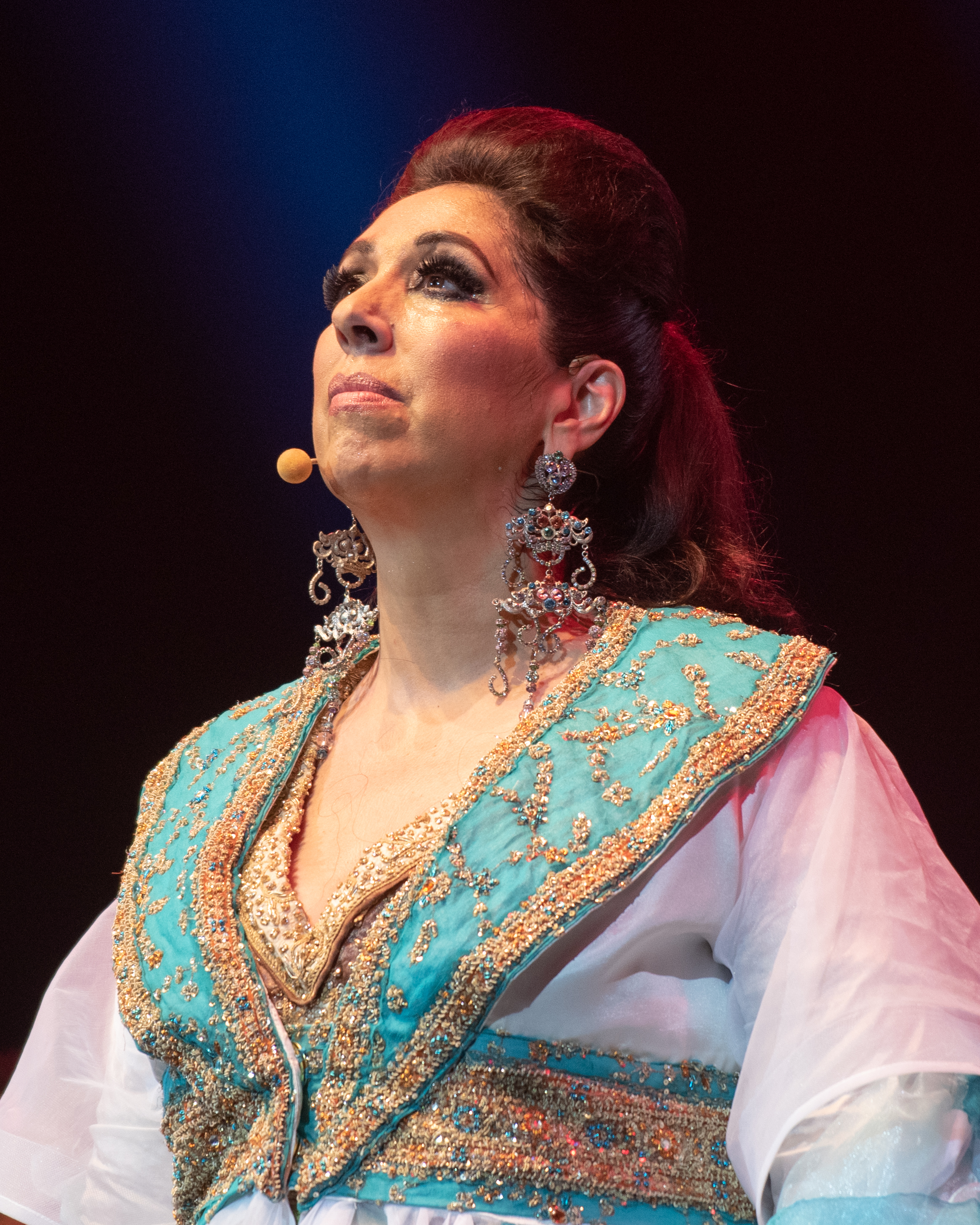
- Orozco in 2022
- Born: 18 February 1964 (age 61); Mexico City, Mexico
- Occupation: Actress
- Years active: 1991–present

Regina Orozco (born 18 February 1964; Mexico City, Mexico) is a Mexican actress and singer, best known for her roles in Mexican films. Orozco won an Ariel Award for Best Actress for her performance in the film Profundo Carmesí (1996). Subsequently, she was nominated at the Venice International Film Festival for Best Actress for her performance in Profundo Carmesí. In March 2013, she won the Medal of Merit in Artistic Interpretation, awarded by the Legislative Assembly of the Federal District by the VI Legislature.

== Filmography ==
=== Film roles ===
Year	Title	Roles	Notes
1991	Sólo con tu pareja	Mrs. Dolores	
1992	Objetos perdidos	Alicia Villalobos	Short film
1993	Dama de noche	Salomé	
1993	La vida conyugal	Waitress	
1994	Mujeres insumisas	Chayo	
1996	El amor de tu vida S.A.	Gloria	
1996	Profundo Carmesí	Coral Fabre	
1996	De tripas, corazón	Denise	Short film
1996	Cosi fan tutte	Fiordiligi	
1997	Perdita Durango	Lilly	
1999	Santitos	Vicenta Cortés	
2003	Zurdo	Mrs. Mendoza	
2004	Amor en silencio	Ana Francisca	
2006	Los pajarracos	La Nana	
2006	Efectos secundarios	Lorena	
2007	Entre caníbales	Carmen	
2009	Crónicas chilangas	Claudia	
2009	Paradas contínuas	Tia Roz	
2009	Nikté	Ij' Aesu	
2010	No eres tú, soy yo	Indra	
2012	Vacaciones en el infierno	Mrs. Serrano	
2012	El Santos vs. La Tetona Mendoza	La Tetona Mendoza	Voice role
2014	Qué le dijiste a Dios?	Santa	
2017	Ana y Bruno	Rosy / Plañidera 2	Voice role
2018	El viaje de Keta	Reina de los cupcakes	
2022	Valentino, Be Your Own Hero Or Villain	Luisa Acosta	

=== Television roles ===
Year	Title	Roles	Notes
1998	La casa del naranjo	Narcisa Olmedo	3 episodes
1999	Cuentos para solitarios	Voice-over	Episode: "La mala hora de Ramón"
2001	Lo que callamos las mujeres	Rosa	Episodes: "Esa otra que soy yo" and "La Lola enamorada"
2017	Su nombre era Dolores, la Jenn que yo conocí	Elena	Recurring role; 8 episodes
2017–2018	Mi marido tiene familia	Amalia	Recurring role (seasons 1–2); 171 episodes
2019	The House of Flowers	Rosita's mother	3 episodes
2019	Los pecados de Bárbara	Lola	Main role
2021-	Acapulco	Lupe	Recurring role; 13 episodes

== Personal life ==
Orozco is openly pansexual.
