= Welcome to Acapulco =

- Film poster
- Directed by: Guillermo Iván
- Written by: Garry Charles; Robert Benjamin
- Story by: Loris Curci; Magarditch Halvadjian
- Produced by: Loris Curci; Guillermo Iván
- Starring: Michael Kingsbaker; Ana Serradilla; Michael Madsen; Paul Sorvino; William Baldwin; Bradley Gregg; Jeannine Kaspar; Michael Papajohn
- Cinematography: Saro Varjabedian
- Edited by: Robert Benjamin; Sébastien de Sainte Croix
- Music by: Javier Bayon; Luc Suarez
- Production companies: Open Frames; Golden Ceiba Productions; Global Group
- Distributed by: Entertainment One
- Release date: 25 October 2019
- Running time: 88 minutes
- Country: Mexico
- Languages: Spanish; English

Welcome to Acapulco is a 2019 Mexican action comedy thriller film directed by Guillermo Iván, and starring Michael Kingsbaker, Ana Serradilla, Michael Madsen, Paul Sorvino, William Baldwin, Bradley Gregg, Jeannine Kaspar and Michael Papajohn.

== Plot ==
Matt Booth (played by Michael Kingsbaker) is a video game designer who dreams of creating a successful game that will make him a household name in the gaming industry. However, his efforts have been met with disappointment and little recognition. Matt Booth has one shot to save his career by unveiling his biggest project yet at the Video Game Awards in New Mexico. Matt's plans go awry when he encounters an old friend at the airport just before his flight. They indulge in heavy drinking, and as a result, Matt boards the wrong plane. Instead of arriving in New Mexico, Matt finds himself in Acapulco, Mexico. Upon landing, he quickly realizes his mistake but is unable to rectify it. He finds himself on the run from high-powered criminals, deadly hitmen and the Feds, all looking for a mysterious package that he has allegedly smuggled through customs yet knows nothing about. During the event, Matt encounters the beautiful and mysterious femme fatale named Anna (played by Ana Serradilla). Unbeknownst to him, Anna is a spy on a dangerous mission involving stolen top-secret technology. In the midst of chaos at the convention, Matt gets entangled in a whirlwind of events that leads to him being mistakenly believed to possess the stolen technology.

Suddenly, Matt finds himself in a mind-bending twist as he is somehow transported into the virtual world of his own video game. Matt has to become a real-life version of the video-game characters he designs to evade an awkward situation he's put himself in after a wild night. In this immersive and action-packed virtual reality, he must navigate through various challenges and obstacles while trying to prove his innocence and unravel the conspiracy behind the stolen technology. As the lines between reality and the game blur, Matt must rely on his wit, creativity, and newfound virtual abilities to outsmart the game's challenges, survive the real-world threats, and clear his name. Along the way, he forms an unlikely alliance with Anna, who is initially suspicious of his intentions but eventually becomes an ally in his quest. Matt and Adriana confront the masterminds behind the conspiracy.

Matt is in the midst of launching his new video game and needs to impress publishers at a meeting in New Mexico to secure a deal. However, after a night of heavy drinking at an airport bar, Matt wakes up on a plane and realizes he's in Acapulco, Mexico. Confused and hungover, Matt's attempts to get back to New Mexico are derailed when he becomes entangled in a web of violence and espionage. He finds himself pursued by various parties, including the Feds, the C.I.A., mercenaries, and more. It turns out that Matt unknowingly brought a package into the country that these groups are after. As Matt navigates the dangerous situation he's in, he crosses paths with a mysterious and capable woman named Adriana. She seems to have her own agenda and becomes an integral part of Matt's journey to survive and unravel the mysteries surrounding the package. Throughout the movie, there are various action sequences filled with gunfire, explosions, and chase scenes. The film blends elements of video game imagery, as Matt's perspective is sometimes presented with game-like visual effects, including health bars and attack names. However, despite the action-packed premise, the movie suffers from several shortcomings. The character of Matt often breaks the fourth wall with his commentary, which can interrupt the flow of the action and become repetitive. Additionally, the treatment of female characters in the film has been criticized. Adriana, while a capable character, is sometimes reduced to a protector/love interest role, and other female characters are used in exploitative ways for shock value. As the story progresses, it becomes clear that there is more to the package and the people pursuing it than meets the eye. Characters like Raphael (portrayed by director Iván), bring some entertaining moments to the film. In the end, it is a mix of action, comedy, and intrigue. The film's potential is somewhat hindered by its reliance on certain tropes and its treatment of female characters. While there are enjoyable elements, such as the action sequences and the central mystery, the movie's execution falls short of its potential.

As Matt navigates the chaotic world of Acapulco, he continues to find himself in increasingly bizarre and dangerous situations. Anna, the mysterious femme fatale, becomes his reluctant ally as they both try to evade the various factions chasing them. The stolen technology, it turns out, is a powerful prototype of a mind-controlling device that can manipulate reality within the virtual world, and its potential for harm is immense. Matt's journey takes him through a series of action-packed sequences where he harnesses his video game design skills to manipulate the virtual world, fighting off enemies and solving puzzles. Meanwhile, in the real world, Matt's friends and associates, including his gaming industry peers, are worried about his disappearance and launch their own investigation. As Matt and Anna dig deeper into the conspiracy, they discover that the mastermind behind the theft of the mind-controlling device is none other than Matt's old friend, who he encountered at the airport before the fateful flight. It turns out that his friend had been working with a criminal organization to steal the technology for their own nefarious purposes. Matt and Anna manage to infiltrate the villain's lair, a high-tech facility hidden within Acapulco, and confront the criminals responsible for the chaos. A climactic battle ensues, combining elements of both the virtual and real worlds. Matt uses his newfound virtual abilities to create imaginative traps and strategies, while Anna showcases her spy skills and combat prowess. In a tense showdown, Matt faces off against his old friend, who is now consumed by greed and power. With the help of Anna and his ingenuity, Matt manages to defeat his friend and disable the mind-controlling device, preventing it from falling into the wrong hands. The movie concludes with Matt and Anna emerging victorious, having thwarted the criminal organization's plans. The virtual world seamlessly merges with reality, and they return to the real Acapulco. Despite the chaos and danger, Matt's adventure has given him a new sense of confidence and inspiration. He decides to channel his experiences into his video game designs, incorporating elements from his wild journey. As the story ends, Matt's innovative game becomes a massive hit at the Video Game Awards, fulfilling his dreams of success in the gaming industry. He also forms a genuine bond with Anna, and while their paths may diverge, their connection remains strong. The movie closes with a sense of triumph, as Matt's life has been forever changed by his unexpected and exhilarating escapade in "Welcome to Acapulco."

== Cast ==
- Ana Serradilla as Adriana Vazquez
- Michael Kingsbaker as Mathew Booth
- Michael Madsen as Hyde
- Paul Sorvino as Senator Campbell
- William Baldwin as Drake Savage
- Bradley Gregg as Anthony
- Jeannine Kaspar as Miss Ryker
- Michael Papajohn as "Apex"
- Guillermo Iván as Raphael
