= Bleak Street =

2015 film

- Theatrical release poster
- Directed by: Arturo Ripstein
- Written by: Paz Alicia Garciadiego
- Produced by: Xanat Briceño; Luis Alberto Estrada; Luis Alberto Estrada; José María Morales; Walter Navas; Arturo Ripstein; Marco Antonio Salgado; Alan Serna
- Starring: Alberto Estrella
- Cinematography: Alejandro Cantú
- Edited by: Carlos Puente; Arturo Ripstein
- Production companies: Productora 35; Wanda Visión; Equipment Film Design; Cinema Maquina; Alebrije Cine y Video
- Release date: 15 September 2015 (TIFF)
- Running time: 99 minutes
- Countries: Mexico; Spain
- Language: Spanish

Bleak Street (Spanish: La calle de la amargura) is a 2015 Mexican-Spanish crime drama film directed by Arturo Ripstein. It was shown in the Masters section of the 2015 Toronto International Film Festival.

== Cast ==
- Alberto Estrella
- Silvia Pasquel
- Arcelia Ramirez
- Patricia Reyes Spíndola
- Leticia Gomez Rivera

== Reception ==
It has a score of 63% on Metacritic.
