= Julián Pastor =

Mexican actor (1943–2015)

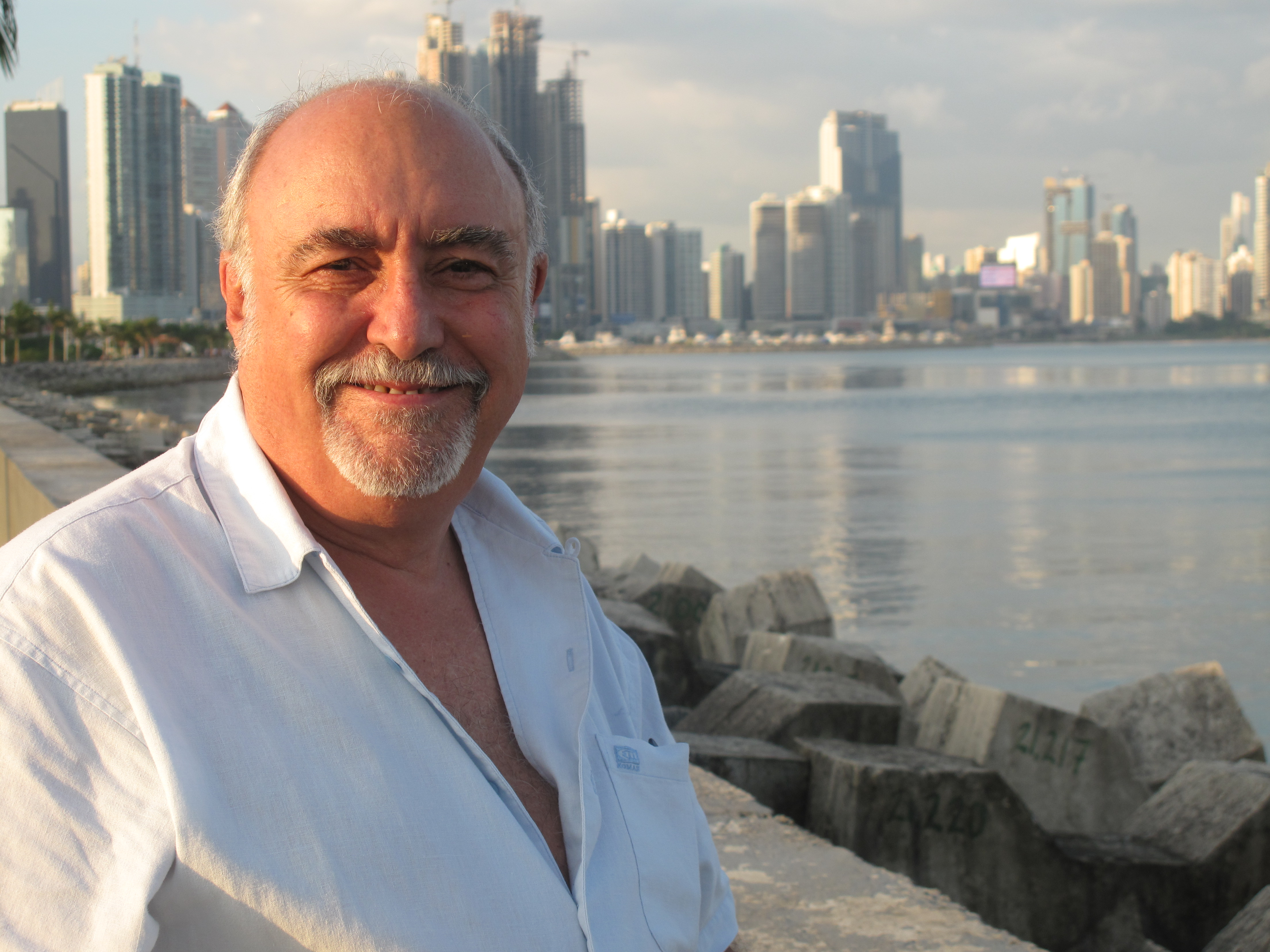
- Born: 18 October 1943; Mexico City, Mexico
- Died: 24 August 2015 (aged 71); Mexico City, Mexico
- Occupations: Actor; Film director
- Years active: 1965–2014

Julián Pastor (18 October 1943 – 24 August 2015) was a Mexican actor and film director. He appeared in more than sixty films from 1973 to 2008.

== Filmography ==
Actor
Year	Title	Role	Notes
1965	En este pueblo no hay ladrones	Dámaso	
1966	Sólo para tí	Carlos González	
1967	La muerte es puntual	Antonio	
1967	Arrullo de Dios	Ramón	
1967	El mundo loco de los jóvenes		
1967	The Adolescents	Ramón	
1968	Ensayo de una noche de bodas		
1968	Muchachas, muchachas, muchachas		
1969	Lauro Puñales	Carlos Reyes	
1969	Santa		
1969	Los recuerdos del porvenir	Nicolás Moncada (Nico)	
1969	Primera comunión		
1969	Patsy, mi amor	Freddy	
1969	Las impuras		
1969	Almohada para tres	Luis Galván	
1970	Una señora estupenda	Juan	
1970	Tres noches de locura	Alfredo	(segment "Lucía")
1970	Matrimonio y sexo		
1970	Flor de durazno	Miguel	
1970	La viuda blanca	Gustavo Castelar	
1971	Siempre hay una primera vez	Enrique	(segment "Gloria")
1971	Para servir a usted		
1971	El juicio de los hijos	Carlos	
1971	Las reglas del juego		
1972	The Garden of Aunt Isabel		
1972	Los perturbados		(segment "La Obsesión")
1972	Los ángeles de la tarde		
1973	Those Years	Jesús González Ortega	
1973	El hombre y la bestia	Inspector Blanco	
1974	Crónica de un amor	Julián	
1975	Peregrina		
1975	Un amor extraño	Víctor Estévez	
1975	Blacker Than the Night	Pedro	
1975	Letters from Marusia	Weber	
1976	La palomilla al rescate		Uncredited
1977	Maten al león	Paco Ridruejo	
1977	Vacaciones misteriosas	Conde Vivaldi	
1978	The Place Without Limits	Octavio	
1979	Cadena perpetua		
1979	Adriana del Rio, actriz		
1986	La Gran Fiesta	Don Antonio Jiménez	
1987	Herencia maldita		
1988	Camino largo a Tijuana	Dealer	
1990	Revenge	Quinones	
1990	La sombra del ciprés es alargada		
1991	Mujer de cabaret		
1991	Bandidos	Militar	
1992	Cómodas mensualidades		
1992	La tarea prohibida	Antonio / María's husband	
1992	Polvora en la piel		
1993	Fray Bartolomé de las Casas	Gobernador	
1993	Kino	Padre Salvatierra	
1993	Extraños caminos		
1993	The Beginning and the End	Luján	
1994	Juana la Cubana		
1996	Tres minutos en la oscuridad		
1997	Un baúl lleno de miedo	Esteban Estévez	
1999	No One Writes to the Colonel	Lugones	
1999	En un claroscuro de la luna	finquero II	
2006	The Virgin of Lust	Don Lázaro	
2008	Arráncame la vida	General de Arresto	
2010	El efecto tequila	Raymundo	
2012	La vida precoz y breve de Sabina Rivas	Amigo en la fiesta de Cossío	
2014	Familia Gang	Chico	(final film role)

Director
Year	Title	Notes
1975	La venida del Rey Olmos	
1977	The Divine Caste	
