= Acapulco (2021 TV series) =

American comedy television series

- Promotional poster
- Genre: Comedy
- Created by: Austin Winsberg; Eduardo Cisneros; Jason Shuman
- Inspired by: How to Be a Latin Lover
- Starring: Eugenio Derbez; Enrique Arrizon; Damián Alcázar; Jessica Collins; Fernando Carsa; Vanessa Bauche; Regina Orozco; Gala Montes de Oca; Camila Perez; Chord Overstreet; Regina Reynoso; Carlos Corona; Rafael Cebrián; Raphael Alejandro; Will Sasso; Vico Escorcia; Carolina Moreno; Cristo Fernández; Lobo Elias; Rossana de Leon; Rodrigo Urquidi; Ramón Álvarez
- Narrated by: Eugenio Derbez
- Country of origin: United States
- Original languages: Spanish; English
- No. of seasons: 4
- No. of episodes: 40

Production
- Executive producers: Eugenio Derbez; Austin Winsberg; Chris Harris; Sam Laybourne; Benjamin Odell; Sonia Almanza Gambaro; Eric Tannenbaum; Kim Tannenbaum; Jason Wang; Eduardo Cisneros; Jason Shuman; Jay Karas; Paul Presburger; Richard Shepard
- Production location: Mexico
- Cinematography: Eduardo Enrique Mayén Grant Smith
- Animators: Boxel Studios; AB Studios
- Editors: David Dean; John Smithee
- Running time: 30 minutes
- Production companies: Lionsgate Television; Zihuatanejo Productions; The Tannenbaum Company; 3Pas Studios

Original release
- Network: Apple TV+
- Release: October 8, 2021 – September 17, 2025

Acapulco is an American comedy television series created by Austin Winsberg, Eduardo Cisneros, and Jason Shuman, inspired by How to Be a Latin Lover (2017). The series premiered on Apple TV+ on October 8, 2021. In March 2022, the series was renewed for a second season, which premiered on October 21, 2022. In January 2023, the series was renewed for a third season, which premiered on May 1, 2024. In August 2024, the series was renewed for a fourth and final season, which premiered on July 23, 2025.

== Cast ==
=== Main ===
- Eugenio Derbez as Maximo Gallardo Ramos, a successful mogul living in Malibu who has a rags to riches story (present day)
  - Enrique Arrizon as Maximo Gallardo Ramos, a working-class young man who has dreamed of working at Las Colinas Resort and works as a pool boy (1984)
  - Erick Saldaña as Young Maximo Gallardo Ramos (1974)
- Fernando Carsa as Guillermo (Memo), a working-class young man and best friend of Maximo who works in laundry at Las Colinas Resort (1984)
  - Carsa also plays Memo's son in the present day.
  - Hemky Madera as an older version of Memo in the present day.
- Damián Alcázar as Don Pablo Bonilla, Head of Operations at Las Colinas Resort who Maximo idolises since he also has a rags to riches story, he also becomes a mentor of Maximo and Memo. He is the father of Victor, ex-husband of Carmen and grandfather of Mariano (1984)
  - Daniel Fuentes Lobo plays a younger version of Don Pablo (known just as Pablo) (1949)
  - Alcázar also plays the 1964, 1967 and 1981 versions of Don Pablo.
- Camila Perez as Julia Gonzalez, a receptionist at Las Colinas Resort, girlfriend of Chad and potential love interest of Maximo (1984)
  - Perez also plays the 1981 version of Julia.
  - Carolina Gómez plays older Julia (present day)
- Chord Overstreet as Chad Davies, a General Manager at Las Colinas Resort, boyfriend of Julia and son of Diane (1984)
  - Overstreet also plays the 1981 version of Chad.
- Vanessa Bauche as Nora Gallardo Ramos, the widowed mother of Maximo and Sara who works as a cleaner, potential love interest of Emilio and Esteban and future abuela of Hugo (1984)
  - Bauche also plays the 1964, 1967, 1974 and the older present day version of Nora Ramos.
  - Gala Komori as Nora Ramos (1949)
- Regina Reynoso as Sara Gallardo Ramos, Maximo's sister and future mother of Hugo (1984)
  - Bianca Marroquín as Older Sara Gallardo Ramos, sister of Maximo and mother of Hugo (present day)
- Raphael Alejandro as Hugo, nephew of Maximo and future son of Sara (present day)
- Jessica Collins as Diane Davies, current owner of Las Colinas Resort, former soap opera actress, author, fitness guru and entrepreneur and mother of Chad (1984)
  - Collins also plays the 1967 and 1981 versions of Diane
- Rafael Cebrián as Hector Valero, head pool boy at Las Colinas Resort who is cocky but knows how to fleece the guests (1984)
- Carlos Corona as Esteban, a handy-man resident who lives at the same place the Gallardo Ramos's live and potential love interest of Nora (1984)

NOTE

- Unless otherwise stated, most characters in the show are set in 1984 Acapulco, Mexico

=== Recurring ===
- Will Sasso plays Joe, present day's Maximo's driver and bodyguard
- Regina Orozco as Lupe, head of laundry at Las Colinas Resort (1984)
  - Carolina Moreno plays young Lupe (1949)
- Carolina Moreno as Lorena
  - Regina Orozco plays older Lorena (present day)
- Lobo Elias as Beto, a bartender at Las Colinas Resort (1984)
  - Elias also plays the 1981 version of Beto
- Julian Sedgwick as Rolf, Maximo's butler in Malibu (present day)
- Rodrigo Urquidi as Augusto, one of Las Colinas Resort's poolside singers (1984)
- Rossana de Leon as Adriana, one of Las Colinas Resort's poolside singers (1984)
- Ricardo Cañamar as Javier
- Sofia Ruiz as Monica
  - Ruiz also plays the 1981 version of Monica.
- Erick Zavala as Emilio, owner of a record store and potential love interest of Nora (1984)
- Marco Terán as Eduardo
- Jessica Balsaneli as Sestina
- Eliana Jones as Becca Rosenthal, Maximo's first "wife" whom he met and had a fling with at Las Colinas Resort, who was vacationing with her parents from New York (1984)
- Samantha Orozco as Gabriela (5 episodes)
- Gala Montes as Aida (Sara’s love interest)

=== Guest stars ===
- Sally Pressman as Mrs. Bennett, a guest as Las Colinas Resort who take a shining to Maximo and friend of Diane (1984) ("Pilot")
- Steve Monroe as Mr. Bennett, a guest as Las Colinas Resort who take a shining to Maximo and friend of Diane (1984) ("Pilot")
- Caleb Foote as Jessie, a guest as Las Colinas Resort who Maximo helps (1984) ("Jessie's Girl")
- Simon Templeman as Bronte de Fils, a guest at Las Colinas Resort a fashion designer and owner of a modelling agency and friend of Diane (1984) ("Invisible Touch")
- Juan Pablo Espinosa as Rodolfo, a singing superstar and guest at Las Colinas Resort (1984) ("Crazy Little Thing Called Love")
- Jeff Meacham as David, Rodolfo's manager and guest at Las Colinas Resort (1984) ("Crazy Little Thing Called Love")
- Gillian Vigman as Marcia Rosenthal, a rich New Yorker vacationing at Las Colinas Resort with her husband Barry and daughter Becca. ("Uptown Girl")
- Kevin Kilner as Barry Rosenthal, a rich New Yorker vacationing at Las Colinas Resort with her wife Marcia and daughter Becca. ("Uptown Girl")
- Alizée Gaillard as Yvonne, co-owner of Las Colinas Resort (1949) ("Time After Time")
- Marco Zunino as Don Antonio, Head of Operations at Las Colinas Resort (1949) ("Time After Time")
- Jaime Camil as Alejandro Vera, Co-Owner of the Las Colinas Resort ("Just the Two of Us")

== Episodes ==
=== Series overview ===
| Season | Episodes | Originally released | |
| Season | Episodes | First released | Last released |
|---|---|---|---|
| 1 | 10 | October 8, 2021 | December 3, 2021 |
| 2 | 10 | October 21, 2022 | December 16, 2022 |
| 3 | 10 | May 1, 2024 | June 26, 2024 |
| 4 | 10 | July 23, 2025 | September 17, 2025 |

=== Season 1 (2021) ===
| No. overall | No. in season | Title | Directed by | Written by | Original release date |
|---|---|---|---|---|---|
| 1 | 1 | "Pilot" | Richard Shepard | Austin Winsberg and Eduardo Cisneros & Jason Shuman | October 8, 2021 |
| 2 | 2 | "Jessie's Girl" | Jay Karas | Michael Lisbe & Nate Reger | October 8, 2021 |
| 3 | 3 | "Invisible Touch" | Jay Karas | Michael Colton & John Aboud | October 15, 2021 |
| 4 | 4 | "Crazy Little Thing Called Love" | Roberto Sneider | Becky Mann & Audra Sielaff | October 22, 2021 |
| 5 | 5 | "All Night Long" | Roberto Sneider | Mara Vargas Jackson | October 29, 2021 |
| 6 | 6 | "Uptown Girl" | Dean Holland | Eduardo Cisneros & Jason Shuman | November 5, 2021 |
| 7 | 7 | "For Your Eyes Only" | Jay Karas | Tamara Yajia | November 12, 2021 |
| 8 | 8 | "Time After Time" | Jay Karas | Eddie Quintana | November 19, 2021 |
| 9 | 9 | "The Most Wonderful Time of the Year" | Tristram Shapeero | Joe Cristalli | November 25, 2021 |
| 10 | 10 | "You Should Hear How She Talks About You" | Tristram Shapeero | Chris Harris | December 3, 2021 |

=== Season 2 (2022) ===
| No. overall | No. in season | Title | Directed by | Written by | Original release date |
|---|---|---|---|---|---|
| 11 | 1 | "Break My Stride" | Jay Karas | Austin Winsberg | October 21, 2022 |
| 12 | 2 | "Hit Me With Your Best Shot" | Jay Karas | Jonathan Green & Gabe Miller | October 21, 2022 |
| 13 | 3 | "Glory Days" | Nicole Treston Abranian | Joe Cristalli | October 28, 2022 |
| 14 | 4 | "Love Is A Battlefield" | Nicole Treston Abranian | Tamara Yajia | November 4, 2022 |
| 15 | 5 | "We Don’t Need Another Hero" | Victor Nelli, Jr. | Mara Vargas Jackson | November 11, 2022 |
| 16 | 6 | "Hollywood Nights" | Jay Karas | Eduardo Cisneros & Jason Shuman | November 18, 2022 |
| 17 | 7 | "Always Something There to Remind Me" | Victor Nelli, Jr. | Eddie Quintana | November 23, 2022 |
| 18 | 8 | "Money Changes Everything" | Victor Nelli Jr. | Ilse Apellaniz | December 2, 2022 |
| 19 | 9 | "The Power of Love" | Jay Karas | Maggie Feakins, Nico Correia and Carla Olivia Torres | December 9, 2022 |
| 20 | 10 | "Against All Odds" | Victor Nelli Jr. | Chris Harris | December 16, 2022 |

=== Season 3 (2024) ===
| No. overall | No. in season | Title | Directed by | Written by | Original release date |
|---|---|---|---|---|---|
| 21 | 1 | "Just the Two of Us" | Jamie Eliezer Karas | Sam Laybourne | May 1, 2024 |
| 22 | 2 | "Mamma Mia" | Jamie Eliezer Karas | Jason Belleville | May 1, 2024 |
| 23 | 3 | "Dead Man's Party" | Nicole Treston Abranian | Hailey Chavez | May 8, 2024 |
| 24 | 4 | "Private Dancer" | Nicole Treston Abranian | Rob Sudduth | May 15, 2024 |
| 25 | 5 | "Sweet Dreams Are Made Of This" | Claire Scanlon | Ilse Apellaniz | May 22, 2024 |
| 26 | 6 | "Take A Chance On Me" | Claire Scanlon | Francisco Cabrera-Feo | May 29, 2024 |
| 27 | 7 | "Video Killed The Radio Star" | Catalina Aguilar Mastretta | Celeste Klaus | June 5, 2024 |
| 28 | 8 | "Amor Eterno" | Catalina Aguilar Mastretta | Bernardo Cubria | June 12, 2024 |
| 29 | 9 | "Rock You Like a Hurricane" | Jamie Eliezer Karas | Gonzalo Lomeli & Maggie Feakins | June 19, 2024 |
| 30 | 10 | "Burning Down the House" | Jamie Eliezer Karas | Austin Winsberg | June 26, 2024 |

=== Season 4 (2025) ===
| No. overall | No. in season | Title | Directed by | Written by | Original release date |
|---|---|---|---|---|---|
| 31 | 1 | "Waterfalls" | Jamie Eliezer Karas | Sam Laybourne | July 23, 2025 |
| 32 | 2 | "Rome, If You Want To" | Austin Winsberg | Austin Winsberg | July 23, 2025 |
| 33 | 3 | "Talkin' Bout a Revolution" | Jamie Eliezer Karas | Robert Sudduth | July 30, 2025 |
| 34 | 4 | "Higher Love" | Nicole Treston Abranian | Hailey Chavez | August 6, 2025 |
| 35 | 5 | "In the Air Tonight" | Nicole Treston Abranian | Ilse Apellaniz | August 13, 2025 |
| 36 | 6 | "Eso Me Enseño Mama" | Oscar Almengor | Bernardo Cubria | August 20, 2025 |
| 37 | 7 | "The Heat Is On" | Jamie Eliezer Karas | Francisco Cabrera-Feo | August 27, 2025 |
| 38 | 8 | "Runnin' Down a Dream" | Jamie Eliezer Karas | Celeste Klaus | September 3, 2025 |
| 39 | 9 | "The Winner Takes It All" | Santiago Limón | Maggie Feakins | September 10, 2025 |
| 40 | 10 | "Never Gonna Give You Up" | Santiago Limón | Gonzalo Lomeli & Sam Laybourne | September 17, 2025 |

== Production ==
=== Development ===
In December 2020, Apple gave a series order for Acapulco, created by Austin Winsberg, Eduardo Cisneros, and Jason Shuman with inspiration from the 2017 film How to Be a Latin Lover. Winsberg is said to be the showrunner, along with Chris Harris, who are both executive producing along with Shuman, Cisneros, Eugenio Derbez, Benjamin Odell, Eric Tannenbaum, and Kim Tannenbaum.

Originally, Gaz Alazraki was set to executive produce and direct the pilot episode, but in March 2021, it was reported that Richard Shepard would instead direct the pilot.

The series premiered on Apple TV+ on October 8, 2021. On March 4, 2022, Apple renewed the series for a second season, which premiered on October 21, 2022. Apple Music released the season's official soundtrack to promote the renewal. The list includes the song "Sombrero", which was performed by Mexican Dubwiser and written by David Asante.

On January 30, 2023, Apple renewed the series for a third season, which premiered on May 1, 2024. On August 27, 2024, Apple renewed the series for a fourth season. On May 6, 2025, it was announced that the series would conclude with its fourth season, which premiered on July 23, 2025.

=== Casting ===
When the series was ordered in December 2020, Eugenio Derbez was announced as headlining. In March 2021, Enrique Arrizon, Raphael Alejandro, Damián Alcázar, and Camila Perez joined the cast. Additionally, Jessica Collins, Chord Overstreet, Vanessa Bauche, Rafael Cebrián, Fernando Carsa, and Regina Reynoso joined in April 2021.

=== Filming ===
Production began on April 7, 2021, in Puerto Vallarta, Mexico, and wrapped filming on June 20, 2021.

== Reception ==
On the review aggregator website Rotten Tomatoes, 100% of 15 critics' reviews are positive, with an average rating of 7.4/10. The website's consensus reads: "Buoyed by its talented ensemble and smart, genial humor, Acapulco is as sweetly nostalgic as it is utterly charming."

=== Awards and nominations ===
| Award | Date of ceremony | Category | Recipient(s) and nominee(s) | Result | Ref. |
|---|---|---|---|---|---|
| Imagen Awards | August 21, 2026 | Best Actor – Comedy | Enrique Arrizon | Won (tie) | |
