= Arcelia Ramírez =

Mexican actress (born 1967)

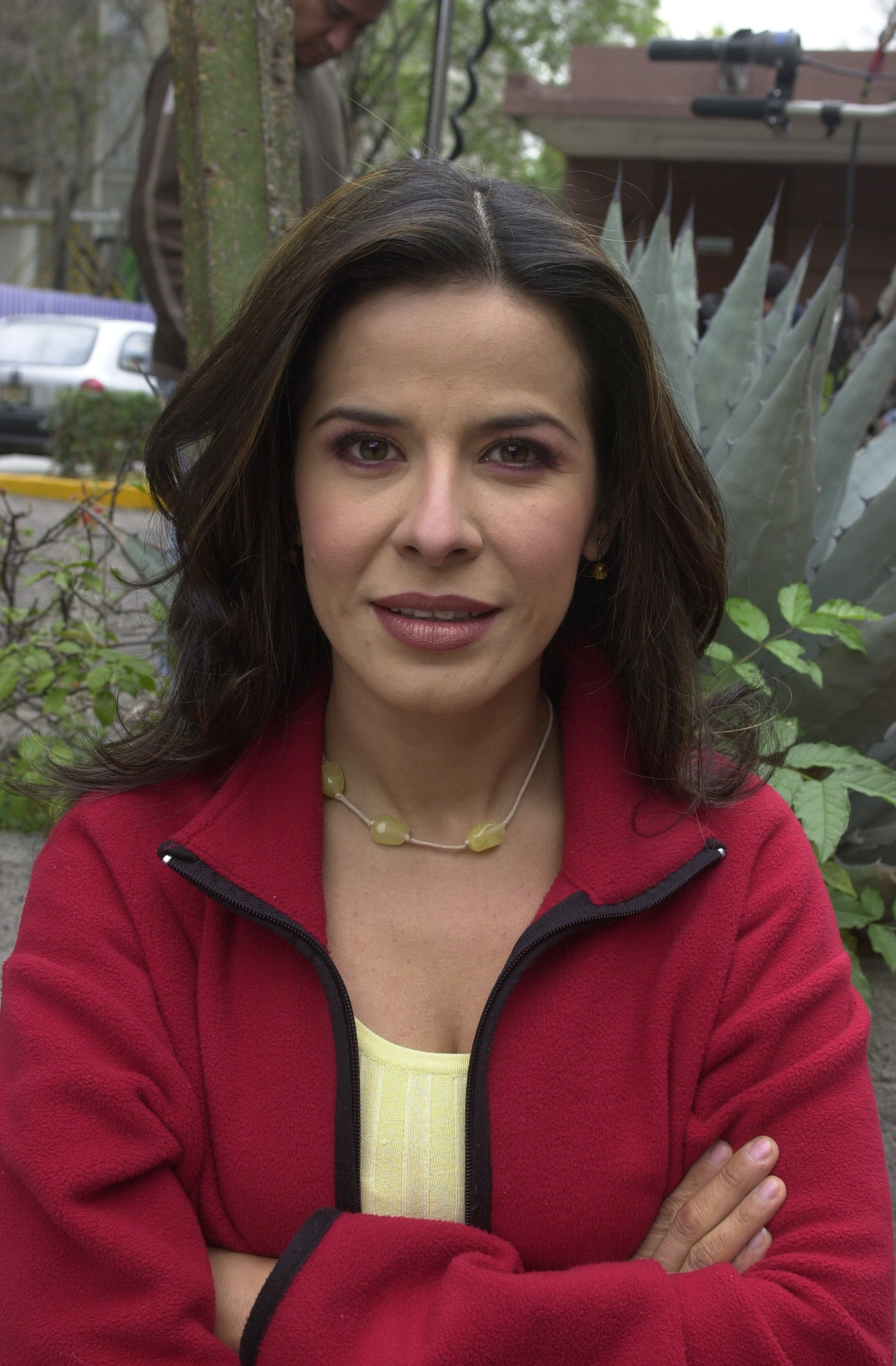
- Born: 7 December 1967 (age 58); Mexico City, Mexico
- Occupation: Actress
- Years active: 1985–present

Arcelia Ramírez (born 7 December 1967) is a Mexican actress. She has appeared in more than 50 films and television shows since 1985. She starred in the film Such Is Life, which was screened in the Un Certain Regard section at the 2000 Cannes Film Festival.

== Selected filmography ==
- Like Water for Chocolate (1991)
- La mujer de Benjamín (1991)
- Loop (1999)
- Such Is Life (2000)
- Violet Perfume: No One Is Listening (2001)
- Zurdo (2003)
- Sexo, amor y otras perversiones (2006)
- Rock Mari (2010)
- The Reasons of the Heart (2011)
- Potosí (2013)
- Buen Día, Ramón (2013)
- Bleak Street (2015)
- Juana Inés (2016)
- Veronica (2017)
- I Carry You With Me (2020)
- La Civil (2021)
- Tell Me About Yourself (2022)
- Ojos que no ven (2022)

== Telenovelas ==
- El color de la pasion (2014) Supporting Role
- Un camino hacia el destino (2016) Supporting Role
- Por siempre Joan Sebastian (2016) Recurring Role
- Sin rastro de ti (2016) Special Appearance
- Hijas de la luna (2018) Supporting Role
- El Club (2019) Supporting Role
- Vencer el miedo (2020) Co-protagonist
- Doménica Montero (2025) Supporting Role
