= The Beginning and the End (1993 film) =

1993 film

- Film poster
- Directed by: Arturo Ripstein
- Written by: Paz Alicia Garciadiego
- Starring: Ernesto Laguardia
- Release date: September 1993
- Running time: 188 minutes
- Country: Mexico
- Language: Spanish

The Beginning and the End (Spanish: Principio y fin) is a 1993 Mexican drama film directed by Arturo Ripstein. The film was selected as the Mexican entry for the Best Foreign Language Film at the 67th Academy Awards, but was not accepted as a nominee. This film is an adaptation of the 1960 novel by Egyptian author Naguib Mahfouz.

== Cast ==
- Ernesto Laguardia as Gabriel Botero
- Julieta Egurrola as Ignacia Botero
- Blanca Guerra as Julia
- Verónica Merchant as Natalia
- Bruno Bichir as Nicolás Botero
- Alberto Estrella as Guama Botero
- Alonso Echánove as Cariñoso
- Lucía Muñoz as Mireya Botero
- Luis Felipe Tovar as César
- Julián Pastor as Luján
- Luisa Huertas as Isabel

== See also ==
- List of submissions to the 67th Academy Awards for Best Foreign Language Film
- List of Mexican submissions for the Academy Award for Best Foreign Language Film
