= The Realm of Fortune =

1986 film

- Directed by: Arturo Ripstein
- Written by: Juan Rulfo; Paz Alicia Garciadiego
- Starring: Ernesto Gómez Cruz
- Release date: 28 November 1986 (US)
- Running time: 130 minutes
- Country: Mexico
- Language: Spanish

The Realm of Fortune (Spanish: El imperio de la fortuna) is a 1986 Mexican drama film directed by Arturo Ripstein. It is based on the short novel El gallo de oro by Juan Rulfo. The film was selected as the Mexican entry for the Best Foreign Language Film at the 59th Academy Awards, but was not accepted as a nominee.

== Cast ==
- Ernesto Gómez Cruz as Dionisio Pinzón
- Blanca Guerra as La Caponera
- Alejandro Parodi as Lorenzo Benavides
- Zaide Silvia Gutiérrez as La Pinzona
- Socorro Avelar as Madre de Dionisio
- Juan Antonio Llanes as Cura de San Miguel
- Carlos Cardán as Don Isabel
- Loló Navarro as Doña Iris

== See also ==
- List of submissions to the 59th Academy Awards for Best Foreign Language Film
- List of Mexican submissions for the Academy Award for Best Foreign Language Film
