= The Beginning and the End (novel) =

1949 novel by Naguib Mahfouz

- Author: Naguib Mahfouz
- Original title: بداية ونهاية
- Language: Arabic
- Publication date: 1949
- Pages: 412

The Beginning and the End (Arabic: بداية ونهاية) is a novel by Egyptian writer Naguib Mahfouz, first published in 1949. The novel is set in the suburbs of Cairo in the late 1930s and deals with the trials and tribulations of a middle-class family who are struggling to keep out of poverty after the death of the father, the sole breadwinner. The novel is marked by very bold characterization for the time period and setting, and the story moves at a prolific pace as it tries to look at the world from each character's viewpoint.

Mahfouz has been credited with modernizing Arabic literature with his prolific writing style and his themes on existentialism. He was awarded the Nobel Prize in Literature in 1988.

== Plot ==
The family comprises the mother, Samira; the eldest son, Hassan; a grown-up daughter, Nefisa; and teenage sons Hussein and Hassanein. Hassan, the eldest son, leaves home and becomes a local goon managing a coffee house. His live-in relationship with a prostitute is ignored by the family so long as he is able to meet the demands of his brothers. The family does not approve of his relationship or his work.

The daughter, Nefisa, starts out as a dressmaker, turning a hobby into a full-time occupation, and – as she sees it – degrading herself. Her faith in men takes a beating after her lover, the local grocer’s son, cheats her into sex and then marries another woman. Nefisa, the adored but plain daughter, can never get over this incident nor is able to control her sexual urges, turning her into a woman who sleeps with strangers. The money she earns from this is an added source of income.

Hussein, the elder of the two teenagers, sacrifices his higher studies and any hope of a bright future to allow the youngest, Hassanein, to complete his education and join the War College, where education fees are exorbitant. The family gives in to this scheme, while knowing that Hassanein might not turn out to be the savior of the family once he gets a job. Hassanein is a self-centered child who does no harm to anyone but is sure to watch out for himself. When his amorous demands are turned down by his fiancée, he lusts after women, always ready to take offense and cursing his fate. Hassanein believes that he was born into this world to lead a rich life without any troubles and it is the duty of each of his family members to put him ahead of their own interest.

The story contains hope since it begins with the knowledge that the children are grown-up, so there could be a way out of their poverty as soon as they get a job. However, Mahfouz has managed to weave the paralytic conditions destroying this hope at every milestone into each of the protagonists' lives. The description of the house and the building where they stay gives a claustrophobic feeling, which the reader hopes to escape with each character, only to again move into a new and equally claustrophobic setting.

== Adaptations ==
=== Film ===
There are few film adaptations of the novel:

- The Beginning and The End (1960 film), Egyptian film directed by Salah Abouseif
- The Beginning and the End (1993 film), Mexican film by Arturo Ripstein
