= Bradley Gregg =

American actor

- Occupation: Actor
- Years active: 1984–present

Bradley Gregg is an American actor, active in film and television productions.

Gregg has appeared in Hollywood films since the 1980s and is perhaps best known for his supporting roles in Stand by Me (1986), A Nightmare on Elm Street 3: Dream Warriors (1987), and Indiana Jones and the Last Crusade (1989).

== Filmography ==
=== Film ===
Year	Title	Role	Type
1985	Explorers	Steve Jackson's Gang Member	Feature film
1986	Stand by Me	Richard 'Eyeball' Chambers	Feature film
1987	A Nightmare on Elm Street 3: Dream Warriors	Phillip Anderson	Feature film
1989	Indiana Jones and the Last Crusade	Roscoe	Feature film
1990	Madhouse	Jonathan	Feature film
1990	Class of 1999	Cody Culp	Feature film
1991	The Fisher King	Hippie Bum	Feature film
1991	Eye of the Storm	Steven	Feature film
1993	Fire in the Sky	Bobby Cogdill	Feature film
1994	The Foot Shooting Party	Uncle Rose	Feature film
1997	George B.	Jerry	
1997	Vicious Circle	Carlos	
1999	How to Become Famous	Matt	
2002	Whiplash		Brad
2012	Remnant		
2015	Toy Soldier	Darryl Curtis (voice)	
2016	Boonville Redemption	Pastor Virgil Palmer	
2019	Welcome to Acapulco	Anthony	Feature film

=== Television ===
Year	Title	Role	Type
1988	21 Jump Street	Punk band member	TV series
1989	Lonesome Dove	Sean O'Brien	Miniseries
1992	O Pioneers!	Young Oscar	TV movie

=== Theatre ===
Year	Title	Role	Type
1997	Nightwatch	Theater Actor (uncredited)	

==== As Producer ====
- 14 Days in America (2005)

==== As Director ====
- Journey to Jemima (2006)
- Cedars of Lebanon (2015)
