= Rafael Velasco =

Mexican actor (1947–2004)

Rafael Velasco (November 3, 1947 – September 12, 2004) was a Mexican film/television actor. He participated in the Cinema of Mexico from 1980 to 2004.

== Biography ==
Rafael Tobías Velasco Romero was born in Mexico City, Distrito Federal, Mexico. Rafael started making movies in 1979, when he made his first appearance in the Mexican movie "Malas Influences, Las", he then made his 5th appearance in the American movie "Solo" which was made in 1996.

Velasco married Margarita Villaseñor Sanabria on November 3, 1991 (on Velasco's birthday), they were married until Velasco's death in 2004.

Rafael VeIasco died on September 12, 2004, in Mexico City, Mexico, he was 56 years old at the time of his death. He had died from myocardial infarction.

== Filmography ==
- Zapata - El sueño del héroe (2004) - Don Lázaro
- Virgen de Guadalupe, La (2002) (mini TV series) - Rafael Bernardino
- El Gavilán de la Sierra (2001) - Aurelio
- Rito terminal (2000) -
- Sueño del caimán, El (2000) - Caimán
- El evangelio de las maravillas (1998) - Mateo
- Último profeta, El (1998) -
- Solo (1996) - Justos
- Revancha, La (1995) - Negro
- Pícara soñadora, La (1991) (TV series) -
- Crimen imposible (1990) -
- Extraño retorno de Diana Salazar, El (1988) -
- Malas influencias, Las (1980) -
