= Atrévete a olvidarme =

- Genre: Telenovela; Romance; Drama
- Created by: Martha Carrillo; Roberto Hernández Vázquez; Martha Oláiz
- Written by: Mario Hernández; Javier Ruan; Guenia Argomedo; Alejandra León de la Barra; María Elena López Castañeda
- Directed by: Alberto Cortés; Gustavo Hernández
- Starring: Jorge Salinas; Adriana Fonseca; Alexis Ayala; Mariana Seoane; Ignacio López Tarso
- Opening theme: Eres mía by Pepe Aguilar
- Country of origin: Mexico
- Original language: Spanish
- No. of episodes: 25

Production
- Executive producer: Roberto Hernández Vázquez
- Producers: Jesús Acuña Lee; Alberto Cortés
- Production locations: Filming; Televisa San Ángel; Mexico City, Mexico; Locations; Real del Monte, Mexico
- Camera setup: Multi-camera
- Running time: 41-44 minutes
- Production company: Televisa

Original release
- Network: Canal de las Estrellas
- Release: August 6 – September 7, 2001

Atrévete a olvidarme (English title: Dare to forget me) is a short-lived Mexican telenovela produced by Roberto Hernández Vázquez for Televisa in 2001. It run for only one month in 2001.

On August 6, 2001, Canal de las Estrellas started broadcasting Atrévete a olvidarme weekdays at 5:00 p.m., replacing Esmeralda. The last episode was broadcast on September 7, 2001.

Jorge Salinas and Adriana Fonseca starred as protagonists, while Alexis Ayala and Mariana Seoane starred as antagonists.

== Plot ==
Many years ago, Gonzalo loved Elena. He broke up with Olga, what caused a tragedy that parted Elena's life. Now Gonzalo, old and married, lives in the village of Real del Monte, obsessed by the memory of his great love whose spirit haunts the place.

Daniel, nephew of Gonzalo and Olga, is a young journalist, motivated by a supernatural vision, comes to Real del Monte in order to visit his grandfather. There he falls in love with Andrea "la guapa" (the niece) and a romance begins in a way as tragical as the one Gonzalo lived. Andrea breaks up with the engineer Manuel, in spite of her promise.

Manuel, full of hate, decides to take revenge. Scared, Andrea breaks up with Daniel, who falls in the trap of Ernestina, Manuel's sister. Andrea does not want to stay with Manuel, but she cannot return to Daniel. Her father's death lets her in financial problems. Desperate, Andrea decides to take refuge in the brothel of the village.

== Cast ==
- Jorge Salinas as Daniel González Rivas-Montaño
- Adriana Fonseca as Andrea Rosales "La Guapa"
- Alexis Ayala as Manuel Soto Castañeda
- Mariana Seoane as Ernestina Soto Castañeda
- Ignacio López Tarso as Don Gonzalo Rivas-Montaño
- José Carlos Ruiz as Cecilio Rabadán
- Ana Martín as Sabina
- Macaria as Hanna Rivas-Montaño Bocker de González
- Raquel Olmedo as La Coronela
- Juan Peláez as Santiago Rosales
- Adriana Roel as Evarista
- Juan Carlos Bonet as Rosendo
- Yolanda Ventura as Luján Beccar Varela
- Jorge Poza as El Gato
- Francesca Guillén as Lucina
- Arsenio Campos as Patricio
- Aurora Clavel as Eduarda
- Socorro Avelar as Epitacia
- Jaime Lozano as Father Buenaventura
- Alejandra Barros as Olga Bocker de Rivas-Montaño
- Rebeca Tamez as Elena Bocker
- Olivia Cairo as Rita
- Jacarandá Alfaro as Ludivina
- Everardo de la Mora as Gerard
- Hugo Macías Macotela as Dr. Nazario
- Patricia Martínez as Refugio
- Roberto Miquel as Vicencio
- Queta Lavat as Fidela
- Edgar Ponce as Soriano
- Luis Reynoso as Melesio
- Alberto Estrella as Yong Gonzalo Rivas-Montaño
- Daniela Aedo as Child Andrea Rosales
