= Compadres (film) =

- American theatrical release poster
- Directed by: Enrique Begne
- Written by: Enrique Begne; Ted Perkins; Gabriel Ripstein
- Produced by: Francisco González Compeán; Ben Odell
- Starring: Omar Chaparro; Aislinn Derbez; José Sefami; Erick Elías; Camila Sodi; Joaquín Cosío; Héctor Jimenez; Eric Roberts; Rip Torn; Joey Morgan; Kevin Pollak
- Cinematography: Federico Barbabosa
- Edited by: Jorge Macaya
- Music by: Joan Valent, C-Kan
- Production company: Draco Films
- Distributed by: Videocine S.A. de C.V.
- Release date: 31 March 2016
- Running time: 102 minutes
- Country: Mexico
- Languages: English; Spanish
- Budget: $3 million
- Box office: $7.4 million

Compadres is a 2016 Mexican action comedy film directed by Enrique Begne and co-written with Ted Perkins and Gabriel Ripstein. This film featured a cast of Mexican and American actors made up of Omar Chaparro, Aislinn Derbez, José Sefami, Erick Elías, Camila Sodi, Joaquín Cosío, Héctor Jimenez, Eric Roberts, Rip Torn, Joey Morgan and Kevin Pollak.

The film was released on 31 March 2016 in Mexico and on 22 April 2016 in the United States.

== Plot ==
After being released from prison, former Mexican cop Diego Garza (Omar Chaparro) seeks revenge on Santos (Erick Elias). Santos has kidnapped his girlfriend María (Aislinn Derbez) and framed him for a crime he didn't commit. With the help of his former boss Coronado (José Sefami), Garza manages to escape with a tip about how to find Santos which leads him to San Diego in search of an "accountant." This said accountant is responsible for stealing $10 million from Santos and may know Santos' whereabouts. When Garza arrives, he is shocked to find that the infamous accountant is a 17 year old white American computer hacker named Vic (Joey Morgan). Despite an immediate disdain for each other, these two divided by culture, language and age, realize that Garza's low tech brain and Vic's high tech hacker skills may be their only chance at finding Santos before he finds them.

== Cast ==
- Omar Chaparro as Diego Garza
- Aislinn Derbez as María
- José Sefami as Coronado
- Eric Roberts as Dalton
- Joey Morgan as Vic
- Erick Elías as Santos
- Héctor Jiménez as Guasa
- Rip Torn as "Tex", The Banker
- Camila Sodi as Emilia
- Evan Henderson as Dalton's Partner
- Joaquín Cosío as Gaspar
- Efren Ramirez as "El Payas"
- Kevin Pollak
- Espinoza Paz
- Adrián Uribe

== Music ==
Omar Chaparro interprets the main song of the movie, Si hubiera sabido.

== Release ==
=== Box office ===
Compadres opened theatrically in the United States from Pantelion Films on 22 April 2016 in 368 venues and earned $1,397,434 in its opening weekend, ranking ninth in the North American box office and second among the new releases. In Mexico, the film was released on 31 March and, as of 17 April, had grossed $4,225,771, bringing the film's worldwide total to $5,623,205.

=== Critical reception ===
The film received mixed to negative reviews from critics. On Rotten Tomatoes, it has a 40% approval score based on 15 reviews, with an average rating of 4.4/10. Metacritic reports a 28 out of 100 rating based on 5 critics, indicating "generally unfavorable reviews".
