= Devil Between the Legs =

- Directed by: Arturo Ripstein
- Screenplay by: Paz Alicia Garciadiego
- Produced by: Antonio Chavarrías; Marco Polo Constandse
- Starring: Sylvia Pasquel
- Cinematography: Alejandro Cantú
- Edited by: Mariana Rodríguez
- Music by: David Mansfield
- Release date: September 12, 2019 (Toronto)
- Running time: 147 minutes
- Country: Mexico
- Language: Spanish

Devil Between the Legs is a 2019 Mexican romantic drama film directed by Arturo Ripstein and starring Sylvia Pasquel.

== Plot ==
This black and white film brings up the topic of sex and passion at an older age. The couple portrayed has a love/hate relationship, an ambivalence that is reflected in their sexual relation where the man adopts an abusive stance towards the woman. A third character, the maid, fuels a triptic dynamic in this natural perversion.

== Cast ==
- Sylvia Pasquel as Beatriz
- Alejandro Suárez as The Old Man
- Greta Cervantes as Dinorah
- Daniel Giménez Cacho
