= Seduction (1981 film) =

1981 film

- Directed by: Arturo Ripstein
- Written by: Carlos Castañón; Arturo Ripstein
- Starring: Katy Jurado
- Cinematography: Álex Phillips Jr.
- Release dates: July 1981 (Moscow); 27 May 1982 (Mexico)
- Running time: 90 minutes
- Country: Mexico
- Language: Spanish

Seduction (Spanish: La seducción) is a 1981 Mexican erotic drama film directed by Arturo Ripstein. It was entered into the 12th Moscow International Film Festival.

== Cast ==
- Katy Jurado as Isabel
- Viridiana Alatriste as Mariana
- Gonzalo Vega as Felipe
- Noé Murayama as Romulo
