= Deep Crimson =

- Spanish theatrical poster
- Directed by: Arturo Ripstein
- Written by: Paz Alicia Garciadiego
- Produced by: Marin Karmitz; Pablo Barbachano; José María Morales; Miguel Necoechea
- Starring: Regina Orozco; Daniel Giménez Cacho
- Cinematography: Guillermo Granillo
- Edited by: Rafael Castanedo
- Music by: David Mansfield
- Release date: 1996
- Running time: 114 minutes
- Country: Mexico
- Language: Spanish
- Box office: 31.6 million ESP

Deep Crimson (Spanish: Profundo carmesí) is a 1996 Mexican crime film directed by Arturo Ripstein, written by Paz Alicia Garciadiego and starring Regina Orozco and Daniel Giménez Cacho. Like The Honeymoon Killers before it, the film is a dramatization of the story of "Lonely Hearts Killers", Raymond Fernandez and Martha Beck, who committed a string of murders of women in the 1940s.

== Plot ==
In Mexico, Coral works as a nurse for a morgue and has two young children, Carlos and Teresa. She decorates her bedroom with pictures of French actor Charles Boyer. One night, during work, Coral responds to a lonely hearts ad by Nicolás Estrella, a Spanish drifter who claims he resembles Boyer. Nicolás reads Coral's letter and arrives at her house during the day and again during the night. They sleep together until Nicolás steals Coral's money and leaves.

Coral follows Nicolás to his residence with her children, having caught him in the act. Coral unsuccessfully persuades Nicolás that they can live together, but he refuses as he does not want to raise her children. The next morning, Coral abandons her children at a convent and returns to Nicolás. She figures out Nicolás's scam as he seduces and robs lonely unsuspecting women. Coral pledges to become his partner in crime and pose as his sister.

Together, Coral and Nicolás arrive at a bar where Juanita Norton, an older widow, has responded to Nicolás's ad. Juanita insults Coral about her weight, and as she dances with Nicolás, Cora pours rat poison into her cocktail in jealousy. Juanita starts gasping when she drinks the poison and is taken inside Nicolás's car. They leave Juanita to die at a train station where Coral steals her purse. The next morning, during their car ride, Nicolás's toupée flies off and becomes dirtied, which enrages him. Coral however repairs it, using her skills as a nurse.

Coral and Nicolás pose as Catholic missionaries, where they answer a letter from Irene Gallardo, an older Spanish Catholic. Irene's next-door neighbor Sara Silberman probes Nicolás a series of questions, to which Nicolás responds with unconvincing answers. Sara is immediately distrustful of them, but before she leaves, she warns Irene about Coral and Nicolás's deception. As they stay with Irene, Nicolás successfully seduces Irene as they recite the Lord's Prayer. Coral is then told that Irene wants to marry Nicolás.

Nicolás and Irene are married at a gravesite as cemeteries are considered sacred ground. Later that night, at a motel, Coral denounces Irene as an adulteress. As Nicolás consoles Irene, Coral bursts into their bedroom and tells Irene she is in love with Nicolás. Irene, repulsed at the notion of incest, kneels and loudly prays for their forgiveness. As Irene's back is turned, Coral strikes Irene with a statue of Jesus and kills her. She cleans the crime scene and they bury Irene in an unmarked grave.

Coral and Nicolás next target Rebeca Sanpedro, a widow whose husband operated a mechanic shop. Coral suspects Rebeca is an older widow, but Rebeca is in fact a young widow with a young daughter. Rebeca hires Nicolás to run the mechanic shop, and within months, he seduces and impregnates Rebeca. When Rebeca is about to deliver, Coral feeds her anticoagulant tablets. As they rummage through Rebeca's papers, Rebeca unexpectedly enters and Nicolás murders her. Coral then drowns Rebeca's daughter.

Trapped in their guilt, Coral and Nicolás declare they are eternal accomplices, united in blood and in death. Nicolás phones the local authorities, in which he and Cora turn themselves in for the murders. They are given the death penalty by firing squad. On the morning of their execution, Coral states it has been the "happiest day of my life" before she and Nicolás are shot to death and lie beside each other in a puddle of water.

== Cast ==
- Regina Orozco as Coral Fabre
- Daniel Giménez Cacho as Nicolás Estrella
- Sherlyn as Teresa
- Giovani Florido as Carlitos (as Giovanni Florido)
- Fernando Soler Palavicini as Don Dimas (as Fernando Soler P.)
- Patricia Reyes Spíndola as Sra. Ruelas
- Alexandra Vicencio as Imelda (as Alexandra Vincenzio)
- Julieta Egurrola as Juanita Norton
- Marisa Paredes as Irene Gallardo
- Rosa Furman as Sara Silberman
- Verónica Merchant as Rebeca Sanpedro
- Juan de la Loza as Car salesman

== Reception ==
=== Critical reception ===
On Rotten Tomatoes, the film holds an approval rating of 80% based on 10 reviews, with a weighted average rating of 6.6/10.

=== Awards and honors ===
The film won eight Ariel Awards, including Best Actor and Best Actress and was nominated for the Golden Ariel. In addition, it was awarded Honorable Mention in the Latin American Cinema category at Sundance and won three Golden Osellas at the Venice Film Festival. It was Mexico's official submission for the Academy Award for Best Foreign Language Film, but it failed to earn a nomination.

== See also ==
- The Honeymoon Killers, a 1969 film about the same events
- Lonely Hearts, a 2006 film about the same events
- Alleluia, a 2014 film about the same events
- List of submissions to the 70th Academy Awards for Best Foreign Language Film
- List of Mexican submissions for the Academy Award for Best Foreign Language Film
