= Alberto Estrella =

Mexican actor (born 1962)

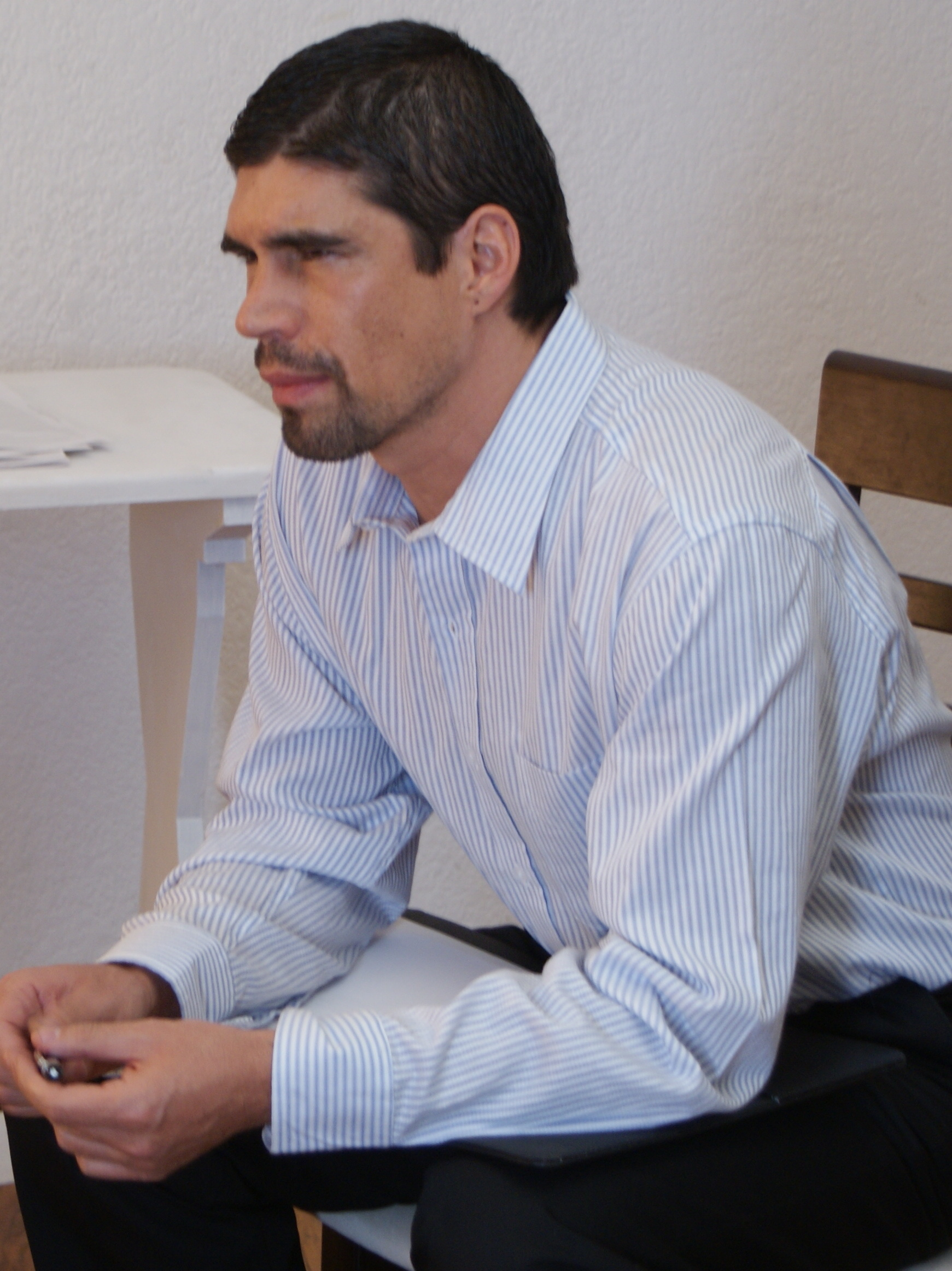
- Born: 23 September 1962 (age 63); Guadalajara, Jalisco, Mexico
- Occupations: Actor, writer
- Years active: 1986–present

Alberto Estrella (born Alberto Rodríguez Estrella; 23 September 1962) is a Mexican actor. He has appeared in over 90 films and television shows since 1986.

== Biography ==
Estrella was born in Guadalajara, Jalisco, Mexico. He starred in the film The Queen of the Night, which was entered into the 1994 Cannes Film Festival. His famous telenovela roles include Marcial Andrade in Entre el amor y el odio (2002) and Carmelo Murillo in La desalmada (2021). He is also known for playing as Emiliano Zapata in the film Santos Peregrinos.

His brother is Ricardo Rodríguez Estrella.

== Filmography ==
Films
Year	Title	Role	Notes
1986	El otro		Debut film
1986	El imperio de la fortuna	Montero	
1986	Las plumas del pavorreal		Short film
1987	El umbral		Short film
1990	Los fugitivos		
1991	¿De que color son tus ojos verdes?		
1991	Encuentro de valientes		
1991	Seeds of Tragedy	Guerilla Leader	Television film
1992	Corazones de terciopelo		Short film
1992	Ruby Cairo	Hermes #2	
1993	Haciendo la lucha		Short film
1993	Principio y fin	Guama Botero	
1994	Amorosos fantasmas	Ángel II	
1994	La reina de la noche	Pedro Calderón	
1995	Salto al vacío		
1995	En el aire	Luis	
1996	Salón México	Paco	
1996	¿Por qué nosotros no?	Policeman	Short film
1996	Qué hora es?		Short film
1996	Última llamada	Gilberto Cortés	
1997	De noche vienes, Esmeralda	Jaime, Rocker Husband	
1998	El chacal de la sierra		Video
1998	Fibra óptica	The Young Executive	
1998	El corrido de Santa Amalia		Starring Role
1998	Búsqueda implacable	Teniente Quintana	
1999	Herencia de traficantes		
1999	Cómplices criminales		
1999	Santitos	Ángel	
1999	Pollitas de cuenta		
2000	El psicópata y el candidato		Video
2000	El gallo de Michoacán		Video
2000	El corrido de la Riata de Michoacán		Video
2000	Con el valor en la sangre		Video
2000	Tres reos		
2000	Sentencia de narcóticos		Video
2000	Sangre nocturna		Video
2000	Noches violentas		
2000	Cabecillas de la sierra		
2000	¡Alerta!... La justicia de Rojo	Miguel	
2001	Sotana roja		
2001	Perros de pelea		
2001	Narcos contra sotanas		Video
2001	Las dos caras del señor		
2001	La fuga del Chapo		Video
2001	Homies - Sangre en el barrio		Video
2001	El preso de Zacatecas		Video
2001	Cara prestada		
2001	Otilia	Melquíades	
2002	Simón, el gran varón	Andrés	
2002	Pacas de a mil		
2002	Destino cholo		
2002	eXXXorcismos	Roberto	
2002	La virgen de la lujuria		
2002	Malos hábitos		Short film
2003	Rivales a muerte		
2003	Calvario		Video
2003	Atrapada		Video
2004	Sangre contra sangre		Video
2004	Quiero vivo al malandrín		Video
2004	Políticos, mentiras y videos		Video
2004	Narco cabrón... Federal mas chingón	Teniente Quintana	Video
2004	El edén	Evaristo "Eva"	
2004	El fuego de la venganza	Adjutant AFI	
2004	Zapata: El sueño de un héroe	Martínez	
2004	Santos peregrinos	Emiliano Zapata	
2004	Máxima velocidad	Talibán	
2005	XX-XY fuera del mundo	El esposo	Short film
2005	Sexo impostor		
2005	Una de balazos	Consigliori	Video Short
2007	Cementerio de papel		
2007	Oblivión		Short film
2007	Quemar las naves	Emilio	
2008	Llamando a un ángel	Ángel	
2008	Crepúsculo rojo	Valente	
2008	Dulces perversiones		Short film
2008	Todos hemos pecado	El hombre sin nombre	
2009	Amar a morir	Tigre	
2009	Cabeza de buda	Rubén	
2009	Disculpe las molestias	Pedro	Short film
2009	Días extraños		Short film
2009	Un mexicano más	Maestro de civismo	
2009	El dolor de un hombre solo		Video short
2010	Juventud	Chato	
2010	Las buenas hierbas	Luis	
2010	No eres tú, soy yo	Dr. Carlos	
2010	Noche sin luna	Óscar Rodríguez	Short film
2011	Qué importa corazón	El Mudo	Short film
2012	The Fantastic World of Juan Orol	El indio Fernández	
2015	El viaje de Keta	Alberto	Post-production
2015	Los parecidos	Detective Reyes	Post-production
2015	Bleak Street		

Television
Year	Title	Role	Notes
1973	Plaza Sésamo	Abelardo Montoya	Television debut
1988	Amor en silencio	Pedro	Main role
1988-89	Dulce desafío	Ernesto Quiroz	
1991	Yo no creo en los hombres	Alfonso	Recurring role
1993	Las secretas intenciones		
1997	Alguna vez tendremos alas	Rodolfo "Gato" Sánchez	
1999	Amor gitano	Jonás	
1999	Cuento de Navidad		TV Mini-Series
2001	Mujer, casos de la vida real	Various roles	Episode: "Amores cruzados"
2001	El noveno mandamiento	Felipe Ruiz	Recurring role
2001	Atrévete a olvidarme	Young Gonzalo Rivas-Montaño	Guest role
2002	Entre el amor y el odio	Marcial Andrade	Main role
2004	Amar otra vez	Alberto	Recurring role
2005	Contra viento y marea	Valente Ortigosa	Main role
2007	Pasión	Marío Fuentes	Main role
2008	Mujeres asesinas	Víctor Ceballos	"Cándida, esperanzada" (Season 1, Episode 8)
2008-09	Alma de hierro	Ángel "Angelito" Hierro Ramírez	Main role
2009	Adictos		2 episodes
2010	Niña de mi corazón		Episode: "El ángel Uriel"
2010	Gritos de muerte y libertad	José María Morelos	4 episodes
2010-11	Para volver a amar	Rodrigo Longoria	Recurring role
2011	El Equipo	Santiago Quiron	Recurring role
2011-14	Como dice el dicho	Marco / Lucio	"Al que no habla" (Season 1, Episode 40) "Cada quien se pone la corona" (Season 4, Episode 6) "Nunca juzgues a un libro" (Season 4, Episode 19)
2013-14	Lo que la vida me robó	Juventino Zamudio	Main role; 42 episodes
2014	La malquerida	Danilo Vargas	Main role; 109 episodes
2015	Hasta el fin del mundo	Don	Guest role; 6 episodes
2019	Por amar sin ley	Diego Molina	Guest role
2019	Ringo	Guido Guevara	Recurring role
2020	Vencer el miedo	Vicente Durán	Main role
2021	La desalmada	Carmelo Murillo	Main role
2022	Esta historia me suena	Octavio	Episode: "Que lo nuestro se quede en nuestro"
2022-23	Mi camino es amarte	Macario Hernández	Main role
2023	Mariachis	Jorge Cuevas	Main role
2023	Gloria Trevi: Ellas soy yo	Judge of Chihuahua	Recurring role
2023	El gallo de oro	Don Lucas	Recurring role
2025	Regalo de amor	Gáspar de la Vega Ortigoza	
2025	Doménica Montero	Prudencio Pérez Hernández	
2026	Una familia complicada	Genaro	
