= El evangelio de las maravillas =

1998 film

- Directed by: Arturo Ripstein
- Written by: Paz Alicia Garciadiego
- Produced by: Laura Imperiale
- Starring: Francisco Rabal
- Cinematography: Guillermo Granillo
- Edited by: Ximena Cuevas
- Music by: David Mansfield
- Release date: 25 September 1998
- Running time: 112 minutes
- Country: Mexico
- Language: Spanish

El evangelio de las maravillas ("The Gospel of the Marvels") is a 1998 Mexican drama film directed by Arturo Ripstein. It was screened in the Un Certain Regard section at the 1998 Cannes Film Festival.

== Plot ==
"La Nueva Jerusalem" is a small community of believers led by Papá Basilio (Rabal) and Mamá Dorita (Jurado). They're waiting for the second coming of Christ, so they've abandoned the world, searching for a new spiritual life. Mamá Dorita sees in young Tomasa (Gurrola) the signals of the chosen one. The young girl will be the new leader in "La Nueva Jerusalem".

== Cast ==
- Francisco Rabal as Papá Basilio
- Katy Jurado as Mamá Dorita
- Flor Eduarda Gurrola as Tomasa (as Edwarda Gurrola)
- Carolina Papaleo as Nélida
- Bruno Bichir as Gavilán
- Patricia Reyes Spíndola as Micaela
- Rafael Inclán
- Rodrigo Ostap as Fidel
- Angelina Peláez as Elodia
- Gina Morett as Rita
- Juan Carlos Colombo
- Rafael Velasco as Mateo
- Marta Aura
- Asunción Balaguer as woman in the congregation
- Teresa Mondragón
- Julieta Egurrola as Tomasa's mother
