= No One Writes to the Colonel =

1961 novella by Gabriel García Márquez

- First edition
- Author: Gabriel García Márquez
- Original title: El coronel no tiene quien le escriba
- Translator: J. S. Bernstein
- Language: Spanish
- Publisher: Aguirre Editor, Medellin
- Publication date: 1961
- Publication place: Colombia
- English publication date: 1 Sep 1968
- Media type: Print (hardback & paperback)
- ISBN: 0-06-011417-7 (hardback first Eng. edition)
- OCLC: 234241843

No One Writes to the Colonel (Spanish: El coronel no tiene quien le escriba) is a 1961 novella written by the Colombian writer Gabriel García Márquez. It also gives its name to a short story collection. García Márquez considered it his best book, saying that he had to write One Hundred Years of Solitude so that people would read No One Writes to the Colonel.

The novella was written between 1956 and 1957 while the author was living in Paris in the Hotel des Trois Colleges and was first published in 1958, in Mito Revista Bimestral de Cultura v. IV no. 19 (May-June 1958), with first separate publication in 1961.

== Plot summary ==
The novella is the story of an impoverished retired colonel, a veteran of the Thousand Days' War, who still hopes to receive the pension he was promised some fifteen years earlier. The colonel lives with his asthmatic wife in a small village under martial law. The action opens with the colonel preparing to go to the funeral of a town musician whose death is notable because he was the first to die from natural causes in many years. The novel is set during the years of "La Violencia" in Colombia, when martial law and censorship prevail.

First English edition (publ. Harper & Row)

== Literary significance and criticism ==
The novel is often considered realist when compared with García Márquez's other works, containing less overt magic realism. The main characters of the novel are not named, adding to the feeling of insignificance of an individual living in Colombia. The colonel and his wife, who have lost their son to political repression, are struggling with poverty. The corruption of the local and national officials is evident and this is a topic which García Márquez explores throughout the novel, by using references to censorship and the impact of government on society. The colonel desperately tries to sell their inheritance from their only son who is now dead and eventually the only reminder of his existence is a rooster that the colonel trains to take part in a cockfight.

In his memoir Vivir para contarla (Living to Tell the Tale, 2002), García Márquez explained that the novel was inspired by his grandfather, who was also a colonel and who never received the pension he was promised. However, there is also speculation that García Márquez took inspiration from his experience of unemployment in 1956 after the newspaper he had been working for shut down. The daily lives he witnessed during this time are said to be one of his inspirations for this novel.

== Film, TV or theatrical adaptations ==
A motion picture based on the novella was made in 1999. Directed by Arturo Ripstein, it stars Fernando Luján as the colonel. Another feature film based on the novella and titled Only Death Comes for Sure was released in 1993. The film was directed by Marina Tsurtsumiya.

A theatrical adaptation was staged by New York's Repertorio Español in 2018, featuring a live rooster as one of its cast.

== Release details ==
- 1958, "El coronel no tiene quien le escriba," in Mito Revista Bimestral de Cultura v. IV no. 19 (May-June 1958)
- 1961, El coronel no tiene quien le escriba (novella), Aguirre Editor (Medellin, Colombia)
- 1968, USA, Harper & Row ISBN 0-06-011417-7, Pub date 1 September 1968, hardback (Eng. trans 1st edition)
- 1996, UK, Penguin Books ISBN 0-14-015749-2, Pub date 29 February 1996, paperback (as No One Writes to the Colonel)
- 1976, USA, HarperPerennial ISBN 0-06-090700-2, Pub date ? August 1979, paperback (as No One Writes to the Colonel and Other Stories)
