= Paz Alicia Garciadiego =

Mexican screenwriter

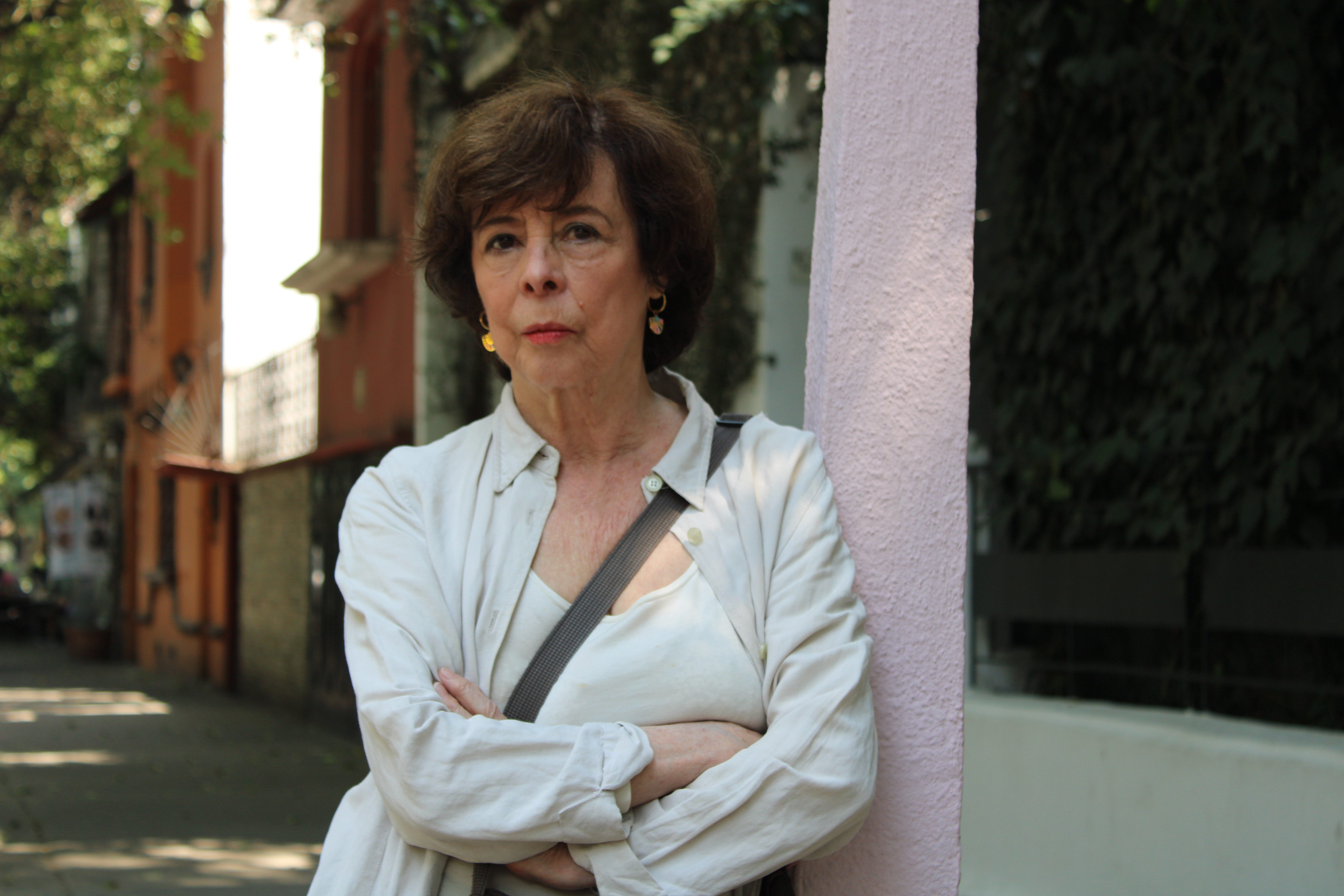

Paz Alicia Garciadiego (born in September 1949 in Mexico City) is a Mexican screenwriter and scholar, known for The Beginning and the End (Principio y fin) (1993), Deep Crimson (Profundo carmesí)) (1996) (and she won the Golden Osella for it), and Bleak Street (2015). She and her husband Arturo Ripstein have worked together on film and television since 1986 with their first collaboration The Realm of Fortune (El imperio de la fortuna) (1986), winning multiple Ariel Awards in different categories. In 2013 Garcíadiego received the Salvador Toscano prize, awarded by the Cineteca Nacional, the Fundación Carmen Toscano and the Mexican Academy of Film Arts and Sciences.

== Early life ==
Garciadiego was born in Mexico City in a middle-class family. She grew up in Colonia Juárez, Mexico City and from an early age enjoyed hearing and reading stories with her grandmother. She graduated from a Catholic School in 1968 and after having her first child she studied philosophy, literature and Latin American Studies at the National Autonomous University of Mexico (UNAM).

== Career ==
Garciadiego began working as a writer at Secretariat of Public Education (Mexico) adapting literary classics and episodes of Mexican history into comic books, then she worked writing educational content for children at Unidad de Televisión Educativa y Cultural (UTEC). There, she met director Arturo Ripstein and they made the adaptation of The Golden Cockerel by Juan Rulfo, what would be their first collaboration El imperio de la fortuna (1986)

== Works ==
=== Films ===
- Devil Between the Legs (2019)
- Bleak Street (2015)
- The Reasons of the Heart (2011)
- El carnaval de Sodoma (2006)
- La virgen de la lujuria (2002)
- La perdición de los hombres (2000)
- Así es la vida (2000) (based on Medea)
- El coronel no tiene quien le escriba (1999) (based in the novel with the same name by Gabriel García Márquez)
- El evangelio de las maravillas (1998)
- Noche de paz (1998)
- Deep Crimson (Profundo carmesí)) (1996)
- The Queen of the Night (La reina de la noche) (1994)
- Principio y fin (1993)
- La mujer del puerto (1991)
- Ciudad de ciegos (1991)
- Love Lies (Mentiras piadosas)) (1987)
- The Realm of Fortune (El imperio de la fortuna) (1986)

=== Television ===
- La Hora Marcada (1989) (episode "Noche de Paz")
