= Arturo Ripstein =

Mexican film director (born 1943)

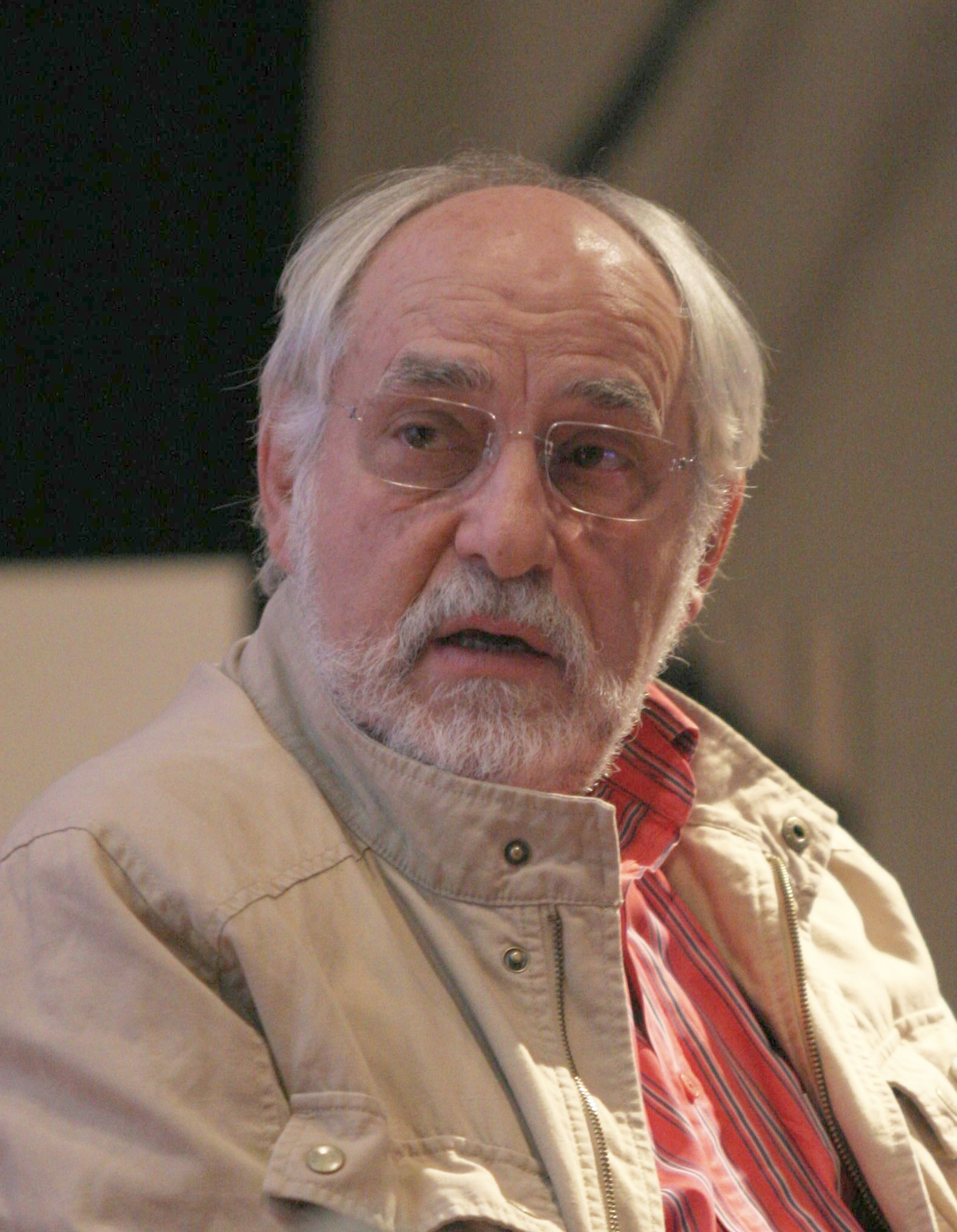
- Arturo Ripstein
- Born: Arturo Ripstein y Rosen; December 13, 1943 (age 82); Mexico City, Mexico
- Citizenship: Mexico • Spain (from 2003)
- Occupations: Film director, producer and screenwriter
- Years active: 1965 - present
- Spouse: Paz Alicia Garciadiego
- Children: 2
- Relatives: Alfredo Ripstein (father)
- Awards: National Prize for Arts 1997

Arturo Ripstein y Rosen (born December 13, 1943) is a Mexican film director and screenwriter. Considered the "Godfather of independent Mexican cinema", Ripstein's work is generally characterized by "somber, slow-paced, macabre melodramas tackling existential loneliness", often with a grotesque-like edge.

He is a nine-time Ariel Award winner, including five for Best Picture and two for Best Director. Three of his films have been nominated for the Palme d'Or at the Cannes Film Festival. In 1997, he received the prestigious National Prize for Arts and Sciences for his contributions to Mexican cinema. He was the second filmmaker (after Luis Buñuel) to receive that honour.

== Early life ==
Ripstein was born in Mexico City on 13 December 1943, to producer Alfredo Ripstein and Frida Rosen. His family is of Polish Jewish descent in both sides. He developed an interest in filmmaking from a young age due to his family's proximity, and made short films as a teenager. He met Luis Buñuel after seeing Nazarín, and they developed a close mentor-student relationship that lasted until Bunuel's death.

== Career ==
After working as Bunuel's uncredited assistant director on The Exterminating Angel (1962), Ripstein got his break into movies working learning from Luis Buñuel . In 1965, he directed Tiempo de morir, his first feature. Written by Carlos Fuentes and Gabriel García Márquez, it began a tradition of making independent films written by high-profile Latin-American authors. His 1981 film Seduction was entered into the 12th Moscow International Film Festival. His 1989 film Love Lies was entered into the 16th Moscow International Film Festival.

Some of Ripstein's films, especially the earlier ones, "highlighted characters beset by futile compulsions to escape [their] destinies". Many of his films are shot in tawdry interiors, with bleak brown color schemes, and seedy pathetic characters who manage to achieve a hint of pathos and dignity. Así es la vida, according to Jonathan Crow, "boldly reworks the ancient Greek drama Medea, employing a dizzying array of flashbacks and Brechtian devices". Deep Crimson, according to the New York Times, is "a ferociously anti-romantic portrait of an obese nurse and a seedy small-time gigolo whose bungling scheme to swindle a succession of lonely women out of their life savings turns into a killing spree."

In 1997, Ripstein won the National Prize of Arts and Sciences, the second filmmaker after Buñuel to do so.

== Personal life ==
Ripstein is married to screenwriter Paz Alicia Garciadiego, with whom he has two children. In 2003, the two received honorary Spanish citizenship.

== Selected filmography ==
- Tiempo de morir (1966)
- The Castle of Purity (1973)
- The Holy Office (1974)
- Foxtrot (1976)
- La viuda negra (1977)
- The Place Without Limits (El lugar sin límites) (1978)
- La tía Alejandra (1979)
- "La Ilegal" (1979)
- Seduction (1981)
- Rastro de muerte (1981)
- El imperio de la fortuna (1986)
- Mentiras piadosas (1989)
- Simplemente María (1989) TV
- Woman of the Port (1991)
- The Beginning and the End (1993)
- The Queen of the Night (1994)
- Deep Crimson (Profundo Carmesi) (1996)
- El evangelio de las maravillas (1998)
- No One Writes to the Colonel (1999)
- Such Is Life (2000)
- La perdición de los hombres (2000)
- The Virgin of Lust (2002)
- El carnaval de Sodoma (2006)
- Las razones del corazón (2011)
- Bleak Street (2015)
- Devil Between the Legs (2019)
