= List of Mexican films of 2014 =

This is a list of Mexican films released in 2014.

Title	Director	Cast	Genre	Notes
Panic 5 Bravo	Kuno Becker	Kuno Becker, Catherine Papile, Dan Rovzar, Raúl Méndez, Shalim Ortiz	Thriller	
Cesar Chavez	Diego Luna	Michael Peña, America Ferrera, Rosario Dawson, John Malkovich	Drama	
Carmin Tropical	Rigoberto Pérezcano			
Eddie Reynolds y los ángeles de acero	Mario Muñoz	Damián Alcázar, Arturo Ríos, Jorge Zárate, Álvaro Guerrero, Paulina Gaitán, Dolores Heredia, Vico Escorcia, Sebastián Zurita, Pavel Sfera, Fernando Villa Proal	Romantic comedy	
A Night in Old Mexico	Emilio Aragon	Robert Duvall, Jeremy Irvine, Angie Cepeda, Luis Tosar, Joaquín Cosío, Javier Gutierrez, Jim Parrack, James Landry Hébert, Michael Ray Escamilla, Abraham Benrubi	Drama	This film was released in Mexico in 2013; however, it was released in other countries such as the United States in 2014.
Güeros	Alonso Ruizpalacios	Tenoch Huerta, Sebastian Aguirre, Ilse Salas, Leonardo Ortizgris		
The Perfect Dictatorship	Luis Estrada	Damián Alcázar, Joaquín Cosío, Dagoberto Gama, María Rojo, Salvador Sánchez	Comedy	

== See also ==
- List of 2014 box office number-one films in Mexico
