= Bandidos Films =

- Industry: Entertainment
- Headquarters: Mexico City
- Products: Motion Pictures

Bandidos Films is a Mexican film production house associated with AMPI (Mexican Association of Independent Producers).

== Productions ==
Bandidos Films has been mainly characterized by its films about the government's alleged tyranny and poverty in Mexico, beginning in 1999 with "Herod's Law" and continuing into 2014 with "The Perfect Dictatorship", all starring Damián Alcázar. These films are not directly connected, but satirize and deal with similar issues and share several common themes.

- In August 1991, the film Bandidos, a co-production with Estudios Churubusco Azteca SA, premieres. The film stars Edward Toussaint and Jorge Poza.
- In 1994, the producer returns with his movie Ámbar, starring Jorge Russek as Corbett. The film is about a journey that goes beyond the certainties of reality to reveal an astonishing world ruled only by imagination.
- In 1998 the film Night Lights (film) premieres.
- In 1999, the film Herod's Law is released. The film causes controversy, containing black humor about politics and poverty in the country. Starring Damián Alcázar, Pedro Armendáriz, Jr. and Salvador Sánchez.
- In 2006 a spiritual successor is released, titled A Wonderful World, also starring Damián Alcázar. The film is a critique of the socioeconomic and political state of the country under the neoliberal regime of Vicente Fox, then President of Mexico.
- The most controversial film by the company is released in 2010 (coinciding with the 200th anniversary of the beginning of the Mexican war of independence): Hell. A film by Luis Estrada and starring Damián Alcázar, Joaquín Cosío and Ernesto Gómez Cruz. The film begins with Benny (Damián Alcázar) being deported from the United States; now penniless and jobless, he returns to his hometown and meets his old friend Cochiloco (Joaquín Cosío), who introduces him to the world of illegal drug trafficking.
- In October 2014, the company releases the film The Perfect Dictatorship, a satire of the country's political situation under Mexican President Enrique Peña Nieto, dealing with such issues as the government's relationship with the national media companies. The title is taken from a quote from Peruvian writer Mario Vargas Llosa, who called the period of one-party rule by the Institutional Revolutionary Party (of which Peña Nieto is a member), which lasted from 1929 to 2000, "the perfect dictatorship" ("la dictadura perfecta").
