= A Wonderful World (film) =

Un mundo maravilloso
- Directed by: Luis Estrada
- Written by: Luis Estrada; Jaime Samperio
- Produced by: Luis Estrada
- Starring: Damián Alcázar; Antonio Serrano; Cecilia Suárez; Gabriela de la Garza
- Cinematography: Patrick Murguía
- Music by: Santiago Ojeda
- Production companies: Grupo CIE; Bandidos Films; Instituto Mexicano de Cinematografía
- Distributed by: 20th Century Fox
- Release date: March 17, 2006
- Running time: 118 minutes
- Country: Mexico
- Language: Spanish

Un mundo maravilloso ("A Wonderful World") is a 2006 Mexican satirical black comedy film produced by Bandidos Films, directed by Luis Estrada and considered a "spiritual sequel" to La ley de Herodes; it is a political satire about Vicente Fox Quesada's government and its neo-liberal doctrine.

Unlike La ley de Herodes, this film was released without interference from Fox's government, and it even was partly sponsored by Imcine.

The film's spiritual successor, El Infierno was released on September 3, 2010, to coincide with the 200th anniversary of Mexican independence.

Another "spiritual sequel", La dictadura perfecta, was released on October 16, 2014.

== Plot ==
A speech at the World Bank conference congratulates Mexico's poverty alleviation efforts and asserts the problem is eradicated.

Juan Pérez is a humble homeless man in love with a woman of equal economic position named Rosita, to whom he promises to give her a better life by giving her what he could not have: a car, a house and a family.

One particular rainy night, he is looking for a place to sleep. He finds a rich couple's home and peers into the window. He sneaks into the back door of the World Financial Center, a posh office building, and finds an unlocked office where he intends to spend the night.

Suddenly, he hears the cleaner entering the office. Nowhere to go, he crawls out of the window and stands on a platform outside, unbeknownst to the cleaner. The cleaner closes the window and he is locked outside. A large crowd amasses outside the building, where everyone thinks that he wants to commit suicide. He is saved by the firefighters, and then surrounded by journalists asking him his motives and if his opinion on topics such as globalization and neoliberal economic policy influenced his decision.

The newspaper El Mercurio seeks to exploit this situation to replace the boring news cycle in their morning issue. They publish that it is a suicide attempt to protest against poverty, so that the State does something about it, resulting in the Secretary of Economy being responsible. He decides to look for Juan and offer him generous bribes and compensation to silence him.

His friends encourage him to repeat the attempt to obtain an even bigger bribe, and he actually falls off a building, creating a media sensation. He narrowly survives, and is sent to a world class hospital/rehabilitation clinic with many amenities. The government foots the bill, and invites Pérez to a press conference where he can explain his real motives. He denies that the government bribed him to change his story.

Juan Pérez marries Rosita and moves into a beautiful suburban household. His friends come and visit him, expecting to be able to live together. After being rejected, they leave the house in anger. They try copycat attempts, but are not met with the same attention.

The Secretary complains that so many poor people demanding money and help will bankrupt the country. In a dramatic reversal, they arrest him on petty charges and get all of his friends, all the journalists and the hospital staff to testify against him. He is sentenced to three years of prison, during which Rosita cannot see or contact him.

After his release from prison, he finds his house decrepit and abandoned, and Rosita has been presumed dead by her family. The railroad tunnel where he and his homeless friends used to live has been boarded up. He limps to the same rich couple's home (from the beginning of the film) and they give him food. Eventually he reunites and reconciles with his old friends, who reveal that Rosita is alive and living with her son.

They decide to start a socialist revolution and walk down Paseo de la Reforma with a red flag. They try to jump the fence at one of the Secretary's many houses and are chased away by security.

The Secretary wins the Nobel Prize for Economics. Juan Pérez and his family host a luxurious dinner for his friends in a seemingly spacious house. The camera pans outside revealing it is the rich couple's home, with their bodies strewn on the grass.

== Cast ==
- Damián Alcázar .... Juan Pérez
- Cecilia Suárez .... Rosita
- Ernesto Gómez Cruz .... Compadre Filemón
- Jesús Ochoa .... El Tamal
- Silverio Palacios .... El Azteca
- Antonio Serrano .... Secretary of Economy
- Jorge Zárate .... Private Secretary
- José María Yazpik .... Financial Advisor
- Plutarco Haza .... Political Advisor
- Raúl Méndez .... Image Advisor
- Pedro Armendáriz Jr. .... Director of the newspaper "El Mercurio"
- Carmen Beato .... The Girl
- Guillermo Gil .... Rat Faced Dad
- Diego Jáuregui .... Editor in chief
- Carlos Arau .... The young Reporter
- Rodrigo Murray .... Papá Ejemplar
- Alex Cox .... Master of ceremonies
- Cecilia Tijerina .... Mamá Ejemplar
