= Herod's Law =

1999 film by Luis Estrada

- DVD cover
- Directed by: Luis Estrada
- Screenplay by: Luis Estrada; Jaime Sampietro; Fernando León; Vicente Leñero
- Produced by: Luis Estrada
- Starring: Damián Alcázar; Pedro Armendáriz Jr.; Delia Casanova; Juan Carlos Colombo; Alex Cox
- Cinematography: Norman Christianson
- Edited by: Luis Estrada
- Music by: Santiago Ojeda
- Production company: Bandidos Films
- Distributed by: Artecinema, Venevision International
- Release date: November 9, 1999
- Running time: 120 minutes
- Country: Mexico
- Language: Spanish

Herod's Law (original Spanish title La ley de Herodes) is a 1999 Mexican satirical black comedy political film, directed by Luis Estrada and produced by Bandidos Films. The film is a caricature of corruption in Mexico and the long-ruling PRI party. Notably, it was the first Mexican film to criticize the PRI explicitly by name, which sparked controversy and led to interference from the Mexican government because of it.

It is the first in a series of films directed by Estrada and starring Damián Alcázar satirizing different facets of the Mexican government and civil society - subsequent films include A Wonderful World (2006), Hell (2010), The Perfect Dictatorship (2014), and ¡Que viva México! (2023). Alcázar plays a different main character in each movie and the films are not narratively connected.

The film won the Ariel Award for Best Picture from the Mexican Academy of Film. It was also awarded the Special Jury Prize in Latin American Cinema at the Sundance Film Festival.

== Plot ==
A man in an office anxiously fills bags with money before fleeing into the night. An angry peasant mob catches him, and decapitates him.

The man is revealed to have been the mayor (presidente municipal) of a town called San Pedro de los Saguaros. State Governor Sánchez of the PRI orders his Secretary López to find a replacement to prevent criticism nearing the 1952 general elections. López gives the task to his subordinate Ramírez, who proposes Juan Vargas, the naïve head of a landfill, for the job.

Vargas happily accepts, seeing it as the beginning of a promising political career. He and his wife Gloria are quickly disappointed when they arrive at San Pedro, an impoverished hamlet inhabited by illiterate native peasants, most of whom do not even speak Spanish.

Assisted by his secretary Carlos Pek, Vargas spends the next days learning about the town, past mayors' corruption, and meeting the notables, which include Doña Lupe, madam of the town brothel, greedy priest Pérez and Doctor Morales, an educated man and a member of the opposition PAN.

Vargas goes to the state capital to ask López for more funding. On the way his car breaks down and he is helped by an American, Robert Smith, giving him a fake name and address to avoid paying. López instead gives him a copy of the Mexican Constitution and a revolver so he can make money.

Vargas begins studying the Constitution, finding many ways to collect fines and taxes to punish corruption. He tries to have the brothel closed, but Doña Lupe confronts him with a cleaver, prompting Vargas to shoot her in the leg before running away. Later she offers him a large sum of money if he can ignore her illegal business. He pockets it, marking the beginning of his descent into corruption.

Vargas indulges in his newfound power and wealth. He finds ever more crafty ways to alter the law to his benefit, imposing draconian taxes. He introduces Robert, who had come to the town looking for his money, as an American engineer tasked with implementing electricity in the town and lodges him at his home. Doña Lupe, fed up at Vargas's demands for money and his indulging freely of her girls' services, hires a bouncer who severely beats him up. Later that night, Vargas ambushes the bouncer and Doña Lupe, killing them and dumping their bodies in a ravine, inadvertently leaving his PRI pin at the scene of the crime.

In the morning, he finds his pin is missing and, in a panic, orders Pek to conduct an investigation in order to buy time. He decides to frame Filemón, the town drunkard, as the murderer, and Doctor Morales as the mastermind. While "transporting" Filemón to jail, he discovers the drunkard had found his pin at the ravine. He instead kills him and leaves him on the side of the road.

Returning to the town, he finds his wife cheating on him with Smith, prompting him to beat her and chain her up in their house. A disgruntled Pek denounces him as "the worst municipal president the town has ever had". López arrives in the town, having fled into the countryside after having orchestrated a failed attempt on a political rival's life, and demands Vargas give him the money he has made.

While trying to get the money at his house, he finds his wife had escaped and eloped with Smith, taking all the money with her. His sanity shattered, a rambling Vargas kills López and his henchman Tiburón, before confronting a mob of angry townsfolk led by Father Pérez and Pek. He is nearly lynched but is saved by the intervention of government officials on a manhunt for López.

The film ends with Vargas having become Federal Deputy, presenting himself as the one who brought justice to the corrupt López. Ramírez has become administrator at the landfill Vargas used to work at, and a newly appointed mayor arrives at San Pedro de los Saguaros, mirroring the exact way Vargas and his wife arrived at the town at the beginning of the story.

== Cast ==
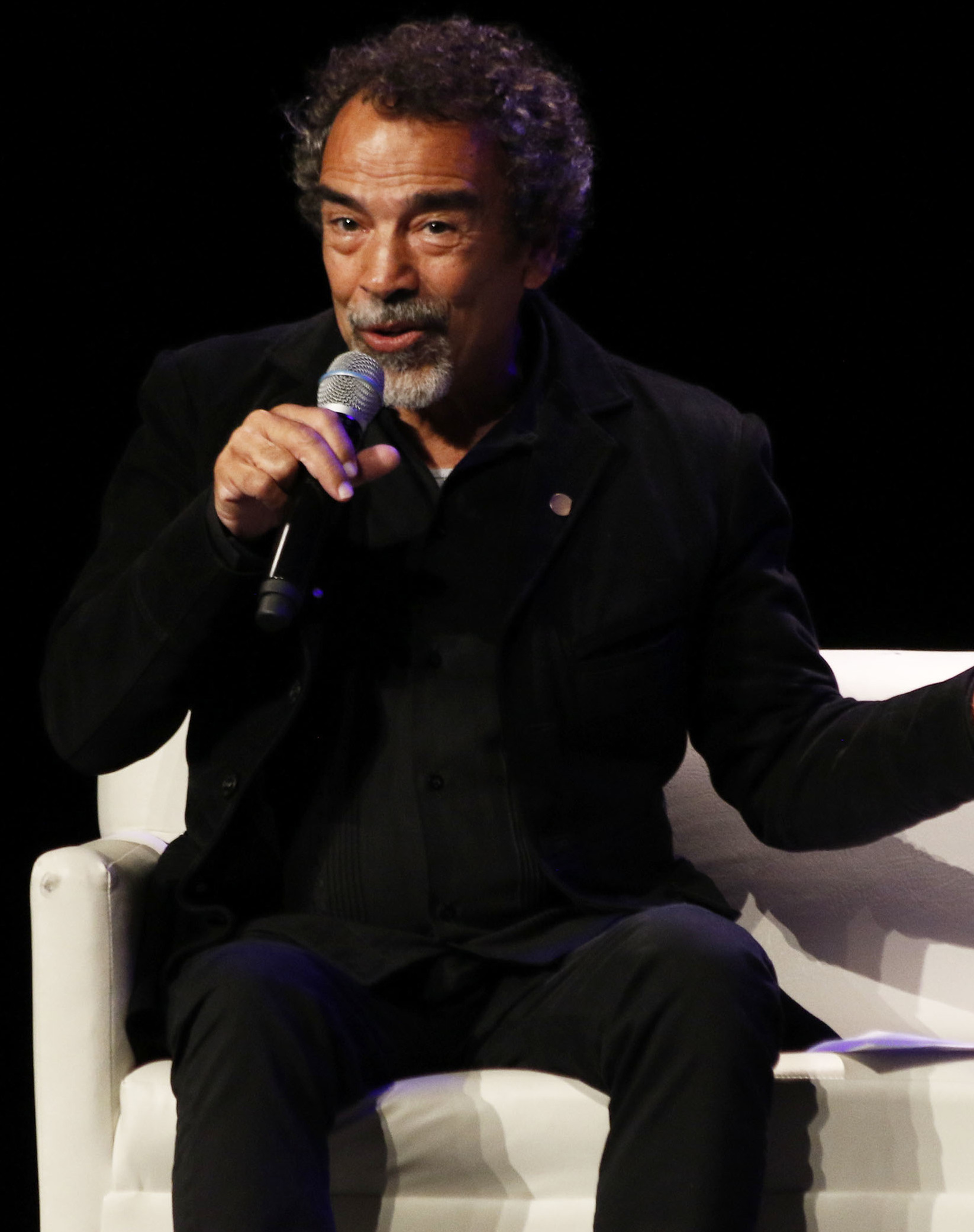
Alcázar in 2019

- Damián Alcázar as Juan Vargas, A dimwitted and sincere man who gradually transformed into a ruthless dictator
- Pedro Armendáriz Jr. as López, Secretary of the Governor and former boss of Vargas
- Juan Carlos Colombo as the assistant to López
- Alex Cox as Robert Smith, the American who helped Vargas with his car troubles
- Leticia Huijara as Gloria, the former wife of Vargas
- Isela Vega as Doña Lupe, the owner of the brothel
- Salvador Sánchez as Carlos Pek, Vargas's secretary
- Manuel Ojeda as Bartender
- Ernesto Gómez Cruz as The Governor
- Eduardo López Rojas as Doctor Morales
- Delia Casanova as Morales' wife
- Jorge Zárate as Tiburón
- Luis de Icaza as Alcalde Alfredo

== Release ==
The film was not well received by the Mexican film distribution authorities, because at the time of release the country was still under the rule of the Institutional Revolutionary Party (PRI) and the 2000 Mexican general election was approaching. However, strong pressure from the public—eager to see an uncensored film with political content—and from several print media outlets that dared to denounce the blockade to which it was subjected, finally led to its release.

The logo of the Institutional Revolutionary Party

== Critical reception ==
It can be considered one of the great Mexican films of the last forty years, not only for its quality, its ironic and biting humor, but also for having influenced many voters. Following its release, for the first time since 1929, the PRI went on to lose the presidential election and Mexican voters elected opposition candidate Vicente Fox.

On review aggregate website Rotten Tomatoes, Herod's Law has an approval rating of 68% based on 25 reviews. The site's critics consensus reads, "La Ley de Herodes is a biting - if heavy-handed - political satire about greed and corruption in Mexico, featuring a brilliant performance from Damián Alcázar." Metacritic, which uses a weighted average, assigned the film a score of 64 out of 100, based on 11 critics, indicating "generally favorable" reviews.

Roger Ebert gave the film 2 out of 4 stars, citing the film's lack of subtly in its messaging, and complexity in characters as its downfall.

This film ranks 51st on the list of the 100 best Mexican films, according to the opinion of 27 film critics and specialists in Mexico, published by the Sector Cine website in June 2020.

== Home media ==
This movie was released in Region 1 by 20th Century Fox and Venevision Intl. under the banner Cinema Latino in 2004. This edition has since gone out of print.

A second edition was released in 2006 by Warner Home Video with Fernando Sariñana's Todo el poder.

A third edition was released as a dual region issue for Region 1 and Region 4 by Videomax in 2007.

The film was added to Netflix on July 16, 2021.
