= Highway Patrolman (film) =

El patrullero
- English-language film poster
- Directed by: Alex Cox
- Written by: Lorenzo O'Brien
- Produced by: Lorenzo O'Brien
- Starring: Roberto Sosa
- Cinematography: Miguel Garzon
- Edited by: Carlos Puente
- Music by: Del Zamora
- Release date: 1991
- Running time: 104 minutes
- Countries: Mexico; Japan
- Language: Spanish
- Budget: $1.5 million

Highway Patrolman (Spanish: El patrullero) is a 1991 Mexican crime drama film by the British director Alex Cox. It was produced by Lorenzo O'Brien, who also wrote the screenplay, and stars Roberto Sosa, Bruno Bichir, Zaide Silvia Gutiérrez and Vanessa Bauche. The cinematography is by Miguel Garzon and the production designer was Cecilia Montiel, who went on to work on The Mask of Zorro as well as on Cox's Alan Smithee film The Winner.

Cox considers El Patrullero to be his best work while a number of prominent film critics have expressed the same opinion as well.

== Plot ==
The film tells the story of a young man, Pedro Rojas (Roberto Sosa) starting his career as a Highway Patrolman in the rural north. He refuses to take part in the corruption in the police force, unlike his friend Anibal Guerrero (Bruno Bichir) who quickly starts taking bribes and peddling contraband.

Gradually, Pedro's high principles are eroded by the hardships of his life. Eventually he takes his first bribe. He is shot in the leg, nagged by his father's ghost and beats up the governor's son. His wife Griselda (Zaide Silvia Gutiérrez), tolerates his relationship with a prostitute, Maribel (Vanessa Bauche), provided it doesn't reflect badly on herself and the money keeps coming in. When Anibal is murdered by drug dealers, Pedro's moral sense re-emerges and he takes revenge. The film ends with Pedro resigning from the Highway Patrol, trying to maintain two families.

== Reception ==
Though the film premiered in Mexico in 1991, U.S. distribution was considerably limited. Kevin Thomas of The Los Angeles Times wrote over two years later that it was "a sad commentary on the state of foreign-language film distribution that Highway Patrolman...is only now being released [in Los Angeles]." Nevertheless, he adds that "we can be only be grateful that it has arrived at last" as he considered the film to be "maverick director Alex Cox’s finest film to date." Thomas observed that "working in a foreign language has given Cox the necessary freedom and detachment not to worry about being hip and to take the plunge into classic screen storytelling, backed by O’Brien’s superbly structured script."

Jonathan Rosenbaum of The Chicago Reader concurred that "in some ways it’s [Cox's] best work to date – a beautifully realized tale about the life of a Mexican highway patrolman who’s neither sentimentalized nor treated like a villain." He later included it in his year-end top-ten list, observing that "working in a virtuoso long-take style, Cox mixes comedy with tragedy and social critique with straight-ahead action." Jim Hoberman would also hail it as "Cox’s most impressive comeback" many years later in a retrospective review published in The New York Times. On the review aggregator website Rotten Tomatoes, 100% of 6 critics' reviews are positive.

== Influence and legacy ==
The musician James Rutledge released his early music under the name Pedro in reference to the film. Damián Alcázar, who had a small role in the film would go on to star in the Luis Estrada films Herod's Law (1999) and Un mundo maravilloso (2006), which have Cox in supporting roles.

== Year-end lists ==
- 5th – Georgia Brown, The Village Voice
- 8th – Jonathan Rosenbaum, Chicago Reader
- Honorable mention – David Elliott, The San Diego Union-Tribune
