= Pastorela (film) =

- Theatrical release poster
- Directed by: Emilio Portes
- Written by: Emilio Portes
- Produced by: Alejandro García
- Starring: Joaquín Cosío; Eduardo España; Carlos Cobos; Ana Serradilla
- Cinematography: Damian Garcia
- Distributed by: Las Producciones del Patrón; Fidecine; EFICINE 226; IMCINE
- Release date: 2011
- Running time: 90 minutes
- Country: Mexico
- Language: Spanish

Pastorela is a 2011 Mexican Christmas black comedy film directed by Emilio Portes and starring Joaquín Cosío, Eduardo España, Carlos Cobos and Ana Serradilla. It won the Ariel Award for Best Picture in 2012.

== Premise ==
The judicial agent of the federal police Jesús "Chucho" Juárez lives with his daughter Magdalena in the neighborhood of de San Miguel de Nenepilco, Mexico City, and annually plays the role of the devil in the parish pastorela organized by father Benito. When the deputy prosecutor is assassinated, Chucho gets occupied with the case and does not realize that father Benito has died of a heart attack while having sex with one of the nuns; and that the new priest, Edmundo Posadas, has decided not to include him in the pastorela, instead giving his role to Vulmaro, Chucho's compadre. After years of playing the devil, Chucho is not going to give up his role easily, so he will have to face off in a classic fight of good versus evil to claim his part in the play.

== Cast ==
- Joaquín Cosío as Jesús "Chucho" Juárez
- Carlos Cobos as priest Edmundo Posadas
- Eduardo España as Vilmaro "El Compadre" Villafuente
- Ana Serradilla as a nun
- Dagoberto Gama as a judicial commander
- Héctor Jiménez as a possessed man
- José Semafi — as "El Tuerto"
- Ernesto Yáñez as an altar boy
- Eduardo Manzano as a Cardinal
- Ruben Cristiany as the Archbishop of the Archdiocese of Mexico
- Osami Kowano as priest Benito
- Melissa Bahnsen as Magdalena
- Silverio Palacios as doctor Godínez

== Awards and nominations ==
Pastorela received a total of 14 nominations for the Ariel Awards, and won eight of these.

Award	Year	Category	Receiver	Result
Ariel Awards	2012	Best Film	Emilio Portes and Producciones el Patrón	Won
Ariel Awards	2012	Best Male Co-Acting	Carlos Cobos	Won
Ariel Awards	2012	Best Cinematographic Screenplay	Emilio Portes	Won
Ariel Awards	2012	Best Cinematographic Screenplay	Emilio Portes	Won
Ariel Awards	2012	Best Costume	Gabriela Fernández	Won
Ariel Awards	2012	Best Makeup	Roberto Ortiz and Felipe de Jesús Salazar	Won
Ariel Awards	2012	Best Visual Effects	Gretel Studio	Won
Ariel Awards	2012	Best Direction	Emilio Portes	Won
