= ¡Que viva México! =

¡Que viva México! may refer to:

- ¡Que viva México! (unfinished film), a Soviet film from 1930 directed by Sergei Eisenstein
- ¡Que viva México! (2023 film), a Mexican comedy political satire film directed by Luis Estrada
