= Pedro Armendáriz Jr. =

Mexican actor (1940–2011)

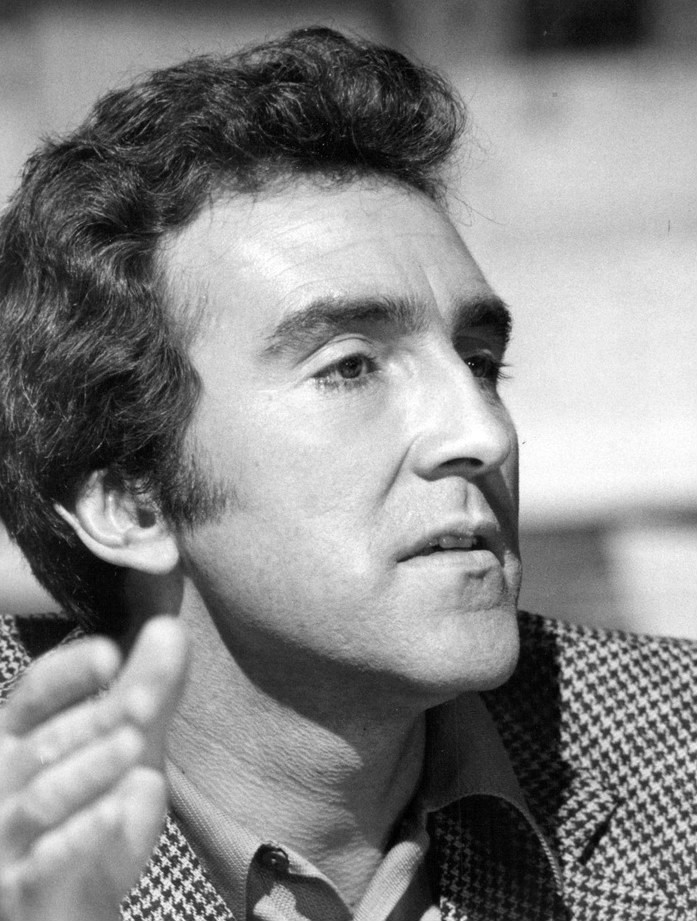
- Armendáriz in 1973
- Born: Pedro Armendáriz Bohr; April 6, 1940; Mexico City, Mexico
- Died: December 26, 2011 (aged 71); New York City, New York, U.S.
- Resting place: Panteón Jardín Cemetery, Mexico City, Mexico
- Education: Universidad Iberoamericana
- Occupation: Actor
- Years active: 1965–2011
- Spouses: Lucía Gómez de Parada (m. 1962; div. 1980) Ofelia Medina (m. 1981; div. 1996)
- Partner: Luz María Jerez (1999-onwards)
- Children: 4
- Father: Pedro Armendáriz

Pedro Armendáriz Bohr (April 6, 1940 – December 26, 2011) was a Mexican actor. The son of actor Pedro Armendáriz, he had an extensive career in both Mexican and American films, appearing in over 200 productions between the 1960s and the 2010s. He was a two-time Ariel Award winner, Best Actor for Mina, Wind of Freedom (1977) and Best Supporting Actor for Herod's Law (1999).

== Early life and education ==
Armendáriz was born in Mexico City to Mexican-American actor Pedro Armendáriz and actress Carmelita Bohr (known professionally as 'Carmelita Pardo'). He initially had no interest in acting, and studied architecture at the Universidad Iberoamericana. He assisted Pedro Ramírez Vázquez in constructing the National Museum of Anthropology. Unable to find work thereafter, he took up acting at the encouragement of his friend, director Arturo Ripstein.

== Career ==
Armendáriz established himself working with Mexican directors Julián Pastor, Jaime Humberto Hermosillo, and Arturo Ripstein. He won two Ariel Awards (out of seven total nominations), Best Actor for Mina, Wind of Freedom (1977) and Best Supporting Actor for Herod's Law (1999).

Thanks to his bilingualism, he appeared in many Hollywood productions like the John Wayne Westerns The Undefeated (1969) and Chisum (1970), The Magnificent Seven Ride! (1972), the disaster film Earthquake (1974), and The Dogs of War (1980). He also became a fixture on American television during the 1970s and 1980s.

Armendáriz appeared in the James Bond film, Licence to Kill, as President Hector Lopez. His father had been in the earlier James Bond film From Russia with Love. He also appeared in Old Gringo (1989), Amistad (1997), The Mask of Zorro (1998), Before Night Falls (2000), The Mexican (2001), Original Sin (2001), In the Time of the Butterflies (2001), The Crime of Padre Amaro (2002), Once Upon a Time in Mexico (2003), And Starring Pancho Villa as Himself (2003), The Legend of Zorro (2005), Freelancers (2012), and Casa de mi padre (2012). He worked with director Alex Cox on Walker (1987) and Death and the Compass (1996).

Armendáriz was also active in dubbing, and served as a President of the Academia Mexicana de Artes y Ciencias Cinematográficas.

== Personal life ==
Armendáriz was married model Lucía Gómez de Parada. The couple divorced in 1980, and Armendáriz re-married to actress Ofelia Medina the following year. They divorced in 1996. Beginning in 1999, Armendáriz was in a long-term relationship with Luz María Jerez. He had four children.

=== Illness and death ===
In November 2011, Armendáriz was diagnosed with eye cancer. He died on December 26, 2011, at age 71, at Memorial Sloan Kettering Cancer Center in New York City. He became the first Mexican actor to be memorialized with the dimming of Broadway's marquee lights that night. His remains were buried at Panteón Jardín in Mexico City, alongside his father.

== Filmography ==
=== Film ===
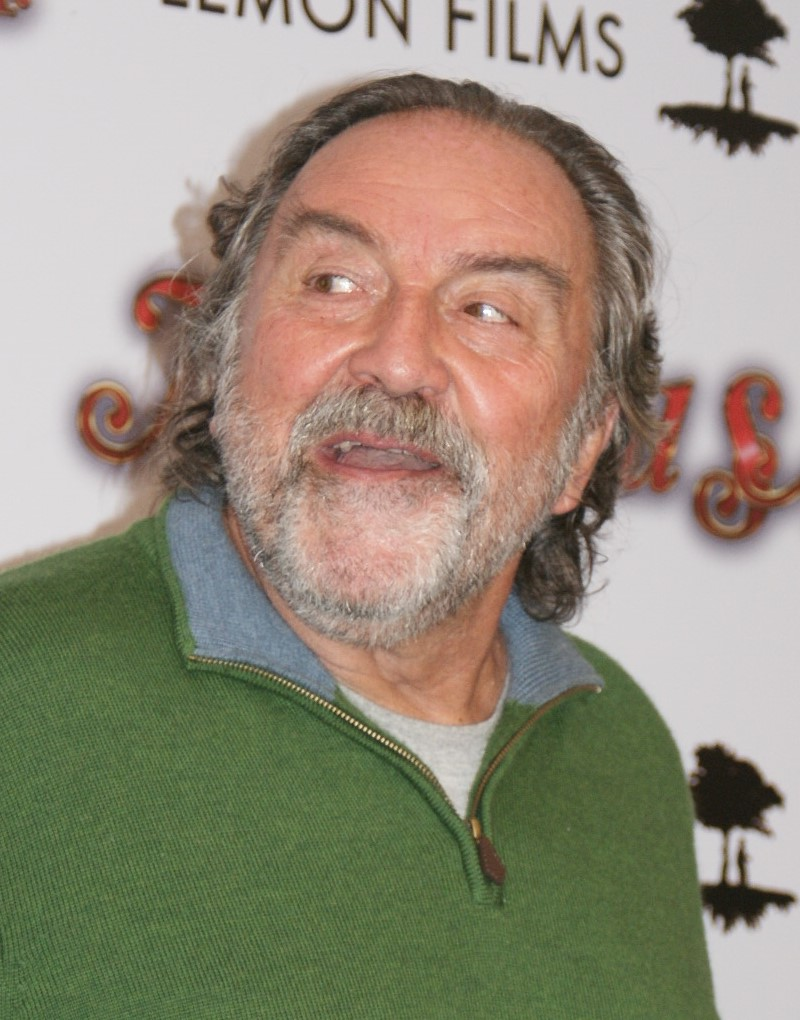
Armendáriz in 2008

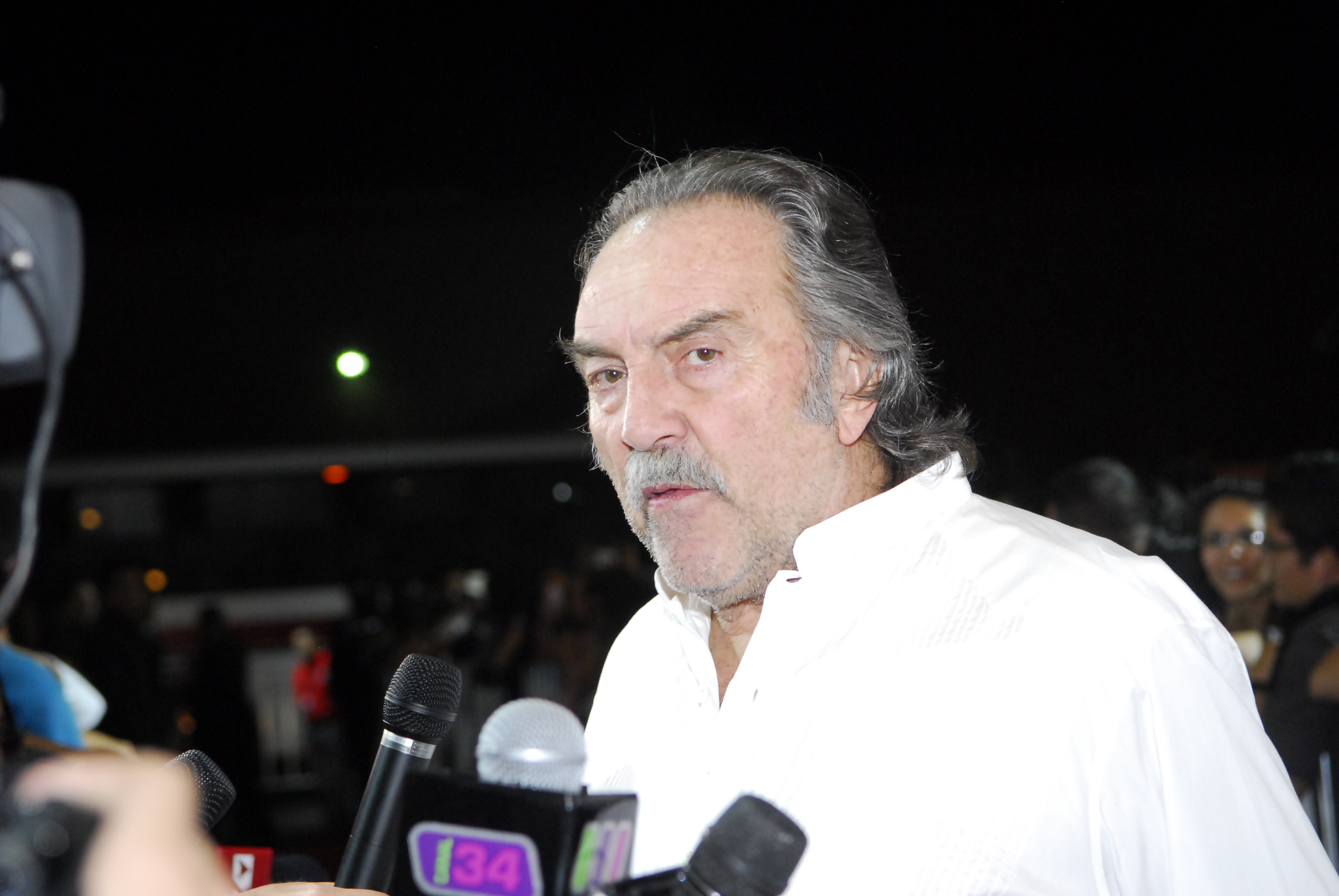
Armendáriz in 2010

- Fuera de la ley (1966) as Willy
- El Cachorro (1966)
- Los Gavilanes negros (1966)
- El Temerario (1966)
- Matar es fácil (1966) as Gustavo de la Rosa
- Los Tres mosqueteros de Dios (1967) as Manuel
- La Soldadera (1967) as Isidro
- Los Bandidos (1967) as Priest
- Guns for San Sebastian (1968) as Father Lucas
- 4 contra el crimen (1969) as Gustavo
- Amor perdoname (1968)
- No hay cruces en el mar (1968) as Sergio
- El Corrido de 'el hijo desobediente' (1968) as Ramiro
- Los Asesinos (1968) as Talbot
- Las Luchadoras contra el robot asesino (1969)
- El Golfo (1969)
- Todo por nada (1969) as Pedro
- Las Vampiras (1969) as Carlos Mayer
- Los Recuerdos del porvenir(1969) as Capitán Flores
- La Marcha de Zacatecas (1969) as Mayor González
- Super Colt 38 (1969) as Morton
- The Undefeated (1969) as Escalante
- Patsy, mi amor (1969)
- Las Impuras (1969)
- Como enfriar a mi marido (1970)
- The Phantom Gunslinger (1970) as Algernon
- Chisum (1970) as Ben
- Los Juniors (1970) as Rafael Segura Jr.
- Macho Callahan (1970) as Juan
- Su precio... unos dólares (1970) as Sam
- La Belleza (1970)
- River of Gold (1971) as Angel
- Vuelo 701 (1971) as Máximo
- Una Vez, un hombre (1971) as Suarez
- Siete muertes para el texano (1971)
- Primero el dólar (1972)
- Killer by Night (1972) as Carlos Madera
- Hardcase (1972) as Simon Fergus
- Ni solteros, ni casados (1972)
- Sucedió en Jalisco (1972) as Muñoz
- Trio y cuarteto (1972) (segment "Cuarteto")
- The Magnificent Seven Ride! (1972) as Pepe Carral
- Indio (1972) as Jesse James
- Los Indomables (1972)
- The Soul of Nigger Charley (1973) as Sandoval
- Don't Be Afraid of the Dark (1973) as Francisco Perez
- The Deadly Trackers (1973) as Herrero
- Cinco mil dolares de recompensa (1974) as William Law
- Chosen Survivors (1974) as Luis Cabral
- Las Viboras cambian de piel (1974) as Esposo abandonado
- Traiganlos vivos o muertos (1974)
- Earthquake (1974) as Emilio Chavez
- Cabalgando a la luna (1974)
- The Log of the Black Pearl (1975) as Archie Hector
- Los Caciques (1975) as Arrieta
- A Home of Our Own (1975) as police captain
- Más negro que la noche (1975) as Roberto
- Un Mulato llamado Martín (1975)
- Columbo: A Matter of Honor(1976) as Commandante Sanchez
- La Gran Aventura Del Zorro (1976) as Emilio Walter
- El Pacto (1976) as Raul
- La Pasión según Berenice (1976) as Rodrigo Robles
- Longitud de guerra (1976)
- Mina, viento de libertad (1977)
- The Divine Caste (1977) as Abel Ortiz Argumedo
- Carroña (1978) as El Rengo
- La Plaza de Puerto Santo (1978) as Ernesto
- Los Pequeños privilegios (1978) as Pedro
- El Complot mongol (1978) as Filiberto
- El Hijo es mio (1978)
- Crónica íntima (1979)
- Survival Run (1979) as Paco
- Cadena perpetua (1979) as Javier Lira
- Estas ruinas que ves (1979) as Raymundo Rocafuerte
- El Vuelo de la cigüeña (1979)
- La Ilegal (1979) as Felipe Leyva
- Me olvidé de vivir (1980) as Pedro
- Mamá solita (1980)
- The Dogs of War (1980) as Captain
- Ni solteros, ni cazados (1980)
- Evita Peron (1981) as Cypriano Reyes
- Novia, Esposa y Amante(1981) as Esteban Ampudia
- La Mujer del ministro (1981) as Inspector Romero
- Rastro de muerte (1981) as Alberto Villamosa
- La Chèvre (1981) as captain
- En el pais de los pies ligeros (1982)
- Dias de combate (1982) as Hector Belascoaran Shayne
- Huevos rancheros (1982)
- Cosa facil (1982) as Hector Belascoaran Shayne
- El Dia que Murio Pedro Infante (1982)
- Las Musiqueras (1983) as Alejandro del Río
- Los Dos carnales (1983) as Don Cristóbal
- Chile picante (1983)
- El Corazon de la noche (1984) as Domingo
- La Silla vacia (1984)
- Extraño matrimonio (1984)
- El Billetero (1984)
- Matar o morir (1984) as Tony Collins
- Secuestro sangriento (1985)
- Sangre en el Caribe (1985) as Mario
- The Treasure of the Amazon (1985) as Pablo / Zapata
- Historias violentas (1985) (segment 3 "Reflejos")
- Vidas errantes (1985) as El ingeniero
- Treasure Island (1985) as Mendoza
- Maine-Ocean Express (1986) as Pedro De La Moccorra
- Murder in Three Acts (1986) as Mateo
- El Tres de copas (1986)
- El Puente II (1986)
- Persecución en Las Vegas: "Volvere" (1987) as Pagano
- Walker (1987) as Munoz
- Mariana, Mariana (1987) as adult Carlos
- Herencia maldita (1987)
- A Walk on the Moon (1987) as Doctor
- Les Pyramides bleues (1988) as Perez-Valdez
- Lovers, Partners & Spies (1988) as Duke
- El Secreto de Romelia (1988) as Roman
- El Placer de la venganza (1988)
- Diana, René, y El Tíbiri (1988)
- Ke arteko egunak (1989)
- El Costo de la vida (1989)
- Licence to Kill (1989) as President Hector Lopez
- Old Gringo (1989) as Pancho Villa
- La secta del sargon (1990)
- ¡Maten a Chinto! (1990) as Don Chinto
- La Leyenda de una mascara (1991) as López
- Camino largo a Tijuana (1991) as Juan
- Bandidos (1991) as priest
- El Patrullero (1991) as Sargento Barreras
- Diplomatic Immunity (1991) as Oswaldo Delgado
- Corrupción y placer (1991) as Augusto Alarcon
- Sonata de luna (1992)
- Death and the Compass (1992) as Blot
- Los Años de Greta (1992) as Gustavo
- Extraños caminos (1993)
- Nurses on the Line: The Crash of Flight 7 (1993)
- Tombstone (1993) as priest
- Code... Death: Frontera Sur (1993) as Dragon
- Dos crimenes (1994) as Alfonso
- The Cisco Kid (1994) as General Montano
- Vagabunda (1994) as Pedro Riel
- Novia que te vea (1994)
- Guerrero negro (1994)
- Ámbar (1994) as Commissioner
- Una Luz en la escalera (1994) as Captain Fonseca
- Et Hjørne af paradis (1997) as minister
- De noche vienes, Esmeralda (1997) as Antonio Rossellini
- Reclusorio (1997) as Abogado defensor (segment "Sangre entre mujeres")
- Amistad (1997) as General Espartero
- The Mask of Zorro (1998) as Don Pedro
- Fuera de la ley (1998)
- On the Border (1998) as Herman
- Al borde (1998) as Don Gabino
- La Secta del sargon (1999)
- La Ley de Herodes (1999) as Lopez
- Before Night Falls (2000) as Reynaldo's grandfather
- El Grito (2000) as Duarte
- The Mexican (2001) as Mexican policeman
- Su alteza serenísima (2001) as His most serene highness
- Serafín: La película (2001) as Thinker (voice)
- Original Sin (2001) as Jorge Cortes
- Asesinato en el Meneo (2001) as Don Manuel
- In the Time of the Butterflies (2001) as captain Peña
- Entre los dioses del desprecio (2001)
- El crimen del padre Amaro (2002) as Presidente Municipal Gordo
- Once Upon a Time in Mexico (2003) as President of Mexico
- Casa de los Babys (2003) as Ernesto
- And Starring Pancho Villa as Himself (2003) as Don Luis Terrazas
- El Segundo (2004) as El Mayor
- Matando Cabos (2004) as Oscar Cabos
- The Legend of Zorro (2005) as Governor Riley
- Después de la muerte (2005) as Don Julio
- Un mundo maravilloso (2006) as Director del Periódico
- Guadalupe (2006) as Simon
- One Long Night (2007) as Don Ricardo
- El Ultimo justo (2007) as Father del Toro
- Looking for Palladin (2008) as police chief
- Divina confusión (2008) as Melesio
- Navidad S.A. (2008) as Santa Claus
- Nikté (2009) as Kaas (voice)
- Sin memoria (2010) as Benitez
- El baile de San Juan (2010) as Marqués de la Villa
- Mamitas (2011) as Ramon 'Tata' Donicio
- El Cartel de los Sapos (2012) as Don Modesto
- Casa de Mi Padre (2012) as Miguel Ernesto
- Freelancers (2012) as Gabriel Baez
- Desde dentro (2016) as Domingo Altamirano (final film role)

=== Television ===
- Honor y orgullo (1969)
- Me llaman Martina Sola (1972)
- Los hermanos coraje (1972)
- Police Story (1973) as Jow Gaitan
- Ven Conmigo (1975) as Eduardo
- Columbo: A Matter of Honor (1976) as Commandante Sanchez
- The Rhinemann Exchange (1977) as Fuentes
- Rosario de amor (1978)
- Julia (1979)
- The Love Boat (1981) as Ricardo
- Remington Steele (1983) as Captain Rios
- Knight Rider (1984) as Eduardo O'Brian
- El Camino Secreto (1986) as Alejandro
- La Gloria y el infierno(1986) as Sebastian Arteaga
- Airwolf (1986) as Captain Mendez
- On Wings of Eagles (1986) as Mr. Dobuti
- Un Nuevo amanecer (1988) as Gerardo
- Nurses on the Line (1993) as Commandante
- Agujetas de color de rosa (1994) as Aarón
- La Ultima esperanza (1995)
- La Sombra del otro (1996)
- La culpa (1996) as Tomás Mendizábal
- La hora marcada (1988)
- Tony Tijuana (1988) as Tony Tijuana
- Sweating Bullets (1991–1992) as Carillo
- Acapulco H.E.A.T. (1993) as Rodriguez
- Serafín (1999) as Thinker
- Laberintos de pasion (1999) as Padre Mateo Valencia
- Cuento de Navidad (1999)
- Tres mujeres (1999) as Federico Mendez
- Furcio (2000–2002) as Host
- Bajo la misma piel (2003) as Joaquín Vidaurri
- Amy, la niña de la mochila azul (2004) as Matias Granados
- Destilando amor (2007) as Thomas
- Atrévete a soñar (2009–2010) as Max Williams
- La fuerza del destino (2011) as Anthony McGuire
