= Camino largo a Tijuana =

1988 Mexican film

- Theatrical release poster
- Directed by: Luis Estrada
- Written by: Aarón Sorice Díaz
- Story by: Brian Stern
- Produced by: Luis Estrada; Emmanuel Lubezki; Alfonso Cuarón
- Starring: Pedro Armendáriz Jr. Ofelia Medina
- Cinematography: Carlos Marcovich
- Edited by: Akie Ozono
- Music by: Santiago Ojeda; Diego Herrera
- Production companies: IMCINE; CONACINE
- Distributed by: IMCINE
- Release date: 28 February 1991 (Mexico)
- Running time: 92 minutes
- Country: Mexico
- Language: Spanish

Camino largo a Tijuana (English: The long way to Tijuana) is a 1988 Mexican drama directed by Luis Estrada in his feature film directorial debut, and starring Pedro Armendáriz Jr. and Ofelia Medina. The film was produced by Estrada, Emmanuel Lubezki and Alfonso Cuarón. The production marked the film debut of Daniel Giménez Cacho.

The film premiered at the Cineteca Nacional on 17 December 1988, but did not receive a theatrical release until 28 February 1991.

== Plot ==
Juan is a 40-year-old man who lives and sells auto parts in a junkyard of abandoned cars. He becomes involved with Lila, a young drug addict who is being hunted by two traffickers seeking to abduct her in exchange for a reward. After rescuing her and killing the traffickers, Juan takes Lila under his protection, helping her through detoxification before the two embark on a long journey to Tijuana.

== Cast ==
- Pedro Armendáriz Jr. as Juan
- Ofelia Medina as Rita
- Carmen Salinas as Nana
- Alfonso Arau as Chino
- Daniel Giménez Cacho as Tubo
- Jaime Keller as Gas
- José Carlos Rodríguez as Fogonero
- Julián Pastor as Dealer
- Patricia Pereyra as Lila
- Abel Woolrich as Paco
- Patricia Rojas as Swimmer

== Production ==
Principal photography on Camino largo a Tijuana began on 18 November 1987.

== Awards and nominations ==
Camino largo a Tijuana was nominated to three Ariel Awards.

Organization	Category/Award	Nominee(s)	Result	Ref
Ariel Awards	Best First Film	Luis Estrada	Nominated	
Ariel Awards	Best Supporting Actress	Patricia Pereyra	Nominated	
Ariel Awards	Best Score	Diego Herrera	Nominated	
