= El Infierno (2010 film) =

- Poster "El Infierno"
- Directed by: Luis Estrada
- Written by: Luis Estrada; Jaime Sampietro
- Produced by: Luis Estrada
- Starring: Damián Alcázar; Joaquín Cosio; Ernesto Gómez Cruz
- Cinematography: Damian Garcia
- Music by: Michael Brook
- Distributed by: Bandidos Films
- Release date: September 3, 2010
- Running time: 146 minutes
- Country: Mexico
- Language: Spanish
- Box office: $6.7 million

El Infierno (English: Hell) is a 2010 Mexican black comedy crime drama film produced by Bandidos Films and directed by Luis Estrada, following the line of La ley de Herodes. A political satire about drug trafficking, organized crime and the Mexican drug war, the film received an NC-17 rating by the MPAA for "some graphic violence and explicit sexual content".

El Infierno enjoyed both critical and commercial success in Mexico and was nominated for the 25th Goya Awards for Best Spanish Language Foreign Film. The film has enjoyed a cult following, primarily by Mexican audiences.

The film's loosely related follow up, La dictadura perfecta (English: The Perfect Dictatorship), was released October 16, 2014, to generally positive reviews.

== Plot ==
The story begins with Benjamin García, nicknamed "Benny" (Damián Alcázar), saying farewell to his mother and younger brother to migrate to the United States. 20 years later, he is deported back to Mexico, where he finds a bleak reality where an economic crisis and a wave of crime and violence hit the country as a result of the war on drugs.

His mother and godfather tell Benny his younger brother was killed under strange circumstances, leaving behind a wife and son. Benny soon meets then is attracted towards his brother's widow, Guadalupe Solís (Elizabeth Cervantes), and promises in front of his brother's grave to help her and his nephew. Some time later, he meets his childhood friend Eufemio "El Cochiloco" Mata (Joaquín Cosío), who has become part of a drug cartel. He learns that Eufemio and his brother worked together in the "Los Reyes del Norte" cartel, going by Pedro "El Diablo" García, but he was killed by the rival cartel "Los Panchos".

Days later, Benny, now in a relationship with Guadalupe, finds himself in trouble after his nephew is arrested for robbery and will only walk free with a bribe of 50,000 pesos (about 4000 USD in 2010). Benny asks Cochiloco for help and joins the cartel, where he meets the boss, Don José Reyes (Ernesto Gómez Cruz) and his son Jesús "El J.R." Reyes. He's accepted into the cartel, not before being reminded about the rules: Honesty, loyalty, and absolute silence. Benny seems content, but after witnessing the torture and killing of "La Cucaracha", a whistleblower for the federal police, he starts to doubt himself in front of the horrors he must commit. Despite this, Guadalupe convinces him to stay, claiming they "could get used to anything except starving".

Benny starts to adapt and progress in the cartel, and becomes wealthy when he and El Cuchiloco save a shipment of drugs from El Texano (Mario Almada) from attack by a rival gang and are rewarded by Don José. Benny brings his mother money and a television as a gift to apologize for his failure to keep his promise from before he left for the US, and she chastises him for following in his brother's footsteps before requesting he give her his watch and buy her a walkman.

As Benny and El Cochiloco continue to work for the cartel, they are arrested and offered a deal by a federal agent - to help the government to capture Don José in exchange for being entered into witness protection. Don José, furious that the police and mayor were unable to prevent the arrest, orders them to go after his brother, the leader of the rival gang Los Panchos. Benny reveals to Guadalupe that he plans to save the money he makes working for Don José and take her and his nephew to live in the United States as soon as he can afford it.

The rival cartel grows stronger and begins a major dispute, for which Los Reyes employ ex-military mercenaries as new members. J.R. divides them in three groups and gives them separate missions.

When he returns home, a worried Gudalupe tells Benny that her son is missing, and Benny goes out to find him. He learns that his nephew is working with Los Panchos and goes to bring him home, warning him of the danger he faces by working with the rival gang and telling him not to end up like his father.

Benny receives a call from Cochiloco saying he's in trouble. Someone had betrayed them and told the rival cartel their location, with J.R. killed in the ambush as he was having sex with two of the mercenaries. Since J.R. was probably hiding his homosexuality from his father, Cochiloco decided to lie to Don José about his death, which causes him to doubt the loyalty of his subordinate. The day of the funeral, Don José looks at Cochiloco with distrust and resentment, who he believes is responsible for his son's death. He orders another one of the mercenaries, "El Sargento," to kill Cochiloco's eldest son. The latter, filled with rage, seeks revenge against Don José, but dies off screen in his attempt.

Don José offers the remaining members a large reward to kill his brother Don Francisco "Pancho" Reyes, his nephews Los Panchos, and whoever gave the location of his son's squad. They slaughter the rival cartel and discover the traitor was a young man from the same town: Benjamin "El Diablito" García, Benny's nephew, but the other members don't recognize him. Angry and nervous, Benny questions his nephew about his reasons, who in tears confesses he did it because he found out it was Los Reyes who killed his father, showing the gold chain he always wore, the one Benny gifted him when he left for the United States.

Benny begins to search for the truth, interrogating his partner "El Huasteco" who reveals the truth at gunpoint: Don José personally tortured and killed Pedro by castrating him for having slept with Don Jose's wife. Between laughs and rage he realizes the other members do know his nephew, and it was a matter of time before they found out about his involvement in the ambush. Benny knocks Huasteco unconscious and ties him up before going back to take his nephew to safety and get him out of the country, sending him on a bus to meet someone who can take him into the US where he is to travel on to Phoenix. Before he can return to town, Benny receives a call from Guadalupe warning him Los Reyes already know what's going on, and Benny urges her to abandon the town. Benny resorts to the federal police to testify against Don José for protection, but all too soon he realizes they're involved with Los Reyes as well. After being tortured he attempts to save himself from being brought to Don José by bribing to policemen to let him escape, offering them money and drugs.

When they arrive at his brother's grave, Benny shows the policemen the bribe, which was hidden in a small niche on the grave. But as they are distracted, Benny takes out a gun to shoot the agents, however, he misses and one of them shoots back. Benny is left for dead and buried in a shallow grave next to his brother's, knowing Don José had ordered them to bring Benny alive for punishment. The morning after, Benny wakes up and gets out of the grave just to find that Guadalupe had been murdered by the cartel. Badly hurt, he decides to get away to recover.

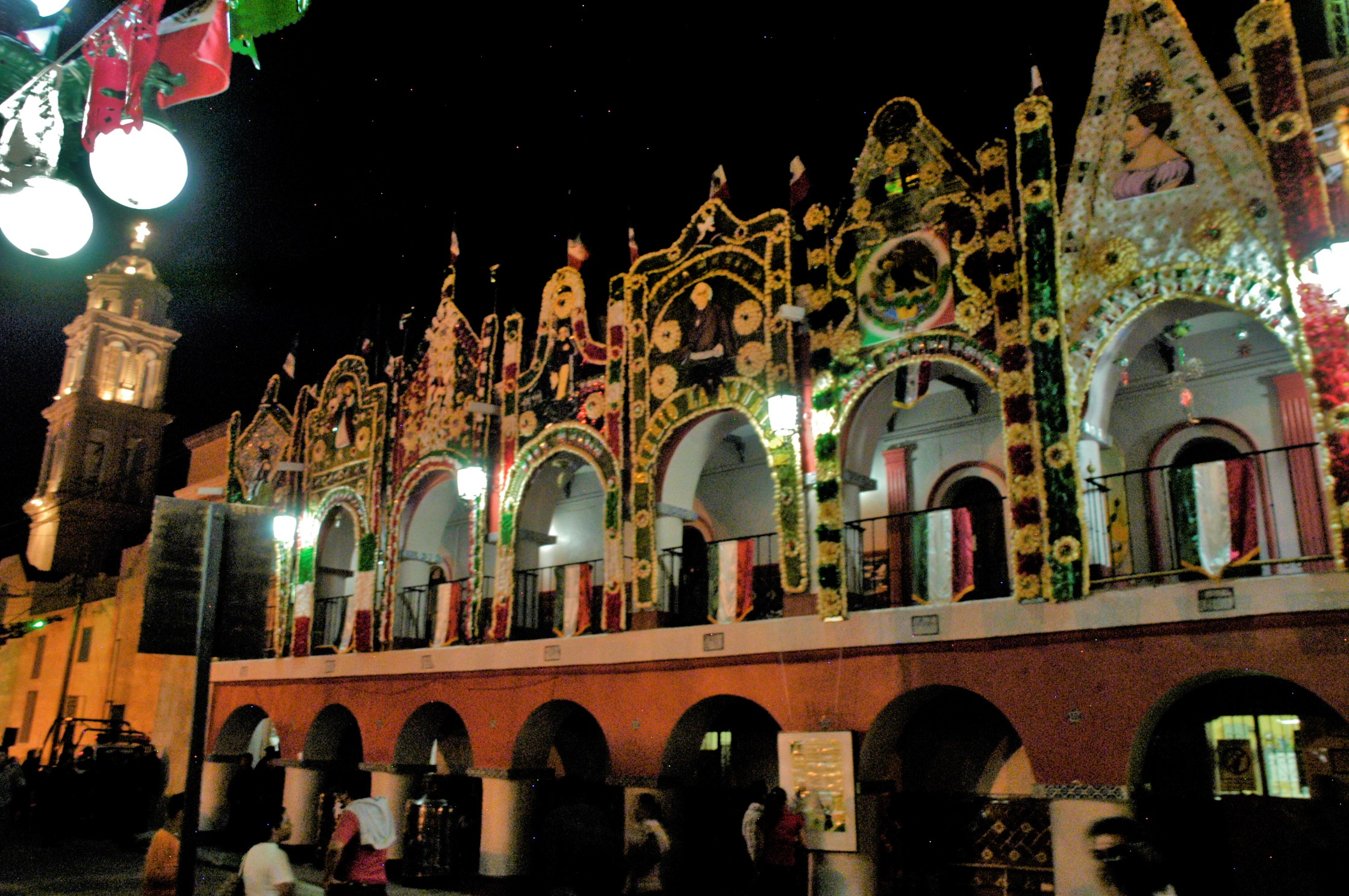
It is a Mexican tradition for the municipal leader to stand at the town square every independence day, wave flags and cry "Long Live Mexico" (along with revolutionary leaders)

Months later, Don José becomes the county governor, and hold a public Independence Day celebration which leaves them exposed. Benny decides to kill off Los Reyes and his family while they are giving the traditional Independence Day Cry to the town, mowing them down with an AK-47, wiping out the cartel.

In the final scene, it is shown that Benny died offscreen. Diablito pays respects in front of Benny's grave with a smile on his face, and leaving in his van to later arrive in a drug warehouse to kill Benny's assassin, Don Francisco's grandson - ensuring the cycle of violence plaguing Mexico will only continue.

== Cast ==
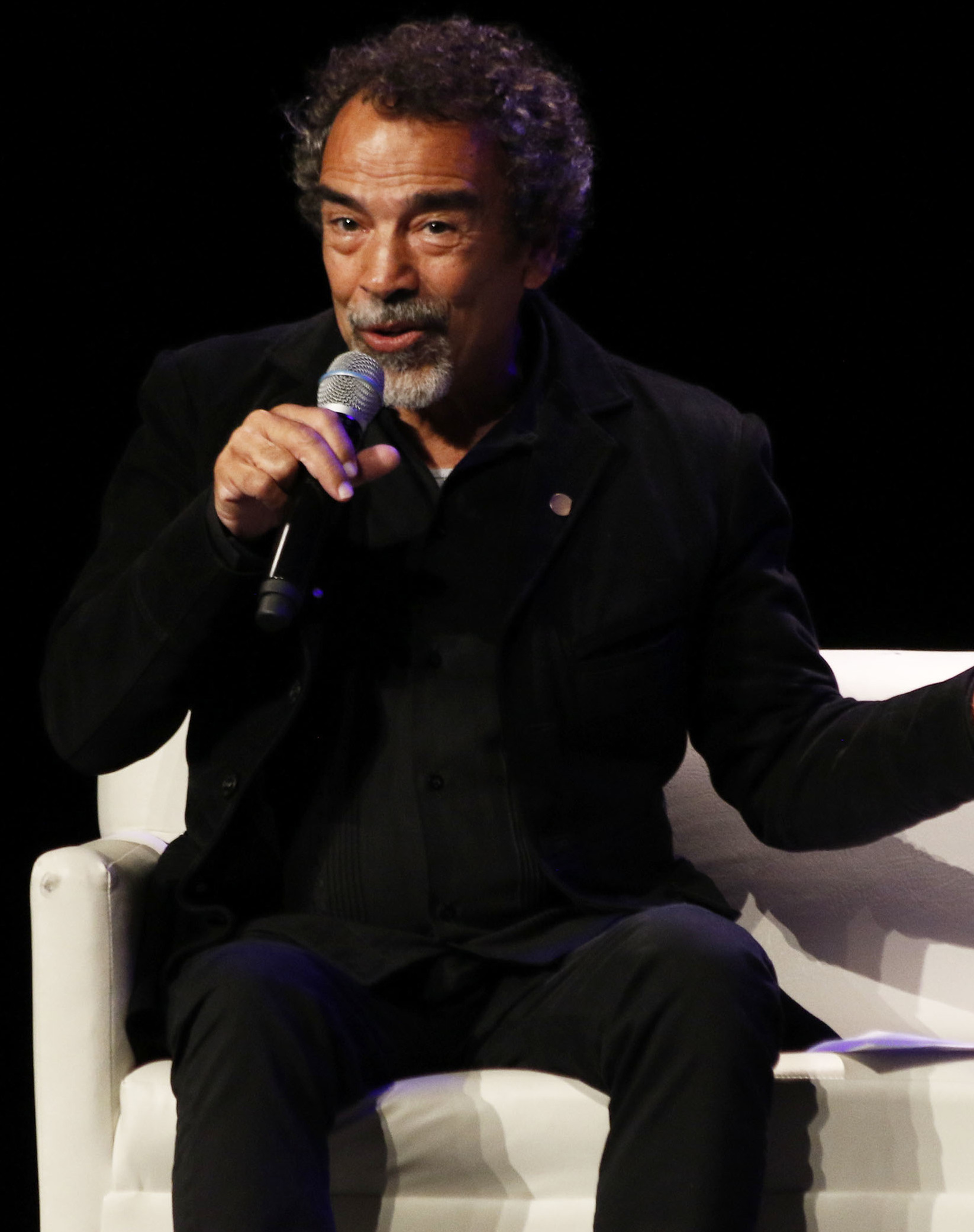
Alcázar in 2019

- Damián Alcázar as Benjamin García "El Benny"
- Joaquín Cosio as Eufemio Mata "El Cochiloco"
- Isela Vega as doña Rosaura
- Ernesto Gómez Cruz as don José Reyes/don Francisco "Pancho" Reyes
- María Rojo as doña Mary Reyes
- Elizabeth Cervantes as Guadalupe "Lupe" Solís
- Daniel Giménez Cacho as Captain Ramírez
- Jorge Zárate as Huasteco
- Salvador Sánchez as don Rogaciano, the godfather
- Angelina Peláez as mamá García
- Kristian Ferrer as Benjamín García Solís "El Diablito", the nephew
- Dagoberto Gama as Sargento
- Noé Hernández - as "El Sardo".
- Mauricio Isaac as José "J.R." Reyes
- Alejandro Calva as police chief
- Emilio Guerrero as Major
- Silverio Palacios as Cucaracha/Pánfilo, the twin brothers
- Tenoch Huerta as Pedro García "El Diablo"
- Jen Taylor as El Corinne
- Mario Almada as El Texano

== Release ==
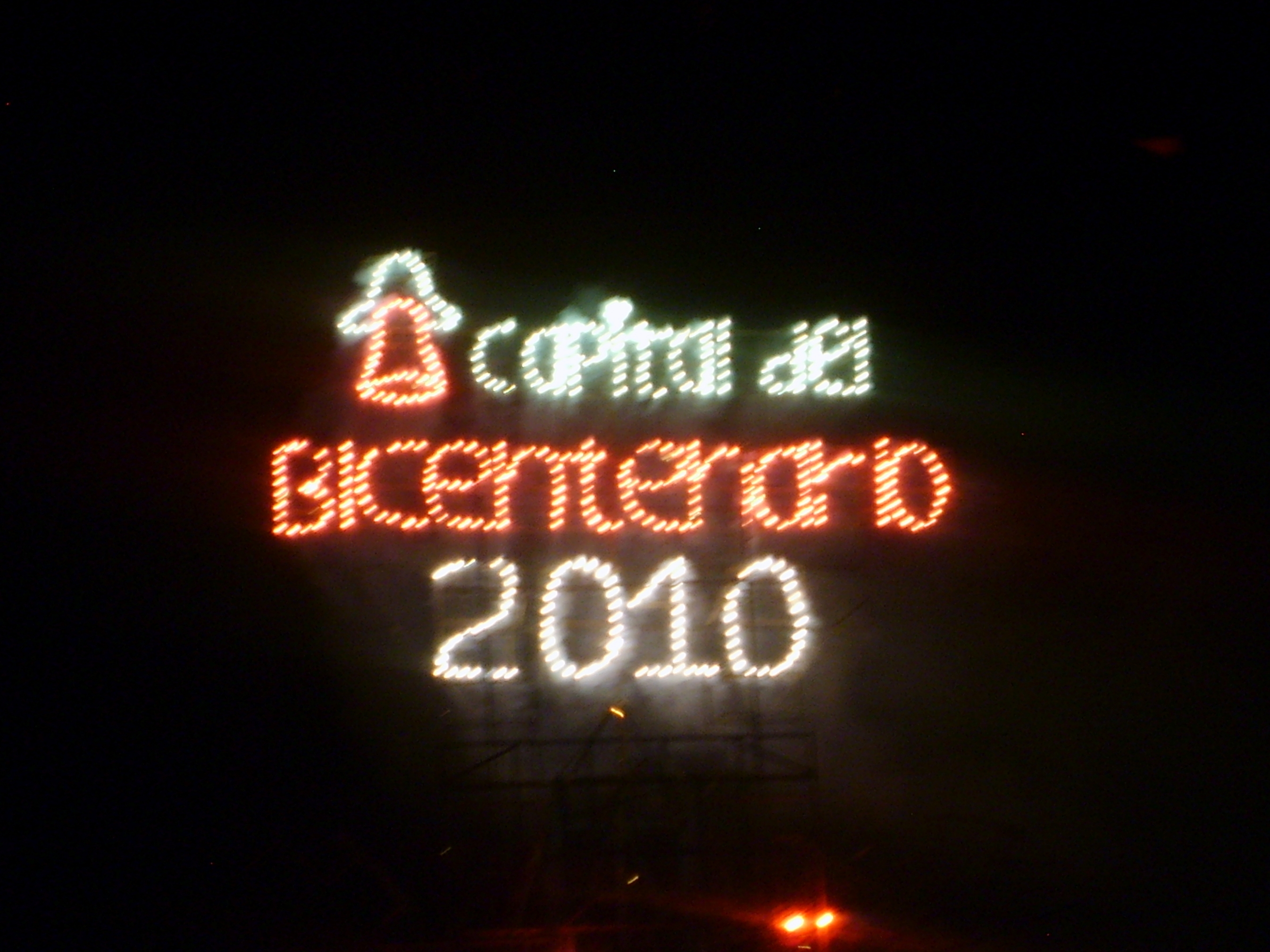
"Bicentenario" firework similar to one shown at the end of the film

The film was released to coincide with the celebrations of the 200th anniversary of Mexican independence.

== Awards ==
- Havana Film Festival, Grand Coral – First Prize
- San Diego Latino Film Festival, Corazón Award (Best Narrative Feature)
- Nominated for the 25th Goya Awards for the Goya Award for Best Spanish Language Foreign Film
