= Lorenzo O'Brien =

Peruvian-American writer and producer

Lorenzo O'Brien (born 1955) is a Peruvian-American writer-producer of Irish descent.

O'Brien was born in Lima and attended graduate school at UCLA. He has produced many television films and several features including Walker and El Patrullero, which he also wrote.

O'Brien wrote and produced for the PBS series American Family.
