= Salvador Sánchez (actor) =

Mexican actor and director (born 1943)

Alfredo Salvador Sánchez Bolaños (Note: In this Mexican name, the surname is Sánchez and the second or maternal family name is Bolaños.) (born October 1943), known professionally as Salvador Sánchez, is a Mexican actor and director who has worked extensively in theatre, film and television.

== Life ==
Salvador Sánchez was born in Tehuacán, Puebla, in October 1943. His theatre work began in Cuautla, Morelos, under the guidance of his brother Guillermo Gil. He later relocated to Mexico City to study at the theatre school of the National Institute of Fine Arts (INBA). He has since appeared in almost a hundred films and a similar number of theatre productions, and has directed ten telenovelas.

Since the early 2000s, he is a resident of Huitzilac, Morelos, where he runs the Foro La Negra, a cultural centre where young actors can obtain training.

== Work ==
Sánchez's film appearances include ¿No oyes ladrar los perros? (1974), a screen adaptation of the short story by Juan Rulfo, Canoa: memoria de un hecho vergonzoso (1976), a dramatisation of the San Miguel Canoa massacre of 1968, and Las Poquianchis (1976), based on the cause célèbre of the sisters Delfina and María de Jesús González and their network of prostitution and human trafficking in the 1950s and 1960s.

In 1981 he directed and appeared in Pedro Páramo, a screen adaptation of Rulfo's novel, and he portrayed David Alfaro Siqueiros in the 1983 film Frida, naturaleza viva, based on the life of painter Frida Kahlo. Foreign productions in which he has worked include Under the Volcano (1984, from the novel by Malcolm Lowry), and Old Gringo (1989, from the novel by Carlos Fuentes).

He has also worked frequently with director Luis Estrada, appearing in his satirical films La ley de Herodes (1999), El Infierno (2010), La dictadura perfecta (2014) and ¡Que viva México! (2023), and in The Dead Girls (2025), a six-part television adaptation by Estrada of Jorge Ibargüengoitia's novel Las muertas.

== Awards ==
Sánchez won the Ariel Award for Best Supporting Actor in 1997 for his performance in Amorosos fantasmas (1994). He was also nominated for the same prize in 1975, for La Choca; in 1984, for Motel; and in 2000, for La ley de Herodes.
