= The Mighty Victoria =

El Poderoso Victoria
- Theatrical release poster
- Directed by: Raúl Ramón
- Written by: Raúl Ramón
- Produced by: Red Albert; Jesús Chávez; Raúl Ramón; Victor Solorio; Fabiola Velázquez; Daniel Zavalza
- Starring: Damián Alcázar; Gerardo Oñate; Joaquín Cosío; Roberto Sosa; Edgar Vivar; Lorena de la Torre; Luis Felipe Tovar
- Cinematography: Raúl Ramón
- Edited by: Bernardo Pérez Tinajero
- Music by: Fernando Velázquez
- Production company: Vertigo Films
- Distributed by: Cinépolis Distribución
- Release dates: November 4, 2021 (Guadalajara); November 24, 2022 (Mexico)
- Running time: 117 minutes
- Country: Mexico
- Language: Spanish
- Box office: $382,587

The Mighty Victoria (Spanish: El Poderoso Victoria) is a 2021 Mexican adventure comedy-drama film written and directed by Raúl Ramón in his directorial debut. Starring Damián Alcázar, Gerardo Oñate, Joaquín Cosío, Roberto Sosa, Edgar Vivar, Lorena de la Torre and Luis Felipe Tovar.

== Synopsis ==
In the middle of the Mexican desert in 1936, is the town La Esperanza where they are informed of the closure of the mine, their main source of income, and with it the suspension of the railway route, their only means of communication with the rest of civilization. The young mechanic Durán must choose between giving up his roots by crossing the northern border, or helping a group of residents build their own steam train.

== Cast ==
The actors participating in this film are:

- Gerardo Oñate as Durán
- Damián Alcázar as Don Federico
- Roberto Sosa as The Wixárrika Indian
- Edgar Vivar as Don Edgar
- Eduardo España as Telegraphist
- Luis Felipe Tovar as The one-eyed
- Said Sandoval as "El Cheque"
- Rogeiro Martín del Campo as "El Sinaloa"
- Alberto Trujillo as "The Donkey"
- Joaquín Cosío as Jacinto the Machinist
- Lorena de la Torre as Victoria
- Adal Ramones as Raúl Martínez
- Daniel Martínez as Lic. Daniel Martínez
- Alonso Echánove as Tata Julio
- Ana Monterrubio as Fabiola
- Paulino Partida as Epigmenio
- Iñaki Ramón as Antonio
- Belén Rodríguez as Dona Carmelita
- José Sefami as Don Julián
- Andy Chavez de Moore as María Luisa
- Cornelio García as Male Octogenarian
- Martha Morales as Female Octogenarian
- Sonia Sánchez as Nun 1
- Karen Flores as Nun 2
- Helena Corona as Brunette woman
- Javier Lacroix as Priest
- Nena Aceves as "La Güera"

== Production ==
Principal photography began on May 9, 2019, at Mapimí and Ojuela Bridge in Durango, Mexico. It was also filmed in Jalisco, Puebla & Aguascalientes.

== Release ==
It initially premiered in Mexico on November 4, 2021, at the Guadalajara International Film Festival. It was commercially released on November 24, 2022, in Mexican theaters.

== Reception ==
=== Critical reception ===
Irving Torres Yllán from Cine NT called the film a candid effort to tell a story suitable for the whole family, as well as possessing good special effects. However, it also highlights the rhythm that fails at times, the unbelievable situations and the lack of emotion in its soundtrack. Loretta Chnattiri from Código Spaghetti highlights the fidelity of the tape in recreating the atmosphere of the thirties, in addition to calling the film more of a visual spectacle because the script and the direction of the actors are described as poor.

=== Accolades ===
Year	Award / Festival	Category	Recipient	Result	Ref.
2021	Guadalajara International Film Festival	Best Feature Film - Audience Award	The Mighty Victoria	Won	
2021	Prague Film Festival	Best Film	The Mighty Victoria	Won	
2022	Ferrara Film Festival	Best Director	Raúl Ramón	Won	
2022	San Diego Latino Film Festival	Best Narrative Feature - Audience Award	The Mighty Victoria	Won	
2022	Canacine Awards	Best Newcomer - Male	Gerardo Oñate	Nominated	
2022	Canacine Awards	Industry Development	The Mighty Victoria	Won	
2023	Diosas de Plata	Best Film	Raúl Ramón & Fabiola Velázquez	Nominated	
2023	Diosas de Plata	Best First Work	Raúl Ramón	Nominated	
2023	Diosas de Plata	Best Direction	Raúl Ramón	Nominated	
2023	Diosas de Plata	Best Screenplay	Raúl Ramón	Nominated	
2023	Diosas de Plata	Best Actor	Damián Alcázar	Nominated	
2023	Diosas de Plata	Best Supporting Actor	Joaquín Cosío	Won	
2023	Diosas de Plata	Best Newcomer - Male	Gerardo Oñate	Nominated	
2023	Diosas de Plata	Best Actor in a Minor Role	Luis Felipe Tovar	Nominated	
2023	Diosas de Plata	Best Actress in a Minor Role	Lorena de la Torre	Nominated	
2023	Diosas de Plata	Best Cinematography	Raúl Ramón	Won	
2023	Diosas de Plata	Best Music	Fernando Velázquez	Nominated	
2023	Diosas de Plata	Best Original Song	Belén Rodríguez ("El Poderoso Victoria")	Nominated	
2023	Ariel Awards	Best Costume Design	Mayra Juárez	Nominated	
2023	Ariel Awards	Best Special Effects	Elliot Rebollar Feregrino	Nominated	
