= ¡Que viva México! (2023 film) =

- Theatrical release poster
- Directed by: Luis Estrada
- Written by: Luis Estrada; Jaime Sampietro
- Produced by: Alexa Aroesty; Maynné Cortés; Luis Estrada; Rolf Helbig; Sandra Solares
- Starring: Alfonso Herrera; Damián Alcázar; Joaquín Cosío; Ana de la Reguera
- Cinematography: Alberto Anaya
- Edited by: Mariana Rodríguez
- Music by: Nacho Mastretta
- Production companies: Sony Pictures International Productions; Bandidos Films
- Distributed by: Sony Pictures Releasing International
- Release date: March 23, 2023
- Running time: 191 minutes
- Country: Mexico
- Language: Spanish
- Box office: $4.2 million

¡Que viva México! (lit. 'Long live Mexico!') is a 2023 Mexican black comedy political satire film directed by Luis Estrada and written by Estrada and Jaime Sampietro. The film stars Alfonso Herrera, Damián Alcázar, Joaquín Cosío, and Ana de la Reguera. The film opened to mixed reviews.

The film was released on March 23, 2023, in Mexico and on May 11 on Netflix.

== Synopsis ==
Pancho Reyes is an educated upper class business executive at a factory in Mexico City but hails from a rural small town. He strives to support his wife Mari and their two children, while simultaneously not contacting his family for the past 20 years.

One morning, he has a nightmare about his long-estranged relatives taking his family hostage and shooting him over his refusal to share his wealth. That same day, he receives many calls from his father, Rosendo, that his grandfather died and that he needs to be present at the reading of the will and testament. Pancho does not want to know anything about his poor family, whom he abandoned in search of a better future, but his wife encourages him to go to find out if he left them an inheritance.

Pancho's boss grants him 5 days leave and the family (along with their maid Lupita) travels to the village. Immediately they are horrified by the abject poverty and poor living conditions, but quickly become reconnected with his family.

The will reveals that his grandfather left all his property rights and land ownership to Pancho, as he was the only one in the entire family to achieve a successful career.

His uncle Regino is in the local government and reveals that the family has several years' worth of unpaid debts worth more than the value of their home and land. However, he offers to eliminate all the debt in exchange for him purchasing all the land rights.

Shortly after discussing the proposition with his family, a truck arrives with a safe belonging to his grandfather and explicit instructions that only Pancho be allowed to open it and access its contents. Inside the safe is a revolver and millions of dollars' worth of gold bars which Pancho and his wife plan to claim for themselves and leave everyone else behind.

Their plans are foiled by Rosendo who hears their conversation through a hole in the wall, and in retaliation some relatives burn their minivan, stranding the family there. Pancho places the gold bars in bags and buries them in the field behind the house.

Other relatives break into the house at night searching for the gold and Pancho shoots one of them dead, leading to his arrest. In jail, Regino warns Pancho that he is looking at several years in prison and offers to bribe the judge and set him free in exchange for giving him the buried treasure.

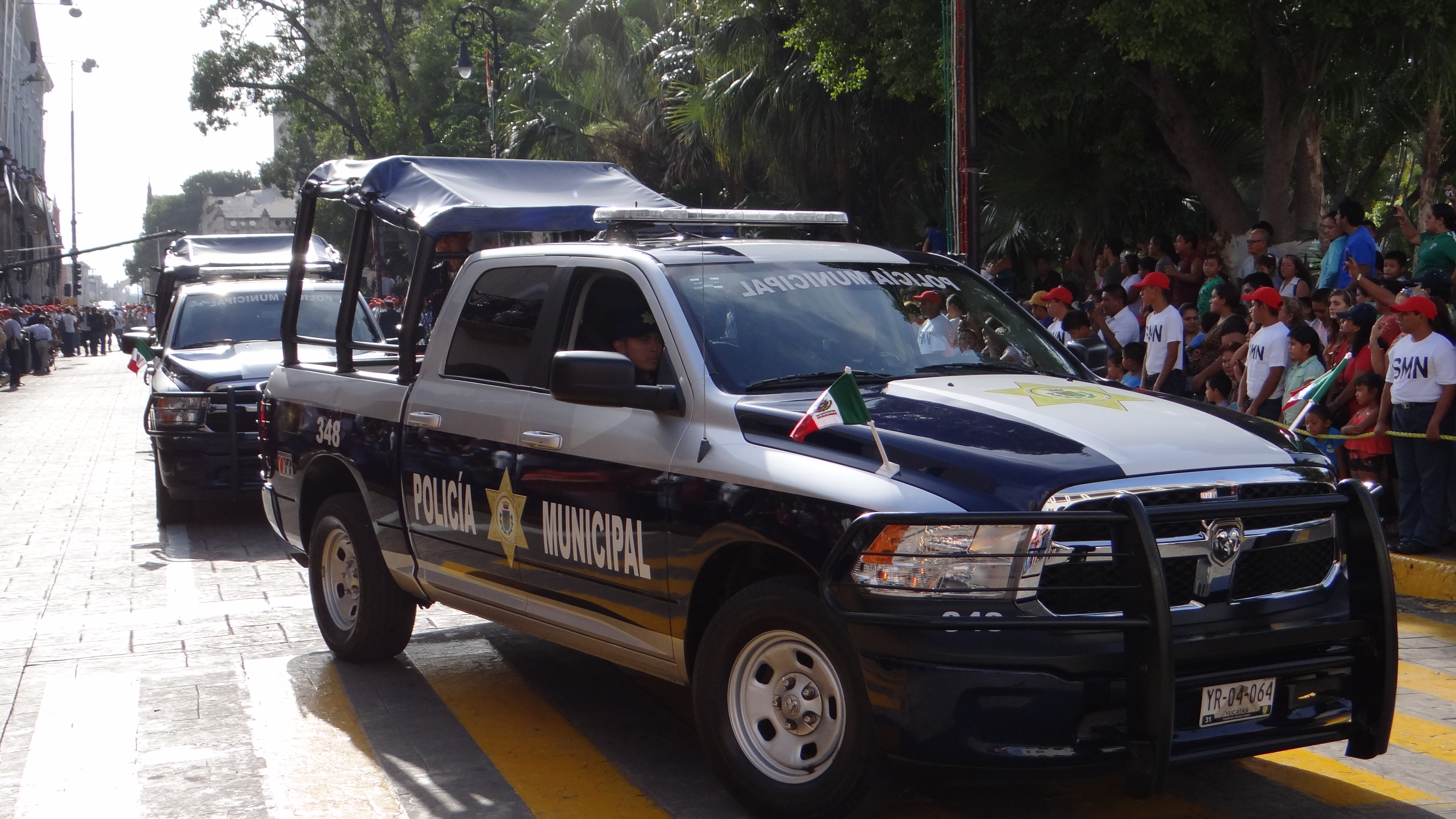
Mexican Municipal Police Truck as seen in the film

Pancho's wife, the neighborhood kids, and later Pancho's family frantically dig through the fields for the buried treasure, but several days pass and nothing is found. His wife and his two children return to Mexico City, except for Lupita who has fallen in love with his brother. Regino grants Pancho permission to leave prison and dig for it himself.

Many days pass, and he digs an enormous hole, eventually collapsing from exhaustion. In the end, he decides to give up all the land (and the chances of partaking in the wealth) to Regino for the chance to return to his family.

Regino, along with his son Reginito (a police officer) use their authority to evict the family, shooting tear gas into the house and forcing them all to sit in jail. He signs development contracts with a US-based Multinational corporation which brings machines to the land. Eventually they find not only the hidden bags but also an enormous gold deposit. Upon finding out that he unknowingly relinquished all ownership of the gold in the contracts, Regino dies from an apparent heart attack.

The family, freed from jail, finds that their land has been fenced off and turned into a gold mine. Pancho is demoted to a janitor. One day he wakes up to find that his formerly clean, modern house now looks like his families', and that all of his relatives have moved in.

== Cast ==
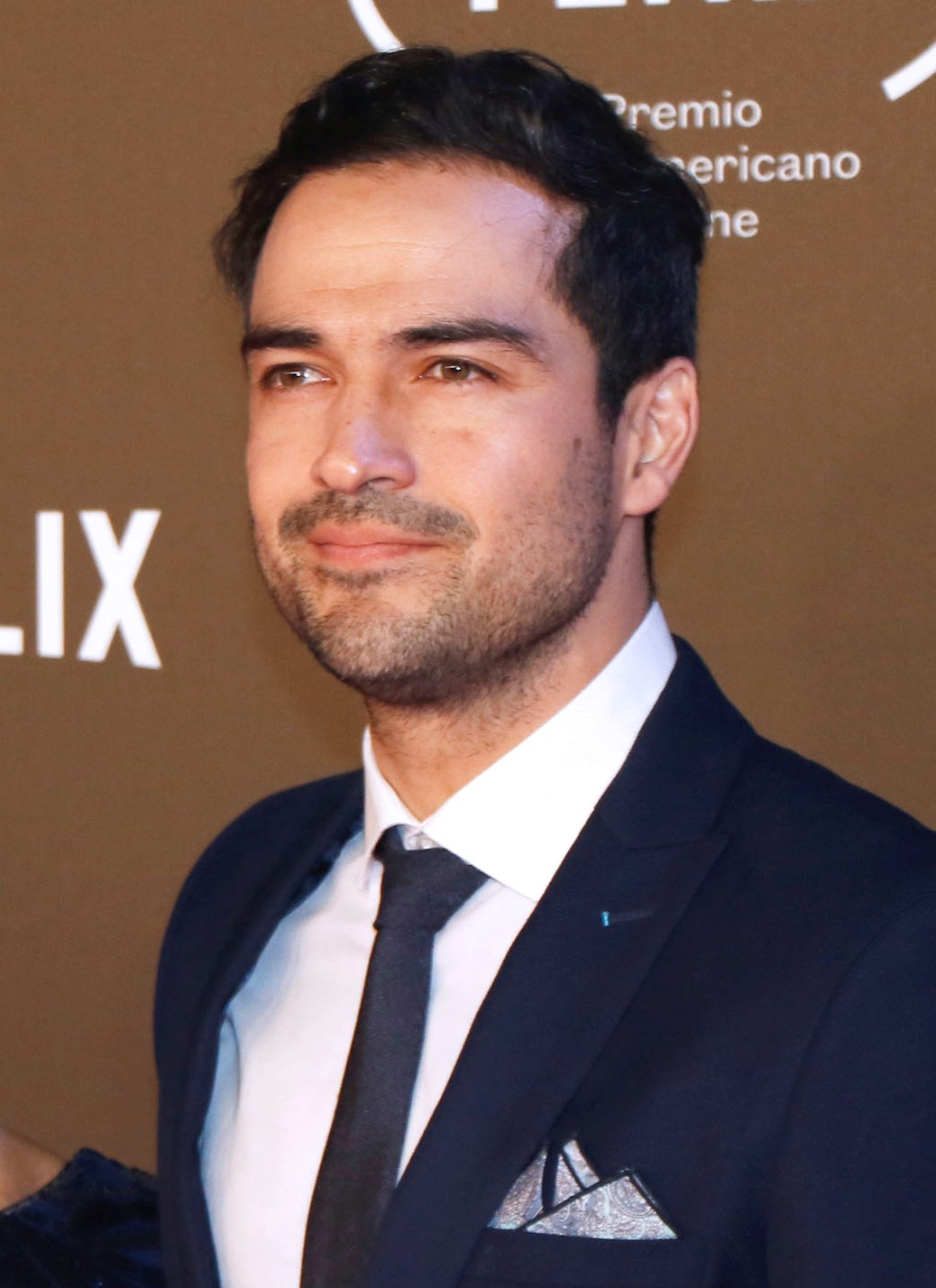
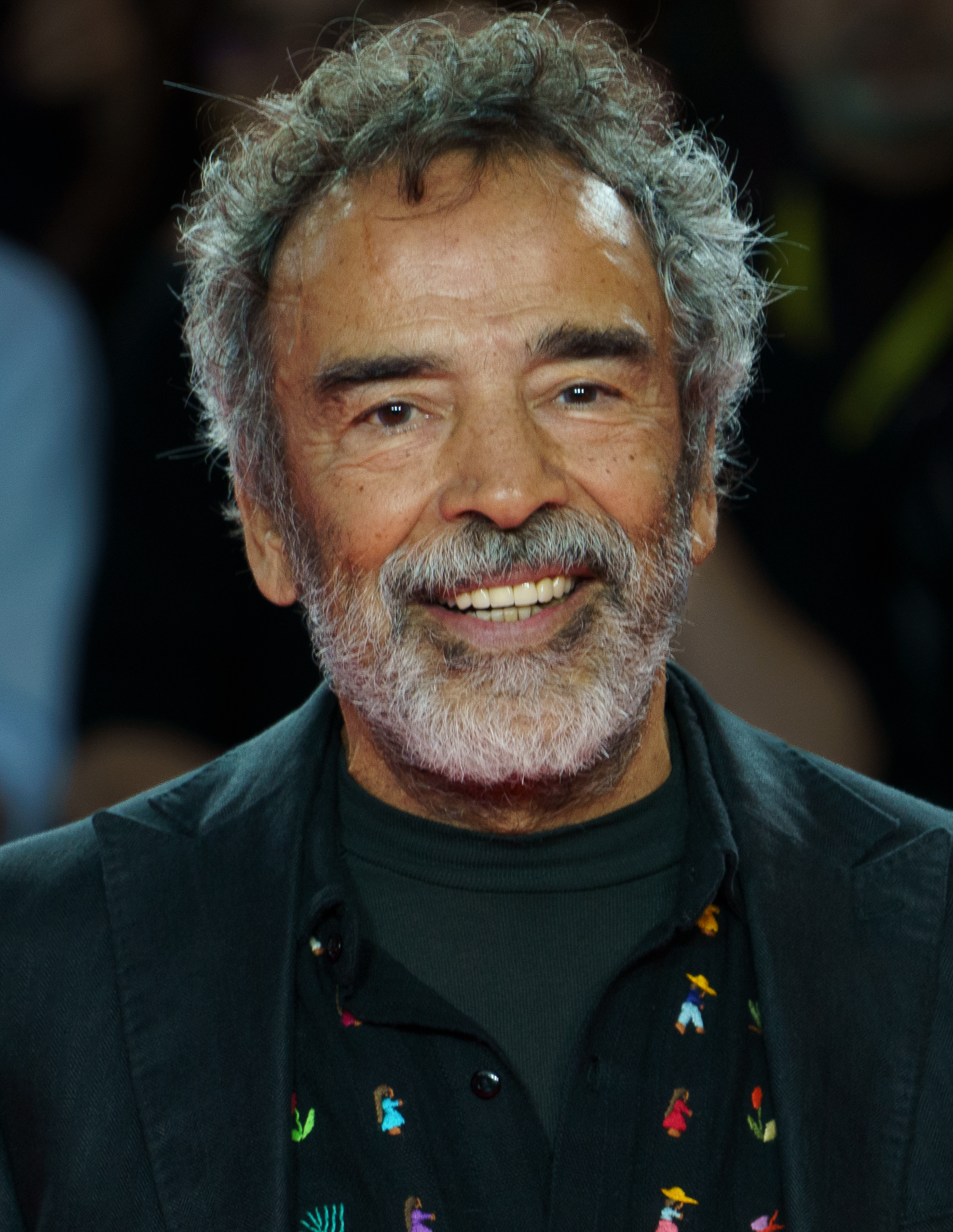
Alfonso Herrera in 2017, and Damián Alcázar in 2025
- Alfonso Herrera as Pancho Francisco Reyes
- Damián Alcázar as Rosendo / Regino / Ambrósio
- Joaquín Cosió as Rosendito / Reginito / Grandfather
- Ana de la Reguera as Maria "Mari" Elena Reyes
- Ana Martín as Dolores
- Angelina Peláez as Grandmother
- Mayra Hermosillo as Gloria
- Fermín Martínez as "El Lupe"
- Luis Fernando Peña as Hilario
- Cuauhtli Jiménez as Jacinta
- Adriana Louvier as Normita
- Edwarda Gurrola as Florencia
- Leticia Huijara as Regino secretary
- Vico Escorcia as Bartola
- Zaide Silvia Gutiérrez as Socorro
- Sonia Couoh as Lupita
- Silverio Palacios as "El mapache"
- Enrique Arreola as Cruz
- Salvador Sánchez as Notary
- Álex Perea as Rufino
- Ariane Pellicer as The Catrina
- José Sefami as Jaime Sampaolo
- José Manuel Poncelis as Don Pancracio
- Natalia Quiroz as Pánfila
- Amaury Reyes as Ryan
- Mayte Fernández as Cati
- Raphael Camarena as Tony
- Marius Biegai as "Gringo 1"
- Daniel Raymont as "Gringo" 2

== Production ==
Principal photography for the film began on August 30, 2021 and ended in October of the same year in the Pueblo Mágico de Real de Catorce in northern San Luis Potosí, Mexico.

== Release ==
Originally scheduled for a limited theatrical release on November 3, 2022 followed by a worldwide release on November 16, 2022, on Netflix, the film's release was postponed as negotiations between Netflix and director Luis Estrada to have a wider theatrical release (much like Bardo, False Chronicle of a Handful of Truths did) broke down. Estrada then bought back theatrical rights to the film, seeking another distributor. In February 2023, Estrada announced that he had reached a deal with Sony Pictures for a wide theatrical release. The film was released on March 23, 2023, in Mexico, United States and other countries, followed by a streaming release on May 11 on Netflix.

== Reception ==
=== Critical reception ===
On the review aggregator website Rotten Tomatoes, 33% of 6 critics' reviews are positive, with an average rating of 4.9/10.

=== Controversy ===
When the film was released, it divided the public and critics in its native Mexico, being criticized for "denigrating the country". Among his critics are Mexican television producer Juan Osorio Ortiz, and the 65th president of Mexico Andrés Manuel López Obrador, the latter who called the film's director a "progressive virtual signaller", classist and racist. Following López Obrador's criticism, director Luis Estrada responded by saying that the president, instead of worrying about a movie he hasn't even seen, should focus on issues that are more relevant to the country.

== Accolades ==
Year	Award	Category	Recipient	Result	Ref.
2023	19th Canacine Awards	Best Film	¡Que viva México!	Nominated	
2023	19th Canacine Awards	Best Director	Luis Estrada	Nominated	
2023	19th Canacine Awards	Best Actor	Alfonso Herrera	Nominated	
2023	19th Canacine Awards	Best Actor	Damián Alcázar	Nominated	
2023	19th Canacine Awards	Best Promotional Campaign	Sony Pictures Releasing International	Nominated	
