= Joaquín Cosío =

Mexican actor and poet (born 1962)

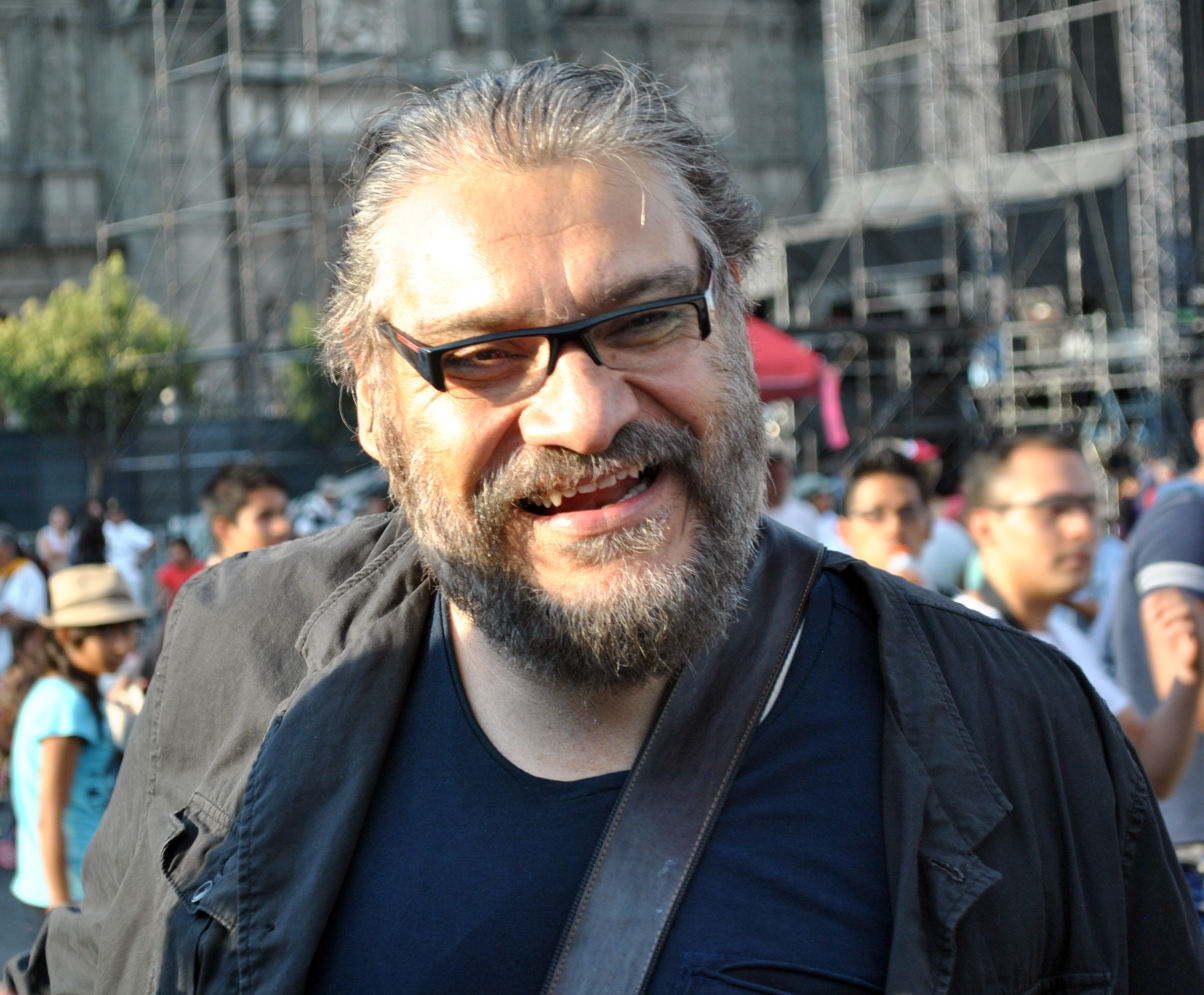
- Cosío in 2012
- Born: 6 October 1962 (age 64); Tepic, Nayarit, Mexico
- Occupations: Actor; poet
- Years active: 1980–present

Joaquín Cosío Osuna (born 6 October 1962) is a Mexican actor and poet. He has been nominated four times for the Mexican Academy of Film Ariel Awards, winning the Ariel Award for Best Supporting Actor for his work as Gabriel in The Thin Yellow Line in 2016.

He is best known for roles such as Rubén "Mascarita" in Matando Cabos (2004), General Medrano in Quantum of Solace (2008), El Infierno (2010), he was Angel Guzman Hurtado, The Silver Angel in The Strain (2014–2017), Eufemio "El Cochiloco" Mata in El Infierno, Ernesto Fonseca Carrillo in Narcos: Mexico (2018–2021) and Major General Mateo Suárez in The Suicide Squad (2021).

== Life and career ==
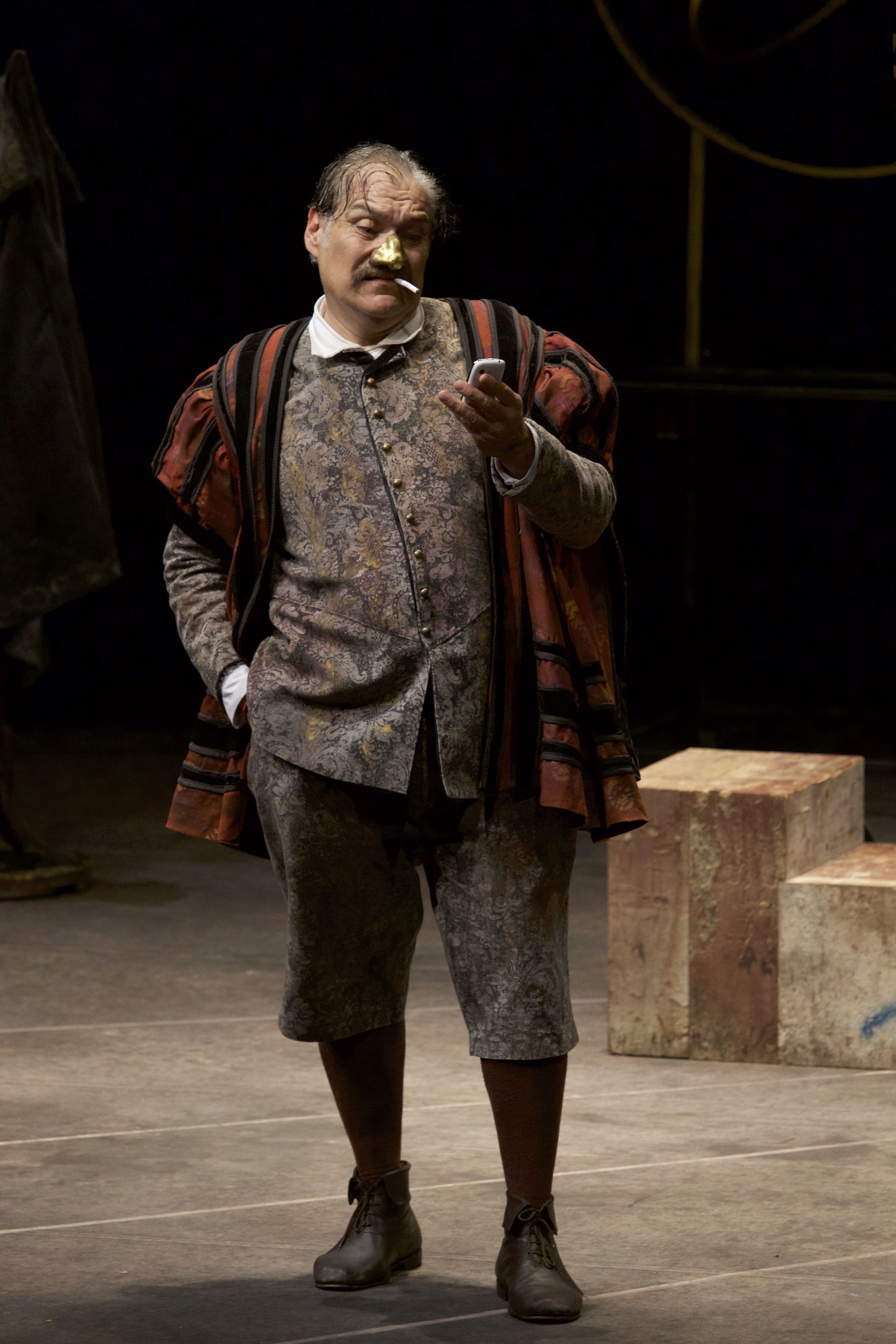
Cosío in 2017

Cosío began his theatrical career in the early 1980s. He made his screen debut in 2001, at the age of 38, in the film The Blue Room and he has since participated in over 40 feature films and television shows (to 2016). Cosío played a character named Hector, a multi-episode role in the HBO comedy Eastbound & Down. He played General Medrano, one of the main villains in the James Bond film Quantum of Solace, and acted alongside Benicio del Toro in Oliver Stone's gritty thriller, Savages. Cosío appeared in Robert Duvall's A Night in Old Mexico, and in Disney's 2013 film The Lone Ranger.

In 2015, he took on the role of Angel Guzman Hurtado, The Silver Angel for 17 episodes of the Guillermo del Toro and Chuck Hogan created Vampire horror FX television series The Strain (2014–2017).

He played Don Neto in Narcos: Mexico in 2018. He played Casimiro "Pop" Morales in Netflix's Gentefied from 2020 to 2021.

== Awards ==
He has been nominated four times for the Mexican Academy of Film Ariel Awards. In 2005 for Ariel Award for Best Supporting Actor for his portrayal of the lovable and ruthless "Mascarita" in the Mexican box office hit Matando Cabos, and again in 2011 for his work in the film El Infierno. He was nominated for Ariel Award for Best Actor in 2012, for his work in Pastorela. In 2016, he finally won Ariel Award for Best Supporting Actor for his work as Gabriel in The Thin Yellow Line.

== Filmography ==
=== Film ===
- La habitación azul (2002) – Maestro de Obras
- Una de dos (2002) – Tío Luis
- Sin ton ni Sonia (2003) – Coronel Astorga
- Matando Cabos (2004) – Rubén "Mascarita"
- Hugoool (2004, Short) – The Commandment
- La afición somos todos (2004, Short) – Apostador
- El otro José (2005, Short)
- Un mundo maravilloso (2006) – Vagabundo
- Efectos secundarios (2006) – Conductor
- La sangre iluminada (2007) – Isaías
- La verdadera pasión (2007, Short)
- Segurança Nacional (2007) – Héctor Gasca
- Violonchelo (2008) – Agente Salas
- El viaje de Teo (2008) – Manlio
- Arráncame la vida (2008) – Juan
- Quantum of Solace (2008) – General Medrano
- Rudo y Cursi (2008) – Arnulfo
- Backyard (2009) – Peralta
- Me importas tú... y tú (2009)
- El mar muerto (2010) – Arturo
- Sucedió en un día (2010) – Juan (segment "La historia del hombre que nunca fue Consalero")
- Segurança Nacional (2010) – Hector Gasca
- El Infierno (2010) – El Cochiloco
- Te Presentó a Laura (2010) – Guadalupe
- Salvando al soldado Pérez (2011) – Rosalío Mendoza
- Entre la noche y el día (2011)
- A Better Life (2011) – Blasco Martinez
- Pastorela (2011) – Agent Jesus Juarez
- La revolución de Juan Escopeta (2011) – Juan Escopeta (voice)
- Marcelo (2012) – Nico
- Savages (2012) – El Azul
- La vida precoz y breve de Sabina Rivas (2012) – Burrona
- El Santos vs. la Tetona Mendoza (2012) – Police Officer (voice)
- Ted (2012) - Ted (Latin American Spanish version)
- Las paredes hablan (2012) – Carlín
- El Arribo de Conrado Sierra (2012) – Don Chalio
- Bless Me, Ultima (2013) – Narciso
- The Lone Ranger (2013) – Jesus
- A Night in Old Mexico (2013) – Cholo
- Jirón de Niebla (2013) – Vega
- Familia Gang (2014) – Escolta Coyote 1
- Cantinflas (2014) – Emilio 'Indio' Fernández
- The Perfect Dictatorship (2014) – Agustín Morales
- Heriberto y Demetrio (2014) – Heriberto
- The Thin Yellow Line (2015) – Gabriel
- Hot Pursuit (2015) – Vicente Cortez
- Villa, itinerario de una pasión (2015) – Abraham Gonzalez
- Las Aparicio (2015) – Camilo Gutiérrez
- Ted 2 (2015) - Ted (Latin American Spanish version)
- Compadres (2016)
- Sundown (2016) – Pedro
- Me gusta, pero me asusta (2017) – Don Gumaro
- Belzebuth (2017) – Emmanuel Ritter
- Cinderelo (2017)
- Spider-Man: Into the Spider-Verse (2018) – The Scorpion (voice, English and Latin American Spanish versions)
- Sonora, the Devil's Highway (2018) – Emeterio
- Powder (2019) – Don Manuel
- Rambo: Last Blood (2019) – Don Manuel
- The Mighty Victoria (2021) – Jacinto the Machinist
- The Suicide Squad (2021) – Mateo Suárez, Major General (English and Latin American Spanish versions)
- ¡Que viva México! (2023) – Rosendito / Reginito / Grandfather
- Total Loss (2024) – Bonilla
- V de Víctor (2024) – Jorge

=== Television ===
- Los Plateados (2005) – Kamal Bashur
- Sexo y otros secretos (2007) – Vicente
- Los héroes del norte (2010) – Don Hassan
- Eastbound & Down (2011; 3 episodes) – Hector
- Mentir para vivir (2013) – Joaquín Barragán
- The Strain (2015–16; 17 episodes) – Angel Guzman Hurtado / The Silver Angel
- Narcos: Mexico (2018–20; 11 episodes) – Ernesto 'Don Neto' Fonseca Carrillo
- El Candidato (2020; 10 episodes) – Rafael Bautista
- Gentefied (2020–21; 18 episodes) – Casimiro "Pop" Morales
- Maya and the Three (2021) – Camazotz (voice)
- Midnight Family (2024) – Ramón
