= Damián Alcázar =

Mexican actor & politician (born 1953)

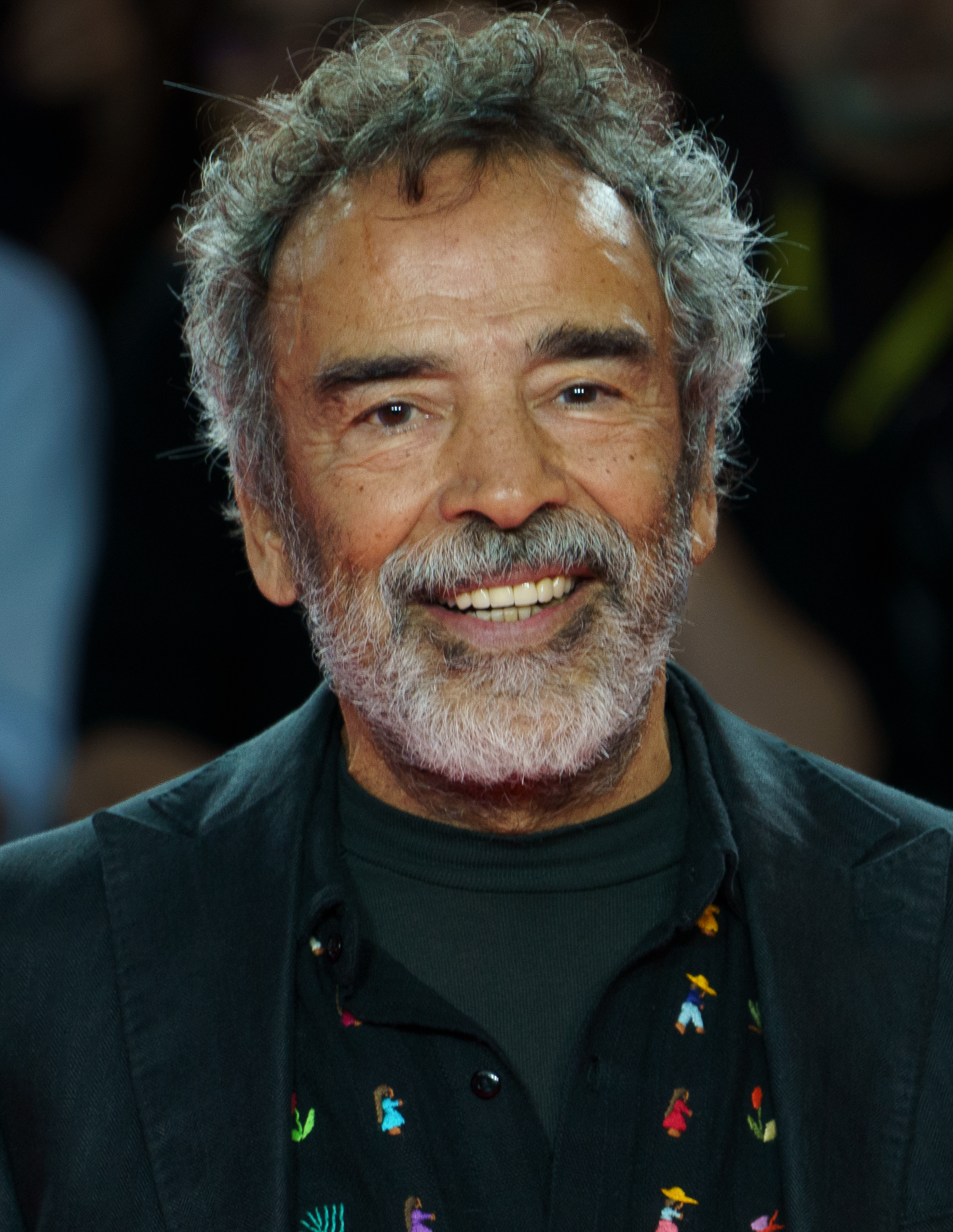
- Alcázar in March 2025
- Born: January 8, 1953 (age 73); Jiquilpan, Michoacán, Mexico
- Occupations: Actor, politician
- Years active: 1985–present

Damián Alcázar (born January 8, 1953) is a Mexican actor. He is best known internationally for his roles as Lord Sopespian in The Chronicles of Narnia: Prince Caspian, Gilberto Rodríguez Orejuela in the Netflix series Narcos, and Alberto Reyes in Blue Beetle. He used his fame to win an electoral race, but never served as a deputy in the Constituent Assembly of Mexico City representing the MORENA political party.

== Career ==
Damián Alcázar studied acting first at the National Institute of Fine Arts and at the Theatrical Experimentation Center, then continued at the Faculty of Theater of the Veracruz University, where in later years he would work as a teacher.

He served as an actor for eight years in two theatre companies, alongside the most prestigious directors in Mexico. Notably under the direction of George Labaudan, he appeared on Jean Genet's play, The Balcony.

He has appeared in six foreign films and more than twenty-eight Mexican films. He was awarded the Ariel for Best Actor in 1999 and in 2004, for the films Under California: The Time Limit, by Carlos Bolado, and Crónicas, by Sebastián Cordero. He also won the prize for Best Actor at the Festival of Valladolid in Spain, for the latter.

He received the Ariel Award for Best Supporting Actor for El anzuelo, by Ernesto Rimoch; for Lolo, by Francisco Athié; and for Carlos Carrera's successful film, The Crime of Padre Amaro. Alcázar has been nominated to receive this same award four other times. He won the award for Best Actor at the Cartagena Film Festival in Colombia for the film Two Crimes, by Roberto Sneider.

He has also worked on telenovelas, the most recent one being Secretos del corazón, produced by Epigmenio Ibarra for TV Azteca.

In April 2013 he was awarded the Honor Prize of the Latin American Film Show of Lleida with José Coronado.

In June 2016 he ran for representative in Mexico City, using his public personna to atract votes for the political party MORENA, never intended to legislate. Was elected and left the job to his running mate in January 2017 after being absent for three months.

== Filmography ==
=== Film ===
Year	Title	Role	Notes
1985	El centro del laberinto		Short film
1986	Debutantes		Short film
1987	Pasa en las mejores familias		
1987	Carta de un sobrino		Short film
1989	Romero	Campesino	
1989	La ciudad al desnudo	La Suavecita	Nominated — Ariel Award for Best Supporting Actor
1990	La ciudad al desnudo		Short film
1991	Un cielo cruel y una tierra colorada		Short film
1991	Sombra de ángel		Short film
1991	La leyenda de una máscara	Olmo Robles	
1991	Bandidos	Mexican man	
1991	Mujer del puerto	Marro	
1991	El Patrullero	Suspect #1	
1991	Diplomatic Immunity	Pool Cleaner / Hitman	Uncredited
1992	De barros		Short film
1992	Cita en el paraíso	Pablo	Short film
1993	Abuelita de Bakman	Escritor	
1993	Lolo	Marcelino	Ariel Award for Best Supporting Actor
1994	Ámbar	Prisoner #3	
1995	Dos crímenes	Marcos González	Nominated — Ariel Award for Best Actor
1995	Algunas nubes	La Rata	
1995	En el aire	Cmdr. Paco	
1996	Tres minutos en la oscuridad		
1996	El anzuelo	Humberto	Ariel Award for Best Supporting Actor
1996	Katuwira	Caronte	
1996	Overkill	José	
1997	Men with Guns	Padre Portillo	
1998	Bajo California: El límite del tiempo	Damián	Ariel Award for Best Actor
1999	Ave María	Cuña	
1999	Herod's Law	Juan Vargas	Ariel Award for Best Actor
1999	Sofía	Pedro	
2000	Compassionate Sex	Virgin man	
2000	Crónica de un desayuno	Taxi driver	
2001	Pachito Rex - Me voy pero no del todo		
2001	La habitación azul	Garduño	
2002	The Crime of Father Amaro	Padre Natalio Pérez	Ariel Award for Best Supporting Actor
2004	Crónicas	Vinicio Cepeda	Ariel Award for Best Actor
2004	Héctor	Martín	
2005	Borderland	Ulises	
2005	Las vueltas del citrillo	Sargent Collazo	Ariel Award for Best Actor
2006	Un mundo maravilloso	Juan Pérez	
2006	Only God Knows	Presagio	
2006	Fuera del cielo	Officer Rojas	
2007	Satanás	Eliseo	
2007	¡Pega Martín pega!		
2008	El viaje de Teo	Wenceslao	
2008	The Chronicles of Narnia: Prince Caspian	Lord Sopespian	
2009	Marea de arena		
2009	Bala mordida	Commander	
2009	Don't Let Me Drown	Ramón	
2009	Of Love and Other Demons	Abrenuncio	
2009	Corto libre		
2010	De la infancia	Basilio Niebla	
2010	Chicogrande	Chicogrande	
2010	Garcia	Garcia	
2010	El Infierno	Benjamín "El Benny" García	Ariel Award for Best Actor
2010	El último comandante	Paco Jarquín	
2012	Fecha de caducidad	Genaro	
2012	Hermano lejano	Psychologist	
2013	Ciudadano Buelna	Lucio Blanco	
2013	Forgotten	José Mendieta	
2014	The Perfect Dictatorship	Governor Carmelo Vargas	
2014	La sargento Matacho	Feliciano Pachón	
2014	Eddie Reynolds y los ángeles de acero	Lalo / Eddie	Winner - Best Actor at the Hermosillo International Film Festival
2014	Magallanes	Harvey Magallanes	
2015	The Thin Yellow Line	Toño	Nominated — Ariel Award for Best Actor
2019	The Mongolian Conspiracy	Filiberto García	
2019	Miss Bala	Chief Rafael Saucedo	
2021	The Mighty Victoria	Don Federico	
2021	Presencias		
2022	The Monroy Affaire	Ronnie Monroy	
2023	Blue Beetle	Alberto Reyes	
2023	The Four Altars	Don Abel	
2023	¡Que viva México!	Rosendo	
2026	Ha-Chan, Shake Your Booty!	Jacobo	

=== Television ===
Year	Title	Role	Notes
1986	El camino secreto	José Luis	
1990	Mi pequeña Soledad	Florentino	
1991	Yo no creo en los hombres	Juan	
1999	Cuentos para solitarios	Ramón	Episode: "La mala hora de Ramón"
2000–2001	Todo por amor	Don Mariano	
2003	And Starring Pancho Villa as Himself	Gen. Rodolfo Fierro	Television film
2003–2004	El alma herida	Francisco "Frank" López	
2009–2012	Kdabra	René	33 episodes
2010	Las Aparicio	Hernán Almada	
2011	El encanto del águila	Plutarco Elías Calles	3 episodes
2012	Lynch	Eduardo Zúñiga	2 episodes
2012	Capadocia	Alberto Gómez	7 episodes
2014	Metástasis	Tuco Salamanca	4 episodes
2014	Señora Acero	Vicente Acero	Guest role (season 1); archive footage (seasons 2-3)
2015–2016	El Dandy	Juan Antonio Ramírez / El Chueco	Main role
2016–2017	2091	Sr. Patrick Hull	12 episodes
2016–2017	Narcos	Gilberto Rodríguez Orejuela	Main role; 18 episodes
2017	Sin senos sí hay paraíso	Don Chalo	Recurring role
2018	José José, el príncipe de la canción	José Sosa Esquivel	Recurring role
2018	Rubirosa	Rafael Trujillo	
2019	Preso No. 1	Salvador	Recurring role
2021–2025	Acapulco	Don Pablo Bonilla	Recurring role
2021	Narcos: Mexico	Gilberto Rodríguez Orejuela	
2026	El Mochaorejas	Daniel Arizmendi López	
