= Ernesto Gómez Cruz =

Mexican actor (1933–2024)

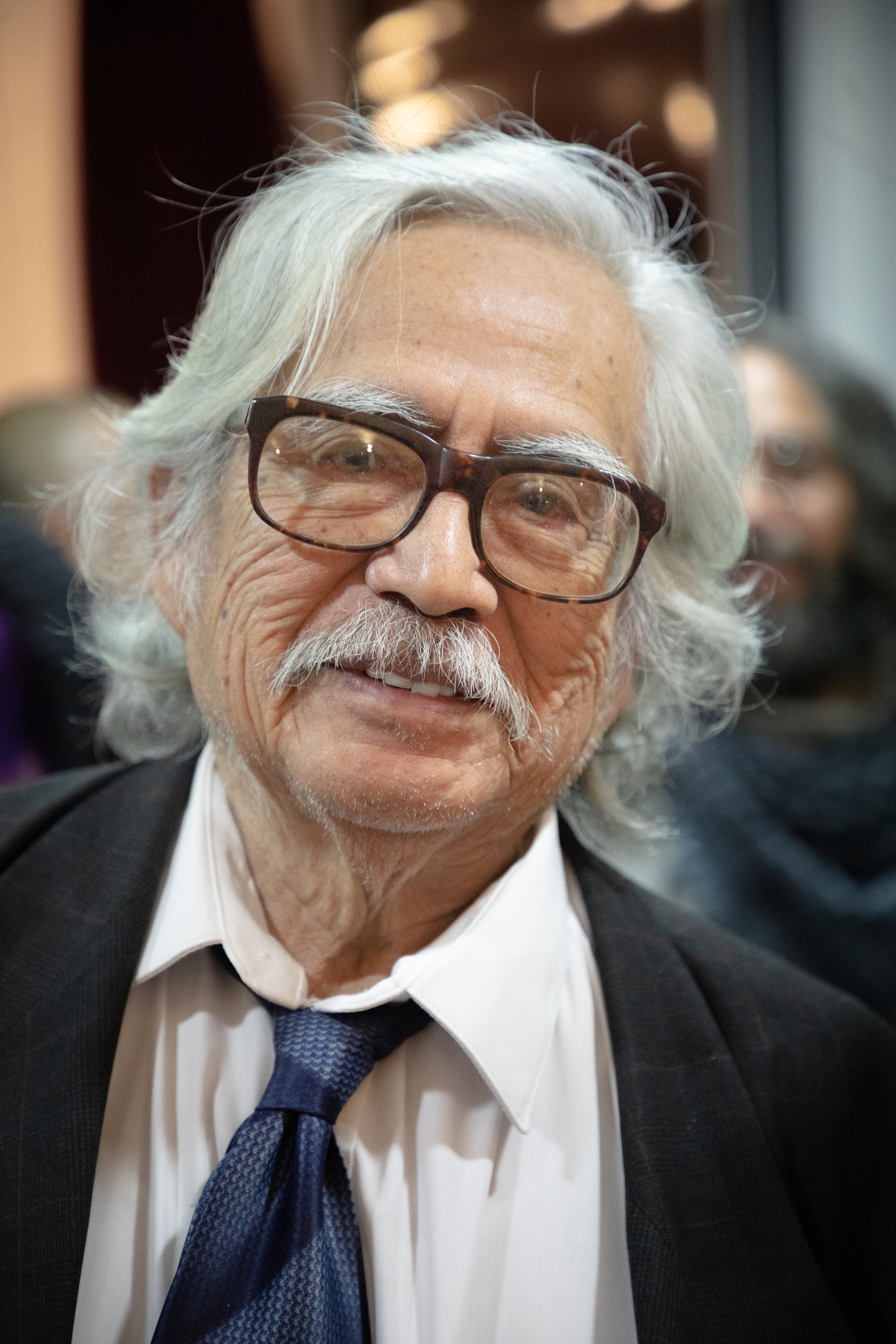
- Born: 7 November 1933; Veracruz, Mexico
- Died: 6 April 2024 (aged 90); Mexico City
- Occupation: Actor

Ernesto Gómez Cruz (7 November 1933 – 6 April 2024) was a Mexican actor with more than 154 film credits. At the time of his death, he was one of the last surviving stars from the Golden Age of Mexican Cinema.

Gómez was nominated several times for the Ariel Award. These included his acting in El infierno (2010), El crimen del padre Amaro (2002), El imperio de la fortuna by Arturo Ripstein (1987), La Víspera (1983), Cadena perpetua by Ripstein (1979), La venida del Rey Olmos by Julián Pastor (1975), and Rosa by José Estrada (1969).

Gómez died in Mexico City on 6 April 2024, at the age of 90.

At the 97th Academy Awards, his name was mentioned in the In Memoriam section.

== Selected filmography ==
- Reed: Insurgent Mexico (1973)
- Roots of Blood (1978)
- The Recourse to the Method (1978)
- Guerrilla from the North (1983)
- The Realm of Fortune (1986)
- Life Is Most Important (1987)
- Sandino (1990)
- Midaq Alley (1995)
- El infierno (2010)
