= Cadena temporal =

Legal punishment

Cadena temporal and cadena perpetua were legal punishments. Cadena temporal included imprisonment for at least 12 years and one day, in chains, at hard and painful labor; the loss of many basic civil rights; and subjection to lifetime surveillance. Cadena perpetua is identical except that it is a sentence of life as opposed to a temporary status.

== Terminology ==
The "title" of the punishment is actually descriptive, as cadena is a Spanish word meaning chain while temporal means impermanent or temporary, in addition to the meaning it shares with English and perpetua, means continuous in Latin and Spanish.

== Philippines ==
One of the places these punishments were provided for was the Philippine legal system. This was a result of the Spanish Penal Code of 1870, which was adopted due to the country having been a Spanish colony until 1898. Cadena temporal was among the penalties repealed in 1932 with the enactment of the Revised Penal Code of the Philippines.

== United States ==
The use of this colonial punishment has been reviewed by the U.S. Supreme Court in Weems v. United States, 217 U.S. 349 (1910). Derived from the Spanish penal Code, the punishment of "cadena temporal" was from twelve years and one day to twenty years (arts. 28 and 96), which 'shall be served' in certain 'penal institutions.' And it was provided that 'those sentenced to cadena temporal (and cadena perpetua) shall labor for the benefit of the state. They shall always carry a chain at the ankle, hanging from the wrists; they shall be employed at hard and painful labor, and shall receive no assistance whatsoever from without the institution.' There were, besides, certain accessory penalties imposed with it.

In Weems, the Supreme Court ruled this punishment to be "cruel and unusual" for a crime of "corruptly, and with intent then and there to deceive and defraud the United States government of the Philippine Islands and its officials, falsify[ing] a public and official document." Weems v. United States breaks away with the "historic method" of interpretation of the Eighth Amendment to the United States Constitution prohibiting such penalties. It thus paves the way to a modern interpretation of the Bill of Rights based on a new criterion: the "evolving standards of decency of a maturing society" designed by the Supreme Court in Trop v. Dulles, 356 U. S. 86 (1957).
