= Instituto Mexicano de Cinematografía =

Mexican Film Institute
- Instituto Mexicano de Cinematografía
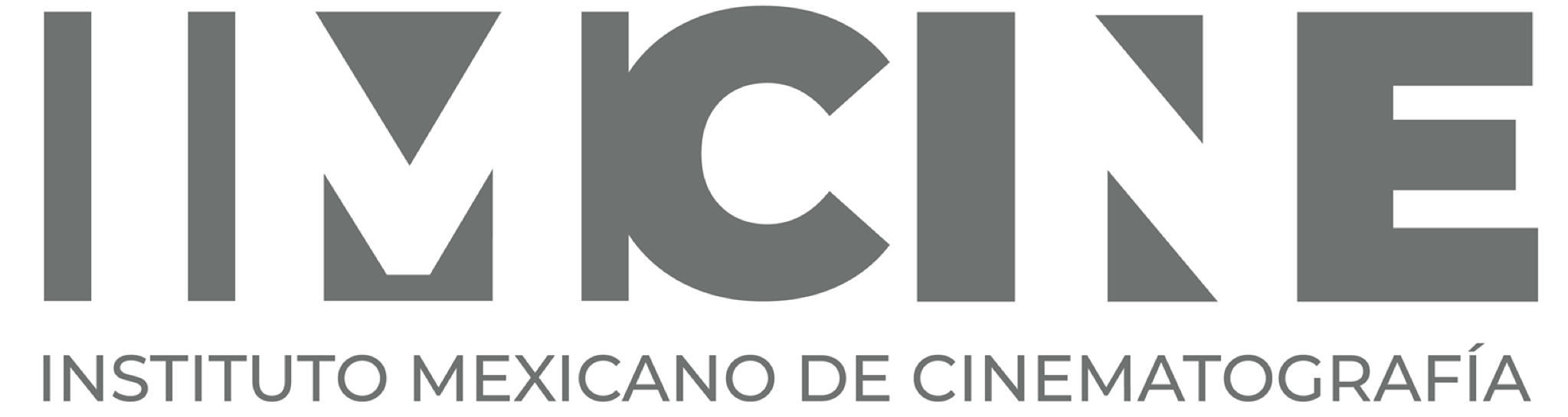

Agency overview
- Formed: March 25, 1983
- Parent agency: Secretariat of Culture
- Website: imcine.gob.mx

The Mexican Film Institute (Spanish: Instituto Mexicano de Cinematografía, IMCINE) is an agency of the Mexican federal government, under the auspices of the Secretariat of Culture, that supports the development of national film production and the film industry.

== History ==
IMCINE was established on March 25, 1983, alongside the Instituto Mexicano de la Radio and Instituto Mexicano de la Televisión. The goals of the agency are to promote and grow national film production; establish development policies; support the production and distribution of Mexican films in and out of the country; promote Mexican cinema worldwide; and support cinema itself by organizing events across the country.

The first director of IMCINE was director Alberto Isaac, who resigned in November 1985 because the agency could not get substantial financial backing or make its own executive decisions. In 1989, the agency was restructured and placed under the National Council for Culture and Arts (CONACULTA). After the restructuring, the agency became more successful in its efforts, with an increased presence of Mexican films and festivals and more event programming, and a new Federal Cinematography Law in 1992 that replaced previous legislation dating to 1949.

In the mid-2010s, the Mexican film industry improved dramatically, with 2017 setting a record for most films produced in the country with 176. Attendance also jumped from 65.2 million between 2006 and 2012 to 132.9 million.

== Programs ==
In 2014, of the 130 films produced in Mexico, 80 percent received government support through IMCINE. IMCINE funding programs include the Fund for Quality Cinema Production (FOPROCINE), the Cinema Investment and Stimulus Fund (FIDECINE) and the Fiscal Stimulus for National Film Production and Distribution (EFICINE).
