= Luis Estrada (director) =

Mexican film director

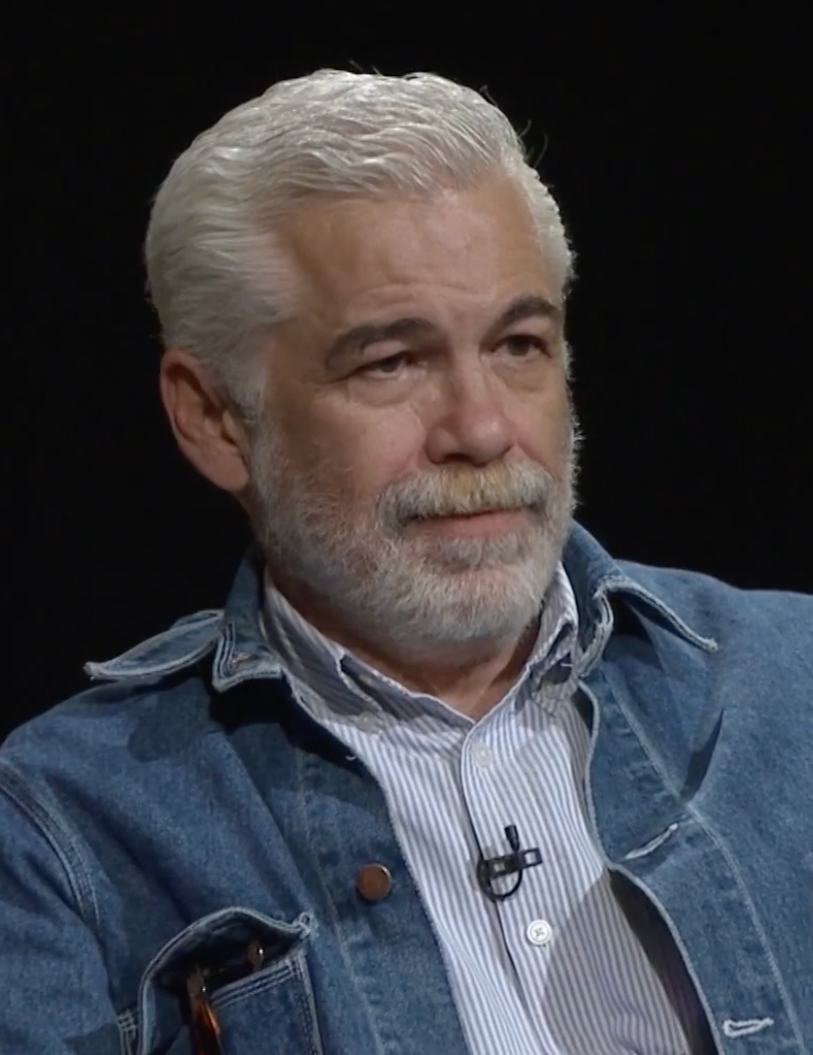
- Estrada in 2022
- Born: Luis Antonio Estrada Rodríguez; 17 January 1962 (age 64); Mexico City, Mexico
- Education: School of Philosophy and Letters; Centro Universitario de Estudios Cinematográficos
- Occupations: Film director; Film producer; Screenwriter
- Years active: 1981–present
- Relatives: José Estrada (father)

Luis Antonio Estrada Rodríguez (born 17 January 1962) is a Mexican film director, producer, and screenwriter. He is known for his films that openly criticize the Mexican political system and the controversial issues that revolve around it. He has been nominated for 10 Ariel Awards winning four of them, including two Best Director awards for Herod's Law (1999) and El Infierno (2010).

== Filmography ==
=== Film ===
Year	Title	Director	Producer	Writer	Editor
1988	Camino largo a Tijuana	Yes	Yes	No	No
1991	Bandidos	Yes	Yes	Yes	Yes
1994	Ámbar	Yes	Yes	Yes	Yes
1999	Herod's Law	Yes	Yes	Yes	Yes
2006	Un mundo maravilloso	Yes	Yes	Yes	Yes
2010	Hell	Yes	Yes	Yes	No
2014	The Perfect Dictatorship	Yes	Yes	Yes	No
2023	¡Que viva México!	Yes	Yes	Yes	No

=== Short film ===
Year	Title	Director	Writer	Editor
1981	Recuerdo de Xochimilco	Yes	No	Yes
1982	Andante spianato	Yes	Yes	Yes
1983	Laberinto cotidiano	No	No	Yes
1984	La divina Lola	Yes	Yes	Yes

=== Television ===
Year	Title	Director	Writer	Notes
1989	La hora marcada	Yes	Yes	Episode "El Motel"
2025	Las Muertas (The Dead Girls)	Yes	No	Six episodes

==== Other roles ====
Year	Title	Role	Notes
1981	La Pachanga	Second assistant director	
1981	Ángel del barrio	Assistant director	
1983	San ciudadano martir	Actor	Short film
1983	Cuarteto para el fin del mundo	Sound	Short film
1984	Nocaut	Assistant director	
1985	Historias violentas	Production assistant	
