= La dictadura perfecta =

- Theatrical release poster
- Spanish: La dictadura perfecta
- Directed by: Luis Estrada
- Written by: Luis Estrada; Jaime Sampietro
- Produced by: Luis Estrada
- Starring: Damián Alcázar; Alfonso Herrera; Joaquín Cosío; Dagoberto Gama; María Rojo; Salvador Sánchez
- Cinematography: Javier Aguirresarobe
- Edited by: Mariana Rodríguez
- Music by: Benson Taylor
- Production company: Bandidos Films
- Distributed by: Bandidos Films
- Release date: October 16, 2014
- Running time: 143 minutes
- Country: Mexico
- Language: Spanish
- Box office: over US$14 million (Mexico)

La dictadura perfecta (English: The Perfect Dictatorship) is a 2014 Mexican black comedy political satire film, written, produced and directed by Luis Estrada and starring Damián Alcázar, Alfonso Herrera, Joaquín Cosío, Dagoberto Gama, María Rojo and Salvador Sánchez. Cast also includes Osvaldo Benavides, Saúl Lisazo, Tony Dalton, Arath de la Torre, Sergio Mayer and Itatí Cantoral. It was released on October 16, 2014, and represented Mexico at the 2015 Goya Awards.

The film title is a reference to a famous statement by Peruvian Nobel laureate Mario Vargas Llosa that he used to describe the continuous governments of the Institutional Revolutionary Party (PRI), which dominated politics in Mexico for much of the 20th century. The plot is loosely based on the real life perceived Televisa controversy, which consisted of Mexican citizens heavily perceiving the news media was unfairly favoring PRI candidate Enrique Peña Nieto during the 2012 presidential election in Mexico.

== Plot ==
The President of Mexico (based on Enrique Peña Nieto) is accepting the credential cards of the new United States Ambassador. During his speech, he suggests to the ambassador that he tell President Barack Obama that he should consider allowing more Mexicans into the country as they can do jobs that "even black people didn't want." (based on a real quote by Vicente Fox). This causes a stir on social media, with millions of ordinary citizens posting and spreading memes about him.

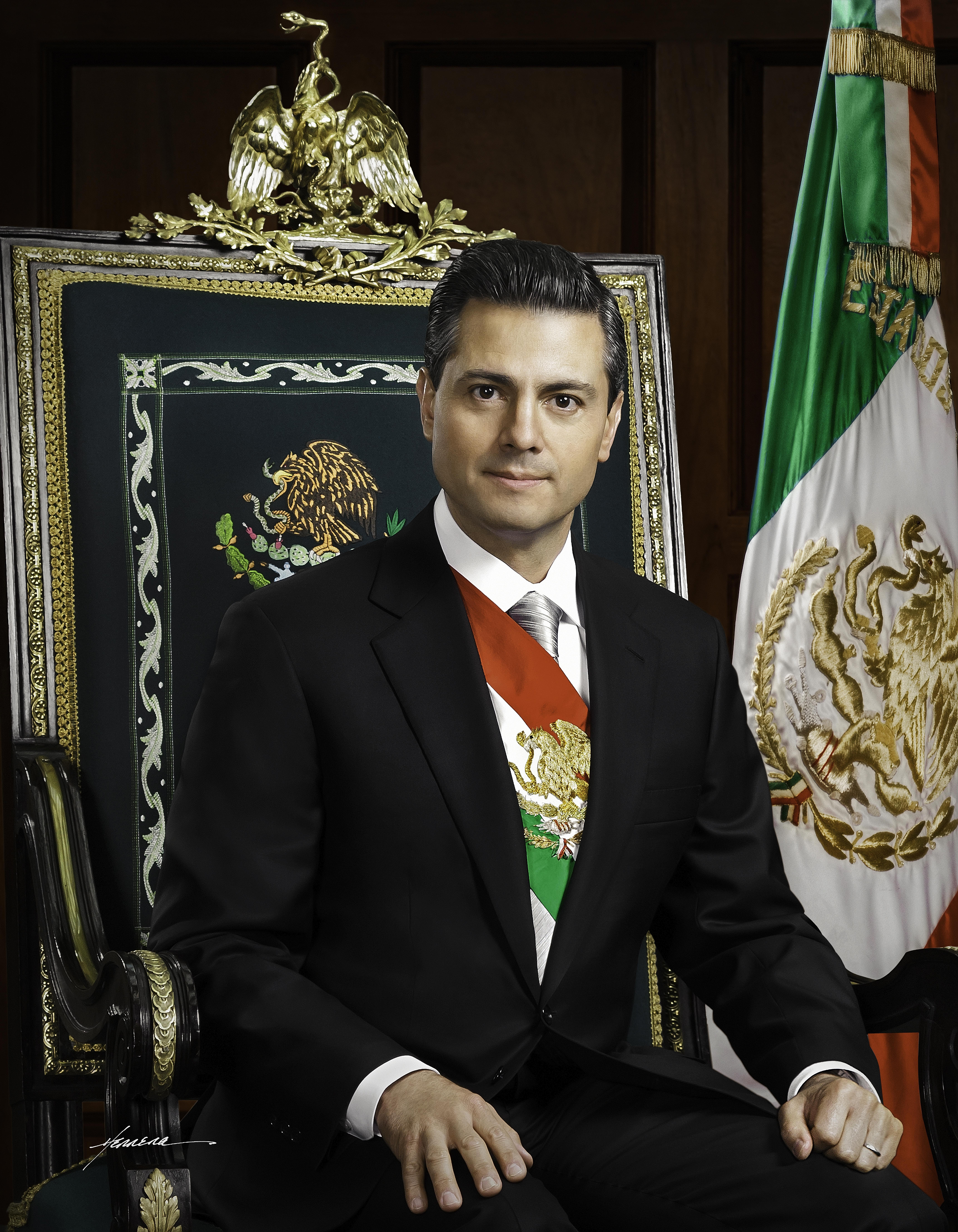
The film's unnamed President bears striking resemblance to then-president Enrique Peña Nieto

Later that day, officials of the Mexican government urge Television Mexicana, the most powerful television corporation, to create a media distraction by disclosing a scandalous story involving Governor Carmelo Vargas, airing a video where the governor is shown accepting bribes from drug lords, diverting the public's attention away from the president's gaffes.

In response, Governor Vargas decides to negotiate with Televisión Mexicana to repair his image. TV MX's news producer Carlos Rojo and star reporter Ricardo Diaz are sent to meet Vargas in an effort to improve his state's reputation. After being received by members of a drug cartel sent by the governor to protect them, Rojo meets a leader of the opposition party, Agustin Morales, who invites him to Congress where he delivers a speech calling for the governor's resignation. However, during the speech, Morales is shot. The group struggles to find positive news to uplift Vargas' image.

Meanwhile, Ana and Elena Garza, two twins, are kidnapped when their nanny is distracted. The information goes to the state police and TV MX decides to cover the situation in the newscast by making the parents of the children, Lucia and Salvador, sign an exclusivity contract, while Carmelo Vargas sent some detectives to fake some interest in the case. The case obtains high television ratings while simultaneously covering up all the problems in Vargas' government.

Recovered from the attempt on his life, Agustin Morales obtains contracts between TV MX with the governor from the Governor's godson. Morales blackmails Rojo into allowing him 10 minutes on the newscast to present his evidence of governmental corruption. However, the president's staff find evidence implicating Morales in child sexual abuse, and this is presented live on the channel before he can speak about his corruption allegations. Enraged by this, Morales physically attacks the news host and is removed from the studio. Later that night in his hotel, Morales is killed, with his death framed as a suicide by both the government and TV MX. Meanwhile, Vargas learns about what his spokesman did, so he personally kills his godson in front of Carlos.

When a witness recognizes who kidnapped the children, TV MX changes their strategy and begin in the newscast to ask the people to crowdfund the ransom the kidnappers are asking, with the governor himself donating a high sum (in exchange for being able to date Jazmin, Rojo's current girlfriend). However, Doña Chole, a member of the kidnappers, decides to bring the twins to the police and the Garza family decides to not give any more interviews to TV MX, leaving their reporting unfinished. So TV MX decides to make a fake montage over an operation of the government to rescue the girls and finally give the ending the people wanted to see, portraying Vargas as a hero and the Garza family supporting his heroic actions.

The next day, Díaz becomes the host of the newscast and Rojo is given an executive position at the news agency. Vargas decides to run for president while marrying Jazmin.

Two years later, Vargas wins the 2018 Mexican presidential election, under a grand coalition of three formerly opposed parties: the PRI, PAN and PRD.

== Cast ==
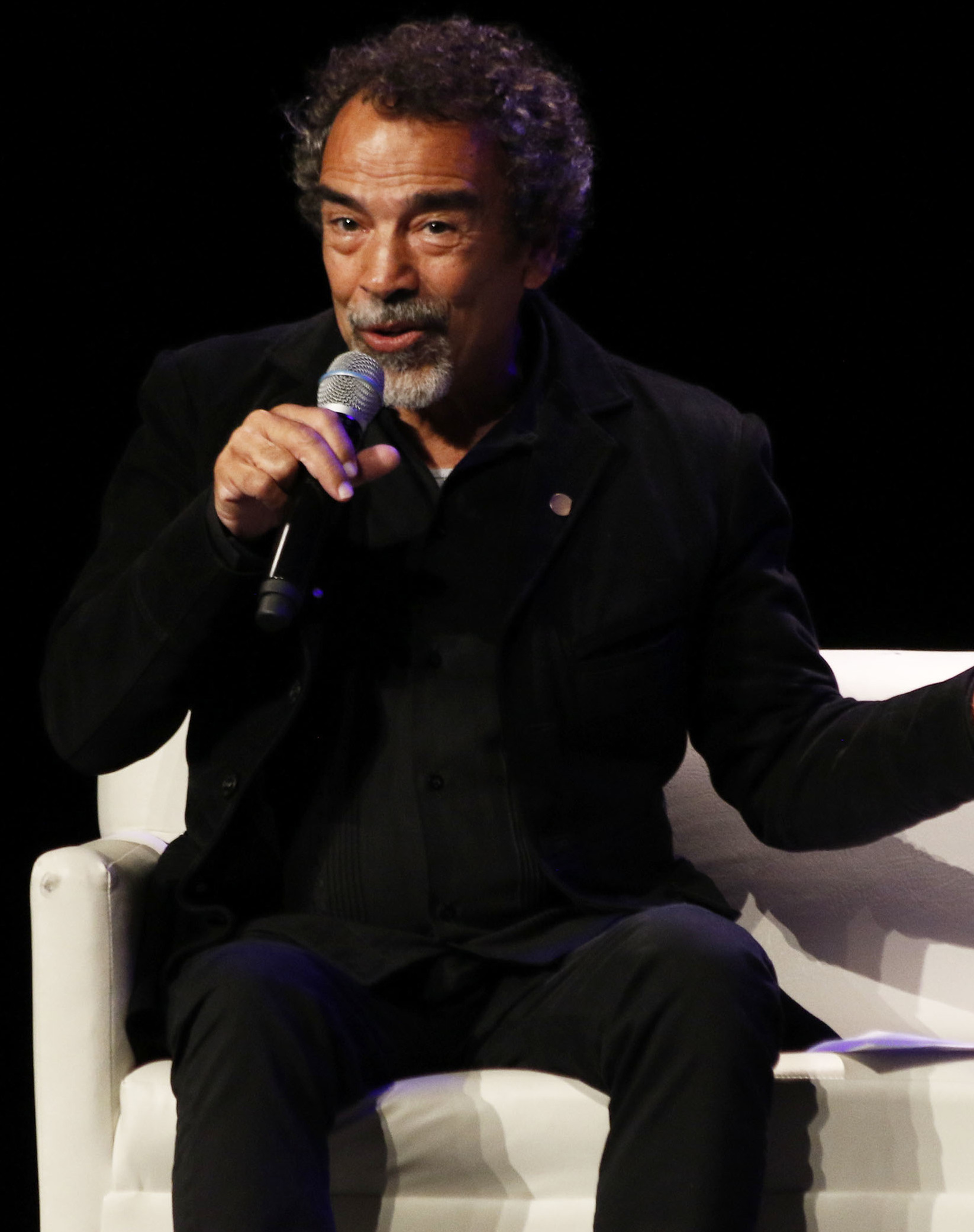
Alcázar in 2019

- Damián Alcázar as Governor Carmelo Vargas
- Alfonso Herrera as Producer Carlos Rojo
- Joaquín Cosío as Congressman Agustín Morales
- Osvaldo Benavides as Ricardo Díaz
- Silvia Navarro as Lucía de Garza
- Flavio Medina as Salvador Garza
- Saúl Lisazo as TV MX news anchor
- Tony Dalton as Director of TV MX (Pepe)
- Salvador Sánchez as X Man
- Enrique Arreola as Government Secretary
- Arath de la Torre as Speaker Poncho
- Dagoberto Gama as Mexico's Attorney General
- Noé Hernández as Chief of Security
- Sonia Couoh as Nana
- María Rojo as Doña Chole
- Luis Fernando Peña as El Chamoy
- Gustavo Sánchez Parra as El Charro
- Sergio Mayer as the President of Mexico
- Hernán Mendoza as El Mazacote
- Livia Brito as Jazmín
- Itatí Cantoral as Lucrecia Lascuráin
- Roger Cudney as Ambassador of the United States

== Themes and analysis ==
The plot of the film satirizes numerous political events which had happened in Mexico during the time period.

- Contracts between Televisa and PRI-PVEM: After the video scandals, Carmelo Vargas asks Televisión Mexicana (TV MX) for help in cleaning up his image and running for president. The corresponding contracts for this agreement are leaked, and Congressman Agustín Morales tries to make them public. In real life, similar contracts between Televisa and the campaign of Enrique Peña Nieto were leaked by The Guardian.
- The Paulette Gebara Farah case: TV MX decides to use the kidnapping of the Garza couple's daughters as a smokescreen, giving full coverage to cover up the attempted assassination of Morales and other crimes committed by Governor Vargas. This part was fictionally adapted to discuss the case of Paulette Gebara Farah, a sensationalized kidnapping case with many gaps during the judicial process and an implausible verdict. Like its film counterpart, the trial was continuously covered by the company Televisa. In the film, this process is known as "La Caja China" (The Chinese Box).
- Angélica Rivera: In order to collect the ransom money for the Garza family's daughters, the governor secretly asks the producer for a favor. Towards the end of the film, we see Governor Vargas campaigning for the presidency, accompanied by Jazmín, the star of a soap opera on the channel. She previously had a romantic relationship with producer Carlos Rojo, where apparently, both were already married. This reflects the image of actress Angélica Rivera, first with her marriage to producer Jose Alberto Castro, and later with her second marriage to President Enrique Peña Nieto.
- Video scandals: In the film, Governor Carmelo Vargas is seen receiving money from "El Mazacote," an alleged drug trafficker. This parallels the video that was shown on El Mañanero on March 3, 2004, in which René Bejarano is seen receiving wads of cash in a briefcase from Argentine businessman Carlos Ahumada.
- Ya ni los negros: This phrase was used by Vicente Fox during his administration. As in the film, it caused a stir because it was considered a racist comment.
- "Unidos por México" electoral alliance: During Carmelo Vargas' presidential campaign ad, the symbols of the PRI, PAN and PRD are shown. Curiously, six years after the film's release, the Va por México alliance was formed by these same three main parties for the 2021 Mexican legislative election and subsequent 2024 Mexican general election.

== Reception ==
=== Box office ===
In its opening weekend in Mexico, The Perfect Dictatorship grossed MXN$55.57 million, becoming the second highest-grossing Mexican film after Instructions Not Included. A month after its release, the film became the highest-grossing Mexican film of 2014 in Mexico and ranked third among the highest-grossing films of all time in the country, with $173,318,638 pesos at the box office and 3,833,393 attendees. In its seventh and final week of exhibition, the film grossed $188,160,777 and had 4,163,702 attendees. At a box office gross of $188.16 million, it is the tenth highest-grossing Mexican film of all time.

The logo of the real-life television network which inspired the film

== Awards and nominations ==
The film was chosen by the Mexican Academy of Cinematographic Arts and Sciences to represent Mexico at the 29th Goya Awards in 2015 in the Best Ibero-American Film category. On November 14, the Spanish Academy of Cinematographic Arts and Sciences announced a list of 15 shortlisted films, including The Perfect Dictatorship, representing Mexico. Finally, on January 7, 2015, it was announced that it did not make the final list of nominees. It ultimately received seven nominations for the Silver Goddess Awards, of which it only won the award for "Best Supporting Actor."

=== Ariel Awards ===
The Ariel Awards are awarded annually by the Mexican Academy of Film Arts and Sciences in Mexico. La Dictadura Perfecta received 10 nominations.

Year	Nominee / work	Award	Result
2015	La Dictadura Perfecta	Best Picture	Nominated
2015	Luis Estrada	Best Director	Nominated
2015	Luis Estrada	Best Original Screenplay	Nominated
2015	Jaime Sampietro	Best Original Screenplay	Nominated
2015	Santiago Núñez, Pablo Lach and Hugo de la Cerda	Best Sound	Nominated
2015	Mariana Rodríguez	Best Film Editing	Nominated
2015	Salvador Parra	Best Art Direction	Nominated
2015	Felipe Salazar	Best Makeup	Nominated
2015	Mariestela Fernández	Best Costume Design	Nominated
2015	Alejandro Vázquez	Best Special Effects	Nominated
2015	Adriana Arriaga	Best Visual Effects	Nominated
