= List of filmography and awards of Cecilia Suárez =

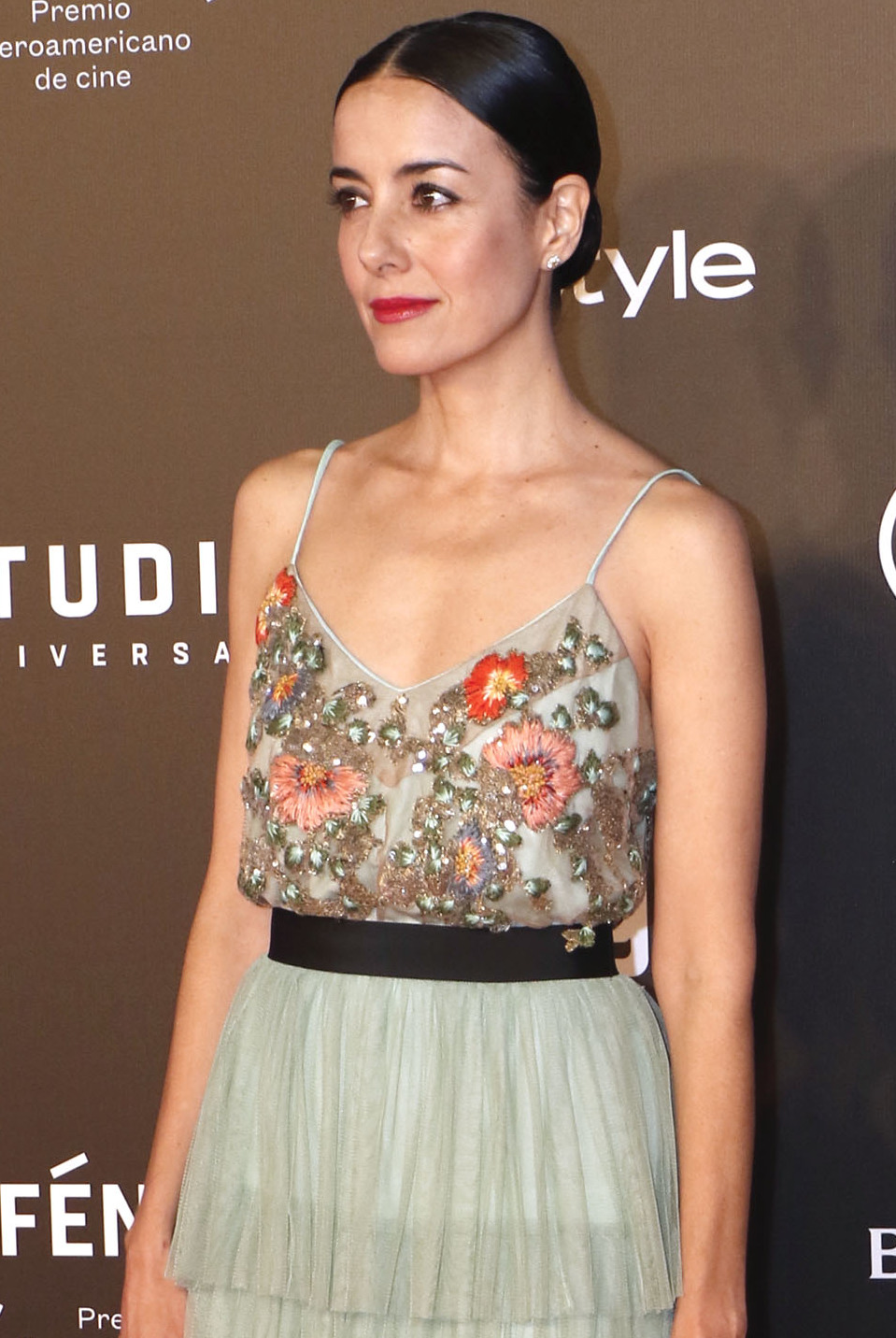
Suárez attending the 2017 Fénix Awards

Cecilia Suárez is a Mexican actress. She has starred in over 60 films and television shows since 1997, being nominated for her acting on 15 occasions. She has received two lifetime achievement awards for her film and TV career: one in Mexico and one in Spain; in Mexico she was the first woman to receive such an award.

Suárez has had over 30 theatrical roles since 1992, with multiple awards and nominations. She has received a lifetime achievement award for her theatre career.

== Filmography ==
=== Film roles ===
Year	Title	Role	Notes
pre-1995	Cuestion de minutos		Short
1997	Nic Habana		Short film
1998	Wash and Wear	Lucy	Short film
1999	Sexo, pudor y lágrimas	Andrea	
2000	Todo el poder	Sofía Aguirre	
2002	Moctezuma's Revenge	Pilar	
2003	Dreaming of Julia	Dulce	
2003	Sin ton ni Sonia	Renée	
2004	Puños rosas	Alicia	
2004	Charros		Short film
2004	Spanglish	Monica	
2005	The Three Burials of Melquiades Estrada	Rosa	
2005	Isy	Isy	Short film
2005	Chicken Little	Ugly Duckling (Abby)	(Latin American dub, voice)
2006	Sólo Dios sabe	Olivia	
2006	Un mundo maravilloso	Rosita	
2007	Párpados azules	Marina Farfán	Nominated — Ariel Award for Best Actress
2007	The Air I Breathe	Allison	
2007	Lección relámpago	Sofía	Short film
2007	El viaje de la nonna		
2007	Gente bien... atascada		Short film
2007	Karma		Short film
2008	Cinco días sin Nora	Bárbara Kurtz	
2010	Hidalgo: La historia jamás contada	Amadita	
2011	Nos vemos, papá	Pilar	
2012	El Santos vs. La Tetona Mendoza	Kikis Corcuera / The Hood	Voice
2013	No sé si cortarme las venas o dejármelas largas	Telenovela actress	Cameo
2013	Tercera llamada	Adrianita	
2013	Yo descubrí Yucatán		Short film
2014	The Obscure Spring	Flora	Nominated — Ariel Award for Best Supporting Actress
2014	Elvira, te daría mi vida pero la estoy usando	Elvira	Also executive producer
2015	Una Selfie		Short film
2016	Tales of an Immoral Couple	Martina	
2016	Macho	Alba	
2016	El Principito		Voice
2017	Cuando los hijos regresan	Carlota	
2017	Mariposas verdes	Bárbara	Colombian Film
2017	Coco	Tía Rosita	(Latin American dub, voice)
2018	Overboard	Magdalena Montenegro	
2018	Perfectos desconocidos	Eva	
2019	Klaus	Alva	(Spanish dub, voice)
2021	The House of Flowers: The Movie	Paulina de la Mora	
2021	Alegría	Alegría	
2021	La pasajera	Mariela	
2022	Sexo, pudor y lágrimas 2	Andrea	
2024	Puntos suspensivos (Ellipsis)	Victoria	

=== Television roles ===
Year	Title	Role	Notes
1997	Mi pequeña traviesa	Pily	Episode #1.1
1997	Table Dance		
1998	La casa del naranjo	Alicia Olmedo	Main cast; 75 episodes
1999	Cuentos para solitarios	Sandra	Episode: "Table Dance"
2000–2001	Todo por amor	Carmina "Mina" García Dávila	Lead role; 260 episodes
2001	Lo que callamos las mujeres	Elena	Episode: "La Lola enamorada"
2002	Fidel	Celia Sánchez	Television film
2002	For the People	Anita Lopez	16 episodes
2007	Boston Legal	Maria Delgadillo	Episode: "Duck and Cover"
2008	Mujeres asesinas	Ana Figueroa	Episode: "Ana, corrosiva"
2008	Tiempo final		
2008–2012	Capadocia	Valeria Molina / Aurelia Sosa "La Bambi"	Main cast; 26 episodes
2009	Medium	Maria Vargas	Episode: "About Last Night"
2010	Locas de amor	Juana Vázquez	25 episodes
2010	Gritos de muerte y libertad	Leona Vicario	
2011	El sexo débil	Alexandra Ezqueda	
2011	El encanto del águila / Revolución	Carmen Romero Rubio	3 episodes
2016–2017	Sense8	Lito's Manager	2 episodes
2017	El César	Tía Hilda	9 episodes
2018–2020	The House of Flowers	Paulina de la Mora	34 episodes (lead)
2019	Mami, una mujer ideal	Olivia	Piloto
2020	Someone Has To Die	Mina Falcón	Main role; 3 episodes
2024	Zorro	Guadalupe	
2025	The Gardener	La China Jurado	
2025	Serpientes y escaleras	Dora López-Negrete	

== Theatrical roles and accolades ==
Year	Title	Role	Notes
pre-1995	El Rabo		In Mexico
pre-1995	Silencio		In Mexico
pre-1995	Ludlow Fair		In Illinois
pre-1995	No Totem for My Story		In Illinois
1992	Summer and Smoke	Rosa	At the Allen Theatre
1993	The Macbeth Project	Lady Macbeth	In Illinois
1993	Orchids in the Moonlight	Dolores	At the Allen Theatre
1994-1995	Balm in Gilead	Rust	At the Allen Theatre
1994	The Good War		At the Breadline Theatre
1994	The Rover	Florinda	At the Westhoff Theatre
1995	The Crucible	Abigail Williams	With the Steppenwolf Theatre
1995	Cymbeline	Lady attending the Queen	In the Illinois Shakespeare Festival
1995	The Comedy of Errors	Luce and others	In the Illinois Shakespeare Festival
1995	Henry IV, Part 2	Tavern Lady and townspeople	In the Illinois Shakespeare Festival
1995-1996	Everyman		With the Steppenwolf Theatre
1996	Santos & Santos	Vicky Santos	In Chicago; with Teatro Vista
1996	A Christmas Carol	Belle	With the Goodman Theatre
1999	Popcorn	Scout	Received National Critics Award for Best Comedy Actress (Mexico); at the Teatro Lídice
2003	El Diccionario Sentimental	Marisa	At the Foro Sor Juana Inés de la Cruz
2004	Electricidad	Electra	Received an award; with the Goodman Theatre
	Santos & Santos		In Mexico; also co-producer
2007	Pequeñas certezas	Sofía	
2009	Othello	Emilia	Received an award; at Teatro Juan Ruiz de Alarcon
2012	Love Song		At Teatro Xola Julio Prieto
2013	Julius Caesar		
2013-2014	The Curious Incident of the Dog in the Night-Time	Siobhan Áa	Received an award; at Teatro de los Insurgentes
2014-2015	Bajo reserva	Silvia	At Teatro Sala Chopin
2015	Puntos suspensivos	Director	For MicroTeatro Por los Superhéroes
2016	Hermanas		Received an award; with La Rama del Teatro at Teatro López Tarso de la Ciudad de México
2016	White Rabbit Red Rabbit		One night; at La Teatrería
2016	Las Miserables		With Las Reinas Chulas at Teatro Bar El Vicio
2018	Testosterona		At Teatro El Granero "Xavier Rojas" del Centro Cultural del Bosque
2018	A Doll's House, Part 2	Nora	Nominated for Best Actress; at Teatro de los Insurgentes
2018	Nassim	Nassim	One night; at Nuevo Teatro Silvia Pinal

== Awards and nominations for film and television ==
=== Ariel Awards ===
Suárez has twice been nominated for an Ariel Award, the Mexican Academy of Film awards.

Year	Work	Category	Result	Ref
2008	Párpados azules	Best Actress	Nominated	
2015	Las oscuras primaveras	Best Supporting Actress	Nominated	

=== Bravo Awards ===
Suárez has won a Bravo television award.

Year	Work	Category	Result	Ref
2001	Todo por amor	Best Supporting Actress	Won	

=== Emmy Awards ===
Suárez has been nominated for one International Emmy Award.

Year	Work	Category	Result	Ref
2009	Capadocia	Best Actress	Nominated	

=== Diosas de Plata ===
Suárez has been nominated for two Diosas de Plata, the Mexican Film Journalists' award, winning one.

Year	Work	Category	Result	Ref
2007	Un mundo maravilloso	Best Supporting Actress	Won	
2016	Elvira, te daría mi vida pero la estoy usando	Best Actress	Nominated	

=== Guadalajara International Film Festival ===
Suárez has twice won an award at the Guadalajara International Film Festival.

Year	Work	Category	Result	Ref
2007	Párpados azules	Press Award for Best Actress	Won	
2013	Tercera llamada	Best Actress	Won	

=== Lleida Latin-American Film Festival ===
Suárez has won once at the Lleida Latin-American Film Festival.

Year	Work	Category	Result	Ref
2007	Párpados azules	Best Actress	Won	

=== Miami International Film Festival ===
Suárez has won one Grand Jury Prize at the Miami International Film Festival.

Year	Work	Category	Result	Ref
2015	Las oscuras primaveras	Best Performance	Won	

=== MTV Movie & TV Awards ===
Suárez has been nominated for an MTV Movie Award on two consecutive occasions.

Year	Work	Category	Result	Ref
2004	Sin ton ni sonia	Best Actress	Nominated	
2005	Puños rosas	Best Actress	Nominated	

=== Platino Awards ===
Suárez has won one Platino Award, the Ibero-American film and television awards.

Year	Work	Category	Result	Ref
2019	The House of Flowers	Best Actress in a Miniseries or Television series	Won	
2020	The House of Flowers	Best Actress in a Miniseries or Television series	Won	

=== Premios Canacine ===
Suárez has been nominated for two Premios Canacine.

Year	Work	Category	Result	Ref
2014	Nos vemos, papá	Best Actress	Nominated	
2017	La vida inmoral de la pareja ideal	Best Actress	Nominated	
