= Eduardo Victoria =

Mexican actor

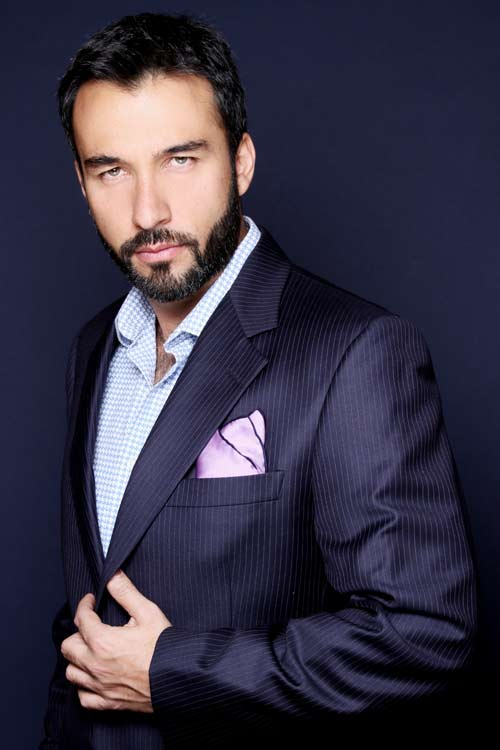
- Born: Eduardo Victoria Samperio; September 7, 1970 (age 54); Mexico City, Mexico
- Occupation: Actor
- Years active: 2000−present
- Spouse: Tania Arredondo (2000–present)

Eduardo Victoria (born September 7, 1970) is a Mexican actor.

== Filmography ==
=== Film roles ===
Year	Title	Role	Notes
2000	El precio de nuestra sangre	Enrique	
2001	Hermanos de sangre	Ramón	
2003	El secreto oculto	Emilio	
2007	The Air I Breathe	Banker #1	
2007	El último justo	Longinos	
2009	El cártel	Carlitos	
2010	El efecto tequila	José Fierro	
2012	Hotel Garage	Himserlf	Producer
2013	Mi mejor regalo	Papá de Jessica	

=== Television roles ===
Year	Title	Role	Notes
2001	Amores, querer con alevosía	Antonio Redondo	22 episodes
2001	Lo que callamos las mujeres	Julio	2 episodes
2001–2002	Lo que es el amor	Carlos	68 episodes
2002	El país de las mujeres	El Alebrije	
2003	La hija del jardinero	Leopoldo Araoz	
2004	Belinda	Pablo Noriega	
2005	Los plateados	Andrés Castañeda	
2005	Corazón partido	Julio Garinca	
2006	Marina	Federico Santibáñez	
2008	Decisiones	Rodrigo	Episode: "Mi querido padrastro"
2009	The Disorderly Maids of the Neighborhood	Joaquín Saldaña	
2010	Persons Unknown	Secretary	Episode: "Incoming"
2010	Las Aparicio	Claudio Robles	120 episodes
2010	Bienes raíces	Pablo Escalante	13 episodes
2011	Bienvenida realidad	Santiago Estrada	
2012	La ruta blanca	Coronel Cabral	
2012	Último año	Julio Ruíz	
2012	Lado B	Novio de Pam	Television film
2013	Historias de la Virgen Morena	Bruno	Episode: "Justicia divina"
2013	Gossip Girl: Acapulco	Marcelo Parra	26 episodes
2014	Nora	Daniel Moros	
2014–2015	Tierra de reyes	Néstor Fernández	132 episodes
2016	La viuda negra	Unknown	
2016–2018	Rosario Tijeras	Luis Enrique Bethancourt	61 episodes
2017	Nada personal	Arturo Quevedo	
2017	Érase una vez	Sergio Montiel	Episode: "The Prince and the Pauper"
2019	Preso No. 1	Francisco Canales	
