= Lina Marín =

Mexican actress

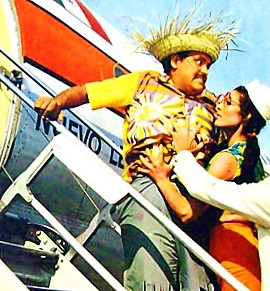
- Capulina (left) and Lina Marín (right) in El bueno para nada (1973)
- Born: Felipa Cartas Orozco; August 12, 1944; Unión Hidalgo, Oaxaca, Mexico
- Died: 23 June 1989 (aged 44); Mexico City, Mexico
- Occupation: Actress
- Years active: 1966–1987
- Children: 2

Felipa Cartas Orozco (August 12, 1944 – June 23, 1989), known professionally as Lina Marín, was a Mexican actress of Zapotec descent. She was known for her performance in the film A Man Called Horse (1970) and for her starring role opposite Gaspar Henaine "Capulina" in El bueno para nada (1973).

== Biography ==
Marín was born Felipa Cartas Orozco in the region of the Isthmus of Tehuantepec on August 12, 1944, in the municipality of Unión Hidalgo, Oaxaca. At age 14 she moved to Mexico City, where she began her acting career with a small role in the drama film El derecho de nacer in 1966.

She had prominent supporting roles in La marcha a Zacatecas and El último pistolero (both 1969) before playing a Sioux Indian named Thorn Rose in A Man Called Horse (1970), the film that gave her international exposure.

She also acted in Espérame en Siberia, vida mía (1971), with Mauricio Garcés; Chanoc contra el tigre y el vampiro (1972), with Gregorio Casal; Tacos al carbon (1972), with Vicente Fernández; El rey de Acapulco (1972), with Capulina; and El Payo - un hombre contra el mundo (1972), with Jorge Rivero.

Her greatest achievement in Mexican cinema was her performance in her second film co-starring Capulina, El bueno para nada (1973), in which she played the main female role: María, Capulina's Native Mexican girlfriend who works as a maid in the house of Susana Alexander and Pancho Córdova. Her performance showed that, in addition to being a great beauty, she also had talent for comedy.

She returned to acting in the mid-1980s with a supporting role in the film Lo que importa es vivir (1987).

She died of breast cancer on June 23, 1989 at age 44, and is survived by two children.

== Legacy ==
A movie theater in the Herón Ríos Cultural Center in Juchitán de Zaragoza bears her name.

In 2016, she was honored with a mural and a short film in Unión Hidalgo, her hometown.

== Selected filmography ==
- Sube y baja (1959)
- La reina del cielo (1959) - Indigena (uncredited)
- Dos caballeros de espada (1964) - Mesonera (uncredited)
- The Golden Cockerel (1964) - Fermina (uncredited)
- El derecho de nacer (1966)
- Me quiero casar (1967) - Lupe, sirvienta
- Don Juan 67 (1967)
- Despedida de casada (1968)
- Patrulla de valientes (1968)
- Corona de lágrimas (1968) - María Álvarez (uncredited)
- Los amores de Juan Charrasqueado (1968) - Lucía
- Blue Demon contra cerebros infernales (1968)
- Romeo contra Julieta (1968) - Sirvienta
- Cinco en la cárcel (1968) - Lupe
- El matrimonio es como el demonio (1969) - Coco
- Cuernos debajo de la cama (1969)
- La marcha a Zacatecas (1969)
- El último pistolero (1969)
- Las pirañas aman en cuaresma (1969)
- A Man Called Horse (1970) - Thorn Rose
- El oficio mas antiguo del mundo (1970) - Gumersinda
- Ya somos hombres (1971) - Sirvienta
- Los novios (1971) - Cabaretera de Rojo
- Espérame en Siberia, vida mía (1971) - Lupe
- Pubertinaje (1971) - (segment "Una cena de navidad")
- El medio pelo (1972) - Rutila
- Chanoc contra el tigre y el vampiro (1972) - Cristina
- Tacos al carbón (1972) - Margarita Rodríguez
- El rey de Acapulco (1972) - Coco / Torcuata
- El Payo - un hombre contra el mundo (1972) - Doloritas
- Besos, besos... y mas besos (1973) - (segment "La señora, la criada y el señor")
- El bueno para nada (1973) - María
- Lo que importa es vivir (1987) - Crucita
- El chacal (1987) - (final film role)
