= Arleta Jeziorska =

Mexican actress

Arleta Jeziorska (Spanish pronunciation: [aɾˈleta ʝeˈsjoɾska]; born 1970) is a Mexican actress of films and telenovelas. She was born in Poland.

== Telenovelas ==
- La duda (2002) as Florenza
- Uroboros (2001) as Esposa
- Lo que es el amor (2001) asTere (Christian's biological mother)
- Demasiado corazón (1998) as Gisella
- El amor de tu vida S.A. (1996) as Dalias

== Films ==
- Nicolás (1994)
- Miroslava (1993) as Miroslava (young)
