= Sexo, amor y otras perversiones =

- Directed by: Carlos Carrera; Daniel Gruener; Gustavo Loza; Carolina Rivera; María Fernanda Suárez; Gerardo Tort; Ángel Flores Torres; Javier 'Fox' Patrón; Carlos Sariñana
- Produced by: Carlos Sariñana
- Starring: Tiaré Scanda; Claudia Ramírez; Ana Serradilla; Carlos Torres Torrija; Fernando Carrillo; Patricia Llaca; Martha Higareda; Arcelia Ramírez
- Release date: 2006
- Country: Mexico
- Language: Spanish

Sexo, amor y otras perversiones (Spanish for "Sex, love and other perversions") is a 2006 Mexican film made up of eight short films directed by several Mexican film directors:

- Carlos Carrera (segment "Barbacoa de Chivo")
- Daniel Gruener
- Gustavo Loza
- Carolina Rivera
- María Fernanda Suárez
- Gerardo Tort
- Ángel Flores Torres (segment "Recompensa")
- Javier 'Fox' Patrón (segment "El Auto")
- Carlos Sariñana (segment "A una Mujer Decente")

== Cast ==
- Tiaré Scanda as Mayán
- Claudia Ramírez as a blond woman
- Ana Serradilla as Mirtha (segment "Por Amor")
- Carlos Torres Torrija as Lucio
- Fernando Carrillo as Rodrigo
- Patricia Llaca as Elena
- Martha Higareda as María
- Arcelia Ramírez

== Plot ==
Tagline: "Which one is your depravation?"

Eight stories ranging from the story of a woman who awakes at an unknown person's apartment to the rejoining of two underground lovers. From the warm flirtings of two women to a girl captive in an elevator. Other stories are tied among these: a female teacher who is flirted by one of her students; a teenager's deception that joins again with her best friend from secondary school: the adventure of two porn actors who find love, and the amusing plans of a single man who just wishes to be kind with his old mother...

From the producer and director of Todo el poder, and Cero y van cuatro, Fernando Sariñana.
