= Nora's Will =

- Film poster
- Directed by: Mariana Chenillo
- Written by: Mariana Chenillo
- Produced by: Mariana Chenillo; Laura Imperiale
- Starring: Fernando Luján; Cecilia Suárez; Ari Brickman; Enrique Arreola; Angelina Peláez
- Cinematography: Alberto Anaya
- Edited by: Mariana Chenillo; Óscar Figueroa
- Music by: Dario González Valderrama
- Production company: Cacerola Films
- Distributed by: David Distribution
- Release date: 6 October 2008
- Running time: 92 minutes
- Country: Mexico
- Language: Spanish

Nora's Will (Spanish: Cinco días sin Nora, also released as Five Days Without Nora) is a 2008 Mexican black comedy-drama film written and directed by Mariana Chenillo. It was entered into the 31st Moscow International Film Festival.

== Plot ==
Nora commits suicide in a timely way consistent with her plan to bring her ex-husband, José (Luján), and the rest of their family together for a Passover together.

A photograph from the past, hidden under the bed, leads Jose to reexamine their relationship.

This story begins when José finds out that Nora, the woman he'd been married to for 30 years and then divorced, has committed suicide. The rabbi tasked with Nora's burial explains to José that due to the celebration of the Passover festivities, together with a few other factors, if Nora is not buried that same day, they will have to wait almost five days to be able to carry out the burial. It turns out that before she died, Nora devised a Machiavellian plan in order for him to take care of her funeral. The film follows José as he has to navigate the clash between his atheistic beliefs and his family's Jewish religion, and his own past with Nora.

== Cast ==
- Enrique Arreola as Moisés
- Ari Brickman as Rubén
- Juan Carlos Colombo as Dr. Nurko
- Marina de Tavira as Young Nora
- Max Kerlow as Rabbi Jacowitz
- Verónica Langer as Aunt Leah
- Martin LaSalle as Rabbi Kolatch
- Fernando Luján as José
- Silvia Mariscal as Nora
- Fermín Martínez as Doorman
- Juan Pablo Medina as Young José
- Arantza Moreno as Paola
- Vanya Moreno as Laura
- Angelina Peláez as Fabiana
- Cecilia Suárez as Bárbara
- Daniela Tarazona as Sales woman

== Reception ==
=== Critical reception ===
Review aggregator Rotten Tomatoes gives the film a score of 89% based on reviews from 35 critics, with an average rating of 7.16/10.

=== Awards ===
Biarritz Festival Latin America,

- Best Film

Expresión en Corto International Film Festival,

- Best First Film

Havana Film Festival,

- Grand Coral - Third Prize

Huelva Latin American Film Festival,

- Best Actor (Fernando Luján)

Los Angeles Latino International Film Festival,

- Jury Award for Best Director and Best First film

Mar del Plata International Film Festival,

- Best Film

Miami International Film Festival,

- Audience Award

Morelia International Film Festival,

- Audience Award

Moscow International Film Festival,

- Silver St. George (Best Director)

Skip City International D-Cinema Festival,

- Best Screenplay
