= Miroslava (film) =

- Directed by: Alejandro Pelayo
- Written by: Vicente Leñero; Guadalupe Loaeza
- Produced by: Miguel Necoechea; Grazia Rade; Alma Rossbach; Alejandro Pelayo
- Starring: Arielle Dombasle; Claudio Brook; Milosh Trnka; Arleta Jeziorska
- Cinematography: Emmanuel Lubezki
- Edited by: Óscar Figueroa
- Music by: José Amozurrutia
- Production company: Aries Films
- Release date: 8 April 1993
- Running time: 100 minutes
- Country: Mexico
- Language: Spanish

Miroslava is a 1993 Mexican drama film directed by Alejandro Pelayo and starring Arielle Dombasle, Claudio Brook and Milosh Trnka. The film portrays the life of the Czech-born actress Miroslava, who became one of the biggest stars in Mexico before her suicide in 1955.

== Partial cast ==
- Arielle Dombasle as Adult Miroslava
- Claudio Brook as Alex Fimman
- Milosh Trnka as Dr. Oscar Stern
- Arleta Jeziorska as Young Miroslava
- Evangelina Martinez as Rosario
- Pamela Sniezhkin Brook as Child Miroslava
- Verónica Langer as Miroslava's Mother
- Rosa María Bianchi as Sofía
- Josefo Rodríguez as Luis Miguel Dominguín
- Alicia Laguna as Graciela
- Demián Bichir as Ricardo
- Miguel Pizarro as Jesús Jaime
- Brígida Alexander as Miroslava's Grandmother
- Juan Carlos Colombo as Dr. Pascual Roncal
- Eugenia Leñero as Eugenia
- Raúl Izaguirre as Ernesto Alonso
- Esteban Plácido Mealaza as Luis Buñuel

== Bibliography ==
- Montes Garcés, Elizabeth. Relocating Identities in Latin American Cultures. University of Calgary Press, 2007.
