= Óscar Figueroa =

Óscar Figueroa may refer to:

- Óscar Figueroa (film editor) (born 1958), Mexican film editor
- Óscar Figueroa (weightlifter) (born 1983), Colombian weightlifter
