= Belinda (TV series) =

- Developed by: TV Azteca
- Directed by: Luis Alberto Lamatta; Sergio Treviño; Freddy García; Johnny Solórzano
- Starring: Leonardo Garcia; Mariana Torres
- Opening theme: "Amor Mio" by Tres de Copas
- Country of origin: Mexico
- Original language: Spanish
- No. of episodes: 105

Production
- Running time: 45 minutes
- Production company: TV Azteca

Original release
- Network: Azteca Trece
- Release: April 26 – September 17, 2004

Belinda (For You) is a Mexican telenovela that aired in 2004 on TV Azteca's Azteca 13. It starred Leonardo Garcia and Mariana Torres as protagonists.

== Cast ==
=== Main protagonists ===
Actor	Character	Known as
Mariana Torres	Belinda Arismendi	Main heroine. Daughter of Roberto and Cristina, in love with Ricardo
Leonardo Garcia	Ricardo Semprum Latorre	Main hero. Son of Adolfo
Héctor Bonilla	Roberto Arismendi	Father of Anabela and Belinda, husband of Lucrecia
Anna Ciocchetti	Lucrecia Fuenmayor de Arismendi	Villain. Wife of Roberto; mother of Anabela and Alfredo
Sebastián Ligarde	Adolfo Semprum Inchaustegui	Villain. Father of Ricardo, Helena and Alfredo
Regina Torne	Eloisa Fuenmayor	Mother of Lucrecia and Renata
Laura Padilla	Renata Fuenmayor	Daughter of Eloisa, sister of Lucrecia, mother of Gustavo
Gabriela Vergara	Cristina Romero / Belinda Romero	Mother of Belinda / Sister of Cristina, aunt of Belinda Arismendi

=== Other cast ===
Actor	Character	Known as
Tamara Monserrat	Anabela Arismendi	Villain. Daughter of Lucrecia and Roberto, girlfriend of Ricardo
Luis Arrieta	Alfredo Arismendi	Son of Lucrecia and Adolfo
Elba Jiménez	Helena Semprum	Daughter of Adolfo, sister of Ricardo and Alfredo
Calos Mata	Dr. Alfonso Rivas	Doctor, friend of Roberto, godfather of Belinda
Rodrigo Cachero	Gustavo Flores	Adopted son of Teresa, son of Renata
Irene Arcila	Teresa Flores	
Tania Arredondo	Coraima Valdez	Maid in Lucrecia's house, in love with Alfredo
Carmen Delgado	Gardenia Valdez	Housekeeper in Lucrecia's house
Alberto Casanova	Ernesto Marin	Villain. Brother of Osvaldo
Alejandro Lukini	Osvaldo Marin	Colleague of Roberto, brother of Ernesto
Aarón Beas	Ruben Fuentes	
Adriana Cataño	Jacqueline Tovar	
Andres Palacios	Jesus Infante	
Eduardo Victoria	Pablo Noriega	Colleague of Roberto
Elsa Aguirre		
Graciela Orozco		
Jesus Vargas		Doctor
Jorge Levi	Enrique Flores	Husband of Teresa
Jorge Caceres	Martin Reyes	Professor
María Colla		
María Rebeca	Patricia 'Paty'	Colleague of Roberto
Marcela Ruiz Esparza	Veronica	Friend of Belinda
Mariana Urrutia	Hayde	
Omar Germenos		
Seraly Morales	Gaby	Colleague of Ricardo

== Theme song ==
=== Amor Mio ===
Singers

- Tres de Copas

Writers

Adaptation

Editor
