= Tamara Monserrat =

Mexican actress of film and television

- Born: Palma de Mallorca, Spain
- Occupation: Actress

Tamara Monserrat is a Mexican actress of film and television, primarily known for starring in several telenovelas.

== Biography ==
=== Early life ===
Born in Palma de Mallorca, Spain, Monserrat is the daughter of Mallorcan businessman Jaime Monserrat.

=== Career ===
Monserrat began her acting career in the Centro de Formación Actoral de la Televisión Azteca in Mexico and has taken several acting courses at the School of Acting of the prestigious actress Patricia Reyes Spíndola.

She debuted as an actress in 2002 in the telenovela Por tí. In 2005 she got her first leading role in Telemundo's telenovela Los Plateados starring together with Mauricio Islas, Dominika Paleta and Humberto Zurita.

== Filmography ==
Television & Movies
Year	Project	Role	Notes
2007	Shirgo (La leyenda del Cagalar)	Regina	
2005	Los Plateados	Camila Castañeda	protagonist
2004	Mirada de mujer: El regreso	Lorenza	
2003	Enamórate	Consuelo	
2003	Lo que es el amor	Amparo	
2002	Por tí	Helena	antagonist
