= El bueno para nada =

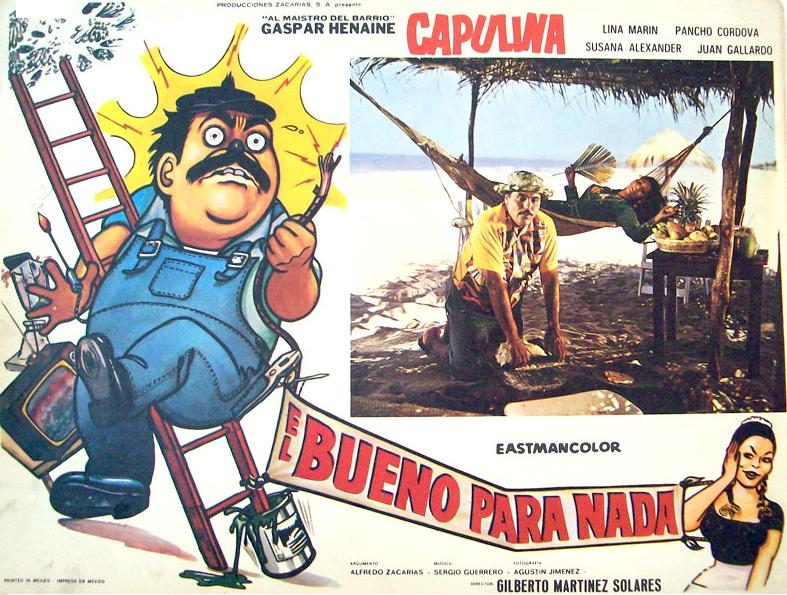
- Theatrical release lobby card
- Directed by: Gilberto Martínez Solares
- Written by: Alfredo Zacarías
- Produced by: Miguel Zacarías
- Starring: Gaspar Henaine «Capulina» Lina Marín; Susana Alexander; Ivonne Govea
- Cinematography: Agustín Jiménez
- Edited by: Eufemio Rivera
- Music by: Sergio Guerrero
- Production company: Producciones Zacarías
- Release date: July 26, 1973 (Mexico)
- Running time: 85 minutes
- Country: Mexico
- Language: Spanish

El bueno para nada ("The Good for Nothing") is a 1973 Mexican comedy film produced by Miguel Zacarías, written by Alfredo Zacarías, directed by Gilberto Martínez Solares and starring Gaspar Henaine «Capulina», Lina Marín, Susana Alexander and Ivonne Govea. This film marked the first starring role of the actress Lina Marín as his romantic interest, who first appeared in El rey de Acapulco (1972); her performance showed that, in addition to being a great beauty, Marín also had talent for comedy.

== Cast ==
- Gaspar Henaine as Capulina Mantecón
- Lina Marín as María: Capulina's girlfriend and the Saldañas' housemaid.
- Susana Alexander as Carolina Saldaña: Benigno's wife and María's employer.
- Pancho Córdova as Benigno Saldaña: Carolina's husband and María's employer.
- Ivonne Govea as wife of the jealous husband.
- Juan Gallardo as police inspector of the Procuraduría General de la República.
- Enrique Pontón as Otto I: Inventor of a machine capable of causing earthquakes.

== Production ==
Principal photography for El bueno para nada commenced in April 1970. Filming locations included Estudios Churubusco, Mexico City, and Acapulco, Guerrero.

== Release ==
El bueno para nada premiered on July 26, 1973 (nearly three years after its production) in a total of fourteen Mexico City cinemas for five weeks.
