= Patricia Llaca =

Mexican actress

Patricia Llaca is a Mexican actress who has participated both in films, soap operas and TV shows. She is also sometimes credited as Patricia De Llaca.

She is best known for her role as Andrea in the film La Habitación Azul.

Since 2005, Llaca has hosted the TV Show Animal Nocturno alongside Mexican journalist Ricardo Rocha.

== Filmography ==
- Casi divas (2008) .... Eva
- Llamando a un Angel (2008)
- Efectos Secundarios (2006) .... La Chule
- Sexo, amor y otras perversiones (2006) .... Elena
- "Una de balazos" (2005) (Video) .... Femme Fatale
- Animal nocturno (2005) TV Series .... Host
- Llamando a un Angel (2007) .... Eva Figueroa
- Cero y van cuatro (2004) .... Julieta ("Vida Express")
- Mirada de mujer: El regreso (2003) TV Series .... Verónica
- Tú mataste a Tarantino (2003)
- La Habitación Azul (2002) .... Andrea
- Fidel (2002) (TV) .... American Woman
- Lo que es el amor (2001) TV Series .... Alex Palacios
- Beat (2000) (as Patricia De Llaca) .... Mary
- Alguien vio a Lola? (2000)
- Todo por amor (2000) TV Series .... Raquel
- Ajos y cebollas (1999)
- Al borde (1998) .... Amanda
- El Amor de mi vida (1998) TV Series .... Angela
- Un baúl lleno de miedo (1997) .... Laura Toledo
- La gente ya no escribe (1996)

== Awards ==
She was nominated to have acted on the "Sexiest Scene" for La Habitación Azul shared with her companion Juan Manuel Bernal.
