= Dominika Paleta =

Polish-Mexican actress (born 1972)

- Born: Dominika Paleta Paciorek; October 23, 1972 (age 54); Kraków, Poland
- Other name: Dominika Paleta de Ibarra
- Citizenship: Poland, Mexico
- Education: Universidad Iberoamericana
- Occupation: Actress
- Years active: 1992-present
- Children: 2
- Parents: Zbigniew Paleta (father); Bárbara Paciorek Kowalowka (mother)
- Family: Ludwika Paleta (sister)

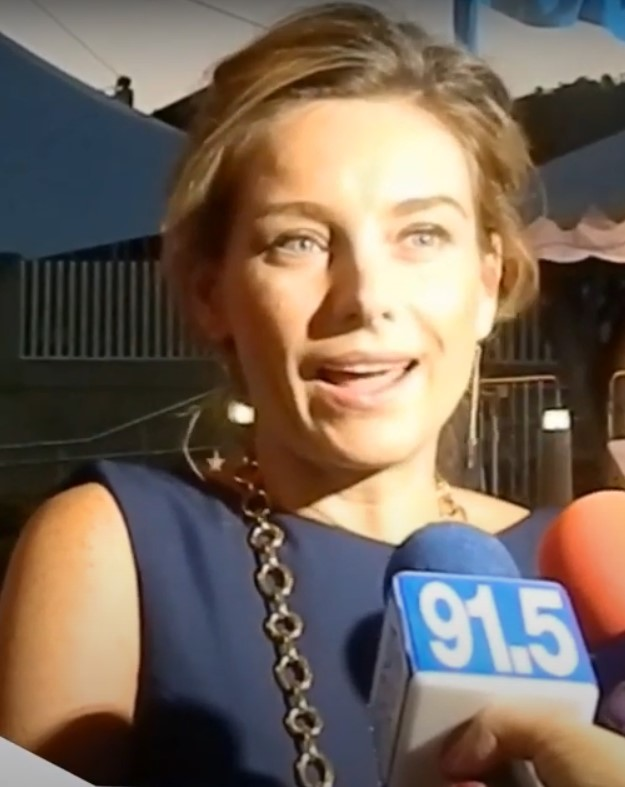
Dominika Paleta in 2015

Dominika Paleta Paciorek (born October 23, 1972) is a Polish-Mexican actress.

== Life and career ==
Paleta's career has included roles in several telenovelas, most notably La usurpadora (1998). Other productions in which the actress has participated include Por un beso (2000), La Intrusa (2001), El Alma Herida (2003), La noche de siempre (2005), Los Plateados (2005), Trece miedos (2007), Mañana es para siempre (2008), Triunfo del Amor (2010) and Por Siempre mi Amor (2013).

== Filmography ==
=== Films ===
Year	Title	Role	Notes
2003	Ladies' Night	Invitada Lila	
2005	La noche de siempre	Claudia	Short film
2005	Yo estaba ocupada encontrando respuestas, mientras tú simplemente seguías con la vida real	Conductora	Short film
2010	Reminiscencia	Elena	Short film
2011	La otra familia	Luisa	
2011	Memoria de mis putas tristes	Ximena Ortiz	
2015	Apasionado Pancho Villa	Juana Torres	
2022	Mirreyes contra Godínez 2: El retiro	Katia San Martín	

=== Television ===
Year	Title	Role	Notes
1997	Amada enemiga	Jessica Quijano Proal	Lead role
1998	La usurpadora	Gema Durán Bracho	Recurring role
1999	Tres mujeres	Raquel Lerdo Muñoz	Recurring role
1999	Alma rebelde	Graciela	Recurring role
1999	Camino a casa	Unknown role	TV mini-series
2000	Mujer, casos de la vida real	Unknown role	"Traición" (Season 17, Episode 20)
2000	Locura de amor	Pamela	Supporting Role
2000	Por un beso	Fernanda Lavalle de Díaz de León	
2001	La intrusa	Anabella Roldán Limantur de Fernández	Main role
2003	El alma herida	Patricia Araiza	Recurring role
2005	Los Plateados	Luciana Castañeda	Main role
2007	Trece miedos	Erica	"Embalsamante" (Season 1, Episode 10)
2008	El juramento	Alma Robles Conde	Main role
2008–09	Mañana es para siempre	Liliana Elizalde Rivera	Main role
2010	Mujeres asesinas	María	"María, fanática" (Season 3, Episode 11)
2010–11	Triunfo del amor	Ximena de Alba	Main role
2013–14	Por siempre mi amor	Sonia Arenas de la Riva	Main role
2015	Antes muerta que Lichita	Sheyla	2 episodes
2016	El hotel de los secretos	Sofía Alarcón	Main role
2022	Rebelde	Marina de Langarica Funtanet	2 episodes
2022	Pena ajena	Silvia	Main role
2023	Horario estelar	Bernarda Díaz	Main role
2023	Más allá de ti	Caroline	Main role
2024	Ahora que no estás	Ágata Merán	3 episodes
2026	Lobo, morir matando	Leonor Castañeda	Main role

== See also ==
- Polish Mexicans
- List of Polish people
