= Karina Mora =

Mexican actress (born 1980)

- Born: Karina Patricia Mora Novelo; November 17, 1980 (age 44); Mérida, Yucatán, Mexico
- Occupation(s): Actress, model
- Children: 1

Karina Mora (born November 17, 1980) is a Mexican actress. She has appeared in various telenovelas and more than fifteen films since 1999.

== Filmography ==
Year	Title	Role	Notes
2002	Las vías del amor	Clara	
2002-2003	Clase 406		
2004	Gitanas	María Magdalena Antich	
2005	Corazón Partido	Alejandra Garza	
2006	Heridas de amor	Lizania Luque Lemans	
2006	Marina	Matilde Vega de Alarcón	
2008	Vivir sin ti	Bárbara	
2009	Pecadora	Genoveva Anderson	
2009–2010	Alma indomable	Dubraska Sorrento	
2010	¿Dónde está Elisa?	Gisela Cruz	
2011-12	Una maid en Manhattan	Yasmín Mendoza	
