= Marina (2006 TV series) =

- Cast photo
- Created by: Inés Rodena
- Developed by: Alberto Gómez; Cristina Policastro; Adriana Barraza
- Starring: Mauricio Ochmann; Manolo Cardona; Sandra Echeverría; Aylin Mujica; Humberto Zurita; Susana Dosamantes
- Theme music composer: Miguel de Narváez
- Opening theme: "Nos Volveremos A Ver" by Sandra Echeverría
- Country of origin: United States
- Original language: Spanish
- No. of episodes: 169

Production
- Executive producers: Mary-Kathryn Kennedy, Rafael Uriostegui
- Producer: Ana Celia Urquidi producer = Daniel CamhiAddee
- Camera setup: Multi-camera
- Running time: 42-45 minutes

Original release
- Network: Telemundo
- Release: October 16, 2006 – June 28, 2007

Related
- Tierra de pasiones; Madre Luna; Los ricos también lloran (1979); María la del barrio (1995)

Marina is an American Spanish-language telenovela that aired for one season on Telemundo. It premièred on October 16, 2006 and concluded on June 28, 2007.

Sandra Echeverría, in her first major role, plays the title character. Aylín Mújica plays twin sisters, Laura and Verónica Saldivar. Mauricio Ochmann appears as Ricardo in early episodes before being replaced by Manolo Cardona.

Telemundo's slogan in English-language ads for the show was "The heat of Acapulco, the passion of a woman." As with most of its other soap operas, the network broadcast English subtitles as closed captions on CC3. Marina was produced by Argos Mexico.

During the show's last month, June 28, 2007, Marina's time slot (which included one soccer pre-emption and an encore of the finale) averaged 577,000 core adult viewers (ages 18 to 49), an 18 percent increase over the year before, when Tierra de Pasiones aired during that hour, according to Nielsen Media Research.

== Story ==
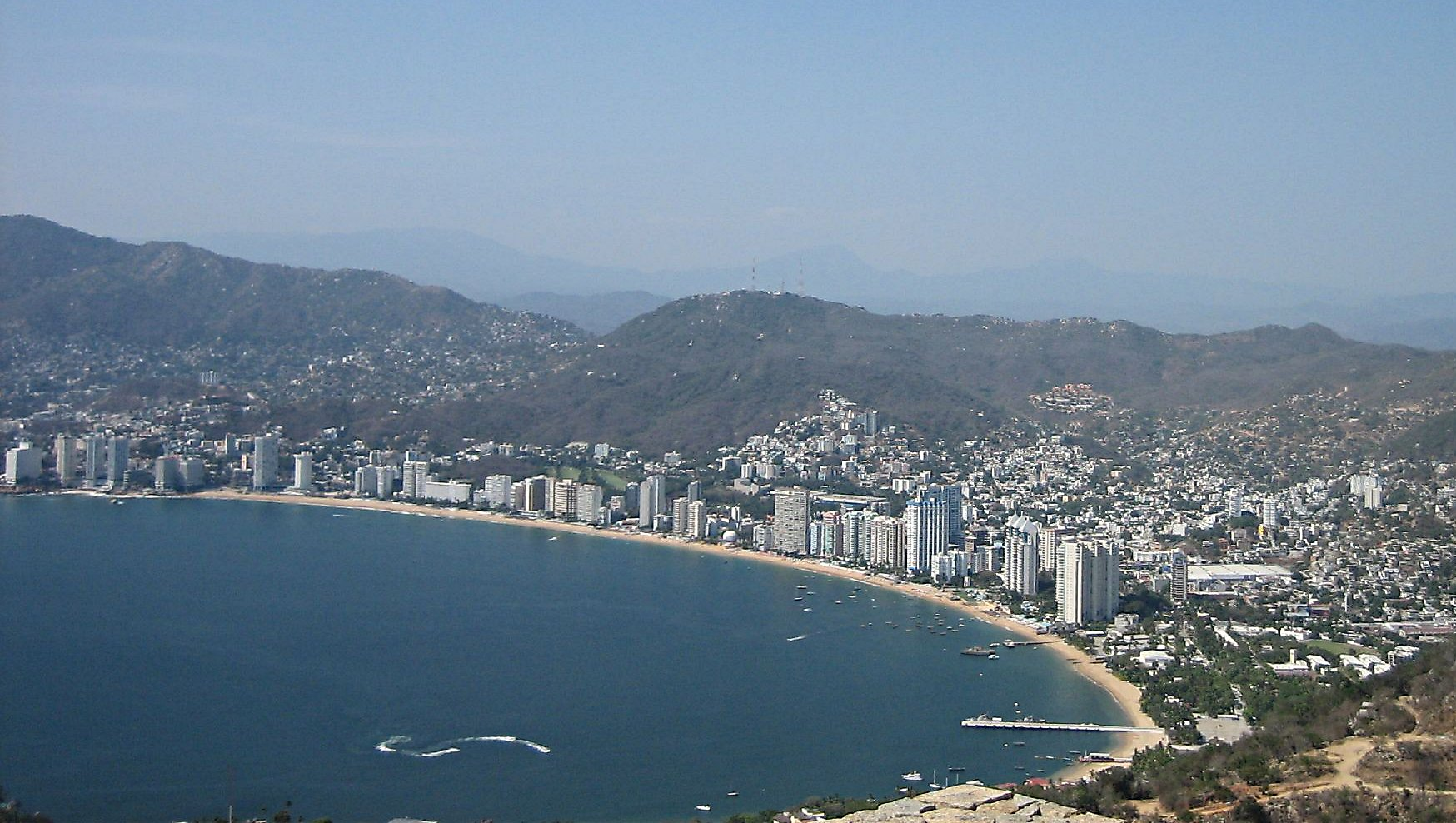
Acapulco, the town where the telenovela is set.

Set in Acapulco, this love story features Marina, a beautiful, sweet young woman who makes a living driving a tourist boat. Her simple life transforms when her mother dies unexpectedly and she inherits a large family fortune. Marina moves into an elegant mansion owned by the wealthy Alarcón Morales family, who treat her with evil, scorn and rejection.

The young woman unexpectedly enters a wealthy social circle characterized by luxury, personal conflicts and rivalries. As she adjusts to her new surroundings, she develops a romantic relationship with Ricardo Alarcón, a man she had not initially considered a potential love interest.

== Plot ==
Mauricio Ochmann and Sandra Echeverria, in Marina

Marina is a young, beautiful girl, neglected by her rich father who loses her mother and her house. Her uncle, who was madly in love with her mother and always took care of Marina from afar, promises her mother on her death bed that he will watch over Marina. When Marina moves to her uncle's mansion, she meets her future husband Ricardo, who currently is unhappily married to Adriana. Adriana is having an affair with many men, including Ricardo's best friend, Julio. She hates Marina because she notices that her husband is falling in love with her. Julio and Adriana plot to kill Marina, but all attempts fail; instead Julio is thought to be dead after he is caught kidnapping Marina and then throws himself off a cliff. Adriana is then asked to leave the mansion by Marina's uncle. Instead she tries to kill Ricardo, but when that fails, she runs out of the house and is killed in a horrible car accident. Before she dies, she confesses to Ricardo about all of the affairs she had and admits that the baby she was expecting was Julio's and not his. This news leaves Ricardo very insecure.

Later Ricardo and Marina marry. Two months later, Marina and Ricardo return from their honeymoon. Ricardo then leaves her because he thinks she is unfaithful, which in reality is a scheme his mother devised. She becomes pregnant during their honeymoon but when she leaves her house to attend her baby shower, Julio returns and scares her. She is taken by a woman to a charity hospital and gives birth. She is in a state of shock and when she is released from the hospital she feels lost and confused. Her baby is taken by Julio, who is wearing a mask, to a dumpster where a woman finds the baby and takes him home. Ricardo soon finds out the pictures were fake and takes Marina back, despite her instability. Ricardo tries to give Marina an adopted baby girl; at first she refuses, thinking of her son, but at last accepts her to make her husband happy. As the time passes Marina still thinks about her son, but everyone believes her son died.

Ricardo, is starting to get tired of Marina's depression and he is starting to seek affection in Sara. Sara is the maid at Marina's uncle's mansion. Sara and Ricardo then have an affair. Ricardo's daughter then spots them kissing and tells Marina. Then Ricardo's mother sees them, and then Marina does as well. Ricardo and Marina solve their problems and stay together. Years later, Sara and Julio fall in love themselves. They get Marina and Ricardo's long lost child to rob the mansion but then Marina's intuition tells her that the boy is her son. She rushes to her son's "mom" and finds out that the boy is indeed her son. Ricardo's mother thinks that Marina is cheating on Ricardo with their son and it leads to a divorce between Ricardo and Marina. After a lot of difficulty, Ricardo finally believes that Chuy is his son. However Marina does not return to him. After many unfortunate events, Marina ends up in jail. Patty gets sick and is rushed off to Houston by her biological mother and eventually she gets better. Her biological mother refuses to let her return to Acapulco as she is afraid she will lose Patty, but finally she returns to Acapulco.

== Cast ==
=== Main cast ===
Actor(s)	Character(s)	Descriptions
Mauricio Ochmann	Ricardo Alarcon Morales	son of Alberta, Elias' adoptive brother, Adriana's husband, in love with Marina
Manolo Cardona	Ricardo Alarcon Morales	in love with Marina, Marina's husband, biological father of Chuy, adoptive father of Paty, lover of Veronica
Sandra Echeverria	Marina Hernandez de Alarcon	in love with Ricardo, Ricardo's wife, Chuy's biological mother, Paty's adoptive mother, Elias' half-sister, ex-wife of Federico
Aylin Mujica	Laura Saldivar Castaño	Veronica's twin, in love with Ricardo, Marina's best friend, Daniel's wife, killed by Veronica
Aylin Mujica	Veronica Saldivar Castaño	Laura's twin, in love with Ricardo, hates Marina, Main Villain, kills her uncle Joaquin, twin sister Laura, Damian and tries to kill Lucia, accidentally buried alive
Humberto Zurita	Guillermo Alarcon Herrera	uncle of Marina, Ricardo and Elias, was Rosalba's husband
Susana Dosamantes	Alberta Morales de Alarcon	Ricardo's and Elias's mother, villain, later become good after she found out Chuy was her grandson
Marta Aura	Guadalupe "Lupe" Tovar	foster mother of Chuy

=== Antagonists ===
Actor	Character(s)	Descriptions
Carlos Caballero	Julio Montiel Palafox	Criminal, Villain who is thought dead but isn't, was Patty's husband, shot by police
Elizabeth Cervantes	Sara López	maid at Alarcon mansion, in love with Ricardo then with Julio, villain, later good
Eduardo Victoria	Federico Santibáñez	in love with Marina, Patty's biological father, gave his surname to Chuy, tried to kill Ricardo, ends up in jail. Villain, later becomes good

=== Teen talents ===
Actor	Character(s)	Descriptions
Ilean Almaguer	Patricia (Paty) Alarcon / Santibáñez	adopted daughter of Marina and Ricardo, in love with Chuy, daughter of Federico and Rosalba, (former) girlfriend of Bruno
Alfonso Dosal	Ricardito (Chuy) Santibáñez / Alarcon	son of Marina and Ricardo, in love with Paty

=== Secondary cast ===
- Jorge Luis Vasquez .... Elias Alarcόn - half brother of Marina, brother of Ricardo (adoptive relationship) Matilde's husband, Bruno's father
- Karina Mora .... Matilde Vega de Alarcón - Elias's wife, Bruno's mother', Marinas' best friend
- Angélica Celaya .... Rosalba Alvarez - mother of Patty, villain, later good
- Beatriz Cecilia .... Pastora - housekeeper at Alarcón-Morales mansion.
- Mara Cuevas .... Lucía Saldívar - half-sister of Laura and Veronica, Veronica tried to kill her
- Guadalupe Martinez .... Balbina
- Veronica Teran .... Blanca
- Claudia Lobo .... Chela
- Georgina Tabora ... Clorinda - hates Chuy and Lupe, makes rumors about Chuy, married to a luchador who later dies, villain
- Carlos Corona .... El Latas
- Juan Alejandro Ávila .... Inspector León Felipe

=== Special participations ===
- Dolores Heredia....Rosa - Marina's mother who has died in love with Guillermo's brother
- Gustavo Navarro .... Daniel - Married to Laura, who is thought dead woman beater
- Sandra Destenave.... Adriana - First wife of Ricardo, villain, lover of Ricardo's best friend Julio, pregnant with Julio, daughter of Lazara, gets into car accident dies in the hospital
- Pablo Azar .... Macario "Papalote" - friend of Marina and in love with Marina and proposes to her
- Martin Navarrete.... Dr. Valverde - Alarcon's family doctor
- Lourdes Villareal .... Lazara - villain, Adriana's mother
- Emilio Guerrero .... Teacher
- Gloria Margarita Stalina... Mayra Jiménez Álvarez
- Fabian Peña
- Mario Loría...Abogado Gaitan
- María del Carmen Félix.... Elizabeth

=== Kids ===
- Dessana Zendejas ... 8 years old Paty
- Adriano Zendejas ... 8 years old Chuy

== Adaptations ==
Head writer Alberto Gómez adapted this serial from RCTV's Raquel (1970) and Abigail (1988), blended the second part with the first part of Los Ricos También Lloran. Raquel was adapted since by Carlos Romero and Manuel Muñoz Rico in separate parts; and Alberto Gómez was the adapter for this series throughout its run.
