= Intriga =

Mexican telenovela

- Genre: Telenovela
- Country of origin: Mexico
- Original language: Spanish

Original release
- Network: Telesistema Mexicano
- Release: 1968

Intriga, is a Mexican telenovela produced by Televisa and originally transmitted by Telesistema Mexicano.

== Cast ==
- Ofelia Montesco
- Raúl Ramírez
- Anita Blanch
- Susana Alexander
- Jorge Ortiz de Pinedo
