= Un baúl lleno de miedo =

- Directed by: Joaquín Bissner
- Written by: Danilo Cuéllar
- Story by: Danilo Cuéllar
- Produced by: Roberto Gómez Bolaños
- Starring: Diana Bracho; Julián Pastor; Carlos Espejel; Patricia Llaca; Maya Mishalska
- Cinematography: Ángel Goded
- Edited by: Óscar Figueroa
- Music by: José Antonio Farías
- Production company: Televicine
- Release date: 1997 (Mexico)
- Running time: 85 minutes
- Country: Mexico
- Language: Spanish

Un baúl lleno de miedo ("A Trunk Full of Fear" in English) is a Mexican comedy film directed by Joaquín Bissner, written by Danilo Cuéllar and produced by Roberto Gómez Bolaños. Released in 1997, it stars Diana Bracho and Julián Pastor.

== Plot ==
Esteban Estévez, a mystery novel writer, must finish his new work, so in search of inspiration, he moves to an isolated cabin in the woods with his wife, Cristina, and his assistant, Federico. Secretly, Federico had been renting the cabin to a mysterious woman whom he urges to leave the house before Esteban and Cristina arrive. While leaving, the woman decides to keep an uncomfortable thing inside the house: a trunk containing a corpse.

== Cast ==
- Diana Bracho as Cristina de Estévez
- Julián Pastor as Esteban Estévez
- Carlos Espejel as Federico
- Patricia Llaca as Laura Toledo
- Maya Mishalska as Emilia
- Miguel Ángel Fuentes as the Black Vampire
- Arturo Amor as Dead Man

== Production ==
Diana Bracho made the film two years after having made Between Pancho Villa and a Naked Woman.

In his autobiography Sin querer queriendo, Roberto Gómez Bolaños affirmed that the film suffered from a "very poor promotion", and as a result "it did not achieve the expected success", with Gómez Bolaños stating that the same had happened with the previous film he produced, ¡Que vivan los muertos!.
