= The Second Bakery Attack =

Short story by Haruki Murakami

- Short story by Haruki Murakami
- pages 130–131 of the January 1992 issue of Playboy; illustration by Kinuko Y. Craft
- Original title: パン屋再襲撃 (Pan'ya Saishūgeki)
- Translator: Jay Rubin
- Country: Japan
- Language: Japanese

Publication
- Published in: Marie Claire Japan
- Publication type: Periodical
- Media type: Print (Magazine)
- Publication date: August 1985
- Published in English: January 1992 (Playboy)

"The Second Bakery Attack" (Japanese: パン屋再襲撃, Hepburn: Pan'ya Saishūgeki) is a short story by Haruki Murakami, originally published in the August 1985 issue of Marie Claire Japan. It is a sequel to Murakami's short story "Bakery Attack", which was published in 1981. In 1986, "The Second Bakery Attack" was included in a short story collection of the same name. The story was later translated into English by Jay Rubin and published in the January 1992 issue of Playboy. In 1993, Rubin's translation was included in the collection The Elephant Vanishes.

== Plot ==
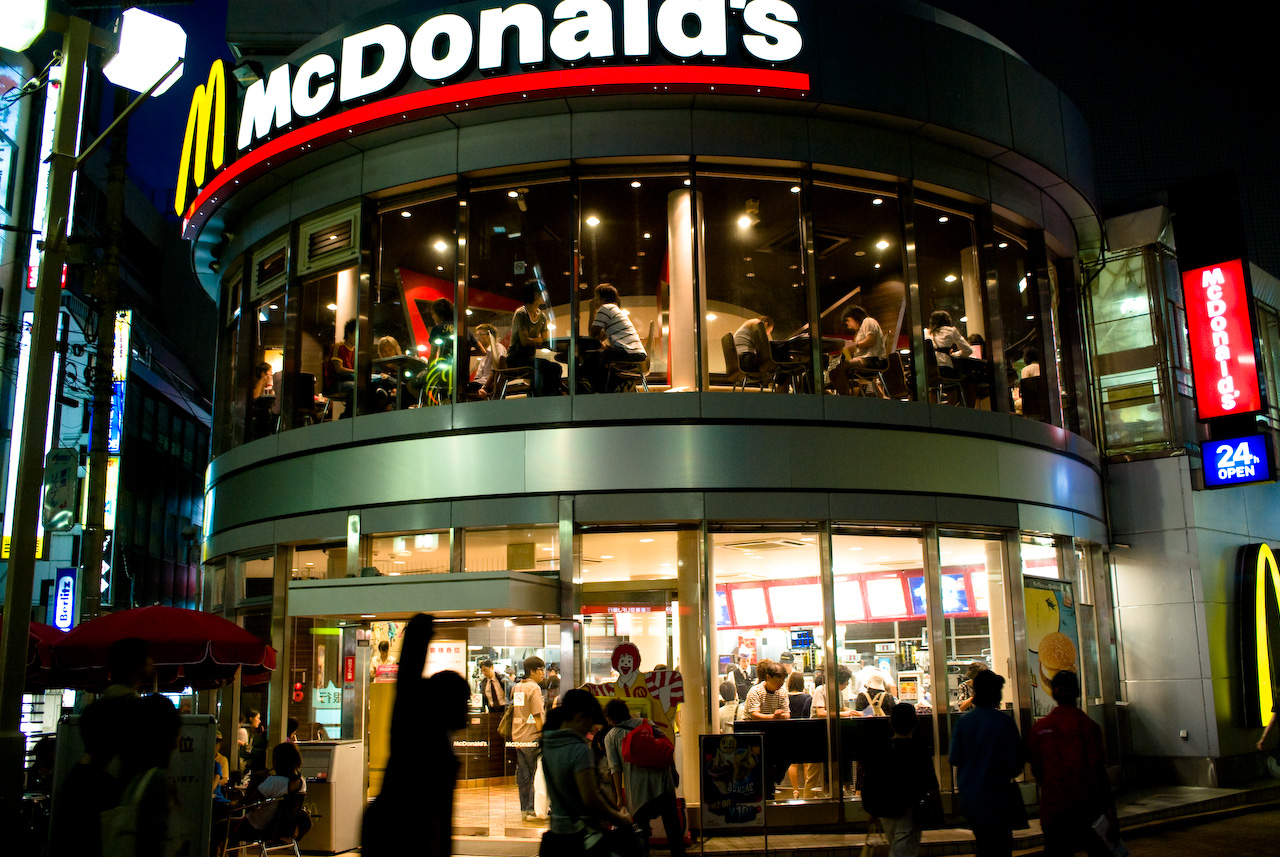
In the story, a couple rob a McDonald's in Tokyo at night.

A recently married couple in their late twenties lie in bed, famished; they have little in their refrigerator: a six-pack of beer and some cookies. After drinking and eating all of it, the man recounts to his wife a time he and his friend "robbed" a bakery ten years ago. The two intended to take all the bread they could from a bakery by force. The man who ran the bakery offers a counterproposal before the two men can act: since he is a Richard Wagner fanatic, if they listen to Tannhäuser and The Flying Dutchman with him in the bakery, he will give them all the bread they can carry. They agree, and the bread is enough to feed the two men for a few days. After hearing of that story, the woman suggests that they do the same thing, despite it being 2:30 A.M.

They drive around Tokyo looking for a bakery but all of them are closed; they "compromise" to "rob" a McDonald's instead. With ski-masks and a Remington automatic shotgun, they enter the restaurant and demand thirty Big Macs. The three employees working there fulfill the peculiar request. The couple then leave the restaurant and drive until they find an empty parking lot; they then eat four to six Big Macs each until they are full. The man feels calm after this experience.

== Publication ==
"The Second Bakery Attack" was originally published in the August 1985 issue of Marie Claire Japan. As its title suggests, "The Second Bakery Attack" is a sequel to Murakami's short story "Bakery Attack", which was published in the October 1981 issue of Waseda Bungaku, the literary magazine of Murakami's alma mater Waseda University. "The Second Bakery Attack" would later be included in a short story collection of the same name released by Bungeishunjū in April 1986.

In 1991, the story was translated into English by Jay Rubin and published in the January 1992 issue of Playboy. Its cover page illustration was illustrated by Japanese artist Kinuko Y. Craft. It was the first time Murakami's work was translated by Rubin, who would later go on to translate many of Murakami's novels and stories. Rubin's English translation would later be included in Murakami's 1993 short story collection The Elephant Vanishes.

== Adaptations ==
In 1998, the German film The Polar Bear (German: Der Eisbär), written and directed by Granz Henman and Til Schweiger, used elements of "The Second Bakery Attack" in three intersecting story lines. "The Second Bakery Attack" also became a basis for a segment of the South Korean omnibus film Acoustic (2010).

A 1998 short film adaptation was directed by Wolf Baschung and featured author/actress Galaxy Craze.

=== 2010 short film ===
Release poster

"The Second Bakery Attack" was adapted as The Second Bakery Attack, a 2010 Mexican-American short film directed by Carlos Cuarón, starring Kirsten Dunst and Brian Geraghty. Dunst plays the wife, Nat, and Geraghty plays the husband, Dan. The film was shot in Brooklyn, New York, and Totowa, New Jersey. The short film premiered on 17 October 2010 at the Morelia International Film Festival (FICM) in Morelia, Mexico. In 2009, Cuarón received the Premio Cuervo Tradicional award from the FICM and was awarded 100,000 pesos to go toward his next film project, The Second Bakery Attack. The film had its Asian premiere on 20 October 2010 at the 23rd Tokyo International Film Festival (TIFF) in Tokyo, Japan. The short film was also screened at the 20th Short Shorts Film Festival & Asia (SSFF & ASIA) in October 2018 at the Tokyo Photographic Art Museum.

Cast

- Kirsten Dunst as Nat
- Brian Geraghty as Dan
- Lucas Akoskin as Demitrio
- Sherry Gordon as Cherry
