= Verónica Langer =

Mexican actress (born 1953)

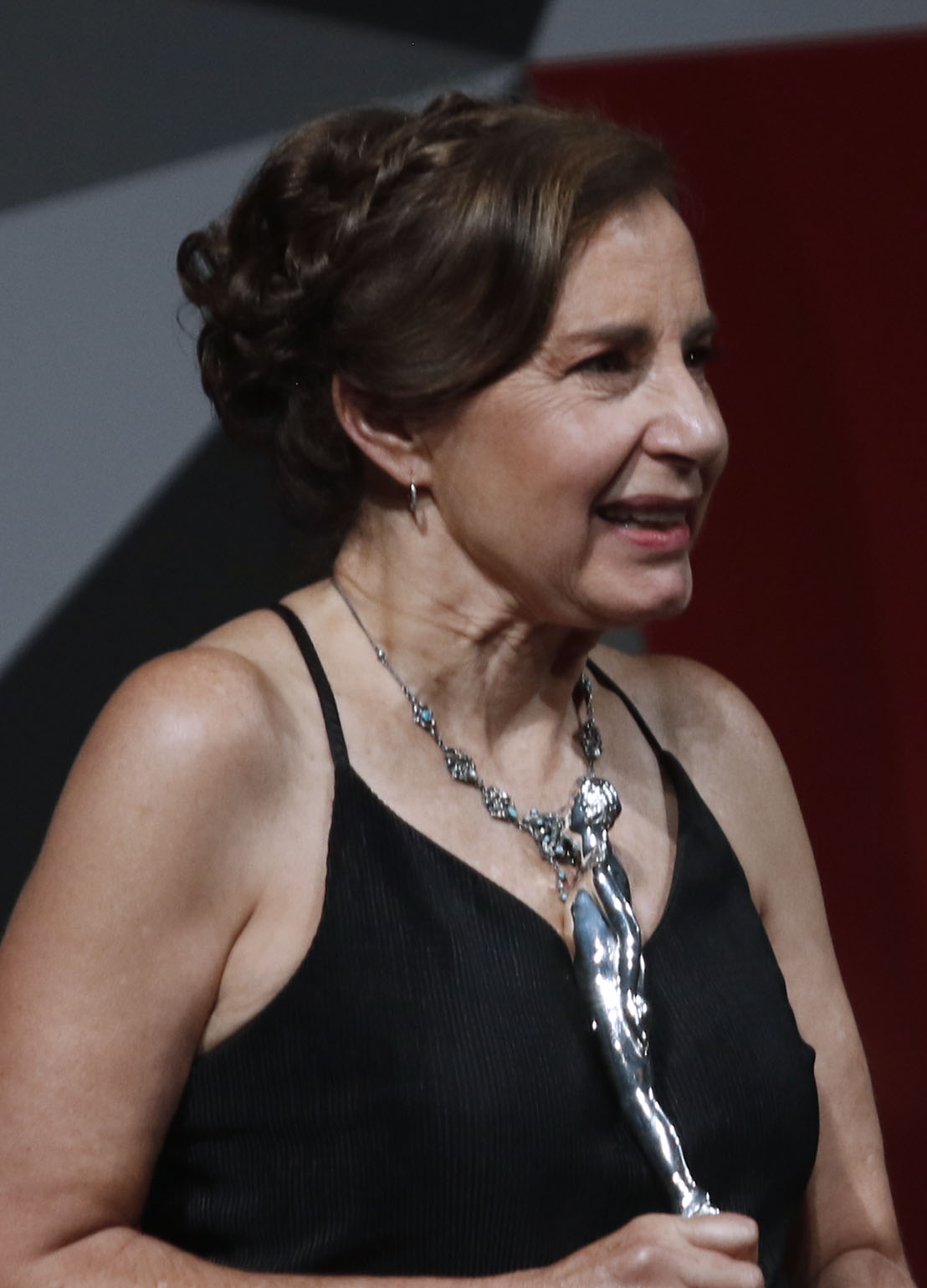
- Langer receiving the Ariel in 2017
- Born: June 11, 1953 (age 72); Buenos Aires, Argentina
- Occupation: actress
- Years active: 1981–present
- Children: Pablo Aura Langer and José Julián González Langer

Verónica Langer (born 11 June 1953) is an Argentine-born Mexican actress.

== Career ==
Langer has two Ariel Awards. In her long career, she has starred in films including Y tu mamá también, El crimen del Padre Amaro and Hasta el viento tiene miedo. From 2018 to 2020 she played Carmelita in The House of Flowers. In 2019, she played the lead role of Vero in Clases de historia. Her character is a woman in her sixties facing a cancer diagnosis, who decides to turn around her boring life.

She has been described as "a chameleon of TV, film, and theatre".

== Filmography ==
=== Film ===
- We Will Never Belong (2022) .... Eleonora
- My Girlfriend Is the Revolution (2021)
- Hilda (2014) .... Susana Esmeralda Martínez
- Nos vemos papá (2011) .... Tía Úrsula
- Daniel y Ana (2009) .... Psicóloga
- Soy mi madre (2008) .... Clara
- Hasta el viento tiene miedo (2007) .... Dra. Bernarda
- El viaje de la nonna (2007) .... María
- Niñas mal (2007) .... Mamá de Heidi
- El búfalo de la noche (2007) .... Mamá de Gregorio
- Efectos secundarios (2006) .... Miss Lola
- Mar adentro (2004)
- En cualquier lugar (2004)
- El crimen del padre Amaro (2002) .... Amparito
- Y tu mamá también (2001) .... María Eugenia Calles de Huerta
- Todo el poder (2000) .... Frida
- Extravío (2000) .... Eva
- Llamadas obscenas (1996)
- El amarrador 3 (1995) .... Beatriz
- La orilla de la tierra (1994)
- Novia que te vea (1994) .... Raquel Groman
- Una maestra con Ángel (1994)
- Tiempo cautivo (1994)
- Miroslava (1993) .... Miroslava Becková de Stern
- La furia de un gallero (1992)
- Las buenas costumbres (1990) .... Martha
- Macho y hembras (1987)
- Amanecer (1984)

=== Television ===
- Mujer de nadie (2022) .... Martha
- Imperio de mentiras (2020-2021) .... Piedad
- Rosario Tijeras (2018-2019) .... Aurora
- La casa de las flores (2018-2020) .... Carmelita
- La candidata (2016-2017) .... Magdalena "Magda" Gómez
- Hasta que te conocí (2016) .... Micaela
- Amor sin reserva (2014-2015) .... Karina de Cisneros
- Hombre tenías que ser (2013) .... Abril Ortega
- La otra cara del alma (2012-2013) .... Felicitas Durán
- Prófugas del destino (2010-2011) .... Rebeca Fernández de Acuña
- Soy tu fan (2010) .... Marta
- Pobre rico... pobre (2008-2009) .... La Jefa
- Cambio de vida (2008)
- Amor en custodia (2005-2006) .... Alicia
- Mirada de mujer: El regreso (2003-2004) .... Rosario
- Lo que es el amor (2001-2002) .... Jacqueline "Jackie" Lomelí
- Lo que callamos las mujeres (2001) (Episodio "El resto de mi vida") .... Angélica
- Tío Alberto (2000-2001) .... Maruja Sotomayor
- Tres veces Sofía (1998-1999) .... Elsa Cifuentes
- Mirada de mujer (1997-1998) .... Rosario
- Marisol (1996) .... Carmen Pedroza López
- La sombra del otro (1996) .... Fátima
- Retrato de familia (1995-1996) .... Mercedes de la Canal
- Mujer, casos de la vida real (1995-1996)
- Las secretas intenciones (1992) .... Paty
- Destinos (1992) .... Pati
- La hora marcada (1990) (Episodio "El revólver") .... Locutora / Mamá
- Morir para vivir (1989) .... Martha
- Infamia (1981)

== Awards ==
=== Premios Ariel ===
Año	Categoría	Película	Resultado
2017	Mejor actriz	La caridad	Won
2016	Mejor actriz	Hilda	Nominated
2010	Mejor coactuación femenina	Cinco días sin Nora	Nominated
1994	Mejor coactuación femenina	Novia que te vea	Nominated
1993	Mejor actriz de cuadro	Miroslava	Won
