= Brigitte Alexander =

German author, actress, director and translator

Brígida Alexander Rosenstein
- Born: Brigitte Kaufmann; 9 October 1911; Stuttgart, Kingdom of Württemberg, German Empire
- Died: 10 May 1995 (aged 83); Mexico City, Mexico
- Other names: Brigitte Châtel, Brígida Alexander
- Occupations: actress, translator, author
- Years active: 1933-1994
- Children: Susana Alexander

Brigitte Alexander (9 October 1911 - 10 May 1995) was a German-born Mexican author, actress, director and translator. When the Nazi party seized power in Germany, she fled to France. Facing arrest in France, her husband chose to enter the Foreign Legion. Assisted by friends and Albert Einstein, the family made their way to Mexico. Alexander, who spoke five languages, worked as a translator for UNESCO and Amnesty International, and performed in movies and plays in Mexico.

== Biography ==
Brigitte Kaufmann was born on 9 October 1911 in Stuttgart, Germany into a Jewish family. Her father was in the military and during her childhood they moved to Berlin, where she completed high school. Her studies focused on the classics and she wrote her thesis on Friedrich Hölderlin. She learned German, Spanish, French, Greek, Latin and English and later, due to her extensive knowledge of language, was employed as a translator for UNESCO and Amnesty International.

She began university in Berlin in 1932, but then transferred to the University of Frankfurt. During a trip to Austria with her Aryan boyfriend, news broke that Hitler had won power and he left her to return to Germany. She fled to Paris in early 1933. In France, Kaufmann worked as an actress, under the name of Brigitte Châtel and translated documents. She met her future husband, Alfred Alexander-Katz in Paris, and they married in 1939; the following day, her husband was taken to a concentration camp. He was given the choice of being interned in a labor camp or joining the Foreign Legion and chose the latter. Their oldest child, Didier, was born in France, Alexander was sent to Clermont-Ferrand and the family relocated. In 1942, a telegram advised the young family that Albert Einstein and Rudolph Uhlman, a lawyer in New York, had secured visas through Ambassador Gilberto Bosques for them to escape to Veracruz, Mexico aboard the ship San Thomé.

Once they had arrived in Mexico City, Alexander began acting. Her career came about by accident; having gone to see a performance by Anita and Isabelita Blanch she commented on the performance in French. The man setting next to her asked if she was French and if she could act. She replied in the affirmative and secured her first job from him, playwright Rodolfo Usigli. Later she became a regular performer at poetry recitals at the Heinrich Heine club and cabaret theatre. Soon her twins, Susana and Roberto were born and Alexander became a widow, doing whatever she needed to do to make ends meet: breeding pigs, selling silk, selling hearing aids, and acting.

She wrote the monologue "The Return", and, in 1951, produced the first Mexican telenovela, adapted from a drama by Cuban writer Félix B. Caignet, Angeles de la Calle which ran from March 1952 to July 1955 and was sponsored by the Lotería Nacional. She became the first woman in Mexico to produce and direct television programs and she was then asked to help structure the programming for Channel 11.

Alexander died on 10 May 1995 in Mexico City.

== Selected works ==
=== Publishing ===
Monograph:

- El retorno, in: Stefano, Giovanni di/Peters, Michaela (Hrsg.): México com punto de fuga real o imaginario. Munich: Meidenbauer, 301-304. ISBN 978-3-89975-257-1

Theater plays:

- “La Opera de los tres centavos”
- “Fiesta teatral” (1946)
- “El Proceso” (1953)
- “El Médico a la fuerza” (1954)
- “Cómo ser una buena madre judía” (1979)

=== Filmography ===
Film:

- Redondo (1986)
- Macho y hembras (1987)
- Fragmentos de un cuerpo (1988)
- Barroco (1989)
- Contigo en la distancia (1991) Mamá de Jose
- Como agua para chocolate (1991) Tía Mary
- Miroslava (1993) Abuela de Miroslava
- Ámbar (1994) Madre Kluzki ... aka Amber
- Perfume, efecto inmediato (1994)

Television:

- La Hora Marcada (1990)
- Cultura en movimiento (1993) (documentary)

Television writing/producing:

- Los Cuentos de Pepito (1951) TV series
- Ángeles de la calle (1952) TV series
