= Mafer Suárez =

Mexican director and screenwriter

María Fernanda Suárez de Garay, known professionally as Mafer Suárez, is a Mexican director, screenwriter, and producer. She is best known for her work on the Mexican television series Mujeres asesinas. She has received a lifetime achievement award from The Association of Women in Cinema and Television, and a Silver Cross for career from the GIFF.

== Early life ==
Suárez is from Tampico, Tamaulipas. In 2019, she helped organize the first Independent Film Festival of Tamaulipas, held in Tampico. Her younger sister is actress Cecilia Suárez. She has spoken against the concept of nepotism and said that she only works with Cecilia when the production demands it; Cecilia has expressed the same.

== Filmography ==
=== Film ===
Year	Work	Notes
1995	El abuelo Cheno y otras historias	Producer
1997	Nic Habana	Short, as María Fernanda Suárez
1999	Del olvido al no me acuerdo / Juan, I forgot I don't remember	Producer; as María Fernanda Suárez
2000	Seré la de tus sueños / The One of Your Dreams I'll Be	Video short
2004	Lo de menos	Short
2006	Sexo, amor y otras perversiones	as María Fernanda Suárez; segment in anthology film
2015	A Selfie	Short

=== Television ===
Year	Work	Director	Writer	Channel	Notes
1999	Cuentos para solitarios	Yes	Yes	MVS TV/Universal Pictures	
2010	Gritos de muerte y libertad	Yes	Yes	Televisa	
2008-2010	Mujeres asesinas / Revolution	Yes	Yes	Televisa/Cablevisión	Given a theatre adaptation in 2019, which Suárez also directed
2011	El encanto del águila	Yes		Televisa/Canal 2	
2018	Niñas Promedio	Yes		Canal 11	Miniseries
2019	Playing with Fire	Yes		Telemundo/Netflix	
2022	María Félix: La Doña	Yes		TelevisaUnivision	
2026	Una familia complicada	Yes		TelevisaUnivision	
