= We Will Never Belong =

Nunca seremos parte
- Film poster
- Directed by: Amelia Eloisa
- Written by: Amelia Eloisa
- Produced by: Diego Caballero; Amelia Eloisa; Ana Karen Guzmán; Fernando Javier Guzmán
- Starring: Adriana Palafox; Magnolia Corona; Verónica Langer; Andrea Portal; Cynthia Bordes; Karina Hurtado; Xésar Tena
- Cinematography: Diego Caballero de Alba
- Edited by: Diego Caballero; Carlos Espinoza
- Music by: Phi
- Production companies: Bengar Films; HopperCat Films; Pez Nocturno
- Release date: June 15, 2022 (Guadalajara)
- Running time: 93 minutes
- Country: Mexico
- Language: Spanish

We Will Never Belong (Spanish: Nunca seremos parte) is a 2022 Mexican coming-of-age drama film written and directed by Amelia Eloisa in her directorial debut. Starring Adriana Palafox, Magnolia Corona, Verónica Langer, Andrea Portal, Cynthia Bordes, Karina Hurtado and Xésar Tena.

== Synopsis ==
Her mother's new relationship with a woman has filled Emi, a lonely teenager, with many doubts and resentments. Determined to find a change, she returns to her hometown to live with her father's new family and find solace with her grandmother. There she meets Gala, the daughter of his father's girlfriend, whose originality immediately seduces her and questions her sexuality. Without realizing it, this fleeting relationship will give her the necessary empathy to heal her relationship with her mother and the strength to continue on her way.

== Cast ==
The actors participating in this film are:

- Adriana Palafox as Emi
- Magnolia Corona as Gala
- Verónica Langer as Eleonora
- Andrea Portal as Sandra
- Alex Pimienta as Chila
- Cynthia Bordes
- Karina Hurtado
- Xésar Tena as Cayetano

== Production ==
Principal photography began in April 2020 and was scheduled to last 23 days, but filming was interrupted by the COVID-19 pandemic, one scene was missing to have all the footage completed to start the post-production phase. It was filmed in Nayarit, Sayulita and Punta Mita, everything else was in Jalisco, Mexico.

== Release ==
We Will Never Belong had its international premiere in May 2022 at the Inside Out Toronto 2SLGBTQ+ Film Festival. Then, it had its national premiere on June 15, 2022, as part of the 37th Guadalajara International Film Festival. It premiered on January 28, 2023, as part of the Iberoamerican Film Festival Miami.

== Awards ==
Year	Award / Festival	Category	Recipient	Result	Ref.
2022	Inside Out Film and Video Festival	Audience Award - Best Narrative Feature	We Will Never Belong	Won	
2022	Great Mexican Film Party	Best Actress	Adriana Palafox	Won	
2022	Guadalajara Film Festival 2022 - FICG 37	Maguey Award - Best Narrative Feature	We Will Never Belong	Nominated	
2022	Warsaw International Film Festival	Best Film	We Will Never Belong	Nominated	
2023	Diosas de Plata	Best Newcomer - Female	Adriana Palafox	Nominated	
2023	Diosas de Plata	Best First Work	Amelia Eloisa	Nominated	
