= Premio Cuervo Tradicional =

The Premio Cuervo Tradicional (English: Cuervo Traditional Award) is a lifetime achievement or career recognition award presented at the Morelia International Film Festival by its sponsors, José Cuervo, to recognize a Mexican cinema personality.

== Prize ==
The prize includes a statuette called El Ojo, by Javier Marín, and a monetary award of 120,000 or 130,000 pesos to be put towards a future project; this is said to affirm support for Mexican filmmaking excellence and allow those in cinema to continue creating. In 2009, recipient Carlos Cuarón put the funds towards creating the short film The Second Bakery Attack.

== History and recipients ==
First awarded in 2005, the Premio Cuervo Tradicional has been given to one individual each year since. Its first female recipient was Cecilia Suárez in 2018. Accepting it, Suárez said that she hoped more actresses and female filmmakers would be recognized in the future of the award. Six of the fifteen recipients are actors, the rest directors.

Recipients are:

Year	Recipient
2005	Carlos Carrera
2006	Juan Carlos Rulfo
2007	Carlos Reygadas
2008	Fernando Eimbcke
2009	Carlos Cuarón
2010	Diego Luna
2011	Gael García Bernal
2012	Michel Franco
2013	Amat Escalante
2014	Jonás Cuarón
2015	Gabriel Ripstein
2016	Demián Bichir
2017	Daniel Giménez Cacho
2018	Cecilia Suárez
2019	Marina de Tavira
