= The Blue Room (2002 film) =

2002 Mexican film by Walter Doehner

- Spanish-language DVD cover
- Directed by: Walter Doehner
- Written by: Walter Doehner; Vicente Leñero (Screenplay); Georges Simenon (Novel)
- Produced by: Epigmenio Ibarra; Carlos Payán; Inna Payán; Christian Valdelièvre (co-producer)
- Starring: Patricia Llaca; Juan Manuel Bernal; Elena Anaya; José María Yazpik; Mario Iván Martínez; Margarita Sanz; Damián Alcázar
- Release date: 2002
- Running time: 95 minutes
- Language: Spanish

The Blue Room (Spanish: La habitación azul) is a 2002 Mexican-Spanish film produced by Argos Cine and directed by Walter Doehner. It is the second adaptation of the 1964 novel La Chambre bleue by Georges Simenon.

== Plot ==
Toño (Juan Manuel Bernal) is being held for questioning by police agent Garduño (Damián Alcázar), a murder has been committed and Garduño is determined to get to the bottom of this; Toño starts then telling his story: A few weeks before, he and his wife, Ana (Elena Anaya) and their daughter, decided to come back to settle down in Toño's hometown, after living for a long time in Mexico City. But things get complicated when Toño re-encounters Andrea (Patricia Llaca), a woman for whom he had lusted since adolescence and who's now married to Nicolás (Mario Iván Martínez), Toño's best friend from high school.

Soon, the unfulfilled and repressed desires of both Toño and Andrea are passionately released with their sexual encounter. Hiding from Toño's wife and Andrea's husband, they are helped by Toño's brother (José María Yazpik), who runs a hotel in the town, and whose blue room is lent to the lovers (hence the name of the film, "The Blue Room"). Despite these precautions, many people in the town figure out the affair between Toño and Andrea, Toño then starts considering ending his affair.

Meanwhile, Nicolás' health is rapidly declining until one night he dies, and many people, including Nicolás' mother Dora (Margarita Sanz), are convinced that Andrea caused his death in order for her to be free to be with Toño. Garduño shows Toño a letter from Andrea to him with the message "Now it's your turn" to further incriminate them, Toño denies any culpability and continues his story.

Eventually, Ana realizes her husband's affair and they have a fight, causing Toño to storm out of his house, when he returns he finds the police in his house who tell him that Ana has died from poisoning, the police agents then take him into custody.

Garduño then reveals to Toño that he learned that Nicolás with his death left a sizable inheritance to Andrea, he then accuses both her and Toño of conspiring to murder both Ana and Nicolás to keep the inheritance for themselves, and reveals that the final piece of the puzzle came to him via an anonymous written tip; However, both Toño and Andrea deny any knowledge on the inheritance, Garduño then becomes doubtful of his own conclusion.

Despite that the evidence is enough to convict them, on a hunch, Garduño decides to pay a last visit to Dora, by sneaking into the kitchen of her bakery-shop, he finds that Dora was the source of the anonymous tip, as well as finding boxes of the same rat poison used to kill Ana, Garduño then confronts Dora with this who tearfully confesses having poisoned Toño's wife in order to frame both him and Andrea of murder, since several years back her husband never forgave her of cheating on him, and as a result she never owned any of her shop, with her only son, Nicolás', death it would only be a matter of time for Andrea to seize the entire shop and leave her with nothing.

Garduño then clears Toño and Andrea, and releases them, that night after lovemaking in the same blue room, Andrea confesses to Toño that the night Nicolás died she purposely closed his oxygen valve, not just to end his suffering, but for both of them, shocking Toño.

== Controversy ==
The film was quite controversial due to its erotic advertising, most advertising materials showed Patricia Llaca fully nude lying on a bed and looking at the camera. Billboards and ads on public transport and in magazines, etc., showed the same or a similar picture, raising controversy thanks to Llaca's nudity. In some media, her buttocks were then digitally covered with a blanket to calm the sensitivities of offended Mexicans.

The film itself was indeed highly erotic, showing full nude scenes of both Patricia Llaca and Juan Manuel Bernal. In this sense, the advertising was true to the film. Llaca, however, declared that the film producers deliberately "used" her nude body to advertise the film.

== Awards ==
In 2002, the film received the Silver Precolumbian Circle at the Bogota Film Festival in the category of best film and was nominated in the same year to receive the Golden Spike at the Valladolid International Film Festival.

== See also ==
- The Blue Room (2014)
