= Nos vemos, papá =

Nos Vemos Papa
- Directed by: Lucía Carreras
- Screenplay by: Lucía Carreras
- Produced by: Edher Campos; Luis Salinas; Rodrigo Bello; Rodrigo Trujillo
- Starring: Cecilia Suárez; Marcelo D' Andrea; Arturo Barba; Gabriela de la Garza; Moiz Arizmendi
- Cinematography: Germán Lammers
- Edited by: Figueroa Jara
- Music by: Christian Basso
- Release date: 2011
- Running time: 89 minutes
- Country: Mexico
- Language: Spanish

Nos vemos papa (transl. See you, Dad) is a 2012 Mexican drama film directed by Lucía Carreras. The film is Lucía's first directorial venture. It was an official entry for the 17th International Film Festival of Kerala

== Synopsis ==
Pilar loses the one thing in life that mattered to her and, from that moment on, time stops. The present begins blending with the past, and she withdraws into a world of her own. The film is a drama about the emotions connected to the loss of someone on whom a person's life depends.

== Cast ==
- Cecilia Suárez ... Pilar
- Moisés Arizmendi ...Marco
- Gabriela de la Garza ... Gabriela
- Arturo Barba ... José
- Marcelo D'Andrea ... Juan Guillen
- Verónica Langer ... Tía Úrsula
- Elisa De Llaca ... Mimi
