= La Portuaria =

La Portuaria is an Argentine rock band formed at the beginning of the 1990s. The band developed a fusion sound, constructing Latin rhythms upon a base strongly influenced by jazz and rhythm 'n' blues. The line-up included Christian Basso on bass and Sebastián Schachtel on keyboards, with Diego Frenkel providing guitar and vocals. They have released seven discs, making them an important presence in the Argentine music scene of the 1990s. They were active and popular between 1989-1996 and 2000-2010. They reunited in 2018.

== Discography ==
1989 Rosas rojas [Red Roses]
1989 Palabras de amor [Words of Love] EP
1991 El bar de la calle Rodney [Rodney Street's Bar] SP
1991 Los mejores amigos [The Best Friends] SP
1991 Escenas de la vida amorosa [Scenes of a Love Life]
1993 Devorador de corazones [Heart Eater]
1995 Huija [An Argentine Gaucho scream to gather the cattle on the farm]
1996 La Portuaria en Vivo [Live Album]
2001 Me mata la vida [Life Kills Me]
2002 Hasta despertar [Until We Wake Up] EP
2003 10.000 km
2005 Río [River]
2008 La vaca atada [Tied Cow]
