= Christian Basso =

Argentine musician

Christian Basso (born September 27, 1966), is an Argentine musician, known as both a composer and a multi-instrumentalist.

He has created music pieces for theater, dance, installations, television and films. Among his most recent creations is the music for Korean feature Secret Sunshine by renowned filmmaker Lee Chang-dong, film which was awarded a Best Actress Award in Cannes 2007.

His music combines elements from tango, Italian music, jazz and Argentine folklore with the classical and traditional features of soundtrack composers.

Throughout his over twenty-year career, he became well known in the local scene as bassist and musician of diverse projects next to such artists as Charly Garcia, Gustavo Cerati, Richard Coleman, Andrés Calamaro, Daniel Melingo, Javier Malosetti, Maria Gabriela Epumer, among others; and mainly with La Portuaria, band of which he was mastermind and founding member next to Diego Frenkel. This group became key in the music renewal scene of the 1990s in Argentina for it combined sounds, rhythms and instruments characteristic of the so-called world music with rock. His themes Selva and El Bar de la Calle Rodney remained in the first positions of best-selling charts for weeks.

As soloist he edited Profanía and La Penthalpha, creations which delve deeply into a search for a more personal sound that embraces the spirit and influences of the immigrants’ culture. Both projects feature soprano Eva Faludi (Coro Polifonico Nacional), American singer Kal Cahoone (Lilium, Tarantella); and music arranger Alejandro Terán (Hypnofon), among others.

¨Basso proposes a music of strong European accent with port, cabaret and vaudeville scents. It echoes melancholic violins, mandolins and accordions, next to spaghetti-western twang guitars. It is a deeply evocative sound which recognizes predecessors like Ennio Morricone, Nino Rota and, more recently, the group Calexico and ´bad seed´ Barry Adamson”. Claudio Kleiman / Rolling Stone Magazine
