= Unión Hidalgo =

- Municipality and town
- Location in Mexico
- Coordinates: 16°28′30″N 94°49′56″W
- Country: Mexico
- State: Oaxaca

Area
  - Total: 132.69 km^{2} (51.23 sq mi)

Population (2005)
  - Total: 12,983
- Time zone: UTC-6 (Central Standard Time)

Unión Hidalgo is a town and municipality in Oaxaca in south-western Mexico. It is part of the Juchitán District in the west of the Istmo de Tehuantepec region.

== Geography ==
The municipality covers an area of 132.69 km^{2} at an average height of 20 meters above sea level. The weather is warm, sub-humid with summer rains.

=== Flora and fauna ===
Flora include Guanacaste, mesquite, cactus, fruit trees (mango, tamarind, coconut, papaya) and pastures. Wild fauna includes Coyote, skunk, armadillo, badger, rabbit, dove, quail, rook and iguana.

== Demography ==
As of 2005, the municipality had 3,236 households with a total population of 12,983 of whom 7,230 spoke an indigenous language.

== Economy ==
Economic activity includes cultivating corn, beans, sorghum, melon and watermelon, and animal husbandry including cattle, goats, sheep, horses and poultry. Fishing is of great economic importance. Some households also manufacture goods woven from palms. Many of the people are engaged in trade and tourism.

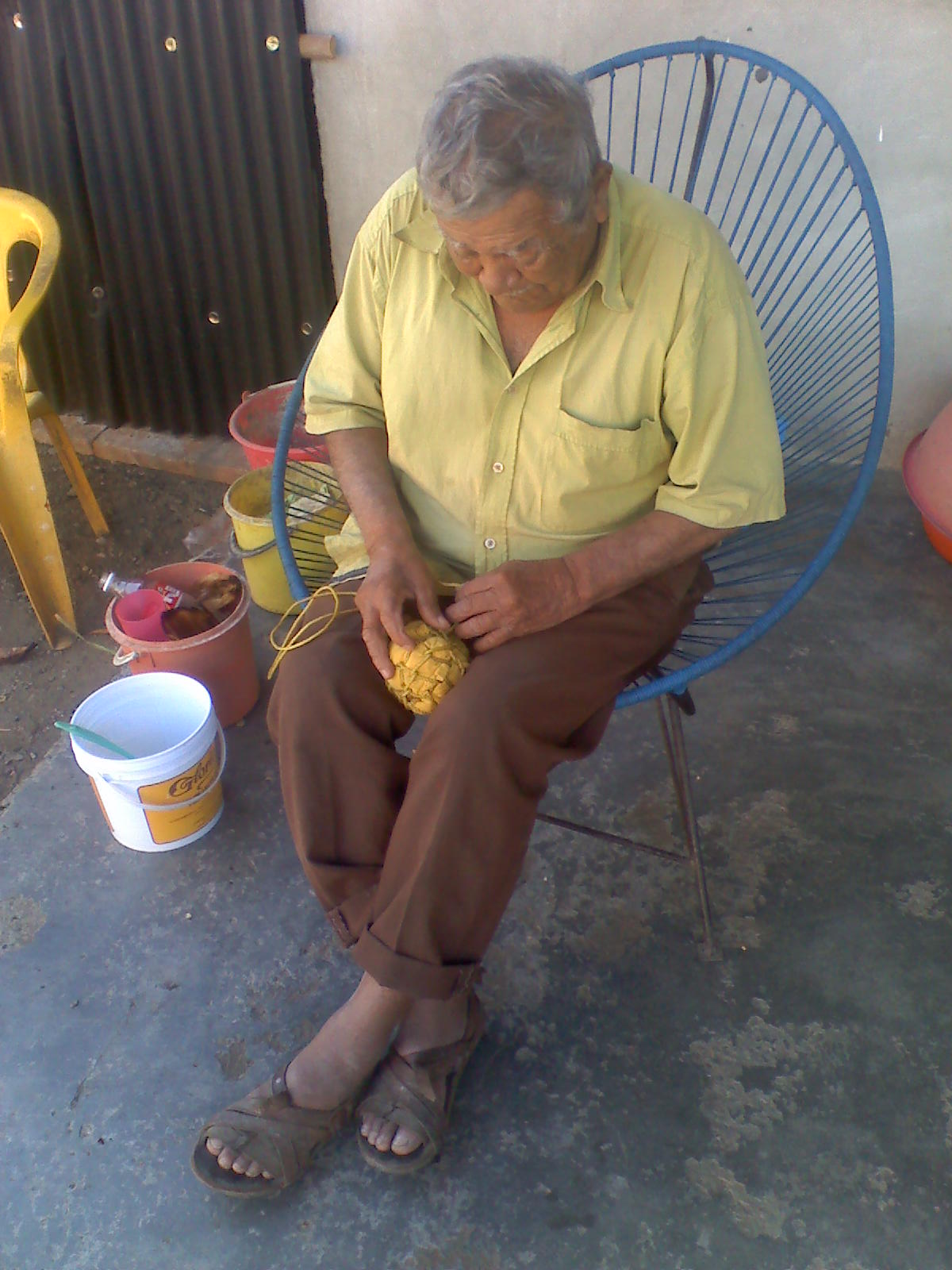
Preparing the Tapu (cloth ball) in Unión Hidalgo
