= Mujeres asesinas (2008 TV series) =

- DVD cover of Season 1
- Created by: Marisa Grinstein
- Written by: Damián Szifrón
- Directed by: Carlos García Agraz; María Fernanda Suárez; Álvaro Curiel; Chava Cartas; Pepe Castro
- Country of origin: Mexico
- Original language: Spanish
- No. of seasons: 3
- No. of episodes: 40

Production
- Executive producers: Alex Balassa; Pedro Torres; Ivan Aranda; Gabriela Torres
- Producers: Jacobo Becerril; María Auxiliadora Barrios; Pedro Damián
- Cinematography: Germán Lammers; Beto Casillas; Martín Boege
- Production company: Televisa

Original release
- Network: Las Estrellas; Univision
- Release: 17 June 2008 – 21 December 2010

Related
- Mujeres asesinas (2005); Killer Women (2014); Mujeres asesinas (2022)

Mujeres asesinas (Killer Women) is a Mexican drama and psychological thriller television series produced by Pedro Torres. The series is an adaptation of the Argentine series of the same name, produced by Pol-ka from 2005 to 2008.

== Plot ==
Mujeres Asesinas is a series that shows the dark side of women who have been mistreated or abused and become cruel murderers. The series shows how violence and death can overcome the feminine mind.

Each episode shows a different story of a woman who has committed homicide. These women are motivated by multiple passions such as love, hatred, resentment, vengeance, lunacy, despair, fear, anger, addiction, salvation and redemption. Doctor Sofía Capellan and her team of experts try to solve the murders perpetrated by the women.

== DIEM ==
In the series the Departamento de Investigacion Especializado en Mujeres (Department of Investigation Specializing in Women), is an agency which is in charge of helping women. This agency confronts and resolves brutal crimes in which women are also victims. The Department of Investigation Specializing in Women (DIEM) is an original addition to this version (the Mexican version) as it was not present in the Argentine version.

First Season

- Rosa Maria Bianchi as Doctor Sofia Capellan
- Renato Bartilotti as Lieut. Humberto Camacho
- Laisha Wilkins as Lieut. Lucia Alvarez

The first season began on 17 June 2008, with the episode "Sonia, Desalmada", starring Leticia Calderón and ended on 23 July 2008, with the episode "Emma, Costurera", starring Verónica Castro. The slogan for the first season was "No Permitas Que Tu Mujer Vea Esta Nueva Serie" ("Don't let your wife watch this new series").

Second Season

Season two began on 14 July 2009, with the episode of "Clara, Fantasiosa", starring Edith González and ended on August 25 with the episode "Carmen, Honrada", starring Carmen Salinas. The theme song for the second season was "Que Emane" sung by Gloria Trevi.

The second season's slogan was "Mueres Por Que Tu Mujer La Vea" ("you'll be dying to let your wife watch it").

Third Season

The third season began on 21 September 2010, with the episode of "Irma, de los Peces", starring Jaqueline Bracamontes and ended with "Las Cotuchas, Empresarias" starring María Rojo, Pilar Pellicer and Patricia Reyes Spíndola. In the U.S. the series premiered on 13 January 2011, on Univision with the episode "Luz, Arrolladora" Cynthia Klitbo, and only aired seven episodes, before it was discontinued for unknown reasons. Season three had two different theme songs depending on the episode. The first is "Alma Perdida", sung by Ana Bárbara, while the other is "Con Las Manos Atadas", sung by Yuri, though Yuri's song never opened any of the episodes that were aired in the U.S.

The slogan for the third season was "A Veces El Corazón Habla Con Sangre" ("Sometimes The Heart Speaks With Blood"). However, in the United States, it was "Porque La Tercera Vez, Es La Que Duele Más" ("Because the third time is the one that hurts the most").

== Episodes ==
=== Series overview ===
Series	Episodes	Originally released	
Series	Episodes	First released	Last released
1	13	17 June 2008	31 July 2008
2	13	14 July 2009	25 August 2009
3	14	21 September 2010	21 December 2010

=== Season 1 (2008) ===
No. overall	No. in series	Title	Directed by	Original release date	Prod. code
1	1	"Sonia, Desalmada"	Carlos García Agraz	17 June 2008	101
Featured actress: Leticia Calderon
2	2	"Mónica, Acorralada"	María Fernanda Suárez	19 June 2008	102
Featured actress: Irán Castillo
3	3	"Margarita, Ponsoñoza"	María Fernanda Suárez	24 June 2008	103
Featured actress: Isela Vega
4	4	"Jéssica, Tóxica"	María Fernanda Suárez	26 June 2008	104
Featured actress: Alejadra Barros
5	5	"Martha, Asfixiante"	Carlos García Agraz	1 July 2008	105
Featured actress: Nailea Norvid
6	6	"Claudia, Cuchillera"	Álvaro Curiel	3 July 2008	106
Featured actress: Natalia Esperón
7	7	"Patricia, Vengadora"	María Fernanda Suárez	8 July 2008	107
Featured actress: Dayamanti Quintanar
8	8	"Cándida, Esperanzada"	María Fernanda Suárez	10 July 2008	108
Featured actress: Lucía Méndez
9	9	"Emilia, Cocinera"	Carlos García Agraz	15 July 2008	109
Featured actress: Maria Rojo
10	10	"Sandra, Trepadora"	Carlos García Agraz	17 July 2008	110
Featured actress: Itatí Cantoral
11	11	"Cristina, Rebelde"	Carlos García Agraz	22 July 2008	111
12	12	"Ana, Corrosiva"	María Fernanda Suárez	24 July 2008	112
Featured actress: Cecilia Suarez
13	13	"Emma, Costurera"	Carlos García Agraz	31 July 2008	113
Featured actress: Verónica Castro

=== Season 2 (2009) ===
No. overall	No. in series	Title	Directed by	Original release date	Prod. code
14	1	"Clara, Fantasiosa"	Carlos García Agraz	14 July 2009	201
15	2	"Las Garrido, Codiciosas"	María Fernanda Suárez	16 July 2009	202
16	3	"Laura, Confundida"	Carlos García Agraz	21 July 2009	203
17	4	"Ana y Paula, Ultrajadas"	Mariana Chenillo	23 July 2009	204
18	5	"Rosa, Heredera"	Carlos García Agraz	28 July 2009	205
19	6	"Tita Garza, Estafadora"	María Fernanda Suárez	30 July 2009	206
20	7	"Julia, Encubridora"	María Fernanda Suárez	4 August 2009	207
21	8	"Soledad, Cautiva"	Álvaro Curiel	6 August 2009	208
22	9	"Ofelia, Enamorada"	María Fernanda Suárez	11 August 2009	209
23	10	"Cecilia, Prohibida"	María Fernanda Suárez	13 August 2009	210
24	11	"María, Pescadera"	Carlos García Agraz	18 August 2009	211
25	12	"Tere, Desconfiada"	Álvaro Curiel	20 August 2009	212
26	13	"Carmen, Honrada"	Carlos Garcìa Agraz	25 August 2009	213

=== Season 3 (2010) ===
No. overall	No. in series	Title	Directed by	Original release date	Prod. code
27	1	"Irma, La De Los Peces"	María Fernanda Suárez	21 September 2010	301
28	2	"Elena, Protectora"	Carlos García Agraz	28 September 2010	302
29	3	"Azucena, Liberada"	Carlos García Agraz	5 October 2010	303
30	4	"Elvira y Mercedes, Justicieras"	Chava Carta	12 October 2010	304
31	5	"Eliana, Cuñada"	Chava Carta	19 October 2010	305
32	6	"Las Blanco, Viudas"	Carlos García Agraz	26 October 2010	306
33	7	"Thelma, Impaciente"	María Fernanda Suárez	2 November 2010	307
34	8	"Annette y Ana, Nobles"	Chava Carta	9 November 2010	308
35	9	"Paula, Bailarina"	María Fernanda Suárez	16 November 2010	309
36	10	"Marta, Manipuladora"	Carlos García Agraz	23 November 2010	310
37	11	"María, Fanática"	Pepe Castro	30 November 2010	311
38	12	"Luz, Arrolladora"	Álvaro Curiel	7 December 2010	312
39	13	"Maggie, Pensionada"	Pepe Castro	14 December 2010	313
40	14	"Las Cotuchas, Empresarias"	María Fernanda Suárez	21 December 2010	314
