= Lo que es el amor =

Mexican telenovela

- Created by: Monica Agudelo (original story); Santos Sisneiros
- Developed by: Azteca; Azteca Digital: Elisa Salinas; Juan David Burns
- Written by: Victor Civeira; Gabriel Santos
- Directed by: Eloy Ganuza
- Starring: Fernando Lujan; Claudia Ramirez; Leonardo García; Christian Meier; José Alonso; Patricia Llaca; Víctor Huggo Martin
- Opening theme: "Usted Se me Llevo la Vida" by Alexandre Pires "Héroe" by Enrique Iglesias
- Country of origin: Mexico
- Original language: Spanish
- No. of episodes: 140

Production
- Producer: Alicia Carvajal
- Production locations: Mexico City, Mexico
- Camera setup: Multi-camera
- Running time: 35-65 minutes
- Production company: TV Azteca

Original release
- Network: Azteca 13
- Release: June 25, 2001 – January 4, 2002

Lo que es el amor is a Mexican telenovela produced by Azteca in 2001 starring Claudia Ramirez and Leonardo Garcia. It is a remake of the Colombian television series Hombres.

== Cast ==
- Claudia Ramirez as Tania Lomeli
- Leonardo García as Roman Castellanos
- Fernando Lujan as Emiliano Lomeli
- Verónica Langer as Jackie Lomeli
- José Alonso as Fausto Ocampo
- Christian Meier as Efren Villarr
- Víctor Huggo Martin as Tomas Cantueal
- Victor González as Pablo Rivas
- Michel Brown as Christian Ocampo
- Mark Tacher as Tadeo Márquez
- Patricia Llaca as Alex Palacios
- Anna Ciocchetti as Anabel Cantu
- Adriana Louvier as Julieta Rivas
- Romina Castro as Clarita
- Raúl Arrieta as Gonzalez
- Mónica Dionne as Isela Guzman
- Roberto Medina as Moises
- Guillermo Murray as Octavio Castellanos
- Elsa Aguirre as Abril Castellanos
- Martha Navarro as Doña Adriana
- Fernando Sarfatti as Joaquin
- Montserrat Ontiveros as Nora
- Francisco de la O as Edson Duran
- Gabriela de la Garza as Ximena
- Roberto Sosa as Camilo
- Eduardo Victoria as Carlos
- Gabriela Canudas as Adriana
- Carlos Torres Torrija as Francisco
- Héctor Arredondo as Rene
- Alejandra Prado as Catalina
- Issabella Camil as Gloria Ocampo
