= Susana Alexander =

Mexican actress

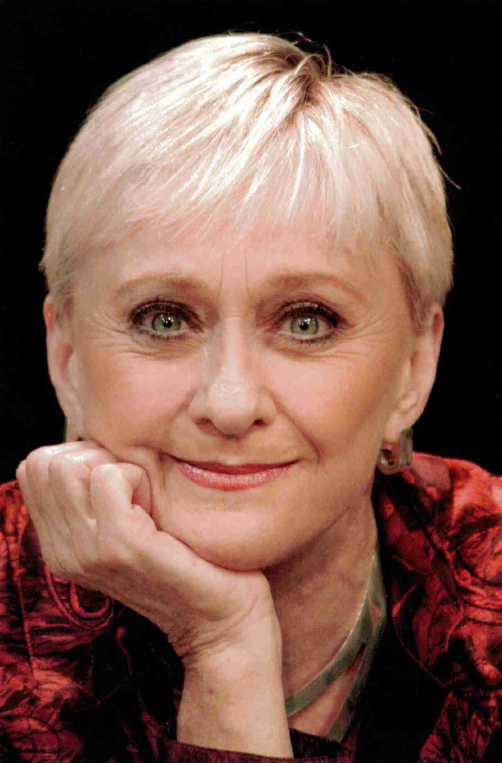
- Born: Suzanne Ellen Rose Alexander-Katz Kauffmann; 3 July 1943 (age 82); Mexico City, Mexico
- Occupations: Actress, hostess, director, producer, translator, teacher, dancer
- Years active: 1950–present
- Spouse: Julián Zugazagoitia (m. 1963)
- Relatives: Brigitte Alexander (mother); Sophie Alexander (niece)

Suzanne Ellen Rose Alexander-Katz Kauffmann (born 3 July 1943), commonly known as Susana Alexander, is a Mexican actress, hostess, director, producer, translator, teacher and dancer.

== Early life ==
Alexander was born in Mexico City, the daughter of Alfredo Alexander-Katz and Brígida Kauffmann Rosenstein, German Jewish immigrants who left Europe during World War II. Her mother, commonly known as Brígida Alexander, was a pioneer of Mexican television who wrote and produced the first Mexican telenovela, Los ángeles de la calle (1952).

== Career ==
In 1950, she made her professional debut as a television hostess. She made her film debut in Yo, el mujeriego (1963), starring Antonio Aguilar. In 1968, she played the villainous Carolina de Frizac in the telenovela Chucho el Roto (starring Manuel López Ochoa in the title role) and the films La vida de Chucho el Roto (1970), Yo soy Chucho el Roto (1970), Los amores de Chucho el Roto (1970), El inolvidable Chucho el Roto (1971). She had a starring role in the Capulina comedy El bueno para nada (1973).

== Selected filmography ==
- Yo, el mujeriego (1963)
- El bueno para nada (1973)
- Gaby: A True Story (1987)

== Selected television work ==
- Sheena, Queen of the Jungle (1955–1956)
- Chucho el Roto (1968)
- Intriga (1968)
- Mañana será otro día (1976)
- Cuando llega el amor (1990)
- Más allá del puente (1994)
- El amor no es como lo pintan (2000–2001)
- Súbete a mi moto (2002)
