= Los plateados =

- Directed by: Silvana Zuanetti
- Starring: Tamara Monserrat; Mauricio Islas; Dominika Paleta; Humberto Zurita; Marta Aura
- Opening theme: "Por amor a la verdad" by Tres de Copas
- Country of origin: Mexico
- Original language: Spanish
- No. of episodes: 148

Production
- Producer: Marcelo Mejía
- Running time: 48 minutes

Original release
- Network: Telemundo
- Release: March 28 – October 31, 2005

Related
- Gitanas; Corazón Partido

Los Plateados (The Silverplated) is a 2005 Mexican telenovela co-produced by the Mexican company Argos Comunicación and Telemundo. It stars Mauricio Islas, Tamara Monserrat, Dominika Paleta and Humberto Zurita; and is a historical drama set in Mexico during the time of the Porfiriato and Mexican Revolution and incorporates themes such as justice and equality. The telenovela is the American adaptation of the Chilean telenovela Los Pincheira, produced in 2004 by TVN Chile.

== Plot ==
This is a historical telenovela with its roots in the beginning of the 20th century beginning with the Porfiriato in Mexico. The Silverplated are Robinhood bandits whose only mission in life is to fight for justice and avenge their father's unjust death. They steal from the rich to give to the poor.

The main character of the story is Emilio Gallardo (Humberto Zurita)a villain. Emilio is a wealthy landowner, seducer, and always-winner in life. But one thing he lacks: a male son and heir. The basic conflict of the story is a mystery not revealed until near the end: That conflict is whether Emilio will ever get his son. (The story might be better entitled, "Emilio quiere hijo." What the audience does not know until near the end is that Emilio is actually sterile; thus he can never accomplish his desired goal. Emilio is sterile because his mother had him sterilized by a curandera (or witch) as a child. His mother thought her husband so wicked that his blood line should not be passed on through Emilio. He is utterly selfish, sadistically cruel, and unfaithful by nature and believes that he can have every woman he wishes for. In order to produce a male heir, he longs to marry a much younger women, the young and beautiful Camila Castañeda (Tamara Monserrat). Unbeknownst to his wife, for years Emilio has had a wild sexual relationship with his amante, her older sister Luciana Castañeda (Dominika Paleta). And unbeknownst to Emilio, while Camila is putting off Emilio on consummating the marriage sexually, Camila manages to get deflowered by Gabriel soon after she exchanges marriage vows with Emilio. Eventually, however, Camila lets Emilio have his way with her once, which covers her pregnancy caused by the Robin Hood Gabriel. Thus Camila gives birth to the male son which Emilio was wanting. Although Camila does not love Emilio, her mother Ofelia (Wendy de los Cobos) tries to convince her that love will come with time. Thus this telenovela uses the often used plot line of two sisters in conflict over one man—first Emilio, then Gabriel.

Camila does not even suspect that on the day of her train ride to her wedding with Emilio, she will meet the love of her life Gabriel Campuzano (Mauricio Islas) when he robs the train. Gabriel is the leader of the infamous group of bandits "Los Plateados (The Silverplated), whose members include his younger brothers Tomás Campuzano (Rodrigo Oviedo) and Manuel Campuzano (Juan Carlos Martín del Campo) and their sister Ximena Campuzano (Angélica Celaya). In the first movement of this story, Gabriel is a brave and powerful man who enchants Camila with a single gaze. Together with his brothers and sister they live hidden in a cave (like Batman); after their father, Sebastian Campuzano, in the pre-history of this telenovela, was unjustly accused of killing a friend and neighboring hacienda owner and was subsequently shot by firing squad.

The Silverplated vow to avenge their father's execution, while robbing from the rich hacienda owners to provide for the poor. When attacking Emilio's ranch on the day of his wedding, Gabriel kidnaps Emilio's wife to give him a lesson concerning his attitude toward those he considers inferior. Gabriel falls in love with Camila and thus begins the turbulent love story between him and the wife of Emilio Gallardo, the man he holds responsible for his father's unjust killing. Seeking revenge against The Silverplated for kidnapping his wife, Emilio crosses paths with the four Campuzano siblings who are fighting to avenge their father's death; and against a backdrop of hatred, revenge, and prejudices; a revolutionary war breaks out that will test Gabriel and Camila's love for each other -- though the war is fought mostly "offstage" near the end of the story and glossed over.

The plot has 3 movements: In the opening movement, Gabriel leads Los Plateados in derring-do banditry vs. the rich (like Robin Hood). In the second movement, Gabriel surrenders himself to Emilio who blackmails him into surrendering to the authorities lest Emilio destroy the innocent. Then Gabriel becomes a Christ figure, with arms outstretched as if on a cross, put in prison, stabbed, left for dead—when a sort of Mary Magdalene figure appears to raise him from the dead, as it were. For the 3rd movement: after getting over his crucifixion (as it were), Gabriel has a second coming to the countryside where Emilio's hacienda is. But at this point in the story, Gabriel transforms from a heroic bandit to a foppishly dressed (as with lace) country squire, who cannot even beat up Gabriel in a fist fight or outdraw him with a pistol. In the finale Gabriel appears to be shot to death by Emilio, but it turns out that a "magic brooch" (inherited from Gabriel's father) deflected Emilio's bullet. At the end Emilio's omnipotent power is finally ended by Gabriel's scoundrel brother, who shoots Emilio in the back with a rifle as Emilio is galloping off to escape on a horse.

== Cast ==
=== Main cast ===
Actor	Character	Description
Tamara Monserrat	Camila Castañeda de Gallardo	Main heroine, in love with Gabriel, but married to Don Emilio.
Mauricio Islas	Gabriel Campuzano	Main hero, the leader of The Silverplated, in love with Camila.
Humberto Zurita	Don Emilio Gallardo	Main male antagonist, an arrogant landowner and merciless murderer.
Dominika Paleta	Luciana Castañeda	Main female antagonist, sister of Camila.
Rodrigo Oviedo	Tomás Campuzano	Protagonist, younger brother of Gabriel, member of the band.
Angélica Celaya	Ximena Campuzano	Protagonist, younger sister of Gabriel, member of the band.
Juan Carlos Martín del Campo	Manuel Campuzano	Protagonist, youngest brother of Gabriel, member of the band.
Wendy de los Cobos	Ofelia Castañeda	Mother of Camila, arrogant and greedy.
Gloria Peralta	Samia Bashur	Friend of Camila and Gabriel
Eduardo Victoria	Andrés Castañeda	Co-protagonist, son of Ofelia Castañeda, elder brother of Camila Castañeda, husband of Isabel Villegas.
María Aura	Esperanza Castañeda	Youngest daughter of Ofelia.
Marta Aura	Augusta Villegas	Antagonist, Friend of Don Emilio Gallardo, mother of Aurelio Villegas.
Héctor Arredondo	Leonardo Villegas	Co-protagonist, son of Aurelio, in love with Ximena, member of the band.
Teresa Tuccio	Isabel Villegas	Co-protagonist, aunt of Leonardo, wife of Andres.
Álvaro Guerrero	Aurelio Villegas	Son of Augusta Villegas, father of Leonardo.
Claudia Lobo	Irene Villegas	Wife of Aurelio Villegas, mother of Leonardo.
Zamia Fandiño	Xochitl	Camila's assistant and best friend
Michelle Vargas	Layla Baschur	daughter of Samia and Kamal Bashur, in love with Manuel
Guillermo González Quintanilla Vazquez	Nicanor	Emilio's right hand
Alberto Guerra	Yasir Bashur	Son of Samia and Kamal Bashur.
Rocío Verdejo	Yamile Yamile Ibn Zahib	
Gizhet Galatea	Dolores	
Carlos Torres Torrija	Julian Olmedo	Husband of Luciana Castañeda.
Marco Treviño	Colonel Mejia	

=== Secondary cast ===
- Marú Bravo as Josefa
- Joaquín Cosio as Kamal Bashur, husband of Samia Bashur, a merchant
- Carlos Corona as Víctor Villegas, son of Aurelio Villegas, a photographer
- Mayra Sierra as Eva, member of the band, in love with Tomás
- Alberto Guerra as Yasir Bashur
- Luis Yeverino as Halim Bashur
- Aurora Gil as Angeles Villegas
- Damayanti Quintanar as Antonia/Toñita
- Angel Chehin as Ismail Ibn Zahib
- Alberto Trujillo as Lorenzo Bustamante
- Marco Antonio Aguirre as Dimas Garcia
- Omar Ayala as El Rajado

== International releases ==
Country	TV Channels	Local Title
Armenia	Shant TV	Սիրել թշնամուն
