= Corazón Partido =

- Created by: Pablo Illanes
- Developed by: Telemundo; Argos Comunicación
- Directed by: Moises Ortiz Urquidi; Pablo Gomez Saenz
- Starring: Danna García; José Ángel Llamas
- Theme music composer: Ernesto Anaya
- Opening theme: "Corazón partido" performed by Willie Colon
- Countries of origin: Chile (2004, Original Version); United States; Mexico
- Original language: Spanish
- No. of episodes: 90

Production
- Executive producers: Carlos Payan; Epigmenio Ibarra
- Producer: Daniel Camhi
- Production location: Mexico
- Editor: Horacio Valle Ramos
- Camera setup: Multi-camera
- Running time: 42-45 minutes

Original release
- Network: Telemundo
- Release: November 1, 2005 – June 16, 2006

Related
- Los Plateados; Amores de mercado

Corazón Partido (Broken Heart), is an American Spanish-language telenovela that aired on Telemundo and Argos Comunicacion. This limited-run series ran for 90 episodes from November 1, 2005, to June 16, 2006. This telenovela was aired in 17 countries around the world.

== Story ==
"Corazón Partido" tells the story of a young woman that returns to her country in search of the son that was tragically taken from her arms at birth. Out of the 25 million people that inhabit the city, she will meet a married man and fall desperately in love with him, without knowing that he is the adoptive father of her lost child.

== Cast ==
- Danna García - Aura Echarri Medina
- José Ángel Llamas - Adrian Rincon / Santiago Rincon
- Saby Kamalich - Virginia Graham
- Carlos Torres Torrija - César Echarri #1
- Julio Bracho Castillo - César Echarri #2
- Ximena Rubio - Nelly Zambrano
- Anna Ciocchetti - Fernanda Medina
- Khotan Fernández - Sergio Garza
- Alejandro Cava - Ramón Cadena 'El Tanque'
- Alejandra Lazcano - Claudia
- Angeles Marin - Ernestina de Zambrano
- Carlos de la Mota - German Garza
- Enrique Singer - Rogelio Garza
- Evangelina Martinez - Consuelo 'Chelo' Delgado
- Giovan Ramos - Nelson Córdoba
- Gizeth Galatea - Rocio
- Juan Carlos Barreto - Erasmo
- Juan Luis Orendain - Gregorio Medina Arce
- Karina Mora - Alejandra Garza
- Luis Gerardo Mendez - Ignacio 'Nacho' Echarri
- Paco Mauri - Amador Zambrano
- Patricia Marrero - Filomena Bolado
- Sergio Adriano Ortiz Garda - Esteban Rincon Zambrano
- Alejandro Felipe - Piquin
- Toni Helling - Betina
- Eréndira Dávalos - Rosa
- Mario Loría - Hilberto
