= Carlos Torres Torrija =

Mexican actor (born 1961)

- Born: October 28, 1961 (age 64); Mexico
- Occupation: Actor

Carlos Torres Torija is a Mexican actor, well known for his role in the TV series Gitanas. He was born on 28 October 1961, in Mexico, and he graduated from the Art Theatre school.

== Personal life ==
He was also known as Agustin Torres Torija.

== Television and filmography ==
Year	Title	Role	Notes
1997	Elisa Before the End of the World		film, as Agustin Torres Torrija
2000	The Other Conquest	Soldado Héctor	film
2001	El segundo aire	Mario	film
2003	La hija del jardinero	Carlos Eduardo Gómez-Ruíz	television
2004	Zapata: Amor en rebeldía	Cevallos	television
2004	Otro ladrillo en la pared	Ingeniero Romero	short film, as Agustin Torres Torrija
2004–2005	Gitanas	Rafael Domínguez	television
2005	Los plateados	Julian Olmedo	television
2005	Corazón partido	César Echarri	television
2006	Sexo, amor y otras perversiones	Lucio (segment "Por Amor")	film
2007	Mientras Haya Vida	Leonardo Montero	television
2008	El Juramento	Demián Martain	television
2009	Vuélveme A Querer	Dr. Alfredo Peña	television
2010	Prófugas del Destino	Polo	television
2011	Cada quien su santo	Freddy's Father	episode "El Corazón de Freddy"
2013	La Patrona	Julio Montemar	television
2015	El Señor De Los Cielos 2	Maximiliano 'Max' Miravalle	television
