= Cecilia Suárez =

Mexican actress

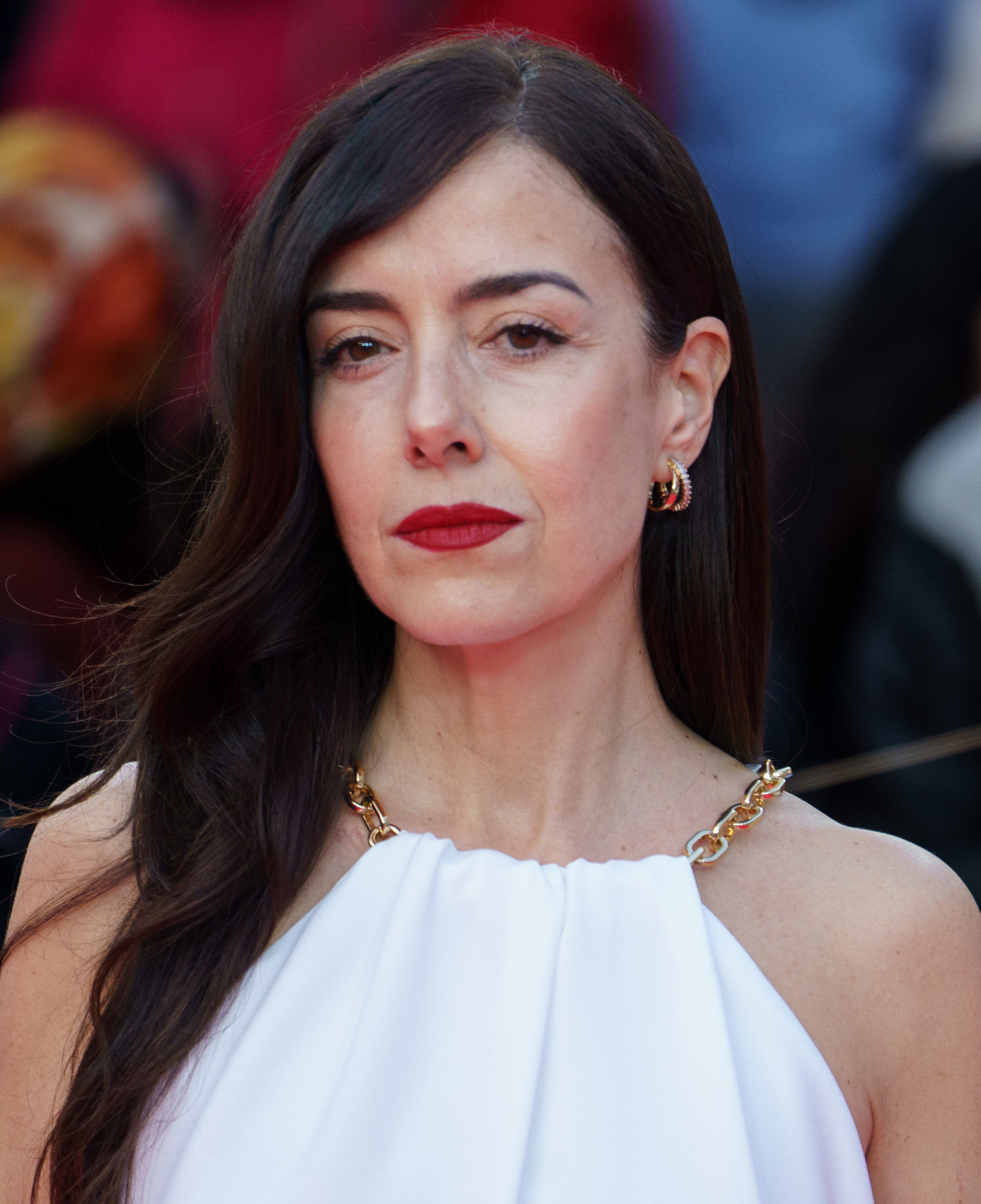
- Suárez in 2025
- Born: María Cecilia Suárez de Garay; November 22, 1971 (age 55); Tampico, Tamaulipas, Mexico
- Citizenship: Mexico; Spain
- Education: Illinois State University
- Occupations: Actress, activist
- Years active: 1992–present
- Children: 1
- Relatives: Mafer Suárez (sister)

María Cecilia Suárez de Garay (Spanish pronunciation: [seˈsilja ˈswaɾes]; born November 22, 1971) is a Mexican actress and activist working with the United Nations and European Union campaigning against femicide and violence against women. She has starred in film, television, and theater across the United States, Mexico, and Spain.

She has had roles in works including Sex, Shame and Tears, Capadocia, Nos vemos, papá, and The House of Flowers. She has been honored with three lifetime achievement awards; she was the first woman to receive Mexico's lifetime achievement award in cinema. She was also the first Spanish-speaking actress to be nominated for an Emmy, for her work on Capadocia.

Beyond campaigning against femicide, Suárez is also an activist for human rights and women's rights in Mexico and in Mexican media. Ignacio Sánchez Prado, a historian of Mexican cinema, writes that she has an "iconic status as an actress in Mexico's most successful movies".^{:152}

== Early life ==
Suárez was born and raised in Tampico, a small coastal area in the northern Mexican state of Tamaulipas. She says that there was no theater there, and that her parents shielded her from too much play-acting as a child because "childhood was something to prolong and respect". She has three sisters, including the director Mafer Suárez; her father was Engino "Ben" and her mother is M^{a̰} Elena. Suárez also has family from Asturias, Spain, and holds Spanish dual nationality from her grandfather, an Asturian who immigrated to Mexico.

== Career ==
Suárez has said she never dreamed of being an actor. She moved to the United States in 1991 for university, attending Illinois State University; (Note: Most sources say that Suárez attended the University of Illinois, but she is listed as a '95 alumnus of Illinois State by this institution.) having intended to study law, she instead moved into theater, inspired by her older sister Mafer. She graduated as valedictorian of the theater program in 1995, receiving the Jean Scharfenberg Scholarship. As she left college, she also received the Steppenwolf Theatre Acting Fellowship Award, and her debut was at Chicago's Steppenwolf Theatre. With ties to the city, she is still a member of the Chicago-based Theater with a View/Teatro Vista group. While in Illinois, Suárez performed the lead role in several classical plays, (Note: See her filmography and awards page.) and took part in the Illinois Shakespeare Festival. In the late 1990s she starred in Sex, Shame and Tears, the second film of the Nuevo Cine Mexicano, which was "her first triumph". When asked about her experience making Sex, Shame and Tears, she responded that she remembers it very positively, because it is how she "became a part of the story of the cinema of [her] country".

Around this time, Suárez met future filmmaker Manolo Caro, when he was 14 years old. She went to a recital at his school in Guadalajara; her cousin was Caro's teacher and introduced the pair. Caro then studied architecture, but they became friends when he moved to Mexico City to pursue filmmaking. Suárez is described as Caro's muse, and she has starred in all but one of his works; she did not have a role in Amor de mis amores because Caro "did not want to force it".

After the success of Sex, Shame and Tears, Suárez worked largely in major motion pictures in the early 2000s, including in Hollywood films Spanglish, The Three Burials of Melquiades Estrada, and The Air I Breathe. This was complemented with work across Mexican film and television. Suárez worked alongside actor Gael García Bernal on multiple occasions in both mediums, as well as with the director Ernesto Contreras, having acclaimed roles in two of his films. She also continued successfully working in theater, having roles alongside Juan Manuel Bernal on the stage as well as in film and television during this period. During the 2000s she was nominated for her first Ariel Award, among other accolades. She began starring in the HBO series Capadocia in 2008, first playing female prisoner La Bambi and then returning to the show as a prison psychologist after Bambi died. As the show dealt with more intense topics and was one of the first shows based around different personalities in a women's prison, Suárez spent time researching and then mentally preparing for both roles. In 2009, she was nominated for an Emmy Award for playing La Bambi, being the first Spanish-speaking actress to receive such a nomination.

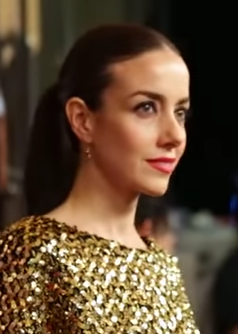
Suárez on the red carpet in 2011 for Nos vemos, papá.

In the 2010s, Caro began his career as a successful director and screenwriter. Suárez starred in his works, as well as the works of her sister, among other projects. After her son was born in 2010 she chose to stay in Mexico City for work. Despite many of her films from this period being attached to Caro, Suárez says she does not feel boxed-in as an actress, nor like she is playing it safe, as she works with Caro on projects that she knows he has put a lot of care into and that are challenging.

Suárez starred in the film Nos vemos, papá, which focuses on how grief is expressed, exploring this through her character's response to the death of her father. The film was released shortly after Suárez's own father died at the end of 2012. Suárez said that though it was "a remarkable coincidence" to her family, she believed it was "no accident", and that her role in the film had happened to help her deal with her own grief.

Following her second Ariel nomination in 2015, Suárez took roles in 2016 in the Netflix original series Sense8 and the Netflix-distributed film Macho, as well as the comedy film Cuando los hijos regresan with Carmen Maura. In 2017 she joined Netflix again, signing on to play a role in another original created by Caro, The House of Flowers, and also began work on the American film Overboard. Gaining international recognition for her role as Paulina de la Mora in The House of Flowers, Suárez remained with the streaming network to star in more works created by Caro, and also voiced a role in the Spanish-language version of Klaus, Netflix's first animated feature film.

Alejandro Mancilla, profiling the actress in 2018, wrote that although Suárez does not like working in telenovelas and only did a few at the start of her career, "the essence of Suárez is in her work in movies and series whose content and setting is eminently Mexican". She primarily works in the Spanish language and in Mexico on Mexican productions, not being supportive of "American culture's version" of Mexican narratives and disliking being offered only stereotypical roles. However, she has explained that she has no objection to working in Hollywood when the role is right, having only taken a break from international productions to settle down when her son was born – she also took a four-year break from theater after becoming pregnant. Her first Hollywood film was 2004's Spanglish; she said she took the role because she wanted to work with its director, James L. Brooks. She has said that she enjoys playing diverse roles and performing in different genres.

In 2015, Suárez directed a short play, saying she would consider more directing, but only in theater; she says theater is her "greatest passion" and "refuge". She also has a program called TNT + Film, where she presents interviews, facts, and news about Mexican cinema. In 2009 she wrote the chapter "Una habitación propia" ("A room of one's own") for the book Gritos y susurros II: experiencias intempestivas de otras 39 mujeres.

== Activism ==
Suárez is known to combat injustices in Mexico by using her platform to speak out on issues; Caro has said that she has faced backlash because people in Mexico are not used to such direct speech. She runs a project within Mexican public hospitals, with support from the Department of Health, to promote safe childbirth, and has spoken out against the culture of machismo; she is on the Mexican government's advisory board analyzing the representation of machismo and violence against women in media. She is also vocal about sexism within the Mexican film industry and has supported the Me Too movement.

For many years Suárez was a partner and activist with Greenpeace, after beginning a campaign with them for the protection of Mexican maize in 2006. In 2018, Suárez reflected on her work with Greenpeace, saying that the organization taught her about the world of activism.

Suárez began working with the United Nations (UN) in 2011 to create a UN Human Rights Initiative in Latin America after the Mexican government began cracking down on organized crime to the point of suppressing human rights activists. The campaign is called "Declárate", which she remains a spokeswoman of.

In 2018, Suárez was named a Spotlight Initiative Champion to the UN campaign against femicide, and she gave a lecture to the UN assembly in New York City titled "Enough" in September that year. She was one of five representatives to give a speech when opening the UN and European Union's 2019 €50 million Spotlight Initiative campaign to end femicide in Latin America. (Note: In news sources, Suárez is referred to as the UN Global Ambassador Against Femicide. (See:))

== Personal life ==
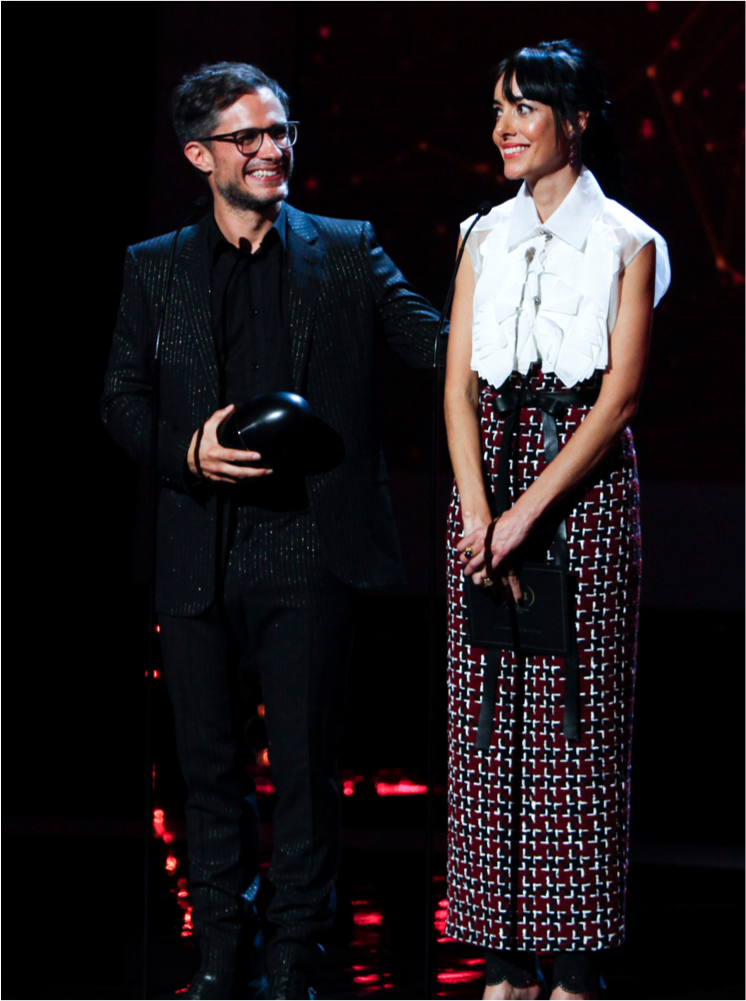
Suárez and Gael García Bernal presenting together at the Fénix Awards in 2015

In 2001, Suárez was in a relationship with Gael García Bernal, and the two were still being linked after starring in 2002's Fidel together. She then dated actor Osvaldo de León between 2009 and 2010. With de León, Suárez has a son, Teo. He was born in April 2010, and his godfather is Caro.

Suárez met de León in 2009, and they began improvising flirtatious lines when starring together in the play Othello before starting a relationship. They split in August 2010, shortly after their son was born. Suárez retained custody of Teo and, in 2015, took out a restraining order against de León on behalf of the child, claiming that he had been both physically and psychologically violent to Teo and was not making child support payments. De León refuted the allegations, though the order was ruled in Suárez's favor. In November 2019, de León spoke about their relationship for the first time since the order, saying that "everything is fine" between the pair, though his other children have not met Teo.

== Awards and honors ==
Suárez has twice been nominated for the Ariel Award. She received a nomination for an International Emmy in the Best Performance by an Actress category in 2009, for her role of La Bambi in the TV series Capadocia; she became the first native Spanish speaker and first Mexican to be nominated for this award. In 2013, she won the Best Actress award at the Guadalajara International Film Festival for her role in Tercera llamada. In 2004 and 2005 she was nominated for the Mexican MTV Movie Award, for roles in Sin ton ni sonia and Puños Rosas.

In 2018, Suárez became the first woman to receive the Premio Cuervo Tradicional, Mexico's lifetime achievement award in film and television. That same year, she received the Bazaar Actitud 43/Actitud Expresiva award, a lifetime achievement award in Spain that was presented to her by Maura, and the Mexican National Theatre lifetime achievement award. This was presented to her during a performance of A Doll's House, Part 2, where she played the lead. In November 2012, Suárez and García Bernal were named "distinguished guests" of the city of Morelia, the location of the Morelia International Film Festival, one of Mexico's largest film festivals, for their contributions to cinema.

In 2019, Suárez co-hosted the 6th Platino Awards, where she also won for playing Paulina de la Mora in The House of Flowers, in the Best Actress (TV) category. She won this again for the same role in 2020.

== Filmography and theater ==
Suárez has had over 60 film and television roles, and over 30 theatrical ones, with over 20 combined awards and nominations for her performances.
