= Óscar Figueroa (film editor) =

Mexican film editor (born 1958)

- Born: June 26, 1958 (age 67)
- Occupation: Film editor

Óscar Figueroa (born June 26, 1958) is a Mexican film editor.

Figueroa has been working in the Cinema of Mexico and Latin cinema since 1986 and has edited some 55 films in his career as of 2007. He has won and been nominated for several Ariel Awards and edited the acclaimed Mexican film El crimen del Padre Amaro in 2002.

At the moment he is also Vocal of the Coordinating Committee of the Mexican Academy of Arts and Cinematographic Sciences, A.C.

== Filmography ==
- Erase una vez en Durango (En rodaje)
- Ana y Daniel (2008)
- Parking Lot (El Muro de al lado) (2008)
- Backyard (2008)
- Amor Letra por Letra (2008)
- Euforia (2008)
- 5 dìas sin Nora (2007)
- SPAM (Sr. Paniko) (2007)
- El Libro de Piedra (2007)
- Los Fabulosos 7 (2007)
- Kada kuien su karma (2007)
- Hasta el viento tiene miedo (2007)
- Cementerio de Papel (2007)
- Cañitas. Presencia (2007)
- Enemigos intimos (2007)
- Niñas Mal (2007)
- Nesio (2006)
- Latidos (2006/I)
- Cochinadas (2006)
- La Mirada del adiós (2006)
- Caso terminal (2006)
- De paso (2005)
- Dioses domados (2005)
- Rutina (2005)
- Hijas de su madre: Las Buenrostro (2005)
- Las Vueltas del citrillo (2005)
- Paco Chávez (2005)
- La Última noche (2005) (as Oscar Figueroa Jara)
- Espinas (2005)
- Después de la muerte (2005)
- Cero y van cuatro (2004)
- Charros (2004)
- Jai vida (2004)
- Valentina (2004)
- Dame tu cuerpo (2003)
- El Tigre de Santa Julia (2002)
- El crimen del Padre Amaro (2002)
- El Gavilán de la sierra (2002)
- Encrucijada (2002/I)
- Paso del norte (2002)
- Cuenta saldada (2000)
- No existen differencias (1999)
- Entre la tarde y la noche (1999)
- La Paloma de Marsella (1999)
- El Profeta (1998)
- ¡Que vivan los muertos! (1998)
- La Primera noche (1998)
- Un Boleto para soñar (1998)
- Educación sexual en breves lecciones (1997)
- Santo Luzbel (1997)
- Un baúl lleno de miedo (1997)
- Elisa Before the End of the World (1997)
- Unidos (1997)
- Los Vuelcos del corazón (1996)
- El Cine de luchadores (1996)
- Dos crímenes (1995)
- Bésame En La Boca (1995)
- Un Pedazo de noche (1995)
- Perfume, effecto inmediato (1994)
- Ya la hicimos (1994)
- Dulces compañias (1994)
- En un clarooscuro de la luna (1994)
- Miroslava (1993)
- Dejalo ser (1993)
- Haciendo la lucha (1993)
- Hoy no circula (1993)
- Matilde Landeta (1992)
- La Mujer de Benjamín (1991)
- Corrupción y placer (1991)
- Pueblo de madera (1990)
- Acopilco (1990)
- Morir en el golfo (1990) (as Óscar Figueroa Jara)
- Intimidad (1989)
