= Illinois Shakespeare Festival =

Coordinates: 40.4940°N 88.9653°W

- Location: Bloomington, Illinois, United States
- Founded: 1978
- Artistic director: John C. Stark
- Festival date: Annually in June, July, August
- Website: illinoisshakes.com

The Illinois Shakespeare Festival (ISF) is held in Bloomington, Illinois, United States at Ewing Theatre and in Normal, Illinois, United States at the Center for Performing Arts Theatre at Illinois State University. The Festival began in 1978 and celebrated its 45th season in 2023. The Festival has traditionally presented three plays. Although all three may be Shakespeare plays, the Festival has also included different types of theater, such as Restoration comedy, Commedia dell'arte, and works by contemporary playwrights.

The Festival is produced by the School of Theatre, Dance, and Film at the College of Fine Arts at Illinois State University. Performances take place at Ewing Cultural Center in Ewing Theatre, a re-creation of the Globe Stage complete with open air amphitheater. The Festival markets itself as "theatre under the stars." Before many nightly performances, the Festival has presented free pre-show entertainment, including live jazz, abbreviated versions of the play to come, or other light or short performances. In 2008, the Festival began shows aimed towards younger audiences called Theatre for Young Audiences, which have traditionally been performed on Wednesday and Saturday mornings.

The Festival runs from the later part of June through the middle of August.

== Production history ==
Unless otherwise noted, the plays are written by William Shakespeare.

1978

- As You Like It
- Macbeth
- Twelfth Night

1979

- Hamlet
- King Henry IV, Part 1
- The Taming of the Shrew

1980

- The Merry Wives of Windsor
- A Midsummer Night's Dream
- Romeo and Juliet

1981

- The Comedy of Errors
- Julius Caesar
- The Winter's Tale

1982

- King Henry IV, Part 2
- Love's Labour's Lost
- Othello

1983

- Macbeth
- Much Ado About Nothing
- The Two Gentlemen of Verona

1984

- Pericles
- The Merchant of Venice
- The Taming of the Shrew

1985

- Cymbeline
- King Lear
- A Midsummer Night's Dream

1986

- As You Like It
- Hamlet
- The Tempest

1987

- Measure for Measure
- Romeo and Juliet
- Twelfth Night

1988

- All's Well That Ends Well
- The Comedy of Errors
- Richard III

1989

- Henry V
- The Merry Wives of Windsor
- She Stoops to Conquer by Oliver Goldsmith

1990

- Julius Caesar
- Much Ado About Nothing
- The Rivals by Richard Brinsley Sheridan

1991

- Antony and Cleopatra
- Othello
- The Taming of the Shrew

1992

- Macbeth
- As You Like It
- The Winter's Tale

1993

- Richard II
- Pericles
- A Midsummer Night's Dream

1994

- Romeo and Juliet
- The Two Gentlemen of Verona
- Henry IV, Part 1

1995

- Cymbeline
- Henry IV, Part 2
- The Comedy of Errors

1996

- Twelfth Night
- The Tempest
- The Triumph of Love by Pierre de Marivaux

1997

- Hamlet
- All's Well That Ends Well
- Rosencrantz and Guildenstern Are Dead by Tom Stoppard

1998

- Much Ado About Nothing
- Measure for Measure
- The Falcon's Pitch, adaptated by Jeffrey Sweet from Henry VI, Part 1; Henry VI, Part 2; and Henry VI, Part 3

1999

- The Merry Wives of Windsor
- Richard III
- Wild Oats by John O'Keefe

2000

- The Taming of the Shrew
- King John
- The Three Musketeers, adapted by Eberle Thomas and Barbara Redmond from the novel by Alexandre Dumas

2001

- Love's Labour's Lost
- Coriolanus
- Othello

2002

- Merchant of Venice
- A Midsummer Night's Dream
- Romeo and Juliet

2003

- As You Like It
- King Lear
- Knight of the Burning Pestle by Francis Beaumont and John Fletcher

2004

- Two Gentlemen of Verona
- Cyrano de Bergerac by Edmond Rostand
- Hamlet

2005

- Macbeth
- Twelfth Night
- Henry VIII

2006

- Julius Caesar
- Pericles
- The Comedy of Errors

2007

- Much Ado About Nothing
- Henry V
- Love's Labour's Lost

2008

- The Taming of the Shrew
- Titus Andronicus
- The Complete Works of William Shakespeare Abridged by Adam Long, Daniel Singer and Jess Winfield
- A Midsummer Night's Dream (Shakespeare Alive!)

2009

- A Midsummer Night's Dream
- Richard III
- Scapin, adapted by Bill Irwin and Mark O’Donnell
- The Tempest (Shakespeare Alive!)

2010

- The Tempest
- The Three Musketeers, adapted by Robert Kauzlaric from the novel by Alexandre Dumas
- The Merry Wives of Windsor
- As You Like It (Shakespeare Alive!)

2011

- The Complete Works of William Shakespeare (Abridged) by Adam Long, Daniel Singer and Jess Winfield
- The Winter's Tale
- Romeo and Juliet
- Twelfth Night (TYA)

2012

- As You Like It
- Othello
- The Rivals by Richard Brinsley Sheridan
- The Comedy of Errors (TYA)

2013

- The Comedy of Errors
- Macbeth
- Failure: A Love Story by Philip Dawkins
- The Magical Mind of Billy Shakespeare (TYA) by Kevin Rich

2014

- Much Ado About Nothing
- Antony and Cleopatra
- Elizabeth Rex by Timothy Findley

2015

- Love's Labour's Lost
- Q Gents, adapted by The Q Brothers from The Two Gentlemen of Verona
- Richard II
- Love's Labor's Won by Scott Kaiser

2016

- Hamlet
- Twelfth Night
- Peter and the Starcatcher by Rick Elice

2017

- A Midsummer Night's Dream
- Shakespeare’s Amazing Cymbeline, adapted by Chris Coleman from Cymbeline
- I Heart Juliet, adapted by The Q Brothers from Romeo and Juliet

2018

- The Merry Wives of Windsor
- Henry V
- Shakespeare in Love, adapted for the stage by Lee Hall from the screenplay by Marc Norman and Tom Stoppard

2019

- As You Like It, adapted by Robert Quinlan and Jordan Coughtry
- Pride and Prejudice, adapted by Deanna Jent from the novel by Jane Austen
- Caesar, adapted by Quetta Carpenter from Julius Caesar

2020

- Festival canceled due to the pandemic

2021

- Measure for Measure
- The Winter's Tale

2022

- Much Ado About Nothing
- The Complete Works of William Shakespeare (Abridged) by Adam Long, Daniel Singer and Jess Winfield
- King Lear

2023

- The Comedy of Errors
- The Book of Will by Lauren Gunderson
- The Tempest

2024

- Twelfth Night
- Sense and Sensibility, adapted by Quetta Carpenter from the novel by Jane Austen
- Macbeth

2025

- A Midsummer Night's Dream
- The Importance of Being Earnest, by Oscar Wilde
- Hamlet

2026

- Two Gentlemen of Verona
- Romeo and Juliet
- Our Town, by Thornton Wilder

== Artistic Directors ==
- Cal Pritner (1978-1991)
- John Sipes (1991-1995)
- Cal MacLean (1996-2006)
- Alec Wild (2007)
- Deb Alley (2008-2012)
- Kevin Rich (2013–2017)
- John C. Stark (2018-2024)
- Robert Quinlan (2025-Present)
