= Gimme the Power (2000 film) =

- Directed by: Fernando Sariñana
- Written by: Fernando Sariñana; Enrique Renteria; Carolina Rivera
- Starring: Demián Bichir; Cecilia Suárez
- Distributed by: Videocine
- Release date: 20 January 2000
- Running time: 1h 45min
- Country: Mexico
- Language: Spanish
- Box office: $6.6 million (Mexico)

Gimme the Power (Spanish: Todo el poder) is a 2000 Mexican crime film directed by Fernando Sariñana. The film follows a Mexican film director disillusioned with the crime and corruption in his homeland.

== Cast ==
- Demián Bichir - Gabriel
- Cecilia Suárez - Sofía Aguirre
- Luis Felipe Tovar - Comandante Eleuterio 'Elvis' Quijano
- Ximena Sariñana - Valentina
- Rodrigo Murray - Martín

== Reception ==
The film opened on 20 January 2000 on 320 screens in Mexico. It opened at number one at the box office in Mexico City with a gross of 7.1 million pesos ($0.7 million) in its first week from 94 screens. In its first two weeks nationwide it grossed 42 million pesos ($4.3 million). After 12 weeks it had grossed $6.6 million.
