= List of Mexican films of 2016 =

This is a list of Mexican films released in 2016.

== Box office records ==
- On May 30, ¿Qué Culpa Tiene el Niño?, starred by Karla Souza and Ricardo Abarca became the third highest-grossing film of all time in Mexico, only surpassed by No Se Aceptan Devoluciones and Nosotros Los Nobles (both 2013). The film grossed MXN$192 million in its first three weeks of release.

=== Films ===
Date	Title	Director	Cast	Genre	Notes	Ref.
January 1	El Cumple de la Abuela	Javier Colinas	Susana Alexander; Paola Núñez; Marimar Vega	Comedy		
February 12	Busco Novio Para Mi Mujer	Enrique Begne	Sandra Echeverría; Arath de la Torre; Jesús Ochoa	Comedy	Remake of the Argentine film Un Novio Para Mi Mujer (2007)	
February 26	Las Aparicio	Moisés Ortíz	Ana de la Reguera; Carmen Farías; Liz Gallardo; Iliana Fox; Tenoch Huerta Mejía; Damián Alcázar; Joaquín Cosío	Drama	Based on the TV series of the same name	
March 11	Paraíso Perdido	Humberto Hinojosa	Ana Claudia Talancón; Iván Sánchez; Andrés Almeida	Thriller		
March 31	Compadres	Enrique Begne	Omar Chaparro; Joey Morgan; Eric Roberts; Erick Elías; Aislinn Derbez	Action-comedy		
April 8	Chronic: El Ultimo Paciente	Michel Franco	Tim Roth; Sarah Sutherland; Robin Bartlett; Nailea Norvind	Drama	Premiered at the 2015 Cannes Film Festival and was selected to compete for the Palme d'Or, where it was awarded for Best Screenplay.	
April 15	Desierto	Jonás Cuarón	Gael García Bernal; Jeffrey Dean Morgan; Marco Pérez; Alondra Hidalgo	Thriller	Mexican entry for Best Foreign Language Film at the 89th Academy Awards	
April 22	Las Elegidas	David Pablos	Nancy Talamantes; Óscar Torres; Alicia Quiñonez	Drama	Ariel Award for Best Picture in 2016	
May 13	¿Qué Culpa Tiene el Niño?	Gustavo Loza	Karla Souza; Ricardo Abarca; Jesús Ochoa; Mara Escalante	Comedy		
May 19	Rumbos Paralelos	Rafael Montero	Ludwika Paleta; Iliana Fox; Michel Brown; Arturo Barba	Drama		
June 26	La Caridad	Marcelino Islas	Jaime Garza; Verónica Langer	Drama		
July 1	La Niña de la Mina	Jorge Ramírez Valera	Regina Blandón; José Ángel Bichir	Horror		
July 22	Mr. Pig	Diego Luna	Danny Glover; Maya Rudolph; José María Yazpik; Joel Murray	Drama		
August 19	Me Estás Matando Susana	Roberto Sneider	Gael García Bernal; Verónica Echegui; Ashley Hinshaw; Daniel Giménez Cacho	Comedy	Based on the novel Ciudades Desiertas by José Agustín	
August 26	Te Prometo Anarquía	Julio Hernández Cordón	Diego Calva; Eduardo Martínez	Drama	Winner of the Golden Leopard at the 2015 Locarno International Film Festival	
September 2	La Delgada Línea Amarilla	Celso García	Damián Alcázar; Joaquín Cosio; Silverio Palacios; Gustavo Sánchez Parra; Américo Hollander	Drama		
September 16	No Manches Frida	Nacho G. Velilla	Omar Chaparro; Martha Higareda; Fernanda Castillo	Comedy	Remake of the German film Fack ju Göhte (2013)	
September 19	7:19	Jorge Michel Grau	Héctor Bonilla; Demián Bichir; Verónica Langer	Drama		
October 7	Treintona, Soltera y Fantástica	Chava Cartas	Bárbara Mori; Jordi Mollà; Marimar Vega; Angélica Aragón; Juan Pablo Medina	Comedy		
October 28	La Vida Inmoral de la Pareja Ideal	Manolo Caro	Cecilia Suárez; Manuel Garcia-Rulfo; Sebastián Aguirre; Ximena Romo; Juan Pablo Medina	Comedy		
October 28	La Leyenda del Chupacabras	Alberto Rodríguez	—	Animated		
October 28	El Jeremías	Anwar Safa	Martín Castro; Karem Momo; Daniel Giménez Cacho; Isela Vega	Comedy		
November 4	Kilómetro 31 – 2	Rigoberto Castañeda	Carlos Aragón; Mauricio García Lozano; Adriá Collado; Verónica Merchant	Thriller	Sequel to the Mexican film KM31 (2006)	
November 18	Macho	Antonio Serrano	Miguel Rodarte; Aislinn Derbez; Renato López; Manolo Cardona	Comedy		
November 25	Un Monstruo de Mil Cabezas	Rodrigo Plá	Jana Raluy; Sebastián Aguirre; Emilio Echevarría; Daniel Giménez Cacho	Drama	Premiered at the 72nd Venice International Film Festival in 2015	

== See also ==
- List of 2016 box office number-one films in Mexico
