= 58th Ariel Awards =

2016 Mexican film awards

- Official poster
- Date: May 28, 2016
- Site: National Auditorium; Mexico City, Mexico

Highlights
- Best Picture: Las Elegidas
- Most awards: Las Elegidas and Gloria (5)
- Most nominations: La Delgada Línea Amarilla and Gloria (14)

Television coverage
- Network: Canal Once

The 58th Ariel Awards ceremony, organized by the Mexican Academy of Film Arts and Sciences (AMACC) took take place on May 28, 2016, at the National Auditorium in Mexico City. During the ceremony, AMACC presented the Ariel Award in 26 categories honoring films released in 2015. The ceremony, was televised in Mexico by Canal Once.

Las Elegidas, and Gloria each won five awards, with the former earning the Best Picture honor. Other winners included Mexican Gangster: La Leyenda del Charro Misterioso with four; 600 Millas, and El Hombre Que Vio Demasiado with two; and Ausencias, El Abrazo de la Serpiente, El Jeremías, Hilda, La Increíble Historia del Niño de Piedra, Un Monstruo de Mil Cabezas, Trémulo, and Zimbo with one.

== Winners and nominees ==
The nominees for the 58th Ariel Awards were announced on April 13, 2016 at the Cineteca Nacional in Mexico City, by Dolores Heredia, president of the Academy, and actors Adriana Paz and Juan Manuel Bernal, winners for Best Actress and Best Actor, respectively, at the 57th Ariel Awards. La Delgada Línea Amarilla and Gloria received the most nominations with fourteen; 600 Millas and Las Elegidas came in second with thirteen apiece. The Golden Ariel was awarded to actress Rosita Quintana and film director Paul Leduc. The ceremony was held at the National Auditorium in Mexico City for the first time, instead of its traditional venue, Palacio de Bellas Artes, in order to increase the capacity to 2,300 seats, according to Heredia.

=== Awards ===
Winners are listed first and highlighted with boldface.

**Best Picture**: **Las Elegidas – Canana and Manny Films**; 600 Millas – Lucía Films; Gloria – Pelo Suelo Mexico Films and Río Negro; La Delgada Línea Amarilla – Springall Pictures; Un Monstruo de Mil Cabezas – Buena Ventura Producciones	**Best Director**: **David Pablos – Las Elegidas**; Julio Hernández Cordón – Te Prometo Anarquía; Rodrigo Plá – Un Monstruo de Mil Cabezas; Gabriel Ripstein – 600 Millas; Anwar Safa – El Jeremías
**Best Actor**: **Marco Pérez – Gloria as Sergio Andrade**; Damián Alcázar – La Delgada Línea Amarilla as Toño; Kristyan Ferrer – 600 Millas as Arnulfo Rubio; Tenoch Huerta – Mexican Gangster: La Leyenda del Charro Misterioso as Charro Misterioso / Alfredo Ríos Galeana; Tim Roth – 600 Millas as Hank Harris	**Best Actress**: **Sofía Espinosa – Gloria as Gloria Trevi**; Geraldine Chaplin – Dólares de Arena as Anne; Flor Edwarda Gurrola – El Placer es Mío as Rita; Verónica Langer – Hilda as Mrs. Le Marchand; Jana Raluy – Un Monstruo de Mil Cabezas as Sonia Bonet
**Best Supporting Actor**: **Noé Hernández** – **600 Millas as Martín**; Joaquín Cosío – La Delgada Línea Amarilla as Gabriel; Emilio Echevarría – Un Monstruo de Mil Cabezas as Sandoval Núñez; Silverio Palacios – La Delgada Línea Amarilla as Atayde; Gustavo Sánchez Parra – La Delgada Línea Amarilla as Mario	**Best Supporting Actress**: **Adriana Paz** – **Hilda as Hilda**; Vanessa Bauche – Elvira, te daría mi vida pero la estoy usando as Luisa; Cassandra Ciangherotti – Tiempos Felices as Mónica Villalobos; Alicia Quiñonez – Las Elegidas as Inés; Isela Vega – El Jeremías as Herminia
**Breakthrough Male Performance**: **Martín Castro – El Jeremías as Jeremías**; Alejandro Guerrero – Sopladora de Hojas as Rubén; Fabrizio Santini – Sopladora de Hojas as Lucas; César R. Suárez Morales – Los Jefes as La Bomba; Óscar Torres – Las Elegidas as Ulises	**Breakthrough Female Performance**: **Nancy Talamantes – Las Elegidas as Sofía**; Yanet Mojica – Dólares de Arena as Noeli; Karen Momo – El Jeremías as Margarita; Andrea Ortega-Lee – Ella es Ramona as Ramona; Tatiana del Real – Gloria as María Raquenel Portillo
**Best Original Screenplay**: **Las Elegidas – David Pablos**; 600 Millas – Gabriel Ripstein and Issa López; Gloria – Sabina Berman; El Jeremías – Ana Sofía Clerici; La Delgada Línea Amarilla – Celso García	**Best Adapted Screenplay**: **Un Monstruo de Mil Cabezas – Lauro Santullo from her novel**; Dólares de Arena – Israel Cárdenas and Laura Amelia Guzmán from the novel Les Dollars des Sables by Jean-Noël Pancrazi; La Extinción de los Dinosaurios – Luis Ayhllón from his play; Hilda – Andrés Clariound Rangel from the play Hilda by Marie NDiaye; Yo – Matías Meyer and Alexandre Auger from the short story Histoire du pied et autres fantaisies by J. M. G. Le Clézio
**Best Ibero-American Film**: **El Abrazo de la Serpiente (Colombia) – Ciro Guerra**; El Clan (Argentina) – Pablo Trapero; El Club (Chile) – Pablo Larraín; O Lobo Atrás da Porta (Brazil) – Fernando Coimbra; Truman (Spain) – Cesc Gay	**Best First Feature Film**: **600 Millas – Gabriel Ripstein**; El Jeremías – Anwar Safa; Gloria – Christian Keller; Hilda – Andrés Clariond Rangel; La Delgada Línea Amarilla – Celso García
**Best Documentary Feature**: **El Hombre Que Vio Demasiado – Trisha Ziff**; El Paso – Everardo González; Los Reyes del Pueblo Que No Existe – Betzabé García; Made in Bangkok – Flavio Florencio; Tiempo Suspendido – Natalia Bruschtein	**Best Documentary Short Subject**: **Ausencias – Tatiana Huezo**; El Buzo – Esteban Arrangoiz; Muchacho en la barra se masturba con rabia y osadía – Julián Hernández; Por los Caminos del Sur – Jorge Luis Linares; Tobías – Francisca D'Acosta
**Best Animated Feature Film**: **La Increíble Historia del Niño de Piedra – Miguel Ángel Uriegas, Miguel Bonilla, Jaime Romandía and Pablo Aldrete**; El Americano: The Movie – Ricardo Arnaiz and Mike Kunkel; Un Gallo con Muchos Huevos – Gabriel Riva Palacio and Rodolfo Riva Palacio	**Best Animated Short**: **Zimbo – Juan José Medina and Rita Basulto**; Conejo en la Luna – Melissa Ballesteros; El último jaguar – Miguel Anaya; Los Ases del Corral – Irving Sevilla; Tictactópolis – José Sierra
**Best Original Score**: **El Hombre Que Vio Demasiado – Jacobo Lieberman**; Gloria – Lorne Balfe; La Delgada Línea Amarilla – Daniel Guillermo Zlotnik; Las Elegidas – Carlo Ayhllón; Mexican Gangster: La Leyenda del Charro Misterioso – Andrés Sánchez Maher	**Best Live Action Short**: **Trémulo – Roberto Fiesco**; 3 Variaciones de Ofelia – Paulo César Riqué; 24° 51’ Latitud Norte – Carlos Lenin; Esclava – Amat Escalante; La Teta de Botero – Humberto Busto; Malva – Lucero Sánchez
**Best Sound**: **Gloria – Matías Barberis, Jaime Baksht and Michelle Couttolenc**; 600 Millas – Alejandro de Icaza and Federico González Jordán; La Delgada Línea Amarilla – Sergio Díaz, Jaime Baksht and Gabriel Coll; Las Elegidas – Alejandro de Icaza and Pablo Tamez; Un Monstruo de Mil Cabezas – Alejandro de Icaza and Axel Muñoz	**Best Film Editing**: **Gloria – Adriana Martínez and Patricia Rommel**; 600 Millas – Gabriel Ripstein and Santiago Pérez Rocha; La Delgada Línea Amarilla – Jorge Arturo García; Las Elegidas – Miguel Schverdfinger and Aina Calleja; Un Monstruo de Mil Cabezas – Miguel Schverdfinger
**Best Art Direction**: **Mexican Gangster: La Leyenda del Charro Misterioso – Bárbara Enríquez and Alejandro García**; 600 Millas – Carlos Jacques; El Jeremías – Bárbara Enríquez; Gloria – Julieta Álvarez; Las Elegidas – Daniela Schneider	**Best Cinematography**: **Las Elegidas – Carolina Costa**; Gloria – Martin Boege; La Delgada Línea Amarilla – Emiliano Villanueva; Mexican Gangster: La Leyenda del Charro Misterioso – Tonatiuh Martínez; Te Prometo Anarquía – María José Secco
**Best Makeup**: **Gloria – David Gameros**; 600 Millas – Thal Echeveste; El Jeremías – Nayeli Mora; Las Elegidas – Adam Zoller; Mexican Gangster: La Leyenda del Charro Misterioso – Marco Antonio Hernández	**Best Costume Design**: **Mexican Gangster: La Leyenda del Charro Misterioso – Gilda Navarro**; Gloria – Gilda Navarro; Hilda – Mónica Neumaier; La Delgada Línea Amarilla – Gabriela Fernández; Las Elegidas – Daniela Schneider
**Best Special Effects**: **Mexican Gangster: La Leyenda del Charro Misterioso – Alejandro Vázquez**; 600 Millas – Alejandro Vázquez; Alicia en el País de María – Ricardo Arvizu; Familia Gang – José Ángel Cordero; La Delgada Línea Amarilla – Alejandro Vázquez	**Best Visual Effects**: **Mexican Gangster: La Leyenda del Charro Misterioso – Charlie Iturriaga and Natalia de la Garza**; 600 Millas – Edgardo Mejía; El Jeremías – Raúl Prado, Edgar Piña and Juan Carlos Lepe; Gloria – Raúl Prado, Edgar Piña and Juan Carlos Lepe; La Delgada Línea Amarilla – Miguel de Hoyos, Ricardo Villarreal and Marco Rodríguez

=== Golden Ariel ===
- Rosita Quintana
- Paul Leduc

== Multiple nominations and awards ==
The following twelve films received multiple nominations:

Nominations	Film
14	Gloria
14	La Delgada Línea Amarilla
13	600 Millas
13	Las Elegidas
9	El Jeremías
8	Mexican Gangster: La Leyenda del Charro Misterioso
7	Un Monstruo de Mil Cabezas
5	Hilda
3	Dólares de Arena
2	El Hombre Que Vio Demasiado
2	Sopladora de Hojas
2	Te Prometo Anarquía

Films that received multiple awards:

Awards	Film
5	Gloria
5	Las Elegidas
4	Mexican Gangster: La Leyenda del Charro Misterioso
2	600 Millas
2	El Hombre Que Vio Demasiado

== Ceremony information ==
The Mexican Academy of Film Arts and Sciences (AMACC) registered 152 films to compete for the Ariel Awards of 2016 in 26 categories, an increase of 11% from 2015. The films comprised were 71 feature films (including twelve documentaries and nine animated films) and 13 films for the Best Iberoamerican Feature Film. For the Best Picture award, 41 films were considered, as they meet the requirement of having commercial exhibition in cinemas in Mexico or been exhibited at international film festivals in 2015. The AMACC created a committee of 189 people, who were active members and previous Ariel Award nominees and winners to vote for the 2015 nominees. To promote the award ceremony, a photo exhibition showing the actresses awarded the Ariel for Best Lead Actress was inaugurated on May 2, 2016 at the gates of the Bosque de Chapultepec. An official tour titled "Rumbo al Ariel" showed the nominated films on movie theaters in Mexico City, including the Cineteca Nacional, Cinemanía Loreto and Cine Tonalá, among others. Three nominated films have had a successful runs on international film festivals. Las Elegidas was included in the selection for the Un Certain Regard at the 68th Cannes Film Festival. 600 Millas was awarded the Best First Feature Award at the 65th Berlin International Film Festival and was selected to represent Mexico for the 88th Academy Awards; the box office performance in the country was "discreet", according to newspaper El País with 92,000 attendees. La Delgada Línea Amarilla was named Best Iberoamerican Film and the Bronze Zenith Award for The Best First Fiction Feature Film at the Montreal World Film Festival. Meanwhile, Gloria, a biopic about Mexican singer-songwriter Gloria Trevi, was premiered in 2014, but formalities presented by the Mexican Academy prevented it to be postulated that year.

=== Box office performance of nominees ===
At the time of the nominations announcement on April 13, the highest earner among the nominated films was Un Gallo con Muchos Huevos with MXN$167.8 million in domestic box office receipts, and also was the highest-grossing film of 2015 in Mexico. Only one Best Picture nominee ranked at the top ten, Gloria, at number five with MXN$34.9 million. At number seven, Elvira, te daría mi vida pero la estoy usando, with earnings of MXN$23.0 million, was nominated for Best Supporting Actress. As for the rest of the Best Picture nominated films, Las Elegidas had its commercial release in theaters in Mexico on April 22 and was made available for streaming via Netflix on May 8. 600 Millas earned MXN$4.4 million in Mexico.
