= Noé Hernández (actor) =

Mexican actor

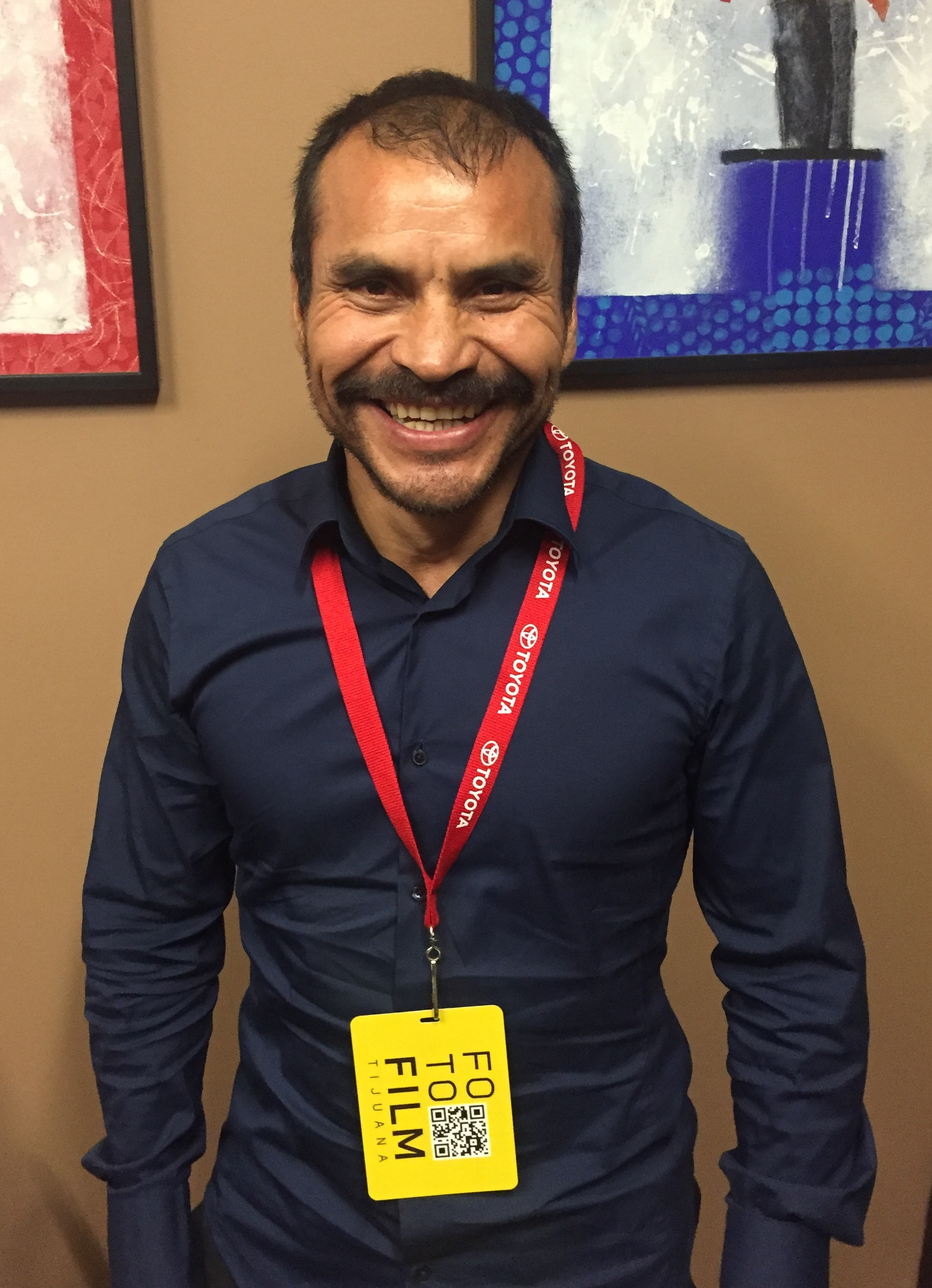
- Noé Hernández at the presentation of the film La Habitación (2016) during the FotoFilm Tijuana Festival held on July 15, 2017.
- Born: Noé Hernández Álvarez; November 10, 1969 (age 56); Atitalaquía, Hidalgo, Mexico
- Education: Universidad Autónoma del Estado de México
- Occupation: Actor
- Years active: 2007–present
- Children: 1

Noé Hernández Álvarez (born November 10, 1969) is a Mexican actor. Following his studies of Dramatic Arts at the Autonomous University of the State of Mexico, he became a high school teacher and founded an experimental theater group. After relocating to Mexico City he was offered little roles on several films, including Propiedad Ajena and Sin Nombre. His first lead role was Lino Valdez in Miss Bala, gaining popular recognition and earning a nomination for an Ariel Award for Best Actor.

Hernández was praised for his role of Canelita in the film La Tirisia (2014) and won the Ariel Award for Best Supporting Actor. He was also featured in the TV series Crónica de Castas and La Hermandad. For his performance in the film Mexican Gangster: La Leyenda del Charro Misterioso he received a Diosa de Plata nomination for Best Supporting Actor. He received further recognition for playing gang leader Martín in the Mexican film 600 Millas, for which he won a second Ariel Award for Best Supporting Actor in 2016. For his leading role in the film Ocho de Cada Diez, Hernández received the Ariel Award for Best Actor.

== Background ==
Noé Hernández Álvarez was born in November 10, 1969 in Atitalaquía, Hidalgo, Mexico, to peasant parents. He studied Dramatic Arts at the Autonomous University of the State of Mexico State. He was about to enroll to be a lawyer, but changed his mind at the last minute after browsing the school brochure, since he used to perform in theater production while in high school. After graduating in 1994, he became a high school teacher for seven years in Toluca and at the same time founded an experimental theater group, later he relocated to Mexico City since he wanted to act in movies.

== Film career ==
=== Early career and first lead role in Miss Bala ===
Hernández spent three years attending three or four casting calls every week, until he was signed to do a commercial and then a small role in the film Propiedad Ajena in 2007. The next year, he had his first supporting role in the film Espiral (2008) and then a 40-second role in the film Sin Nombre, directed by Cary Fukunaga. About Resistol, his role in Sin Nombre, the actor said: "he's a drug addict who inhales glue, they actually thought that I was a real vagabond who had been found there". Supporting roles in the films Vaho (2010), Somos Lo Que Hay (2010), and El Infierno (2010), followed.

During the filming of Sin Nombre, Hernández met filmmaker Gerardo Naranjo, who years later offered him the lead role in Miss Bala. Written by Naranjo and Mauricio Katz, the film, about a beauty pageant contestant, played by Stephanie Sigman, who witnesses a murder and after that is kidnapped by a gang leader named Lino Valdez (Hernández) who uses her for criminal purposes. From their first meeting, even during the casting process, Sigman and Hernández had great chemistry on camera, as stated by the actor to Gatopardo magazine: "between us there was something... Stephanie was always cast along handsome guys and then I came with this face. I think that immediately we got into the role each of us had to play". Naranjo wanted the actors to react to the situation, instead of learning the screenplay word-by-word. The process was hard for Hernández, since he wanted to analyse the psychology of his character and get away from the narco stereotypes creating Valdez with "no crucifixes, or gold chains, or guns". The film was selected to represent Mexico in the category for Best Foreign Language Film at the 84th Academy Awards and received three nominations for the 54th Ariel Awards, for Best Picture, Best Director (Naranjo), and Best Actor for Hernández.

=== Second lead role in Chalán and the award-winning role in La Tirisia ===
In 2012, Hernández joined the cast of Colosio: El Asesinato, and the TV film Chalán, produced by Canal 22 and directed by Jorge Michel Grau. In Chalán, he played Alan, a driver and assistant to a federal deputy, and this role was his opportunity to play a different role from the villains of previous films, as he told El Informador: "I try to take care of my career, not being involved in any given project, and when I got this role, I really liked it. It is a completely different character to what I was doing before, as in Miss Bala or El Infierno. Those are the challenges that I like, those who do not pigeonhole you, allowing you to put a spin on your work. Characters that are alive and well built".

Hernández signed to play Canelita, the gay best friend of Cheba (Adriana Paz) in La Tirisia, a film written, produced and directed by Jorge Pérez Solano (2014). The plot, inspired by a popular term named tirisia (which means "a perpetual sadness defined as 'the death of the spirit'"), is set in the Mixteca region of Mexico, and centers on two women (Paz and Gabriela Cartol) who were impregnated by Sylvestre (Gustavo Sánchez Parra). When Cheba's estranged husband returns to town, he finds her sunk into a deep depression since she had to give away a newborn (Sylvestre's child). Hernández was hesitant to take the role and the preparation was not easy for the director either, as he further explained to Cine Toma magazine: "I was pleased that an actor like Noé Hernández, who suddenly was falling into the stereotype of the tough, strong, bully, bad Indian man, agreed to play this role. It took some work from both of us at first. For me, to accept him physically and for him to accept the character and built it, but I think it was an experiment that tourned out pretty well". Hernández said to El Universal: "the director told me: you wanted an acting challenge and acting to stop doing the same violent roles, this is it, take it". The film was not exhibited on commercial movie theaters in Mexico since the distribution was expensive; instead, La Tirisia was screened at film festivals such as the Chicago International Film Festival, Thessaloniki International Film Festival and Toulouse Latin American Film Festival, and later had a month-and-a-half exhibition at the Mexican art house Cineteca Nacional. Hernández received critical praise for his performance. Jaime López Blanco of Sputnik magazine found him "exquisite as 'Canelita', as it demonstrates his charm and his comedic talents, showing a totally opposite of his previous work, Miss Bala". At the Ariel Awards of 2015, Hernández received the Best Supporting Actor accolade for the role in the film. After winning the award the actor struggled to find new roles, considered retiring from acting and return to his hometown to work in the country fields, explaining to El Informador: "Of course I'm delighted, who does not like to win awards? The awards are ego boosters, but what I really want is that they can be transformed into stronger work opportunities and complex characters, good roles, and lead roles. This year I only had five-day calls for little characters; the award has not really helped me a lot, let's hope it strengthens my career and leads to more opportunities". At the time, a project with director Nacho Ortíz fell through, and four other films co-starred by Hernández were not distributed in Mexico. "Fortunately I'm not married, I have a son who I help moderately and every month I try to survive. Sometimes I say, 'I have income to pay rent for three months I can hold on a little', but then I start to worry and say 'time is running out and what can I do'. This situation has been quite difficult for me," the actor told El Universal.

=== 600 Millas and second Ariel Award ===
Two films featuring Hernández premiered in 2015, including Hilda and Mexican Gangster: La Leyenda del Charro Misterioso, and the actor was nominated for a Diosa de Plata for Best Supporting Actor for the latter film. The same year, Hernández joined filmmaker Gabriel Ripstein on his directorial debut with 600 Millas, produced by Ripstein and Mexican director Michel Franco. The screenplay, by Ripstein and Issa López, was inspired by the ATF gunwalking scandal. In the film, weapons smuggler Arnulfo Rubio (Kristyan Ferrer) works for a Mexican cartel led by his uncle Martín (Hernández). ATF agent Hank Harris (Tim Roth), who tries to arrest him, is kidnapped by Rubio to bring to his bosses; during the 600-mile (970 km) drive, they became friends. 600 Millas premiered in the Panorama Section of the 65th Berlin International Film Festival, opened in 150 screens in Mexico on December 4, 2015, and was selected to represent the country at the 88th Academy Awards in the Best Foreign Language Film category. Coincidentally, La Tirisia, Hernández's previous film, was selected to represent the country for the Goya Award for Best Spanish Language Foreign Film in Spain. In 2016, 600 Miles received 13 nominations for the 58th Ariel Awards, and Hernández won his second consecutive award for Best Supporting Actor.

=== TV roles and Los Inquilinos ===
Following his tenure in the first season of the TV series Crónica de Castas, Hernández agreed to be the villain in La Hermandad, a series developed by Claro Video, directed by Carlos Bolado and co-starred by Colombian actor Manolo Cardona and Spanish actress Paz Vega. About his role (Pedro Castro — a police chief), the actor told to the Associated Press: "He is a very particular villain. He does not like to see people suffer, so instead of torturing them, he kills them fast". The actor also filmed in Guadalajara, Inquilinos, playing a janitor in a multifamily complex where a series of supernatural events occur. The film also features Mexican actors Erick Elías and Danny Perea. About his role and the thriller genre, Hernández stated, "It is a genre that is not very common in Mexico and from the little I have seen it falls into clichés, laughter effects, and creating little monsters. What attracted me to this film was the script; is a psychological thriller that takes you down to ground level: circumstances that can happen everyday, but that also have a thriller vibe". In 2018, Hernández joined several actors in the music video for "Banana Papaya", a song performed by Kany García and Residente.

== Filmography ==
=== Film ===
Year	Title	Role	Notes	Ref.
2007	Propiedad Ajena	Capataz		
2008	Espiral	Macario		
2009	Sin Nombre	Resistol		
2009	Tres Piezas de Amor en un Fin de Semana	Roberto		
2009	Vaho	El Monstruo Indalecio		
2010	Somos Lo Que Hay	—		
2010	El Infierno	El Sardo		
2010	El Baile de San Juan	Juvenal		
2011	Miss Bala	Lino Valdez	Nominated – Ariel Award for Best Actor	
2012	Colosio: El Asesinato	Rigo		
2012	Chalán	Alan		
2012	En el Ombligo del Cielo	Gualberto		
2013	Cinco de Mayo: La Batalla	Benito Juárez		
2013	Acción en Movimiento	—		
2014	César Chávez	Juan de la Cruz		
2014	La Tirisia	Canelita	Ariel Award for Best Supporting Actor	
2014	La Dictadura Perfecta	Jefe de Seguridad		
2014	Plan Sexenal	Reynoso		
2014	Hilda	Obispo		
2014	Mexican Gangster: La Leyenda del Charro Misterioso	—	Nominated – Diosa de Plata for Best Supporting Actor	
2015	600 Millas	Martín	Ariel Award for Best Supporting Actor	
2015	Un Monstruo de Mil Cabezas	Doorman		
2016	We Are the Flesh	Mariano	Nominated – Ariel Award for Best Actor	
2016	Los Inquilinos	Marcelino		
2016	La Habitación	Valentín	Segment: "Evocación"	
2016	Hysteria	Ramiro		
2016	Mis Demonios Nunca Juraron Soledad	Cabo		
2017	Opus Zero	Priest		
2018	Traición	Capitán		
2018	Bel Canto	Comandante Alfredo		
2018	Inquilinos	Marcelino		
2018	Arcángel	Arcángel	Short film	
2018	Ocho de Cada Diez	Aurelio	Mezcal Award for Best Actor; Ariel Award for Best Actor	
2018	Knife+Heart	Luis		
2019	Historia de Una Eva y Dos Ocasos	Mensajero	Short film	
2019	Hierba Mala	Tanilo	Short film	
2019	Un Canción para María	Saúl	Short film	
2020	Tijuana Bible	Topo		
2020	Kokoloko	Mundo	Ariel Award for Best Actor; Tribeca Festival – Best Actor in an International Narrative Feature Film	
2020	Hijo de Monarcas	Simón		
2020	Nudo Mixteco	Esteban	Nominated – Ariel Award for Best Actor	
2021	Finlandia	Delirio		
2022	Bardo, False Chronicle of a Handful of Truths	El Ajolote		
2022	Daughter of Rage	Raúl		
2024	Dead Man's Switch	Carlos López		
2024	Párvulos: Children of the Apocalypse	Enoc		
2024	Pedro Páramo	Abundio		
2026	Facing El Chapo	Rosales		

=== Television ===
Year	Title	Role	Notes	Ref.
2010	Capadocia	Roland	Season 2	
2011	Fronteras	—		
2014	Crónica de Castas	Miguel	2 episodes	
2016	La Hermandad	Pedro Castro	Season 1	
2019	ZeroZeroZero	Varas	Season 1	
2020	Narcos: Mexico	Rafael Aguilar Guajardo	Seasons 2 and 3	
2022	La Reina del Sur	General Carlos Garrido	Season 3	
