= Gloria (2014 film) =

2014 film

- Mexican theatrical release poster
- Directed by: Christian Keller
- Screenplay by: Sabina Berman
- Produced by: Matthias Ehrenberg; Ricardo Kleinbaum; Barrie Osborne; Alan B. Curtiss; Christian Keller
- Starring: Sofía Espinosa; Marco Pérez; Tatiana del Real; Ximena Romo
- Edited by: Adriana Martínez; Patricia Rommel
- Music by: Lorne Balfe
- Production companies: Pelo Suelto México Films; Rio Negro Productions
- Distributed by: Universal Pictures
- Release dates: 20 October 2014 (FICM); 1 January 2015 (Mexico)
- Running time: 126 minutes
- Country: Mexico
- Language: Spanish

Gloria is a 2014 Mexican drama film directed by Christian Keller, based on the life of Mexican pop singer Gloria Trevi. It was one of fourteen films shortlisted by Mexico to be their submission for the Academy Award for Best Foreign Language Film at the 88th Academy Awards, but it lost out to 600 Miles.

== Plot ==
The film chronicles the life of one of Latin America's biggest pop icons, Gloria Trevi. The film opens with Gloria at an audition for the popular music composer, Sergio Andrade. She impresses Andrade and earns a spot as a member of the Mexican pop group Boquitas Pintadas. The group fails to achieve much fame, but Sergio notices Gloria's potential as a solo artist, and grooms her as such from then on. Gloria quickly becomes a huge success all over Latin America, but her career comes to a screeching halt when she is found in the middle of a controversial sex scandal.

== Cast ==
- Sofía Espinosa as Gloria Trevi
- Marco Pérez as Sergio Andrade
- Tatiana del Real as María Raquenel
- Ximena Romo as Aline Hernández
- Osvaldo Ríos as El Tigre
- Ricardo Kleinbaum as Abogado
- Moises Arizmendi as Fernando Esquina
- Magali Boysselle as Mónica Ga
- Estefanía Villarreal as Laura
- Paula Serrano as Reportera Española

== Awards and nominations ==
=== Ariel Awards ===
The Ariel Awards are awarded annually by the Mexican Academy of Film Arts and Sciences in Mexico. Gloria won five awards out of 14 nominations.

| Year | Nominee / work | Award | Result |
|---|---|---|---|
| 2016 | Gloria | Best Picture | Nominated |
| 2016 | Christian Keller | Best First Feature Film | Nominated |
| 2016 | Sofía Espinosa | Best Actress | Won |
| 2016 | Marco Pérez | Best Actor | Won |
| 2016 | Tatiana del Real | Breakthrough Female Performance | Nominated |
| 2016 | Sabina Berman | Best Original Screenplay | Nominated |
| 2016 | Julieta Álvarez | Best Art Direction | Nominated |
| 2016 | Adriana Martínez, Patricia Rommel | Best Film Editing | Won |
| 2016 | Raúl Prado, Edgar Piña, Juan Carlos Lepe | Best Visual Effects | Nominated |
| 2016 | Martín Boege | Best Cinematography | Nominated |
| 2016 | Lorne Balfe | Best Original Music | Nominated |
| 2016 | Matías Barberis, Jaime Baksht, Michelle Couttolenc | Best Sound | Won |
| 2016 | David Gameros | Best Make-Up | Won |
| 2016 | Gilda Navarro | Best Costume Design | Nominated |
