= Sofía Espinosa =

Mexican actress, producer, writer (born 1989)

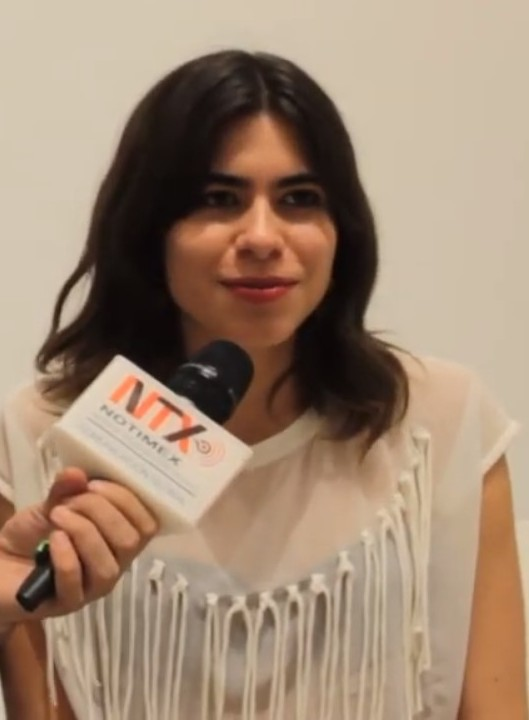
- Espinosa in 2017
- Born: Sofía Espinosa Carrasco; September 22, 1989 (age 36); Mexico City, Mexico
- Occupations: Actress, writer, producer, director
- Years active: 2004–present

Sofía Espinosa Carrasco (born September 22, 1989) is a Mexican actress, writer and director. She began her artistic preparation at the National Conservatory of Music, and followed with studies at Casazul in Mexico, Claudio Tolcachir's school in Argentina, the Stella Adler Studio in New York City, and the Royal Academy of Dramatic Art in London. She received recognition for her role of Mati in the Mexican film La Niña en la Piedra (Nadie Te Ve) (2006), for which she was nominated for an Ariel Award for Best Actress. She subsequently starred in the TV series Capadocia (2010) and Bienvenida Realidad (2011).

Espinosa is also featured in several other films including Sea of Dreams (2006), La Vida Inmune (2006), El Brassier de Emma (2007), The Kid: Chamaco (2009), I Miss You (2010), Vete Más Lejos, Alicia (2010), and Asteroide (2014). She also co-produced, co-wrote and starred in Los Bañistas (2014). For her lead performance in the biopic Gloria, based on the life of Mexican singer-songwriter Gloria Trevi, she received the Diosa de Plata and the Ariel Award for Best Actress.

== Background ==
Espinosa was born on September 22, 1989, in Mexico City, to Mario Espinosa, a theatre director, and Gloria Carrasco Altamirano, an art director. Espinosa has a younger brother named Sebastián, and is the niece of Diódoro Carrasco Altamirano, a former Governor of Oaxaca and Secretariat of the Interior. At age 4, she joined the National Conservatory of Music, and at age 13 she enrolled in Casazul, a Mexican drama school, both in Mexico City; while in Casazul, she performed in the chamber theatre version of the play Romeo and Juliet. She continued her studies at the Claudio Tolcachir school in Argentina, the Stella Adler Studio in New York City, and the Royal Academy of Dramatic Art in London. In 2011, she earned a scholarship by the National Fund for Culture and Arts (FONCA) for upcoming performers.

== Career ==
=== Early career and first lead role ===
Espinosa appeared in the short film Cuidado con el Tren, written and directed by Ignacio Ortiz in 2004, and in the films Sea of Dreams and La Vida Inmune, in 2006. At age 15, after six months in a workshop with Maryse Systach and Clarissa Malheiros, Espinosa starred in her first lead role in La Niña en la Piedra (Nadie Te Ve), which was co-directed by Systach and José Buil and is the last chapter of the trilogy about teenagers in Mexico that started with Perfume de Violetas (Nadie Te Oye) (2001) and Manos Libres (Nadie Te Escucha) (2003). Espinosa was nominated for the Ariel Award for Best Actress for her work in the film. Espinosa and Systach re-teamed for the film El Brassier de Emma.

In 2006, Espinosa performed in the short film Ver Llover by Elisa Miller, which was screened at the 2007 Cannes Film Festival and won the Short Film Palme d'Or. Miller and Espinosa worked together again five years later in the film Vete Más Lejos, Alicia (2011). She was also featured in Capadocia playing the character Paty, and also joined the cast of the telenovela Bienvenida Realidad, produced by Epigmenio Ibarra for Cadenatres in 2011, in which she played Vanessa, a lesbian teenager.

=== Breakthrough role with Gloria ===
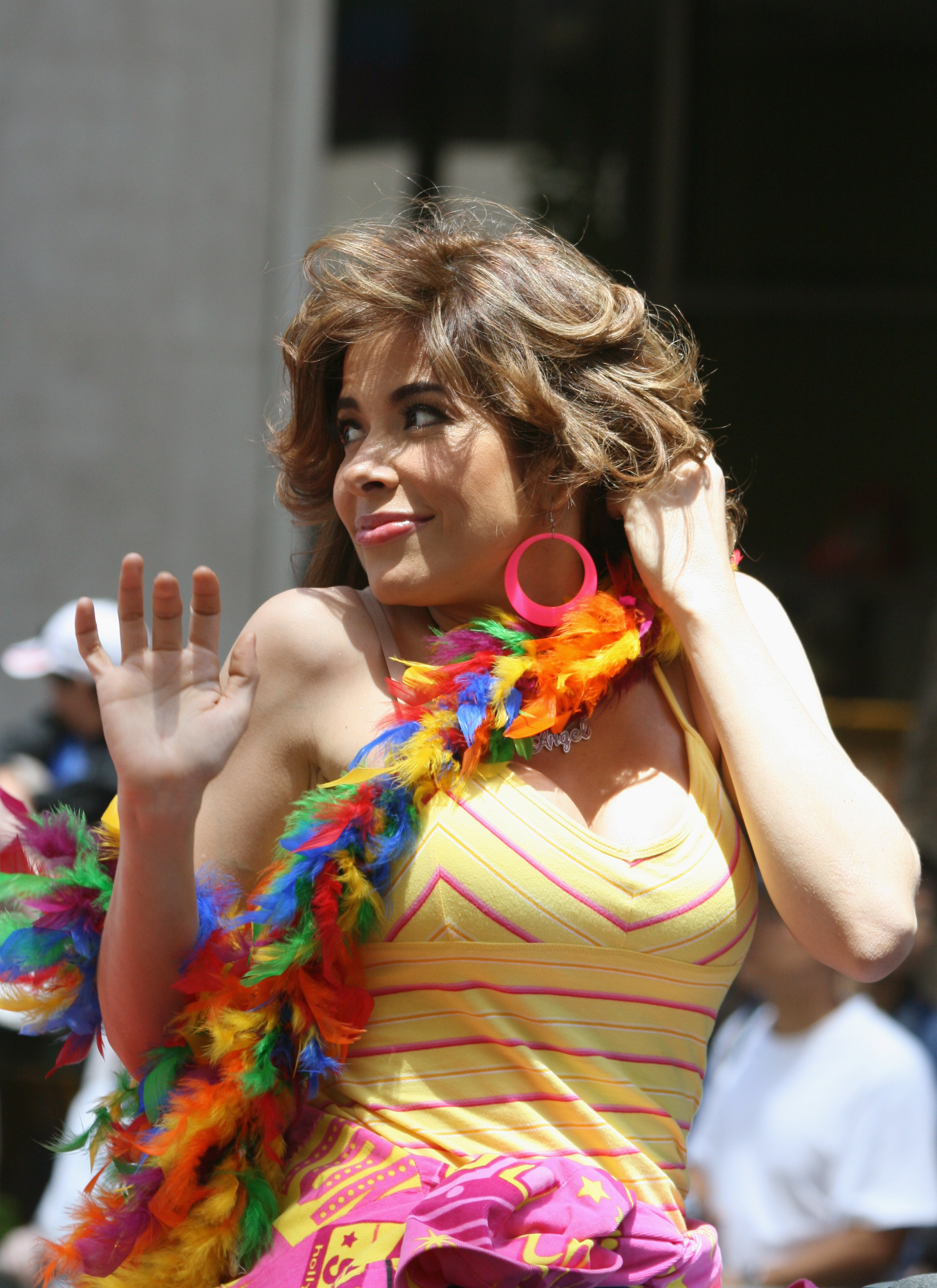
Espinosa played Mexican singer-songwriter Gloria Trevi (pictured) in the film Gloria.

Espinosa landed the lead role of the film Gloria in 2014. The film is a biopic about singer-songwriter Gloria Trevi, and her relation with her manager, record producer Sergio Andrade. The movie chronicles the rise and fall of the singer's career, detailing Trevi's first encounter with Andrade (who became her mentor), her brief tenure in a band, her rise to musical stardom, a sex scandal involving minors, and her imprisonment in Brazil. Espinosa won the role after a month-and-a-half casting process, stating that "I do not know how many actresses were [on the castings], or who they were, but once I got the role I knew it was a big responsibility, because it is a character who is alive and has a lot of fans, I had to do it well. It is a very complex character, full of nuances, with great force". Espinosa took singing lessons and had to learn Trevi's accent. Also, to fully prepare for the role, the actress was assigned a choreographer and worked with the film director to find the right tone for the scenes. Espinosa watched Trevi's interviews, concerts and films to be able to play her. "The role was meant for me", Espinosa said to Noticine.

Marco Pérez (who plays Andrade in the film) referred to Espinosa's performance as "a fascinating freshness", praising her musical training for the role and her attention to detail, further detailing that "it would have been easy to create a sensationalized, one-dimensional portrait of Gloria, but Sofía goes behind the public persona to the heart of the woman". The film premiered in Mexico on January 1, 2015, as it was distributed by Universal Pictures with about 1,000 copies. Espinosa and Pérez received positive reviews for their performances from Jessica Oliva of Cine Premiere magazine, who stated that the actors "seem to blend in with their characters. Sofía Espinosa stands out with her voice (singing all the songs), and her physical interpretation and charisma, while Marco Pérez, Sergio Andrade, manages to embody the duality of that genius of the industry, perverse and visionary at the same time". Sofía Ochoa Rodríguez and Verónica Sánchez of En Filme were "surprised by [Espinosa's] performance" as it was "very close to Gloria Trevi's, albeit with a nasally accent, and cadence which lets through the hoarse, sarcastic and melancholic style that permeates on every one of the songs the actress sings. Her acting work and physical resemblance let her move naturally from comedy to pain, loneliness to longing, to the easy smile, to the dance, to the jumps on stage and the twinkle in her eyes". In contrast, David Noh of Film Journal International was not impressed by Espinosa's acting, saying that she "lacks appeal and is quite ordinary in a role that calls for some of the electricity the very young Jennifer Lopez managed to ratchet up in her musical biopic, Selena". Gloria Trevi praised the work of Espinosa in the film, stating that "it is shocking to see yourself on film, the girl [Espinosa] did an extraordinary job". Espinosa won the Diosa de Plata and the Ariel Award for Best Actress for Gloria.

=== 2015 to 2017 ===
In 2015, she played Graciela Arias in the film Los Crímenes de Mar del Norte, based on the true story of Goyo Cárdenas, the strangler of Tacuba. The following year, Espinosa played Mexican singer Lola Beltrán on Hasta Que Te Conocí, based on the life of Mexican artist Juan Gabriel, for which she had to perform the track "Cucurrucucú Paloma", Beltrán's signature song. Espinosa co-produced, co-wrote, and starred in Los Bañistas, a film that had a limited release in Mexico (10 copies) in 2016. In the film, directed by Max Zunino, she plays Flavia, a young protester who gets involved with an older man, Juan Carlos Colombo. Espinosa's performance was met with positive reviews, such as the one written by Luis Fernando Galván of En Filme, stating that the actress "effectively embodies the hope for social renewal from a convincing performance where she goes on a trip into a social space with the intention of finding her place in the world and helping others to do the same". Espinosa and Zunino re-teamed for Bruma, in which the actress plays Martina, and according to John Hopewell of Variety, "follows a young woman (Espinosa) from Mexico's stifling upper middle-classes who, pregnant, escapes to Berlin and finds a kind of father figure and freedom in a Berlin club drag queen chanteuse and a final sense of her individual identity". The film was written by Espinosa and Zunino and won five awards at the 10th Works in Progress Guadalajara Festival. In 2016, it was announced by Variety magazine that Espinosa would join Mexican actors Demián Bichir and Diego Luna in the film The Black Minutes; in the same year, Espinosa played Rocío in the TV series Las Trece Esposas, produced by Blim and inspired by One Thousand and One Nights. Espinosa also had a voice role in the American animated film Kubo and the Two Strings (2016) and a role in La Gran Promesa, directed by Jorge Ramirez Suárez. Espinosa voiced the role of Miguel's mother in the animated film Coco (2017).

=== Theater work ===
Espinosa funded with fellow actors Belén Aguilar, Fernanda Echevarría and Armando Espitia the theater company Conejo Sin Prisa and debuted an adaptation of Paula Vogel's play How I Learned to Drive on May 15, 2017, at the Centro Cultural del Bosque (es) in Mexico City. Espinosa was joined in the cast by Belén Aguilar, Fernanda Echevarría, and Armando Espitia. Later that year, Espinosa was cast as Ana in the play Después del Ensayo, an adaptation of Ingmar Bergman's film After the Rehearsal. The play was directed by her father, Mario Espinosa, and also featured actors Juan Carlos Colombo and Julieta Egurrola.

== Filmography ==
=== Film ===
Year	Title	Role	Notes	Ref.
2006	Sea of Dreams	Girl in market		
2006	La Vida Inmune	Lidia		
2006	Ver Llover	Sofía	Short film	
2006	La Niña en la Piedra (Nadie Te Ve)	Mati	Nominated – Ariel Award for Best Actress	
2007	El Brassier de Emma	Emma		
2009	The Kid: Chamaco	Paulina		
2010	I Miss You	Alejandra		
2010	Vete Más Lejos, Alicia	Alicia		
2014	Asteroide	Elda Careaga		
2014	Los Bañistas	Flavia		
2014	Gloria	Gloria Trevi	Ariel Award for Best Actress; Diosa de Plata for Best Actress	
2016	Bruma	Martina		
2016	La Habitación	Clara		
2017	Los Crímenes de Mar del Norte			
2017	La Gran Promesa			
2017	Coco	Mamá Luisa Rivera	Voice role	
2021	The Black Minutes	"La Chilanga"		

=== Television ===
Year	Title	Role	Notes	Ref.
2008	Capadocia	Paty		
2011	Bienvenida Realidad	Vanessa Torres		
2016	Hasta Que Te Conocí	Lola Beltrán		
2022	Supertitlán	Amelia "Amy"		
