= Emilio Echevarría =

Mexican actor (1944–2025)

- Born: Emilio Antonio Echevarría Noriega; 3 July 1944; Mexico City, Mexico
- Died: 4 January 2025 (aged 80); Mexico City, Mexico
- Education: National Autonomous University of Mexico
- Occupation: Actor
- Years active: 1978–2024

Emilio Antonio Echevarría Noriega (3 July 1944 – 4 January 2025) was a Mexican actor.

== Life and career ==
Echevarría began his acting career in 1978 as a member of the Constitution of Art and Society. He appeared in Amores perros as the hitman and ex-guerrilla nicknamed "El Chivo" (The Goat), and Y tu mamá también, which also co-starred Gael García Bernal. He has also had small parts in two international productions, first as Raoul, a Cuban agent in the James Bond film Die Another Day and then as Antonio López de Santa Anna in The Alamo.

In 2007, he appeared in El búfalo de la noche along with Y tu mamá tambien co-star Diego Luna, written by Amores perros author Guillermo Arriaga. In 2011, he played Sabio in a Mexican adaptation of Gabriel García Márquez's novella Memories of My Melancholy Whores. The film was directed by Henning Carlsen and also stars Geraldine Chaplin and Ángela Molina.

Echevarría died on 4 January 2025, at the age of 80.

== Filmography ==
Year	Title	Role	Notes
1987	Un día crucial para Ausencio Paredes		
1989	Intimidad		
1990	Morir en el golfo	Contacto	
1991	Intimidades de un cuarto de baño	Juan	
1991	Los pasos de Ana		
1994	Novia que te vea	Maestro	
1994	Ámbar	Capitán Borsac	
1996	Sucesos distantes	Victor Fet	
1999	Preludio		
2000	Amores perros	El Chivo	
2001	Y tu mamá también	Miguel Iturbide	
2002	Vivir mata	Heliut	
2002	Die Another Day	Raoul	
2004	The Alamo	Antonio López de Santa Anna	
2006	Babel	Emilio	
2007	El búfalo de la noche	Ramírez	
2007	Malos hábitos	Ramón / Padre de Matilde / Matilde's father	
2010	El mar muerto	Teporocho	
2010	Sin memoria	Torres	
2011	Memoria de mis putas tristes	Sabio / Journalist-old	
2011	El sueño de Lu	Lucia's Father	
2012	Colosio: El asesinato	Don Fernando Gutiérrez Barrios	
2014	Words with Gods		
2014	Filosofía Natural del Amor	Narrador	Voice
2015	A Monster with a Thousand Heads	Enrique Sandoval Núñez	
2016	The Chosen	Salazar	

== Accolades ==
Year	Award	Category	Work	Result	Ref.
2016	58th Ariel Awards	Best Supporting Actor	A Monster with a Thousand Heads	Nominated	
2018	60th Ariel Awards	Best Supporting Actor	The Chosen	Nominated	
