= The Dinosaurs Extinction =

- Promotional poster
- Based on: La extinción de los dinosaurios by Luis Ayhllon
- Screenplay by: Luis Ayhllon
- Directed by: Luis Ayhllon
- Starring: Enrique Muñoz; Gastón Melo; Alberto Agnesi
- Music by: Carlo Ayhllon
- Country of origin: Mexico
- Original language: Spanish

Production
- Producers: Mónica Gorbea; Adriana Ortega
- Cinematography: Ivan Hernandez
- Editors: Roberto Bolado; Diego Cohen
- Running time: 83 minutes
- Production companies: Goliat Films; Channel 22 Metropolitana Television

Original release
- Release: 2014

The Dinosaurs Extinction (Spanish: La extinción de los dinosaurios) is a 2014 Mexican television comedy film written and directed by Luis Ayhllon. It is based on the play of the same name by the same director. Starring Enrique Muñoz, Gastón Melo and Alberto Agnesi. The film was nominated for Best Adapted Screenplay at the 58th Ariel Awards.

== Synopsis ==
Siegfried is diagnosed with cancer. Needing money to survive, he decides to call an old acquaintance, Lorenzo, with the intention of selling him his house. However, the latter has a side plan that will benefit them both: rob a jewelry store.

== Cast ==
The actors participating in this film are:

- Alberto Agnesi
- Gastón Melo
- Enrique Muñoz
- Silvana Vazquez as Sofia

== Accolades ==
Year	Award	Category	Recipient	Result	Ref.
2016	58th Ariel Awards	Best Adapted Screenplay	Luis Ayhllón	Nominated	
