= Caminos de Guanajuato =

Mexican telenovela

- International poster
- Also known as: Cantando el corazón; Olvidé que te quería
- Genre: Telenovela
- Created by: Ramón Campos; Gema R. Neira
- Written by: Luis Felipe Ibarra
- Starring: Iliana Fox; Erik Hayser; Alejandra Lazcano; Alberto Guerra
- Theme music composer: José Alfredo Jiménez
- Opening theme: "En el último trago" by Concha Buika
- Country of origin: Mexico
- Original language: Spanish
- No. of episodes: 90

Production
- Executive producer: Javier Pons
- Production locations: Buenos Aires, Argentina; Guanajuato, Mexico
- Camera setup: Multi-camera
- Running time: 42-60 minutes

Original release
- Network: Azteca Trece
- Release: May 11 – September 11, 2015

Related
- Gran Reserva (2010–13); Reserva de familia (2012)

Caminos de Guanajuato is a Mexican telenovela produced by Javier Pons for TV Azteca. It is based on the Spanish soap opera Gran Reserva produced in 2010.

Iliana Fox and Erik Hayser star as the main protagonists, while Alejandra Lazcano and Alberto Guerra as the main antagonists.

== Plot ==
In a large wine-growing region, the producers of a single vineyard strive to create the finest wines amongst fierce competition. In this region, cruelty and disloyalty have a name: Melchor Coronel.

The Coronel family are the wealthy owners of the Coronel wineries. Years ago, Melchor and his friend Alonso Rivero helped expand wine production throughout the region. But Melchor wanted the prosperity for himself, so he deceived and cheated Alonso, leaving the Rivero Vineyard in ruins. The vineyard survived thanks to Alonso's efforts, but their friendship was dead and buried.

== Production ==
Production of Caminos de Guanajuato officially started on February 23, 2015 in Buenos Aires, Argentina. The telenovela is known in the rest of the world as Olvidé que te quería, although it was formerly known as Cantando al corazón.

On May 7, 2015, Iliana Fox and Erik Hayser were invited to participate the program El hormiguero, where the main theme of the telenovela, is relieved the subject is portrayed by Concha Buika and the song is called "En el último trago".

== Cast ==
- Iliana Fox as Florencia Rivero
- Erik Hayser as Giberlto Coronel
- Alejandra Lazcano as María Clara Portillo
- Dolores Heredia as Magdalena Lozada
- Álvaro Guerrero as Melchor Coronel
- Alberto Guerra as Rómulo Coronel
- Claudio Lafarga as Darío Rivero
- Fabián Corres as Pascual Coronel
- Israel Amescua as Ramón Coronel
- Sylvia Saenz as Olivia Peñalosa
- Vanessa Acosta as Alba Coronel
- Rodolfo Arias as Alonso Rivero
- Emilio Guerrero as Chavero
- Nohelia Betancourt as Celeste
- Marco Pérez as Alfredo
- Christian Vazquez as Celso
- Ramiro Tomasini as Hernán
- Pablo Olewski as Young Alonso
- Alan Ciangherotti as Madero
- Juanma Muñoz as José Ángel
- Eduardo Mendoza Vargas as Mati

== Mexico broadcast ==
Timeslot (ET/PT)	No. of episodes	Premiered		Ended	
Timeslot (ET/PT)	No. of episodes	Date	Premiere Ratings	Date	Finale Ratings
Monday to Friday 9:03PM	90	May 11, 2015	5.7	September 11, 2915	—N/a

=== Episodes ===
No. overall	No. in season	Title	Original release date
1	1	"Alonso Rivero dies under suspicious circumstances"	May 11, 2015
2	2	"Melchor discovers Gilberto's betrayal"	May 12, 2015
3	3	"Gilberto is the victim of an attack"	May 13, 2015
4	4	"Florencia accepts the Coronel's offer"	May 14, 2015
5	5	"Florencia confirms her feelings for Gilberto"	May 15, 2015
6	6	"Gilberto is linked to a man's death"	May 18, 2015
7	7	"Secrets from the past are about to be revealed"	May 19, 2015
8	8	"Gilberto's rivalry with his family begins"	May 20, 2015
9	9	"New revelations about Gilberto's dark past come to light"	May 21, 2015
10	10	"An accident that will change the Rivero family's fortunes"	May 22, 2015
11	11	"The rivalry between the Coronel family intensifies"	May 25, 2015
12	12	"Rómulo betrayed the Coronel family"	May 26, 2015
13	13	"Melchor could be a suspect in the attack against Gilberto"	May 27, 2015
14	14	"María Clara gives in to Melchor's pressure and agrees to testify against Gilberto"	May 28, 2015
15	15	"Another betrayal for Florencia Rivero"	May 29, 2015
16	16	"A marriage proposal from the Coronels"	June 1, 2015
17	17	"A member of the Coronel's life is in danger"	June 2, 2015
18	18	"Javier Zamora will change the Rivero family's destiny"	June 3, 2015
19	19	"Alfredo is about to be discovered"	June 4, 2015
20	20	"The Riveros revoke their contract with the Coronels"	June 5, 2015
21	21	"Alba is about to discover Celeste's killer"	June 8, 2015
22	22	"Rómulo is the Riveros' new partner"	June 9, 2015
23	23	"Olivia confides in María Clara"	June 10, 2015
24	24	"Another accident that benefits a Coronel"	June 11, 2015
25	25	"Olivia is the new suspect in the attack on Gilberto"	June 12, 2015
26	26	"A Coronel dies"	June 15, 2015
27	27	"María Clara tries to kill Melchor"	June 16, 2015
28	28	"The old Gilberto is back"	June 17, 2015
29	29	"María Clara threatens Melchor with death"	June 18, 2015
30	30	"Melchor has an accident"	June 19, 2015
31	31	"Florencia falls into Rómulo's trap"	June 22, 2015
32	32	"An accident to clarify"	June 23, 2015
33	33	"María Clara is determined to win Gilberto back"	June 24, 2015
34	34	"Florencia, suspected of setting fire to the Coronel vineyards"	June 25, 2015
35	35	"Everything seems to indicate that Florencia will go to prison"	June 26, 2015
36	36	"María Clara exposes Sonia"	June 29, 2015
37	37	"Rómulo is not willing to lose 'El Tuerto's' vineyards"	June 30, 2015
38	38	"Rómulo managed to sideline Darío"	July 1, 2015
39	39	"Olivia returns to ruin the Coronels"	July 2, 2015
40	40	"The rivalry between Sonia and Melchor grows"	July 3, 2015
41	41	"The secret of the Rivero vineyards disappeared"	July 6, 2015
42	42	"Who is Irene Salcedo?"	July 7, 2015
43	43	"Lorena ready to ruin Rómulo"	July 8, 2015
44	44	"Rosaura appears before Alba and Pascual"	July 9, 2015
45	45	"Melchor surprises Alba with Manuel"	July 10, 2015
46	46	"Melchor suffers a heart attack"	July 13, 2015
47	47	"Gilberto: Alonso Rivero's killer?"	July 14, 2015
48	48	"Alba's life is in danger"	July 15, 2015
49	49	"María Clara returned"	July 16, 2015
50	50	"Alba discovers that Manuel was Olivia's accomplice"	July 17, 2015
51	51	"Florencia agrees to marry Rómulo"	July 20, 2015
52	52	"Florencia and Rómulo's wedding"	July 21, 2015
53	53	"Darío reveals his crime"	July 22, 2015
54	54	"The arrival of a Rivero"	July 23, 2015
55	55	"Florencia discovers she is pregnant"	July 24, 2015
56	56	"Alfredo, Alba's shadow"	July 27, 2015
57	57	"Darío confronts Gilberto"	July 28, 2015
58	58	"Alba manages to find Manuel's body"	July 29, 2015
59	59	"Manuel's body is located"	July 30, 2015
60	60	"Pascual will sell his land to the highest bidder"	July 31, 2015
61	61	"Threatening Melchor was a grave mistake, Alfredo"	August 3, 2015
62	62	"Alfredo in prison for Manuel's death"	August 4, 2015
63	63	"Florencia could return to prison"	August 5, 2015
64	64	"Ramón seduces Mar"	August 6, 2015
65	65	"Florencia's freedom is in Marcos's hands"	August 7, 2015
66	66	"Rosaura's secrets begin to come to light"	August 10, 2015
67	67	"Melchor won't let Rómulo go to prison"	August 11, 2015
68	68	"A Coronel on the verge of death"	August 12, 2015
69	69	"Rosaura was poisoned"	August 13, 2015
70	70	"Gilberto contacts Rómulo"	August 14, 2015
71	71	"Rómulo returned"	August 17, 2015
72	72	"Rómulo introduces himself to the Coronels"	August 18, 2015
73	73	"Who is Julia Coronel?"	August 19, 2015
74	74	"Bad news for Florencia"	August 20, 2015
75	75	"Florencia goes to prison"	August 21, 2015
76	76	"Sonia sets a trap for Melchor"	August 24, 2015
77	77	"Marcos proposes to Florencia"	August 25, 2015
78	78	"Alba confirms Ramón as a Coronel"	August 26, 2015
79	79	"Gilberto will distance himself from everyone"	August 27, 2015
80	80	"Ramón discovers he is a Colonel"	August 28, 2015
81	81	"María Clara will do something crazy"	August 31, 2015
82	82	"Final Chapters: Chapter 82"	September 1, 2015
83	83	"Final Chapters: Chapter 83"	September 2, 2015
84	84	"Final Chapters: Chapter 84"	September 3, 2015
85	85	"Final Chapters: Chapter 85"	September 4, 2015
86	86	"Grand Finale: Chapter 86"	September 7, 2015
87	87	"Grand Finale: Chapter 87"	September 8, 2015
88	88	"Grand Finale: Chapter 88"	September 9, 2015
89	89	"Grand Finale: Chapter 89"	September 10, 2015
90	90	"Grand Finale: Chapter 90"	September 11, 2015

== See also ==
- List of telenovelas of TV Azteca
