= Alan B. Curtiss =

Alan Bradford Curtiss is an assistant director and producer of Hollywood films who has been active in the Directors Guild of America, after starting as a location manager in 1978. He is a resident of Manhattan Beach, California.

== Career highlights ==
Curtiss has been a member of at least three directorial teams nominated for the Directors Guild of America Award for Outstanding Directing – Feature Film, for The Truman Show (1998), The Green Mile (1999), and Master and Commander: The Far Side of the World (2003). He is especially known for close collaborations with director Peter Weir, including two of those three DGA nominations. The DGA elected Curtiss to several terms as an Associate Member of its National Board of Directors (2011–2019).

Curtiss also served as executive producer of Master and Commander. He and Oscar winner Barrie M. Osborne were among the lead producers who released the major Hispanic film Gloria (2014), a biopic about the controversial Mexican pop star Gloria Trevi.

The DGA has recognized Curtiss for his long mentorship of assistant directors (ADs), unit production managers (UPMs), and production assistants (PAs). As he described in a 2004 forum spotlighting directorial teams: "It is called the 'director's team' and I think there's a reason for that... Currently my key 2nd is somebody who I've done ten films with but he started off as a set PA and then over the years moved up. Probably five of my former key 2nds are now out 1st AD-ing and production managing, so it's been a normal cycle of experience and knowledge; as they've gone up the ladder, other people have come to the fore."

== Filmography ==
Curtiss is credited for the following films:

- Brian Banks (2018)
- Gloria (2014)
- World War Z (2013)
- Something Borrowed (2011)
- Love Ranch (2010)
- The Way Back (2010)
- First Sunday (2008)
- The Happening (2008)
- The Prestige (2006)
- Jarhead (2005)
- Christmas with the Kranks (2004)
- Master and Commander: The Far Side of the World (2003)
- Peter Pan (2003)
- Dragonfly (2002)
- Cast Away (2000)
- The Perfect Storm (2000)
- The Green Mile (1999)
- Patch Adams (1998)
- The Truman Show (1998)
- The Devil's Own (1997)
- Michael (1996)
- Get Shorty (1995)
- Ace Ventura: When Nature Calls (1995)
- Waterworld (1995)
- Clear and Present Danger (1994)
- Intersection (1994)
- Fearless (1993)
- Consenting Adults (1992)
- For Richer, for Poorer (1992)
- For the Boys (1991)
- Green Card (1990)
- Taking Care of Business (1990)
- Dead Poets Society (1989)
- Harlem Nights (1989)
- My Stepmother Is An Alien (1988)
- The Presidio (1988)
- Vibes (1988)
- A Tiger's Tale (1987)
- Wanted: Dead or Alive (1987)
- Nothing in Common (1986)
- Clue (1985)
- Jagged Edge (1985)
- The Man With One Red Shoe (1985)
- 2010 (1984)
- Cloak & Dagger (1984)
- The Lonely Guy (1984)
- Max Dugan Returns (1983)
- Romantic Comedy (1983)
- I Ought to Be in Pictures (1982)
- Mommie Dearest (1981)
- Coast to Coast (1980)
- Heaven's Gate (1980)
- Grease (1978)
- Moment by Moment (1978)
