= Alberto Agnesi =

Mexican telenovela and stage actor

- Born: November 21, 1977 (age 48); Guadalajara, Jalisco, Mexico
- Occupation: Actor

Alberto Agnesi (born November 21, 1977) is a Mexican telenovela and stage actor. He has recently acted in Señora acero, La leona and Operación Pacífico.

== Life ==
He is known because his Tequila brand Señor de los cielos, Reina del sur and Auténtico Corajillo.

== Filmography ==
Television roles
Year	Title	Role	Notes
2005	Mujer, casos de la vida real	Unknown role	Episode: "Ninguna oportunidad"
2005	Barrera de amor	Daniel Romero	Recurring role; 99 episodes
2007	Lola, érase una vez	Patrick	Recurring role
2008–2009	Juro que te amo	Renato Lazcano	Recurring role; 140 episodes
2010–2011	Llena de amor	Andrés	Episodes: "Deseo material" and "El rescate de Ilitia"
2011–2014	Como dice el dicho	Various roles	3 episodes
2011	El Diez	Jorge Alberto Dumont	Recurring role; 5 episodes
2012	Abismo de pasión	Enrique Tovar	Recurring role; 103 episodes
2013	Mentir para vivir	Antonio Araujo	Recurring role; 61 episodes
2014	The Dinosaurs Extinction		Main role; Telefilm
2014–2018	Señora Acero	Marcelo Dóriga	Recurring role (seasons 1–4); 226 episodes
2018	La jefa del campeón	Waldo Bravo	Main role; 61 episodes
2019	Doña Flor y sus dos maridos	Atahualpa	Series regular; 39 episodes
