= Marco Pérez (actor) =

Mexican actor and writer (born 1977)

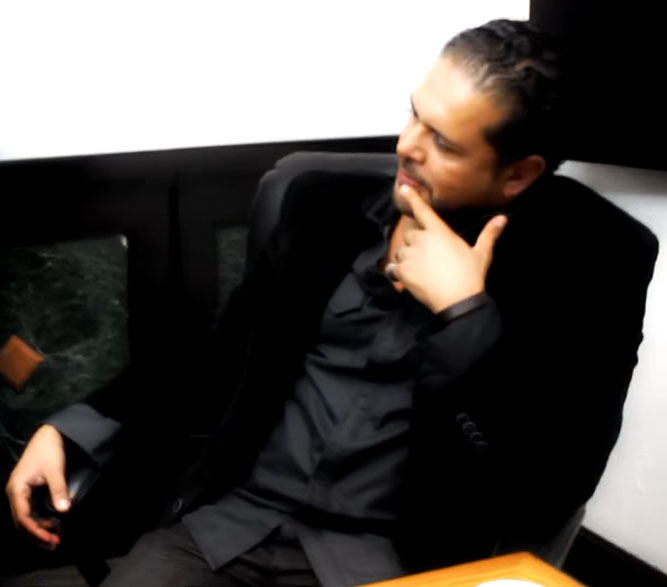
- Born: March 17, 1977 (age 49); Mexico City, Mexico
- Occupations: Actor, writer
- Years active: 2000–present

Marco Pérez (born March 17, 1977) is a Mexican actor and writer. He began his artistic career working in experimental theater in Jalisco. After moving to Mexico City he was cast as Ramiro in the film Amores perros directed by Mexican filmmaker Alejandro González Iñárritu in 2000. Pérez has worked extensively on TV series, including Capadocia (2010), El 8° Mandamiento (2011), El Señor de los Cielos (2013), Señora Acero (2014), Caminos de Guanajuato (2015), and the El Señor de los Cielos spin-off El Chema (2016).

Pérez is also featured in several films including Trade (2007), Backyard: El Traspatio (2009), Días de Gracia (2011), Mariachi Gringo (2012), Colosio: El Asesinato (2012), La vida precoz y breve de Sabina Rivas (2012), and Desierto (2015). For his performance of Comandante in the film Mexican Gangster: La Leyenda del Charro Misterioso he received a Diosa de Plata nomination for Best Supporting Actor. He received further recognition for playing record producer Sergio Andrade in the Mexican film Gloria, for which he was nominated for a Diosa de Plata and won the Ariel Award for Best Actor in 2016.

== Background ==
Marco Pérez was born in Mexico City on March 17, 1977. At age 14, he began his professional career at an experimental theater in Jalisco, and later relocated to Mexico City to keep working in theater with director Martín Acosta. Pérez wrote the plays Hipótesis del Sueño, El Orgullo del Pajarraco, and El Saxofonista, all based on experiences of his youth.

== Career ==
=== Early work ===
Pérez debuted on screen with the film Amores perros (2000), directed by Alejandro González Iñárritu. In the film, Pérez played Ramiro, the brother of Gael García Bernal's character, Octavio. The following year he was also included in the short film Powder Keg by González Iñárritu and in 2004 was featured in La Sombra del Sahuaro, filmed in the desert of Sonora with the actors Eduardo Santamarina and Itatí Cantoral. Trade (2007), La Garganta del Diablo (2008), and Backyard: El Traspatio (2008), followed. In 2009, he joined the second season of the TV series Capadocia in the role of Emiliano Treviño. In 2011, Pérez played Mauricio (the private secretary of the Attorney General of Mexico) in the TV series El 8° Mandamiento for Argos TV and also played Gabino in Días de Gracia, directed by Everardo Gout and starring Tenoch Huerta Mejía. Pérez and Huerta re-teamed in 2015 in the film Mexican Gangster: La Leyenda del Charro Misterioso, directed by José Manuel Cravioto. For his role of Comandante in Mexican Gangster, Pérez was nominated for a Diosa de Plata for Best Supporting Actor. La vida precoz y breve de Sabina Rivas, Colosio: El asesinato, and Mariachi Gringo were released in 2012. Pérez was cast as Guadalupe Robles (a role based on real life drug trafficker Ramón Arellano Félix) in the TV series El Señor de los Cielos.

=== Breakthrough role with Gloria ===
In 2014, Sofia Espinosa and Pérez were cast as singer-songwriter Gloria Trevi and record producer Sergio Andrade, respectively, in the film Gloria. The movie chronicles the rise and fall of the singer's career, detailing Trevi's first encounter with Andrade (who became her mentor), her brief tenure on a band, her musical rise to stardom, a sex scandal involving minors, and her imprisonment in Brasil. Pérez initially rejected the role since it was not a subject matter that moved him in an artistic way. "I read the script, then I heard more and more the voice of Gloria [Trevi] herself, without the need to deepen as the scandal that it was, that was the thing I rejected a bit. But I was finding that the story lends itself to also tell a behind-the-scenes, what lies behind a character as stigmatized as [Sergio] Andrade", Pérez told Radio Fórmula. To fully prepare for the role, Pérez gained weight interviewed Andrade to clarify some issues and delve into some of his experiences. The film was premiered in Mexico on January 1, 2015, as it was distributed by Universal Pictures with 1,000 copies. Pérez received mixed critical reviews for his performance; Jessica Oliva of Cine Premiere magazine stated that "Marco Perez [Sergio Andrade] manages to embody the duality of that genius of the industry, perverse and visionary at the same time". Sofía Ochoa and Verónica Sánchez of En Filme were critical about the fact that Pérez was "flat", with no further explaining on how Andrade achieved his domain over women, "drawing a caricature of a public figure, [that] not only was complex and imposing, he was talented to some extent, very Machiavellian, ambitious, egotistical, narcissistic and unscrupulous". David Noh of Film Journal International also gave a negative review, since the actor "is too unremittingly slimy and completely lacking in magnetic charisma to be convincing as such an irresistible and titanic A&R lothario". In Mexico, Pérez was nominated for a Diosa de Plata and won the Ariel Award for Best Actor for Gloria.

=== Later work ===
Pérez played Felipe Murillo during the first season of Telemundo's Señora Acero (2014). In 2015, he was included in the cast of the film Desierto, directed by Jonás Cuarón. In the film, Pérez co-stars with Gael García Bernal and American actor Jeffrey Dean Morgan, and plays Lobo, a smuggler. On this role, Pérez noted, "He is a character that came into my hands and got to my skin. I feel like I gave life to a cold guy, without compassion for the migrants". The same year, Pérez was featured in the Mexican telenovela Caminos de Guanajuato for TV Azteca. In 2016, Pérez joined the cast of the El Señor de los Cielos spin-off El Chema, starred by Mexican actor Mauricio Ochmann.

== Filmography ==
=== Film ===
| Year | Title | Role | Notes | Ref. |
|---|---|---|---|---|
| 2000 | Amores perros | Ramiro | | |
| 2005 | La Sombra del Sahuaro | Carlos | | |
| 2007 | Trade | Manuelo | | |
| 2008 | La Garganta del Diablo | — | | |
| 2009 | Backyard | Fierro | | |
| 2011 | Días de Gracia | Gabino | | |
| 2011 | La Brujula La Lleva el Muerto | Rogelio | | |
| 2012 | Mariachi Gringo | Judicial | | |
| 2012 | Colosio: El Asesinato | Juan Antonio Montalbán "El Seco" | | |
| 2012 | La vida precoz y breve de Sabina Rivas | Alipio | | |
| 2014 | Gloria | Sergio Andrade | Ariel Award for Best Actor; Nominated – Diosa de Plata for Best Actor | |
| 2014 | Mexican Gangster: La Leyenda del Charro Misterioso (also known as El Más Buscado) | Comandante | Nominated – Diosa de Plata for Best Supporting Actor | |
| 2015 | Aerosol | Nuk | | |
| 2015 | Desierto | Lobo | | |

=== Television ===
| Year | Title | Role | Notes | Ref. |
|---|---|---|---|---|
| 2010 | Capadocia | Emiliano Treviño | Season 2 | |
| 2010 | Sons of Anarchy | Calaveras #1 | Season 3 | |
| 2011 | El octavo mandamiento | Mauricio Álvarez | — | |
| 2013 | El Señor de los Cielos | Guadalupe Robles | 43 episodes | |
| 2014 | Señora Acero | Felipe Murillo | Season 1 | |
| 2015 | Caminos de Guanajuato | Alfredo "Freddy" Calles | — | |
| 2016 | El Chema | Guadalupe Robles | — | |
