= La niña en la piedra =

La Niña en la Piedra (Nadie Te Ve)
- Mexican theatrical release poster
- Directed by: Maryse Sistach
- Produced by: José Buil
- Starring: Sofía Espinosa; Gabino Rodríguez
- Cinematography: Servando Gajá
- Music by: Eduardo Gamboa
- Release date: 2006
- Running time: 104 minutes
- Country: Mexico
- Language: Spanish

La Niña en la Piedra (Nadie Te Ve) (The Girl On the Stone: No One Sees You) is a 2006 Mexican drama film, directed by Maryse Sistach. The film received three Ariel Awards nominations in 2007: Best Actor, Best Actress and Best Original Score.

== Plot ==
Gabino (Gabino Rodríguez), a very dedicated and hardworking young high school student, he is infatuated with Maty (Sofía Espinosa) and tries to make her fall in love with him. After an incident in the school, where Gabino and his two friends are suspended for harassing Maty, she rejects him for the last time causing Gabino to plan a revenge against Maty.

== Main cast ==
- Gabino Rodríguez as Gabino
- Sofía Espinosa as Maty
- Ricardo Polanco as Delfino
- Iyantú Fonseca as Fulgencio
- Alejandro Calva as Fidel
- Silverio Palacios as Amadeo
- Ximena Ayala as Perla
- Arcelia Ramírez as Alicia
- Luis Gerardo Méndez as Joaquín

== Awards ==
=== Ariel Awards ===
The Ariel Awards are awarded annually by the Mexican Academy of Film Arts and Sciences in Mexico. La Niña en la Piedra (Nadie Te Ve) received three nominations.

Year	Nominee / work	Award	Result
2007	Gabino Rodríguez	Best Actor	Nominated
2007	Sofía Espinosa	Best Actress	Nominated
2007	Eduardo Gamboa	Best Original Score	Nominated
