= La Hermandad (TV series) =

Mexican psychological thriller television series

- Genre: Psychological thriller; Drama
- Created by: Rosa Clemente García; Raúl Prieto
- Written by: Raúl Prieto; Connie Acosta; Rosa Clemente García; Luis Daniel Yepes
- Directed by: Humberto Hinojosa Ozcariz; Carlos Bolado
- Creative director: Óscar Tello
- Starring: Manolo Cardona; Paz Vega; Stephanie Cayo; Andrés Almeida; Rodrigo Oviedo; Rodrigo Murray; José Sefami; Jana Raluy; Claudette Maillé; Ari Brickman; Enoc Leaño; Tomás Rojas; Mauricio Isaac; Irineo Álvarez; Gerardo Trejo Luna; Noé Hernández
- Music by: Alvaro Arce Urroz
- Country of origin: Mexico
- Original language: Spanish
- No. of seasons: 2
- No. of episodes: 26

Production
- Executive producers: Juan José Cardona; Manolo Cardona; Erica Sánchez Su
- Producer: Juan Uruchurtu
- Editors: Camilo Abadía; César Galán; Javier Santos
- Production companies: 11:11 Films & TV

Original release
- Network: Claro video
- Release: June 2, 2016 – July 6, 2017

La Hermandad is a Mexican drama television series produced by Claro video in collaboration with 11:11 Films & TV. It is an original idea of Rosa Clemente and Raúl Prieto. It stars Manolo Cardona as an actor and executive producer. The series revolves around Julio, a man who prepares to enact revenge against an entire criminal organization within the police forces.

The first season consists of fourteen episodes premiered on June 2, 2016. On November 1, 2016, Carlos Bolado confirmed that the series would have a second season, which consists of 12 episodes.

== Synopsis ==
The first season tells the story of Julio Kaczinski, a prestigious psychiatrist from the Capital, who is destroyed by the violent death of his wife and daughter, for which he has become an alcoholic and mediocre forensic psychiatrist of the Federal Police Command. For a dry blow of fate, he begins to treat a patient who is part of a secret group of policemen called "La Hermandad", who do justice on their own and were the cause of their tragedy.

== Cast ==
=== Main ===
- Manolo Cardona as Julio Kaczinski
- Paz Vega as Luisa Salinas
- Stephanie Cayo as Milena
- Andrés Almeida as Rubén Chávez
- Rodrigo Oviedo as Daniel Acosta
- Rodrigo Murray as Florencio
- José Sefami as Manuel Navarro
- Jana Raluy as Karla Esteban
- Claudette Maillé as Ludmila Carrillo
- Ari Brickman as Iván
- Enoc Leaño as Ezequiel
- Tomás Rojas as Mario
- Mauricio Isaac as Azrael Manzilla
- Irineo Álvarez as Juan Jacinto Arias
- Gerardo Trejo Luna as Francisco
- Noé Hernández as Pedro

=== Recurring ===
- Erik Hayser as Alejandro
- Marcela Mar as Isabela
- Orlando Moguel as Jesús Flores
- Alejandra Ambrosi as Diana
- Ricardo Kleinbaum as Federico Zuluaga
- Carolina Sepúlveda as Rocío

=== Special participation ===
- Olga Segura as Sara Frei
- Carlos Corona as Andrés
- Paulina Dávila as Andrea Chávez

=== Season 2 ===
- Paola Núñez as Natalia Alagón

== Broadcast ==
The series debuted on June 2, 2016 on the ClaroVideo digital platform. On March 5, 2017 the serie debuted on television on UniMás.

== Episodes ==
=== Series overview ===
Season	Episodes	Originally released
1	14	June 2, 2016
2	12	July 6, 2017

=== Season 1 (2016) ===
No. overall	No. in season	Title	Original release date	U.S. Air date	US viewers (millions)
1	1	"De cara con la venganza"	June 2, 2016	March 5, 2017	0.39
The prestigious psychiatrist Julio Kaczinski falls into disgrace after losing his family.
2	2	"El primero de todos"	June 2, 2016	March 12, 2017	0.36
Diego, a corrupt police officer, tells Julio in detail the murder of his family, without knowing that he is suffering from the crime. Julio takes advantage of Luisa's research on The Brotherhood and clumsily orchestrates the death of his first victim.
3	3	"La cacería mental"	June 2, 2016	March 19, 2017	0.29
Rubén begins to investigate the mysterious death of one of the CPF officers.
4	4	"Daño colateral"	June 2, 2016	March 26, 2017	0.30
An inspector is seriously injured in an attack on the outskirts of the CPF.
5	5	"El talón de Aquiles"	June 2, 2016	April 2, 2017	0.31
Luisa gets a search warrant to check a suspect's trailer.
6	6	"Quién es quién"	June 2, 2016	April 9, 2017	0.30
Luisa is involved in a murder, so she asks for help to Ezequiel.
7	7	"Máscara caída"	June 2, 2016	April 16, 2017	0.27
Simón investigates the Roche case while Analy discovers a suspect about the day she went to the clinic.
8	8	"El suicida"	June 2, 2016	April 23, 2017	0.38
Internal affairs receives a noticeable drop that complicates the investigation.
9	9	"Punto en contra"	June 2, 2016	April 30, 2017	0.32
Julio decides to continue his revenge while Luisa joins Ezequiel to deal with the case of "La Hermandad".
10	10	"El suplantador"	June 2, 2016	May 7, 2017	0.27
Luisa begins to find out information about Julio Kaczinski and César Aguilar.
11	11	"Desde adentro"	June 2, 2016	May 21, 2017	N/A
Milena gets information that will change the course of things, while Julio and Luisa begin to work hand in hand.
12	12	"Operación rapiña"	June 2, 2016	May 28, 2017	0.25
Julio protects Milena despite harming the investigation, while Pedro asks Julio for help.
13	13	"El vuelo del águila"	June 2, 2016	June 4, 2017	0.34
Milena is threatened by La Hermandad and Pedro confesses to Julio the terrible story of his life.
14	14	"El regreso"	June 2, 2016	June 11, 2017	0.23
Julio is about to complete the first part of his revenge.

=== Season 2 (2017) ===
No. overall	No. in season	Title	Original release date
15	1	"Tras el rastro"	July 6, 2017
Julio begins to look for and continues his plan of immersion in the Brotherhood. Remigio begins to suspect that Luisa Salinas is alive and asks Guillermo for a second DNA test. Ludmila asks Karla to investigate the death of her husband.
16	2	"Sospechas"	July 6, 2017
Julio finds Sixto and discovers that he is the father of Pedro Castro. Luisa meets Jorge Cubides and Alejandro to investigate why they are chasing after her family. Gorka and Jaime come together to launch the new plan of The Brotherhood.
17	3	"Deudas del pasado"	July 6, 2017
Remigio meets with Calvario and he asks for help for his brother. Guillermo and Damián are going to meet Luisa. Julio gains the trust of Christian and Xavier, two children abused by Sixto who seek revenge on him.
18	4	"El siguiente"	July 6, 2017
Julio, Christian and Xavier bury the body of Sixto, while Mercedes goes to the CPF and presents the complaint of his disappearance. Rolando Pereyra takes the complaint and begins to investigate. Julio begins to inquire Manuel. Calvario fulfills his task.
19	5	"Revelaciones"	July 6, 2017
Rolando makes an inspection of Sixto's corpse and takes Xavier. Remigio threatens to Guillermo and discovers that Luisa is alive. Julio is taken to the CPF to analyze Xavier and this one can make a spoken picture of the murderer of Sixto.
20	6	"Cara a cara con la muerte"	July 6, 2017
Eduardo leaves the isolation cell. Julio visits him and promises his help to get out of there. Luisa calls Julio and tells him that Karla found a gun in the house of Rubén Chávez and his suspicions of who could be.
21	7	"Sentencia anticipada"	July 6, 2017
Julio is tortured by his captors but still does not know who they are. Luisa tells about La Hermandad, who collects all the information and decides to publish it in the newspaper El Poblador. Karla goes to see Mario.
22	8	"Un alto precio"	July 6, 2017
Karla knows Luisa is alive. Julio is ordered to kill Iván to finish what he started and he has to do to prove his loyalty. Then he quotes Ivan with the excuse of having information about La Hermandad that he is interested in knowing.
23	9	"Cabo suelto"	July 6, 2017
They find Rubén Chávez burnt wrapped in a carpet. Luisa faces Julio blaming him for the murder, but he changes the play and makes her believe that it was someone else. Julio is invited to a meeting of La Hermandad.
24	10	"Cambio de planes"	July 6, 2017
Karla reserves a room in the motel near the one of Julio and installs cameras in his room to spy it. Romina confesses to Julio that she killed Lorena. Karla discovers that Julio's room lacks a carpet.
25	11	"Desde el corazón de La Hermandad"	July 6, 2017
Florencio wants to delegate in Julio his post when he is The Angel. Rolando goes to Chimalhuacán to the orphanage where Luna was and discovers a box with the identities of the children.
26	12	"El ángel caido"	July 6, 2017
Julio calls Romina's cell phone. Eduardo and Julio try to convince him to kill. Eduardo shoots someone while an operative balances Eduardo.
