= Inquilinos =

- Directed by: Chava Cartas
- Screenplay by: Juan Carlos Garzón; Angélica Gudiño
- Starring: Danny Perea; Erick Elías
- Cinematography: Patricio López
- Edited by: Martha Poly Vil
- Music by: Ximena Sariñana; Dan Zlotnik
- Release date: 1 November 2018 (Mexico)
- Country: Mexico
- Language: Spanish

Inquilinos is a 2018 Mexican horror film directed by Chava Cartas, from a screenplay by Juan Carlos Garzón and Angélica Gudiño. The plot revolves around Luzma (Danny Perea) and Demián (Erick Elías), a young couple, who have just moved to an old neighborhood to leave behind an incident that torments them. However, Luzma begins to discover that her neighbors hide terrible secrets that lead to paranormal phenomena. The film is based on real events and was filmed in Guadalajara, Mexico.

== Cast ==
- Danny Perea as Luzma
- Erick Elías as Demián
- Fernando Ciangherotti as Sacerdote
- Dagoberto Gama as Antonio
- Noé Hernández as Marcelino
- Gabriela Roel as Irma
- Camila Selser as Judith
- Evangelina Martínez as Socorro
- Alberto Guerra
- Luis Arrieta
- Zuria Vega
