= El más buscado =

- Mexican movie poster
- Directed by: José Manuel Cravioto
- Screenplay by: José Manuel Cravioto
- Produced by: Alexis Fridman; Billy Rovzar; Fernando Rovzar
- Starring: Tenoch Huerta; Marco Pérez; Gerardo Taracena; Paola Núñez; Rocío Verdejo; Vanessa Mateo
- Cinematography: Tonatiuh Martínez
- Edited by: Jorge Macaya
- Music by: Andrés Sánchez
- Production company: Lemon Films
- Release date: October 23, 2014 (Morelia)
- Running time: 101 minutes
- Country: Mexico
- Language: Spanish
- Budget: MXN$40,000,000

El más buscado ("The Most Wanted") is a 2014 Mexican crime film, directed and written by José Manuel Cravioto. The film was also released as Mexican Gangster: La Leyenda del Charro Misterioso and is based on the life of Alfredo Ríos Galeana, a real life bank thief, considered the most prolific thief in the history of Mexico. The film stars Tenoch Huerta as Ríos Galeana and shows his assaults, personal relationships and his career singing as a mariachi.

The film is a follow-up of a documentary El Charro Misterioso (2005), and was premiered 2015 Morelia International Film Festival. The film also received eight nominations for the Ariel Awards of 2016 for Best Actor, Original Score, Special and Visual Effects, Art Direction, Cinematography, Costume Design and Makeup.

== Cast ==
- Tenoch Huerta as Charro Misterioso / Alfredo Ríos Galeana
- Marco Pérez as Comandante
- Paola Núñez
- Gerardo Taracena
- Rocío Verdejo

== Awards and nominations ==
Award	Category	Nominee	Result
58th Ariel Awards	Best Actor	Tenoch Huerta	Nominated
58th Ariel Awards	Best Art Direction	Bárbara Enríquez and Alejandro García	Won
58th Ariel Awards	Best Cinematography	Tonatiuh Martínez	Nominated
58th Ariel Awards	Best Costume Design	Gilda Navarro	Won
58th Ariel Awards	Best Makeup	Marco Antonio Hernández	Nominated
58th Ariel Awards	Best Original Score	Andrés Sánchez Maher	Nominated
58th Ariel Awards	Best Special Effects	Alejandro Vázquez	Won
58th Ariel Awards	Best Visual Effects	Edgardo Mejía, Francisco Castillo, Rodrigo de Gante, José Luis Gómez, José Ignacio Narváez, Ivonne Orobio and José Manuel Romero	Won
55th Diosas de Plata	Best Picture	José Manuel Cravioto	Won
55th Diosas de Plata	Best Director	José Manuel Cravioto	Won
55th Diosas de Plata	Best Actor	Tenoch Huerta	Nominated
55th Diosas de Plata	Best Supporting Actor	Marco Pérez	Nominated
55th Diosas de Plata	Best Supporting Actor	Noé Hernández	Nominated
55th Diosas de Plata	Best Editing	Jorge Macaya	Nominated
55th Diosas de Plata	Best Song	Enjambre – "El Ordinario"	Won
