= The Chosen Ones (2015 film) =

2015 film

- Film poster
- Directed by: David Pablos
- Release dates: 18 May 2015 (Cannes); 22 April 2016 (Mexico)
- Running time: 105 minutes
- Country: Mexico
- Language: Spanish

The Chosen Ones (Spanish: Las elegidas) is a 2015 Mexican drama film directed by David Pablos. It was screened in the Un Certain Regard section at the 2015 Cannes Film Festival. The film was named on the shortlist for Mexico's entry for the Academy Award for Best Foreign Language Film at the 89th Academy Awards.

== Plot ==
Ulysis and Sofia are in a relationship. It is revealed that Ulysis is being groomed by his family to entrap his lovers into the prostitution ring that forms his family's business. Having fallen for Sofia, his first lover, Ulysis puts up an unsuccessful fight to prevent her from being exploited. His father agrees to let Sofia free only when Ulysis gets another girl to replace her in the brothel. Thus he sets toward honeytrapping his next victim.

Meanwhile, Sofia is forced into sexual slavery and is losing hope after seeing that her possibility of escape is very slim. By chance she encounters a good samaritan pretending to be a client who plans to help her escape; but before she has a chance to act Ulysis arrives and takes Sofia away to live with him having forced another girl, Marta, to take her place.

Sofia is then forced by Ulysis's family to stay with him as her "saviour" and told that she will help care for the children of the house(some of whom are hostages because they are the children of other enslaved women) and she cannot see her family or she may be returned to the brothel. Sofia is traumatized by the horrific abuse she has endured and is not the same carefree girl that Ulysis remembers. She also realizes another girl has been trapped by Ulysis as her replacement and struggles with this thought. Ulysis seems to feel grief over what has happened but besides making her his in the eyes of his family makes no effort to free her. The film ends with Sofia and Ulysis on a deceptively normal outing with Ulysis's family; Sofia sits silently in fear across from Ulysis.

== Critical reception ==
The film was well received by critics. Review aggregator Rotten Tomatoes reports that 85% of 26 critics gave the film a positive review, for an average rating of 8/10.

== Awards and nominations ==
Award	Category	Nominee	Result
58th Ariel Awards
58th Ariel Awards	Best Art Direction	Daniela Schneider	Nominated
58th Ariel Awards	Best Cinematography	Carolina Costa	Won
58th Ariel Awards	Best Costume Design	Daniela Schneider	Nominated
58th Ariel Awards	Best Director	David Pablos	Won
58th Ariel Awards	Best Editing	Miguel Schverdfinger, Aina Calleja	Nominated
58th Ariel Awards	Best Make-Up	Nayeli Mora	Nominated
58th Ariel Awards	Best Original Score	Carlo Ayhllón	Nominated
58th Ariel Awards	Best Original Screenplay	David Pablos	Won
58th Ariel Awards	Best Picture	Las Elegidas	Won
58th Ariel Awards	Best Sound	Alejandro de Icaza, Pablo Tamez	Nominated
58th Ariel Awards	Best Supporting Actress	Alicia Quiñonez	Nominated
58th Ariel Awards	Breakthrough Male Performance	Óscar Torres	Nominated
58th Ariel Awards	Breakthrough Female Performance	Nancy Talamantes	Won
Cannes Film Festival	Un Certain Regard	David Pablos	Nominated
San Sebastián International Film Festival	Horizons Award	David Pablos	Nominated
Stockholm International Film Festival	Bronze Horse - Best Film	David Pablos	Nominated
Zurich Film Festival	Best International Feature Film	David Pablos	Nominated
