= 600 Miles =

2015 film

- Film poster
- Directed by: Gabriel Ripstein
- Written by: Gabriel Ripstein
- Starring: Tim Roth
- Distributed by: Videocine
- Release date: 6 February 2015 (Berlin)
- Running time: 85 minutes
- Country: Mexico
- Languages: Spanish; English

600 Miles (Spanish: 600 Millas) is a 2015 Mexican drama film directed by Gabriel Ripstein. It was screened in the Panorama section of the 65th Berlin International Film Festival where it won the award for Best First Feature. It was one of fourteen films shortlisted by Mexico to be their submission for the Academy Award for Best Foreign Language Film at the 88th Academy Awards. On 17 September 2015 it was selected to represent Mexico for the Foreign Language Oscar but it was not nominated.

== Plot ==
Arnulfo Rubio smuggles weapons for a Mexican cartel. He is using an American associate, who buys the weapons in the United States for him. During one of the weapons purchases, ATF agent Hank Harris attempts to apprehend Arnulfo, but is surprised and knocked out by Arnulfo's American partner, who flees the scene immediately. A panicked Arnulfo restrains the unconscious Hank and loads him into a secret compartment of his SUV, driving over the border into Mexico with him. There, he lets Hank sit on the backseat, still handcuffed, while he drives to his hometown.

During the drive, they get into a roadblock set up by a different cartel. They are almost killed by the enforcers when they notice that a handcuffed American is in the car, but Hank is able to negotiate free passage by mentioning the names of several cartel members and assuring that he is doing business with them.

While driving further, Hank and Arnulfo begin to talk to each other and get closer, with Hank mentioning that his wife has died from a stroke 6 months ago and that they were unable to have children.

When they arrive, Arnulfo takes Hank to his uncle, a cartel member, and tries to explain that Hank could be useful to them with his knowledge of cartel information. His uncle, furious because Arnulfo created trouble by bringing an American government employee to him, ignores his explanation. He demands that Arnulfo kill Hank. When Arnulfo cannot bring himself to do it, his uncle attempts to shoot Hank, only to be shot and killed himself at the last second by Arnulfo.

Hank and Arnulfo try to flee the country, with Hank calling some associates to arrange a safe extraction to the United States. They wait at the house of another of Arnulfo's uncles for Hank's associates. But the uncle secretly has alerted the cartel, who send enforcers to catch and/or kill both. Hank is able to flee the house while Arnulfo is caught. But Hank returns, shoots and kills the enforcers and flees with Arnulfo.

Somewhere in the desert in the border country between Mexico and the United States, Hank lets Arnulfo get out of the car and drives away, leaving Arnulfo surprised and confused.

The film ends with a domestic scene at Hank's home which shows that, in contrast to what he told Arnulfo, Hank's wife is still alive and it is implied that he has children.

== Cast ==
- Tim Roth as Hank Harris
- Kristyan Ferrer as Arnulfo Rubio
- Harrison Thomas as Carson
- Monica del Carmen as Mamá Rubio
- Julian Sedgwick as Ray Wilson
- Craig Hensley as Gunstore Owner 5 (as Craig Oldfather)
- Noé Hernández as Martín
- Greg Lutz as Willy
- Tad Sallee as Gun Show Exhibitor
- Harris Kendall as Greta

== Production ==
Ripstein produced the film with Mexican director Michel Franco. The screenplay, by Ripstein and Issa López, was inspired by the ATF gunwalking scandal. Ripstein wanted to focus the story on the two characters, rather than expanding it to include the cartel leaders. He attempted to express his view of guns "objectively, almost like a documentarian", since he had been exposed to guns from an early age; his grandfather took him and his brother shooting on weekends, and "my brother became an exceptional shot; they hunted ducks and my grandmother cooked them".

== Release ==
600 Miles premiered in the Panorama Section of the 65th Berlin International Film Festival, where it won the Best First Feature Film award (the second consecutive award for a Mexican film; Alonso Ruizpalacios' Güeros won the previous year). Ripstein dedicated the award to his son, "who will surely be the fourth generation of our family to make films because he loves it".

The film opened on 150 screens in Mexico on 4 December 2015, and was selected to represent the country at the 88th Academy Awards in the Best Foreign Language Film category. About the process of receiving an Academy Award nomination, Ripstein said: "Much lobbying is required; unfortunately, film quality is not always decisive". The nominees that year represented Colombia, France, Jordan, Denmark, and Hungary (the eventual winner).

== Reception ==
Review aggregator website Rotten Tomatoes reported a 93% approval rating based on 30 reviews, with a rating average of 7.7 out of 10.

According to Peter Debruge of Variety, "Ripstein allows long stretches to go by in near-silence, gradually letting the tension build as the SUV travels farther south, deeper into potentially dangerous territory". Andrew Pulver of The Guardian gave 600 Miles three stars out of five, praising Roth's performance and calling the film a "pretty enterprising movie, subtly constructing its power relationship while not losing its grip on the basic sense of tension".

== Awards and nominations ==
=== Ariel Awards ===
The Ariel Awards are awarded annually by the Mexican Academy of Film Arts and Sciences in Mexico. 600 Miles won two awards out of 13 nominations.

Year	Nominee / work	Award	Result
58th Ariel Awards	600 Miles	Best Picture	Nominated
58th Ariel Awards	Gabriel Ripstein	Best Direction	Nominated
58th Ariel Awards	Kristyan Ferrer	Best Actor	Nominated
58th Ariel Awards	Tim Roth	Best Actor	Nominated
58th Ariel Awards	Noé Hernández	Best Supporting Actor	Won
58th Ariel Awards	Carlos Jacques	Best Art Direction	Nominated
58th Ariel Awards	Gabriel Ripstein, Santiago Pérez Rocha	Best Editing	Nominated
58th Ariel Awards	Alejandro Vázquez	Best Special Effects	Nominated
58th Ariel Awards	Edgardo Mejía	Best Visual Effects	Nominated
58th Ariel Awards	Alejandro de Icaza, Federico González Jordán	Best Sound	Nominated
58th Ariel Awards	Gabriel Ripstein, Issa López	Best Original Screenplay	Nominated
58th Ariel Awards	Thal Echeveste	Best Make-Up	Nominated
58th Ariel Awards	Gabriel Ripstein	Best First Feature Film	Won

=== Diosas de Plata ===
The Diosas de Plata are awarded annually by the Cinematographic Journalists Guild in Mexico (PECIME). 600 Miles received two awards out of six nominations.

Year	Nominee / work	Award	Result
45th Diosas de Plata	600 Miles	Best Picture	Nominated
45th Diosas de Plata	Gabriel Ripstein	Best Director	Nominated
45th Diosas de Plata	Kristyan Ferrer	Best Actor	Won
45th Diosas de Plata	Gabriel Ripstein, Issa López	Best Screenplay	Nominated
45th Diosas de Plata	Santiago Pérez Rocha, Gabriel Ripstein	Best Editing	Nominated
45th Diosas de Plata	Gabriel Ripstein	Best First Feature Film	Won

== See also ==
- List of submissions to the 88th Academy Awards for Best Foreign Language Film
- List of Mexican submissions for the Academy Award for Best Foreign Language Film
