= El Jeremías =

- Film poster
- Directed by: Anwar Safa
- Screenplay by: Ana Sofía Clerici
- Produced by: Tita Lombardo; Mónica Lozano; Alejandro Safa; Anwar Safa
- Starring: Martín Castro; Karem Momo
- Cinematography: Marc Beliver
- Edited by: Francisco Rivera
- Music by: Camilo Froideval
- Production companies: Terregal; Alebrije
- Distributed by: Sony Pictures Releasing International
- Release dates: 8 March 2015 (Guadalajara International Film Festival); 28 October 2016 (Mexico)
- Running time: 95 minutes
- Country: Mexico
- Language: Spanish

El Jeremías is a 2015 Mexican comedy film, directed by Anwar Safa. The film stars Martín Castro as Jeremías, a bright child, who after learning he's a genius, struggles to succeed because of his family's poverty and ignorance.

The film premiered at the 30th Guadalajara International Film Festival. The film also received nine nominations at the 58th Ariel Awards including Best Director for Safa and Best Original Screenplay for Ana Sofía Clerici. The film was named on the shortlist for Mexico's entry for the Academy Award for Best Foreign Language Film at the 89th Academy Awards. The film was released in the United States on 21 October 2016.

== Synopsis ==
Set in Sonora, Mexico, the film tells the story of Jeremías (Martin Castro) an eight year old who finds out he is a gifted child and initiates a journey of self discovery. When an opportunistic psychologist makes contact with Jeremías, a new world of experiences open up to him but at the expense of being away from the family he loves. Jeremías must choose between this exciting but lonely new world he finds himself in or returning home to his loving family.

== Cast ==
- Martín Castro as Jeremías Gómez
- Karem Momo as Margarita Sánchez
- Paulo Galindo as Onésimo
- Isela Vega as Herminia
- Marcela Sotomayor as Audelia
- Daniel Giménez Cacho as Dr. Federico Forni
- Eduardo MacGregor as Don Gelipe
- Jesús Ochoa as Don Enrique
- Gabriela Roel as Dra. Soto
- Juan Manuel Bernal as Ricardo Lecanda
- Gerardo Diego as Raúl
- Álvaro Peralta as Tomás
- Irvin Gonzalez as Primo 2
- Marcos Flores as Chamuco
- Luna Audrey Martínez Castillo as Little Jeremías

== Awards and nominations ==
Award	Nominee	Result	
58th Ariel Awards	Best Director	Anwar Safa	Nominated
58th Ariel Awards	Best First Feature Film	Anwar Safa	Nominated
58th Ariel Awards	Best Supporting Actress	Isela Vega	Nominated
58th Ariel Awards	Breakthrough Male Performance	Martín Castro	Won
58th Ariel Awards	Breakthrough Female Performance	Karem Momo	Nominated
58th Ariel Awards	Best Original Screenplay	Ana Sofía Clerici	Nominated
58th Ariel Awards	Best Art Direction	Bárbara Enríquez	Nominated
58th Ariel Awards	Best Makeup	Nayeli Mora	Nominated
58th Ariel Awards	Best Visual Effects	Raúl Prado, Edgar Piña and Juan Carlos Lepe	Nominated
