= Juan Manuel Bernal =

Mexican actor (born 1967)

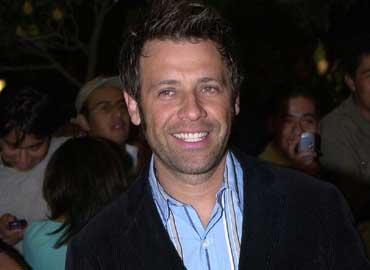
- Born: Juan Manuel Bernal Chávez; December 22, 1967 (age 57); Mexico City, Distrito Federal, Mexico
- Occupation: Actor
- Years active: 1987-present
- Partner: Miguel Ángel Loyo (2011-present)
- Parent: Graciela Chávez Cárdenas (mother)

Juan Manuel Bernal Chávez (born December 22, 1967) is a Mexican actor.

== Filmography ==
=== Films ===
Year	Title	Role	Notes
1987	Muerte súbita		Short film
1993	Letras capitales		Short film
1994	Tiempo cautivo		Short film
1994	Hasta morir	El Boy	
1995	El Callejón de los Milagros	Chava	
1995	En cualquier parte del mundo		
1995	El plato fuerte		Short film
1997	El futuro es ahora		Short film
1997	Alta tensión		Short film
1997	Una para llevar	Pickpocket	Short film
1997	Desencuentro	Sergio	Short film
1998	Cilantro y perejil	Jorge	
1999	No existen diferencias	Tomás	Short film
2000	Sin Dejar Huella	El Primo	
2002	Demasiado amor	Golpeador	
2002	La habitación azul	Antonio	
2003	El espejo	Fabián	Short film
2003	Sin ton ni Sonia	Orlando	
2004	Blueberry, la experiencia secreta	Jeremy	
2004	Medalla al empeño	Employee	Short film
2004	Motel	Alejandro Mora	Short film
2005	Esperanza		Television film
2006	Tired of Kissing Frogs	Roberto	
2006	Infierno grande		Short film
2007	Gente bien... atascada		Short film
2007	Vacaciones navideñas		Television film
2008	High School Musical: El Desafío	Cristobal's father	
2010	Chicogrande	Médico Gringo	
2011	Asalto al cine	Manager	
2011	Más allá del muro		
2012	The Fantastic World of Juan Orol	Kodak salesman	
2013	Tlatelolco, Verano de 68	Ernesto	
2013	Yo descubrí Yucatán		Short film
2014	Cuatro lunas	Héctor	
2014	Perfect Obedience	Ángel de la Cruz	
2015	El Jeremías	Ricardo Lecanda	
2015	Refugio	Óscar	
2019	Sonora	Sánchez	

=== Television ===
Year	Title	Role	Notes
1994	Más allá del puente	Chinino	Supporting role
1995	Alondra	Rigoberto Escobar	
1995	Lazos de Amor	Gerardo Sandoval	
1996	Te sigo amando	Alberto	
1996-97	Mujer, casos de la vida real	Various roles	Episodes: "El amor siempre es el mismo", "Un problema para dos", "Un caso más", "El juramento"
1997	Desencuentro	Sergio	
1998	Tentaciones	Diego Segovia	
1999	Romántica obsesión	Alejandro	
1999	El candidato	Jerónimo Manrique	
2000	La calle de las novias	Román Mendoza	
2001	Amores querer con alevosía	Mario Rodríguez	
2003	Mirada de mujer, el regreso	Unknown role	
2004	La heredera	Dionisio	
2008	Secretos del alma	Carlos Lascuráin	
2008	Cambio de vida	Unknown role	Episode: "Siempre amigos"
2008	Noche eterna	Ariel	
2008-12	Capadocia	Federico Márquez	37 episodes
2011	Bajo el alma	Armando Bravo	
2011	A corazón abierto	Santiago Sánchez	
2012	Amor cautivo	Nicolás Santacruz	
2013	Vivir a destiempo	Patricio Delgado	
2015	Así en el barrio como en el cielo	Jesús El Gallo	

== Awards and nominations ==
Year	Award	Category	Nominated work	Result
2013	Festival de Televisión de Monte Carlo	Best Actor	Capadocia	Nominated
2015	Ariel Awards	Best Actor	Obediencia perfecta	Won
2015	Diosas de Plata	Best Actor	Obediencia perfecta	Nominated
