= David Pablos =

Mexican director and editor

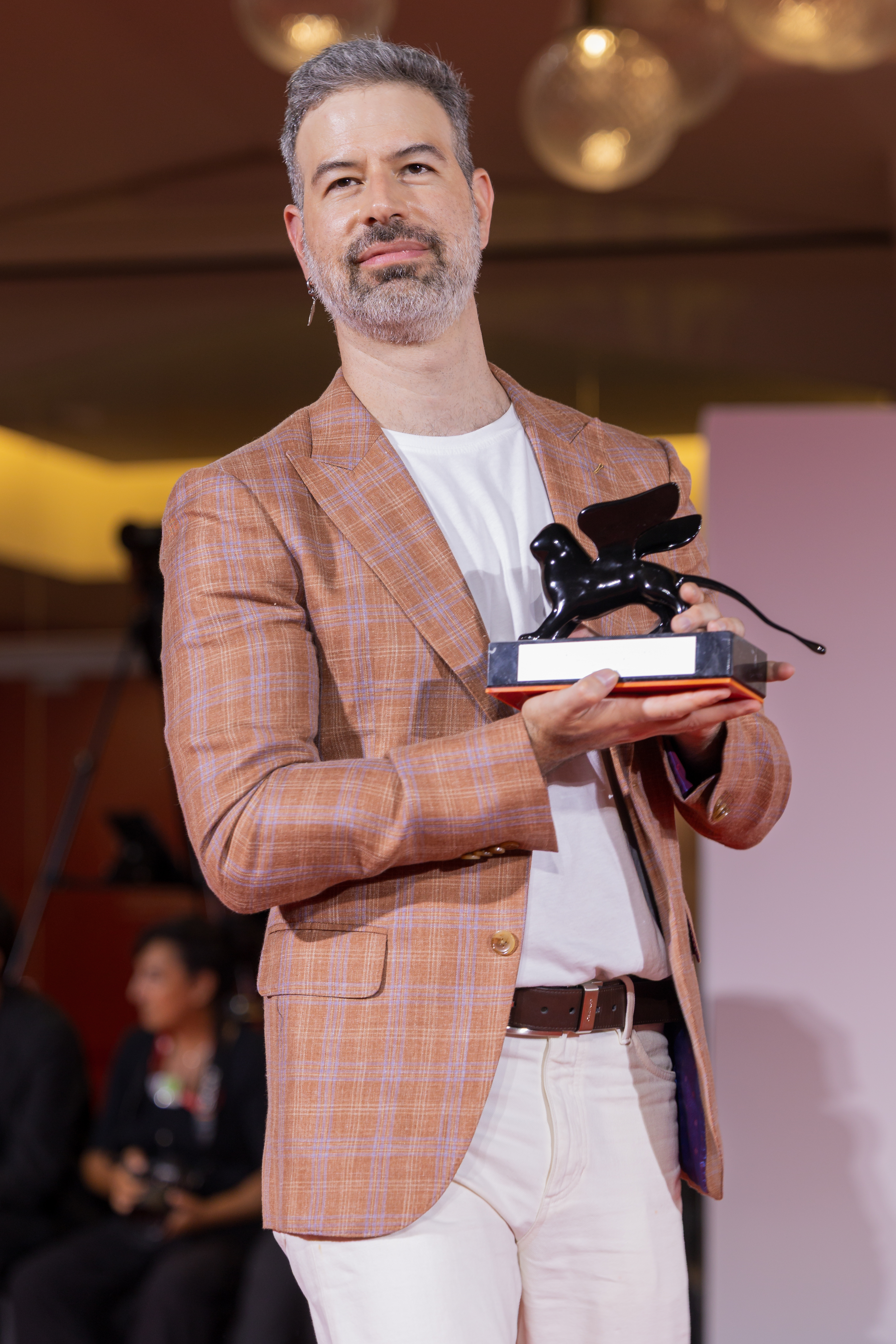
- Pablos in 2025
- Born: July 28, 1982 (age 44); Tijuana, Baja California, Mexico
- Education: Centro de Capacitación Cinematográfica
- Occupations: Director, editor, screenwriter
- Years active: 2007–present

David Pablos (born July 28, 1982) is a Mexican director, editor and screenwriter. An active filmmaker since 2007, Pablos has been involved in seven films, including shorts and documentaries. Pablos attained recognition for directing La Vida Después (2013) and Las Elegidas (2015).

Pablos has worked with non-professional actors on his narrative films, for which he has received awards at several international film festivals, including the Morelia International Film Festival and Cannes Film Festival. Pablos received an Ariel Award for Best Short Fiction Film in 2010 for La Canción de los Niños Muertos and in 2016, won for Best Director and Best Original Screenplay at the 58th Ariel Awards in Mexico for his work in the film Las Elegidas.

== Early life and background ==
Pablos was born in Tijuana, Baja California, Mexico and studied filmmaking at the Centro de Capacitación Cinematográfica (CCC) in Mexico City. Pablos also received a scholarship granted by the National Fund for Culture and Arts (FONCA) to specialize in screenwriting. Pablos is openly gay.

== Film career ==
The type of films I like are the ones on which the filmmakers have their own voice and take risks, using the camera as an expansive tool, I think the camera should take the intent of the scene and I like to put a camera where it can tell you more about what happens and is not limited to display it. I am very attached to the composition, with the frames, I'm very obsessive on that part, because to me everything has to do with emotion, because it is what dictates the planes and everything.

— David Pablos, Encuadres.

Pablos earned his academic degree from the CCC with the short film La Canción de los Niños Muertos in 2008. The film about five teenagers who lose their mother, starring Sebastián Aguirre and Rodrigo Azuela, won for Best Fiction Short Film at the Morelia International Film Festival and was screened during the Critics' Week of the 2009 Cannes Film Festival. For this work, Pablos earned the Ariel Award for Best Live Action Short and also the SIGNIS Award during the 4th International Short Film Festival (FICMEX), being the SIGNIS jury's verdict that "the film narrative takes us into the complexity of disparate feelings as violence and tenderness, anger and forgiveness, rebellion and reconciliation." After directing the documentaries La Escritura en la Pared and Una Frontera, Todas las Fronteras (2010), Pablos premiered in 2013 his first feature film, La Vida Después, also starring Azuela, Américo Hollander and María Renée Prudencio. The film, about two brothers searching for their stranged mother, received the Klic Award granted by the Mexican movie theater chain Cinépolis during the Morelia Film Festival. La Vida Después was the only Mexican film screened during the 70th Venice International Film Festival and according to Pablos is about "living in the same roof with a complete stranger, although that is your family... it has to do with the lack of communication". About the thematic similarities between his first short film and his first feature film, Pablos stated to magazine Encuadres:

"I knew that I was interested in keep talking about family, namely, about brotherhood, but in the process I discovered what was the true essence of this film [La Vida Después], which is about family heritage emotionally more than physically and how your children refuse to follow the footsteps of their parents because often there is a kind of chain that is impossible to break and this generates feelings of frustration and rejection. My question was whether the chain can be broken or not, and what the consequences are and what involves the separation of the family that ["the mother"] loves." —David Pablos

Pablos directed 20 y Más por el Arte, a TV series created to celebrate Canal 22's 20th Anniversary in 2013. The series followed 20 FONCA beneficiaries through their daily life and creative processes. In 2014, the film Las Tinieblas, co-written by Pablos and director Daniel Castro Zimbrón, was shown included on the Cinéfondation official selection during the 2014 Cannes Film Festival. Later that year, after an exhaustive casting process, Pablos filmed Las Elegidas in Tijuana with non-professional actors. The film was originally based on a book written by Mexican novelist Jorge Volpi from which Pablos developed a screenplay that features a love story that evolves in a complaint about kidnapping, white slave traffic and prostitution, with a "documentary tone". Las Elegidas competed at the Un Certain Regard section of the 2015 Cannes Film Festival and later premiered at the Morelia International Film Festival. Sight & Sound magazine ranked the film at number 118 of their list for the Best Films of 2015. In 2016, Las Elegidas received 13 nominations for the 58th Ariel Awards and won five awards, including Best Picture, and Best Director and Best Original Screenplay for Pablos. The film opened theatrically in Mexico on 14 theaters, which according to Pablos was "poor", and a week later was streamed internationally by Netflix. Thanks to this distribution deal, Pablos was contacted by British band White Lies to hire him to direct a music video for the track "Take It Out On Me", the lead single of their album Friends (2016), after Harry McVeigh, lead singer of the band, watched Las Elegidas. In 2016, Pablos worked on the film adaptation of the novel Los Detectives Salvajes written by Chilean author Roberto Bolaño.

== Filmography ==
=== Feature films ===
- The Life After (La vida después) - 2013
- The Chosen Ones (Las elegidas) - 2015
- Dance of the 41 (El baile de los 41) - 2020
- On the Road (En el camino) - 2025

=== Documentaries ===
- La Escritura en la Pared (2010)
- Una Frontera, Todas las Fronteras (2010)

=== Short films ===
- La Canción de los Niños Muertos (2008)
