= Barrie M. Osborne =

American film producer

Barrie M. Osborne ONZM
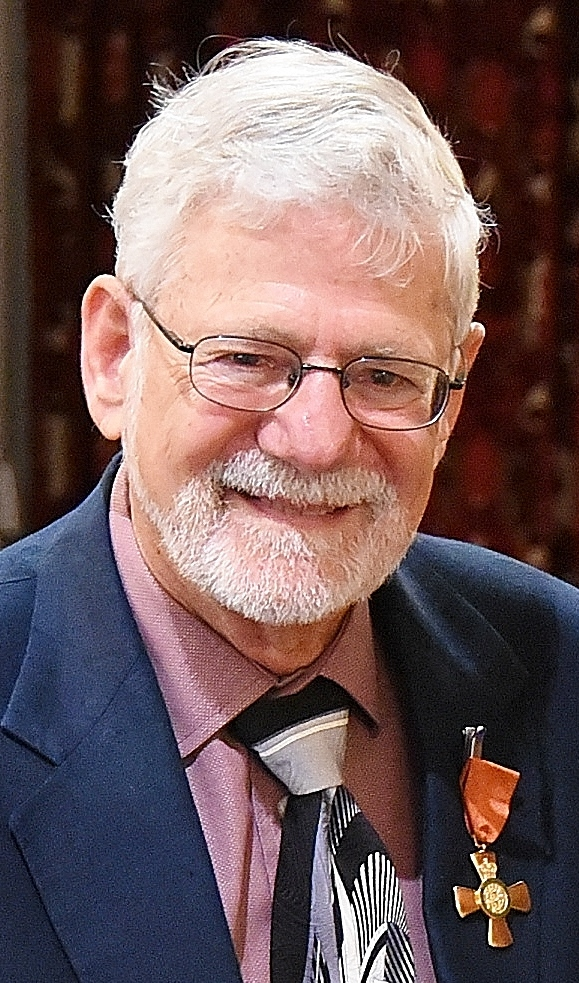
- Osborne in 2017
- Born: February 7, 1944 (age 82); New York City, New York, United States
- Occupation: Film producer
- Years active: 1976–present
- Relatives: Larry Osborne (brother)
- Awards: Academy Award for Best Picture; 2003 The Lord of the Rings: The Return of the King; BAFTA Award for Best Film; 2001 The Lord of the Rings: The Fellowship of the Ring; 2003 The Lord of the Rings: The Return of the King; AFI Awards Best Foreign Film; 2001 The Lord of the Rings: The Fellowship of the Ring; 2002 The Lord of the Rings: The Two Towers; 2003 The Lord of the Rings: The Return of the King

Barrie Mitchell Osborne ONZM (born February 7, 1944) is an American film producer, production manager and director.

Barrie M. Osborne is best known for his work on Peter Jackson's Middle-earth film trilogy, The Lord of the Rings (2001–2003).

== Biography ==
The son of Hertha Schwarz and William Osborne, Barrie was born in New York City and grew up in New Rochelle, New York where he graduated New Rochelle High School. He is an alumnus of Carleton College in Northfield, Minnesota and currently lives in Wellington, New Zealand. He was appointed an Officer of the New Zealand Order of Merit (ONZM), for services to the film industry, in the 2017 New Year Honours.

Barrie M. Osborne's most notable work is Peter Jackson's Middle-earth film trilogy, The Lord of the Rings (2001–2003), for the third film of which, The Return of the King, Osborne, Peter Jackson, and Fran Walsh received the Academy Award for Best Picture. He also produced the 2013 The Great Gatsby remake, starring Leonardo DiCaprio.

In 2014, Osborne, Alan B. Curtiss, and Mexican entrepreneur Max Appedole, released Gloria, a biopic of controversial Mexican pop star Gloria Trevi, directed by Christian Keller.

Osborne is also preparing a possible movie trilogy about the Viking king Harald Hardrada.

== Filmography ==
=== Producer ===
- Kojak (1973) (unit manager)
- Apocalypse Now (1979) (production manager) - as Barry Osborne
- Cutter's Way (1981) (associate producer/unit production manager)
- The Big Chill (1983) (associate producer/unit production manager) - as Barrie Osborne
- Octopussy (1983) (production manager)
- The Cotton Club (1984) (line producer)
- Fandango (1985) (associate producer/unit production manager)
- Peggy Sue Got Married (1986) (executive producer/unit production manager)
- Child's Play (1988) (executive producer)
- Dick Tracy (1990) (executive producer)
- Child's Play (1992) (executive producer)
- Wilder Napalm (1993) (executive producer/unit production manager)
- Rapa-Nui (1994) (executive producer)
- China Moon (1994) (producer)
- The Fan (1996) (executive producer)
- Face/Off (1997) (producer)
- The Matrix (1999) (executive producer)
- The Lord of the Rings: The Fellowship of the Ring (2001) (producer)
- The Last Place on Earth (2002) (producer)
- The Lord of the Rings: The Two Towers (2002) (producer)
- The Long and Short of It (2003) (executive in charge of production)
- The Lord of the Rings: The Return of the King (2003) (producer)
- Little Fish (2005) (executive producer)
- The Water Horse: Legend of the Deep (2007) (producer)
- The Warrior's Way (2010) (producer)
- The Great Gatsby (2013) (executive producer)
- Pete's Dragon (2016) (executive producer)
- The Meg (2018) (executive producer)
- Mulan (2020) (executive producer)
- Megalopolis (2024) (executive producer)

=== Other ===
- American Hot Wax (1978) (second assistant director)
- The China Syndrome (1979) (second assistant director)
- Dick Tracy (1990) (second unit director)
- The Lord of the Rings: The Fellowship of the Ring (2001) (additional second unit director)
