= The Thin Yellow Line =

2015 film

- Film poster
- Directed by: Celso R. García
- Written by: Celso R. García
- Produced by: Bertha Navarro; Alejandro Springall; Guillermo del Toro
- Starring: Damián Alcázar; Joaquín Cosío; Silverio Palacios; Gustavo Sánchez Parra; Américo Hollander; Fernando Becerril
- Cinematography: Emiliano Villanueva
- Edited by: Jorge García
- Music by: Dan Zlotnik
- Production company: Springall Pictures
- Release date: 6 March 2015 (Guadalajara Film Festival)
- Running time: 95 minutes
- Country: Mexico
- Language: Spanish

The Thin Yellow Line (Spanish: La delgada línea amarilla) is a 2015 Mexican road comedy-drama film directed by Celso R. García. It was one of fourteen films shortlisted by Mexico to be their submission for the Academy Award for Best Foreign Language Film at the 88th Academy Awards, but it lost out to 600 Miles.

== Plot ==
Five men are hired to paint the yellow center line of a highway linking two Mexican cities. They have to complete more than 200 kilometers in less than 15 days. All five are lonely men and have met by chance on this construction site. They face challenges that will change their lives forever.

== Cast ==
- Damián Alcázar as Toño
- Joaquín Cosio as Gabriel
- Silverio Palacios as Atayde
- Gustavo Sánchez Parra as Mario
- Américo Hollander as Pablo
- Fernando Becerril as Ingeniero

== Reception ==
On review aggregator website Rotten Tomatoes, the film holds an approval rating of 91%, based on 11 reviews, and an average rating of 6.5/10.
