= Capadocia (TV series) =

- Capadocia: Un Lugar sin Perdón
- Genre: Drama
- Created by: Argos Producciones
- Written by: Laura Sosa; Leticia López Margalli; Guillermo Ríos; Joaquín Guerrero Casasola; Carmen Madrid
- Directed by: Javier Patrón; Carlos Carrera; Pitipol Ybarra
- Starring: Ana de la Reguera; Alejandro Camacho; Juan Manuel Bernal; Dolores Heredia; Héctor Arredondo; Cecilia Suárez; Cristina Umaña; Marco Treviño
- Country of origin: Mexico
- Original language: Spanish
- No. of seasons: 3
- No. of episodes: 39

Production
- Executive producers: Luis F. Peraza; Epigmenio Ibarra; Verónica Velasco
- Production locations: Mexico City, Mexico
- Running time: 50-60 minutes
- Production company: HBO Latin America - Argos Producciones

Original release
- Network: HBO
- Release: 2 March 2008 – 16 December 2012

Capadocia: Un Lugar Sin Perdón ("Cappadocia: A Place Without Pardon") is a Mexican HBO Latin America television series. It started on March 2, 2008, and ran for 3 seasons.

== Plot ==
The show tells the stories of several women imprisoned for different reasons in an experimental penal complex in Mexico City.

== Cast ==
=== Main cast ===
Actor	Character	Description
Ana de la Reguera	Lorena Guerra	Inmate
Dolores Heredia	Teresa Lagos	Prison governor, later Inmate
Juan Manuel Bernal	Federico Márquez	Exxo worker
Cecilia Suárez	Aurelia Sosa 'La Bambi' (Season 1); Valeria Molina (Season 2-3)	Inmate; Prison psychologist, later Prison governor
Marco Treviño	Santiago Marín	Mexico DF's governor
Cristina Umaña	Consuelo Ospino 'La Colombiana'	Inmate (The Colombian Girl)
Enrique Singer	Cristóbal Sáenz	
Silvia Carusillo	Isabel Clave	
Aida López	Ana Moreno 'La Negra'	The Black Woman, a corrections officer, later Inmate
Luisa Huertas	Magos	Inmate
Héctor Arredondo	Patrick Lanz Cardoso	Lorena's husband
Dolores Paradis	Andrea Marin (Season 1)	Santiago and Teresa's daughter, Inmate
Camila Ibarra	Ruth Marin	Santiago and Teresa's daughter
Rodrigo de la Rosa	Daniel	Teresa's university pupil
Gustavo Sanchez Parra	Victor Hernández	
Álvaro Guerrero	Álvaro Fernández del Rea	
Marco Pérez	Emiliano Treviño	
Eréndira Ibarra	Sofía López	Inmate
Óscar Olivares	Antonia	an MTF transsexual, Inmate
Paulina Gaitán	Andrea Marin (Season 2)	Santiago and Teresa's daughter, Inmate
Sara Maldonado	Monserrat 'Monse' Olmos	Inmate
Gabriela de la Garza	Italia Meneses (season 3)	Agent, Inmate
Marina de Tavira	Blanca	
Ximena Ayala	Janette María	Inmate
Saúl Lisazo	Javier	
Verónica Falcón	Cayetana, custodia (Season 3)	
Marius Biegai	Dr. Hiram Alos (Season 3)	Prison psychologist, later Prison governor
Jorge Eduardo García	Juli	
Alejandro Camacho	Jose Burian	Prison psychologist

=== Supporting cast ===
Actor	Character	Description
Adriana Paz	Ramona	
Alejandra de la Mora	Vanessa	
Alejandra Maldonado		
Alejandro Calva	Gerardo	
Alicia Zapien		
Ana Karina Guevara		
Andrés Palacios		
Ángeles Cruz	Fernanda Castrejón	
Ángeles Marin	Rosario	
Ari Brickman		
Arturo Barba	Garces	
Arturo Beristain		
Carlos Álvarez	Ramiro Santos	
Carlos Corona	Ochoa	
Claudia Frias	Dominga	
Claudette Maillé	Mónica	
Claudio Lafarga	Miguel	
Gabriela Roel	Zaide Luján	Inmate
Eileen Yañez	Sandra	Inmate
Elizabeth Cervantes	Gaby	
Erick Hayser	Andres	
Enrique Muñoz	Obispo Indalecio Quiroz	
Erika Llave	Carola	
Ernesto Gómez Cruz	Fernando Miranda	
German Valdez	Bobby	
Guillermo Quintanilla		
Irela de Villers		
Irene Azuela	Azucena Montiel	Inmate
Isabella Camil	Grace Ferreira	
Iván Cortes	Omar	
Jimena Sánchez	Mayte Cedeño	
Joaquín Cosío	Joaquin	Husband of Magos
Jorge Zárate		
Juan Ignacio Aranda	Flavio	
Lisa Owen	Adriana	Inmate
Lourdes Reyes	Nuria Arjona	Inmate
Luciana Silveyra	Marla	
Luis Cardenas	Alejandro	
Luis Gerardo Méndez		
Magali Boysselle	Paola Caseres	Inmate
Mar Saura	Julieta Pusch	Inmate
Margarita Rosa de Francisco	Mercedes Mejía 'Esmeraldera'	Smuggler, Inmate
María del Carmen Farias	Marion	Inmate
Marimar Vega	Gala	Inmate
Mario Zaragoza	Benjamin	
Martín Navarrete	Abelardo Canton	
Miguel Ángel Muñoz	Héctor Bolaños	
Mitzi Mabel Cadena	Adela Rosa Chávez	Inmate
Moises Arizmendi		
Nailea Norvind	Diane Brighton	Inmate
Octavio Castro	Quique	Son of Elsa
Paloma Woolrich	Elba	Inmate
Patricia Llaca	Brenda Yamilet	Singer, Inmate
René García		Lawyer de Monse
Roberto Sosa		
Rodrigo Abed	Felipe	
Rodrigo Cuevas		
Roger Cudney	James Medina	
Rubén Zamora	Aldo	
Salvador Zerboni	Jordi	
Tony Dalton	Augusto Mateos	
Wendy de los Cobos	Lina Herran	
Yolanda Abud		

== Episode ==
=== Series overview ===
Series	Episodes	Originally released	
Series	Episodes	First released	Last released
1	13	2 March 2008	25 May 2008
2	13	19 September 2010	12 December 2010
3	13	23 September 2012	16 December 2012

=== Season 1 (2008) ===
No. overall	No. in season	Title	Directed by	Written by	Original release date
1	1	"Génesis"	Javier Patrón	Leticia López Margalli & Guillermo Ríos	2 March 2008
2	2	"Éxodo"	Javier Patrón	Leticia López Margalli & Guillermo Ríos	9 March 2008
3	3	"El sacrificio"	Carlos Carrera	Carmen Madrid	16 March 2008
4	4	"Mater dolorosa"	Carlos Carrera	Silvia Pasternac & Laura Sosa	23 March 2008
5	5	"Hijo pródigo"	Pedro Pablo Ibarra	Guillermo Ríos	30 March 2008
6	6	"El ángel caído"	Pedro Pablo Ibarra	Silvia Pasternac & Guillermo Ríos	6 April 2008
7	7	"Pecado capital"	Javier Patrón	Silvia Pasternac	13 April 2008
8	8	"Justos por pecadores"	Carlos Carrera	Carmen Madrid	20 April 2008
9	9	"El buen samaritano"	Carlos Carrera	Guillermo Ríos	27 April 2008
10	10	"María Magdalena"	Pedro Pablo Ibarra	Carmen Madrid	4 May 2008
11	11	"La elegida"	Pedro Pablo Ibarra	Leticia López Margalli & Guillermo Ríos	11 May 2008
12	12	"Perdona nuestras ofensas"	Pedro Pablo Ibarra	Carmen Madrid & Guillermo Ríos	18 May 2008
13	13	"Paraíso perdido"	Javier Patrón	Guillermo Ríos	25 May 2008

=== Season 2 (2010) ===
No. overall	No. in season	Title	Directed by	Written by	Original release date
14	1	"Lo que une dios"	Pedro Pablo Ibarra	Guillermo Ríos	19 September 2010
15	2	"Cordero de Dios"	Pedro Pablo Ibarra	Laura Sosa	26 September 2010
16	3	"Aparta de mí éste cáliz"	Pedro Pablo Ibarra	Carmen Madrid	3 October 2010
17	4	"El ojo de Dios"	Javier Patrón	Joaquín Guerrero Casasola	10 October 2010
18	5	"Amad a vuestros enemigos"	Javier Patrón	Carmen Madrid	17 October 2010
19	6	"Bienaventurados los inocentes"	Javier Patrón	Laura Sosa	24 October 2010
20	7	"Señor, ¿por qué me has abandonado?"	Javier Patrón	Joaquín Guerrero Casasola	31 October 2010
21	8	"Expiación"	Javier Patrón	Joaquín Guerrero Casasola	7 November 2010
22	9	"La mujer de Lot"	Pedro Pablo Ibarra	Laura Sosa	10 November 2010
23	10	"La sal de la tierra"	Moisés Ortiz Urquidi	Carmen Madrid	21 November 2010
24	11	"Y resucitó al tercer día"	Moisés Ortiz Urquidi	Leticia López Margalli & Guillermo Ríos	28 November 2010
25	12	"La tercera parte del mar se convirtió en sangre"	Carlos Carrera	Leticia López Margalli & Guillermo Ríos	5 December 2010
26	13	"Y llorarán su muerte todas las naciones"	Carlos Carrera	Leticia López Margalli & Guillermo Ríos	12 December 2010

=== Season 3 (2012) ===
No. overall	No. in season	Title	Directed by	Written by	Original release date
27	1	"Un gran lamento"	Pedro Pablo Ibarra	Luis Miguel Martínez & Guillermo Ríos	23 September 2012
28	2	"El fruto de tu vientre"	Pedro Pablo Ibarra	Luis Miguel Martínez & Guillermo Ríos	30 September 2012
29	3	"Aceite de la Uncion"	Javier Patrón	Joaquín Guerrero Casasola & Luis Miguel Martínez	7 October 2012
30	4	"Los escogidos"	Javier Patrón	Joaquín Guerrero Casasola & Luis Miguel Martínez	14 October 2012
31	5	"Destruye, Lo que te duele mátalo"	Moisés Ortiz Urquidi	Carmen Madrid & Luis Miguel Martínez	21 October 2012
32	6	"Las Vertientes de la salvación"	Javier Patrón	Leticia López Margalli & Luis Miguel Martínez	28 October 2012
33	7	"El Justo"	Moisés Ortiz Urquidi	Leticia López Margalli & Luis Miguel Martínez	4 November 2012
34	8	"El ángel del abismo"	Pedro Pablo Ibarra	Luis Miguel Martínez & Guillermo Ríos	11 November 2012
35	9	"Ovejas y Lobos"	Carlos Carrera	Leticia López Margalli & Luis Miguel Martínez	18 November 2012
36	10	"La sombra de tus alas"	Carlos Carrera	Leticia López Margalli & Luis Miguel Martínez	25 November 2012
37	11	"La paz y la espada"	Javier Patrón	Luis Miguel Martínez & Guillermo Ríos	2 December 2012
38	12	"Sangre de inocentes"	Pedro Pablo Ibarra	Leticia López Margalli & Luis Miguel Martínez	9 December 2012
39	13	"Apocalipsis"	Pedro Pablo Ibarra	Luis Miguel Martínez & Laura Sosa	16 December 2012

== See also ==
- Bad Girls (1999)
- Wentworth (2013)
