= A Monster with a Thousand Heads =

- Mexican theatrical release poster
- Directed by: Rodrigo Plá
- Screenplay by: Laura Santullo (based on her novel, Un Monstruo de Mil Cabezas)
- Produced by: Rodrigo Plá; Sandino Saravia Vinay; Matthias Ehrenberg (executive producer)
- Starring: Jana Raluy
- Cinematography: Odei Zabaleta
- Edited by: Miguel Schverdfinger
- Music by: Leonardo Heiblum; Jacobo Lieberman
- Production company: Buenaventura
- Distributed by: Memento Films; Canibal Networks; Music Box Films
- Release date: September 2, 2015 (Venice Film Festival)
- Running time: 75 minutes
- Country: Mexico
- Language: Spanish

A Monster with a Thousand Heads (Spanish: Un Monstruo de Mil Cabezas) is a 2015 Mexican thriller film, directed and produced by Rodrigo Plá and written by Laura Santullo. The film stars Jana Raluy, as a wife desperate to beat the bureaucracy, when her insurance company refuses to approve the care her husband needs to survive.

A Monster with a Thousand Heads premiered at the 72nd Venice Film Festival as the opening film of the Orizzonti section. The film also received seven nominations for the Ariel Awards in Mexico, including Best Picture, Best Direction and Best Actress, winning one for Best Adapted Screenplay. The film was named on the shortlist for Mexico's entry for the Academy Award for Best Foreign Language Film at the 89th Academy Awards, but it was not selected.

== Plot ==
Sonia Bonet (Jana Raluy) tries to take justice into her own hands after a health-insurance company named Alta Salud refuses to approve the care of her dying spouse. She and her son Dario (Sebastián Aguirre) attempt to fight the system, forcing the company employees to perform the corresponding procedure.

== Cast ==
- Jana Raluy as Sonia Bonet
- Sebastián Aguirre as Dario
- Emilio Echevarría as Enrique Sandoval Núñez
- Hugo Albores as Dr. Villalba
- Daniel Giménez Cacho as Nicolás Pietro
- Daniel Cubillo as Memo (Sonia's husband)
- Veronica Falcón as Lorena Morgan
- Úrsula Pruneda as Mónica
- Noé Hernández as Doorman
- Harold Torres as Police Agent 1
- Marisol Centeno as Lorena Morgan's assistant
- Iván Cortes as Man in robe
- Tenoch Huerta Mejía as Prosecutor (voice)

== Production ==
A Monster with a Thousand Heads is the fourth feature film from Uruguayan-Mexican director Rodrigo Plá, following La Zona (2007), Desierto Adentro (2008) and La Demora (2012). The screenplay was written by Laura Santullo, based on her novel of the same title. The main actors, Jana Raluy and Sebastian Aguirre, recreate "desperate characters" without exaggerated gestures and postures, "enhancing their work", according to Columba Vértiz de la Fuente of Proceso. The actors read the novel beforehand and rehearsed many times before shooting. Raluy stated that her father died of cancer shortly before the filming started, and that helped her to create her character. About the storyline, screenwriter Santullo exposed that they [Plá and herself] tried to make "an honest movie about the things we think and the concerns we have. So we talk about public and private health, a topic very delicate in the country and the world."

== Reception ==
=== Critical response ===
The film was the opening film of the Orizzonti section at the 72nd Venice Film Festival. After this premiere, Boyd van Hoeij of The Hollywood Reporter wrote on his review that the film is "a lean and efficient mix of thriller, drama and socio-political commentary", and also praised the leading work of actress Jana Raluy, stating that she "displays the right mix of craziness and steamrolling strength to appear dangerous, even though the awkward way she holds a gun clearly indicates she's a fed-up hausfrau reduced to desperate measures, not a trained killer." The reviewer commented on director Rodrigo Plá and cinematographer Obei Zabaleta, who "use their widescreen canvas beautifully". José Luis García of Cinestel said that the film has "certain moments of black humor that help lighten the dramatic burden of social criticism". The Mexican premiere of the film was held at the 13th Morelia International Film Festival on October 24, 2015, and by participating in this festival, the Mexican Academy of Film Arts and Sciences was able to nominate it for seven categories at the Ariel Awards of 2016, including Best Director, Best Screenplay, Best Actress and Best Picture.

=== Awards and nominations ===
Award	Category	Nominee	Result
2015 Festival Biarritz Amérique Latine	Jury Prize	Un Monstruo de Mil Cabezas	Won
2015 Havana Film Festival	Coral Award for Best Lead Actress	Jana Raluy	Won
2015 Morelia International Film Festival	Best Actress in a Mexican Feature Film	Jana Raluy	Won
2016 International Istanbul Film Festival	Golden Tulip (Best Film, International Competition)	Un Monstruo de Mil Cabezas	Won
58th Ariel Awards	Best Picture	Un Monstruo de Mil Cabezas	Nominated
58th Ariel Awards	Best Director	Rodrigo Plá	Nominated
58th Ariel Awards	Best Actress	Jana Raluy	Nominated
58th Ariel Awards	Best Supporting Actor	Emilio Echevarría	Nominated
58th Ariel Awards	Best Adapted Screenplay	Laura Santullo	Won
58th Ariel Awards	Best Editing	Miguel Schverdfinger	Nominated
58th Ariel Awards	Best Sound	Alejandro de Icaza, Axel Muñoz	Nominated
