= Colosio: El asesinato =

- Film poster
- Directed by: Carlos Bolado
- Starring: José María Yazpik; Emiliano Carrillo
- Release date: 8 June 2012
- Running time: 100 minutes
- Country: Mexico
- Language: Spanish

Colosio: El asesinato (lit. 'Colosio: the assassination') is a 2012 Mexican thriller film directed by Carlos Bolado.

The Spanish-language film examines the events leading to the assassination of Mexican presidential candidate Luis Donaldo Colosio, of the PRI party at a campaign rally in Tijuana during the Mexican presidential campaign of 1994.

== Cast ==
- José María Yazpik as Andrés Vázquez
- Daniel Giménez Cacho as José María Córdoba Montoya
- Kate del Castillo as Verónica
- Odiseo Bichir as José Francisco Ruiz Massieu
- Tenoch Huerta Mejía as Jesús 'Chuy'
- Harold Torres as Mario Aburto Martínez / Joel López 'La Ballena' / Juan Manuel Sánchez Ortiz
