= Gustavo Sánchez Parra =

Mexican actor (born 1966)

- Born: 30 September 1966 (age 59); Mexico City, Mexico
- Occupation: Actor
- Years active: 2000–present

Gustavo Sánchez Parra (born 30 September 1966) is a Mexican actor. He has appeared in more than ninety films since 2000.

== Selected filmography ==
Year	Title	Role	Notes
2000	Amores perros	Jarocho	
2001	De la calle		
2002	Asesino en serio		
2004	Man on Fire		
2004	Matando Cabos	Nico	
2008	Road to Fame		
2009	Rage		
2010	Año bisiesto		
2014	The Perfect Dictatorship		
2015	Sealed Cargo		
2015	The Thin Yellow Line	Mario	
2015	The Similars		
2016	Tamara and the Ladybug		
2018	The Inmate		
2018	The Mongolian Conspiracy	Fu Manchú	
2020	New Order	General Oribe	
2023	Sound of Freedom	El Calacas	
2025	Olmo		It was screened in Panorama at the 75th Berlin International Film Festival in February 2025.
