= Diosas de Plata =

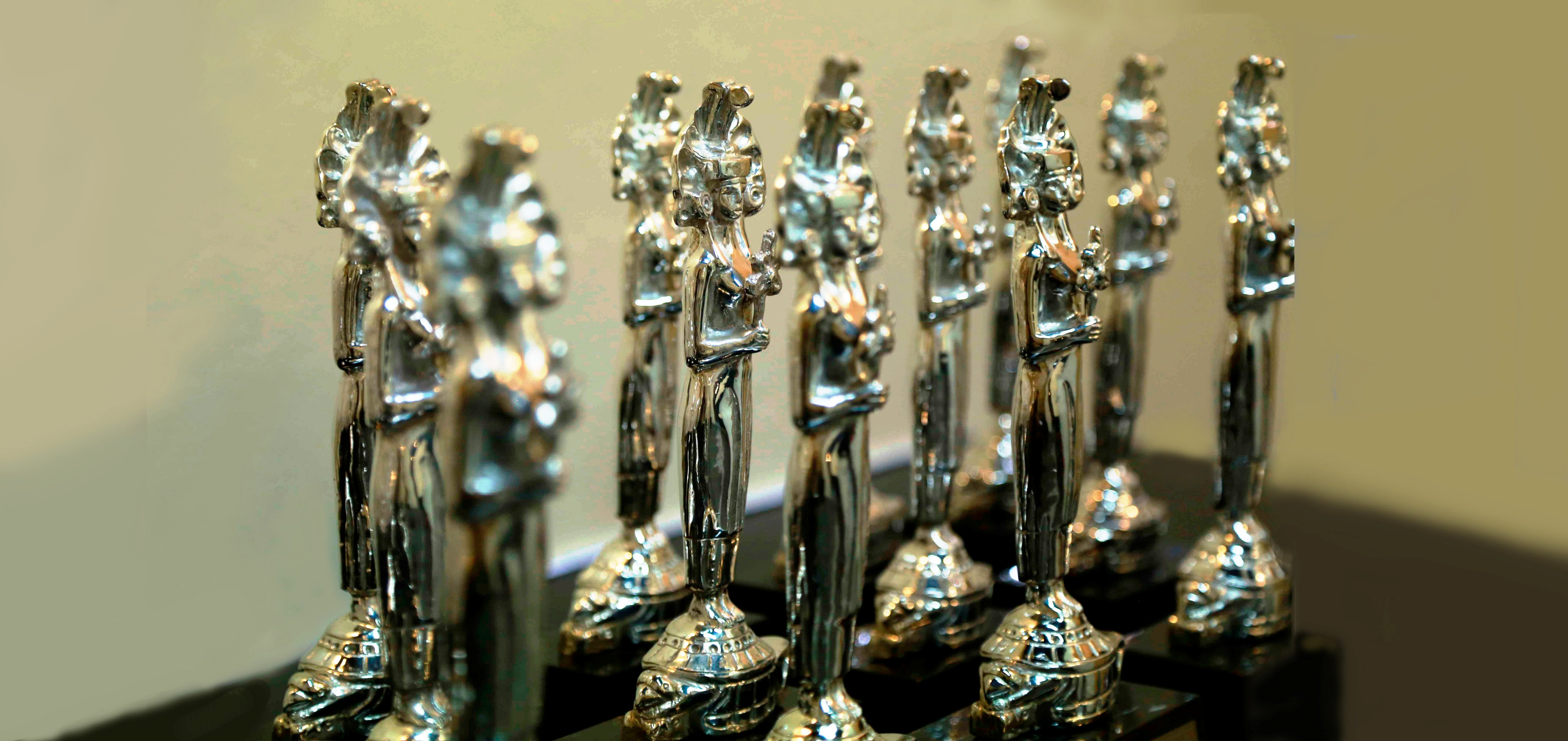
The statuette

The Silver Goddesses (Spanish: Diosas de Plata) is a film award granted annually by the Mexican Film Journalists Association (PECIME) in recognition of professionals and excellence in the Mexican film industry as assessed by the association's voting membership. The first award ceremony was held in 1963; making Tlayucan (1962) the first winner of the Silver Goddesses for Best Film and in eight different categories.
