= MTV Movie Awards Mexico 2003 =

The MTV Movie Awards Mexico 2003 was hosted by José María Yazpik and Patricia Llaca.

== Winners and nominees ==
=== Favorite Movie ===
- Amar te duele
- Ciudades Oscuras
- De Qué Lado Estás
- El crimen del Padre Amaro
- La habitación azul

=== Favorite Actress ===
- Ana Claudia Talancón as Amelia - El crimen del Padre Amaro
- Fabiola Campomanes as Adela - De Qué Lado Estás
- Irán Castillo as Gloria - El Tigre De Santa Julia
- Martha Higareda as Renata - Amar te duele

=== Favorite Actor ===
- Gael García Bernal as El Padre Amaro - El crimen del Padre Amaro
- Kuno Becker as Adrián - La hija del caníbal
- Luis Fernando Peña as Ulises - Amar te duele
- Miguel Rodarte as El Tigre - El Tigre De Santa Julia

=== Best Song from a Movie ===
- "Amarte Duele" — Natalia Lafourcade (Amar te duele)
- "Caníbal" — Kinky (La hija del caníbal)
- "Hiéreme" — La Verbena Popular (El Tigre De Santa Julia)
- "La Velocidad Exacta" — Los Nena (De Qué Lado Estás)

=== Hottest Scene ===
- Martha Higareda, alone in the bathroom - Amar te duele
- Ana Claudia Talancón and Gael García Bernal, together in the hut - El crimen del Padre Amaro
- Patricia Llaca and Juan Manuel Bernal, together in the road - La habitación azul
- Miguel Rodarte with everyone - El Tigre De Santa Julia

=== Favorite Villain ===
- Adalberto Parra as Calleja - El Tigre De Santa Julia
- Alejandro Camacho as Romo - Zurdo
- Alfonso Herrera as Francisco - Amar te duele
- Jesús Ochoa as Riquelme - Ciudades Oscuras
- Luisa Huertas as Dionisia - El crimen del Padre Amaro

=== Best Bichir in a Movie ===
- Bruno Bichir as Satanás - Ciudades Oscuras
- Demián Bichir as Manny - Bendito infierno
- Odiseo Bichir as Javo - Ciudades Oscuras
- Demián Bichir as Mario - Ciudades Oscuras
- Bruno Bichir as Eduardo - Bendito infierno
