= Venezzia =

- Directed by: Haik Gazarian
- Written by: Jorge Hiller
- Produced by: Delfina Catala; Tony Fadel; Ruddy Rodríguez
- Starring: Alfonso Herrera; Ruddy Rodríguez; Rafael Romero
- Distributed by: Alter Producciones
- Release date: 25 September 2009
- Running time: 90 min.
- Country: Venezuela
- Languages: Spanish; English

Venezzia is a 2009 Venezuelan drama film based on real events; the role of Venezuela during World War II and a love story.

The movie stars famous telenovela actress Ruddy Rodríguez and Mexican actor Alfonso Herrera along with another number of well-known Latin American actors.

== Cast ==
- Alfonso Herrera as Frank Moore
- Ruddy Rodríguez as Venezzia
- Rafael Romero as Commander Enrique Salvatierra
- William Goite as Eduardo
- Valentina Rendón as Graciela
- Guillermo Garcia as Mayor Manny Diaz
- Maleja Restrepo as Isabel Nuñez de Diaz
- Santiago Cepeda as Carlomagno
- Rita Bendeck as Tomasa
- Alejandra Azcarate as Estefania
- Felix Antequera as Nicolas

== Plot ==
War and espionage sets the stage for a star-crossed romance in this historical drama from director Haik Gazarian. It's early 1942, and the United States has finally joined the Allied cause in World War II after the attack on Pearl Harbor. Oil is a precious commodity needed to fuel fighter planes, battleships, jeeps and other vehicles, and when German U-Boats are sighted off the coast of Venezuela on the Caribbean Sea, it becomes clear something must be done to guard the nation's oil fields from Nazi attack. Frank Moore (Alfonso Herrera) is an American communications expert sent to the coastal village of Puerto Miranda to help keep tabs on German plans to attack the oil fields. Moore was given the assignment in part because his mother was Latino and he speaks Spanish, but this doesn't help him get along with his commander, the authoritarian and short-tempered Capt. Enrique Salvatierra (Rafael Romero). However, when Moore meets Venezzia (Ruddy Rodriguez), Salvatierra's beautiful wife, he's immediately infatuated, and when she reveals that she shares his attraction, they fall into a love affair that could jeopardize their futures as well as Moore's mission, especially when he's suspected of being a double agent.

== Awards ==
Year	Award	Category	Nominated	Result
2009	El Universo del Espectaculo	Best Picture	Haik Gazarian	Won
2009	El Universo del Espectaculo	Best Story	Haik Gazarian	Won
2009	El Universo del Espectaculo	Best Actress	Ruddy Rodríguez	Won
2009	El Universo del Espectaculo	Best Actor	Rafael Romero	Won
2009	El Universo del Espectaculo	Best Director	Haik Gazarian	Won
2009	Palm Beach International Film Festival	Best Picture	Haik Gazarian	Won
2009	Palm Beach International Film Festival	Best Story	Haik Gazarian	Won
2010	Silver Lei Award en el Honolulu Film Festival	For Excellence in Film	Haik Gazarian	Won
2010	Sonoma International Film Festival	Best Film Foreign	Haik Gazarian	Won
2010	Amsterdam Film Festival	Best Feature Romantic	Haik Gazarian	Won
2010	Festival Internacional de Cine de Canada	Best Actor	Alfonso Herrera	Won
2010	Premios Juventud	Can He Act or What?	Alfonso Herrera	Won
