= MTV Movie Awards Mexico =

- Awarded for: Best in film
- Country: Mexico
- Presented by: MTV
- First award: 2001
- Final award: 2005

The MTV Movie Awards Mexico was an awards show which were established in 2001. The show is based on the US MTV Movie Awards format celebrating local film and actors.

== Winners ==
=== 2001 ===
- Favorite Movie - México:
  - Amores perros
  - La ley de Herodes
  - Por la libre
- Favorite Movie - Chile:
  - Angel Negro
  - Coronación
  - El Chacotero Sentimental: La película
- Favorite Movie - Argentina:
  - 76-89-03
  - Nueve reinas
  - Plata Quemada

=== 2002 ===
- Favorite Movie - México: Y Tu Mamá También
- Favorite Movie - Chile: Taxi para tres
- Favorite Movie - Argentina: Déjala correr
- Best Song from a Movie: "De La Calle" — Ely Guerra (De la calle)
- Best Mexican Talent Drain Abroad: Guillermo del Toro - El Espinazo Del Diablo (director)
- Best Kiss: Diego Luna and Maribel Verdú - Y Tu Mamá También
- Best Insult: Diego Luna and Gael García Bernal - Y Tu Mamá También
- Sexiest Woman: Bárbara Mori - Inspiración
- Baddest Mon: María Rojo - Nadie te oye: Perfume de violetas

=== 2003 ===
- Favorite Movie: Amar te duele
- Favorite Actress: Martha Higareda as Renata - Amar te duele
- Favorite Actor: Gael García Bernal as El Padre Amaro - El crimen del Padre Amaro
- Best Song from a Movie: "Amarte Duele" — Natalia Lafourcade (Amar te duele)
- Hottest Scene: Miguel Rodarte with everyone - El Tigre De Santa Julia
- Favorite Villain: Alfonso Herrera as Francisco - Amar te duele
- Best Bichir in a Movie: Demián Bichir as Manny - Bendito infierno

=== 2004 ===
- Favorite Movie: Nicotina
- Favorite Actress: Ana de la Reguera as Ana - Ladies' Night
- Favorite Actor: Diego Luna as Lolo - Nicotina
- Best Song from a Movie: "Desde Que Llegaste" — Reyli (Ladies' Night)
- Hottest Scene: Table Dance of Ana Claudia Talancón and Ana de la Reguera - Ladies' Night
- Best Diego Luna in a Movie: As Lolo - Nicotina
- Worst Smoker: Lolo (Diego Luna) - Nicotina
- Best Cameo: José María Yazpik as Joaquín the Neighbor - Nicotina
- Sexiest Hero: Orlando Bloom as Will Turner - Pirates of the Caribbean: The Curse of the Black Pearl
- Sexiest Villain: Demi Moore as Madison Lee - Charlie's Angels: Full Throttle
- Best Cinematography in a Video Scandal: René Bejarano or "Don't Close Me the Briefcase"
- Best Colin Farrell in a Movie: as Jim - S.W.A.T.
- Best Miracle in a Movie: The bust of Grace (Bruce makes the breasts bigger of his wife) - Bruce Almighty (Jim Carrey)
- Best Look: Johnny Depp as Jack Sparrow - Pirates of the Caribbean: The Curse of the Black Pearl
- Most Funniest "Gringo" in Japan: Tom Cruise as Nathan Algren - The Last Samurai
- Legend Award: Rosa Gloria Chagoyán

=== 2005 ===
- Favorite Movie: Matando Cabos
- Favorite Actor: Tony Dalton as Jaque - Matando Cabos
- Favorite Actress: Danny Perea as Rita - Temporada de patos
- Best Song from a Movie: "Un Héroe Real" — Aleks Syntek (Robots)
- Favorite Voice from an Animated Movie: Eugenio Derbez as Donkey - Shrek 2
- Most Bizariest Sex: Jacqueline Voltaire and Silverio Palacios - Matando Cabos
- Best Trio for a Movie: Anahí, Dulce María and Jolette - Rebeldía Académica
- Legend Award: Xavier López

== See also ==
- Cinema of Mexico
