= Jolette =

Jolette is a feminine given name. It may refer to:

- Jolette Hernández (born 1984) Mexican singer and television presenter
- Jolette Law, assistant coach for the South Carolina Lady Gamecocks
