= Alfonso Herrera =

Mexican actor and former singer (born 1983)

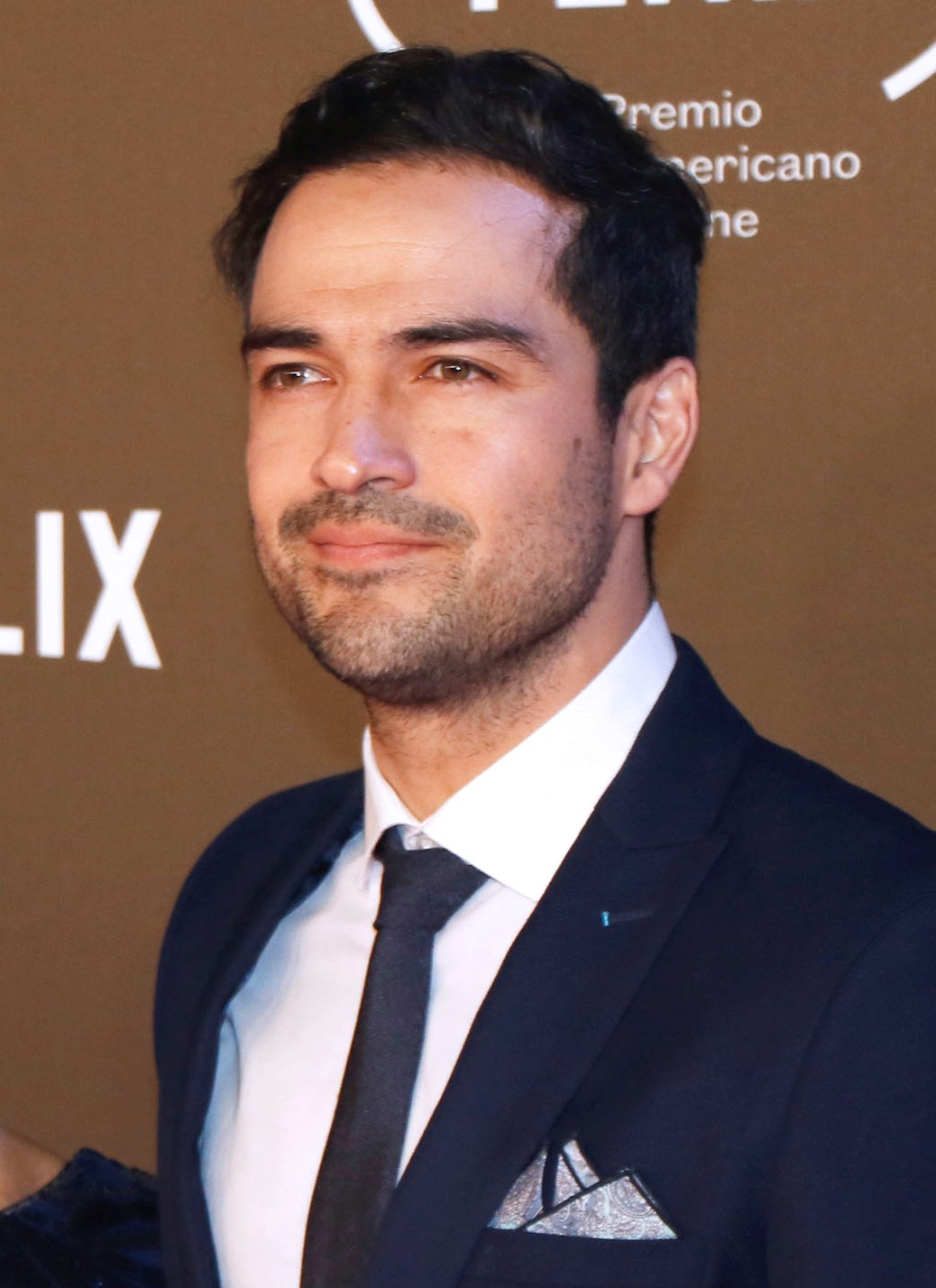
- Herrera in 2017
- Born: Alfonso Herrera Rodríguez; 28 August 1983 (age 42); Mexico City, Mexico
- Other name: Poncho
- Occupations: Actor; producer
- Years active: 2001–present
- Spouse: Diana Vázquez (m. 2016; div. 2021)
- Children: 2
- Musical career
- Genres: Teen pop
- Instrument: Vocals
- Labels: EMI; Capitol
- Formerly of: RBD

Alfonso Herrera Rodríguez (Spanish pronunciation: [alˈfonso eˈreɾa], born 28 August 1983) is a Mexican actor.

Born in Mexico City, Herrera made his television debut in Clase 406 in 2002. In the same year, he made his film debut in Amar te duele and won a MTV Movie Awards Mexico. In 2004, he achieved international stardom playing the protagonist Miguel Arango in the Mexican telenovela Rebelde (2004-06), which spanned the pop musical group RBD (2004–09). Herrera was one of the six singers in the group, which was successful in Latin America, USA and Europe, was nominated twice to the Latin Grammy Award and sold more than 15 million albums worldwide. In 2009, he starred in the Venezuelan film Venezzia, the Mexican series Mujeres Asesinas and the Mexican telenovela Camaleones.

In 2014, Herrera played the lead role in the political satire comedy film The Perfect Dictatorship. From 2015 to 2018, he sensitively portrayed art lecturer, Hernando Fuentes, secret boyfriend of actor Lito Rodriguez, in the American drama series Sense8 on Netflix. He played Father Tomas on the American horror series The Exorcist (2016–17). He co-starred in the American drama series Queen of the South (2018–19). Herrera portrayed Ignacio de la Torre y Mier in Dance of the 41 (2020) and received acclaim for his performance, winning the Ariel Award for Best Actor. In 2022, he co-starred as cartel lieutenant Javi Elizondro in the final season of the Netflix crime drama series Ozark.

== Early life ==
Alfonso Herrera Rodríguez was born in Mexico City. He has an older brother, Alejandro and a younger brother, Oscar. He attended the Edron Academy, alongside Gael García Bernal and Ximena Sariñana and graduated in 2002. Herrera originally wanted to become a pilot and was going to move to San Antonio, Texas, to enroll in an aviation school. He changed his mind and decided to enroll at the Centro de Educación Artística run by Latin American media giant Televisa.

== Career ==
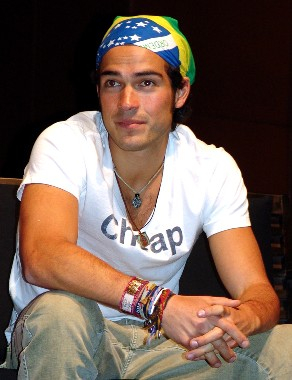
Herrera in 2006 during a press conference of the Mexican band RBD in Brazil.

Following his completion at the Centro de Educación Artística, Herrera began working professionally in theater. He performed in Las Brujas de Salem (2001), Como matar a un ruiseñor (2001) and Antigona (2001).

In 2002, he was cast in the film Amar te duele, directed by Fernando Sariñana, and from there moved into television, working in the telenovela Clase 406, alongside Dulce María, Anahí, and Christian Chávez, who later became his bandmates in RBD. When he starred in the soap opera Clase 406, Herrera participated in the soundtrack together with the cast in the songs "De Donde Vienes... A Donde Vas...?", "Corazón de Ángel", "Por Ti", "Shala La La" and "Grito" from the album Clase 406 - El Siguiente Paso ...! (2003).

In 2004, he participated in the episode "Tres Lágrimas" of the Mexican series Mujer, Casos de la Vida Real and he was cast as one of the main characters in Rebelde, a Mexican remake of the hit Argentine novela Rebelde Way. Herrera played Miguel Arango, a teenager who moves to Mexico City to avenge his father's death. Rebelde was a hit worldwide and had over 400 episodes, lasting from 2004 to 2006.

Following the success of Rebelde, in 2007, Televisa released RBD: La Familia, which starred the members of RBD. The characters of the sitcom were not based on the band's characters in Rebelde, but intended to be similar to the actors' real personalities. RBD: La Familia was the first Mexican show shot entirely in high definition. The show ran from March 14, 2007, to June 13, 2007, and only lasted 13 episodes.

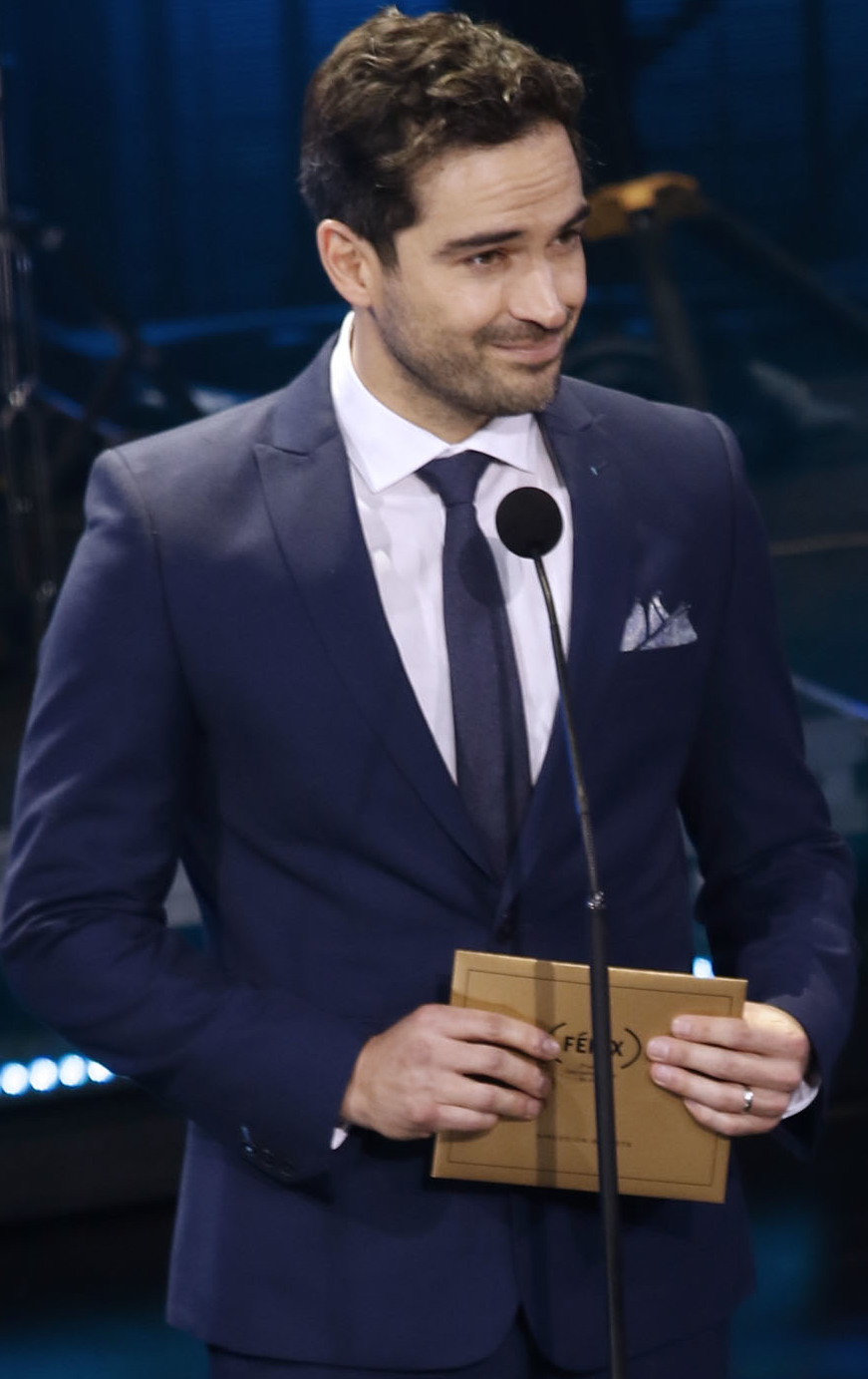
Herrera at the 2017 Fénix Award.

In 2007, Herrera began filming Volverte a Ver with Ximena Herrera. It was released in December 2008. The movie was filmed in Mexico and Argentina. In 2008, he also starred in the play The Pillowman, replacing actor Kuno Becker. To date, RBD has made 9 studio albums, including albums in Spanish, Portuguese and English. They have sold over 15 million albums worldwide, and have toured across Mexico, South America, Serbia, Romania, the United States, and Spain.

Poncho wrote the song "Si No Estas Aqui" on the fifth studio album by the Mexican band RBD, Empezar Desde Cero (2007). On August 15, 2008, RBD released a message telling fans that they had decided to split up. They went on one final tour, Gira del Adiós World Tour, which ended in early 2009. In a November 2008 interview with Open magazine, Herrera said he has no intention of having a solo singing career after RBD and that he does not see himself as a singer. Herrera gave voice to the main character in the animated film Igor (2008). From September to December 2008, Poncho starred in the Mexican series Terminales, playing a man who was diagnosed with a terminal illness.

In 2009, he began filming Venezzia in Venezuela, alongside Ruddy Rodríguez. On May 21, 2009, it was announced that Herrera would star alongside Spanish Mexican singer/actress Belinda Peregrín in Televisa's latest novela, Camaleones. Herrera played Sebastián, a man who pretends to be a professor and steals expensive art work in order to protect his jailed father. On August 6, 2009, he also guest-starred in an episode of Mujeres Asesinas, "Soledad, Cautiva", alongside his Rebelde co-star Angelique Boyer.

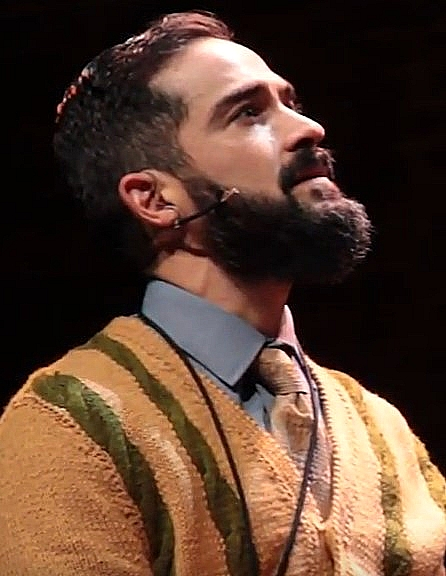
Herrera during the play La sociedad de los poetas muertos (2018).

Poncho was part of the cast of the third season of the series Tiempo Final in the episode "El Billete" in 2009. Herrera also worked alongside actors Plutaco Haza, Paola Núñez, Sergio Klainer, Guillermo Larrea, Jana Raluy, and Raúl Vallejo on the Spanish version of Rain Man, known in Spanish as Cuando los hermanos se encuentran.

Besides Rain Man, 2011 has brought up new projects for Herrera. He worked on a television series called El Equipo produced by Pedro Torres where he played a federal policeman named Fermín Pérez. This series has been compared to the television series CSI and was aired in Mexico as well as the United States. Alfonso is currently filming a television series called El Diez where he will play a soccer player named 'Chava Espinoza'. This series will be aired soon on ESPN Deportes; which is available on the United States as well as some Latin American countries. On August 19, 2011, Así es la Suerte was premiered. He played the revolutionary Aquiles Serdán in the Mexican series El Encanto del Águila (2011).

In 2013, Herrera starred with Paz Vega in the Mexican horror film Espectro. He entered the third season of the Colombian series El Capo (2014) as Niño Malo, for this character, he was nominated for the TVyNovelas Award for best supporting actor in the series and starred in the Mexican film Perfect Obedience. Still in 2014, he was the protagonist of the controversial Mexican film The Perfect Dictatorship.

He also was in the Netflix original series Sense8 (2015–18), where he starred as Hernando Fuentes the boyfriend of Lito Rodriguez, played by Miguel Ángel Silvestre. They are a gay couple who are not open about their relationship due to the fact that Lito is a big Mexican movie star. Once his secret is out Hernando and Lito struggle to persevere through it. In 2015, he starred in the Mexican series El Dandy. In 2016, Herrera gave life to Ramón Mercader in the film The Chosen.

He played Ramón Mercader in the Mexican-Spanish drama The Chosen (2016). Between 2016 and 2017, Herrera participated in two episodes of the Mexican series Drunk History, played Che Guevara and again reprised the role of Aquiles Serdán. Herrera starred Father Tomas in Fox's American horror series The Exorcist (2016–2017). He joined the recurring cast of the third season of the American series Queen of the South (2018) and in the fourth became part of the main cast along with the Brazilian actress Alice Braga. He played Leon in the Mexican series Sitiados: México in 2019.

In 2020, he participated as himself in the episode "Romcom" in the Mexican series How to Survive Being Single by Amazon Prime Video. Also in 2020, Herrera starred in David Pablos's movie Dance of the 41, playing Ignacio de la Torre y Mier, the gay son-in-law of the President of Mexico. For his performance Dance of the 41, he won the Ariel Award for Best Actor.

== Personal life ==
In 2002, Herrera started dating actress and singer Dulce María; they met during the filming of the soap opera Clase 406, and the relationship ended in 2005.

In 2016, he married journalist Diana Vázquez. They have two sons. The couple divorced in 2021. Herrera later had a brief relationship with actress Ana de la Reguera.

== Filmography ==
†	Denotes projects that have not yet been released

=== Film ===
Title	Year	Role	Notes
Amar te Duele	2002	Francisco	
Volverte a Ver	2008	Pablo Murillo	
Igor	2008	Igor	Voice role (Note: For the version released in Latin America.)
Venezzia	2009	Frank Moore	
Así es la Suerte	2011	Guillermo	
The Lorax	2012	Theodore "Ted" Wiggins	Voice role
Espectro	2013	Mario	
The Croods	2013	Guy	Voice role
Museo Memoria y Tolerancia	2013	Man	Short film
Metegol	2013	Amadeo	Voice role
Perfect Obedience	2014	Julián Santos	
Gonzalo	2014	Gonzalo	Short film
The Perfect Dictatorship	2014	Carlos Rojo	
Minions	2015	Walter Nelson	Voice role
The Chosen	2016	Ramón Mercader	
Dance of the 41	2020	Ignacio de la Torre y Mier	Also executive producer
DC League of Super-Pets	2022	Krypto the Superdog	Voice role
Me Casé Con Un Idiota	2022	Iñaki Palacios	
¡Qué viva México!	2023	Pancho Reyes “El Fifí”	
Rebel Moon – Part One: A Child of Fire	2023	Cassius	
The Boy and the Heron	2023	The Grey Heron	Voice role
Migration	2023	Mack Mallard	Voice role
Rebel Moon – Part Two: The Scargiver	2024	Cassius	
Príncipes Salvajes	2024	Rodrigo	
Tesis Sobre una Domesticación	2024	Camila's husband	
Facing El Chapo	2026	Carmona	

=== Television ===
Title	Year	Role	Notes
Clase 406	2002–03	Juan David Rodríguez Pineda	Main role
Mujer, Casos de la Vida Real	2004	Miguel	Episode: "Tres Lágrimas"
Rebelde	2004–06	Miguel Arango Cervera	Main role
La Energía de Sonric'slandia	2005	Miguel Arango Cervera	Episodes: "Calor en la Central" and "Viceversa"
RBD: La Familia	2007	Poncho	Main role
Lola, Érase Una Vez	2007	Himself	1 episode
Terminales	2008	Leonardo Carral	Main role
Mujeres Asesinas	2009	Esteban	Episode: "Soledad, cautiva"
Camaleones	2009–10	Sebastián Jaramillo	Main role
Tiempo Final	2009	Arturo	Episode: "El Billete"
El Equipo	2011	Fermín Pérez	Main role
El Diez	2011	Salvador "Chava" Espinoza	Main role
El Encanto del Águila	2011	Aquiles Serdán	Episode: "Los Mártires de Puebla"
La Ciencia de lo Absurdo	2014–21	Himself	Host
El Capo	2014	Juan Vicente Blanco "Niño Malo"	Main role (season 3)
Sense8	2015–18	Hernando Fuentes	Regular role
El Dandy	2015–16	Daniel "El Dandy" Brach / José "Pepe" Montaño	Main role
Drunk History	2016 2017	Ernesto "Che" Guevara Aquiles Serdán	Episode: "La Coronela, La revolución del Che, El Florero de Llorente" Episode: "La locura de Carlota, Hermanos Serdán, WWII"
The Exorcist	2016–17	Father Tomas Ortega	Main role
Queen of the South	2018–19	Javier Jiménez	Regular role (season 3), Main role (season 4)
Sitiados: México	2019	Léon / Lorenzo	Main role
Knights of the Zodiac: Saint Seiya	2019–20	Cygnus Hyoga	Main role (voice)
Cómo Sobrevivir Soltero	2020	Himself	Episode 7: "Romcom"
Ozark	2022	Javier "Javi" Elizondro	Main role (season 4)
Las muertas	2025	Simon	Main role
The House of the Spirits	2026	Esteban Trueba	Main role

=== Podcasts ===
Title	Year	Role	Notes
Batman Desenterrado	2022	Batman / Bruno Díaz	Main role (voice)

== Theatre ==
Production	Year	Role	Theater
The Pillowman	2008	Michal	Scotiabank Theater
Rain Man	2010	Charlie Babbitt	Diego Rivera Theater
Nadando con Tiburones	2012	Gus	Teatro de los Insurgentes
La Sociedad De Los Poetas Muertos	2018	John Keating	Libanés Theater
El Paraíso de la Invención	2020–21	Father	Milan Theater (Note: Streaming only)

== Awards and nominations ==
Award	Year (Note: Indicates the year of ceremony. Each year is linked to the article about the awards held that year, wherever possible.)	Category	Recipient(s) and nominee(s)	Result	Ref.
Ariel Award	2021	Best Actor	El Baile de los 41	Won	
Bloody Disgusting Reader's Choice Awards	2017	Best Actor – Television	The Exorcist	Won	
Canada International Film Festival	2010	Best Actor	Venezzia	Won	
Diosas de Plata	2009	Best Male Revelation	Volverte A Ver	Nominated	
Diosas de Plata	2015	Best Actor	La Dictadura Perfecta	Nominated	
Imagen Awards	2017	Best Actor – Television	The Exorcist	Nominated	
Imagen Awards	2018	Best Actor – Television	The Exorcist	Nominated	
Imagen Awards	2022	Best Supporting Actor – Drama (Television)	Ozark	Nominated	
Kids Choice Awards	2012	Best Latin Artist	Alfonso Herrera	Nominated	
Kids Choice Awards Mexico	2010	Favorite Male Character	Camaleones	Nominated	
Kids Choice Awards Mexico	2012	Favorite Voice in a Movie	The Lorax	Nominated	
MTV Millennial Awards	2014	Change Agent	Alfonso Herrera	Won	
MTV Movie Awards México	2003	Favorite Villain	Amar te duele	Won	
Premios Juventud	2005	Torrid Romance	Alfonso Herrera and Dulce María	Won	
Premios Juventud	2006	He's Got Style	Alfonso Herrera	Won	
Premios Juventud	2006	What a Hottie!	Alfonso Herrera	Won	
Premios Juventud	2007	He's Got Style	Alfonso Herrera	Nominated	
Premios Juventud	2007	What a Hottie!	Alfonso Herrera	Won	
Premios Juventud	2008	He's Got Style	Alfonso Herrera	Nominated	
Premios Juventud	2008	What a Hottie!	Alfonso Herrera	Nominated	
Premios Juventud	2009	He's Got Style	Alfonso Herrera	Nominated	
Premios Juventud	2009	What a Hottie!	Alfonso Herrera	Nominated	
Premios Juventud	2010	Can He Act or What?	Venezzia	Won	
Premios Juventud	2011	What a Hottie!	Camaleones	Nominated	
Premios Agrupación de Periodistas Teatrales	2019	Best Actor	La Sociedad De Los Poetas Muertos	Nominated	
TVyNovelas Awards Mexico	2006	Best Young Lead Actor	Rebelde	Nominated	
TVyNovelas Awards Colombia	2015	Best Supporting Actor – Series	El Capo	Nominated	
