= Alejandro Calva =

Mexican actor

- Born: Alejandro María Calva; May 31, 1968 (age 57); Mexico City, Distrito Federal, Mexico
- Occupation: Actor
- Years active: 1992-present

Alejandro María Calva (born May 31, 1968 Mexico City, Distrito Federal, Mexico), is a Mexican actor.

== Filmography ==
=== Film roles ===
Year	Title	Roles	Notes
1993	Dollar Mambo	Soldier	Uncredited
2004	Zapata: El sueño de un héroe	Gilgerdo Magaña	
2005	Manos libres	Rodrigo Díaz	
2006	La niña en la piedra	Fidel	
2006	Los secretos de Göring	Federico Göring	Short film
2006	Mezcal	Children Seller	
2007	Malos hábitos	Doctor Sensato	
2008	Conozca la cabeza de Juan Pérez	Tamer	
2008	El último evangelio	Deputy	
2009	El Traspatio	Commander	
2009	Paradas contínuas	Professor Carranco	
2010	Sin ella	Simón	
2010	Chicogrande	Francisco Villa	
2010	Sin memoria	Masota	
2010	El Infierno	Police Officer	
2011	La otra familia	Father Tomás	
2011	Así es la suerte	Director	
2011	Viento en contra	Juan Manuel Orta	
2012	El cielo en tu mirada	Don Óscar	
2014	The Popcorn Chronicles	Archimboldo	
2014	Yerbamala	Governor Francisco Carreño	
2014	Cantinflas	Jacques Gelman	
2015	A la mala	Fabric Seller	
2015	Una última y nos vamos	Officer Reyes	
2016	The Chosen	Siqueiros	
2016	Qué pena tu vida	Car Seller	
2018	Una mujer sin filtro	Leonardo	
2018	Sacúdete las penas	Martín del Campo	
2024	Total Loss	Arturo	

=== Television roles ===
Year	Title	Roles	Notes
2000	Todo por amor	Álvaro	
2001	La intrusa	Father Chema	
2004	Gitanas	Lazlo	
2004	Zapata: Amor en rebeldía	General Rodolfo Fierro	
2005	Corazón partido	Ramón Cadena "El Tanque"	
2007	Muchachitas como tú	Abel	
2007	¿Y ahora qué hago?	Gerard	Main role; 13 episodes
2008	Capadocia	Gerardo	Recurring role; 3 episodes
2008–2009	Los simuladores	Pablo López	Main role (seasons 1–2); 31 episodes
2008–2009	Un gancho al corazón	Andres Riveradneira	Recurring role; 10 episodes
2009	Mi pecado	Father Matias Quiroga	Recurring role; 22 episodes
2010	Cuando me enamoro	Manriquez	Recurring role; 20 episodes
2010	Gritos de muerte y libertad	Miguel Bataller	Recurring role; 3 episodes
2010–2011	Los héroes del Norte	El Trácalas Don Pascasio Bernal	Episode: "Faquir, levántate y anda" Episode: "La despedida"
2011–present	La Reina del Sur	César Güemes "Batman"	Main role (seasons 1–3)
2011	Mentes en shock	Horacio	Episode: "Pilot"
2011	La Mariposa	General Vasquez	
2012	Historias delirantes	Vicente	Episode: "El apostador"
2012	Pacientes	Pablo	Episodes: "Perfección" and "Más respeto, niño"
2012	Lado B	Bernardo	Television film
2012–2013	Lynch	Javier Buendía	Series regular (seasons 1–2); 21 episodes
2014	El Mariachi	Unknown role	Episode: "El crimen"
2014–2015	Señora Acero	Miguel Quintanilla	Recurring role (season 1); Main role (season 2)
2016	Drunk History	Miguel Hidalgo	Episode: "Yerno Incómodo, Trotsky en México, Hidalgo contra Allende"
2016	El Vato	Don Jesús "Chucho" Durán	Episodes: "Gente de palabra" and "Fama"
2016	Hasta que te conocí	Enrique Okamura	Recurring role; 4 episodes
2016–2017	Despertar contigo	Rafael	Series regular; 105 episodes
2018	José José, el príncipe de la canción	Toño Camacho	Series regular; 19 episodes
2018	El Recluso	La Foca	Recurring role; 5 episodes
2019	Doña Flor y sus dos maridos	Octavio Mercader Serrano	Main role; 70 episodes
2023–2024	El maleficio	Cayetano	Main role
