= Drunk History (disambiguation) =

Drunk History is an American television series.

Drunk History may also refer to:

- Drunk History (British TV series), the British version of the show
- Drunk History (Mexican TV series), the Mexican version of the show
- Drunk History Australia, the Australian version of the show
