= Alexander Holtmann =

Finnish-German actor (born 1978)

- Born: August 19, 1978 (age 48); Bad Segeberg, West Germany
- Education: Stella Adler Academy
- Occupation: Actor
- Years active: 2002–present
- Website: alexanderholtmann.com

Alexander Holtmann (born 19 August 1978) is a Finnish-German cinema, television and theatre actor known for his characters in Humboldt in Mexico, The Chosen, Capadocia, El Señor de los Cielos, Qué bonito amor, Fortuna, La Patrona amongst others.

== Early life ==
Holtmann was born in Bad Segeberg, West Germany, to a Finnish mother and German father.

== Training ==
- Acting Technique - Irene Gilbert, Stella Adler Academy
- Scene Study - Charles Waxberg, Stacy Ray
- Script Analysis - Charles Waxberg
- Stage Combat - Louis Roth
- Improvisation - Dan Weisman, Pat Dade
- Sketch - Kent Skov, L.A. Connection
- Shakespeare - Debbie Wastling
- Chekhov - Yevgeni Lazarev

== Special skills ==
- Languages - English, German, Finnish, Spanish, Swedish
- Sports - PADI Rescue Diver, Paintball, Volleyball, Ping Pong, Biking, Squash, Horseback riding
- Martial Arts - Jiu-Jitsu, Aikido, Stage combat, Fencing
- Military Training - Field Medic, Ambulance Driver, Automatic and Semiautomatic Weapons
- Drivers License C1E (Truck-European Union)

== Filmography ==
=== Film ===
- Humboldt, the Gaze of the Explorer - Ana Cruz Navarro
- La gran promesa - Dir. Jorge Ramírez
- The Chosen - Dir. Antonio Chavarrías
- El sueño del Marakame - Dir. Federico Cecchetti
- Quack - Dir. Eduardo Perea
- Lalito - Contrabajo Films
- The Boy Who Smells Like Fish, Treading Water - Dir. Analeine Cal y Mayor
- In Lak'ech Ala K'in: Code of the Heart - Dir. Catherine Cunningham
- Toda la suerte del mundo - Dir. Alberto Allende
- La Brujula la lleva el Muerto - Dir. Arturo Pons
- Zeviathan - Dir. Iker Orozco
- Los Trashumantes - Dir. Federico Cecchetti
- Matriushkas - Dir. Luciana Solórzano
- Los Pajarracos - Dir. Horacio Rivera, Héctor Hernández
- Kiljusten herrasvaen uudet seikkailut - Polarfilms

=== Television ===
- El Dragón- Hans Prinket/ Lemon Studios
- El Chema - Lesly Carrol / Telemundo
- Señora Acero - John Floyd - Telemundo
- Grandes Transformaciones de México - Maximiliano de Habsburgo - Televisa
- El Hotel de los secretos - Sheamus Rangel - Roberto Gómez Fernández, Televisa
- Amor de Barrio - Walter - Roberto Hernández Vázquez, Televisa
- Coleccionista - Maximiliano de Habsburgo - OPMA
- Alguién más - Maestro Kanvar - Canana Films y Canal Once (Mexico)
- Las trampas del deseo - Humberto - Argos Comunicación y MundoFox
- Fortuna - Luka Gomorov - Argos Comunicación y Cadena Tres
- El Señor de los Cielos - Randy Prescott - Argos Comunicación y Telemundo
- Locked up abroad /Howard Marks - Patrick Lane - National Geographic Channel
- La Patrona - Arthur Kelley - Argos Comunicación y Telemundo
- Que Bonito Amor - Arnold Smith - Salvador Mejía Alejandre, Televisa
- Capadocia 3 - Carter - Argos Comunicación
- Infames - Mayor Richard Davis - Argos Comunicación y Cadena Tres
- La Teniente - Ambassador McKenzie - Azteca 7, TV Azteca
- El Encanto del Aguila - Second Lt. Charles Copp - Canal de las Estrellas, Televisa
- Los Minondo - Partner 1 - Canal Once (Mexico)
- Drenaje Profundo - Michael Hudson young - TV Azteca
- XY 2 - Private secretary - Canal Once (Mexico)

=== Theatre ===
- Humboldt, México para los mexicanos - Ernesto Anaya Ottone/ Teatro sin paredes
- Angustia/ A puerta cerrada - Jean-Paul Sartre
- Acreedores - August Strindberg
- Güero en México - stand up Alexander Holtmann
- Choros Criticos - stand up Alexander Holtmann / Blanca Salces
- The Proposal - Anton Chekhov
- The Jubilee - Anton Chekhov
- The Bear - Anton Chekhov
- Pygmalion - G.Bernard Shaw
- Two Gentlemen of Verona - G.Bernard Shaw
- The Taming of the Shrew - William Shakespeare
- A Christmas Carol - Charles Dickens
- The Nutcracker - E. T. A. Hoffmann
- Platero and Me - Juan Ramón Jiménez
- The Swan Lake - Pyotr Ilyich Tchaikovsky
- Don Quijote - Miguel de Cervantes
- Little Red Ridinghood - Charles Perrault
- Cinderella - Charles Perrault
- Sleeping Beauty - Charles Perrault
- Pastorela - Cesar Chavez Belmont
- Instant Comedy Soup - Stella Adler Theatre L.A.
- A little bit of Improv - Studio Theatre L.A.
- IMPROV! - Irene Gilbert Theatre L.A.
- ImproVable Cause - Jewel Box Theatre L.A.
- Sketch & Improv - L.A Connection, Dan Weisman
