= Espectro (film) =

- Film poster
- Directed by: Alfonso Pineda Ulloa
- Written by: Carlos Esteban Orozco; Juan Felipe Orozco; Alfonso Pineda Ulloa
- Starring: Paz Vega; Johanna Murillo; Alfonso Herrera; Maya Zapata
- Release date: 1 November 2013
- Country: Mexico
- Language: Spanish

Espectro is a 2013 Mexican horror film, writer and directed by Alfonso Pineda Ulloa and starring Paz Vega, Johanna Murillo and Alfonso Herrera. It was released on November 1, 2013. The film is also known as Demon Inside.

== Plot ==
Marta (Paz Vega) is a clairvoyant who has been running a small shop and consultation, working mainly with Tarot cards. At the beginning of the movie, she is about to be released from a psychiatric hospital, where she has been for some time, due to very intense conditions of PTSD and agoraphobia. It is soon revealed that prior to her admittance to the hospital, she had fallen in love with Mario (Alfonso Herrera), an architect visiting her shop, who after a few, completely innocuous dates, suddenly appeared in a parking facility, looking very disturbed, and subsequently raped her violently, traumatizing her severely.

We see in flashbacks that she has had her special ability since early childhood, apparently inherited from her mother, who explains its nature to her – including the fact that “No one can see everything”, i.e. that some things will remain hidden even from Marta. In the course of the movie, we learn that Marta's father died when she was very young – but that even with a photo of him, and his ghost (smiling lovingly at Marta) sitting nearby (and visible to Marta's mother), Marta cannot see him.

Further flashbacks, and press clippings, gradually reveal that she can see and communicate with ghosts, sometimes simply comforting them, sometimes helping police uncover what was actually murder.

In the present, her friend Monica (Johanna Murillo) helps Marta settle into a small apartment (in a building belonging to Monica's uncle), since Marta refuses to go home because Mario knows her address. Monica has brought some things from her home and her shop, but Marta instructs Monica to burn the clairvoyance paraphernalia, embittered that in spite of her gift, she never had an inkling about Mario's dark side. Monica explains that Mario is in prison, but Marta still feels very uneasy. Shortly afterwards, Marta is looking out her kitchen window, seeing her neighbor's kitchen window across a very small inner courtyard. Her neighbor, visited by a lesbian lover, ominously takes a kitchen knife, at the same time noticing Marta, who is obviously frightened by the incident. After a little while, the neighbor knocks on Marta's door, alternately saying that she just wants to talk and yelling, “What did you see?!”, meanwhile brandishing a knife.

Marta gets glimpses of her new apartment showered in blood and of a presence, seemingly a woman who might have come to a violent end in that very apartment. Marta asks Monica to ask her uncle about it, and does some searching on the internet on her own, discovering that a woman seems to have been killed in the building, with Marta's frightening neighbor as a prime suspect, but never charged. Marta also uses the internet to check up on Mario, discovering to her horror that Mario was acquitted of the rape charges and is therefore on the loose. Later that evening, looking through her living-room window down in the street, she sees someone looking uncannily like Mario. Terrified, Marta calls the police, who tell her that they cannot help her. In a subsequent conversation, Monica admits to having lied about his imprisonment to Marta, in order to make her feel safe.

Marta then covers her windows with newspaper pages and orders surveillance gear via the internet. She instructs the delivery man to leave the things at her door and barely manages to retrieve the material before her scary neighbor comes running out on their shared landing. Marta installs surveillance cameras in her home and cameras overlooking the street and the landing. The cameras capture another appearance in the street of Mario, another angry outburst from the neighbor, and many appearances inside the apartment of the ghost of the woman who has apparently been murdered in a horrible fashion. Marta also has these visions on her own, but in a phone conversation Monica reports back from her uncle that Marta's apartment has been empty for months, and that no one has ever been murdered there.

Suddenly, while Marta is standing in her bathroom, she is attacked by Mario who stabs her with a pair of scissors while trying to rape her once more. Badly wounded she fights him off momentarily, slowly dragging herself from room to room, trying to reach the landing. Every instant is identical to her visions, and she realizes that her visions were not visitations from a ghost in the past, but her gift trying to warn her about her own imminent future. She calls Monica, trying to explain this, but it is unclear how much of it Monica understands. After a violent setback in the shape of another attack from Mario, Marta manages to escape into the elevator. Here, the movie ends abruptly, leaving the viewer in doubt as to whether she dies from her wounds in the elevator (which seems probable) or might be saved by Monica when the elevator reaches the ground floor.

== Cast ==
- Paz Vega - Marta
- Johanna Murillo
- Alfonso Herrera - Mario
- Maya Zapata
- Gala Montes - Marta Chica
- María de Orduña - Madre
- Arnulfo Reyes Sanchez - Repartidor
- Marco Trevio - Doctor
- Marco Treviño - Doctor
- Antonio de la Vega
- Silvina Cassisi - espectro
