= Miss Venezuela 1985 =

32nd edition of the Miss Venezuela competition

- Date: May 3, 1985
- Presenters: Gilberto Correa; Carmen Victoria Pérez; Raúl Velasco
- Venue: Macuto Sheraton Hotel, Caraballeda, Vargas, Venezuela
- Broadcaster: Venevision
- Entrants: 25
- Placements: 8
- Winner: Silvia Martínez; Guárico

Miss Venezuela 1985 was the 32nd Miss Venezuela pageant, was held in Caraballeda, Vargas state, Venezuela, on May 3, 1985, after weeks of events. The winner of the pageant was Silvia Martínez, Miss Guárico.

The pageant was broadcast live on Venevision from the Macuto Sheraton Hotel in Caraballeda, Vargas state. At the conclusion of the final night of competition, outgoing titleholder Carmen María Montiel, crowned Silvia Martínez of Guárico as the new Miss Venezuela.

== Results ==
=== Placements ===
- Miss Venezuela 1985 - Silvia Martínez (Miss Guárico)
- Miss World Venezuela 1985 - Ruddy Rodríguez (Miss Anzoátegui)

The runners-up were:

- 1st runner-up - Nina Sicilia (Miss Monagas)
- 2nd runner-up - Gisela Paz (Miss Departamento Libertador)
- 3rd runner-up - Marina Di Vora (Miss Portuguesa)
- 4th runner-up - Yvonne Balliache (Miss Miranda)
- 5th runner-up - Fulvia Torre (Miss Lara)
- 6th runner-up - Rebeca Costoya (Miss Nueva Esparta)

=== Special awards ===
- Miss Photogenic (voted by press reporters) - Ruddy Rodríguez (Miss Anzoátegui)
- Miss Congeniality - Eugenia Lugo (Miss Táchira)
- Miss Elegance - Nina Sicilia (Miss Monagas)
- Miss Amity - Marlene Malavé (Miss Delta Amacuro)

== Contestants ==
The Miss Venezuela 1985 delegates are:

- Miss Amazonas - Janeth Pérez Zambrano
- Miss Anzoátegui - Ruddy Rodríguez De Lucía
- Miss Apure - Ingrid Serrano González
- Miss Aragua - Mary Gracia Bravo Silva
- Miss Barinas - Maria Dolores García
- Miss Bolívar - Denisse Novell Nieto
- Miss Carabobo - Linda Guerrero Trabasillo
- Miss Cojedes - Rita de Gois Agostinho
- Miss Delta Amacuro - Marlene Narcisa Malavé
- Miss Departamento Libertador - Gisela Paz Besada
- Miss Departamento Vargas - Gisselle Reyes Castro
- Miss Distrito Federal - Raquel Frederick Pérez
- Miss Falcón - Zulma López Velásquez
- Miss Guárico - Silvia Martínez Stapulionis
- Miss Lara - Fulvia Torre Mattioli
- Miss Mérida - Olga Hernández Fernández
- Miss Miranda - Yvonne Balliache Guevara
- Miss Monagas - Nina Sicilia Hernández
- Miss Nueva Esparta - Rebeca Costoya López
- Miss Portuguesa - Marina Di Vora Cedolini
- Miss Sucre - Beatrix Montero Hafemann
- Miss Táchira - Eugenia Lugo Behrens
- Miss Trujillo - Carmen Cecilia Candiales
- Miss Yaracuy - Raiza Preziuso Pernía
- Miss Zulia - Rosalina Méndez Semeco
