= The House at the End of Time =

- Original Venezuelan poster
- La casa del fin de los tiempos
- Directed by: Alejandro Hidalgo
- Written by: Alejandro Hidalgo
- Produced by: Alejandro Hidalgo
- Starring: Ruddy Rodriguez
- Cinematography: Cezary Jaworski
- Edited by: Miguel Angel Garcia; Judilam Goncalves Montilla; Alejandro Hidalgo
- Music by: Yoncarlos Medina
- Production companies: Centro Nacional Autónomo de Cinematografía; Fundación Villa del Cine; JEMD Films
- Release date: June 17, 2013 (Venezuelan Film Festival)
- Running time: 101 minutes
- Country: Venezuela
- Language: Spanish
- Box office: $4.4 million (Venezuela)

The House at the End of Time (Spanish: La casa del fin de los tiempos) is a 2013 Venezuelan horror thriller film directed by Alejandro Hidalgo and starring Ruddy Rodríguez. The film had its world premiere on June 17, 2013, at the Venezuelan Film Festival.

It is the highest-grossing horror film in Venezuelan history, and the most internationally-distributed Venezuelan film. In 2016, New Line Cinema announced that it was planning to remake the film with Hidalgo.

== Plot ==
In 1981, Dulce lived in an old house with her sons Leopoldo and Rodrigo, and her husband Juan José. Amid strange supernatural phenomena, her family is attacked. Dulce, bleeding from a wound on her face, regains consciousness and races downstairs to protect her family. In the cellar, she finds Juan José dead of a stab wound, and Leopoldo disappears into thin air after being mysteriously pulled through a doorway.

When her prints are found on the murder weapon, Dulce is arrested and imprisoned. Thirty years later, an elderly Dulce is released from jail—under the requirement that she serve the rest of her sentence under house arrest in the very house where the murders took place. Once settled, Dulce is visited by a local priest (Guillermo Garcia) who wants to restore her faith in God. When the priest expresses his own faith in her innocence, she enlists his help to learn the truth.

Investigating the house's history in the library, the priest learns that an English Freemason built the house a hundred years earlier, only to disappear mysteriously. Subsequent news reports indicate frequent disappearances. Dulce claims the house to be haunted after she sees an elderly man scrawl a series of elevens on her mirror, but the police instead accuse her of being crazy. The priest arrives in time to stop Dulce from committing suicide, and, with the house's history, convinces her that she may yet rescue her Leopoldo.

In 1981, Leopoldo and Rodrigo played with the local children. Rodrigo develops a crush on a girl, and Leopoldo devises a secret handshake with his best friend. After an apparent intruder in the house vanishes, Dulce becomes worried when Leopoldo hands her a note he says comes from a ghost. The note warns her that she must prevent her children from playing together for the next few days and accuses Juan José of attempting to murder Leopoldo in the future. Juan José dismisses the note and allows the children to play together. During a baseball game, Leopoldo is responsible for a freak accident that kills Rodrigo.

Not knowing what else to do, Dulce consults a local medium. The woman channels a conversation from the future in which Juan José refuses to recognize Leopoldo as his son and attempts to kill him. Distraught, Dulce demands a divorce from Juan José. Initially surprised, Juan José then threatens her if she attempts to take the kids away from him. While grieving the loss of Rodrigo and confused about his failed marriage, Juan José finds evidence that Leopoldo is not his child. Enraged that Dulce would keep this secret from him, he attacks Dulce and Leopoldo.

In 2011, as the clock hits 11:11 and 11 seconds on November 11, Dulce realizes that the house has transported her 30 years into the past, just before Rodrigo's death. As she bangs on the doors and scares her family, she realizes that she is the source of the disturbances and ghostly apparitions that have haunted her family. She quickly writes a note to Leopoldo that explains the future events and make him promise to give it to her 1981 self without reading it. A version of Leopoldo from after Rodrigo's death also travels backward in time to same day and sees Rodrigo again; he tearfully embraces his brother.

When Dulce travels to the day of Leopoldo's disappearance, she meets an elderly man who introduces himself as Leopoldo from 2071. He explains that the house has the ability to randomly transport people through time and that she must kill Juan José and abduct his 1981 self, as he has a latent disease that 1981 medicine can not cure. Though reluctant to follow through with causing her own murder conviction and loss of a child, Dulce relents, knowing it is the only way. In 2011, the priest reveals himself as Leopoldo's best friend by performing their secret handshake. Then the priest leads Leopoldo out of the house, claiming to the police guards that it is one of his local orphans. When clear, the priest introduces Leopoldo to Rodrigo's crush, now a grown woman.

== Cast ==
- Ruddy Rodríguez as Dulce
- Gonzalo Cubero as Juan José
- Rosmel Bustamante as Leopoldo
- Guillermo Garcia as Priest
- Hector Mercado as Rodrigo
- Yucemar Morales as Sarai
- Efrain Romero as Mario
- José León as Elder
- Alexander Da Silva as Police 1
- Amanda Key as Sarai
- William Lodoño as Police 2

== Reception ==
The film has been well received in its country of origin, where it grossed $4.4 million and became the highest-grossing horror film in the history of Venezuela. After a festival run in which it won various awards, it also became the most distributed Venezuelan film in the world, showing in 33 countries. It was the 6th highest-grossing film in Latin America in 2013, being distributed in theatres for 41 weeks and attracting 623,700 spectators. Following its success, in August 2016 New Line Cinema announced that it had bought the rights to produce a remake, with Hidalgo returning as director and producer.

The Montreal Gazette and Shock Till You Drop both praised the film, with Shock Till You Drop comparing it favorably to the similarly themed movies The Conjuring, The Others and Oculus and declaring that "The House at the End of Time is the best of all of those films." Fangoria rated the film two and a half stars, criticizing it as being "aesthetically separated" at times but also stating that "the film's emotional center is sound". Paste listed it as their #69 best horror film available on Amazon Prime, calling it "ambitious but somewhat messy" and noting that it lacks success and profundity in key areas, but that Rodríguez's performance gives it some quality. Jim Vorel concluded that "If you get on a South American horror kick, you'll end up watching it eventually".

=== Awards ===
Year	Event	Award	Nominee(s)	Result	Ref.
2013	Venezuelan Film Festival of Mérida	Audience Award		Won	
2013	Venezuelan Film Festival of Mérida	Best Cinematography		Won	
2013	Venezuelan Film Festival of Mérida	Best Sound		Won	
2013	Venezuelan Film Festival of Mérida	Special Mention for Child Actors		Won	
2013	Venezuelan ECO Film Festival	Best Music		Won	
2013	Venezuelan ECO Film Festival	Best Sound		Won	
2014	Screamfest Horror Film Festival	Best Director	Alejandro Hidalgo	Won	
2014	Screamfest Horror Film Festival	Best Film		Won	
2014	Venezuelan Film Festival in New York	Audience Award for Best Film		Won	
2014	Fantasy FilmFest (FFF)	Audience Award for Best Film		Second place	
2014	Colombia-Venezuela Binational Film Festival	Best Film		Won	
2014	Colombia-Venezuela Binational Film Festival	Best Director	Alejandro Hidalgo	Won	
2014	Colombia-Venezuela Binational Film Festival	Best Actor	Rosmel Bustamante	Won	
2014	Buenos Aires Rojo Sangre	Best Latin American Film		Won	
2014	Buenos Aires Rojo Sangre	Best Actress	Ruddy Rodriguez	Won	
2014	Mórbido Film Fest	Bronze Skull		Special Recognition	
2015	FilmQuest	Best Feature Film		Won	
2015	Tri-Cities International Film Festival (TRIFI)	Best Horror Feature		Won	
2016	Palm Beach International Film Festival	Best Horror Film		Won	

It has also been part of the official selection at: Cannes Film Festival 2014; the 20th L'Etrange Festival in Paris in 2014; the Fantasia International Film Festival 2014; the Fresh Blood category at the Fantasy FilmFest in Germany in 2014; the London Discovery section of FrightFest 2014; the Fantastic Cinema of Latin America category at Blood Windows 2014; and Fantasporto 2014. It also received Special Mention at the Colombia-Venezuela Binational Film Festival.
