= Último cuerpo =

- Directed by: Carlos Daniel Malavé
- Starring: William Goite; Miguel Ferrari; Jean Paul Leroux; Mercedes Brito; Guillermo Canache
- Release date: 2011
- Country: Venezuela
- Language: Spanish

Último cuerpo is a Venezuelan film released in 2011. Directed and produced by Carlos Daniel Malavé, with a script inspired by a real character, Heberto Camacho, a journalist from Maracaibo. The film stars William Goite and Miguel Ferrari.

== Plot ==
While investigating the murder of a transsexual, journalist Heriberto Camargo (William Goite) discovers that the crime is part of a plot of police murders attributed to a character known as Vincent (Jean Paul Leroux). The chronicles published by Camargo and his investigations to uncover the motive for the crimes bring him face to face with commissioner Sangretti (Miguel Ferrari).

== Cast ==
- Jean Paul Leroux
- William Goite
- Guillermo Garcia
- Miguel Ferrari
- Jose Roberto Diaz
- Jesus Cervo
