= Los hombres también lloran =

- Genre: Telenovela
- Created by: Juan Taratuto
- Written by: Ana María Parra
- Directed by: Laura Mora Ortega; Carlos Moreno
- Starring: Guillermo García; Mónica Lopera; Carolina Gómez
- Theme music composer: "Las cosas de la vida" by Carlos Vives
- Country of origin: Colombia
- Original language: Spanish

Production
- Executive producer: Alessandro Angulo
- Production location: Bogotá
- Cinematography: Alfredo Ruiz

Original release
- Network: Caracol Televisión
- Release: April 21 – July 3, 2015

Related
- No sos vos, soy yo (2004)

Los hombres también lloran is a Colombian telenovela produced by Alessandro Angulo for Caracol Televisión. It is based on the Argentinian film No sos vos, soy yo produced in 2004. The telenovela premiered on April 21, 2015 on Venevisión, was first aired in Venezuela then in Colombia.

== Plot ==
Los hombres también lloran tells the story of Javier, a man who thought he had everything in life: being a recognized doctor who is within days of receiving his desired promotion and being married to a beautiful woman. Thrilled with their new income, the couple buys an expensive apartment, and Maria gets excited over their more luxurious lifestyle. However, their dreams of the good life are dashed. When his office is assigned to another doctor, it causes the collapse of Javier and Maria's world. They decide to start a new life in Miami. She travels first, while he stays to sell everything. The day comes for Javier to travel to Miami when he gets a call from Maria saying "Javier, don't come!".

== Cast ==
- Guillermo García as Javier Torres
- Carolina Gómez as María Sáenz
- Florina Lemaitre as Estela
- Mónica Lopera as Julia Vanegas
- Andrés Castañeda as Luis Gómez
- Constanza Duque as Lina
- Carlos Vives as José
- Marcela Benjumea as Gloria Mercedes
- Jairo Camargo as Eugenio
- Cecilia Navia as Laura Rodríguez
- Juan Pablo Escobar as Gabriel Méndez
- Marcelo Dos Santos as Dr Vicente Domínguez
- Kimberly Reyes as Kimberly
- Julio Pachón as Christian de Mar
- Christian Tappan as Edgard
- Rodrigo Candamil as Federico Ramos
- Humberto Dorado as Horacio Gómez
- Tiberio Cruz as Edwin Selecta
- Luz Estrada as Romina
- Fabio Rubiano as "Detective Carlos Rojas"
- Santiago Alarcón as Pablo Herrera
- José Restrepo as Socrates Martín
- Fernando Arévalo as Rafael López
