= Hernán (TV series) =

Spanish-Mexican historical drama TV series

- Genre: Historical period drama
- Starring: Óscar Jaenada
- Countries of origin: Mexico; Spain
- Original languages: Spanish; Maya; Nahuatl
- No. of seasons: 1
- No. of episodes: 8

Production
- Production companies: Televisión Azteca; Onza Entertainment; Dopamine

Original release
- Network: Amazon Prime Video
- Release: 21 November 2019

Related
- Cortés

Hernán is a Spanish, Nahuatl, and Maya language historical drama television series co-produced by Televisión Azteca, Dopamine, and Onza Entertainment that became available for streaming worldwide on Amazon Prime Video on 21 November 2019, except in the United States, and it will subsequently premiere on 22 November 2019 on History in Latin America, and later on TV Azteca on 24 November 2019 in Mexico. The first season consists of eight episodes, and a second season had originally been confirmed, which was supposed to begin filming in January 2020. The series planned its premiere as part of the 500th anniversary of the Fall of Tenochtitlan and revolves around Hernán Cortés (Óscar Jaenada) from his arrival at the Mexican coast until the defeat of the Mexicas.

A+E Networks International agreed to globally distribute the series in November 2019.

== Cast ==
Part of the cast was confirmed on October 15, 2019, by the newspaper El Imparcial.

- Óscar Jaenada as Hernán Cortes
- Dagoberto Gama as Moctezuma Xocoyotzin
- Ishbel Bautista as La Malinche
- Jorge Antonio Guerrero as Xicotencatl
- Mitzi Mabel Cadena as Doña Luisa
- Michel Brown as Pedro de Alvarado
- Víctor Clavijo as Cristóbal de Olid
- Almagro San Miguel as Gonzalo de Sandoval
- Miguel Ángel Amor as Bernal Díaz del Castillo
- Isabel Luna as Mictecacihuatl

== Episodes ==
No.	Title	Directed by	Written by	Original release date
1	"Marina"	Norberto López Amado	Curro Royo	21 November 2019
2	"Olid"	Julián de Tavira	María Jaén	21 November 2019
3	"Xicotencatl"	Norberto López Amado	María Jaén & Julián de Tavira	21 November 2019
4	"Bernal"	Norberto López Amado	María Jaén	21 November 2019
5	"Moctezuma"	Norberto López Amado	Curro Royo	21 November 2019
6	"Alvarado"	Julián de Tavira	María Jaén	21 November 2019
7	"Sandoval"	Álvaro Ron	María Jaén & Curro Royo	21 November 2019
8	"Hernán"	Norberto López Amado	Curro Royo & Julián de Tavira	21 November 2019

== Awards and nominations ==
Year	Award	Category	Nominee(s)	Result	Ref.
2020	29th Actors and Actresses Union Awards	Best Actor in an International Production	Óscar Jaenada	Won	
2021	8th MiM Series Awards	Best Miniseries		Nominated	
2021	8th MiM Series Awards	Best Screenplay	Julián de Tavira, María Jaén, Amaya Muruzabal, Curro Royo	Nominated	
