= Así es la suerte =

- Film poster
- Directed by: Juan Carlos de Llaca
- Written by: Juan Carlos de Llaca; Vicente Leñero; Sebastian Borensztein
- Starring: Alfonso Herrera; Mauricio Isaac; Irene Azuela; Patricio Castillo; Delia Casanova; Silverio Palacios
- Cinematography: Estean de Llaca
- Music by: Leoncio Lara
- Release date: August 19, 2011
- Country: Mexico
- Language: Spanish

Así es la suerte (lit. 'So is luck') is a 2011 Mexican comedy film, written, produced and directed by Juan Carlos de Llaca and starring Alfonso Herrera, Mauricio Isaac and Irene Azuela. It was released on August 19, 2011.

== Plot ==
Ramiro is a theater actor who lives away from his father and his half brother. One morning he meets a suicidal who claims to be a bird of ill omen. Despite his efforts, the young man dies in front of Ramiro and is stuck with the idea of being infected by bad luck. From that moment his life is turned upside down, while he is reunited with his family to fulfill the last wishes of his father: find the love of his life to say goodbye.

== Cast ==
- Alfonso Herrera - Guillermo
- Mauricio Isaac - Ramiro
- Irene Azuela - Mónica
- Patricio Castillo - Vicente
- Delia Casanova - Lidia
- Silverio Palacios - Brujo
- Ernesto Gómez Cruz - Lidia's husband
- Moises Arizmendi
- Alejandro Calva - Director
- José Sefami
- Pilar Ixquic Mata
- Fabiana Perzabal
