= Mabel Cadena =

Mexican actress (born 1990)

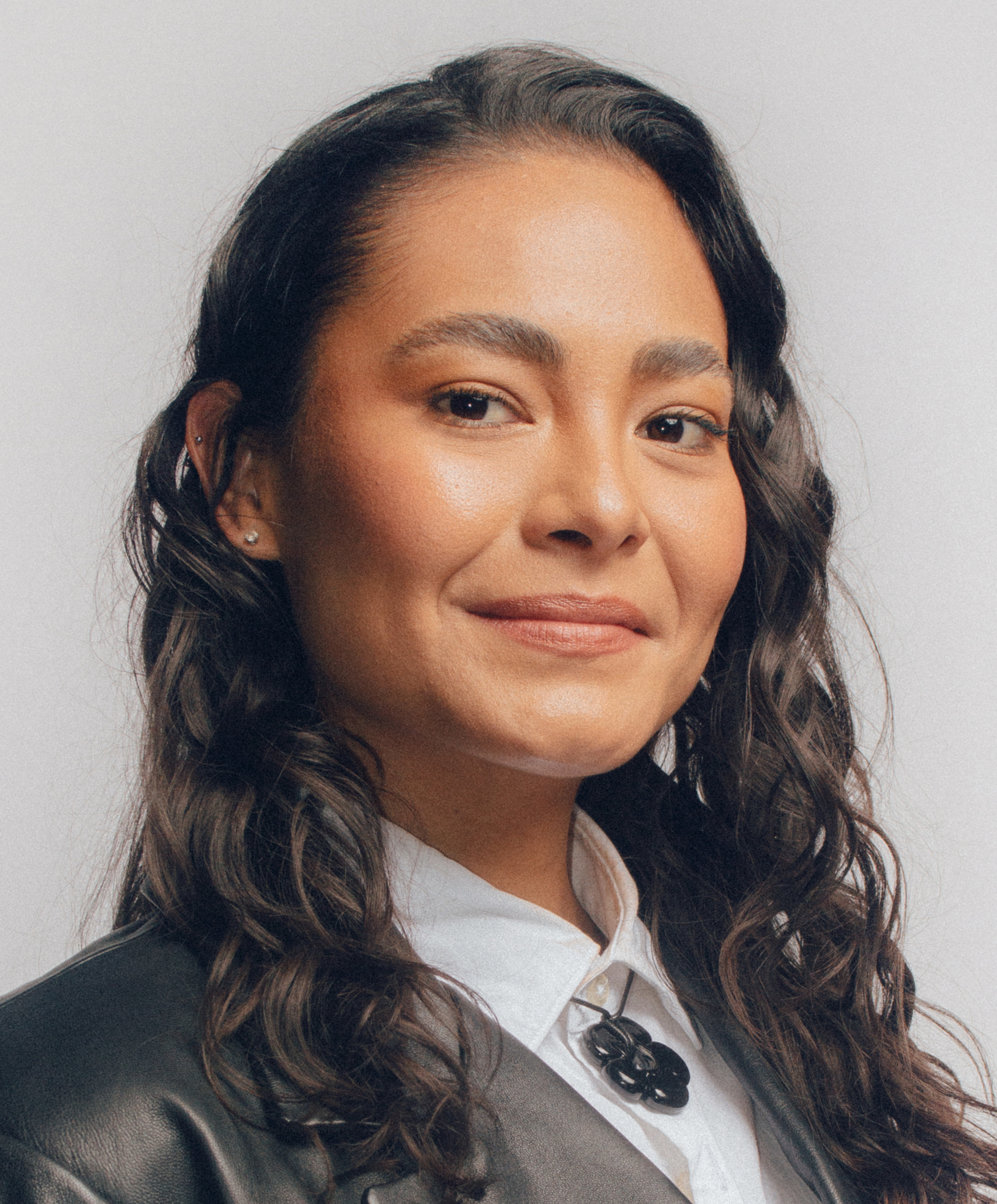
- Cadena in 2024
- Born: Mitzi Mabel Martínez Cadena; 23 September 1990 (age 36); Atizapán, State of Mexico, Mexico
- Education: Universidad Veracruzana
- Occupation: Actress
- Website: www.mabelcadena.com

Mitzi Mabel Martínez Cadena (born 23 September 1990) is a Mexican actress known for starring in the 2020 films Dance of the 41 and La diosa del asfalto, as well as the 2019 television series Hernán. She made her Hollywood debut playing Namora in the 2022 film Black Panther: Wakanda Forever.

== Early life and education ==
Mabel Cadena was born in Atizapán de Zaragoza on 23 September 1990, and grew up in Minatitlán, Veracruz. She studied for a licentiate in psychology at the Universidad Veracruzana. She began her acting training at the CasAzul Artes Escénicas Argos academy in Tlalnepantla de Baz.

== Career ==
After acting in some plays, Cadena shifted to television in 2012, playing the role of Adela Rosa Chávez in the HBO series Capadocia. Her TV career continued in productions such as Camelia la Texana (2014), El Señor de los Cielos (2014), Érase una vez (2017), Las Malcriadas (2017), El Vato (2017), Ingobernable (2017), Por la máscara (2018), La Bandida (2018), and Monarca (2019). Despite some initial misgivings, she learned to speak Nahuatl to play the role of Tecuelhuetzin in the 2019 series Hernán.

Just when I had the first rehearsal with the director, I panicked. I came home to cry, because it is not the same to act in a language that is yours; you master and you know it.

She ventured into cinema with The Eternal Feminine (2017), La diosa del asfalto (2020) by Julián Hernández, and Dance of the 41 (2020) by David Pablos. The latter gained her fame in Mexico when she portrayed Amada Díaz, stepdaughter of Porfirio Díaz. Among the short films in which she has appeared are Menage à trois (2015), Cuatro Minutos (2021), and Venganza póstuma (2022).

Cadena made her Hollywood debut in 2022 with the Marvel Studios film Black Panther: Wakanda Forever in the role of Namora, cousin of Namor. She will reprise the role in Avengers: Doomsday (2026).

== Filmography ==
=== Films ===
Year	Title	Role	Notes
2015	Ménage à Trois	Cris	Short film
2016	The Eternal Feminine		
2018	Dos veces tú	Nurse	
2020	La diosa del asfalto	Ramira	
2020	Dance of the 41	Amada Díaz	
2021	Cuatro Minutos	Girl	Short film
2022	Black Panther: Wakanda Forever	Namora	
2022	Venganza póstuma	Short film	
2025	Alexander and the Terrible, Horrible, No Good, Very Bad Road Trip	Lupe	
2026	Avengers: Doomsday †	Namora	Post-production

=== Television series ===
Year	Title	Role
2012	Rosa diamante	La Caimana
2012	Capadocia	Adela Rosa Chávez
2014	Camelia la Texana	Valeria
2014	El Señor de los Cielos	Mercedes
2017	Érase una vez	Evelina
2017	Las Malcriadas	Juana Ortiz
2017	El Vato	Meche
2017	Ingobernable	Citlalli López
2018	Por la máscara	Usnavy
2018	La Bandida	Pilar
2019	Hernán	Doña Luisa / Tecuelhuetzin
2019	Monarca	Itzel
2021	Not My Fault: Mexico	Julia
2022	Señorita 89	Nora
2022	Los enviados	Helena Flores
2023	Drag Race México	Herself / Guest judge

== Awards and nominations ==
Year	Award	Category	Work	Result	Ref.
2021	Ariel Award	Best Leading Actress	Dance of the 41	Nominated	
2022	Ariel Award	Best Supporting Actress	La diosa del asfalto	Nominated	
