= Los simuladores (Mexican TV series) =

TV series 2008–2009

- Based on: Los simuladores by Damián Szifron
- Starring: Arath de la Torre; Alejandro Calva; Rubén Zamora; Tony Dalton
- Country of origin: Mexico
- Original language: Spanish
- No. of seasons: 2
- No. of episodes: 32

Production
- Production companies: Sony Pictures Television International; Televisa

Original release
- Network: Sony Entertainment Television
- Release: 6 May 2008 – 13 November 2009

Los simuladores is a Mexican television series produced by Sony Pictures Television International for Televisa. It is an adaptation on the Argentine serie of the same name created by Damián Szifron, and stars Arath de la Torre, Alejandro Calva, Rubén Zamora, and Tony Dalton.

== Cast ==
- Arath de la Torre as Emilio Vargas
- Alejandro Calva as Pablo López
- Rubén Zamora as Gabriel Medina
- Tony Dalton as Mario Santos

== Episodes ==
=== Series overview ===
Series	Episodes	Originally released	
Series	Episodes	First released	Last released
1	13	6 May 2008	29 July 2008
2	18	17 July 2009	13 November 2009

=== Season 1 (2008) ===
No. overall	No. in season	Title	Directed by	Original release date
1	1	"Segunda oportunidad"	Alejandro Lozano	6 May 2008
2	2	"Colonoscopia"	Álvaro Curiel	13 May 2008
3	3	"Recursos humanos"	Jorge Ramírez Suárez	20 May 2008
4	4	"Acosada"	Álvaro Curiel	27 May 2008
5	5	"El joven simulador"	Javier Solar	3 June 2008
6	6	"Los impresentables"	Álvaro Curiel	10 June 2008
7	7	"Operación ocelote"	Javier Solar	17 June 2008
8	8	"El pacto copernico"	Álvaro Curiel	24 June 2008
9	9	"Asuntos de poder"	Javier Solar	1 July 2008
10	10	"El colaborador foráneo"	Álvaro Curiel	8 July 2008
11	11	"La Fan"	Javier Solar	15 July 2008
12	12	"Reality"	Álvaro Curiel	22 July 2008
13	13	"El secuestro de Santos"	Javier Solar	29 July 2008

=== Season 2 (2009) ===
No. overall	No. in season	Title	Directed by	Original release date
14	1	"El plagio"	Javier Solar	17 July 2009
