= The Chosen (2016 film) =

- Directed by: Antonio Chavarrías
- Written by: Antonio Chavarrías; Dominic Harari; Teresa Pelegri
- Story by: Antonio Chavarrías
- Starring: Alfonso Herrera; Hannah Murray; Henry Goodman; Julian Sands
- Cinematography: Guillermo Granillo
- Music by: Arnau Bataller
- Release date: 2 September 2016
- Countries: Mexico; Spain
- Languages: Spanish; English

The Chosen (Spanish: El elegido) is a 2016 Spanish-Mexican thriller drama film written and directed by Antonio Chavarrías. The film stars Hannah Murray, Alfonso Herrera, Julian Sands and Henry Goodman. The movie was filmed in Coyoacán, Mexico and Barcelona, Spain, and its release was scheduled for the first part of 2016. The film is based on the murder of Leon Trotsky in 1940.

== Cast ==
- Alfonso Herrera as Ramón Mercader
- Hannah Murray as Sylvia Ageloff
- Henry Goodman as Leon Trotsky
- Julian Sands as Kotov
- Frances Barber as Natalia
- Emilio Echevarría as Coronel Salazar
- Alejandro Calva as David Alfaro Siqueiros
- Elvira Mínguez as Caridad del Río
- Roger Casamajor as Carles Vidal
- Javier Godino as Costa
- Alexander Holtmann as Sheldon
- Brontis Jodorowsky as Otto

== Reception ==
The Chosen received a 40% fresh rating on the Rotten Tomatoes review aggregator website. Andrea G. Bermejo, film reviewer for the Spanish newspaper El Mundo, gave the film three out of five stars, praising the performances of Alfonso Herrera and Hannah Murray. The Hollywood Reporter's Jonathan Holland wrote that Chavarrias' script covered the historical information "clearly and simply, and without over-falsifying the historical events," but the main character, Ramon Mercader, was "less interesting and a far cry from Alain Delon’s chilling depiction in Joseph Losey’s flawed The Assassination of Trotsky." The World Socialist Web Site's David Walsh, on the other hand, compared The Chosen favorably to Losey's "cold, unpleasant work," and praised Chavarrias' historical research and the script's characterization of Mercader.
