= Dance of the 41 (film) =

- Spanish: El baile de los 41
- Directed by: David Pablos
- Written by: Monika Revilla
- Produced by: Pablo Cruz
- Starring: Alfonso Herrera
- Cinematography: Carolina Costa
- Production companies: Canana Films; El Estudio; Bananeira Filmes
- Release date: 1 November 2020 (Morelia)
- Running time: 99 minutes
- Country: Mexico
- Language: Spanish

Dance of the 41 (Spanish: El baile de los 41) is a 2020 Mexican drama film directed by David Pablos, written by Monika Revilla and produced by Pablo Cruz and El Estudio. It portrays the events leading up to and around a 1901 party of gay men, half of whom were dressed in drag, known as the Dance of the Forty-One (El baile de los cuarenta y uno).

It stars Alfonso Herrera as Ignacio de la Torre y Mier, the gay son-in-law of then-president of Mexico Porfirio Díaz, Mabel Cadena as Amada Díaz, his illegitimate daughter, and Emiliano Zurita (son of Christian Bach) as Ignacio's fictional lover, Evaristo Rivas.

== Plot ==
The film is based on the Dance of the Forty-One which was a society scandal in early 20th-century Mexico. The incident revolved around an illegal police raid carried out on 17 November 1901 in a private home in Mexico City. The scandal involved the group of men who attended, 19 of whom were dressed in women's clothing. Despite the government's efforts to hush the incident up, the press was keen to report the incident, since the participants belonged to the upper echelons of society (including the son-in-law of the incumbent President of Mexico). This scandal was unique in that it was the first time homosexuality was openly spoken about in the Mexican media and had a lasting impact on Mexican culture.

== Cast ==
- Alfonso Herrera as Ignacio de la Torre y Mier
- Mabel Cadena as Amada Díaz
- Emiliano Zurita as Evaristo Rivas
- Fernando Becerril as Porfirio Díaz
- Paulina Álvarez Muñoz as Luz Díaz
- Alan Downie as the English butler

== Filming locations ==
The movie was filmed in Mexico City and Guadalajara at the end of 2019. Some filming locations include the Rivas Mercado House, the bar La Opera in Mexico City's historic center and many of the exteriors were filmed in the streets of Guadalajara.

The mansion used to represent the Ignacio de la Torre House is the Casa Rivas Mercado, in Colonia Guerrero, Mexico City, which represents similar eclectic late-19th-century architecture of urban mansions in the area and functions as a cultural center. The actual Ignacio de la Torre mansion was located where the National Lottery building is now located at Paseo de la Reforma number 1. The Equestrian statue of Charles IV of Spain, better known as "El Caballito", was located in front of the house at that time.

== Premiere and distribution ==
The movie's premiere was on 1 November 2020 at the closing event of the Morelia International Film Festival.

The premiere for the general public was on 19 November 2020 at Cinépolis cinemas in Mexico.

The film premiered on Netflix worldwide on 12 May 2021.

== Accolades ==
Year	Award	Category	Recipient	Result	Ref.
2021	Ariel Award	Best Picture	Pablo Cruz and Arturo Sampson	Nominated	
2021	Ariel Award	Best Director	David Pablos	Nominated	
2021	Ariel Award	Best Actor	Alfonso Herrera	Won	
2021	Ariel Award	Best Actress	Mabel Cadena	Nominated	
2021	Ariel Award	Best Supporting Actor	Emiliano Zurita	Nominated	
2021	Ariel Award	Best Cinematography	Carolina Costa	Nominated	
2021	Ariel Award	Best Special Effects	Ricardo Arvizu	Nominated	
2021	Ariel Award	Best Visual Effects	Alma Cabrián and John Castro	Nominated	
2021	Ariel Award	Best Art Direction	Daniela Schneider	Won	
2021	Ariel Award	Best Makeup	Alfredo "Tigre" Mora	Won	
2021	Ariel Award	Best Costume Design	Kika Lopes	Won	
2021	Ariel Award	Best Original Song	Carlo Ayhllón and Andrea Balency-Béarn	Nominated	
