= Fortuna (TV series) =

- Developed by: Argos Comunicación; Cadena Tres
- Starring: Andrés Palacios; Lisette Morelos; Alejandro de la Madrid
- Country of origin: Mexico
- Original language: Spanish

Production
- Camera setup: Multi-camera
- Running time: 42-45 minutes

Original release
- Network: Cadena Tres
- Release: April 22 – October 18, 2013

Fortuna is a Mexican Spanish language telenovela produced by Argos Television for Cadena Tres. It stars Andrés Palacios and Lisette Morelos.

== Cast ==
Main Cast

Actor	Character Original character	Description
Andrés Palacios	Gabriel Altamirano Ledesma	Son of Mercedes and Adolfo, distinguished lawyer who works with traditional rural residents
Lisette Morelos	Alicia Altamirano	Daughter of Minerva and Adolfo, had a relationship with Jerónimo
Anna Ciocchetti	Minerva Constant de Altamirano	Son Wife of Adolfo, mother of Alicia
Marco Treviño	Adolfo Altamirano 'El Zar'	Husband of Minerva, lover of Mercedes, wealthy, eccentric and mysterious businessman
Claudia Ramírez	Mercedes Ledesma	Second woman of Adolfo, mother of Andres
Manuel Balbi	Jerónimo Durán	Adopted son of Altamirano, confidant of Adolfo, had a relationship with Alicia
Ari Brickman	Sergei Ilianov	Belarusian, former KGB agent and son of a military father, paranoid and overly neat
Mimi Morales	Carolina Ledesma Gil	Daughter of Mercedes and Adolfo, strong and determined as Mercedes
Estela Calderón	Elizabeth 'Liz' Méndez	A beautiful, smart, cunning, was escort for 17 years
Alejandro de la Madrid	Roberto Altamirano	Son of Adolfo and Minerva, natural born seducer, worked alongside his father for many years and has prepared all his life to inherit the casino
Alexander Holtmann	Luka Gomorov	Russian gangster, Adolfo's rival and Mercedes Lover
Néstor Rodulfo	Ernesto Villaurrutia	
Iliana Fox	Florencia Lizalde	
Marco Zetina	Leonel Canseco	
José María Soane	Ministro Solares	
Constantino Costas	Darío Casasola	
Citlali Galindo	Violetta de Casasola	
Saturnino Martínez	Dr. Gerardo Rubio	
