= Nina Sicilia =

Venezuelan model and beauty queen

- Born: Alejandrina Sicilia Hernández; December 3, 1962 (age 63); Caracas, Venezuela
- Other name: Nina Sicilia
- Beauty pageant titleholder
- Title: Miss Venezuela International 1985; Miss International 1985
- Major competitions: Miss Venezuela 1985 (1st runner-up) (Miss Venezuela International) (Miss Elegance); Miss International 1985 (Winner)

Alejandrina “Nina” Sicilia Hernández (born December 3, 1962) is a Venezuelan model and beauty queen who was crowned Miss International 1985 in Japan. she was the first Miss International from Venezuela.

== Career ==
Born in Caracas, Venezuela, she represented the Monagas State in the Miss Venezuela pageant in 1985, winning the special band of Miss Elegance and the place of First Finalist, enabling her to represent Venezuela in the Miss International pageant. In August 1985 she won the pageant, becoming the first Venezuelan ever to win it.

In addition, Nina Sicilia is a pianist; she studied at the Juan José Landaeta National Conservatory of Music in Caracas, complementing her ten years of piano with studies in theory and music theory, music history, harmony and composition.

Throughout her artistic career, she has developed as an entertainer of special and variety programs for television Venevisión and for the chain Univisión. Similarly, she was the official animator of the organization Miss World Colombia for more than ten years and worked as a presenter for Venezuela in the series of special summer programs de Galicia para el Mundo in Spain. Nina has been, for several consecutive years, Jury of La Magia de ser Miss, a series of programs leading up to Miss Venezuela, where the candidates' hertrionic, musical, and oratory talents — among others — are evaluated. She's additionally a preparer of misses and models. Currently, she works as a presenter of Special Events nationally and internationally.

Regarding her training and professional performance, Nina Sicilia has a degree in Business Administration, graduated from the Universidad Católica Andrés Bello in Caracas, complementing her training with the Advanced Management Program of the IESA, also certifying in Total Quality Management by Objectives and Strategic Planning.

Nina Sicilia started out as finance manager of a renowned financial company, later joining the Cisneros Group in which, over the course of 30 years, she has developed her professional career both at the corporate level and in different group companies. She was treasury manager at Yukery Venezolana de Alimentos, finance manager at Directv, finance and marketing director at Business Services Provider de Venezuela and director at Caracas Baseball Club, companies where she has obtained extensive managerial and administrative experience. Nina Sicilia was also the CEO of an international online training and leadership company and works simultaneously as a motivational coach and image consultant for different companies and institutions.

Since April 17, 2018, she has held the position of general manager of Miss Venezuela, forming part of the executive and directive committee of said organization, and successfully carried out its own Image and Style Master Class, transmitting its wide experience and knowledge to different audiences and empowering girls and young people for the future.

== Personal life ==
In 1987, Nina Sicilia married the Venezuelan businessman Julio Arnaldes Zava, with whom she has two children.

She works in Venevisión as TV Anchor, and as manager in a Caracas marketing company.

== See also ==
- Miss Venezuela

Awards and achievements
Preceded by (Guatemala) Ilma Urrutia	Miss International; 1985	Succeeded by (England) Helen Fairbrother
Preceded by Miriam Leyderman	Miss Venezuela International; 1985	Succeeded by Nancy Gallardo
Preceded by María Morales	Miss Monagas; 1985	Succeeded by Carolina Pacheco
