= Ignacio de la Torre y Mier =

Mexican politician and businessperson

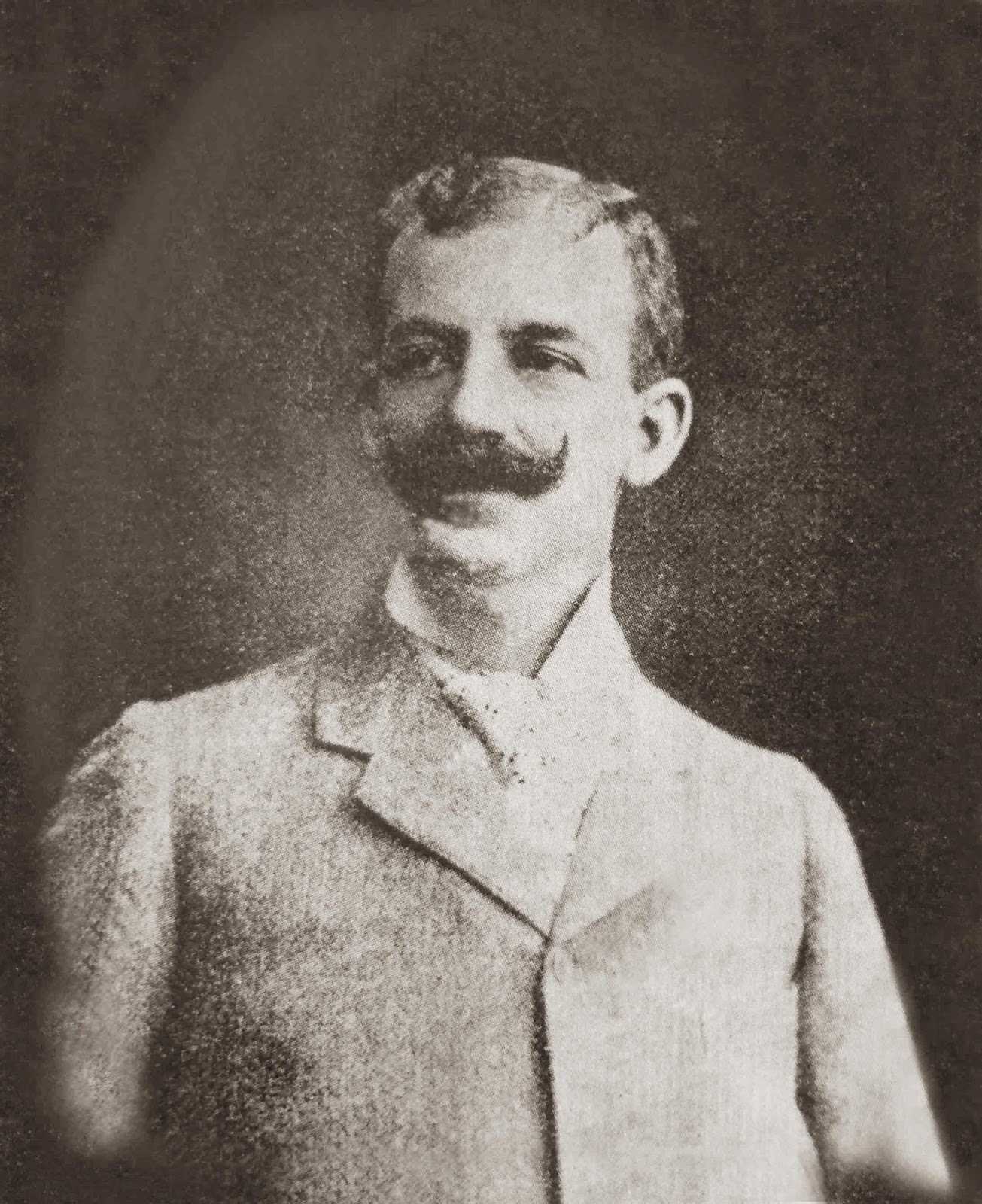
- Ignacio de la Torre y Mier, c. 1900
- Born: July 25, 1866; Mexico City, Mexico
- Died: April 1, 1918 (aged 51)
- Spouse: Amada Díaz
- Relatives: Prince Pierre, Duke of Valentinois (nephew)

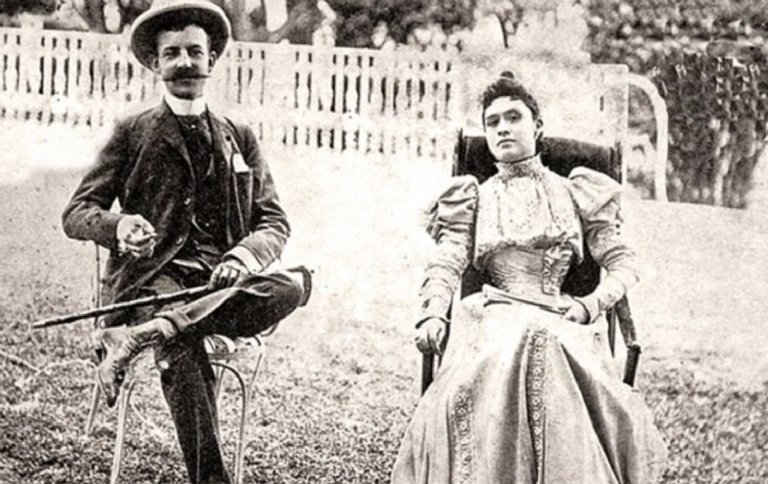
Ignacio and Amada Diaz, c. 1900

José Ignacio Mariano Santiago Joaquín Francisco de la Torre y Mier (July 25, 1866 – April 1, 1918) was a Mexican businessman, politician and owner of a hacienda, the son-in-law of Porfirio Díaz, then president of Mexico, married to his eldest daughter, Amada Díaz. His nickname was "El Yerno de su Suegro" (His father-in-law's son-in-law).

== Early life ==
Ignacio de la Torre was born on June 25, 1866, in a house in the Historic center of Mexico City. He was the youngest of 7 children of the sugar businessman from El Puerto de Santa María, Spain, Isidoro Fernando José Máximo de la Torre Carsí (1818–1881), founder of the company Jecker-Torre, responsible for issuing the bonds which would result in the French intervention in Mexico; and his wife, María Luisa de los Ángeles Mier Celis (1830–1866). Ignacio de la Torre Mier's father was a rich hacienda owner; he came to own 10 plantations and lived with his family in the Palace of the Marqués del Apartado. Ignacio was educated in the best schools in Mexico and the United States. His father died in France on August 28, 1881, and left Ignacio as an inheritance the hacienda of Santiago Tenextepango, in Ayala, Morelos. It was one of the most productive of its day, 16,000 hectares (40,000 acres) in size, producing sugar cane. After the Cuban War of Independence, Morelos started to compete with Hawaii and Puerto Rico; motivating De la Torre to invest in his plantations. De la Torre had a trading company to sell and export his products, which drew positive attention from president Porfirio Díaz.

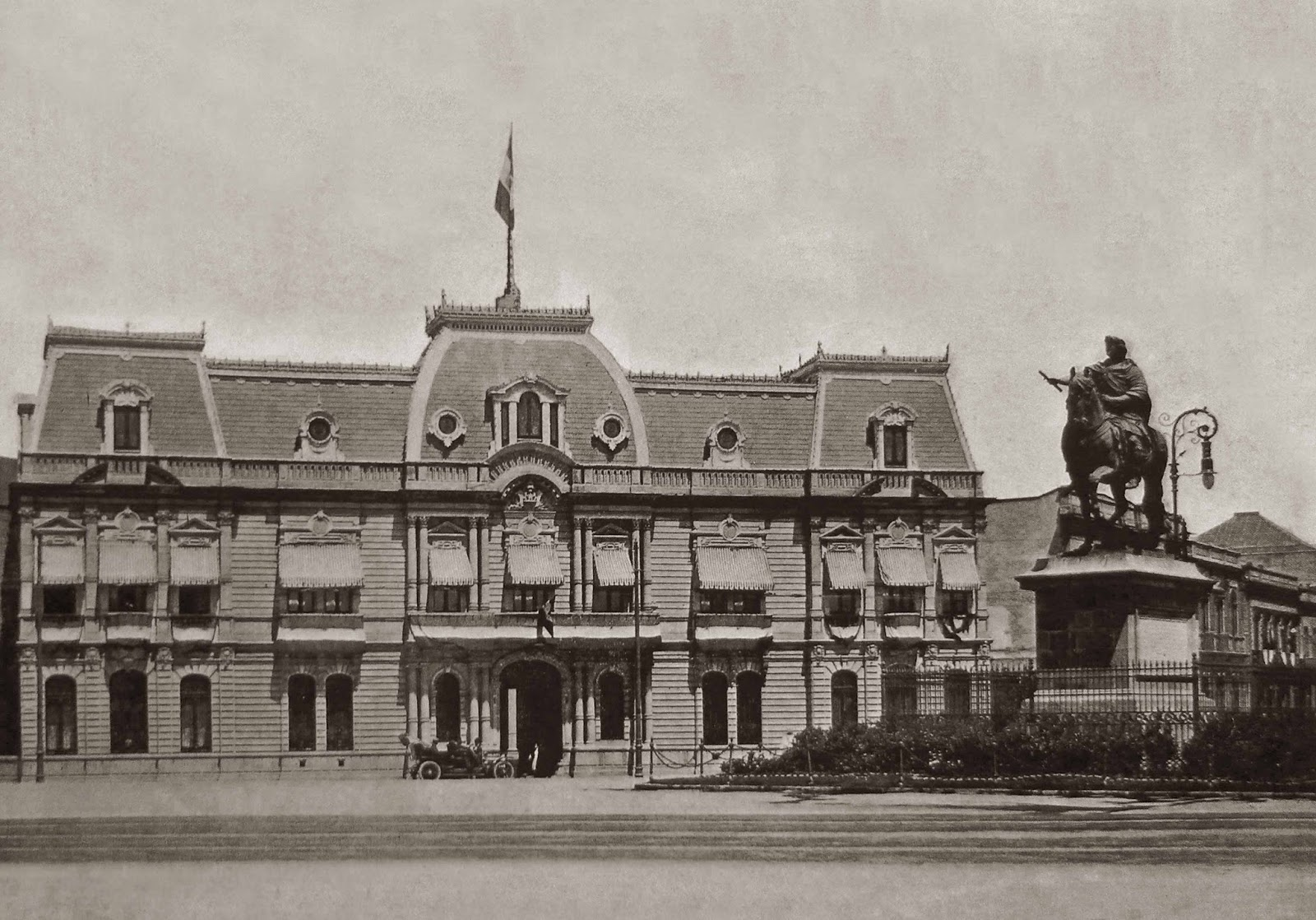
The Second Empire-style Ignacio de la Torre y Mier mansion, which stood on the site of the current National Lottery building at the north corner of Paseo de la Reforma and Av. República. The Equestrian statue of Charles IV of Spain ("El Caballito") has since been moved to Plaza Manuel Tolsá

On January 16, 1888, he married Amada Díaz, daughter of president Porfirio Díaz, conceived out of wedlock with an indigenous woman from Huamuxtitlán, Guerrero named Rafaela Quiñones. Ignacio met Amada at a dance in Spring, 1887. After a brief courtship, they were married by archbishop Pelagio Antonio de Labastida y Dávalos.

The Second Empire-style Ignacio de la Torre y Mier mansion stood on the site of the current National Lottery building at the north corner of Paseo de la Reforma and Av. República. The house was used as Lottery headquarters and was then demolished to build the skyscraper that currently stands in its place. The Equestrian statue of Charles IV of Spain ("El Caballito") has since been moved to Plaza Manuel Tolsá.

He was a co-owner, with Porfirio Díaz and Juan Llamedo, of the Banco de Londres y México.

Ignacio de la Torre was the maternal uncle of Pierre de Polignac, the Prince Consort of Monaco, son of his elder sister Susana (1858–1913).

== Sexuality ==
On November 18, 1901, the police raided a cross dressing ball known as the Baile de los cuarenta y uno, or Dance of the Forty-One, where 41 men were arrested. There were rumors that De la Torre was in attendance and escaped punishment since he was the president's son-in-law. This has continued as a belief in popular culture and has led to him being called number "42".

== Depictions in culture ==
Ignacio de la Torre was played by Alfonso Herrera in the Mexican movie Dance of the 41 in 2020.
