= El Equipo =

- Genre: Telenovela
- Starring: Alberto Estrella; Zuria Vega; Alfonso Herrera; Fabián Robles; Roberto Blandon
- Country of origin: México
- Original language: Spanish
- No. of seasons: 1
- No. of episodes: 15

Production
- Executive producer: Pedro Torres
- Running time: 30 minutes
- Production company: Televisa

Original release
- Network: Canal de las Estrellas
- Release: May 9 – May 27, 2011

El Equipo (The Team) is a Mexican series starring Alfonso Herrera, Zuria Vega, Alberto Estrella and Fabián Robles are the protagonists. Is a series that blends action, drama, love, and shows the work and effort of the Mexican federal police, who every day risk their lives to protect society against mafias and drug cartels. The story centers around Santiago, Fermin, Magda and Mateo, who at one time in his life made the decision to become a Federal Police officer. In each chapter, the team will solve a different case where we can see the intelligence process, the operation and the capture of the offender while the characters must face their feelings and solve their own problems of everyday life. A blockbuster inspired by real events, produced by Pedro Torres and directed by Carlos Garcia Agraz and Chava Cartas.

== Cast ==
- Alberto Estrella as Santiago Quiron, Team Policia Federal
- Alfonso Herrera as Fermin Perez, Team Policia Federal
- Zuria Vega as Magda Saenz, Team Policia Federal
- Fabián Robles as Mateo Acona, Team Policia Federal
- Roberto Blandon as El Jefe Sigma, police chief of Policia Federal, killed in line of duty. +
- Marisol del Olmo as Natalia
- Flavio Medina as Elisha Raya
- Adanely Núñez as Lucila
- Claudia Alvarez as Pilar
- Manuel Ojeda
- Mario Casillas as El Deme
- Luis Couturier as Don Lorenzo
- Luis Uribe as Carlos Raúl Quinzaños
- Juan Carlos Barreto as El Vale
- Ramon Valdez as Fernandez, Team Policia Federal
- Arturo Posada as Otero, Team Policia Federal
- Marco Uriel as El Mister
- José Montini as "Gordo Palette"

== Reception ==
Álvaro Cueva, a television critic, wrote in the newspaper Milenio (as translated by the New York Times), said the series "painted our police like a bunch of unprofessional people who don’t even respect their own protocols, who make decisions impulsively and don’t care if they unloose bloodshed so long as they get what they want”
