= Drunk History (Mexican TV series) =

Mexican television series

- Genre: Education; Comedy
- Based on: Drunk History by Derek Waters
- Written by: David Hernández Miranda; Mario Santiago Jiménez; Jerry Rodríguez Burckle; Fran Hevia
- Directed by: Leonardo Rodríguez; Jerry Rodríguez Burckle; Marco Romano
- Presented by: Eugenio Derbez
- Country of origin: Mexico
- Original language: Spanish
- No. of seasons: 3
- No. of episodes: 21

Production
- Executive producer: Omar Rodríguez
- Production company: Viacom

Original release
- Network: Comedy Central
- Release: 8 February 2016 – 30 October 2017

Related
- Drunk History (UK); Drunk History Australia

Drunk History: El lado borroso de la historia, or simply Drunk History, is a Mexican adaptation of the American television series of the same name, which in turn is based on the web series from Funny or Die. The series revolves around a narrator, who with his favorite alcoholic beverage, recounts a historical episode in front of the camera. Each story is interpreted by a group of actors that tries to represent the occurrences of the drunk. The series premiered on 8 February 2016 on Comedy Central Latin America.

== Cast ==
=== Regular cast ===
- Eugenio Derbez as Himself
- Javier Noriega as Various roles

=== Notable guest stars ===
- Alfonso Herrera as Aquiles Serdán / Ernesto "Che" Guevara
- Marco Treviño as Porfirio Díaz
- Roberto Flores as Fidel Castro
- Bruno Bichir as Cristóbal Colón
- Ana de la Reguera as Amada Diaz
- Luis Gerardo Méndez as Hernán Cortés
- Ana Claudia Talancón as La Güera Rodríguez
- Gerardo Taracena as Nezahualcóyotl
- Roberto Sosa as Agustín Lara
- Jesús Zavala as Joselito
- Liz Gallardo as Frida Kahlo
- Miguel Rodarte as Antonio López de Santa Anna
- Christian Tappan as Flaco
- Alejandro Calva as Miguel Hidalgo
- María del Carmen Félix as María Félix
- Ianis Guerrero as Zapata
- Erick Elías as Ávila Camacho
- Christian Vázquez as Emiliano Zapata
- Sofia Niño de Rivera as Herself
- Erik Hayser as Gonzalo Guerrero
- Viviana Serna as Manuela Sáenz
- Héctor Berzunza as Simón Bolívar
- Irving Dublín as Guard

== Episodes ==
=== Series overview ===
Series	Episodes	Originally released	
Series	Episodes	First released	Last released
1	4	8 February 2016	29 February 2016
2	9	5 September 2016	7 November 2016
3	8	11 September 2017	30 October 2017

=== Season 1 (2016) ===
No. overall	No. in season	Title	Directed by	Written by	Original release date
1	1	"Yerno Incómodo, Trotsky en México, Hidalgo contra Allende"	Jerry Rodríguez Burckle & Leonardo Rodríguez	Jerry Rodríguez Burckle & David Hernández Miranda	8 February 2016
2	2	"Cortés y la Malinche, El presidente y los Espíritus, La pierna de Santa Anna"	Jerry Rodríguez Burckle & Leonardo Rodríguez	Jerry Rodríguez Burckle & David Hernández Miranda	15 February 2016
3	3	"La Coronela, La revolución del Che, El Florero de Llorente"	Jerry Rodríguez Burckle & Leonardo Rodríguez	Jerry Rodríguez Burckle & David Hernández Miranda	22 February 2016
4	4	"El eclipse de Colón, Agustín Lara y María Félix, La espada de Bolívar"	Jerry Rodríguez Burckle & Leonardo Rodríguez	Jerry Rodríguez Burckle & David Hernández Miranda	29 February 2016

=== Season 2 (2016) ===
No. overall	No. in season	Title	Directed by	Written by	Original release date
5	1	"El Himno Nacional Mexicano, La Leyenda de "El Pípila", Las Verdades de Colón"	Jerry Rodríguez Burckle & Leonardo Rodríguez	David Hernández Miranda, Fran Hevia & Jerry Rodríguez Burckle	5 September 2016
6	2	"Los niños héroes, Encuentro en Guayaquil"	Jerry Rodríguez Burckle	David Hernández Miranda, Fran Hevia & Jerry Rodríguez Burckle	12 September 2016
7	3	"Santa vs. Quetzalcóatl, La muerte de Juárez, Malverde"	Jerry Rodríguez Burckle & Leonardo Rodríguez	David Hernández Miranda, Fran Hevia & Jerry Rodríguez Burckle	19 September 2016
8	4	"Batalla del 5 de mayo, El exilio de Hitler, La banda del automóvil gris"	Jerry Rodríguez Burckle, Marco Romano & Leonardo Rodríguez	David Hernández Miranda, Fran Hevia & Jerry Rodríguez Burckle	26 September 2016
9	5	"La Patagonia, María Sabina"	Leonardo Rodríguez	David Hernández Miranda, Fran Hevia & Jerry Rodríguez Burckle	3 October 2016
10	6	"Juan Diego y La Virgen, Kennedy y López Mateos, La Pola"	Leonardo Rodríguez	David Hernández Miranda, Fran Hevia & Jerry Rodríguez Burckle	10 October 2016
11	7	"El origen de nuestra nación, Eva Perón"	Jerry Rodríguez Burckle & Leonardo Rodríguez	David Hernández Miranda, Fran Hevia & Jerry Rodríguez Burckle	17 October 2016
12	8	"Pancho Villa en Hollywood, Los hermanos Rodríguez, Sor Juana"	Leonardo Rodríguez & Marco Romano	David Hernández Miranda, Fran Hevia & Jerry Rodríguez Burckle	24 October 2016
13	9	"Chucho El Roto, El Dorado"	Leonardo Rodríguez & Marco Romano	David Hernández Miranda, Fran Hevia & Jerry Rodríguez Burckle	7 November 2016

=== Season 3 (2017) ===
No. overall	No. in season	Title	Directed by	Written by	Original release date
14	1	"Villa y Zapata y la silla presidencial, La Güera Rodríguez y Fray Tormenta"	Jerry Rodríguez Burckle & Leonardo Rodríguez	Fran Hevia & Mario Santiago Jiménez	11 September 2017
15	2	"La locura de Carlota, Hermanos Serdán, WWII"	Jerry Rodríguez Burckle	Fran Hevia & Mario Santiago Jiménez	18 September 2017
16	3	"Iturbide, Nezahualcóyotl y La invención del Bolígrafo"	Jerry Rodríguez Burckle	Fran Hevia & Mario Santiago Jiménez	18 September 2017
17	4	"Niño santo, Jamaicón y La libertadora del Libertador"	Leonardo Rodríguez & Marco Romano	Fran Hevia & Mario Santiago Jiménez	25 September 2017
18	5	"El español maya y La mano de Obregón"	Jerry Rodríguez Burckle	Fran Hevia & Mario Santiago Jiménez	2 October 2017
19	6	"El Tigre de Santa Julia, Papa Doc, Gardel"	Jerry Rodríguez Burckle, Leonardo Rodríguez & Marco Romano	Fran Hevia & Mario Santiago Jiménez	9 October 2017
20	7	"La historia del mole y Miss viuda negra"	Jerry Rodríguez Burckle	Fran Hevia & Mario Santiago Jiménez	16 October 2017
21	8	"Zovek, Rey Lagarto y Lombardo"	Jerry Rodríguez Burckle, Leonardo Rodríguez & Marco Romano	Fran Hevia & Mario Santiago Jiménez	30 October 2017
