= Ruddy Rodríguez =

Venezuelan actress, model and businesswoman (born 1967)

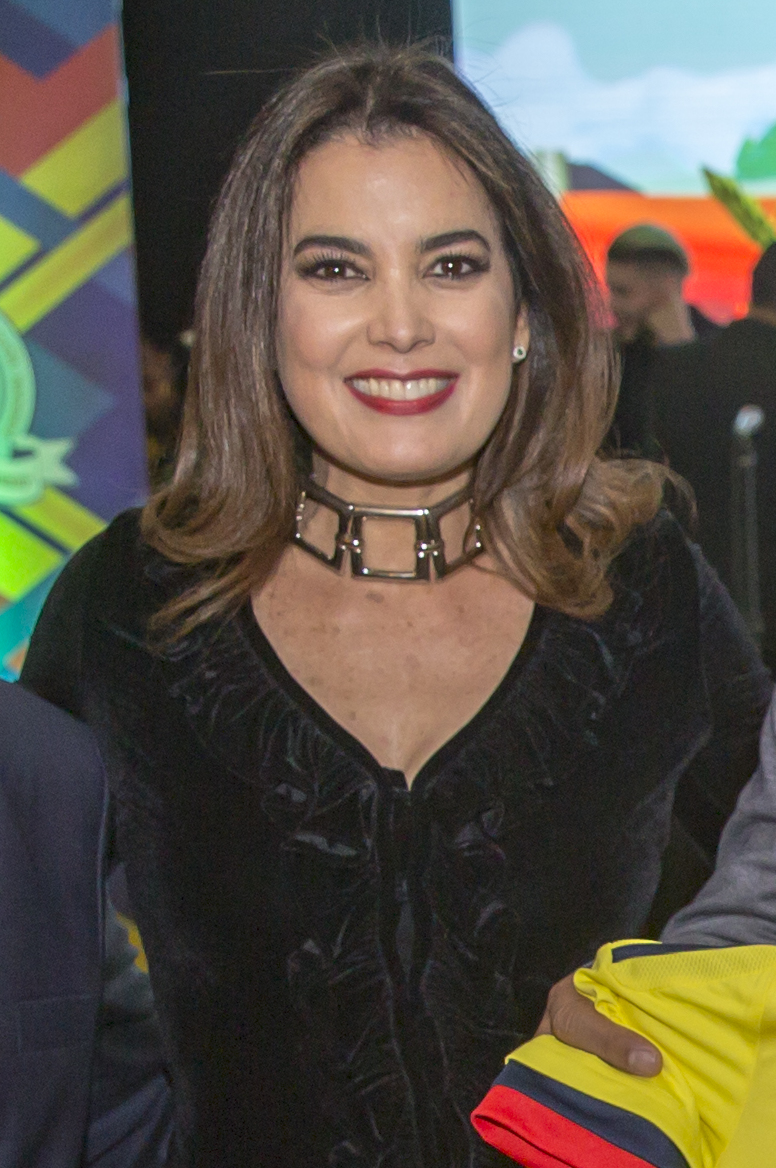
- Born: Ruddy Rosario Rodríguez de Lucía; March 20, 1967 (age 59); Anaco, Venezuela
- Height: 1.74 m (5 ft 9 in)

Ruddy Rosario Rodríguez de Lucía (Spanish pronunciation: [ˈruði roˈðɾiɣes]; born March 20, 1967) is a Venezuelan actress, businesswoman, model and beauty pageant titleholder who won Miss Venezuela World 1985. She represented Venezuela in the 1985 Miss World pageant in England where she placed in the top seven.

== Career ==
She made four calendars (1992, 1993, 1994 and 1995), being the first Venezuelan actress whose calendars were sold in other countries: Ecuador, Peru, Colombia and Russia.

=== Business ===
She once promoted a line of swim suits. Rodríguez is now promoting her own line of cosmetics. She has opened five stores: two in Caracas, one in Valencia, one in Ciudad Guayana and one in Bogotá known as "Ruddy Rodríguez Cosmetics". More stores are planned for Venezuela, Colombia, Ecuador and Miami.

=== Television ===
Ruddy Rodríguez is a popular actress in telenovelas (Latin American TV soap opera) and TV special series.

=== Theater ===
Before entering 1985 Miss Venezuela, Rodríguez performed small theater roles.

Since 1999 she has performing a monologue: "Una mujer con suerte" (A Lucky Woman), written by her brother Romano. This monologue has been presented in Venezuela, Colombia, Panama, Miami, Argentina, Ecuador. She hopes to translate this monologue into English in the future.

=== Hollywood ===
Rodríguez had a short appearance (45 seconds) in the 1987 James Bond film: The Living Daylights.

=== Twenty years of artistic career ===
Because of Ruddy Rodríguez's 20 years of artistic career, a party in her honor was organized at the Gavanna Night Club in Bogotá, Colombia on July 12, 2006. There were about 200 invitees from Colombia, Venezuela and Miami; at this party, she stated that her career as a telenovela actress was coming to an end in September 2006 after the taping of the last episode of the Colombian telenovela "La Ex" ("The Ex," or, "The Former Wife") was filmed. But after that date, she has since filmed several more telenovelas.

== Personal life ==
Although Rodríguez was born in Anaco, she grew up in Caracas where at the age of 15 she had her first boyfriend, her first kiss.

In 1985 after the Miss World Beauty Contest, she insisted on traveling to Italy to know her grandfather. She traveled with her brother Romano to Savinno, Naples in Italy and met their grandfather. Before their return, her grandfather said to her: porta a mia mamma perche io parto ad un lungo viaggio (Bring your mother, because I am going in a long trip), Ruddy went back to Venezuela, worked in her first telenovela, saved enough money and together with her mother Rita visited Italy again, stayed for 15 days and celebrated Ruddy's grandfather's 96th birthday. He died in peace the next day.

In July 1995 she married Rodolfo Pisani, a Venezuelan lawyer. They separated in 2005 and finally divorced on July 3, 2006, after more than ten years of marriage.

After a decade of being just friends, since November 2006 actress Ruddy Rodríguez lived a romance with Colombian rejoneador Juan Rafael Restrepo Bello, whom she married on October 1, 2011, in Colombia. On September 1, 2014, they separated "by mutual agreement", and got divorced January 23, 2015.

Because Ruddy and her sister Rina are look-alikes, when Rina was pregnant, many people mistakenly talked about Ruddy Rodríguez pregnancy.

She is daughter of Pedro José Rodríguez and Italian Rita de Lucía. She has a brother, Romano, and a sister, Rina.

=== Scientology ===
Since 2000, Ruddy Rodríguez has been a dedicated Scientologist.

She is an active member of the Fundación "El camino a la felicidad" (The Way to Happiness Foundation International), which promotes the booklet "The way to happiness", written by the founder of the Church of Scientology: L. Ronald Hubbard.

== Telenovelas and TV series ==
Telenovelas and TV series
Year	Title	Role	Notes
1986	"Enamorada" (In love)		Venezuela. Soap Opera
1986	"Inmensamente tuya" (Immensely Yours)		Venezuela. Soap Opera
1987	"Y La Luna Tambien" (The Moon Too)		Venezuela. Soap Opera.
1988	"Niña Bonita (telenovela)" (Pretty Girl)		Venezuela. Soap Opera.
1989	"Las Ibañez"		Colombia. 13 episode miniseries.
1989	"En Aquella Playa"		Puerto Rico. TV Movie.
1989	"Fabiola"		Venezuela. Soap Opera. Special guest for 10 episodes.
1989–1990	"El Magnate" (The Magnate)	Teresa	Crucilla, USA. Soap Opera.
1990–1991	Brigada Central	Claudia	Spain, Italy, France. 10 episode Miniseries.
1991	"Mala Mujer" (Bad Woman)		Peru. Soap Opera.
1991	"Volver a Ti" (Back to you)		Venezuela. TV Movie.
1992	"La Mujer Doble" (The Double Woman)	Carmita Figueroa	Colombia. Soap Opera.
1992–1993	* "Pasiones Secretas" (Secret Passions)	María Alejandra Fonseca	Caracol. Colombia. Soap Opera. This was the first Colombian Telenovela broadcast in the USA. During the filming of this telenovela, actress Ruddy Rodríguez and actor Danilo Santos had a romance in real life, their passion was translated into the screen.
1994–1995	"Amores de Fin de Siglo" (Loves of End of Century)	Lejana San Miguel	Coral Pictures De RCTV. Venezuela. Soap Opera.
1995–1996	"Flor de Oro" (Golden Flower)	Teresa Amaya	Coral Pictures De RCN. Colombia. Series.
1997	"Aguamarina" (Aquamarine)		Fonovideo production Miami, USA. Soap Opera.
2000	"Amantes de Luna Llena" (Full Moon Lovers)		Venevision. Venezuela. Soap Opera.
2001	"El Inútil" (The Good-For-Nothing)	Rubiela Salcedo	RCN Colombia.
	"Guayoyo Express"	Special Appearance	Venezuela
2004	"Natalia de 8 a 9" (Natalie from 8 to 9)		Venezuela. TV Movie.
2005	"Ser bonita no basta" (Being Pretty is not Enough)	Herself	Venezuela. She portrayed herself as a cosmetic businesswoman.
2006	"Maria Lionza"		Venezuela. TV Movie.
2006–2007	"La ex" (The Ex, or, The Former Wife)	Amanda Otero and Miranda	Colombia. She performed a double character: Amanda Otero and Miranda. Soap Opera.
	"Amas de casas desesperadas".	Eugenia de Koppel (Bree)	Colombia-Argentina
2007	"Mujeres Asesinas" (Killer Women)		Colombia
2007	"Tiempo Final" (Final Time)		Colombia
2007	"La novela del Cholito"	Special guest	Ecuador
2008	"Cómplices"	Soledad Espinoza	Bogota. Soap Opera.
2009–2010	"Salvador de Mujeres"	Josefina Álvarez	Bogota. Soap Opera.
2012–2013	"Amor de Carnaval"	Adela Vengoechea	Barranquilla.

== Filmography ==
Film
Year	Title	Role	Notes
1987	The Living Daylights	Girl (Ruddy Rodríguez)	
1988	"Contacto en Caracas" (Contact in Caracas)		Directed by Phillip Toledano. A French Production.
1991	"La Guerra Blanche" (Blanche War)		It was a France-Spain production.
1994	"Bésame Mucho" (Kiss me Forever)		Directed by Phillip Toledano. A Mexico-Venezuela-Colombia production.
1998	"Amaneció de Golpe" (Coup at daybreak)	Isbelia	Directed by Carlos Azpúrua. A Spain-Venezuela production.
2004	"Sin Amparo" (Without Amparo)	Amparo	Directed by Jaime Osorio. A Venezuela-Colombia-Spain production.
2005	"Francisco de Miranda"	Amanda Otero Rosas / Miranda	Directed by Diego Rísquez. There was much criticism for the movie.
2007	"La Ministra Inmoral" (The Immoral Minister)	Gilma Zuleta "The Minister"	Colombia
2009	"Venezzia"		Directed by Haik Gazarian – Venezuela.
2013	"La Casa del Fin de los Tiempos"	Dulce	Directed by Alejandro Hidalgo – Venezuela.

Awards and achievements
Preceded by Astrid Carolina Herrera	Miss World Venezuela; 1985	Succeeded by María Begoña Juaristi
