= Guillermo García (actor) =

Venezuelan actor

- Born: Guillermo Jesús García Alvarado; 18 November 1981 (age 44); Barquisimeto, Venezuela
- Occupation: Actor
- Years active: 2005–present
- Television: La mujer perfecta; Los hombres también lloran

Guillermo García, is a Venezuelan actor. He is best known for telenovelas La mujer perfecta and Los hombres también lloran, and in movies such as Blue and Not So Pink and La Casa del Fin de los Tiempos.

== Filmography ==
=== Films ===
Year	Title	Role	Notes
2005	Miranda		
2007	Valiun	Andrés	Short film
2011	El último cuerpo		
2012	Azul y no tan rosa	Diego	
2013	La Casa del Fin de los Tiempos	Priest	
2016	El soborno del cielo	Alfer	
2016	El Inca	Pasajero Taxi	
2019	Welcome to Acapulco	Enrique Vázquez	
2025	Rosario		

=== Television roles ===
Year	Title	Role	Notes
2007	Camaleona	Ignacio "Iñaqui" Lofiego Rivas	Recurring role
2010	La mujer perfecta	Daniel Sanabria	Co-lead role
2012	Mi ex me tiene ganas	Cornelio Mena	
2015	Los hombres también lloran	Javier Torres	Lead role
2021-2022	Mayans M.C.	Igancio/El Banquero	Recurring role
