= Siqueiros =

Siqueiros is a Galician surname. Notable people with the surname include:

- Alejandro Siqueiros (born 1982), Mexican freestyle swimmer
- David Alfaro Siqueiros (1896–1974), Mexican painter
