= Amar te duele =

Amarte Duele
- Theatrical release poster
- Directed by: Fernando Sariñana
- Written by: Carolina Rivera
- Produced by: Fernando Sariñana; Francisco Gonzalez Compean
- Starring: Luis Fernando Peña; Martha Higareda; Alfonso Herrera; Ximena Sariñana; Pedro Damian
- Production companies: Altavista Films; Videocine
- Distributed by: Videocine; 20th Century Fox; IFC Films; Icon Entertainment; Warner Bros.
- Release date: November 8, 2002 (Mexico limited)
- Running time: 104 min.
- Language: Spanish
- Budget: $5,000,000 US (est.)

Amar te duele (Spanish for: "Loving Hurts You", also interpreted as "Loving You Hurts”) is a 2002 Mexican romantic drama film written by Carolina Rivera and directed by Fernando Sariñana. In the film, Ulises falls in love with Renata, although both belong to different social circles. Their love is tested while the people around them defy it. The film offers various archetypes of urban and modern youth in Mexico within a story about sexual attraction and adolescent idealism.

The movie marked the film debuts of Martha Higareda and Alfonso Herrera; the film also starred Pedro Damián and Luis Fernando Peña. It was released in Argentina, Chile and United States, where it received positive reviews.

== Plot ==
The story begins in a suburb of Mexico City with Ulises, whose father sells clothes in the market. He is accustomed to living humbly as he belongs to a low socioeconomic class, and could be considered a "naco". Ulises' environment is one of drugs, crime and graffiti, his great passion. One day, Ulises and his friends decide to go play Qzar, a laser-gun game. In the game, Ulises encounters Francisco, an upper-class boy, who is Renata's boyfriend. The "nacos" and the upper-class kids begin to fight after Francisco insults them. The fight ends in shoves and blows that only hurt Francisco's pride.

Ulises' life takes an unexpected turn when he meets Renata, an upper-class girl, in the Santa Fe Mall. Renata is buying clothes with her friend and confidante "La Güera" and younger, alcoholic sister, Mariana; when she suddenly crosses seductive glances with Ulises through a shop window. Ulises feels strangely and deeply attracted to this girl and does not know why. Despite knowing the socioeconomic differences between them, he stalks Renata and her companions. Renata’s friend dares Renata to kiss Ulises. Ulises and Renata share a passionate kiss. After that, Ulises continues to stalk the girls in order to find out more about Renata.

Ulises encounters Francisco again while following Renata. Francisco realizes that Ulises has been following Renata and orders his bodyguards to catch him. They both recall their first encounter in Qzar, causing Francisco to assault Ulises. Renata tries to stop the fight but before she can, Ulises manages to get away and escape from the mall.

Ulises cannot stop thinking about Renata and seeks her out, knowing she always visits the mall. Ulises regains hope when he does, in fact, sees Renata again. This time, she is with her mother, so meeting her is more difficult. Ulises takes advantage of Renata’s mother’s carelessness to approach and talk to her. Renata gives her phone number to Ulises to arrange a future meeting.

A few days later, Ulises calls Renata at her house, a very large and elegant residence, telling her to turn on her radio. It is revealed that he had called a radio program and dedicated a song to her. He goes on to invite Renata on a date. Renata accepts, and "La Güera" becomes her accomplice, keeping the relationship a secret and providing an excuse for Renata's outings. The date takes place in the same place they met, Santa Fe. Multiple clandestine dates follow until they become an item. The uncomfortable imbalance between the social classes of Ulises and Renata unleashes disagreements between Mariana and her upper-class friends against Ulises' "naco" friends. Ulises and Renata are troubled by these events but decide to disregard them for the sake of continuing their relationship.

For a while, Ulises and Renata became inseparable, that they even skip school in order to spend more time together. Ulises gifts to Renata range from cute portraits of her face, handmade by Ulises by himself, to huge painted graffiti on walls made especially for her. Francisco finds out and takes revenge on Ulises out of jealousy; he sends his bodyguards to beat him up at Renata’s school, where Ulises had been leaving her after their dates. Renata cannot do anything to prevent the beating.

When Ulises shows his wounds to his mother, she advises to him to stop seeing Renata. The reaction of Ulises’ friends is more radical. They decide to go to Renata’s school to get revenge. They start beating up the rich kids in a massive and bloody confrontation. Many of the rich kids were injured, including "La Güera"'s boyfriend, who ends up in the hospital. This reaches the ears of Renata’s parents, who had forbidden her to see Ulises again. She tries to defend their relationship, but their parents do not understand her. Renata is completely isolated from the outside world, so when she finally manages to send a message to Ulises, just to say goodbye, because she has decided that is the best for both of them. Ulises thinks that she does not love him anymore, but what Renata really wants is to protect him. Ulises does not take Renata’s decision well and begins to mourn and lament. He is on the brink of madness. His friends try to comfort him, but their efforts are futile as the only thing that could bring calm to him is to be next to Renata again.

Ulises is determined to see Renata again, despite the opposition from her parents, he climbs over the roof of Renata’s house and goes to her room where their encounter culminates physically. After their meeting, they decide to get away together to Acapulco, where nothing and no one can prevent their love. Mariana overhears their plans and she calls Francisco to tell him.

Before leaving, Ulises goes home and leaves his parents most of the money he earned since he began working. The couple goes to the bus station and just when Ulises and Renata are about to leave, Francisco and Mariana appear to prevent them from escaping. Desperate to keep Renata, Francisco pulls a gun and threatens to kill Ulises if they do not stop. Ulises is not scared, so he challenges Francisco to do so, but unexpectedly Francisco, who is inexperienced in the use of arms, accidentally shoots Renata. A few moments later, Renata dies in the arms of Ulises, but not before telling him she loves him. Ulises goes into shock and refuses to accept her death, and the loss of the love of his life. The last scene shows Ulises mourning by the grave of Renata.

== Cast ==
- Luis Fernando Peña as Ulises
- Martha Higareda as Renata
- Ximena Sariñana as Mariana
- Andrea Damian as “La Güera”
- Alfonso Herrera as Francisco
- Daniela Torres as China
- Armando Hernández as Genaro
- Pedro Damián as Renata’s father
- Patricia Bernal as Esther, Renata’s mother
- Zaide Silvia Gutiérrez as Claudia, Ulises’ mother
- Eligio Meléndez as Martín, Ulises’ father
- José María de Tavira as Alejandro
- Pablo Velasco as Ulises’ brother
- Fernando Sariñana appears in the scene of the mall at the beginning of the movie, insulting the “nacos”.

== Production ==
Martha Higareda revealed it was difficult to do the nude scenes in this movie, because at the time she was still a virgin and she had never undressed in front of a man before. "I hadn't experienced anything like that in my personal life. I'd kissed, that sort of thing, but I'd never been with a man, I'd never had a moment like in the film where I took off my clothes," Higareda said.

=== Notes ===
The drawings made by the character Ulises were really made by Luis Fernando Peña, the protagonist of the film, except for the graffiti, which was made by professionals. When filming, the actors could not sleep at their own houses because they had to work for 24 hours.

The name of the movie is a wordplay in Spanish: "Amarte" and "Amar te". The first one is the accusative second person singular, while the second one is the infinitive verb and the second person reflexive pronoun. The first option can be understood as "It hurts to love you" and the second option as "Loving hurts you"; it implies the pain Renata and Ulises feel by loving each other (amarte duele) and the pain that loving someone else provokes (amar te duele), like in the scene where Ulises' mother is taking care of him after the beating at Renata's school, and she suffers with him.

== Awards ==
Amar te duele and its cast have been nominated many times for important awards. It was nominated for the Silver Ariel in the categories of Best Actor (Luis Fernando Peña), Best Original Score (Enrique Quezadas) and Best Supporting Actor (Armando Hernandez); and by the MTV Movie Awards for Favorite Actor (Luis Fernando Peña) and the Sexiest Scene (Martha Higareda).

The film has also won many awards the Audience Choice Award for Fernando Sariñana in the Chicago Latino Film Festival (2004); the MTV Movie Award for Favorite Actress (Martha Higareda), Favorite Movie, Favorite Song for a Movie (Natalia Lafourcade) and Favorite Villain (Alfonso Herrera) in the MTV Movie Awards Mexico; the Silver Goddess for Best Music (Enrique Quezadas), Best Newcomer (Martha Higareda) and Best Supporting Actor (Armando Hernández) in the Mexican Cinema Journalists; and at least the Best Actor award (Luis Fernando Peña) in the Mons International Festival of Love Films.

== Soundtrack ==
The famous soundtrack contains a blend of Latin pop and rock.

Curating the young teenage love was followed throughout intentional and meaningful songs. Expressing the speaking language of love, through the art of music. Positioning the soundtrack in scenes that created meaning through lyrics, instrumentals and memories.

Natalia Lafourcade, Zoé and Ximena Sariñana began their journeys in the Latin pop and rock industry through this film. Today, these artists reach 29.5 million monthly listeners combined on Spotify. Their music continues to be recognizable for their expression throughout the journey of teenage love in Amarte Duele.

CD 1

1. "Amarte duele" - Natalia Lafourcade
2. "Soñé" - Zoé
3. "Más" - Kinky
4. "Caliente" - Pulpo
5. "Sabor a chocolate" - Elefante
6. "La negra" - Diabolo
7. "Funeral Reggae" - Genitallica
8. "Guanabi" - Pulpo
9. "En el 2000" - Natalia Lafourcade
10. "Tú tienes un lugar" – Mario Domm
11. "Cuento" - Ximena Sariñana

=== CD 2 ===
1. "Malo" - Pulpo
2. "Te ofrecí" – Diabolo
3. "No quieres venir" - Volován
4. "Mañana no es hoy" - Ximena Sariñana
5. "Llevarte a Marte" - Natalia Lafourcade (with the special collaboration of León Larregui)
6. "Amarte duele" - Natalia Lafourcade
7. "Las huellas" - Ximena Sariñana
8. "The other side" – Fey (with the collaboration of DJ. Grego e-Latin club)
