= Jolette (singer) =

Mexican television personality and presenter (born 1984)

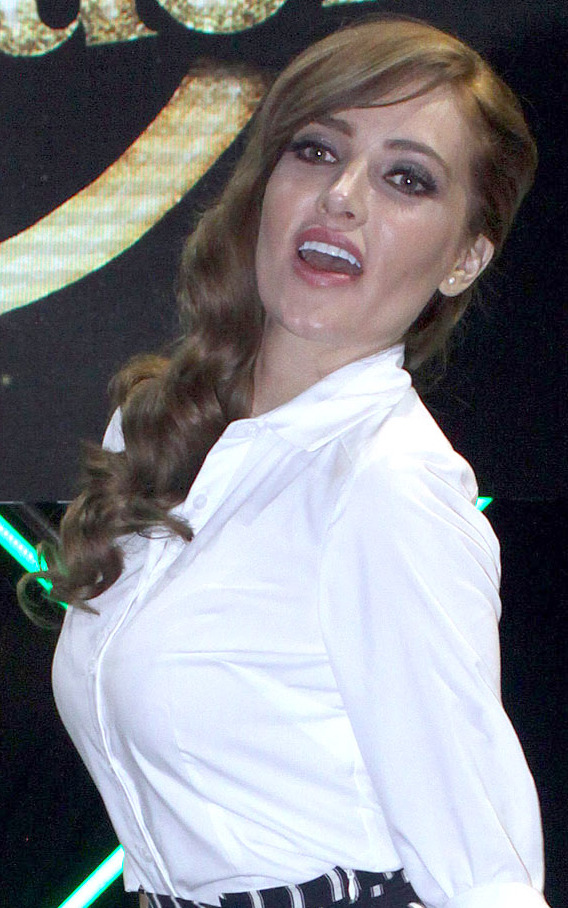
- Jolette in 2017
- Born: Jolette Guadalupe Hernández Navarrete; 21 January 1984 (age 42); Guadalajara, Jalisco, Mexico
- Occupations: Television personality; Television presenter
- Years active: 2005-2022

Jolette Guadalupe Hernández Navarrete (born 21 January 1984) is a Mexican television personality and presenter. She is best remembered for being part of the fourth generation from the reality musical talent show La Academia in 2005.

== Early life ==
Jolette Guadalupe Hernández Navarrete was born on January 21, 1984 in Guadalajara, Jalisco, Mexico, the daughter of Francisco Javier Hernández and Guadalupe Navarrete, and the sister of Javier and Pablo. She grew up in a conservative family attached to the Catholic religion, so she spent her childhood as a student of Orthodox religious schools. According to her parents, from childhood to adolescence, she showed a rebellious attitude towards people who asked her or did something that was not to her liking. This caused her problems while in high school, so she was frequently changed from the schools in which she studied, and also caused her mother to undergo several psychological tests in order to understand her behavior. The specialists she visited concluded that she suffered from Marilyn Monroe syndrome, childhood depression and lack of concentration. Jolette herself did not accept this diagnosis and took it as wrong, which is why she stopped attending psychologists. In addition to what was mentioned, she was constantly attacked by her classmates due to the physical beauty she possessed, coming to suffer from bullying for this. Her relationship with her parents was not the same, since she was very close to her mother, and her father was estranged by his seriousness and the little affection he showed her. Before coming to television with La Academia, she did professional university internships at a television channel in Guadalajara, took theater classes with actress Ofelia Cano, practiced figure skating and ballet, appeared on the cover of several magazines, and was photographed by some newspapers for the «social» sections.

== Career ==
=== La Academia (2005) ===
Jolette formed part of the 2005 generation from the musical reality show La Academia. Although she did not demonstrate any vocal talent in the beginning of the show, she got to stay for 17 weeks on the show. She is best remembered on the show for her multiple clashes with judges, professors and fellow contestants, which caused the rating of the program to go up.

=== Cuídate de la Cámara (2016–2022) ===
Since 2016, Jolette has formed part of the fashion criticism program Cuídate de la Cámara. It has been claimed that she has suffered of multiple attacks by her co-workers in the program.

=== Bailando por un sueño (2017) ===
In 2017 Jolette was selected to participate on the dancing reality show by Televisa Bailando por un sueño, where she was partnered with her "dreamer" Adrián Cavero. She was eliminated on the first program, and stated that she was only used by the production to generate more audience.

== Discography ==
- Mi Sueño En La Academia (2005)
