= La venganza del Charro Negro =

- Directed by: Marvick Nuñez
- Written by: David Hernández
- Based on: Characters by Ricardo Arnaiz
- Produced by: José C. García de Letona; Fernando de Fuentes Sainz
- Starring: Benny Emmanuel; Emilio Treviño; Erick Elías; Eduardo España; Annie Rojas; Mayté Cordeiro
- Edited by: Carlos Dayán Motta
- Music by: Manuel Borda
- Production company: Ánima
- Distributed by: Videocine
- Release date: October 22, 2026
- Running time: 94 minutes
- Country: Mexico
- Language: Spanish
- Budget: $1.14 million
- Box office: MX$269 million ($14.25 million)

La venganza del Charro Negro is an animated fantasy-horror film and the eighth and final installment to Ánima's Leyendas series, and the series' first film to be released theatrically since La leyenda del Charro Negro.

The film was released on October 22, 2026 to a major commercial success in Mexico, outperforming numerous records in the country's film and animation industry. It is both the country's highest-grossing, and highest-attended Mexican animated film of all time, and among its highest-grossing films.

== Plot ==
The film began with brothers Leo San Juan and Nando returning from Veracruz to work at their bakery home. Leo, containing a cursed mark on his hand, has experienced visions of villains of his past and was later arrested after kidnapping a child while mistaking the mother for La Llorona. After questioning, Leo was then taken to prison where the Charro Negro returned for revenge. Disguised as the Commander, he took Nando to the underworld after making a “deal”.

Leo and his reunited ghost friends, Xóchitl, Teodora, Alebrije, Evaristo, and Don Andrés. They then followed Gitana to the big house where they sent Leo’s spirit to the spiritual realm. Leo then witnessed the story of José and his brother Ramiro as they lived poor lives until, one day, they robbed a house for food, resulting the death of its elderly owner. José was betrayed by Ramiro and arrested. While imprisoned, he met the spirit of the Charro Negro, making a deal and he became possessed to be free and take vengeance on Ramiro. José became the Charro Negro’s possession. As Leo and his friends ran to the mirror, he jumped into the underworld to save Nando, leaving his friends and body behind. Teodora and Don Andrés swapped bodies and assisted Nando. Gitana and Leo’s body were taken by the guards to the hospital, shattering the mirror and trapping the ghost friends. In the underworld, Leo’s cursed mark was removed and given to Nando. They were then challenged by the Charro Negro to grab the coin first and go home. Leo and Nando faced a chicken monster, an aloe vera creature, and had a horse race. Meanwhile, after Evaristo fixed the mirror with his puppet show, the ghost friends head to the hospital as the doctors attempted to revive Leo’s body while Gitana tried to intervene. After completing the race, Leo was taken back to prison as Nando betrayed him. Xóchitl and the ghost friends helped revive Leo’s spirit where he was given the coin and key. Leo then went to the Charro Negro’s machine room where Nando was being possessed and Ramiro’s soul was being produced in a bottle as a drink. Just then, the spirit of Ramiro appeared to reveal to the Charro, possessing José, that during the home invasion, Ramiro was actually killed in a gunfire by the homeowner. The Charro spirit possessed Ramiro’s body and staged a betrayal against José. The same spirit then took over José for revenge. The Charro Negro-possessed José became distraught, and, despite continuing his machine, fought back. Leo and Nando escaped as the house exploded, killing José.

The Charro Negro’s spirit took over Nando’s body as his successor and had a stand-off with Leo, Teodora, and Don Andrés to get the whipping rope. Leo was hit in the chest by the Nando’s Charro snipe. But Leo fought back and Nando distracted the Charro Negro’s spirit as he became tangled by Leo’s rope. Leo removed Nando’s mark and retained it, freeing his body of the Charro Negro who then dissipated from the completed sunset. As souls were freed, and Teodora and Don Andrés went back home, Leo became dissipated and Nando was sent back to the bakery home, ending the film with him distraught. In the post-credits scene, the ghost of Leo and Nando’s mother, Aurora, was seen leaving her grave, crying for her children.

== Voices ==
- Benny Emmanuel as Leo San Juan
- Erick Elías as Charro Negro
- Emilio Treviño as Nando San Juan
- Eduardo España as Evaristo
- Mayté Cordeiro as Teodora
- Annie Rojas as Xóchitl
- José Luís Orozco as Alebrije
- Karen Vallejo as Gitana
- Jorge Rafael as Nacho
- Manuel Campuzano as Ramiro
- Humberto Solórzano as Resendo
- Alejandra de la Rosa as Nahuala
- Alejandro Villeli as Brujo
- Sofía Huerta as Doctora
- Marcela Guzmán as Llorona
- Paola Ramones as Moribunda
- Jesus Guzmán as Finando

== Development ==
The film was directed by Marvick Nuñez after working on Chaneques and La liga de los 5. Additional animation took place at Top Draw Animation and Bombillo Amarillo. Production services took place at Condor Studios.

It was developed during the time of Ánima's hostile environment and continuing controversy. After it announced its temporary shut down for animation production, the film's production was outsourced to external partners and financiers.

During an interview, creator Ricardo Arnaiz has reflected on the series' evolution since La leyenda de la Nahuala, saying he did not anticipate a sequel or a franchise. He also noted that it was Mexico's first film to focus on culture and traditions.

== Release ==
The film was released in Mexico on October 22, 2026 by Videocine.

It later received a limited theatrical release in the United States on November 6, 2026, distributed by Outsider Pictures.

=== Box office ===
The film performed commercially well at the Mexican box office, grossing MX$93.65 million pesos (est. $5.02 million USD) on its opening weekend with an audience count of 1.45 million. It outperformed Hollywood releases such as Clayface and Wildwood. It became the second-best opening for a Mexican film in its domestic release, following Instructions Not Included, and its best for an animated film. On its second weekend, the film continued to perform commercially well, grossing an additional MX$52.63 million pesos ($2.8 million USD) and an additional 0.76 million attendees. On its third weekend, the film dropped to #2 behind Godzilla Minus Zero, earning MX$34.25 million.

The film's total current accumulated gross is currently MX$269 million ($14.25 million USD) pesos with 4.3 million attendees, making it the highest-grossing and most-attended animated film produced in Mexico, to date, overtaking the records of 2015's Un gallo con muchos huevos. The success of the film has made the Leyendas series Mexico's highest-grossing film franchise of all time, and the highest-grossing film for its studio Ánima.

== Future ==
Creator Ricardo Arnaiz has discussed the possibility of more entries "for another 20 years", explaining potential for more storytelling of Mexican traditions and for the characters.
