= Leoncio Lara =

Mexican film composer (born 1965)

- Born: Ricardo Jacob; 9 August 1965 (age 60)
- Origin: Chihuahua, Chihuahua, Mexico
- Genres: Film scores
- Occupation: Composer
- Instruments: Piano, Guitar
- Years active: 1992–present
- Labels: Bon y los Enemigos del Silencio

Leoncio Lara Álvarez (known professionally as Leoncio "Bon" Lara; born 9 August 1965) is a Mexican film composer.

His notable works include Top Cat: The Movie, Rudo y Cursi, and the Leyendas animated franchise. He was a member and principal songwriter of his former band, Bon y los Enemigos del Silencio.

== Early life ==
Leoncio Lara was raised and born in Chihuahua, Chihuahua, Mexico.

== Career ==
Lara began his film career in 1992 with the film Marea Suave.

== Filmography ==
=== Television ===
Year	Title	Notes
2005	Al filo de la ley	Spanish telenovela
2017–2019 (Legend Quest) 2017-present	Legend Quest	Netflix original series based on the Leyendas film trilogy.
2017–2019 (Legend Quest) 2017-present	Noctámbulos, historia de una noche	Documentary series
2018–	Maestros Olvidados, oficios que sobreviven	Documentary series

=== 1990s ===
Year	Title	Director	Studio(s)	Notes
1992	Marea Suave	Juan Manuel González	Domain Entertainment / Marea Suave, S.A.	—N/a
1994	Chiapas: Historia Inconclusa	Cristian Calonico	Centro Cultural San Angel / Producciones Marca Diablo	Documentary film
1998	Wash and Wear	Sergio Guerrero	Manifiesto Films / IMCINE	Short film

=== 2000s ===
Year	Title	Director	Studio(s)	Notes
2000	Such is Life (Así es la vida)	Arturo Ripstein	Wanda Visión S.A.	—N/a
2000	The Ruination of Men (La perdición de los hombres)	Arturo Ripstein	Wanda Visión S.A. / Vanguard Cinema / Canal+ España	—N/a
2002	The Virgin of Lust (La virgen de la lujuria)	Arturo Ripstein	Laurenfilm / Producciones Amaranta	—N/a
2002	Alas rotas	Carlos Gil	Planeta 2010	—N/a
2003	At That Point... Rebecca (Rebeca a esas alturas)	Luciana Jauffred Gorostiza	IMCINE	Short film
2003	Brusco despertar	Ernesto Godoy	IMCINE / Conaculta	Short film
2004	Las Lloronas	Lorena Villarreal	Leyenda Films	—N/a
2005	La quietud y el fuego	Marcel Sisniega	Astrolabio / Zorry Films	—N/a
2005	El baile de la iguana	Marcel Sisniega	Astrolabio / Zorry Films	—N/a
2005	Club Eutanasia	Agustín Tapia	IMCINE / DistriMax	—N/a
2005	Los héroes y el tiempo	Arturo Ripstein	IMCINE	Documentary film
2006	Welcome Back to the Barrio	Jaime Mariscal	Mindlight Films / Orta-Mex Films / Laguana Productions	—N/a
2007	Luces artificiales	Marcel Sisniega	Astrolabio	—N/a
2007	El guapo	Marcel Sisniega	Andromeda Films / Astrolabio	—N/a
2008	Morenita, el escándalo	Alan Jonsson	New World Distribution / Fidecine / DistriMax	—N/a
2008	Rudo y Cursi	Carlos Cuarón	Esperanto Filmoj	—N/a
2009	Invasión	Alberto Mar	Blue Boy Animation	Animated short film

=== 2010s ===
Year	Title	Director	Studio(s)	Notes
2010	AAA – Sin Límite en el Tiempo (AAA: The Movie)	Alberto Rodríguez	Ánima Estudios / PAP	—N/a
2011	Así es la suerte	Juan Carlos de Llaca	Lionsgate / Videocine	—N/a
2011	Top Cat: The Movie	Alberto Mar	Ánima Estudios / Illusion Studios	—N/a
2011	La Leyenda de la Llorona (The Legend of the Llorona)	Alberto Rodríguez	Ánima Estudios	—N/a
2012	Palabras mágicas	Mercedes Moncada Rodríguez	IMCINE	Documentary film
2012	Las sufragistas	Ana Cruz Navarro	IMCINE	Documentary film
2012	Las paredes hablan	Antonio Zavala Kugler	Studio Fierberg / IMCINE / Canibal Networks	—N/a
2014	El trompetista	Raúl Robin Alejandro Morales Reyes	Glat Entertainment	Animated short film
2014	La leyenda de las Momias (The Legend of the Mummies)	Alberto Rodríguez	Ánima Estudios	—N/a
2015	Guardians of Oz	Alberto Mar	Discreet Arts Productions / Ánima Estudios	Also known as Wicked Flying Monkeys in some territories.
2015	Top Cat Begins	Andrés Couturier	Ánima Estudios / Discreet Arts Productions	—N/a
2016	El Americano: The Movie	Ricardo Arnaiz and Mike Kunkel	Animex / Phil Roman Entertainment / Olmos Productions	First animated work outside Ánima Estudios; also known simply as Americano.
2016	La Leyenda del Chupacabras (The Legend of Chupacabras)	Alberto Rodríguez	Ánima Estudios	—N/a
2017	No sucumbió la eternidad	Daniela Rea Gómez	Artegios / Foprocine	Documentary film
2017	Humboldt en México – La mirada del explorador	Ana Cruz Navarro	Arte y Cultura en Movimiento	Documentary film
2018	La Leyenda del Charro Negro	Alberto Rodríguez	Ánima Estudios	—N/a
2018	Silencio	Lorena Villarreal	Barraca Producciones	—N/a

=== 2020s ===
Year	Title	Director	Studio(s)	Notes
2022	Las leyendas: el origen	Ricardo Arnaiz	Ánima	ViX+ original film
2023	La leyenda de los Chaneques	Marvick Núñez	Ánima	ViX+ original film

=== TBA ===
Title	Director	Studio(s)	Notes
Rebeca	Juan Carlos Reyes	Ánima Estudios	Short Animation
