= El Privilegio de Mandar =

Mexican political parody TV show

- Starring: Alfonso Villalpando; Raquel Pankowsky; Moises Suarez; Eduardo España; Germán Ortega; Arath de la Torre; Carlos Espejel; Yekaterina Kiev; Angélica Vale
- Country of origin: Mexico
- No. of seasons: 2
- No. of episodes: 79

Production
- Executive producer: Carla Estrada
- Running time: c. 25 minuets (per episode)

Original release
- Network: Canal de las Estrellas
- Release: October 25, 2004 – July 9, 2006

El Privilegio de Mandar (The Privilege to Rule, literally "The Privilege of Commanding") is a Mexican political parody broadcast by Televisa on Canal de las Estrellas. It started as a sketch on another Televisa show, called La Parodia, that parodies political, social and cultural events happening in Mexico. High ratings kept the show running.

It was first broadcast on October 25, 2004, during La Parodia. Soon, the high success of the program encouraged the producers to separate it from the other show, so on January 3, 2005, it became an independent show.

The show's title and theme song were inspired by the successful soap opera El Privilegio de Amar.

Televisa broadcast what is considered the last episode of the series on July 9, 2006, just after the federal elections in Mexico. However, some of the actors who performed leading roles (such as Arath de la Torre, who played the role of presidential candidate of the Institutional Revolutionary Party (PRI), Roberto Madrazo) stated that in a few years, when political events have advanced, they will make a return to see how things are.

== History ==
In September 2004, La Parodia was one of the most successful shows on Mexican television. Characters presented here first would later appear on El Privilegio de Mandar, like "Chente" and "Andrés Manuel". The idea of the name "Privilegio" emerged from a skit on the famous Mexican telenovela El Privilegio de Amar (The privilege of loving), so the main title was presented with golden letters and slide images, just like a telenovela. This show was first aired as a section on La Parodia, on Monday October 25, 2004, at 10pm with its first episode, "El Informe". This quickly became such a success that from January 3, 2005, it became a show in its own right, La Parodia now being broadcast on Sundays. In September of the same year, Alter Films released a DVD containing the first ten broadcast episodes of El Privilegio de Mandar.

The show followed closely the world of the Mexican and even foreign politics, from the 2004 videoscandals and the Desafuero judges to the last 2006 Mexican general elections. During its broadcast, the show had several guest artists, like Consuelo Duval (from La Hora Pico and La Familia P.Luche). It won the 2005 TVyNovelas Award for Best Comic Program.

The show made history as the first political parody ever aired in Mexico, where every single political person was parodied. On Saturday July 8, Televisa broadcast a special programme hosted by Mexican entertainer and actor Ernesto Laguardia, in which scenes were presented from the first episodes of the show, interviews with the actors and the people parodied, as well as "behind the scenes" specials.

Televisa broadcast the last episode of what is considered the first season on July 9, 2006, just after the federal elections in Mexico.

From 2004, there have appeared around 50 different characters. The January 7, 2011 edition of NuestroDetroit.com, however, reported that a second season may soon be in production with Reynaldo Lopez taking over executive producing duties. The report went on to say that at least four actors—de la Torre, the Ortega brothers, and Vale—will return to the series.

== Synopsis ==
As a parody, it is kind of predictable knowing what will happen the next episode. The only thing the viewer has to do is follow the political news. For example, in 2004, Andrés Manuel López Obrador had problems with the law, confronting a desafuero judge, so in the show all the trouble was parodied for months.

Not all the shows are directly related to real politics, although there is usually some political context. In February 2006, Bailando Por Un Sueño (Dancing for a Dream) was highest rating show on Televisa, El Privilegio de Mandar parodied the show as Bailando Por Un Hueso (Dancing for a Bone) a double meaning because Hueso in this context is an expression for an influence, the participants were the politicians dancing, with the idea that the winner would get some political position or influence as a result.

On El Privilegio de Mandar, Mexico is parodied as "Colonia el Relaxo con x" ("Relaxo" means "mess" in Spanish. The real word is "relajo", but the "j" is changed to "x" like the one in "Mexico"), representing the bad organization of the political world in that country. The states are represented as "Manzanas" (blocks), and the president as the president of the neighbors' association. Many of the parodied names and places are word-plays in Spanish, so they wouldn't be understood by many English or other languages speakers.

== Main actors ==
These actors were the ones who played all the roles in El Privilegio de Mandar (the number next to them indicate the number of characters each one played)

- Alfonso Villalpando
- Angélica Vale
- Arath de la Torre
- Carlos Espejel
- Eduardo España
- Freddy Ortega
- Germán Ortega
- Herson Andrade
- Pierre Angelo
- Raquel Pankowsky
- Samia
- Yekaterina Kiev

Guest artists

- Consuelo Duval
- Jorge Arvizu, "El Tata"
- René Franco
- Ricardo Hill

== Characters ==
=== Main characters ===
- Andrés Manuel (Germán Ortega) — also known as El Peje — he is the parody of Party of the Democratic Revolution's former candidate to the presidency, Andrés Manuel López Obrador. The logo of the party is parodied as El Sol Azteca referring to the sun in the yellow background and the prehispanic Aztec culture
- Campa (Freddy Ortega) Ref. to Roberto Campa. He is the candidate to the presidency for the Partido Nueva Alianza
- Canti (Carlos Espejel). Sometimes referred to as "Carlinflas", he is an inhabitant of Colonia el Relaxo. He represents the people from Mexico, formerly known as El Pueblo. His character is also the parody of a world-famous Mexican comedian: Mario Moreno Cantinflas. Espejel played this character from 1982 to 1992, stopping because of the death of Cantinflas. He was offered to play it again in 2004, and after a while he accepted.
- Chente (Alfonso Villalpando) Chente is a short form for "Vicente" in Mexico (Vicente Fox Quesada, former President of Mexico). He is the president of the Colonia el Relaxo.
- Cuauhtémoc (Arath de la Torre) Is the first name of C. Cardenas, former candidate of the PRD for the presidency of Mexico (1988, 1994, 2000) and son of Lázaro Cárdenas del Río, president of Mexico from 1934 to 1940. At first he resists the idea of Peje taking his place as candidate for the presidency but he gives him the chance.
- Felipe Calderón (Eduardo España) — also known simply as Felipe — he was the parody of the National Action Party's (PAN) candidate to the presidency of Mexico, Felipe Calderón Hinojosa, who is now President of Mexico. PAN party is referred to as los azules, parodying the blue color of the party's logo. Sometimes is also represented as a piece of bread, because "pan" in Spanish means "bread".
- Jackson Ref. to Enrique Jackson, a congresist from PRI, as his last name is Jackson his recurrent gag was often dancing a choreography of Michael Jackson while the bass of Billie Jean is heard.
- La Jirafa (Yekaterina Kiev) A tall servant girl referred to as The Giraffe because of her height, she is the foil for Canti. She represents also the Mexican people when talking with Canti. She is a parody of Sara Garcia's character in Ahi esta el detalle, she always tries to keep Canti away from home as long as he only goes there to take dinner.
- Martita (Raquel Pankowsky) — also known as Martita Según — represents Former Mexican President Fox's wife, Martha Sahagún de Fox. She was a mandatory spouse that always tries to keep Chente on track and also sometimes she does her husband job.
- Roberto (Arath De La Torre) — also known as Madrazo — he is the parody of Roberto Madrazo, who was the Institutional Revolutionary Party's candidate to the presidency of Mexico, and that political party's former leader. The party is referred to as tricolor, because the colours of the Mexican flag (green, white and red).
- Sodi (Freddy Ortega). It's the parody of Demetrio Sodi de la Tijera, PAN's former candidate for the head of government in the Federal District.
- Vocero (Jorge Arvizu, El Tata). He represents the spokesman of the former president, Vicente Fox. He currently tries to fix any error of his boss by appearing suddenly and saying "Lo que Chente quiso decir" (...actually Chente is telling...) and said a thing different than the original thing Fox said.

=== Other characters ===
Some of these characters are also presented in "La Parodia" show

- Camacho Solís. Parody of Manuel Camacho Solís, former chief of government of the DF
- Carlos Abascal (Carlos Espejel), former Mexican Secretary of Labor, and Secretary of Government.
- Carlos Loharé de Mole (Arath de la Torre). Translated "Carlos I'lldoit of Mole), parody to journalist Carlos Loret de Mola (word play with Mola-Mole; popular Mexican dish)
- Dámela Micha (Consuelo Duval). Parody to journalist and newscaster Adela Micha, she is an original character from "La Parodia". Her name is a pun of "Give me the half".
- Elba Esther (Angélica Vale). Parody of Elba Esther Gordillo, leader of the National Union of Teachers.
- Jesús Ortega He lost PRD's candidadacy for Mexico City chief of government to Marcelo Ebrard. He later became consultant of Andrés Manuel
- Joaquín Loque-Nósdiga (Ricardo Hill). Translated "Joaquín Whatever-Hetellus", parody to newscaster Joaquín López-Dóriga)
- Manuel Espino Barrientos. He is consultant of Felipe Calderón, and is a parody of the PAN's leader Manuel Espino Barrientos
- Marcelo Ref. to Marcelo Ebrard. He is PRD's candidate to chief of government in the Federal District. Is also known as Supermar-celo (parody of Superman) by Andrés Manuel.
- Marcos (Carlos Espejel). A parody of the Zapatista guerilla leader, Subcomandante Marcos.
- Mariano Palacios (Pierre Angelo). He is Roberto's consultant, and a parody of Leader of the PRI, Mariano Palacios Alcocer
- Patricia Mercado (Samia). She was the candidate to the presidency of the Social Democratic and Farmer Alternative party.
- Peña Nieto Ref. to Enrique Peña Nieto. He is PRI's actual chief of government in La Manzana Estado de México, and parody of the then elected Governor of the State of Mexico and currently winner of 2012 presidential elections.
- Salinas (Germán Ortega) Ref. to Carlos Salinas de Gortari. He was president of Mexico in (1988–1994). He is also known as "El Innombrable" (The one that must not be named) by Andrés Manuel.
- Víctor Trujillo (René Franco), parody to comic and political journalist Víctor Trujillo

=== Previous characters ===
Some of these characters appeared on the last episode.

- Dolores Latierna – Parody of Dolores Padierna, wife of René Bejarano (see: videoscandals)
- Don Diego (Freddy Ortega) Ref. to Diego Fernandez de Cevallos, a Mexican senator and former PAN presidential candidate. During his sketches he tends to smoke severely and also in a scene involving the kid versions he was smoking hiding from his parents. Most of the sketches involving him were related to the build of the Carretera del Amor (Love's Highway, an extension he did to a road between two Jalisco towns).
- Dr Simi. Parody to Víctor González Torres, aliased Dr. Simi. Dr. Simi was originally only a character for a famous chain of generic drugstores in Mexico, called Farmacias Similares (Similar Pharmacies), but Víctor G. Torres (the owner of the chain) took the name of the character and tried to register as an alternative candidate to the presidency of Mexico. He is not member of any party. (Late 2005-early 2006)
- Edith González – Parody of actress Edith González. She has been also presented on "La Parodia"
- Ema Pulido. Parody to "Bailando por un sueño" critic.
- Félix Greco. Parody to "Bailando por un Sueño" critic (Only presented two episodes)
- Gober Precioso (Herson Andrade). Also known as Mario de Tin-Marín (referring to the word play to random choices (de tin marin de do pingüe), he is a parody to Mario Marín, Governor of Puebla. He is the chief of government of La Manzana Puebla. The surname "Gober Precisoso" came out as a result of a scandal in which a leaked cell phone conversation revealed a conversation with Kamel Nacif (a suspected child molester and owner of a textile empire) who referred to Mario Marin as his "Gober Precioso" (that is Precious Governor, since 'gober' is a contraction for Governor) and offered him two bottles of cognac, presumably as a bribe to abuse a journalist. The writers in the show used this fact for the basis of the character. (Early 2006)
- Irma (Angélica Vale) – Parody of actress Irma Serrano (Late 2004-Early 2005)
- Kamel Nacif (Pierre Angelo) – He is the owner of a textile empire, and friend of Mario Marín. (Early 2006)
- Mary (Angélica Vale). She was Canti's girlfriend and another inhabitant of Colonia el Relaxo (Late 2004-Mid-2005)
- Montiel (Freddy Ortega). He was PRI's candidate to chief of government for the State of Mexico. In real life, he is the former governor of that state. (Late 2004-Late 2005)
- Nico (Herson Andrade). Parody of Andrés Manuel's chauffeur, controversial in real life for his salary that contrasts with the fact that he drives a cheap car (Nissan Tsuru) for his boss. (Late 2004)
- La Novia de Don Diego (Samia). Parody of Don Diego's girlfriend (Late 2004-Early 2005)
- Ponce (Herson Andrade). Parody to PRD member Gustavo Ponce, (see: videoscandals)
- René Bejarano (Arath de la Torre). He was the parody of René Bejarano, Mexican PRD politician. (see: videoscandals) (Late 2004 - early 2005)
- Roberto Mitsuko. Parody to "Bailando por un sueño" critic.
- Rosario Robles (Angélica Vale). She was chief of government of Mexico City from 1997 to 2000
- Santiago (Pierre Angelo). Represents Santiago Creel, former Secretary of Government who lost the presidential candidadacy to Felipe Calderón in 2005. (Late 2004-Mid-2005)
- Yeidckol Ref. to Yeidckol Polensky. She was PRD's candidate for the chief of government in La Manzana Estado de México. She lost in 2005 to Enrique Peña Nieto (Mid-2005 –late 2005)

Characters also include non-Mexican politicians such as George Bush and Arnold Schwarzenegger.

== Final episode ==
Episode 79: "The elections". The last episode of what's considered the first season was aired at 10pm on Sunday July 9, 2006. A special TV programme was wired presenting early scenes from "El privilegio de mandar" in 2004, interviews with some parodied politics and with the actors, their feelings and "behind the scene" specials.

Real facts

- AMLO arrived early at 8am to vote on Sunday July 2
- A special cover was hosted by Televisa journalist on the day of the elections
- At night, Calderón and López Obrador celebrated their triumphs over the other, with people supporting them, without even knowing who had won
- On July 6, the official counting was finished and declared Felipe Calderón President-elect.
- Andrés Manuel battled against the results and call to a meeting at Mexico City's Zócalo
- Roberto Madrazo lost over 10 points under the nearest candidate

Parody
The show takes off with Andrés Manuel waiting for the IFE to open the polls at 7am on Sunday July 2, when the polls were actually opened at 8am (as a parody of the early arrive to the polls of the real Andrés Manuel). Then, are shown the Televisa studios where four journalists are waiting for the candidates to vote (they are also rarely presented characters):

- Carlos Loharé de Mole'
- Dámela Micha'
- Joaquín Loque-Nósdiga'
- Víctor Trujillo

Shortly after almost all characters arrive to the polls to present their votes (including characters that weren't presented anymore, like "Bejarano"). After the elections, "Ugalde" (parody to IFE's president) made an announcement on TV, saying that he couldn't give an official winner because two candidates (Felipe and Andrés Manuel) were head to head so it wasn't time to celebrate yet. The scene changes and shows Felipe celebrating with balloons and all the people supporting him:

- - (Crowd, cheering) Felipe!, Felipe!, Felipe!
- - (Felipe, happy) Friends, that disobedient boy (Disobedient boy is a mariachi song sung by Vicente Fox in a TV show during his campaign) said it!, I'm the next president!. And I'm sorry for Andrés Manuel that must be very sad

The scene changes again, now to Andrés Manuel:

- - (Crowd, cheering) Andrés Manuel!, Andrés Manuel!, Andrés Manuel!
- - (Andrés Manuel, happy) I am president!. I won for over five hundred thousand votes!

However, the scene changes once more, now to Roberto, in his house sat down and paralysed in front of the TV. Soon the door rings:

- - (Roberto, sitting next to Mariano Palacios) The doorbell rings Mariano. Open the door; it could be a vote.

The day now changes to Thursday July 6, when the official counting was finished and declared Felipe winner of the election. However, Andrés Manuel is very angry, and calls to a demonstration:

- - (Andrés Manuel, angry) We have to do a meeting at Saturday 8 at the Zócalo for battling against the polls! (Talking to Jesús Ortega)
- - (Jesús Ortega) Why not Sunday 9 morning?
- - (Andrés Manuel) No Jesús, is the final match of the World Cup!
- - (Jesús Ortega) And why not Sunday 9 night?
- - (Andrés Manuel) No, it's the final episode of "El Privilegio de Mandar"

Finally, the scene of the meeting of Andrés Manuel is presented. When he finishes talking, Canti goes up the platform and starts talking about Andres Manuel's decision and the respect of the democracy. The show ends with all the crowd cheering "México!, México!, México!", a screen showing "¿Fin?" (The End?) and all the actors thanking the viewers for their support.

Jokes on this episode

- Joaquín Loque-Nósidga, talking about the great coverage of Televisa of the elections by their reporters:
  - -(Joaquín) We've got a reporter and a camera on every state, on every district, on every poll, on every crayon.
- Roberto has voted and now goes up to Mariano Palacios (his consultant):
  - - (Mariano, proud) Hey Roberto! You know what?, I voted against Felipe! (Roberto's rival)
  - - (Roberto, curious) And how did you vote against Felipe, Mariano?
  - - (Mariano, proud) I marked him with a cross! (Note: mark the candidate space with a cross means a vote)
- Mario de Tin Marín hadn't respected the line and he was voting. The crowd protests about that selfish act:
  - - (Mario de Tin Marín, smiling) Calm down, as if you were gods!

== Troubles with politicians ==
Andrés M. López Obrador criticised the show as making fun of him personally and as a strategy of the media to attack him because he felt that the amount of time dedicated to him was excessive in relation to other politicians. However, the show continued to broadcast parodies of him. Víctor González Torres also criticized the show as making fun of his way of talking, as he has physical problems.

After 2006 elections, changes to the laws were provided to warn any television propaganda in favor or against a candidate, preventing Televisa to do another season of El Privilegio de Mandar.

== Common phrases and jokes ==
=== Chente ===
- "No Marthita" (complaining about what his wife says)
- He often wears boots, as the real person
- Several one-liners used in his campaign and presidential cycle were used to ridicule the President's actions.
- Everytime the president says something aggressive to others, Vocero appears from nothing telling "What Chente really means is...")

=== Felipe Calderón ===
- He is referred to sometimes as "Jelipe", as a common bad pronunciation of the letter F.
- He waves his left arm up and down, as the real person. When doing this there was a funny cartoon sound effect.
- Jokes with the real political campaign "Manos limpias" (clean hands):
  - "Since I have to keep my hands clean, a few days ago, I couldn't play Play-Doh with my daughter!
  - "Since I have to keep my hands clean, the other day, my wife had to replace our SUV's wheel!
  - "Since I have to keep my hands clean, the other day, I ate a taco with a spoon!

=== Andrés Manuel ===
- The mispronunciation of the letters C and S, commonly between people from the Mexican Southeast
- Parody of the pauses the real person makes while he is speaking
- He always has his hair bad bruised so he had some hairs on the backhead lift up. He mentioned this portion of hair as his "Gallito Feliz" and sing a children song about it (Gallo in Mexico is a portion of hair bad bruised... literally translated to "Happy Rooster"). This gag is joking at the point that the real person woke up early the press to give a daily conference press as Mayor of Mexico City, and sometimes he arrived without bruising his hair properly.
- Fear from Carlos Salinas de Gortari, he always mentions him as "El Innombrable" (The one must not be named) in a similar way to Harry Potter's Voldemort.In an episode he fights Darth Vader and when he is defeated he reveals to be "El Innombrable" and then Salinas said that Peje is his son.

Memorable phrases

  - "A estas encuestas sí les creo porque voy ganando" (These polls I believe in, because I'm winning); after the polls from June 23, when he was winning
  - "Que poca... ¡eso no es cierto!" (Son of a... that's not true!); used several times
  - "¡Esto es un compló!" (This is a complot!); every time he feels cornered about a situation that everybody is blaming on him even when he was the real cause. The phrase was original from Mexican Big Brother reality show where some participants plotted to nominate another participant. Indeed, when the real person said that he was plotted against in a political ruse to get him expelled from the elections, in the comedy the characters participated in a Big Brother-style reality show and he was the first to be nominated because he broke some of the rules in order to attend his morning conference, at the end he replies "This is a complot!".
  - "¡Callese, cha-cha-la-ca!" (Shut up you insignificant thing!); Chachalaca is a very small animal, and it was used frequently after the real one said this to the President during his campaign. In the program he used to shut up another characters.

=== Roberto ===
- Uses the phrase "Amigo" (my friend) anytime he talks to somebody
- He laughs in a very noisy way
- Reference for the strongness of his last name ("Madrazo" is often an offensive word in Spanish for "hit") sometimes making him to get hit by something.
- Incredible fear from Elba Esther Gordillo

=== René Bejarano ===
- He never laughs. Instead, he covers his mouth with his hand and shakes his head like he was laughing
- He uses his bills to blow his nose, clean his face, etc.
- He ends his phrases in an upper tone than the one he started them
- He always ensure to do not forget the rubbers.

Memorable phrases

  - "Dondequiera que esté, nadie, absolutamente nadie, me podrá quitar mi derecho de soñar" (No matter where I am, nobody, absolutely nobody will ever take from me my right to dream); at his desafuero judge.
  - "Me siento como un billete dentro de un portafolios" (I feel like a bill trapped inside a briefcase); being in jail.
  - "No hay que ceder" (we must not give in.)

== Home media ==
In 2005, 10 early episodes from September–November 2004 were released on a double-sided DVD format. This DVD edition is still available in some music stores in Mexico. These episodes include all the desafuero judge to Bejarano and the videoscandals.

=== Synopsis ===
Episode 6: "Derecho de soñar" (Right to dream); is about Bejarano's desafuero judge.
Two police officers ("polecias", as a parody of the ignorance of some police officers in Mexico) are waiting for Bejarano to come out of his house. The frame changes to the room of Bejarano, where he is packing his clothes. Later, in the desafuero judge, he starts avoiding the judge's questions: Part of the dialogue:

- (Bejarano): "I know, you all have seen the video of me receiving money from Ahumada. The thing that really disappoints me is that, since an original version exists, you've all seen a fake copy. Now, our partner Dolores (referring to his wife) will give you the original videos that you can buy for a low price"
- (Judge): "And the cash René?" (In Spanish: ¿Y la lana René?) (lana is a form to say money or cash in Mexico)
- (Bejarano): "La Rana René está con los Muppets" (Kermit the Frog is with the Muppets) (Joking of the pronunciation of lana=rana; Rana René is the name of Kermit the Frog in Mexico)
- (Judge, after finishing the judgement): "What does the people say?" (¿Qué es lo que dice el público?)
- (Crowd, furious): "Out!" "Out!" (¡Fuera, fuera!) (this is parody of the TV Show Sabado Gigante)
- (Bejarano): "Finally, to wrap things up, no matter where I am, nobody, absolutely nobody will ever take from me my right to dream!"
- (Crowd): "Out"! "Out!"
- (The frame changes and Bejarano is trapped in jail, before he wakes up and realizes he was dreaming), after this, other characters also dream, specially Peje where he dreams he's fighting Carlos Salinas dressed as Star Wars characters; Salinas, dressed as Darth Vader, rips Peje's "gallito feliz" and then removes his mask to show his identity and revealing to be his father.

== See also ==
- List of satirical television news programs
