= Las leyendas: el origen =

- Directed by: Ricardo Arnaiz
- Written by: Angel Pulido
- Story by: Ricardo Arnaiz
- Based on: Characters by Ricardo Arnaiz
- Produced by: José C. García de Letona; Fernando De Fuentes
- Starring: Alex Casas; Priscila "Cajafresca"; Daniela Ibañez; Paola Ramones; Eduardo España; Bruno Bichir
- Edited by: Alberto Rodríguez
- Music by: Leoncio Lara Bon
- Production company: Ánima
- Distributed by: ViX
- Release date: 10 August 2022
- Running time: 85 minutes
- Country: Mexico
- Language: Spanish
- Budget: $800,000

Las leyendas: el origen (English: Legend Quest: The Origin) is a 2022 Mexican animated comedy horror film directed by Ricardo Arnaiz. It serves as a prequel to the Leyendas franchise taking place before La Leyenda de la Nahuala and is produced by Ánima. The film is an origin story focused on the little Calavera duo, Finado and Moribunda, who must leave their home in Pueblo Calaca while looking out for a human baby.

Las leyendas: el origen was released on the streaming platform ViX platform on 10 August 2022. The film was initially planned for a theatrical release in 2020 in Mexico, but was cancelled due to the COVID-19 pandemic.

== Premise ==
Two Calavera children must look after a human infant after crossing through an eternal mirror, absorbing energy of a portal that separates the worlds between life and death.

== Voice cast (Spanish) ==
- Bruno Bichir as Aniceto
- Emiliano Ugarte as Finado
- Paola Ramones as Moribunda
- Eduardo España as Evaristo
- Alex Casas as Chimo
- Cajafresca as Moira
- Daniela Ibañez as Eva
- Germán Fabregat as Deveriux
- Tommy Rojas as Pascual
- Eduardo Ramírez Pablo as Chuletl

== Development ==
Ricardo Arnaiz, the creator of the Leyendas characters, served as the director of the film, marking his return to the franchise since The Legend of La Nahuala and his first collaboration outside of Animex Producciones. The film was originally titled tentatively as The Legend of... and then The Legend of Finado and Moribunda. The film was first teased on social media.

== Release ==
It was originally slated for an April 2020 release, but was postponed due to the COVID-19 pandemic in the country.

The film was released on the ViX service on August 10, 2022.

== Sequel ==
The film is succeeded by La leyenda de los Chaneques, which was also released on Vix on 14 July 2023.
