= Benny Emmanuel =

Mexican actor

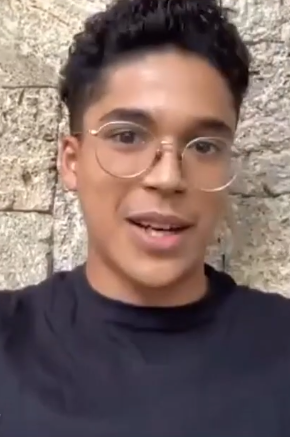
- Emmanuel in 2021
- Born: Benny Emmanuel Mendoza Yirene; 17 December 1996 (age 29); Amatitlán, Cosamaloapan, Veracruz, Mexico
- Occupation: Actor
- Years active: 2007-present

Benny Emmanuel Mendoza Yirene (born 17 December 1996) is a Mexican actor. He gained recognitionfor playing "Beto", in the series La CQ (2012–14). He joined the sitcom Como dice el dicho in 2015, playing Pato. In 2019 and 2021, he starred in the films Chicuarotes and Cosas Imposibles, which earned him nominations for Best Actor at the Ariel Awards. Since 2014, Emmanuel has voiced Leo San Juan in the animated film franchise Leyendas.

== Life and career ==
=== 1996 – 2006: Early life ===
Benny Emmanuel Mendoza Yirene was born on 17 December 1996 in the municipality of Amatitlán, Veracruz. He and his family moved to Mexico City when he was one year old. At the age of seven, he began to study acting at the Centro de Educación Artística (CEA) (Center for Artistic Education), owned by multimedia giant Televisa, where he met future friend and castmate Harold Azuara.

=== 2007– 2014: Early roles and La CQ ===
Emmanuel first appeared on television in 2007 as a guest on the popular Mexican sitcom La familia P. Luche, playing "Ladrón Flaco", and in the series Vecinos as "Toñito". He appeared in several films throughout 2009 and 2011, including Amar no es querer. From 2009 to 2015, he portrayed several characters in the Mexican program La rosa de Guadalupe.

Emmanuel gained mainstream recognition in Latin America after starring in the youth-oriented sitcom, La CQ. He portrayed "Roberto 'Beto' Bautista", the most intelligent student in the school, and one of the main characters. The show ran from August 2012 to March 2014, lasting 4 seasons. The cast members also recorded a full-length album under the same name, with Emmanuel receiving a solo song titled "Mil Formulas". Following its final season, production started on a theater musical version of the show, with dates spanning throughout the region that same year.

Emmanuel was cast in the leading role of Leo San Juan in the horror-comedy, animated film franchice Leyendas. His first portrayal of the character was in the film La leyenda de las Momias, being the third actor to voice the character.

== Filmography ==
=== Film ===
Year	Title	Role	Note(s)
2009	Sin nombre	Niño #1	
2009	2033	Gabriel	
2010	Revolución	Leonel	
2010	De la infancia	Francisco Niebla	
2010	Somos lo que hay	Adolescente 1	
2010	Marcelino Pan y Vino	Soldado Casasola	
2011	Días de gracia	El Toques	
2011	Amar no es querer	Julito	
2014	Las oscuras primaveras	Joven de las copias	
2014	El más buscado	Alfredo Joven	
2014	La leyenda de las Momias de Guanajuato	Leo San Juan (voice)	Animated film
2015	Trémulo	Carlos	Short film
2016	La leyenda del Chupacabras	Leo San Juan (voice)	Animated film
2017	Vuelven	Brayan	
2018	La leyenda del Charro Negro	Leo San Juan (voice)	Animated film
2018	Campeones	Marcelo	
2018	Detrás de la montaña	Miguel	
2019	Chicuarotes	Cagalera	
2021	Cosas imposibles	Miguel	
2021	Tocar el cielo	Miguel	Short film
2022	El Sueño de Ayer	Lázaro	
2023	Hail Mary	Jose	
2023	La leyenda de los Chaneques	Leo San Juan (voice)	Animated film ViX original film
2023	Los (casi) ídolos de Bahía Colorada	Romeo Abitia	Netflix original film
2026	La venganza del Charro Negro	Leo San Juan (voice)	Animated film
2026	Contra el huracán	Wirpul	Netflix original film
2026	Ceniza en la boca		
