= Leyendas (franchise) =

Animated horror-comedy film franchise created by Ricardo Arnaiz

Legend Quest / Leyendas
- Created by: Ricardo Arnaiz
- Original work: La leyenda de la Nahuala (2007)
- Owner: Ánima Estudios.
- Years: 2007–present

Films and television
- Films: The Legend of La Nahuala (2007); The Legend of La Llorona (2011); The Guanajuato Mummies (2014); The Chupacabra (2016); The Black Charro (2018); The Origin (2022); La leyenda de los Chaneques (2023); La venganza del Charro Negro (2026)
- Television series: Legend Quest (2017–2019)

Games
- Video game: Las Leyendas: El Pergamino Mágico

Legend Quest (known as Leyendas in Latin America) is an animated horror-comedy film franchise created by Ricardo Arnaiz and produced by Mexican animation studio Ánima Estudios. It is loosely based on The Reluctant Dragon by Kenneth Grahame. It consists of seven films, a digital television series, and a mobile game. It centers on Leo San Juan, a heroic preteen boy who can communicate with ghosts and monsters; Theodora, a sassy and quirky preteen ghost girl with a know-it-all personality; Sir Andrés, an amicable but loony old knight; Alebrije, a mild-mannered mythological creature; and Finney and Morybetta, two silent calavera children. Set in the early nineteenth century, each of the films is based upon a different Mexican legend.

The franchise began in 2007 with the release of The Legend of La Nahuala, directed by creator Ricardo Arnaiz and produced by Soco Aguilar and Ricardo Arnaiz, Nahuala Producciones Cinematograficas S.de R.L. de C.V., and Puebla-based Animex Producciones. The film was later followed by The Legend of La Llorona in 2011, which was instead produced by Ánima Estudios due to the box office failure of the film Nikté. The Legend of the Guanajuato Mummies in 2014, The Legend of the Chupacabra in 2016, The Legend of the Black Charro in 2018, Legend Quest: The Origin in 2022, La leyenda de los Chaneques in 2023 and La venganza del Charro Negro in 2026 The franchise has also been adapted into a Netflix original series, simply titled Legend Quest.

It is one of the few film franchises in Mexico, which is a rare instance within the country's domestic film industry. As such, the franchise has become widely popular within the country and often achieves successful box-office numbers, with La venganza del Charro Negro currently being the highest-grossing film.

== Films ==
=== The Legend of La Nahuala (2007) ===
The first film, The Legend of La Nahuala, was released on 1 November 2007 in Mexico with 350 copies, directed by Ricardo Arnaiz and produced by Soco Aguilar and Ricardo Arnaiz, Nahuala Producciones Cinematograficas S.de R.L. de C.V., and Animex Producciones. The film performed well at the Mexican box-office, grossing a total of $42.2 million pesos (US$4.03 million), which was one of the highest-grossing Mexican films at the time. Based on the Nagual legend mythology and receiving the support of the state of Puebla, the film was written by Omar Mustre and Antonio Garci, and featured the voices of famous Mexican actors, including Andrés Bustamante, Jesús Ochoa, Rafael Inclán, Martha Higareda, Manuel 'Loco' Valdés, and Pierre Angelo. Set in 1807 in the city of Puebla de Los Angeles, the film centers on Leo San Juan, a cowardly 9-year-old boy. He summons the courage to rescue his older brother, Nando, from an abandoned house possessed by an evil witch known as the 'Nahuala', with the aid of his new ghost friends. The success of the film launched a franchise, the license to which Arnaiz gave to Ánima Estudios.

=== The Legend of La Llorona (2011) ===
A sequel, The Legend of La Llorona, based on the La Llorona ("The Weeping Woman") legend, was released on 21 October 2011 with 225 to 300 copies. Unlike its predecessor, it was produced by Ánima Estudios and directed and co-written by Alberto Rodríguez, who, along with the studio, took over the production of further films. The film also uses flash animation, as well as its successors (excluding Chupacabra; see below). The film was written by Ricardo Arnaiz, the predecessor's director, Jesús Guzmán, and Omar Mustre, who also wrote the preceding film. Some of the previous film's voice cast reprised their roles, while some actors, such as Andrés Bustamante, were replaced by new voice actors. The film picks up where Nahuala ended and follows the new adventures of Leo San Juan and his gang, Don Andrés, Alebrije, Teodora, Finado and Moribunda. Taking place in ancient Xochimilco, Leo falls out of the crew's ship and meets a young village girl, named Kika, who is on her journey to find her lost brother, Beto. Leo and Kika encounter the 'Llorona', while the rest of his gang end up in the La Isla de las Muñecas ('The island of the dolls'). The film did not receive support from any Mexican state. It was another box-office success, earning $8 million pesos on its opening weekend, and grossing a total of $55.4 million pesos (US$2.9 million), performing better than its predecessor.

=== The Legend of the Guanajuato Mummies (2014) ===
The third film, The Legend of the Guanajuato Mummies, or simply The Legend of the Mummies, was released on 30 October 2014 with 700 copies in regular and 4DX formats, a first for a Mexican film. The film is a fictionalization of the origin of the mummies, notably from the Guanajuato region. It follows Leo San Juan and his gang in the city of Guanajuato, trying to find Xóchitl, who was kidnapped by Rosseau, an old wizard with the ability to awaken mummies from the dead. Along the way, Leo teams up with Valentina, disguised as her alter-ego Luis, who is on her own journey to find her father. Director Alberto Rodríguez returns to direct for the second time, and makes his writing debut, along with a screenplay by Jesús Guzmán, Ricardo Arnaiz, and Dulce María Guerrero. Mummies was not produced with the support of the Mexican federal government, due to disapproval; however, it did receive support from the state government of Guanajuato. Despite the lack of national support, Mummies was a major box-office success, and the first film in the series to surpass $50 million pesos; grossing a total of $92.25 million pesos (US$4.9 million). As the voice cast from Llorona reunited for the third film, among the newcomers was Benny Emmanuel, known for La CQ. He provided the voice of Leo San Juan, and has remained the character's voice actor since Mummies. Eduardo "Lalo" España, a Mexican actor and comedian, joined the cast as a new character, Evaristo, an alebrije with a smooth personality, while Alejandra Müller, a teen actress who is also an alumnus of La CQ, voiced Valentina, a girl who Leo helps find Rosseau.

=== The Legend of Chupacabras (2016) ===
The Legend of Chupacabras, the fourth film, was released on 21 October 2016. The story is based on the chupacabra creature. In the film, while on his way home to Puebla, Leo and his fellow rebel mates get caught up in a civil war, and they get locked up in Peñamiller. When the 'chupacabra' attacks the prison, Leo calls for the help of his friend, Teodora, to discover the origin of the creature as he escapes with his inmates. The films' past characters, including Don Andrés and Xochitl, were left absent, while Fernando "Nando" San Juan, Leo's older brother from Nahuala, makes a return to the franchise. The film also uses traditional animation, which is the first time since Nahuala and the first during the Ánima Estudios era. In another series first, the film was released in the United States on 14 October 2016, one week prior to its release in Mexico. Distributed by Pantelion Films, a major American film distributor for Latin American-themed films, the film was shown in the original Spanish-language format with English subtitles. Despite receiving negative reviews, the film is another major box-office success, grossing a total of $100.7 million pesos (US$5.4 million), and is the series' first to surpass the $100 million peso-mark as well as the second-highest-grossing film within. While the Mummies voice cast return for the fourth film, Rafael Inclán did not return to voice Alebrije, as he was replaced by dubbing actor Herman López. Ricardo Arnaiz, creator of the franchise, was not involved in the production of this film.

=== The Legend of the Black Charro (2018) ===
The Legend of the Black Charro, the fifth entry, was released on 19 January 2018, as opposed to previous films which were normally released in October. It picks up from Chupacabras where Leo San Juan and his brother Nando head home to Puebla. Along the way, Leo encounters the 'Black Charro' who mistakes him and causes a girl to be cast into the underworld. He enlists the help of his friends to correct his mistakes and take on the 'Black Charro' once and for all. Black Charro marks the return of some of the past films' characters, such as Don Andrés and Xochitl, while also featuring cameos of other returning characters and references from the entire franchise. Along with the returning voice cast of the Mummies and Chupacabra, Mexican actor Erick Elías voices the 'Black Charro'. It proved to be another commercial success, earning a total of $100.8 million pesos; the highest-grossing Legend Quest film to date.

=== Legend Quest: The Origin (2022) ===
A spin-off prequel film, titled Legend Quest: The Origin, focuses on the Calavera duo, Finado and Moribunda, who must look after a human baby when he crosses the Espejo Eternal ("eternal mirror") through a portal that separates the Realm of the Living and the Dead. The film, first teased on Twitter, was originally scheduled for a 2020 theatrical release, but was delayed due to the COVID-19 pandemic.

=== La leyenda de los Chaneques (2023) ===
Set five years after the events of Charro Negro, Chaneques follows Leo San Juan and Nando going to Veracruz, where an ancient curse has struck. When separated, Leo must endure a dangerous journey without his ghost friends, and take on the Chaneques.

=== La Venganza del Charro Negro (2026) ===
With his powers restored, Leo San Juan and his friends go back to the underworld as the Charro Negro and Leo's past villains get revived. They must rescue his older brother Nando after he was taken and possessed, while the heroes learn about their self-meaning. For the first time since 2018's Charro Negro film, the series returned to a standard theatrical release, and proved to be a massive success at the Mexican box office, grossing $93.65 million pesos on its opening weekend. It was the highest opening for a Mexican animated film, to date, and the second best opening in the industry behind 2013's Instructions Not Included.

=== Franchise future ===
While Black Charro has been rumored to be the last film in the franchise, director Alberto Rodríguez has stated the possibility of a new film, due to the amount of potential and "many more doors to explore", but would require the creation of new characters. Andrés Couturier, the voice of Don Andrés and manager at Ánima Estudios, said that he wouldn't be "surprised to see crossovers or spin-offs of Las Leyendas." Rodríguez stated that Black Charro would be his last film, as he has expressed interest in making new projects outside of the franchise. "I feel that my cycle is already finished in terms of [Legend Quest]. I already want to do other things, but we are still involved in the development of other things that come for the Legend Quest," he said.

On the Day of the Innocents, a "prank" teaser for a "live action" installment was released on December 28, 2020, which was said to be released in 2022.

== Television series ==
A Netflix original series based on the characters, named Legend Quest (Las Leyendas), premiered in 2017 in 30 languages, making it the platform's first original animated series produced in Latin America.

The 2019 TV series Legend Quest: Masters of Myth is a Netflix original production with Ánima Studios. The series is direct continuation from Legend Quest, featuring characters from the Legends Mexican movie franchise and Legend Quest, the only difference being that both Leo and Teodora are teenagers in the show.

== Voice cast (Spanish) ==
Characters	Films						Television series	
Characters	The Legend of La Nahuala	The Legend of La Llorona	The Legend of the Guanajuato Mummies	The Legend of the Chupacabra	The Legend of the Black Charro	Las Leyendas El Origen	Legend Quest	Legend Quest: Masters of Myth
Characters	2007	2011	2014	2016	2018	2022	2017	2019
Leonardo "Leo" San Juan / El Charro Negro	Fabrizio Santini	Yair Prado	Benny Emmanuel	Benny Emmanuel	Benny Emmanuel	Liliana Barba (baby)	Benny Emmanuel	Benny Emmanuel
Leonardo "Leo" San Juan / El Charro Negro			Blas García	Humberto Solórzano	Erick Elías			
Teodora Villavicencio	Mayte Cordeiro	Mayte Cordeiro	Mayte Cordeiro	Mayte Cordeiro	Mayte Cordeiro	Mayte Cordeiro	Mayte Cordeiro	Mayte Cordeiro
Don Andrés Artasánchez	Andrés Bustamante	Andrés Couturier	Andrés Couturier	Picture only	Andrés Couturier		Andrés Couturier	Andrés Couturier
El Alebrije de la Biblioteca	Rafael Inclán	Rafael Inclán	Rafael Inclán	Herman López	Herman López		Ricardo O'Farrill	Ricardo O'Farrill
Xochitl Ahuactzin	Martha Higareda		Annie Rojas	Picture only	Annie Rojas	Annie Rojas		
Evaristo			Eduardo "Lalo" España	Eduardo "Lalo" España	Eduardo "Lalo" España	Eduardo "Lalo" España		
Fernando "Nando" San Juan	Bruno Coronel			Emilio Treviño	Emilio Treviño	Yerary Rodríguez (child)		
Finado	Silent role	Jesús Guzmán	Jesús Guzmán	Daniel del Roble	Bruno Coronel	Emiliano Ugarte	Silent role	
Moribunda	Silent role	Romina Marroquín Payró	Romina Marroquín Payró	Gaby Guzmán	Norma Iturbe	Paola Ramones	Silent role	
Nahuala Machorro / La Nahuala	Ofelia Medina	Opening cameo	Flashback	Opening cameo				
Fray Godofredo	Germán Robles	Miguel Couturier	Andrés Couturier				Alejandro Villeli	
Toñita San Juan	María Santander				Ángela Villanueva		Ángela Villanueva	
Santos Machorro	Jesús Ochoa Mauricio Roldán (young)				César Terranova			
Nana Dionisia	Luna Arjona				Luna Arjona			
Sr. López	Carlos Segundo				Mario Castañeda			
Sr. Lorenzo Villavicencio	Manuel "El Loco" Valdés							
Sra. Villavicencio	Ginny Hoffman							
Chichi	Animal sounds only		Humberto Solórzano					
La Llorona / Yoltzin	Mentioned	Rocío Lara (Llorona) Mercedes Hernández (Yoltzin)	Flashback	Opening cameo	Opening cameo			
Tiro and Pujo		Humberto Solórzano (Tiro) Andrés Couturier (Pujo)	Humberto Solórzano					
Pecas		Jesús Guzmán			Roberto Gutiérrez			
Kika		Mónica del Carmen						
Rosa		Rosario Zúñiga						
Willy		Miguel Couturier						
Beto		Erick Cañete						
El Charro Negro			Blas García	Humberto Solórzano	Erick Elías			
Valentina "Luis"			Alejandra Müller	Picture only				
Rousseau			Andrés Couturier		Andrés Couturier			
Rosendo			Miguel Ángel Ghigliazza		Miguel Ángel Ghigliazza			
Gloria			Diana Alonso		Alondra Hidalgo			
Denise			Diana Alonso					
Don Gaspar			José Luis Orozco					
Suegro Tzulik			Gerardo Reyero					
Doctor Merolick				Eduardo "Lalo" España				
Juanita				Laura G				
Capitán Mandujano				Oscar Flores				
General Torreblanca				Oscar Flores				
General Galeana				Mario Arvizu				
Cacomixtle				Carlo Vázquez				
Chupacabra / Puma				César Garduza				
Beatriz					Andrea Arruti			
Rupertino					Oscar Flores			
Ana la Gitana					Karen Vallejo			
Marcella							Alondra Hidalgo	
Aniceto						Bruno Bichir		
Chimo						Alex Casas		
Moira						Priscila "Cajafresca"		
Eva						Daniela Ibañez		
Deveriux						Germán Fabregat		
Tommy Rojas						Pascual		
Chuletl						Eduardo Ramírez Pablo		

== Crew ==
Role	Films							
Role	The Legend of La Nahuala	The Legend of La Llorona	The Legend of the Guanajuato Mummies	The Legend of the Chupacabra	The Legend of the Black Charro	Legends El Origen	The Legend of the Chaneques	The Revenge of the Black Charro
Role	2007	2011	2014	2016	2018	2022	2023	2026
Director	Ricardo Arnaiz	Alberto Rodríguez	Alberto Rodríguez	Alberto Rodríguez	Alberto Rodríguez	Ricardo Arnaiz	Marvick Núñez	Marvick Núñez
Producer(s)	Jean Pierre Leleu; Ricardo Arnaiz	Fernando de Fuentes; José C. García de Letona	Fernando de Fuentes; José C. García de Letona	Fernando de Fuentes; José C. García de Letona	Fernando de Fuentes; José C. García de Letona	Fernando de Fuentes; José C. García de Letona	Fernando de Fuentes; José C. García de Letona	Fernando de Fuentes; José C. García de Letona
Associate producer(s)	—N/a	Ricardo Arnaiz	Rogelio Prior	—N/a	—N/a	—N/a	—N/a	—N/a
Executive producer(s)	Socorro Aguilar; Eduardo Jiménez Ahuactzin; Paul Rodoreda Núñez	Alex Garcia	Mariana Suárez Molnar; Ricardo Arnaiz	Mariana Suárez Molnar	Mariana Suárez Molnar; Alberto Rodríguez; Alex Garcia	Alberto Rodríguez; Mariana Suárez Molnar	Alberto Rodríguez; Mariana Suárez Molnar	Alberto Rodríguez; Alicia Núñez Puerto
Line producer(s)	—N/a	Gabriela Salazar; Francisco Hirata	Nihurka Zequera Guiza	Michelle Chisikovsky	Nihurka Zequera Guiza	Francisco de Negri	María Isabel Figueroa; Karin Salazar González	María Isabel Figueroa
Writer(s)	Omar Mustre; Antonio Garci	Omar Mustre; Ricardo Arnaiz; Jesús Guzmán; Story/Based on Characters Created by: Ricardo Arnaiz	Alberto Rodríguez; Dulce María Guerrero; Ricardo Arnaiz; Jesús Guzmán; Based on Characters Created by: Ricardo Arnaiz	Alberto Rodríguez; Acán Cohen; Based on Characters Created by: Ricardo Arnaiz	Alberto Rodríguez; David Israel; Based on Characters Created by: Ricardo Arnaiz	Angel Pulido; Original Idea/Based on Characters Created by: Ricardo Arnaiz	David Israel Hernández; Based on Characters Created by: Ricardo Arnaiz	
Composer(s)	Gabriel Villar	Leoncio Lara	Leoncio Lara	Leoncio Lara	Leoncio Lara	Leoncio Lara	Leoncio Lara	Manuel Borda
Editor	—N/a	Roberto Bolado	Roberto Bolado	Alberto Rodríguez	Alberto Rodríguez	Alberto Rodríguez	Carlos Dayan Motta	Carlos Dayan Motta

== Box-office results ==
Film	Release date	Box office gross (MXN) (est.)	Box office gross (USD) (est.)	Budget	Reference(s)
La Leyenda de la Nahuala	1 November 2007	$42.2 million	$4.03 million	—N/a	
La Leyenda de la Llorona	21 October 2011	$55.4 million	$2.9 million	$1.3 million	
La Leyenda de las Momias de Guanajuato	30 October 2014	$92.25 million	$6.3 million	$1.3 million	
La Leyenda del Chupacabras	21 October 2016	$100.7 million	$5.4 million	$1.6 million	
La Leyenda del Charro Negro	19 January 2018	$100.8 million	$5.3 million		
La venganza del Charro Negro	22 October 2026	$269 million	$10.6 million	$1.14 million	
Total		$660.35 million	$34.53 million	$5.34 million	

Note: The films that did not receive a theatrical release are not listed here.

== See also ==
- Ánima
- Huevocartoon
- Animex Producciones
