= Las pellizcadas de Margara =

- Starring: Eduardo España
- Country of origin: Mexico

Production
- Production locations: Telehit Studios; Mexico City, Federal District

Original release
- Network: Telehit
- Release: present

Las pellizcadas de Margara is a television show from the Mexican TV network Telehit hosted by Eduardo España in his character Doña Margara Francisca.
