= La leyenda de los Chaneques =

- Release poster
- Directed by: Marvick Núñez
- Written by: David Israel
- Based on: Characters by Ricardo Arnaiz
- Produced by: José C. García de Letona; Fernando De Fuentes
- Starring: Benny Emmanuel; Emilio Treviño
- Edited by: Carlos Dayan Motta
- Music by: Leoncio Lara Bon
- Production company: Ánima
- Distributed by: ViX
- Release date: 14 July 2023
- Running time: 89 minutes
- Country: Mexico
- Language: Spanish
- Budget: $1.1 million

La leyenda de los Chaneques is a 2023 Mexican animated horror-adventure film produced by Ánima. Directed by Marvick Núñez, it is the seventh installment to the Leyendas series, and is a direct follow-up to La leyenda del Charro Negro. The film's story focuses on the Chaneque folklore.

It was released on ViX on July 14, 2023.

== Plot ==
Five years after the events of Charro Negro, Leo and Nando journey to Veracruz where they meet a boy whose father was kidnapped by the Chaneques. To combat them, Leo would have to face them without his powers he once had.

== Voice cast ==
- Benny Emmanuel as Leonardo "Leo" San Juan
- Emilio Treviño as Fernando "Nando" San Juan
- Paola Ramones as Moribunda
- Jesús Guzmán as Finado
- Eduardo España as Evaristo
- Mayté Cordeiro as Teodora
- Annie Rojas as Xochitl
- Andrés Couturier as Don Andrés
- Gabriel Basurto as Alebrije

== Development ==
After the release of La leyenda del Charro Negro, there were speculations and rumors as to whether it would be the series' final film. Leyendas creator Ricardo Arnaiz has mentioned the possibilities of new entries and potential. Producer Fernando de Fuentes has confirmed the development of the seventh Leyendas film, adding that it "has been a successful franchise". Arnaiz himself confirmed he's not involved in the film.

Upon its trailer release in July 2023, the film was officially confirmed, titled La leyenda de los Chaneques. The film is confirmed to be directed by Marvick Núñez.

In an interview with El Universal, Núñez explained about the chaneque characteristics, and how they were portrayed in the film. "The important thing about Leo is that he is not like Van Helsing[...] he is not a monster hunter, but he can see the tormented side of [the chaneques] and helps them to reach the light" he said. Benny Emmanuel, the voice of Leo San Juan, said that he "grew up with the saga" and has watched the first two films of the Leyendas before being first cast in Momias de Guanajuato. He said, "[...]it was strange when I did the casting because he was a character I knew". In an interview with Out of Focus, Núñez further stressed about the challenges of materializing the design and personality of the mythical creatures, requiring a lot of research. Comparing to past installments, he said that the "chaneques are another case, because there is no direct visual reference". "Historians do not agree on what is or is not a chaneque," continued Núñez. "If it is the representation of a child, a ghost, the spirit of a tree or what. That's why we bet on creating them from scratch." For personality, the director detailed the creatures as "primitive beings[...] in charge of caring for nature". The film's setting in Veracruz was chosen after the first draft of the script was completed, as the chaneques' believed origin place.

=== Animation ===
The film uses 2D animation, with CG elements. After working on La liga de los 5, Núñez said during an interview that the film incorporated 2D-CG elements into the film beyond backgrounds. "We thought, we have to elevate this mixture of 2D and 3D," said Núñez. "[...]because the idea now went beyond having a moving background, [and] now we wanted the whole environment to feel alive."

=== Music ===
Series composer Leoncio Lara has prodived the film's score.

== Release ==
As with Las leyendas: el origen, the film premiered on ViX on 14 July 2023 as an original film.

== Sequel ==
A new installment, titled La venganza del Charro Negro, was released on October 22, 2026.
