= La leyenda del Chupacabras =

Legend Quest: The Legend of Chupacabras
- Theatrical release poster
- Spanish: La Leyenda del Chupacabras
- Literally: The Legend of The Chupacabras
- Directed by: Alberto Rodríguez
- Written by: Acán Cohen; Alberto Rodríguez
- Based on: Characters by Ricardo Arnaiz
- Produced by: José C. García de Letona; Fernando de Fuentes S
- Starring: Benny Emmanuel; Mayte Cordeiro; Eduardo España; Laura G; Herman López; Emilio Treviño; Oscar Flores; Andrés Couturier; Carlo Vázquez; Mario Arvizu
- Edited by: Alberto Rodríguez
- Music by: Leoncio Lara
- Production company: Ánima Estudios
- Distributed by: Videocine
- Release date: October 21, 2016
- Running time: 82 minutes
- Country: Mexico
- Language: Spanish English
- Budget: $1.6 million
- Box office: MX$100.7 million (US$5.4 million)

Legend Quest: The Legend of Chupacabras (released in Latin America as La Leyenda del Chupacabras) is a 2016 Mexican animated comedy horror film directed by Alberto Rodríguez. Produced by Ánima Estudios, the film is the fourth installment to the Leyenda film series and its story is inspired by the chupacabras legend.

The film was released theatrically in the United States on October 14, 2016 in limited release, distributed by Pantelion Films and Lionsgate, and in Mexico on October 21, 2016,

The film is a major box-office success, grossing a total of $100.7 million pesos during its theatrical run in Mexico.

== Plot ==
Taking place right after the events in Guanajuato, Leo San Juan has a nightmare involving a man wearing a black charro uniform. Before the man can do any harm, Leo is awakened by a man named Mandujano and a group of travelers, telling old war stories in a wagon heading to Leo's hometown, Puebla. As they talk, Leo catches sight of a rebel flag hidden in Madujano's bag, but asks no questions after Mandujano shushes him. When they are warned of a random checkpoint by Spanish royalists coming up ahead, one of the men, Galeana, is forced to flee. It turns out that he is a high-ranking member of the royalist-opposing insurgency, and the rest of the men in the cart are also rebels. Lieutenant Mandujano confirms that they are part of a great war, and Leo agrees to keep their secret as they approach the soldiers. Royalist Sergeant Zubieta questions Leo and the other men and seems receptive to their cover story of being musicians on their way home to celebrate a baptism. However, one of the soldiers spots Galeana fleeing in the distance, blowing the men's cover and leading to a stand-off. The soldier Licona takes Leo and holds him at gunpoint, which moves Mandujano and his comrades to surrender.

The group is taken into custody along with pale, decrepit named Dr. Merolick, to be brought forth in front of the ruthless General Torreblanca. Torreblanca promises Leo his freedom in exchange for information, but Leo's silence enrages the general. He has the prisoners escorted to an abandoned monastery and, despite his men's horror, orders that Leo be executed alongside the rest of the group as his silence makes him complicit. Up in the mountains, as the group is taken to a holding cell, Leo recognizes one of the royalist soldiers: it is his older brother Fernando (Nando), who doesn't react to the sight Leo.

As night falls, a soldier set to guard the chapel turned storage room grows curious about the painted caravan that was taken into custody along with Dr. Merolick. While his partner insists they'll be able to sort through it freely after its owner is executed, the other man insists on going into the chapel to inspect it. Once inside, one of the men sees a humanoid figure standing in the middle of the room, which he mistakes for the chapel's priest - the figure suddenly turns red eyes on the men, who begin screaming. Soon, the rest of the royalists catch wind of the blood-sucking creature loose on the grounds and begin desperate efforts to contain it, while a detachment leaves for the encampment to alert Torreblanca about what's happening. Back in the holding cell, the men's conversation about possible escape is cut short by sounds of screaming and agony coming from outside. Frightened by the soldier's retreat, they bang on the bars of their cell to no avail. After a few heartstopping minutes, Nando appears: he only pretended not to notice his brother to help him, quickly prying the lock off the cell.

Outside, the men encounter confusion as the soldiers wander around, weapons drawn, as the monster (identified as Chupacabras by Merolick) hunts them down. They are joined by a few royalists and break up. Teodora unexpectedly appears to Leo as Nando looks on in secret: he begs her for help, asking her to get her what information she can find about the Chupacabras. Teodora leaves to enlist Evaristo and Alebrije's help, accidentally ruining Alebrije's date with Evaristo's sister in the process. They reach a ghost town in search of information, where Teodora is entrapped in a spell cast by an evil cacomixtle.

Back at camp, Torreblanca is alerted of the situation and orders the bridge that connects the mountaintop monastery to terra firma brought down, even though some of his men remain unaccounted for. Trapped, the group splits up again to avoid attacks. After mistaking Leo for the Chupacabras, the group finds a worn set of blueprints for the monastery. They identify two escape routes, one that takes them through the open square where the Chupacabras is hunting and another one that takes them out the back through an aged aqueduct system.

Back in the ghost town, Teodora speaks to Juanita, the girl held captive beside her by the cacomixtle. Juanita tells her of the Natikary, creatures summoned by her people for help with the weather and their crops. The Natikary and Juanita's people lived alongside each other in peace, mediated by a magical item called the Iyari, until a twisted man appeared. This man conned Juanita's people and took control of the Iyari, then enslaved the Natikary and sold them as exotic creatures. He kept the last of the Natikary, a mated pair with a young offspring, for himself; Juanita had been searching for these last Natikary when she was captured. Before the conversation can go further, the cacomixtle puts a pair of enchanted glasses on Teodora which enslaves her to his bidding. He sends her off to capture the rest of their team. While Teodora successfully traps Evaristo, along with Finado and Moribunda the sugar skulls, Alebrije continues to evade capture.

After long minutes of disorientation, Leo's group finds the aqueduct structure and starts the trek down. The deserter Puma abandons the rest of the group in a panic and vanishes into the mist. The aged construction is strained when the Chupacabras discovers the fleeing group and attacks, forcing them to turn back. When a section of the bridge breaks off, captain Mandujano bravely throws himself at the Chupacabras to allow Leo to escape. The remaining men, along with Leo and Nando, retreat to the monastery where they decide on a riskier plan: they will lure the Chupacabras into the unstable ruins of the capitanía and bring the roof down on its head. This will give them time to locate another escape route, hidden under the baptismal font in the abandoned chapel. Meanwhile, Alebrije breaks the cacomixtle's hold over Teodora by reminding her of their friendship using the pictures in her cellphone. They decide to rescue the others by having Teodora pretend to still be under the cacomixtle's magical influence. Juanita identifies a poster as the man who stole the Iyari: the cacomixtle's boss, Merolick. Teodora is found out by the cacomixtle and turned into a glass figurine, but he is defeated thanks to Finado and Moribunda's intervention. After Juanita explains that the Iyari's hold will be broken if the two parts of this medallion are joined, Teodora leaves to tell Leo.

Back at the monastery, the group manages to collapse the roof on the Chupacabras, but Merolick is then seen knocking one of the soldiers unconscious. Leo and Nando make it to the chapel, where Leo's attention is caught by Merolick's caravan. They are interrupted when Merolick enters the chapel and locks it behind him, telling them that the rest of their companions are dead and that they must find the tunnel. Frantic knocking once more interrupts the search, revealing that Merolick had lied, but Nando is knocked out and Leo is blinded by a handful of dirt to his eyes before they can react. Having incapacitated his enemies, Merolick admits that the Chupacabras is attacking them because he has its mate and offspring in his caravan. He admits he aspired to fame and fortune by displaying the creatures as freaks as he douses the area in oil, which he sets on fire before escaping down the tunnel. Teodora appears just in time to help them down the tunnel (as the chapel's door is blocked by fire), where a dazed Nando momentarily gains the ability to see and hear her.

Leo and Nando emerge back at the encampment, where they once more encounter Puma and Merolick. Torreblanca has Nando moved to the infirmary but orders Leo, Puma and Merolick executed by firing squad immediately. The group is spared when commander Galeana returns at the head of a massive insurgent force and the royalists must divert their attention to the attack. Alerted by Teodora, Leo takes part of the Iyari medallion from Merolick and escapes back up the mountain to aid the Chupacabras. Afraid of the Chupacabras' vengeance, Merolick steals a cannon and prepares to shoot down the creature and the chapel.

Back in the flaming chapel, Leo discovers the Chupacabras' mate and offspring trapped behind magical bars in Merolick's caravan. He is attacked by the Chupacabras but saved by captain Zubieta, who holds off the monster (and is drained in the process). The rest of the stranded soldiers appear on the roof and offer Leo a rope, which he uses to rescue Zubieta's body. Leo finds the missing half of the Iyari medallion in a secret compartment of the caravan and finally puts it together, allowing the Chupacabras's family to break free. The reunion is nearly cut short by Merolick, who angrily fires the cannon: he hits the base of the church, causing it to collapse with Leo still inside. At the last minute, Leo is pulled out of the air and returned to the cliff by a grateful Chupacabras. Upon seeing Zubieta's body, the creature also returns him his life force. Zubieta returns to life, and the Chupacabras flies off with his family.

The groups finally reunite. Despite his own insistence that he be executed alongside his regiment, Torreblanca and his few loyal royalists (along with Merolick) are bundled into a cart by captain Galeana and sent to virrey Villegas, with a letter from General Morelos requesting the virrey's peaceful resignation. Galeana then invites Leo and Nando to join the cause, an offer Leo gallantly turns down in both their names, in favor of going home to their grandmother. Galeana instead presents Leo with the rebel flag Mandujano had been guarding as a sign of his gratitude.

In a post-credits scene, Teodora cashes in Leo's promise to let her give him a makeover. As she snaps pictures of herself, Leo and Nando with her cellphone, the man from Leo's nightmare lurks ominously over them on his horse.

== Cast ==
Role	(Mexico) Actor (Original)	English Language Dubbing
Leo San Juan	Benny Emmanuel	Antonio Amadeo
El Alebrije de la Biblioteca	Herman López	Alex Teixeira
Teodora Villavicencio	Mayté Cordeiro	Paula Andrea Barros
Evaristo	Eduardo "Lalo" España	Hernan Andrio Chavarro
Juanita	Laura "G" González	Lissa Grossman Comess
Nando San Juan	Emilio Treviño	Eric Anderson
Soldado Zubieta	Andrés Couturier	Paul Louis Muller
Mary la Pagadora	Diana Alonso	Crystal Lopez
Merolick	Eduardo "Lalo" España	Unknown
Mandujano	Oscar Flores	Unknown
Torreblanca	Oscar Flores	Unknown
Cacomixtle	Carlo Vázquez	James Keller
Garcia	Fernando Hinojosa	Philip Dubois
Jose	Pedro D'Aguillón Jr.	Christopher Jesus Diaz
Soldado Aguilar	Germán Fabregat	Scott Genn
Soldado Campos	Mauricio Pérez	Michael Gallock
Soldado Cosio	Gustavo Adrian Casio Herrera	Alexander Michael Jaramillo
Soldado Hurtado	Andres Campos	Unknown
Soldado Licona	Andres Campos	Unknown
Soldado Sanchez	Andres Campos	Unknown
Soldado Larios	Ricardo Mendoza	Unknown
Soldado Martinez	José Antonio Toledano	Christopher Leigh Jahn
Soldado Nieto	Salvador Chantrés	Unknown
Soldado Ramos	Ismael Castro	Unknown
Torres	Moisés Iván Mora	Unknown
General Galeana	Mario Arvizu	Unknown
Finado	Daniel del Roble	Doug Turkel
Moribunda	Gaby Guzmán	Lindsey Corey
Charro Negro	Humberto Solórzano	Unknown
Puma	César Garduza	Romulo Bernal

== Production ==
=== Animation ===
Unlike its 2 previous installments, which were all animated in the flash animation format, this film is animated in style of traditional animation. The animation is done by Ánima Estudios in Mexico while additional animation were provided by Toon City in the Philippines, Mighty in Mexico, and TeamApp.

Director Alberto Rodríguez stated that the animation process was one of the challenges in the film. "We started with the task of generating a more traditional type of animation that needs more energy, people, and knowledge," said Rodríguez. Producer Fernando de Fuentes said that the America public is not "used to watching 2D [animated] productions."

== Release ==
The film has been first teased on Ánima Estudios' social media on 4 March 2016, naming it the "next installment", tentatively titled "La Leyenda de".

The film was announced for release in Mexico on 21 October 2016. The film's teaser trailer premiered on 26 May 2016. The film's official trailer has been released on 9 September 2016.

The film has been presented at the 2016 Pixelatl Festival in Cuernavaca, Mexico which ran from September 6 to 11, 2016.

A Bugsted short was accompanied with the Mexican release of the film.

At the 2nd Anima Latina Festival in Buenos Aires, Argentina, Chupacabras has won the "Feature Film" prize.

=== U.S. Release ===
The film received a limited theatrical release in the United States, which was released on October 14, 2016, one week prior to its Mexican release, distributed by Pantelion Films and Lionsgate. It was shown in the original Spanish language format with English subtitles.

The film was later released on DVD and Digital HD formats with an English language version on March 7, 2017.

According to producer Jose C. Garcia de Letona, he stated that Chupacabras is the biggest release in the Leyendas franchise as it is the first, not only in the franchise, but also the first film from production company Ánima Estudios to receive a theatrical release in the "major" U.S. market, as well the challenges for the release. "It is a first effort that we are very happy about. The market there is brutal. [I]t is 10 times bigger than ours and today we have 40 million Spanish speakers." Co-producer Fernando de Fuentes also stated that he was satisfied with the reception of the news. "This is the first time we debut a film in the U.S. and we're excited with how well the Latino community has received the news of the film," he said.

Director Alberto Rodriguez, who previously directed Llorona and Momias, said that the success of the past installments were "unexpected" and "sensational", and said that, "[It] made us think that maybe we could repeat that success in the United States." He said that the film's story included the "chupacabras" since the legendary creature has been widely recognized among the Hispanic culture in the United States.

== Reception ==
=== Box office ===
To date, there is currently no U.S. box-office data released for the film.

In Mexico, the film debuted at #2 on its opening weekend, grossing $40,909,034 pesos (approx. US$2.2 million), with an audience of 1 million.

The film grossed a total of $100.7 million pesos.

=== Critical response ===
The film has received negative reviews from critics upon its release, with criticism focused on the film's writing, darker tone, bland humor, and short story, serving the Chupacabras as a joke from the title. On Rotten Tomatoes, the film has a rating of 25%, based on 8 reviews.

=== Accolades ===
Awards and nominations

Year	Award	Category	Nominees	Result
2017	Premios Luminus 2017	Mejor Película de Animación	Alberto Rodríguez	Won
2017	4th Platino Awards	Best Animated Film	Alberto Rodríguez	Nominated
2017	Ánima Latina 2017	Mejor Largometraje de Animación	Alberto Rodríguez	Won

== Sequel ==
A fifth installment titled, La Leyenda del Charro Negro was released on 19 January 2018.

== See also ==
- Ánima Estudios
- Chupacabra
- La Leyenda de la Nahuala
- La Leyenda de la Llorona
- La Leyenda de las Momias
- La Leyenda del Charro Negro
