= La leyenda de la Llorona =

2011 Mexican animated film

La Leyenda de la Llorona
- Mexican theatrical release poster
- Spanish: La Leyenda de la Llorona
- Literally: The Legend of the Crying lady
- Directed by: Alberto Rodríguez
- Screenplay by: Omar Mustre; Alberto Rodríguez; Ricardo Arnaiz; Jesús Guzmán
- Story by: Ricardo Arnaiz
- Based on: Characters by Ricardo Arnaiz
- Produced by: Fernando de Fuentes; José C. García de Letona
- Starring: Yair Prado; Monica del Carmen; Rafael Inclán; Andrés Couturier; Mayte Cordeiro; Rocio Lara
- Edited by: Roberto Bolado
- Music by: Leoncio Lara
- Production company: Ánima Estudios
- Distributed by: Videocine
- Release date: October 21, 2011
- Running time: 75 minutes
- Country: Mexico
- Language: Spanish
- Box office: MX$55.4 million (US$2.9 million)

Legend Quest: The Legend of La Llorona (released in Hispanic America as La Leyenda de la Llorona) is a Mexican animated horror adventure comedy film based on the legend of La Llorona. The second installment of the Leyendas film saga, it is a sequel to La Leyenda de la Nahuala, which was a box-office success.

Produced by Ánima Estudios, the film was released in Mexico on October 21, 2011, grossing $55.4 million pesos.

The English-subtitled version of the film was also released in direct-to-video and digital platforms in the United States, distributed by Pantelion Films and Lionsgate.

== Plot ==
Beto and his little sister Kika are asking for "calaverita" (a Mexican tradition of asking for candies and fruits from neighbors) in a village of Xochimilco on a deserted, dark and foggy night. Kika very loudly begins asking for candies, which causes Beto to become nervous. While waiting for Kika to come back from a house that is far down the street, Beto spots an eerie figure going in her direction. In order to save his sister, he calls out the ghost's name, "La Llorona"; she hears and precedes to chase after him. Kika finds Beto missing, looks for him, and finds him just in time to see him taken by La Llorona near the creek.

Sometime later, a balloon with a ship basket carrying five companions is flying over the town. The companions are Leo San Juan, a young boy, Don Andres, an old knight (similar to Don Quijote), Alebrije, a fire-breathing colorful dragon-like creature and Moribunda and Finado, two skeleton-like kids resembling calaveras (sugar skulls). They're heading toward the village in response to Padre Tello's letter which asked for their help. They summon a ghost friend Teodora, who has helped them in previous adventures, but she disappears right before the storm after teasing Leo. During the storm, Moribunda falls out of the basket, and Leo saves her, but falls from the balloon into Kika's boat, who's sailing down a river at the time, possibly looking for Beto. Kika accidentally knocks Leo into the water, then discovers his letter from Padre Tello, and then accidentally hits him with her paddle, knocking him out (she pulls him out of the water offscreen). Kika sees the damaged balloon he's fallen from heading toward La Isla de las Muñecas (Dolls' Island).

San Juan wakes up at Kika's house under her and Beto's mother's care. The mother, Rosa, tells him a story of La Llorona, whose name was actually Yoltzin instead of María. Yoltzin moved to Xochimilco with her two kids: Ollin and Tonatiuh. She sold flowers to provide for her family and became well-liked in the village. Everything changed one day when they were coming back home to find their house on fire. Yoltzin jumped off the boat, desperate to save the house, but forgot her kids on the boat, which drifted away with them still on board. When she realized that they were floating away, it was too late and they disappeared without a trace. Villagers helped her searching for the kids. Days later, though, Ollin and Tonatiuh were found dead near a channel, possibly due to drowning and their bodies must have washed up onshore. Yoltzin didn't accept her children's death. She was driven crazy with grief and remorse and died, with having nothing left to live for. After her death, the villagers started to hear ghostly moans. Yoltzin had become La Llorona, a specter who came out at night to kidnap children, though with no intent to harm them; rather, she seemed to want to take care of them, maybe to make up for failing to take care of her own children or actually believing they are her children. Padre Tello followed La Llorona for years, trying to find out how to appease La Llorona until he disappeared. San Juan leaves Kika's house to find his friends and figures out the mystery of where Beto and the other kidnapped kids are with help of Padre Tello's journal. Kika follows him, telling Leo that he needs her. La Llorona attacks Leo and Kika, injuring Leo, but Kika helps him and listens to his plans to find the old church where Ollin and Tonatiuh's graves are. Padre Tello's book says that "Yoltzin has to see" the graves to be at peace. Once again, Leo and Kika are chased by La Llorona, but this time Kika is kidnapped and Leo loses her trail.

Meanwhile, at Isla de las Muñecas (Doll's Island), Andres is tangled in vines. After a lot of screaming, he is rescued from the puppets by Alebrije, who was all covered in green slime after falling in the lake and mistaken for a monster. Andres and Alebrije free an old man from a cursed hand puppet named Pecas, who was animated by the tears of La Llorona, who had previously cried at the creek and had been forcing the old man to make puppets for her. The old man thanks them and tells them where to find La Llorona.

Leo San Juan asks Teodora to help him seek La Llorona and distract her while he looks for the old church where Yoltzin's kids were buried. Leo goes into a sunken church, and inside he finds Kika and other kids sleeping. He sees that La Llorona has been taking care of them and that they were unharmed. He runs deep down in the church until he finds the church's crypt and searches for Ollin and Tonatiuh's graves. He finds a broken part of the kids' graves when he's looking for his dropped necklace (with a picture of his deceased mother inside) and puts it back into the grave, fixing it. Kika angers La Llorona, telling her to let the other kids go, and she almost has her soul taken by La Llorona but Leo saves her. La Llorona grabs Leo and starts taking his soul, causing him to pass out, then captures his friends by animating vines that had overtaken the sunken church. When she is about to hurt them, Leo calls out to her and shows her child's name in the grave. When La Llorona sees their names, she begins to see the unconscious Leo and Kika as her children, dead. Overcome with guilt, she collapses to her knees and cries. However, all the tombstones begin to glow and Ollin and Tonatiuh appear. She is reunited with her kids and thanks Leo for his help. Leo sees his mother one last time while he is unconscious. Soon, all of them (except Leo) depart from the living world and go to the world of the dead. Other kidnapped children wake up including Beto. Back in the village Leo and his friends say farewell to the villagers, then get ready to go back to their hometown when Padre Godofredo's ghost appears and urges them to help another town in distress. He explains that Xochitl, a friend of theirs, who had also helped them before, was taken captive by mummies in Guanajuato. They then sail off to Guanajuato in order to save her.

== Box office ==
This film opened at #4, earning $8.3 million pesos (USD$0.6 million) at the Mexican box office. It grossed a total of $55.4 million pesos.

== Reception ==
The film has received a favorable review. Renee Schonfeld of Common Sense Media gave it 3 out of 5 stars, and wrote, "Filled with wonderfully inventive animation, witty dialogue, and rich characterizations, La Leyenda de La Llorona is a treat for kids who read well enough to manage the subtitles, and who won't be upset by the legend of a dead woman who believes she is responsible for the death of her young children. There are scares, laughs, and, underlying all, a soothing premise -- that a mother's love is 'a boundless and most precious gift protecting children in this world and the next.' This is a good movie to share as a family and might be a good subtitle starter movie."

== Sequels ==
The film is followed by La Leyenda de las Momias, released on 30 October 2014, La Leyenda del Chupacabras, released in the United States on October 14, 2016, and La Leyenda del Charro Negro, released on 19 January 2018.

== See also ==
- The Curse of La Llorona - Another film adaptation of the "Llorona" figure directed by James Wan.
