= La leyenda de la Nahuala =

La Leyenda de la Nahuala
- Theatrical release poster
- Directed by: Ricardo Arnaiz
- Written by: Omar Mustre; Antonio Garci
- Produced by: Soco Aguilar; Ricardo Arnaiz
- Starring: Fabrizio Santini; Bruno Coronel; Ofelia Medina; Germán Robles; María Santander; Luna Arjona; Andrés Bustamante; Jesús Ochoa; Rafael Inclán; Martha Higareda; María Teresa Cordeiro; Manuel 'Loco' Valdés; Pierre Angelo
- Music by: Gabriel Villar
- Production companies: Animex Producciones; Nahuala Producciones; Finecine
- Distributed by: Artecinema
- Release date: 1 November 2007
- Running time: 86 minutes
- Country: Mexico
- Language: Spanish
- Budget: MX$18 million
- Box office: MX$42.2 million (US$4.03 million)

Legend Quest: The Legend of The Nahuala (released in Latin America as La Leyenda de la Nahuala) is a 2007 Mexican animated horror comedy film released in theaters on November 1, 2007 in Mexico. It was the fourth animated feature film in Mexico to be released, and the first to be exhibited in DTS. The film was a box-office success on its opening weekend, grossing a total of $42.2 million pesos (US$4.03 million). It was produced by Soco Aguilar and Ricardo Arnaiz and directed by Arnaíz.

It was later released direct-to-video in the United States in 2008.

== Plot ==
The film takes place on the Day of the Dead of 1807 in the 19th century, in the city of Puebla, New Spain. A narrator starts the plot off with a story about an abandoned house in Puebla, which is haunted by a malevolent force known as “La Nahuala.” 52 years ago, it was the home of the affluent Villavicencio family, who were holding a feast for family and friends for the Day of the Dead. Unbeknownst to them, they were being haunted by a malignant nahuatl who wanted to become all powerful. It killed and possessed the cook's body, turning the woman into La Nahuala, a witchly host, and initiated a ritual to take over. La Nahuala ends up killing the Villavicencio family by poisoning their soups and murders the rest of the household. Among those killed are the Villavicencio’s young daughter Teodora and Teodora’s servant Xochitl as ritual sacrifices, but before La Nahuala could finish her final victim she was "stopped.” However, her soul and the souls of all the people she killed are trapped in the abandoned house - and it is said she still awaits for a child to come near the manor at night so she can finally complete the ritual.

The story ends as it is revealed to have been told by a mischievous boy named Nando San Juan, who told the story to his nervous and cowardly younger brother Leo San Juan, whom he enjoys teasing. Just as Nando scares Leo, the two boys are herded to mass by their grandmother and their nanny. Leo (who serves as altar boy) can't stop thinking of the legend of La Nahuala during the service and his trembling causes a series of accidents that disturb mass and humiliate Friar Godofredo, the Franciscan friar who officiates mass. Despite the mess, Friar Godofredo only gently reprimands Leo and soothes his fears by assuring him that La Nahuala is dead. Friar Godofredo then shows him his hot air balloon, promising to take Leo on a ride once the balloon is ready to fly.

During the festivities, Leo is shunned by two children in front of the seemingly kindly Santos' candy stand for his stuttering and for peeing when he's afraid (a fact Nando has been spreading). Santos assures Leo that the Villavicencio house isn't haunted - he says Leo should confront his fears by going into the house, and gifts him with a golden medallion: the Medallion of Miquitzli, which he claims keeps fear at bay. Before the two part, Santos gives Leo a brief show of the fireworks he has just acquired. Back at home, Leo's good mood is ruined when his nanny Dionisia gives him a large order of bread to be delivered to a Señor Machorro (later revealed to be Santos) at number ten Nahuala street, the very street where the abandoned Villavicencio house stands. Leo makes it to the front of the abandoned house, where Nando unexpectedly jumps out and frightens him; the shock makes Leo pee himself and drop the bread. Adding insult to injury, Nando steals the medallion of Miquitzli from Leo and dodges into the Villavicencio house, pretending to be caught by La Nahuala to further humiliate Leo. As Leo sadly walks away, the medallion begins to glow, and Leo turns in time to see a ghostly hand burst from the house and drag a screaming Nando inside.

Leo goes to Friar Godofredo for help. The elderly friar reveals to him the real story of La Nahuala: 52 years ago, a young Friar Godofredo and a Nahua shaman joined forces to hunt the nahuatl when they caught wind of the appearance of La Nahuala in the Villavicencio house. The two men led a mob to the house, where La Nahuala prepared to consume the souls of Teodora, Xochitl, and Teodora's friend, Toñita San Juan, who is revealed to be Leo and Nando's own grandmother. The party arrived too late to save Xochitl and Teodora, but Toñita resisted, ripping the medallion of Miquitzli from La Nahuala's neck and upsetting the ritual as Friar Godofredo and the shaman fought the witch. Although the ritual's failure stopped La Nahuala from gaining immortality and power, her spirit took over the house, leaving the friar and the shaman no choice but to seal the house and evacuate Toñita and the cook's young son, the only two survivors. Friar Godofredo warns that he must destroy the medallion before the night is over or La Nahuala will come back to life, prompting Leo to run back into the Villavicencio house. Friar Godofredo tries to run after him and is overcome by exhaustion. When he runs into Santos and attempts to enlist his help, the candymaker instead knocks Friar Godofredo unconscious.

Inside the house, Leo runs into various frightening sights including two living sugar skulls, finally running into the ghost of Xochitl. The girl offers him her help, explaining that La Nahuala will enslave the dead and feed on the souls of all the living in Puebla if she can conclude the ritual (apparently using Nando's soul as a replacement). The house itself seems resolved to kill Leo with living knives, lava-spewing pots and other apparitions. They also run into trouble from the cursed skeletons of the Villavicencios and their guests, who are starved and want to eat Leo. After escaping them, they run into the ghost of Teodora: though friendly to Xochitl, she is stuck up and spoiled. Leo has to trick her into opening the door to the next area of the house by convincing Teodora that her hairbrush is on the other side of a locked door she initially refuses to open.

Elsewhere, Santos threatens Fray Godofredo. He reveals that he is aware of the medallion's power and orchestrated the night's events, as he was the young boy that was rescued from the Villavicencio house 52 years before: the son of the cook La Nahuala possessed. He is resentful of Friar Godofredo for sealing his mother away and manipulated Leo into entering in hopes of finally being with his mother again. Before he can hurt him, however, Friar Godofredo escapes. At the San Juan Bakery, Toñita finds her grandsons missing and rushes to the abandoned house with Dionisia when she concludes it must be La Nahuala's doing.

Back at the abandoned house, the approach of midnight increases La Nahuala's powers. She makes Teodora and Xochitl succumb to her influence and confronts Leo, letting him choose between staying and leaving. She releases nightmarish apparitions on him when he insists he will stay to rescue his brother. The chase leads Leo to the house's library, where he meets a dragon alebrije and the Don Quijote-like ghost Don Andrés. The Alebrije (who presents himself as the Library Alebrije) reveals that La Nahuala can take any shape she wishes and puts Leo through a series of tests to make sure he isn't the evil spirit. When the boy passes all three, Alebrije concludes that Leo is not La Nahuala, but rather a boy singled out by destiny. Alebrije then shows Leo a vision of a warrior using a black skull to destroy something (referred to as 'the evil') inside the medallion to destroy the spirit.

Leo runs into the house's chapel, where he is captured by La Nahuala. She reveals that it was Leo's soul she wanted for the ritual, and had used Nando as bait. Though his grandmother, and then Friar Godofredo, attempt to stop them, Santos knocks the old woman unconscious and fiercely battles Fray Godofredo to allow La Nahuala to complete the ritual. After La Nahuala's spell rebounds on them by way of Friar Godofredo using the skull of Tezcatlipoca's mirror, Santos begs his mother for help with his wounds. To his horror, La Nahuala finally reveals she isn't Santos's mother, but that she consumed his mother's soul and has chosen to look like her to keep Santos in her service. Betrayed and regretful, Santos sacrifices himself to allow Leo to escape. With Nando's help, and under directions from a dying Friar Godofredo, Leo uses the black skull of Tezcatlipoca to confuse La Nahuala, then hurls the skull on the evil that emerges from the medallion of Miquitzli. Once it's destroyed, a defeated Nahuala turns to stone.

Before he passes on, Friar Godofredo bequeaths Leo his crucifix and declares himself at peace in the knowledge that Leo remains to defend Puebla. Freed from La Nahuala's influence, Teodora and Xochitl also move on (but not before kissing Leo's cheek in gratitude). A regretful Santos is collected by the spirit of his real mother, Nahuala, who forgives him for his trespasses. Santos rejuvenates into a ten year old boy as he ascends to heaven hand in hand with his mother. Before the night ends, Leo gently ridicules Nando for peeing himself in terror after the two sugar skulls (who reveal themselves to be on Leo's side) sneak up on him.

A year later on the feast of the Day of the Dead, the San Juan Bakery is visited by a crowd of spirits: Santos, the Villavicencio family, Xochitl, Teodora, Don Andrés and even Fray Godofredo. The ghostly friar also relays a message to Leo: he must travel to Xochimilco, which is besieged by La Llorona. He, along with Alebrije, Don Andrés and the two sugar skulls (named Finado and Moribunda) depart on Friar Godofredo's hot air balloon.

== Cast ==
- Fabrizio Santini as Leonardo "Leo" San Juan
- Bruno Coronel as Fernando "Nando" San Juan
- Ofelia Medina as La Nahuala / Nahuala Machorro
- Germán Robles as Friar Godofredo
- María Santander as Toñita San Juan
- Luna Arjona as Nana Dionisia
- Andrés Bustamante as Don Andrés
- Jesús Ochoa as Santos Machorro
- Rafael Inclán as Alebrije
- Martha Higareda as Xóchitl
- Mayté Cordeiro (as María Teresa Cordeiro) as Teodora Villavicencio
- Manuel 'Loco' Valdés as Lorenzo Villavicencio
- Pierre Angelo as blind man
- Verónica De Ita as Sra. Pérez
- Ginny Hoffman as Sra. López
- Carlos Segundo as Sr. López
- Gabriel Villar as Gaznate seller
- Grecia Villar as Fray Sinfonolo
- Jorge Alberto Aguilera as Himself (voice)

== Release ==
The film was released on October 31, 2007, in Mexico. In the United States release, the film was rated PG "for some scary images, language, thematic elements and rude humor" by the MPAA.

=== Box office ===
The film opened #1 at the Mexican box-office, earning $15,832,363 pesos ($1,479,685 USD). It is one of the most successful releases in Mexican cinema history.

== Production ==
This Mexican animated horror comedy film was produced by Animex Producciones in Puebla, Mexico. It uses a hybrid of 2D and 3D with Adobe After Effects (visual effects and compositing), Adobe Photoshop (background art), Adobe Premiere Pro (editing), Autodesk Maya (computer animation), Avid Media Composer (additional editing), MASSIVE (rendering) and Toon Boom Harmony (traditional and paperless animation) on Microsoft Windows hardware, Dell computers and Wacom tablets.

== Awards and nominations ==
Year	Award	Category	Result	Nominee
2008	Ariel Award	Best Animated Feature (Largometraje de Animación)	Won	Soco Aguilar
2008	Ariel Award	Best Original Score (Música Original)	Nominated	Gabriel Villar
2008	Silver Goddesses	Best Animated Feature (Largometraje de Animación)	Won	Ricardo Arnaiz

== Sequels ==
After the success of the film, a sequel, titled La Leyenda de la Llorona, was released on October 21, 2011. The third film, titled La leyenda de las Momias was released on 30 October 2014 in the 4DX format. Both of the sequels were animated and produced by Ánima Estudios.

A fourth installment, titled La Leyenda del Chupacabras, was released on October 14, 2016 in the United States and October 21, 2016 in Mexico.

The fifth installment, titled La Leyenda del Charro Negro. was released on 19 January 2018.

A sixth installment titled Las Leyendas: El Origen was released exclusively on ViX on 10 August 2022. A seventh installment entitled La Leyenda de los Chaneques appeared on ViX on 14 July 2023.

The trilogy has also been adapted into a Netflix original series, titled Legend Quest, which was released worldwide on 24 February 2017.

== See also ==
- Animex Producciones
- La Leyenda de la Llorona
- La Leyenda de las Momias
- La Leyenda del Chupacabras
- La Leyenda del Charro Negro
- Legend Quest (2017 TV series)
