= Phil Roman Entertainment =

American independent animation studio

Phil Roman Entertainment was an independent animation studio, founded in 1999 by Film Roman's founder Phil Roman.

== Films and series ==
- Grandma Got Run Over by a Reindeer — Co-produced by The Fred Rappoport Company, Inc.
- El Americano: The Movie – Co-produced by Animex Producciones and Olmos Productions
