= Pierre Angelo =

Mexican actor, director and humorist

- Born: Pierre Angelo Antonioli Flores; September 24, 1972 (age 54); Mexico City, Mexico
- Spouse(s): Marisol del Olmo (1999–2010; 1 child)

Comedy career
- Years active: 1983–present
- Medium: Television, Film, Theater
- Genres: Character comedy, Improvisational comedy, Satire/political satire

Pierre Angelo Antonioli Flores (born September 24, 1972) is a Mexican actor, director, and humorist. He was first known for his role in the kids 80's show Chiquilladas, which launched his career into the comedy world within Mexican television, theater, movies, among others.

His TV career includes several acclaimed TV shows, such as:Libre para amarte (2013), Pierre Notas (2008-2010), Parodiando (2012), La familia P. Luche (2002-2003), Pequeños Gigantes (2011), El Privilegio de Mandar (2005-2006), La Parodia (2004-2007), Chiquilladas, La Cuchufleta, La Vida en Risa, Atrévete a soñar (2009), and Al Fin de Semana (2001-2002).

Pierre Angelo has also formed part of commended theatrical shows, such as El Tenorio Cómico (2013), Don Juan Tenorio (Theater International Festival, Puebla, 2012). Being an author, producer and actor in the play Los 4 Jinetes del Apocalife and participating in Bicentenorio have also shown his interest in political satire and humor.

== Early life ==
Pierre Angelo was born and raised in Mexico City, Mexico along with his sister Gabriella Antonioli who is currently an industrial designer and entrepreneur. His mother, María Elena Flores (Mexican heritage) is the academic director of the Mercedes Institute and his father, Celestino Antonioli (Italian heritage) is an engineer and academic director at the Instituto Politécnico Nacional specialists of new technologies. The result of his marriage to Mexican actress, Marisol del Olmo, is his daughter, Isabella Antonioli (13).

Education being a crucial aspect of his life, Pierre has attended multiple schools and received several degrees. He first attended Universidad Intercontinental where he received a Bachelor in Communications. He later attended Universidad del Francés where he received his title in Marketing. Other schools he has attended are: Escuela Superior de Música (voice, piano, clarinet), Escuela Nacional de Música, and Marymount School, New York. He also attended multiple workshops to develop talents and knowledge in topics such as: improvisation, pantomime, jester, theater, and art of comedy, amongst others.

== Television ==
After being named part of the cast for Chiquilladas, Pierre Angelo became a household name within child stars in the Mexican community. With the show being aired in primetime by Televisa and available in countries, such as México, Guatemala, Costa Rica, Chile, Argentina, Venezuela, Colombia, Perú, and USA (Univisión and Galavisión), Angelo formed part of the show for 7 years.

At the age of 12, Angelo became part of another Televisa production with a children cast, which was also aired in multiple countries throughout Latin America, called La Carabina de Ambrosio. Upon becoming a young adult, he decided to take a break from television and work in theater. It wasn't until 1990, when he returned to TV as the host of the show "Súper Vacaciones,", that the show was finished, with 820 aired episodes, and in 1992, Angel vs. Angel came out as the first Sitcom Pierre would be part of. A year after, he was a part of the show "ÁNDALE!", where he was part of the actors selected for various sketches during this daily show. From 1994 to 2001, he participated in various TV shows such as La Vida en Risa, La Cuchufleta, Nosotros Somos Así, and Al Fin de Semana.

From 2002 to 2003 and 2006 to 2007, Angelo participated as part of the cast for La familia P. Luche, a show produced by Eugenio Derbez. It received two awards (2004 and 2008) as Best Comedy Show. Between both seasons of the series, he participated in the live show La parodia, which was transmitted in over 10 countries, and from 2005 to 2006 he was part of the acclaimed show El Privilegio de Mandar. Show that was based on a politic satire. Both of these shows won awards for Best Comedy Show as well, in 2006 (La Parodia) and 2007 (El Privilegio de Mandar).

In 2009, he took part in the telenovela Atrévete a soñar for 160 episodes, which was the first telenovela to ever air on Sunday. Pierre's talent to impersonate other characters with the help of makeup and FX effects was demonstrated from 2008 to 2010, when he appeared in the morning news show Primero Noticias, with Carlos Loret de Mola and his comedy/news section Pierre Notas which on a daily basis increased the ratings of the show.

In 2011 and 2012, Angelo was a judge in the reality shows Pequeños Gigantes and Parodiando. Pequeños Gigantes consisted of a talent competition among children, and Parodiando was a contest on parody performances.

In 2013, was part of the cast in the telenovela Libre para amarte with main actors Gloria Trevi, Gabriel Soto and Eduardo Santamarina. In 2015 and early 2016, he was in the telenovela La vecina with Esmeralda Pimentel, Juan Diego Covarrubias and Natalia Guerrero.

Currently, Pierre Angelo is part of the cast in the telenovela Enamorándome de Ramón alongside José Ron, Esmeralda Pimentel and Marisol del Olmo, among others.

== Theater ==
Year	Name of Play
2013	El Tenorio Cómico
2012	El Tenorio Cómico
2012	Los 4 Jinetes del Apocalife
2012	Bicentenorio
2012	Don Juan Tenorio
2004	Don Juan Tenorio
1997	Don Juan Tenorio
1996	Anita La Huerfanita
1996	Don Juan Tenorio
1995	Papito Querido
1994	La Divina Garza
1993	Homenaje a Cantinflas
1992	Don Juan Tenorio
1991	Oliver Twist (The Musical)

== Film ==
Year	Title	Role
2016	El Americano: The Movie	as El Mexicano (Animated)
2013	Seleción Canina	Voiceover (Animated)
2012	La Guía de Turistas	Example
2009	Nikté	as Chin (Animated)
2007	La Leyenda de la Nahuala	as Ciego (Animated)

== Awards ==
Year	Award		
	Mexican Association of Publicists at a Creative Level (AMAP - Spanish Initials)		
2007	TV y Novelas - Best Comedy Show - El privilegio de mandar		
2006	TV y Novelas - Best Comedy Show - La Parodia	1993	National Circle of Journalists - Juvenile Theater Revelation
1988	El Heraldo - Mexico Best Infantile Actor		
1987	TV y Novelas - Best Infantile Actor		

== Corporative experience ==
From 1994-2004 Pierre held the title of Creative Director of Special Events in OCESA-Grupo CIE and from 2006-2008 his title would be Creative Director and Annalist of Content for the production of shows of Grupo Televisa. During this time he managed important accounts for world known companies, amongst them: The Walt Disney Company, Xerox, CCM, Telmex, Microsoft, Roche, Nissan, Liverpool, Sabritas, HP, Bonafont, Aeroméxico, Beer Factory, Coca-Cola, Chrysler, Bristol, Marlboro, Editorial Armonia, Laboratorios Lily, Swiss Just, Mayan Resorts, VW, BDF, Comercial Mexicana, Organon, Sintex, etc.

In addition, as the founder and general director of Ingenio Contemporáneo S.C. from 2009-2013 he has managed accounts such as: American Express, General Motors, RCI, Gamesa, Roche, Toyota, Kraft Foods, Comex Group, Banamex, Apasco, Infonavit, Coca-Cola, Dell, Inbursa, Jafra, Mabe, Loreal, etc.
