= La liga de los 5 =

- Theatrical release poster
- Spanish: La liga de los 5
- Directed by: Marvick Núñez
- Written by: Acán Coen; Luis Antonio González Ávalos; David Israel; Andrew Foley
- Story by: Charbel Harp Calderoní; Ricardo González Duprat
- Produced by: José C. García de Letona; Fernando De Fuentes
- Starring: José Ángel Torres; Regina Blandón; Mariana Treviño; Mario Iván Martínez; César Filio
- Edited by: Rhen Fontaine
- Music by: Pablo Borghi
- Production company: Ánima
- Distributed by: Videocine
- Release date: January 10, 2020
- Running time: 89 minutes
- Country: Mexico
- Language: Spanish
- Budget: $0.9 million
- Box office: $0.2 million

La liga de los 5 (transl. The league of 5) is a 2020 Mexican animated superhero comedy film, produced by Ánima and directed by Marvick Núñez in his directorial debut. The film stars the Spanish voices of Regina Blandón and Mariana Treviño. The film is Mexico's first take on the'superhero' genre, in style of that of The Avengers, combined with traditional Latin American elements and legends.

The film was released in theaters in Mexico on January 10, 2020.

== Plot ==
Years ago, a team of superheroes known as the Liga de los 5 are on a mission to rescue Chema and Dolores, the team leaders' children, from Tin Marín. Chema and Dolores' mother decides to give in to complete a ritual Tin Marín was conducting, in exchange for her children. As their father and the rest of the team attempt to stop Tin Marín, the place collapses and kills Chema and Dolores' parents in the process.

In the present day, Chema, who has the ability to emanate capsaicin and turn his surroundings pungent, and Dolores, who can turn into a ghost —similarly as how her mother did— now live a civilian life with the team's gadgetman Tuerkas. After an inccident in which Dolores uses her powers gets uploaded to the internet, Tin Marín locates their house and kidnaps her. Tuerkas introduces Chema to the remaining Liga de los 5 team members: Catrina, a living skeleton who can manipulate bones and use them under her will; Tetlepanquetzal (or Tetle for short), an Aztec warrior who can turn into any animal he touches; and Tuna Guzmán, a lucha libre wrestler whose body can produce spines and cactus sap. Chema, Catrina, and Tetle go to recruit Tuna; as he gets into and argument with his employer, Tuerkas informs the team that Tin Marín is at the Museum of Anthropology getting his hands on a dagger needed for a ritual. Tin Marín steals it, but Tuna reveals he had replaced the original dagger with a decoy and kept the original one, although it got stolen from him before.

The team head to the Lagunilla market in hopes to find the dagger. Unbeknownst to them, Tin Marín tracks them down and retrieves the authentic dagger. Meanwhile, at Tin Marín's hideout, Dolores learns that Tin Marín wants to summon a supernatural entity known as Dr. Vampiro who could resurrect his daughter. The next day, Chema and Tuna find Tin Marín's hideout after Chema realizes he was given a flyer about a local fair earlier. After their sneak-in goes awry, Catrina and Tetle arrive in a modified bus and save both of them but the bus gets stuck in the underground. Tin Marín summons Dr. Vampiro but he is deceived by Dr. Vampiro as he does not resurrect his daughter as he had promised. The team escapes from the bus and Chema frees Dolores with the help of a redeemed Tin Marín, who sacrifices himself to liberate Dolores.

Dr. Vampiro gives sentience to various landmarks of Mexico City; including Tláloc's fountain, the Angel of Independence, the Cabeza de Juárez monument, and the Monument to the Revolution, to cause havoc in the city. Catrina, Tetle, and Tuna successfully stop them as Chema and Dolores join powers to defeat Dr. Vamprio, he is defeated and crushed by the Estela de Luz. The reunited Liga the los 5 are recognized as saviors of the city.

== Voice cast ==
- José Ángel Torres as Chema
- Regina Blandón as Dolores
- Mariana Treviño as La Catrina
- Mario Iván Martínez as Dr. Vampiro
- César Filio as La Tuna Guzmán

== Production ==
The film has been in development at Mexico City-based Ánima, which worked on such animated content as El Chavo Animado and the Leyendas franchise. Producer and company president, Fernando de Fuentes, stated that one of the film's goals was for it to push beyond the beliefs of the national limits of the superhero film category. He said that the film has been planned for a prolonged time. "What we want is to break the myth that there are only superheroes in other countries and show that you can have your own, very Mexican, everywhere and types," the producer said. "It is a project that we have been polishing for a long time to do it."

Marvick Núñez, the film's director, has faced the challenge of making the film's superhero effort, similar to the Marvel Cinematic Universe films, due to the fact that the genre has not been implemented in Mexico's film industry. Núñez wanted to introduce a "different world" based on life in Mexico, but also focus more on the characters' superpowers rather than the stereotypes. “There was a boom with Marvel and for years we have seen what happens with them[...]," said the director. "The instruction by the executive production was to make these Mexican characters[,] but also have comedy[.] [...T]he fun thing about doing this was that we did it as a team and we were all on the same channel.". This is the first feature project Núñez has worked on, and with Ánima Estudios. Prior to the film, he worked traditional animation projects in 1996 before studying at Escuela Nacional de Artes Plásticas (now Faculty of Arts and Design). He later founded the Terrícola Studio in 2004 where he worked as an art and animation director, as well as taking part in 2D and CG animation. During an interview with Proceso, he explains the goal to make the first superhero film of Mexico and said that "[...]we thought about our opportunity to include ourselves in this train, and from there the story and the characters took shape”. Núñez added that, "[t]he criterion was: what would the superheroes be like if they really existed here? What would be a Mexican power and give rise to comedy? That's why Chema has the power to enchilar, but he enchila himself, so it seems more than carrying a curse."

Regina Blandón, who voices Dolores, has explained the film's focused value of directing its superhero effort beyond Mexico's traditions. “It seems to me that much of the value of the film is precisely in that, that not only do the Avengers exist, but we see our culture reflected in superheroes where one of them has the power to "spice"[...]someone else. There is a catrina, an Aztec warrior and more. The intention is to rescue our traditions and make a film that goes beyond what we are used to," said Blandón.

=== Animation ===
The film uses the 2D tween ("flash") animation format with computer-generated backgrounds for certain sequences, making it the first original 2D feature production from Ánima outside of their Leyendas franchise since 2012.

=== Casting ===
Regina Blandón, voice of Dolores has expressed during an interview with El Sol de Mexico the complexity of her voice role, saying that "[...]it's a challenge, it's too complex[...] This particular project caught my attention for the opportunity to do dubbing.” As a fan of animation, Blandón said that she also faced the challenge of recording her character's lines as she must have a tone similar to a 15-year-old, which her character is aged. “I am almost 30 and I speak like José José,” Blandón said. “[T]he director asked me to do it more and [m]ore [acute]. It was about channeling my "chavita" voice and I think it was achieved; [i]t was a new experience and a great acting challenge.”

=== Music ===
Pablo Borghi has composed music for the film with an orchestral performance in Bratislava, Slovakia.

== Release ==
The film was released in theaters in Mexico on January 10, 2020. The film opened in 10th on its first weekend, grossing $4.6 million pesos (US$0.2 million).

The film was available for streaming in the United States through Pantaya.

=== Critical reception ===
The film received mostly favorable reviews. On Tomatazos, it has a "Fresh" score of 90% of positive critic reviews.

== Awards and nominations ==
Year	Award	Category	Nominees	Result
2021	63rd Ariel Awards	Mejor largometraje de animacion (Best Animation Feature)	Marvick Núñez	Nominated
2021	Quirino Awards	Best Ibero-American Animation Feature Film	Marvick Núñez	Nominated
