= Desafuero =

Spanish term for impeachment

The Spanish-language term desafuero refers to the process through which a government official's official immunity to criminal prosecution is removed, i.e., impeachment.

Strictly speaking the term is incorrect, as fuero (from Latin "forum") refers to the freedom of speech protection enjoyed by members of Congress, but since this protection is frequently confused with the immunity against criminal prosecution of top executive branch officials, the term is commonly used by the public in this latter sense.

== Notable desafueros ==
- Desafuero of AMLO

== See also ==
- Impeachment
- Parliamentary immunity
