= La leyenda del Charro Negro =

2018 Mexican animated film directed by Alberto Rodríguez

- Theatrical release poster
- Spanish: La leyenda del Charro Negro
- Literally: The Legend of Charro Negro
- Directed by: Alberto Rodríguez
- Written by: Alberto Rodríguez; David Israel
- Based on: Characters by Ricardo Arnaiz
- Produced by: Fernando de Fuentes; José C. García de Letona
- Starring: Benny Emmanuel; Eduardo España; Mayte Cordeiro; Erick Elías; Herman López; Emilio Treviño; Andrés Couturier; Annie Rojas; Óscar Flores
- Edited by: Alberto Rodríguez
- Music by: Leoncio Lara
- Production company: Ánima Estudios
- Distributed by: Videocine
- Release date: January 19, 2018
- Running time: 85 minutes
- Country: Mexico
- Language: Spanish
- Box office: MX$100.8 million US$5.3 million

Legend Quest: The Legend of the Black Charro (released in Latin America as La Leyenda del Charro Negro) is a 2018 Mexican 2D animated action-horror-comedy film, produced by Ánima Estudios.

The fifth installment of the Leyendas series of animated films and directed by Alberto Rodríguez, the film's story is focused on the "Charro Negro" historic figure, but also references story elements from the past installments.

The film was released in Mexico on 19 January 2018, opening to a commercial success. The film has grossed a total of $100.8 million pesos (est. US$5.3 million), making it the highest-grossing film in the Leyendas series. It is the final film in the series to be directed by Alberto Rodriguez.

The film was released in limited release in the United States on 23 March 2018, distributed by Pantelion Films and Tribe Releasing (under its Latin-themed label, Cinetlan).

== Plot ==
In an unknown location, the ghost girl Xochitl is taken hostage by a shadowed figure on a horse. She is pushed through a door by a one-eyed henchman. She attempts to defend herself, only to discover she has lost her ghostly powers. The henchman leaves her there and she is taken away by a mysterious creature with a mask.

Picking up from the events of Chupacabras, Leo and his brother Nando are returning home to Puebla. They run into a gypsy fortune-teller whose wagon has a broken wheel. Nando attempts to bargain with the gypsy for a ride to Puebla, but when she refuses, Leo offers her their help free of charge. The woman offers them free palm readings in gratitude, which only Leo accepts. The gypsy soon grows horrified: Leo's hand has two life lines, a long one that speaks of a bright future and a short, dark one that indicates Leo's involvement with the supernatural has left darkness in his soul. She warns him that if he ever walks the realms of the dead again, he will not come out, and vehemently advises him to run home to his family.

A disturbed Leo catches up to Nando, and talk between the two devolves into an argument over Leo leaving Nando and their grandmother in favor of adventures with his "imaginary friends" (so called because Nando can't see spirits, although he does believe they exist). The fight is interrupted by an old man who attempts to enlist their help in recovering his stolen deer's eye charm from a man called Rupertino. Despite Nando's misgivings about the story, Leo persuades him to help them. They find Rupertino, who really does make a living as a con man, in the caravan where he lives with his young daughter Beatriz. The two brothers are violently attacked by Beatriz while Rupertino denies stealing anything, but they manage to pickpocket Rupertino and flee with the charm. Rupertino and Beatriz discover the theft and give chase, catching up to the pair on a bridge where they have already returned the charm to the old man. The old man confronts Rupertino, who genuinely does not recognize him until the old man laughingly reminds him of an encounter they had twelve years ago. The man reveals himself to be El Charro Negro, a malignant spirit to whom Rupertino sold his soul: Rupertino has since been hiding from El Charro Negro to stop him from collecting the debt. Though Rupertino bravely offers him his soul, El Charro Negro takes Beatriz's soul instead.

As El Charro is about to return to the underworld, Leo proposes a bet in return of Beatriz. El Charro appears uninterested, but tells Leo he must visit El Charro in his home if he wants to go through before vanishing through a portal. As Leo and Nando argue over this new development and Rupertino also prepares to join them, the ghost Teodora appears to inform Nando that Finado and Moribunda have been desperately attempting to tell her something. Finado frightens Rupertino, who bolts towards the portal, and in the confusion all of them fall through. Beatriz, who is still alive but slowly fading, is left in the care of Ana; she reveals to Beatriz that her father didn't trade his soul for money. He had done business with El Charro Negro because Beatriz had gotten very sick as a baby and Rupertino had been afraid to lose her as he'd lost Beatriz's mother.

The group reappears in El Charro Negro's domain, a sprawling agave field dominated by a luxurious hacienda. Teodora realizes she has lost all her ghost powers and must resort to walking, which she has grown unaccustomed to after nearly six decades as a ghost. Unable to locate Finado and Moribunda, the group advances to El Charro Negro's house. He shows them Beatriz's soul being distilled - when the process concludes, the remnants of Beatriz's soul will leave her body and she will die.

Deep in El Charro Negro's home, the alebrije Evaristo is captured and confined to the same agave mill as Xochitl. Meanwhile, Leo's group agrees to a deal with El Charro Negro: they will venture through his personal fair to retrieve four special objects. If they can find all four before the rooster crows, he will return Beatriz her soul. Teodora and Nando find the Medallion of Miquiztli in the tent of a freak show attraction named the Caterpillar Woman, where they fail to answer her riddle ('what is something that is yours but that others use the most?') and are attacked until Teodora discovers the answer ('your name'). Rupertino and Leo make their way through a giant game of duck shooting towards a glowing crystal as Leo's old enemy Rousseau shoots at them. They are successful, but Leo begins to experience discomfort and discovers that the short black life line has begun extending tendrils down his arm. The group later reconvenes to a giant game of lotería, where they recover the Iyari medallion.

The group's final challenge is a fun house. However, they are barred from entering by El Charro Negro once Leo is inside, revealing he has walked into a trap. While all his friends convene outside the house and try to break in, Leo is confronted with a mirror that apparently holds an evil version of himself. He wakes up to El Charro Negro informing him that he has failed and the rooster has crowed; he then presents him with a bottle containing Beatriz's soul in a bottle. Back in the world of the living, Beatriz breathes her last in Ana's company. El Charro Negro refuses Leo's attempts at negotiating and reveals that he has singled out Leo to be his successor, pulling up his sleeve to show Leo his own black-veined arm. He then possesses Leo, forcing him to take on the mantle of El Charro Negro. The bottle containing Beatriz's soul falls and breaks.

Outside, Leo's friends are distraught when he emerges wearing El Charro Negro's clothes and wielding the spirit's vast powers. Nando manages to catch him off-guard, which allows Evaristo and Alebrije to fire Finado and Moribunda's pure energy into Leo. After a desperate few minutes, Leo's special powers are finally extracted and a furious Charro Negro abandons Leo's body and prepares to do battle with them in the shape of a shadowy black corpse. Though Leo doesn't want to leave his friends, the portal to the world of the living begins to close. After a parting kiss from Xochitl, Leo, Nando and Rupertino (who has scooped up as much of Beatriz's soul as he could into a gourd) leave for the mortal world. Xochitl, Teodora, Don Andrés, the alebrijes and the two skull children then launch a combined attack against El Charro Negro.

Back amongst the living, Rupertino returns to his caravan and pours the scant contents of the gourd into Beatriz's mouth. After a heartbreaking few minutes she finally returns to her father and Ana's joy. After saying their goodbyes, Nando and Leo hurry to Puebla.

Back in Puebla, they are greeted by many familiar sights, including the San Juan family bakery. Leo makes his way upstairs to find his grandmother awake in her bed. The two share a tearful reunion, after which they're joined by Nando and by Nana Dionisia, who comments on how grown-up Leo is. Although glad to be home, Leo is saddened at the loss of his friends.

Unbeknownst to the San Juan family, Leo's ghostly friends all crown around the bakery's window, having apparently defeated El Charro Negro. They too are sad that Leo can no longer see or hear them. Xochitl has an idea: she uses her powers to ring the bell that hangs outside the bakery and leaves a flower at the door. Leo goes outside at the sound. Unsure but trusting that his friends might hear him, Leo thanks them and tells them that their love and friendship will be with him always. He raises his hand, at which each of his friends touch back. It seems the touch somehow gets through to Leo, who thanks them with a smile. The ghosts reappear at the Villavicencio's abandoned casona in Puebla where they decide they will live from now on, as they consider Puebla their home too.

== Continuity Nods ==
- El Charro Negro's one-eyed henchman looks like Resendo, a former miner of Sir Gaspar's who died when he dove into Mictlantecuhtli's shrine to steal the spirit's offerings of jewelry.
- The monstrous sentient house where Sir Andrés and Alebrije are held resembles the monster house that the two defeated in the Doll Island in Xochimilco, during the search for La Llorona.
- A puppet resembling Papa Pickles, a puppet brought to life by La Llorona's tears and defeated by Sir Andrés and Alebrije, appears as an announcer to the Caterpillar Lady/ Madeline's enclosure.
- The showgirl who gives Leo and his friends the carnival ride tickets resembles Denise Rosseau, Gustave Rosseau's girlfriend.
- The man who shows Rupert and Leo to their ride resembles Santos, the candy salesman from Puebla who gave Leo the medallion that allowed the Nahuala to attempt a resurrection.
- Rousseau, the Frenchman who raised the dead of Guanajuato, shoots at Leo and Rupertino during the giant game of duck hunt Black Charro sends them to.
- The lotería's host resembles Mr. Lopez, one of la Nahuala's victims, who was cursed to roam the Villavicencio house as a living skeleton.
- The medallion that Nando and Teodora recover resembles the Medallion of Miquiztli, which Santos gave to Leo in order to lure him into the Villavicencio casona and become the Nahuala's victim.
- The crystal that Leo and Rupert recover resembles the white crystal that emerged from Leo himself when he was used by Gustave Rousseau to power Mictlantecuhtli's shrine in Guanajuato.
- The prize that the group acquires after beating the Lotería game resembles the Hiyari, the medallion that had been used to keep the Chupacabras' mate and offspring captive.

== Voice cast ==
- Benny Emmanuel as Leo San Juan
- Eduardo España as Evaristo
- Mayte Cordeiro as Teodora
- Erick Elías as Charro Negro
- Herman López as Alebrije
- Emilio Treviño as Fernando "Nando" San Juan
- Andrés Couturier as Don Andrés
- Annie Rojas as Xochitl
- Óscar Flores as Rupertino
- Andrea Arutti as Beatríz

== Production ==
Development of the film took place for two years and has wrapped in September 2017, with 300 filmmakers involved. The film was long rumored since the release of Momias in 2014, and has even been believed to be the next film after (Chupacabras was the true successor and released in 2016 before Charro Negro).

The "Charro Negro" figure was considered to be included in the franchise for a while. In an interview with Proceso, director Alberto Rodríguez said that the company Ánima Estudios has been working on the Leyendas films for 10–15 years, leading up to Charo Negro, with the same team of "different abilities". "[W]e have been working for ten years in these films, [and] we already understand each other very well. Our production structure is very solid, the artists understand the needs of the project," added Rodríguez.

For the "Charro Negro" figure, the filmmakers has considered including him in the franchise for a while. Rodríguez called the figure a "very powerful and seductive character", making the character "dangerous". "It's interesting how Leo San Juan, our main character, is going to deal with this dark and powerful force," said Rodríguez. The filmmakers wanted to give the figure a more 'Mexican' taste to match the national cinema's 'golden age' by giving him an attractive personality and arming him with golden spurs. "It's a historical character," said Rodríguez. "We have it in the psyche of the Mexican. We have it very present. [..]It is these people who exploit the needy, and I believe that the Mexican people have suffered a lot from that, from people who are constantly oppressing them."

Alberto Rodríguez, who has also co-written the past installments (excluding Nahuala), has penned the script and story with David Israel. "It was what I wanted to tell and we hired David Israel to write the script for us," Rodríguez said. "At the beginning[,] it was a lot of anguish when creating these feature films, now I have a lot of fun."

In order to meet the fans' expectations, the past installments' characters, such as Don Andrés, were brought back for the film, and features references and cameos from the previous films.

=== Animation ===
The film is animated in flash animation. Director Alberto Rodríguez stated that the process was "difficult", calling it a "complex process". "Animation is a very complex process that requires too much knowledge, not only at the level of the animators but at the level of the production structure," he said.

=== Casting ===
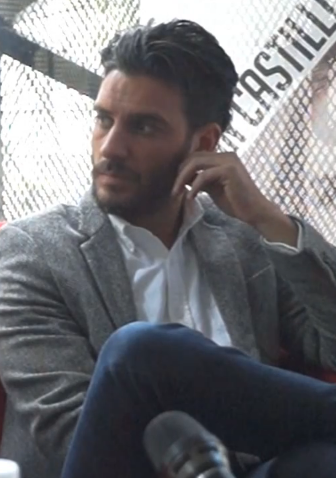
Despite difficulties in developing the voice for Charro Negro, Erick Elías has expressed his satisfaction in working in the animated film.

As the previous installments' current voice cast reprise their respective roles, among the newcomers is Erick Elías as the voice of Charro Negro. Elías shared his experience on working in the film, stating that he's satisfied with the work, despite some difficulties in developing a matching tone for the character. "[I]t is a pride that I have been invited to be part of this [made] by Mexicans, for Mexicans[.] I feel identified with everything that happens with this Leyenda," he said. "I faced great difficulties because I had to give him that personality only with his voice," he said. "We had an arduous table job with the director, finding the "norteño" tone with that serious accent. To achieve it was a very fun and complicated process, but in the end I liked the experience." Elías had previous voice-acting experience prior to Charro Negro, including that of the Spanish-dubbing versions of Cloudy with a Chance of Meatballs and its sequel both produced by Sony Pictures Animation. Elías said his voice work experience in Charro Negro is "different" from his dubbing roles Meatballs films. "It was very different for me," he said. "[I]t's completely different from what I had done in dubbing, [which is] another process, because here I was given the freedom to create this [C]harro and I'm happy, I think it's going to be fine." Elías also stated that the film has made him 'happy' since his work in an animated production has helped him reunite with his family. "I was flattering that they called me for this, [and] I really like that my daughters are part of something I do[;] not many times I can bring them to the movies and this can be seen," he said at the premiere at the Cinépolis Oasis Coyoacán theater.

Alberto Rodríguez said he was also satisfied and shared the same difficult but satisfying experience with working with Elías. "We looked for a lot of people, but he gave us that malice that we wanted to impregnate the character because [he] is evil, [and] is possessing the manipulative tone as a particular smirk that gives an ideal scorn to act. We found the balance to be very bad and very nice at the same time," said the director.

== Release ==
The film was released theatrically in Mexico on 19 January 2018, unlike past installments which were released on an October. It was originally planned for release in December 2017.

=== Box office ===
On its opening weekend in Mexico, the film opened at #3 behind The Commuter and The Shape of Water, earning at least $29 million pesos (approx. $1.6 million USD). The film moved up to #2 behind Guillermo del Toro's The Shape of Water, earning at least $24 million pesos (approx. US$1.3 million) and grossing a total of $63.4 million pesos (est. US$3.4 million). On its third week, the film moved back down to the #3 rank grossing $12.29 million pesos ($0.6. million USD), bringing a total $82.39 million pesos (est. US$4.4 million) with a total of 1.9 million viewers. To date the film earned a total of $100.8 million pesos.

=== U.S. release ===
The film has received a limited theatrical release in the United States on 23 March 2018, distributed by Pantelion Films and Tribe Releasing. Eduardo España, the voice of Evaristo, said that he was "very happy" about the film's U.S. effort due to the empathy of the Hispanic viewers, and said that "values and roots are reinforced with humor and endearing stories."

== Awards and nominations ==
Year	Award	Category	Nominees	Result
2018	15th Premios Canacine	Mejor Película de Animación (Best Animated Film)	La leyenda del Charro Negro	Nominated
2019	61st Ariel Awards	Mejor largometraje animado (Best Feature Animation)	Alberto “Chino” Rodríguez	Nominated

== Follow-ups ==
A prequel, focused on Finado and Moribunda, was released on Vix on 10 August 2022.

A seventh installment, La leyenda de los Chaneques, was released on 14 July 2023 on Vix.

== See also ==
- La Leyenda de la Nahuala
- La Leyenda de la Llorona
- La Leyenda de las Momias
- La Leyenda del Chupacabras
- Legend Quest (2017 TV series)
- Ánima Estudios
