= La leyenda de las Momias =

- Film poster
- Directed by: Alberto Rodríguez
- Written by: Ricardo Arnaiz; Jesús Guzmán; Alberto Rodríguez; Dulce María Belchez Guerrero
- Based on: Characters by Ricardo Arnaiz
- Produced by: José C. García de Letona; Fernando de Fuentes S.
- Starring: Benny Emmanuel; Andrés Couturier; Mayté Cordero; Rafael Inclán; Eduardo España; Ale Müller
- Edited by: Roberto Bolado
- Music by: Leoncio Lara
- Production company: Ánima Estudios
- Distributed by: Videocine
- Release date: October 30, 2014
- Running time: 83 minutes
- Country: Mexico
- Language: Spanish
- Budget: $1.3 million
- Box office: MX$92.25 million (US$6.3 million)

La leyenda de las Momias, also known as The Legend of the Mummies of Guanajuato, is a 2014 Mexican animated horror adventure comedy film co-written and directed by Alberto Rodríguez, produced by Ánima Estudios and distributed by Videocine.

The third installment of the Leyendas film saga, following Nahuala and Llorona, the story is a fictional take on the origin of the mummies, mainly those of the Guanajuato origin. The film features the voices of Benny Emmanuel, Eduardo "Lalo" España, Mayté Cordero, Rafael Inclán, Andrés Cuturier, and Ale Müller.

It was released in theaters and in 4DX on October 30, 2014, in Mexico, becoming the first Mexican film to be released in the format.

The film was released on digital platforms in the United States through Vix.

== Plot ==
The story opens in the town of Guanajuato in the year 1810, two years after the events of la Nahuala. Strict but kindly foreman Don Gaspar leads a crew of miners in a newly excavated silver mine, where they are close to reaching the silver deposit. The miners discover a sinister shrine, prompting Gaspar to call company owner Gustav Rousseau: the Frenchman seems unsurprised at the discovery and orders the mine closed despite Gaspar's objections about how badly his men need the jobs. That night, despite his young daughter Valentina's misgivings, Gaspar and the miner Rosendo decide to speak to Rousseau and demand the mine's reopening.

Gaspar and Rosendo witness Rousseau taking a human-shaped bundle down into the mines. They follow him to the shrine discovered earlier in the day, where Rousseau sets up two crystals and initiates a ritual that will allow his fiancé Denise (who he says was taken from him by a disease) to return to life. Greed overpowers Rosendo's caution and leads him to jump into the shrine mid-ritual, intent on stealing the god Mictlantecuhtli's offerings of jewelry. The sacrilege angers the god, who makes Rosendo vanish. Gaspar seizes the opportunity to steal one of the crystals and disrupt the ritual, as he believes the dead should not be returned. He manages to hide the crystal before a furious Rousseau catches up to him. Rousseau performs a temporary life-draining spell upon Gaspar and abandons him beside a pile of lit explosives. Gaspar's last thoughts are for his daughter, Valentina. Back on the surface the explosion draws the miners and the gendarmes, who assume Gaspar has turned rogue and set the explosion on purpose.

Later, Leo San Juan's group is seen fleeing from mummified corpses through the deserted streets of Guanajuato. They are saved by a robed boy who claims to be "Luis", who tells them to take refuge in the market. There, the locals are wary of the group for being outsiders while a shadowy figure stalks Leo. He runs into Luis again and together they attempts to save a woman from mummies, after which the boy reluctantly agrees to team up with Leo. They realize that the mummies are harmless, intent on getting back to the lives they lived (an old teacher lumbers back to school and performs roll call, a father returns home to his family). Back at the market, Don Andrés falls for Gloria, a woman who owns a stand of love spells. While to Don Andrés she looks very beautiful, Gloria is in fact quite homely. Alebrije meets another alebrije named Evaristo, who claims he can help them find Xochitl. The group becomes involved in a brawl when Alebrije calls Gloria ugly in front of her father, and the gendarmes takes them to the local judge for disturbing the peace and stealing three tangerines. The judge orders them put in a holding cell.

Gloria visits Don Andrés in the holding cell. When he still considers her beautiful after Alebrije removes the 'magic' bracelet, her father becomes convinced of his sincerity and takes them to meet a powerful wizard who can tell them what has happened. The powerful wizard turns out to be Gloria's father. When he drinks, he turns into an old and powerful alebrije wizard named Sulik. Sulik tells them that Xochitl is being held captive in the mines by Rousseau, who used her as bait to lure his true intended victim: Leo. As a soul tempered by encounters with the supernatural, Leo is the sacrifice Rousseau needs to return his fiancé to life. After Gloria's father turns back into a human, he drops charges against the group and allows them to go free (but only once the judge marries Gloria and Don Andrés).

Out on the streets, Luis and Leo run into the mummies of twelve convicts who died in a fire and were left unclaimed: unlike the other mummies, these are hell bent on harm and destruction. Luis's hood gets ripped off during the fight, revealing 'he' is in fact Valentina. She decided to hide her identity to escape the gendarmes and clear her father's name. They make it to the mines, where they are captured by Rousseau and taken back to the shrine. Despite an intervention from an undead Gaspar and the timely arrival of Teodora and the rest, Rousseau takes Valentina hostage and forces Leo enter the shrine. With Leo's soul as the conduit, Denise returns to life. Though Denise is glad to see Rousseau, she quickly realizes the havoc he has caused and insists that the dead have no place among the living. Despite Rousseau's selfish insistences, Denise vanishes. When a distraught Rousseau dives into Mictlantecuhtli's shrine after her, the angered god takes his life. Xochitl releases Leo from the shrine.

The undead Gaspar reappears, carrying the toy raccoon that Valentina used to send with the basket when she lowered supplies into the mine. He also gives her a note where he promises he'll be with her in her heart and memories, then hands her the altar's missing stone. Leo uses the stone to close the portal: the loosed mummies briefly return to their human form before returning to the afterlife.

With the natural order of life restored, Valentina is taken to her aunt and uncle in Morelia. The newly married Don Andrés and Alebrije decide they will stay in Guanajuato, while Leo announces it is time for him to return home to his grandmother in Puebla. Friar Godofredo appears to tell the group they have one last mission: to participate in the party that Gloria has organized for them. They are later seen seeing Leo off as he rides away in a cart. A post-credits seen shows Leo waking up alone in the cart, where he backs into a black-clad stranger with red eyes who claims he has been waiting for him.

== Cast ==
- Benny Emmanuel as Leo San Juan
- Andrés Couturier as Don Andrés and Rosseau
- Mayté Cordero as Teodora
- Rafael Inclán as Alebrije
- Eduardo España as Evaristo
- Ale Müller as Valentina-Luis

== Development ==
The development of the film took place for three years with the work of 200 people. The film was produced without the support of the Mexican government, due to not being approved, and the filmmakers had to rely on the support of the state government of Guanajuato, according to producer and Ánima CEO Fernando de Fuentes. "We were not approved at the time..., but we have the support of Guanajuato, who gave us something. Ánima Estudios had to invest in this much more than in other films, but undoubtedly the stimuli were important to reach [with] what we do today."

Director Alberto Rodríguez detailed the challenges of the development course of the film, mainly focused on recapturing the spirit of the saga's characters and shaping up the franchise. "There were many challenges, a lot of effort and we believe that we are a benchmark in animation and we were forced to break our own standards, as it is difficult to maintain the characters and give them an arc of action for three installments, but we did it," said Rodríguez. "The movies and characters are already owned by Ánima Estudios and it has been very difficult, because creating a franchise in a country used to receiving them and not creating them is complicated, but we knew we had to do it," said Fernando de Fuentes.

The film's production was doubted since it took place during the time of the Mexican cinema's decline. "[...]it was a time when everyone was fleeing from the national cinema. But everything has changed and today people see Mexican cinema, because it makes very good products and that is what we want to continue doing," said Fernando de Fuentes. Benny Emmanuel, who plays the protagonist Leo San Juan, also shared his experience, saying that it is his first, not only being in the franchise, but also his first animation role. "[It was...] the first time I participated in this saga[,] and actually this is [my] first thing in dubbing[,] and playing 'Leo' was very nice and the director helped me a lot but it was very funny," said Emmanuel.

=== Casting ===
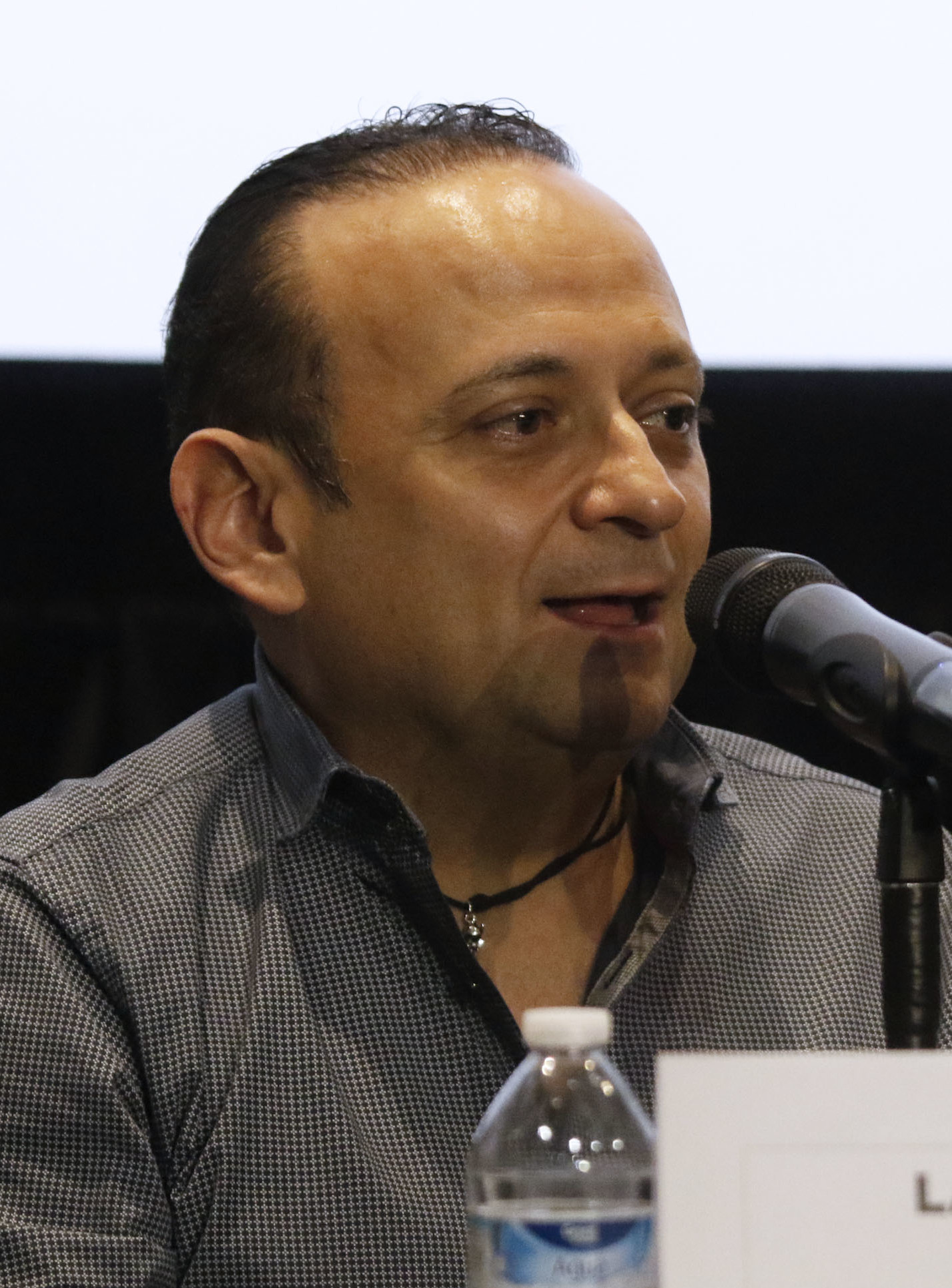
Eduardo España (pictured in 2019) voiced Evaristo, would later reprise his role in succeeding entries.

The film features the voices of famous Mexican talents, such as Benny Emmanuel (known for his role in La CQ), Alejandra Muller (also from La CQ), and Eduardo España. While the development course was very challenging to the filmmakers, Rodríguez stated that he was very happy working with the actors involved. Eduardo España, who plays Evaristo, shared his story of working in the film. "I always believe in the actor-director communication and there has to be willingness and openness, but we did very good chemistry with 'El Chino' (director Alberto's nickname) because it gives you a very fatherly negotiation in addition to taking into account [of] good taste and fun[,] and let[s] you flow," he said.

=== Animation and Redesign ===
The film was produced with flash animation, Animated by Ánima Estudios in Mexico with additional animation by Top Draw Animation in Manila, Philippines, Copernicus Studios in Canada and Feitong Cartoon Graphics Services in Shanghai, China, this marks Ánima Estudios' first feature-length animated film to include additional animation by a Chinese animation studio.

The difference for The Legend of Crywoman, the Film was the updated animation style, which now features a more stylized and modern aesthetic redesign and artistic style in the visuals and character appearances.

== Release ==
The film was released theatrically in theaters and the motion-enhanced 4DX format on 30 October 2014 in Mexico at around 1,000 locations nationwide.

It later had its United States premiere at The 22nd Annual San Diego Latino Film Festival on 15 March 2015. It was also shown at the Regal Cinemas L.A. Live Stadium 14 theater on 9 May 2015, as part of the 2015 Hola Mexico Film Festival.

The film later had its official U.S. premiere only on digital platforms, through Pantaya. It was released in its original Spanish-language format with no English subtitles.

=== Box office ===
The film opened at No. 2 at the domestic box-office, behind Annabelle, earning $35.6 million pesos ($2.6 million USD) on its opening weekend. On its second weekend, it remained on the #2 spot, behind Interstellar, earning an additional $23.7 million pesos ($1.75 million USD). It grossed a total of $92.25 million pesos.

=== Reception ===
This film received some mixed-to-negative reviews. Eric Ortiz Garcia, of Twitch Film, said that the film was an "OK production", but criticized the animation too, saying that "it's not the best, sure." However, he heavily criticized the film's writing.

== Sequel ==
The fourth installment of the Leyendas franchise, titled La Leyenda del Chupacabras, was released in the United States on October 14, 2016, followed by a Mexico release on October 21, 2016.

It was later followed by La leyenda del Charro Negro, released on 19 January 2018.

== See also ==
- Mummies of Guanajuato
- Ánima Estudios
- La Leyenda de la Nahuala
- La Leyenda de la Llorona
- La Leyenda del Chupacabras
- La Leyenda del Charro Negro
- Legend Quest (2017 TV series)
