= Eduardo España =

Mexican actor and comedian (born 1971)

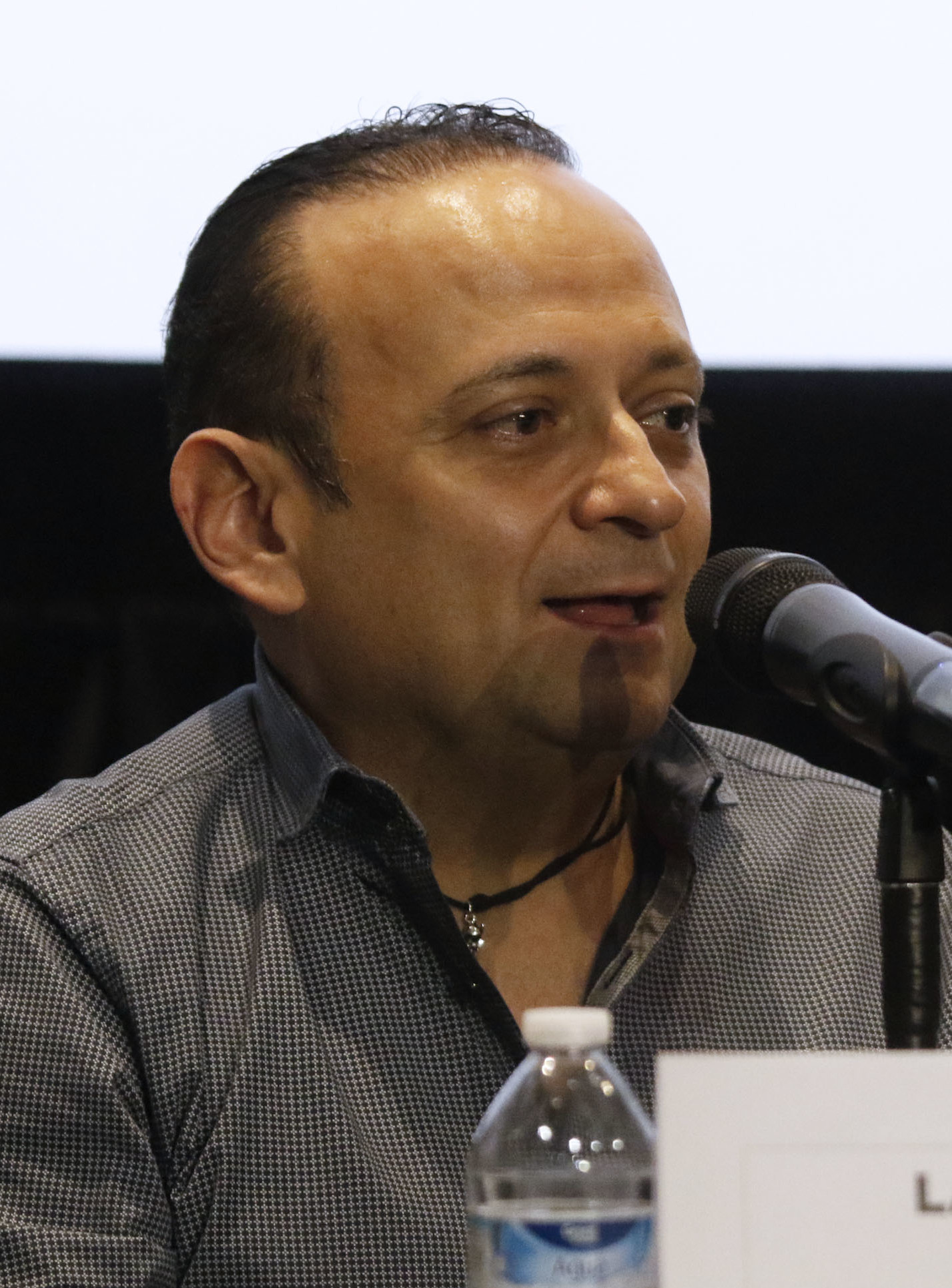
- España in 2019
- Born: Eduardo Ramírez Velázquez; 15 September 1971 (age 54); Guadalajara, Jalisco, Mexico
- Other name: Lalo España
- Occupations: Actor; comedian; producer
- Years active: 1993–present

Eduardo Ramírez Velázquez (born 15 September 1971), known professionally as Eduardo "Lalo" España, is a Mexican telenovela, stage and film actor, and comedian. He is best known for his character Márgara Francisca, his role as Germán Martínez in the television series Vecinos, voicing Evaristo in the Leyendas film series and being a former member of Otro Rollo.

== Filmography ==
=== Film ===
Year	Title	Roles	Notes
2002	Asesino en serio	Benito	
2004	Puños rosas	Judicial 2	
2004	Santos peregrinos	Pando	
2004	La mesa servida		Short film
2005	Una de balazos	El Chaparro	Short film Direct-to-video
2006	Cansada de besar sapos	Don Chuy	
2007	Señas particulares	Osvaldo	Short film
2008	Llamando a un ángel	Milton	Also associate producer
2008	Planta baja	Raúl	Short film
2008	Amor letra por letra	Bank manager	
2009	Crónicas chilangas	Dr. Archundia	
2009	Ausencia	Timoteo Domingo	
2011	Pastorela	Compadre Vulmaro Villafuerte	
2011	Galeana No. 8	Actor #1	Short film
2012	Fecha de Caducidad	Osvaldo	
2012	Hecho en China	George	
2012	Amante de lo ajeno	Leonardo	
2013	Tercera llamada	Poquemón	
2014	Cantinflas	Alejandro Galindo	
2014	La leyenda de las Momias de Guanajuato	Evaristo	Voice role
2015	Por mis bigotes	Dagoberto	
2016	Sensato Delirio	Manso	Short film
2016	12 Rounds	Felix	
2016	La leyenda del Chupacabras	Evaristo / Merolick	Voice roles
2017	Como matar a un esposo muerto	Fernando	
2017	Cuando los hijos regresan	Mudancero	
2018	La leyenda del Charro Negro	Evaristo	Voice role
2018	Morir de amor	Alejandro	
2018	Todo mal	Patricks	
2018	Le vas a decir?	Doctor	Short film
2021	El poderoso Victoria	Telegrafist	
2022	Las leyendas: el origen	Evaristo	Voice role
2022	Águila y Jaguar: los guerreros legendarios	Dr. Exper	Voice role
2022	Amor es amor	Carlos	
2023	La leyenda de los Chaneques	Evaristo	Voice role

=== Television ===
Year	Title	Roles	Notes
1993	Al derecho y al Derbez		Episode #3
1995-1996	El premio mayor		
1996-1997	Tú y yo	Albanil	
1996-2006	Otro Rollo	Various	
1998	La Güereja y algo más	Francisco Navarrete	
1998	Mujer, Casos de la Vida Real		2 episodes
2001	Diseñador ambos sexos	Pierre	
2002	Gran Carnal: Los fenómenos	Ricky Martin es	
2002	El gran carnal 2	Doña Márgara Francisca	
2004	Hospital el paisa	Márgara Francisca / Armando Maradona	2 episodes
2004-2006	El Privilegio de Mandar	Lord Molécula / Doña Márgara	
2005–present	Vecinos	Germán Martínez	Lead role
2006	¿Y ahora qué hago?	Himself	Episode: "Mi nuevo amigo"
2009	Los simuladores	Pedro	Episode: "Amor de madre"
2009	Plaza Sésamo	Mesero	Episode: 12.20
2010-2011	Para volver a amar	Quintín	Recurring role
2012	Adictos		Episode: "Adictos al Dinero"
2012	La familia P. Luche	Various	
2012	La Clinica	Payaso Nenuco	Recurring role
2012	Cachito de cielo	Ariel	Recurring role
2013	Todo incluido	Don Cipriano 'El gerente' / Doña Márgara Francisca	
2014	El color de la pasión	Lalo	Secondary role
2016	El hotel de los secretos	Dagoberto Suárez	Main role
2018–present	La parodia	Various	
2020	Ana	Manager	Recurring role: season 1
2020	La parodia a domicilio	Various	
2022	La Madrastra	Rufino González 'El Tortuga'	Recurring role
2022–2023	Tal para cual	Márgara Francisca Tommy Camote	Episode: "Corazón de vecindad" Episode: "El Hipnotista"
2025	Riquísimos, por cierto	Germán Martínez	Main role

== Personal life ==
España is openly gay.
