= Animex Producciones =

Mexican animation studio

Animex
- Company type: Private
- Genre: Animation; Motion pictures
- Founded: 2000
- Founder: Ricardo Arnaiz
- Headquarters: Puebla, Mexico
- Website: www.animexestudios.com

Animex Producciones is a Mexican animation studio, established in Puebla, which specializes in digital animation productions for film and television. It was founded in 2000 by Ricardo Arnaiz. The studio utilizes the Toon Boom Animation software for 2D productions.

== Films ==
- La Leyenda de la Nahuala (2007)
- Nikté (2009)
- La Revolución de Juan Escopeta (2011)
- Selección Canina (2015)
- El Americano: The Movie (2016) - co-production with Phil Roman Entertainment and Olmos Productions
- Héroes (2023)
- Neri Vela: Espacio sin Límites (2025)
- Canas al Aire (TBA)
- Maya. La Primera Gran Historia (Cancelled)
