= List of Mexican animated films =

This is a list of animated films in Mexico. Below also lists the twelve highest-grossing animated films within the Mexican film industry.

== List ==
=== 1970s ===
Year	Title International title	Director(s)	Technique	Note(s) / Ref(s)
1976	Los tres Reyes Magos; The Three Wise Men	Fernando Ruiz; Adolfo Torres Portillo	Traditional animation	First feature animated film produced in Mexico; based on the Gospel of Matthew story.
1978	Los supersabios	Anuar Badin	Traditional animation	Based on the Los supersabios comic series created Germán Butze.

=== 1980s ===
Year	Title International title	Director(s)	Technique	Note(s)
1981	El gran acontecimiento	Fernando Ruiz	Traditional animation	An adaptation of the apparition of Virgin of Guadalupe, Medium film.
1982	Crónicas del Caribe	Francisco López; Emilio Watanabe	Traditional animation	Medium film.
1983	Roy del espacio	Héctor López Carmona; Rafael Ángel Gil; Ulises Pérez Aguirre	Traditional animation	A previously lost film, the negatives were discovered in 2021 and is set to be released on Blu Ray by Deaf Crocodiles.
1984	Katy la oruga Katy Caterpillar	José Luis Moro; Santiago Moro	Traditional animation	Based on Pepina Oruga, a book by Silvia Roche
1987	El pequeño ladronzuelo The Adventures of Oliver Twist	Fernando Ruiz	Traditional animation	Based on Charles Dickens' Oliver Twist.
1988	Katy, Kiki y Koko; Katy and the Katerpillar Kids A.K.A Katy Meets the Aliens	José Luis Moro; Santiago Moro	Traditional animation	Sequel to Katy la Oruga; final Mexican animated feature film before hiatus.

=== 1990s ===
Year	Title International title	Director(s)	Technique	Note(s)
1997	Cuauhtli: Historias de un Pueblo	Fernando Ruiz	Traditional animation	Medium Film.

=== 2000s ===
Year	Title International title	Director(s)	Technique	Note(s)
2003	Magos y Gigantes; Wizards and Giants	Andrés Couturier; Eduardo Sprowls	Flash animation	First Mexican animated film since 1988.
2005	Imaginum	Alberto Mar; Isaac Sandoval	Flash animation	
2006	Una Película de Huevos; A Movie of Eggs	Gabriel Riva Palacio Alatriste; Rodolfo Riva Palacio Alatriste	Traditional animation	First film in the Huevos film series.
2007	La leyenda de la Nahuala; The Legend of the Nahuala	Ricardo Arnaiz	Flash/Traditional animation	First film in the Leyendas film saga. Inspired by the nagual story.
2009	El Agente 00-P2; Agent Macaw: Shaken and Stirred	Andrés Couturier	Flash animation	
2009	Otra Película de Huevos y un Pollo; Another Eggs and A Chicken Movie	Gabriel Riva Palacio Alatriste; Rodolfo Riva Palacio Alatriste	Traditional animation	Second film in the Huevos film series.
2009	A Martian Christmas	José Alejandro García Muñoz	Traditional animation	Based on the poem, "A Martian Christmas Carol" by M.H. Mickey Miller. TV Movie
2009	Nikté	Ricardo Arnaiz	Flash/Traditional animation	Final animated release of the 2000s

=== 2010s ===
Year	Title International title	Director(s)	Technique	Note(s)
2010	AAA – Sin Límite en el Tiempo; AAA the Movie	Alberto Rodríguez	Flash/CG animation	First animated release of the 2010s
2010	Kung-Fu Magoo	Andrés Couturier	Flash animation	Based on the Mr. Magoo character created by Millard Kaufman and John Hubley. DVD Movie
2010	Gaturro	Gustavo Cova	CG animation	Based on the Argentine comic book series of the same name. DVD release in México
2010	Brijes; Guardians of the Lost Code	Benito Fernández	Traditional animation	
2010	Héroes verdaderos Heroes	Carlos Kuri	Traditional animation	Animated biopic of Miguel Hidalgo y Costilla, José María Morelos, Ignacio Allende and Juan Aldama.
2011	Don gato y su pandilla Top Cat: The Movie	Alberto Mar	Flash/CG animation	Based on the Top Cat animated series created by William Hanna and Joseph Barbera.
2011	El gran milagro The Greatest Miracle	Bruce Morris	CG animation	First Mexican animated film in CG animation
2011	La leyenda de la Llorona; The Legend of the Crying Woman	Alberto Rodríguez	Flash animation	Second film in the Leyendas film saga; inspired by the La Llorona story.
2011	La revolución de Juan Escopeta; The Revolution of Juan Escopeta	Jorge A. Estrada	Traditional animation	
2012	Z-Baw: Mejores amigos Z-Baw	Ricardo Gomez	CG animation	
2012	El Santos vs. La Tetona Mendoza; The Wild Adventures of El Santos	Alejandro Lozano	Flash/Traditional animation	Based on the adult comic book series by José Ignacio Solórzano and José Trinidad Camacho. First Mexican adult animated movie
2013	El Secreto del Medallón de Jade; The Secret of the Jade Medallion	Leopoldo Aguilar; Rodolfo Guzmán	CG animation	
2014	Jungle Shuffle	Taedong Park; Mauricio De la Orta	CG animation	Unreleased in Mexico
2014	La leyenda de las Momias de Guanajuato; The Legend of the Mummies	Alberto Rodríguez	Flash animation	Third film in the Leyendas saga; inspired by the Mummies of Guanajuato.
2015	Guardianes de Oz; Guardians of Oz A.K.A Wicked Flying Monkeys	Alberto Mar	CG animation	Based on the characters from The Wizard of Oz by L. Frank Baum.
2015	La increíble historia del niño de piedra The Incredible Story of The Stone Boy	Pablo Aldrete; Miguel Bonilla Schnaas; Jaime Romandia; Miguel Ángel Uriegas	Flash animation	Based on the original idea by Nadia González, and the children's book.
2015	Selección Canina; K-9 World Cup	Carlos Pimentel; Nathan Sifuentes	CG animation	
2015	Las aventuras de Itzel y Sonia; The Adventures of Itzel and Sonia	Fernanda Rivero	Stop Motion	Anthology film.
2015	Un gallo con muchos huevos Huevos: Little Rooster's Egg-cellent Adventure	Gabriel Riva Palacio Alatriste; Rodolfo Riva Palacio Alatriste	CG animation	Third film in the Huevos film series; highest-grossing Mexican animated film of all time.
2015	Don Gato: el inicio de la pandilla Top Cat Begins	Andrés Couturier	CG animation	Based on the Top Cat series by Hanna-Barbera. Prequel Film
2016	El Americano: The Movie; Americano	Ricardo Arnaiz; Mike Kunkel	CG animation	
2016	La leyenda del Chupacabras; The Legend of the Chupacabras	Alberto Rodríguez	Traditional animation	Fourth film in the Leyendas film saga; inspired by the "chupacabra" creature.
2017	Isla Calaca; Monster Island	Leopoldo Aguilar	CG animation	
2018	La leyenda del Charro Negro; The Legend of the Black Charro	Alberto Rodríguez	Flash animation	Fifth film in the Leyendas film saga; inspired by the "Charro Negro" figure.
2018	Marcianos vs. Mexicanos; Martians vs. Mexicans	Gabriel Riva Palacio Alatriste; Rodolfo Riva Palacio Alatriste	Flash/Traditional animation	Second Mexican adult animated movie.
2018	The Angel in the Clock; El Ángel en el Reloj	Miguel Ángel Uriegas	Flash/Traditional animation	
2018	Ahí Viene Cascarrabias; Here Comes the Grump Movie A.K.A A Wizard's Tale	Andrés Couturier	CG animation	Based on the Here Comes the Grump animated series created by DePatie–Freleng Enterprises.
2018	Ana y Bruno; Ana & Bruno	Carlos Carrera	CG animation	Based on the novel, "Ana" by Daniel Emil.
2019	Dia de Muertos; The Big Wish A.K.A Salma's Big Wish	Carlos Gutiérrez Medrano	CG animation	Final animated release of the 2010s

=== 2020s ===
Year	Title International title	Director(s)	Technique	Note(s)
2020	La liga de los 5 The League of 5	Marvick Núñez	Flash animation	First animated release of the 2020s.
2020	Cranston Academy: Monster Zone; Escuela de Miedo	Leopoldo Aguilar	CG animation	
2020	Un disfraz para Nicolás; A Costume for Nicolás	Eduardo Rivero	Flash/Traditional animation	Based on the Jaime Mijares children's book.
2020	El camino de Xico; Xico's Journey	Eric Cabello	Flash/CG animation	
2021	Un rescate de huevitos Little Eggs: An African Rescue	Gabriel Riva Palacio Alatriste; Rodolfo Riva Palacio Alatriste	CG animation	Originally planned for 2019; Fourth film in the Huevos film series.
2021	Koati	Rodrigo Perez-Castro	Traditional animation	Streaming release in México by Blim TV.
2021	Catalina la Catrina: Especial Día de Muertos; Catalina the Catrina: Day of the Dead Special	Edino Israel	Flash animation	TV special, released in Canal 5 and Blim TV.
2022	Las leyendas: el origen The Legends Origin	Ricardo Arnaiz	Flash animation	Prequel film; Sixth film in the Leyendas film saga, Streaming release by Vix.
2022	Águila y Jaguar: Los Guerreros Legendarios; Eagle and Jaguar: The Legendary Warriors	Mike R. Ortiz	CG animation	
2022	Pinocho de Guillermo del Toro; Guillermo del Toro's Pinocchio	Guillermo del Toro; Mark Gustafson	Stop Motion	Streaming release by Netflix, animated in Zapopan, Jalisco and in Portland, Oregon; First American-Mexican stop motion animated film. Based on Pinocchio story by Carlo Collodi.
2022	Huevitos congelados Little Eggs: A Frozen Rescue	Gabriel Riva Palacio Alatriste; Rodolfo Riva Palacio Alatriste	CG animation	Fifth film in the Huevos film series; Streaming release by Vix.
2023	Home Is Somewhere Else; Mi Casa Está en Otra Parte	Carlos Hagerman; Jorge Villalobos	Flash/Traditional animation	First Mexican Animated documentary. Third Mexican adult animated movie.
2023	La leyenda de los Chaneques; The Legend of the Chaneques	Marvick Núñez	Flash animation	Seventh film in Las Leyendas franchise; inspired on the Chaneque mythological creature; Streaming release by Vix.
2023	Max; Max & Me	Donovan Cook	CG animation	Animated biopic of Maximilian Kolbe. Fourth Mexican adult animated movie and First Mexican adult CG animated movie.
2023	Un Reino para Todos Nosotros; A Kingdom for Us All	Miguel Ángel Uriegas	Flash animation	First co-production with Colombia; Limited theatrical release.
2024	Uma y Haggen: Princesa y Vikingo; Uma & Haggen	Benito Fernández	Traditional animation	
2024	La familia del barrio: La película	Rhajov Villafuerte	Flash animation	Based on the La familia del barrio TV Series created by Sergio Lebrija and Arturo Navarro; Streaming release by Vix. Fifth Mexican adult animated movie.
2024	Sabel: Redención; Sabel: Redemption	Benito Fernández	Traditional animation	Limited theatrical release. Sixth Mexican adult animated movie.
2025	Aztec Batman: Clash of Empires; Batman Azteca: Choque de Imperios	Juan Meza-León	Flash animation	Streaming world-wide release by HBO Max (except Mexico); Seventh Mexican adult animated movie.
2025	Soy Frankelda; I Am Frankelda	Arturo and Roy Ambriz	Stop Motion animation	Based on the Frankelda's Book of Spooks animated series created by Arturo and Roy Ambriz; Originally planned as a streaming release by HBO Max.
2026	La Familia del Barrio: La Maldición del Quinto Partido	Sergio "Teco" Lebrija; Ornella Antista	Flash animation	Second movie based on the TV series created by Segio "Teco" Lebrija and Arturo Navarro; Eighth Mexican adult animated movie.
2026	Bem: Un Lémur en Fuga	Leopoldo Aguilar	Flash animation	Leopoldo Aguilar's first 2D animated film.
2026	Gungo y los juegos cavernicolas Rock Bottom	Rodolfo Riva Palacio; Gabriel Riva Palacio	CG animation	Co-produced with Spain's 3Doubles Producciones
2026	La venganza del Charro Negro	Marvick Núñez	Flash animation	Eighth film in Las Leyendas franchise and co-produced with Mighty Animation and Philippines' Top Draw Animation.
2026	Mi Amigo el Sol	Alejandra Pérez	Tradigital animation	First Mexican animated feature film directed by a woman.

=== Upcoming ===
Year	Title International title	Director(s),¡	Technique	Studios(s)	Note(s)
TBA	Bugsted spin-off film	TBA	TBA	Ánima Estudios; Vodka Capital	
TBA	Inzomnia	Luis Telléz	Stop Motion animation	Inzomnia Animación; Los Atorrantes Studio; El Taller de Chucho	
TBA	La Balada del Fénix	Arturo and Roy Ambriz	Stop Motion animation	Cinema Fantasma	
TBA	Julia y el Portal del Abismo	César Cepeda	Stop Motion animation	Kraneo	
TBA	Mascotas y Sabandijas: La Película	Oscar Aragón	Stop Motion animation	Cerberus Studios	
TBA	La Tierra de los Calcetimonstruos	Benjamín Williams	Live Action/CG animation	Out of Light Entertainment; Producciones Helios Entertainment; Metacube Technology & Entertainment	First Mexican hybrid animated film.
TBA	A Mutt's Tale	Bruce Morris; Alejandra García Peña	CG animation	IMAGICA; Radiosity	
TBA	La Hora Mágica	Ricardo Niño	CG animation	Kaxan Animation	
TBA	Bruno	TBA	CG animation	Kaxan Animation	
TBA	Thingdom: El Reino de las Cosas	René Castillo	CG animation	Mandaraka	
TBA	El Crujir de las Hojas	Mauricio Flores	CG animation	ESCENA Animation Studio	
TBA	El Chapulín Colorado 3D	Roberto Gómez Fernández	CG animation	Metacube Technology & Entertainment	
TBA	Nezahualcóyotl: La Gran Historia	Raymundo Juárez	Traditional animation	Animación 2D Studio	Limited theatrical release.
TBA	Aztlán	Carlos Gutiérrez Medrano	CG animation	Metacube Technology & Entertainment	
TBA	Untitled Día de Muertos Sequel	Carlos Gutiérrez Medrano	CG animation	Metacube Technology & Entertainment	
TBA	Agavia and the Forgotten Kingdom	Carlos Gutiérrez Medrano	CG animation	Metacube Technology & Entertainment	
TBA	La Marca del Jaguar	Víctor Mayorga	2D animation	Ocelotl Company	Return to production in May 2021; Co-production with Brazil and France.
TBA	Hanta	Emilio Ramos	2D/CG/Rotoscopic animation	Atotonilco Estudio; Fedora Producciones	Co-production with Canada and Portugal.
TBA	El Último Coloso	Verónica Arceo	CG animation	Animex Producciones; Anahuac Films	
TBA	Ambrosía	???	2D animation	Peek Paax	
TBA	Ch'ulel	Sarah Emilia Páramo	2D animation	Fotosíntesis Media	
TBA	El Soprendente Brutus; The Amazing Brutus	Adriana Cid Flores	2D animation	Big Bear Animation; Mokiki Animation	
TBA	El Lenguaje de los Pájaros	Cynthia Fernández Trejo	2D animation	La Endina Remolona; Cine Bandada	
TBA	Kolaval	Karla Velázquez	2D animation	Dinamita Animación	Second co-production with Colombia.
TBA	Josefina y los Invencibles	Jorge A. Estrada	2D animation	Chiltepín Estudios; Cinematográfica en Gracia	
TBA	Canas al Aire	Luis Sánchez	CG animation	Animex Producciones; Grupo Barroca Films	First Animex animated feature film since 2016.
TBA	Garra de Jaguar	Iván Espinosa; Andrés Palma	CG animation	Ocho Venado Producciones	Production resumed in 2025.
TBA	Halloween vs. Día de Muertos	Celso García	CG animation	Lunch Films; Studio 100 International; Anahuác Films	
TBA	Catarina	Gerardo Rodríguez	Stop Motion animation	Graco Films	

== Lost or unreleased ==
Title International title	Director(s)	Technique	Note(s)
Roy del espacio	Rafael Angel Gil; Hector Lopez Carmona	N/A	Lost film, released in 1983.
El callejón de los sueños Alley of Dreams	Ricardo Gómez	CG animation	Cancelled.
Heriberto y Demetrio	Alfredo Sánchez Mejorada Herrera	CG animation	Cancelled.
Tierra de Revolucionarios	Antonio Ramos	CG animation	Lost Medium Film.
Maya: La Primera Gran Historia	Ricardo Arnaiz	Traditional animation	Cancelled.
Un Buen Trato	Ricardo Gómez	CG animation	Cancelled.
The Weerds	Ricardo Gómez	CG animation	Cancelled.
Papagiorgio: El Grande	Ricardo Gómez	CG animation	Cancelled.
Jungle Shuffle	Taedong Park; Mauricio De la Orta	CG animation	Unreleased in México.
Joyfluid	Alejandro Rodriguez Huerta	CG/Motion Capture	Not Released.
Al filo de la frontera	Alberto Mar	2D animation	Cancelled film.
Wango & Quark	Topo Gómez	CG animation	Cancelled release due the COVID-19 pandemic, originally called Nerdental.
Tepeyac: The Movie	Fernando Pomares; Enrique Navarrete	CG animation	Based on Juan Diego's story; Paused - Cancelled film status.

== Highest-grossing films ==
The following list consists the 13 highest-grossing Mexican animated feature films released in Mexico, based on data by Canacine (unless otherwise noted). Gross in Mexican peso and audience count (in millions).

Background colour † indicates films that are currently playing in theaters (as of November 2026)

Rank	Title	Gross	Audience	Year
1	La venganza del Charro Negro	MXN$232.17 million	4.3	2026
2	Un gallo con muchos huevos	MXN$167.8 million	4.1	2015
3	Una Película de Huevos	MXN$142.3 million	3.99	2006
4	Otra Película de Huevos y un Pollo	MXN$113.58 million	3.09	2009
5	Don gato y su pandilla	MXN$112.25 million	2.59	2011
6	La leyenda del Charro Negro	MXN$100.8 million	2.4	2018
7	La leyenda del Chupacabras	MXN$100.7 million	2.59	2016
8	La leyenda de las Momias de Guanajuato	MXN$92.25 million	2.3	2014
9	Dia de muertos	MXN$59.8 million	1.26	2019
10	La leyenda de la Llorona	MXN$55.4 million	1.4	2011
11	Don gato: El inicio de la pandilla	MXN$54.1 million	1.47	2015
12	Soy Frankelda	MXN$50.4 million	0.83	2025
13	Un rescate de huevitos	MXN$50 million	.9	2021

== See also ==
- List of highest-grossing Mexican films
