= Ánima Kitchent =

Animation company

- Type: Subsidiary
- Industry: Animation
- Genre: Animation; Children's media
- Founded: April 22, 2014; 12 years ago
- Founder: Victor M. López; Ángel Molinero; Miguel Aldasoro; Colman López; Rubén Zarauza; Luís Armengol
- Headquarters: Madrid, Spain
- Key people: Angel Molinero (CEO)
- Products: Television program
- Parent: DNEG
- Website: www.animakitchent.com

Ánima Kitchent is a specialized animation studio and production company which is a subsidiary of DNEG. It was formerly owned by the European-based Spanish production division of Mexican animation company Ánima until 2026. Ánima Kitchent is based in Madrid, Spain, and the Canary Islands, focused on creating, producing, and distributing high-quality 2D and 3D animated content for children and young audiences. It was founded in 2014 by five ex-Vodka Capital staff.

== History ==
Ánima Kitchent was first founded in April 2014, when Mexican entertainment & animation studio Ánima Estudios enterted the European animation & production operations & colloaborated with former executives of Spanish independent & production company Vodka Capital which were its managing director Angel Molinero, head of international sales Miguel Aldasoro, line producer & producer of Jelly Jamm, Carolina Matas, technical manager Luis Armengol, and Ruben Zarauza, by opening a new Spanish-based European animation subsidiary based in Madrid, Spain, entitled Ánima Kitchent as the four executive would lead, the new Madrid-based production subsidiary would produce its animated series & films with international companies with the new studio signed a deal with Famosa to produce a new animated series based on Famosa's toy line Pinypon.

In September 2018, Ánima Kitchent had announced that its co-founder & co-CEO Victor M. Lopez had deaptured the Madrid-based European animation production studio after four years with Victor M. Lopez returning to fellow Madrid-based entertainment studio Zinkia Entertainment (now Animaj) three months later in December of that year as the latter's president while he launched his own company based in the Canary Islands named KOYI Media. One month later in October of that same year, Ánima Kitchent announced that its co-founder Rubén Zarauza and its Director of Marketing, Elena Catalán, had left the Madrid-based studio to join Amuse Studio, the French digital animation subsidiary of Paris-based animation studio Millimages, with the duo launching its Gran Canaria-based Spanish unit Birdland.

In December 2024, Ánima Kitchent stregnthened its operations in the Canary Islands had partnered with fellow Madrid-based entertainment company Able & Baker to established a joint-venture production service subsidiary based in the Canary Islands and capitize Spain's tax in animation production entitled Monkeys & Dinos, the new joint-venture animation subsidiary would handle animation services for programs produced by Ánima Kitchent and Able & Baker as the former's founder & CEO Angel Molinero and Able & Baker co-founder Carlos Tschuschke leading the joint venture service studio.

In March 2025, Ánima Kitchent formed a co-production partnetship with Indonesian animation & post-production company Mocca Studio to bring the former's digital series Tippi T-Rex into an TV animated comedy series based on Ánima Kitchent's short series of the same name with the Indonesian studio will handle animation for the new adaptation alongside Ánima Kitchent's Canary Islands-based studio. Their partnetship was later expanded one year later in February 2026, when Ánima Kitchent had formed a co-production agreement with Mocca Studio to produce the latter's animated series Baby Zu.

Ánima Kitchent was acquired by DNEG in June 2026.

== Filmography ==
Title	Years	Network	Notes
PINY: Institute of New York	2017–2018	Disney Channel España	co-production with Famosa Animation
Cleo & Cuquin	2018–2019	Clan; Canal 5 (Mexico)	co-production with MAI Productions, Televisa and Selecta Vision
Brave Bunnies	2020–present	PLUSPLUS	co-production with Glowberry and WildBrain Studios (season 2–)
Tippi T-Rex	2023–present	YouTube	co-production with Mocca Studio

=== Marketing only ===
- Jelly Jamm
- Bugsted (in co-production with Ánima Estudios)
- Pirata & Capitano
