= R. Martin Klein =

American voice actor

- Other names: Robert Martin Klein; Robert Klein; Bob Klein
- Occupation: Voice actor
- Years active: 1981–present

R. Martin Klein is an American theater, film, and voice actor who went under the alias name Bob Marx in his earlier dubbing work during the 1990s. He is best known for playing Gomamon/Ikkakumon in Digimon: Digital Monsters, Fukurou in Noein and Katsuhiko Jinnai in El Hazard. In addition to voiceovers, Klein has also worked on theater and film productions.

== Filmography ==
=== Anime ===
- Battle B-Daman - The Big Cheese, Additional Voices
- Blue Dragon - Marumaro
- Cyborg 009 - Ivan Whisky/Cyborg 001
- Digimon: Digital Monsters - Bukamon/Gomamon/Ikkakumon (Adventure-Adventure 02), Professor Takenouchi (Adventure 02), Toshiaki Mori (Tamers), Gotsumon (Frontier), Additional Voices
- Digimon Data Squad - Gomamon, Zudomon
- Digimon Fusion - Archelomon, Bukamon
- Eagle Riders - Mallanox
- El Hazard - Katsuhiko Jinnai
- FLCL - Gaku
- Flint the Time Detective - Flint Hammerhead
- Giant Robo - Additional Voices
- Gatchaman - Solaris
- Hand Maid May - Kotaro Nanbara
- Hyper Doll - Kurageman
- Magical Meow Meow Taruto - Kakipi
- MÄR - Pozan
- Mirmo! - Kororo
- Mobile Suit Gundam: The 08th MS Team - Jidan Nickard
- Mon Colle Knights - Impy, Additional Voices
- Noein - Fukurou
- Zatch Bell! - Grisor

=== Non-anime ===
- Animalia - Iggy D'Iguana, Horble, Zed, Victor
- Dwegons - Nosey Three Horn, Bloochip, Squats
- LeapFrog - Edison the Firefly (5 DVDs, as "Robert Mark Klein")
- Lego Star Wars: The Padawan Menace - Chancellor Palpatine, Darth Sidious, Republic Guard
- Wild Animal Baby - Izzy the Owl (as "Robert Mark Klein")

=== Live-action ===
- Power Rangers in Space - Seymour (voice, uncredited)

=== Film ===
- A Martian Christmas - Office Manager, Martian Officer (as "Robert Mark Klein")
- Alpha and Omega 2: A Howl-iday Adventure - Tony, Rouge#2 (as "Bill Lader")
- Alpha and Omega 4: The Legend of the Saw Tooth Cave - Tony (as "Bill Lader")
- Perfect Blue - Mr. Me-Mania
- Digimon: The Movie - Gomamon
- Meet the Fockers - Moe Focker (DVD Extended)
- Digimon Adventure tri. - Bukamon/Gomamon/Ikkakumon, Additional voices (as "Bob Klein")
- The Little Polar Bear - Lemming
- Digimon Adventure: Last Evolution Kizuna - Gomamon/Ikkakumon (as "Bob Klein")
- Cinderella and the Secret Prince - Manny (as "Bob Klein")
- Digimon Adventure: Our War Game! (standalone dub) - Gomamon, Male Neighbor 2A, Additional Voices

=== Video games ===
- .hack series - Harald Hoerwick, Marlo
- Digimon All-Star Rumble - Tentomon, MegaKabuterimon, TyrantKabuterimon, Gomamon, Plesiomon, Aegisdramon
- Paraworld - Trader
- Star Ocean: First Departure - Lias Warren
