= Ánima (company) =

Mexican animation studio

Ánima Estudios, S.A.P.I. de C.V.
- Type: Sociedad Anónima Promotora de Inversión de Capital Variable
- Industry: Animation
- Genre: Animation; Entertainment
- Founded: 2002; 24 years ago
- Founder: Fernando De Fuentes S. Jose C. Garcia De Letona
- Headquarters: Mexico City, Mexico
- Key people: Jose C. Garcia De Letona (COO/Executive Vice President)
- Products: Animated films Television shows YouTube Channels; Web series Mobile apps Licensing and Merchandising
- Website: helloanima.com

Ánima Estudios, S.A.P.I de C.V., also known as Ánima, is a Mexican animation studio founded in 2002 and based in Mexico City. The studio’s first film, Magos y Gigantes, released in November 2003.

It is the leading studio in Latin America and a recognized company in the global animation industry, specializing in 2D and CG productions. Some of Ánima’s best-known works include the El Chavo Animado series, Top Cat: The Movie, and the Legend Quest franchise. Ánima has produced entertainment brands and original projects for both family and adult audiences.

== History ==
=== Founding and early projects (2002–2005) ===
Ánima was founded in 2002 by Fernando de Fuentes Sáinz and José Carlos García de Letona Velasco. García de Letona and de Fuentes Sáinz were former employees of Alo.com, a Mexican multimedia-hosting website that hosted user-generated animations until its shutdown in 2002.

On 19 November 2003, Ánima released its first film, Magos y Gigantes. This 2D family film, which tells the story of three misfit fairytale friends on a journey to compete in a renowned tournament of magic, is the first Mexican-animated feature produced in over 30 years. The movie was distributed by 20th Century Fox.

On 19 August 2005, the studio releases its second film: Imaginum. This sci-fi comedy film is later distributed globally by Porchlight Entertainment and sells in over 90 countries.

On 14 December 2005, Ánima Estudios enters a partnership with Estación Espacial to produce Poncho Balón. This mini-series about the adventures of a crazy football runs on Canal 5 in Mexico and Cartoon Network Latin America.

On 21 October 2006, Ánima Estudios produces its first full-length TV series, El Chavo Animado. Based on the live-action series El Chavo del Ocho created by Roberto Gómez Bolaños. The series premieres in Mexico on Canal 5. The series later premiered in the U.S. on Univision to highly successful ratings. To-date, El Chavo has garnered the highest ratings for an animated series in all of Latin America.

On 13 February 2009, the studio released its third film: El Agente 00-P2, a parody of the James Bond movie franchise.

On 10 November 2009, the company released the sci-fi holiday special A Martian Christmas direct-to-video as a co-venture with Porchlight Entertainment.

=== 2010–2015 ===
On 22 January 2010, the studio releases its fifth animated film, AAA – Sin Límite en el Tiempo, a fictional take on the popular Mexican lucha libre professional wrestling league, AAA.

On 8 May 2010, Jose C. Garcia de Letona becomes the founder and president of ASIFA Mexico as well as an ASIFA International's board member.

On 11 May 2010, Ánima releases Kung Fu Magoo, a comedy-adventure film based on the cartoon character Mr. Magoo. It is produced in partnership with DreamWorks Classics (Classic Media) and marks the first time a Latin American animation production is sold to the U.S. market, as the film premiered on Disney XD on February 7, 2011, featuring the voices of Chris Parnell, Dylan and Cole Sprouse, Alyson Stoner, and Kenny Mayne as himself. The film is distributed worldwide in 65 territories.

On 10 September 2010, along with co-producers Illusion Studios (Argentina) releases the CG animated film, Gaturro, in Argentina. Based on the Argentinian comic book series of the same name, Gaturro is later released on April 27, 2012, in Mexico, distributed by Santo Domingo Films. On February 16, 2016, the film is released in the U.S., straight-to-DVD, by Viva Pictures.

On 16 September 2011, the studio releases Top Cat: The Movie, (a.k.a. Don Gato y su Pandilla) in Mexico, through Warner Bros. Pictures. Based on the Hanna-Barbera cartoon of the same name, the film was a huge box office hit in Mexico and one of the most successful releases ever for a Mexican production. On August 2, 2013, Top Cat: The Movie received a limited theatrical release in the U.S. through Viva Pictures, featuring the voice talents of Rob Schneider and Danny Trejo as Lou Strickland and Griswald, respectively. To-date, Top Cat: The Movie is one of the "Top 20" highest-grossing independent animated movies worldwide.

On 21 October 2011, the studio released the horror-comedy film, La Leyenda de la Llorona, which is a sequel to Animex's La Leyenda de la Nahuala. The movie was among the top 5 most successful movies of the year in Mexico.

In 2012, the company celebrated its 10th anniversary.

On 30 November 2012, the studio releases El Santos vs. La Tetona Mendoza under its adult animated label Átomo Films. This adaption of the Mexican comic book series created by José Ignacio Solórzano (Jis) and José Trinidad Camacho (Trino), it stars an ensemble voice cast of well-known Mexican actors such as Daniel Giménez Cacho, José María Yazpik, Héctor Jiménez, and veteran filmmaker Guillermo del Toro. In 2013 El Santos becomes the first Mexican animated feature to premiere at the renowned Annecy International Animation Film Festival.

On 31 December 2012, Ánima Estudios premiered its original TV show, Teenage Fairytale Dropouts on Seven Network in Australia. This 52x11 comedy is an international co-venture between Ánima, SLR Productions (Australia), Home Plate Entertainment (America) and Telegael (Ireland). The show, which is loosely based on the studio's first film, "Magos y Gigantes", premieres in the U.S. on the Hub Network, marking the first time a Latin American animated series is acquired by a major U.S. network. The series airs in some 35 countries including on Spain (TVE) and HBO Asia. Later on October 16, 2017, the series is acquired by Bejuba! Entertainment for new distribution rights and is renamed Awesome Magical Tales.

On 5 February 2013, through a partnership with Spain's Vodka Capital and Televisa Home Entertainment, Ánima Estudios releases a multi-platform, 13-episode, TV series titled Bugsted. The franchise, which tells the story of an ordinary bug who is accidentally taken to the moon with the Apollo 11 mission, consists of a series of collectible action figures, a game app developed for the iOS and Android systems and a TV miniseries aimed for children 8–11.

On 17 October 2013, Latin Idea Ventures announces it will invest an undisclosed amount into Ánima to assist with the studio's expansion plans.

On 22 April 2014, Ánima Estudios launches a European division based in Madrid, Spain, named Ánima Kitchent.

On 22 May 2014, Televisa Interactive Media publishes and releases KickOs, a new soccer-themed game app developed by Ánima for the Android and iOS systems. The app was available on the iTunes App Store and Google Play.

On 17 September 2014, Variety reported that an animated follow-up to Top Cat: The Movie, titled Top Cat Begins, has been announced for release on 7 August 2015, distributed by Warner Bros. Pictures. Additionally, it is also announced that the studio is currently in production with a feature film adaptation of DePatie-Freleng's Here Comes the Grump.

On 30 October 2014, the studio releases La Leyenda de las Momias de Guanajuato. It becomes the first Mexican film ever to be produced in the motion-enhanced 4DX format. It was a box-office success, grossing over $90 million pesos.

On 18 February 2015, European subsidiary Ánima Kitchent, announces a partnership with the Spain-based Famosa to adapt its PinyPon brand into an animated television series.

On 10 April 2015, Ánima releases its first CG-animated feature, Wicked Flying Monkeys. This original adaptation of The Wizard of Oz book series, debuts in third place at the box office. It is produced with India's Discreet Arts. Most notably, the film is designed, written and executive produced by Jorge Gutierrez of The Book of Life fame. Wicked Flying Monkeys is simultaneously released in Russia, making it the first Latin American movie to receive a wide commercial release in the country. At the 2015 2015 Cannes Film Festival, the film is sold for distribution to such countries as the U.K., Germany, Austria, Switzerland, Australia and New Zealand. Wicked Flying Monkeys launches in the U.S. on January 24, 2017, as Guardians of Oz.

On 15 April 2015, the studio's third animated television series, El Chapulín Colorado, premieres on the digital platform Veo. Shortly after, the series is released on Televisa's free-to-air networks in Mexico and throughout all of Latin America.

On 30 October 2015, the studio releases Top Cat Begins in Mexico through Warner Bros.Pictures. A CG-animated follow-up to Top Cat: The Movie debuted third place in the Mexican box office. To-date the movie has been released in the U.K., Colombia, Bulgaria, Turkey, Portugal, Israel, Hong Kong, India, Australia and New Zealand, among many others.

On 24 August 2015, the studio releases the music video Vamos a la Cama, starring La Familia Telerín in Mexico during primetime on Channel 2. The uber-popular vid is broadcast daily during the same timeslot for the following 10 months. Produced in English, the reboot series will consist up to 52 7-minute episodes.

=== 2016 ===
On 18 February 2016, Frederator Networks and Ánima launch a YouTube channel called Átomo Network. The channel features original programming produced by Ánima, original programming from Latin America, as well as Spanish-dubbed versions of Channel Frederator shows like "107 Facts." "Átomo Network opens up a new global outlet for audiences and creators alike. We aim to give Spanish-speaking audiences all over the world an entertainment destination specifically tailored to them," said José C. García de Letona, COO & Executive Vice President Ánima.

On 15 April 2016, in order to assist in the growth of the professional animation industry in Latin America, Ánima announces a partnership with California Institute of the Arts (CALARTS). The partnership demonstrates Anima's commitment for the growth of the animation industry in Latin America.[68] "It is an honor and a privilege to start this relationship with CalArts," said COO Jose C. Garcia de Letona. "We are positive [that] it will have a long term impact in the quality of our productions, the animation industry in Latin America, and in the professional lives of our staff."

On 26 May 2016, Ánima and Cartoon Network (Latin America) announce that they will jointly produce an animation contest for young creators to pitch their own animated content developed for children ages 6 to 11. The Seventh Knight, created by Andrés Eduardo Luna Rivera and Sebastián Felipe Luna Rivera from Colombia, and WTQ: What the Quest is This? created by Ernesto Molina from Mexico, tie for first prize. "We aim to grow the industry not only in Mexico but in Latin America as well. There's a lot of amazing creators in the region who have wonderful projects that should be supported and promoted", commented Anima COO Jose C. Garcia de Letona. "We are very happy with the response we got to this contest," said Hernan La Greca, senior creative director for Cartoon Network Latin America and its subsidiaries. "We are thrilled to support animation in Latin America through initiatives that promote the development of new talent and provide exposure to new ideas and productions." Ánima COO José C. García Letona also added that the company's response to the contest "has surpassed our expectations, not only for the number of projects that were submitted, but also for their quality. We are excited to confirm that there's a huge amount of talent in Latin America committed to creating animated content."

On 12 September 2016, the studio's European division, Ánima Kitchent, launches PINY: Institute of New York on Disney Channel, Spain. Based on the toy brand of the same name, this 52x11 comedy features Michelle Fairchild, a student at the college who wants to become a top fashion designer. The series is produced with Televisa and Russian broadcasters Karusel TV and Ani.

On 14 October 2016, the studio releases La leyenda del Chupacabras theatrically in the U.S. and in Mexico on October 21, 2016, where it becomes one of the top grossing Mexican films of all time. During its opening weekend at the Mexican box office, this Alberto Rodriguez directed film pulls in over 1 million viewers in just 3 days, becoming one of the top 20 grossing Mexican films of all time. "We are beyond happy with the results at the box office and the ever-growing loyal following our Leyendas have in Latin America," said Ánima EVP and COO, José C. García de Letona.

=== 2017 ===
On 12 January 2017, Forbes Magazine recognizes Fernando de Fuentes S. and Jose C. Garcia de Letona for founding Ánima.

On 24 February 2017, based on the Leyendas horror-comedy film saga, the company releases Las Leyendas (a.k.a. Legend Quest) on Netflix worldwide. Produced and written by James Kreig, the series is the first original offering as part of a larger, ongoing relationship with the streaming giant. It is also the first Netflix original to be produced in Latin America and also the first Netflix original Animated show produced out of a non-English speaking country.

On 6 March 2017, Ánima and Cartoon Network launch a second animation contest for short format series. The winning short series concept, Ram Pam Dam, is chosen from among 170+ projects from 17 different countries. "We're proud and happy to continue our efforts on supporting creators from Latin America showcase their talents; we are also extremely honored to have Cartoon Network as our partner in this initiative for the second year in a row".

On 4 June 2017, La leyenda del Chupacabras wins "Anima Latina's Best Latin American Movie" award in Buenos Aires, Argentina.

On 12 June 2017, Ánima's Ana & Bruno becomes the second of the studio's films to be recognized as an Official Selection during the Annecy Film Festival.

On 14 June 2017, Entrepreneur Magazine recognizes Jose C. Garcia de Letona and Fernando de Fuentes S. as two of its "Top 5" most innovative business leaders in LATAM in its yearly "Entrepreneur Rockstars" edition.

On 11 July 2017, the Guadalajara, Mexico-based theme park, Selva Mágica, unveils the first VR Ride created specifically for the Latin American market called, Cantinflas The Time Machine. The animated short portion of the ride is produced by Anima and stars Mexican icon "Cantinflas". "As our first virtual reality project we had the amazing opportunity to work in such a different and powerful medium and explore its many possibilities, having the short feature such an emblematic character as Cantinflas is an honor by itself, the whole experience and the trust placed in us by Ventura Entertainment (Selva Magica's holding company) makes us very proud and thankful" commented José C. García de Letona, Anima's COO.

On 21 July 2017, Monster Island is released theatrically in the UK, Mexico, South Korea, China, Spain, France and several other countries. On December 1, 2017, it enjoys a worldwide debut as a Netflix exclusive movie.

On 3 August 2017, the IDB (Inter-American Development Bank) names Anima one of the 50 most innovative companies in Latin America.

On 7 September 2017, José C. García de Letona, Ánima's COO is featured as a keynote speaker at the 2017 Pixelatl Festival. His presentation focuses on the 15th Anniversary of the studio and how the industry has evolved over the last decade and a half of expansion. He also showcases many of the global achievements of the company.

On 2 November 2017, in partnership Bogotá-based Teravision Games, the studio releases "Las Leyendas: El Pergamino Mágico" an app based on the Leyendas franchise.

=== 2018 ===
On 1 January 2018, the company unveils a new logo, announced on their social media, and was renamed to "Ánima". The whole company, including Anima Kitchent is known just as Ánima moving forward.

On 19 January 2018, the studio releases La leyenda del Charro Negro, the fifth installment of the Leyendas film franchise. Its run at the box office makes it the best-performing film in the saga. It is released in select theaters in the U.S. on March 23, 2018, by Pantelion Films.

On 22 January 2018, Ánima's Cleo & Cuquín, a 7x52 television adaptation of Spain's Familia Telerín, premieres on the Nick Jr. Channel in the U.S. The preschool comedy also appears on Netflix, Spain's Clan TV and Discovery Kids. Ánima later signs Mattel as Global Master Toy partner for the series. "Cleo &Cuquín is a great opportunity for us to bring to life characters that not only appeal to today's preschoolers but also have nostalgia with parents in markets where Familia Telerín has strong heritage", says Lauren DeFeo, vice president, Toy Box division, Mattel

On 1 March 2018, Ánima in co-production with London-based Prime Focus World releases a CG-animated feature film adaptation of DePatie-Freleng's Here Comes the Grump in Italy. Lead voice talent includes British actors Lily Collins, Ian McShane and Toby Kebbell. "Having such amazing actors be part of our movie makes us feel even more excited about it. We are sure that the audiences will love McShane's grouchy character, Lily's adorable princess and Toby's cool hero," added José C. García de Letona, film's producer. To-date, Here comes the Grump has been released theatrically in Mexico, the U.K., South Africa, Israel, Russia, Estonia, Ukraine, Hungary, Singapore and Kuwait and it has scheduled release dates for China, Portugal, Poland, Greece, Iceland, Serbia, Croatia, Vietnam, Middle East, Turkey, South Korea, France, Spain, Bolivia, Ecuador, Uruguay and Paraguay.

On 7 April 2018, Ánima's Ana & Bruno wins the award for "Best Feature Film" at the inaugural Quirino Awards. The film is a co-production between Ánima, Lo Coloco Films and Altavista Films. José C. García de Letona and Fernando de Fuentes S. are producers on the project. The Quirinos is the first initiative to recognize talent across the entire Ibero-American animation industry.

On 11 July 2018, Fernando de Fuentes S. assumes the role of president of Canacine, Mexico's chamber organization dedicated to the country's cinema industry.

On 15 August 2018, the leading business magazine in Latin America, Expansión, recognizes José C. García de Letona as one of the "7 most successful film producers" to have revived the movie industry in Mexico creating a new Golden Age of Mexican cinema.

On 20 August 2018, Alto Nivel Magazine profiles Jose C. Garcia de Letona, Anima's COO and co-founder, and recognizes him as one of the leading entertainment industry executives in Latin America.

On 22 November 2018, Space Chickens in Space debuted on Disney Channel networks in Europe, Middle East and Africa and 9Go! in Australia. The show centers on the adventures of three chickens — Chuck, Starley, and Finley — who are accidentally enrolled in an elite intergalactic former military academy. The 52x 11 minute series is a co-production between Anima, Disney EMEA, Cake Entertainment and Studio Moshi.

On 11 December 2018, José C. García de Letona, Ánima's COO is featured as a keynote speaker at Ventana Sur (Buenos Aires, Argentina), organized by Marché du Film – Cannes Film Festival and the Argentinean National Institute of Cinema & Audiovisual Arts.

=== 2019 ===
On 25 January 2019, Anima's Cleo & Cuquin is nominated for "Best Ibero-American Animation Series" for the Quirino Awards.

On 8 February 2019, Animation Ireland announces the nominees for the third Irish Animation Awards with Space Chickens in Space earning the honor of being the most-nominated program with six nods.

On 28 February 2019, Ánima alongside Pixelatl Festival and Mighty Studios announces La Cumbre, a new summit dedicated to enabling networking and collaborations between Mexican animation studios and support them to achieve world-class animation through partnerships with major animation studios globally. Jose Iñesta from Pixelatl, Luispa Salmon from Mighty and Jose C. Garcia de Letona (Anima's COO) are the founders of this initiative.

On 9 March 2019, at the Guadalajara International Film Festival (FICG), Melissa Cobb, Netflix Vice President Kids & Family and director Guillermo del Toro announced a brand new Netflix Original series as a follow-up to Anima's Legend Quest show, which itself is also a Netflix Original.

On 23 March 2019, the Irish Animation Awards organized by Animation Ireland recognizes Space Chickens in Space with the "Kids Choice Award For Best Animated Series (6-12 years)" and also the "Best VFX as part of Animated TV Series or Film" award. "The level of quality this year has been truly outstanding from all the entrants and it really highlights the magnificent talent of the animation sector" said Animation Ireland Chairperson Moe Honan

On 6 April 2019, Ánima announces its upcoming theatrical release; La Liga de los 5, an epic adventure with Mexican superheroes. Upcoming films include La liga de los 5 and Cranston Academy: Monster Zone, a CG animation horror-comedy film. They're expected to be released in 2019. The second season of Netflix's Legend Quest is expected to debut by the end of 2019.

On 16 April 2019, since the Premiere of Cleo & Cuquín in early 2018 the show has been the #1 preschool show on free-to-air television in both Spain and Mexico, having eclipsed globally successful properties such as Peppa Pig, Paw Patrol and PJ Masks.

On 23 April 2019, Ánima and producers Fernando de Fuentes and José C García de Letona make history at the Ariel Awards (Mexican Film Academy awards) with 3 nominations in the "Best Feature Length Animated Film" category with the films Here Comes the Grump, La leyenda del Charro Negro and Ana y Bruno. On 24 June 2019, Ana and Bruno wins the highly prestigious award.

On 5 October 2019 Anima's Netflix Original "Legend Quest: Masters of Myth" will be released worldwide. The new 13-episode series is executive produced by Fernando de Fuentes S. José C. García de Letona and Jim Krieg.

On 1 November 2019 it was revealed that the main cast voice for Anima's "Cranston Academy: Monster Zone", is led by Jamie Bell (Billy Elliot, Rocketman) as Danny, and Ruby Rose (Batwoman, Orange is the New Black) as Liz. The movie will be released in 2020.

On 11 November 2019 Anima's comedy series "Space Chickens in Space" will launch on Disney Latino America. The show was created by José C. García de Letona and Rita Street, designed and directed by award-winning Norwegian twins Tommy and Markus Vad Flaaten (Twin Trash).

=== 2020 ===
On 10 January 2020, La liga de los 5 is theatrically released in Mexico to great critical acclaim.

On 22 January 2020, Anima's Space Chickens in Space is nominated for "Best Ibero-American Animation Series" for the Quirino Awards, which awards honor the very best animation projects in LATAM, Spain & Portugal. The series is an Anima coproduction with Disney and Cake Entertainment.

On 23 January 2020, Aardman Animation acquires distribution rights for Brave Bunnies, the 2D animated pre-school series co-produced by Ánima and Glowberry, it is currently in production and will be released in 2021. Spin Master is on board as global toy partner.

On 24 January 2020, Cleo & Cuquin premiered in China on CCTV (China Central Television), marking a new milestone in the global reach and success of the brand.

On 4 February 2020, Educational App Cleo & Cuquin: Explore + Learn has been nominated for the 2020 Kidscreen Awards. On February 12, 2020, the app is announced as the winner of the Best Learning App category.

On 27 April 2020, Jose C Garcia de Letona collaborates with the International Bank of Development (BID) as an expert in the course "The Value of Creativity and Innovation: The Orange Economy", so people from Latin America and the world have the opportunity to learn more about the creative industries and its infinite potential.

On 26 June 2020, "Liga de los 5" got a 90% freshness score from Rotten Tomatoes Latin website (Tomatazos) making it one the very best reviewed movies ever at the platform. It is directed by Marvick Nunez and produced by Jose C. Garcia de Letona & Fernando de Fuentes.

On 2 September 2020 Milkshake! acquired the first season of Brave Bunnies co-produced by Ánima and Glowberry and distributed by Aardman. The show is set to air on Milkshake! next year.

On 7 October 2020, Ánima and Touche Films announced an alliance to produce animated content based on the universe of Enchufe TV. Enchufe TV is by far the most successful YouTube channel in all of the Spanish speaking world, racking up billions of views on their live action comedy sketches and series. "Touché Films is the perfect partner to create original content for a teen and young adult audience. We love their characters and we're excited to work with their talented team" commented José C. García de Letona, Anima's COO. Arturo Yepez, Touche Films' CEO added "This partnership allows us to merge the creativity of Touche Films and the universe of enchufe.tv with Anima's sensibility, quality and first class animation capabilities"

On 6 November 2020, Ánima and Lunes Animation (Chile) announced a new show aimed at teens and adults based in the most popular comic strip in Latin America, Condorito, "we want the Condorito sitcom to be enjoyed all over the world, not just in the region; that's why we are confident Ánima's expertise and sensibility will help us achieve this ambitious goal" said Jose Navarro, CEO at Lunes. "Condorito is one of the most cherished characters in all of Latin America. We are so proud of the opportunity to bring these characters to life through animation.We will be loyal to the character's essence and origins while at the same time giving him a new, fresh look and having a contemporary approach to the stories" José C. García de Letona, COO @ Anima.

On 12 November 2020, El Camino de Xico is theatrically released in LATAM reaching an extraordinary 98% score at Rotten Tomatoes ("Tomatazos", the Spanish language site), being one of the top movie scores of the year. The movie was also sold to Netflix worldwide; in various territories it became one of the Top 10 most viewed for several weeks. The movie was produced by Jose C. Garcia de Letona, Fernando de Fuentes and Cristina Pineda.

=== 2021 ===
On 24 February 2021, Anima marks a new milestone at the Quirino Awards being the first company nominated three times in the same category; with "La liga de los cinco", "El Camino de XIco" and "Cranston Academy: Monster Zone" up for Best Ibero-American Animation Feature Film.

On 20 May 2021, Brave Bunnies hits the #1 slot for preschoolers in Milkshake (UK) just a few months after its release. Also being broadcast with great results in Australia and Italy.

On 9 August 2021, Ánima launches Adult-YA division, unveils 'El Santos' series adaptation of the company's 2012 comic book-inspired feature "El Santos vs la Tetona Mendoza." "We've seen so much appetite from platforms and networks for content that's animated for adults and young adults," García de Letona explained.

On 18 August 2021, 'Cranston Academy: Monster Zone' and 'La liga de los 5' were nominated for Best animated feature at the Ariel Awards (Mexican Film Academy awards).

On 30 September 2021, El Camino de Xico was nominated for Best animated feature at the Platino awards which recognized excellence in the Ibero-American audiovisual industry.

On 4 October 2021, Disney+ Latin America Acquires 'Las Leyendas' Films from Mexican Animation Powerhouse Ánima. "Since the initial launch with the first film in 2007, 'Las Leyendas' films continue to be ranked as some of the top grossing movies of all time in Mexico achieving tremendous box-office and audience success with each film more successful than the previous one," said José C. García de Letona, COO and co-founder of Ánima.

=== 2022 ===
On 17 February 2022, Anima's Brave Bunnies is nominated in the Quirino Awards for the Best Ibero-American Animation Series; Jose C. Garcia de Letona & Fernando de Fuentes are Executive Producers on the series.

On 20 April 2022, the 52 episodes’ series Space Chickens In Space started streaming on Disney+ in Europe. The show was created by José C. García de Letona and Rita Street, directed by award-winning Norwegian twins Tommy and Markus Vad Flaaten and produced by Fernando De Fuentes S., José C. García de Letona has won the Kids Choice Awards for Best Animated Series at the Irish Animation Awards, among others.

On 13 June 2022, HBO Max Latin America unveiled a new take on the Dark Knight in the upcoming animation feature “Aztec Batman: Clash of Empires” in the first ever collaboration of Ánima with Warner Bros. Animation. The original film places the iconic DC superhero against the backdrop of Aztec Mexico and immerses viewers in the enigmatic culture of Mesoamerica. Juan Meza-León (“Harley Quinn”) directs the feature, while Anima's José C. García de Letona and Fernando De Fuentes serve as producers.

On 15 July 2022, Ánima announced their collaboration with Green Kids Club in creating the comedy action adventure series Victor and the Infinite & Mysterious Hallway of Loos, which focuses on the adventures of a middle school kid. ”

On 5 August 2022, IDW and Ánima announced the development of an adult animated series “Brutal Nature.” García de Letona who serves as COO at Ánima commented: “’Brutal Nature’ will help us keep building up high quality stories with a Latin sensibility that can be enjoyed all over the world and we can't think of a better partner to achieve it.”

On 6 September 2022, HBO Max reveals Horacio García Rojas, Omar Chaparro and Álvaro Morte as the main voices of "Aztec Batman: Clash of Empires" in celebration of the 83rd anniversary of Batman, the iconic DC character Comics. The film will be produced entirely in Mexico by Warner Bros. Animation, Ánima and Chatrone.

On 12 December 2022, WildBrain, Glowberry and Ánima partner on "Brave Bunnies" preschool franchise across new production, distribution and consumer products for season two of the successful show which follows the adventures of two rabbits.

=== 2023 ===
On 24 April 2023, "Cuquin", the new animated series of the youngest sibling of the beloved Familia Telerín, premiered in HBO Max and Cartoonito. This new series is fun for the whole family and will show that the best adventures are the ones you have with your best friends. "Cuquin" was created by Sean Gabuat and Rodrigo Pineda, while Marc Seal (PJ Masks) and Lisa Akhurst (PJ Masks) oversaw script and narrative developments. Fernando De Fuentes S., José C. García de Letona, Ángel Molinero, Miguel Aldasoro and Rodrigo Pineda are series' executive producers.

On 15 June 2023, during the prestigious Annecy International Animation Film Festival, "Aztec Batman: Clash of Empires" was presented in the Work in Progress sessions by director Juan Meza-León, character designer Marvick Núñez, art director Diego Olascoaga, producer José C. García de Letona and Peter Girardi, vice-president at Warner Bros. Animation.

On 3 July 2023, a new film of the successful saga "Las Leyendas" was announced: "La Leyenda de los Chaneques" which will be release exclusively on ViX.

On 14 July 2023, "La Leyenda de los Chaneques", the 7th film of the "Las Leyendas" saga was released in the U.S., México, and Central America on ViX. This film franchise has become the most successful saga in the history of the Mexican Film Industry. Produced by Fernando De Fuentes S. & José C. García de Letona and directed by Marvick Núñez.

=== 2024 ===
On October 10, 2024, José C. García de Letona (COO) shared a panel at SubliMe Jalisco 2024 with Damián Perea (Animayo), where they discussed budgets, pipelines, and production in animation within an AI era.

On October 17, 2024, a special preview on "Azteca Batman" was presented by Juan Meza-León (director) and José C. García de Letona (producer) during the DC panel titled “Bats in Translation" (“Aztec Batman: Clash of Empires” & "Batman Ninja Vs the Yakuza League") at New York Comic Con's main venue.

On November 5, 2024, José C. García de Letona, COO of Ánima, participated in the panel "How to Find the Right Global Partners" at the World Animation Summit. He was joined by industry leaders including Bob Higgins (Trustbridge Entertainment), Adrianna "AJ" Cohen (Mikros Animation), Rick Mischel (Artists Animation Studio), and Frank Falcone (Guru Studio). Sander Schwartz (Sandman TV & Films) served as the moderator. The participants shared their success stories and insights on building successful international collaborations in animation.

On November 27, 2024, founding partners of Ánima, Fernando De Fuentes S. (CEO) and José C. García de Letona (COO), conducted a masterclass on animation at the Comfama Animation Market in Medellín, Colombia.

=== 2025 ===
On July 10, 2025, the first trailer for "Aztec Batman: Clash of Empires" was shown alongside "Superman" in Mexican theaters, confirming a wide theatrical release on September 18, 2025, in Mexico and LATAM.

On July 24, 2025, at Comic Con San Diego, members of the cast and the creative team of the highly anticipated animated movie "Aztec Batman: Clash of Empires": José C. García de Letona (Ánima - producer), Aaron Berger (Chatrone - producer), Juan Meza-Leon (director), Horacio García Rojas (Yohualli/Batman - Spanish version), Raymond Cruz (Yoka/Joker - English version), Ernie Altbaker (writer), and Peter Girardi (Executive VP WB Bros. Animation) premiered a new trailer, shared never before seen footage and gave an inside look at how they brought the world of Batman into the captivating history and culture of Mesoamerica. The talk was moderated by Jorge R. Gutierrez (Maya and the Three / The Book of Life) and concluded with a standing ovation from the audience.

On September 18, 2025, the film "Aztec Batman, Clash of Empires", a collaboration between DC Comics, WB Animation, Chatrone, and Anima, was released in Mexican theaters; it received amazing positive reviews by both fans and general Mexican audiences.

On November 7, 2025, the success continued on streaming platforms. Since its debut on HBO Max Latin America "Aztec Batman, Clash of Empires" has become the No. 1 film on the platform's Top 10 films list. Becoming a first trailer release in North America, it released on January 15, 2026, on Prime Video and Netflix on March 7, 2026.

=== 2026 ===
In June 2026, Spanish subsidiary Ánima Kitchent has been acquired by DNEG for $28.8 Million.

The eighth installment to the Leyendas series, La venganza del Charro Negro is slated for theatrical release later in 2026.

== Controversy and shutdown rumors ==
Since 2025, there has been reports of the studio facing a collapse due to hostility and mistreatment of staff, unpaid wages, and controversial decisions made by the management. Unpaid artists, ranging from young to old, have been working for several months without pay. It was originally reported that the studio has shut down operations in July 2026 amid the controversies. However, a spokesperson issued a statement on Cartoon Brew denying the shutdowns, calling them "inaccurate". Additionally, the studio is undergoing "a corporate restructuring and strategic adaptation process," resulting in a temporary pause on animation production and layoffs in order to align with evolving international demand.

== Filmography ==
=== Films ===
- Magos y Gigantes (Wizards and Giants) (2003)
- Imaginum (2005)
- El agente 00-P2 (Agent Macaw: Shaken and Stirred) (2009)
- A Martian Christmas (2009) (direct-to-video)
- Trepsi, Nuny y Wicho - Los Amigos de Trepsi (2009) (direct-to-video)
- AAA, la película: Sin límite en el tiempo (AAA: The Movie) (2010)
- Kung-Fu Magoo (2010) (direct-to-video)
- Gaturro: la película (Gaturro: The Movie) (2010) (co-production as FX and background designs only)
- Don gato y su pandilla (Top Cat: The Movie) (2011)
- La leyenda de la Llorona (The Legend of the Llorona) (2011)
- El Santos vs. La Tetona Mendoza (The Wild Adventures of El Santos) (2012) (under its Átomo Films label)
- Trepsi, Nuny y Wicho - Arriba y Abajo (2012) (direct-to-video)
- La leyenda de las Momias de Guanajuato (Legend of the Mummies) (2014)
- Guardianes de Oz (Guardians of Oz/Wicked Flying Monkeys) (2015)
- Don Gato: El inicio de la pandilla (Top Cat Begins) (2015)
- La leyenda del Chupacabras (The Legend of Chupacabras) (2016)
- Isla Calaca (Monster Island) (2017)
- La leyenda del Charro Negro (The Legend of Charro Negro) (2018)
- Ahí viene Cascarrabias (Here Comes the Grump/A Wizard's Tale) (2018)
- Ana y Bruno (Ana & Bruno) (2018) (co-production only)
- La liga de los 5 (2020)
- Escuela de miedo (Cranston Academy: Monster Zone) (2020)
- El Camino de Xico (Xico's Journey) (2020)
- Las leyendas: el origen (2022)
- La leyenda de los Chaneques (2023)
- Aztec Batman: Clash of Empires (2025)
- La venganza del Charro Negro (2026)

=== Television shows ===
==== Television series ====
- El Chavo Animado (2006–14) (based on El Chavo del Ocho)
- Awesome Magical Tales (2012)
- El Chapulín Colorado (2015–17) (based on El Chapulín Colorado)
- PINY: Institute of New York (2016–17) (produced under Ánima Kitchent)
- Legend Quest (2017) (Netflix original series based on the Leyendas saga)
- Cleo & Cuquin (2018–20) (produced under Ánima Kitchent)
- Space Chickens in Space (2018–19)
- Legend Quest: Masters of Myth (2019)
- Brave Bunnies (2021–present) (produced under Ánima Kitchent and co-produced with Glowberry (all seasons) and WildBrain Studios (season 2))
- Cuquin (2023–present) (produced under Ánima Kitchent and spin off of Cleo & Cuquin)
- Condorito series (TBA) (co-produced with Lunes)
- El Santos series (TBA) (under its adult production label)
- Brutal Nature series (TBA) (co-produced with IDW Publishing)
- Victor and the Infinite & Mysterious Hallway of Loos (TBA) (co-produced with Green Kids Club)

==== Miniseries ====
- Cascaritos (2003–06)
- Poncho Balón (2005–06)
- Espinito (2005–06)
- Bugsted (2013–14) (co-produced with Vodka Capital)

==== Online series ====
- KickOs (2014)
- La Familia Telerín (2015)
- SuperÉpico (2016)
- Mad Dinner (2016)
- Las Crónicas Trol (2017)
- Trepsi Nuny-Wicho (2019)
- Lea & Pop (2019)

=== Video games ===
- Bugsted (2013)
- KickOs (2014)
- Las Leyendas: El pergamino mágico (2017)

=== Shorts ===
- Bugsted (2016) (Theatrical release with La leyenda del Chupacabras)
- What The Quest Is This? (2016) (Television short)
- El Séptimo Caballero (2016) (Television short)
- Cantinflas VR: La máquina del tiempo (2017) (Virtual reality attraction)
- Ram Pam Dam (2018) (Television short)
- El cuervo y el venado (2021)
- Rebeca (2021)

=== Contributions ===
- El Chavo Kart (2014) – Concept art and cutscenes animation.
- Pig Goat Banana Cricket (2015–18) – Animation services; some episodes only.
- Apollo Gauntlet (2016) – Animation services for "Pilot".
- Cupcakery of Doom (2016) – Animation services; short film for the Nickelodeon Animated Shorts Program.
- Tito Lizzardo and Catty B (2020–24) – Animation services; a music project from Sony Latin America and Sony España
- The Great Wolf Pack: A Call to Adventure (2022) - Animation services
- El Guapo vs. The Narco Vampires (2025) - Animation services

== See also ==
- Mexican animation
- List of Mexican animated films
- List of animation studios
