= Imaginum =

2005 Mexican animated sci-fi-comedy film by Alberto Mar and Isaac Sandoval

- Theatrical release poster
- Directed by: Alberto Mar; Isaac Sandoval
- Screenplay by: Francisco Hirata
- Story by: Martinez Vara Adolfo; Jose Carlos Garcia de Letona; Francisco Hirata
- Produced by: Fernando de Fuentes S.
- Starring: Eugenio Derbez; Ilse; Giovanni Florido; Luis Fernando Orozco
- Edited by: Alberto Rodríguez
- Music by: Xavier Asali
- Production company: Ánima Estudios
- Distributed by: Videocine (Mexico); PorchLight Entertainment (International)
- Release date: August 19, 2005
- Running time: 82 minutes
- Country: Mexico
- Languages: Spanish; English
- Budget: $1.5 million
- Box office: MX$7.8 million

Imaginum is a Mexican animated sci-fi comedy film, produced by Ánima Estudios and released in theaters on August 19, 2005.

It features the voices of Eugenio Derbez and Ilse. The film took a total of 18 months to develop, in contrast to other animated films, which take up to 40 months to develop.

The film was later released direct-to-video in the United States on 9 December 2008 in both English and Spanish versions.

The film grossed a total of $7.8 million pesos.

== Plot ==
Yxxxxx is an intergalactic parasite with grandiose delusions, and is highly dangerous to other beings. However, he is currently confined in a mental space. He decides to force three other inmates, who are not exactly an example of prudence, to escape the mental asylum with him. He wants to involve them in his evil plans.

== Cast ==
- Eugenio Derbez as Yxxxxx
- Ilse as Elisa Naranja
- Giovanni Florido as Dante Naranja
- Luis Fernando Orozco as Rocco Naranja

== See also ==
- Mexican animation
- Ánima Estudios
- Magos y Gigantes
