= El agente 00-P2 =

- Theatrical release poster
- Directed by: Andrés Couturier M.
- Screenplay by: Martínez Vara Adolfo; Andrés Couturier M. Alberto Rodríguez; José C. García de Letona
- Story by: Martínez Vara Adolfo; José C. García de Letona
- Produced by: Fernando de Fuentes S.
- Starring: Jaime Camil; Dulce María; Silvia Pinal
- Edited by: Alberto Rodríguez; Federico Unda; Fernando de Fuentes; Jorge Hernández S.
- Music by: Alejandro de Icaza; Gerardo Celada del Castillo
- Production company: Ánima Estudios
- Distributed by: Videocine
- Release date: February 13, 2009
- Running time: 97 minutes
- Country: Mexico
- Language: Spanish
- Budget: $1.8 million
- Box office: MX$22.57 million (US$1.5 million)

El agente 00-P2 (also known as Agent Macaw: Shaken & Stirred) is a 2009 Mexican animated action-spy-comedy film directed by Andrés Couturier and produced by Ánima Estudios. It is the third feature film by Ánima Estudios, as well as the first Mexican animated film starring anthropomorphic animals since the 1984 Mexican-Spanish film Katy the Caterpillar. The film features the voices of Mexican actors Jaime Camil, Silvia Pinal, and Dulce María.

It was released in theaters on February 13, 2009 in Mexico. This film references blockbuster spy films, such as James Bond and Mission: Impossible.

== Synopsis ==
Tambo Macaw, an overweight macaw who works as a janitor at the Central Intelligentus Animalus (CIA) dreams of becoming a secret agent. The opportunity arises when he is assigned, by mistake, the most important mission in the agency's history; stop the wicked plans of Mamá Osa and her evil organization. Tambo is helped by Jacinto Tortugo, an old turtle who is in charge of the technology lab in the agency and is one of Tambo's few friends. The couple journeys into the coolest and craziest adventure ever, which will lead them to faraway places where they'll face weird and dangerous foes. Our heroes will have to use their limited resources —in Tambo's case, his limited intelligence— to save the world from an icy extinction.

== Cast ==
- Jaime Camil as Tambo Macaw, a male macaw
- Dulce María as Molly Cocatu, a female macaw
- Silvia Pinal as Anya Frappe “Mamá Osa”, a polar bear
  - Ana Paula Fogarty as a younger Mamá Osa
- Mario Castañeda as Gino Tutifrutti, a chameleon
- Luis Alfonso Mendoza as Jacinto Tortugo, a turtle
- Rogelio Guerra as Jefe Lipo, a hippo
- José F. Lavat as Yunque, an ox
- Raúl Anaya as General Panzer, an crocodile

== Box office ==
El agente 00-P2 earned $4.4 million pesos ($0.3 million USD) on its opening weekend and grossed a total of $22.57 million pesos (US$1.5 million) during its theatrical run.

== Soundtrack ==
This film features two hit singles, One Way or Another, performed by Blondie, and Summer Fun, performed by The Barracudas.

== See also ==
- James Bond in film
