= Legend Quest (2017 TV series) =

Animated television series

- English logo
- Also known as: Legend Quest: Masters of Myth (season 2)
- Genre: Animation; Adventure; Comedy horror Fantasy; Mystery; Science fiction Action; Suspense; Animated sitcom Slice of life
- Created by: José Alejandro García Muñoz
- Based on: Characters by Ricardo Arnaiz
- Developed by: Jim Krieg; Jose C. Garcia de Letona
- Written by: Jim Krieg
- Voices of: Spanish cast: Benny Emmanuel; Mayté Cordeiro; Andrés Couturier; Ricardo O'Farrill; English cast: Johnny Rose; Annemarie Blanco; Oscar Cheda; Paul Tei; Cydney J. Fam
- Composers: Leoncio Lara; Martin Kucaj
- Country of origin: Mexico
- Original language: Spanish
- No. of seasons: 2
- No. of episodes: 26

Production
- Executive producers: Fernando de Fuentes; José C. García de Letona; Jim Krieg; Diego Avalos; Andy Yeatman
- Producers: Rob Hoegee; Carlos Ramos; Ian Freedman; Hugh Duffy; Alan Resnick
- Running time: 22 minutes
- Production companies: Ánima Estudios; Pipeline Studios

Original release
- Network: Netflix
- Release: February 24, 2017 – October 5, 2019

Legend Quest (released in Latin America as Las Leyendas) is a Mexican animated fantasy comedy-horror television series created for Netflix produced by Ánima Estudios. It is based on the characters created by Mexican animator Ricardo Arnaiz, and is part of the Leyendas animated franchise. This is the streaming network's first original animated series produced in Latin America.

It premiered worldwide on Netflix on February 24, 2017. The series was renewed for a second season which premiered on October 5, 2019, titled Legend Quest: Masters of Myth.

In 2019, CAKE picked up the distribution rights for the series. The series ended on a cliffhanger on October 5, 2019.

== Plot ==
When a gifted teen Leo San Juan, and the inhabitants of his Mexican village are attacked by a host of otherworldly creatures, Leo's ghostly friends Teodora, Don Andres and Alebrije join him in a quest to foil an evil overlord who plans to eradicate mankind from the annals of history. They are aided in their mission by a band of powerful allies—an assortment of legendary creatures from around the world.

== Cast ==
=== English version ===
- Johnny Rose as Leonardo "Leo" San Juan, a 14-year-old boy who is Marcella's boyfriend, and leader of the group. He has the ability to see and speak with ghosts. He is described as being brave, resourceful, honest, and noble of heart. Prior to the encountering evil forces that threaten to destroy the world, he lived in a small Mexican village with his grandmother. In the first episode, he learns that he is destined to be the hero of whom it was foretold: "The Lion will destroy the Serpent." Though he at first refuses to accept his destined role so he can live a normal life, Leo soon embraces himself as a true hero. Leo later also starts to realize Teodora Villavicencio's romantic feelings toward him.
- Oscar Cheda as Don Andrés, the ghost of an old Conquistador; he claims to have been a barber in his corporeal life. His insistence that his former occupation makes him qualified to dispense opinions on medical issues becomes a running gag. Despite being a ghost, he often fears for his safety.
- Annemarie Blanco as Teodora Villavicencio, the spirit of a 17-year-old girl who actually hails from the future, as shown by her modern attire and mobile phone, which contrast with the show's 19th-century setting. It is later revealed that she is not actually dead but rather comatose due to injuries sustained in a truck accident; a mysterious lady subsequently taught her the power of astral projection and advised her that Leo would need her help, prompting Teodora to send herself back through time. Consequently, Teodora possesses some abilities that normal ghosts lack, such as immunity to the power of Medusa and greater skill at manipulating physical objects. She also has a rather fierce rivalry with Marcella. Despite that, she was willing to resuscitate Marcella when she died, possessing her body to perform CPR on herself. Teodora can seem rather selfish and hard-headed at times, but in reality she is a caring, brave, and kind-hearted girl who is willing to risk it all to protect her friends, particularly Leo. In the second season, it's revealed Teodora has gradually been falling in love with Leo, attracted to his bravery and desire to help those in need.
- Paul Tei as Alebrije, a flamboyant, kindhearted yet dimwitted strange creature of various colors who appears in different forms depending on the observer, though always retaining his unique color scheme. His real name is apparently hard to pronounce, so he is simply nicknamed Alebrije by the group. He is portrayed quite differently compared to the films in terms of appearance and personality. Alebrije is portrayed as a comical optimistic character who tries to keep the team together, while also presenting his own knowledge when needed.
- Cydney J. Fam (Season 1); Jenna Lamia (Season 2) as Marcella, an extremely beautiful 16-year-old girl, and Leo's new girlfriend who comes from a family who are accused of being sorcerers. It is eventually revealed that her mother was indeed a sorceress, but one who refused to aid Baba Yaga and Nu Gui in their plans and was thus attacked and left gravely injured; Marcella later inadvertently gained powers from her mother after touching her comatose form. Marcella took it upon herself to care for her mother, eventually coming to Leo's village. She eventually befriended Leo, later falling in love with him and having their first kiss.
- Blanca Bassion as Baba Yaga, an evil witch who initially appears to be in league with Quetzalcoatl but is later revealed to have been enslaved by him; she seeks freedom and vengeance on her "master." She and her comrade Nu Gui attempted to persuade Marcella's mother to join them in their plotting.
- Paul Tei as Friar Godofredo, a Friar who mentored Leo and later informs him of the existence of the Brotherhood, a noble organization dedicated to fighting evils such as Quetzalcoatl.
- Al-Kesne Shaw as Quetzalcoatl, a legendary deity who is described as a force of creation "when he's in a good mood"; he is the series' main antagonist and seeks to destroy the world so that he can remake it. Previously he did so for humanity's benefit, but was then trapped in an alternate dimension, leading him to seek vengeance. He later tricks the heroes in attempting to destroy the Esfera, an egg containing the next Quetzalcoatl, in order to prevent his own demise.
- Lissa Grossman as Abuelita, Leo's grandmother.
- Andrio Chaverra as Thomas Decatur, a New Jersey inventor who becomes one of Leo's allies.
- Gerald Owens as Fenrir, the legendary wolf of Norse mythology who seeks to bring about Ragnarok; he is Quetzalcoatl's ancient rival and seeks to destroy him. He is chained to the world tree Yggdrasil and guards access to it, as it serves to connect all points of space and time.
- Owen Almeida as Akihito, a young Japanese nobleman who is heir to both the magical Sword of Dawn and leadership of the Brotherhood, a noble organization dedicated to thwarting mystical menaces such as Quetzalcoatl. Initially leading a sheltered life that led to his own people despising him, Akihito found the courage to take up his family sword with help from Marcella. The sword enables Akihito to undergo a transformation similar to that of Ultraman, in which he dons a mystical suit of armor and grows to gigantic size.
- Paula Barros as Nu Gui, a Chinese witch and member of Baba Yaga's coven; she was once the daughter of an Emperor, but betrayed him in order to obtain immortality, though the process drove her mad. She is initially contemptuous of Yaga for siding with Quetzalcoatl, but later joins him in Baba Yaga's place; however, like Yaga it is revealed that she serves unwillingly. Barros also provides the voices of Teodora's Mom, Teodora's cellphone, and Akihito's overprotective Vizier.

=== Original voice actor ===
- Benny Emmanuel as Leonardo "Leo" San Juan
- Mayté Cordeiro as Teodora Villavicencio
- Andrés Couturier as Don Andrés
- Ricardo O'Farrill as Alebrije

== Episodes ==
=== Series overview ===
Series overview
Season	Episodes	Originally released
1	13	February 24, 2017
2	13	October 5, 2019

=== Season 1 (2017) ===
The season consists of 13 episodes, all of which were released on February 24, 2017.

No. overall	No. in season	Title	Directed by	Written by	Monster(s)	Original release date
1	1	"The Prophecy"	José Alejandro García Muñoz & José Manuel Balanzario Pérez	James Krieg & Ernie Altbacker	Horroroso	February 24, 2017
Leo's gift for seeing ghosts feels more like a curse. But when his loved ones start turning into zombies, he's the only one who can save them.
2	2	"Jersey Devil"	Marco Aurelio Ibarra Rodríguez	Jonathan Callan	Jersey Devil	February 24, 2017
When a cannon shoots their ship out of the sky, the gang agrees to help an American inventor fight the fire-breathing monster attacking his town.
3	3	"The Mart"	Marvick Eduardo Núñez Aguilera	Eric Carrasco	Mart	February 24, 2017
Leo and friends head to Germany in search of the fabled Brotherhood. Instead, they find a Nicht Mart who delivers bad dreams.
4	4	"Ghost of Medusa"	Rajesh R. Bhavnani & Enrique Ocampo Muñoz	Eric Carrasco	Medusa	February 24, 2017
Leo's compass directs the airship to a desolate Italian town where the locals can see ghosts — including one who turns spirits into stone.
5	5	"Vodnik"	Marco Aurelio Ibarra Rodríguez	Ernie Altbacker	Vodnik	February 24, 2017
While investigating sightings of a strange monster that steals children's souls, Leo and the gang unearth a far more sinister threat.
6	6	"Fenrir"	Rajesh R. Bhavnani & Enrique Ocampo Muñoz	Mark Hoffmeier	Fenrir	February 24, 2017
The team braves a blizzard to find a portal to Queztocoatl's world. But striking a deal with a mythical wolf is the only way through it.
7	7	"Tooth Fairy"	Marvick Eduardo Núñez Aguilera	Jonathan Callan	Backus	February 24, 2017
Stranded without a ship and still missing Alebrije, the gang tumbles into foggy London and uncover a plot that's robbing orphans of their teeth.
8	8	"Kaiju"	José Manuel Balanzario Pérez	Jeremy Adams	Kaiju	February 24, 2017
Desperate to locate the Brotherhood, Leo steers the ship to a Japanese village — and normal rules no longer apply.
9	9	"Nu Gui"	Marco Aurelio Ibarra Rodríguez	Jennifer Muro	Nu Gui	February 24, 2017
In a bid to strengthen their coven, Baba Yaga and the immortal Nu Gui summon Marcella to a cave in China that's crawling with terra-cotta soldiers.
10	10	"Mister Madera"	Rajesh R. Bhavnani	Tim Sheridan	Tsukumogami	February 24, 2017
Soon after Leo brings a creepy-looking doll aboard the ship, members of the team start going missing ... and Leo starts talking to sugar skulls.
11	11	"The Chilan"	José Manuel Balanzario Pérez	Patrick Rieger	Chilan and Baba Yaga	February 24, 2017
Marcella helps Alebrije remember where he lost the Esfera. Turns out, it's back in Mexico, where an undead priest is holding it hostage.
12	12	"Golem"	Marvick Eduardo Núñez Aguilera	Jonathan Callan and Eric Carrasco	Golem	February 24, 2017
When Baba Yaga sends a Golem after one of their own, the gang slips through a portal to the future to save their friend — and the world. Note: This episode is the first of a two-part story.
13	13	"The Serpent and the Egg"	Marco Aurelio Ibarra Rodríguez & José Alejandro García Muñoz	Jim Krieg and Ernie Altbacker	Quetzalcoatl	February 24, 2017
With the future of the world at stake, Leo and the Brotherhood wage an epic war against Quetzalcoatl and his Legions of Evil. Note: This episode is the second of a two-part story, and ends with a memorial to Martha Guadalupe Cuenca Moreno, the wife of show editor R. Edgardo Avalos Cuenca.

=== Season 2: Masters of Myth (2019) ===
The season consists of 13 episodes; all of which were released on October 5, 2019. The series gained a new animation style, small character retcons, and its accompanying subtitle: Masters of Myth.

No. overall	No. in season	Title	Directed by	Written by	Monster(s)	Original release date
14	1	"Powrie"	José Alejandro García Muñoz	Ernie Altbacker and Mark Hoffmeier	Redcap	October 5, 2019
While Leo obsesses about the team's perfect monster hunting record, they're haunted by a powrie, an evil dwarf from Scottish folklore.
15	2	"Efrit"	Fernando "El Hino" Hinojosa	Ernie Altbacker	Efrit	October 5, 2019
Things get hot when Leo and the team confront an ambitious Fire Genie, and Marcella -- his Brotherhood training rival -- has to come to the rescue.
16	3	"Tepe Tree"	Gustavo Cosío Herrera	Mark Hoffmeier	Tepe Tree	October 5, 2019
Leo and friends search for Godofredo, his Brotherhood mentor who's gone missing. While lost in the Madagascar jungle, Teodora begins to have doubts.
17	4	"Caipora"	Hugo Fragoso Blendl	Tim Sheridan	Caipora	October 5, 2019
In Brazil, the team hunts the Caipora, the protector of the jungle. But he tells them a story that shocks Leo and throws the team off course.
18	5	"Tsukumogami"	Sergio Neri	Kevin Burke and Chris "Doc" Wyatt	Tsukumogami	October 5, 2019
Leo and the team are confused by a promotion to Administration. Filing really isn't their thing -- especially when they receive a very special box.
19	6	"Wendigo"	Fernando "El Hino" Hinojosa	Mark Henry	Wendigo	October 5, 2019
The team travels to Canada, following clues that could lead them to Godofredo. Hearing that Leo and the team are dead, Marcella investigates.
20	7	"El Coco"	Gustavo Cosío Herrera	Johnny Hartmann	El Coco	October 5, 2019
It's the world's end -- at least if the traitor to the Brotherhood gets his way. Meanwhile, Leo meets Teodora in the flesh when the team time travels.
21	8	"Gargouille"	Hugo Fragoso Blendl	Mairghread Scott	Gargouille	October 5, 2019
To get Godofredo's journal back, Don Andrés takes on the Gargouille for the Trials of Sophistication. Teodora sneaks in to the first-ever fashion show.
22	9	"Churel"	Sergio Neri	Rebecca Kaminski & John Semper, Jr.	Churel	October 5, 2019
Because the journal is written in high alebrije, the team must get Alebrije's cousin to translate it. Unfortunately, he's working for the other side.
23	10	"Anansi"	Fernando "El Hino" Hinojosa	Joelle Sellner & Sam Sandak Freiberger	Anansi	October 5, 2019
When the team heads to Africa in search of Marcela and her group, they're all trapped by spidery Anansi, who weaves illusions to confuse them.
24	11	"Atlantes"	Paola Velázquez	Patrick Rieger	Atlantes	October 5, 2019
Now that they've discovered the Brotherhood's plans, Leo and the team head to the Pyramid-of the Sun to get the artifact they need to save the world.
25	12	"Rise of the Moon Goddess 1"	Hugo Fragoso Blendl	Tim Sheridan	Chupacabra	October 5, 2019
The team makes it back to the Brotherhood just in time to stop their dastardly plan -- but they're shocked to find a traitor among them!
26	13	"Rise of the Moon Goddess 2"	Christian Mauricio Andrés Pincheira Cabrera & Hugo Fragoso Blendl	Ernie Altbacker and Mark Hoffmeier	Coyolxāuhqui	October 5, 2019
The Moon Goddess is brought back to life. Now the only way for Leo and the team to defeat her… is to work with the monsters they've already defeated.

== Development ==
The series was first announced when Variety reported that a new series based on the Leyendas franchise is being developed for Netflix. "We approached Netflix and knew that the trilogy had been successful in Mexico and Latin America, but we dared to propose to do something much more global and they loved the idea," said executive producer Jose C. Garcia de Letona. Negotiations between Netflix and Ánima Estudios have begun in October 2015. Co-executive producer Fernando de Fuentes was happy with the partnership with the streaming network after the growth of the Mexican animation industry. "We have already worked 15 years in the industry and we are happy to see our work on the Netflix platform, which has collaborated with large companies, and has included Ánima [which] makes us proud," said Fuentes. Fuentes also said that the show is "an important leap" for the franchise and production company Ánima Estudios.

== Release ==
The series premiered on Netflix on February 24, 2017, worldwide in 190 countries and translated into 24 to 30 languages. Producers Fernando de Fuentes and Jose C. Garcia de Letona thought the decision to release the show worldwide in multiple languages is necessary since the country of Mexico, where the show is produced and set, has been receiving more global attention. "The world is talking about Mexico and we are lucky in that sense to be able to talk about our country and its relationship with other nations[,] even if it is through cartoons," said Fernando de Fuentes.

== Reception ==
=== Critical response ===
The show received favorable reviews from critics. Emily Ashby of Common Sense Media gave the series a 4 star rating and said that "the enjoyable show's roots in Mexican folklore is an original concept and could inspire kids' interest in related topics."

=== Accolades ===
Year	Award	Category	Nominees	Result
2018	Quirino Awards	Quirino Award for the Best Ibero-American Animation Series	José Alejandro García Muñoz	Nominated
2020	Leo Awards	Leo Award for Best Sound Animation Program or Series	Humberto Corte, Miguel Araujo, Javier Ivan Perez and Alex Lara	Won

=== Hispanic impact ===
The show has been praised for its positive impact towards the Hispanic culture, which makes numerous nods to the history of Mexico and folklore, as well as the series' worthy educational values, teaching younger Hispanic viewers about the importance of their Mexican roots.

== See also ==
- Animex Producciones
- Ánima Estudios
- La Leyenda de la Nahuala
- La Leyenda de la Llorona
- La Leyenda de las Momias
- La Leyenda del Chupacabras
- La Leyenda del Charro Negro
- Las Leyendas: El Origen
- La leyenda de los Chaneques
