= AAA, la película: sin límite en el tiempo =

AAA – Sin límite en el tiempo
- Film poster
- Directed by: Alberto Rodriguez
- Screenplay by: David Hernández Miranda
- Produced by: Marisela Peña; Dorian Roldán; Fernando de Fuentes; José C. García de Letona
- Edited by: Roberto Bolado Muñoz
- Music by: Leoncio Lara
- Production companies: Promociones Antonio Peña; Ánima Estudios
- Distributed by: Videocine
- Release date: January 22, 2010 (Mexico)
- Running time: 96 minutes
- Country: Mexico
- Language: Spanish
- Box office: MX$7.1 million (US$557,931)

AAA, la película: Sin límite en el tiempo (also known as simply as Triple A and Sin límite en el tiempo) is a 2010 animated action-dramedy film produced by Ánima Estudios and distributed by Videocine. It is a fictionalization of the lucha libre wrestling organization, Lucha Libre AAA Worldwide, and was released in theaters on January 22, 2010.

== Premise ==
In the world of lucha libre wrestling, the feud between Rudos and Técnicos has always existed, but it has never left the ring. One night, La Parka steals the championship from Abismo Negro, which angers him and threatens to end the AAA with the aid of Chessman and Cibernético. With the sudden apparition of a mysterious, former enemy of the AAA; La Parka, alongside Octagón, Gronda, Kenzo Suzuki, Mascarita Sagrada, Faby Apache, and others, get into an adventure that involves an abandoned psychiatric, killer cyborgs, giant dragonflies, legendary warriors, and time travel.

== Cast ==
- César Arias as Dr. Transistor
- Jorge Badillo as Charly Manson
- Manuel Campuzano as Chessman
- Cibernético as Cibernético
- Bruno Coronel as Yónatan
- Sergio Coto as Abismo Negro
- Rolando de Castro as Octagón
- Cinthya de Pando as Elvira
- Carlos del Campo as Casero
- El Elegido as himself
- Eduardo Garza as Mascarita Sagrada
- Andrés Gutiérrez as La Parka
- Jesus Guzman as Kenzo Suzuki
- Marina Huerta as Mamá de Abismo
- Alejandro Mayen as Triple Dragón
- Luis Alfonso Mendoza as Robotito
- El Mesías as himself
- Doctor Alfonso Morales as himself
- Salvador Reyes as Gronda
- Arturo “El Rudo” Rivera as himself
- Alberto Rodriguez as Locutor 70's
- Anette Ugalde as Faby Apache
- Victor Vallejo as Locutor
- Zorro as himself
