= Guardians of Oz =

- Mexican theatrical release poster
- Directed by: Alberto Mar
- Screenplay by: Evan Gore; Jorge R. Gutiérrez; Doug Langdale
- Story by: Jorge R. Gutiérrez
- Produced by: Fernando de Fuentes; José C. García de Letona
- Starring: Héctor Emmanuel Gómez; Susana Zavaleta; Loreto Peralta; Raúl Araiza; Jorge "El Burro" van Rankin
- Edited by: Roberto Bolado
- Music by: Leoncio Lara
- Production companies: Ánima Estudios; Discreet Arts Productions
- Distributed by: Videocine
- Release date: 10 April 2015
- Running time: 86 minutes
- Countries: Mexico; India
- Languages: English; Spanish
- Budget: MX$55 million (US$2.7 million)
- Box office: MX$21.8 million (US$1.22 million)

Guardians of Oz (Spanish: Guardianes de Oz; released internationally as Wicked Flying Monkeys) is a 2015 animated adventure film, directed by Alberto Mar and executive produced by Jorge Gutierrez. The film was produced by Ánima Estudios, Discreet Arts, and distributed by FilmSharks International. The film is the first English-language and flagship CG production for Ánima Estudios, as well as the studio's biggest production and is described as Mexico's biggest animated production. Mexico's take on the early 20th century Wizard of Oz books by L. Frank Baum, it features an original story and new characters, and was released theatrically on 10 April 2015 in Mexico.

It was released direct-to-video on 24 January 2017 in the United States and features the voices of Mikey Bolts, Ambyr Childers, and Jenn McAllister.

== Plot ==
After the Wicked Witch of the West is melted by a bucket of water, and Dorothy is sent back to her world, Glinda, the Good Witch of the South, decides to revive the Wicked Witch and remove her powers by storing them in a magic broom. Glinda then gives the magical broom to Dorothy's friends, Tin Woodman, Cowardly Lion, and Scarecrow, and they become the guardians of the broom.

Evilene, the Wicked Witch, conspires with her Flying Monkeys to retrieve her broom. However, a friendly little monkey named Ozzy forgets to close the gate of the castle and a battle ensues between the flying monkeys and the 'Bums of Oz.' Evilene retrieves her broom and repels the Champions of Oz from the castle. She then punishes Ozzy's father, transforming him into a chicken. Angered by the witch's spell on his father, Ozzy steals the broom from Evilene and runs away from the palace.

Ozzy reaches Glinda to find she has been paralyzed by accidentally drinking a magic potion created by her niece Gabby, who is unable to create an antidote without a vital ingredient based on wood. Gabby and Ozzy set off to find the Champions of Oz. They are pursued by the other Flying Monkeys.

They soon find Cowardly Lion, who is out of sorts due to the witch's spell, but with some effort they guide him to the north town, where they find the Tin Woodman, who is extremely depressed by the spell. The spell-raged Lion smashes the Tin Man to bits, but calms down when Ozzy accidentally hits him with the magic broom.

Ozzy, Gaby, and the Cowardly Lion take the Tin Man's parts to the Library of Oz where (due to the spell) Scarecrow is obsessively reading books in an effort to become more intelligent. He quickly repairs Tin with the help from a clue. However, the group is attacked by the Flying Monkeys, and in the chaos Ozzy cures Scarecrow of the spell's effects, but they are unable to save Gabby from being whisked away by the Flying Monkeys.

The group arrives in Emerald City where the Wicked Witch gives an ultimatum to Ozzy to return the broom. The Guardians of Oz challenge the Witch but they are quickly defeated. Ozzy decides to break the broom in order to remove Evilene's powers for good, and tells the rest of the winged monkeys that they obey Evilene due to their dumb and cowardly mindset. The Monkeys rebel against Evilene who discovers there is some power left in the broom and tries to defeat Ozzy who escapes with a part of the broom. A chase through the streets of Emerald City ends with a crash in the fountain dedicated to Dorothy Gale, and the wicked witch is melted for good.

As the story ends, Glinda breaks Evilene's spell on Ozzy's father and Ozzy learns how to fly on his own, being recognized as a hero by all of Oz.

== Cast ==
=== Spanish cast ===
- Héctor Emmanuel Gómez as Ozzy
- Susana Zavaleta as Eveline
- Loreto Peralta as Gabby
- Raúl Araiza as Yicky
- Jorge "El Burro" van Rankin as Gak

=== English dub cast ===
- Steve Cannon (U.K.) / Mikey Bolts (U.S.) as Ozzy
- Melissa Hutchison (U.K.) / Jenn McAllister (U.S.) as Gabby
- Stephanie Komure (U.K.) / Ambyr Childers (U.S.) as Eveline
- Chuck Kourouklis as Lion
- Jeff Minnerly as Scarecrow
- Dino Andrade as Tin Woodman / Gak

== Production ==
=== Animation ===
The film's animation was done by Discreet Arts Productions in India and co-produced by Ánima Estudios. "We believe the ideal medium for this ambitious story was the use of 3D, hence the effort to use this technique for the first time in one of our movies," said producer Jose C. Garcia de Letona. He also said that the "experience has been very satisfying and we want to repeat it for our next project," which became Top Cat Begins, animated by the same studio.

=== Designs ===
In addition to writing the story, Jorge R. Gutiérrez, along with his wife, Sandra Equihua, have designed the characters. In an interview with Cartoon Brew, he told them that "working with the amazing Mexican artists at Ánima Estudios was a blast! This film is yet another encouraging sign of the endless talent currently brewing in my beloved Mexico."

In 2023, a user tweeted Jorge asking about his experience working on the film, in which he answered "Not very good. The script we wrote was completely rewritten and the character designs we did were for a Flash movie, not CG. This happened after El Tigre and before The Book of Life. Out of respect for all the amazing people on it I have never seen it."

== Release ==
The film's teaser premiered on February 11, 2014. As of 19 May 2014, it has been reported that the film was sold to Top Films Distribution (Eastern Europe), Shooting Star (Middle East) and Cine Colombia (Colombia). With the budget of $55 million pesos ($4.5 million USD), it is the most expensive film produced by Ánima Estudios. The film's official Mexican trailer was released on 16 January 2015. The English-language trailer was released on 1 April 2015. The film was later screened at the 2015 Cannes Film Festival.

The film was released on DVD in the United Kingdom on February 13, 2017, distributed by eOne. It was originally set to be released between in Q4 2015/Q1 2016 before its delay.

Grindstone Entertainment and Lionsgate released this film in the United States on January 24, 2017 in straight-to-video format.

== Reception ==
=== Box office ===
On its opening weekend in Mexico, the film opened at #3, grossing $13.1 million pesos ($0.79 million USD). It has grossed $21.8 million pesos in total.

== See also ==
- List of films about witchcraft
- The Wizard of Oz (disambiguation)
- Ánima Estudios
