= Poncho Balón =

- Genre: Slapstick; Comedy; Adventure
- Created by: Carlos Cuarón; René Castillo; Juan Elias Tovar; Luis Usablaca
- Directed by: René Castillo
- Starring: Humberto Vélez
- Composer: Álvaro Ruiz
- Country of origin: Mexico
- Original languages: Spanish; English
- No. of seasons: 1
- No. of episodes: 31

Production
- Producers: Carlos Cuarón; René Castillo; Fernando de Fuentes; José C. Garcia de Letona
- Running time: 2 minutes
- Production companies: Ánima Estudios; Estación Espacial

Original release
- Network: Canal 5
- Release: June 5 – July 5, 2006

Poncho Balón (also known as Poncho Football in English) is a Mexican animated television short miniseries that ran on Canal 5 during the 2006 FIFA World Cup. It aired for a total of 31 short episodes. The show stars Humberto Vélez as the title character, who is best known for dubbing Homer Simpson in the Spanish-language version of The Simpsons.

The miniseries was a major co-production by Ánima Estudios and Estación Espacial and was created by Carlos Cuarón, René Castillo, Juan Elias Tovar, and Luis Usablaca.

== Plot ==
The plot revolves on a clumsy, dim-witted, anthropomorphic soccer ball, named Poncho, who's trying to achieve his dreams of playing for the 2006 World Cup Final in Germany. As he journeys around the world, he faces a series of shenanigans and failed attempts while reaching to his final destination.

== Broadcast history ==
Poncho Balón is broadcast on the following stations worldwide:

Region	Network(s)
Mexico	Canal 5/TDN
UNASUR	FOX Sports
USA	Univisión
Ecuador	Teleamazonas
Peru	Frecuencia Latina
Colombia	Caracol
Honduras	Canal 11
Guatemala	PCS

== Feature film adaptation ==
Due to successful ratings, co-creators and producers, René Castillo and Luis Usabiaga, have announced that an animated feature film based on the television shorts is in development. The producers also said they wanted to achieve the similar success with Pixar movies and possibly earn an Academy Award nomination with this film. It will be set during the 2014 FIFA World Cup in Brazil. Originally planned for a 2012 and 2014 release, the film was expected to be released sometime in 2015, produced by Kaxan Animation in Guadalajara, produced in English. The film was never released.
