= Roy del espacio =

Lost 1983 Mexican animated film

- Theatrical release poster
- Directed by: Héctor López Carmona; Rafael Ángel Gil; Ulises Pérez Aguirre
- Written by: Héctor López Carmona; Rafael Ángel Gil; Ulises Pérez Aguirre
- Produced by: Héctor López Carmona; Rafael Ángel Gil; Ulises Pérez Aguirre
- Starring: José Chorena; Guillermo Coria; Juan Domingo Méndez; Arturo Férnandez; Patricia Martínez; Rommy Mendoza; Rubén Moya; Salvador Nájar; Esteban Siller; Álvaro Tarcicio; Braulio Zertuche
- Cinematography: Hector Lopez Carmona
- Edited by: Maximino Sánchez Molina
- Music by: Ernesto Cortázar
- Release date: 3 March 1983
- Running time: 63 minutes
- Country: Mexico
- Language: Spanish

Roy del espacio (English: Roy of Space or Roy from Space) is a 1983 Mexican animated science fiction film written, produced and directed by Hector López Carmona, Rafael Ángel Gil and Ulises Pérez Aguirre. Produced from 1979 to 1982, it is one of the first feature-length Mexican animated films ever made. Roy del espacio premiered on 3 March 1983, playing in several theatres in Mexico.

Retrospective reviews of Roy del espacio have referred to it as "an example of artistic ineptitude" and "a real disaster". It was considered a lost film; from which only still images from the film were known to survive. The film remained in this status until 17 November 2025, when boutique distributor Deaf Crocodile announced it was working on the restoration of the film with plagiarized scenes replaced with new animation due to copyright. It was finally released on Blu-ray on 30 September 2026, alongside a Kickstarter campaign.

== Plot ==
The movie follows the titular character Roy, who, along with Dr. Faz and psychologist Elena, travels to a distant planet and faces an evil emperor who wants to conquer the Earth. Upon arriving on Mars, Roy and his friends are captured by Alome’s robots. With the help of Alome’s daughter, the Princess, they manage to escape. Roy takes over a spaceship and, along with Prince Leo, they work together to defeat Alome. The adventure includes robot fights, space battles, and even a bit of romance.

== Cast ==
- José Chorena as Trax
- Guillermo Coria as a soldier
- Juan Domingo Méndez as Trix
- Arturo Fernández as a scientist
- Patricia Martínez as a princess
- Rommy Mendoza as Helena
- Rubén Moya as King Alome
- Salvador Nájar as Roy
- Esteban Siller as Dr. Faz
- Álvaro Tarcisio as Prince Leo
- Braulio Zertuche as a scientist

== Production ==
The original idea for Roy del espacio came from Ulises Pérez Aguirre, with Héctor López Carmona as director and cinematographer. Ernesto Cortázar was the films composer. Production of the film, made mostly by teen non-professional animators, was from 1979 to 1982.

Multiples scenes of Roy del espacio were either of retraced scenes of older works or outright using footage without permission. These included the 1936 Flash Gordon serial and the 1978 Japanese live-action space opera Message from Space.

== Release and reception ==
=== Criticism ===
Roy del espacio premiered in 12 theaters and cinemas in Mexico City on March 3, 1983, but was quickly withdrawn from exhibition due to poor public acceptance. There are no reviews made at the time of its premiere, but retrospective critics classified it as "an example of artistic ineptitude", and called it "a real disaster". The film was also criticized for its excessive use of clichés about science fiction and its low level of animation, with very rudimentary drawings and rough movements; in addition, there were complaints about the plagiarism of Flash Gordon, whose 1936 film serial were traced frames to use them as a basis for Roy's characters and scenes. Previous to the Blu-ray release, the restored version of the film was premiered on 17 September 2026, at Fantastic Fest, in Austin, Texas.

== See also ==
- Turkish Star Wars
- List of rediscovered films
