= Top Cat Begins =

2015 animated film

- Mexican theatrical release poster
- Directed by: Andrés Couturier
- Screenplay by: Jim Krieg; Doug Langdale; Jorge Ramírez-Suárez
- Based on: Top Cat by Hanna-Barbera
- Produced by: Fernando de Fuentes S. José C. García de Letona
- Starring: Raúl Anaya; Mauricio Pérez; Jesús Guzmán; Gerardo Alonso; Mario Filio; Octavio Rojas
- Edited by: Patrick Danse
- Music by: Leoncio Lara Bon
- Production companies: Ánima Estudios; Discreet Arts Productions; Prana Studios
- Distributed by: Warner Bros. Pictures (Mexico and Latin America); Kaleidoscope Entertainment (international)
- Release date: October 30, 2015
- Running time: 90 minutes
- Countries: India; Mexico; United States
- Languages: English; Hindi; Spanish
- Budget: $8 million
- Box office: MX$54.1 million (US$4.6 million)

Top Cat Begins (Spanish: Don Gato: El Inicio de la Pandilla, lit. 'Top Cat: The Start of the Gang') is a 2015 computer-animated comedy film produced by Ánima Estudios and distributed by Warner Bros. Pictures in Mexico, with additional animation and visual effects provided by Prana Studios and Discreet Arts Productions in India. Based on the Hanna-Barbera animated television series Top Cat, it is a prequel to both the series and the previous film, Top Cat: The Movie, taking place before Top Cat met his gang.

The film was released in Mexico on October 30, 2015, where it grossed a total of $54.1 million domestically, underperforming its more successful predecessor. The film was later released in the United Kingdom on May 27, 2016, where it was distributed by Kaleidoscope Film Distribution and Warner Bros. UK, and received a home media release in the United States on September 29, 2017, where it was distributed by Viva Pictures. The film received negative reviews and was a box office bomb, earning a worldwide total of $4.6 million on an $8 million budget.

== Plot ==
While in New York City, Top Cat comes across a cat playing the violin. The cat introduces himself as Benny the Ball, and explains that he is busking in order to make money; Top Cat agrees to help him in exchange for a portion of the profits. In the evening, as Top Cat and Benny prepare to leave, they bump into two orphans attempting to hide stolen cakes from a nearby bakery. Officer Charlie Dibble, a police sergeant, arrives and attempts to arrest the orphans, but Top Cat protects them by lying to Dibble, claiming that they had been with him all day. After Dibble leaves, the orphans ask Top Cat to help them save their orphanage, which is about to be burnt down by a bulldog named Bad Dog. Top Cat agrees to talk to him, but Bad Dog beats him and throws him out on the street.

The next day, Top Cat and Benny pull various scams on New York residents. The New York City Police Department notices their activities, and assigns Dibble to spy on the pair. Later that day, Top Cat and Benny enter an apartment hoping to swindle its residents. When they ring the doorbell, Dibble answers and chases them across the city, but Top Cat and Benny manage to escape. Afterwards, Top Cat and Benny bump into Bad Dog and a group of his associates. They find out that Bad Dog works for Mr. Big, a major crime boss in the city. While Bad Dog and Benny argue, Top Cat switches his bag with that of Bad Dog, and gives the bag to Benny, entrusting him with its safekeeping.

Later that night, Top Cat and Benny meet at the Starlight Club, where they are ambushed by a group of gangsters and captured. The two are confronted by Mr. Big, who reveals that the stolen bag contained diamonds and demands its location. Top Cat offers to show him where the bag is hidden, and Mr. Big sends Bad Dog with him and Benny to collect them. The trio go to Benny's house, where Benny reveals that he has forgotten where he hid the bag. Top Cat tricks Bad Dog by creating a distraction, allowing the two to escape. The next day, Mr. Big's gangsters plaster 'Wanted' posters for Top Cat and Benny across New York, offering a $50,000 reward for their capture, and the duo call Dibble to help them. Dibble escorts them to the train station and purchases tickets for them to travel to his home, suggesting that Granny Dibble will look after them.

Upon arriving, Top Cat and Benny meet Granny Dibble, who forces them to do various chores. While painting the fence, Top Cat is confronted by Choo-Choo, Fancy-Fancy, and Brain, three cats from the circus, and tricks them into performing his chores. Later, Top Cat and Benny go to get ice cream, but are spotted by a gangster, who alerts Bad Dog. Bad Dog arrives at Granny Dibble's house with a group of gangsters and attacks Top Cat and Benny, who escape and flee to New York. The two argue in frustration, and Benny ultimately leaves.

When Benny arrives home, he finds that his mother has sold the stolen diamonds to The Starlight Club, and decides to steal them back. He sneaks into the club disguised as a singer and takes the diamonds, but is exposed before he can escape. Top Cat and Dibble arrive at the club but are unable to stop Mr. Big's thugs from capturing Benny. Dibble tells Top Cat to leave New York and travel to Florida, where he will be safe. At the airport, however, Top Cat decides to stay and rescue Benny. He returns to New York and recruits Choo-Choo, Fancy-Fancy, Brain, and a pizza cat named Spook to help him rescue Benny.

The next day, Spook delivers Top Cat and the diamonds to Mr. Big in exchange for Benny, while Fancy disguises himself as Top Cat and leads a mob of onlookers hoping to claim the reward money for capturing him into Mr. Big's hideout. In the ensuing confusion, Top Cat escapes, and the angry mob turns on Mr. Big, who climbs up a chain to escape. Top Cat cuts the chain and sends Mr. Big plummeting to the ground, where he is captured by police and sent to prison. The next day, Top Cat apologizes to Benny and tells his gang to meet him at Hoagy's Alley. He initially decides to bury Mr. Big's diamonds underneath the alley, but changes his mind and gives them to the two orphans. Top Cat's gang then ends the film by singing his original theme song.

== Voice cast ==
- Jason Harris Katz as Top Cat/Choo-Choo/Brain
- Chris Edgerly as Benny the Ball
- Diedrich Bader as Bad Dog
- Darin De Paul as Mr. Big
- Bill Lobley as Officer Charlie Dibble
- Dave Boat as Chief Thumbton
- Charlie Adler as Granny Dibble
- Matthew Piazzi as Fancy-Fancy
- Lauri Fraser as Mrs. B
- Benjamin Diskin as Spook
- Marieve Herington as Panther
- Joey D'Auria as Rat
- Patty Mattson as Furletta Duchat

Additional voices include David Shaughnessy, Nick Shakoour, Steve Blum, Grey DeLisle, Diane Michelle, Rachael MacFarlane, Pamela Chollet, Jim Ward, G. K. Bowes, Sean Kenin, and Sue Boyajian.

== Production ==
Following the success of the first Top Cat film, Ánima Estudios began development of another movie based on the Hanna-Barbera property, which would portray the character's origin story. The original Top Cat cartoon, which ran on ABC from 1961 to 1962, was popular in Latin America due to the show's well-received Spanish dubbing and translation.

Due to initial difficulties in re-acquiring the rights to the Hanna-Barbera property, which had lapsed following the completion of the 2011 film, Top Cat Begins was stuck in development for 10 months. Producer Jose C. Garcia de Letona called the film "a work of persuasion and persistence" and stated that Ánima Estudios demonstrated they "knew and understood the character" in finishing and releasing the movie.

Andrés Couturier, who earlier directed Kung-Fu Magoo, a film adaptation of Hanna-Barbera property Mr. Magoo, was hired to direct the prequel film. Couturier stated that he had grown up watching the original cartoon, and that the character had influenced him. "Some people say that the Don Gato in this movie looks a lot like me... I think I look a lot like him because my whole childhood was very influenced by the character, so I worked with a character who was with you during all your childhood, [which] is incredible," said Couturier.

=== Animation ===
Unlike the previous film, which was animated in 2D with Adobe Flash, Top Cat Begins was animated entirely with computer animation. Animation production was handled by Discreet Arts Productions in India, which had previously collaborated with Ánima Studios to animate and produce Guardians of Oz. Additional animation production services were provided by Prana Studios in Mumbai, India. The animation process was described an 'important' step for the entire company. Garcia de Letona claimed that, despite the studio's interest in 2D animated productions, they hoped to reach a wider distribution market by switching to computer animation. "[It's] a style that catches the attention of distributors," he said.

Rafael González, the film's art director, described the process of transitioning the film's production to computer animation while preserving the character of the original series as a "challenge." González, who had also worked on the preceding film, was not familiar with the original cartoon at the time, but knew of its popularity in Latin America and the United States. "I did not watch the series at the time... I knew it was broadcast, but I think it was very small," he said. González also added that he "had a great opportunity in the first film... I had to do conceptual art, which is a great pride. I did not live in that era of Don Gato, so it was my turn when interest opened with the new film and now, with 'Don Gato, El Incio de la Pandilla', we are trying to present a new version for the new generations."

=== Writing ===
The film's screenplay was written by James Krieg (known for writing the Scooby-Doo television series), Doug Langdale, and Jorge Ramírez-Suárez. To help the plot match the premise of the original cartoon, Warner Bros. Animation played a role in the film's writing process. The movie included references to Hanna-Barbera characters Snagglepuss and Hair Bear, as well as multiple Hollywood productions, including Psycho and Reservoir Dogs.

=== Casting ===
For the English version of the film, Jason Harris Katz, the voice of Top Cat and other characters from the first film, announced that he would reprise his role as the same character via Twitter . It was later announced that voice actors Chris Edgerly, Bill Lobley, Hope Levy, and David Hoffman had also joined the cast.

=== Soundtrack ===
The film's soundtrack was composed by Leoncio Lara, who also served as the music director of the previous film. The soundtrack was Lara's second collaboration with Couturier.

== Release ==
The film's Mexican release trailer premiered on 1 July 2015. A second trailer was released on 14 September 2015. The film was released on 30 October 2015 in Mexico by Warner Bros. Pictures Mexico, and scheduled for a wider release in Latin America later that year.

The film's English-language trailer was released on 8 March 2016. On 27 May 2016, Top Cat Begins was released in the United Kingdom by Kaleidoscope Film Distribution and Warner Bros. Pictures UK. "We are very excited to be working with Ánima Estudios [by] bringing this latest chapter of Top Cat to a worldwide audience," said Spencer Pollard, the chief executive officer of Kaleidoscope. "As a leading global animation brand, we're looking forward to T.C. and his friends hitting [the] screens everywhere in 2016."

=== Box office ===
On its opening weekend in Mexico, Top Cat Begins debuted at No. 3 with a gross of $18.1 million pesos ($1.09 million USD),, falling short of its predecessor's box-office performance. The film was a major box-office bomb in the United Kingdom, debuting at No. 15 on its opening weekend with a gross of £60,000 ($100,000 USD) behind X-Men: Apocalypse and Alice Through the Looking Glass.

=== Home media ===
The film was released on DVD in the United States on 10 October 2017 by Viva Pictures.

=== Reception ===
The film received mostly negative reviews, with critics panning the writing and the quality of the animation. On Rotten Tomatoes, the film has a rating of 14%, based on 7 reviews, with an average rating of 2.90/10.

Peter Bradshaw of The Guardian gave the film a 1/5 rating while criticizing the "badly animated" movie's "unfunny escapades". Carlos Del Río of Cine Premiere gave the film a 1-star rating, writing that it "fails to approach the spirit and humor of the TV series." Tom Huddleston of Time Out described the film as "one of the most annoying, tedious, lazy and unpleasant filmgoing experiences in recent memory" in his negative review.

A more positive review came from Eddie Harrison of The List, who gave the film a 3/5 rating and wrote, "The feline favourite returns for a likeably familiar, knockabout animation... director Andrés Couturier's film wisely scales things down as it attempts to get back to the comedic values of its source material."

== See also ==
- Top Cat
- Top Cat: The Movie
- Ánima Estudios
- List of films based on Hanna-Barbera cartoons
