= Dino Andrade =

American voice actor (born 1963)

- Born: Dino S. Andrade; September 16, 1963 (age 63); San Bernardino, California, U.S.
- Other name: K.C.D. Shannon
- Occupation: Actor
- Years active: 1995–present
- Spouse: Mary Kay Bergman (m. 1990; died 1999)
- Children: 1
- Website: www.dinoandrade.com

Dino S. Andrade (born September 16, 1963) is an American voice actor in video games and animated projects. He manages dual careers as both a voice actor and the creator, owner and operator of the geek dating/community website SoulGeek.com.

== Early life ==
Andrade was born to Mexican parents. He is the first-born son of José Roberto Andrade (1924–2000) and Gloria Esther (née Mendez) Andrade (1924–1997). His father was serving in the United States Air Force at the time of Dino's birth. The family moved to McGuire Air Force Base in New Jersey where Dino spent the first five years of his life before his father left the armed services and the family returned to California. Andrade has one sister, Sabrina, born, six years later to the day, on September 16, 1969. He says that his love of all things science fiction, horror and fantasy is lifelong and in his blood. He has been quoted saying, "I was that guy in acting class that, while everyone was reading Mamet and O'Neill, I was reading Batman comics," thus attributing his love of animation and graphic storytelling to making his career in voice acting the natural choice for him.

== Career ==
Andrade started as an actor on stage and doing comedy improvisation, having been trained at the Groundlings by the actors Mindy Sterling and Julia Sweeney. His official start in voice over work happened when he drove a friend and fellow actor to an audition to do some background looping on the 1985 feature film Girls Just Want to Have Fun (film), starring the then unknowns Sarah Jessica Parker and Helen Hunt. He was asked if he would like to audition as well and was hired for the film. From this, he was recommended to the director Steve Miner who was doing post-production on the horror/comedy film House, starring William Katt, George Wendt and Richard Moll. Though not credited in the final release, Andrade was hired to do the creature sounds of the demons that kidnap a child that Katt's character has to rescue. He continued in voice acting and acting in general until the early 1990s when he left acting to pursue independent film making. Around 2002, Andrade returned to acting with a focus on voice acting training and has been in voice acting ever since.

== Personal life ==
Andrade was married to the voice actress Mary Kay Bergman until her struggle with mental illness led to her suicide. Andrade has become active in raising mental health awareness and plans to launch the Mary Kay Bergman Project, a mental health outreach program for artists and entertainers. He has since remarried and has one child with his spouse.

Andrade has an interest in science fiction, horror, fantasy and animation. He was inspired to create SoulGeek.com, a geek dating and community website. The site was launched in July 2007.

== Filmography ==
=== Voice roles ===
==== Video games ====
- World of Warcraft - Gelbin Mekkatorque, male Gnome NPCs
- World of Warcraft: The Burning Crusade - Gelbin Mekkatorque, Millhouse Manastorm
- World of Warcraft: Wrath of the Lich King - Gelbin Mekkatorque, Male Death Knight Gnome NPCs, Mimiron, Wilfred Fizzlebang, Krick, Professor Putricide
- World of Warcraft: Cataclysm - Gelbin Mekkatorque, Millhouse Manastorm, Fungalmancer Glop, Ensign Ebert, Twilight Servant
- World of Warcraft: Mists of Pandaria - Gelbin Mekkatorque, Amber-Shaper Un'sok, Xaril the Poisoned Mind
- World of Warcraft: Warlords of Draenor - Gelbin Mekkatorque
- World of Warcraft: Legion - Gelbin Mekkatorque, Millhouse Manastorm, Tinkmaster Overspark, Mimiron
- World of Warcraft: Battle for Azeroth - Gelbin Mekkatorque, Tinkmaster Overspark, Mimiron
- World of Warcraft: Shadowlands - Gelbin Mekkatorque, Millhouse Manastorm
- Sengoku Basara: Samurai Heroes (2010) - Kenshin Uesugi
- Brütal Legend (2009) - The Reaper & Hairbangers
- Batman: Arkham Asylum (2009) - The Scarecrow and various inmates
- Nerf N-Strike Elite (2009) - The Patrolbots
- Tales of Vesperia Xbox 360 (2008) - Ragou
- Guitar Hero: On Tour (2008)
- Call of Duty: Roads to Victory PSP (2007)
- Pocket God Fishmas Special (2010) - Klik
- Batman: Arkham Underworld IOS (2016) - The Scarecrow
- Prey (2017) - Kaspar
- Shenmue III (2019) - Additional Cast
- Trials of Mana (2020) - Death Eater
- Deadly Premonition 2: A Blessing in Disguise (2020) - Chuck Thompson
- Minecraft Legends (2023) - Blaze Runt, Mace Runt
- Frip and Froop's Logical Labyrinth DX (2025) - Dr. Frip

==== Animation ====
- Saint Tail (2001) (English dub)
- Ghost in the Shell: Stand Alone Complex (2002) (English dub)
- Wolf's Rain (2004) (English dub)
- Hellsing Ultimate - Wild Geese (Ep. 3, 6), British Officers (Ep. 5), Helicopter Pilot (Ep. 8) (English dub)
- Revisioned: Tomb Raider (2007) Rodrigo, Moctezuma (Ep. "Revenge of the Aztec Mummy")
- Martin (2007) - Martin - pilot show
- Oishi High School Battle (2012) - Floating Butthole, Jerry, One Eyed Racist Squirrel
- PvP: The Series (2007) - Skull the Troll
- Ring Force Five (2008) - Morae - pilot show
- A Martian Christmas (2008) - Zork, Dwight (Credited as K.C.D. Shannon)
- The Five Senses (2011) - The Old Dude, The Bus Dude
- A Turtle's Tale 2: Sammy's Escape from Paradise (2012) - Manuel Hogfish
- Prince of Atlantis (2012) - Officer Sanchez/Chico
- Jingle and Bell's Christmas Star (2012) - Mover Guy 1
- Sofia the First (2015) - Flinch (Ep. "The Fliegel Has Landed")
- Shimmer and Shine (2015) - Male Elf (Ep. "Santa's Little Genies")
- Mutafukaz (2017) - Willy (English Dub)
- New Looney Tunes (2018) - Speedy Gonzales
- Kamlu (in production) - Mangli
- Hanazuki: Full of Treasures (2018–2019) - Enormous Coal
- The Last Prince of Atlantis (2018) - Dockworker, Young Deckhands
- The Loud House (2019, 2022) - Busker, Audience Member, Passerby #2
- The Queen's Corgi (2019) - Charlie, Pollux
- Playmobil: The Movie (2019) - Scurvy Pete
- Dia de Muertos (2019) - Julian
- El Camino de Xico (2021) - Tiacuache (English dub)
- Bidoof's Big Stand (2022) - Additional Bidoof
- Chickenhare and the Hamster of Darkness (2022) - Barry
- JoJo's Bizarre Adventure: Stone Ocean (2022) - Yo-Yo Ma (English dub)
- My Dad the Bounty Hunter (2023) - Karl

==== Other voice-overs ====
- House (1985) - Voice of the Little Critters
- Doing Life (1986) - Various inmates
- Great Family Getaways: Orlando (2008) - Narrator
- $#*! My Dad Says (2010) - Voice of Shatner at age 17
- 2009: A True Story (2008) - Mayor of Los Angeles, Chief Network Executive
- Kevin Costner's The Explorer's Guild (2008) - Father Russeau (series villain)

=== Live-action ===
- The Trials of Rosie O'Neill (1990) - Actor
- Hulk Hogan's Rock 'n' Wrestling (1985) - Sketch comedian
- Girls Just Want to Have Fun (1985)
- Knights of the City (1986)
- Fast & Furious (2009) - Scratch

=== Production credits ===
- Bob's Video (1999) - writer, director and co-executive producer
- Pumpkin Man (1998) - writer
