= Aztec Batman: Clash of Empires =

2025 animated film by Juan Meza-León

- Mexican theatrical release poster
- Spanish: Batman Azteca: Choque de Imperios
- Directed by: Juan Meza-León
- Screenplay by: Ernie Altbacker
- Story by: Ernie Altbacker; Juan Meza-León
- Based on: Batman by: Bill Finger; Bob Kane
- Produced by: José C. García de Letona; Fernando De Fuentes; Daniel Stellan Kendrick; Carina Schulze; Aaron Berger; Jim Krieg; Kimberly S. Moreau
- Starring: Horacio García Rojas; Omar Chaparro; Álvaro Morte
- Edited by: Diego Denardi
- Music by: Ego Plum
- Production companies: Warner Bros. Animation; DC Entertainment; Ánima; Chatrone; Particular Crowd
- Distributed by: Cinépolis Distribución (Mexico; through Universal Pictures); Warner Bros. Home Entertainment (Home media)
- Release dates: September 18, 2025 (Mexico); September 19, 2025 (United States)
- Running time: 89 minutes
- Countries: United States; Mexico
- Language: Spanish
- Box office: $663,244

Aztec Batman: Clash of Empires (Spanish: Batman Azteca: Choque de Imperios) is a 2025 adult animated historical superhero film based on the DC Comics character Batman. It is a collaboration between Ánima, Chatrone and Warner Bros. Animation, with Juan Meza-León as director and writer. The film was released in Mexican theaters by Cinépolis Distribución on September 18, 2025 and in North America by Warner Bros. Home Entertainment on September 19, 2025.

== Plot ==
The father of Yohualli Coatl, a young Aztec boy, is murdered by Spanish conquistadors. As an adult, Coatl is a priest in the court of King Moctezuma II and works with his fellow clerics in the temple of Tzinacan to defy the Spanish invaders and protect their people using the masked persona of the "Batman".

== Cast ==
- Horacio García Rojas as Yohualli Coatl / Batman, a privileged boy born into the nobility of the Aztecs and whose life crumbles when Spanish conquistador Hernán Cortés murders his father. As a man, he takes on the persona of "Batman", a masked warrior who fights for justice and to exact revenge on Cortés, while concealing his true nature behind the facade of a simple priest. Jay Hernandez voices the role in the English dub.
- Jorge R. Gutiérrez as Toltecatzin, a variant of Thomas Wayne; a village leader and father of Yohualli Coatl, who was killed by Cortés.
- José Carlos Illanes as Pedro de Alvarado, a variant of Azrael; Cortez's right-hand man who is driven by strange voices in his head urging him to deliver "justice".
- Teresa Ruiz stars as Jaguar Woman, a jaguar themed variant of Catwoman; a virtuous thief dressed in the guise of an animal spirit, who initially steals for selfish purposes before willingly choosing to help Batman.
- Omar Chaparro as Yoka / Joker, formerly a respected priest until he hears the voice of Tezcatlipoca losing to Huitzilopochtli while telling him to honor the gods with human sacrifice, causing him to lose his sanity and disfigure himself. Raymond Cruz voices the role in the English dub.
- Álvaro Morte as Hernán Cortés / Two-Face, the conquistador aiming to conquer Tenochtitlan for gold. Arrogant and greedy, he survives an attempt on his life by Jaguar Woman that leaves one side of his face permanently scarred and compulsively flips a scratched gold doubloon to decide the fates of his victims.
- Maya Zapata as Forest Ivy, a variant of Poison Ivy; a vicious demi-goddess of nature who crafts a body of plants to seek revenge on the Spanish for despoiling her jungle.
- Roberto Sosa as Acatzin, a variant of Alfred Pennyworth; a wise old temple caretaker who secretly assists Batman in crafting his weapons and gathering intelligence.

== Production ==
=== Development ===
On June 13, 2022, at the Guadalajara International Film Festival, HBO Max Latin America announced that production on the film had begun. The first collaboration of Ánima and Warner Bros. Animation, the film is directed by Juan Meza-León and produced by Anima's José C. García de Letona and Fernando De Fuentes. The film is based on Batman-centric characters and is completely produced in Mexico. Sam Register and Tomás Yankelevich served as executive producers, while Alejandro Diaz Barriga served as a cultural consultant.

Some reviewers said that the collaboration between Warner Bros. Animation and Latin American companies is likely "one of many", noting that HBO Max Latin America is aiming to "release 50–70 Latin America-branch originals" by 2023. In June 2022, Horacio García Rojas was cast as Yohualli/Batman. By September 2022, Aaron D. Berger and Carina Schulze joined the film's production team.

=== Writing ===
The filmmakers did extensive research on Aztec culture, including how building structures were made and the meaning of colors in Aztec culture, in order to incorporate them into the film. Director Juan Meza-León said the filmmakers aimed to be as faithful to Aztec culture as possible while also incorporating elements from the Batman mythos, being a fan of the comics himself. In order to accomplish this, they hired Dr. Alejandro Barriga as consultant, as, being both an expert on Aztec culture and a comic book fan, "understood" the team's intention to combine both elements.

Meza-León compared the film to an "Elseworlds" comic book, and said that, as such, they wanted to incorporate "the spirit of vengeance and trying to turn tragedy into motivation for good" he felt was inherent to Batman Elseworlds stories. He also decided to have the film's version of Batman to be inspired by the Aztec bat god Tzinacan in order to incorporate both elements of Aztec culture as well as "that element of mystery, the spookiness, the darkness, to it that Batman has". Poison Ivy was also reimagined as an Aztec deity so that she could serve as an introduction to the more mythical elements of Aztec culture.

=== Music ===
Ego Plum composed the film's score, which incorporates elements of Danny Elfman's theme from Batman (1989). According to Plum, the theme was incorporated with Elfman's approval; the filmmakers wanted to incorporate part of the theme into the score in order to "make [audiences] feel that it's part of the [Batman] world, yet it's its own thing at the same time".

== Critique of Spanish colonialism ==
The trailer of the film produced a debate in the Spanish-speaking world regarding the possible perpetuation of the anti-Spanish "Black Legend", in which the Spanish Empire is portrayed as uniquely atrocious. This has led to discussion about how the film might raise awareness about the ongoing historical legacy of the Spanish conquest of the Aztec Empire.

== Release ==
Aztec Batman: Clash of Empires was released in Mexican theaters by Cinépolis Distribución on September 18, 2025.

== Reception ==
=== Box office ===
Aztec Batman: Clash of Empires has grossed $648,067 in Mexico, and $15,177 in Colombia, for a worldwide total of $663,244.

== Future ==
Director Juan Meza-León expressed interest in developing a continuation that explores "more of that detective side of Batman".
