= A Martian Christmas =

- U.S. DVD cover
- Directed by: José Alejandro García Muñoz
- Screenplay by: Linda Miller; Alex Mann; John Behnke; Rob Humphrey
- Story by: Linda Miller; Alex Mann
- Produced by: Jose C. Garcia de Letona
- Starring: Cindy Robinson; K.C.D. Shannon; David Lodge; Mac Grave; Robert Mark Klein; Katie Leigh; Dave Mallow
- Edited by: Sean Stack
- Music by: Guy Michelmore
- Production companies: Porchlight Entertainment; Ánima Estudios; Telegael
- Distributed by: Porchlight Home Entertainment
- Release date: November 10, 2009
- Running time: 45 minutes
- Countries: United States; Mexico; Ireland
- Language: English

A Martian Christmas is a Mexican-American-Irish sci-fi Christmas animated film, released direct-to-video on November 10, 2009. The film was produced by Ánima Estudios, Porchlight Entertainment and Telegael. The film was directed by José Alejandro García Muñoz.

Although it was described as a "television movie", there is currently no further information about the film's air date or network.

== Synopsis ==
Elementary school kids are at a school putting up decorations for the Christmas holidays. While doing so, they get a strange visit. A band of Martians (and their dog Rover) drop down and are fascinated by what these bizarre Earthlings are doing. They start asking the kids all sorts of questions about the holiday which the kids answer. The thing that gives the Martians the most fascination is the singing which the students end up teaching them.

As friendships start developing within the cast, Darph Meanie (the Martin spaceship commander) scolds the Martians for not having freeze-dried the Earthlings. Their original reason for having dropped into Earth was to pick up fuel (snow) for their spaceship, which the elementary school kids happily give them. This culminates in a celebration of Christmas at the end of the film, with both the people of Earth and the Martians taking part.

== Cast ==
- Cindy Robinson as Kip, Mary Kate
- K.C.D. Shannon as Zork, Dwight
- David Lodge as Gleeb, Santa Claus, Martian Leader
- Mac Grave as Ned, Drang, Martian Scientist
- Robert Mark Klein as Office Manager, Martian Officer
- Katie Leigh as Roxy
- Dave Mallow as VOX, Shopper

== Production ==
On 6 October 2008, The Hollywood Reporter reported that A Martian Christmas is in development from Porchlight Entertainment and Ánima Estudios. Post-production services was handled by Telegael.

== Reception ==
Sierra Filucci of Common Sense Media gave this film 2 out of 5 stars and said, "Unfortunately the build-up to the main part of the story -- the journey to Earth -- takes so long and is packed with so much backstory that kids and even adults might get lost, or just bored. Once the trip begins, things pick up and it's sort of interesting to see humans and Christmas from outsiders' eyes." Whoever IMDb gives a score of 8.1.

== Release ==
This film was released on DVD on 11 November 2009 by PorchLight Home Entertainment. Due to its obscurity, it remains one of the rarest films to this day, most likely due to lack of promotion, and the fact that this film was primarily produced in Mexico, as it is difficult for a Mexican animated production to get into the United States market, according to producer Fernando de Fuentes. The DVD of the film is only available on online shopping sites, such as eBay and Amazon.com.

== See also ==
- List of Christmas films
