= Cleo & Cuquin =

Children's animated television series

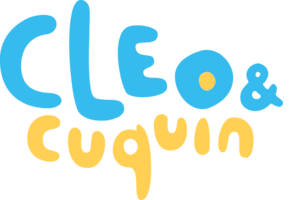
- Genre: Preschool
- Created by: Víctor M. López
- Countries of origin: Spain; Mexico
- Original languages: Spanish; English
- No. of seasons: 3
- No. of episodes: 107

Production
- Executive producers: Víctor M. López; Ángel Molinero; Rubén Zarauza; Chíty Moro; Chedey Reyes; José A. Cerro; Fernando de Fuentes; José Carlos García de Letona
- Running time: 7-9 minutes
- Production companies: Ánima Kitchent; Televisa; MAI Productions; Selecta Visión

Original release
- Network: Clan
- Release: January 7, 2018 – June 24, 2020

Cleo & Cuquin, known in Latin America as Cleo & Cuquin: Familia Telerin, is a Spanish preschool animated television series produced by Ánima Kitchent in cooperation with Televisa for RTVE. The show is based on characters from Familia Telerín created by José Luis Moro Escalona, who also appeared in the animated movie The Dream Wizard. The show debuted in Spain on Clan on January 7, 2018. The series known as "Cuquin" began airing in 2023.

The series follows an eight-year-old girl named Cleo and her infant brother named Cuquin as they help their other siblings solve the problems they encounter. At the end of each episode, Cleo uses the lessons learned from them to help her determine what she wants to be when she grows up.

== Characters ==
=== Characters ===
- Cleo is the oldest of six siblings and is eight years old. Her favorite thing in her world is playing, and with her vivid imagination, she turns everything into an adventure.
- Cuquin is the youngest male of the family, being an infant. He is an adorable young scamp, a tireless, playful baby who just won't sit still.
- Colitas is the youngest female of the family. She is three years old. She has a big heart and loves to share everything with Cleo, she is empathetic, optimistic and a huge nature lover.
- Pelusin is the artist of the family. He is five years old. He is easygoing, creative and very sensitive.
- Maripi is six years old and a fashionista who wears pink. She loves playing dress-up and being the center of attention.
- Tete is a bookworm, intelligent, and a bit of a know-it-all who loves to read, study and learn new things... and then show off about how much he knows. He is seven years old.

== Production ==
Development for Cleo & Cuquin was announced in February 2016, when Ánima Kitchent, the Madrid-based European production arm of Mexican animation studio Ánima Estudios, had partnered with Televisa to bring the children's brand Telerín Family back to the small screen with Ánima Kitchent's co-founder & Jelly Jamm co-creator Victor M. Lopez serving as creator for the new series.

== Broadcast ==
The series began airing on January 7, 2018, on the Clan in Spain and on January 22, 2018, on the Nick Jr. Channel in the United States. It premiered on the Discovery Kids channel in Latin America on March 5, 2018, and on Netflix worldwide and premiered on Treehouse TV in Canada on April 2, 2018. On July 1, 2023, the show was removed from Netflix.

== Merchandise ==
The show has merchandising agreements with toy partners with Fisher-Price, Mattel and book partners. In 2019, Toy Plus was named as master toy licensee for the brand. The series known as "Cuquin" part of "Mexican Animation".
