= PorchLight Entertainment =

American animation and live-action studio

PorchLight Entertainment, Inc.
- Industry: Film production Animation; Television production Live-action
- Founded: February 20, 1995; 31 years ago
- Founders: Bruce D. Johnson; William T. Baumann
- Defunct: 2018; 8 years ago
- Fate: Acquired by Trilogy Animation Group
- Successor: Foxfield Entertainment
- Headquarters: 578 Washington Blvd. Suite 214, Marina del Rey, Ca. 90292
- Area served: Worldwide
- Number of employees: 10
- Parent: PorchLight Worldwide, Inc.
- Divisions: PorchLight Pictures; PorchLight Home Entertainment

PorchLight Entertainment, Inc. was an American animation and live-action production company founded in 1995 by Bruce D. Johnson and William T. Baumann. It focused on the development & production of television series in both live action and animation formats, as well as content for film and home video.

== History ==
PorchLight Entertainment began operations on February 20, 1995. The company was founded by Bruce D. Johnson, a former employee of Hanna-Barbera, and former Taft Broadcasting employee William T. Baumann. One of its major projects was acquiring the rights to adapt Adventures from the Book of Virtues for television. The project was later picked up by PBS, which ordered it to series.

In 1997, while on the virtue of its own successful programming, it would spend $10 million on expanding its own programming activity, while announcing plans to produce made-for-TV movies. In 1998, it launched a motion picture division, PorchLight Pictures, which specialized in motion picture distribution.

In 2000, it bought the international film, TV and distribution rights to the motion picture Heartwood. In 2001, it signed a deal with Columbia TriStar Home Entertainment to distribute titles based on Jay Jay the Jet Plane. In 2004, it was acquired by their senior management and Beringea through Global Rights II, through its parent company, PorchLight Worldwide, Inc.

In July 2010, Germany-based Beta Film GMbH announced that it would acquire the rights to the live-action film catalogue of PorchLight Entertainment.

In 2011, Bruce D. Johnson, one of PorchLight's co-founders, started Foxfield Entertainment.

In 2018, PorchLight Entertainment's animated library, including Tutenstein and Jay Jay the Jet Plane, was acquired by Trilogy Animation Group, with the aforementioned shows subsequently made available for streaming online on the Trinity Broadcasting Network-owned Christian streaming service Yippee TV.

== Filmography ==
Animation

- 64 Zoo Lane
- A Martian Christmas
- Adventures from the Book of Virtues
- Animalia
- Cedric
- The Eggs
- Four Eyes!
- Gofrette
- Jay Jay the Jet Plane (CGI)
- JetCat
- Kid Paddle
- LeapFrog
- The Haunted Pumpkin of Sleepy Hollow
- The Night Before Christmas: A Mouse Tale
- The Secret Saturdays
- Tutenstein

Live-action

- Night of the Twisters
- Born Champion
- Pope Dreams
- I Downloaded a Ghost
- Rain

== Porchlight Home Entertainment ==
PorchLight Home Entertainment was a home video distributor and subsidiary of PorchLight Entertainment which released content on DVD and Blu-ray in the United States.

=== History ===
PorchLight Entertainment announced the formation of PorchLight Home entertainment on June 26, 2007, announcing that their first two planned releases would be A Tad of Christmas Cheer and A Christmas Carol for Annie.

On April 24, 2008, PorchLight launched a Christian content sub-label called PorchLight INSPIRE. On May 5, the company announced it would the Blu-ray market. The company launched another label later on in the year – Ocean Park Home Entertainment – for independent film acquisitions.

In August 2009, PorchLight appointed Canada-based E1 Entertainment as the distributor for their products. Following this deal, PorchLight Home Entertainment went dormant, with their last planned release, Broken Hill, planned originally for a Summer 2010 release, instead being released by Entertainment One in 2011.

=== Releases ===
Products released by the subsidiary were either existing content from PorchLight's content library or third-party acquisitions.

- Adventures from the Book of Virtues
- Jay Jay the Jet Plane
- LeapFrog

==== Acquired ====
- 64 Zoo Lane
- Animalia
- Boowa & Kwala
- FARMKIDS
- Funky Valley
- Funky Town
- Grizzly Tales for Gruesome Kids
- The Lampies
- Little Leaders
- Loopdidoo
- Zakland

==== Film Acquisitions ====
- Dear Me, a Blogger's Tale
- Together Again

== See also ==
- LeapFrog
