= Brave Bunnies =

Ukrainian children's television series

- Genre: Children's animation
- Developed by: Glowberry
- Written by: John Van Bruggen
- Directed by: Tim Fehrenbach
- Creative director: Olga Cherepanova
- Countries of origin: Ukraine; Spain; Mexico (season 1); United Kingdom (season 1); Canada (season 2)
- Original language: Ukrainian
- No. of seasons: 2
- No. of episodes: 104

Production
- Executive producers: Sergey Molchanov; Fernando De Fuentes; José C. García De Letona; Angel Molinero; Miguel Aldasoro
- Running time: 7 minutes
- Production companies: Glowberry Books; Ánima Kitchent (Note: The series is produced by Spanish studio Ánima Kitchent, with first season also produced by Mexican studio Ánima Estudios.); Aardman Animations (season 1); WildBrain (season 2)

Original release
- Network: PlusPlus
- Release: 5 December 2020 – 2025

Brave Bunnies (Ukrainian: Хоробрі зайці, romanized: Khorobri zaitsi) is a Ukrainian children's animated television series for preschool children aged 2 to 5. In the series, two rabbit children show their courage when they meet and befriend other animals. Creator Olga Cherepanova sought to encourage respect for diversity and to promote healthy childhood development.

The series premiered in December 2020 and has been broadcast in more than 80 countries. It is produced by Glowberry, Ánima Estudios, and WildBrain. WildBrain acquired a majority ownership of the property after production of the second season was interrupted by the Russian invasion of Ukraine. Distribution of the first season was by Aardman Animations and the second season by WildBrain.

== Synopsis ==
The 2D animated series follows the adventures of a family of rabbits: Boo and Bop, Ma and Pa, and four Bunny Babies. Every episode starts with a cheerful song as the family ride on their bunny bus, which stops at a new location. Brother Bop and sister Boo then explore and make friends with a different animal, creating a new game to play with them. The series attempts to show its preschool viewers the diversity of the world and to accept the differences of others. Starting in the second season, some episodes have the bunny family revisit friends at their homes, meeting their families and learning more about their different lifestyles.

The series introduces children to the concept of diversity and, through the example of the Brave Bunnies, shows how to accept and communicate with people possessing different appearances and behaviours. To promote healthy childhood development, characters Bop and Boo acknowledge the uniqueness of each new friend.

== Voice cast ==
The Ukrainian voice cast includes actress Olena Kravets and singer-songwriter Potap, which 1+1 Media stated was the first time a Ukrainian children's animated series attracted such high-profile performers.

- Narrator – Chetna Pandya (English dub)
- Bop – Wilbur Conabeare (English dub)
- Boo – Margot Powell (English dub)
- Bunny Ma – Olena Kravets (Ukrainian), Harriet Kershaw (English dub)
- Bunny Pa – Potap (Ukrainian), Jensen Adeyanju (English dub)

== Development and production ==
Publishing house Glowberry was founded in 2009 and worked in children's literature and illustration, seeking to create modern fairy tales. Their best-selling work was a picture book about a family of rabbits on a journey, meeting unusual animals as they travelled further from their home. Several years were spent developing this into a television series for children aged 2 to 5. Glowberry co-founder and series creator Olga Cherepanova noted that while rabbits are often considered to be timid animals, their bravery in the series comes from discovering new challenges every day. She said that she created the series "to help children ... communicate with different friends without any fears or stereotypes, respecting the diversity of our world."

Illustrator Anna Sarvira (Note: Sarvira was twice included in the list of top animators at the Bologna Children's Book Fair.) developed the style for the series, serving as art director while Cherepanova was the creative producer. Following this early creative work, the production became an international project to ensure funding, market access, and expertise. Over a hundred people in different countries were involved, coordinating together on the same schedule. This included British director Tim Fehrenbach and Canadian lead writer John Van Bruggen, both of whom had experience in children's animation. Cherepanova was educated in psychology, and the writing team consulted with child psychologists throughout the process. They sought to maintain the interest of young children, present stories that would aid early socialisation, and create characters representing the many different human personality types. The music which celebrates the characters' achievements in each episode was composed in Ukraine.

In 2019, the series was in development with Glowberry and Ánima Kitchent (the Spanish subsidiary of Mexico-based animation studio Ánima). The production also received support from the Ukrainian State Film Agency and the Ministry of Youth and Sports. Glowberry pitched the series to studios and distributors at MIPCOM in 2019. By early 2020, UK studio Aardman Animations had partnered as the international distributor and secured additional international sales at the 2020 Kidscreen Summit in Miami. The first season consisted of 52 seven-minute episodes.

When the full-scale Russian invasion of Ukraine began in February 2022, the production of Brave Bunnies in Kyiv was suspended. Many of the Glowberry team were forced to flee Kyiv, and production coordinator Natalia Yermak became a war correspondent for the New York Times. Production resumed in August and by December 2022, Canadian children's entertainment company WildBrain became a majority stakeholder in Brave Bunnies, to continue the reliable production and distribution of the series. WildBrain took over global distribution of the series, merchandising and licensing, and the company's Vancouver animation studio joined Glowberry and Ánima Kitchent (Note: For the second season, Ánima Kitchent used their studio at Las Palmas in the Canary Islands.) to produce the second season of 52 episodes.

== Release ==
=== Broadcast ===
The series premiered on 5 December 2020 on PLUSPLUS in Ukraine, followed by Nick Jr. (UK), Super RTL (Germany), ABC (Australia), Yle (Finland), and HOP! (Israel). The first season was distributed by Aardman Animations, and by 2022 had been broadcast in over 80 countries.

Brave Bunnies streamed on the Sunflower TV YouTube channel, which launched in July 2022 and allowed Ukrainian refugees across Europe and the UK to watch ad-free children's programming in the Ukrainian language. Content was approved by a panel of media professionals, child psychologists and Ukrainian mothers. The creators of Brave Bunnies along with partner companies waived their rights to enable the project.

It is broadcast on WildBrain's Family Jr. channel in Canada and on the Comcast WildBrain+ SVOD channel in the United States. The second season was released in Canada in June 2023 followed by other territories later that year.

=== Reception ===
Brave Bunnies was among the top-rated children's programs in Ukraine, the UK, Israel and Australia. The New Voice of Ukraine applauded its message of diversity and acceptance. A 2020 focus group by British research agency Childwise found that 79% of children aged 3 to 5 felt happier after watching the series, and 90% liked the characters.

== Books and merchandising ==
Glowberry first distributed its books through the company's tablet app. Following the launch of the TV series, various publishers were licensed to print physical books for Brave Bunnies, beginning with Italian-language editions by Planeta Libre in 2021. English-language editions were published by Penguin Random House imprint Ladybird Books. These children's books include picture books (board books), colouring books, activity books, and sticker books.

Canadian multinational toy company Spin Master created a line of toys for the franchise. The toy line includes figures, playsets, games, and plushies.

Story books:

- Elliot, Rachel (2022). Brave Bunnies Spring to the Rescue (picture book). London: Ladybird Books. p. 29. ISBN 9780241490198. OCLC 1295100877.
- Elliot, Rachel (2022). Brave Bunnies Make a Friend (board book). London: Ladybird Books. p. 16. ISBN 9780241490174. OCLC 1354852548.
- Вечірка з орігамі [Origami Party] (in Ukrainian). Ranok. 2024. p. 24. ISBN 9786170985507.
- Гра з пушинками [Playing with Fluff] (in Ukrainian). Ranok. 2024. p. 24. ISBN 9786170985514.
- Осіння колискова [Autumn Lullaby] (in Ukrainian). Ranok. 2024. p. 24. ISBN 9786170985521.
- Чудові розваги [Wonderful Entertainment ] series:
  - Захопливі забавки [Exciting Games] (in Ukrainian). Ranok. 2024. p. 24. ISBN 9789667615499.
  - Пізнавальні подорожі [Educational Journeys] (in Ukrainian). Ranok. 2024. p. 24. ISBN 9789667615482.
  - Уперед до пригод [Onward to Adventure] (in Ukrainian). Ranok. 2024. p. 24. ISBN 9789667615505.
  - Цікаві мандрівки [Interesting Journeys] (in Ukrainian). Ranok. 2024. p. 24. ISBN 9789667615468.

Hardcover collections (Ukrainian: Колекція історій):

- Подорож Зайцесвітом [A Journey through the Bunny World] (in Ukrainian). Ranok. 2024. p. 60. ISBN 9786170988737.
- Пригоди хоробрих друзів [Adventures of Brave Friends] (in Ukrainian). Ranok. 2024. p. 60. ISBN 9786170988744.
- Стрибай у пригоди [Jump into Adventure] (in Ukrainian). Ranok. 2024. p. 60. ISBN 9786170988720.

Sticker books:

- Five Mile Press series:
  - In the Jungle. Australia: Five Mile Press. 2022. p. 16. ISBN 9781922677136.
  - In the Mountains. Australia: Five Mile Press. 2022. p. 16. ISBN 9781922677471.
  - Sticker Story Time. Australia: Five Mile Press. 2022. p. 24. ISBN 9781922677464.
- Stories with Stickers (Ukrainian: Історії з наліпками):
  - Магія кольорів [The Magic of Colours] (in Ukrainian). Ranok. 2024. p. 16. ISBN 9786170985538.
  - Музика дощу [Music of the Rain] (in Ukrainian). Ranok. p. 16. ISBN 9786170985552.
  - Нічний гість [Night Guest] (in Ukrainian). Ranok. 2024. p. 16. ISBN 9786170985545.
  - Перший сніг [The First Snow] (in Ukrainian). Ranok. 2024. p. 16. ISBN 9786170985569.
  - У кого м'яч? [Who Has the Ball?] (in Ukrainian). Ranok. 2024. p. 16. ISBN 9786170985583.
  - Шеф – кухарі [The Chef is the Cook] (in Ukrainian). Ranok. 2024. p. 16. ISBN 9786170985576.
- Mazes with Stickers (Ukrainian: Лабіринти з наліпками):
  - Захопливі пригоди [Exciting Adventures] (in Ukrainian). Ranok. 2024. p. 12. ISBN 9786170989918.
  - Пізнавальні розваги [Educational Entertainment] (in Ukrainian). Ranok. 2024. p. 12. ISBN 9786170989925.
  - Пригодницькі шляхи [Adventure Paths] (in Ukrainian). Ranok. 2024. p. 12. ISBN 9786170989901.

Colouring books (Ukrainian: Кольоровий БУЛЬ):

- Jumbo Colouring Book. Australia: Five Mile Press. 2022. p. 48. ISBN 9781922677129.
- Знайомство з Зайцедрузями [Meet the Bunny Friends] (in Ukrainian). Ranok. 2023. p. 12. ISBN 9789667512804.
- Пригоди Хоробрих Зайців [Adventures of Brave Bunnies] (in Ukrainian). Ranok. 2023. p. 12. ISBN 9789667512811.
- Хоробрий Зайцесвіт [The Bunny World] (in Ukrainian). Ranok. 2023. p. 12. ISBN 9789667512781.
