= Bugsted =

Bugsted is a transmedia entertainment brand created by Vodka Capital, Televisa Consumer Products and Ánima Estudios. The property includes mini-series of videos (13 episodes), video games and related toys.

== Miniseries ==
Bugsted
- Genre: Comedy; Action; Slapstick
- Created by: Víctor M. López; Pepe Sánchez; Juancho Carrillo
- Written by: Pepe Sánchez; Jaime Morales; Javi Salvador; Ángel Cotobal; Nuria Roca
- Directed by: Pepe Sánchez
- Composers: Agustín Mejías; Alex Mejías; Marcos Mejías
- Countries of origin: Spain; Mexico
- No. of seasons: 1
- No. of episodes: 13

Production
- Executive producers: Víctor M. López; Rubén Zarauza
- Producers: Carolina Matas; Ángel Molinero; Bruno Muniesa
- Running time: 60-90 seconds
- Production companies: Vodka; Televisa Home Entertainment; Ánima Estudios

=== Plot ===
Bugsted was an ordinary bug that was accidentally taken to the Moon with the 1969 Apollo 11 mission, and then left behind when the astronauts left. Hidden away on the dark side of the Moon, Bugsted developed a unique survival mechanism: spontaneous cloning. Each new challenge Bugsted faced resulted in a new clone to handle the situation. Before long, the dark side of the Moon was inhabited by a whole community of Bugsteds.

In September 2012, a space probe collecting Moon samples accidentally brought a Bugsted back to Earth. That stressful, unexpected journey trapped in the space module triggered his defense mechanism, leading to the arrival of hundreds of Bugsteds on our planet. Stranded on Earth, they make it their mission to return to the Moon.

=== Technical features ===
- Format: 13 episodes of 60–90 seconds each
- Genre: Comedy
- Target: 8–12 years
- Technique: 2D and 3D CGI

=== Characters ===
The main characters of the series are Uab get the back to the Moon and Skills Vertigo, Montana, Emo, Jummpa, Panzer, Bommba, Juanito, Mole, Bubble, Missile, Tornado, Sharky and Quaka. They can't live without each other but they also can't help being selfish and playing pranks on each other constantly. The different phases of the moon change their personality for better or worse. These three friends don't speak but they can communicate through noises, gestures and actions.

- Emo: On the Moon he was a party animal but when he got to Earth and discovered the twilight saga, he became totally fascinated with the emo universe, and he turned into a very introspective guy. He's the smartest and that's why he's the leader even if he is not looking for it.
- Vertigo: She's madly in love with Emo, though he doesn't return her feelings. She faints every time he touches her.
- Montana: This Bugsted is the ultimate looker. He can bulldoze obstacles with his quarterback skills.

=== Episodes ===
Episode	Synopsis
1. Bug rocket	Jab devise a plan to try to go back home to the Moon using a huge firecracker. This attempt will trigger a domino effect of unpredictable and disastrous consequences.
2. Bubble moon	Jab Chewing bubble gum tries to get Moon and destroying the Earth and Moon
3. Tex Mex	Jab stares at a Mexican tortilla thinking it's his beloved Moon. His eagerness to reach it will lead him to end up inside a burrito ... and into the stomach of the man who eats it.
4. Houston, we have a problem	The Jab have finally achieved their goal. Aboard a space module very similar to that used by Neil Armstrong in 1969, they have managed to land on the lunar surface ... or so it seems.
5. Extreme challenge	Driving his Bug car, Jab will try to get to the Moon by using a giant ramp full of traps. It will be a sensational stunt, worthy of the most spectacular shows in the world ... or maybe.
6. Bugenstein	After drinking too much soda, Jab lets out such a burp that his soul comes out of his body. While his spirit flies freely towards the Moon, try to bring him back to life.
7. Art attack	Jab gives free rein to his artistic side and begins to carve an ice sculpture depicting what he loves most in the world: the Moon. taste his work in a peculiar way.
8. Minigolf	This time, the Jab confuse the Moon with a huge golf ball, which is the minigolf's funfair symbol. After several attempts to reach it, the Jab end up destroying the city.
9. Abbugction	What at first seems to be the bright and longed-for Moon, turns out to be just an UFO which ends up abducting Jab. has to do his best to rescue his friends.
10. The fly	The Jab try to get to the Moon with a sophisticated cannon and using Jab as a human cannonball. But when they are about to shoot him, a tiny fly shows up and ruins their plan.
11. Too late	The Jab try to send to the Moon, using a giant spring, but delay the launching so much, that finally the day comes and Jab ends up scorched by the Sun.
12. Tsunami	The Jab have a spaceship ready to go home, but due to a mechanical failure they can't start the engine. When it finally manages to take off, the three of them are already out of the rocket.
13. Bugrace	All Jab compete against each other in a crazy car race to see who will be the first to cross the finish line... The winner will jump into a rocket that will take him to the Moon... maybe...

== Spin-off film ==
Announced at MipTV, a feature film spin-off is reportedly in development.
