= Luis Alfonso Mendoza =

Mexican actor and director (1964–2020)

- Born: Luis Alfonso Mendoza Soberano; 20 November 1964; Mexico City, Mexico
- Died: 29 February 2020 (aged 55); Mexico City, Mexico
- Occupation(s): Voice actor, voice director, announcer
- Years active: 1979–2020
- Spouse: Lourdes Adame
- Children: Nayeli Mendoza
- Relatives: Ricardo Mendoza (brother); Jorge Adame (brother-in-law); Rocío González (sister-in-law); Monserrat Mendoza (niece); Ricardo Mendoza Jr. (nephew); Itzel Mendoza (niece); Gerardo Mendoza (nephew)

Luis Alfonso Mendoza Soberano (20 November 1964 – 29 February 2020) was a Mexican voice actor, voice director and announcer.

== Career ==
He was mainly known for being the voice in the Latin American Spanish dub of teenage and adult Gohan in Dragon Ball Z, Dragon Ball GT and Dragon Ball Super, Daniel LaRusso in The Karate Kid saga, Count Duckula in the series of the same name, Leonardo in the Teenage Mutant Ninja Turtles franchise, Kon in Bleach, Carlton Banks in The Fresh Prince of Bel-Air (where he made his directorial debut), the voice of Bugs Bunny from 2003 to 2020, Joey Tribbiani in Friends, Sheldon Cooper in The Big Bang Theory, Phil Miller in The Last Man on Earth, Ditto and Octagon Vreedle in Ben 10, and Luis in Ant-Man and Ant-Man and the Wasp.

== Murder ==
On 29 February 2020, Luis Alfonso Mendoza, aged 55, was killed in a murder–suicide in Mexico City at 604 Balboa Street. The actor was accompanied by his wife, fellow voice actress Lourdes Adame, and his brother-in-law, Jorge Adame, who were also killed in the same incident.

According to local media, the incident was due to "a quarrel for a property" with the attacker, José Mario Chen Martínez. Such quarrel allegedly involved the building where Mendoza's dubbing academy ArtSpot is located. Mendoza and the Adame siblings rented the place in 1995 to found ArtSpot; however, the conflict began when the building's owner died. Chen Martínez assured that he was supposed to have inherited it, which was not possible due to the lack of a testamentary document that would have proved it. In the meantime, he sued Mendoza and the Adame siblings of real estate lease and making apocryphal documents to strip him of his property. Thus, on 29 February 2020, after years of quarreling without a case winner, Chen Martínez committed the crime, firing nine shots, before shooting himself in the head. He initially failed in this suicide attempt, but died four hours later at the Xoco Hospital, aged 52.
