= List of Flash animated films =

This list of Adobe Flash animated films consists of animated feature and/or TV films produced in Adobe Animate (formerly Adobe Flash Professional, Macromedia Flash, and FutureSplash Animator). It is organized by the year of release.

== Flash animated feature films ==
Year	Title	Country	Length (minutes)	Studio(s)	Notes
1999	Puss in Boots	United States	75	Phil Nibbelink Productions / Allumination / Plaza Entertainment	Animated by a single person.
2000	Blue's Big Musical Movie	United States	78	Paramount Home Entertainment / Nickelodeon Animation Studio / Out of the Blue Enterprises	
2002	The Powerpuff Girls Movie	United States	70	Cartoon Network Studios / Warner Bros. Pictures	used Adobe Photoshop (backgrounds), and ToonBoom (characters in hand-drawn traditional animation)
2003	Magos y Gigantes	Mexico	84	20th Century Fox International Releasing / Ánima Estudios	
2004	House of Bloo's	United States	90	Cartoon Network Studios	used Adobe After Effects, Adobe Animate and Adobe Illustrator
2004	¡Mucha Lucha!: The Return of El Maléfico	United States, Canada, Mexico	70	Warner Bros. Animation / Fwak! Animation	
2005	The Golden Blaze	United States	94	Urban Entertainment	
2005	Imaginum	Mexico	82	Ánima Estudios	
2005	Xuxinha and Guto against the Space Monsters	Brazil	85	Warner Bros.	
2006	Queer Duck: The Movie	United States	71	Icebox.com / Disgrace Films	
2006	Romeo & Juliet: Sealed with a Kiss	United States	72	Indican Pictures / Phil Nibbelink Productions	used Adobe Animate and Moho
2006	Good Wilt Hunting	United States	60	Cartoon Network Studios	used Adobe After Effects, Adobe Animate and Adobe Illustrator
2006	Re-Animated	United States	78	Cartoon Network Studios / Renegade Animation / Turner Studios	combines live action and animation
2007	Turma da Mônica: Uma Aventura no Tempo	Brazil	80	Walt Disney Studios Motion Pictures International	
2007	Chilly Beach: The World is Hot Enough	United States	72	March Entertainment	
2007	Christmas Is Here Again	United States	74	Screen Media Films / Easy to Dream Productions / Renegade Animation	
2007	The Chosen One	United States	79	X-42 Productions LLC	
2008	Sita Sings the Blues	United States	82	Nina Paley	
2008	Wubbzy's Big Movie!	United States	77	Bolder Media	
2008	Waltz with Bashir	Israel	86	Sony Pictures Classics	
2008	Destination: Imagination	United States	65	Cartoon Network Studios	used Adobe After Effects, Adobe Animate and Adobe Illustrator
2009	The Powerpuff Girls Rule!	United States	21	Cartoon Network Studios	
2009	El Agente 00P2	Mexico	93	Videociné / Ánima Estudios	
2009	Wow! Wow! Wubbzy!: Wubb Idol	United States	44 (TV version); 93 (DVD version)	Bolder Media	
2009	The Princess and the Frog	United States	97	Disney / Walt Disney Animation Studios	used Adobe Photoshop (backgrounds) and Toon Boom Harmony
2009	Boogie	Argentina	82	Illusion Studios	
2010	AAA, la película: Sin límite en el tiempo	México	96	Ánima Estudios	
2010	The Drawn Together Movie: The Movie!	United States	70	Six Point Harness / Comedy Central	used Toon Boom and flash animation
2010	Kung-Fu Magoo	United States, Mexico	80	Ánima Estudios / Classic Media	
2011	Top Cat: The Movie	Mexico, Argentina	90	Warner Bros. International / Illusion Studios / Ánima Estudios	
2011	Eva from Argentina	Argentina	75	Azpeitia Cine / Illusion Studios	
2011	La Leyenda de la Llorona	Mexico	75	Videociné / Ánima Estudios	
2012	Ernest & Celestine	France	79	La Parti Productions / Les Armateurs	
2012	Krishna Aur Kans	India	120	Reliance Entertainment	
2013	Cheech & Chong's Animated Movie	United States	84	20th Century Fox	
2013	Jay & Silent Bob’s Super Groovy Cartoon Movie	United States	64	Phase 4 Films / SModcast Pictures / View Askew Productions	
2013	My Little Pony: Equestria Girls	United States, Canada	73	Hasbro Studios / Shout! Factory / The Hub / Screenvision / DHX Media	used Adobe After Effects, Adobe Animate and Adobe Photoshop
2013	Dick Figures: The Movie	United States	74	Six Point Harness / Mondo Media / Remochoso	
2013	Metalocalypse: The Doomstar Requiem	United States	46	Titmouse, Inc. / Williams Street	
2013	Moshi Monsters: The Movie	United Kingdom, Ireland, South Korea	81	Mind Candy (company) / Spider Eye Productions	
2013	Asphalt Watches	Canada	94	Shayne Ehman and Seth Scriver	
2013	Anina (film)	Colombia, Uruguay	78	Raindogs Cine / Palermo Animación / Antorcha Films	
2014	My Little Pony: Equestria Girls – Rainbow Rocks	United States, Canada	73	Hasbro Studios / Shout! Factory / The Hub / Screenvision / DHX Media	used Adobe After Effects, Adobe Animate and Adobe Photoshop
2014	La Leyenda de las Momias	Mexico	83	Ánima Estudios	
2014	Team Hot Wheels: The Origin of Awesome!	United States, Canada	77	Mattel Inc. / Mercury Filmworks / Universal Pictures Home Entertainment	This film used Adobe After Effects, Adobe Photoshop, Autodesk Maya (3D animation), and Toon Boom Harmony (2D animation)
2015	Pirate's Passage	Canada	88	Martin's River Ink / PiP Animation Services / Tandem Communications	
2015	Xinnian is Coming – Uproar of Chuxi	China	80	Tianjin Binhai Xinqu Guoshi Jingwei Media Co., Ltd / Beijing Guoshi Jingwei Science And Technology Co., Ltd / Lasai Guoshi Jingwei Media Co., Ltd / Chengdu Guoshi Jingwei Media Co., Ltd / Tibet Audio-Video Publishing House	
2015	My Little Pony: Equestria Girls – Friendship Games	United States, Canada	72	Hasbro Studios / Shout! Factory / Discovery Family / DHX Media	used Adobe After Effects, Adobe Animate and Adobe Photoshop
2015	Team Hot Wheels: The Skills to Thrill!	United States	45	Mattel Inc. / Titmouse, Inc.	
2015	Team Hot Wheels: Build the Epic Race!	United States	45	Mattel Inc. / Titmouse, Inc.	
2015	Long Way North	France	81	Sacrebleu Productions / Maybe Movies / France 3 Cinéma	used Adobe After Effects, Adobe Animate, Adobe Photoshop.
2015	Half-Shell Heroes: Blast to the Past	United States	44	Nickelodeon Animation Studio / Titmouse Inc.	used Adobe After Effects, Adobe Animate, Adobe Photoshop
2016	My Little Pony: Equestria Girls – Legend of Everfree	United States, Canada	73	Hasbro Studios / Shout! Factory / Discovery Family / DHX Media	
2016	Nerdland	United States	83	AKW Worldwide / Pariah / Samuel Goldwyn Films / Titmouse, Inc.	
2016	The Legend of Shankhadhar	Nepal	55	Yantrakala Studios Pvt Ltd	
2017	The Night Is Short, Walk on Girl	Japan	93	Science Saru	
2017	Lu Over the Wall	Japan	107	Science Saru	Used Adobe Animate
2017	The Big Bad Fox and Other Tales...	France	79	StudioCanal / Folivari / Panique! Production	
2017	Next Door Spy	Denmark	77	Copenhagen Bombay / TriCoast Entertainment	
2017	Lila's Book	Colombia	76	Fosfenos Media / Palermo Animación	
2017	My Little Pony: The Movie	United States, Canada	99	Lionsgate / Allspark Pictures / DHX Media	Used Toon Boom Harmony (2D animation) and Autodesk Maya (3D animation)
2017	Virus Tropical	Colombia, Ecuador	97	Timbo Estudio / Ikki Films	
2017	Team Hot Wheels: Search for the 5th Driver!	United States	22	Mattel Inc. / Titmouse, Inc.	
2018	La Leyenda del Charro Negro	Mexico	85	Videocine / Ánima Estudios	
2018	The Angel in the Clock	México	90	Fotosíntesis Media	
2018	Teen Titans Go! To the Movies	United States	84	Warner Bros. / Warner Bros. Animation / DC Entertainment / Copernicus Studios / Bardel Entertainment	used Adobe After Effects, Adobe Animate, Adobe Photoshop and Toon Boom Harmony
2019	Ride your Wave	Japan	94	Science Saru	
2019	Rocko's Modern Life: Static Cling	United States	45	Netflix / Nickelodeon Animation Studio / Joe Murray Studio (uncredited) / Yeson Entertainment, Inc. (animation services)	used Adobe Photoshop (backgrounds), and Toon Boom Harmony (characters in hand-drawn traditional animation).
2019	Invader Zim: Enter the Florpus!	United States	71	Netflix / Nickelodeon Animation Studio / Renegade Animation (retake consulting) / Maven Image Platform / Sunwoo Entertainment (animation service) / Screen Novelties (puppets scene)	used Adobe After Effects, Adobe Animate, Adobe Photoshop, Autodesk Maya, Dragonframe, Pencil and Paper, Toon Boom Harmony, Toonz and TVPaint
2019	Teen Titans Go! vs. Teen Titans	United States	77	Warner Bros. Home Entertainment / Warner Bros. Animation / DC Entertainment	used Adobe After Effects, Adobe Animate, Adobe Photoshop, Autodesk Maya, Toon Boom Harmony and Toonz (original characters)
2019	Alice-Miranda Friends Forever	Australia	83	SLR Productions	
2020	Masameer: The Movie	Saudi Arabia	110	Netflix / Myrkott Animation Studio / Vox Cinemas	
2020	Calamity, a Childhood of Martha Jane Cannary	France, Denmark	85	Maybe Movies / Noerlum / Studios2 minutes	used Adobe After Effects, Adobe Animate, Adobe Photoshop.
2020	We Bare Bears: The Movie	United States	70	Cartoon Network Studios	
2020	La liga de los 5	México	89	Ánima Estudios	
2020	Xico's Journey	México	83	Ánima Estudios	
2021	Arlo the Alligator Boy	United States	92	Titmouse, Inc. / Netflix Animation	used Adobe After Effects, Adobe Animate and Toon Boom Harmony.
2021	The Loud House Movie	United States	87	Netflix / Nickelodeon Animation Studio / Nickelodeon Movies	used Toon Boom Harmony with the look of hand-drawn animation
2021	Hilda and The Mountain King	United States / United Kingdom / Canada	85	Netflix / Silvergate Media	
2022	My Big Big Friend - The Movie	Brazil	77	O2 Play / 2DLab	
2022	Las leyendas: el origen	Mexico	85	Ánima	
2022	Rise of the Teenage Mutant Ninja Turtles: The Movie	United States	82	Nickelodeon Movies / Netflix / Nickelodeon Animation Studio	used Toon Boom Harmony with the look of hand-drawn animation
2022	Night at the Museum: Kahmunrah Rises Again	United States, Canada, China	80	21 Laps Entertainment / Atomic Cartoons / Alibaba Pictures / Disney+	
2023	La leyenda de los Chaneques	Mexico	89	Ánima	
2023	Toopy and Binoo: The Movie	Canada	83	Sphere Films / Echo Media / Singing Frog Studio / HHA Animation Inc. (animation service)	used Adobe After Effects and Adobe Animate
2024	The Casagrandes Movie	United States	85	Nickelodeon Movies / Netflix / Nickelodeon Animation Studio	used Toon Boom Harmony with the look of hand-drawn animation
2024	No Time to Spy: A Loud House Movie	United States	81	Nickelodeon Movies / Nickelodeon Animation Studio / Paramount+	used Toon Boom Harmony with the look of hand-drawn animation
2025	Masameer Junior	Saudi Arabia	72	Netflix / Myrkott Animation Studio	

== Non-Flash films that utilized Flash ==
Year	Title	Country	Usage	Length (Minutes)	Studio(s)
1999	South Park: Bigger, Longer & Uncut	United States	Opening credits (created with traditional animation and After Effects)	81	Paramount Pictures / Warner Bros. / Comedy Central Films
1999	Fantasia 2000	United States	Beethoven's Symphony No. 5 sequence	75	Disney / Walt Disney Feature Animation
2001	Cats & Dogs	United States	Ancient Egypt sequence	83	Warner Bros. / Village Roadshow Pictures
2001	Monsters, Inc.	United States	Opening sequence and ending credits (created with traditional animation and After Effects)	92	Disney / Pixar
2002	Ice Age	United States	Manny's flashback	81	20th Century Fox / 20th Century Fox Animation / Blue Sky Studios / Blue Sky Studios
2002	Jonah: A VeggieTales Movie	United States	The Peas' imagination sequence	83	Big Idea Entertainment / F·H·E Pictures
2003	The Cat In The Hat	United States	DreamWorks Pictures, Universal Pictures, and Imagine Entertainment 2D animation creations / Opening sequence	82	DreamWorks Pictures / Universal Pictures / Imagine Entertainment
2004	The Incredibles	United States	Ending credits	115	Disney / Pixar
2005	Nanny McPhee	United States / United Kingdom	Ending credits	99	Universal Pictures / Metro-Goldwyn-Mayer / StudioCanal / Working Title Films
2006	Curious George	United States	Additional animation / Ending credits	90	Universal Pictures / Universal Animation Studios / Imagine Entertainment
2006	Flushed Away	United States / United Kingdom	The Toad's Scrapbook sequence	85	Paramount Pictures / DreamWorks Animation / Aardman Animations
2007	Ratatouille	United States / France	Ending credits / Chef Gusteau's book sequence	111	Disney / Pixar
2007	Roxy Hunter and the Mystery of the Moody Ghost	United States	Opening sequence	93	Nickelodeon Movies
2007	Bee Movie	United States	Ending credits	95	Paramount Pictures / DreamWorks Animation
2007	La leyenda de la Nahuala	Mexico	Additional animation	84	Animex Producciones
2008	Horton Hears a Who!	United States	2D flying speck sequence / Horton's anime sequence	86	20th Century Fox / 20th Century Fox Animation / Blue Sky Studios
2008	Kung Fu Panda	United States	Opening sequence and ending credits	92	Paramount Pictures / DreamWorks Animation
2008	WALL-E	United States	Ending credits	98	Disney / Pixar
2008	Bolt	United States	Ending credits	97	Disney / Walt Disney Animation Studios
2008	The Secret of Kells	Ireland	Animal creations / Dream sequences	75	GKIDS / Cartoon Saloon
2008	Madagascar: Escape 2 Africa	United States	Ending credits	89	Paramount Pictures / DreamWorks Animation / PDI
2009	Cloudy with a Chance of Meatballs	United States	Baby Brent Sardines commercial / Ending credits	92	Columbia Pictures / Sony Pictures Animation
2009	Una Película de Huevos	Mexico	Opening credits	90	Videocine / Huevocartoon Producciones
2009	Black Dynamite	United States	End credits	84	ARS Nova
2009	Astro Boy	United States / Hong Kong	School Video about Robots	94	Summit Entertainment / Imangi Entertainment
2009	Planet 51	United States / Spain	Ending credits	91	Tristar Pictures / Ilion Animation Studios / Hand Made Films International
2010	Diary of a Wimpy Kid	United States	Animated cutscenes	92	20th Century Fox / Color Force
2010	Nanny McPhee Returns	United States / United Kingdom	Ending credits	112	Universal Pictures / Relativity Media / StudioCanal / Working Title Films
2010	Tangled	United States	Ending credits	100	Disney / Walt Disney Animation Studios
2010	Yogi Bear	United States	Ending credits	82	Warner Bros. Pictures
2011	Rango	United States	Ending credits	107	Paramount Pictures / GK Films / Nickelodeon Movies
2011	Rio	United States	Ending credits	96	20th Century Fox / 20th Century Fox Animation / Blue Sky Studios
2011	Kung Fu Panda 2	United States	Opening sequence / Soothsayer's story / Ending credits	90	Paramount Pictures / DreamWorks Animation
2011	Cars 2	United States	Automatic Japan Bathroom screens / Ending credits	106	Disney / Pixar
2011	Winnie the Pooh	United States	Additional animation	61	Disney / Walt Disney Animation Studios
2011	Diary of a Wimpy Kid: Rodrick Rules	United States	Animated cutscenes	100	20th Century Fox / Color Force
2011	The Smurfs	United States	Scrolling ending credits	103	Columbia Pictures / Sony Pictures Animation / The Kerner Entertainment Company
2011	Alvin and the Chipmunks: Chipwrecked	United States	Ending credits	92	20th Century Fox / Regency Enterprises
2011	The Adventures of Tintin: The Secret of the Unicorn	United States / Belgium	Opening sequence	107	Paramount Pictures / Columbia Pictures / Nickelodeon Movies
2012	Diary of a Wimpy Kid: Dog Days	United States	Animated cutscenes	94	20th Century Fox / Color Force
2012	ParaNorman	United States	TV screens / Ending credits	93	Focus Features / Laika
2012	El Santos vs. la Tetona Mendoza	Mexico	Additional animation	96	Ánima Estudios (under Átomo Films) / Peyote Films /Ítaca Films / Videocine Distribución
2012	Hotel Transylvania	United States	Ending credits	92	Columbia Pictures / Sony Pictures Animation
2012	Wreck-It Ralph	United States	2D video game animation / 2D ending credits / Walt Disney Animation Studios 2D sprite.	93	Disney / Walt Disney Animation Studios
2013	Movie 43	United States	Beezel cartoon cat	94	Relativity Media / Virgin Produced
2013	The Croods	United States	Opening sequence and ending credits	98	20th Century Fox / DreamWorks Animation
2013	Turbo	United States	News sequence	96	20th Century Fox / DreamWorks Animation
2013	Monsters University	United States	Opening credits	104	Disney / Pixar
2013	The Smurfs 2	United States	Scrolling ending credits	105	Columbia Pictures / Sony Pictures Animation / The Kerner Entertainment Company
2013	Cloudy with a Chance of Meatballs 2	United States	End Credits (also with stop-motion) and digital shorts	95	Columbia Pictures / Sony Pictures Animation
2013	Free Birds	United States	"Telenovela" sequence	91	Relativity Media / Reel FX Creative Studios
2013	Frozen	United States	Ending credits	103	Disney / Walt Disney Animation Studios
2014	The Lego Movie	United States / Denmark	LEGO character faces	101	Warner Bros. Pictures / Warner Animation Group / Village Roadshow Pictures / Lord Miller / Vertigo Entertainment / Rideback / The Lego Group
2014	Mr. Peabody & Sherman	United States	WABAC screens / End Credits	92	20th Century Fox / DreamWorks Animation
2014	Muppets Most Wanted	United States	Ending credits	111	Disney / The Jim Henson Company / Mandeville Films
2014	Barbie and the Secret Door	United States	"If I Had Magic" sequence	81	Universal Studios Home Entertainment
2014	The Boxtrolls	United States / United Kingdom	Ending Credits	100	Focus Features / Laika
2014	The Book of Life	United States	2D animated sequences / End Credits	92	20th Century Fox / 20th Century Fox Animation / Reel FX Creative Studios
2014	Rio 2	United States	Ending credits	101	20th Century Fox / 20th Century Fox Animation / Blue Sky Studios
2014	Até que a Sbórnia nos Separe	Brazil	"Kraunus's dream and ending credits" sequence	83	Otto Desenhos Animados
2014	Big Hero 6	United States	Ending credits	102	Disney / Walt Disney Animation Studios
2014	Annie	United States	Animated mermaid	118	Columbia Pictures / Village Roadshow Pictures / Overbrook Entertainment
2015	The SpongeBob Movie: Sponge Out of Water	United States	"Rap Battle and End Credits" sequence	93	Paramount Pictures / Paramount Animation / Nickelodeon Movies / United Plankton Pictures
2015	Home	United States	Oh's party commercial	94	20th Century Fox / DreamWorks Animation
2015	Guardians of Oz	México / India	Ending credits	85	Ánima Estudios / Discreet Arts Productions
2015	Seleccion Canina	México	Ending credits	90	Animex Producciones / Imagination Films
2015	Inside Out	United States	2D and non-figurative scenes in Abstract Thought	94	Disney / Pixar
2015	Minions	United States / United Kingdom	Opening credits	91	Universal Pictures / Illumination Entertainment
2015	Pixels	United States / China	Closing Credits	106	Columbia Pictures / Happy Madison Productions / 1492 Pictures / China Film Group
2015	Un gallo con muchos huevos	Mexico	Don Poncho’s flashback story and Toto’s nightmare sequence	97	Huevocartoon
2015	Hotel Transylvania 2	United States	Ending credits	89	Columbia Pictures / Sony Pictures Animation / Media Rights Capital
2015	Goosebumps	United States	Ending credits	103	Columbia Pictures / Sony Pictures Animation / Village Roadshow Pictures / Original Film / Scholastic Entertainment
2015	Top Cat Begins	México / United States / India	Ending credits	89	Anima Estudios / Discreet Art Productions / Warner Bros.
2015	Regular Show: The Movie	United States	Opening credits	68	Warner Bros. / Cartoon Network Studios / Cartoon Network
2015	The Peanuts Movie	United States	2D special effects, Animated Dance sequence	88	20th Century Fox / 20th Century Fox Animation / Blue Sky Studios
2016	El Americano: The Movie	México / United States	2D americano series sequence, Ending credits	87	Animex Producciones / Olmos Productions / Phil Roman Entertainment
2016	Kung Fu Panda 3	United States / China	Opening sequence / 2D animated sequences / Ending credits	95	20th Century Fox / DreamWorks Animation / Oriental DreamWorks / China Film Group Corporation / Zhong Ming You Ying Film
2016	Deadpool	United States	End Credits	108	20th Century Fox / Marvel Entertainment / Kinberg Genre / The Donners' Company
2016	The Angry Birds Movie	United States / Finland	Mighty Eagle sequence (created with Toon Boom Harmony)	97	Columbia Pictures / Rovio Animation
2016	Alice Through the Looking Glass	United States / United Kingdom	Ending credits	108	Disney / Roth Films
2016	Rock Dog	United States / China	Opening sequences and ending credits	80	Summit Entertainment / Mandoo Pictures / Huayi Brothers / Eracme Entertainment / Dream Factory Group
2016	A Hologram for the King	United States	Opening sequence (also with Adobe Photoshop and TVPaint)	97	Neuer Österreichischer Trickfilm (animation)
2016	Ghostbusters	United States	Rowan's Animated Ghostbusters Icon form	134	Columbia Pictures / Village Roadshow Pictures / Ghost Corps
2016	Ice Age: Collision Course	United States	Ending credits	94	20th Century Fox / Blue Sky Studios
2016	Sausage Party	United States / Canada	Firewater's Story	88	Columbia Pictures / Annapurna Pictures / Point Grey Pictures / Nitrogen Studios Canada
2016	Kubo and the Two Strings	United States	Ending credits	101	Focus Features / Laika
2016	Middle School: The Worst Years of My Life	United States	Opening Credits, Animated Characters, Animated Cutscenes, and End Credits	92	Lionsgate / CBS Films / James Patterson Entertainment / Participant Media
2016	Trolls	United States	Scrapbook sequences	91	20th Century Fox / DreamWorks Animation
2017	The Lego Batman Movie	United States / Denmark	LEGO character faces / Barbara's event screen	101	Warner Bros. Pictures / Warner Animation Group / DC Entertainment / Ratpac-Dune Entertainment / Lord Miller / Vertigo Entertainment / Rideback / The Lego Group
2017	The Boss Baby	United States	Chase scene and ending credits	98	20th Century Fox / DreamWorks Animation
2017	Captain Underpants: The First Epic Movie	United States	2D opening sequence / 2D animated cutscenes / George and Harold's brains sequences / Ending sequences	89	20th Century Fox / DreamWorks Animation
2017	Despicable Me 3	United States	Gru's plan / Ending credits	90	Universal Pictures / Illumination Entertainment
2017	Spider-Man: Homecoming	United States	Ending credits	133	Columbia Pictures / Marvel Studios / Arad Productions / Pascal Pictures
2017	Monster Island	Mexico / India	Opening credits	80	Ánima Estudios / Discreet Art Productions
2017	The Lego Ninjago Movie	United States / Denmark	Warner Bros. Pictures, Warner Animation Group and Ratpac-Dune Entertainment 2D animation creations / LEGO character faces / Ending credits	101	Warner Bros. Pictures / Warner Animation Group / Ratpac-Dune Entertainment / Lord Miller / Vertigo Entertainment / Rideback / The Lego Group
2017	Coco	United States / Mexico	Opening sequence and End credits	105	Disney / Pixar
2017	Ferdinand	United States	Valiente's sequence	107	20th Century Fox / 20th Century Fox Animation / Blue Sky Studios
2018	Peter Rabbit	United States / United Kingdom	Peter's flashback sequence / Peter's parents animated painting / 2D ending credits	95	Columbia Pictures / Sony Pictures Animation / Olive Bridge Entertainment / 2.0 Entertainment
2018	Sherlock Gnomes	United Kingdom / United States	The plan scene / 2D animated screens (created using traditional animation) / Ending credits	86	Paramount Animation / Metro Goldwyn Mayer / Rocket Pictures
2018	Isle of Dogs	United States	2D animated screens	105	Fox Searchlight Pictures / Indian Paintbrush
2018	A Wizard's Tale	México / United States / United Kingdom	Opening sequence / Ending credits	97	Ánima Estudios / GFM Animation / Prime Focus World
2018	Incredibles 2	United States	Opening Disney logo / 2D animated screens / Ending credits	118	Disney / Pixar
2018	Hotel Transylvania 3: Summer Vacation	United States	Ending credits	97	Columbia Pictures / Sony Pictures Animation
2018	The House with a Clock in Its Walls	United States	Opening credits / Ending credits	105	Universal Pictures / Amblin Entertainment / Reliance Entertainment
2018	Smallfoot	United States	Animated stones / Stonekeeper's "Let It Lie" sequence / Percy's phone game / Ending credits	96	Warner Bros. Pictures / Warner Animation Group / Zaftig Films
2018	Marcianos vs. Mexicanos	Mexico	Additional animation	87	Huevocartoon Producciones / Videocine Distribución
2018	The Nutcracker and the Four Realms	United States	Scrolling ending credits	100	Disney
2018	Ralph Breaks the Internet	United States	2D video game animation / "Let's Bee Friends" video	112	Disney / Walt Disney Animation Studios
2018	Spider-Man: Into the Spider-Verse	United States	Additional animation / Opening credits / Miles and Peter B's plan / Peni Parker's animation / Spider-Ham's title sequence (2-secs) / Spider-Ham's animation / Ending credits / Spider-Man 2099 in Earth '67 (created using limited animation)	117	Columbia Pictures / Sony Pictures Animation / Marvel Entertainment / Pascal Pictures
2019	The Kid Who Would Be King	United States / United Kingdom	Opening sequence	120	20th Century Fox / Working Title Films
2019	The Lego Movie 2: The Second Part	United States / Denmark	LEGO character faces / "Intermission" sequence	107	Warner Bros. Pictures / Warner Animation Group / Rideback / Lord Miller Productions / Vertigo Entertainment / The Lego Group
2019	How to Train Your Dragon: The Hidden World	United States	Scrolling ending credits	104	Universal Pictures / DreamWorks Animation
2019	Guava Island	United States	Title sequence (also with After Effects)	55	Six Point Harness (animation)
2019	Shazam!	United States	Ending credits	132	Warner Bros. Pictures / New Line Cinema / DC Entertainment
2019	Pokémon: Detective Pikachu	United States / Japan	Ending credits	104	Warner Bros. Pictures / Legendary Pictures / The Pokémon Company / Toho Co Ltd.
2019	Aladdin	United States / India	Genie's map sequence	128	Disney / Rideback
2019	The Secret Life of Pets 2	United States	Captain Snowball's sequence	86	Universal Pictures / Illumination Entertainment
2019	Spider-Man: Far from Home	United States	Ending credits	129	Columbia Pictures / Marvel Comics / Arad Productions / Pascal Pictures
2019	Dora and the Lost City of Gold	United States	Hallucination scene	102	Paramount Pictures / Paramount Players / Nickelodeon Movies / Walden Media / Media Rights Capital / Burr! Productions
2019	The Angry Birds Movie 2	United States / Finland	Ending credits	97	Columbia Pictures / Sony Pictures Animation / Rovio Animation
2019	Invader Zim: Enter the Florpus	United States	Some shots	71	Nickelodeon Animation Studio
2019	The Addams Family	United States / Canada	Ending credits	86	Metro-Goldwyn-Mayer / United Artists Releasing / Universal Pictures (International) / Bron Studios / Nitrogen Studios
2019	Playing with Fire	United States / Canada	Scrolling ending credits	96	Paramount Pictures / Paramount Players / Nickelodeon Movies / Walden Media
2019	Frozen II	United States	Ending credits	103	Disney / Walt Disney Animation Studios
2019	Spies in Disguise	United States	Opening sequence and ending credits	102	20th Century Fox / Blue Sky Studios
2019	Steven Universe: The Movie	United States	Opening credits	82	Cartoon Network / Warner Bros. Television Distribution / Warner Bros. Home Entertainment / Cartoon Network Studios
2020	We Bare Bears: The Movie	United States	Opening credits	69	Cartoon Network / Cartoon Network Studios / Warner Bros. Television Distribution / Warner Bros. Home Entertainment
2020	Birds of Prey (And the Fantabulous Emancipation of One Harley Quinn)	United States	Opening sequence	109	Warner Bros. Pictures / DC Entertainment
2020	Sonic the Hedgehog	United States / Japan	Ending credits	100	Paramount Pictures / SEGA / Original Film / Marza Animation Planet / Blur Studio
2020	Farmageddon: A Shaun the Sheep Movie	United Kingdom / United States	Ending credits	86	StudioCanal / Creative Europe Media / Aardman Animations / Netflix
2020	Trolls: World Tour	United States	Scrapbook sequences / "It's All Love" sequence / "Tiny Diamond Goes Back to School" digital short	90	Universal Pictures / DreamWorks Animation
2020	Cranston Academy: Monster Zone	México / Canada / United Kingdom	Ending credits	85	Ánima Estudios / ReDefine
2020	Scoob!	United States	Ending credits	94	Warner Bros. Pictures / Warner Animation Group / Hanna-Barbera Productions / 1492 Pictures / Atlas Entertainment
2020	The SpongeBob Movie: Sponge on the Run	United States / Canada	2D effects / Ending credits	91	Paramount Animation / Nickelodeon Movies / United Plankton Pictures / MRC
2020	The Croods: A New Age	United States	Opening sequence / Eep and Guy's separation sequence	95	Universal Pictures / DreamWorks Animation
2020	Soul	United States	Terry and Jerries's animation	100	Disney / Pixar
2021	Raya and the Last Dragon	United States	Opening sequence / Ending credits	107	Disney / Walt Disney Animation Studios
2021	Peter Rabbit 2: The Runaway	United States / United Kingdom	Peter's animated paintings / Ending credits	93	Columbia Pictures / Sony Pictures Animation / MRC / Animal Logic / Olive Bridge Entertainment / 2.0 Entertainment
2021	The Boss Baby: Family Business	United States	Ending credits	107	Universal Pictures / DreamWorks Animation
2021	Space Jam: A New Legacy	United States	"Tune World" sequence (created using traditional animation) / Rick and Morty's animation	115	Warner Bros. Pictures / Warner Animation Group / SpringHill Entertainment
2021	Vivo	United States	"Mambo Cabana" sequence / Ending credits	95	Columbia Pictures / Sony Pictures Animation / Sony Pictures Releasing / Netflix
2021	My Little Pony: A New Generation	United States	Mane 6 opening sequence and storyboard by using traditional animation	90	Boulder Media / EOne Entertainment / Netflix
2021	The Addams Family 2	United States / Canada	Ending sequence	93	Metro-Goldwyn-Mayer / United Artists Releasing / Universal Pictures (International) / Bron Studios / Nitrogen Studios
2021	Ron's Gone Wrong	United States / United Kingdom	Bubble-bots' faces and textures / Ending credits	106	20th Century Studios / Locksmith Animation
2021	Clifford the Big Red Dog	United States / Canada	Opening sequence / Ending sequence / Ending credits	96	Paramount Pictures / Scholastic Entertainment / The Kerner Entertainment Company / New Republic Pictures / Entertainment One
2021	Encanto	United States	Ending credits	102	Disney / Walt Disney Animation Studios
2022	Hotel Transylvania: Transformania	United States	Ending credits	98	Columbia Pictures / Sony Pictures Animation / Sony Pictures Releasing / MRC / Amazon Studios
2022	Turning Red	United States	Ending credits	100	Disney / Pixar
2023	Home Is Somewhere Else	United States / Mexico	Additional animation	87	Brinca Taller de Animación / Shine Global / Llamarada Estudio / Casiopea Animación / Virus Mecánico
2023	The Super Mario Bros. Movie	United States	Opening Nintendo logo	92	Universal Pictures / Illumination / Nintendo
2023	Ruby Gillman, Teenage Kraken	United States	Ending credits	91	Universal Pictures / DreamWorks Animation
2023	Under the Boardwalk	United States	Ending Credits	83	Paramount Animation / Big Kid Pictures
2024	IF	United States	Opening Paramount logo	104	Paramount Pictures / Sunday Night Productions
2024	The Garfield Movie	United States	Animated Flashbacks	101	Columbia Pictures / Alcon Entertainment
2024	Inside Out 2	United States	Bloofy the Dog / Pouchy the Magic Fanny Pack (all created using traditional animation) and his items	96	Disney / Pixar
2024	Wallace & Gromit: Vengeance Most Fowl	United Kingdom	Wallace's computer scene	79	BBC / Aardman
2025	Smurfs	United States	2D opening sequence / Video game dimension sequence / Anime dimension sequence	89	Paramount Animation
2025	Fixed	United States	Additional animation	85	Sony Pictures Animation / Netflix

== See also ==
- Flash animation
- Anima Estudios
- Animation
- Adobe Flash
- List of Flash animated television series
