= Mundo Gaturro =

2010 video game

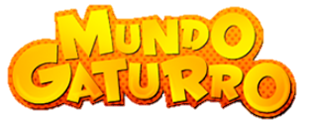
- Developer: QB9 Entertainment
- Engine: Adobe Flash
- Platforms: Microsoft Windows, macOS
- Release: 2010
- Genre: MMO

Mundo Gaturro (abbreviated as MG) is a multiplayer online game (MMO) for children based on the character Gaturro. The site was developed in 2010 by the Argentine company QB9 Entertainment, the same year a film adaptation of the comic book character and animated series was released. In 2012, it received an award in the children's category at the Mate.ar Awards.

== History ==
Developer QB9 Entertainment is based in Argentina. Mundo Gaturro began as a project by Nik in 2009, conceived as a game for children aged 4 to 12. In 2010, it was officially launched worldwide, initially featuring missions, the ability to redeem items, and more.

In 2011, there were updates to the design for a more user-friendly interface. Later, in 2014, the mobile version was revamped, adding applications that

Screenshot of Mundo Gaturro in the Rosedal, a place of the game

players could purchase with in-game coins and making minor improvements.

In 2016, Mundo Gaturro Pocket was released for Android and iOS, offering exclusive servers and locations.

In March of the same year, a downloadable version was launched for both Microsoft Windows and macOS systems. This allowed players to enjoy the game without using a web browser and offered the option to play in fullscreen mode.

In 2017 further improvements were made, changing the player profile from a window (similar to Club Penguin) to a less intrusive section at the bottom with additional clothing customization options.

Currently, only the downloadable version can be used due to the discontinuation of Adobe Flash.

== Features and functionalities ==
The game allows players to have friends, chat, complete missions, use costumes, access the Passport subscription, use various modes of transportation, apply effects, decorate their in-game house, purchase items to expand their house, and use a mobile phone where players can stay updated with news, play games, and receive messages from their friends. Additionally, there are various other miscellaneous activities that players can engage in within Mundo Gaturro.

Mundo Gaturro also features a social network called Picapon. During periods when Picapon was undergoing maintenance, it was temporarily replaced by 'Mundo Gaturro Mobile,' which allowed players to play on their mobile devices. However, in this mobile version, players were limited to chatting and walking in a small green space, dressing their avatars with clothing and hairstyles that were initially provided in Mundo Gaturro, and changing the avatar's gender and age.

== Controversies and criticism ==
One of the main controversies surrounding this game is the discrimination that exists within it. Some Gaturros (players), known as 'Chetos,' insult and discourage novice players from participating. These 'Chetos' often have their houses filled with items, skins of all colors except yellow, effects, Passport subscriptions, clothing, and transportation options obtained through it, among other things.

One of the concerns among users is the persistent issue where, in some cases, the Passport subscription continues to be charged even though the user cannot cancel their subscription. This problem has sparked discussions and frustration within the player community.

These incidents have raised questions about the transparency and efficiency of the registration management process in the virtual environment of Mundo Gaturro. The lack of a clear option to cancel Passports in some cases has led to accusations of lack of transparency on the part of users, who have expressed their dissatisfaction on forums and social media.

=== Alleged Closure ===
In March 2024, Argentine YouTuber Gianfy Albes, in collaboration with his friend Tomás Feurmann, created a fake image suggesting the closure of the Mundo Gaturro game. This image was spread through the TikTok platform, using fake accounts pretending to be YouTubers from the Mundo Gaturro universe.

This action generated a great impact on social media, even making the topic "Mundo Gaturro" trend on Twitter (currently in the process of changing to 'X'). This incident sparked public debate and a wave of concern among the game's fans.

Despite the uproar generated, the official Mundo Gaturro accounts quickly confirmed that the information was false and that the game was not in danger of closure.
