= Kids' Choice Awards Argentina 2013 =

2011 music awards

Nickelodeon's 3rd Annual Kids' Choice Awards Argentina
- Date: 18 October 2013
- Location: Microestadio Malvinas Argentinas, Buenos Aires
- Hosted by: Diego Ramos
- Most awards: Lali (2)
- Most nominations: Lali (2)

Television/radio coverage
- Network: Nickelodeon Latin America
- Runtime: 120 minutes
- Produced by: Production company: Nickelodeon Productions; Executive producer: Paula Guerro Tatiana Rodriguez

The Kids Choice Awards Argentina 2013 took place on October 18th, 2013 at Microestadio Malvinas Argentinas in Buenos Aires. Prior to the event, on July 23rd, 2013, the first stage was announced, which included a list of 17 categories along with their pre-nominees. The awards ceremony aimed to honor and recognize the achievements of various individuals and entertainers in Argentina, as voted by the audience.

On September 6th, 2013, the second stage of the Kids Choice Awards Argentina 2013 was unveiled, revealing the official nominees for each category. The event was hosted by Argentine actor Diego Ramos. The ceremony was made even more exciting with live performances by popular artists such as Lali Espósito, Tan Bionica, Airbag and Aliados.

== Winners and nominees ==
List of nominees and winners:.

== Categories ==
=== Favourite TV Show ===
Series/Teen-Drama	Result	Country
Grachi	Nominated	United States
Violetta	Won	Argentina
Aliados	Nominated	Argentina
Solamente Vos	Nominated	Argentina

=== Favourite TV Actor ===
Series/Teen-Drama	Result	Country
Pedro Lanzani	Won	Argentina
Andrés Mercado	Nominated	Colombia
Jorge Blanco	Nominated	Mexico
Emiliano Flores	Nominated	Venezuela

=== Favourite TV Actress ===
Series/Teen-Drama	Result	Country
Lali Espósito	Won	Argentina
Lodovica Comello/Francesca	Nominated	Italy
Sol Rodriguez/Mecha	Nominated	Argentina
Martina Stoessel/ Violetta	Nominated	Argentina

=== Favourite Actor of Cast ===
Series/Teen-Drama	Result	Country
Samuel Nascimento/	Won	Brazil
Reinaldo Zavarce/	Nominated	Venezuela
Mex Urtizberea/	Nominated	Argentina
Benjamín Rojas/	Nominated	Argentina

=== Favourite Villain ===
Artist/Character	Series/Teen-Drama	Result	Country
Mercedes Lambre/Ludmila	Violetta	Won	Argentina
Danilo Carrera/Axel	Grachi	Nominated	Ecuador
María Gabriela de Faría/Mía	Grachi	Nominated	Venezuela
Mariel Percossi/Maia	Aliados	Nominated	Argentina

=== Revelation ===
Artist/Character	Series/Teen-Drama	Result	Country
Oriana Sabatini/	Aliados	Won	Argentina
Ángela Torres/Mora Cousteau	Solamente Vos	Nominated	Argentina
Nicolás Francella/Inti	Aliados	Nominated	Argentina
Xabiani Ponce De León/Marco	Violetta	Nominated	Mexico

=== International TV Show ===
Series	Result	Country
Good Luck Charlie	Nominated	United States
Big Time Rush	Won	United States
Austin & Ally	Nominated	United States
Victorious	Nominated	United States

=== Favourite Animated Series ===
Series	Result	Country
The Simpsons	Won	United States
Teenage Mutant Ninja Turtles	Nominated	United States
SpongeBob SquarePants	Nominated	United States
Phineas and Ferb	Nominated	United States

=== Artist or Favourite Latin Group ===
Artist/Band	Result	Country
Isabella Castillo	Won	Cuba
Airbag	Nominated	United States
Restart	Nominated	Brazil
Eme 15	Nominated	Mexico

=== Favourite Latin Song ===
Song/Artist	Result	Country
Ciudad mágica/Tan Bionica	Won	Argentina
Pensando en ti/Axel (singer)	Nominated	Argentina
¡Corre!/Jesse & Joy	Nominated	Mexico
Yo te esperaré/Cali & El Dandee	Nominated	Colombia

=== Favourite Radio Program ===
Radio Program	Radio Station	Result	Country
Comunidad TKM	Radio TKM	Won	Argentina
El Despertador	Radio Disney	Nominated	Argentina
Todos Tus Éxitos	Radio Disney	Nominated	Argentina
Mundo TKM	Radio TKM	Nominated	Argentina

=== Favourite International Song ===
Song	Artist/Band	Result	Country
One Way or Another (Teenage Kicks)	One Direction	Won	United Kingdom
We Are Never Ever Getting Back Together	Taylor Swift	Nominated	United States
Gangnam Style	Psy	Nominated	(South Korea)
Beauty and a Beat	Justin Bieber	Nominated	Canada

=== Best Animated Film ===
Movie	Result	Country
Despicable Me 2/Mi Villano Favorito 2	Won	United States
Brave/Valiente	Nominated	United States
Metegol/Metegol	Nominated	Argentina Spain
Monsters University	Nominated	United States

=== Film Favourite in Cinemas ===
Movie/Spanish	Result	Country
Teen Angels 3D	Won	Argentina
Fast & Furious 6/Rápidos y furiosos 6	Nominated	United States United Kingdom (Spain)
Oz the Great and Powerful/Oz: el Poderoso	Nominated	United States
The Twilight Saga: Breaking Dawn - Part 2/Crepúsculo la saga: Amanecer - Parte 2	Nominated	United States

=== Sportsman of the Year ===
Player	Result	Country
Lionel Messi	Won	Argentina (Spain)
Sergio Agüero	Nominated	Argentina (Spain)
Juan Martín del Potro	Nominated	Argentina
Manu Ginóbili	Nominated	Argentina

=== Best Celebrity on Twitter ===
Twitter	Result	Country
Lali Espósito	Won	Argentina
María Eugenia Suárez	Nominated	Argentina
Roger González	Nominated	Mexico
Luisana Lopilato	Nominated	Argentina

=== Favourite App ===
App	Result	Country
Candy Crush Saga	Won	United States
SpongeBob Moves In	Nominated	United States
Temple Run	Nominated	United States
Mundo Gaturro	Nominated	United States
Odyssey of pets	Nominated	United States
