= Vishva Malla =

King of Bhaktapur
- Reign: 1547-1558
- Predecessor: Prana Malla
- Successor: Ganga Rani (joint rule with her sons)
- Born: Kingdom of Bhaktapur, Nepal
- Died: 29 October 1558; Bhaktapur, Nepal
- Spouse: Ganga Rani
- Issue: Trailokya Malla; Tribhuvana Malla
- Dynasty: Malla

Vishva Malla (Newar: 𑐰𑐶𑐱𑑂𑐰 𑐩𑐮𑑂𑐮) (died 1560) was a Malla dynasty king of Bhaktapur, Nepal from 1547 to 1560. Unlike many of the other Malla rulers, there is little evidence today that he was particularly active in construction developments in Durbar Square in Bhaktapur.

He died on NS 679 kartika sukla 8, translating to 29 October 1558.
