= Valentina (2008 film) =

Valentina, La Película
- Directed by: Eduardo Gondell
- Written by: Daniel García Molt; Eduardo Gondell; Esteban J. Szejer
- Produced by: Hugo E. Lauría; José Luis Massa
- Starring: Florencia Otero; Sebastián Francini; Gastón D'Angelo; Lucila Gómez; Natalí Pérez
- Edited by: Laura Palotini
- Music by: Diego Monk
- Production company: telefe
- Distributed by: Illusion Studios; Vision Films
- Release date: July 24, 2008
- Running time: 65 minutes
- Countries: Argentina; Uruguay
- Language: Spanish
- Box office: $631,182

Valentina is a 2008 Argentinian traditionally animated romantic-comedy film released in theaters throughout Argentina, Mexico, and Uruguay on July 24, 2008. It also had a limited release in the United States later that year. It stars Florencia Otero, as the voice of Valentina, and Sebastián Francini, as the voice of Fede. It is also Illusion Studios' first feature film. An English dub was made in 2020 for UP Faith and Family.

== Plot ==
Valentina, an 11 or 12-year-old girl is being told the story of how her grandmother got her first kiss. Valentina dreams about her first kiss and how she'll fall in love without a doubt just like her grandmother said. The next day at school, the new kid Matias catches Valentina's eyes and soon asks her out to a party, though one of her friends Fede tries to ask her out but doesn't have the courage to. When Matias invites her to a party, they go but soon Valentina realizes what a jerk he really is and when Fede's cousin shows up, with Valentina mistaking her for his girlfriend, she realizes he's the one she should have been with. At the bonfire for the end of spring, Valentina confesses her feelings for Fede and tells her his girlfriend was just his cousin. They kiss and Valentina's friends sing a Spanish-style song and Valentina's puppy barks happily.

== Cast ==
- Florencia Otero as Valentina
- Sebastián Francini as Fede
- Lucila Gómez as Sammy
- Natalí Pérez as Andy
- Gastón D' Angelo as Nacho
- Nicolás Maiques as Lucas
- Mariano Chiesa as Matías/Director/Dark
- Jimena Domínguez as Lucero
- Luciana Falcón as Abuela/Maestra
- Valeria Gómez as Mamá de Fede

== Release ==
It opened in various theaters throughout Argentina, Mexico and Uruguay on July 24, 2008.

== Box office ==
This film opened at #11 on its opening weekend, earning $72,835 pesos ($340,782 USD). It grossed $631,182 worldwide.

== See also ==
- Illusion Studios
