= Nepal Sambat =

Nepalese Traditional calendar

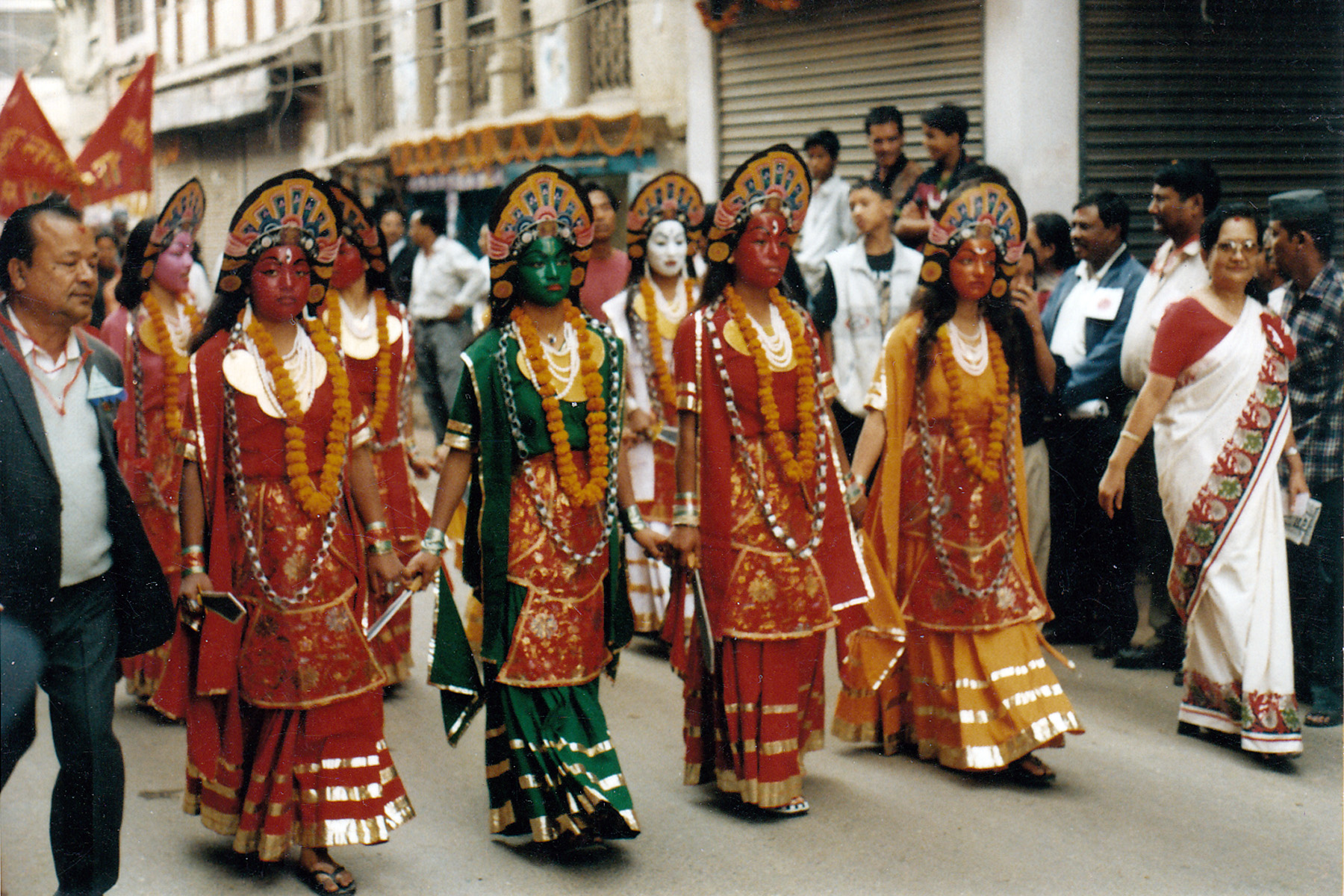
Actors dressed up as Ajima mother goddesses take part in New Year's Day parade in Kathmandu.

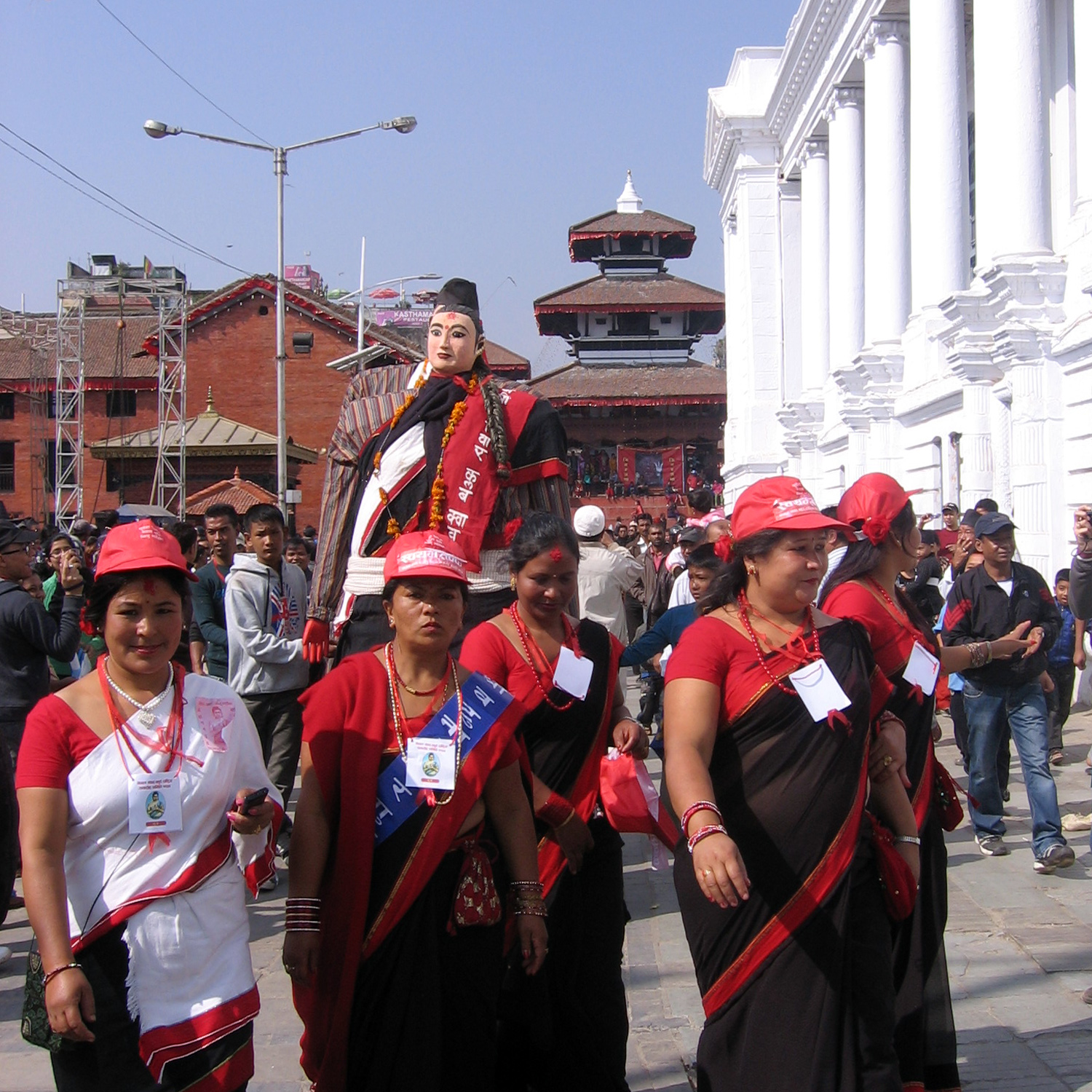
Part of New Year's Day parade

Nepal Sambat (Newar: 𑐣𑐾𑐥𑐵𑐮 𑐳𑐩𑑂𑐧𑐟𑑂, nepāla samvat, meaning "Nepal Era") is the lunisolar calendar used by the Newar people of Nepal. It was the official calendar of Nepal since its inception on 20 October 879 till the end of the Malla dynasty in 1769. During the period, Nepal Sambat appeared on coins, stone and copper plate inscriptions, royal decrees, chronicles, Hindu and Buddhist manuscripts, legal documents and correspondence. After the conquest of Nepal by the Shahs in 1769, the official calendar of the country was replaced with Shaka era and then later by the Bikram Samvat.

The calendar still holds cultural significance in Nepal, especially among the Newar people, whose festivals are based on this calendar system. Owing to its cultural and historical significance, the government of Nepal declared to include Nepal Sambat in official government documents alongside Vikram Sambat since 11 November 2023.

The origin of Nepal Sambat is often the subject of folklore like that of Sankhadhar Sakhwa, a semi-legendary figure who often appears in folklore as the progenitor of the calendar system. However, its historical origins still remain a mystery.

== History ==
Nepal Sambat was established on 20 October 879 when Rāghavadeva was ruling Nepal. The origins of the calendar system however remains a mystery. Many experts have theorized on its origin but there is yet to be a theory that is unanimously agreed upon by experts.

A 14th century chronicle states that a new era was dedicated to Pashupati during the reign of Rāghavadeva leading some historians like Petech to theorize that the foundation of the new era is related to the completion of a sacred event related to Pasupati.

Historian Baburam Acharya suggests that Rāghavadeva started the Nepal Sambat to commemorate the foundation of the Thakuri dynasty and the end of the Licchavi dynasty.

Art Historian Pal does not theorize on the era's origin but suggests that the establishment of a new era named after the country indicated a growing sense of national identity among the native Newar people in the 9th century.

Orientalist Sylvain Lévi suggests that Nepal Sambat was derived from the Shaka era by deducting 800 from the latter because "(sic) the number 8 is considered inauspicious by the Nepalese". Modern historian do not accept this claim as the Shaka era is 801.7 years ahead of Nepal Sambat. Lévi also theorized that Nepal Sambat was started to celebrate Nepal's autonomy from the Tibetan Empire following the murder of Langdarma, a claim which is also rejected by modern historians as the murder occurred in 842 CE.

Nepalese Historian Gautama V. Vajracharya suggests a similar theory to Lévi, suggesting that Nepal Sambat did derive from Shaka era. He posits that Nepal Sambat was established when the Shaka era reached year 801, following the historical practice of lokakāla, where a new era was established by resetting the year count to 1 after the completion of a century.

=== Sankhadhar Sakhwa ===
However, the most prevalent theory about the origin of the calendar system is that of Sankhadhar Sakhwa. According to the local folklore, Nepal Sambat was started by a merchant named Sankhadhar Sakhwa (Newar: 𑐱𑑄𑐏𑐢𑐬 𑐳𑐵𑐏𑑂𑐰𑐵𑑅) to commemorate the day when he cleared the debts of people of Nepal Valley.

According to the folklore, an astrologer from Bhaktapur predicted that the sand at the confluence Bhacha Khushi and Bishnumati River in Kathmandu would transform into gold at a certain moment, so the king sent a team of workers to Kathmandu to collect sand from the spot at the special hour. A local merchant named Sankhadhar Sakhwa saw them resting with their baskets of sand at a traveler's shelter at Maru before returning to Bhaktapur. Believing that the sand to be unusual if the workers were gathering it, he convinced them to give it to him instead. The next day, Sakhwa discovered his sand had turned to gold, while the king of Bhaktapur was left with a pile of ordinary sand which his porters had dug up after the auspicious hour had passed. Sankhadhar used the gold to repay the debts of the Nepali people.

Several sources from the Malla Dynasty even refer to the calendar system after Sakhwa; a manuscript from 1645 (NS 766) refer to the era as, Samvat Sankudatta after Sankhwa, a Jataka manuscript from 1743 (NS 864) refer to it as, nepalike samkhadarabde samvat ("the nepal era created by Sankhadhar") and a stone inscription from Bhaktapur refer to it as "Samkhava Samvat". However, the historicity of Sankhadhar Sankhwa is still a matter of debate among historians.

== Historical usage ==
Date of Nepal Sambat written in an inscription during the reign of King Jayasthiti Malla, NS 512 (1392 CE).

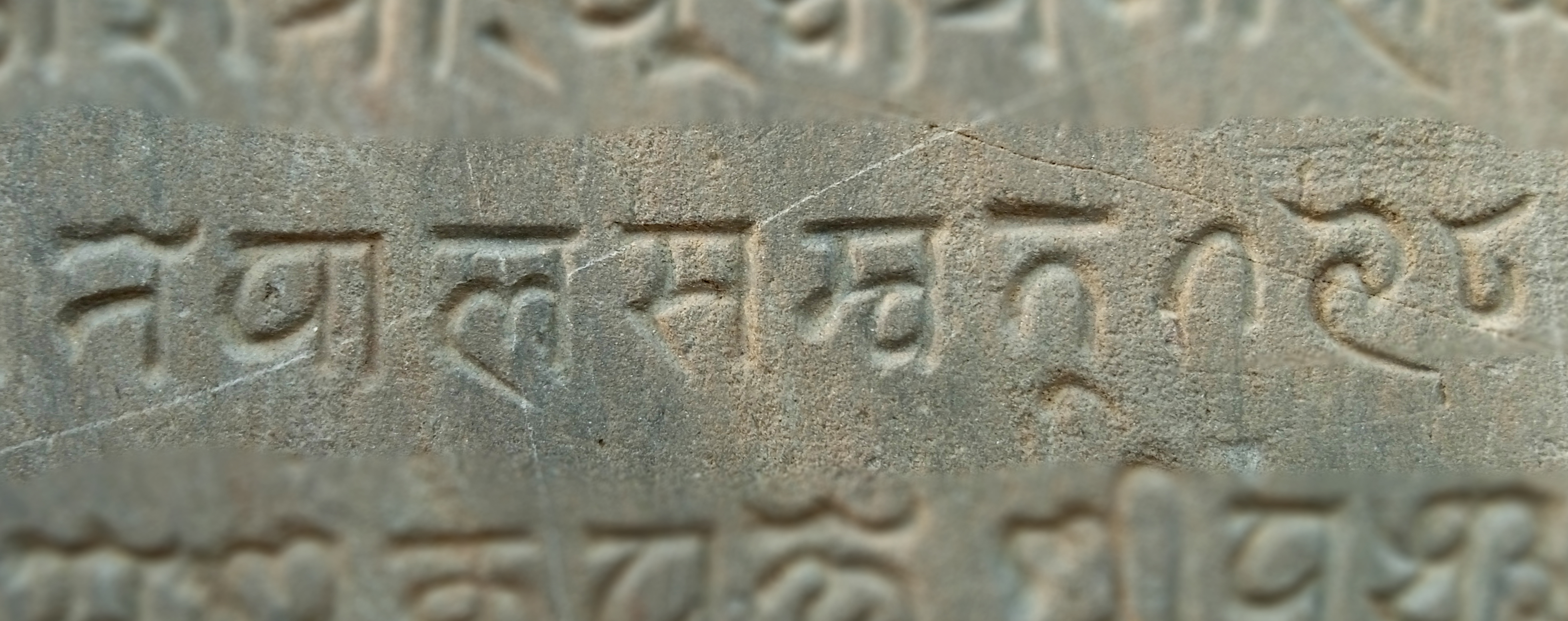
Use of Nepal Sambat in a Malla dynasty stone inscription from Bhaktapur.

The name Nepal Sambat was used for the calendar for the first time in Nepal Sambat 148 (1028 CE).

Nepal Sambat has also been used outside Nepal Mandala in Nepal and in other countries including India and China. Nepal Sambat is used in a letter from the Yongle Emperor of the Ming dynasty to Shaktisimha of Nepal, which is dated Nepal Sambat 535 (1415 CE). In Kashi, an inscription of Queen Ganga Rani, the mother of Trailokya Malla, is dated to Nepal Sambat 692 (1572 CE) and is written in Newar language and Sanskrit. Similarly, Nepal Sambat is also used on coins of Koch Bihar ruler Pran Narayan, who was the brother-in-law of Pratap Malla. The gold coins of Pran Narayan are dated to Nepal Sambat 753 (1633 CE).

In Gorkha, a stone inscription at the Bhairav Temple at Pokharithok Bazaar contains the date Nepal Sambat 704 (1584 CE). An inscription in the Khas language at a rest house in Salyankot is dated Nepal Sambat 912 (1792 CE). In east Nepal, an inscription on the Bidyadhari Ajima Temple in Bhojpur recording the donation of a door and tympanum is dated Nepal Sambat 1011 (1891 CE). The Bindhyabasini Temple in Bandipur in west Nepal contains an inscription dated Nepal Sambat 950 (1830 CE) recording the donation of a tympanum. The Palanchok Bhagawati Temple situated to the east of Kathmandu contains an inscription recording a land donation dated Nepal Sambat 861 (1741 CE).

Similarly, Nepali merchants based in Tibet (Lhasa Newars) used Nepal Sambat in their official documents, correspondence and inscriptions recording votive offerings. A copper plate recording the donation of a tympanum at the shrine of Chhwaskamini Ajima (Tibetan: Palden Lhamo) in the Jokhang Temple in Lhasa is dated Nepal Sambat 781 (1661 CE).

Painting of Goddess Ganga in the Newar style, with NS 771 (1651 CE) written in the colophon.

== Suppression ==
Nepal Sambat was replaced as the national calendar in Rana period of the Kingdom of Nepal. The victory of the Gorkha Kingdom resulted in the end of the Malla dynasty and the advent of The Shahs used Saka era. However, Nepal Sambat remained in official use for a time even after the coming of the Shahs. For example, the treaty with Tibet signed during the reign of Pratap Singh Shah is dated Nepal Sambat 895 (1775 CE). In 1903, Saka Sambat, in turn, was superseded by Bikram Sambat as the official calendar. However, the government continued to use Saka Sambat on gold and silver coins till 1912 when it was fully replaced by Bikram Sambat.

== Revival ==
The campaign to reinstate Nepal Sambat as the national calendar began in the 1920s when Dharmaditya Dharmacharya, a Buddhist and Nepal Bhasa activist based in Kolkata, initiated a campaign to promote it as the national calendar. The movement was continued by language and cultural activists in Nepal with the advent of democracy following the ouster of the autocratic Rana dynasty in 1951. The demand to make Nepal Sambat a national calendar intensified with the establishment of Nepal Bhasa Manka Khala in 1979. It organized rallies and public functions publicizing the importance of the era as a symbol of nationalism. Nepal Sambat has also emerged as a symbol to rally people against the suppression of their culture, language and literature by the politically dominant ruling classes. The Panchayat regime suppressed the movement by arresting and imprisoning the activists. In 1987 in Kathmandu, a road running event organized to mark the New Year was broken up by police and the runners thrown in jail.

=== Reinstated as national calendar ===
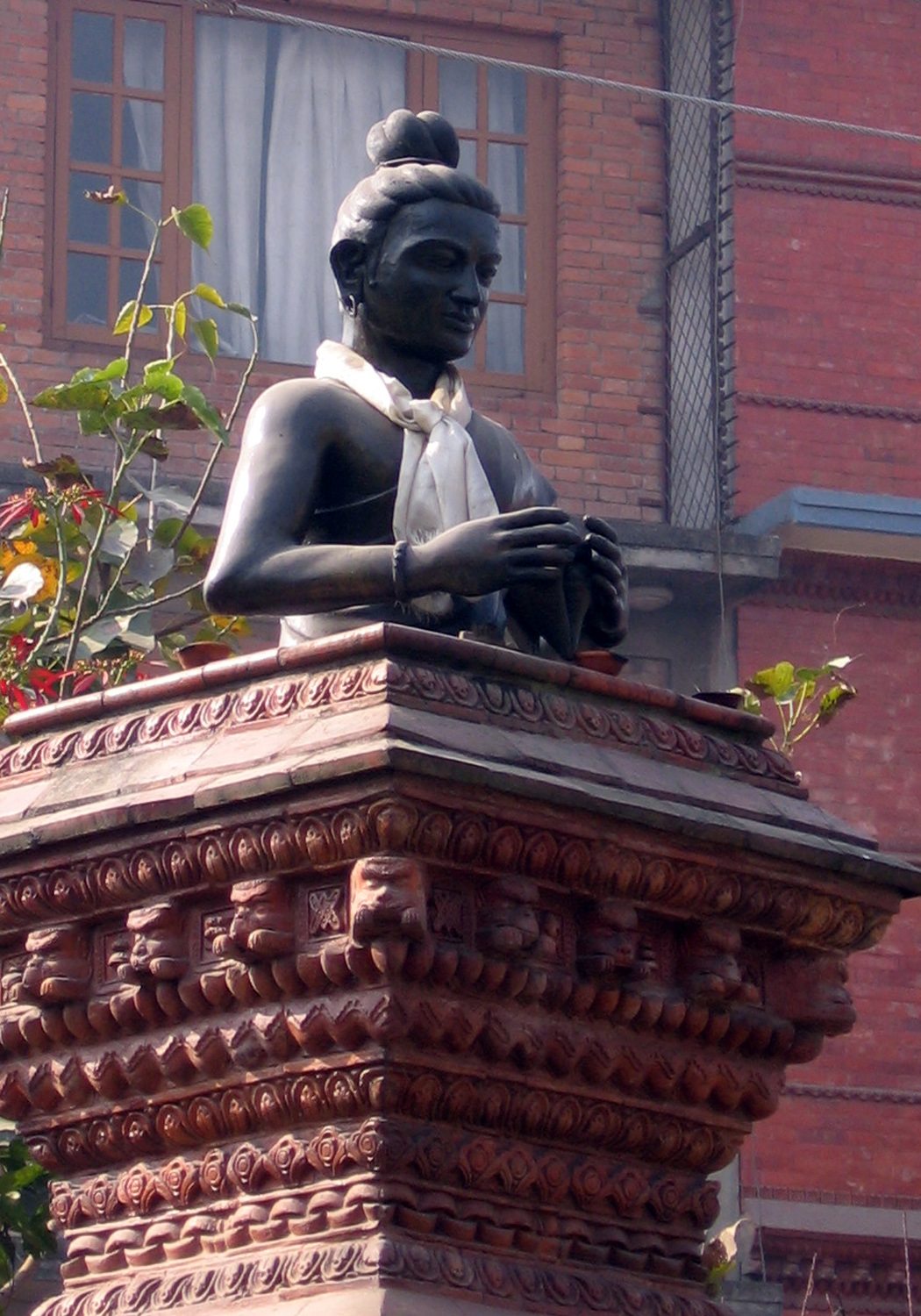
Statue of Sankhadhar Sakhwa at Pulchok, Lalitpur.

The Nepal Sambat movement achieved its first success on 18 November 1999 when the government declared the founder of the calendar, Sankhadhar Sakhwa (शंखधर साख्वा), a national hero. On 26 October 2003, the Department of Postal Service issued a commemorative postage stamp depicting his portrait. A statue of Sankhadhar was erected in Tansen, Palpa in western Nepal on 28 January 2012.

On 25 October 2011, the government decided to bring Nepal Sambat into use as the country's national calendar following prolonged lobbying by cultural and social organizations, most prominently by Nepal Bhasa Manka Khala, and formed a taskforce to make recommendations on its implementation. All major newspapers now print Nepal Sambat along with other dates on their mastheads. New Year's Day celebrations have also spread from the Kathmandu Valley to other towns in Nepal as well as abroad.

== Current usage ==
Nepal Sambat is used majorly among Newar people. The lunar calendar is used for celebration of festival and observation of rituals. Lalitpur Metropolitan City began ascribing Nepal Sambat dates along Bikram Sambat dates since the year 1140, i.e. mid 2020.

== Lunar Calendar ==
The Lunar Calendar of Nepal Sambat or the Lunar Nepal Sambat spans from 353 to 355 (in leap 383 to 385) days in a year.

=== Months of the year ===
On regular years, there are twelve months. An intercalary month is added every three years to prevent the calendar from drifting with the seasons. Roughly in every two decades a month is reduced which makes eleven months a year.

S.N.	Name	Newar script	Devanagari script	Corresponding Gregorian month	Name of Full Moon
1.	Kachhalā	𑐎𑐕𑐮𑐵	कछला	October–November	Saki Milā Punhi, Kārtik Purnimā
2.	Thinlā	𑐠𑐶𑑄𑐮𑐵	थिंला	November–December	Yomari Punhi, Dhānya Purnimā
3.	Pwanhelā	𑐥𑑂𑐰𑑃𑐴𑐾𑐮𑐵	प्वँहेला	December–January	Milā Punhi, Paush Purnimā
4.	Silā	𑐳𑐶𑐮𑐵	सिला	January–February	Si Punhi, Māghi Purnimā
5.	Chilā	𑐔𑐶𑐮𑐵	चिला	February–March	Holi Punhi, Phāgu Purnimā
6.	Chaulā	𑐔𑑁𑐮𑐵	चौला	March–April	Lhuti Punhi, Bālāju Purnimā
7.	Bachhalā	𑐧𑐕𑐮𑐵	बछला	April–May	Swānyā Punhi, Baisākh Purnimā
8.	Tachhalā	𑐟𑐕𑐮𑐵	तछला	May–June	Jyā Punhi, Gaidu Purnimā
9.	Dilā	𑐡𑐶𑐮𑐵	दिला	June–July	Dillā Punhi, Guru Purnimā
10.	Gunlā	𑐐𑐸𑑄𑐮𑐵	गुंला	July–August	Gun Punhi, Janāi Purnimā (Raksha Bandhan)
11.	Yanlā	𑐫𑑄𑐮𑐵	ञंला	August–September	Yenyā Punhi, Bhādra Purnimā
12.	Kaulā	𑐎𑑁𑐮𑐵	कौला	September–October	Katin Punhi, Kojāgrat Purnimā
13.	Analā	𑐀𑐣𑐮𑐵	अनला	The intercalary month	Analā Punhi
14.	Nhanlā	𑐴𑑂𑐣𑑄𑐮𑐵	न्हंला	The reduced month	-

=== New Year ===
New Year's Day falls on the first day of the waxing moon during the Swanti festival. Traditionally, traders used to close their ledgers and open new account books on the first day of Nepal Sambat. Newars observe New Year's Day by performing Mha Puja (Newari: 𑐴𑑂𑐩𑐥𑐸𑐖𑐵, म्हपुजा), a ritual to purify and empower the soul for the coming New Year besides praying for longevity. During this ceremony, family members sit cross-legged in a row on the floor in front of mandalas (sand paintings) drawn for each person. Offerings are made to the mandala, and each family member is presented auspicious ritual food which includes boiled egg, smoked fish and rice wine during the Sagan ceremony. Mha Puja and Nepal Sambat are also celebrated abroad where Nepali peoples have settled.

Outdoor celebrations of the new year consist of cultural processions, pageants, and rallies. Participants dressed in traditional Newar clothing like tapālan, suruwā and hāku patāsi parade on the streets. Musical bands playing various kinds of drums take part in the processions. Streets and market squares are decorated with arches, gates, and banners bearing new year greetings. The president of Nepal also issues a message of greetings on the occasion of New Year's Day. Public functions are held in which the prime minister and other government leaders participate. Marking a break from tradition, Prime Minister Baburam Bhattarai gave his speech at the New Year's Day program in 2011 in Nepal Bhasa.

=== Monthly cycle ===
The monthly cycle of Lunar Nepal Sambat is based on Hindu units of time. The month ends on the new moon and begins on the first day of the waxing moon. Each month is divided into thwa and gа̄ (Nepal Bhasa: 𑐠𑑂𑐰𑑅 / 𑐐𑐵𑑅, थ्वः / गाः). The period of waxing moon is called thwa and the period of waning moon is called gaa. Each lunar phase is known as milа̄lyа̄ (Nepal Bhasa: 𑐩𑐶𑐮𑐵𑐮𑑂𑐫𑐵𑑅, मिलाल्याः). The lunar phases are named as follows:

Sl.No	Thwa	Gа̄
1	Pratipada / Pāru	Pratipada / Pāru
2	Dvitīyā	Dvitīyā
3	Tr̥tīyā	Tr̥tīyā
4	Caturthī	Caturthī
5	Pañcamī	Pañcamī
6	Ṣaṣṭhī	Ṣaṣṭhī
7	Saptamī	Saptamī
8	Aṣṭamī	Aṣṭamī
9	Navamī	Navamī
10	Daśamī	Daśamī
11	Ekādaśī	Ekādaśī
12	Dvādaśī	Dvādaśī
13	Trayodaśī	Trayodaśī
14	Caturdaśī	Caturdaśī/Carhe
15	Purṇimā / Punhi (full moon)	Amāvāsyā/Āmai (new moon)

== Solar Calendar ==
Following the official use of Nepal Sambat in Lalitpur Metropolitan City, a solar version of calendar was devised from the year 1141 (C.E. 2020), intending to expand use of Nepal Sambat for official and administrative purposes.

=== Months of the year ===
The Solar Calendar of Nepal Sambat or the Solar Nepal Sambat follows a consistent pattern of division of years.

S.N.	Name	Newar script	Devanagari script	Corresponding Gregorian month	Number of days
1.	Kachhalā	𑐎𑐕𑐮𑐵	कछला	October 20 - November 18	30 days
2.	Thinlā	𑐠𑐶𑑄𑐮𑐵	थिंला	November 19 - December 18	30 days
3.	Pwanhelā	𑐥𑑂𑐰𑑃𑐴𑐾𑐮𑐵	प्वँहेला	December 19 - January 17	30 days
4.	Silā	𑐳𑐶𑐮𑐵	सिला	January 18 - February 16	30 days
5.	Chilā	𑐔𑐶𑐮𑐵	चिला	February 17 - March 17/18	30 days
6.	Chaulā	𑐔𑑁𑐮𑐵	चौला	March 18/19 - April 16/17	29 days on regular years, 30 days on leap years
7.	Bachhalā	𑐧𑐕𑐮𑐵	बछला	April 17/18 - May 17	31 days
8.	Tachhalā	𑐟𑐕𑐮𑐵	तछला	May 18 - June 17	31 days
9.	Dilā	𑐡𑐶𑐮𑐵	दिला	June 18 - July 18	31 days
10.	Gunlā	𑐐𑐸𑑄𑐮𑐵	गुंला	July 19 - August 18	31 days
11.	Yanlā	𑐫𑑄𑐮𑐵	यंला	August 19 - September 18	31 days
12.	Kaulā	𑐎𑑁𑐮𑐵	कौला	September 19 - October 19	31 days

=== Leap year ===
The leap year determination of Solar Nepal Sambat follows a similar pattern of determining leap year in Gregorian Calendar.

== Milestones ==
888 Nepal Sambat (1768 CE) - Prithvi Narayan Shah's Gorkhali forces take Kathmandu.
926 (1806) - Bhandarkhal Massacre establishes Bhimsen Thapa as the prime minister of Nepal.
966 (1846) - Kot massacre establishes Jang Bahadur Rana as the prime minister of Nepal and the Rana dynasty.
1054 (1934) - Great Earthquake strikes Nepal.
1061 (1941) - Four martyrs executed by the Rana regime.
1071 (1951) - Revolution topples Rana regime and establishes democracy.
1080 (1960) - Parliamentary system abolished and Panchayat system established.
1111 (1991) - First parliamentary election held after abolition of Panchayat and reinstatement of democracy.
1121 (2001) - The king, queen and other members of the royal family are killed in Nepali royal massacre.
1128 (2008) - Nepal becomes a republic.

== Gallery ==
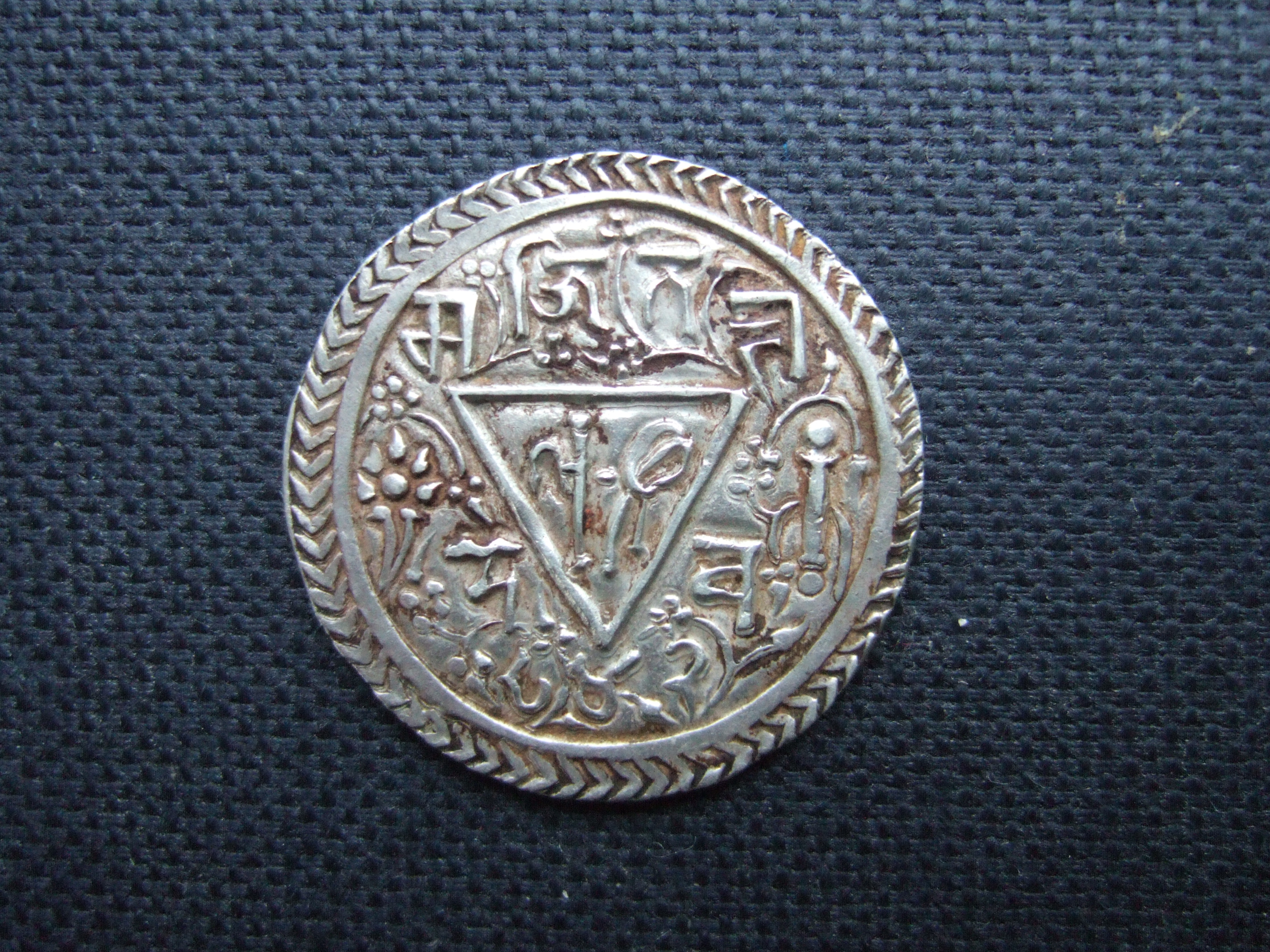
Coin issued in the name of King Ranajit Malla dated Nepal Era 842 (1722 CE)

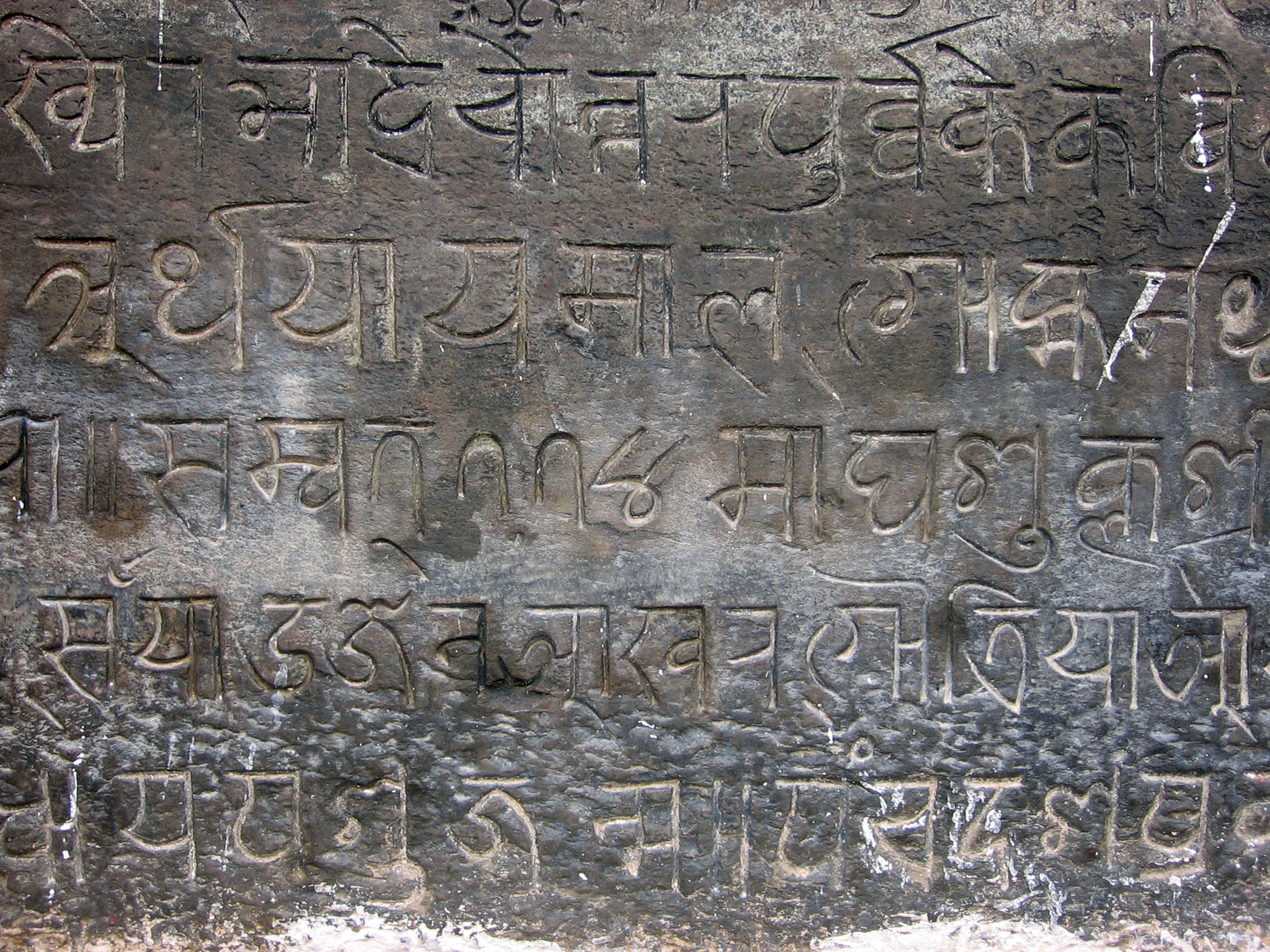
King Pratap Malla's inscription at Durbar Square dated Nepal Era 774 (1654 CE)

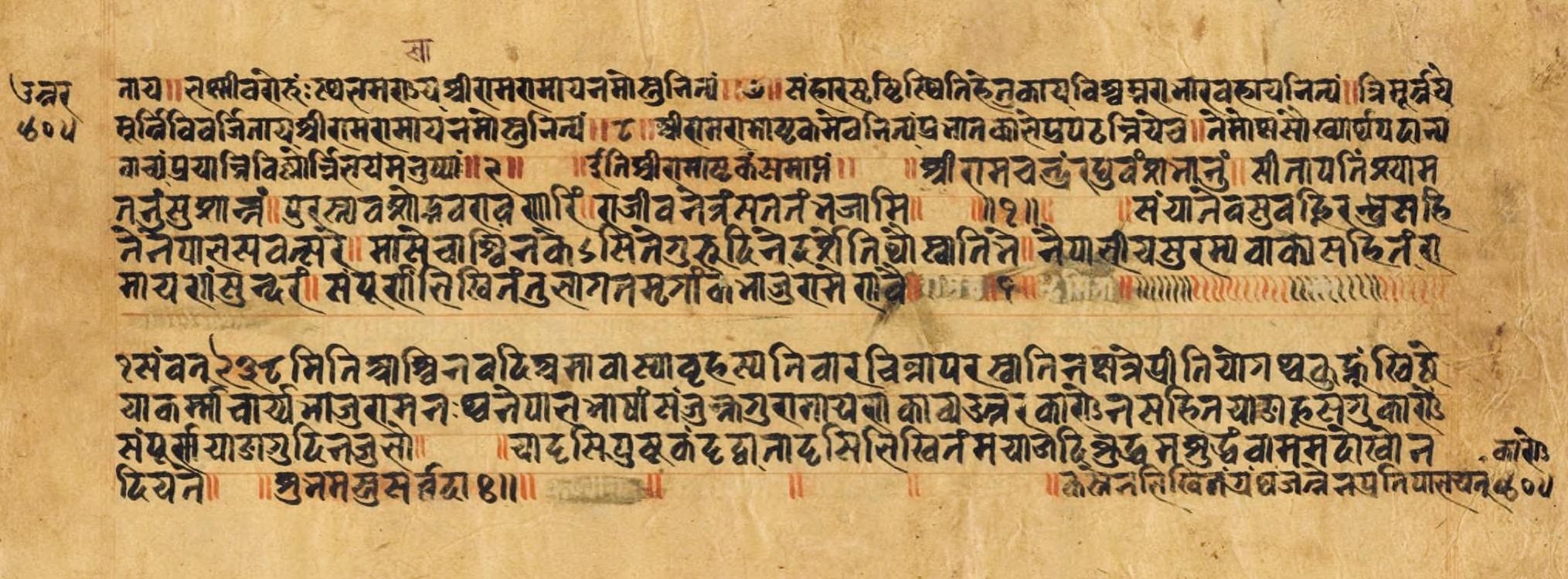
Nepalbhasa Ramayana manuscript dated to Nepal Era 938 (1818 CE)

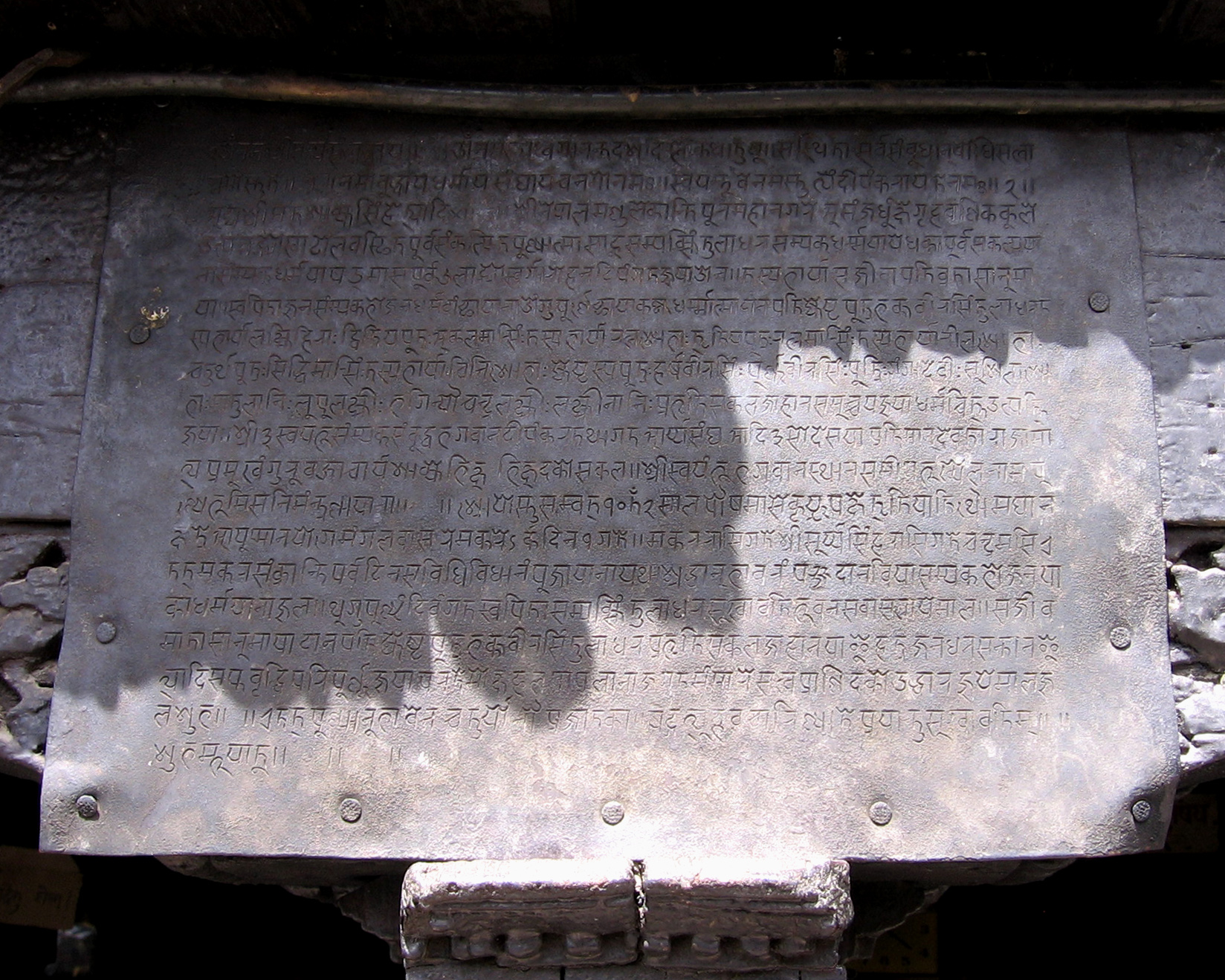
Copper plate inscription dated Nepal Era 1072 (1952 CE)

== See also ==
- Vikram Samvat
- Mha Puja
- Swanti (festival)
- Lunar calendar
- Lunar phase
