= Gaturro: The Movie =

- Theatrical release poster
- Directed by: Gustavo Cova
- Screenplay by: Hernán Dzwonik; Esteban Garrido; Adriana Lorenzón; Mariano Podesta; Belén Wedeltoft; Valeria Gómez
- Based on: Gaturro by Nik
- Produced by: Fernando de Fuentes S. José C. García de Letona; P. Jayakumar; José Luis Massa
- Starring: Mariano Chiesa; Agustina Gonzalez Cirulnik; Agustina Crulink; Pablo Gandolfo; Leto Dugakin; Gustado Dardés; Ándres Sala Rigler; Mimicha René Sagastume; Gustavo Bonfigli; Lucila Gómez; Mara Campanelli
- Edited by: Andrés Fernández
- Music by: Eduardo Frigerio; Lolo Micucci; Federico San Millán
- Production companies: Toonz Entertainment; Illusion Studios; Ánima Estudios; Voltage Pictures
- Distributed by: Distribution Company S.A.
- Release date: September 9, 2010
- Running time: 87 minutes
- Countries: Argentina; India; Mexico
- Languages: Spanish; English
- Budget: $3.5 million
- Box office: AR$8.3 million (US$2.4 million)

Gaturro: The Movie (Gaturro, la pelicula) is a 2010 animated comedy film based on the popular Argentine comic book of the same name created by Hernán Dzwonik. The film is produced by Illusion Studios, Toonz Animation, and co-produced by Mexico's Ánima Estudios. This film is the first Indian-Latin American animated co-production.

It was released in theaters on September 9, 2010, in Argentina, where it was a major critical and commercial success, grossing a total of $8.3 million pesos (est. $0.4 million).

The film was later released in Mexico on April 27, 2012, and became a huge box-office disappointment.

The film was released direct-to-video in the United States, distributed by Viva Pictures, on February 16, 2016.

== Synopsis ==
Gaturro, an anthropomorphic cat, tries multiple attempts to win the affection of Agatha, the most unpleasant cat in Gaturro's neighborhood, who falls in love with an aristocratic cat called Max. But when Gaturro accidentally becomes famous, he and a mouse called Rat Pitt devise a plan to prevent Agatha marrying Max.

== Voice cast ==
Spanish cast

- Mariano Chiesa as Gaturro
- Agustina Cirulnik as Agatha
- Pablo Gandolfo as Rat Pit
- Leto Dugatkin as Max
- Valeria Gómez as Katy Kit
- Gustavo Dardés as Federico Michou
- Ándres Sala Rigler as Mimicha
- René Sagastume as Alplato
- Gustavo Bonfigli as Daniel
- Lucila Gómez as Luz
- Mara Campanelli as Agustín

English cast

- Todd Doldersum as Gaturro / Daniel / Announcer
- Caitlin O'Reilly as Agatha / Valeria / Luz / Informetti / Gatalina Jolie
- Marty Stelnick as Max / Rat Pit / Gatulongo / Alplato / Robot
- Victoria Shepherd as Katy Kit / Mimicha / Stylist

The English-language version was found in the special features in the Argentine and Mexican DVD releases.

== Cultural references ==
This film makes a number of references to popular Hollywood figures and movies.

== Production ==
The character designs and post-production services were done by Toonz India Ltd based in Trivandrum, India, while the majority of the animation was done by Illusion Studios in Argentina. The film's special effects and backgrounds were done by Ánima Estudios in Mexico.

An animator who worked in 2008 on the film criticized the film for having a "bad script" with many spelling mistakes. He confirmed that there was no script for the movie then and the animators had to work out the details using only a script outline. He added however that the film was "visually correct" for kids.

== Release ==
This film was released in 2D and 3D in Argentina on September 9, 2010. Santo Domingo Films released the film in Mexico on April 27, 2012.

=== Box office ===
It became a box office success in Argentina, opening #1 at the domestic box-office, grossing $2,268,283 pesos (US$460,098). It held the record as one of the biggest box-office openings in the Argentinian cinema history The film grossed a total of $10,342,696 pesos ($2,097,910 USD).

On 16 April 2015, Animation World Network has announced that Viva Pictures has picked up the distribution rights for a United States release. Victor Elizalde, president of Viva Pictures said, "The landscape for quality animated content is changing quickly and Imira is in leading the way by using globally recognized brands like Speed Racer and Gaturro along with visually stimulating animation."
