= Ganga Rani =

Ganga Devi
- Queen of Bhaktapur

Queen of Bhaktapur
- Reign: 1560 – c. 1620
- Predecessor: Vishva Malla
- Successor: Trailokya Malla
- Co-ruler(s): Trailokya Malla; Tribhuvan Malla

Queen consort of Bhaktapur
- Tenure: ? – 1560
- Born: Thimi, Kingdom of Bhaktapur, Nepal (according to folklore) (Present day Bagmati Province, Nepal)
- Died: sometime after Feb. 1619; Bhaktapur, Nepal
- Spouse: Vishva Malla
- Issue: Trailokya Malla; Tribhuvana Malla
Regnal name
- Sri Sri Jaya Ganga Rani Devi Thakurini
- Dynasty: Malla (by marriage)

Ganga Rani (Nepal Bhasa: 𑐐𑑄𑐐𑐵 𑐬𑐵𑐣𑐷 ) or Ganga Maharani, also known as Ganga Devi was a queen of Bhaktapur; first as the queen consort of Vishva Malla, and later as the queen regnant who took control of the throne and alongside her two sons co-ruled the Kingdom of Bhaktapur for a significant time.

Ganga Rani made both her sons Tribhuvana and Trailokya the co-kings of Bhaktapur. Ganga Rani was first a regent for her two sons, but later became the co-ruler or ruling queen of Bhaktapur. She is credited with unifying the kingdom under a single monarch by seizing powers from the cadet branches of Yaksha Malla. During her reign, the Kingdom of Banepa, which included Banepa, Panauti, Dhulikhel, Nala was annexed into the Kingdom of Bhaktapur. The locals of Lubhu believe her to be the founder of their city, although the antiquity of the city can be dated before her reign. She is also credited with fortifying the city of Sankhu. The locals believed her to be a pious leader. She was referred to as "Ganga Maharani". Her younger son Tribhuvana Malla died on 24 January 1598.

Her last reference found till date is from an inscription at Bhaktapur dated to NS 741 Magha Purnima (17 February 1620) which mentions her as the ruler of Bhaktapur alongside her son. There is one other palm leaf manuscript dated to 1672 (NS 792) which mentions Ganga Rani's donation of 3 km^{2} of land for funding a Guthi for the maintenance of Balkumari temple in Thimi which Historian Yogesh Raj posits was either a dating error or the scribe was referring to her donation during her reign.

== In Culture ==
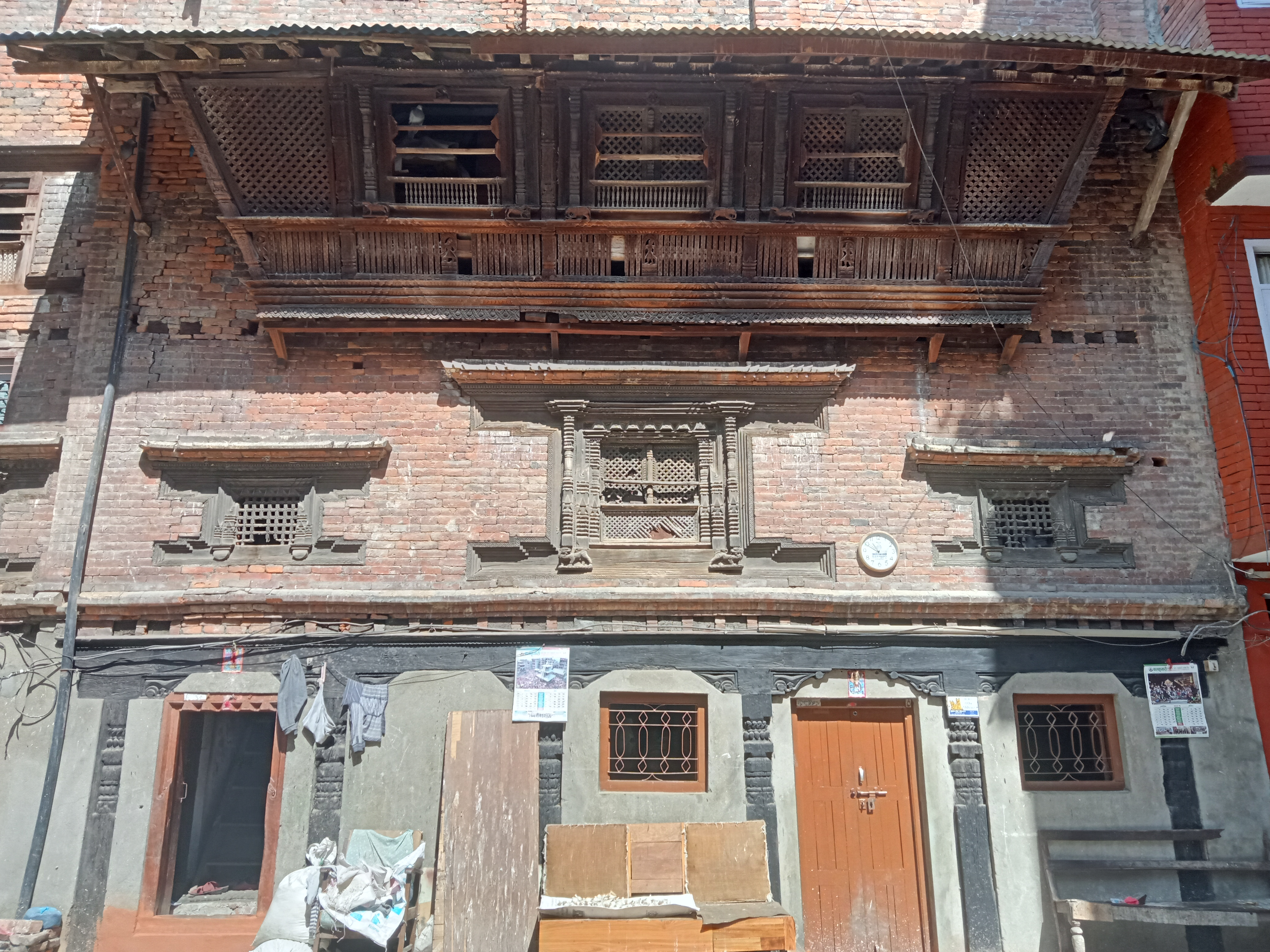
The house of Ganga Rani, located in Thimi, where the locals believe she was born.

The priests of the Taleju Temple at the former palace of Bhaktapur still annually recite Sanskrit stotras which eulogize Ganga Rani and her tutelary goddess.

During the annual spring festival of Mahalaxmi in Lubhu, a woman is chosen as a surrogate for Ganga Rani, locally referred as bhasare (Nepal Bhasa: भसारे), who formally starts the festival.

Ganga Rani is highly eulogized in the local folklore of Bhaktapur and Thimi, more so than any other ruler. The locals of Thimi believe that Ganga Rani was born on the city and even today there exists a home where she is believed to have been born.

Historian Purushottam Shrestha theorizes that the folklore of Tulā Rāni (Nepal Bhasa: 𑐟𑐸𑐮𑐵 𑐬𑐵𑐣𑐷 lit. 'queen weighing a tola') was inspired by Ganga Rani. According to the local folklore, Tula Rani was a queen of Bhaktapur during the Licchavi Dynasty who only weighed 11 grams (or one tola) and therefore could walk on water. Tula Rani is believed to have created a canal that brought water to the city's hiti system, the latter of which she built one in each of the city's district. Historian Shrestha theorizes because during her rule, Ganga Rani was believed to have constructed many of the city's hiti and canal system that fed them, the folklore of Tula Rani was inspired by her.

Ganga Rani is believed to have built many communal resting places (Nepal Bhasa: phalca) and cremation sites in the city of Panauti.

Ganga Rani and her husband Vishva Malla is credited with improving the annual spring festival of Biska Jatra, including introducing the chariot festival of Bhairava and his consort Bhadrakali in Bhaktapur.
