= Sherlock Films =

Film production company

- Type: Private
- Genre: Motion picture
- Founded: 1997
- Headquarters: Madrid, Spain, Spain
- Website: sherlockfilms.com

Sherlock Films is a Spanish film production company.

== Films ==
=== 2011 ===
- Kerity, La Casa de los Cuentos (Eleanor's Secret) (Gaumont / Haut et Court / GKIDS)
- L'Illusionniste (The Illusionist) (Pathé / Sony Pictures Classics / Warner Bros. France)
- De Cintura para Arriba (From the Waist Up) (Intra Movies / Rai Cinema / 01 Distribution)
- El Hombre Cerilla (Man Match)
- La Bendición de la Tierra (The Blessing of Earth) (Real Port)
- El Verano de Martino (Martino Summer) (Rai Trade / Rai Cinema / Moviemento Film)
- Pánico en la Granja (Called Panic) (Gebeka Films / Made In Films)
- Miradas de Amor (Looks of Love) (Intra Movies)

=== 2012 ===
- Obsession (Gaumont)
- Abbott y Costello Contra los Fantasmas (Abbott and Costello Meet Frankenstein) (Universal Pictures)
- Don Gato y su Pandilla (Top Cat: The Movie) (Warner Bros. Mexico / Ánima Estudios / Illusion Studios / Motion Pictures S.A. / Vertigo Films)
- Inmaduros (Immatures) (Intra Movies / Lotus Production)
- Adam Resucitado (Adam Resurrected) (Bleiberg Entertainment)
