= The Legend of Shankhadhar =

- Nepali: शंखधरया बाखं
- Directed by: Sanyukta Shrestha
- Story by: Sanyukta Shrestha
- Based on: Sankhadhar Sakhwa
- Produced by: Sanyukta Shrestha Co. Producer Shashidhar Manandhar; Lochan Manandhar; Mahanta Shrestha
- Starring: Rajaram Poudel; Madan Krishna Shrestha; Kiran K.C; Madan Das Shrestha
- Narrated by: Nisha Deshar
- Edited by: Sanyukta Shrestha
- Music by: Bishwo Shahi
- Production company: Yantrakala Studios Pvt Ltd
- Release date: 17 December 2016 (Nepal)
- Running time: 55 Minutes
- Country: Nepal
- Language: Nepali
- Budget: 45,000 GBP

The Legend of Shankhadhar (Nepali: शंखधरको कथा/शंखधरया बाखँ)is the first Nepalese feature animation movie also known as TLOS, directed by Nepalese animator Sanyukta Shrestha, produced by Sanyukta Shrestha along with co-producers Shashidhar Manandhar, Lochan Manandhar and Mahanta Shrestha.

The animation team: Sanyukta Shrestha, Anjana Shrestha, Niyukta Shrestha, supported by Bigyan Prajapati and Prajnal Kakshepati.

The Legend of Shankhadhar showcases the story about Nepalese hero Sankhadhar Saakhwa and how he had started the Nepal Sambat. This movie features the relation between Nepal's cities Kathmandu and Bhaktapur. It also features Nepal's devastating earthquake of April 2015 Nepal.

The Legend of Shankhadhar first premiered in United Kingdom, London at Greenford Town Hall, brought by Yantrakala studios. After the success of the premier, Yantrakala studios have ventured on a worldwide screening in different cites around the Globe.

== Plot ==
Shankhadhar catches sight of the porters and is surprised to see the two excavating sand from the river early in the morning. He encounters them again, while they are resting at a sattal—their kharpans stacked with sand lying next to them. When Shankhadhar inquires into where they are hauling the sand to, they inform him of their destination: Bhaktapur. Intrigued further, Shankhadhar invites them to his home and coaxes them to leave the sand there and to excavate another batch from the river to take to Bhaktapur, which they willingly do.

A woman in Kathmandu who is unable to pay off a merchant’s debt. As a result, she is publicly humiliated on the streets privy to all. This sight weighs heavy on Shankhadhar’s mind and is seared into his memory. Meanwhile, in Bhaktapur, a famed astrologer, Siddhiwant Joshi, predicts that the sand brought from the Bishnumati River, at an auspicious time he has picked out, will turn into gold. Taking his advice, the king of Bhaktapur commands two porters to travel to Kathmandu to bring the sand as prescribed, but keeps its purpose a secret.

In one of those sites, a child asks a mother if everything the earthquake destroyed can be rebuilt. The mother then recants the story of Shankhadhar who did the seemingly impossible some 1137 years ago.

== Cast ==
- Rajaram Poudel as Vocals
- Madan Krishna Shrestha as Siddhiwant Joshi
- Kiran K.C. as Vocals
- Madan Das Shrestha as Vocals

In the movie, Siddhiwant Joshi’s voice has been lent by comedy king Madan Krishna Shrestha, and that of Bhaktapur’s king Ananda Dev by Madan Das Shrestha. The two porters have been voiced by popular artists Rajaram Poudel and Kiran KC. Similarly, the lead character has been played by Suraj Bajracharya, while Sunita Rajbhandari ‘Junu’ and Shlesha Shrestha have lent their voices to the narrating mother and the daughter.

== Production ==
=== Development ===
The Legend of Shankhadhar was first announced in August 2016. The director of The Legend of Shankhadhar "we made this movie to teach Nepalese people about our history in animation which can attract children to learn more about Nepal." With a few people working movie it took few month to complete this film and film uses voices from popular Nepalese actor and comedians listed in cast.

== Reception ==
This film has received positive feedback from Nepalese audience and international audience. After receiving so many positive feedback from the audience they have decided to do a world tour with this movie.

== Soundtrack ==
No.	Title	Singer(s)	Length
1.	"Dyo Hey Kha"	Nisha Deshar	6:15
Total length:			6:15

The music is by Bishwo Shahi and vocals by Nisha Desar, while dance direction is by Sunita Rajbhandari.
