= Eva from Argentina =

- Directed by: María Seoane
- Written by: Carlos Castro; Graciela Maglie; Omar Quiroga; María Seoane
- Produced by: Solveig Madsen; José Luis Mazza
- Starring: Francisco Solano López; Carlos Portaluppi; Carlos Russo
- Edited by: Lucas Barriaga
- Production company: Illusion Studios
- Distributed by: Azpeitia Cine
- Release date: October 20, 2011 (Buenos Aires)
- Running time: 75 minutes
- Country: Argentina
- Language: Spanish

Eva from Argentina (Spanish: Eva de la Argentina) is a 2011 Argentine flash animated biographical film, produced by Illusion Studios.

The film narrates the story of Eva Perón from Walsh's perspective.

== Cast ==
- Francisco Solano López as Himself
- Carlos Portaluppi as Rodolfo Walsh
- Carlos Russo as Juan Perón
- María Seoane (Director)
