= Salyankot =

Salyankot सल्यानकोट
- Village development committee
- Location in Nepal
- Coordinates: 28.03°N 84.89°E
- Country: Nepal
- Zone: Bagmati Zone
- District: Dhading District

Population (1991)
  - Total: 4,951
  - Religions: Hindu
- Time zone: UTC+5:45 (Nepal Time)

Salyankot is a village development committee in Dhading District in the Bagmati Zone of central Nepal. At the time of the 1991 Nepal census it had a population of 4951 and had 945 houses in it.
