= Gaturro =

Argentine comic strip

- Gaturro, the titular character
- Author: Cristian Dzwonik
- Website: www.gaturro.com
- Current status/schedule: Current daily & Sunday strip
- Launch date: 1993
- Syndicate(s): Andrews McMeel Syndication
- Genre: Humor

Gaturro is an Argentine comic strip created by cartoonist Cristian Dzwonik ("Nik"). The comic has been published in more than 50 books, magazines and comic volumes. An animated film of the same name was released theatrically in Argentina on September 9, 2010.

== Synopsis ==
Gaturro is a brown cat with yellow cheeks. The series is about the life of a cat, named like the strip, who is in love with another cat called Ágatha. However, she is not interested in him. Gaturro does not speak; he just thinks. In some cases, he can communicate with humans like this. However, when he communicates with his animal friends, he does speak. Among his most frequent activities, he usually walks on the roofs and goes to school.

== Characters ==
Principal characters

- Gaturro: He is an Abyssinian cat and the protagonist of the comic. He lives with his owners who have raised him since he was young. While his house is a charming place, he also enjoys roaming the rooftops of his neighborhood. Among the rooftops, Gaturro can interact with other characters from neighboring houses. Gaturro's owners send him to school every now and then, not for the education, but to get him out of the house. In school, Gaturro is a bit of a troublemaker and makes life difficult for his teacher, Ms. Ruda Vinagreti. Gaturro has also appeared dressed in formal clothes at his owner's office in some strips to issue a punchline in the form of a thought bubble, but what he does there has not really been explained.
- Ágatha: She is Gaturro's neighbor. They have known each other for a long time and the relationship has always been the same: Gaturro is totally in love with Ágatha, but she never pays him attention. She is very jealous, selfish and she wants to be the only one rejecting him.

Adoptive family

- Daniel (the father): He is Gaturro’s owner. He represents the stereotype of a father of the middle classes who, even exhausted because of work, tries to fulfill his family responsibilities. He treats Gaturro as another son. He eats a lot and tends to spend most of his time watching television on his sofa. He is noticeably overweight.
- Valeria (the mother): She is very understanding and affectionate, but also determined. She is completely dedicated to the house and the family, and she copes with stress by doing exercise or practising Feng Shui enthusiastically.
- Luz: She is the oldest daughter of the family. Her incipient adolescence turned her so capricious and stubborn that she is constantly in trouble with the family, Gaturro included.
- Agustín: He is the youngest son of the family. He seems to be the only one who treats Gaturro as a pet. He is very curious and passionate about video games.
- The twins: They are the newborn babies of Gaturro’s family, a boy and a girl.
- The mother-in-law: She is Luz and Agustín’s grandmother and Daniel’s mother-in-law. She does not live in the city but she visits the family once in a while. She speaks a lot.
- Uncle Jorge: He is Daniel’s brother; that is to say, Luz and Agustín’s uncle. Even if he has a physical resemblance with his brother, he has a least serious and thinner look. Besides, he is not stressed at all.
- The cousins: They are Luz and Agustín’s cousins, son and daughter of uncle Jorge (nearly the same age and possibly fraternal twins; their mother is never seen or alluded to). They are quite mischievous and naughty.

Biological family:

- Mamurra: She is Gaturro’s biological mother. She is overprotective with Gaturro. She always asks him to eat well, to wear sweaters, to study and to be careful.
- Gatulongo: He is one of Gaturro’s cousins. He has a very long neck. He is friendly and quiet and he is never in a hurry. It takes hours for him to answer. He does not speak a lot.
- Papurro: He is Gaturro’s father. He occasionally appears on the strip. Dynamism is not his cup of tea. He is lazy about everything.
- Abuelurra: She is Gaturro’s grandmother. Just as Mamurra, she is very overprotective with Gaturro. She is always knitting sweaters for Gaturro because she is worried about keeping him warm all the time.
- Tiurras: They are Gaturro’s aunts. They appeared in the strip on February 25, 2007 for the first time.
- Bisabuelurra: She is just like Mamurra and Abuelurra, but to a higher degree. She is the great-grandmother of Gaturro.
- Hermanurro: He appears when Gaturro introduces him to Ágatha. He is furrier and taller than Gaturro.
- Gaturrín: He is the baby of Gaturro's household, and Gaturro adopts him as a nephew. Gaturro tries to instruct Gaturrín but often ends up learning from the baby cat. He is a very good observer of reality, and the weakness of Ágatha. He is often seen sucking on his pacifier, except when he is too busy sucking on his baby bottle instead.

Cat friends

- Gateen: She is the adolescent cat of the roofs. Gateen is an authentic "teen", with all adolescent skills that can be imagined. For instance, she is a money changer and a rebel (still does not know very well why, but wants to be rebellious). She is in the age of the great changes, and it shows. Deep down, she feels that nobody understands her.
- Gaturranta: One of Gaturro’s friends that visits him once in a while. She is the opposite to Ágatha, she is nice and a good friend. She helped Gaturro to make Ágatha jealous more than once.
- Katy Kit: Gaturro showed interest in her. She says to be famous and to appear on television and in magazines. She is quite frivolous and seems to only worry about her aspect.
- Misha: She is the last cat to move into the neighborhood. She lives near Gaturro’s house. She has two little braids, she is very nice and active. She is constantly looking for new friends.
- Elizabeth: She is the wealthy cat of the neighborhood. She lives in a mansion with her own and the butler. She studied in the London Miau Institute, travelled around the world and speaks several languages. Her butler is Jaime, who she is always asking for champagne. She is very delicate, elegant and distinguished. She likes to be flattered and taken care of.
- Gaturrina: She is Gaturrín’s girlfriend. She is as little as Gaturrín.
- Gatunislao: Her name is Gatunislao García Aristizabal. He is the posh cat of the neighborhood. He has a double surname and an important lineage. He lives on appearances. He says he has several houses, cars, fields, and yachts… but he actually has none of those things.
- Gatovica: Ágatha introduced him once as her boyfriend. He is well-built and muscular, although once Ágatha touched him with her sharp nails and poked his muscles. He does not speak a lot. It is only known that he likes lifting weights.
- Malurro: He is Ágatha’s ex-boyfriend. He is really mean and does not want her at all. However, that is what Ágatha likes most of him.
- Tommy Cool: He is the coolest cat in the neighborhood. He dated Ágatha, but they broke up because he was individualistic and would only care about the new trends.
- Grasurro: He is Ágatha’s ex-boyfriend. He is a singer of romantic music.
- Gatalina Yolí: Inspired by Angelina Jolie, he is the new cat that comes to Gaturro’s neighbourhood and makes all the cats fall in love with her. She was going to marry Gaturro, but Ágatha interrupted the wedding. Gatalina wears a lot of heavy makeup.
- Gaturrón: He is very big and robust. He is Gaturro’s cousin.
- Alelí: She is one of Ágatha’s sisters. She is always saying “yes” to everything, but when Gaturro asked her out, she said no.
- Alienurro: Extraterrestrial cat who resembles Gaturro's breed. He has antennae and humanlike ears.

Animal friends

- Arañita: He is a little spider. He is one of Gaturro’s friends who usually goes down hanging in his thread to visit him. They have a physical resemblance, since both have the same cheeks.
- Ramiro: He is a mouse that lives in Gaturro’s house. Gaturro does not chase him nor haunts him. They are close friends.
- Canturro: He is the dog of the comic strip (the "can" prefix being derived from Latin canis, "dog"). Having taken the phrase "man's best friend" too much to heart, he is convinced that he is the protagonist of the strip. Believing that he looks too much like Gaturro, he undergoes cosmetic surgery to become more "doglike". With this new face, he thinks that he can appear more frightening.
- Emilio: He is the fish of the family and a friend of Gaturro and Gaturrín, who always look for a way to amuse him, although often that "fun" transforms into great "dangers" for the poor Emilio. He lives in a round fishbowl, in the living room of the house, near the armchair for the TV.
- Canario: He is a bird and a friend of Gaturro. It is owned by a neighbor of Gaturro.

== Controversy ==
For several years, there has been evidence of plagiarism in the strip, largely from Argentine artists. These cartoonists include Quino, Leo Arias, Paz y Rudy, Roberto Fontanarrosa, Caloi (Carlos Loiseau), Juan Carlos Argüelles, Lola, and in the international field, Bill Watterson and Jim Davis. Gaturro does share many similar features to Davis' Garfield, leading some to refer to the series as a bootleg.

A "black book" of NIK has been created which lists many examples of alleged plagiarism. The announcements have led the author's rejection from participating in some publications and shows.

Between July and August 2022, a statue of the character located on the Paseo de la Historieta in Buenos Aires was vandalized and later retired. Some time later, Nik announced on his Twitter account that they were preparing a new statue with "anti-vandal technology". On July 14, 2023, another statue was put in the Paseo de la Historieta; it only lasted for two days before being retired, again, due to vandalism.

On July 20, 2023 in Córdoba, a statue of Gaturro located in the Plaza de la Intendencia was inaugurated, which in less than 24 hours was vandalized, was later removed and a statue of Sonic was put in its place.

== List of books ==
- Gaturro 1 to Gaturro 42
- Gaturro a lo grande 1 to 6 (Gaturro Big Size)
- Te quiero mamá (I Love You Mom)
- Sos mi Gaturrín (You Are My Gaturrín)
- Te amo cada día más (I Love You More Each Day)
- Gaturriendo (Gatulaughing)
- Brutish English
- Te Amo (I Love You)
- Feliz Cumpleaños (Happy Birthday)
- Esta es mi oficina (This is My Office)
- Así se hace Gaturro (This is how Gaturro is Made)
- Mini Gaturro 1 to 5
