= Boogie (2009 film) =

2009 Argentine adult animated film by Gustavo Cova

- Official poster
- Directed by: Gustavo Cova
- Written by: Marcelo Paez-Cubells
- Produced by: Hugo E. Lauría; José Luis Massa
- Starring: Pablo Echarri; Nancy Dupláa; Nicolás Frías; Marcelo Armand; Rufino Gallo
- Edited by: Andrés Fernández
- Music by: Diego Monk
- Production companies: Illusion Studios; Proceso
- Distributed by: Cine Argentino; Vision Films; Cinema Epoch
- Release date: October 22, 2009
- Running time: 82 minutes
- Country: Argentina
- Language: Spanish
- Budget: $2.5 million
- Box office: $522,742

Boogie (Spanish: Boogie, el aceitoso) is a 2009 Argentine adult animated action-thriller black comedy film, based on the Argentine character Boogie, the oily by Roberto Fontanarrosa, and directed by Gustavo Cova. The voices of main characters Boogie and Marcia were performed by Pablo Echarri and Nancy Dupláa. It was the first 3D animated film made in Argentina and Latin America.

== Plot ==
Boogie meets Marcia at a bar, the girlfriend of the mafia Boss Sonny Calabria, who asks him if he finds her attractive. Boogie points that she is fat in a rude manner, and leaves. Some time later Calabria is sent to trial, threatened by the existence of a mysterious witness who could incriminate him. Calabria's people try to hire Boogie to kill that witness, but as he requests too much money they decide to hire Blackburn instead, a competitor killer. Angered by the situation, Boogie decides to kidnap the witness to force Calabria to pay him. The witness was Marcia, who had changed into a thin figure after Boogie's criticism, causing Calabria to leave her and get together with another fat woman, as he preferred fat women. Marcia falls in love with this seeming hero, despite his constant violence and lack of feelings, until she finds out his true plans. She tries to escape from him, but Boogie captures her back and negotiates giving her up to Calabria.

However, after trading her in, Boogie starts feeling guilty, and decides to go back and rescue Marcia. He decides to bring her to the trial, that was waiting for her testimony, and crosses the country at high speed. During the trial, Calabria's lawyer tries to kill Marcia but Boogie shoots him instead. Sonny summons massive numbers of hit-men who have infiltrated in the scene, but Boogie starts to kill them all. Marcia, who had so far been reluctant to Boogie's violence, takes two of his guns and starts killing as well, and ends with killing Calabria for leaving her. Boogie sees Marcia, armed with guns and all covered with blood, and falls in love with her.

Three months after the event, Marcia declares in a journal that she knows nothing from Boogie ever since, and has made out her mind that probably that was for the best, and starts thinking that Boogie might be in a war zone doing what he does best. Later on, Boogie is in a battlefield site as a mercenary, and points own M16 Service Rifle right at the camera to say "There's some for you too".

== Cast ==
- Pablo Echarri as Boogie
- Nancy Dupláa as Marcia
- Nicolás Frías as Blackburn
- Marcelo Armand as Jones
- Rufino Gallo as Sony Calabria

== Production ==
Gustavo Cova was contacted by José Luis Masa, owner of Illusion Studios, who were working in a project of the film. Roberto Fontanarrosa, creator of the character in comic strips, had read and edited a provisional script. Fontanarrosa died shortly after, but it was decided to go on with the project. Cova considered later that they could manage to make the transition from comic strips to film being loyal to the character style and the style of Fontanarrosa himself. He considered that the film would have been grotesque if it had been done with actors, but being humoristic it worked better.

The film had a cost of two and a half million of dollars.

Unlike the comic strips, which are made with short jokes, the film is not made with a series of short shots but with a big storyline, although many of the comic strips created by Fontanarrosa were included as part of the storyline. Boogie also lacks in the comic strips a female sidekick: although Marcia does exist in such media, she's just one more of many others secondary characters abused or insulted by Boogie. The Marcia character in the film collects into a single character situations of many others. She was also designed as a femme fatale, despite the lack of such characters in the work of Fontanarrosa.

== Box office ==
In Argentina, this film opened at #3 behind Surrogates and El secreto de sus ojos, earning $661,954 pesos ($125,370 USD).
