= Trailokya Malla =

- King of Bhaktapur
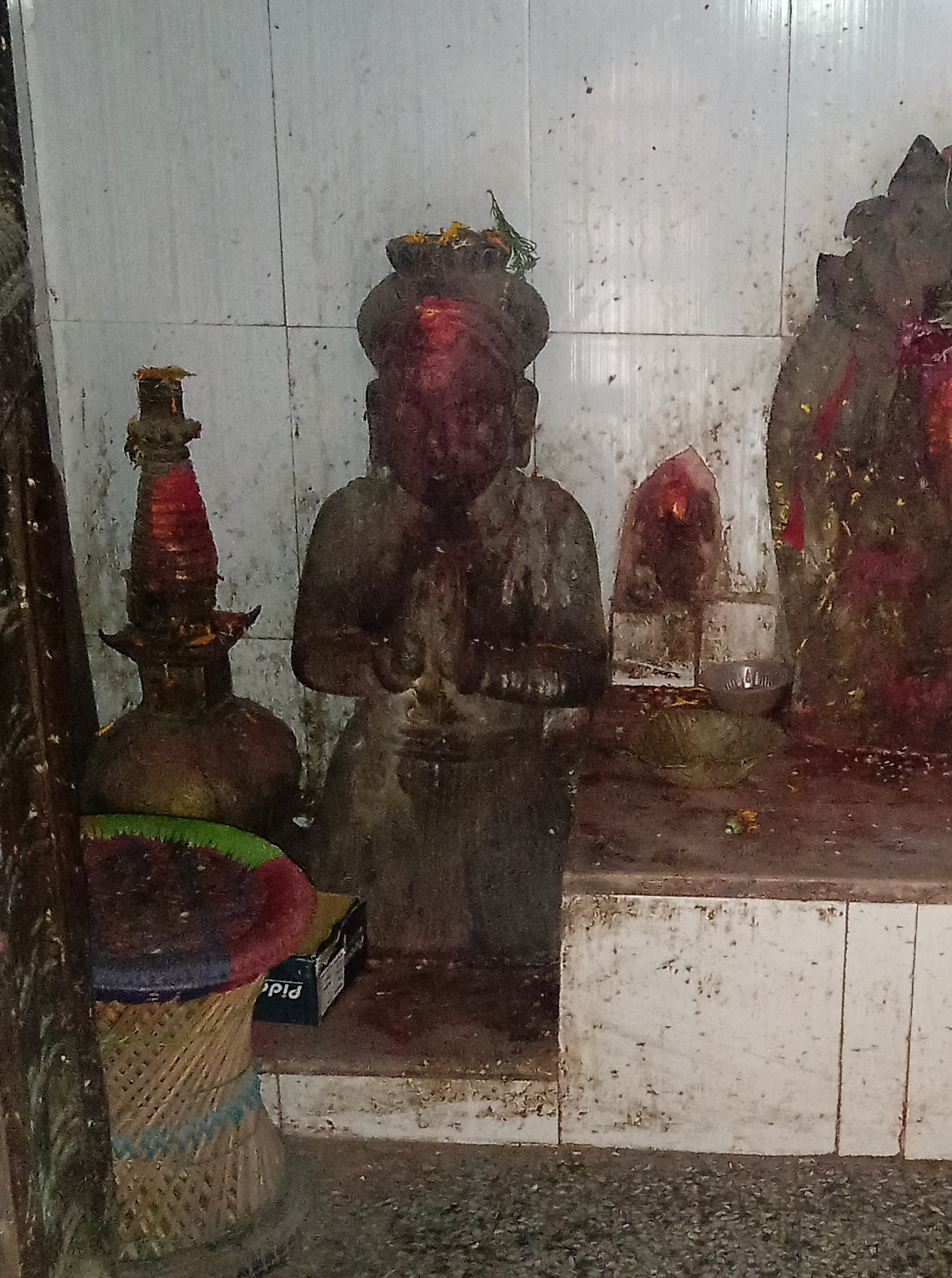
- A stone statuette at a Buddhist temple in Bhaktapur

King of Bhaktapur
- Predecessor: Vishva Malla
- Successor: Jagajjyoti Malla
- Co-ruler(s): Ganga Rani; Tribhuvan Malla
- Born: Nepal
- Died: 1613; Bhaktapur, Nepal
- Issue: Jagajjyoti Malla
- Dynasty: Malla
- Father: Vishva Malla
- Mother: Ganga Rani

Trailokya Malla (Newar: 𑐟𑑂𑐬𑐿𑐮𑑀𑐎𑑂𑐫 𑐩𑐮𑑂𑐮) was a Malla dynasty king of Bhaktapur, Nepal from 1560 to 1613.

Ganga Rani, the mother of Trailokya, made both her sons Tribhuvana and Trailokya the co-kings of Bhaktapur. Ganga Rani was first a regent for her two sons, but later became the co-ruler or ruling queen of Bhaktapur.

It is believed that Trailokya was murdered one night while taking his dinner, which had been spiked with poison.
