= Illusion Studios =

Argentine entertainment company

- Type: Sociedad Anónima
- Industry: Animation; TV shows Motion pictures
- Founded: 2001
- Headquarters: Buenos Aires, Argentina, Argentina
- Website: www.illusionstudios.com (archived)

Illusion Studios S.A. (styled as ILLUSIONSTUDIOS) is an Argentine entertainment company founded in 2001, and based in Buenos Aires, Argentina. It produces content for children and young people and is known for creating Top Cat: The Movie (Don Gato y su Pandilla), Gaturro, and Peter Punk. Since its release of Boogie, Illusion Studios becomes the first ever company in Hispanic America to release a 3D film. As of 2026, it is currently unknown what state the company is in.

== Featured media ==
=== Films ===
Title	Release date	Production company(s)	Box office
Valentina	July 10, 2008	Vision Films / telefine	$340,782
Boogie el Aceitoso	October 22, 2009	Vision Films / MTV Latin America	$2,500,000
Gaturro	September 10, 2010	Ánima Estudios / Toonz Entertainment	$2,900,000
Don Gato y su Pandilla	September 16, 2011 (Mexico); June 1, 2012 (United Kingdom); June 22, 2012 (Spain); August 22, 2012 (Australia); November 9, 2012 (India); August 2, 2013 (United States)	Warner Bros. / Ánima Estudios / Vertigo Films (UK) / Lightning Entertainment / Sherlock Films (Spain) / Star Entertainment (India)	$15,066,652
Eva de la Argentina	2011	Azpeitia Cine	N/A

=== TV shows ===
Title	Original run	Production company(s)
La Maga y el Camino al Dorado	2008–2009	Nickelodeon Latin America / Dori Media Group
Doodlebops Rockin' Road Show!	2010-2011	Cookie Jar Entertainment / Optix
Sueña Conmigo	2010–2011	Nickelodeon Latin America / Televisa
Peter Punk	2010–2012	Disney Channel Latin America

=== Other ===
Title	Type of media	Date
Dubal	Internet series	2008
Allison	Erotic comic	2009

== Co-producers ==
The company also made alliances with the following companies:

Company name	Country of origin	Shows/Films
Nickelodeon Latin America	United States; Mexico; Central America; South America	La Maga y el Camino al Dorado; Sueña Conmigo
Disney Channel Latin America	United States; Mexico; Central America; South America	Peter Punk
Ánima Estudios	Mexico	Gaturro; Top Cat: The Movie
Vision Films	United States	Valentina; Boogie
Toonz Entertainment	Singapore; India	Gaturro
OPTIX Entertainment	Canada	Doodlebops Rockin' Road Show!
Dori Media Group	Argentina; Israel	La Maga y el Camino Dorado
Proceso	Mexico	Boogie
