= Cristian Dzwonik =

Argentine cartoonist and serial plagiarist

Nik
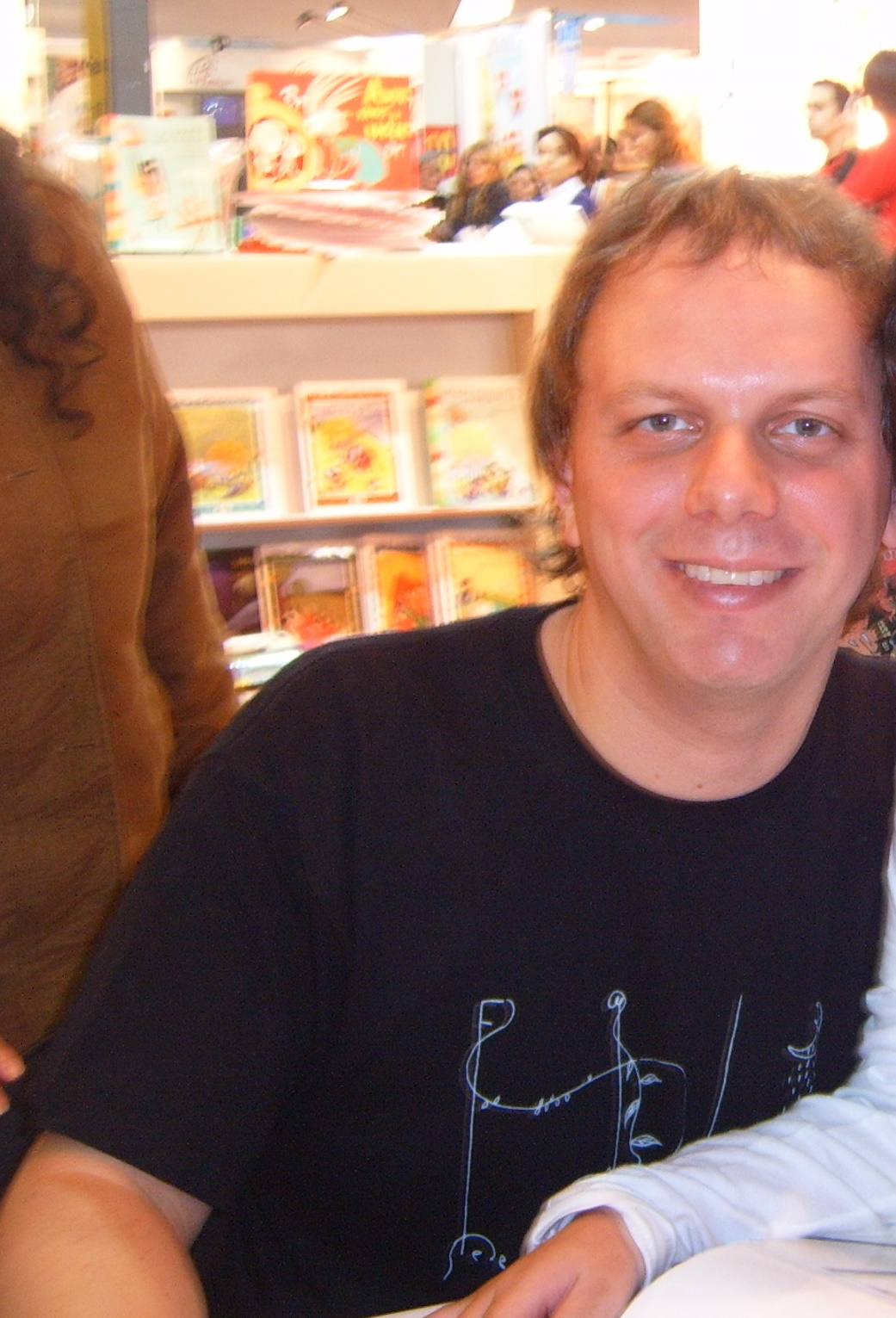
- Born: Cristian Dzwonik; 18 March 1971 (age 54); Buenos Aires, Argentina
- Occupation: Cartoonist
- Known for: Gaturro comic strip (1993–present)
- Awards: 2002 Platinum Konex award, SIP prize

Cristian Gustavo Dzwonik (born 18 March 1971 in Buenos Aires), better known by his pseudonym Nik, is a cartoonist from Argentina, creator of Gaturro, and current cartoonist in the paper La Nación. He received the 2002 Konex Platinum Award for Best cartoonist, and four times the prize SIP (Sociedad Interamericana de Prensa). His works have been published throughout Latin America, the United States, Spain and France.

Nik has been accused multiple times of plagiarising works from other cartoonists/artists, and there is strong evidence of his plagiarism of the works of cartoonists Quino, Caloi, Fontanarrosa, and Claudio Kappel among others.
