= Who Killed Bambi? (2013 film) =

- Film poster
- Spanish: ¿Quién mató a Bambi?
- Directed by: Santi Amodeo
- Screenplay by: Santi Amodeo
- Based on: Matando cabos by Tony Dalton, Alejandro Lozano, and Kristoff Raczyñski
- Produced by: Joaquín Padró; Mar Targarona
- Starring: Quim Gutiérrez; Julián Villagrán; Enrico Vecchi; Clara Lago; Úrsula Corberó; Ernesto Alterio
- Cinematography: Álex Catalán
- Edited by: Joan Manel Vilaseca
- Music by: Enrique de Justo; Santi Amodeo
- Production companies: Quién Mató a Bambi AIE; Rodar y Rodar y Rodar
- Distributed by: Sony Pictures Releasing España
- Release date: 15 November 2013
- Running time: 86 minutes
- Country: Spain
- Language: Spanish
- Box office: €851,988

Who Killed Bambi? (Spanish: ¿Quién mató a Bambi?) is a 2013 Spanish comedy film written and directed by Santi Amodeo, which stars Quim Gutiérrez, Julián Villagrán, Enrico Vecchi, Clara Lago, Úrsula Corberó, and Ernesto Alterio. It is a remake of the 2004 Mexican film Matando cabos.

== Plot ==
The fiction takes place in Seville. Two young friends live an unusual adventure: they have to find the way in which the President of the company where they work (and father-in-law of one of the two), returns safe and sound home by strange circumstances. He is found half-naked locked in the trunk of his car. At the same time, a businessman drowning in debt and his partner attempt to carry out an express kidnapping, although, by a series of unfortunate coincidences, they end up sequestering their father by mistake. From there, the problems just begin.

== Cast ==
- Quim Gutiérrez as David
- Ernesto Alterio as Edu
- Julián Villagrán as Mudo
- Pedro Mari Sánchez as Larrea
- Enrico Vecchi as Gigi
- Úrsula Corberó as Paula
- Joaquín Núñez as Adelardo
- Clara Lago as Mati
- Carmina Barrios as Tere
- Belén Ponce de León as Gabi
- José Ángel Egido as Ramón
- Pedro Mari Sánchez as Larrea
- Antonio Estrada as Mayordomo
- Paco Moreno as Bambi
- Manolo Solo
- Andrés Iniesta

== Production ==
The film is a remake of the 2004 Mexican film Matando cabos. It is a Quién Mató a Bambi AIE and Rodar y Rodar (Mar Targarona and Joaquín Padró) production, with the participation of TVE, AXN, and TVC. It boasted a budget of around €2.5 million. Filming began in Seville on 4 February 2013.

== Release ==
Distributed by Sony Pictures, the film was theatrically released in Spain on 15 November 2013.

== See also ==
- List of Spanish films of 2013
