= MTV Movie Awards Mexico 2005 =

The MTV Movie Awards Mexico 2005 was hosted by Ilana Sod.

== Winners and nominees ==
=== Favorite Movie ===
- Matando Cabos
- Puños Rosas
- Temporada de patos

=== Favorite Actor ===
- Adal Ramones as Alvaro - Puños Rosas
- Diego Cataño as Moko - Temporada de patos
- Jaime Camil as Eufemio - Zapata: El sueño de un héroe
- Tony Dalton as Jaque - Matando Cabos

=== Favorite Actress ===
- Cecilia Suárez as Alicia - Puños Rosas
- Danny Perea as Rita - Temporada de patos
- Elizabeth Valdéz as Diana - Las Lloronas
- Francesca Guillén as Matilda - Santos Peregrinos

=== Best Song from a Movie ===
- "El Pato" — Natalia y la Forquetina (Temporada de patos)
- "Más Caliente Que El Sol" — Fobia (Matando Cabos)
- "Nalguita" — Plastilina Mosh (Puños Rosas)
- "Un Héroe Real" — Aleks Syntek (Robots)

=== Favorite Voice from an Animated Movie ===
- Aleks Syntek as Rodney - Robots
- Ely Guerra as Grace - Home on the Range
- Eugenio Derbez as Donkey - Shrek 2
- Víctor Trujillo as Bob - The Incredibles

=== Most Bizariest Sex ===
- Jacqueline Voltaire and Silverio Palacios - Matando Cabos
- Carmen Salinas and Javier de Rivera - Santos Peregrinos
- Lucero and Alejandro Fernández - Zapata: El sueño de un héroe

=== Best Trio for a Movie ===
- Anahí, Dulce María and Jolette - Rebeldía Académica
- Lorena Herrera, Ninel Conde and Sergio Mayer - Sólo para Adultos
- Libertad, Sabrina and Luis Felipe Tovar - Un Mundo Raro

== Legend Award ==
- Xavier López
