= Sultanes del Sur =

Sultans of South
- Directed by: Alejandro Lozano
- Written by: Tony Dalton
- Produced by: Marco Polo Constandse; Billy Rovzar; Fernando Rovzar
- Starring: Tony Dalton; Ana de la Reguera; Jordi Mollá; Silverio Palacios
- Cinematography: Juan Jose Saravia
- Edited by: Luis de la Madrid
- Music by: Xavier Capellas
- Distributed by: Warner Bros. Pictures
- Release date: December 21, 2007 (Mexico)
- Countries: Mexico; Argentina; Spain
- Language: Spanish

Sultans of the South is a Mexican action film from 2007 directed by Alejandro Lozano.

This is the second film by Lozano after Killing Cabos three years earlier. It was made with the same production team and under the same idea of tackling the action genre and refreshing it with a new twist in the Mexican cinema, which had moved away from action movies in the last two decades.

== Data ==
- The locations south Sultans were in Buenos Aires.
- The advertising slogan was: Stealing $12 million easy. Surviving to spend it, not so much.

== Plot ==
The story begins with a robbery taking place in Mexico City. The band consists of Carlos, Leonardo, Monica and Leserio had agreed to travel to Argentina to launder money. Arriving in Buenos Aires are in a mob war in which someone takes the opportunity to steal the money and have to recover and give to those who wait.

== Cast ==
- Tony Dalton as Carlos Sanchez.
- Jordi Molla as Leonardo Batiz.
- Ana de la Reguera as Monica Silvari.
- Silverio Palacios as Leserio Domínguez.
- Erick Luis as Mario.
- Celso Bugallo as El Tejano
