= ¿Y cómo es él? =

¿Y cómo es él? may refer to:

- ¿Y cómo es él? (song), a 1982 song by José Luis Perales
- ¿Y cómo es él? (film), a 2022 Mexican romantic comedy film
