= Juan José Saravia =

Mexican cinematographer (born 1969)

- Born: Juan José Saravia; October 8, 1969 (age 56); Mexico City, Mexico
- Education: Active School of Photography; Ibero-American University
- Occupation: Cinematographer
- Years active: 1992–present
- Organization: Mexican Society of Cinematographers
- Awards: Silver Goddess Award for Best Cinematography; 2005 Matando Cabos

Juan José Saravia, AMC, (born October 8, 1969) is a Mexican cinematographer known for being one of the pioneers in the research, use, training, and development of digital cinematographic technology in Mexico, as well as in research and experimentation in cinematography, animation, and interactive media. He has taught courses and workshops at various universities and film schools throughout the Mexican territory.

Born in Mexico City, he studied the technical career of photography at the Active School of Photography in Mexico City and has a degree in communication with a specialization in cinematography from the Ibero-American University.

In 2004, Saravia became member of the Mexican Society of Cinematographers (AMC), and, by 2009, founded and edited the magazine 23.98 fotogramas por segundo, a publication of the AMC that is still being published as of 2020. From 2007 to 2013, he served as vice president in function of a presidency with cinematographers Carlos R. Diazmuñoz Cerdán and Oscar Hijuelos. He then became president of the society until 2016. Saravia has been nominated for two Silver Goddess Awards, winning one of them in 2005 for the film Matando Cabos (2004).

He is currently attached to La venganza del Mascarita, the sequel to Matando Cabos, directed by Alejandro Lozano.

== Filmography ==
Film

| Year | Title | Director | Notes |
|---|---|---|---|
| 1995 | Las nueve caras del miedo | Christian González | |
| 1995 | La ley del cholo | Christian González | |
| 2004 | Matando Cabos | Alejandro Lozano | Silver Goddess Award for Best Cinematography |
| 2007 | Sultanes del Sur | Alejandro Lozano | |
| 2011 | This Is Not a Movie | Olallo Rubio | |
| 2011 | The Last Death | David Ruiz | |
| 2012 | Ventanas al mar | Jesús Mario Lozano | |
| 2012 | Richness of Internal Space | Kai Parlange Tessmann | |
| 2012 | La mala luz | Tony Wakefield | |
| 2013 | Panic 5 Bravo | Kuno Becker | |
| 2014 | Short Plays | 28 directors | Co-cinematographer with Simon Brauer and Emmanuel Trousse |
| 2017 | Tigers Are Not Afraid | Issa López | Nominated – Silver Goddess Award for Best Cinematography |
| 2019 | Tod@s caen | Ariel Winograd | |

Short films

| Year | Title | Director | Notes |
|---|---|---|---|
| 1992 | Beltrán | Rolando Cuevas | Co-cinematographer with Mark Liwerant |
| 1994 | El club de los 40 millones de jodidos | Gustavo Loza | |
| 1995 | Rota | Laura Arnaiz | Documentary short |
| 1996 | Avalon | Lorenzo Hagerman | |
| 1997 | La Divina Máquina de hacer Música | Jose Ramon Pedroza | Documentary short Co-cinematographer with Juan Carlos Garcia Mata |
| 2001 | Santo al Cielo | J.K. | |
| 2002 | Guzman Huerta | Alejandro Lozano; Pepe Castro; Juan Jose Saravia | Co-director |
| 2005 | Por eso no tienes novio | Alejandro Lozano | |
| 2006 | Feliz cumpleaños | Everardo Gout | |
| 2009 | Passage | Shekhar Kapur | Camera Operator |
| 2012 | Soy Veracruz | Daniel Gruener | Documentary Short |
| 2012 | Soy Guanajuato | Daniel Gruener | Documentary Short |
| 2012 | Soy Guerrero Ana Serradilla | Daniel Gruener | Documentary Short |
| 2012 | Soy chiapas | Paco Alvarez; Daniel Gruener | Documentary Short |
| 2013 | Soy Nuevo Leon | Daniel Gruener | Documentary Short |
| 2013 | Yo Descubrí Yucatán | Daniel Gruener | |
| 2015 | Chayanne: Madre Tierra (oye) | Paco Alvarez; Daniel Gruener | |
| 2016 | Deja que el mundo ruede | Rodrigo Fiallega; Mario Carvajal; Carlos Terán | Video Short |
| 2017 | Lime Ice Cream | Romina Serna | |

Television

| Year | Title | Notes |
|---|---|---|
| 2007 | Trece Miedos | 2 episodes |
| 2008-2009 | Los simuladores | 5 episodes |
| 2010-2016 | Los Héroes del Norte | Unknown episodes |
| 2016–present | Top Chef Mexico | Unknown episodes |
| 2016 | Esta Noche con Arath | Unknown episodes |
| 2020 | Control Z | Unknown episodes |
