= Overboard (2018 film) =

2018 film by Rob Greenberg

- Theatrical release poster
- Directed by: Rob Greenberg
- Screenplay by: Bob Fisher; Rob Greenberg; Leslie Dixon
- Based on: Overboard by Leslie Dixon
- Produced by: Eugenio Derbez; Benjamin Odell; Bob Fisher
- Starring: Eugenio Derbez; Anna Faris; Eva Longoria; Mel Rodriguez; Cecilia Suárez; Mariana Treviño; Fernando Luján; John Hannah
- Cinematography: Michael Barrett
- Edited by: Lee Haxall
- Music by: Lyle Workman
- Production companies: Metro-Goldwyn-Mayer Pictures; Pantelion Films; 3Pas Studios
- Distributed by: Lionsgate
- Release date: May 4, 2018
- Running time: 112 minutes
- Country: United States
- Language: English
- Budget: $12 million
- Box office: $91.2 million

Overboard is a 2018 American romantic comedy film directed by Rob Greenberg, who wrote the screenplay with Bob Fisher and Leslie Dixon. A characteristically-reversed remake of the original 1987 film (also scripted by Dixon), the film stars Eugenio Derbez, Anna Faris, and Cecilia Suárez (in the Goldie Hawn, Kurt Russell, and Edward Herrmann roles, respectively). Eva Longoria and John Hannah co-star.

It follows Kate, a struggling working-class single mother who convinces Leo, an amnesiac playboy, that the two of them are married.

Overboard was released in the United States on May 4, 2018, and grossed $91 million worldwide against a budget of $12 million. The film received unfavorable reviews from critics, who praised Faris' comedic performance but criticized the story as mediocre and failing to distinguish itself from the original.

== Plot ==
Kate Sullivan is a widowed single mother of three daughters who works two jobs while studying to be a nurse. Assigned to clean carpets on a yacht owned by spoiled, arrogant playboy Leonardo 'Leo' Montenegro, he makes rude remarks to her, firing her without pay when she refuses to bring him food. When Kate calls out his behavior, he pushes her off the boat with the expensive cleaning equipment.

Meanwhile, in Mexico, Leo's younger sisters Magdalena and Sofia are tending to their ailing father, who announces Leo as his successor to run their company. That night, Leo accidentally slips off the yacht and falls into the ocean unnoticed. Waking up on a beach with amnesia and no recollection of his identity, he wanders through town and is eventually brought to the hospital.

Magdalena finds Leo in the hospital, but leaves him there unclaimed after learning of his amnesia. She returns home with an urn filled with ashes from a campsite grill. She falsely reports Leo was killed by a shark, as she intends to take over the family company herself.

Kate and her friend Theresa see a news report on Leo's amnesia. To compensate her for his earlier misdeeds, taking advantage of his amnesia, they make him believe he is married to Kate. To convince Leo of the ruse, she correctly identifies a tattoo of Speedy Gonzales on his rear, a detail she had seen on the yacht. Kate takes him home and introduces him to her girls, making up details about their alleged life together. She sets him up with an exhausting construction job with Theresa's husband Bobby.

Leo eventually bonds with the girls. Kate begins to feel guilty and considers telling him the truth, but changes her mind after seeing how much her daughters enjoy having him around. Instead, they spend the evening celebrating Kate's new revelation: it is their anniversary.

The next day, Leo finds condoms in the car. Assuming the worst, he confronts Kate, so Theresa takes the blame, claiming she was having an affair. Leo and Kate decide to renew their vows.

Meanwhile, Leo's family is having a memorial service for him when a photo of him at the beach turns up. Realizing Magdalena lied, Mr. Montenegro goes to find Leo. When he reaches Kate's, Leo's memory returns upon seeing him and he realizes what happened. Hurt and angry, Leo returns to his yacht. The girls tearfully run after him and plead for him to stay, but are unsuccessful.

Kate decides to go after Leo, so she and the girls rush to the pizza place to borrow Bobby's boat to chase after the yacht. Meanwhile, Leo has become aware of how selfish and pretentious his life was before meeting Kate and the girls. He realizes he wants to be with them so has the captain turn the boat around.

Mr. Montenegro attempts to stop him, but Leo jumps into the water. Kate does the same as they swim to each other and share a kiss. Leo dismisses threats from his father, who in the process decides to name Sofia as his new successor as he is furious at both Leo (for choosing to be with Kate) and Magdalena (for lying about Leo).

Leo returns to a life with Kate and the girls. His former employee Colin arrives to offer his service as a nanny. After telling him they cannot afford him, he mentions that Sofia sent him to remind Leo that he still legally owns the yacht, worth $60 million. Kate and Leo marry aboard the yacht. Friends and family toast the newlyweds during the end credits. In the meantime, Magdalena tries to get herself back in good graces by claiming to have started an education initiative for children in the Philippines, though none of the children like her.

== Cast ==
- Eugenio Derbez as Leonardo Montenegro / Leo Sullivan
- Anna Faris as Kate Sullivan
- Eva Longoria as Theresa
- Mel Rodriguez as Bobby
- Hannah Nordberg as Emily Sullivan
- Alyvia Alyn Lind as Olivia Sullivan
- Payton Lepinski as Molly Sullivan
- Fernando Luján as Papi Montenegro
- Cecilia Suárez as Magdalena Montenegro
- Mariana Treviño as Sofia Montenegro
- John Hannah as Colin
- Swoosie Kurtz as Grace (Kate's mom)
- Josh Segarra as Jason
- Jesús Ochoa as Vito
- Omar Chaparro as Burro
- Adrian Uribe as Burrito
- Javier Lacroix as Carlos, the cook
- Édgar Vivar as Papi's Gastroenterologist
- Garry Chalk as Dr. Fletcher
- Darla Vandenbossche as Receptionist

== Production ==
In February 2017, Anna Faris guest-starred on the podcast Rupaul: What's the Tee with Michelle Visage. Rupaul Charles floated the idea of remaking a Goldie Hawn film in relation to Faris's resemblance. Faris responded, "I love Overboard" but seemed nervous at the idea of stepping into the shoes of a beloved role. Co-host Visage suggested bringing Chris Pratt, Faris's then-husband, to co-star. In March 2017, it was announced that Faris and Eugenio Derbez would star in a re-imagining of the original 1987 film, with Rob Greenberg directing. The main roles are gender-reversed from the original film. Derbez portrays a wealthy man who falls off of his yacht and is found by Faris's character, a single mother who convinces him that he is her husband. Filming began in Vancouver in May 2017. Eva Longoria joined the cast that month.

== Release ==
Overboard was released by Metro-Goldwyn-Mayer and Lionsgate Films (though the film is credited under its Pantelion Films division). It was originally scheduled for April 20, 2018, though in January 2018, the date was rescheduled for April 13, 2018. In March 2018, the film's release was rescheduled for May 4, 2018, to avoid competing against the new April 27 release of Avengers: Infinity War.

== Reception ==
=== Box office ===
Overboard grossed $50.3 million in the United States and Canada, and $40.9 million in other territories, for a worldwide total of $91.2 million, against a production budget of $12 million.

In the United States and Canada, Overboard was released alongside Tully and Bad Samaritan, and was projected to gross around $12 million from 1,623 theaters in its opening weekend. The film made $4.8 million on its first day, including $675,000 from Thursday night previews, an improvement from the $450,000 made by Derbez's How to Be a Latin Lover the year before. The film went on to debut at $14.8 million, finishing second, behind holdover Avengers: Infinity War; like Derbez's other films, Latinos made up at least a plurality of the audience (41%). Overboard fell 31% to $10.1 million in its second week, dropping to fourth, behind Avengers: Infinity War ($64.8 million), Life of the Party ($18.2 million) and Breaking In ($16.5 million).

=== Critical response ===
On Rotten Tomatoes, the film has an approval rating of 24% based on 87 reviews, and an average rating of 4.2/10. The website's critical consensus reads, "Overboard makes poor use of the ever-charming Anna Faris – and chooses questionable source material – to offer a remake that fails to clear the fairly low bar set by the original." On Metacritic, the film has a weighted average score of 42 out of 100, based on 27 critics, indicating "mixed or average reviews". Audiences polled by CinemaScore gave the film an average grade of "A−" on an A+ to F scale, while PostTrak reported filmgoers gave it an 83% overall positive score.

Variety's Owen Gleiberman wrote, "Overboard has been made with enough bubbly comic spirit and skill that the gender switch turns out to be a smart move, from both an entertainment and commercial vantage." Conversely, Johnny Oleksinski of the New York Post wrote "Hollywood isn't just churning out crummy remakes of great films anymore — now it's doing awful remakes of mediocre films. For evidence, see Overboard. Or, rather, don't."

=== Accolades ===
Award	Date	Category	Nominee(s)	Result	Ref.
Teen Choice Awards	August 12, 2018	Choice Comedy Movie	Overboard	Nominated	
Teen Choice Awards	August 12, 2018	Choice Comedy Movie Actor	Eugenio Derbez	Nominated	
Teen Choice Awards	August 12, 2018	Choice Comedy Movie Actress	Anna Faris	Nominated	
