= Mentada de padre =

- Directed by: Mark Alazraki; Fernando Rovzar
- Written by: Gary Alazraki; Mark Alazraki
- Starring: Héctor Suárez; Osvaldo Benavides; Antonio Gaona; Mauricio Isaac; Mauricio Barrientos
- Cinematography: Isi Sarfati
- Edited by: Jorge Macaya
- Production companies: Alazraki Entertainment; Traziende Films; Lemon Studios
- Release date: 16 August 2019 (Mexico)
- Country: Mexico
- Language: Spanish

Mentada de padre is a 2019 Mexican comedy film directed by Mark Alazraki and Fernando Rovzar, based from a screenplay by William Sutcliffe. The film is set in Mexico in 1942. And it revolves around the four children of Don Lauro Márquez Castillo (Héctor Suárez), a man who on his deathbed, asks his children to show who deserves to bear the last name Márquez Castillo. It premiered in Mexico on 16 August 2019.

== Cast ==
- Héctor Suárez as Don Lauro Márquez Castillo
- Osvaldo Benavides as Fausto Márquez Castillo
- Antonio Gaona as Abel Márquez Castillo
- Mauricio Isaac as Tadeo Márquez Castillo
- Mauricio Barrientos as Iker Márquez Castillo
- Sofía Sisniega as Lily
- Ximena Romo as Rosa
- Gerardo Taracena as Lider Rebeldes
- Roger Cudney as Williams
