= Shrek 2 =

2004 DreamWorks Animation film

- Theatrical release poster
- Directed by: Andrew Adamson; Kelly Asbury; Conrad Vernon
- Screenplay by: Andrew Adamson; Joe Stillman; J. David Stem; David N. Weiss
- Story by: Andrew Adamson
- Based on: Shrek! by William Steig
- Produced by: Aron Warner; David Lipman; John H. Williams
- Starring: Mike Myers; Eddie Murphy; Cameron Diaz; Julie Andrews; Antonio Banderas; John Cleese; Rupert Everett; Jennifer Saunders
- Edited by: Michael Andrews; Sim Evan-Jones
- Music by: Harry Gregson-Williams
- Production companies: DreamWorks Animation; PDI/DreamWorks
- Distributed by: DreamWorks Pictures (Note: In July 2014, the film's distribution rights were purchased by DreamWorks Animation from Paramount Pictures (owners of the pre-2005 DreamWorks Pictures catalog) and transferred to 20th Century Fox before reverting to Universal Pictures in 2018 following NBCUniversal's acquisition of DreamWorks Animation in 2016.)
- Release dates: May 15, 2004 (Cannes); May 19, 2004 (United States)
- Running time: 92 minutes
- Country: United States
- Language: English
- Budget: $150 million
- Box office: $933.8 million

Shrek 2 is a 2004 American animated fantasy comedy film directed by Andrew Adamson, Kelly Asbury, and Conrad Vernon from a screenplay by Adamson, Joe Stillman, and the writing team of J. David Stem and David N. Weiss. Loosely based on the 1990 children's picture book Shrek! by William Steig, it is a direct sequel to Shrek (2001) and the second installment in the Shrek film series. The film stars Mike Myers, Eddie Murphy, and Cameron Diaz, who reprise their respective voice roles of Shrek, Donkey, and Princess Fiona. They are joined by new characters voiced by Antonio Banderas, Julie Andrews, John Cleese, Rupert Everett, and Jennifer Saunders. Shrek 2 takes place following the events of the first film, with Shrek and Donkey meeting Fiona's parents while the zealous Fairy Godmother, who wants Fiona to marry her son Prince Charming, plots to destroy Shrek and Fiona's marriage. Shrek and Donkey team up with a sword-wielding cat named Puss in Boots to foil her plans.

Development began in 2001, and following disagreements with producers, the first film's screenwriters Ted Elliott and Terry Rossio were replaced with Adamson. The story was inspired by Guess Who's Coming to Dinner (1967), and new animation tools were utilized to improve the visual appearance of each character, particularly Puss. The lead actors also received a significant bump in salary to $10 million, which at the time was among the highest contracts in their respective careers. Like its predecessor, Shrek 2 also parodies other films based on fairy tales and features references to American popular culture. The film is dedicated to the memory of Shrek creator William Steig, who died on October 3, 2003, seven months before the film was released.

Shrek 2 premiered at the 2004 Cannes Film Festival on May 15, 2004, where it competed for the Palme d'Or, and was released in theaters on May 19, by DreamWorks Pictures. Like its predecessor, it received positive reviews from critics and is considered by many to be one of the best sequel films ever made. The film grossed $933.8 million worldwide, and scored the second-largest three-day opening weekend in United States history and the largest opening for an animated film at the time of its release. It went on to become the highest-grossing film of 2004 and the fifth-highest-grossing film overall at the time of its release. Shrek 2 is also DreamWorks Animation's highest-grossing film to date and the highest-grossing film released by DreamWorks Pictures, and it held the title of being the highest-grossing animated film of all time worldwide until Pixar Animation Studios' Toy Story 3 surpassed it in 2010. The film received two Academy Award nominations for Best Animated Feature and Best Original Song, and its associated soundtrack charted in the Top 10 on the US Billboard 200. Two sequels—Shrek the Third (2007) and Shrek Forever After (2010)—had soon followed, with an upcoming sequel, Shrek 5, scheduled to be released on June 30, 2027. The film's character Puss in Boots has also received his own series of spin-off media—a feature film Puss in Boots (2011), a streaming series The Adventures of Puss in Boots (2015–2018), and a sequel film Puss in Boots: The Last Wish (2022)—following his debut.

== Plot ==
Newlyweds Shrek and Princess Fiona return from their honeymoon to find they have been invited by Fiona's parents to a royal ball to celebrate their marriage. (Note: As depicted in Shrek (2001)) Though Shrek is mortified about visiting the kingdom as an ogre, and resents Fiona's parents for locking her in the tower, Fiona convinces him to attend, and they travel to the kingdom of Far Far Away with Donkey in tow and the fairy tale creatures house sitting. They meet Fiona's parents, King Harold and Queen Lillian, who are repulsed to see they are ogres. At dinner, Shrek and Harold get into a heated argument, and afterwards, Fiona encounters Fairy Godmother, a celebrity potions saleswoman who offers to help Fiona but is mortified to see she is married to Shrek. Shrek worries he is losing Fiona, especially after finding her childhood diary and reading that she was once seemingly infatuated with Prince Charming.

Harold is secretly reprimanded by Fairy Godmother, who had arranged with Harold for her son—Charming—to be the one to rescue and marry Fiona; she hopes to use the marriage to rule Far Far Away through Charming. She orders Harold to get rid of Shrek or else lose his own happy ending, so Harold hires swashbuckling outlaw and mercenary Puss in Boots to assassinate Shrek.

Unable to overpower Shrek, Puss reveals that he was paid by Harold and offers to help him in gratitude for having his own life spared. Shrek, Donkey, and Puss meet with Fairy Godmother at her potions factory to find something to help Shrek appeal to Fiona, but she coldly rejects his request, insisting ogres do not deserve happy endings. They retaliate by stealing a potion labeled "Happily Ever After" and accidentally trashing the factory. Shrek and Donkey drink the potion and soon fall asleep. Back in Far Far Away, Fiona notices Shrek is missing and tries to find him, but she too falls asleep.

The next morning, Shrek and Fiona awaken to find they are now human, and Donkey is a white stallion. To make the change permanent, Shrek must kiss Fiona by midnight. Shrek, Donkey, and Puss return to the castle; however, Fairy Godmother, having discovered the theft, has sent Charming to pose as human Shrek and win Fiona's love. At Fairy Godmother's urging, Shrek leaves the castle, believing that the best way to make Fiona happy is to let her go.

Fiona is skeptical of Charming; therefore, to ensure the two will wed, Fairy Godmother gives Harold a love potion to put into Fiona's tea. This exchange is overheard by Shrek, Donkey, and Puss, who are arrested by the royal knights after Donkey inadvertently exposes them. While the ball begins, the fairy tale creatures - having seen the arrest on the news - rescue the trio from the dungeon. They all storm the castle with the help of Mongo, a monstrous living gingerbread man created by the Muffin Man.

Though Mongo is destroyed, the group manages to break into the ball. Shrek fails to prevent Charming from kissing Fiona, but instead of falling in love, Fiona knocks him out. Harold reveals that he swapped Fiona's tainted teacup with his own, refusing to go through with the plot. Livid, the Fairy Godmother tries to strike Shrek with a spell from her magic wand. Harold jumps in front of it and is struck; the rest of the spell reflects off his breastplate and hits the Fairy Godmother, causing her to disintegrate into bubbles.

Harold reverts to his true form as the Frog Prince, having used the "Happily Ever After" potion years earlier to gain Lillian's love. He approves of Shrek and Fiona's marriage, while Lillian assures Harold that she still loves him. As the clock strikes midnight, Fiona declines Shrek's offer to remain human, and they revert to ogres, while Donkey also returns to normal, much to his sadness. Everyone celebrates as the ball continues. In a mid-credits scene, Dragon, who had recently married Donkey, arrives with several dragon-donkey hybrid babies.

== Voice cast ==
- Mike Myers as Shrek
- Eddie Murphy as Donkey
- Cameron Diaz as Princess Fiona
- Julie Andrews as Queen Lillian
- Antonio Banderas as Puss in Boots
- John Cleese as King Harold
- Rupert Everett as Prince Charming
- Jennifer Saunders as Fairy Godmother
- Larry King as Doris the Ugly Stepsister
  - Jonathan Ross provides the voice for the British version
- Aron Warner as Big Bad Wolf
- Cody Cameron as:
  - Pinocchio
  - The Three Little Pigs
- Christopher Knights and Simon J. Smith as Three Blind Mice
- Conrad Vernon as:
  - Gingy
  - Muffin Man
  - Mongo
  - Cedric
  - Announcer
- Chris Miller as Magic Mirror
- Mark Moseley as Dresser
- Kelly Cooney Cilella as Fast Food Clerk
- Kelly Asbury as:
  - Page
  - Elf
  - Nobleman
  - Nobleman's son
- Andrew Adamson as Captain of the Guard

Cameos

- Joan Rivers' cameo as herself marked the first time that a real person had been represented on screen by the Shrek animation team. Her part (though retaining her visual representation) was re-dubbed by presenter Kate Thornton for the United Kingdom release.
- Simon Cowell appears as himself on Far Far Away Idol, a parody of American Idol, on the DVD special features and just before the credits on the American VHS edition (see Home Media).

== Production ==
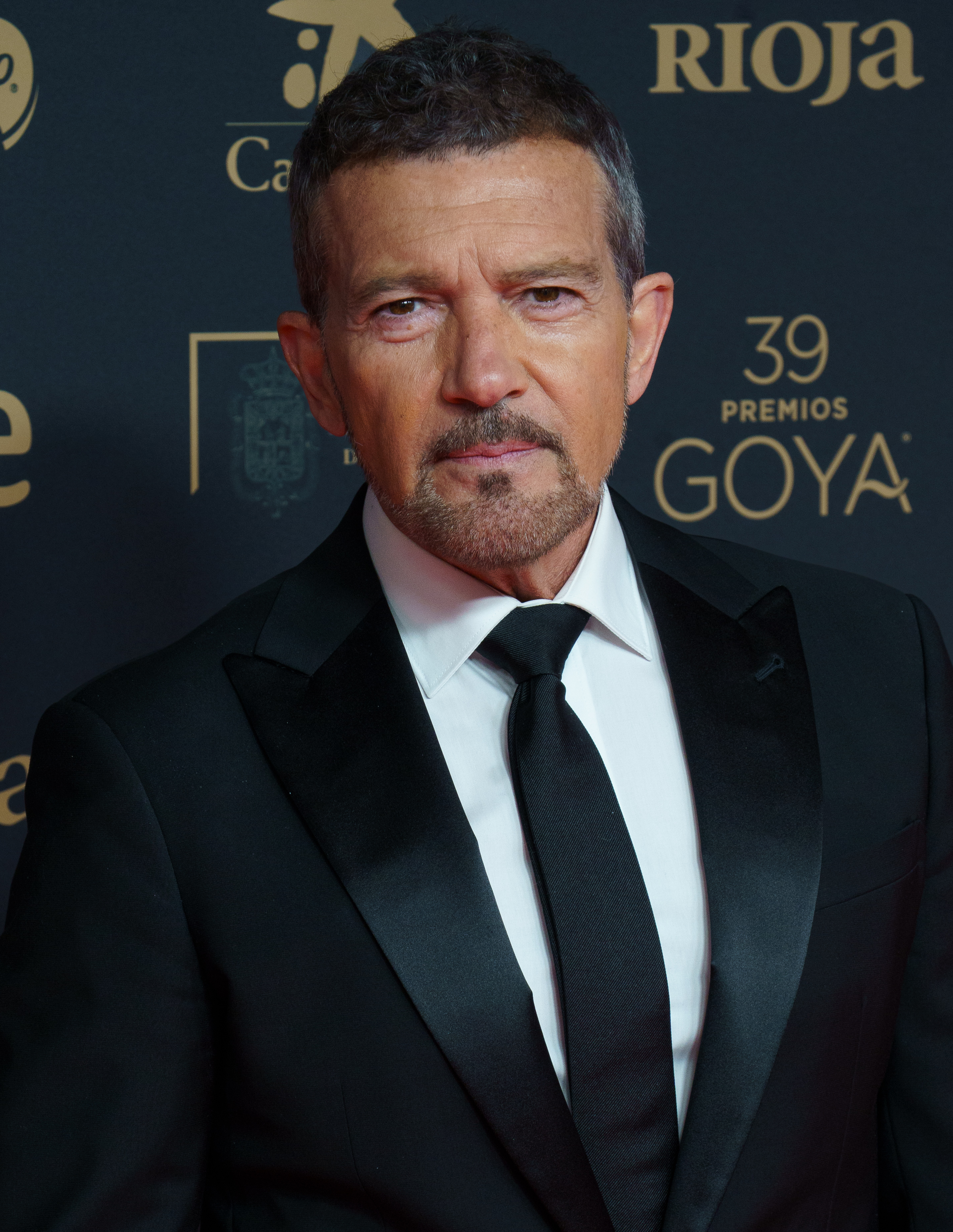
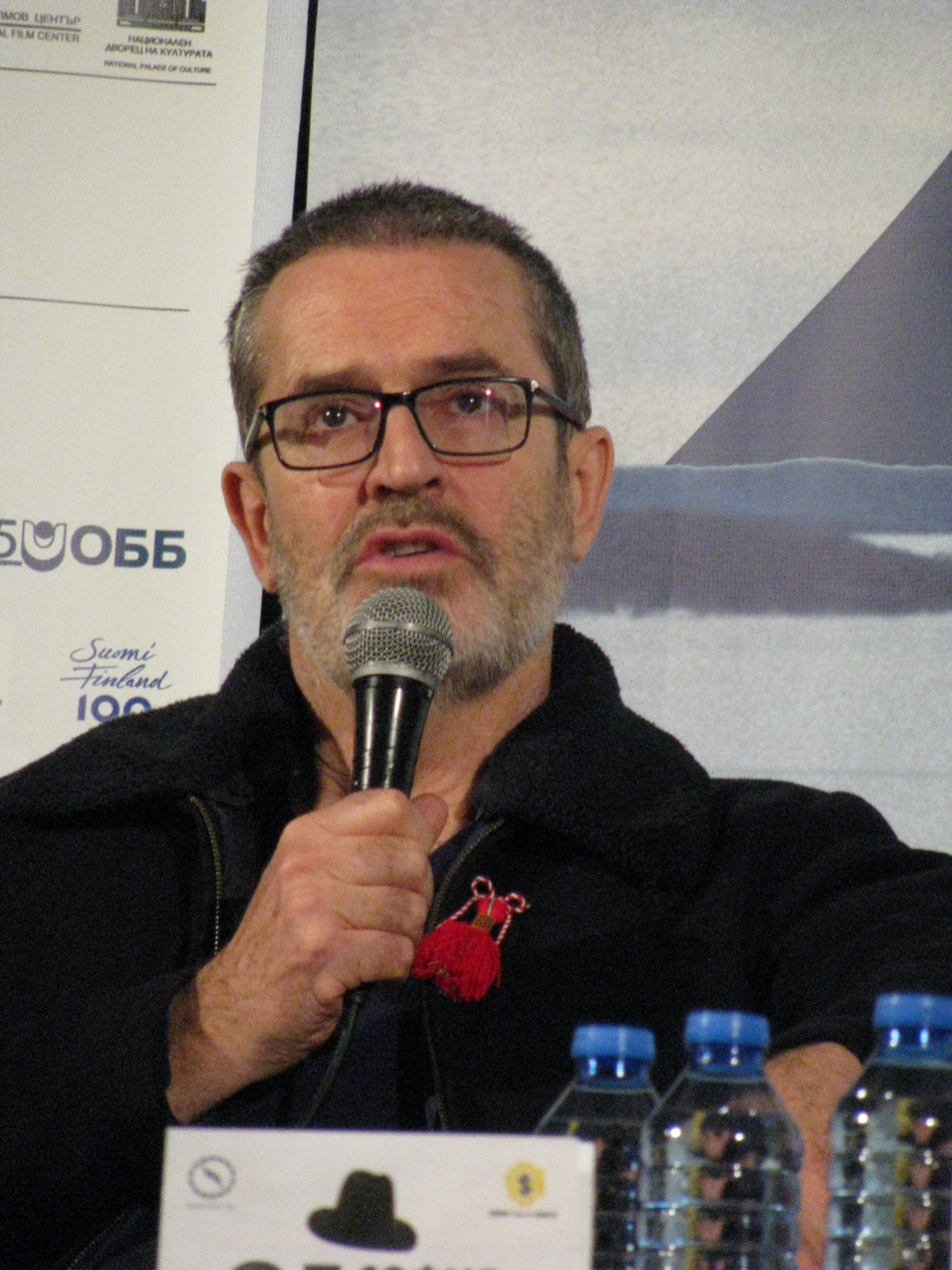
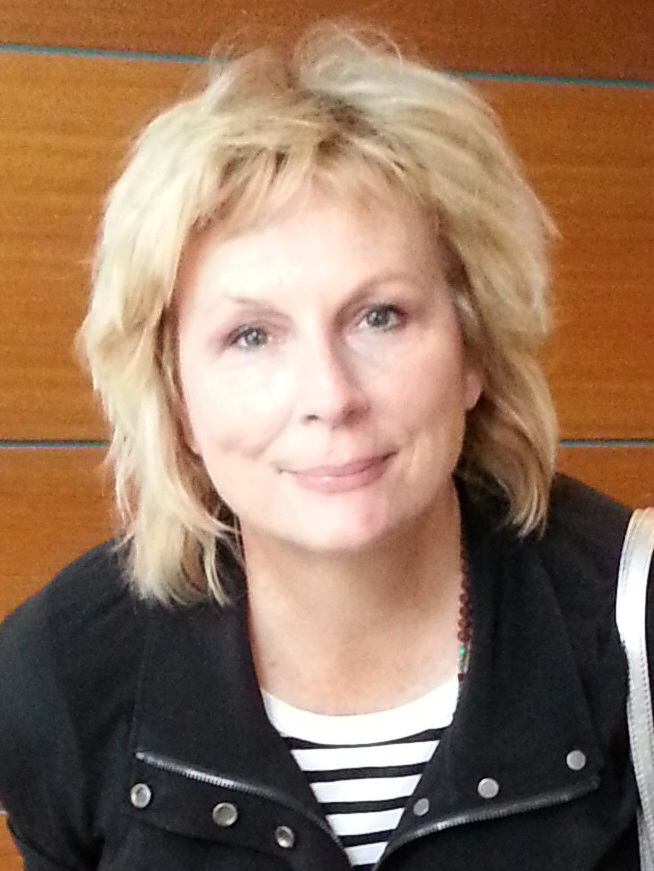
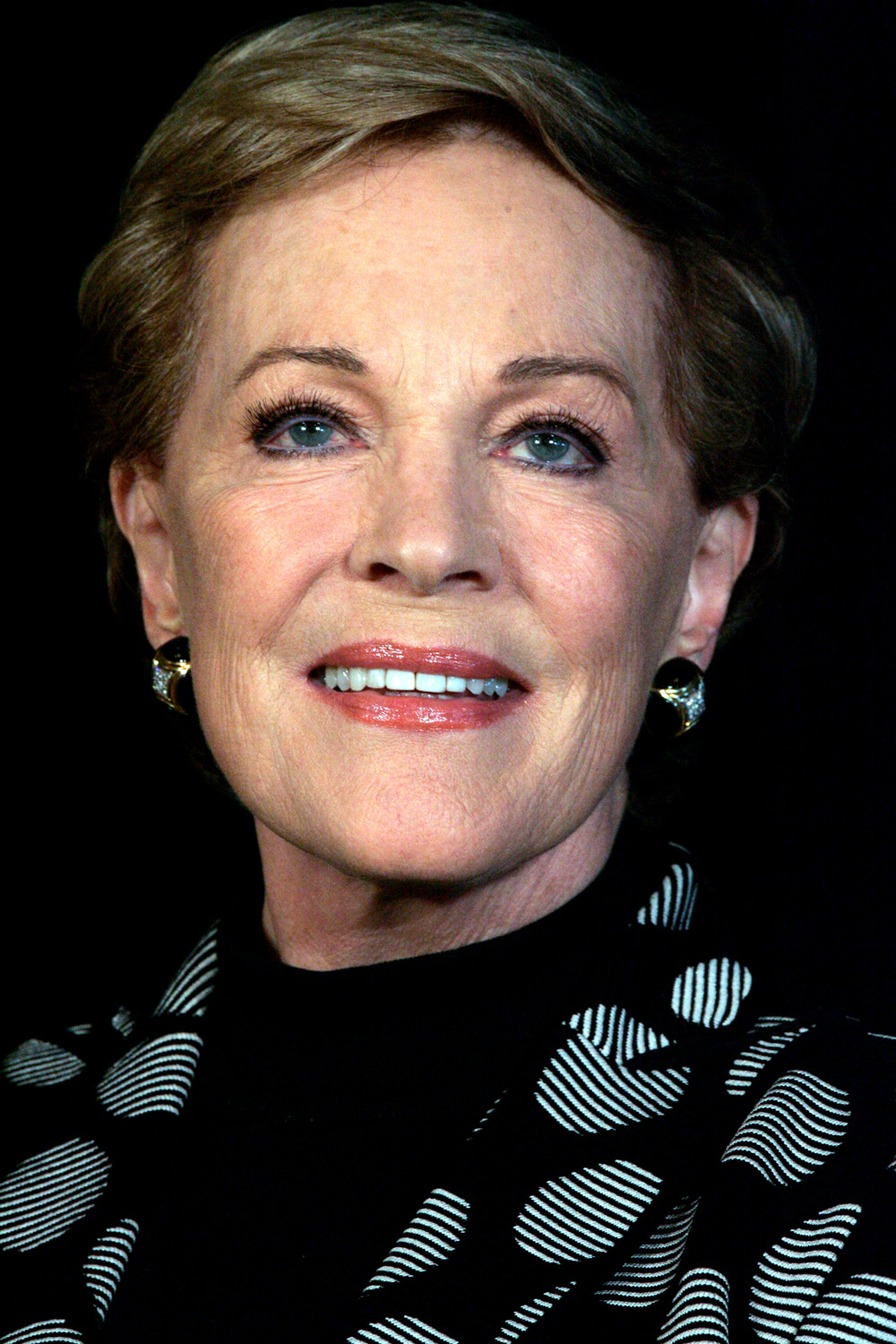
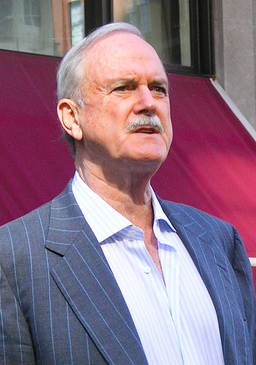
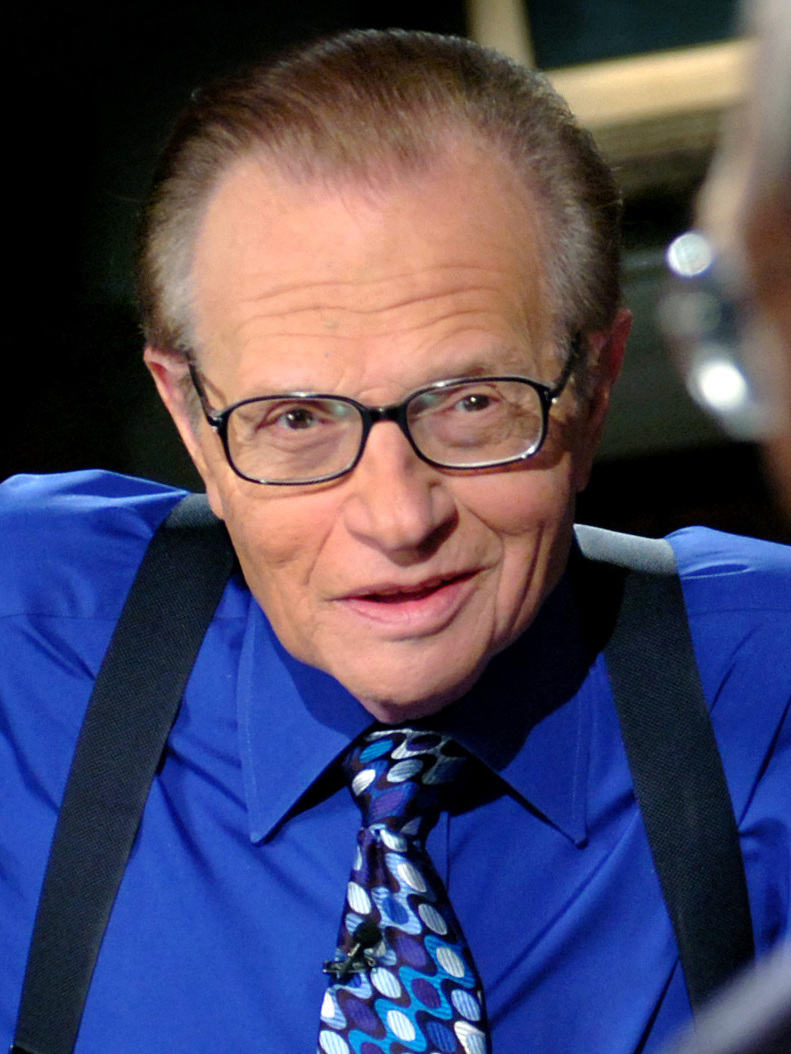
Top: Antonio Banderas, Rupert Everett, and Jennifer Saunders provide the voices for Puss in Boots, Prince Charming and the Fairy Godmother. Bottom: Julie Andrews, John Cleese, and Larry King voices Queen Lillian, King Harold and Doris the Ugly Stepsister.

In 2001, soon after the original Shrek proved to be a hit, Mike Myers, Eddie Murphy, and Cameron Diaz negotiated an upfront payment of $10 million each for voicing a sequel to the film. This pay increase represented a significant rise from the $350,000 salary that each of the three were paid for the first film. According to Jeffrey Katzenberg, the executive producer of Shrek 2 and a co-founder of DreamWorks Pictures, who led the negotiations, the payments were probably the highest in the actors' entire careers. Each of the actors were expected to work between 15 and 18 hours in total. The film was produced with a $70 million budget.

Director Andrew Adamson returned to direct Shrek 2, after previously directing the first Shrek film. Ted Elliott and Terry Rossio, the screenwriters and co-producers of the first film, insisted that the sequel would be a traditional fairytale, but after disagreements with the producers, they left the project and were replaced by Adamson. His writing for Shrek 2 was inspired by the 1967 comedy-drama film Guess Who's Coming to Dinner, and was completed with the help of the film's co-writers Joe Stillman (one of the other writers from the first film), and screenwriting duo J. David Stem and David N. Weiss, and co-directors, Kelly Asbury and Conrad Vernon, the latter two of whom spent most of the film's production duration in Northern California while Adamson spent most of his time with the film's voice actors in Glendale, California.

DreamWorks began production of Shrek 2 in 2001, before the first Shrek film was completed. The studio added more human characters to the film than there were in its predecessor and improved character appearance and movement with the use of several new animation/rendering systems. In particular, Puss in Boots necessitated development of a whole new set of film production tools to handle the appearance of his fur, belt, and hat plume; Puss' fur especially required an upgrade to the fur shader. All of the character setup was completed in the first three years of production.

In an early version of Shrek 2, Shrek abdicated the throne, and called for a fairy tale election. Pinocchio's campaign was an "honesty" campaign, while Gingy's was a "smear" campaign. Adamson said that although this plot did have many funny ideas, it was also too overtly satiric and political, and considered "more intellectual than emotional". Shrek 2 also appears much darker in terms of lighting when compared to the original film. Designers reportedly took inspiration from 19th century French illustrator and engraver Gustav Doré to improve the film's richness of detail and setting. According to production designer Guillaume Aretos, "There are a lot of medieval paintings and illustrations [and] my own influences, which are classical paintings from the 15th and 16th centuries...The design of Shrek is always a twist on reality anyway, so we tried to [pack] as much detail and interest as we could in the imagery."

=== Casting ===
Antonio Banderas signed on to the film as the voice of Puss in Boots. Banderas said that his initial motivation to voice Puss was that he enjoyed the first Shrek film. According to the actor, he was chosen for the role of Puss because of his Spanish accent. According to Banderas, he was on Broadway for the musical Nine when Katzenberg approached him about taking the role. The Shrek 2 filmmakers showed him "a lot of paintings of the character", and he realized how "little" Puss was. Banderas said that he had developed a strategy for playing Puss after accepting the role, which had determined Puss's personality.

== Soundtrack ==
The soundtrack for Shrek 2 was composed solely by Harry Gregson-Williams, who returned after composing the score for the first Shrek film, marking it as his fifth film with DreamWorks Animation. The soundtrack reached the 8th position on the US Billboard 200 and 1st on the US Soundtracks (Billboard). It also features two versions of the 1980s Bonnie Tyler hit "Holding Out for a Hero".

== Release ==
In April 2004, the film was selected to compete for the Palme d'Or at the 2004 Cannes Film Festival.

Shrek 2 was originally scheduled for release on June 18, 2004. The film was then moved forward from June 18, 2004, to May 21, 2004; however, due to "fan demand", it was moved up two days from May 21, 2004, to May 19, 2004. A day before the film went to theaters, the first five minutes were shown on Nickelodeon's U-Pick Live.

Playing in 4,163 theaters over its first weekend in the United States, Shrek 2 was the first film with over 4,000 theaters in overall count, surpassing X2 for having the widest release of any film. The film would hold the record for having the biggest number of theaters for three years until 2007 when Spider-Man 3 took it. Over 3,700 theaters was its count for an opening day.

The film was theatrically re-released in the United States for one week beginning on April 12, 2024, in celebration of its twentieth anniversary.

=== Home media ===
Shrek 2 was released on VHS and DVD on November 5, 2004, releasing on the same day as Pixar's The Incredibles, and on Game Boy Advance Video on November 17, 2005. It became one of the best-selling DVD releases of all time with over 37 million copies being sold grossing $458 million. However, 5 million more copies were printed than sold, causing DreamWorks to miss their forecasted first quarter earnings that year by 25%.

In February 2006, Paramount Pictures acquired the rights to all live-action films DreamWorks had released between 1997 and 2005, following Viacom's $1.6 billion acquisition of the company's live-action film assets and television assets. Additionally, Paramount signed a six-year distribution agreement for past and future DreamWorks Animation films, with DreamWorks Animation having spun off into a separate company from the live-action division in 2004. On August 16, 2010, Paramount Home Entertainment released a 10 film box set titled the "DreamWorks Animation Ultimate Box Set", which included Shrek, Shrek 2, Shrek the Third and 7 other DreamWorks Animation films. A 3D-converted version of the film was released exclusively with select Samsung television sets on Blu-ray on December 1, 2010, along with the other three films of the series. A non-3D version was released on December 7, 2010, as part of the Shrek: The Whole Story box set, and a stand-alone Blu-ray/DVD combo pack was released individually on August 30, 2011, along with the other two films of the series. A stand-alone 3D Blu-ray version of the film was released on November 1, 2011. The DVD release features two full-length commentary tracks, one by co-directors Conrad Vernon and Kelly Asbury, and he other by producer Aron Warner and editor Michael Andrews.

On December 31, 2012, DreamWorks Animation's distribution agreement with Paramount officially ended, and in July 2014, DreamWorks Animation announced they had reacquired the distribution rights to all of their films from Paramount, transferring these rights to their new distribution partner 20th Century Fox. On April 28, 2016, DreamWorks Animation was purchased by Comcast subsidiary NBCUniversal for $3.8 billion. Shrek 2 was released on Ultra HD Blu-ray on November 22, 2022, by Universal Pictures Home Entertainment.

==== Far Far Away Idol ====
Far Far Away Idol is a special feature on the DVD and VHS release based on American Idol and guest starring Simon Cowell. Taking place right after Shrek 2 ends, the short features characters from Shrek compete in a sing-off while being judged by Shrek, Fiona, and Cowell.

After the performances, on the DVD release, the viewer gets to pick the winner. If any character besides Shrek, Fiona, Donkey, or Puss is selected, an alternate ending plays where Cowell would refuse to accept the winner and proclaim himself the victor, leaping onto the judging table and performing his "own" rendition of "My Way". At the end of the VHS release, it gives a link to a website where the viewer can vote for their favorite to determine the ultimate winner. DreamWorks Animation announced on November 8, 2004, three days after the DVD and VHS release, that with 750,000 votes cast, the "winner" of the competition was Doris.

== Reception ==
=== Box office ===
The film opened at No. 1 with a Friday-to-Sunday total of $108 million, and $129 million since its Wednesday launch, from a then-record 4,163 theaters, for an average of $25,952 per theater over the weekend. At the time Shrek 2's Friday-to-Sunday total was the second-highest opening weekend, only trailing Spider-Man's $114.8 million. In addition, Saturday alone managed to obtain $44.8 million, making it the highest single-day gross at the time, beating Spider-Man's first Saturday gross of $43.6 million. The film remained at No. 1 in its second weekend, expanding to 4,223 theaters, and grossing another $95.6 million over the four-day Memorial Day weekend, narrowly beating out the $85.8 million four-day tally of new opener The Day After Tomorrow. It spent ten weeks in the weekly Top 10, remaining there until July 29, and stayed in theaters for 149 days (roughly twenty-one weeks), closing on November 25, 2004. The film was released in the United Kingdom on July 2, 2004, and topped the country's box office for the next two weekends, before being dethroned by Spider-Man 2.

The film grossed $439.8 million domestically (US and Canada) and $494 million in foreign markets for a total of $933.8 million worldwide, making it the highest-grossing film of both 2004 and in its franchise. This also puts the film at 14th on the all-time domestic box office list and 42nd on the worldwide box office list. The film sold an estimated 71,050,900 tickets in the US.

The film also took away the highest worldwide gross made by an animated feature, which was before held by Finding Nemo (2003), although the latter still had a higher overseas-only gross. With DVD sales and Shrek 2 merchandise estimated to total almost $800 million, the film (which was produced with a budget of $150 million) is DreamWorks' most profitable film to date.

Shrek 2 remained the highest-grossing animated film worldwide until the release of Toy Story 3 (2010), and held the record for the highest-grossing animated film at the North American box office until the release of Finding Dory (2016) as well as the highest-grossing non-Disney animated film at this box office until the release of The Super Mario Bros. Movie in 2023. It also remained the highest-grossing non-Disney animated film worldwide until it was surpassed by Despicable Me 2 in 2013. It also remained the highest-grossing non Disney or Universal animated film worldwide until it was surpassed by Ne Zha 2 in 2025 after 21 years, a Chinese film. It however remains to this day the highest-grossing non Disney or Universal animated film made in United States.

=== Critical response ===
Shrek 2 received positive reviews from critics. The film has an approval rating of 89% based on 234 professional reviews on the review aggregator website Rotten Tomatoes, with an average rating of 7.9/10. Its critical consensus reads, "It may not be as fresh as the original, but topical humor and colorful secondary characters make Shrek 2 a winner in its own right." Metacritic (which uses a weighted average) assigned Shrek 2 a score of 75 out of 100 based on 40 critics, indicating "generally favorable reviews". Audiences polled by CinemaScore gave the film an average grade of "A" on an A+ to F scale.

Roger Ebert gave the film three out of four stars, saying it is "bright, lively, and entertaining", and Robert Denerstein of Denver Rocky Mountain News called it "sharply funny". James Kendrick of QNetwork praised the plot, calling it "familiar, but funny". J. R. Jones of the Chicago Reader called it "unassailable family entertainment", and similar to the first film. Michael O'Sullivan of The Washington Post called it "better and funnier than the original".

Though he wrote that it is not as good as the first film, Kevin Lally of Film Journal International described it as "inventive and often very funny". Peter Rainer of New York magazine, however, stated the film "manages to undo much of what made its predecessor such a computer-generated joy ride."

Sean Naughton of Complex described it as "one of the best-animated sequels ever".

=== Accolades ===
Shrek 2 was nominated for the Palme d'Or at the 2004 Cannes Film Festival. It won five awards at the 31st People's Choice Awards: Favorite Animated Movie, Favorite Animated Movie Star for "Donkey" (Eddie Murphy), Favorite Movie Comedy, and Favorite Movie Villain for "Fairy Godmother" (Jennifer Saunders), and Favorite Sequel. It also won a Teen Choice Award in the category of Choice Award Choice Movie – Comedy. The film was nominated at the 3rd Visual Effects Society Awards in the category of "Outstanding Performance by an Animated Character in an Animated Motion Picture."

Along with Shark Tale, the film was nominated for the Academy Award for Best Animated Feature, but lost to The Incredibles. One of the film's songs, "Accidentally in Love" received nominations for the Academy Award for Best Original Song, Golden Globe Award for Best Original Song, and the Grammy Award for Best Song Written for a Motion Picture, Television or Other Visual Media.

In 2008, the American Film Institute nominated the film for its Top 10 Animation Films list.

Awards
Award	Category	Name	Outcome
Academy Awards	Best Animated Feature	Andrew Adamson	Nominated
Academy Awards	Best Original Song	"Accidentally in Love"	Nominated
Annie Awards	Best Animated Feature	Andrew Adamson	Nominated
Annie Awards	Music in an Animated Feature Production	Harry Gregson-Williams	Nominated
Annie Awards	Best Storyboarding in an Animated Feature Production	Conrad Vernon	Nominated
Annie Awards	Voice Acting in an Animated Feature Production	Antonio Banderas	Nominated
Annie Awards	Best Writing in an Animated Feature Production	Andrew Adamson, Joe Stillman, J. David Stem, and David N. Weiss	Nominated
Awards Circuit Community Awards	Best Animated Feature Film		Runner-up
BMI Film & TV Awards	BMI Film Music Award	Harry Gregson-Williams	Won
BMI Film & TV Awards	Most Performed Song from a Film	"Accidentally In Love"	Won
Broadcast Film Critics Association Award	Best Animated Feature		Nominated
Broadcast Film Critics Association Award	Best Song	"Accidentally In Love"	Nominated
Cannes Film Festival	Palme d'Or	Andrew Adamson, Kelly Asbury & Conrad Vernon	Nominated
Dallas–Fort Worth Film Critics Association	Best Animated Film		Nominated
Gold Derby Awards	Best Animated Feature		Nominated
Gold Derby Awards	Best Original Song	Counting Crows	Nominated
Golden Schmoes Awards	Most Overrated Movie of the Year		Nominated
Golden Schmoes Awards	Best Animated Movie of the Year		Nominated
Golden Schmoes Awards	Coolest Character of the Year (for "Puss in Boots")		Nominated
Golden Trailer Awards	Best Animation/Family (for "Ant Farm, The")		Nominated
Grammy Awards	Best Compilation Soundtrack Album	Andrew Adamson, Christopher Douridas & Michael Ostin	Nominated
Grammy Awards	Best Song	David Bryson, Adam Duritz, David Immerglück, Matthew Malley & Dan Vickrey for "Accidentally In Love"	Nominated
Hollywood Film Awards	Animation of the Year	Andrew Adamson, Kelly Asbury & Conrad Vernon	Won
International Film Music Critics Association	Best Original Score for a Comedy Film	Harry Gregson-Williams	Nominated
International Online Cinema Awards	Best Animated Feature	Andrew Adamson, Kelly Asbury & Conrad Vernon	Nominated
International Online Cinema Awards	Best Original Song	"Accidentally In Love"	Nominated
Irish Film & Television Academy	Best International Actress	Cameron Diaz	Nominated
Italian National Syndicate of Film Journalists	Best Foreign Director	Andrew Adamson, Kelly Asbury & Conrad Vernon	Nominated
Italian Online Movie Awards	Best Animated Feature Film		Won
Italian Online Movie Awards	Best Original Song	"Accidentally in Love"	Nominated
Motion Picture Sound Editors	Best Sound Editing in Feature Film – Animated	Randy Thom, Dennis Leonard, Jonathan Null, Marilyn McCoppen, David C. Hughes, Scott Guitteau, J.R. Grubbs Ewa Sztompke, Larry Oatfield, Andre Fenley & Mark Jan Wlodarkiewicz	Nominated
MTV Movie & TV Awards	Best Comedic Performance	Antonio Banderas	Nominated
MTV Movie Awards, Mexico	Favorite Voice in an Animated Film	Eugenio Derbez as the voice of Donkey in Latin America	Won
Nickelodeon Kids' Choice Awards	Favorite Movie		Nominated
Nickelodeon Kids' Choice Awards	Favorite Animated Film		Nominated
Nickelodeon Kids' Choice Awards	Favorite Voice From An Animated Movie	Mike Myers	Nominated
Nickelodeon Kids' Choice Awards	Favorite Voice From An Animated Movie	Eddie Murphy	Nominated
Nickelodeon Kids' Choice Awards	Favorite Voice From An Animated Movie	Cameron Diaz	Nominated
Online Film & Television Association	Best Animated Picture	Aron Warner, David Lipman & John H. Williams	Nominated
Online Film & Television Association	Best Music, Original Song	Adam Duritz, Charles Gillingham, Jim Bogios, David Immerglück, Matthew Malley, David Bryson & Daniel Vickers (for "Accidentally in Love")	Nominated
Online Film Critics Society	Best Animated Film		Nominated
People's Choice Awards	Favorite Movie Comedy		Won
People's Choice Awards	Favorite Sequel		Won
People's Choice Awards	Favorite Animated Movie		Won
People's Choice Awards	Favorite Animated Movie Star	Eddie Murphy	Won
People's Choice Awards	Favorite Movie Villain	Jennifer Saunders	Won
People's Choice Awards	Favorite Motion Picture		Nominated
Phoenix Film Critics Society Awards	Best Original Song	"Accidentally in Love"	Won
Russian National Movie Awards	Best Blockbuster Movie		Won
Satellite Awards	Best Motion Picture, Animated or Mixed Media	Andrew Adamson, Kelly Asbury, and Conrad Vernon	Nominated
Teen Choice Awards	Choice Movie: Animated/Computer Generated		Won
Teen Choice Awards	Choice Movie – Comedy		Won
Teen Choice Awards	Choice Movie of the Summer		Nominated
Visual Effects Society	Outstanding Performance by an Animated Character in an Animated Motion Picture	Antonio Banderas; Raman Hui	Nominated
World Soundtrack Awards	Soundtrack Composer of the Year	Harry Gregson-Williams	Nominated
World Soundtrack Awards	Best Original Soundtrack of the Year	Harry Gregson-Williams	Nominated
World Soundtrack Awards	Best Original Song Written for Film	Counting Crows	Nominated
Young Artist Awards	Best Family Feature Film – Animation		Nominated

== Other media ==
=== Video games ===
- Shrek 2 (2004)
- Shrek 2 Activity Center: Twisted Fairy Tale Fun (2004)
- Shrek 2: Beg for Mercy (2004)
- Shrek SuperSlam (2005)
- Shrek Smash n' Crash Racing (2006)

=== Novels ===
Shrek 2: The Movie Storybook was published by Scholastic in 2004. It was written by Tom Mason and Dan Danko and illustrated by Michael Koelsch.

== Sequels and spin-offs ==
Shrek 2 was followed by two sequels; Shrek the Third was released on May 18, 2007, while Shrek Forever After was released on May 21, 2010. A fifth film, Shrek 5, is in development, releasing on June 30, 2027.

A spin-off film Puss in Boots was released on October 28, 2011, and focuses on the character of Puss in Boots, who was introduced in this film. On November 6, 2018, it was reported by Variety that Chris Meledandri had been tasked to reboot both Shrek and Puss in Boots, with the original cast potentially returning. Puss in Boots: The Last Wish was released on December 21, 2022; it is a sequel rather than a reboot.
