= Crazy Weekend =

Loco fin de semana
- Theatrical release poster
- Directed by: Kristoff Raczyñski
- Written by: Kristoff Raczyñski
- Produced by: Felipe Pérez Arroyo
- Cinematography: Rafael Sanchez
- Edited by: Antonio Mejía
- Production companies: MCM Studios; Alebrije Cine y Video
- Distributed by: Sky Media Distribution
- Release date: 14 June 2019 (Mexico)
- Running time: 94 minutes
- Country: Mexico
- Language: Spanish

Crazy Weekend (Spanish: Loco fin de semana) is a 2019 Mexican comedy film written and directed by Kristoff Raczyñski. The film premiered on 14 June 2019 in Mexico, and it stars Christian Vázquez.

== Cast ==
- Christian Vázquez as Fede "El Pervertido"
- Oswaldo Zárate as Memo "El Jarioso"
- Alejandra Toussaint as Alejandra
- Giovanna Romo as Pau "La Metiche"
- Juan Pablo Castañeda as Carlos "El Traumas"
- Reynaldo Rossano as Harry "El Exótico"
- Juan Pablo Gil as El Príncipe
- Mauricio Barrientos as El Diablito
- Ricardo Margaleff as El Doc
