= A Wizard's Tale =

Animated fantasy adventure comedy film

- Theatrical release poster
- Directed by: Andrés Couturier
- Written by: Jim Hecht
- Based on: Here Comes the Grump by DePatie–Freleng Enterprises
- Produced by: José C. García de Letona; Fernando De Fuentes; Greg Gavanski; Bill Schultz
- Starring: Toby Kebbell; Lily Collins; Ian McShane
- Edited by: J. Martín Téllez Andrade
- Music by: James Seymour Brett
- Production companies: Ánima Estudios; Prime Focus World; GFM Films; Grump Productions
- Distributed by: Corazón Films (Mexico); Signature Entertainment (United Kingdom); GFM Films (international sales)
- Release dates: 1 March 2018 (Italy); 11 May 2018 (United Kingdom); 26 July 2018 (Mexico)
- Running time: 97 minutes
- Countries: Mexico; United Kingdom; India
- Languages: English; Spanish
- Budget: $0.9 million
- Box office: MX$22.9 million (US$4.55 million)

A Wizard's Tale (also known as Ahí Viene Cascarrabias in Mexico and Here Comes the Grump internationally) is a 2018 animated fantasy adventure comedy film based on the DePatie–Freleng animated series, Here Comes the Grump, which originally ran from 1969 to 1970 on NBC.

Directed by Andrés Couturier and written by Jim Hecht, the film is an international co-production between Mexico, United Kingdom and India and is produced by Ánima Estudios, Prime Focus World, and GFM Animation, the film features the voices of Toby Kebbell, Lily Collins, and Ian McShane. The Spanish version stars the voices of Camila Sodi and Mauricio Barrientos "El Diablito".

It was first released in Italy on 1 March 2018. The film was later released on July 26 in Mexico and was a commercial failure.

The film was released by Blue Fox Entertainment in the United States in limited format and VOD on 14 September the same year, released as A Wizard's Tale.

== Plot ==
In an alternate dimension, there exists a kingdom called Groovingham, where a wizard called The Grin lives. The Grin casts a spell to make people happy, but the magic deprives the subjects of their morality, resulting in instant pandemonium. Outraged, the king orders his royals guards to arrest The Grin. Though the authorities corner him on a cliff, The Grin escapes with his fiancée, Mary, in his blimp.

The Grin goes into hiding and adopts a baby dragon he names Dingo. Mary promises to return to The Grin, but the authorities capture her, and the king has her banished to Earth in a forest near a 1970 London. Unaware that Mary was exiled, the Grin becomes an embittered pariah called the Grump.

On Earth, Mary owns an amusement park that resembles Groovingham and has a grandson named Terry Dexter. During Terry's childhood, his grandmother reads him her bestselling story called "Here Comes the Grump", which summarizes the events before her banishment. Years later, Mary passes away, and Terry who is now a young adult became the qorker of her amusement park.

One night Terry finds a hidden handle piece of his grandmother's blimp. After reattaching the handle to the blimp, it sends him to Groovingham, much to his astonishment. Meanwhile, the Grump, who was captured at some point for his purported crime, escapes from prison alongside his diminutive henchmen called the Grumpies and enacts vengeance upon the king. However, he instantly realizes the king had died after spotting a statue built as his memorial. While feeling cheated out of revenge, the Grin discovers a poster of Princess Dawn's coronation and takes action against her instead. Interrupting the coronation, the Grump casts his "gloom spell" upon everyone, putting them into a state of depression. Princess Dawn manages to escape the gloom by being hidden in a chamber beneath her bed by her servants while her pet, a pink dog-like creature who can turn his nose into a jumping ball named Bip, leaves Groovingham to seek help from an outsider.

As Terry tries to pilot the blimp back to his homeworld, the handle piece is taken by Bip, prompting Terry to chase him into Groovingham. Emerging from hiding, Dawn begs Terry to help save her kingdom. Terry reluctantly agrees so that he can return home. When his minions inform the Grump that Dawn had escaped the gloom, he returns to the castle where Terry recognizes him as the Grin from his grandmother's story. After being chased by the Grumpies through the castle's interior, Terry and Dawn reach the map room where they met a mechanical bird named G. P. Sparrow, who agrees to navigate them to the Oracle who knows how to lift the Grin's curse.

Princess Dawn and Terry learn from the Oracle that they need a magical key from the Cave of Whispering Orchards to restore happiness in Groovingham, which the Grump overhears. During the confrontation, the blimp becomes punctured, rendering it unable to be airborne. They seek repairs at the Balloony Kingdom, under siege by the Grump. As Terry and the balloon people fight back, Dawn causes Dingo to sneeze, sending the Grump mounted on him flying away.

With repairs finished on the blimp, the Grump lands on a nearby branch protruding from a cliff and casts the gloom spell on Dawn before plummeting. Seeking help from an alchemist to treat Dawn's condition, Terry learns that a kiss can break the curse afflicted upon her before sunset; otherwise, the spell will be permanent. However, after going through with it, Terry admits that he lacks feelings for Dawn since he has only known her for a day and that he wants to return home, upsetting the princess who dismisses him.

At the Cave of Whispering Orchards the Orchards expel Terry since they only allow wizards inside. The Grump arrives and cast a sleep spell on Terry before proceeding to get the key. Bip returns to Dawn, who returns to Terry and awakens him with a kiss. The Grump returns empty-handed and accuses Terry of taking the key. Terry denies the Grump's accusations, but a key falls off him. He and Dawn try to escape but lose consciousness after falling into a pit.

While incarcerated in Groovingham, Dawn asks Terry how he obtained the key. He hypothesizes that he is a wizard himself. After Bip frees them, Dawn and Terry confront the Grump on the castle's rooftop, using the key to eliminate happiness. Dawn manages to subdue the Grumpies while Terry subdues the Grump but also damages the key. Dawn implores Terry to leave on the blimp, but he decides to stay with her. Through their faith, they restore the key, which undoes the Grump's magic on Groovingham. The Grump retreats to his blimp and fights with Terry while heading to Earth. Upon visiting Mary's amusement park, the Grump becomes remorseful since he only wanted to make people happy. Terry convinces him that they still can and reveals himself to be his grandson.

Terry reopens Groovingland, where he introduces Dawn to his parents with his mother looking reminiscent of the Grump. He also employs the Grump and the other characters from Groovingham as attractions.

== Voice cast ==
- Toby Kebbell as Terry Dexter
- Lily Collins / Camila Sodi (Spanish) as Princess Dawn
- Ian McShane as The Grump
- Keith Wickham / Mauricio Barrientos (Spanish) as GP Sparrow
- David Holt as Bip
- Emma Tate as Grandma Mary/Nanny Bear
- Amy Thompson as Mary / Old Woman / Whispering Orchids
- Jay Britton as Grumpies / Caveman / Thelonious
- Andres Williams as Chancellor Woodblock
- Claire Morgan as Fashion Manager
- Paul Tylak as Oracle / Balloon Herald 2 / Red Bird
- Darren Altman as Robert
- Inel Tomlinson as Prime Pine / Air Doll / Generic Balloon 1
- Ed Gaughan as Omette / Christmas Tree 3 / Hobo
- John Hasler as Amusement Park Dad / Beefeater 3
- Rasmus Hardiker as Balloon Herald 1 / Prince Charming
- Matthew Bloxham as Christmas Tree 2 / Generic Balloon 3
- Fred Grey as Royal Guard 2 / Singing Map / Taxman / Additional Crowd
- Alexander Cobb as Terry's Dad / Yellow Wizard / Additional Crowd
- Alana Ramsey as Additional Crowd
- Sophie Alfred as Additional Crowd

== Development ==
The film was first announced in September 2014 when a film adaptation of the Here Comes the Grump cartoon, produced by Ánima Estudios, was in development. Development didn't start immediately after its announcement due to development of other projects. Despite being an American cartoon, the series was far more popular in Mexico than in the United States, which led to the film being produced.

Production of the film was completed in 2017.

=== Character designs ===
The film's characters were designed by Craig Kellman, who has also designed characters for other animated films, such as Hotel Transylvania and Madagascar.

=== Animation ===
The film's animation was created at Prime Focus World at its London and Mumbai facilities. that previously collaborated with Ánima. Greg Gavanski, head of Prime Focus Animation, said, "Animation is well underway and our artists are pushing the limits to put as much quality and humor into every last frame".

While Ánima itself was in charge of the film's creative development and supervision, with the direction done by Andrés Couturier, the manager at Ánima.

=== Casting ===
British actors Toby Kebbell, Lily Collins, and Ian McShane joined the film's lead English voice cast, while most of the English version was done in the United Kingdom, the rest of the casting done by Todd Resnick's The Voice Company studio in Los Angeles.

Prime Focus's Greg Gavanski commented that he was "thrilled" with the casting: "We are thrilled to welcome Ian, Lily and Toby to the Grump team. This hugely talented voice cast, alongside the beautiful animation delivered by the artists of Ánima [Estudios] and Prime Focus, has brought these fantastic characters to life in ways we couldn't have imagined. I couldn't have hoped for things to come together any better than this".

The casting has also been an important moment for Ánima Estudios, about which producer and company COO José C. García de Letona has shared his excitement: "Having such amazing actors be part of our movie makes us feel even more excited about it. We are sure that the audiences will love McShane's grouchy character, Lily's adorable princess and Toby's cool hero".

=== Music ===
James Seymour Brett composed the film's original score.

== Release ==
The film was released in the United Kingdom on 11 May 2018 by Signature Entertainment. The film was released in the United States in limited locations and digital platforms on 14 September 2018.

=== Reception ===
The film received generally negative reviews from critics. On Tomatazos, it has a score of "43%". Meanwhile, on Rotten Tomatoes, it has a "Rotten" score of "17%", based on 6 reviews.

=== Box office ===
In Mexico, the film performed weakly at the box-office, opening at No. 6 and grossing $8.99 million pesos (est. $0.48 million USD). In its second week, the film moved down to No. 8, grossing $4.26 million pesos (est. US$0.2 million) which brings a total of $18.44 million pesos (est. US$0.99 million). It has earned $22.9 million pesos in total.

In the United States, the film has grossed $1,626 in 10 theaters.

The film has grossed a total of $4.55 million worldwide.

== Awards and nominations ==
Year	Award	Category	Nominees	Result
2018	15th Premios Canacine	Mejor Película de Animación (Best Animated Film)	Ahí viene Cascarrabias	Nominated
2019	20th Golden Trailer Awards	Best Foreign Animation Family Trailer	Here Comes the Grump	Nominated
2019	61st Ariel Awards	Mejor largometraje animado (Best Feature Animation)	Andrés Couturier	Nominated

== See also ==
- Here Comes the Grump
- Ánima Estudios
- DePatie–Freleng Enterprises
