= Sr. Ávila =

- Sr. Ávila season three teaser poster
- Genre: Drama
- Created by: Marcelo Slavich; Walter Slavich
- Directed by: Fernando Rovzar; Alejandro Lozano; Alfonso Pineda Ulloa
- Creative directors: Sandra Bacmeister; Sofia Medal
- Starring: Tony Dalton
- Music by: Álvaro Arce Urroz; Andrés Franco
- Country of origin: Mexico
- Original language: Spanish
- No. of seasons: 4
- No. of episodes: 43

Production
- Executive producers: Alexis Fridman (2013–present); Luis Peraza (2013–present); Roberto Rios (2013–present); Billy Rovzar (2013–present); Fernando Rovzar (2013)
- Producer: Julián de Tavira
- Production location: Mexico City, Distrito Federal, Mexico
- Cinematography: Daniel Jacobs
- Camera setup: Multi-camera
- Production companies: Lemon Films; HBO Latin America Originals

Original release
- Network: HBO Latin America
- Release: 26 May 2013 – September 30, 2018

Sr. Ávila (English: Don Ávila) is a Mexican television series created by Marcelo Slavitch and Walter Slavitch, and aired by HBO Latinoamérica.

Roberto Ávila is a middle-class funeral parlor employee, doting husband and father. He is also a cunning hit man. When he decides to head an organization of contract killers, the thin veil between his ordinary and hidden lives wears quickly. In this seedy underworld of hired crime, every entanglement falls into the hands of Sr. Avila—who must decide who stays and who goes.

The series has executive production by Luis F. Peraza, Roberto Rios, Paul Drago and Gabriela Remirez of HBO Latin America Originals, and Fernando Rovzar, Billy Rovzar and Alexis Fridman of Lemon Films. Sr. Ávila is directed by Fernando Rovzar along with Alejandro Lozano, and the script was written by Walter and Marcelo Slavich, who also were the authors of Epitafios, another original production HBO Latin America.

== Cast ==
- Tony Dalton as Roberto Ávila
- Carlos Aragón as Iván Alcázar
- Camila Selser as Ana Solares
- Juan Carlos Remolina as Detective Sánchez
- Nailea Norvind as María Ávila (seasons 1–2)
- Adrián Alonso as Emiliano Ávila (seasons 1–2)
- Ilse Salas as Erika Duarte (seasons 2–4)
- Jorge Caballero as Ismael Rueda (seasons 1–2)
- Hernán Mendoza as Ybarra
- Fernando Ciangherotti as Nicolás Duarte (season 3)
- Ari Brickman as El Croata (seasons 1–3)
- Rebecca Jones as Dra. Mola (season 2)
- Mauricio Isaac as Blas (season 2)
- Margarita Muñoz as Magda "Maggie" Muñoz (seasons 1–2)
- Daniel Martínez as Díaz (seasons 2–3)
- Iliana Fox as Tamara (seasons 1–2)
- Martijn Kuiper as Cardoso (season 3)
- Adal Ramones as Ciego (seasons 1–2)
- Sofía Sisniega as Luna (seasons 1–2)
- Jean Paul Leroux as Jesús "Chucho" Galván (season 3)
- Paulina Gaitán as Juliana Rivas (season 1)
- Alex Sirvent as El Chulo (seasons 1)
- Michel Brown as Daniel Molina (season 3)
- Fernando Gaviria as Bermúdez (seasons 1)
- Javier Díaz Dueñas as Patrón (seasons 1)
- Marcela Guirado as Natalia (seasons 3)
- Veronica Falcón as Madre Ismael (seasons 1–2)

== Episodes ==
=== Series overview ===
Series	Episodes	Originally released	
Series	Episodes	First released	Last released
1	13	26 May 2013	11 August 2013
2	10	5 October 2014	7 December 2014
3	10	24 July 2016	25 September 2016
4	10	29 July 2018	30 September 2018

=== Season 1 (2013) ===
No. overall	No. in season	Title	Directed by	Written by	Original release date
1	1	"Surprise Party"	Fernando Rovzar	Marcelo Slavich & Walter Slavich	26 May 2013
Ávila's regular job is selling insurance. He is married to Maria and they have a teenage son, Emiliano. Harmless enough from a distance, the man buried in this disguise conceals a ruthlessly efficient executioner. Kill Well to Live Better -- Author Unknown "There are no 'murderers'; just 'operatives'. No 'victims'; just 'issues'. No 'murders'; just 'jobs'.
2	2	"By the Book"	Fernando Rovzar	Marcelo Slavich & Walter Slavich	26 May 2013
Sr. Moreira, Ávila's boss, orders a new contract kill which will prove to be the hardest of his entire career. By completing the task, Ávila will be offered an opportunity that will change his life. "Unsolvable mistakes are grounds for immediate and definitive termination."
3	3	"A Lousy Job"	Fernando Rovzar	Marcelo Slavich & Walter Slavich	2 June 2013
Ávila accepts Sr. Moreira's proposal of taking over the business. This includes mentoring the psychotic and young Ismael. "A Don doesn't retire, or ask for permission. He doesn't quit."
4	4	"A Stranger In the Mirror"	Fernando Rovzar	Marcelo Slavich & Walter Slavich	9 June 2013
With increasing pressure on all sides, from his wife Maggie's panic attacks to owing his protege Ismael, Ávila seeks out his confessor and reveals his more human side. "Every operator has to have a job that justifies his earnings."
5	5	"Sr. Ávila"	Fernando Rovzar	Marcelo Slavich & Walter Slavich	16 June 2013
Newly in charge, 'Senor Ávila' learns that with his title comes new problems and responsibilities--the most pressing, an unresolved case that threatens the company's reputation. Elsewhere, Emiliano fights his attraction to Juliana. "A victim can never become a client, and vice versa."
6	6	"Reliquaries and Vampires"	Fernando Rovzar	Marcelo Slavich & Walter Slavich	23 June 2013
Sr. Ávila struggles with his first case as boss, while Ismael rises to the occasion. Emiliano pursues Juliana, who rejects him with unexpected consequences. Ávila desperately searches for Maggie, but soon realizes her problems will affect Iván and Ana. "Nothing or anyone is above the business."
7	7	"To Kill an Immortal"	Alejandro Lozano & Fernando Rovzar	Marcelo Slavich & Walter Slavich	7 July 2013
After learning of his son's possible criminal involvement, Sr. Ávila wonders whether killing runs in the family. Later, a new client, Ramiro provides a nearly impossible challenge and Emiliano discovers a strange connection between his father and Ismael. "The Don is responsible for all contracts."
8	8	"God's Whims"	Alejandro Lozano & Fernando Rovzar	Marcelo Slavich & Walter Slavich	7 July 2013
With Detective Sanchez hot on their trail, Emiliano reveals the whole truth to Ishmael. As Maria's suspicions increase, Iván gives Ávila a deadly warning. Struggling to take care of Ramiro's father, Ávila seeks help from an unlikely source. "All contracts must be finished, without exception."
9	9	"The Child and the Spiderweb"	Alejandro Lozano & Fernando Rovzar	Marcelo Slavich & Walter Slavich	14 July 2013
Ávila hands off an assignment to Tamara, a killer on the payroll who wants to return to work. While Ishmael tries to find Juliana, Emiliano makes a mistake that could have fatal repercussions. Determined to uncover the truth, Maria confronts her husband. "There is but one way to deal with risk: extermination."
10	10	"Neither Borges, Nor God"	Alfonso Pineda Ulloa & Fernando Rovzar	Marcelo Slavich & Walter Slavich	14 July 2013
As Sr. Ávila worries about his latest assignment, Iván sets out to learn what Ishmael is hiding. When Ávila finds himself caught in the crosshairs of Detective Sanchez's investigation, his marriage to Maria is threatened. "The Don must do whatever is necessary to protect the business."
11	11	"Freud and Ghosts"	Alfonso Pineda Ulloa & Fernando Rovzar	Marcelo Slavich & Walter Slavich	28 July 2013
Maria discovers shocking truths about her husband and son, who join forces and in the process come to an understanding. Emiliano makes a radical decision and Ávila asks Iván to investigate Sanchez, who finds that he's on his own. "A good operative investigates before acting."
12	12	"That Day"	Alfonso Pineda Ulloa & Fernando Rovzar	Marcelo Slavich & Walter Slavich	4 August 2013
Sr. Ávila jeopardizes his freedom by taking matters into his own hands as a desperate Sanchez stays on his case. Maria is startled by a familiar face who reveals another side to the man she thought she knew. Emiliano tries to get answers from an inscrutable Ana. "There are no live witnesses."
13	13	"A Child's Gaze"	Alfonso Pineda Ulloa & Fernando Rovzar	Marcelo Slavich & Walter Slavich	11 August 2013
Sr. Ávila faces threats from all sides and must decide how to handle his enemies--but a final act of vengeance changes everything. "The Don is the face of power."

=== Season 2 (2014) ===
No. overall	No. in season	Title	Directed by	Written by	Original release date
14	1	"Christ's Hitman"	Fernando Rovzar	Marcelo Slavich & Walter Slavich	5 October 2014
Ávila is given a new contract, which he cannot and must not question. Detective Sanchez gets a diligent new partner whose first case is to investigate the death of Emiliano Ávila. "Nothing kills a Don faster than his own guilt."
15	2	"Pies in the Face"	Fernando Rovzar	Marcelo Slavich & Walter Slavich	12 October 2014
Erika digs deeper into a case by pulling security footage; Iván accepts a new assignment and calls the perfect hit lady for the job; Maria meets Octavio, who tries to coax her out of a withdrawn state. "All Dons have an advisor they fully trust."
16	3	"The Master and the Watchmaker"	Fernando Rovzar	Marcelo Slavich & Walter Slavich	19 October 2014
Things between Sr. Ávila and Iván get complicated; Erika and Sanchez review the surveillance video from the night Ávila was attacked; Tamara executes her assignment with cinematic precision. "It is the magnet's duty to verify the authenticity of every job."
17	4	"Playing to be Someone Else"	Fernando Rovzar	Marcelo Slavich & Walter Slavich	26 October 2014
Iván calls into question Avila's ability to be the boss. Meanwhile, 'The Croatian' is getting closer to his objective, Erika is dangerously closing in on Ávila, and the plan to 'wake up' Maria is working. "Predators and prey. The business' basic premise."
18	5	"Compensation"	Alejandro Lozano & Fernando Rovzar	Marcelo Slavich & Walter Slavich	2 November 2014
Ávila and Erika give statements about the events at a restaurant where two robbers wound up dead. Their stories match, but Erika begins to recall details that don't square with the official version. "A Don is never wrong."
19	6	"The Good and the Bad Master"	Alejandro Lozano & Fernando Rovzar	Marcelo Slavich & Walter Slavich	9 November 2014
Ávila and 'The Croat' attempt to settle their recent impasse, but Ávila's response requires a meeting of the 'Board of Directors' whose verdict is the final word. Meanwhile, Octavio and Maria get dangerously close and the Chivalsik brothers, considered the best killers in town, accept a high-priced assignment. "The Council orders and the Don obeys."
20	7	"A Shot in the Mouth"	Alejandro Lozano & Fernando Rovzar	Marcelo Slavich & Walter Slavich	16 November 2014
The Chivalsik brothers make a deal with The Croat, as does Sr Ávila. Meanwhile, Maria suffers an attack that gives rise to unforeseen consequences; and Erika is piecing together a puzzle that keeps getting more and more complicated. "A good manipulator is a good killer."
21	8	"Beast's Mercy"	Fernando Rovzar	Marcelo Slavich & Walter Slavich	23 November 2014
While Sr. Ávila and Iván take on a complex case, Maria and Octavio hide somewhere they hope is beyond Ávila's reach as she has the evidence to nail her husband. Ávila has suspicions about the circumstances surrounding the death of his son Emiliano and decides to get to the bottom of things. "There is no room for pity."
22	9	"El Sr. Juárez"	Fernando Rovzar	Marcelo Slavich & Walter Slavich	30 November 2014
After Ávila ignores the Board's decision, which leaves a colleague dead, the Board must reconvene. Ávila also gets a new assignment involving Sr. Juarez - a Board member - whose son feels he is ready to take his father's place, and wants speed up the natural course of events. "Dons must be respected as partners of the same firm."
23	10	"Master of Masters"	Fernando Rovzar	Marcelo Slavich & Walter Slavich	7 December 2014
Ávila goes to great depths to erase incriminating evidence. Meanwhile, war has been declared on him by the Board of Directors and with limited options he tries to use their rules to his advantage and get out of his death sentence. "The Don of Dons is judge and executioner: The toughest job."

=== Season 3 (2016) ===
No. overall	No. in season	Title	Directed by	Written by	Original release date
24	1	"A Clown Roars into the Night"	Fernando Rovzar	Marcelo Slavich & Walter Slavich	24 July 2016
Sr. Ávila is now the "Boss of Bosses," but keeping his new position will be more difficult than getting it. "You do not negotiate respect; you take it."
25	2	"The Faceless Woman"	Fernando Rovzar	Marcelo Slavich & Walter Slavich	31 July 2016
Ávila is faced with a complicated case; Iván and Linares begin to work together; Sanchez gets a new partner. "In memory of Jose Gutierrez."
26	3	"Tha Hacking Bells"	Fernando Rovzar	Marcelo Slavich & Walter Slavich	7 August 2016
When a mysterious woman vanishes signs point to a mole in the organization. "Everything is allowed when the contract is the priority."
27	4	"The Puzzle"	Fernando Rovzar	Marcelo Slavich & Walter Slavich	14 August 2016
The Vulture is hiding something; Ávila will have to make a difficult decision. "What a Don fails to know becomes dirt for his grave."
28	5	"Gentlemen, Place Your Bets"	Alejandro Lozano	Marcelo Slavich & Walter Slavich	21 August 2016
Chance brings startling revelations. Ávila enters into a dangerous alliance. "In the end, all business is personal."
29	6	"Too Long of a Night"	Alejandro Lozano	Marcelo Slavich & Walter Slavich	28 August 2016
A shady character appears on the scene; the time has come to take a stand. "A Don is worth as much as his advisor."
30	7	"Rumors about a Dead Man"	Alejandro Lozano	Marcelo Slavich & Walter Slavich	4 September 2016
An attempted murder brings to light a mysterious criminal organization. "The exception always confirms the rule."
31	8	"A Ghost Named Molina"	Fernando Rovzar	Marcelo Slavich & Walter Slavich	11 November 2016
Iván and Ávila are on the trail of a ghost responsible for Duarte's death. "A Don rules by instinct."
32	9	"Puppets and Puppeteers"	Fernando Rovzar	Marcelo Slavich & Walter Slavich	30 November 2016
The appearance of a witness to Det. Duarte's death astonishes everyone. "Certainty rules."
33	10	"Twelve Names"	Fernando Rovzar	Marcelo Slavich & Walter Slavich	25 September 2016
Once again, Ávila goes against the rules of the Council, willing to do anything to get where he needs to be. Perhaps the only ending he can manage will turn out to be his own. "Fear also deserves respect."

=== Season 4 (2018) ===
No. overall	No. in season	Title	Directed by	Written by	Original release date
34	1	"Above and Below the Don"	Fernando Rovzar	Walter Slavich, Marcelo Slavich & Fernando Rovzar	29 July 2018
After recovering from his last season finale encounter, Sr. Ávila has to ignore his desire for vengeance to embrace a new ally to strengthen his standing in the organization first. "A Lord never declares war before being certain he has won it."
35	2	"Respectfully"	Tony Dalton	Walter Slavich, Marcelo Slavich & Fernando Rovzar	5 August 2018
Ávila entrusts boss Alvarado with a secret and very special hit. Iván becomes increasingly obsessed with power and status. Detective Sanchez makes a new friend in Alcoholics Anonymous. "The end is the only certainty a Don has from the beginning."
36	3	"God's Hobby"	Fernando Rovzar	Walter Slavich, Marcelo Slavich & Fernando Rovzar	12 August 2018
Ávila seems to gain ground against Cardozo. Iván receives a new assignment. Sanchez investigates the death of an old lady. Ana exerts more influence at the funeral home. "Never take a contract from an anonymous client.
37	4	"The Embalmed Wolf Is Sleeping"	Alejandro Lozano	Walter Slavich, Marcelo Slavich & Fernando Rovzar	19 August 2018
Ávila and Molina forge an alliance based on mutual distrust and continue to move forward with their plans. A surprise return puts Ávila in a compromised situation. "To think an overlord can be manipulated like a puppet does not turn the person into a puppet master, but into a dead man."
38	5	"All or Nothing"	Alejandro Lozano	Walter Slavich, Marcelo Slavich & Fernando Rovzar	26 August 2018
In order to exact revenge, Ávila and Molina will have to go to war. Cardozo calls for the head of his brother's murderer. Ana becomes more and more indispensable. "A Lord of Lords does not negotiate. His best offer is always his first."
39	6	"Be Careful What You Wish For"	Alejandro Lozano	Walter Slavich, Marcelo Slavich & Fernando Rovzar	2 September 2018
Complications with Molina's cousin and uncle threaten Molina and Ávila's plans. Ávila masterfully earns Cardozo's trust. Persico confronts Sanchez to get him out of the way. "Rules are a boss' greatest ally."
40	7	"The Ways of the Lord"	Alejandro Lozano	Walter Slavich, Marcelo Slavich & Fernando Rovzar	9 September 2018
Ávila leaves a trail of blood. Molina, badly wounded, seeks Ana's help. Everyone arrives at the funeral home, where surprises await... "Family is every Lord's ultimate weakness."
41	8	"My Way"	Alejandro Lozano	Walter Slavich, Marcelo Slavich & Fernando Rovzar	16 September 2018
Iván receives a proposal that involves an old friend. Ávila inches closer to exacting his revenge on the Apostles, but must pay a price. "A Lord of Lords must equally protect himself from those above as from those below."
42	9	"Get Away From Me"	Fernando Rovzar	Walter Slavich, Marcelo Slavich & Fernando Rovzar	23 September 2018
Ávila becomes a wanted man when the Department of Justice receives a dossier detailing his past murders. Iván reunites with an old flame. Detective Sánchez makes a final decision. "Revenge must be beneath any Lord."
43	10	"Kill Well to Live Better"	Fernando Rovzar	Walter Slavich, Marcelo Slavich & Fernando Rovzar	30 September 2018
Ávila learns a hard truth. Sánchez surprises everyone. Molina settles his debt with Ana. Everything comes to a head-- and possibly to an end-- at the funeral home, where it all began. Ana's true purpose is revealed. "Every Don should give his life to the organization."
