= Kristoff Raczyñski =

Mexican film director

Kristoff Raczyński (born June 9, 1974) is a Russian-born Mexican actor, film producer, screenwriter and TV host. His career began in the late 1990s and early 2000s when he produced, wrote and acted in the 2004 Mexican film Matando Cabos. He currently hosts a YouTube channel, Kristoff Cine, where he does film criticism. Raczyñski is often credited simply as "Kristoff".

== Early life ==
Raczyñski was born in Moscow to Polish parents. In 1982 his father took the entire family to Mexico City without knowing a single word in Spanish. Since then he has lived in Mexico City. Kristoff has said that he will always remember how his mother used to take him at 6 in the morning under -20 °C to obtain only 3 pieces of bread. At age 16, he worked cleaning elephant excrement in a circus. He earned his first wage working as a "cerillo" (Spanish word for "match", a popular way to call kids who work packing up grocery at supermarkets).

== Career ==
He began his career in the Centro de Educación Artística (CEA), Televisa's school of performing arts. He spent several years playing supporting characters in Mexican telenovelas like: Vivo Por Elena (1998) and Ramona (2000), among others. In 2001, Kristoff and Tony Dalton hosted Televisa's TV show No Te Equivoques (2001), with a high audience rating. The show was viewed as a Mexican version of Jackass.

In 2004, he produced, acted and co-wrote the Mexican film Matando Cabos with fellow actor Tony Dalton and was directed by Alejandro Lozano. In an interview, he said that the most risky decision that he has taken in his life was to leave No Te Equivoques to do Matando Cabos.

He likes music and his favorite singer is David Bowie. He likes the works of Pablo Picasso, especially Guernica. His main hobbies include reading books about quantum physics and playing video games.

In 2005, he began to do some collaborations with Horacio Villalobos in his television program Válvula De Escape and Desde Gayola on Telehit. In 2006, he began to host the program ID, which caused so much controversy that it won the public and producer Guillermo Del Bosque decided to give him a program of half an hour on Telehit. On Tuesday 6 May 2008, his program El Show Del Polaco began to air. The show was cancelled some months afterwards. Currently, he remains working for the same TV network.

In 2012, he wrote and directed the short film Confesiones de un table (also called Confesiones de un tabledance meaning "Confessions of a Tabledance"), produced by Ernesto Ahmad. This short film participated in the Short Film Corner of the Cannes Film Festival in that year. It was also featured in the International Film Festival of Guadalajara in 2013.

== Films ==
Year	Title	Role	Notes
2004	Matando Cabos	Mudo	Also co-writer
2016	Chapo: El escape del siglo	Larry	
2019	Loco fin de semana	Director	
2020	El Club de los Corazones Rotos	Director	TV Movie

== Television ==
Year	Title	Role
1998	Vivo Por Elena	Pecas
2000	Ramona	Davis
2000	Carita de ángel	Zenón
2003-2004	Desde Gayola	Ricardo
2009	Adictos	Moncho
2022	Sobreviviendo a los 30's	Director
