= Mauricio Barrientos =

Mexican actor, television host, comedian

- Born: Mauricio Barrientos; September 6, 1977 (age 47); Mexico City, Mexico
- Occupations: Stand-up comedian; Writer; Actor
- Years active: 2004–present

Mauricio Barrientos (professionally known as "El Diablito") is a Mexican actor, stand-up comedian, and writer. He is known for starring in films such as Compadres, Tod@s caen, and Un rescate de huevitos.

== Filmography ==
=== Film ===
Year	Title	Roles	Notes
2008	Navidad, S.A.	Tito	
2014	Amor de mis amores	Tomás	
2015	Labios & plumas		Short film
2016	Compadres	Porky	
2016	¿Qué culpa tiene el niño?	Arturo	
2017	El que busca encuentra	Cheps	
2018	Ahí viene cascarrabias	GP Sparrow (voice)	Animated film
2019	Loco fin de semana	El Diablito	
2019	Mentada de padre	Iker Márquez Castillo	
2019	Tod@s caen	Toby	
2021	Guerra de likes	Flavio	Amazon Prime Video original film
2021	Los dias que no estuve	Elí	Blim TV exclusive film
2021	The SpongeBob Movie: Sponge on the Run	Chancellor (voice)	Animated film Spanish dub
2021	Un rescate de huevitos	El Huevo de Águila Real (voice)	Animated film
2022	¡Qué despadre!	Montemayor	
2022	¿Y cómo es él?	Lucas	

=== Television ===
Year	Title	Roles	Notes
2004	Soñarás	Garfio / Monkey	
2004	Los Sánchez	Secuestrador	1 episode
2005	La vida es una canción		1 episode
2010	Motel Diablito	Host - Himself	
2013	Noches con Platanito	Himself	Guest star; 1 episode
2013	Stand Up Sin Fronteras	Himself	Guest star; 1 episode
2017	Se busca comediante	Himself	
2017	Corazón 39		
2018-2019	Comedy Central Duelo de Comediantes		
2018-2019	LOL: Last One Laughing	Contestant - Himself	Amazon Prime Video original series 12 episodes
2019	Claramente	Roque	12 episodes
2020	The House of Flowers	Xavier	Netflix original series 4 episodes
