= Pantelion Films =

American and Mexican film production company

- Pantelion logo used until 2021
- Type: Joint venture
- Industry: Entertainment
- Founded: 2010; 16 years ago
- Defunct: 2023; 3 years ago
- Fate: Liquidation and folded into ViX; Trademark still active
- Headquarters: Santa Monica, California, U.S.
- Key people: James M. McNamara; Paul Presburger (2010–2022); Edward Allen
- Products: Motion pictures Television programs
- Owners: Grupo Televisa (22.5%); TelevisaUnivision (27.5%); Lionsgate (50%)
- Website: www.pantelionfilms.com/about-us.html

Pantelion Films was an American and Mexican independent film production company that was created in 2010 and based in Santa Monica, California. The studio's goal was to bring wider theatrical distribution of movies aimed at Latino audiences. It was backed by TelevisaUnivision and Lionsgate Studios. Making theatrical relationships with movie exhibition chains including Regal Entertainment Group, AMC Theatres, Cinemex, and Cinemark, the studio raised the level of theatrically released Latino films. Under that arrangement, Pantelion was active with its own office from 2010 to 2023. The studio's first film was 2011's From Prada to Nada, which Lionsgate and Grupo Televisa announced it had commissioned for a television series that did not materialize in 2012. The studio's office was discontinued in 2023 and its website redirected in 2024 effectively ending the studio's operational lifecycle though not the usage of its trademark for existing unreleased if not future productions.

== History ==
Pantelion Films billed itself as the first major Latino Hollywood film studio. The studio was part of a transformation of Hollywood film studios that recognized in the early part of the 2010s that one of the fastest growing segments of the United States entertainment was Hispanic audiences. Pantelion Films' stature within the film industry was raised further when it successfully acquired the U.S. distribution rights to the 2012 Will Ferrell film, Casa de Mi Padre. The studio was able to move Latino films from strictly being limited release films to a wider, single weekend release on more than 200 screens simultaneously. This distribution practice was new to the United States with respect to Hispanic audiences and represented the first major attempt by a U.S. based studio to cater to Latino audiences in this manner.

The original chairman of Pantelion was James M. McNamara, former chief executive of Telemundo, its chief executive was former Lionsgate executive, Paul Presburger through 2022, and its chief operating officer was Edward Allen. Pantelion Films said that Latinos were the fastest growing segment of the movie going audience in the 2010s and were loyal DVD consumers. As Lionsgate released many of Tyler Perry's films which reached an African American audience, Lionsgate and Grupo Televisa were striving for similar success with Latino audiences. McNamara said, "Latinos don't see themselves reflected in Hollywood movies" and said the studio's goal was to change that in their film releases.

Pressberger said that the studio hoped to avoid the clichéd, stereotyped images of Latino life and culture. "We get out of the stereotypes of narco kings and drug dealers and gang members" in our films. Financially, tax breaks were "driving the decisions everywhere in the world," Presburger said as film companies including Pantelion looked to lower risks of investment through tax credit deals in the 2010s. An example of how Pantelion actively used tax breaks came in 2014 when it reached a multi-picture deal with Indomina Media of the Dominican Republic to produce up to four Spanish-language films annually to be released by Pantelion. The films were to be entirely produced in the Dominican Republic to take advantage of governmental film incentives.

== Business Objectives ==
Pantelion was not the first to target the Latino audience. Other attempts by U.S. studios to reach Latino audiences had met with little financial success. New Line Cinema struck a deal with the director of Mi Familia, Gregory Nava, to produce feature films for the Latino market. But that did not gain momentum and was discontinued. Other studios trying to reach the market were Samuel Goldwyn Films in the early 2000s and a venture between Universal Studios which had a distribution agreement with Arenas Entertainment, another Latino film and television series producer, was discontinued in 2003. As the first decade of the 2000s continued, some Spanish-language films received theatrical distribution from Latino-based exhibitors including Cinema Latino or on art circuits. But the business model of Pantelion was to have larger opening weekends in U.S. multiplexes than had ever been previously attempted instead of limited release and bicycling of a limited numbers of prints around the country.

The studio was able to place From Prada to Nada on 256 U.S. theater screens and the film brought in just over $3 million at the box office. The Los Angeles Times viewed the studio's first film as a "modest" box office success and noted the heavy television advertising on Univision in an attempt to reach audiences in the 21 cities in which the film was released. The studio's debut film received an ALMA Award given to Alexa Vega as Favorite Movie Actor in a Comedy or Musical. The film's success was significant enough that Televisa and Lionsgate extended their business relationship to include television program development, including the From Prada to Nada series announced in 2012. The studio's follow up film to Prada, No Eres Tú, Soy Yo, reached 226 theaters though brought in less money with $1.3 million. The studio also picked up the U.S. rights for the foreign film Saving Private Perez which was placed on 161 U.S. screens and brought in $1.4 million at the box office. The studio released the Will Ferrell film Casa de Mi Padre in 2012 which would become the studio's highest-grossing title to that point with a $5.9 domestic box office total. The film was described as an "homage to classic westerns and telenovelas" and shot in Spanish. The studio's follow-up film, Girl in Progress opened on Mother's Day weekend and would gross over $2 million domestically. In 2013, Pressburber said that his company made a slight shift from low budget films to "films that incorporate Latino talent and Latino themes but have universal appeal and can resonate with a broad commercial audience."

Pantelion's biggest successes came with star Eugenio Derbez whose Instructions Not Included led to a first-look deal with Derbez in 2014. The film set a record for the highest grossing Spanish-language film to date, earning $44.4 million in the United States and $99 million worldwide. The film opened on 348 screens in the United States on its first weekend handily winning the week's best per screen average with $22,547 per screen before expanding to 717 screens. Derbez's 2017 release How to Be a Latin Lover became the studio's highest weekend box office performer earning $12 million in the last weekend of April in 2017."

Pantelion also picked up its first English-language film when it obtained the North American rights to Paul Walker's film, Hours. Two weeks prior to the film's release date of December 13, 2013, Walker was killed in a car accident in Los Angeles, California on November 30, leaving Hours as the first film starring Walker to be released after his death. Pantelion's second English-language feature was announced as Summer Camp, starring Diego Boneta and directed by Alberto Marini, but was beaten to the theaters by George Lopez's Pantelion release, Spare Parts, and The Vatican Tapes. In 2015, Pantelion released Un Gallo con Muchos Huevos, which was the first wide theatrical release for a Mexican animated feature film.

== Streaming and Pantelion's Future ==
Late in 2016, Hemisphere Media Group partnered with Lionsgate to create a subscription video on demand service incorporating Pantelion's titles. The service, called Pantaya, was launched in August 2017. In 2021, Hemisphere Media Group acquired full ownership rights to the Pantaya streaming service from Lionsgate for $124 million, following the latter's decision to focus on the expansion of its Starz brand.

Subsequently, in May 2022, TelevisaUnivision reached a deal with Hemisphere Media Group to acquire Pantaya, targeting the platform in order to fortify their own ViX streaming service. The acquisition was completed on September 13 of that year. Following the acquisition's completion, Pantelion's social media was discontinued thereafter with Pantelion's web presence redirected to the ViX service in the summer of 2024. Remaining employee contacts from Pantelion were folded into the Lionsgate organization with the Pantelion office closed in 2023 effectively ending the studio's operational lifecycle as an independently-run arm of Lionsgate. The studio's name would likely remain in use until all productions reached completion and distribution. The Pantelion name is still considered an active trademark.

== Awards ==
The studio's debut film, "From Prada to Nada," received an ALMA Award nomination for Favorite Movie and won for Favorite Actress in a Comedy or Musical awarded to Alexa Vega. Pantelion's "Girl in Progress" won ALMA's Favorite Movie award in 2012. In 2019, Pantelion Films was awarded an Impact Award by the National Hispanic Media Coalition for their "Excellence in Production of Latino-Themed Content." "Radical" received a nomination for best feature film in the 2024 Imagen Awards.

== Films ==
Film	Release	Director(s)	Notes
From Prada to Nada	January 28, 2011	Angel Gracia	co-production with OddLot Entertainment and Gilbert Films; first film by Pantelion Films
Go For It!	May 13, 2011	Carmen Marron	co-production with Sparkhope Productions and Go For It! LCC
Labios rojos Red Lips	October 7, 2011	Rafa Lara	co-production with Cyclus Production; animated film; distribution only
No eres tú, soy yo	April 8, 2011	Alejandro Springall	distribution only
Saving Private Perez	September 2, 2011	Beto Gómez	co-production with Lemon Films; distribution only
Pastorela	December 2, 2011	Emilio Portes	distribution only
Secretos de familia Family Secrets	2012	Paco del Toro	co-Production with Gateway Films/Vision Video and Armagedón producciones; distribution only
El fantástico mundo de Juan Orol; The Fantastic World of Juan Orol	2012	Sebastián del Amo	co-production with Celuloide Films; distribution only
La Leyenda de la Llorona; Legend Quest: The Legend of La Llorona	2012	Alberto Rodríguez	co-production with Ánima Estudios; animated film; distribution only
Los Ilusionautas; The Illusionauts	2012	Eduardo Schuldt	co-Productions with Aronnax Studios; distribution only
La Última Muerte; The Last Death	February 10, 2012	David Ruiz	co-production with Lemon Films; distribution only
Casa de Mi Padre	March 16, 2012	Matt Piedmont	co-production with Gary Sanchez Productions and NALA Films
Girl in Progress	May 11, 2012	Patricia Riggen	co-production with Televisa Films, Anxiety Productions, and Latitude Entertainment
Hecho en México; Made in Mexico	November 30, 2012	Duncan Bridgeman	distribution only
El Santos vs. La Tetona Mendoza; The Wild Adventures of El Santos	2013	Alejandro Lozano	co-production with Átomo Films and Peyote Films; animated film; distribution only
Filly Brown	April 19, 2013	Youssef Delara; Michael D. Olmos	co-production with Silent Giant Entertainment, Olmos Productions, Indomina Releasing
Cinco de Mayo: La Batalla	May 3, 2013	Rafa Lara	co-production with Gala Films; distribution only
Instructions Not Included	August 30, 2013	Eugenio Derbez	co-production with Alebrije Cine y Video, Fulano Mengano y Asociados; highest-grossing film.
Nosotros los Nobles; The Noble Family	November 1, 2013	Gaz Alazraki	co-production with Alazraki Films; distribution only
Pulling Strings	October 4, 2013	Pitipol Ybarra	co-production with Trazende Films
Hours	December 13, 2013	Eric Heisserer	co-production with The Safran Company, Laguna Ridge Pictures, and PalmStar Media Capital
César Chávez	March 28, 2014	Diego Luna	co-production with Canana Films, Participant Media, and Televisa Cine
Cantinflas	August 29, 2014	Sebastián del Amo	co-production with Kenio Films
Mas Negro Que La Noche; Darker Than Night	September 26, 2014	Henry Bedwell	co-production with Itaca Films, CeLeste Films, Filmadora Nacional, and Neo Art Producciones; distribution only
Spare Parts	January 16, 2015	Sean McNamara	co-production with Televisa Cine, Circle of Confusion, Traveso Productions, and Brookwell-McNamara Entertainment
A La Mala; Falling for Mala	February 27, 2015	Pitipol Ybarra	distribution only
The Vatican Tapes	July 24, 2015	Mark Neveldine	co-production with Lakeshore Entertainment
Panic 5 Bravo	September 1, 2015	Kuno Becker	distribution only
Un gallo con muchos huevos Huevos: Little Rooster's Egg-cellent Adventure	September 4, 2015	Gabriel Riva Palacio Alatriste; Rodolfo Riva Palacio Alatriste	co-production with Huevocartoon Producciones; animated film
Ladrones; Thieves	October 9, 2015	Joe Menéndez	co-production with Panamax Films and Lantica Pictures
600 Miles	December 4, 2015	Gabriel Ripstein	co-production with Lucia Films; distribution only
Busco novio para mi mujer	February 19, 2016	Enrique Begné	co-production with Animal de Luz Films,
Summer Camp	March 18, 2016	Alberto Marini	co-production with Filmax Entertainment; distribution only
Pink...El rosa no es como lo pintan	2016	Paco del Toro	co-production with Gateway Films/Vision Video and Armagedón Producciones; distribution only
Compadres	April 22, 2016	Enrique Begné	co-production with Draco Films
No Manches Frida; With Frida?!?!	September 2, 2016	Nacho G. Velilla	co-production with Televisa Cine, Constantin Film, Alcon Entertainment, Rat Pack Film Production, and Neverending Media
La Leyenda del Chupacabras; Legend Quest: The Legend of Chupacabras	October 14, 2016	Alberto Rodríguez	co-production with Ánima Estudios; animated film; distribution only
Un Padre No Tan Padre; From Dad to Worse	January 27, 2017	Raul Martinez	co-production with Panorama Global; distribution only
Historietas assombradas: o filme Haunted Tales: The Movie	2017	Víctor-Hugo Borges	Co-production with Glaz entretenimento, Copa Studio and Warner Bros; distribution only (Folded by 9 Story Media Group)
Everybody Loves Somebody	February 17, 2017	Catalina Aguilar Mastretta	co-production with Ring Cine and Draco Films
How to Be a Latin Lover	April 28, 2017	Ken Marino	co-production with 3Pas Studios
3 Idiotas; 3 Idiots	June 3, 2017	Carlos Bolado	co-production with Neverending Films, Cutting Edge, and Greenlight Pictures; distribution only
Hazlo Como Hombre; Do It Like Hombre	September 1, 2017	Nicolás López	co-production with BH5 and Sobras International Pictures; distribution only
Condorito: La Película; Condorito: The Movie	January 12, 2018	Alex Orrelle; Eduardo Schuldt	co-production with Twentieth Century Fox, Aronnax Animation Studios and Pajarraco Films, LCC; distribution only
La Boda de Valentina; Valentina's Wedding	February 9, 2018	Marco Polo Constandse Córdoya	co-production with Filmadora Nacional
Cómplices	March 2, 2018	Luis Eduardo Reyes	co-production with Lantica Media; distributed by Cinetlan
La Leyenda del Charro Negro; Legend Quest: The Legend of the Charro Negro	March 23, 2018	Alberto Rodríguez	co-production with Ánima Estudios; distribution only with Cinetlan
Overboard	April 13, 2018	Rob Greenberg	co-production with Metro-Goldwyn-Mayer; remake of the 1987 film of the same name
Ya veremos	August 31, 2018	Pedro Pablo Ibarra	co-production with Sobras International Pictures and A Toda Madre Entertainment.
Perfect Strangers	January 11, 2019	Manolo Caro	Mexican remake of Perfetti sconosciuti
No Manches Frida 2	March 15, 2019	Nacho G. Velilla	Sequel to No Manches Frida
Tod@s Caen; Everybody Falls	August 30, 2019	Ariel Winograd	U.S. distribution
En brazos de un asesino	December 6, 2019	Matías Moltrasio	
Las pildoras de mi novio My Boyfriend's Meds	February 21, 2020	Diego Kaplan	
Un rescate de huevitos Little Eggs: An African Rescue	August 27, 2021	Gabriel Riva Palacio Alatriste; Rodolfo Riva Palacio Alatriste	co-production with Cinergistic Films and Huevocartoon Producciones
¿Y cómo es él? Backseat Driver	April 22, 2022	Ariel Winograd	
Cuando sea joven	September 23, 2022	Raúl Martínez	Co-production with 3Pas Studios
La Usurpadora, el musical La Usurpadora, the Musical	April 17, 2023	Santiago Limón	Co-production with The Lift Entertainment
Radical	October 20, 2023	Pitipol Ybarra	Co-production with Miercoles Entertainment, final film by Pantelion Films after its dissolution in 2023.
