= ¿Y cómo es él? (film) =

2022 Mexican romantic comedy film

- Theatrical poster with 2020 release date
- Directed by: Ariel Winograd
- Screenplay by: Paul Fruchbom
- Based on: Driving with my Wife’s Lover by Kim Tai-sik and Jun-han Kim
- Produced by: Eugenio Derbez; Ben Odell
- Starring: Zuria Vega; Mauricio Ochmann; Omar Chaparro
- Cinematography: Federico Cantini
- Edited by: Pablo Barbieri Carrera
- Music by: Andrés Levin; Ben Zebelman
- Production company: 3Pas Studios
- Distributed by: Pantelion Films
- Release date: 22 April 2022
- Running time: 96 minutes
- Country: Mexico
- Language: Spanish
- Box office: $4.6 million

¿Y cómo es él? (Spanish for "And What Is He Like?") is a 2022 Mexican romantic comedy film directed by Ariel Winograd. The film's title is inspired by the song of the same name performed by José Luis Perales, and a remake of the 2006 Korean film Driving with my Wife’s Lover. Its release was scheduled on 3 April 2020 in Mexico, but the premiere was postponed due to the COVID-19 pandemic. The film stars Zuria Vega, Mauricio Ochmann and Omar Chaparro. The film premiered on 22 April 2022.

== Plot ==
Jero (Omar Chaparro) is a businessman and taxi driver in a relationship with Marcia (Zuria Vega), who is married to Tomás (Mauricio Ochmann). Tomás tells Marcia that he is going on a trip to Puerto Vallarta for a job interview, but is really travelling to fight Jero.

== Cast ==
- Zuria Vega as Marcia
- Mauricio Ochmann as Tomás
- Omar Chaparro as Jero
- Miguel Rodarte as Juan Pablo
- Mauricio Barrientos as Lucas
- Consuelo Duval
