= Panic 5 Bravo =

- Directed by: Kuno Becker
- Written by: Kuno Becker
- Produced by: Fernando Perez Gavilan
- Starring: Kuno Becker; Catherine Papile; Dan Rovzar; Raul Mendez; Shalim Ortiz
- Cinematography: Juan Jose Saravia
- Edited by: Ethan Maniquis; Craig Nisker; Kuno Becker
- Music by: Carlo Siliotto
- Distributed by: Videocine
- Release date: 2013
- Running time: 96 minutes
- Countries: Mexico; United States
- Language: English

Panic 5 Bravo is an action-thriller film directed by Kuno Becker about American paramedics that become trapped on the Mexican side of the border and terrorized by a violent psychopath. It was released in the U.S. by Pantelion Films.

== Cast ==
- Kuno Becker as Alex
- Catherine Papile as Bobby
- Dan Rovzar as Josh
- Raul Mendez as Agustin
- Shalim Ortiz as Rafael
- Sofía Sisniega as Felicia
