= How to Be a Latin Lover =

- Theatrical release poster
- Directed by: Ken Marino
- Written by: Chris Spain; Jon Zack
- Produced by: Eugenio Derbez; Benjamin Odell
- Starring: Eugenio Derbez; Salma Hayek; Raphael Alejandro; Raquel Welch; Linda Lavin; Renée Taylor; Rob Corddry; Rob Riggle; Kristen Bell; Rob Lowe
- Cinematography: John Bailey
- Edited by: John Daigle
- Music by: Craig Wedren
- Production company: 3Pas Studios
- Distributed by: Pantelion Films
- Release date: April 28, 2017
- Running time: 116 minutes
- Country: United States
- Languages: English; Spanish
- Budget: $10-13 million
- Box office: $62.6 million

How to Be a Latin Lover is a 2017 American comedy film starring Eugenio Derbez, Salma Hayek, Raphael Alejandro, Raquel Welch, Rob Riggle, Rob Huebel, Rob Corddry, Renée Taylor, Linda Lavin, Kristen Bell, and Rob Lowe. This was also Welch's final film before she died in 2023. The film was directed by Ken Marino and written by Chris Spain and Jon Zack. The film follows a man who has spent his whole life married to a rich old woman, and must learn to make it on his own when she kicks him out. It was released on April 28, 2017 by Pantelion Films and grossed $62.6 million worldwide.

== Plot ==
Having made a career of seducing rich older women, Maximo marries a wealthy woman more than twice his age. Twenty-five years later, spoiled, out of shape, and bored from waking up next to his now 80-year-old wife, he is surprised when she dumps him for a younger McLaren car salesman.

Forced out of his mansion and desperate for a place to stay, he contacts Rick, another pampered gigolo. He crashes into the upscale playhouse of the woman's granddaughter, which does not go over very well. He soon moves in with his estranged sister, Sara, and her nerdy son, Hugo, in their small apartment.

Anxious to return to the lap of luxury, Maximo uses his nephew's crush on classmate Arden to get to his new target: her grandmother, Celeste, a widowed billionaire that Rick is also targeting. Maximo tries to reignite his charm as a Latin lover but fails at it miserably. Sara discovers her brother's scamming and kicks him out. While teaching Hugo some tricks he thinks work on women, Maximo finds himself bonding with his nephew, and this opens his heart to being less selfish and more thoughtful of others.

Eventually, Maximo becomes a gigolo for the woman Rick used to live with, and he patches up the relationship with his sister and nephew.

== Cast ==
- Eugenio Derbez as Maximo, an aging playboy who loses his life of wealth and luxury, and schemes to get it back
  - Noel Carabaza as Young Maximo
  - Vadhir Derbez as 21-year-old Maximo
- Salma Hayek as Sara, Maximo's estranged sister
  - Manelly Zepeda as Young Sara
- Raphael Alejandro as Hugo, Sara's nerdy son and Maximo's nephew.
- Rob Lowe as Rick the Gigolo, Maximo's equally wealthy friend.
- Kristen Bell as Cindy, a lonely and single woman, who works at a frozen yogurt shop and lives alone with her dozens of cats.
- Raquel Welch as Celeste Birch, Maximo's target and Arden's grandmother, whom Maximo tries to seduce in order to live a life of luxury once again. This was Welch's final film role before she died in 2023.
- Linda Lavin as Millicent Dupont, the wealthy woman whose gigolo Maximo finally becomes
- Renée Taylor as Peggy, Maximo's wealthy, but elderly, wife. She leaves Maximo for an unattractive, but younger car salesman.
- Rob Riggle as Scott
- Rob Huebel as Nick
- Rob Corddry as Quincy, Celeste's chauffeur
- Mckenna Grace as Arden, Hugo's crush.
- Mather Zickel as James, Sara's neighbor and love interest
- Michaela Watkins as Gwen, Sara's boss
- Michael Cera as Remy, a sleazebag car salesman who seduces Peggy
- "Weird Al" Yankovic as himself
- Ben Schwartz as Jimmy
- Jeffrey Scott Basham as Valet
- Omar Chaparro as Rafa
- José Eduardo Derbez as Drink Waiter

== Production ==
On June 5, 2015, it was announced that Eugenio Derbez and Benjamin Odell's Santa Monica-based production shingle 3Pas Studios and Televisa/Lionsgate joint venture Pantelion Films had bought an untitled original comedy script from Chris Spain and Jon Zack, with Lionsgate releasing under its first look deal. On October 26, 2015, Ken Marino was attached to direct the film, starring Derbez. On April 28, 2016, Rob Lowe, Kristen Bell, Raquel Welch and Rob Riggle joined the film's cast along with others including Renée Taylor, Rob Huebel, Michaela Watkins and Linda Lavin. On May 11, 2016, Mckenna Grace joined the cast.

== Release ==
The first trailer was released on December 21, 2016. The film was released on April 28, 2017 by Lionsgate's Pantelion Films.

=== Box office ===
How to Be a Latin Lover has grossed $32.1 million in the United States and Canada and $30.4 million in other territories for a worldwide total of $62.6 million, against a production budget of $10–13 million.

In North America, the film was released alongside The Circle, Sleight and Baahubali 2: The Conclusion, and was projected to gross about $7 million from 1,118 theaters in its opening weekend. The film ended up grossing $3.9 million on its first day and $12.3 million over the weekend, finishing second at the box office behind The Fate of the Furious. 89% of the opening weekend audience was Hispanic. The film grossed $5.1 million in its second weekend (a drop of 58%) and $3.9 million in its third (dropping just 25%), finishing 4th and 7th, respectively.

=== Critical response ===
On Rotten Tomatoes, the film has an approval rating of 40% based on 30 reviews, with an average rating of 4.8/10. The website's consensus reads, "How to be a Latin Lover inspires a few laughs from its talented ensemble, but it raises the question: Is bad representation better than no representation?" On Metacritic the film has a score 54 out of 100, based on 11 critics, indicating "mixed or average" reviews. Audiences polled by CinemaScore gave the film an average grade of "A" on an A+ to F scale.

Joe Leydon of Variety wrote: "There are some very funny bits and pieces scattered amid the proceedings, along with a few darkly comical gags that appear to belong in a different movie, but are more than welcome here."

=== Home media ===
How to be a Latin Lover was released on Digital HD on August 1, 2017, and was released two weeks later on Blu-ray and DVD on August 15, 2017.

== Remake ==
A French remake entitled How to Be a French Lover (Just a Gigolo in French-speaking markets) was released in April 2019. The film was directed by Olivier Baroux, co-written by Baroux and Kad Merad, and stars Merad, Anne Charrier, Pascal Elbé and Thierry Lhermitte among others.
