= Tony Dalton =

American and Mexican actor (born 1975)

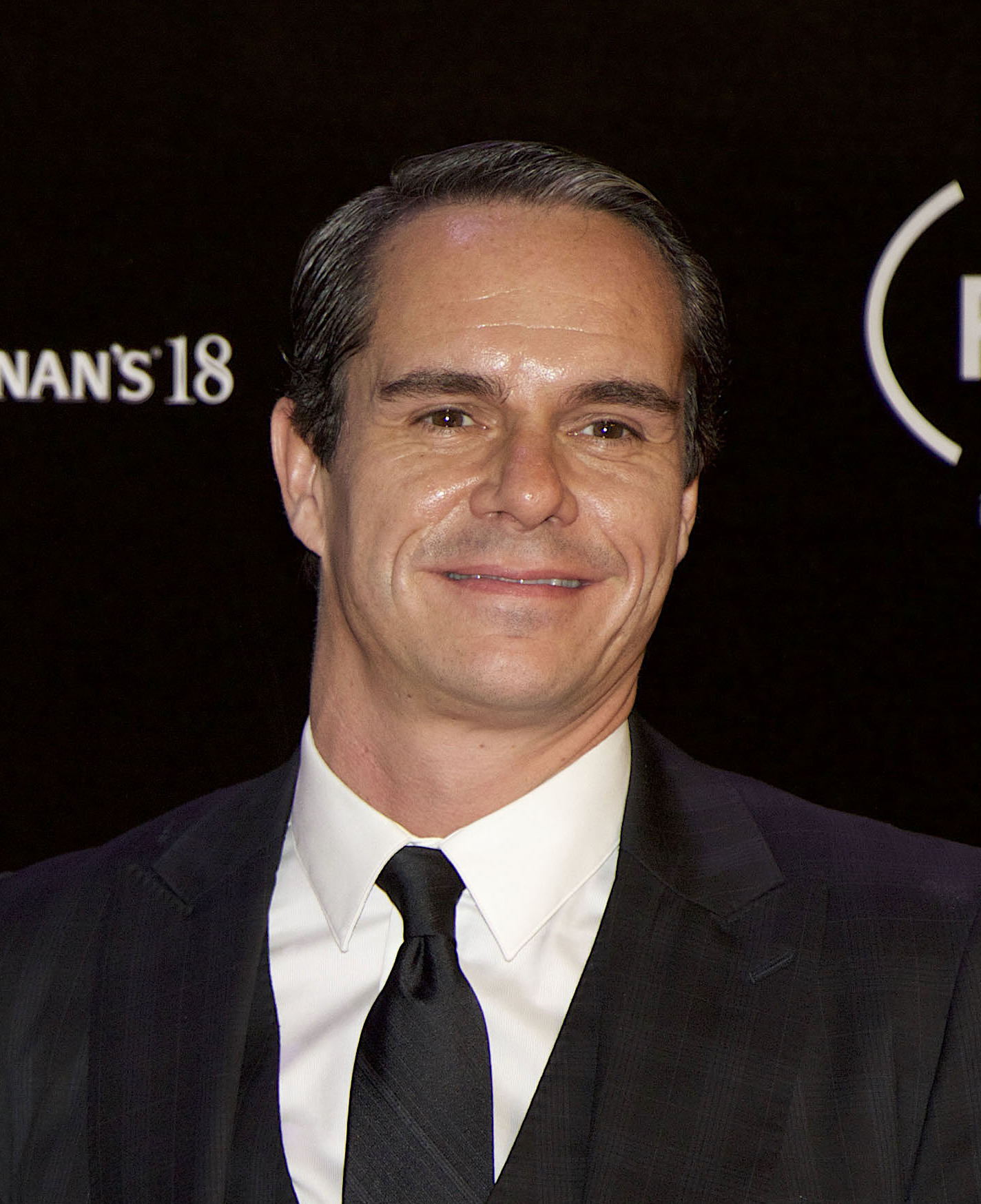
- Tony Dalton in 2018
- Born: Álvaro Luis Bernat Dalton; February 13, 1975 (age 51); Laredo, Texas, U.S.
- Citizenship: United States; Mexico
- Occupations: Actor; screenwriter
- Years active: 2000–present

Álvaro Luis "Tony" Bernat Dalton (born February 13, 1975) is an American and Mexican actor. For much of his career, he has acted in Mexican films, television shows, and stage plays. He is best known internationally for his portrayal of Lalo Salamanca in Better Call Saul (2018–2022). He has also appeared as Jack Duquesne / Swordsman in the Marvel Cinematic Universe television series Hawkeye (2021) and Daredevil: Born Again (2025–2026).

== Early life ==
Álvaro Luis Bernat Dalton was born in Laredo, Texas, on February 13, 1975, the son of an American mother and Mexican father, and grew up in Mexico City. He attended the Eaglebrook School in Deerfield, Massachusetts, before studying acting at New York City's Lee Strasberg Theatre and Film Institute.

== Career ==
Dalton's first major acting role was on the Mexican telenovela Rebelde (2004–2006). His first film role was in Matando Cabos (2004), which he also co-wrote. He later wrote and starred in Sultanes del Sur (2007). His other film credits include Violanchelo (2008) and The Perfect Dictatorship (2014). He also played a supporting role in the HBO Latin America series Capadocia (2008). He played the lead in the HBO series Sr. Ávila (2017), which won the International Emmy award for Best Non-English Language Series.

Dalton portrayed Lalo Salamanca in Better Call Saul (2018–2022), first appearing in the season 4 episode "Coushatta". His performance received critical acclaim, earning him nominations for two Screen Actors Guild Awards and two Saturn Awards, with some critics deeming Lalo one of the best villains on television. He was cast as Jack Duquesne in the miniseries Hawkeye (2021) after producer Trinh Tran was impressed with his performance in Better Call Saul.

== Acting credits ==
=== Film ===
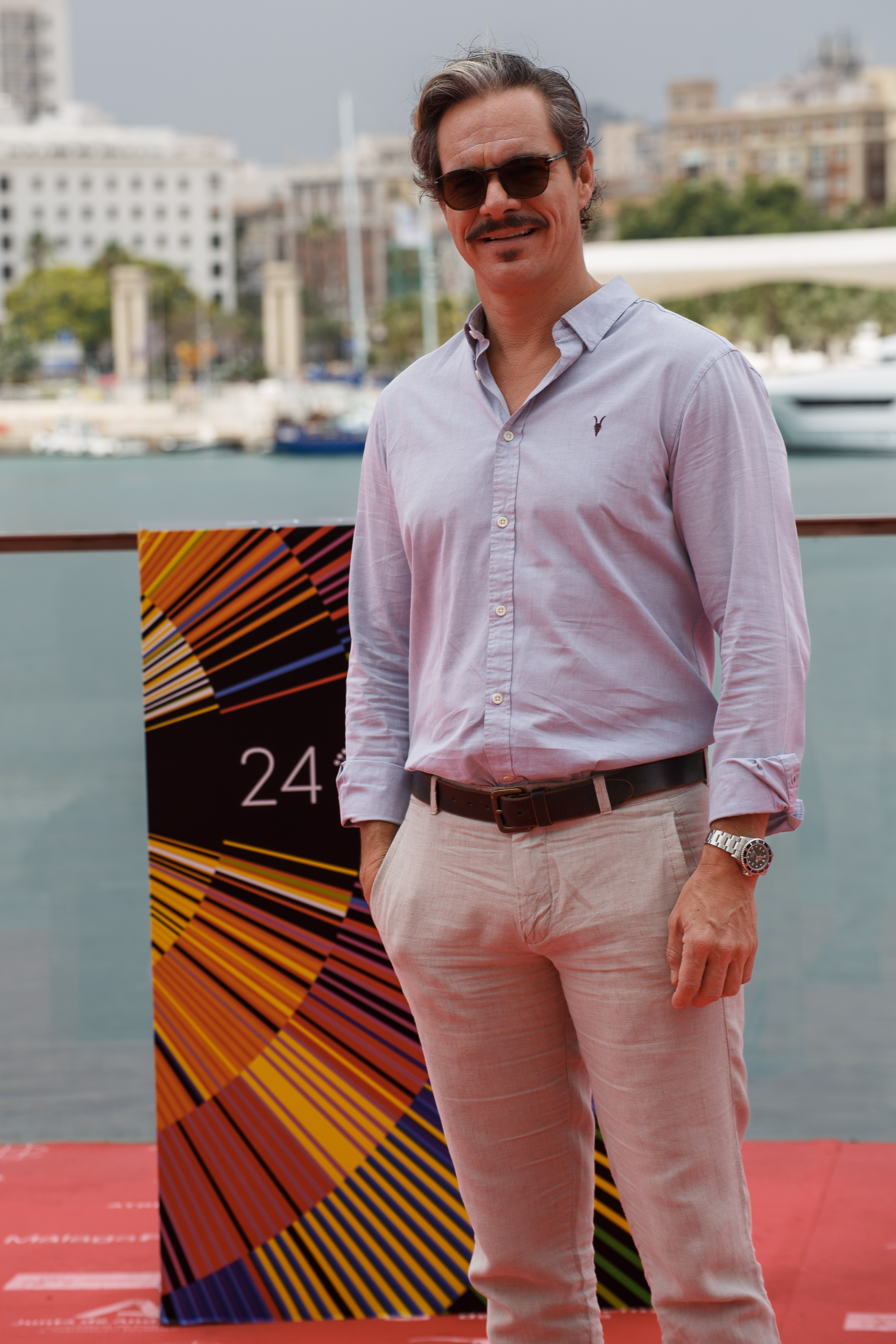
Dalton in 2021

Year	Title	Role	Notes
2004	Matando cabos	Javier "Jaque"	Also writer
2005	Volver, volver	Álex Quiroz	Short film
2006	Efectos secundarios	Gerardo	
2007	Sultanes del Sur	Carlos Sánchez	Also writer
2008	Violanchelo	Marco	
2009	Amar	Joel	
2010	Mano a mano	Miguel	Short film
2011	Colombiana	American Embassy 1	
2011	Amar no es querer	Samuel	
2012	La vida precoz y breve de Sabina Rivas	John	
2014	La dictadura perfecta	José Hartmann	
2017	April's Daughter	Álvaro	
2018	La boda de Valentina	Adrián Corcuera	
2018	Mexican Standoff	Mr. Stewards	Short film
2019	Ni tuyo, Ni mía	Roberto	
2020	Amalgama	Dr. Saúl Bravo	
2023	Dime lo que quieres (de verdad)	Diego	
2024	Turno Nocturno	Doctor	
2024	Las Mutaciones	Raúl	
2025	Trap House	Benito Cabrera	
2025	El mal	Thomas	

=== Television ===
Key
†	Denotes television productions that have not yet been released

Year	Title	Role	Notes
2000	Ramona	Tom	1 episode
2000	Mi destino eres tú	Police Officer	3 episodes
2001	No te equivoques	Himself	11 episodes
2002–2003	Clase 406	Dago García	2 episodes
2004–2006	Rebelde	Gastón Diestro	225 episodes
2007	Trece miedos	Jorge Sánchez	Episode: "Esquela"
2008–2009	Los simuladores	Mario Santos	31 episodes
2008–2010	Capadocia	Augusto Mateos	4 episodes
2011–2012	Flor Salvaje	Don Rafael Urrieta	150 episodes
2013–2018	Sr. Ávila	Roberto Ávila	43 episodes
2015	Dueños del paraíso	Renato Maldonado	67 episodes
2016–2017	Sense8	Lito's Agent	3 episodes
2018–2022	Better Call Saul	Lalo Salamanca	22 episodes
2021	Hawkeye	Jacques "Jack" Duquesne / Swordsman	6 episodes
2025–2026	Daredevil: Born Again	Jacques "Jack" Duquesne / Swordsman	6 episodes
2025	The Last of Us	Javier Miller	Episode: "The Price"
2025	Pluribus	Male Other	Voice; Episode: "La Chica o El Mundo" (uncredited)
2026	Sugar	Ray Vega	Second season

=== Video games ===
Year	Title	Role	Notes
TBA	Intergalactic: The Heretic Prophet	TBA	

=== Theater ===
- El año próximo a la misma hora (2009)
- Juegos de poder (2017)

=== Other projects ===
- Killing Cabos (2004), Writer
- Sultanes del Sur (2007), Writer
- Sr. Ávila (2013–2017), Director, season 4, episode 2 - Respetuosamente
- Dead in the Water podcast (2023–), Narrator

== Awards and nominations ==
Year	Award	Category	Work	Result
2021	Saturn Awards	Best Supporting Actor on Television	Better Call Saul	Nominated
2021	Actor Awards	Outstanding Performance by an Ensemble in a Drama Series	Better Call Saul	Nominated
2022	Saturn Awards	Best Supporting Actor on Television	Better Call Saul	Nominated
2022	Saturn Awards	Best Guest-Starring Performance in a Streaming Television Series	Hawkeye	Nominated
2023	Actor Awards	Outstanding Performance by an Ensemble in a Drama Series	Better Call Saul	Nominated

Tony Dalton has been nominated for both Saturn and Actor Awards but has not won.
