= Matando Cabos =

- Poster
- Directed by: Alejandro Lozano
- Written by: Tony Dalton; Alejandro Lozano; Kristoff Raczyñski
- Starring: Tony Dalton; Ana Claudia Talancón; Pedro Armendáriz Jr.; Kristoff Raczyñski; Raúl Méndez; Joaquín Cosío; Gustavo Sánchez Parra
- Cinematography: Juan Jose Saravia
- Edited by: Alberto De Toro
- Production company: Videocine
- Distributed by: Videocine
- Release date: 16 July 2004
- Running time: 94 minutes
- Country: Mexico
- Language: Spanish

Matando Cabos ("Killing Cabos") is a 2004 Mexican crime comedy film directed by Alejandro Lozano. The film was written by Lozano, along with Tony Dalton and Kristoff Raczynski.

Although the film garnered mixed reviews from critics, it was well received by the public and has since gained a cult following.

== Plot ==
Jaque finds himself in a terrible situation after being caught having sex with the daughter of the dreaded businessman Oscar Cabos, who is also his boss. The following day, still reeling from the savage beating he received, Jaque is unexpectedly confronted by Mr. Cabos himself. In a twist of fate, Cabos accidentally trips and loses consciousness. Sensing an opportunity, Jaque quickly enlists the help of his friend Mudo.

Leaving Cabos in his office, they come across a childhood friend who now works as the company's janitor. This friend had been betrayed by Cabos in the past and sees this as an opportunity for revenge. He decides to steal Cabos' valuable clothes and wear them himself.

When Jaque and Mudo return, they find Cabos half-naked and decide to take him to the bathroom while they contemplate their next move. Meanwhile, the janitor, who is now disguised as Cabos, leaves the building to retrieve his car. Unfortunately for him, he is intercepted by two kidnappers who mistake him for Cabos, knocked unconscious and has a sack put on his head. Unexpectedly, one of the kidnappers turns out to be the janitor's own son, seeking to make his father's boss pay for his actions.

Back in the bathroom, Jaque and Mudo decide that to avoid any potential accusations, they must take Cabos with them and then figure out what to do next. They hastily flee the scene with Cabos in their car. As they leave the parking lot, they find themselves at a streetlight, face-to-face with the kidnappers. Both groups are aware that they have a body in their respective car trunks, adding to the tension of the encounter. In a nervous attempt to appear casual, they exchange smiles and then continue in opposite directions.

While Jaque and Mudo are driving, they encounter an impolite bus driver who cuts them off. This sparks a confrontation, with Jaque insulting the driver by calling him "cross-eyed." This remark strikes a nerve with the driver, triggering memories of past rejection due to his physical appearance. Enraged, the bus driver retaliates by ramming his bus into Jaque's car before fleeing the scene. The impact causes the car's trunk to become stuck, preventing Jaque and Mudo from removing Cabos from the vehicle.

In need of assistance, Mudo contacts his friend, the legendary pro wrestler Ruben "Mascarita" (who despises being called Mascarita), and his bodyguard, Tony "the Cannibal," a man-eating dwarf. Together, they devise a plan to dispose of Cabos' body by taking him to his own house, where a massive party is taking place. They intend to make Cabos believe that he drank himself into unconsciousness. After toasting to their plan's success, a fight breaks out in the bar where they are discussing their strategy. "Mascarita" takes on multiple opponents while Tony handles another group. Amidst the chaos, Jaque and Mudo make their escape, leaving Tony behind.

Simultaneously, the kidnappers arrive at a girl's house and tie up their captive, still believing he is Cabos. They attempt to call Cabos' house and demand a ransom from his wife. However, due to confusion and the maid's repeated hang-ups, the wife interprets the calls as excuses for Cabos not attending the party and dismisses them.

Exhausted from the bar fight, "Mascarita," Mudo, and Jaque head to Jaque's apartment to change clothes for the party. As Jaque selects a presentable shirt, Mudo and "Mascarita" become irritated by their neighbor's noisy bird. They knock on the neighbor's door to complain but receive no response. Just as they are about to leave, Jaque's girlfriend arrives, furious with him for standing her up and not taking her to her father's party. In her anger, she takes Jaque's car, unaware that Cabos is still inside.

Finally, when Mudo and "Mascarita" hear the neighbor's voice, Mudo loses his temper and screams at him to silence the bird. The neighbor, known for his eccentricity, opens the door and points two guns at their faces, emphasizing his emotional attachment to the bird and warning them not to complain again. Jaque intervenes, urging them to leave.

Ironically, Jaque's girlfriend's friend is actually an ally of the kidnappers. She arrives at her friend's house and convinces her to accompany them to Cabos' party. The leader of the kidnappers poses as her boyfriend, and the trio makes their way to the party. Inside the party, a series of mix-ups occur, resulting in the accidental dumping of Cabos' friend and leaving Cabos himself in Jaque's house. Cabos eventually returns home and discovers his wife engaging in sexual activity with Tony. In a fit of rage, Cabos chases Tony, only to stumble upon his friend lying unconscious in the yard. Seething with anger, Cabos strikes his friend with a golf club.

== Cast ==
- Tony Dalton as Jaque
- Kristoff Raczyñski as Mudo
- Ana Claudia Talancón as Paulina Cabos
- Pedro Armendáriz Jr. as Oscar Cabos
- Joaquín Cosio as Ruben
- Raúl Méndez as Botcha
- Gustavo Sánchez Parra as Nico
- Rocío Verdejo as Lula
- Silverio Palacios as Tony 'El Cannibal'
- Jacqueline Voltaire as Gabriela Cabos
- Pedro Altamirano as Nacho
- Norman Sotolongo as Cholo
- José Ángel Bichir as Ulises
- Alejandro Galán as Juan
- Mary Paz Mata as Tere

== Sequel ==
A sequel, titled Matando Cabos 2: La Máscara del Máscara, was released directly to Prime Video on October 1, 2021. The film, written and directed by Lozano, received mostly negative reviews.

Tony Dalton and Kristoff Raczyñski, co-writers and stars of the first film, were not affiliated with the sequel.
