= List of Mexican films of 2022 =

This is a list of Mexican films released in 2022.

English title	Original title	Director	Cast	Genre	Notes
Bardo, False Chronicle of a Handful of Truths	Bardo, falsa crónica de unas cuantas verdades	Alejandro G. Iñárritu	Daniel Giménez Cacho, Griselda Siciliani, Ximena Lamadrid, Iker Sanchez Solano, Jay O. Sanders	Epic, Black comedy, Comedy-drama	Nominated - Golden Lion at the 79th Venice International Film Festival Winner - UNIMED Award at the 79th Venice International Film Festival Nominated - Best Foreign Language Film & Best Cinematography at the 35th Chicago Film Critics Association Awards Mexican entry for the Best International Feature Film at the 95th Academy Awards Nominated - Best Cinematography at the 95th Academy Awards
Daughter of Rage	La hija de todas las rabias	Laura Baumeister de Montis	Ara Alejandra Medal as María, Carlos Gutiérrez, Virginia Raquel Sevilla García, Diana Sedano, Noé Hernández	Drama	An international co-production with Nicaragua, the Netherlands, Germany, France and Norway Nominated - New Directors Award at the 70th San Sebastián International Film Festival Winner - Best Project of the VIII Europe-Latin America Co-production Forum, EFADs-CAACI Award & Artekino International Prize at the 70th San Sebastián International Film Festival Winner - Biarrots Award & French Syndicate of Film Critics Award at the Biarritz Latin America Festival Nominated - First Feature Award at the Miami International Film Festival Nominated - New Direction Competition at the Cleveland International Film Festival Nominated - Best First Feature Film at the 10th Platino Awards Winner - Cine Latino Jury Award at the San Francisco International Film Festival Nominated - Best Picture at the 27th Lima Film Festival
Finding the End of the World	Encontrando el fin del mundo	Fabián Corres	Fabián Corres, Alba Alonso, Emiliano Corres, Ximena Duggan, Alberto Guerra, Thali García, Mateo Corres, Fernanda Castillo, Ramon Medina, Noe Sanz	Drama	Winner - Best Feature Film & Best Director in a Feature Film at the Love & Hope International Film Festival Winner - Best Director in a Long Feature Film at the Austin International Art Festival
Goya		Pablo Orta	Eutimio Fuentes, Mateo Valles, Ruth Ramos	Drama	Winner - Best Mexican Film - Audience Award at the 37th Guadalajara International Film Festival Winner - Best Feature Film, Best Director, Best Actor for Eutimio Fuentes & Best Cinematography at the Oklahoma Latino Film Festival
Guillermo del Toro's Pinocchio		Guillermo del Toro & Mark Gustafson	Gregory Mann, Ewan McGregor, David Bradley, Burn Gorman, Ron Perlman, John Turturro, Finn Wolfhard, Cate Blanchett, Tim Blake Nelson, Christoph Waltz, Tilda Swinton	Musical, Dark fantasy	An international co-production with United States and France Winner - Best Animated Film at the 76th British Academy Film Awards Nominated - Best Original Score & Best Production Design at the 76th British Academy Film Awards Winner - Best Animated Feature at the 28th Critics' Choice Awards Nominated - Best Score & Best Song "Ciao Papa" at the 28th Critics' Choice Awards Winner - Best Animated Feature Film at the 80th Golden Globe Awards Nominated - Best Original Score & Best Original Song "Ciao Papa" at the 80th Golden Globe Awards Winner - Best Animated Feature Film at the 95th Academy Awards
Home Is Somewhere Else		Carlos Hagerman & Jorge Villalobos	Jasmine, Evelyn & Elizabeth, José Eduardo Aguilar "El Deportee"	Documentary	Nominated - Contrechamp Award at the Annecy International Animated Film Festival Nominated - Best Documentary Feature Film at the Morelia International Film Festival Winner - Documentary Audience Award at the San Diego Latino Film Festival
Huesera: The Bone Woman	Huesera	Michelle Garza Cervera	Natalia Solián, Alfonso Dosal, Mayra Batalla, Mercedes Hernández, Sonia Couoh, Aida López	Supernatural horror, Body horror	Winner - Best New Narrative Director & Nora Ephron awards at the 2022 Tribeca Festival
Huevitos congelados		Gabriel Riva Palacio Alatriste & Rodolfo Riva Palacio Alatriste	Bruno Bichir, Maite Perroni, Angélica Vale, Carlos Espejel, Miguel Rodarte, Arath de la Torre, Mauricio Castillo, Vadhir Derbez	Adventure, Comedy	Fifth part of the Huevos film series Premiered on 14 December on Vix+
I Don't Want to Be Dust	No quiero ser polvo	Iván Löwenberg	Bego Sainz, Anahí Allué, Agustina Quinci, Romina Coccio, Manuel Poncelis, Eduardo Azuri, Mónika Rojas, Luis Felipe Castellanos, J.C. Montes-Roldan, Gerardo Monzalvo, Iván Lowenberg, Rodrigo Cuevas, Mariana Leon Lambarri, Ilse Miranda, Luciana Islas, Magda Vizcaíno, Edurne Keel, Ingrid Lowenberg, Keyla Wood	Drama	Nominated - Golden Pyramid Award at the 44th Cairo International Film Festival Winner - Mexican Fiction Feature Film Nominated - Audience Award - Feature Film at the 15th Milwaukee Film Festival Nominated - Best Mexican Fiction Feature Film at the 19th Monterrey International Film Festival Nominated - Mexico Dentro Del Canvas - Best Film at the 7th Black Canvas Contemporary Film Festival Competition - Best Fiction Film at the 12th Feratum International Fantastic Film Festival Winner - Best Direction at the 12th Feratum International Fantastic Film Festival Premiered commercially on 4 January 2024 in Mexican theaters
Incomplete Lovers	Amores incompletos	Gilberto González Penilla	Alejandro Camacho, Patricia Bernal, Flor Eduarda Gurrola, Hoze Meléndez, Juan Carlos Colombo, Leonardo Flores, Héctor Jiménez, Manuel Landeta, Edwarda Gurrola, Adolfo Madera, Johanna Murillo, Hernán Mendoza, Silverio Palacios, Oscar Quiñones, Gisela Madrigal, Gabriela Roel	Comedy-drama	Premiered on 11 November Los Cabos International Film Festival Premiered commercially on 30 March 2023 in Mexican theaters
The Kings of the World	Los reyes del mundo	Laura Mora Ortega	Carlos Andrés Castañeda, Davison Florez, Brahian Acevedo, Cristian Campaña, Cristian David Duque	Drama, Road Movie	An international co-production with Colombia, Luxembourg, France & Norway Winner - Golden Shell, Feroz Zinemaldia Award & SIGNIS Awards at the 70th San Sebastián International Film Festival Colombian entry for the Best International Feature Film at the 95th Academy Awards
Love & Mathematics	Amor y matemáticas	Claudia Sainte–Luce	Roberto Quijano, Diana Bovio, Marco Alfonso Polo, Homero Guerra	Comedy	Winner - Best actor at the Havana Film Festival New York Nominated - Best International Film at the Göteborg Film Festival
MexZombies		Chava Cartas	Iñaki Godoy, Marcelo Barceló, Roberta Damián, Luciana Vale, Vincent Webb, Daniel Tovar, Bárbara de Regil	Thriller, Comedy horror	Premiered on 26 October on Vix+
Mirreyes contra Godínez 2: El retiro		Chava Cartas	Daniel Tovar, Regina Blandón, Alejandro de Marino, Diana Bovio	Comedy	Premiered on 21 July on Vix+ Sequel to the 2019 film Mirreyes contra Godínez
My Mother-in-law Hates Me	Mi suegra me odia	Andres Feddersen	Loretto Bernal, Itatí Cantoral, Jerry Velázquez, Willy Semler, Alexis de Anda	Comedy	Premiered on 22 December in Mexican theaters
La nave		Batan Silva	Pablo Cruz, Santiago Beltrán Ulrich, Maya Zapata, Lucía Uribe, Andrés Almeida, Rodrigo Murray, Héctor Jiménez, Victor 'Chore' Sobrevals	Comedy	Nominated - Best Actor for Pablo Cruz at the Canacine Awards
Noise	Ruido	Natalia Beristain	Julieta Egurrola, Gabriela Núñez, Nicolasa Ortiz-Monasterio, Brenda Yañez, Sofía Correa, Mauricio Calderón, Erick Israel Consuelo, Teresa Ruiz, Kenya Cuevas, Jimena González, Adrián Vázquez, Mariana Giménez, Mariana Villegas, Arturo Beristáin, Pedro de Tavira Egurrola, Mónica del Carmen, Alphonso Escobedo	Drama	Winner - Spanish Cooperation Award at the San Sebastián International Film Festival Nominated - Horizons Award at the San Sebastián International Film Festival Nominated - Gold Hugo - International Feature Film at the Chicago International Film Festival Nominated - Best Feature Film at the Morelia International Film Festival
Northern Skies Over Empty Space	El norte sobre el vacío	Alejandra Márquez Abella	Gerardo Trejoluna, Paloma Petra, Dolores Heredia, Mayra Hermosillo, Francisco Barreiro, Mariana Villegas, Fernando Bonilla, Juan Daniel García Treviño, Raúl Briones, Marco García, Yahir Alday, Gabriel Almaguer, Bebo Cantú, Gabriel Nuncio, Camille Mina, Pato Alvarado, Diego García, Mariel Alanís, Aglae Lingow, Leonardo Huerta, Carlos Lenin, Ernesto Treviño, Oliver Cantú Lozano, Hamish Anderson	Drama	Nominated - Panorama Audience Award at the 72nd Berlin International Film Festival Winner - Best Mexican Feature Film, Best Screenplay & Best Actor for Gerardo Trejoluna at the Morelia International Film Festival Premiered on 28 October on Amazon Prime Video
A Not So Merry Christmas	Reviviendo la Navidad	Mark Alazraki	Mauricio Ochmann, Ana Brenda Contreras, Manu Na, José Sefami, Paula Espinoza, Romina Poza, Bastian Calva, Verónica Bravo, Alfonso Borbolla, Aldo Escalante, Hernán Del Riego, Andrew Ortega, Lucero Trejo, Emilio Echevarría	Christmas, Fantasy, Comedy	Premiered on 20 December on Netflix
Ojos que no ven		Alfonso Zarate	Arcelia Ramírez, Fernanda Castillo, Flavio Medina, Matías López, Héctor Kotsifakis, Claudia Santiago, Luciana González De León, Azucena Acevedo, Karla Garrido, César González	Psychological thriller	Nominated - Best Actress for Arcelia Ramírez at the Canacine Awards Nominated - Best Actor for Flavio Medina at the Canacine Awards Nominated - Best First Work at the Diosas de Plata
The Pool of the Nobodies	La alberca de los nadies	José Luis Solís Olivares	María Mercedes Coroy, Alex Bautista, Manuel Domínguez, Antonio Trejo Sánchez, Katzir Meza, Carlos Gueta, David Colorado, Bety Mancia, Verónica Andrés Jesús	Drama	Winner - Best Actress at the International Film Festival of Mérida and Yucatán Winner - Best Feature Film, Best Feature Director, Best Feature Actress for María Mercedes Coroy & Best Feature Actor for Alex Bautista at the Caracas Iberoamérica Film Festival Winner - Best International Feature Film at the Fabrique Du Cinéma Awards Winner - Best Human Rights Feature Film at the Mannheim Arts and Film Festival Winner - Best Narrative Feature Film at the Barcelona Planet Film Festival
Presencias		Luis Mandoki	Alberto Ammann, Yalitza Aparicio, Andrea Santibañez, Leo Danse Alos, Ariel Bonilla, Analy Castro, Cher Constantine, Adriana Deangelis, Emelia Levy, Daniel Mandoki, Fermín Martínez, Raúl Orozco, Norma Pablo, Angelina Peláez, Alisson Santiago, Gerardo Taracena, Marco Antonio Treviño, Josué Maychi	Horror, Thriller	Premiered on 26 October on Vix+
La Provisoria		Melina Fernández da Silva & Nicolás Meta	Andrés Ciavaglia, Ana Pauls, Juan Chapur, Sol Bordigoni, Nicolás Juárez, Albertina Vázquez	Comedy-drama	An international co-production with Argentina, Chile, Brazil, Colombia & France
¡Qué despadre!		Pedro Pablo Ibarra	Mauricio Ochmann, Fiona Palomo, Sandra Echeverría	Comedy	Winner - Best Newcomer - Female for Fiona Palomo at the 2023 Canacine Awards Nominated - Best Film & Best Director at the 2023 Canacine Awards Nominated - Best Supporting Actor for Juan Diego Covarrubias, Best Newcomer - Female for Fiona Palomo & Best Music at the 2023 Diosas de Plata
The Realm of God	El reino de Dios	Claudia Sainte–Luce	Diego Armando Lara Lagunes, Margarita Guevara González, Lizbeth Nolasco Hernández, Mariano Chávez Chávez, Diógenes Ivan Delfín Elvira, Alfredo Pantoja Gallego, Michelle Guevara González, Oswaldo Molina Arzola, Yair Castro, Cipriana Castro Chávez, Jorge Escobedo Kaliman	Drama	Winner - Best Mexican Film, Best Director, Best Actor for Diego Armando Lara Lagunes, Best Cinematography & Best Film - Young Jury Award at the Guadalajara International Film Festival Winner - Best Direction & Best Feature Film Directed by a Woman at the Gijón International Film Festival
Red Shoes	Zapatos rojos	Carlos Eichelmann Kaiser	Eustacio Ascacio Velázquez, Natalia Solián, Phanie Molina, Miguel Ángel Valencia	Drama	Nominated - Golden Star at the Marrakech International Film Festival Nominated - Best Feature Film at the Morelia International Film Festival Winner - Best Cinematography at the Málaga Spanish Film Festival Nominated - Best Iberoamerican Film at the Málaga Spanish Film Festival
Robe of Gems	Manto de gemas	Natalia López Gallardo	Nailea Norvind, Juan Daniel García Treviño, Sherlyn Zavala, Balam Toledo, Mario Torres, Adriana Gallardo, Israel Sánchez, Francisco Berdiales, Reina Carmona	Drama	Winner - Silver Bear - Jury Award at the 72nd Berlin International Film Festival Nominated - Golden Bear at the 72nd Berlin International Film Festival Nominated - Zabaltegi-Tabakalera Award at the 70th San Sebastián International Film Festival Nominated - Best New Directors Feature at the Nashville Film Festival Nominated - Special Award for the Promotion of Gender Equality at the Sarajevo Film Festival Winner - Best Director at the Morelia International Film Festival Nominated - Best Mexican Feature Film Nominated - Bright Horizons Award at the Melbourne International Film Festival
The Substitute	El suplente	Diego Lerman	Juan Minujín, Bárbara Lennie, Alfredo Castro, Rita Cortese, María Merlino	Drama	An international co-production with Argentina, Spain, Italy & France Winner - Best Supporting Performance at the 70th San Sebastián International Film Festival Winner - Best Director at the 22nd Havana Film Festival New York
Tell Me About Yourself	Háblame de ti	Eduardo Cortés	Germán Bracco, Martín Saracho, Arcelia Ramírez, Julio Bracho	Coming-of-age, Comedy-drama	Winner - Best Newcomer - Male for Germán Bracco at the 2023 Canacine Awards Nominated - Best Newcomer - Male for Martín Saracho at the 2023 Canacine Awards Nominated - Best Newcomer - Female for Isidora Vives at the 2023 Canacine Awards
Trigal		Anabel Caso	Emilia Berjón Ramírez, Abril Michel, Alberto Guerra, Nicolasa Ortíz Monasterio, Úrsula Pruneda, Patricia Ortiz, Gerardo Trejo Luna, Memo Villegas	Drama	Nominated - Best Feature Film at the Morelia International Film Festival Nominated - Best Supporting Actress for Nicolasa Ortiz Monasterio & Úrsula Pruneda, Best Breakthrough Performance for Emilia Berjón, and Best First Work at the 65th Ariel Awards
Two Plus Two	Dos más dos	Alfonso Pineda Ulloa	Arath de la Torre, Adriana Louvier, Luis Ernesto Franco, Tessa Ía, Claudio Lafarga, Martha Claudia Moreno, Juan Carlos Remolina, Florencia Benitez, Daniel Haddad, Adriana Montes de Oca, Mairen Muñoz, Artús Chávez, Brenda De Arrigunaga, Patricio Zamora	Sex comedy	Remake of the 2012 Argentine film 2+2. Premiered on 31 March in Mexican theaters
Valentino, Be Your Own Hero Or Villain	Valentino, puedes ser tu propio héroe o villano	Alfonso Pineda Ulloa & Alejandro Ricaño	David Chocarro, Dulce María, Mauricio Argüelles, Artús Chávez, Adriana Montes de Oca, Adriana Llabres, Daniel Haddad, Tato Alexander, Ari Albarrán, Alexia Alexander, Irina Baeva, Sofía Campomanes, Ryan Carnes, Ximena Córdoba, Arturo de La Rosa, Adriana Fonseca, Julián Gil, Elizabeth Guindi, Martha Claudia Moreno, Regina Orozco, Natalia Payan, Claudia Ramírez, José Sefami, Horacio Trujillo, Minnie West	Comedy	
Voy a pasármelo bien		David Serrano	Raúl Arévalo, Karla Souza, Dani Rovira, Raúl Jiménez, Jorge Usón, Izán Fernández, Renata Hermida Richards, Rodrigo Díaz, Rodrigo Gibaja, Michel Herráiz	Musical, Comedy	In co-production with Spain Nominated - Best Comedy Film at the 10th Feroz Awards Nominated - Best New Actor for David Lorente at the 78th CEC Medals
We Will Never Belong	Nunca seremos parte	Amelia Eloisa	Adriana Palafox, Magnolia Corona, Verónica Langer, Andrea Portal, Cynthia Bordes, Karina Hurtado, Xésar Tena	Coming-of-age, Drama	Winner - Audience Award - Best Narrative Feature at the Inside Out Toronto 2SLGBTQ+ Film Festival
Where Birds Go To Die	Donde los pájaros van a morir	Analeine Cal y Mayor	Flavio Medina, Sofía Sisniega, Alejandra Ambrosi, Claudia Lobo, Orlando Moguel, Harding Junior, Enrique Arreola, Yuriria del Valle, Steve Kisicki, Mika Kubo	Comedy-drama	Premiered 24 November in Mexican theaters in Mexico City Premiered on 27 January 2023 on Vix+
Who's a Good Boy?	El Guau	Ihtzi Hurtado	Sebastian Dante, Sirena Ortiz, Adrian Vazquez, Grettell Valdez.	Comedy	Premiered on 23 November on Netflix
¿Y cómo es él?		Ariel Winograd	Zuria Vega, Mauricio Ochmann, Omar Chaparro.	Romantic comedy	Remake of the 2006 Korean film Driving with my Wife’s Lover

== Box office ==
The ten largest-grossing Mexican films of 2022, by in-year domestic box office revenue, are as follows:

Highest-grossing films of 2022
Rank	Title	Distributor	Admissions (million)	Domestic gross (million Mex$)
1	¿Y cómo es él?	Videocine	1.000	65.2
2	¡Qué despadre!	Videocine	0.889	55.9
3	Mal de ojo	Cinépolis Distribución	0.612	35.4
4	El exorcismo de Dios	Imagem	0.609	35.4
5	Cuando sea joven	Videocine	0.566	33.1
6	Soy tu fan	Disney	0.483	32.7
7	La exorcista	Disney	0.310	17.7
8	Karem, la posesión	Videocine	0.290	16.9
9	Lecciones para canallas	Cinépolis Distribución	0.245	12.7
10	Cuarentones	Corazón	0.151	8.9
