= 65th Ariel Awards =

2023 Mexican film awards

- Date: 9 September 2023
- Site: Teatro Degollado; Guadalajara, Mexico

Highlights
- Best Picture: Northern Skies Over Empty Space
- Most awards: Bardo, False Chronicle of a Handful of Truths (8)
- Most nominations: Huesera: The Bone Woman (17)

Television coverage
- Network: Canal 22

The 65th Ariel Awards ceremony, presented by the Mexican Academy of Cinematographic Arts and Sciences, took place at the Teatro Degollado in Guadalajara, Jalisco on 9 September 2023.

== Nominees ==
The nominations were read at Museo Tamayo de Arte Contemporáneo on 20 June 2023. They are listed as follows:

Best Picture: Northern Skies Over Empty Space; Bardo, False Chronicle of a Handful of Truths; Huesera: The Bone Woman; La caída; La civil	Best Director: Alejandro González Iñárritu – Bardo, False Chronicle of a Handful of Truths; Natalia Beristáin – Noise; Michelle Garza Cervera – Huesera: The Bone Woman; Alejandra Márquez Abella – Northern Skies Over Empty Space; Lucía Puenzo – La caída
Best Actor: Daniel Giménez Cacho – Bardo, False Chronicle of a Handful of Truths; Álvaro Guerrero – La civil; Cuauhtli Jiménez – Finlandia; Hernán Mendoza – The Box; Gerardo Trejoluna – Northern Skies Over Empty Space	Best Actress: Arcelia Ramírez – La civil; Marta Aura – Coraje; Julieta Egurrola – Noise; Natalia Solián – Huesera: The Bone Woman; Karla Souza – La caída
Best Supporting Actress: Úrsula Pruneda – Trigal; Mayra Batalla – Huesera: The Bone Woman; Dolores Heredia – Northern Skies Over Empty Space; Martha Claudia Moreno – Huesera: The Bone Woman; Nicolasa Ortiz Monasterio – Trigal	Best Supporting Actor: Raúl Briones – Northern Skies Over Empty Space; Fernando Bonilla – Northern Skies Over Empty Space; Juan Daniel García Treviño – La civil; Jorge A. Jiménez – La civil; Francisco Rubio – Bardo, False Chronicle of a Handful of Truths
Best Breakthrough Performance: Emilia Berjón – Trigal; Eustacio Ascacio – Red Shoes; Déja Ebergengi – La caída; Diego Armando Lara – El reino de Dios; Isabel Luna – Huesera: The Bone Woman	Best Original Screenplay: Abia Castillo, Michelle Garza Cervera — Huesera: The Bone Woman; Alejandra Márquez Abella, Gabriel Nuncio — Northern Skies Over Empty Space; Mónica Herrera, Samara Ibrahim, Tatiana Mereñuk, Lucía Puenzo, María Renée Prudencio — La caída; Paula Markovitch, Laura Santullo, Lorenzo Vigas — The Box; Habacuc Antonio de Rosario, Teodora Mihai — La civil
Best Cinematography: Darius Khondji — Bardo, False Chronicle of a Handful of Truths; Claudia Becerril Bulos — Northern Skies Over Empty Space; Nur Rubio Sherwell — Huesera: The Bone Woman; Dariela Ludlow — Noise; Serguei Saldívar Tanaka — Red Shoes	Best Original Score: Camilla Uboldi — Red Shoes; Bryce Dessner, Alejandro G. Iñárritu — Bardo, False Chronicle of a Handful of Truths; Philip Glass, Leonardo Heiblum — Cartas a distancia; Tomás Barreiro — Northern Skies Over Empty Space; Gibrán Andrade, Rafael Manrique — Huesera: The Bone Woman
Best Sound: Nicolas Becker, Martín Hernández, Ken Yasumoto, Frankie Montano, Jon Taylor, Santiago Núñez — Bardo, False Chronicle of a Handful of Truths; Pablo Betancourt, Zulu González, Yuri Laguna, Gerardo Villareal — Northern Skies Over Empty Space; Christian Giraud, Pablo Lach, Omar Pareja — Huesera: The Bone Woman; Jean-Stephane Garbe, Federico González Jordán, Valérie Le Docte — La civil; Thomas Becka, Carlos Cortés, Raúl Locatelli, Victor Tendler — Robe of Gems	Best Editing: Alejandro G. Iñárritu — Bardo, False Chronicle of a Handful of Truths; Miguel Schverdfinger — Northern Skies Over Empty Space; Adriana Martínez — Huesera: The Bone Woman; Alain Dessauvage — La civil; Miguel Schverdfinger — Noise
Best Art Direction: Eugenio Caballero — Bardo, False Chronicle of a Handful of Truths; Sandra Cabriada — Northern Skies Over Empty Space; Ana Bellido — Huesera: The Bone Woman; Daniela Schneider — The Box; Nohemí González — Red Shoes	Best Makeup: Adam Zoller — Huesera: The Bone Woman; Lucy Betancourt — Bardo, False Chronicle of a Handful of Truths; Pedro Guijarro — Northern Skies Over Empty Space; Marco Jiménez — Finlandia; Alfredo García — La civil
Best Costume Design: Anna Terrazas — Bardo, False Chronicle of a Handful of Truths; Amanda Cárcamo — Northern Skies Over Empty Space; Mayra Juárez — The Mighty Victoria; Estrella Vázquez — Finlandia; Gabriela Gower — Huesera: The Bone Woman	Best Special Effects: Raúl Camarera, Gustavo Campos, Miguel Ángel Rodríguez, Juan Carlos Santos — Huesera: The Bone Woman; Luis Eduardo Ambriz — Northern Skies Over Empty Space; Elliot Rebollar Feregrino — The Mighty Victoria; Gregorio Vega López — La caída; Yoshiro Hernández, Roberto Ortiz — Mal de ojo
Best Visual Effects: Guillaume Rocheron, Olaf Wendt — Bardo, False Chronicle of a Handful of Truths; Raúl Luna — Northern Skies Over Empty Space; Raúl Luna — Huesera: The Bone Woman; Raúl Luna — La exorcista; Mevlana Rumi, Ariel Gordon — Mal de ojo	Best First Work: Huesera: The Bone Woman; Robe of Gems; Pedro; Trigal; Red Shoes
Best Ibero-American Film: Argentina, 1985 (Argentina); 1976 (Chile); The Beasts (Spain); Carajita (Dominican Republic); The Kings of the World (Colombia)	Best Documentary Feature: Dioses de México; Teorema de tiempo; Cartas a distancia; Home Is Somewhere Else; Users
Best Animated Feature Film: Home Is Somewhere Else; Águila y Jaguar: Los guerreros legendarios	Best Short Film: Agustina; Aire; El grillo; En cualquier lugar; Pitbull
Best Animated Short Film: El año del radio; Bouclette; K8; La melodía torrencial; Los cuervos	Best Documentary Short Film: Las nubes son de música; La evaluación; Mi reino; Mira el cielo; No te agüites
