= List of Mexican films of the 2020s =

A list of the most films produced in the Cinema of Mexico ordered by year of release in the 2020s. For an alphabetical list of articles on Mexican films see Category:Mexican films.

== 2020 ==
- List of Mexican films of 2020

== 2021 ==
- List of Mexican films of 2021

== 2022 ==
- List of Mexican films of 2022

== 2023 ==
- List of Mexican films of 2023

== 2024 ==
- List of Mexican films of 2024

== 2025 ==
- List of Mexican films of 2025
