= Pablo Cruz =

Pablo Cruz may refer to:

- Pablo Cruz (soccer) (born 1991), American soccer player
- Pablo Cruz (actor) (born 1984), Mexican actor

== See also ==
- Pablo Cruise, American band
