= Murder of Paola Buenrostro =

Paola Buenrostro was a transgender woman whose murder started a movement to recognize and address transfemicide in Mexico. Buenrostro, a sex worker, was killed on September 30, 2016 by a security guard who confessed to killing her after he realized from her voice that she was transgender. Following her murder, her friend Kenya Cuervas Fuentes founded the organization Casa de las Muñecas Tiresias, whose advocacy eventually contributed to the passage the of Paola Buenrostro Law, which criminalizes transfemicide and guarantees the rights of victims' chosen families in order to respect their gender identities.

== Murder of Paola Buenrostro ==
On September 30, 2016, Paola Buenrosto entered the car of Arturo Felipe Delgadillo Olvera, who was soliciting her services. Delgadillo, a security guard, was armed with a gun designated for use on the job. Almost immediately after the car started moving, he shot Buenrostro. Kenya Cuevas Fuentes, a friend of Buenrostro, witnessed the shooting and she, other sex workers and police detained Delgadillo and brought him before the Cuauhtémoc district attorney office. Two days later, judge Gilberto Cervantes Hernández released Delgadillo, claiming a lack of evidence that Delgadillo was responsible for shooting Buenrostro. Throughout the investigation, Buenrostor was referred to by male names, despite her female identity, or as "the deceased" or "the sex worker"

On October 5, Cuevas El 5 de octubre de 2016, Cuevas, together with other trans women, held a demonstration on Avenida Insurgentes protesting the murder of transgender women and calling for the recognition of the basic human rights of trans people.

== Aftermath ==
In 2018, in response to the murder, Kenya Cuevas founded the organization Casa de las Muñecas Tiresias with the mission of improving recognition and defense of LGBTQ+ human rights, as well as the Casa Hogar Paola Buenrostro in 2019, Mexico's first shelter specifically for trans women.

In 2019, Mexico City's Commission of Human Rights recommended that the attorney general's office declare transfemicide to be its own crime, which had not previously been proposed. Ernestina Godoy, the attorney general, accepted the recommendation and in 2021 made a public apology for the behavior of the authorities during and after the investigation of Buenrostro's murder.

Delgadillo Olvera remained at large, which prompted Cuevas to place a $500,000 peso bounty on his capture and detention, so that he could be charged for transfemicide.

== Paola Buenrostro Law ==
The Paola Buenrostro Law sought to classify transfemicide as its own crime, in order to better respect the gender identities of victims, prevent re-victimization, and empower victims' chosen families. On October 5, 2021, representative Temístocles Villanueva Ramos, of Morena, presented a bill to the Congress of Mexico City to criminalize transfemicide with a sentence of 35 to 70 years in prison.

The bill was written in collaboration with Cuevas and the LGBTQ+ rights organizations Casa de las Muñecas Tiresias and Letra S, and specifically changed parts of the civil penal code, the policy of the attorney general's office, and the victims' law, to classify transfemicide as a crime and guarantee legal recourse for victims. In 2022, Villanueva tried unsuccessfully to bring the bill to a vote, but was able to present the bill on March 25, 2024.

On July 18, 2024, the Congress of Mexico City passed the bill, with 54 votes in favor and one opposed. In addition to criminalizing transfemicide, the Paula Buenrostro law stipulates that, in the case where the biological family of the victim does not claim their body or rejects their gender identity or expression, it may be returned to the victim's chosen family. Death records may also be filed by chosen family, so that they correctly reflect a person's gender identity.

Contemporaneously, on March 1, 2024, the legislature of Nayarit passed a criminal code reform criminalizing transfemicide, with a maximum sentence of 60 years, becoming the first state to do so.
