= Ariel Award for Best Breakthrough Performance =

- Awarded for: Best performance of an acting artist in a breakthrough role.
- Country: Mexico
- Presented by: AMACC
- First award: 2019
- Currently held by: Victor Miguel Prieto, En El Camino (2026)
- Website: premioariel.com.mx

The Ariel Award for Best Breakthrough Performance (Spanish: Premio Ariel a Mejor Revelación Actoral) is a recent award presented by the Academia Mexicana de Artes y Ciencias Cinematográficas (AMACC) in Mexico. It has been awarded since the 2019 edition, replacing both breakthrough gender-specific categories. It is awarded in honor of the performance of an acting artist in a breakthrough role.

Four actors have been the winners of the statuette, Benny Emmanuel was the first winner for his performance De la Infancia (2018). The current holder of the award is Victor Miguel Prieto for En El Camino.

== Winners and nominees ==
Table key
‡	Indicates the winner

Year	Director(s)	Film	Ref.
2019 (61st)	Benny Emmanuel‡	De la Infancia	
2019 (61st)	Agustina Quinci	The Chambermaid	
2019 (61st)	Alan Uribe	The Chambermaid	
2019 (61st)	Bernardo Velasco	Museum	
2019 (61st)	Nancy García	Roma	
2020 (62nd)	Juan Daniel García Treviño‡	I'm No Longer Here	
2020 (62nd)	Azul Giselle Magaña Ruiz	Asfixia	
2020 (62nd)	Coral Puente	I'm No Longer Here	
2020 (62nd)	Johanna Heidi Fregoso	Asfixia	
2020 (62nd)	Eduardo Banda	Huachicolero	
2021 (63rd)	Indira Rubie Andrewin‡	Tragic Jungle	
2021 (63rd)	Ana Laura Rodríguez	Identifying Features	
2021 (63rd)	Juan Jesús Varela	Identifying Features	
2021 (63rd)	Leonardo Nahim Nájar Márquez	Los Lobos	
2021 (63rd)	Maximiliano Nájar Márquez	Los Lobos	
2022 (64th)	Adrián Ross‡	Summer White	
2022 (64th)	Alejandra Camacho	Prayers for the Stolen	
2022 (64th)	Giselle Barrera	Prayers for the Stolen	
2022 (64th)	Israel Rodríguez	The Other Tom	
2022 (64th)	Julia Chávez	The Other Tom	
2023 (65th)	Emilia Berjón‡	Trigal	
2023 (65th)	Eustacio Ascacio	Red Shoes	
2023 (65th)	Déja Ebergengi	La Caída	
2023 (65th)	Diego Armando Lara	The Realm of God	
2023 (65th)	Isabel Luna	Huesera: The Bone Woman	
2024 (66th)	Naíma Sentíes‡	Tótem	
2024 (66th)	Danae Ahuja Aparicio	Valentina o la Serenidad	
2024 (66th)	Rocío de la Mañana	Adolfo	
2024 (66th)	Saori Gurza	Tótem	
2024 (66th)	Ikal Paredes	El Último Vagón	
2024 (66th)	Santiago Sandoval	Heroico	
2025 (67th)	José Alberto Patiño‡	We Shall Not Be Moved	
2025 (67th)	Ale Cosío	La Arriera	
2025 (67th)	Andrés Revo	Hombres Íntegros	
2025 (67th)	Jairo Hernández	Sujo	
2025 (67th)	Miguel Valverde	Fiesta en la Madriguera	
2025 (67th)	Sofía Quezada	Armas Blancas	
2026 (68th)	Victor Miguel Prieto	En El Camino	
2026 (68th)	Aurora Dávila	Vainilla	
2026 (68th)	Carolina Guzmán	La Reserva	
2026 (68th)	Donovan Said	El Diablo Fuma (y guarda las cabezas de los cerillos quemados en la misma caja)	
2026 (68th)	Laura Uribe Rojas	El Diablo Fuma (y guarda las cabezas de los cerillos quemados en la misma caja)	

== See also ==
- Academy Juvenile Award
- BAFTA Rising Star Award
