= Transgender Europe =

European umbrella association for transgender rights

- Abbreviation: TGEU
- Formation: 2 February 2005
- Type: Registered association
- Purpose: to work for the rights of trans people
- Headquarters: Berlin, Germany
- Coordinates: 52.48489°N 13.45535°E
- Region served: Europe, Central Asia
- Members: 569 (2025)
- Official language: English
- Chair: Isa Nico Borrelli
- Staff: 14 (2025)
- Website: tgeu.org

Transgender Europe (TGEU) is a European umbrella organisation which aims to combat discrimination against transgender people, as well as supporting the rights and wellbeing of transgender individuals. It was founded in 2005 in Vienna during the first European Transgender Council and it is currently operating as a registered association in Berlin.

Since April 2009, TGEU has run the Trans Murder Monitoring (TMM) research project, which records the many people who are murdered every year around the world as a result of anti-trans violence.

== History ==
TGEU was established on the first European Transgender Council in Vienna in November 2005 and formally registered as an Austrian charitable organisation 14 months later. TGEU was run as a volunteer organisation for many years. In 2008 TGEU acquired their first independent project-based funding. However, it took until 2009 to hire first project staff (to implement the TvT project). In 2012 the General Assembly held in Dublin decided to move the seat of the organisation to Berlin, a process that was finalised with the closing of the Austrian association at the General Assembly held in Budapest in 2014.

In 2016, TGEU’s Sex Work Policy was enthusiastically acclaimed and adopted by the General Assembly at the European Transgender Council in Bologna, Italy. Thanks to the efforts of trans activists in Central Asia, the General Assembly voted to broaden the mandate TGEU to also include Central Asia at the European Transgender Council 2018 in Antwerp, Belgium.

As of 2025, TGEU is headquartered in Berlin, Germany, and has a team of fourteen staff members and a board. With over 200 member organisations in almost 50 countries, TGEU continues to combine advocacy work in Europe and Central Asia with community work in partnership with member groups.

== Research ==
=== Trans Murder Monitoring ===
The Trans Murder Monitoring (TMM) project systematically monitors, collects, and analyses reports of homicides of trans and gender-diverse people worldwide. The Trans Murder Monitoring project started in April 2009 as a cooperation between Transgender Europe and the academic online magazine Liminalis – A Journal for Sex/Gender Emancipation and Resistance. With the involvement of the editorial team of Liminalis, the TMM became a pilot project of Transgender Europe's "Transrespect versus Transphobia Worldwide" research project in September 2009.

The latest TMM update (2026) revealed a total of 273 trans and gender diverse individuals who were recorded as having been murdered between 1 October 2025 and 30 September 2026. Nearly all of the reported murders (95%) were transfemicides. 69% of these murders occurred in Latin America and the Caribbean, with Brazil accounting for 32% of the total. Since 2009, TGEU’s monitoring has recorded over 5.500 murders of transgender and gender diverse people worldwide.

=== Trans Rights Index & Maps ===
The Trans Rights Index & Maps are launched in May each year and reflect the current legal situation in countries throughout Europe and Central Asia. The 2020 edition of the Index provides detailed information on the legal situation of all 47 Council of Europe member States and five Central Asian countries. It covers a total of 30 indicators in six legal categories: legal gender recognition, asylum, bias-motivated speech and violence, non-discrimination, health, and family. The Maps focus specifically on two legal gender recognition (LGR) indicators that stigmatise and violate the rights of trans people: forced sterilisation and mandatory mental health diagnosis. Each of the respective maps illustrates which countries demand these problematic LGR requirements.

== Memberships ==
According to the German Bundestag’s lobby register, TGEU is a member of the following organisations:

- ILGA-Europe – European region organisation of ILGA World
- NELFA aisbl – Network of European LGBTIQ* Families Associations
- Social Platform – European organisation working on social issues
- INCO – International NGO Conference at the Council of Europe

== See also ==
- LGBTQ rights in Europe
- LGBTQ rights in the European Union
- List of transgender-rights organizations
- Transgender rights in Germany
- Transgender rights movement
