= La nave (film) =

- Theatrical release poster
- Directed by: Batan Silva
- Written by: Pablo Cruz
- Produced by: Pablo Cruz; Alejandra Cárdenas; Arturo Zarate
- Starring: Pablo Cruz-Guerrero
- Cinematography: Guillermo Granillo
- Edited by: Eugenio Richer; Mariana Rodríguez
- Music by: Andrés Almeida
- Production company: Sin Sentido Films
- Release date: May 12, 2022
- Running time: 93 minutes
- Country: Mexico
- Language: Spanish
- Box office: $276,902

La nave (lit. 'The ship') is a 2022 Mexican comedy film directed by Batan Silva and written, starred & co-produced by Pablo Cruz. It is based on real experiences of the writer, protagonists and co-producer Pablo Cruz. It premiered on May 12, 2022, in Mexican theaters.

== Synopsis ==
A presenter of a children's radio program called La nave will embark on one of the most difficult missions he has ever had to live: try to fulfill the wish of a child who wants to know the sea

== Cast ==
The actors participating in this film are:

- Pablo Cruz as Miguel
- Santiago Beltrán Ulrich as Gerardo
- Maya Zapata as Leo
- Lucía Uribe as Daisy
- Andrés Almeida as Doctor
- Rodrigo Murray
- Héctor Jiménez
- Victor 'Chore' Sobrevals as GYM student

== Reception ==
=== Critical reception ===
Jesús Chavarría of the newspaper La Razón of Mexico: "In La nave, between the almost artisan manufacturing they materialize the extraordinary of the everyday, taking advantage of practical objects and costumes with ingenuity, allowing themselves suggestive animated inserts that connect the spasms and regressions of the protagonist, with the child's gaze and the environment, to finish outlining with touches of reverie and melancholy the identity of a simple and charming and very enjoyable proposal."

=== Accolades ===
Year	Award	Category	Recipient	Result	Ref.
2023	Canacine Awards	Best Actor	Pablo Cruz	Nominated	
