= Transfemicide =

Intentional killing of trans women

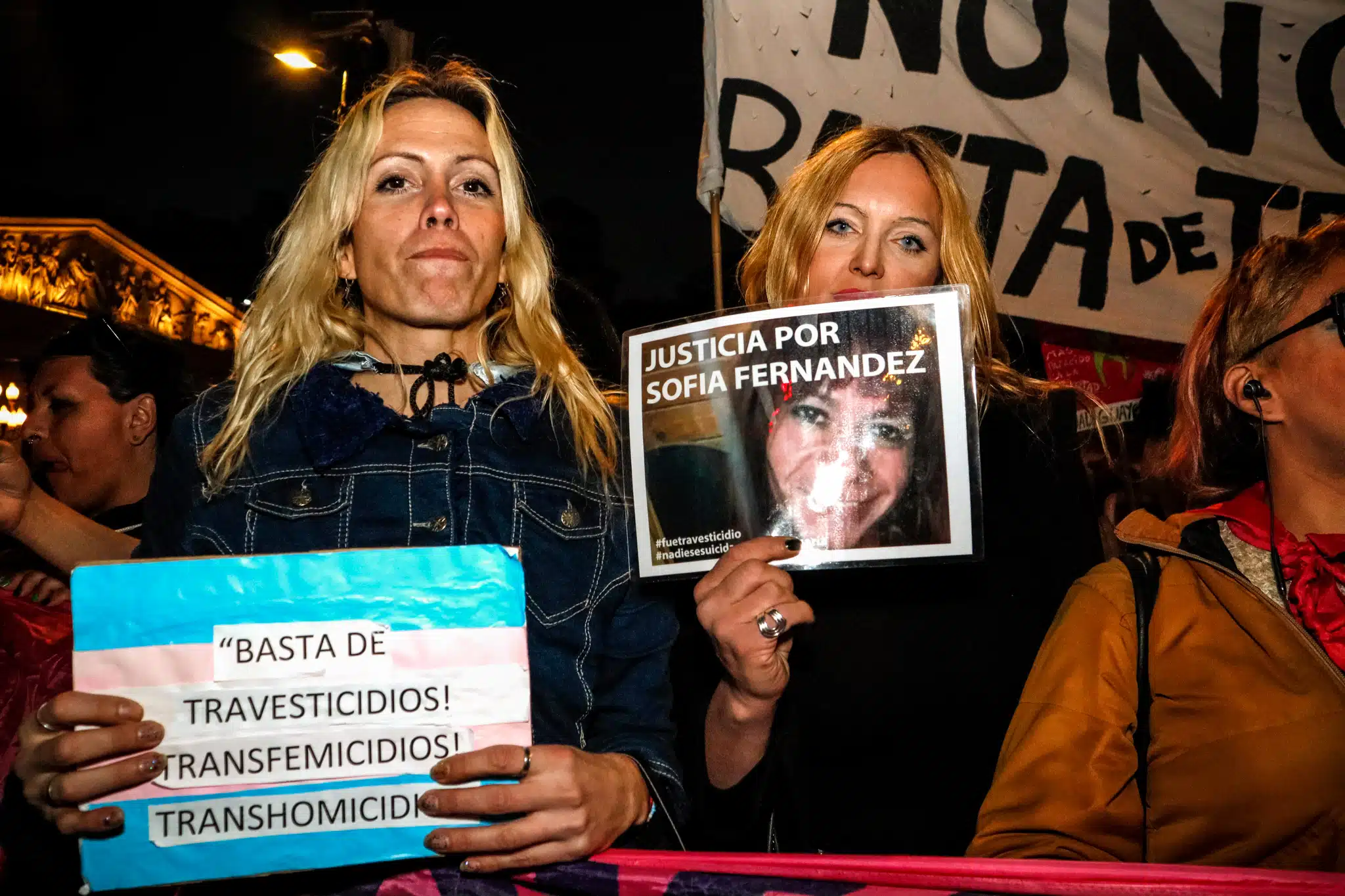
Protester at the Plaza de Mayo in Buenos Aires, Argentina holding a placard with the words: "Stop the Travesticides! Transfemicides! Transhomicides!"

Transfemicide or transfeminicide is defined as the killing of a trans woman motivated by transphobic, misogynistic and transmisogynistic hatred that has its origins in cissexist cultural and political norms. The term is most often used as a subset of femicide, a theoretical and legal concept describing the murder of women and girls by men on the basis of sexist beliefs and norms. Journalists and academics alike believe the prevalence of transfemicide to be vastly underreported. Journalists Emma Landeros and Joel Aguirre argue that, as hate crimes, transfemicides constitute a 'silent epidemic' in Mexico, with many deaths receiving little or no media coverage.

The Trans Murder Monitoring project, run by Transgender Europe (TGEU), recorded 281 reported murders of trans and gender-diverse people between 1 October 2024 and 30 September 2025. TGEU classed 90% of them as feminicides, meaning the victims were trans women or transfeminine people. Sex workers were the most targeted occupational group, at 34%. Latin America and the Caribbean accounted for 68% of the murders, and Brazil for 30%, the most of any country for the 18th year in a row. TGEU says the true total is probably much higher, because many murders are misreported or left out.

== Historical usage ==
The concept of femicide, understood as the intentional killing of a woman by a man motivated by misogynistic hatred, was established by Diana Russell and Jane Caputi and later popularized in Latin America by Marcela Lagarde. Transfemicide, however, is a term generally attributed to transfeminist activists in Latin America, who sought to describe the heightened structural violence trans women in the region face by expanding the concept of femicide. Academic and assistant professor of gender and postcolonial studies Ana Maria Miranda Mora argues that legislation against femicide, in applying strict interpretations of gender-based violence, has at the same time reproduced violence by making the experiences of trans women and queer cisgender women invisible.

=== Legal views ===
The Human Rights Watch, in their report on violence against LGBT people in El Salvador, Guatemala, and Honduras, note that Central American governments have long excluded transgender women from preexisting legal structures meant to prosecute femicides. Guatemalan officials have justified this by stating that transgender women are not "biological women" in their eyes and therefore their murders are not covered by such laws.

In the case of Vicky Hernández v Honduras, tried before Inter-American Court of Human Rights (IACHR), the Robert F. Kennedy Human Rights organization and Red Lésbica Cattrachas successfully argued that the government of Honduras held responsibility for the death of trans activist and sex worker Vicky Hernández. The result of the case was seen as a landmark ruling establishing a powerful precedent for the defense of transgender women and LGBT Latin Americans broadly.

== By region ==
=== North America ===
==== United States ====
On December 24, 2024, Chicago Mayor Brandon Johnson signed an executive order establishing a "Transfemicide Working Group", specifically mentioning Black trans women and the heightened discrimination and violence they face. In Puerto Rico, the 2020 murder of Neulisa Luciano Ruiz, also known as Alexa, sparked outrage among Puerto Rican activists. They saw the police and media misgendering Neulisa as downplaying the transphobic nature of the killing. In response to media coverage of Nuelisa's killing, Puerto Rican rapper Bad Bunny wore a shirt with the words "They killed Alexa, not a man in a skirt" during a performance on The Tonight Show Starring Jimmy Fallon.

==== Mexico ====
In Mexico, only five states recognize transfemicide as a distinct legal category, with Nayarit being the earliest to implement such a law on March 1, 2024. In 2024, activists successfully pushed the Mexico City legislature to legally recognize transfemicides after the 2016 murder of Paola Buenrostro, a trans sex worker. Known as the "Paola Buenrostro law", the legislation makes the killing of a transgender woman a crime punishable by up to 70 years in prison.

Mexico has one of the highest rates of transfemicides in the world. Letra Ese, an organization tracking hate crimes, reported 55 transfemicides in 2024, making Mexico one of the deadliest countries in the world for transgender women.

=== South America ===
==== Argentina ====
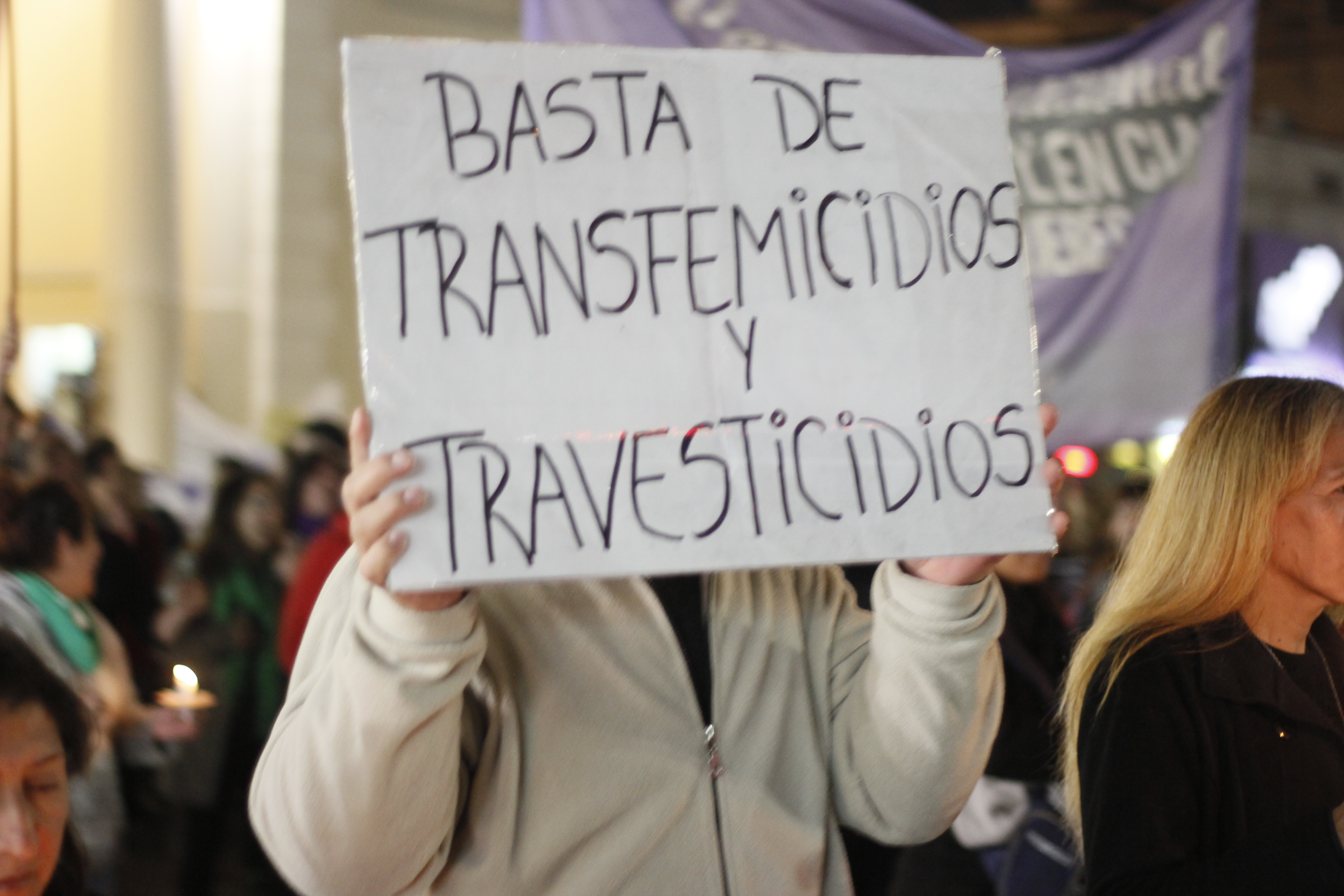
Signage saying "Stop with the transfemicides and travesticides!" at a 2018 protest in response to the transfemicide of Cynthia Moreira in Tucumán, Argentina.

In October 2017, Azul Montoro, an Argentinian sex worker, was murdered in the city of Córdoba. In the days after her death, the Asociación de Travestis, Transexuales y Transgéneros de Argentina (Association of Travestis, Transsexuals, and Transgenders of Argentina) or ATTTA, demanded justice for Azul and mobilized protests and candlelight vigils. The perpetrator was eventually found guilty under the nation's femicide law, a historic first for Argentina.

==== Colombia ====
In Colombia, cases of transfemicide are covered under section 104A: "Feminicidio" (Femicide) of the Colombian legal code. Specifically, the law states that killings motivated by a [trans] woman's gender-identity, along with the circumstances of the victim's relationship to the perpetrator, constitute femicide. In 2023, a total of 41 transgender women were killed, many as a result of what are referred to as "social cleansing" campaigns taken on by ultraconservative armed groups in Colombia who seek to terrorize LGBTQ Colombians. Despite relatively progressive policies regarding gender and sexual minorities, and the existence of the "Feminicidio" Law, many transfemicides continue to go unpunished.

== Activism ==
=== Ni Una Menos (Not One Less) ===
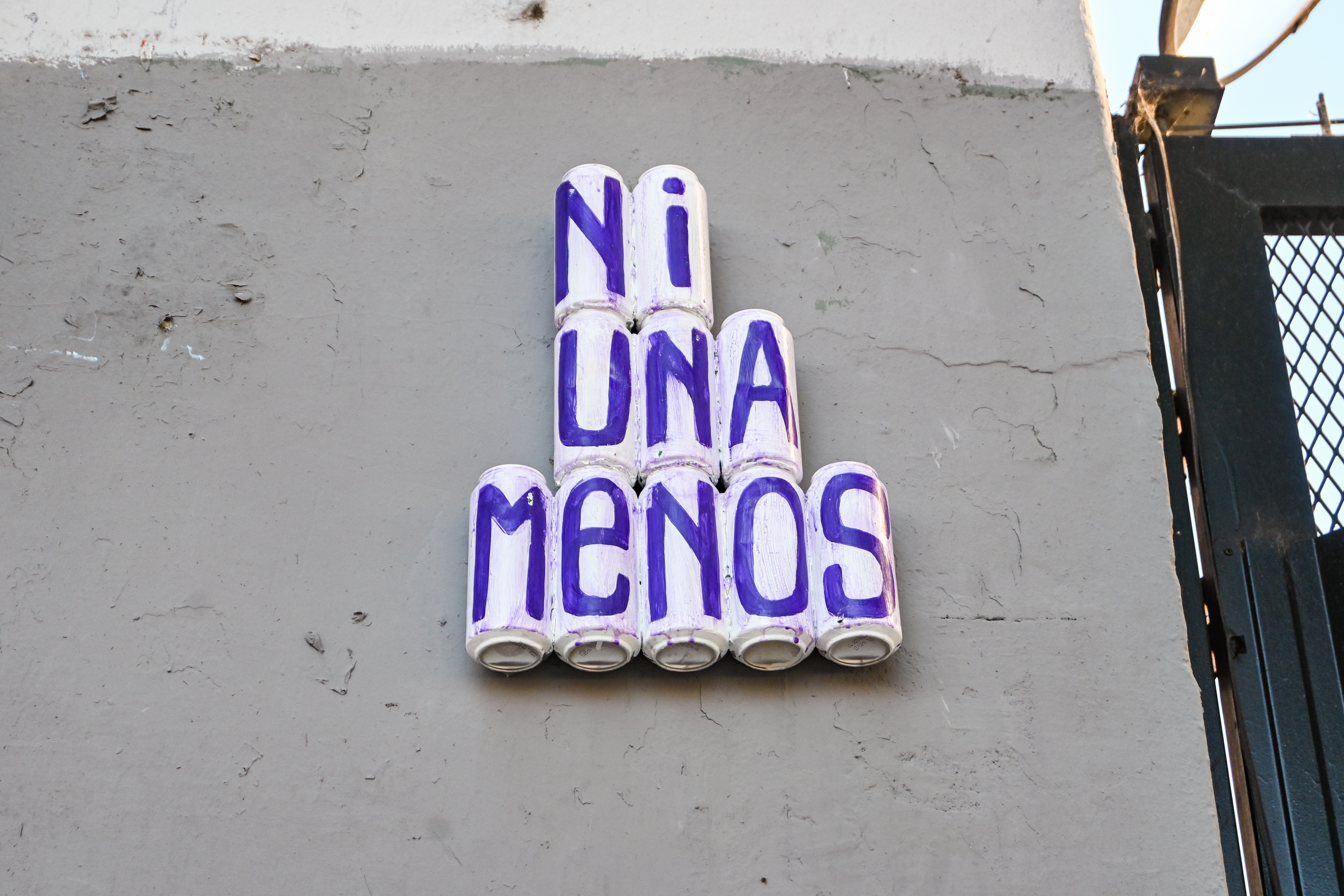
A set of cans forming the words "Ni una menos" (Not one less) in Argentina.

Ni Una Menos is a Latin American feminist movement that started in Argentina as a rallying slogan against femicide and misogynistic violence. Starting as a movement decrying violence against women in general, transgender activists have adopted it to protest against transfemicides. Peruvian activist group Féminas rallied around the slogan "Ni Una Trans Menos" (Not One Trans [Woman] Less) to protest a lack of protections against transphobic violence. In a New York Times interview, feminist theorist and philosopher Judith Butler argues that the Ni Una Menos movement is a broadly inclusive movement in Latin America made up of a diverse group of women, both cisgender and transgender, seeking an end to the killings of people "who are feminized or regarded as feminine".

=== Transgender Day of Remembrance (TDoR) ===
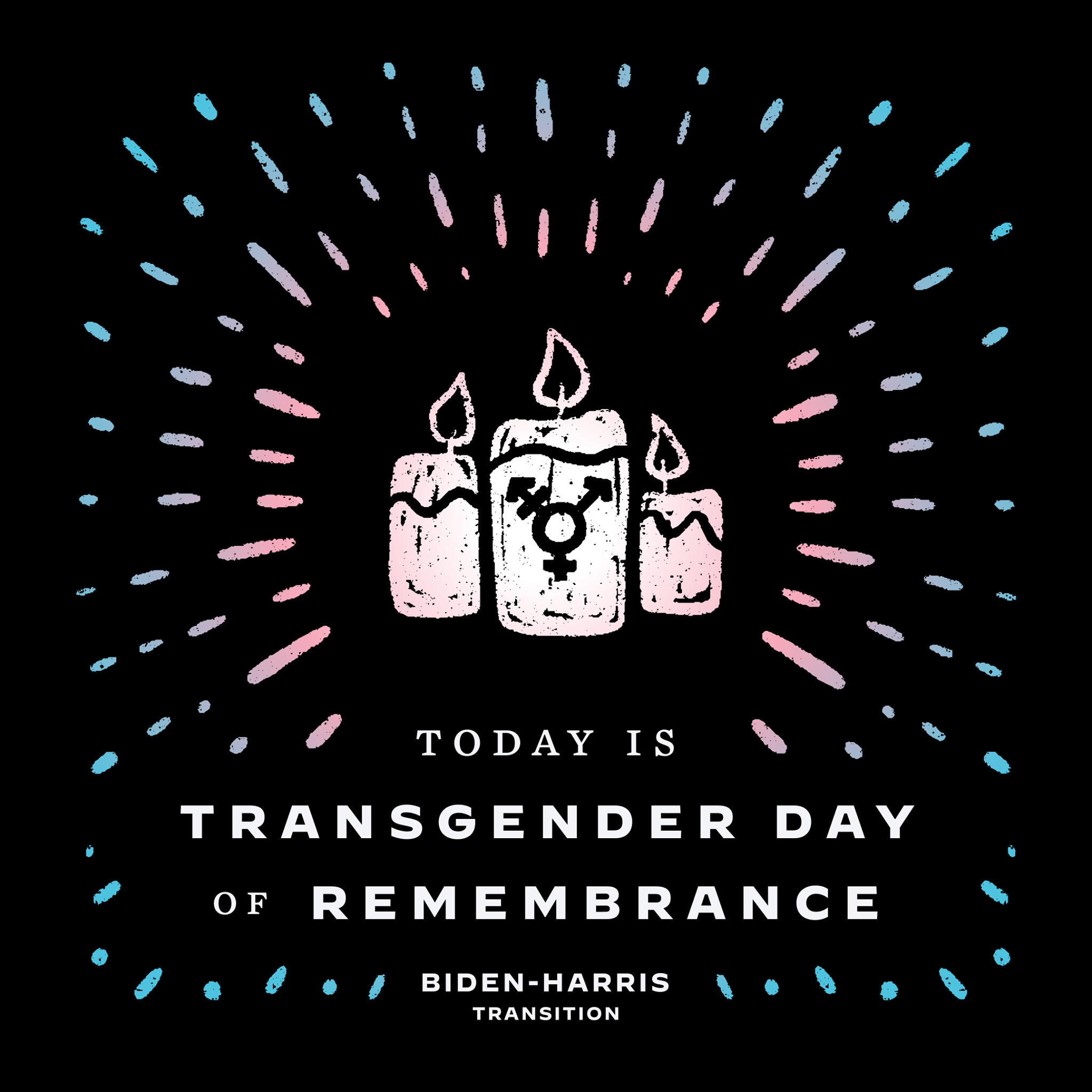
Biden-Harris team in 2020 commemorating Trans Day of Remembrance

Transgender Day of Remembrance (TDoR) is a day of observation celebrated yearly on November 20th memorializing the deaths of transgender people as a result of transphobia. The tradition was started by a small group of transgender people in 1999 who wanted to honor the life of their friend, Rita Hester, who was killed in 1998. In the United States, the Joe Biden administration released yearly press memos commemorating TDoR. The administration's November 20, 2023 release states that, of the 26 transgender Americans killed that year, "the majority of those targeted [were transgender] women of color".

== See also ==
- Violence against transgender people
- Trans Murder Monitoring
- Femicide in Latin America
- Operation Tarantula
