= She Doesn't Want to Sleep Alone =

2012 film

- Theatrical release poster
- Directed by: Natalia Beristáin
- Written by: Natalia Beristáin; Gabriela Vidal
- Produced by: Rodrigo Herranz; Rafael Ley; Abril Schmucler
- Starring: Mariana Gajá; Adriana Roel; Leonardo Ortizgris
- Cinematography: Dariela Ludlow
- Edited by: Miguel Schverdfinger
- Music by: Pedro de Tavira
- Distributed by: Canana Presenta
- Release dates: 3 September 2012 (FICM); 5 July 2013 (Mexico)
- Running time: 83 minutes
- Country: Mexico
- Language: Spanish

She Doesn't Want to Sleep Alone (Spanish: No quiero dormir sola) is a 2012 Mexican drama written and directed by Natalia Beristáin. It premiered at the 69th edition of the Venice Film Festival, in the Critics' Week sidebar.

== Plot ==
Amanda is a lonely young woman who cannot sleep alone and spends the nights with several lovers. Suddenly, she is forced to take care of Dolores, her alcoholic grandmother, who used to be an actress and now lives on memories of her glory days.

== Cast ==
- Mariana Gajá as Amanda
- Adriana Roel as Dolores
- Leonardo Ortizgris as Pablo
- Arturo Beristáin as Amanda's father

== Awards and nominations ==
She Doesn't Want to Sleep Alone was nominated to five Ariel Awards, winning one: Best Actress for Adriana Roel.

Year	Award	Recipient(s)	Result
2014	Best Picture	She Doesn't Want to Sleep Alone	Nominated
2014	Best Actress	Adriana Roel	Won
2014	Best Supporting Actress	Mariana Gajá	Nominated
2014	Best Original Screenplay	Gabriela Vidal and Natalia Beristáin	Nominated
2014	Best First Feature Film	Natalia Beristáin	Nominated
