= Adolfo (film) =

2023 film

- Theatrical release poster
- Directed by: Sofía Auza
- Screenplay by: Sofía Auza
- Produced by: Camila Jiménez; Silvana Aguirre; Alejandro Durán
- Starring: Juan Daniel García Treviño; Rocío de la Mañana
- Cinematography: Leo Calzoni
- Production company: The Immigrant
- Distributed by: Fremantle
- Release dates: 18 February 2023 (Berlinale); 28 May 2024 (Mexico City)
- Running time: 69 minutes
- Countries: Mexico; United States
- Language: Spanish

Adolfo is a 2023 coming-of-age drama film written and directed by Sofía Auza in her directorial debut. Starring Juan Daniel García Treviño and Rocío de la Mañana.

== Premise ==
On her way out of rehab treatment, while dressed as Amelia Earhart, Momo (de la Mañana) encounters Hugo (García Treviño), who is traveling to his father's funeral. The pair spend the night trying to find a new environment for Adolfo, Hugo's cactus.

== Cast ==
- Juan Daniel García Treviño as Hugo
- Rocío de la Mañana as Momo

== Release ==
Adolfo premiered in the Generation 14plus section of the 73rd Berlin International Film Festival, where it was awarded the Crystal Bear for the Best Film by the youth jury. The film was later awarded the Bronze Horse for Best Film in the 11–14-year-old category at the Stockholm Film Festival Junior and screened at the Seattle International Film Festival, the Huelva Ibero-American Film Festival. At the Guadalajara International Film Festival in June 2023, Rocío de la Mañana was recognized with the Mezcal Award for Best Actress.

The film debuted in Mexico City on 27 May 2024, and is scheduled to screen at Cinemex theaters across Mexico beginning on 6 June.

== Reception ==
=== Accolades ===
Award	Ceremony date	Category	Recipient(s)	Result	Ref.
Berlin International Film Festival	26 February 2023	Crystal Bear for Best Film	Adolfo	Won	
Stockholm Film Festival Junior	3 April 2023	Bronze Horse for Best Film (11–14 y/o)	Adolfo	Won	
Seattle International Film Festival	21 May 2023	Ibero-American Competition	Adolfo	Nominated	
Guadalajara International Film Festival	9 June 2023	Mezcal Award for Best Actress	Rocío de la Mañana	Won	
Huelva Ibero-American Film Festival	18 November 2023	Best Film	Adolfo	Nominated	
Ariel Award	7 September 2024	Best First Work	Adolfo	Nominated	
Ariel Award	7 September 2024	Best Breakthrough Performance	Rocío de la Mañana	Nominated	
