= Mariana Gajá =

Mexican actress (born 1976)

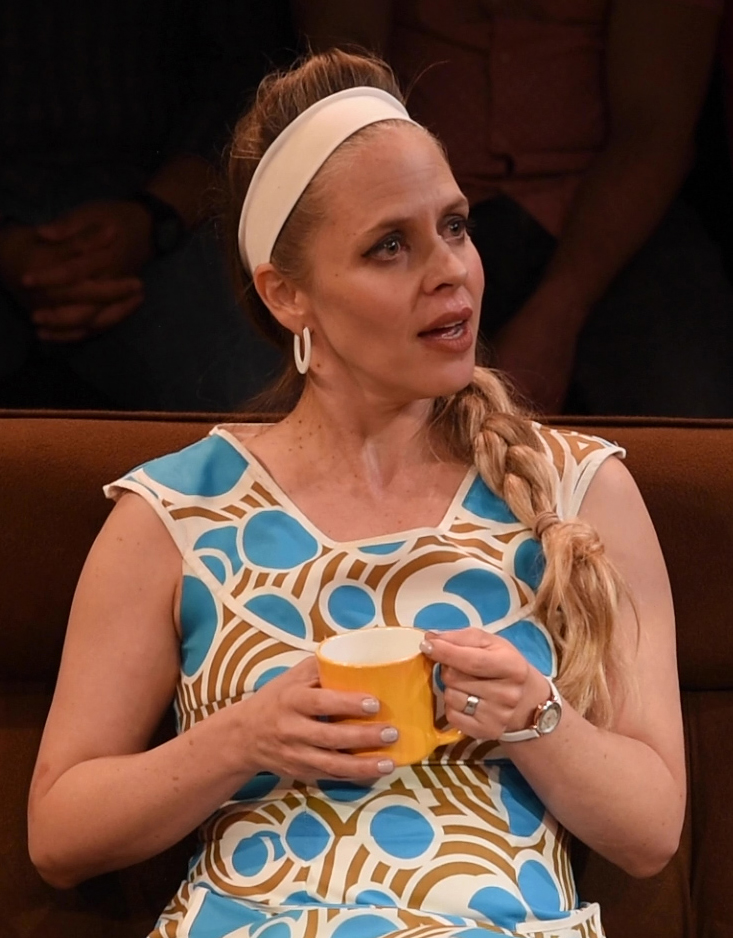
- Gajá in 2022
- Born: 3 April 1976 (age 50); Mexico City, Mexico
- Education: Centro Universitario de Teatro
- Occupation: Actress
- Years active: 1982–present

Mariana Gajá Cover (born 3 April 1976) is a Mexican television, film and stage actress.

== Career ==
Gajá was born in Mexico City on 3 April 1976 and started her career in 1982 appearing in the telenovela Vanessa, three years later, she appeared in Esperándote. Gajá appeared in short film during the 1990s and graduated from the Centro Universitario de Teatro, the theater school of the National Autonomous University of Mexico in 2000. In 2003, Gajá made her feature film debut in Sin ton ni Sonia.

Gajá appeared in popular TV series such as Capadocia and Soy tu fan in the early 2010s. In 2010, Gajá joined the National Theatre Company of Mexico, becoming part of the recurrent cast of the company.

In 2014, at the 56th Ariel Awards, Gajá was nominated for the Ariel Award for Best Supporting Actress for his performance in She Doesn't Want to Sleep Alone.

== Selected filmography ==
=== Film ===
Year	Title	Roles	Notes
2003	Sin ton ni Sonia	Sonia	
2012	She Doesn't Want to Sleep Alone	Amanda	Nominated—Ariel Award for Best Supporting Actress
2017	Cuernavaca	Mariana	

=== Television ===
Year	Title	Roles	Notes
1982	Vanessa	Vanessa's daughter	3 episodes
1985	Esperándote	Anita	3 episodes
2008–2010	Capadocia	Clara Almazán	8 episodes
2010–2011	Soy tu fan	Carolina	8 episodes
2013	Sr. Ávila	Mariana	1 episode
2013	El Chapo	La Licenciada	2 episodes
2020	El Candidato	Reporter	1 episode
2020	Here on Earth	Eugenia Landa	1 episode
2020	La negociadora	Milagros	12 episodes
