= Trigal =

- Theatrical release poster
- Directed by: Anabel Caso
- Written by: Anabel Caso
- Produced by: Paula Astorga; Francisco Torregrosa; Fredy Garza Wollenstein
- Starring: Emilia Berjón Ramírez; Abril Michel; Alberto Guerra
- Cinematography: Julio Llorente
- Music by: Camilo Froideval
- Production company: Home Films
- Distributed by: Nueva Era Films
- Release dates: October 25, 2022 (FICM); April 20, 2023 (Mexico)
- Running time: 115 minutes
- Country: Mexico
- Language: Spanish

Trigal (lit. 'Wheat field') is a 2022 Mexican drama film written and directed by Anabel Caso in her directorial debut. Starring Emilia Berjón Ramírez, Abril Michel and Alberto Guerra. It is about the sexual awakening in female puberty.

So far, the film has been nominated in the Best Feature Film category at the Morelia International Film Festival and won 2 Ariel Awards for Best Supporting Actress for Úrsula Pruneda and Best Breakthrough Performance for Emilia Berjón, in addition to having a nomination for Best First Work.

== Synopsis ==
Sofía, a 13-year-old girl, during her vacation is sent to a country house in Sonora where her 15-year-old cousin Cristina is waiting for her. On those hot days of leisure and walks among the wheat fields, both will be submerged in a love triangle with a day laborer twenty years older, J.C. and whose end, not without pain, will mark the passage from puberty to adolescence for both of them.

== Cast ==
The actors participating in this film are:

- Emilia Berjón Ramírez as Sofia
- Abril Michel as Cristina
- Alberto Guerra as J.C.
- Nicolasa Ortíz Monasterio as Silvia
- Úrsula Pruneda as Susi
- Patricia Ortiz as Carmen
- Gerardo Trejo Luna
- Memo Villegas

== Production ==
=== Script ===
The original idea for Trigal was born 10 years ago, taking as inspiration personal memories that the director had in her life in the countryside with her grandparents and cousins in Argentina.

=== Filming ===
Principal photography began in March 2020 in Hermosillo, Mexico. However, after 2 weeks of filming, the recordings were paralyzed due to the COVID-19 pandemic. In the end, the recordings resumed on August 10, 2020, lasting 2 weeks.

== Release ==
It had its world premiere on October 25, 2022, at the Morelia International Film Festival. It was commercially released on April 20, 2023, in Mexican theaters.

== Accolades ==
Year	Award / Festival	Category	Recipient	Result	Ref.
2022	Morelia International Film Festival	Best Feature Film	Trigal	Nominated	
2023	Ariel Awards	Best Supporting Actress	Nicolasa Ortiz Monasterio	Nominated	
2023	Ariel Awards	Best Supporting Actress	Úrsula Pruneda	Won	
2023	Ariel Awards	Best Breakthrough Performance	Emilia Berjón	Won	
2023	Ariel Awards	Best First Work	Trigal	Nominated	
