= Noise (2022 film) =

- Netflix release poster
- Directed by: Natalia Beristáin
- Written by: Natalia Beristain; Diego Enrique Osorno; Alo Valenzuela Escobedo
- Produced by: Maria Ayub; Karla Badillo; Maria Jose Cordova; Rafael Ley; Gabriela Maldonado
- Starring: Julieta Egurrola
- Cinematography: Dariela Ludlow
- Edited by: Miguel Schverdfinger
- Music by: Pablo Chemor
- Production companies: Woo Films; Agencia Bengala
- Distributed by: Netflix
- Release dates: September 2022 (Zinemaldia); 13 October 2022 (Argentina); 5 January 2023 (Mexico)
- Running time: 104 minutes
- Countries: Mexico; Argentina
- Language: Spanish

Noise (Spanish: Ruido) is a 2022 Mexican-Argentine drama film directed by Natalia Beristáin and written by Beristáin, Diego Enrique Osorno & Alo Valenzuela Escobedo. Starring Julieta Egurrola. It won the Spanish Cooperation Award at the San Sebastián International Film Festival.

== Synopsis ==
Nine months ago Ger disappeared. As a last testimony, there is a video where she tells her mother that she is having an incredible vacation. Later it was learned that she entered a bar, then her trail was lost. Since then, her mother, Julia, has been looking for her.

== Cast ==
The actors participating in this film are:

- Julieta Egurrola as Julia
- Gabriela Núñez as Adriana
- Nicolasa Ortiz-Monasterio as Ger
- Brenda Yañez as Paola
- Sofía Correa as Emilia
- Mauricio Calderón as Cassandra's Secretary
- Erick Israel Consuelo as Assistant Prosecutor
- Teresa Ruiz as Abril Escobedo
- Kenya Cuevas as América
- Jimena González as Liz
- Adrián Vázquez as Fiscal Rodríguez
- Mariana Giménez as Commander
- Mariana Villegas as Girl from the balcony Okupa
- Arturo Beristáin as Arturo
- Pedro de Tavira Egurrola as Pedro
- Mónica del Carmen as Cassandra
- Alphonso Escobedo as Hotel man

== Production ==
Principal photography began on July 27, 2021, in Rioverde, San Luis Potosí amid the COVID-19 pandemic.

== Release ==
Noise had its international premiere in September 2022 at the 70th San Sebastián International Film Festival, to later be released on October 13 of the same year in Argentine cinemas. It had a limited theatrical release on January 5, 2023, in Mexican theaters, to then be released worldwide on January 11, 2023, on Netflix.

== Reception ==
=== Critical reception ===
On the review aggregator website Rotten Tomatoes, 100% of 11 critics' reviews are positive, with an average rating of 7.6/10.

Paula Vázquez Prieto from La Nación highlights the acting work of Julieta Egurrola and her ability to embody the perfect emotions for her character. She also highlights the script work that the film has and how it plunges you into a true nightmare. John Serba from Decider also praised Julieta Egurrola's performance as a key player in making this drama so compelling and powerful yet so balanced between contextual and emotional fodder.

=== Accolades ===
Year	Award	Category	Recipient	Result	Ref.
2022	San Sebastián International Film Festival	Spanish Cooperation Award	Natalia Beristáin	Won	
2022	San Sebastián International Film Festival	Horizons Award	Natalia Beristáin	Nominated	
2022	Chicago International Film Festival	Gold Hugo - International Feature Film	Natalia Beristáin	Nominated	
2022	Morelia International Film Festival	Best Feature Film	Natalia Beristáin	Nominated	
2023	Ariel Awards	Best Director	Natalia Beristáin	Nominated	
2023	Ariel Awards	Best Actress	Julieta Egurrola	Nominated	
2023	Ariel Awards	Best Cinematography	Dariela Ludlow	Nominated	
2023	Ariel Awards	Best Editing	Miguel Schverdfinger	Nominated	
