= Karem the Possession =

2021 Mexican horror film

- Spanish: Karem, la posesión
- Directed by: Henry Bedwell
- Written by: Henry Bedwell
- Produced by: Rigoberto Castañeda
- Starring: Raquel Rodriguez; Daniel Martinez; Dominika Paleta
- Cinematography: Junichiro Hayashi
- Edited by: Andres Martinez Rios
- Music by: Israel García
- Distributed by: VideoCine
- Release date: December 30, 2021
- Running time: 86 minutes
- Country: Mexico
- Language: Spanish

Karem the Possession (Spanish: Karem, la posesión) is a 2021 Mexican supernatural horror film directed by Henry Bedwell and produced by Rigoberto Castañeda and his company Videocine. In the film plot, Karem, the youngest member of an atheist family is possessed by a dangerous demon who grants her dreadful abilities. Based loosely on a real-life case of demonic possession, initially scheduled for a 2020 premiere date and after being in production for six years. The movie was eventually released on December 30, 2021, in Mexico, where it grossed US$792,795 but was criticized by the critics because of its direction, plot and acting.

== Plot ==
In 1984 in the pursuit of a work opportunity, the Briseño, an atheist family, moves from the United States to Durango, Mexico, to their new home, a manor believed haunted; after the mysterious death of the previous owners. Karem, the youngest daughter, hears mutters from the basement, but she only finds a toy. The next day Karem is bullied by her classmates because of her status as the new girl in school and her atheist philosophy. Isolated in her room without telling her parents of her experience, Karem makes contact through her diary with an invisible entity who presents himself as Naro. He wants to befriend her, exposing his knowledge of her bullies and offering his help. He grants her psych abilities from that day Karem can use a form of telekinesis.

As a side effect of her new powers, Karem's personality transitions from being shy and self-restrained to explosive and aggressive, which causes her teacher Clarissa to ground her when she yells at her in class. That day the Briseño are visited by Father Miguel, a priest who learns something odd about them after talking with Karem and recalls the incident with the previous family who lived there. His investigation of the manor leads him to unravel Naro's existence, a dreadful demon who granted abilities to the youngest child of another family and caused the death of everyone when he was confronted by the rest of the family. Miguel reports to his superior in order of helping the family as soon as possible due to Abraham, the family patriarch refusing to believe his warnings even though his wife Mariana and the rest of his children try to convince him something is not right about their home.

After Fabiola, one of Karem's bullies gets sick and regurgitates blood with paper, the rest of her classmates Elizabeth and Adriana confront Karem accusing her of Fabiola's state. Karem in response attacks and kills them with help of her powers and she also injures Clarissa when she enters the classroom trying to help the girls. The murders suspend the classes, Karem then persuades her eldest sister Laura of taking her with Clarissa to the hospital to "visit her". However, as Clarissa is still in intensive care, Karem and Laura visit Fabiola instead. Once both girls are left alone, a weak Fabiola tries to apologize to Karem but she refuses to listen and finishes her off posing her death as an unexpected medical complication.

That night Laura is possessed by Karem, who manipulates her actions to make her kill Clarissa when she smothers her with a pillow at the hospital. Due to Laura being free of the possession as soon as Clarissa dies, Laura is arrested for the murder of the teacher. Hearing his sister was arrested, Karem reproaches Naro for the consequences of her actions and tries to cut ties with him, but he refuses and takes over her and her brother Eduardo's bodies. On his way to the manor, both Abraham and Mariana are approached by Miguel who offers their help with Karem. Inside the manor, they witness supernatural phenomena like poltergeists, and Naro himself manifests as a boy carbonized. Mariana reaches out to Karem in her room where the girl fully controlled by Naro kill her mother. Eventually, a Cardinal with other priests arrives at the manor for helping the family. A possessed Eduardo attacks them with demonic powers while the cardinal tries to exorcism Naro out of his body which causes the boy's death when the demon tears off his arms in front of an impotent Abraham. Naro then takes control over both Mariana and Abraham to force them to attack the priest and Miguel which causes the death of the last two as the cardinal exorcism out Naro from Mariana's corpse. With just the cardinal left alive in the manor, Karem attacks him as he performs an exorcism for saving her and stabs her in the stomach during the ritual. The church covers the incident with the Briseño, takes Karem into custody, and locks away her diary inside a vault. Sometime later, Laura is contacted in her cell by Naro as she smiles reading his message.

In a mid-credits scene Karem is taken by a nun to a room where she is lobotomized, presumably to prevent her from being used by Naro and her psych abilities again.

At the end of the credits, what appears to be the last photograph of the real Briseño family appears. It's accompanied by a Latin phrase that the real Karem supposedly used to say when she was possessed: "Quia non refert quid vis ut nunc. nonne tu es hinc. Hinc illum sicut me", which means "Because it doesn't matter what you want now. Aren't you from here? That's why he likes me".

According to the real Briseño family case (that inspired the film), all the members of the family (including the real possessed girl Karem) were inexplicably found dead inside their house in 1984.

== Cast ==
- Daniel Martinez as Abraham Briseño
- Dominika Paleta as Mariana Briseño
- Raquel Rodriguez as Karem Briseño
- Miranda Kay as Laura Briseño
- Gregorio Urquijo as Eduardo Briseño

== Production ==
The film is a co-production of L'maneto Films with Videocine from Rigoberto Castañeda. Originally actress Miranda Kay was cast for the role of eponymous Karem Briseño, however as the film took around 6 years to be made, she was eventually cast as the eldest daughter instead. Photography director Junichiro Hayashi took the job after film director Henry Bedwell send him the script and traveled to Mexico for the shooting stage.

Principal photography began in 2019 on Durango, Mexico, and it is based on a real-life case of demonic possession of Mexico, Durango. However Bedwell only used the case as an inspiration for the plot of the film that is mainly fictitious. Some scenes were filmed in real locations of Durango like Velatorio "El Sabino", Elementary School Guadalupe Victoria and Museum art Guillermo Ceniceros. Film director felt Durango state allowed the film crew to work freely due the state is used for filming projects.

== Distribution ==
The film premiere was held at Durango on December 7, 2021 during film festival "Feratum 2021". About a month before its scheduled premiere date on December 30. As most of the films made during 2019-2020 season on Mexico, the film was delayed from his original 2020 release date. The official date was chosen to be in December for the movie to be released in 2021.

== Reception ==
=== Box office ===
Box Office Mojo estimates that on its opening week the movie earned $311,748 from December 30 to January 2. Additionally, for its second week of the exhibition, it gained $647,043. Most of the box office stability was compromised mainly because of the movie's competition during its run in Mexico, as a result, the movie's total gross was $792,795.

=== Critical response ===
Mishel Luna from Tomatazos dubbed the movie as predictable and not scary due to unrealistic sequences and lack of innovations, he concludes: "Karem, la posesión could have been a great movie, but it lacked attention on narrative details and investigation in order to exploit a real story and as harsh as it was the real family from Durango." Writing for Spoiler Luis Leonardo Suarez anointed the movie as "mediocre" because of the presence of exorcism and possession movies cliches, and he also criticized the actors' performances such as the lead actress. Suarez lauded Junichiro Hayashi role as principal photography director as the only redeemable movie quality. Similarly, AJ Navarro from "Cronica Escenario" praised the film photography but was more critical about the rest of the film, like the acting and special effects. He was also vocal about the plot consistency and the use of clichés from exorcism and demonic possession films.
