= Home Is Somewhere Else =

2022 Mexican-American animated documentary film

- Film poster
- Directed by: Carlos Hagerman; Jorge Villalobos
- Written by: Carlos Hagerman; Jorge Villalobos
- Produced by: Carlos Hagerman; Guillermo Rendón; Jorge Villalobos
- Starring: Jasmine; Evelyn & Elizabeth; José Eduardo Aguilar "El Deportee"
- Edited by: Inger Díaz Barriga; Alejandra Ruvalcaba; Martha Uc
- Music by: Javier Álvarez
- Production companies: Brinca Animation Studio; Shine Global
- Distributed by: Artegios distribución
- Release dates: June 15, 2022 (Annecy); June 17, 2022 (Guadalajara); September 26, 2022 (AFI); May 4, 2023 (Mexico)
- Running time: 87 minutes
- Countries: Mexico; United States
- Languages: Spanish; English

Home Is Somewhere Else is a 2022 Mexican-American adult animated documentary film written and directed by Carlos Hagerman & Jorge Villalobos (in his directorial debut). It tells three stories of migrant families who share their fears, hopes, and emotions about what it means to live undocumented in the United States.

== Synopsis ==
It tells 3 independent stories about undocumented immigrants in the United States. The first story is about Jasmine, who lives in fear that her parents will be deported; the second is about the sisters Evelyn (US citizen) and Elizabeth (undocumented immigrant) who live apart due to their different immigration statuses; and the last one tells the story of José Eduardo Aguilar "El Deportee" who was deported to Mexico at the age of 23 and since then became an activist and defender of the Mexican deportees.

== Release ==
Home Is Somewhere Else had its international premiere on June 15, 2022, at the 41st Annecy International Animated Film Festival. It had its premiere in Mexican territory on June 17, 2022, at the 37th Guadalajara International Film Festival. Then, it premiered on September 26, 2022, at the AFI Latin American Film Festival and 4 days later at the GuadaLAjara Film Festival, Los Angeles. It was commercially released on May 4, 2023 in Mexican theaters.

== Reception ==
=== Critical reception ===
Carlos Aguilar from Cartoon Brew wrote: "Hagerman and Villalobos succeed at portraying each person beyond their status, or lack thereof. The film finds moments of joy to highlight and endearing passages of everyday victories that enrich our perception of its characters. These are not extraordinarily talented individuals or those who have survived the most harrowing experiences, but average people who, as much as anybody else, deserve peace of mind and opportunities to live freely." Alejandro Alemán from El Universal wrote: "What makes this documentary new is its way of narrating, with animations in three different styles, the first story stands out... The result is absolutely beautiful, not only because of the inevitable emotion of each story but also because of the animations. and the empathy that this beautiful documentary spreads."

=== Accolades ===
Year	Award / Festival	Category	Recipient	Result	Ref.
2022	Annecy International Animated Film Festival	Contrechamp Award	Carlos Hagerman & Jorge Villalobos	Nominated	
2022	Guadalajara International Film Festival	Best International Animated Film	Carlos Hagerman & Jorge Villalobos	Nominated	
2022	DocsDF, International Documentary Film Festival of Mexico City	"Made in Mexico" Award	Carlos Hagerman & Jorge Villalobos	Won	
2022	Havana Film Festival	Animation Jury Special Award	Carlos Hagerman & Jorge Villalobos	Won	
2022	Morelia International Film Festival	Best Documentary Feature Film	Carlos Hagerman & Jorge Villalobos	Nominated	
2022	International Documentary Film Festival Amsterdam	Best Youth Film +14	Carlos Hagerman & Jorge Villalobos	Won	
2022	Zanate Mexican Documentary Film Festival	Grand Prix Zanate - Honorable Mention	Carlos Hagerman & Jorge Villalobos	Won	
2022	Montclair Film Festival	New Jersey Films Competition	Carlos Hagerman & Jorge Villalobos	Won	
2023	San Diego Latino Film Festival	Documentary Audience Award	Carlos Hagerman, Jorge Villalobos & Mariana Marín	Won	
2023	Cleveland International Film Festival	Greg Gund Memorial Standing Up Award	Carlos Hagerman & Jorge Villalobos	Nominated	
2023	Ariel Awards	Best Documentary Feature	Carlos Hagerman & Jorge Villalobos	Nominated	
2023	Ariel Awards	Best Animated Feature Film	Carlos Hagerman & Jorge Villalobos	Won	
2024	Platino Awards	Best Animated Film	Carlos Hagerman & Jorge Villalobos	Nominated	
