= The Realm of God =

- Berlinale release poster
- Directed by: Claudia Sainte–Luce
- Written by: Claudia Sainte–Luce
- Produced by: Carlos Correa; Sergio Diaz; Christian Kregel
- Starring: Diego Armando Lara Lagunes; Margarita Guevara González; Lizbeth Gabriela Nolasco
- Production companies: Godius Film; Gravedad Cero Films; Jaqueca Films
- Release dates: February 15, 2022 (Berlinale); June 11, 2022 (FICG)
- Running time: 73 minutes
- Country: Mexico
- Language: Spanish

The Realm of God (Spanish: El reino de Dios) is a 2022 Mexican drama film written and directed by Claudia Sainte–Luce. Starring Diego Armando Lara Lagunes, Margarita Guevara González and Lizbeth Gabriela Nolasco.

== Synopsis ==
Neimar is an eight-year-old boy who leads a quiet life taking care of horses, working and helping his mother while he waits for his first communion where he hopes to meet God. As he prepares to receive the sacrament, he loses faith because of his surroundings.

== Cast ==
The actors participating in this film are:

- Diego Armando Lara Lagunes as Neimar
- Margarita Guevara González as Neimar's grandmother
- Lizbeth Nolasco Hernández as Neymar's mom
- Mariano Chávez Chávez as Neimar's father
- Diógenes Ivan Delfín Elvira as Prophet
- Alfredo Pantoja Gallego as Kardashian Owner
- Michelle Guevara González as Demi
- Oswaldo Molina Arzola as Demi's dad
- Yair Castro as Catechist
- Cipriana Castro Chávez as Chiquilin Owner
- Jorge Escobedo Kaliman as Priest

== Production ==
Principal photography lasted 15 days starting in May 2021 in Tlalixcoyan, Veracruz in Mexico.

== Release ==
The Realm of God had its international premiere on February 15, 2022, at the 72nd Berlin International Film Festival in the Generation Kplus section. It premiered for the first time in Mexico on June 11, 2022, as part of the 37th Guadalajara International Film Festival.

== Reception ==
=== Critical reception ===
Ernesto Diezmartínez from Letras Libres wrote: "Direct naturalism, without makeup of any kind, dominates the staging of the images of Sainte-Luce and his photographer Carlos Correa, while the careful direction of the filmmaker's actors does not allow the simple story slides into any kind of sentimental blackmail."

=== Accolades ===
Year	Award	Category	Recipient	Result	Ref.
2022	Guadalajara International Film Festival	Best Mexican Film	Claudia Sainte–Luce	Won	
2022	Guadalajara International Film Festival	Best Director	Claudia Sainte–Luce	Won	
2022	Guadalajara International Film Festival	Best Actor	Diego Armando Lara Lagunes	Won	
2022	Guadalajara International Film Festival	Best Cinematography	Carlos Correa	Won	
2022	Guadalajara International Film Festival	Best Film - Young Jury Award	Claudia Sainte–Luce	Won	
2022	Gijón International Film Festival	Best Direction	Claudia Sainte–Luce	Won	
2022	Gijón International Film Festival	Best Feature Film Directed by a Woman	Claudia Sainte–Luce	Won	
2023	Ariel Awards	Best Breakthrough Performance	Diego Armando Lara	Nominated	
