= Red Shoes (2022 film) =

Film by Carlos Eichelmann Kaiser

- Venice release poster
- Spanish: Zapatos rojos
- Directed by: Carlos Eichelmann Kaiser
- Written by: Jofra G. G.; Carlos Eichelmann Kaiser; Adriana González del Valle
- Produced by: Gabriela Maldonado; Alejandro de Icaza; Carlos Eichelmann Kaiser
- Starring: Eustacio Ascacio Velázquez; Natalia Solián
- Cinematography: Serguei Saldívar Tanaka
- Edited by: Omar Guzmán
- Music by: Camilla Uboldi
- Production companies: BHD Films; 102 Distribution
- Release date: 4 October 2022 (Venice)
- Running time: 82 minutes
- Countries: Mexico; Italy
- Language: Spanish

Red Shoes (Spanish: Zapatos rojos) is a 2022 drama film directed by Carlos Eichelmann Kaiser (in his directorial debut) and written by Jofra G.G., Kaiser and Adriana González del Valle. Starring Eustacio Ascacio Velázquez, it had its world premiere in the Horrizons Extra section of the 79th Venice International Film Festival on 4 October 2022.

== Synopsis ==
Tacho is an elderly farmer who lives in a small town in the mountains where life is slow and quiet, but he embarks on a trip to Mexico City after hearing some shocking news.

== Cast ==
- Eustacio Ascacio Velázquez as Tacho
- Natalia Solián as Damiana
- Phanie Molina as Alejandra
- Miguel Ángel Valencia as Rubén

== Production ==
The film was advertised under the title 500 millones de zapatos rojos (500 Million Red Shoes) but was later retitled Zapatos rojos. Principal photography lasted three weeks in Mexico City and one week in the desert of San Luis Potosí in the midst of the COVID-19 pandemic.

== Release ==
The film had its world premiere at the 79th Venice International Film Festival on 4 October 2022. Its Mexican premiere occurred at the 20th Morelia International Film Festival in late October 2022.

== Accolades ==
Year	Award / Festival	Category	Recipient	Result	Ref.
2022	Venice International Film Festival	Audience Award - Orizzonti Extra	Carlos Eichelmann Kaiser	Nominated	
2022	Marrakech International Film Festival	Golden Star	Carlos Eichelmann Kaiser	Nominated	
2022	Morelia International Film Festival	Best Feature Film	Carlos Eichelmann Kaiser	Nominated	
2023	Sofia International Film Festival	Sofia City of Film Award	Red Shoes	Won	
2023	Sofia International Film Festival	FIPRESCI Jury Prize	Red Shoes	Won	
2023	Sofia International Film Festival	Youth Jury Award	Red Shoes	Won	
2023	Málaga Film Festival	Best Iberoamerican Film	Carlos Eichelmann Kaiser	Nominated	
2023	Málaga Film Festival	Best Cinematography	Serguei Saldívar Tanaka	Won	
2023	Ariel Awards	Best First Work	Red Shoes	Nominated	
2023	Ariel Awards	Best Breakthrough Performance	Eustacio Ascacio	Nominated	
2023	Ariel Awards	Best Cinematography	Serguei Saldívar Tanaka	Nominated	
2023	Ariel Awards	Best Original Score	Camilla Uboldi	Won	
2023	Ariel Awards	Best Art Direction	Nohemí González	Nominated	
