= I'm No Longer Here =

2019 film

- Netflix release poster
- Spanish: Ya no estoy aquí
- Directed by: Fernando Frías de la Parra
- Written by: Fernando Frías de la Parra
- Produced by: Gerardo Gatica; Alberto Muffelmann; Gerry Kim; Fernando Frías de la Parra
- Starring: Juan Daniel García Treviño; Yahir Alday; Angelina Chen
- Cinematography: Damian Garcia
- Edited by: Yibrán Asuad; Fernando Frías de la Parra
- Production companies: Panorama Global; PPW Films
- Distributed by: Netflix
- Release dates: 21 October 2019 (FICM); 27 February 2020 (Mexico); 27 May 2020 (Netflix)
- Running time: 112 minutes
- Countries: Mexico; United States
- Languages: Spanish; English; Mandarin Chinese

I'm No Longer Here (Spanish: Ya no estoy aquí) is a 2019 Mexican drama film written and directed by Fernando Frías de la Parra, and starring Juan Daniel García Treviño and Angelina Chen.

The script, completed in 2013, was originally published as a short story before being adapted as a full-length feature. It was released on 27 February 2020 to positive reviews from critics, before receiving a global Netflix release on 27 May 2020.

The film was also screened in several film festivals including the 2020 Tribeca Film Festival and received several awards and nominations in international festivals. It was selected as the Mexican entry for the Best International Feature Film at the 93rd Academy Awards, making the shortlist of fifteen films, but was not nominated.

== Plot ==
The film is presented in a nonlinear narrative, jumping between Ulises's experiences in Mexico and the United States. The following is a linear summary of the plot:

In 2011, in the slums of Monterrey, a 17-year-old named Ulises is the leader of a gang called Los Terkos. They dedicate themselves to hanging out and following the counter-culture of Kolombia: a lifestyle that consists of dancing and listening to "Cumbia rebajada" (a slowed version of Cumbia). (Note: Kolombia, lo kolombia, los colombias or cholombiano is an urban subculture that emerged in Monterrey, Nuevo León, Mexico. It is characterized by a cholo-inspired outfit with strong Colombian elements, as well as a predilection for lowered cumbia and vallenato.) Los Terkos members dress in bright, baggy clothes and sport homemade, eccentric hairdos. The majority of their time is spent attending dance parties and showing off their stylish colors.

While intimidating some students outside a school for some money so that Los Terkos can buy an MP3 player, Ulises and his gang are confronted by a member of an organized criminal group called Los F (Note: It is heavily implied that Los F is a powerful Mexican drug cartel that has taken over the city of Monterrey, to the point of decimating all other gangs in the city, such as Los Terkos (the gang that the protagonist Ulisses was a member of) and Los Pelones.) who tries to scare them away. Later, as a different member of Los F is arrested by police, one of the Terkos steals the criminal's hand radio. That night, Los Terkos play a prank on Los F using the radio, only to be easily located by two armed members of Los F who threaten Ulises and his friend Jeremy to quit their relaxed gang lifestyle or be killed.

The next day, Ulises accidentally witnesses the drive-by shooting of members of a fellow gang, Los Pelones, (Note: English: "The Bald Ones") by Los F. One of the survivors, while badly wounded, notices Ulises holding the radio the Terkos stole from Los F earlier and incorrectly assumes that Ulises had set up the shooting. The survivor accuses Ulises of being a traitor and orders him to run away, threatening to kill his family if he does not. Ulises and his family flee the slum, and his mother uses some favors to smuggle Ulises into the United States illegally, demanding that he stay away from criminal activities. As Ulises leaves, one of the Terkos, Chaparra, gives Ulises the MP3 device that Los Terkos had planned to purchase from a bootleg music salesman.

After being smuggled inside a van across the border, Ulises arrives in Queens, and lives with a group of day laborers who he soon gets into conflict with due to his lack of experience with manual labor, not knowing English, and his musical preferences. This leads to a fight with one of his roommates when they turn off the music during a party. After the fight, he leaves and takes a job cleaning the rooftop of a store owned by Mr. Loh, a Chinese man. His grandniece, Lin, is curious about Ulises and befriends him, wanting to learn more about his past way of life. She buys him a dictionary to help him learn English and allows Ulises to live in a run-down shed on the roof.

Ulises tries to earn some easy money by dancing to his Kumbia in a subway station and in the streets, only to be scared away each time by police and homeless people. He attends a party with Lin but leaves alone after getting drunk on beer and feeling homesick. He calls home but his mother rejects the idea of coming back, as Los F would kill him on sight. He goes back to a Latin bar he had gone to with his former roommates to seek advice from a Colombian sex worker he briefly connected with while there. After spending the night in her living room, she tells him that she cannot see him again, either at the bar or at her apartment. Ulises wanders the streets and buys a bottle of paint thinner. He inhales it before cutting his hair while intoxicated.

Ulises is caught sleeping in the streets by the police and is deported back to Mexico after spending some months in prison. He travels back to his slum in Monterrey to find that Los F have taken control of the populace, with most of Los Terkos having joined the criminal organization. After attending the funeral of one of his old Terko friends, Ulises visits Jeremy. He finds that Jeremy has converted to Christianity and spends his days preaching, in rap form, to other boys in the slum. Despite an offer to stay with Jeremy, Ulises decides to live on the streets by himself. He dances one last time to the music on his MP3 device before the battery dies. In the distance, he sees a large group of neighborhood residents running towards the slums to hide from the police after deliberately blocking a major avenue as a distraction, allowing the members of Los F to run away and avoid arrest.

== Cast ==
- Juan Daniel García Treviño as Ulises Sampiero
- Jonathan Espinoza as Jeremy
- Angelina Chen as Lin
- Coral Puente as Chaparra
- Adríana Arbelaez as Gladys
- Leonardo Garxa as Pekesillo
- Yahir Alday as Sudadera
- David Angel Lozano Mendiola

== Production ==
Filming took place in Monterrey before being forced to pause for a year after Juan Daniel García Treviño's visa application to travel to New York City was rejected three times by the United States embassy in Mexico.

== Reception ==
=== Critical response ===
I'm No Longer Here has an approval rating of 98% on review aggregator website Rotten Tomatoes, based on 45 reviews, and an average rating of 7.8/10. The website's critical consensus states: "I'm No Longer Here's occasionally uneven narrative is more than offset by its honest and visually poetic approach to themes of identity and assimilation. Metacritic assigned the film a weighted average score of 72 out of 100, based on 6 critics, indicating "generally favorable reviews".

=== Awards and nominations ===
Year	Award	Category	Result	References
2019	Cairo International Film Festival	Best Actor – Juan Daniel Garcia Treviño	Won	
2019	Cairo International Film Festival	Golden Pyramid Best Film	Won	
2019	Morelia International Film Festival	Audience Award	Won	
2019	Morelia International Film Festival	Best Feature Film	Won	
2020	Göteborg Film Festival	Dragon Award	Nominated	
2021	Satellite Awards	Best Foreign Language Film	Nominated	
2021	Goya Awards	Best Iberoamerican Film	Nominated	
2021	Directors Guild of America Awards	First-Time Feature Film	Nominated	
2021	Golden Reel Awards	Best Sound Editing – Foreign Language	Nominated	

=== Soundtrack ===
Track	Artist	Title
1	La Tropa Vallenata	Cumbia Campesina
2	Andres Landero y Su Conjunto	Muchachas Cumbiamberas
3	Andres Landero y Su Conjunto	Perdí las Abarcas
4	La Retumba	Muerto Capítulo
5	Anibal Velasquez	Besos sobre besos
6	José Maria Peñaranda	La Pringamosa
7	Aimer El Sensei	Aposte a Nada
8	Pedro Laza y Sus Pelayeros	Cumbia del Monte
9	Gildardo Montoya & Su Conjunto Los Rumberos	Cumbia del Puerto
10	Andres Landero y Su Conjunto	Bailando Cumbia
11	Lisandro Meza	Lejanía
12	Banda Tierra Sagrada (feat. fr. Marco Flores de la #1 Banda)	Soy un Desmadre
13	Pancho Uresti	Con Estilo
14	Alfredo Gutierrez y Su Conjunto	Prende la Vela
15	Aniceta Molina y su Conjunto	Flor Maria
16	Asi Se Baila la Cumbia	Inspiracion Colombia
17	Mi Mala Suerte	Inspiracion Colombia
18	Aniceto Molina y su Conjunto	Mayo
19	Aniceto Molina	La Faldita Coqueta
20	Soaky Siren	Upside Down
21	Lisandro Meza y Su Conjunto	Te Llevaré
22	Andres Landero y Su Conjunto	Cuando Lo Negro Sea Bello
23	Octubre 82	Quiero Decirte Hoy
24	Adriana del Valle	Ladrona de Amor
25	Peñaranda y su Conjunto	La Cumbia-Cumbia de mi Tierra
26	Andrés Landero y su Conjunto	Muchachas Cumbiamberas
27	Soaky Siren	Upside Down
28	Aimer El Sensei	Aposté a Nada
29	Ulises Zarazua	Superstar
30	Los Terkos	Flor de Mayo
31	Mister Softee Jingle	Mister Softee Jingle and Chimes
32	Jonathan Fernando Espinosa	Recuperándome
33	Jonathan Fernando Espinosa	Ya No Estoy Aquí
34	Mobley, Josh/Denson, Moria/Hawkins II/Erskine	Stand Up (Put Our Fists Up)
35	Loosli, Timo/Franzino, Ian/Fohl, Liz	We Don't Give A

== See also ==
- List of submissions to the 93rd Academy Awards for Best International Feature Film
- List of Mexican submissions for the Academy Award for Best International Feature Film
