= Who's a Good Boy? =

El Guau
- Netflix release poster
- Directed by: Ihtzi Hurtado
- Written by: Ihtzi Hurtado
- Produced by: Roberto Fiesco; Sandro Halphen; Iliana Reyes
- Starring: Sebastian Dante; Sirena Ortiz; Adrian Vazquez; Grettell Valdez
- Cinematography: Javier Morón
- Edited by: Gilberto González Penilla
- Music by: Sebastian Bell; Axel Ricco
- Distributed by: Netflix
- Release date: November 23, 2022
- Running time: 95 minutes
- Country: Mexico
- Language: Spanish

Who's a Good Boy? (Spanish: El Guau) is a 2022 Mexican sex comedy film written and directed by Ihtzi Hurtado. It stars Sebastian Dante, Sirena Ortiz, Adrian Vazquez and Grettell Valdez.

== Synopsis ==
Chema is in his last year of high school and is distressed about how all his friends have been able to lose their virginity except for him. At school he fails miserably at attempting to talk to girls. He is visited by his uncle Jaimé who gives him substantial relationship advice and lets him use his truck.

Suddenly, the principal asks him to be a guide for Claudia, the new girl at his school. She immediately expresses romantic interest in him but he is scared to reciprocate it. He drives her to school and takes her to exotic dance classes.

At the same time, Eli, a longtime female friend of his, tries to get him to play in a band together for Las Posadas celebration. She is distraught when she sees him walking around with Claudia. Claudia and Chema get closer, but Jaimé warns him of the various signs (most notably: hugging) that separate platonic best friends and a romantic relationship.

Claudia invites him to a party at her house where Chema sees her dancing with both men and women. She takes him to her room where she tries to get intimate and out of sheer fear Chema still does not reciprocate. The next morning, Jaimé, his sister and his mother hear of his situation. His sister warns him that he may become Claudia's "guau," i.e. a "human pet" who is effectively a servant for a more popular girl who must forego any romantic relations with her.

To his surprise, Claudia asks him to be his date for Las Posadas. Later, Claudia (without telling Chema) invites another guy, Sebas, to her house. Chema sneaks in and sees them fooling around. He strips and attempts to join in but then her mother walks in. He escapes unseen, but is later called by Claudia asking him why he left his clothes there. She reaffirms they are best friends, and that she is actually going to Las Posadas with Sebas, but that she will help him invite Eli.

Jaimé rents a limousine for him and his friends and gives them condoms. At the dance, Chema and Eli are having a good time until Claudia finds them. Claudia gets him to confess that he wanted to be in a relationship just as Sebas shows up and they mock him. Eli overhears the conversation and abandons him.

Over the next few weeks Chema tries to reach out and apologize multiple times but she rebuffs him. Jaimé suddenly leaves. As they are nearing graduation, he gets into a loud argument with Sebas and his friends stating that no one should be a "guau." Bystanders clap at him and Sebas reconciles with him.

At graduation, Claudia tries to get romantic with him again only for him to friendzone her. At the same time he has won Eli over with expensive gifts; they become a couple. Chema decides to abandon his planned engineering degree in favor of music, his lifelong passion. On the class graduation trip to Cancún, Chema and Eli are caught having sex in an airplane bathroom.

== Cast ==
The actors participating in this film are:

- Sebastian Dante as Chema
- Sirena Ortiz as Claudia
- Adrian Vazquez as Jaime
- Grettell Valdez as Gloria
- Diego Meléndez as Hugo
- Harold Azuara as Rubén
- Luisa Guzmán Quintero as Eli
- Yankel Stevan as Sebastián
- Nashla Aguilar as Ana
- Estefania Coppola
- Andrea Mextli
- Marialicia Delgado

== Release ==
The film was released worldwide on Netflix on November 23, 2022.
