= Northern Skies Over Empty Space =

El norte sobre el vacío
- Berlinale release poster
- Directed by: Alejandra Márquez Abella
- Written by: Alejandra Márquez Abella; Gabriel Nuncio
- Produced by: Antonio Aldape; Alexandro Aldrete; Brian Bartelt; Alejandro Duran; Alejandro Mares; Alejandra Márquez Abella; Karla Hernández Nassar; Gabriel Nuncio; Diego Enrique Osorno; Erick Peña; Adán Pérez; Sofía Torres Alba; Raúl Villarreal; Alejandro Zea
- Starring: Gerardo Trejoluna; Paloma Petra
- Cinematography: Claudia Becerril Bulos
- Edited by: Miguel Schverdfinger
- Music by: Tomás Barreiro
- Production company: Agencia Bengala
- Release dates: February 12, 2022 (Berlinale); October 28, 2022 (Amazon Prime Video)
- Running time: 114 minutes
- Country: Mexico
- Language: Spanish

Northern Skies Over Empty Space (Spanish: El norte sobre el vacío) is a 2022 Mexican drama film directed by Alejandra Márquez Abella and written by Abella & Gabriel Nuncio, starring Gerardo Trejoluna and Paloma Petra. It is inspired by a true story where a Mexican cowboy and hunter, named Don Alejo Garza, defended his ranch from organized crime, who wanted to take it from him in 2010. It won the Best Mexican Feature Film, Best Screenplay and Best Actor awards for Gerardo Trejoluna at the 20th Morelia International Film Festival, as well as Best Movie in the Arieles.

== Synopsis ==
Don Reynaldo is a renowned hunter on the decline, but when the threat of losing his inheritance and his father's legacy looms, his entire life is turned dangerously upside down.

== Cast ==
The actors participating in this film are:

- Gerardo Trejoluna as Don Reynaldo
- Paloma Petra as Rosa
- Dolores Heredia as Sofía
- Mayra Hermosillo as Lily
- Francisco Barreiro as Elías
- Mariana Villegas as Laura
- Fernando Bonilla as Raúl
- Juan Daniel García Treviño as Tello
- Raúl Briones as Guzmán
- Marco García as Arnulfo
- Yahir Alday as Braulio
- Gabriel Almaguer as Wenceslao
- Bebo Cantú as Félix
- Gabriel Nuncio as Pepón
- Camille Mina as Vicky
- Pato Alvarado as Adrián
- Diego García as Beto
- Mariel Alanís as Isis
- Aglae Lingow as Bunny
- Leonardo Huerta as Clown
- Carlos Lenin as Cousin 1
- Ernesto Treviño as Cousin 2
- Oliver Cantú Lozano as Cowboy 1
- Hamish Anderson as Cowboy 2

== Production ==
Principal photography took place in the states of Nuevo León and Tamaulipas, Mexico, where they had to deal with organized crime to film in peace.

== Release ==
Northern Skies Over Empty Space had its international premiere on February 12, 2022, at the 72nd Berlin International Film Festival as part of the Panorama selection. It premiered internationally on October 28, 2022, on Amazon Prime Video.

== Reception ==
=== Critical reception ===
Lee Marshall from Screendaily wrote: "The bravura of the transition between grim school drama and western, and the way the two genres coexist and intertwine, make it so rich [...] Outstanding performances from Trejoluna and Petra". Ernesto Diezmartínez from Letras Libres wrote: "The premise is compelling and, at least in the first few minutes, Márquez Abella promises a mocking take on heroism, virility, and toxic patriarchy ... Unfortunately, in the second part the film completely collapses, between dispersion and indecision: the class tensions between Don Reynaldo and all his employees –especially with the bragada Rosita– are more than obvious but are handled in a confusing way, there are telegraphed twists that go nowhere".

=== Accolades ===
Year	Award / Festival	Category	Recipient	Result	Ref.
2022	Berlin International Film Festival	Panorama Audience Award	Alejandra Márquez Abella	Nominated	
2022	Morelia International Film Festival	Best Feature Film	Alejandra Márquez Abella	Won	
2022	Morelia International Film Festival	Best Screenplay	Alejandra Márquez Abella & Gabriel Nuncio	Won	
2022	Morelia International Film Festival	Best Actor	Gerardo Trejoluna	Won	
2023	Diosas de Plata	Best Actor	Gerardo Trejoluna	Nominated	
2023	Diosas de Plata	Best Supporting Actress	Paloma Petra	Nominated	
2023	Diosas de Plata	Best Actor in a Minor Role	Raúl Briones	Nominated	
2023	Ariel Awards	Best Picture	Northern Skies Over Empty Space	Won	
2023	Ariel Awards	Best Director	Alejandra Márquez Abella	Nominated	
2023	Ariel Awards	Best Actor	Gerardo Trejoluna	Nominated	
2023	Ariel Awards	Best Supporting Actress	Dolores Heredia	Nominated	
2023	Ariel Awards	Best Supporting Actor	Fernando Bonilla	Nominated	
2023	Ariel Awards	Best Supporting Actor	Raúl Briones	Won	
2023	Ariel Awards	Best Original Screenplay	Alejandra Márquez Abella & Gabriel Nuncio	Nominated	
2023	Ariel Awards	Best Cinematography	Claudia Becerril Bulos	Nominated	
2023	Ariel Awards	Best Original Score	Tomás Barreiro	Nominated	
2023	Ariel Awards	Best Sound	Pablo Betancourt, Zulu González, Yuri Laguna & Gerardo Villareal	Nominated	
2023	Ariel Awards	Best Editing	Miguel Schverdfinger	Nominated	
2023	Ariel Awards	Best Art Direction	Sandra Cabriada	Nominated	
2023	Ariel Awards	Best Makeup	Pedro Guijarro	Nominated	
2023	Ariel Awards	Best Costume Design	Amanda Cárcamo	Nominated	
2023	Ariel Awards	Best Special Effects	Luis Eduardo Ambriz	Nominated	
2023	Ariel Awards	Best Visual Effects	Raúl Luna	Nominated	
