= Esther Seligson =

Mexican author (1941–2010)

- Born: 25 October 1941; Mexico City, Mexico
- Died: 8 February 2010 (aged 68); Mexico City, Mexico
- Education: UNAM; Instituto de Cultura Superior
- Occupations: Academic; Writer; Poet
- Years active: 1965–2010

Esther Seligson (25 October 1941 – 8 February 2010) was a Mexican writer, poet, translator, and historian. She was an academic, with a wide range of interests including art, cultural history, Jewish philosophy, mythology, religion and theater. She published books, poems, short stories and translations. She won the Xavier Villaurrutia Prize and the Magda Donato Award for her literary contributions.

== Biography ==
Esther Seligson was born 25 October 1941 in Mexico City, Mexico, to a family of Orthodox Jews. She wanted to be a dancer, but her parents were strongly opposed, so she began studying chemistry at the National Autonomous University of Mexico before changing her academic direction.

Seligson studied Spanish and French Literature at the National Autonomous University of Mexico (UNAM) and earned a Master's in art history at the Instituto de Cultura Superior (Institute of High Culture). She continued her studies at La Sorbonne and the University of Bordeaux, focusing on history, the Middle Ages, and philosophy. Later, she studied Jewish culture at the Centre Universitaire d'Etudes Juives (The University Center of Jewish Studies) in Paris and Pardes Institute of Jewish Studies in Jerusalem.

Seligson began publishing at the age of twenty-four in the Cuadernos del Viento de Huberto Batis and Revista Mexicana de Literatura. She published, her first book, Tras la ventada de un árbol, a collection of stories, at twenty-eight and followed it with Otros son los sueños which won the 1973 Premio Xavier Villaurrutia (Xavier Villaurrutia Prize) from the National Council for Arts and Culture. One of her most important works is La morada en el tiempo (1981), which evaluated the isolation of a Jewish believer throughout time. In her 1984 book, Diálogos con el cuerpo she looks at the body, the heart, lungs, stomach, as a lover, in a sensual discovery of their sensations. These were followed by Luz de dos (1989), which won the Magda Donato Award. She published many other works, mostly not for commercial audiences. Her last book, Todo aquí es polvo was finished three weeks before her death and was published posthumously.

She taught theater history at the Centro Universitario de Teatro (University Center of Theater) at UNAM for twenty-five years and at the Centro de Estudios Hebraicos (Centre for Hebraic Studies). She also served as a guest lecturer at Centro de Arte Dramático A.C. (CADACP), Instituto Nacional de Bellas Artes y Literatura (INBA), Instituto Nacional de Antropología e Historia (INAH), Universidad Autónoma Metropolitana (UAM), as well as many other institutions. She possessed a wide range of expertise and taught courses on art of the Middle Ages, comparative religion, cultural history, ideological history, Jewish philosophy, mythology, theater history, theatrical production and stagecraft. Throughout her career, Seligson collaborated in many newspapers and magazines in Mexico. She translated the work of Romanian philosopher Emile Michel Cioran; Egyptian Jewish poet, Edmond Jabès; Emmanuel Levinas; Virginia Woolf; and Marguerite Yourcenar, as well as others. She was made a fellow of the Mexican Center of Writers in 1969, served as project coordinator of the Directorate General of Popular Culture from 1977 to 1979 and was on the editorial board of the magazine Escénica, published by UNAM.

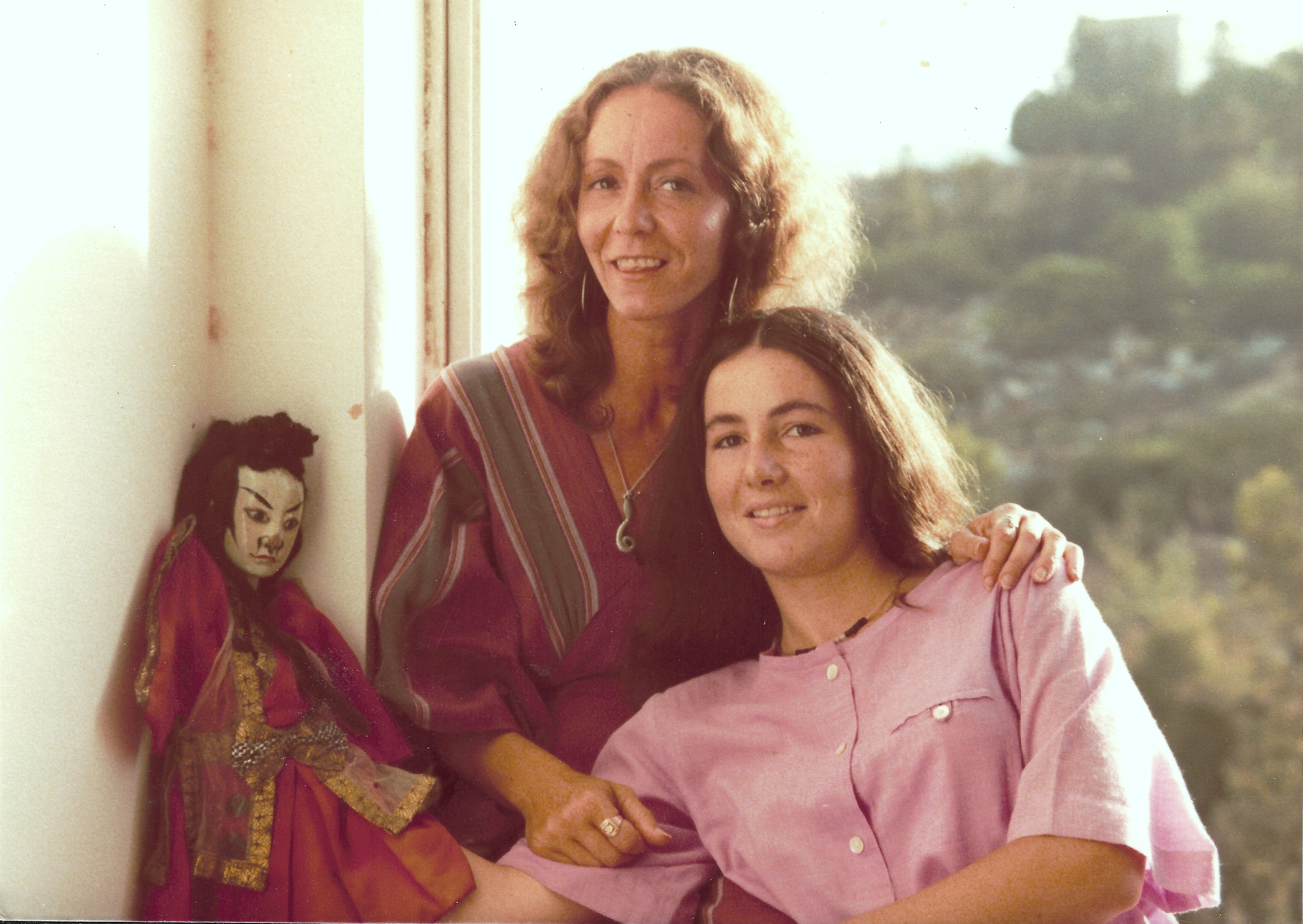
Esther Seligson with the Argentine Mexican poet Claudia Kerik in Jerusalem (ca. 1981)

She enjoyed traveling, believing that "It's good to be wandering pilgrim. Feeling alien in every city where you live gives you more emotional contact." She journeyed to southern India, Paris, Prague, Tibet, and Toledo, Spain. For a brief period, Seligson settled in Lisbon and later took up residence in Jerusalem.

Seligson died 8 February 2010 in Mexico City, Mexico and was buried in the Panteón Israelita.

== Selected works ==
The selection of works (in Spanish) follows the listing of the Coordinación Nacional de Literatura Registra y Difunde la Literatura en México.

=== Essays ===
- La fugacidad como método de escritura, Plaza y Valdés, 1988.
- El teatro, festín efímero, UAM, Cultura Universitaria, 1989.
- Escritura y el enigma de la otredad, Ediciones Sin Nombre, 2000.
- Apuntes sobre Cioran, FONCA/CONACULTA, La Centena, 2003.
- A campo traviesa, FCE, Letras Mexicanas, 2005.

=== Novels and short stories ===
- Tras la ventana un árbol (1969)
- Otros son los sueños (1973)
- La morada del tiempo (1981)
- Diálogos con el cuerpo (1981)
- Las figuraciones como método de escritura (1981)
- Sed de mar (1986)
- Luz de dos (1989)
- La fugacidad como método de escritura (1989)
- Los siete pecados capitales (colectivo) (1989)
- El teatro, festín efímero (1990)
- Indicios y quimeras, isomorfismos (1991)
- A campo traviesa (2005)
- Toda la luz (2006)
- Todo aquí es polvo (2010, released posthumously)

=== Poems ===
- Tránsito del cuerpo (1977)
- De sueños, presagios y otras voces (1978)
- Rescoldos (2000)
- Simiente (2003)
- Alba marina (2005)
- Oración del retorno (tikun) (2006)
- A los pies de un Buda sonriente (2007)
- Negro es su rostro (2010)
