= Finding the End of the World =

- Theatrical release poster
- Directed by: Fabián Corres
- Written by: Fabián Corres; Monserrat Leon Conde; Gérard Á. Reséndiz
- Produced by: Vianney Barragan; Guillermo Briseño; Rubén Bross; Eduardo Cabral; Miriam Higareda; Adelaida Malet; Moira Menéndez; Matias Novoa; Alejandra Alanis Ortiz; Yazmin Portugal; Federico Quintana; Elsa Reyes; Rocio Rubio Roman; Jorge Sarvide; Mauricio Valle; Freddy Mauricio Dart Verduzco
- Starring: Fabián Corres; Alba Alonso; Emiliano Corres; Ximena Duggan
- Release date: December 1, 2022 (Mexico)
- Running time: 83 minutes
- Country: Mexico
- Language: Spanish
- Budget: $150.000

Finding the End of the World (Spanish: Encontrando el fin del mundo) is a 2022 Mexican drama film directed, co-written and starred by Fabián Corres in his directorial debut.

== Synopsis ==
A musician seeks to compose a piece of the urban sound of the street while struggling to maintain his mental health after the death of his wife and his youngest son, with the aim of connecting with his eldest son.

== Cast ==
The actors participating in this film are:

- Fabián Corres as Jorge Rodríguez
- Alba Alonso as Laura
- Emiliano Corres as Lucas Rodríguez
- Ximena Duggan as Daniela
- Alberto Guerra as Jorge's brother
- Thali García as Marie
- Mateo Corres as Damián Rodríguez
- Fernanda Castillo as Wife
- Ramon Medina as Homeless
- Noe Sanz as Customer

== Release ==
It was commercially released on December 1, 2022, in Mexican theaters.

== Accolades ==
Year	Award / Festival	Category	Recipient	Result	Ref.
2022	Love & Hope International Film Festival	Best Feature Film	Fabián Corres	Won	
2022	Love & Hope International Film Festival	Best Director in a Feature Film	Fabián Corres	Won	
2022	Austin International Art Festival	Best Director in a Long Feature Film	Fabián Corres	Won	
