= Natalia Beristáin =

Mexican filmmaker

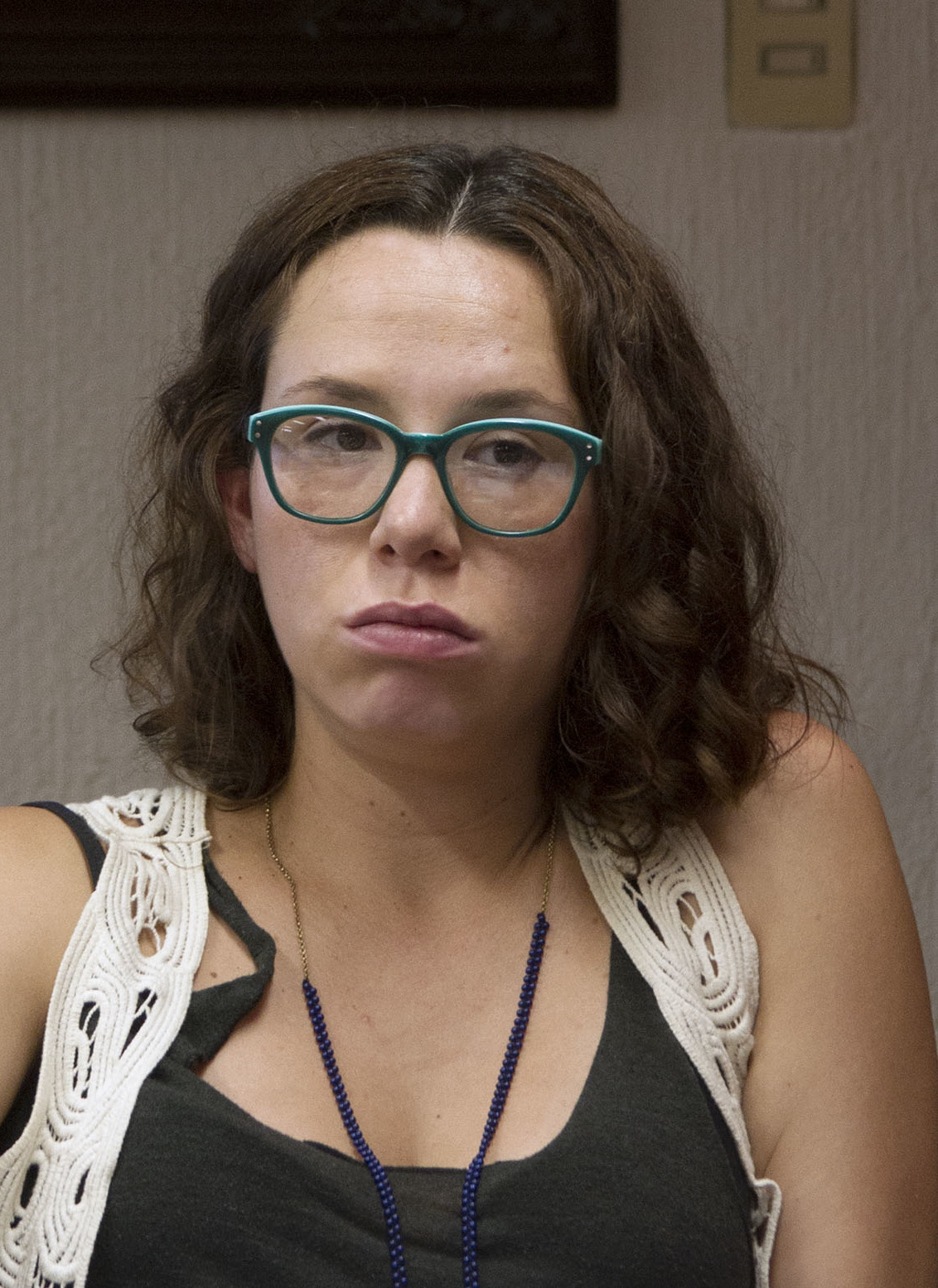
- Beristáin in 2015
- Born: Natalia Beristáin Egurrola; 28 June 1981 (age 44); Mexico City, Mexico
- Occupation(s): Film director Screenwriter
- Parents: Arturo Beristáin (father); Julieta Egurrola (mother)

Natalia Beristáin (born 28 June 1981) is a Mexican film director and screenwriter. She is best known for directing and co-writing the film She Doesn't Want to Sleep Alone which won the Best Feature Film at the 10th Morelia International Film Festival, directing the film The Eternal Feminine which won the Audience Award at the 15th Morelia International Film Festival, and directing and co-writing the film Noise which won the Spanish Cooperation Award at the 70th San Sebastián International Film Festival.

== Films directed ==
- 2006 – Peces plátano (Short)
- 2009 – Pentimento (Short)
- 2012 – She Doesn't Want to Sleep Alone
- 2017 – The Eternal Feminine
- 2022 – Noise
