= La Civil =

2021 film

La civil
- International release poster
- Directed by: Teodora Mihai
- Written by: Habacuc Antonio De Rosario; Teodora Mihai
- Produced by: Hans Everaert
- Starring: Arcelia Ramírez
- Cinematography: Marius Panduru
- Edited by: Alain Dessauvage
- Music by: Jean-Stephane Garbe; Hugo Lippens
- Release date: 9 July 2021 (Cannes)
- Countries: Belgium; Romania; Mexico
- Language: Spanish
- Box office: $199,941

La civil is a 2021 internationally co-produced drama film directed by Teodora Mihai. In June 2021, the film was selected to compete in the Un Certain Regard section at the 2021 Cannes Film Festival. At Cannes, it won the Prize of Courage in the Un Certain Regard section.

== Cast ==
- Arcelia Ramírez as Ciero
- Álvaro Guerrero as Gustavo
- Juan Daniel García Treviño as El Puma
- Jorge A. Jimenez as Lamarque

== Reception ==
On review aggregator Rotten Tomatoes, the film holds an approval rating of 86% based on 28 reviews, with an average rating of 7.6/10.

Cath Clarke of The Guardian called the film a "brilliantly realistic nightmare that stays believable right up to the end", while Manuel Betancourt of Variety called it "an unsparing drama about the never ending cycle of violence in Northern Mexico".

Writing for Salon.com, Gary M. Kramer wrote "[the film is an] authentic portrait of this dangerous world".
