= Robe of Gems =

- Theatrical release poster
- Directed by: Natalia López Gallardo
- Written by: Natalia López Gallardo
- Produced by: Natalia López Gallardo; Fernanda de la Peza; Joaquín del Paso
- Starring: Nailea Norvind; Juan Daniel García Treviño; Sherlyn Zavala; Balam Toledo
- Cinematography: Adrian Durazo
- Edited by: Omar Guzman; Natalia López; Miguel Schverdfinger
- Music by: Santiago Pedroncini
- Production companies: Cárcava Cine; Rei Cine
- Distributed by: Santa Cine
- Release dates: February 11, 2022 (Berlinale); July 7, 2022 (Argentina); March 9, 2023 (Mexico)
- Running time: 118 minutes
- Countries: Mexico; Argentina; United States
- Language: Spanish

Robe of Gems (Spanish: Manto de gemas) is a 2022 drama film written and directed by Natalia López Gallardo in her directorial debut. Starring Nailea Norvind, Juan Daniel García Treviño, Sherlyn Zavala and Balam Toledo. It competed for the Golden Bear and won the Silver Bear Jury Prize at the 72nd Berlin International Film Festival.

== Synopsis ==
A woman whose sister has disappeared; another, in the process of a divorce, offers to help her; a third, a commercial police officer, attempts to reform her son, who is fascinated with the organized crime lifestyle.

== Cast ==
The actors participating in this film are:

- Nailea Norvind as Isabel
- Juan Daniel García Treviño as Adán
- Sherlyn Zavala as Valeria
- Balam Toledo as Benjamín
- Mario Torres as Manuel
- Adriana Gallardo as Manuel's wife
- Israel Sánchez as "El ratón"
- Francisco Berdiales as Argentine cousin
- Reina Carmona as Daughter
- Diana Galicia as Lupe
- Ventura Rendón as Ventura
- Maura Guerrero as Venture's Mother
- Ollin Winteler as Ollin
- Manuel Torres as Moska
- Sayel Sotola as Violeta
- Axel Sánchez as Axel
- Edith Salazar as Aurora
- Eugenia Salazar as Police chief
- Antonia Olivares

== Release ==
=== Festivals ===
It had its international premiere on February 11, 2022, at the 72nd Berlin International Film Festival competing for the Golden Bear. It then premiered on April 14, 2022, at the 41st International Istanbul Film Festival, Turkey, on April 22 of the same year at New Directors/New Films Festival, US, on July 24 of the same year at the Jerusalem Film Festival, Israel, on August 13 of the same year at the Melbourne International Film Festival, Australia, on September 22 of the same year at the 70th San Sebastián International Film Festival, USA and on October 11 of the same year at the BFI London Film Festival, United Kingdom

=== Theatrical ===
It had its commercial premiere on July 7, 2022, in Argentine theaters and on March 9, 2023, in Mexican theaters.

== Reception ==
=== Critical reception ===
On the review aggregator website Rotten Tomatoes, 83% of 12 critics' reviews are positive, with an average rating of 7.5/10.

Milagros Amondaray from La Nación called it a denouncement film, but with touches of magical realism and impenetrable sequences that invite you to look even if you want to look the other way. Peter Bradshaw from The Guardian highlights the handling of the camera in film photography, making audiences more vulnerable to moments of shock or high impact. On the other hand, Valerie Complex from Deadline Hollywood criticizes the cinematography of the film, calling it irritating that tests patience, and although he recognizes its purpose, but the constant repetition of this element prevents an interpersonal interaction with the audience, the same goes for the type of lighting used and the editing, although It also highlights the existence of beautifully framed shots and the acting quality of all the actors, managing to capture a hopeless passage.

=== Accolades ===
Year	Award	Category	Recipient	Result	Ref.
2022	Berlin International Film Festival	Golden Bear	Natalia López	Nominated	
2022	Berlin International Film Festival	Silver Bear Jury Prize	Natalia López	Won	
2022	Jerusalem Film Festival	Best International Debut	Natalia López	Nominated	
2022	Motovun Film Festival	Best Film	Natalia López	Nominated	
2022	San Sebastián International Film Festival	Zabaltegi-Tabakalera Award	Natalia López	Nominated	
2022	BFI London Film Festival	First Feature Competition	Natalia López	Nominated	
2022	Nashville Film Festival	Best New Directors Feature	Natalia López	Nominated	
2022	Tacoma Film Festival	Best Narrative Feature	Natalia López	Nominated	
2022	Sarajevo Film Festival	Special Award for the Promotion of Gender Equality	Natalia López	Nominated	
2022	São Paulo International Film Festival	Best Film	Natalia López	Nominated	
2022	Morelia International Film Festival	Best Mexican Feature Film	Natalia López	Nominated	
2022	Morelia International Film Festival	Best Director	Natalia López	Won	
2022	Melbourne International Film Festival	Bright Horizons Award	Natalia López	Nominated	
2023	Diosas de Plata	Best First Work	Natalia López	Nominated	
2023	Ariel Awards	Best First Work	Robe of Gems	Nominated	
2023	Ariel Awards	Best Sound	Thomas Becka, Carlos Cortés, Raúl Locatelli & Victor Tendler	Nominated	
