= Úrsula Pruneda =

Mexican actress (born 1971)

- Born: 1971 (age 54–55); Mexico City, Mexico
- Occupation: Actress

Ursula Pruneda Blum (born Mexico City, 1971) is a Mexican actress of the stage and screen. She trained under Luis de Tavira, Raúl Quintanilla, José Caballero, Esther Seligson, Sandra Félix and Héctor Mendoza, among others. She has acted in numerous theatrical productions, feature films, short films, video artworks and telenovelas. She is best known for her work in the 2012 film El Sueno de Lu, which won her the Ariel Award for Best Actress, among many other nominations and awards.
