= Juan Daniel García Treviño =

Mexican singer, actor and dancer

Daniel García
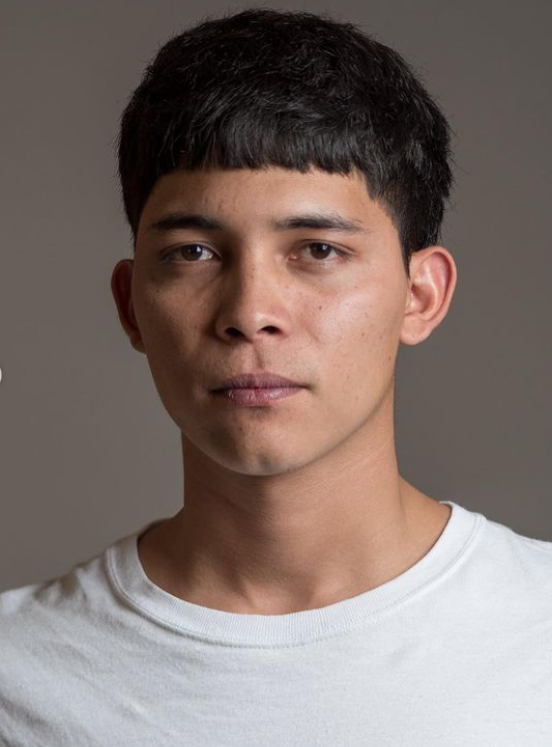
- Born: 2000 (age 25–26); Monterrey, Nuevo León, Mexico
- Occupations: Actor; singer
- Years active: 2019–present
- Awards: Ariel Award for Best Breakthrough Performance (2020)
- Musical career
- Label: Docemil

Juan Daniel García Treviño (born 2000) is a Mexican singer, actor and dancer who was born in Nuevo León. He is most well known for playing the main role in the 2019 movie I'm No Longer Here by Fernando Frías. When he was cast for the role, he was 16 years old and working in welding and construction, with no previous acting experience. García's father was a drug dealer and he dropped out of school in fifth grade. Garcia won an Ariel Award, Mexico's top film prize, for Breakthrough Performance. Since the movie, he has also worked as a model for Elle and GQ in Mexico.

He has also acted in the feature films La civil, Robe of Gems, Northern Skies Over Empty Space and Wetiko. He has further played a small role in an episode of the series Narcos: México.

== Filmography ==
=== Films ===
Year	Title	Role	Notes
2019	I'm No Longer Here	Ulises	
2021	La Civil	El Puma	
2022	Robe of Gems	Adán	
2022	Wetiko	Aapo	
2022	Northern Skies Over Empty Space	Tello	
2023	Adolfo	Hugo	
2023	Lost in the Night	Emiliano	

=== Television ===
Year	Title	Role	Notes
2021	Narcos: Mexico		Episode «The Reckoning»
2023	VGLY		
2026	La Banda	Rivera	
