= Pablo Cruz (actor) =

Mexican actor (born 1984)

Pablo Cruz Guerrero
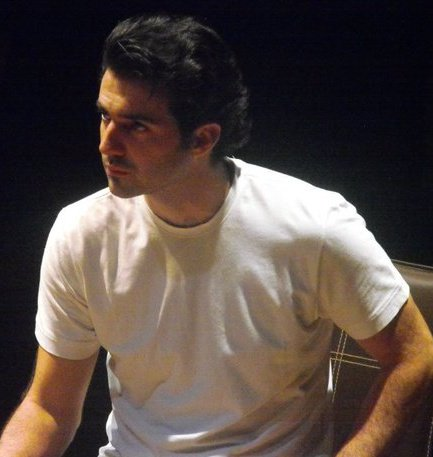
- Born: February 2, 1984 (age 41); Mexico City, Mexico
- Occupation: Actor
- Years active: 1998; 2007-present

Pablo Cruz Guerrero (born 2 February 1984) is a Mexican actor.

== Filmography ==
=== Film roles ===
Year	Title	Roles	Notes
1998	Hairshirt	Checkout Guy at Market	
2008	Casi divas	Production Employee	
2009	El estudiante	Santiago	
2011	From Prada to Nada	Gabriel Dominguez Jr.	
2013	Milagro en Praga	Pedro	
2013	Drifting Part 1	Nico	Short film
2015	Las horas contigo	Manuel	
2019	Solteras	Gabriel	
2019	En las buenas y en las malas	Erik	

=== Television roles ===
Year	Title	Roles	Notes
2008–2010	La rosa de Guadalupe	Román Martín Andrés Ian	Episode: "Un sólo corazón" Episode: "Te amaré hasta el final" Episode: "Vientos de esperanza" Episode: "La fuerza de la verdad"
2010	Cuando me enamoro	Daniel	Series regular; 39 episodes
2011	El sexo débil	Bruno Camacho	Recurring role
2013–2014	Por siempre mi amor	Daniel	Recurring role; 102 episodes
2016	El hotel de los secretos	Felipe Alarcón	Recurring role; 78 episodes
2016	Perseguidos	Emiliano Molina	Recurring role; 18 episodes
2017	Paquita la del Barrio	Nicolás	Recurring role; 9 episodes
2017–2018	Papá a toda madre	Alejandro Villaseñor	Recurring role; 4 episodes
2021	Luis Miguel: The Series	Patricio Robles	Main role (seasons 2–3)
2025	Chespirito: Sin querer queriendo	Roberto Gómez Bolaños	Main role
