= Kenya Cuevas Fuentes =

Mexican activist

Kenya Cytlaly Cuevas Fuentes
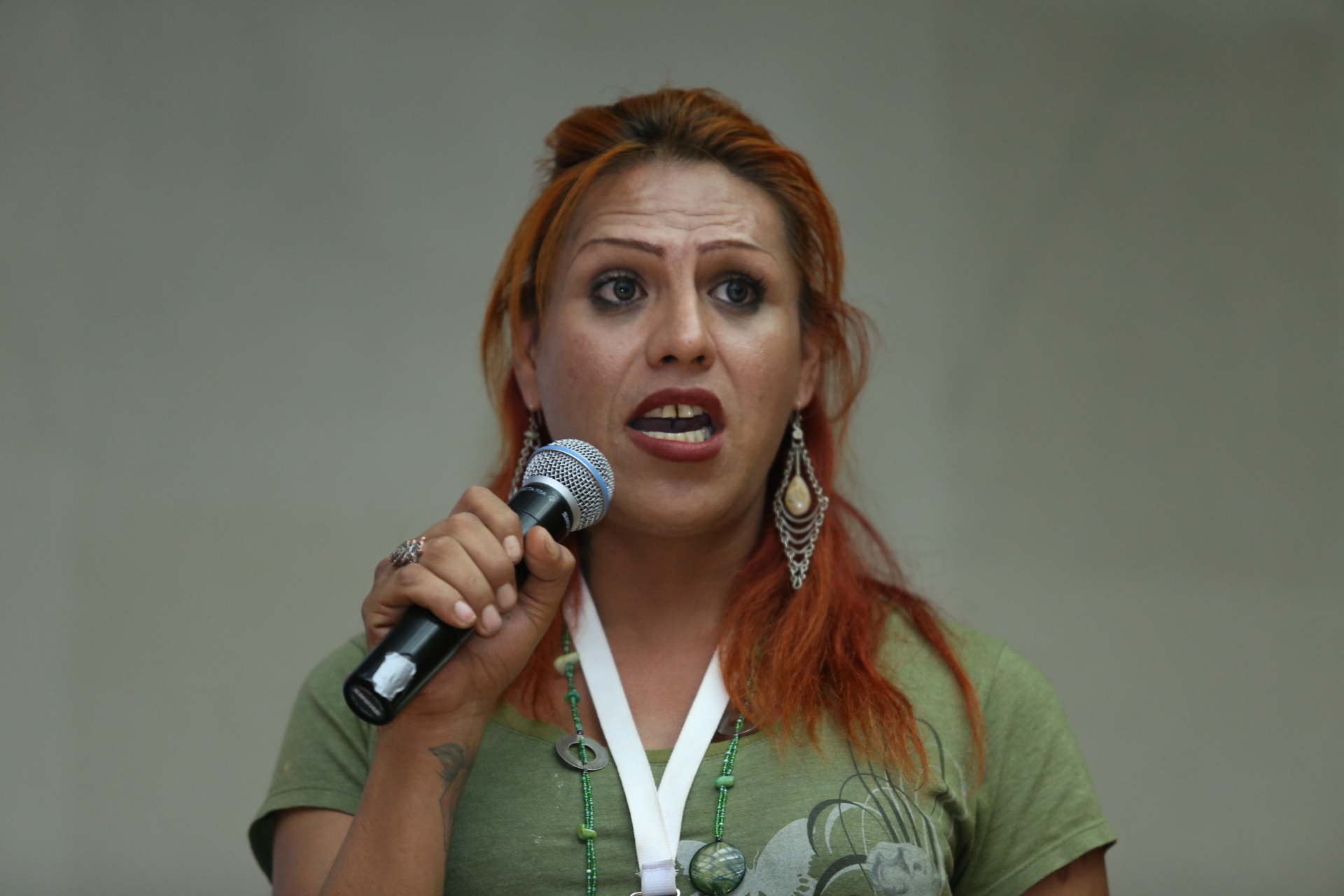
- Cuevas in 2018
- Born: 5 September 1983 (age 42); Mexico City, Mexico
- Occupations: Activist; founder and director of Casa de las Muñecas Tiresias
- Organization: Casa de las Muñecas Tiresias La Casa Hogar Paola Buenrostro

Kenya Cytlaly Cuevas Fuentes (born 5 September, 1973) is a Mexican activist who works to assist trans people and sex workers. She established the first shelter in Mexico for trans women and continues to fight for recognition of the violence committed against them. She is the general director of Casa de Las Muñecas Tiresias, which supports vulnerable people, including trans sex workers.

== Biography ==
=== Childhood ===
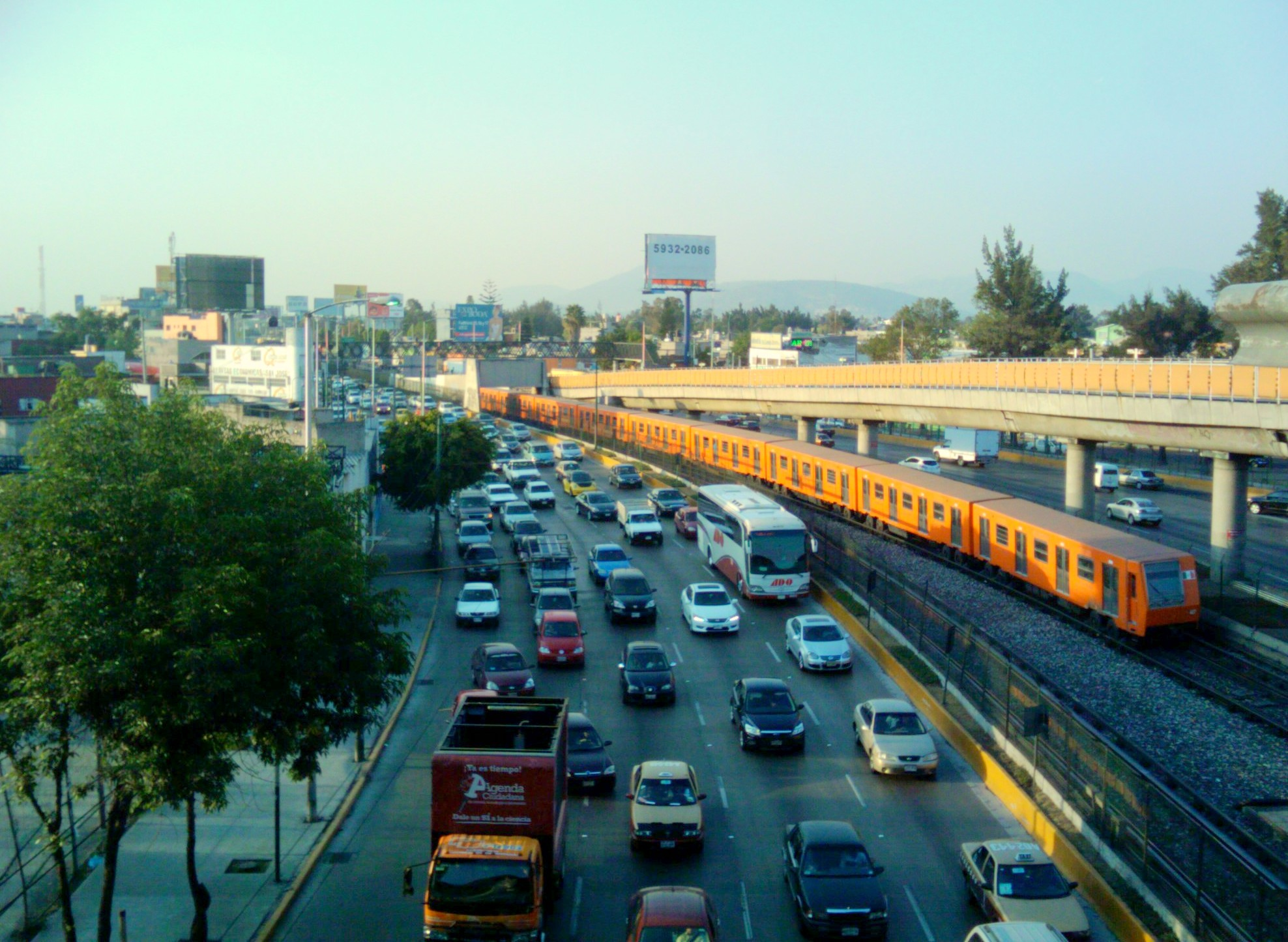
Oceanía Metro Station

Kenya Cytlaly Cuevas Fuentes was born in 1973 in Mexico City by the Oceanía metro station. She was raised by her maternal grandmother and alongside her siblings. Her mother had migrated to the United States and her father lived with another family. Up until nine years of age, she faced abuse at the hands of her siblings. Her grandmother had died and there was no one to defend her. That same year, she left home and started sex work. Wandering at night, she met a woman who she, at that time, did not realize was transgender. Instantly feeling a connection, she walked over and was told to get to work. She met her first client, explaining her situation and pleading to stay with him. He told her that she couldn't go with him, but he would pay for a week's worth of shelter and food. The next day, she connected with the other trans women residing in the hotel. They taught her how to dress and she had, for the first time, felt comfortable in her body.

=== Substance abuse ===
A few months later, she began to see an increase in clients requesting her to consume drugs prior to engaging with her services. This eventually led her to a dependency on substances. The impact of her addiction lasted from ages 11 to 28. She was houseless, had suicidal ideation, and began to neglect her transition. At 13, she was diagnosed with HIV. During one of her visits, the apartment where she bought drugs was raided by a federal police operation. Complying, Cuevas got on the ground. However, the person selling the substances planted the drugs next to Cuevas and used her as a scapegoat.

=== Wrongful conviction ===
Cuevas spent ten years in jail, falsely accused of drug trafficking, with no due process. Violence against her continued during her time at Penitenciaria Santa Martha. She was sexually and physically abused because of her gender expression. During her sentence, she looked after her peers with HIV who were neglected because of their gender identities. She was imprisoned for over ten years and released after her innocence had been proven.

=== Paola Buenrostro ===
On September 30, 2016, Cuevas lost her close friend and fellow sex worker, Paola Buenrostro. Paola, who had entered the car of a client, yelled out to Cuevas, crying for help. As Cuevas ran out towards the car, she heard two gunshots and saw the man moving Paola's body to the passenger seat. Aiming the gun towards her, he pulled the trigger but it jammed. The man was detained but was released at the end of the trial. Cuevas then vowed to work for the liberation and happiness of trans women in Mexico. Five years following the death of Paola Buenrostro, the Attorney General's Office of Mexico City publicly offered an apology to Paola and Cuevas and admitted that a proper investigation was not conducted. They also acknowledged that they did not respect her gender identity, constantly deadnaming her in the process and refusing to recognize the nature of the crime against her. With Fuentes's guidance, the Capital Prosecutor's office worked to compile a document that would satisfy the recommendation to assist trans victims.

== Activism ==
From 2016 to January 2022, over 145 cases of murder against trans women were committed in Mexico. In 2021, Mexico was the second deadliest country for trans people. 58% of the victims worldwide were sex workers. Following the murder of her friend and the attempt after her own life, Fuentes continues to support other trans women, advocates for sex workers, and fights for the legal recognition of transfemicide.

=== Casa de las Muñecas Tiresias ===
In 2019, Fuentes founded the Asociación Civil Casa de las Muñecas Tiresias (Tiresias Doll House Civil Association). Casa de las Muñecas offers multiple services including HIV prevention and treatment programs, safety escorting, health services, funeral services for victims of hate crimes, and support when filing claims of discrimination. They assist people with low-income, members of the LGBTQ+ community, sex workers, houseless people, substance users, and anyone else who may be in need of these services. Of the efforts at the organization, she says "Our greatest revenge will be to be happy" (translated from "Nuestra mayor venganza será ser felicies").

=== La Casa Hogar Paola Buenrostro ===
In December 2019, Cuevas received the rights to a property that would be established as La Casa Hogar Paola Buenrostro. Named after her late friend who was murdered only for being a transgender woman, Kenya opened this refuge which is the first in Mexico to shelter and provide assistance to trans women. It opened its services in January 2020 and continues to serve Mexican and migrant trans women.

== Recognition and awards ==
In 2021 she was awarded the Forjadores de México Award by the Fundación Cultural Forjadores de México for her career in the defense of human rights.
