= List of Mexican submissions for the Academy Award for Best International Feature Film =

Best International Feature Film submissions from Mexico

Highlights
- Debut: 1957
- Submissions: 59
- Nominations: 9
- Oscar winners: 1

Mexico has submitted films for the Academy Award for Best International Feature Film (Note: The category was previously named the Academy Award for Best Foreign Language Film, but this was changed to the Academy Award for Best International Feature Film in April 2019, after the Academy deemed the word "Foreign" to be outdated.) since 1957. The award is handed out annually by the United States Academy of Motion Picture Arts and Sciences to a feature-length motion picture produced outside the United States that contains primarily non-English dialogue. The award was not created until the 1956 Academy Awards, in which a competitive Academy Award of Merit, known as the Best Foreign Language Film Award, was created for non-English speaking films, and has been given annually since.

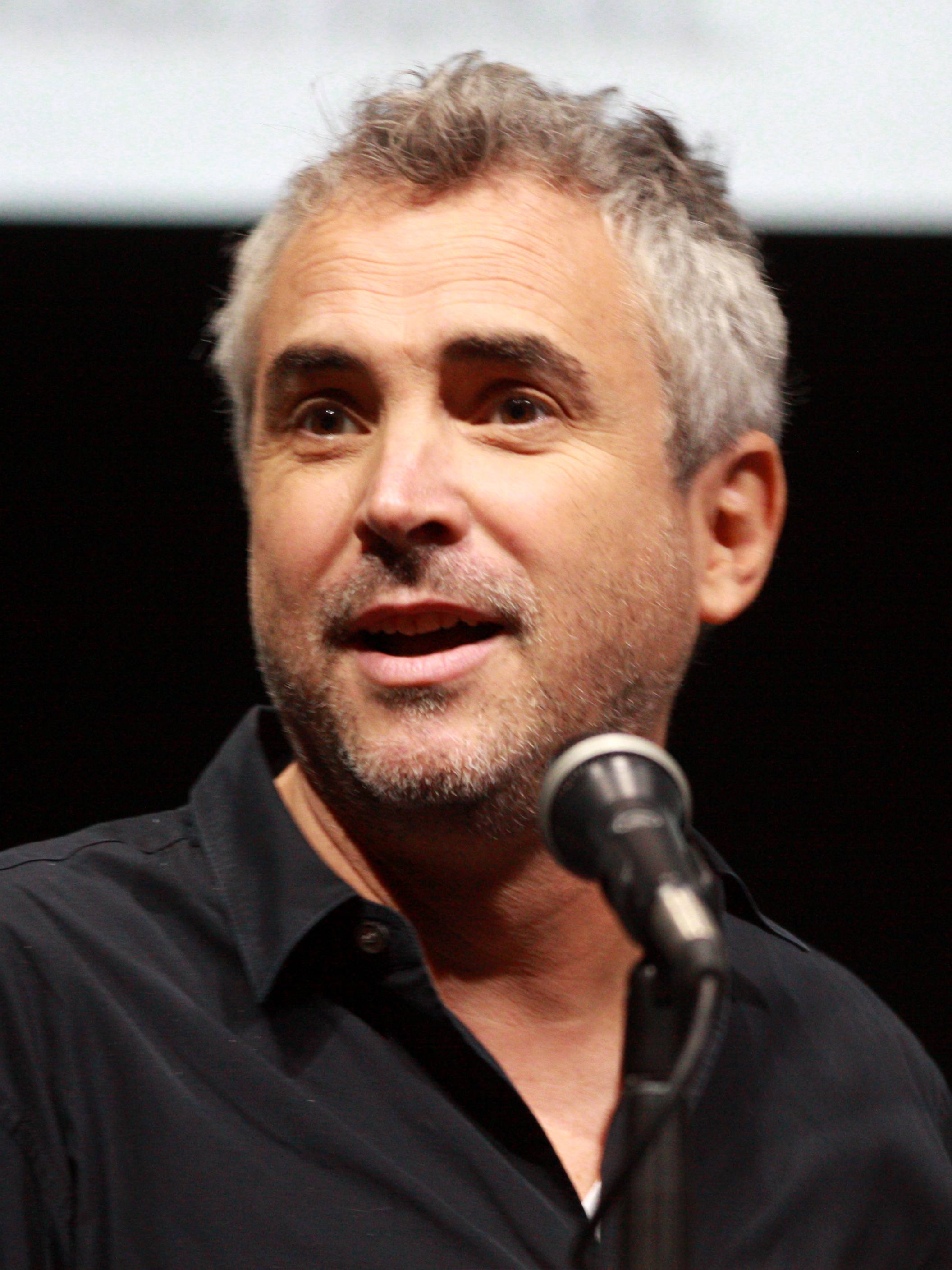
Alfonso Cuarón directed Roma (2018), Mexico's first film to win the award.

As of 2026, Mexico has been nominated nine times, winning once for Roma (2018).

== Submissions ==
The Academy of Motion Picture Arts and Sciences has invited the film industries of various countries to submit their best film for the Academy Award for Best International Feature Film since 1956. The International Feature Film Committee oversees the process and reviews all the submitted films. Following this, they vote via secret ballot to determine the five nominees for the award.

The Mexican nominee is selected annually by the Academia Mexicana de Artes y Ciencias Cinematográficas. The selection committee holds separate votes to decide which film will represent the country in the Academy Awards and in the Goya Awards.

Mexico has been nominated nine times, including Macario (1960), The Important Man (1961), The Pearl of Tlayucan (1962), Letters from Marusia (1975), Amores perros (2000), The Crime of Padre Amaro (2002), Pan's Labyrinth (2006), and Biutiful (2010).

Pan's Labyrinth (2006), directed by Guillermo del Toro, won Best Art Direction, Best Cinematography, and Best Makeup, at the 79th Academy Awards, alongside other two nominations.

Roma (2018), directed by Alfonso Cuarón, was the country first winner. It also won Best Cinematography and Best Director (both for Cuarón), while was also nominated for Best Picture (the first Latin American film to ever be nominated in this category), Best Actress for Yalitza Aparicio, Best Supporting Actress for Marina de Tavira, Best Production Design, Best Sound Editing and Best Sound Mixing.

Tear This Heart Out (2008), I'm No Longer Here (2020), Prayers for the Stolen (2021), Bardo, False Chronicle of a Handful of Truths (2022), and Tótem (2023), all advanced to the December shortlists, but were not nominated.

Arturo Ripstein has represented Mexico five times, more than any other Mexican filmmaker, although he has never received a nomination. While Alejandro González Iñárritu was nominated twice, and shortlisted once.

All the films submitted are primary in Spanish. Below is a list of the films that have been submitted by Mexico for review by the Academy for the award by year and the respective Academy Awards ceremony.

Year (Ceremony)	Film title used in nomination	Original title	Language(s)	Director	Result
1957 (30th)	Torero!		Spanish	Carlos Velo	Not nominated
1959 (32nd)	Nazarín		Spanish	Luis Buñuel	Not nominated
1960 (33rd)	Macario		Spanish	Roberto Gavaldón	Nominated
1961 (34th)	The Important Man	Ánimas Trujano (El hombre importante)	Spanish	Ismael Rodríguez	Nominated
1962 (35th)	The Pearl of Tlayucan	Tlayucan	Spanish	Luis Alcoriza	Nominated
1963 (36th)	The Paper Man	El hombre de papel	Spanish, Italian	Ismael Rodríguez	Not nominated
1965 (38th)	Always Farther Away	Tarahumara (Cada vez más lejos)	Spanish, Rarámuri	Luis Alcoriza	Not nominated
1966 (39th)	Black Wind	Viento Negro	Spanish	Servando González	Not nominated
1967 (40th)	The Adolescents	Los Adolescentes	Spanish	Abel Salazar	Not nominated
1971 (44th)	El Topo		Spanish	Alejandro Jodorowsky	Not nominated
1973 (46th)	Reed: Insurgent Mexico	Reed, México insurgente	Spanish	Paul Leduc	Not nominated
1974 (47th)	Calzonzin Inspector		Spanish	Alfonso Arau	Not nominated
1975 (48th)	Letters from Marusia	Actas de Marusia	Spanish	Miguel Littín	Nominated
1976 (49th)	Length of War	Longitud de guerra	Spanish	Gonzalo Martínez Ortega	Not nominated
1977 (50th)	Pafnucio Santo		Spanish	Rafael Corkidi	Not nominated
1978 (51st)	A Limitless Place	El Lugar sin límites	Spanish	Arturo Ripstein	Not nominated
1981 (54th)	Mojado Power		Spanish	Alfonso Arau	Not nominated
1983 (56th)	Eréndira		Spanish, Portuguese	Ruy Guerra	Not nominated
1985 (58th)	Frida Still Life	Frida, naturaleza viva	Spanish	Paul Leduc	Not nominated
1986 (59th)	The Realm of Fortune	El Imperio de la fortuna	Spanish	Arturo Ripstein	Not nominated
1987 (60th)	Life Is Most Important	Lo Que Importa es Vivir	Spanish	Luis Alcoriza	Not nominated
1988 (61st)	The Last Tunnel	El Último túnel	Spanish, Rarámuri	Servando González	Not nominated
1990 (63rd)	Cabeza de Vaca		Spanish, Latin	Nicolás Echevarría	Not nominated
1991 (64th)	Homework	La Tarea	Spanish	Jaime Humberto Hermosillo	Not nominated
1992 (65th)	Like Water for Chocolate	Como agua para chocolate	Spanish, English	Alfonso Arau	Not nominated
1993 (66th)	Chronos	Cronos	Spanish, English	Guillermo del Toro	Not nominated
1994 (67th)	The Beginning and the End	Principio y fin	Spanish	Arturo Ripstein	Not nominated
1995 (68th)	Midaq Alley	El callejón de los milagros	Spanish	Jorge Fons	Not nominated
1996 (69th)	Between Pancho Villa and a Naked Woman	Entre Pancho Villa y una mujer desnuda	Spanish	Sabina Berman and Isabelle Tardán	Not nominated
1997 (70th)	Deep Crimson	Profundo carmesí	Spanish	Arturo Ripstein	Not nominated
1998 (71st)	Un embrujo		Spanish	Carlos Carrera	Not nominated
1999 (72nd)	No One Writes to the Colonel	El Coronel no tiene quien le escriba	Spanish	Arturo Ripstein	Not nominated
2000 (73rd)	Amores perros		Spanish	Alejandro González Iñárritu	Nominated
2001 (74th)	Violet Perfume: No One Is Listening	Perfume de violetas, nadie te oye	Spanish	Maryse Sistach	Not nominated
2002 (75th)	The Crime of Padre Amaro	El crimen del Padre Amaro	Spanish	Carlos Carrera	Nominated
2003 (76th)	Aro Tolbukhin		Spanish, Hungarian, Catalan	Isaac Pierre Racine, Agustí Villaronga and Lydia Zimmermann	Not nominated
2004 (77th)	Innocent Voices	Voces inocentes	Spanish	Luis Mandoki	Not nominated
2005 (78th)	Al otro lado		Spanish	Gustavo Loza	Not nominated
2006 (79th)	Pan's Labyrinth	El laberinto del fauno	Spanish	Guillermo del Toro	Nominated
2007 (80th)	Silent Light	Luz silenciosa	Plautdietsch	Carlos Reygadas	Not nominated
2008 (81st)	Tear This Heart Out	Arráncame La Vida	Spanish	Roberto Sneider	Made shortlist
2009 (82nd)	Backyard	El Traspatio	Spanish, Tzotzil, English	Carlos Carrera	Not nominated
2010 (83rd)	Biutiful		Spanish, Mandarin, Wolof	Alejandro González Iñárritu	Nominated
2011 (84th)	Miss Bala		Spanish, English	Gerardo Naranjo	Not nominated
2012 (85th)	After Lucia	Después de Lucía	Spanish	Michel Franco	Not nominated
2013 (86th)	Heli		Spanish	Amat Escalante	Not nominated
2014 (87th)	Cantinflas		Spanish, English	Sebastian del Amo	Not nominated
2015 (88th)	600 Miles	600 Millas	Spanish, English	Gabriel Ripstein	Not nominated
2016 (89th)	Desierto		Spanish, English	Jonás Cuarón	Not nominated
2017 (90th)	Tempestad		Spanish	Tatiana Huezo	Not nominated
2018 (91st)	Roma		Spanish, Mixtec, English, Japanese, German, French, Norwegian	Alfonso Cuarón	Won Academy Award
2019 (92nd)	The Chambermaid	La camarista	Spanish, French	Lila Avilés	Not nominated
2020 (93rd)	I'm No Longer Here	Ya no estoy aquí	Spanish, English, Mandarin	Fernando Frías de la Parra	Made shortlist
2021 (94th)	Prayers for the Stolen	Noche de fuego	Spanish	Tatiana Huezo	Made shortlist
2022 (95th)	Bardo, False Chronicle of a Handful of Truths	Bardo, falsa crónica de unas cuantas verdades	Spanish, English	Alejandro González Iñárritu	Made shortlist
2023 (96th)	Tótem		Spanish	Lila Avilés	Made shortlist
2024 (97th)	Sujo		Spanish	Astrid Rondero and Fernanda Valadez	Not nominated
2025 (98th)	We Shall Not Be Moved	No nos moverán	Spanish	Pierre Saint-Martin	Not nominated
2026 (98th)	On the Road	En el camino	Spanish	David Pablos	Pending

== Shortlisted Films ==
Every year since 2007, Mexico has announced a list of finalists or eligible films that varied in number over the years (from 5 to 20 films) before announcing its official Oscar nominee. The following films have been shortlisted by the Mexican Academy of Cinematographic Arts and Sciences:

Year	Films
2007	Bad Habits · Eréndira Ikikunari · Never on Sunday · Under the Same Moon
2008	Burn the Bridges · Cochochi · Cumbia Connection · Déficit · Familia tortuga · Lake Tahoe · Nonna's Trip · Two Embraces · Used Parts · The Zone
2009	The Bastards · The Desert Within · I'm Gonna Explode · The Inheritors · Nora's Will · Rudo y Cursi · Under the Salt
2010	Abel · Alamar · The Attempt Dossier · Chicogrande · Daniel & Ana · The Good Herbs · Meet the Head of Juan Pérez · Northless · Vaho
2011	180° · Bitten Bullet · Days of Grace · Flowers in the Desert · Middle of the World · One Long Wall for Cecilia · Round Trip · Saint John's Dance · Siete instantes · We Are What We Are
2012	Between Us · Colosio: El asesinato · The Fantastic World of Juan Orol · Pastorela · Post Tenebras Lux · The Tiniest Place
2013	The Amazing Catfish · Amorous Pancho Villa · La cebra · Cinco de Mayo: The Battle · The Crazy Machine · The Dream of Lu · The Golden Dream · Instructions Not Included · The Precocious and Brief Life of Sabina Rivas · The Prize · Tlatelolco, verano del 68 · Tooth for a Tooth · She Doesn't Want to Sleep Alone · The Walls Talk
2014	Disrupted · Eufrosina's Revolution · González: falsos profetas · Güeros · Guten Tag, Ramón · H2Omx · The Incident · Inercia · The Last Call · My Friend Bety · My Universe in Lower Case · Orphans · Paradise · The Perfect Dictatorship · Perfect Obedience · Purgatorio: A Journey into the Heart of the Border · The Tears · Volando bajo · What do Goats Dream? · Workers
2015	Echo of the Mountain · Eddie Reynolds y los ángeles de acero · Elvira I Will Give You My Life But I'm Using It · Four Moons · Gloria · Happy Times · Lonely Stars · One for the Road · Perpetual Sadness · A Separate Wind · The Thin Yellow Line · Time Suspended · Una última y nos vamos
2016	The 4th Company · 7:19 · The Alien · Being or Not Being · Carmin Tropical · The Chosen Ones · The Dead · Epitaph · El Jeremías · Made in Bangkok · El más buscado · A Monster with a Thousand Heads · Panamerican Machinery · We Are Mari Pepa · You're Killing Me Susana
2017	All of Me · April's Daughters · Beauties of the Night · Bleak Street · The Dance of the Memory · I Dream in Another Language · Loneliness Square · The Man Who Saw Too Much · Nocturne · The Pleasure Is Mine · Purasangre · The Untamed · Warehoused · We Are the Flesh
2018	The Angel in the Clock · The Bouquiniste · El club de los insomnes · The Darkness · Devil's Freedom · The Eternal Feminine · Everything Else · The Gaze of the Sea · Museum · The Night Guard · Tigers Are Not Afraid · Time Share
2019	Belzebuth · Chicuarotes · Eight Out of Ten · Esmeralda's Twilight · The Good Girls · The Mongolian Conspiracy · Olimpia · Ready to Mingle · This Is Tomas
2020	Guie'dani's Navel · I Carry You with Me · New Order · This Is Not Berlin · Workforce
2021	A Cop Movie · Devil Between the Legs · Identifying Features · Los lobos · Tragic Jungle
2022	~~The Box~~ · The Hole in the Fence · Nudo Mixteco · Presencias
2023	The Great Seduction · Huesera: The Bone Woman · Noise · ¡Que viva México! · Where the Tracks End
2024	All the Silence · Bad Actor · Disappear Completely · Human Resources · I Don't Want to Be Dust · Pedro Páramo · Valentina or the Serenity
2025	1938: When Mexico Recovered Its Oil · Concerto for Other Hands · Corina · Cracked · Dead Man's Switch · Fine Young Men · The Follies · I Am Frankelda · Rain
2026	Ashes · Campeón Gabacho · A Child of My Own · Crocodiles · The Devil Smokes (and Saves the Burnt Matches in the Same Box) · Don't Leave the Kids Alone · Flamingos: Life After the Meteorite · Flies · The Garden We Dreamed · Hombre al agua · The Mutations · Oca · Over the Waves · Perpetual Adolescent · The Reserve · Sad Girlz

== See also ==
- List of Academy Award winners and nominees for Best International Feature Film
- List of Academy Award-winning foreign language films
