= 59th Ariel Awards =

2017 Mexican film awards

- Date: July 11, 2017
- Site: Palacio de Bellas Artes; Mexico City, Mexico
- Directed by: Daniel Giménez Cacho

Highlights
- Best Picture: La 4ª Compañía
- Most awards: La 4ª Compañía (10)
- Most nominations: La 4ª Compañía (20)

Television coverage
- Network: Canal 22

The 59th Ariel Awards ceremony, organized by the Mexican Academy of Film Arts and Sciences (AMACC) took place on July 11, 2017, at the Palacio de Bellas Artes in Mexico City. During the ceremony, AMACC presented the Ariel Award in 27 categories honoring films released in 2016. The ceremony will be televised in Mexico by Canal 22.

La 4ª Compañía was the most awarded film with 10 awards including Best Picture. Tatiana Huezo became the first female director to receive the Best Director award, for the documentary feature Tempestad, which also received three awards. Almacenados received three accolades, for Best Actor, Supporting Actor, and Adapted Screenplay; while La Caridad earned two awards for Best Actress and Best Supporting Actress. Art designer Lucero Isaac and actress Isela Vega received the Golden Ariel for their outstanding artistic career.

== Background ==
The Mexican Academy of Film Arts and Sciences (AMAAC) announced that films released in Mexico from January 1 through September 30 should register online for award consideration at the Ariel Awards' official website during the month of October 2016; films released from October 1 to December 31, could register at the same website from December 2016 to January 15, 2017. It was also revealed that the Academy reinstated for the 59th ceremony two former categories, Actor and Actress in a Minor Role, that will be awarded to a performer that "has a smaller participation than a lead protagonist or a co-star and is not the narrative focus but their performance is relevant to the plot. Their performance can be limited to a single sequence."

At the press conference held on May 3, 2017 to announce the 2017 Ariel Award nominees, AMAAC Secretary Everardo González informed that 131 films were submitted for consideration, including 11 animated short films, 10 documentary short subject films, 45 live action short films, 18 documentary features, 37 feature films, and 10 Iberoamerican feature films. He also announced that the award ceremony would be held at the Palacio de Bellas Artes in Mexico City, and will be dedicated to cinematography in order to celebrate the 70th anniversary of the first Ariel Awards. This year the nominees were selected by 174 Academy members.

Actors Karina Gidi and Juan Carlos Colombo announced the nominees which included two documentary features nominated for Best Picture, Bellas de Noche, directed by María José Cuevas and Tempestad, by Tatiana Huezo, with both films also being nominated for Best Documentary Feature. La 4ª Compañía is the most nominated film, with 20 nominations, including Best Picture, Best Director, Best First Feature Film, and seven acting nominations in the Best Actor, Best Supporting Actor and Actor in a Minor Role, categories. Art director Lucero Isaac and Mexican actress Isela Vega received the Golden Ariel to recognize their artistic career.

On June 22, 2017, the President of the AMACC, Dolores Heredia, announced that the award ceremony would go on despite a 77% cut to the academy's budget. "Let us make use of our imagination and creativity to have a dignified and solemn ceremony," Heredia declared. The ceremony will be produced by actor Daniel Giménez Cacho and televised by Canal 22, since the academy had several problems with Canal Once the previous year.

=== Awards ===
The following list includes nominees and winners which are first and highlighted with boldface.

**Best Picture**: **La 4ª Compañía – Pulsación Creadora Films, Fondo de Inversión y Estímulos al Cine (FIDECINE), Alebrije Cine y Video, Arte Mecánica Producciones, Astronauta Producciones, Sabor Para Llevar, Renta Imagen, Estudios Churubusco Azteca, Terminal Films, Polar Studio, and Metacube Tecnología y Entretenimiento**; Bellas de Noche – Cinepantera and Detalle Films; Desde Allá – Factor RH, Lucía Films, and Malandro Films; Desierto – Esperanto Kino, Ítaca Films, Orange Studio, and CG Cinema; El Sueño del Mara'akame – Fondo para la Producción Cinematográfica de Calidad (FOPROCINE) and Centro Universitario de Estudios Cinematográficos (CUEC); Me Estás Matando Susana – Cuevano Films; Tempestad – Pimienta Films, Cactus Films, and Terminal	**Best Director**: **Tatiana Huezo – Tempestad**; Mitzi Vanessa Arreola and Amir Galván – La 4ª Compañía; Jonás Cuarón – Desierto; Federico Cecchetti – El Sueño del Mara'akame; Roberto Sneider – Me Estás Matando Susana
**Best Actor**: **Adrián Ladrón – La 4ª Compañía as Zambrano**; **José Carlos Ruiz – Almacenados as Lino**; Gael García Bernal – Me Estás Matando Susana as Eligio; Danny Glover – Mr. Pig as Ambrose; Noé Hernández – Tenemos la Carne as Mariano	**Best Actress**: **Verónica Langer – La Caridad as Angélica**; Adriana Barraza – Todo lo Demás as Flor; Ludwika Paleta – Rumbos Paralelos as Gaby; Maya Rudolph – Mr. Pig as Eunice; Claudia Sainte-Luce – La Caja Vacía as Jazmín
**Best Supporting Actor**: **Hoze Meléndez – Almacenados as Nin**; Diego Cataño – Desierto as Mechas; Mauricio Isaac – Distancias Cortas as Ramón; Antonio Parra – El Sueño del Mara'akame as Papá / Mara'akame; Darío T. Pie – La 4ª Compañía as Florecita; Manuel Ojeda – La 4ª Compañía as Chaparro; Carlos Valencia – La 4ª Compañía as El Tripas	**Best Supporting Actress**: **Adriana Paz – La Caridad as Eva**; Carmen Beato – Los Parecidos as Gertrudis; Xochiquetzal Rodríguez – La Carga as Esposa de Coyolli; Tiaré Scanda – El Cumple de la Abuela as Diana; Mariana Treviño – La vida inmoral de la pareja ideal as Beatríz
**Best Actor in a Minor Role**: **Hernán Mendoza** – **La 4ª Compañía as Palafox**; Andoni Gracia – La 4ª Compañía as Combate; Gabino Rodríguez – La 4ª Compañía as Quinto; Gerardo Taracena – La Carga as Itzmin; Harold Torres – La Carga as Coyolli	**Best Actress in a Minor Role**: **Martha Claudia Moreno** – **Distancias Cortas as Rosaura**; Angélica Aragón – Mr. Pig as Chila; Arcelia Ramírez – Jirón de Niebla as Irasema; Norma Reyna – La Carga as Citlalli; Mariana Treviño – El Sueño del Mara'akame as Prostitute #1
**Breakthrough Male Performance**: **Paco de la Fuente – El Alien y Yo as Pepe El Alien**; Luciano Bautista – El Sueño del Mara'akame as Niereme; Luis Carlos Ortega – Distancias Cortas as Fede; Luis Silva – Desde Allá as Elder; Aliocha Sotnikoff Ramos – Las Tinieblas as Argel	**Breakthrough Female Performance**: **María Evoli – Tenemos la Carne as Fauna**; Natasha Dupeyrón – Treintona, Soltera y Fantástica as Regina; Gloria Carina López – La Casa Más Grande del Mundo as Rocío; Camila Robertson Glennie – Las Tinieblas as Luciana; Irene Ramírez – Panamerican Machinery as Soledad
**Best Original Screenplay**: Panamerican Machinery **– Joaquín del Paso and Lucy Pawlak**; Desierto – Jonás Cuarón and Mateo García; Distancias Cortas – Itzel Lara; El Sueño del Mara'akame – Federico Cecchetti; La 4ª Compañía – Mitzi Vanessa Arreola; Tempestad – Tatiana Huezo	**Best Adapted Screenplay**: **Almacenados – David Desola based on his play**; El Alien y Yo – Fernando del Razo, Jesús Magaña, and Emiliano Flores from El Alien Agropecuario by Carlos Velázquez; Jirón de Niebla – Julio César Estrada, Gustavo Moheno, and Ángel Pulido from the film by Carlos Enrique Taboada; Las Aparicio – Leticia López, Verónica Bellver, Natassja Ybarra, and Lucía Carreras from the TV series by Leticia López and Verónica Bellver; Me Estás Matando Susana – Luis Cámara and Roberto Sneider from Ciudades Desiertas by José Agustín
**Best Ibero-American Film**: **El Ciudadano Ilustre (Argentina) – Gastón Duprat & Mariano Cohn**; **Una Segunda Madre (Brazil) – Anna Muylaert**; Anna (Colombia) – Jacques Toulemonde; Sin Muertos No Hay Carnaval (Ecuador) – Sebastián Cordero; Tarde Para la Ira (Spain) – Raúl Arévalo	**Best First Feature Film**: **El Sueño del Mara'akame – Federico Cecchetti**; Bellas de Noche – María José Cuevas; Desde Allá – Lorenzo Vigas; Distancias Cortas – Alejandro Guzmán; La 4ª Compañía – Mitzi Vanessa Arreola and Amir Galván; Panamerican Machinery – Joaquín del Paso
**Best Documentary Feature**: **Tempestad – Tatiana Huezo**; Bellas de Noche – María José Cuevas; La Balada del Oppenheimer Park – Juan Manuel Sepúlveda; Somos Lengua – Kyzza Terrazas; The Weekend Sailor – Bernardo Arsuaga	**Best Documentary Short Subject**: **Aurelia y Pedro – José Permar and Omar Robles**; 13,500 Volts – Mónica Blumen; Club Amazonas – Roberto Fiesco; La Casa de los Lúpulos – Paula Hopf; Memorias del Table Dance – Silvana Lázaro; Semillas de Guamúchil – Carolina Corral
**Best Animated Short**: **Los Aeronautas – León Rodrigo Fernández**; Ascensión – Davy Giorgi and Samantha Pineda; Elena y las Sombras – César Gabriel Cepeda; Los Gatos – Víctor Alejandro Ríos; Taller de Corazones – León Rodrigo Fernández	**Best Original Score**: **El Sueño del Mara'akame – Emiliano Motta**; La 4ª Compañía – Ramiro del Real, Renato del Real, Takaakira "Taka" Goto, and Javier Umpierrez; Desierto – Yoann Lemoine; Las Tinieblas – Carlo Ayhllón; Tempestad – Leonardo Heiblum and Jacobo Lieberman
**Best Live Action Short**: **El Ocaso de Juan – Omar Deneb Juárez**; Australia – Rodrigo Ruiz; El Tigre y la Flor – Fabiola Denisse Quintero; Fisuras – Roberto Fiesco; Verde – Alonso Ruizpalacios	**Best Sound**: **La 4ª Compañía – Javier Umpierrez, Isabel Muñoz, Jaime Baksht, and Michelle Couttolenc**; **Tempestad – Federico González Jordán, Lena Esquenazi, and Carlos Cortés**; 7:19 – Christian Giraud and Pablo Lach; El Sueño del Mara'akame – Daniel Rojo and Alicia Segovia; Me Estás Matando Susana – Fernando Cámara, Stan Mak, Jaime Baksht, Steven Avila, Trip Brock, and Michelle Couttolenc
**Best Film Editing**: **La 4ª Compañía – Camilo Abadía, Mitzi Vanessa Arreola, and Francisco X. Rivera**; Bellas de Noche – Ximena Cuevas; Desierto – Jonás Cuarón; El Sueño del Mara'akame – Pierre Saint Martin Castellanos and Raúl Zendejas; Tempestad – Lucrecia Gutiérrez and Tatiana Huezo	**Best Art Direction**: **La 4ª Compañía – Jay Aroesty and Carlos Cosío**; 7:19 – Alejandro García; La Carga – Jay Aroesty; Las Tinieblas – Alisarine Ducolomb; Me Estás Matando Susana – Eugenio Caballero
**Best Cinematography**: **Tempestad – Ernesto Pardo**; Desierto – Damián García; Epitafio – Emiliano Fernández; La 4ª Compañía – Miguel López; Mr. Pig – Damián García	**Best Makeup**: **La 4ª Compañía – Carla Tinoco and Alfredo García**; 7:19 – Gerardo Muñoz; El Sueño del Mara'akame – Roberto Ortíz; La Carga – Felipe Salazar and Antón Garfias; Los Parecidos – Marco Hernández, Cristian Pérez, and Gerardo Muñoz
**Best Costume Design**: **La 4ª Compañía – Bertha Romero and José Guadalupe López**; Epitafio – Alisarine Ducolomb; El Sueño del Mara'akame – Xihuitl Mariana Gandía; La Carga – Adela Cortázar; Macho – Natalia Seligson, Juan de Dios Ramírez, Alberto Escamilla, and Gianfranco Reni	**Best Special Effects**: **La 4ª Compañía – Luis Eduardo Ambriz**; 7:19 – José Manuel Martínez; Desierto – José Manuel Martínez; KM 31–2 – Ricardo Arvizu Fernández and Ricardo Arvizu Solís; Tenemos la Carne – Adrián Durán
**Best Visual Effects**: **La 4ª Compañía – Ricardo Robles**; 7:19 – Omar Molina; Desierto – Anthony Lestramau; KM 31–2 – Rodrigo Echevarría and Eduardo Viladoms; Las Tinieblas – Gustavo Bellón, Benoit Manequinn, Andrés Palma, and David Camiro

== Multiple nominations and awards ==
The following films received multiple nominations:

Nominations	Film
20	La 4ª Compañía
12	El Sueño del Mara'akame
9	Desierto
8	Tempestad
7	La Carga
6	Me Estás Matando Susana
5	7:19
5	Las Tinieblas
4	Bellas de Noche
4	Distancias Cortas
4	Mr. Pig
3	Almacenados
3	Desde Allá
3	Maquinaria Panamericana
3	Tenemos la Carne
2	El Alien y Yo
2	Epitafio
2	KM 31–2
2	La Caridad
2	Los Parecidos

Films that received multiple awards:

Awards	Film
10	La 4ª Compañía
4	Tempestad
3	Almacenados
2	La Caridad
2	El Sueño del Mara'akame
