= Ariel Award for Best Supporting Actor =

Ariel Award category

- Country: Mexico
- Presented by: AMACC
- First award: 1947
- Currently held by: Mariano López Sosa, En El Camino (2026)
- Website: premioariel.com.mx

The Ariel Award for Best Supporting Actor (Spanish: Premio Ariel a Mejor Coactuación Masculina) is an award presented by the Academia Mexicana de Artes y Ciencias Cinematográficas (AMACC) in Mexico. It is given in honor of an actor who has delivered an outstanding performance in a supporting role while working within the Mexican film industry. In 1947, the 1st and 2nd Ariel Awards were held, with José Baviera and Fernando Soto winning for the films La Barraca and Campeón Sin Corona, respectively. With the exception of the years 1958 to 1971, when the Ariel Awards were suspended, the award has been given annually. Nominees and winners are determined by a committee formed every year consisting of academy members (active and honorary), previous winners and individuals with at least two Ariel nominations; the committee submit their votes through the official AMACC website.

Since its inception, the award has been given to 55 actors. Ernesto Gómez Cruz has received the most awards in this category with four Ariels. José Carlos Ruiz is the most nominated performer, with seven nominations which resulted in three wins. On two separate instances all the nominees in the category were selected from the same film; the first time in 1974, with Sergio Bustamante, Andrés García, and Alejandro Parodi being nominated for the film El Principio, with the award handed to Bustamante; the second time, in 1976, with Gómez Cruz, Eduardo López Rojas, and Claudio Obregón being nominated (and awarded) for their roles in the film Actas de Marusia. Rojo Grau was nominated twice in 1986, for his performances in the films El Escuadrón de la Muerte and Gavilán o Paloma, losing to José Carlos Ruiz for Toña Machetes. In 1996, Damián Alcázar and Jesús Ochoa tied for their work in the films El Anzuelo and Entre Pancho Villa y Una Mujer Desnuda, respectively.

Fifteen films have featured two or more nominated performances for Best Supporting Actor, Doña Perfecta (Carlos Navarro and Julio Villarreal), El Rebozo de Soledad (Carlos López Moctezuma and Domingo Soler), Las Tres Perfectas Casadas (José Elías Moreno and José María Linares), Cadena Perpetua (Ernesto Gómez Cruz and Narciso Busquets), El Callejón de los Milagros (Daniel Giménez Cacho and Esteban Soberanes), Por Si No Te Vuelvo a Ver (Max Kerlow and Justo Martínez), El Evangelio de las Maravillas (Bruno Bichir and Rafael Inclán), La Ley de Herodes (Pedro Armendáriz and Salvador Sánchez), Matando Cabos (Joaquín Cosío and Raúl Méndez), La Zona (Mario Zaragoza and Alan Chávez), El Infierno (Cosío and Gómez Cruz), Días de Gracia (Kristyan Ferrer and Zaragoza), Colosio: El Asesinato (Giménez Cacho and Dagoberto Gama), La Delgada Línea Amarilla (Cosío, Silverio Palacios and Gustavo Sánchez Parra), and La 4a Compañía (Manuel Ojeda, Dario T. Pie and Carlos Valencia); Navarro, López Moctezuma, Moreno, Gómez Cruz, Kerlow, Armendáriz, Zaragoza, Cosío (for El Infierno), Giménez Cacho (for Colosio: El Asesinato) won the award. As of the 2025 ceremony, Mariano López Sosa is the most recent winner in this category for his role in En El Camino.

== Winners and nominees ==
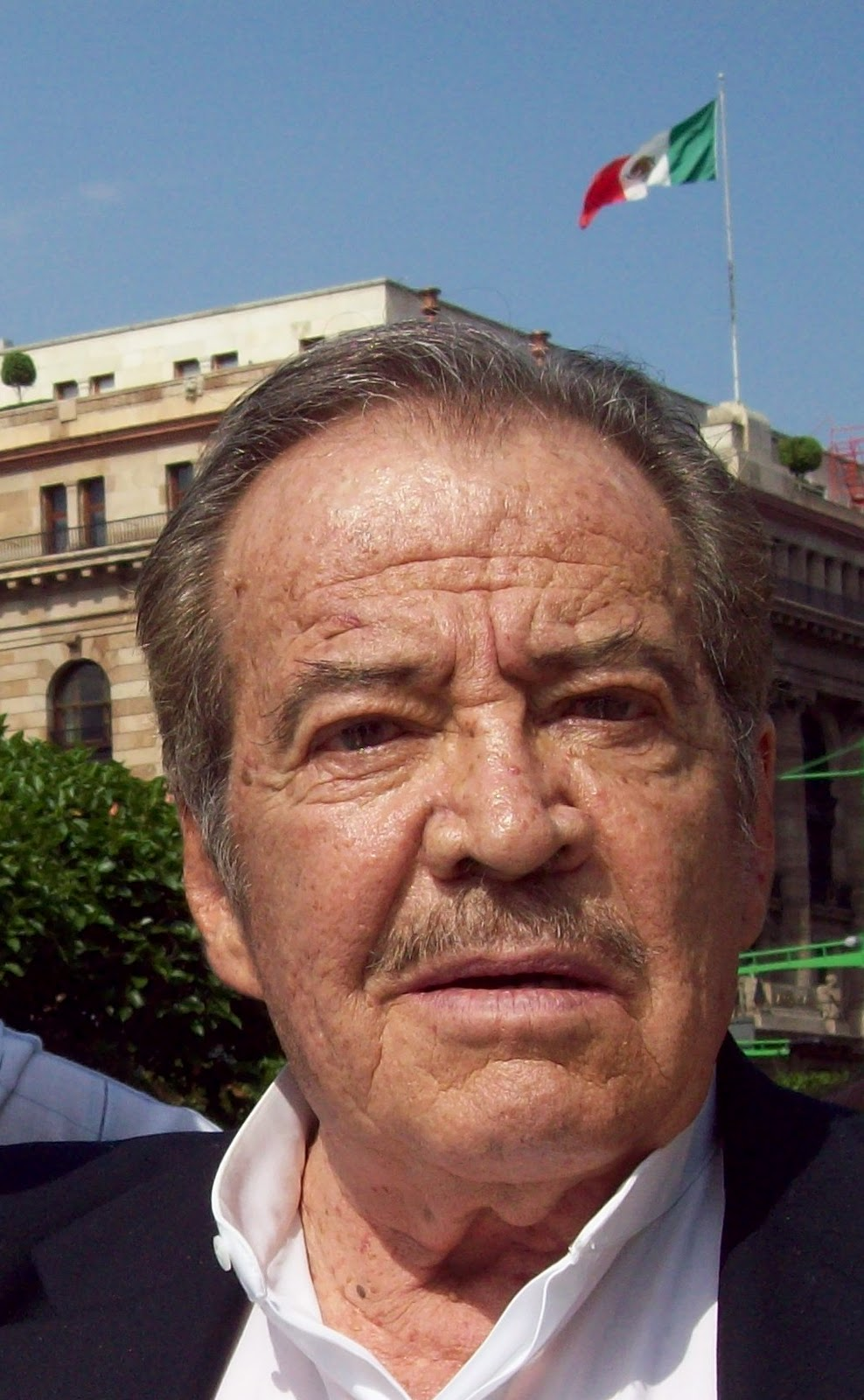
Claudio Obregón was nominated twice, winning for Actas de Marusia in 1976.

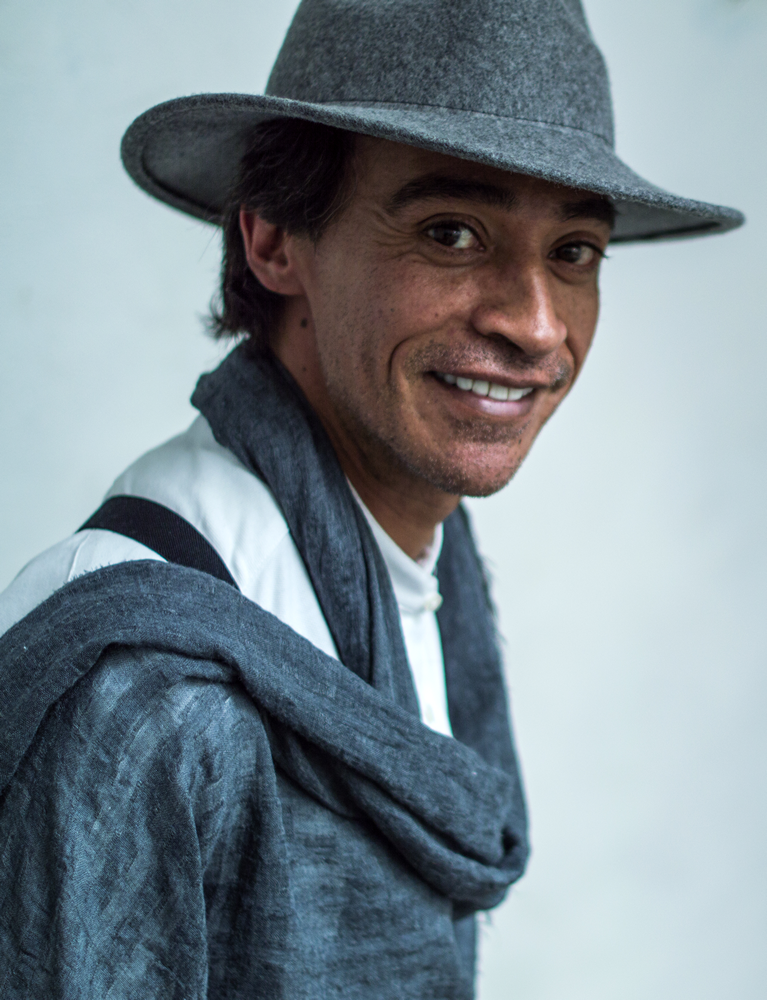
Roberto Sosa was nominated twice, winning for Lola in 1990.

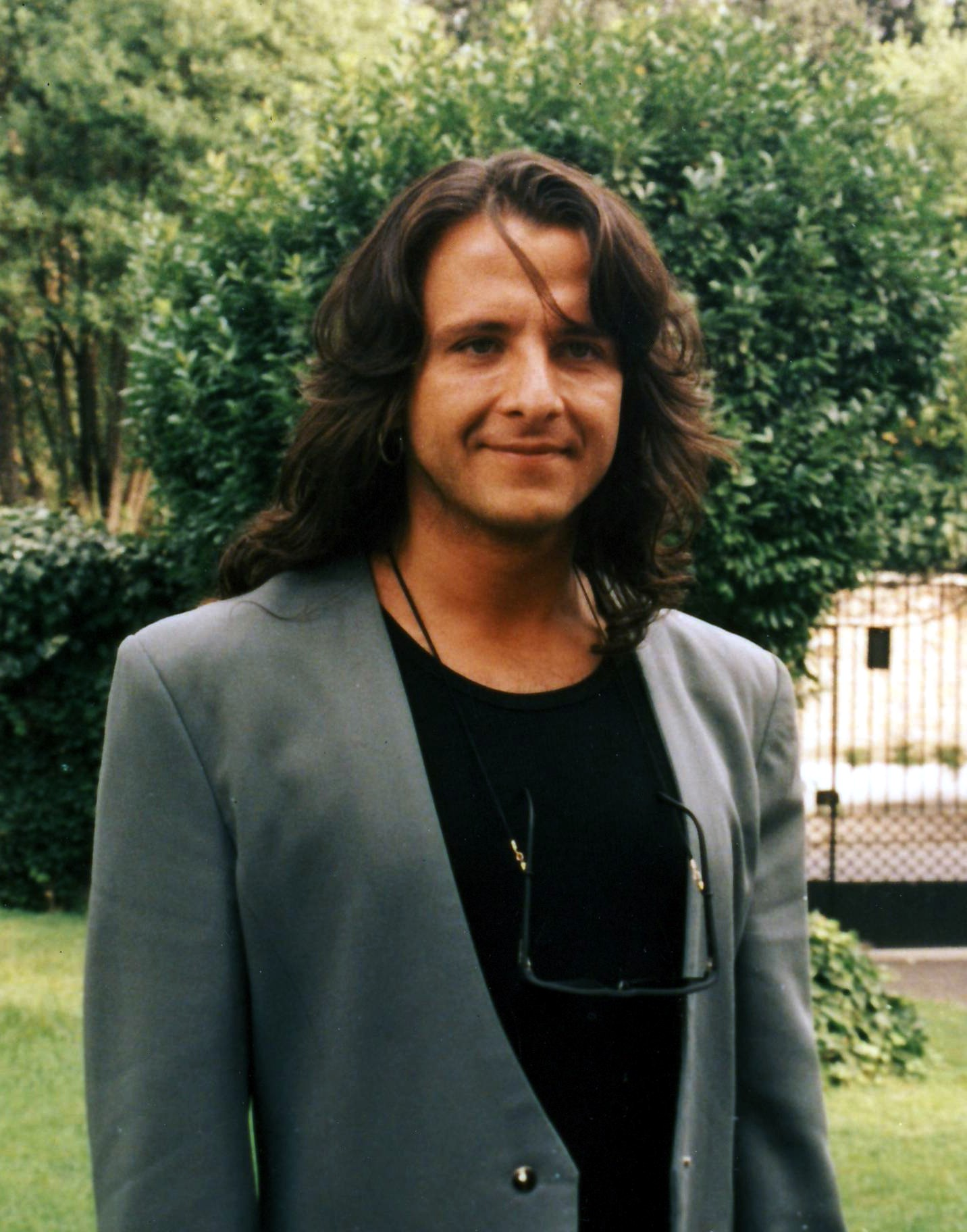
Eduardo Palomo won in 1990 for his role in La Mujer de Benjamín.

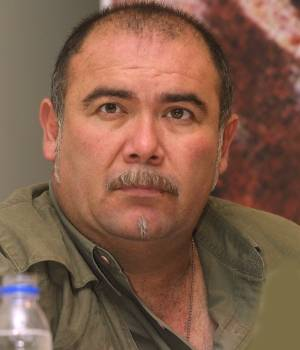
Jesús Ochoa won twice for Entre Pancho Villa y Una Mujer Desnuda (1996) and Bajo California, el Límite del Tiempo (1999).

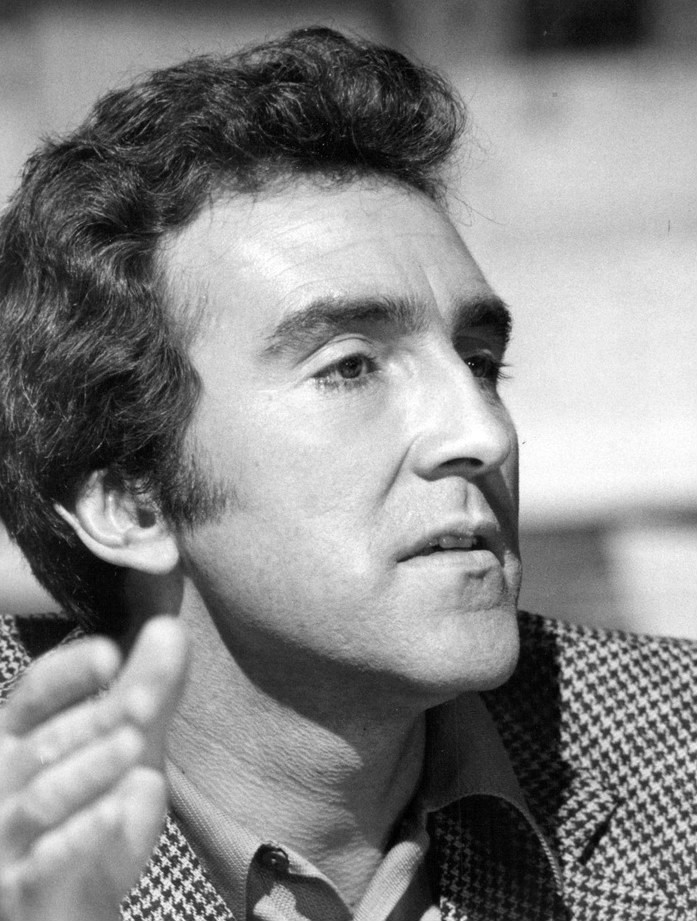
Pedro Armendáriz was nominated three times and won for La Ley de Herodes in 2000.

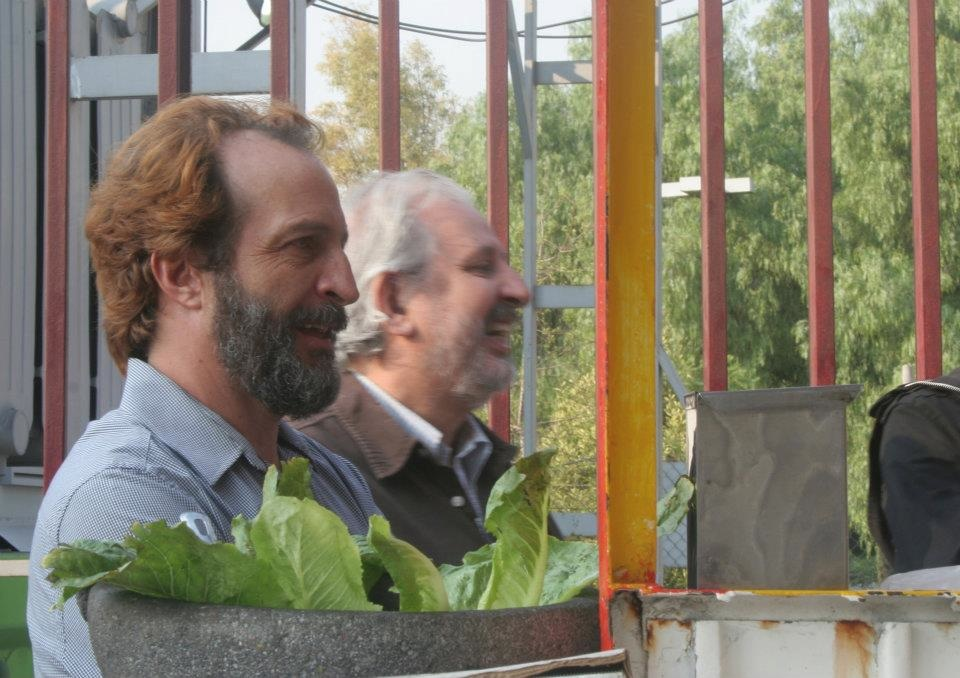
Daniel Giménez Cacho (left) was nominated three times and won twice for Nicotina (2004) and Colosio: El Asesinato (2013).

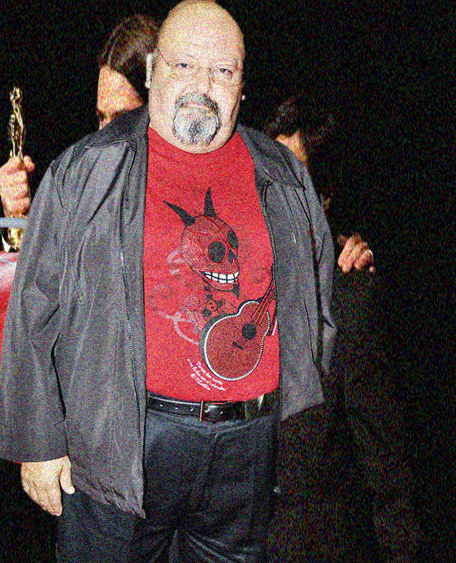
Carlos Cobos won twice for Conejo en la Luna (2005) and Pastorela (2012).

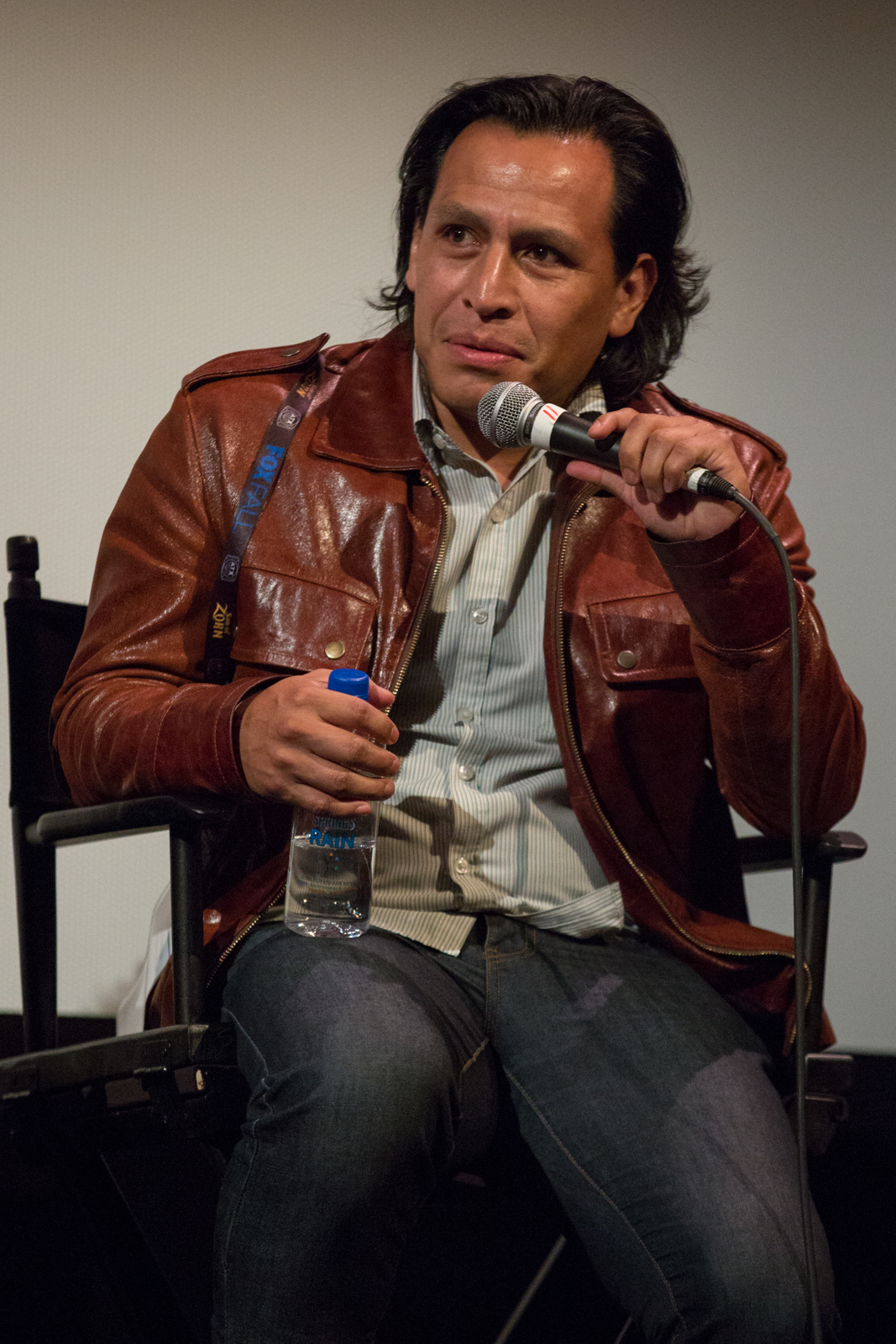
Gerardo Taracena won the award for El Violín in 2007.

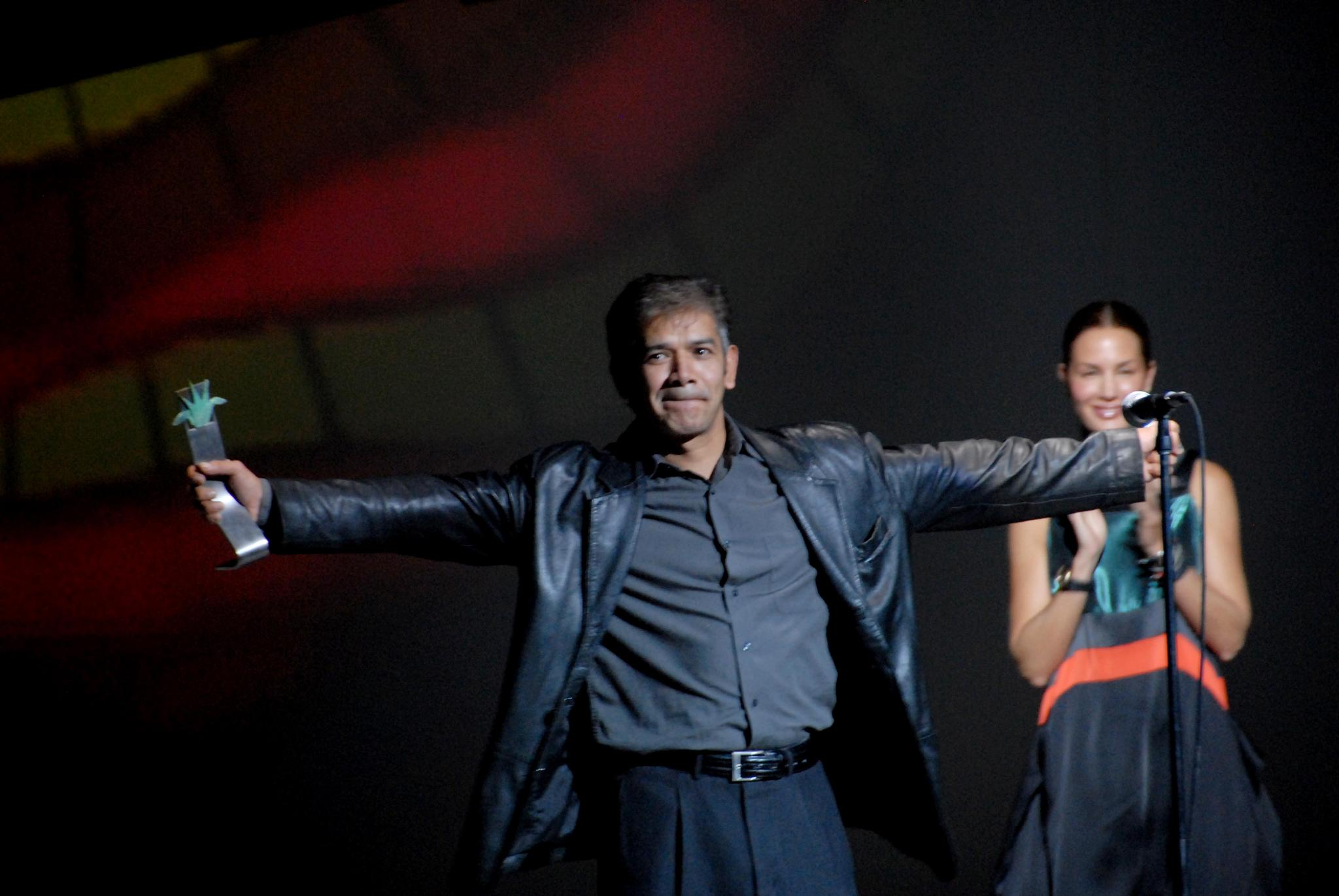
Mario Zaragoza won the award for La Zona in 2008.

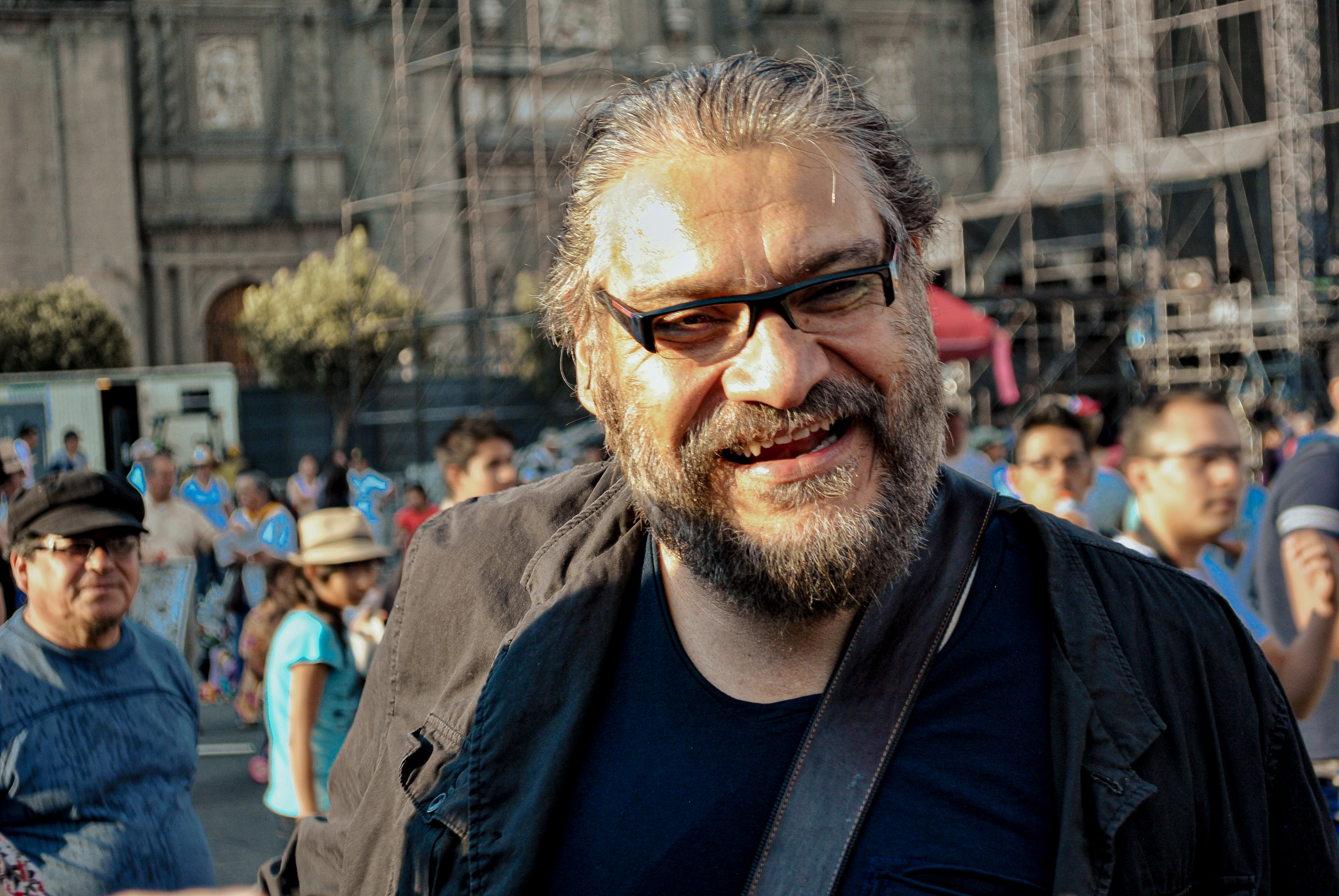
Joaquín Cosío was nominated three times and won for El Infierno in 2011.

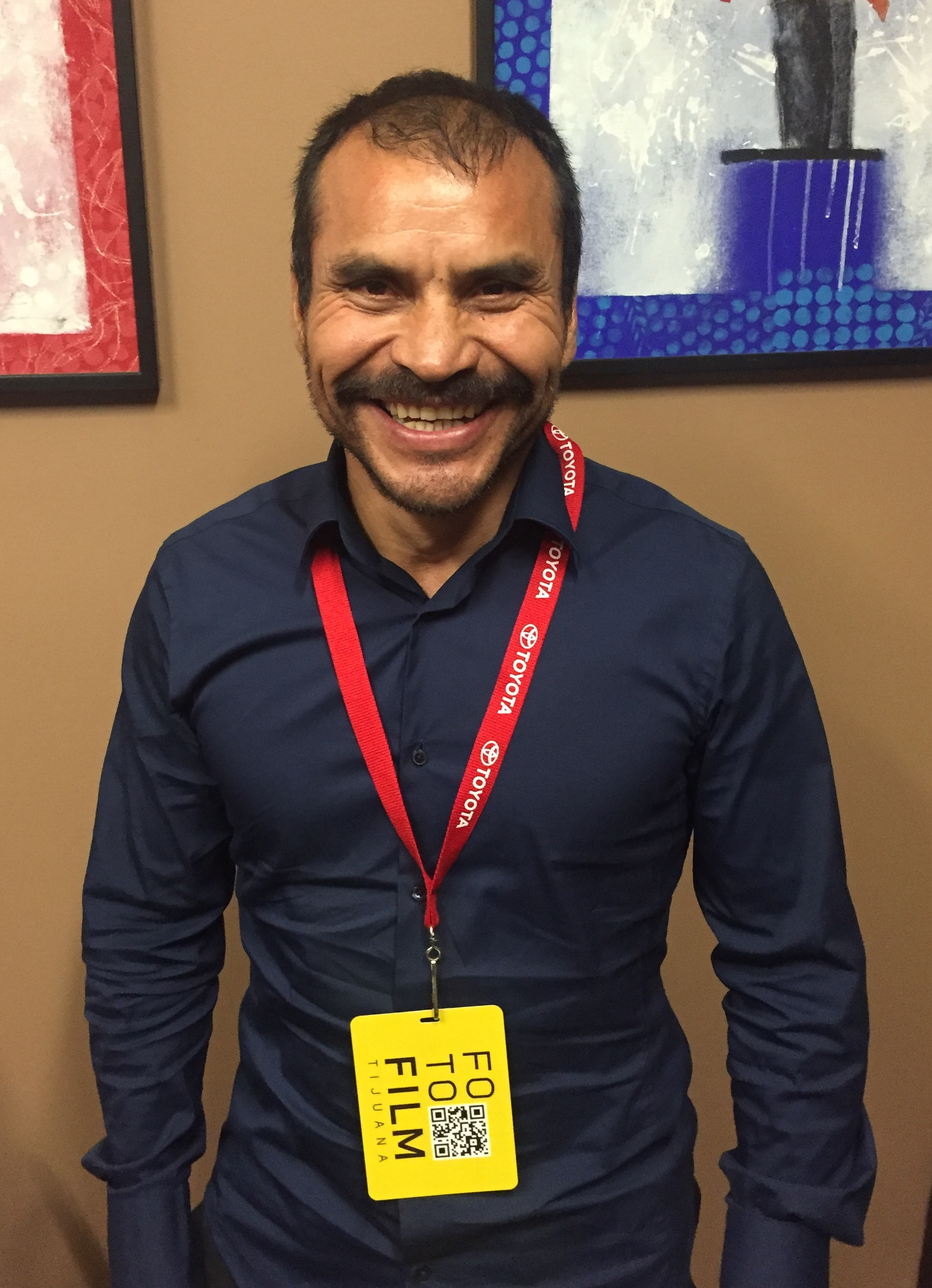
Noé Hernández won twice for La Tirisia (2015) and 600 Millas (2016).

Table key
‡	Indicates the winner

Year	Actor	Film	Ref.
1947 (1st)	José Baviera‡	La Barraca	
1947 (1st)	Antonio Badú	Me He de Comer Esa Tuna	
1947 (1st)	Carlos López Moctezuma	Canaima: El Dios del Mal	
1947 (2nd)	Fernando Soto‡	Campeón Sin Corona	
1947 (2nd)	Fortunio Bonanova	Pepita Jiménez	
1947 (2nd)	Víctor Junco	La Otra	
1948 (3rd)	Víctor Manuel Mendoza‡	Cuando Lloran los Valientes	
1948 (3rd)	Rafael Alcayde	Soledad	
1948 (3rd)	Rubén Rojo	Soledad	
1949 (4th)	Víctor Parra‡	El Muchacho Alegre	
1949 (4th)	Tito Junco	Que Dios Me Perdone	
1949 (4th)	Arturo Martínez	Juan Charrasqueado	
1950 (5th)	Víctor Parra‡	Ángeles del Arrabal	
1950 (5th)	Rodolfo Acosta	Salón México	
1950 (5th)	Andrés Soler	La Hija del Penal	
1951 (6th)	Joaquín Cordero‡	Las Dos Huerfanitas	
1951 (6th)	José María Linares	Doña Diabla	
1951 (6th)	Andrés Soler	No Desearás a la Mujer de Tu Hijo	
1952 (7th)	Carlos Navarro‡	Doña Perfecta	
1952 (7th)	Alberto Mariscal	Flor de Sangre	
1952 (7th)	Julio Villarreal	Doña Perfecta	
1953 (8th)	Carlos López Moctezuma‡	El Rebozo de Soledad	
1953 (8th)	Luis Aceves Castañeda	Subida al Cielo	
1953 (8th)	Domingo Soler	El Rebozo de Soledad	
1954 (9th)	José Elías Moreno‡	Las Tres Perfectas Casadas	
1954 (9th)	José María Linares	Las Tres Perfectas Casadas	
1954 (9th)	Andrés Soler	El Bruto	
1955 (10th)	Jorge Martínez de Hoyos‡	Sombra Verde	
1955 (10th)	René Cardona	Un Nuevo Amanecer	
1955 (10th)	Andrés Soler	Los Fernández de Peralvillo	
1956 (11th)	Jaime Fernández‡	Robinson Crusoe	
1956 (11th)	Arturo Martínez	El Siete Leguas	
1956 (11th)	Jorge Martínez de Hoyos	El Túnel Seis	
1957 (12th)	Jorge Martínez de Hoyos‡	Canasta de Cuentos Mexicanos	
1957 (12th)	René Cardona	¡Que Seas Feliz!	
1957 (12th)	José Elías Moreno	Bodas de Oro	
1958 (13th)	Federico Curiel‡	El Buen Ladrón	
1958 (13th)	Raúl Ramírez	Dios No Lo Quiera	
1958 (13th)	Carlos Riquelme	La Dulce Enemiga	
1959—1971	Not awarded		
1972 (14th)	Pancho Córdova‡	"Nosotros" (episode from Tú, Yo, Nosotros)	
1972 (14th)	Eric del Castillo	Los Marcados	
1972 (14th)	David Silva	El Topo	
1973 (15th)	Arturo Beristáin‡	El Castillo de la Pureza	
1973 (15th)	Héctor Ortega	El Rincón de las Vírgenes	
1973 (15th)	Héctor Suárez	Mecánica Nacional	
1974 (16th)	Sergio Bustamante‡	El Principio	
1974 (16th)	Andrés García	El Principio	
1974 (16th)	Alejandro Parodi	El Principio	
1975 (17th)	Ernesto Gómez Cruz‡	La Venida del Rey Olmos	
1975 (17th)	Arturo Beristáin	La Otra Virginidad	
1975 (17th)	Salvador Sánchez	La Choca	
1976 (18th)	Ernesto Gómez Cruz‡	Actas de Marusia	
1976 (18th)	Eduardo López Rojas‡	Actas de Marusia	
1976 (18th)	Claudio Obregón‡	Actas de Marusia	
1977 (19th)	Ernesto Gómez Cruz‡	Maten al León	
1977 (19th)	Manuel Ojeda	El Apando	
1977 (19th)	José Carlos Ruiz	Los Albañiles	
1978 (20th)	Gonzalo Vega‡	En el Lugar Sin Limites	
1978 (20th)	Ramón Menéndez	Cananea	
1978 (20th)	José Carlos Ruiz	Cascabel	
1979 (21st)	Ernesto Gómez Cruz‡	Cadena Perpetua	
1979 (21st)	Narciso Busquets	Cadena Perpetua	
1979 (21st)	Bruno Rey	Pedro Páramo: El Hombre de la Media Luna	
1980 (22nd)	José Carlos Ruiz‡	Fuego en el Mar	
1980 (22nd)	Eric del Castillo	Perro Callejero	
1980 (22nd)	Jorge Húmberto Robles	El Infierno de Todos Tan Temido	
1981 (23rd)	Víctor Junco‡	Misterio	
1981 (23rd)	Jorge Luke	Morir de Madrugada	
1981 (23rd)	Manuel Ojeda	Que Viva Tepito	
1982 (24th)	Carlos López Moctezuma‡	Como México No Hay Dos	
1982 (24th)	Juan Angel Martínez	Noche de Carnaval	
1982 (24th)	Amado Zumaya	¡Ora Sí Tenemos Que Ganar!	
1983 (25th)	Alfredo Sevilla‡	La Víspera	
1983 (25th)	Alejandro Ciangherotti	La Pachanga	
1983 (25th)	Rafael Inclán	Piernas Cruzadas	
1984 (26th)	Alejandro Parodi‡	Nocaut	
1984 (26th)	Gastón Padilla	El Tonto Que Hacía Milagros	
1984 (26th)	Salvador Sánchez	Motel	
1985 (27th)	Miguel Manzano‡	Las Glorias del Gran Púas	
1985 (27th)	Max Kerlow	Frida	
1985 (27th)	Juan Ángel Martínez	Luna de Sangre	
1986 (28th)	José Carlos Ruiz‡	Toña Machetes	
1986 (28th)	Rojo Grau	El Escuadrón de la Muerte	
1986 (28th)	Rojo Grau	Gavilán o Paloma	
1987 (29th)	Alejandro Parodi‡	El Imperio de la Fortuna	
1987 (29th)	Alonso Echánove	Amor a la Vuelta de la Esquina	
1987 (29th)	José Carlos Ruiz	El Tres de Copas	
1988 (30th)	Fernando Balzaretti‡	Muelle Rojo	
1988 (30th)	José Luis Cruz	Mariana, Mariana	
1988 (30th)	Sergio Ramos "El Comanche"	Nocturno Amor Que Te Vas	
1989 (31st)	Jorge Russek‡	Los Camaroneros	
1989 (31st)	José Carlos Ruiz	¿Nos Traicionará el Presidente?	
1989 (31st)	Alejandro Parodi	El Secreto de Romelia	
1990 (32nd)	Roberto Sosa‡	Lola	
1990 (32nd)	Damián Alcázar	La Ciudad al Desnudo	
1990 (32nd)	Claudio Obregón	El Otro Crimen	
1991 (33rd)	Jorge Fegan‡	Rojo Amanecer	
1991 (33rd)	Ignacio Guadalupe	Pueblo de Madera	
1991 (33rd)	Roberto "Flaco" Guzmán	Jóvenes Delincuentes	
1992 (34th)	Eduardo Palomo‡	La Mujer de Benjamín	
1992 (34th)	Bruno Bichir	El Patrullero	
1992 (34th)	Juan Claudio Retes	El Bulto	
1993 (35th)	Luis Aguilar‡	Los Años de Greta	
1993 (35th)	Miguel Manzano	Golpe de Suerte	
1993 (35th)	Alejandro Parodi	Ángel de Fuego	
1994 (36th)	Damián Alcázar‡	Lolo	
1994 (36th)	Pedro Armendáriz	Guerrero Negro	
1994 (36th)	Fernando Balzaretti	Kino	
1994 (36th)	Juan Carlos Colombo	Desiertos Mares	
1994 (36th)	Alberto Estrella	Principio y Fin	
1995 (37th)	José Carlos Ruiz‡	Dos Crimenes	
1995 (37th)	Fernando Arau	Bienvenido — Welcome	
1995 (37th)	Daniel Giménez Cacho	El Callejón de los Milagros	
1995 (37th)	Esteban Soberanes	El Callejón de los Milagros	
1996 (38th)	Damián Alcázar‡	El Anzuelo	
1996 (38th)	Jesús Ochoa‡	Entre Pancho Villa y Una Mujer Desnuda	
1996 (38th)	Héctor Bonilla	Doble Indemnización	
1996 (38th)	Guillermo Gil	Sin Remitente	
1996 (38th)	Manuel Ojeda	Salón México	
1997 (39th)	Salvador Sánchez‡	Amorosos Fantasmas	
1997 (39th)	Germán Dehesa	Cilantro y Perejil	
1997 (39th)	Demián Bichir	Luces de la Noche	
1997 (39th)	Víctor Pérez	Santo Luzbel	
1998 (40th)	Max Kerlow‡	Por Si No Te Vuelvo a Ver	
1998 (40th)	Roberto Cobo	De Noche Vienes, Esmeralda	
1998 (40th)	Justo Martínez	Por Si No Te Vuelvo a Ver	
1999 (41st)	Jesús Ochoa‡	Bajo California, el Limite del Tiempo	
1999 (41st)	Bruno Bichir	El Evangelio de las Maravillas	
1999 (41st)	Rafael Inclán	El Evangelio de las Maravillas	
2000 (42nd)	Pedro Armendáriz‡	La Ley de Herodes	
2000 (42nd)	Salvador Sánchez	La Ley de Herodes	
2000 (42nd)	Alfredo Sevilla	Ave María	
2001 (43rd)	José Alonso‡	Crónica de un Desayuno	
2001 (43rd)	Pedro Armendáriz	Su Alteza Serenísima	
2001 (43rd)	Luis Fernando Peña	Perfume de Violetas (Nadie Te Oye)	
2002 (44th)	Jorge Sepúlveda‡	Un Mundo Raro	
2002 (44th)	Dagoberto Gama	Cuento de Hadas Para Dormir Cocodrilos	
2002 (44th)	Abel Woolrich	El Gavilán de la Sierra	
2003 (45th)	Damián Alcázar‡	El Crimen del Padre Amaro	
2003 (45th)	Armando Hernández	Amar Te Duele	
2003 (45th)	Mario Iván Martínez	La Habitación Azul	
2004 (46th)	Daniel Giménez Cacho‡	Nicotina	
2004 (46th)	Guillermo Gil	El Misterio del Trinidad	
2004 (46th)	Tristán Ulloa	Volverás	
2005 (47th)	Carlos Cobos‡	Conejo en la Luna	
2005 (47th)	Joaquín Cosío	Matando Cabos	
2005 (47th)	Raúl Méndez	Matando Cabos	
2006 (48th)	José María Yazpik‡	Las Vueltas del Citrillo	
2006 (48th)	Ricardo Blume	Mezcal	
2006 (48th)	Jaime Camil	7 Días	
2007 (49th)	Gerardo Taracena‡	El Violín	
2007 (49th)	Álex Angulo	El Laberinto del Fauno	
2007 (49th)	Juan Carlos Colombo	Más Que a Nada en el Mundo	
2007 (49th)	Gabino Rodríguez	Fuera del Cielo	
2008 (50th)	Mario Zaragoza‡	La Zona	
2008 (50th)	Alan Chávez	La Zona	
2008 (50th)	Silverio Palacios	Morirse en Domingo	
2009 (51st)	Héctor Herrera‡	Lake Tahoe	
2009 (51st)	Guillermo Francella	Rudo y Cursi	
2009 (51st)	Tenoch Huerta	Nesio	
2010 (52nd)	José Sefami‡	Conozca la Cabeza de Juan Pérez	
2010 (52nd)	Enrique Arreola	Cinco Días Sin Nora	
2010 (52nd)	Rodrigo Corea	Oveja Negra	
2010 (52nd)	Iván Cortés	Backyard: El Traspatio	
2011 (53rd)	Joaquín Cosío‡	El Infierno	
2011 (53rd)	Juan Ignacio Aranda	Hidalgo: La Historia Jamás Contada	
2011 (53rd)	Ernesto Gómez Cruz	El Infierno	
2011 (53rd)	Daniel Martínez	Chicogrande	
2012 (54th)	Carlos Cobos‡	Pastorela	
2012 (54th)	Kristyan Ferrer	Días de Gracia	
2012 (54th)	Roberto Sosa	Victorio	
2012 (54th)	Mario Zaragoza	Días de Gracia	
2013 (55th)	Daniel Giménez Cacho‡	Colosio: El Asesinato	
2013 (55th)	Dagoberto Gama	Colosio: El Asesinato	
2013 (55th)	Luis Rodríguez	Los Mejores Temas	
2013 (55th)	Gerardo Trejoluna	El Sueño de Lú	
2014 (56th)	Rodolfo Domínguez‡	La Jaula de Oro	
2014 (56th)	Ricardo Blume	Tercera Llamada	
2014 (56th)	Dagoberto Gama	Nómadas	
2014 (56th)	Juan Eduardo Palacios	Heli	
2014 (56th)	Gerardo Taracena	Potosí	
2015 (57th)	Noé Hernández‡	La Tirisia	
2015 (57th)	Luis Alberti	Carmín Tropical	
2015 (57th)	Carlos Bardem	González	
2015 (57th)	Alonso Echánove	Cuatro Lunas	
2015 (57th)	Álvaro Guerrero	Eddie Reynolds y los Ángeles de Acero	
2016 (58th)	Noé Hernández‡	600 Millas	
2016 (58th)	Joaquín Cosío	La Delgada Línea Amarilla	
2016 (58th)	Emilio Echevarria	Un Monstruo de Mil Cabezas	
2016 (58th)	Silverio Palacios	La Delgada Línea Amarilla	
2016 (58th)	Gustavo Sánchez Parra	La Delgada Línea Amarilla	
2017 (59th)	Hoze Meléndez‡	Almacenados	
2017 (59th)	Diego Cataño	Desierto	
2017 (59th)	Mauricio Isaac González	Distancias Cortas	
2017 (59th)	Manuel Ojeda	La 4ª Compañía	
2017 (59th)	Antonio Parra	El Sueño del Mara'akame	
2017 (59th)	Darío T. Pie	La 4ª Compañía	
2017 (59th)	Carlos Valencia	La 4ª Compañía	
2018 (60th)	Miguel Rodarte‡	Tiempo Compartido	
2018 (60th)	Juan Pablo de Santiago	Sueño en Otro Idioma	
2018 (60th)	Pedro de Tavira	Los Adioses	
2018 (60th)	Emilio Echevarría	El Elegido	
2018 (60th)	Hoze Meléndez	Sueño en Otro Idioma	
2019 (61st)	Leonardo Ortizgris‡	Museo	
2019 (61st)	Ernesto Gómez Cruz	De la Infancia	
2019 (61st)	Jorge Antonio Guerrero	Roma	
2019 (61st)	Flavio Medina	Las Niñas Bien	
2019 (61st)	Hoze Meléndez	Mente Revólver	
2020 (62nd)	Raúl Briones	Asfixia	
2020 (62nd)	Juan Manuel Bernal	Sonora	
2020 (62nd)	Daniel Giménez Cacho	Chicuarotes	
2020 (62nd)	Sóstenes Manuel Rojas	Cómprame Un Revólver	
2020 (62nd)	Adrián Vázquez	Polvo	
2021 (63rd)	David Illescas	Sin Señas Particulares	
2021 (63rd)	Christian Vázquez	Te Llevo Conmigo	
2021 (63rd)	Eligio Meléndez	Nuevo Orden	
2021 (63rd)	Emiliano Zurita	El Baile de los 41	
2021 (63rd)	Gabino Rodríguez	Selva Trágica	
2022 (64th)	Kristyan Ferrer	Los Minutos Negros	
2022 (64th)	Andrés Delgado	Cosas Imposibles	
2022 (64th)	Salvador Garcini	Cosas Imposibles	
2022 (64th)	Daniel Giménez Cacho	El Diablo Entre las Piernas	
2022 (64th)	Guillermo Villegas	Noche de Fuego	
2023 (65th)	Raúl Briones	El Norte Sobre el Vacío	
2023 (65th)	Fernando Bonilla	El Norte Sobre el Vacío	
2023 (65th)	Juan Daniel García Treviño	La civil	
2023 (65th)	Jorge A. Jiménez	La civil	
2023 (65th)	Francisco Rubio	Bardo, falsa crónica de unas cuantas verdades	
2024 (66th)	Fernando Cuautle	Heroico	
2024 (66th)	Juan Manuel Bernal	Confesiones	
2024 (66th)	Humberto Busto	Martínez	
2024 (66th)	Julio Cesar Cedillo	A Cielo Abierto	
2024 (66th)	Mateo García	Tótem	
2025 (67th)	Héctor Kotsifakis	Pedro Páramo	
2025 (67th)	Juan Carlos Colombo	No Nos Moverán	
2025 (67th)	Noé Hernández	Arillo de Hombre Muerto	
2025 (67th)	Eduardo Olmos	La Cocina	
2025 (67th)	Alexis Varela	Sujo	
2026 (68th)	Mariano López Sosa	En El Camino	
2026 (68th)	Manuel Cruz Vivas	Cocodrilos	
2026 (68th)	Bernardo Gamboa	El Diablo Fuma (y guarda las cabezas de los cerillos quemados en la misma caja)	
2026 (68th)	Héctor Kotsifakis	Pérdida Total	
2026 (68th)	Roberto Sosa	Las Locuras	

== Multiple wins and nominations ==
The following individuals have received multiple Best Supporting Actor awards:

Wins	Actor
4	Ernesto Gómez Cruz
3	Damián Alcázar
3	José Carlos Ruiz
2	Carlos Cobos
2	Daniel Giménez Cacho
2	Noé Hernández
2	Carlos López Moctezuma
2	Jorge Martínez de Hoyos
2	Jesús Ochoa
2	Alejandro Parodi
2	Víctor Parra
2	Raúl Briones

The following actors received four or more Best Supporting Actor nominations:

Nominations	Actor
7	José Carlos Ruiz
6	Ernesto Gómez Cruz
5	Alejandro Parodi
5	Daniel Giménez Cacho
4	Damián Alcázar
4	Manuel Ojeda
4	Salvador Sánchez

== See also ==
- Academy Award for Best Supporting Actor
