= Incomplete Lovers =

- Theatrical release poster
- Directed by: Gilberto González Penilla
- Written by: Gilberto González Penilla
- Produced by: Óscar Bedriñana; Roberto Fiesco; Ernesto Martínez Arévalo; Janeth Mora; Jessica Villegas Lattuada
- Starring: Alejandro Camacho
- Cinematography: Ricardo Garfias
- Edited by: Gilberto González Penilla; Miguel Salgado
- Production company: Payasito Films SA de CV
- Release dates: November 2022 (Los Cabos); March 30, 2023 (Mexico)
- Running time: 99 minutes
- Country: Mexico
- Language: Spanish

Incomplete Lovers (Spanish: Amores incompletos) is a 2022 Mexican comedy-drama film written and directed by Gilberto González Penilla. Starring Alejandro Camacho. It is about the journey of a 65-year-old man through the Baja California peninsula in search of his dead wife's lovers.

== Synopsis ==
José is a 65-year-old widower who decides to embark on a journey through the Baja California peninsula to confront the trio of lovers that his deceased wife once had.

== Cast ==
The actors participating in this film are:

- Alejandro Camacho as José
- Patricia Bernal as Elena
- Flor Eduarda Gurrola as Sonia
- Hoze Meléndez as Daniel
- Juan Carlos Colombo as Juan Carlos
- Leonardo Flores as Alex
- Héctor Jiménez as Joaquín
- Manuel Landeta as Luigi Kappala
- Edwarda Gurrola as Sonia
- Adolfo Madera as Tourist
- Johanna Murillo as Guadalupe
- Hernán Mendoza as Jose's friend
- Silverio Palacios as Rodrigo
- Oscar Quiñones as Husband
- Gisela Madrigal as Elena's friend 1
- Gabriela Roel as Elena's friend 2
- Tasha Sulkowska as Kimberly
- Elias Visaiz as Photographer
- Karem Momo Ruiz as Vendor The Bufadora

== Production ==
Principal photography began on March 4, 2022, and ended on April 4 of the same year. It was filmed on location in Ensenada, Tijuana, and San Quintin, Mexico.

== Release ==
It had its international premiere in mid-November 2022 at the 11th Los Cabos International Film Festival. It was released commercially on March 30, 2023, in Mexican theaters, to later have a premiere on April 16, 2023, at the 39th Chicago Latino Film Festival.

== Reception ==
=== Critical reception ===
Ernesto Diezmartínez from Letras Libres praised the rhythm and comedy present in the film, highlighting that all the gags in the film work well, also highlighting the direction of the actors and the performance of Alejandro Camacho in his comedy debut. Alejandro Alemán from the newspaper El Universal also highlighted positively the humor used in the film and that the gags happen organically, he also praised Alejandro Camacho's acting variety, calling it innovative.

=== Accolades ===
Year	Award	Category	Recipient	Result	Ref.
2024	49th Diosas de Plata	Best Film	Incomplete Lovers	Pending	
2024	49th Diosas de Plata	Best Director	Gilberto González Penilla	Pending	
2024	49th Diosas de Plata	Best Actor	Alejandro Camacho	Pending	
2024	49th Diosas de Plata	Best Actor in a Minor Role	Hernán Mendoza	Pending	
2024	49th Diosas de Plata	Best Actress in a Minor Role	Johanna Murillo	Pending	
2024	49th Diosas de Plata	Best Original Screenplay	Gilberto González Penilla	Pending	
2024	49th Diosas de Plata	Best Cinematography	Ricardo Garfias	Pending	
2024	49th Diosas de Plata	Best Editing	Gilberto González Penilla & Miguel Salgado	Pending	
