= Tempestad =

2016 film

- Film poster
- Directed by: Tatiana Huezo
- Written by: Tatiana Huezo
- Cinematography: Ernesto Pardo
- Release dates: 13 February 2016 (Berlinale); 19 May 2017 (Mexico)
- Running time: 105 minutes
- Country: Mexico
- Language: Spanish

Tempestad (lit. 'Storm') is a 2016 Mexican documentary film directed by Tatiana Huezo. It was selected as the Mexican entry for the Best Foreign Language Film at the 90th Academy Awards, but it was not nominated.

== Synopsis ==
Tempestad frequently cuts between the stories of two women. The first, Miriam Carvajal, is an employee at Cancún International Airport. She is injustly accused of human trafficking and is imprisoned at a prison in northern Mexico that is dominated by a cartel. The second, Adela Alvarado, is a circus clown who has searched for a decade for Mónica, her disappeared daughter.

== Reception ==
=== Critical response ===
Tempestad has an approval rating of 95% on review aggregator website Rotten Tomatoes, based on 20 reviews, and an average rating of 8.1/10. Metacritic assigned the film a weighted average score of 78 out of 100, based on 8 critics, indicating "generally favorable reviews".

=== Awards and nominations ===
Award	Date of ceremony	Category	Recipients and nominees	Outcome
Fenix Awards	7 December 2016	Best Documentary Feature	Pimienta Films, Cactus Films, and Terminal	Won
Fenix Awards	7 December 2016	Best Documentary Cinematography	Ernesto Pardo	Won
Fenix Awards	7 December 2016	Best Original Score	Leonardo Heiblum and Jacobo Lieberman	Won
Ariel Awards	11 July 2017	Best Picture	Pimienta Films, Cactus Films, and Terminal	Nominated
Ariel Awards	11 July 2017	Best Director	Tatiana Huezo	Won
Ariel Awards	11 July 2017	Best Original Screenplay	Tatiana Huezo	Nominated
Ariel Awards	11 July 2017	Best Documentary Feature	Tatiana Huezo	Won
Ariel Awards	11 July 2017	Best Original Score	Leonardo Heiblum and Jacobo Lieberman	Nominated
Ariel Awards	11 July 2017	Best Sound	Federico González Jordán, Lena Esquenazi, and Carlos Cortés	Won
Ariel Awards	11 July 2017	Best Film Editing	Lucrecia Gutiérrez and Tatiana Huezo	Nominated
Ariel Awards	11 July 2017	Best Cinematography	Ernesto Pardo	Won
International Emmy Awards	20 November 2017	Best Documentary	Pimienta Films, Cactus Films, and Terminal	Nominated

== See also ==
- List of submissions to the 90th Academy Awards for Best Foreign Language Film
- List of Mexican submissions for the Academy Award for Best Foreign Language Film
