= Bodegas Vicente Gandia =

Bodegas Vicente Gandia (Vicente Gandia Pla S.A.), is a Valencian wine producer and seller company founded in 1885. Hoya de Cadenas, its family-owned estate, is located in Utiel, Spain. The cellar produces and sells wines from different appellations of Origin including Utiel-Requena, Valencia, Alicante, Rioja, Ribera del Duero, Rías Baixas, Rueda and cava (sparkling wine).

The cellar has presence in 85 countries spread all over the world, including USA, where Bodegas Vicente Gandia recently opened its subsidiary company Vicente Gandia USA Inc. Russia, Japan, China, Mexico and Ireland are other of the Bodegas Vicente Gandia main wine markets. Bodegas Vicente Gandia is one of the top 15 cellars in Spain as well as one of the top 100 European wine companies according to Plimsoll ranking; a listing that also considers Vicente Gandia as one of the top 46 profitable cellars in Europe.

== History ==
Bodegas Vicente Gandia was founded in 1885 by Vicente Gandia Pla, a wine seller who saw the possibility to start a business around the wine sector. At that time, the trading of Vicente Gandia wines was focused, as well as the rest of Valencian wines, on exporting to European countries in big casks.

The second generation, led by José María Gandia Ferri, had to experience the toughest time of the company: Spanish Civil War, World War II and their corresponding post-wars, which affected Spain as well as the rest of the international markets where the company had presence.

The current president of the company, José María Gandia Perales, is responsible for a qualitative leap for Bodegas Vicente Gandia: the sales of bottled wine. Castillo de Liria is the first wine to be bottled in the Valencian Community; a reference for the other cellars of the region which at the end imitated this new concept. Under José María´s presidency, wines as Ceremonia, Hoya de Cadenas or Fustanova are created in a dynamic and active international trading context.

Besides consolidating the company´s growth, the fourth generation is known for improving the quality of the wines, creating a new line of wines for young people with El Miracle, trading wines from other Spanish Appellations of Origin (Rioja, Ribera del Duero, Rueda, Rias Baixas and sparkling wine) as well as developing the cultural project Art in Cask, an exposition of wine recipients customized by artists like Carmen Calvo, Miquel Navarro, Javier Mariscal etc.

The company's original founder, Gandia Pla was also the grandfather of Spanish-Mexican artist Vicente Gandía through his son Luis.

== Hoya de Cadenas Estate ==
Hoya de Cadenas is a 200-hectare (490-acre) ecologic paradise located 100 kilometres (62 mi) away from Valencia. It has a perfect microclimate that favours the accumulation of polyphenols in grapes.

Beside the cellar, at the vineyard, Bodegas Vicente Gandia has a 12.000 oak casks from Missouri and Allier (France) that produce 2,700,000 litres (590,000 imp gal; 710,000 US gal) of wine including Cabernet Sauvignon, Sauvignon Blanc, Merlot, Tempranillo, Bobal and Petit Verdot varieties.

== "Arte en Barrica" Museum ==
Without any doubt, the main attractive of Hoya de Cadenas is its Manor house built in 1820. The name of Hoya de Cadenas refers to the privileges that their original owners had – the Fernández Córdova – to host people who did not want to join the army.

The vineyards at Hoya de Cadenas have a 200 hectare area, being Vallejo Arroyo and Chacelas the most attractive zones with their clayey soil that produce wines and grapes from different Appellations of Origin including Tempranillo, Cabernet Sauvignon, Merlot, Syrah, Chardonnay, Sauvignon Blanc and Bobal – symbol of Utiel-Requena Appellation of Origin.

Beside this Manor house, in a 19th-century cellar, people can find the exposition room Art in Casks; a cultural project whose aim is to link wine and arts. To this purpose, Bodegas Vicente Gandia gathered a group of Valencian avant-garde artists that could make this real.

== Awards ==
• Internationalization award by Chamber of Commerce of Valencia

• Best cellar of the Valencian Community by the Technical University of Valencia

• José María Gandia, named member of the Noble Order of Wine Knights

• International award for a life directed to wine by Fenavin

• Aster award to entrepreneurial management
