= Hernán Mendoza =

Mexican actor and theatre director

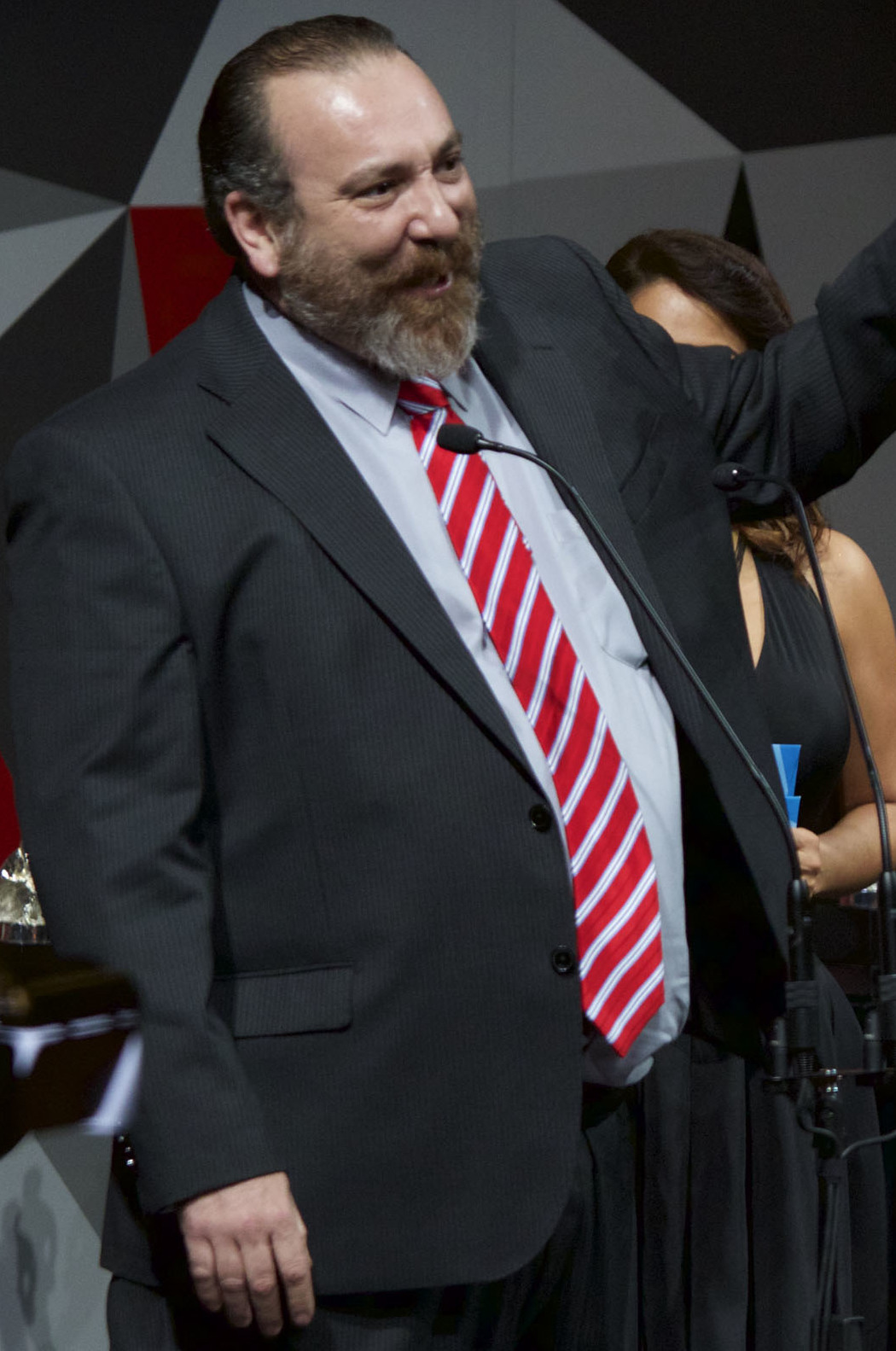
- Mendonza at the 59th Ariel Awards in 2017
- Born: Mexico City, Mexico
- Education: Centro de Educación Artística
- Occupation: Actor
- Years active: 1992–present
- Father: Héctor Mendoza

Hernán Mendoza is a Mexican actor and theatre director best known in his native country for his roles in Mexican films, and telenovelas. in 2017 he won as Best Actor in a Minor Role for his role of Palafox in the film The 4th Company in the 59th Ariel Awards.

== Early career ==
Mendoza was born and raised in Mexico City, Mexico. He is the son of the late theater director Héctor Mendoza, and brother of the renowned director and composer Rodrigo Mendoza. He studied acting at the Centro de Educación Artística of Televisa. After that, he entered the Nucleus of Theater Studies evaluated by Julio Castillo and Luis Fernando de Tavira Noriega.

== Filmography ==
=== Film roles ===
Year	Title	Roles	Notes
2003	Zurdo	Benito	
2007	Espérame en otro mundo	Sebastián	
2009	Caja negra	Juan	
2012	Espacio interior	KDT	
2012	After Lucia	Roberto	
2014	The Incident	Roberto	
2014	Más negro que la noche	García	
2014	The Perfect Dictatorship	El Mazacote	
2015	Una última y nos vamos	Aurelio	
2016	Purasangre	Manolo	
2016	The 4th Company	Palafox	Won—59th Ariel Awards for Best Actor in a Minor Role
2016	El tamaño sí importa	Alfredo	
2017	Ayúdame a pasar la noche	Rodrigo	
2017	April's Daughter	Gregorio	
2017	Me gusta, pero me asusta	Gerardo Aguilar	
2018	Gringo	Celerino Sánchez	
2018	Sacúdete las penas	La Bestia	
2018	Loca por el trabajo	Braulio	
2019	Mirreyes contra Godínez	Don Francisco	
2021	The Box		
2022	Incomplete Lovers	Jose's friend	

=== Television roles ===
Year	Title	Roles	Notes
1992	Ángeles sin paraíso		
1995	La Paloma		
1998	Tres veces Sofía		
2004–2005	Los Sánchez	Cacho	
2006	Montecristo		
2006	Campeones de la vida	Pedro Chaparro	
2007	La niñera	Tío Pepe	Episode: "El mayordomo, el esposo, la esposa y su madre"
2010	Lo que callamos las mujeres	Erik's father	Episode: "Y sí mi novio se enoja"
2011	Cielo rojo	Bernardo Trejo / Román	
2012	Amor cautivo	Camilo "Locamiro"	
2013	Prohibido amar	Félix	
2013–2018	Sr. Ávila	Ybarra	Recurring role (seasons 1–4); 22 episodes
2015	El Dandy	La Güera	
2016	Un día cualquiera	Rafael Adolfo Humberto	Episode: "Maternidad subrogada" Episode: "Las apariencias engañan" Episode: "El amor de los padres"
2016–2018	Rosario Tijeras	León Elías Arteaga	Main role (seasons 1–2); 108 episodes
2017	Su nombre era Dolores	John Castillo	Episode: "Chiquis sin control"
2017	El César	Beto	Episode: "Ave César"
2019	Bronco: The Series	Fermín Ordoñez	
2020	Imperio de mentiras	José Luis Velasco	Main role
