= Mara'akame's Dream =

El sueño del Mara'akame
- Mexican theatrical release poster
- Directed by: Federico Cecchetti
- Screenplay by: Federico Cecchetti
- Produced by: José Felipe Coria; María del Carmen de Lara
- Starring: Luciano Bautista; Inocencio de la Cruz Domínguez; Cruz de la Cruz
- Cinematography: Iván Hernández
- Edited by: Pierre Saint Marti; Raúl Zendejas
- Music by: Huichol Musical; Emiliano Motta
- Production companies: Centro Universitario de Estudios Cinematográficos (CUEC); Estudios Churubusco - Azteca; Instituto Mexicano de Cinematografía (IMCINE)
- Release date: October 14, 2016 (Morelia)
- Running time: 90 minutes
- Country: Mexico
- Language: Wixárika
- Budget: USD$800,000

Mara'akame's Dream (Spanish: El sueño del Mara'akame) is a 2016 Mexican drama film, directed and written by Federico Cecchetti. The film plot is about a young boy who dreams to travel to Mexico City to play with his band, but his father, a Mara'akame (chaman huichol), has a different plan for his future. The film premiered at the 14th Morelia International Film Festival and was awarded Best First of Second Mexican Feature Film.

El sueño del Mara'akame received 12 nominations for the 59th Ariel Awards, including Best Picture and Best Director. It won two, for Best Original Music and Best First Work.

== Cast ==
- Luciano Bautista (Maxa Temai)
- Inocencio de la Cruz Domínguez
- Cruz de la Cruz
- Paly Omar Ezequiel
- Patricio Fernández
- Pascual Hernández
- Antonio Parra (Haka Temai)
- Mariana Treviño

== Accolades ==
Award / Film Festival	Date of ceremony	Category	Recipient(s) and nominee(s)	Result	Ref(s)
Ariel Awards	July 11, 2017	Best Picture	Fondo para la Producción Cinematográfica de Calidad (FOPROCINE) and Centro Universitario de Estudios Cinematográficos (CUEC)	Nominated	
Ariel Awards	July 11, 2017	Best Director	Federico Cecchetti	Nominated	
Ariel Awards	July 11, 2017	Best Supporting Actor	Antonio Parra Parra	Nominated	
Ariel Awards	July 11, 2017	Best Actress in a Minor Role	Mariana Treviño	Nominated	
Ariel Awards	July 11, 2017	Breakthrough Male Performance	Luciano Bautista	Nominated	
Ariel Awards	July 11, 2017	Best Original Screenplay	Federico Cecchetti	Nominated	
Ariel Awards	July 11, 2017	Best First Feature Film	Federico Cecchetti	Won	
Ariel Awards	July 11, 2017	Best Original Score	Emiliano Motta	Won	
Ariel Awards	July 11, 2017	Best Sound	Daniel Rojo and Alicia Segovia	Nominated	
Ariel Awards	July 11, 2017	Best Film Editing	Pierre Saint Martin Castellanos and Raúl Zendejas	Nominated	
Ariel Awards	July 11, 2017	Best Makeup	Roberto Ortíz	Nominated	
Ariel Awards	July 11, 2017	Best Costume Design	Xihuitl Mariana Gandía	Nominated	
