= Una última y nos vamos =

- Theatrical release poster
- Directed by: Noé Santillán-López
- Written by: César Rodríguez; Mauricio Argüelles
- Produced by: Jimena L. Arguelles Izaguirre; Mauricio Argüelles; Jerónimo Pérez Correa; José Antonio Hernández; Martha Higareda; Francesco Papini; Cesar Rodriguez; Noé Santillán-López; Eckehardt Von Damm
- Starring: Martha Higareda; Héctor Bonilla; Alejandro Calva; Mauricio Argüelles
- Cinematography: Mario Gallegos
- Edited by: Angel de Guillermo
- Music by: Arturo Solar
- Production companies: Epoca Films; Neverending Media
- Release date: May 29, 2015
- Running time: 111 minutes
- Country: Mexico
- Language: Spanish

Una última y nos vamos (lit. 'One last and off we go') is a 2015 Mexican comedy road movie directed by Noé Santillán-López (in his directorial debut) and written by César Rodríguez & Mauricio Argüelles. Starring Martha Higareda, Héctor Bonilla, Alejandro Calva and Mauricio Argüelles. It premiered on May 29, 2015, in Mexican theaters.

== Synopsis ==
A down-on-his-luck mariachi group gets the call of a lifetime when they are named finalists in a national contest for the best mariachi band in Mexico. The winning group will receive a prize of 250,000 pesos and will have the honor of performing Las Mañanitas for the Virgin of Guadalupe at the Basilica on December 12. The problem begins when they lack a member to be able to participate, so they integrate the son of one of them, a young rocker. During their travels, they encounter a series of unexpected events, turning their whole trip into a complete odyssey.

== Cast ==
The actors participating in this film are:

- Martha Higareda as Flor
- Héctor Bonilla as Picho
- Alejandro Calva as Officer Reyes
- Mauricio Argüelles as Virginio
- José Sefami as Gaspar
- Hernán Mendoza as Aurelio
- Roberto Medina as Marcial
- Cesar Rodriguez as Chelupe
- Ernesto Loera as Joaquín
- Oliver Nava as Martin
- Mariana Treviño as Hilda
- Silverio Palacios as Don Artemio
- Claudia Bollat as Carmelia
- Amorita Rasgado as Marthita
- Martha Cervantes as Consuelo
- Andrea Lagunés as Azalea
- Carlos Macias as Nirvino
- Veronica Falcón as Casilda
- José Luis Cordero as Clandestine
- Ramon Alvarez as Drunk
- John Duran as Chamberlain
- Nuria Blanco as Dancer
- Gabriel Chávez as Master of ceremonies
- Rodrigo Santacruz as Organizer
- Cortéz Amparo as Doña Conchita
- Magda Bruggemann as Doña Pepina

== Production ==
Principal photography lasted 6 weeks on location in Jalisco, Mexico City, and The Basilica.

== Reception ==
=== Critical reception ===
On the review aggregator website Rotten Tomatoes, 50% of 6 critics' reviews are positive, with an average rating of 4.8/10.

Lucero Calderón from Excelsior concludes that it is a good film whose acting quality on the part of the entire cast partly rescues the script that decays in the final route. Arturo Magaña from Cine Premiere highlights the fresh, original and very well written script that manages to generate laughter and be emotional. He also praises the main cast, especially Mariana Treviño who gives a very funny performance. On the other hand, Mario P. Székely from Siete24.mx described this film as a Mexican comedy with nothing special, whose story does not seek to continue beyond the obvious and the silly, although it highlights the charisma of the actors.

=== Accolades ===
Year	Award	Category	Recipient	Result	Ref.
2016	Diosas de Plata	Best Supporting Actor	Héctor Bonilla	Nominated	
2016	Diosas de Plata	Best Actress in a Minor Role	Mariana Treviño	Won	
2016	Diosas de Plata	Best Newcomer - Male	Oliver Nava	Nominated	
2016	Diosas de Plata	Best Editing	Angel de Guillermo	Nominated	
