= The Gaze of the Sea =

- Theatrical release poster
- Directed by: José Álvarez
- Written by: José Álvarez; Diego Rivera Kohn
- Produced by: José Álvarez; Julio Chavezmontes; Sumie Garcia; Carlos Paz; Ingmar Trost
- Starring: Hortencia Peres Rocha
- Cinematography: Sebastian Hofmann
- Edited by: Diego Rivera Kohn
- Music by: Martín Delgado
- Production companies: Alacrán con alas Piano Producciones; Sutor Kolonko
- Release dates: March 2017 (GIFF); April 5, 2018 (Mexico)
- Running time: 80 minutes
- Countries: Mexico; Germany
- Language: Spanish

The Gaze of the Sea (Spanish: Los ojos del mar, lit. 'The eyes of the sea') is a 2017 Mexican-German documentary film written, directed and co-produced by José Álvarez. It is about the journey of Hortensia, a woman from Tuxpan, who searches the seas of Veracruz for remains and memories of a fishing boat that sank in the area. The film was named on the shortlist for Mexico's entry for the Academy Award for Best Foreign Language Film at the 91st Academy Awards, but it was not selected.

== Synopsis ==
Hortencia, a native of Tuxpan, is a woman with a shady past. He begins a journey between land and sea to collect the messages and memories of the families that lost one of their members five years ago in a fishing boat that sank on the shores of the Gulf of Mexico. Little by little, this trip becomes a redemption for Hortencia.

== Release ==
It had its world premiere in mid-March 2017 at the 32nd Guadalajara International Film Festival. It had its commercial premiere on April 5, 2018, in Mexican theaters.

== Reception ==
=== Critical reception ===
Ulices Castañeda from Crónica wrote: "A documentary film that will give much to talk about throughout the year, due to the wonderful rite that is created to say goodbye to fishermen who do not return from the sea, through material memories sent by their loved ones and that become the flowers that they become their last goodbye".

=== Accolades ===
Year	Award	Category	Recipient	Result	Ref.
2017	Guadalajara International Film Festival	Best Mexican Film	José Álvarez	Nom	
2017	Nyon Visions du Réel	Interreligieux Award	José Álvarez	Won	
