= Tatiana Huezo =

Film director

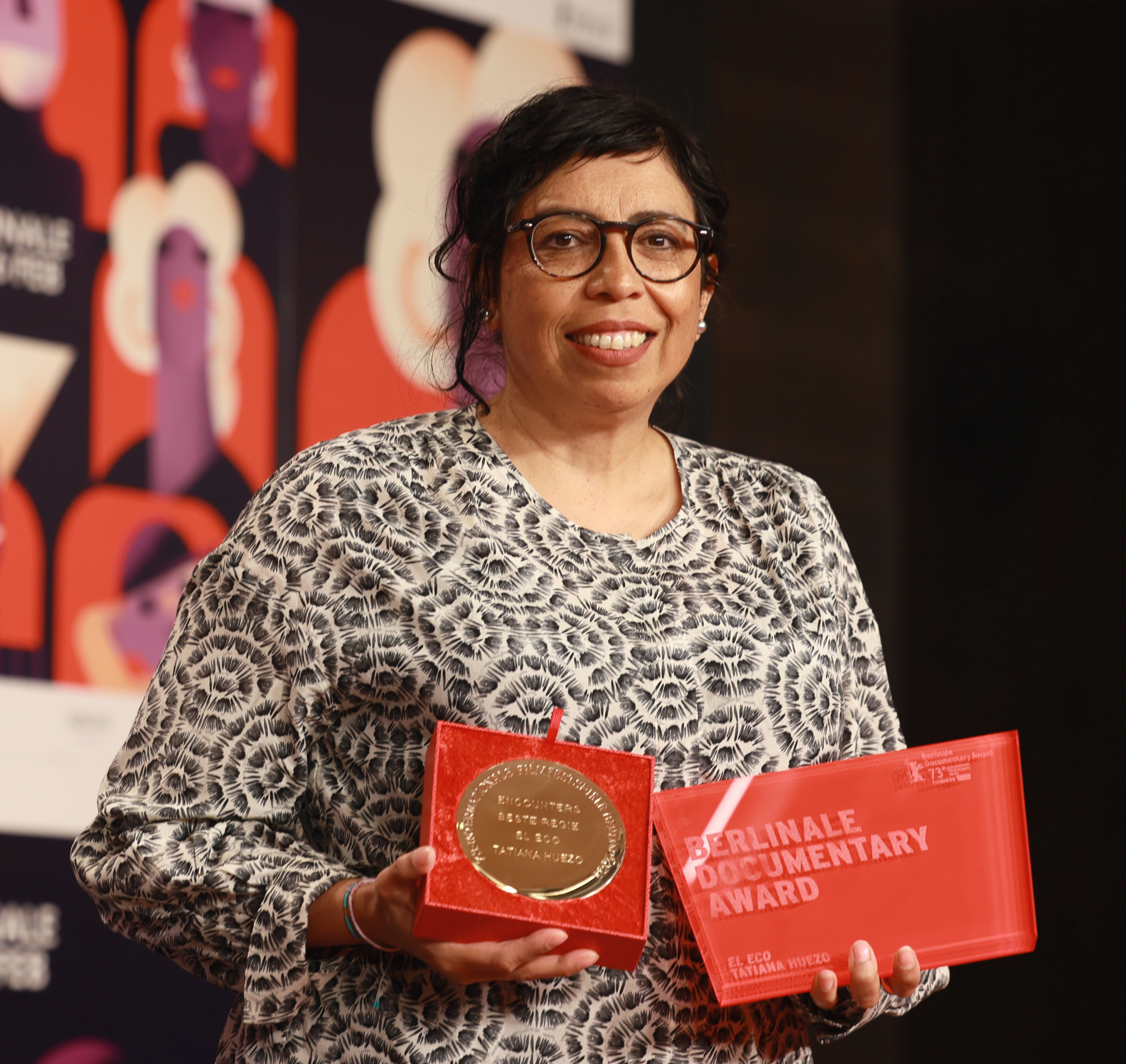
- Huezo at the 2023 Berlin International Film Festival
- Born: Tatiana Huezo Sánchez; 9 January 1972 (age 54); San Salvador, El Salvador
- Education: Pompeu Fabra University
- Occupation: Film director
- Awards: Fénix Award for Best Documentary (2016); Ariel Award for Best Director (2017)

Tatiana Huezo Sánchez (Latin American Spanish: [taˈtjana ˈweso ˈsantʃes]; born 9 January 1972) is a film director of Salvadoran and Mexican nationality, residing in Mexico. Her first film, El lugar más pequeño (2011), a documentary about the Salvadoran Civil War, has been awarded internationally. In 2016 she premiered Tempestad, the story of two women who suffer the consequences of human trafficking in Mexico. It received the 2016 Fénix Award for Best Documentary. In 2021, she premiered her first fiction film, Noche de Fuego, a story about three young girls in Mexico on their path to examine their adolescence in a town dominated by drug trade and human trafficking.

== Career ==
Born in El Salvador, Tatiana Huezo has lived in Mexico since she was four years old. She graduated from the Centro de Capacitación Cinematográfica (CCC), where she has since taught classes. In 2004 she completed a master's degree in creative documentary at Pompeu Fabra University in Barcelona.

After her first attempts—short films such as Arido (1992), Tiempo cáustico (1997), Familia (2004) or Sueño (2005)—she gained international renown with her first feature-length film, El lugar más pequeño (2011), presented as an international premiere at Visions du Réel in 2011 where it won the Grand Prix for the Best Feature-length Film. Her documentary, El lugar más pequeño is a testimony to the experience of the civil war in El Salvador. It has received numerous awards and has been exhibited at more than 50 festivals around the world.

In 2015 Huezo presented Ausencias, a 27-minute short film that recounts the pain of Lulu, a mother who loses her husband and son, who have disappeared due to organized crime.

In her work, she has portrayed the impunity of people before justice and institutions, humanizing the victims. About Tempestad, Huezo said:

Against the vomit of figures, images, and discourses that make the victims invisible, turning them into numbers, it seems essential to return to the faces, to the intimate gesture, to their history and complexity, to return to people, to their dreams, pains and hopes. Maybe then from there we can return to empathy, to the capacity to move us.

Tempestad, which received the 2016 Fénix Award for Best Documentary, tells the true story of Mexican women Miryam Carvajal – who spent almost a year incarcerated in Matamoros prison, accused of human trafficking, a crime she did not commit – and Aldela Alvarado, who is looking for her missing daughter. "What happens in Mexico is close to the civil war that is taking place in Central America," explains Huezo.

The mechanisms of terror [in El Salvador] are very similar to those that currently occur in Mexico. [...] We have begun to see corpses without heads, the development of femicide on the border with the United States. [...] Unfortunately in Latin America we find widespread corruption, and impunity continues to be exercised on the basis of profound economic inequality among people.

In 2021, after many years of focusing her craft on documentaries, Huezo premiered her first fiction feature, Noche de Fuego (2021). In a mountain town in Mexico, Ana, Paula and Maria live a childhood that oscillates between idyllic and dreadful, as they reach adolescence, they are faced with the growing pains of womanhood, and a threatening and cruel environment.

Huezo, born in El Salvador and raised in Mexico, had already been researching the area for a documentary she’d been developing, so in the end it seemed like the perfect opportunity to step into fiction filmmaking, after a career made from award-winning socially committed documentaries.

This film was based on the Jennifer Clement novel, Prayers for the Stolen (2012). It premiered at the 2021 Cannes Film Festival and has received critical acclaim for its powerful storytelling and cinematography.

== Filmography ==
- Arido - 1992
- Tiempo cáustico - 1997
- El ombligo del mundo - 2001
- Familia - 2004
- Sueño - 2005
- The Tiniest Place (El lugar más pequeño) - 2011
- Ausencias - 2015
- The Empty Classroom (El aula vacia) - 2015
- Tempestad - 2016
- Prayers for the Stolen (Noche de fuego) - 2021
- The Echo (El Eco) - 2023
- Galerna - In production

== Awards and nominations ==
Year	Award	Category	Nominated work	Result	Ref.
2011	Ariel Awards	Best Documentary Feature	El lugar más pequeño	Won	
2011	Ariel Awards	Best First Work	El lugar más pequeño	Nominated	
2011	Mar del Plata International Film Festival	FIPRESCI Award - Special Mention	El lugar más pequeño	Won	
2011	Mar del Plata International Film Festival	Best Latin-American Film	El lugar más pequeño	Nominated	
2012	Cinema Eye Honors	Spotlight Award	El lugar más pequeño	Won	
2016	Ariel Awards	Best Documentary Short	Ausencias	Won	
2016	Fénix Awards	Best Documentary	Tempestad	Won	
2017	International Emmy Awards	Best Documentary	Tempestad	Nominated	
2017	Ariel Awards	Best Picture	Tempestad	Nominated	
2017	Ariel Awards	Best Director	Tempestad	Won	
2017	Ariel Awards	Best Original Screenplay	Tempestad	Nominated	
2017	Ariel Awards	Best Documentary Feature	Tempestad	Won	
2017	Ariel Awards	Best Film Editing	Tempestad	Nominated	
2021	Cannes Film Festival	Un Certain Regard	Prayers for the Stolen	Nominated	
2021	Cannes Film Festival	Un Certain Regard - Special Mention	Prayers for the Stolen	Won	
2021	San Sebastián International Film Festival	Horizontes Latinos	Prayers for the Stolen	Won	
2021	San Sebastián International Film Festival	RTVE Otra Mirada Award	Prayers for the Stolen	Won	
2021	Los Angeles Film Critics Association Awards	Next Generation Award	Prayers for the Stolen	Won	
2021	Forqué Awards	Best Latin-American Film	Prayers for the Stolen	Won	
2022	Directors Guild of America Awards	Outstanding First-Time Feature Film Director	Prayers for the Stolen	Nominated	
2022	Satellite Awards	Best Foreign Language Film	Prayers for the Stolen	Nominated	
2022	Independent Spirit Awards	Best International Film	Prayers for the Stolen	Nominated	
2022	Palm Springs International Film Festival	Young Cineastes Award	Prayers for the Stolen	Nominated	
2022	Palm Springs International Film Festival	FIPRESCI Prize for Best International Feature Film	Prayers for the Stolen	Won	
2022	Palm Springs International Film Festival	Best Ibero-American Film	Prayers for the Stolen	Won	
2022	Platino Awards	Best Director	Prayers for the Stolen	Nominated	
2022	Ariel Awards	Best Picture	Prayers for the Stolen	Won	
2022	Ariel Awards	Best Director	Prayers for the Stolen	Nominated	
2022	Ariel Awards	Best Adapted Screenplay	Prayers for the Stolen	Won	
2022	Goya Awards	Best Ibero-American Film	Prayers for the Stolen	Nominated	
2023	Berlin International Film Festival	Golden Bear Plaque	The Echo	Nominated	
2023	Berlin International Film Festival	Berlinale Documentary Film Award	The Echo	Won	
2023	Berlin International Film Festival	Encounters Award: Best Director	The Echo	Won	
