= Walking Distance (film) =

- Theatrical release poster
- Spanish: Distancias cortas
- Directed by: Alejandro Guzmán Alvarez
- Written by: Itzel Lara
- Produced by: Karla Bukantz; Henner Hofmann; Rodrigo Milanesi; Mariana Monroy; Daniel Piza Ruiz
- Starring: Luca Ortega; Mauricio Isaac; Joel Figueroa; Martha Claudia Moreno
- Cinematography: Diana Garay
- Edited by: Juan Manuel Figueroa; Ana García
- Music by: Luca Ortega
- Production companies: Centro de Capacitación Cinematográfica (CCC); FOPROCINE
- Release dates: 9 October 2015 (IFFMH); 25 January 2019 (Mexico)
- Running time: 104 minutes
- Country: Mexico
- Language: Spanish

Walking Distance (Spanish: Distancias cortas, lit. 'Short distances') is a 2015 Mexican comedy-drama film directed by Alejandro Guzmán Alvarez (in his directorial debut) and written by Itzel Lara. Starring Luca Ortega (who also composed the music for the film), Mauricio Isaac, Joel Figueroa and Martha Claudia Moreno.

== Synopsis ==
Federico is a 45-year-old man and suffers from morbid obesity that prevents him from moving easily, for this reason he spends every day locked up in his house with sporadic visits from his brother-in-law Ramón and his sister. But, after buying a camera and discovering an unrevealed film, Federico embarks on a journey to witness a sunrise on the beach.

== Cast ==
The actors participating in this film are:

- Luca Ortega as Federico Sánchez
- Joel Isaac Figueroa as Paulo
- Mauricio Isaac as Ramón
- Martha Claudia Moreno as Rosaura
- Mayra Hermosillo as Pilar
- Regina Flores Ribot as Federico's mother
- José Carriedo as Doctor
- César Cancino as Soccer Kid 1
- Alejandro Cruz López as Soccer Kid 2
- Juan Carlos Medellin as Mailman
- Emilio Gaitán as Veracruz Kid

== Production ==
=== Financing ===
It was financed by the Fund for Quality Film Production (Foprocine) after winning the 2014 First Film Fiction Film Project Production Contest.

=== Filming ===
Principal photography began on June 2, 2014, in Mexico City and Veracruz, Mexico.

== Release ==
It had its international premiere on October 9, 2015, at the 64th Mannheim-Heidelberg International Film Festival, a few days later it premiered at the Montréal Festival du Nouveau Cinéma, Canada. It had its first premiere in Mexico on March 6, 2016, at the Guadalajara International Film Festival. It was commercially released on January 25, 2019, in Mexican theaters.

== Reception ==
=== Critical reception ===
Irving Torres Yllán from CineNT highlighted Itzel Lara's story and script for being able to write credible, lively and, above all, human characters, as well as highlighting the good choice of casting. Rafael Aviña from Cine Premiere also highlights the human, sincere and realistic nature of the story but without forgetting the sense of humor.

=== Accolades ===
Year	Award	Category	Recipient	Result	Ref.
2015	Mannheim-Heidelberg International Filmfestival	Prize of the Ecumenical Jury	Walking Distance	Won	
2015	Tehran International Film Festival	Best Directing	Alejandro Guzmán Alvarez	Won	
2016	The Festival Pantalla de Cristal	Best Supporting Actress	Martha Claudia Moreno	Won	
2016	Pantalla de Cristal Film Festival	Best Cinematography	Diana Garay	Won	
2016	Rome Film Fest	Best Film	Alejandro Guzmán Alvarez & Mariana Monroy	Nominated	
2016	Santa Barbara International Film Festival	New Vision Award	Alejandro Guzmán Alvarez	Nominated	
2016	Skip City International D-Cinema Festival	Feature Film	Walking Distance	Won	
2017	Golden Rooster and Hundred Flowers Film Festival	Best Director	Alejandro Guzmán Alvarez	Won	
2017	Golden Rooster and Hundred Flowers Film Festival	Best Actor	Luca Ortega	Won	
2017	Ariel Award	Best Actress in a Minor Role	Martha Claudia Moreno	Won	
2017	Ariel Award	Best Supporting Actor	Mauricio Isaac	Nominated	
2017	Ariel Award	Breakthrough Male Performance	Luca Ortega	Nominated	
2017	Ariel Award	Best Original Screenplay	Itzel Lara	Nominated	
2017	Ariel Award	Best First Feature Film	Alejandro Guzmán Alvarez	Nominated	
