= The Darkness (2016 Mexican film) =

Horror thriller film

- Theatrical release poster
- Directed by: Daniel Castro Zimbrón
- Written by: Daniel Castro Zimbrón; Denis Languérand; David Pablos
- Produced by: Daniel Castro Zimbrón
- Starring: Brontis Jodorowsky
- Cinematography: Diego García
- Edited by: Daniel Castro Zimbrón; Natalia López; Yulene Olaizola
- Music by: Carlo Ayhllon
- Production companies: Varios Lobos; Zoología Fantástica; Les films de l'etranger
- Distributed by: Memento Films
- Release dates: September 7, 2016 (L'Étrange Festival); October 28, 2016 (MIFF); October 13, 2017 (Mexico)
- Running time: 93 minutes
- Countries: Mexico; France
- Language: Spanish

The Darkness (Spanish: Las tinieblas) is a 2016 Mexican-French horror thriller film directed by Daniel Castro Zimbrón and written by Zimbrón, Denis Languérand & David Pablos. Starring Brontis Jodorowsky. The film was named on the shortlist for Mexican's entry for the Academy Award for Best International Feature Film at the 91st Academy Awards, but it was not selected.

== Synopsis ==
In an isolated cabin inside a toxic forest where a mysterious beast prowls the surroundings, a father and his children search for a way to survive inside their cabin.

== Cast ==
The actors participating in this film are:

- Brontis Jodorowsky as Gustavo
- Fernando Álvarez Rebeil as Marcos
- Aliocha Sotnikoff as Argel
- Camila Robertson Glennie as Luciana
- Meraqui Pradis as Kid
- Alejandro Villeli as Old man

== Release ==
It had its world premiere on September 7, 2016 at the L'Étrange Festival. Then it premiered on October 28, 2016 at the 14th Morelia International Film Festival. It had its commercial premiere on October 13, 2017 in Mexican theaters.

== Reception ==
=== Critical reception ===
On the review aggregator website Rotten Tomatoes, 100% of 7 critics' reviews are positive, with an average rating of 7.5/10.

=== Accolades ===
Year	Award / Festival	Category	Recipient	Result	Ref.
2016	Morelia International Film Festival	Best Feature Film - Audience award	Daniel Castro Zimbrón	Won	
2017	Feratum Film Festival	Best Mexican Film	Daniel Castro Zimbrón	Won	
2017	Feratum Film Festival	Best Script	Daniel Castro Zimbrón, Denis Languérand & David Pablos	Won	
2017	Feratum Film Festival	Best Actress	Camila Robertson Glennie	Won	
2017	Feratum Film Festival	Best Music	Carlo Ayhllon	Won	
2017	Feratum Film Festival	Best Art Direction	Alisarine Ducolomb	Won	
2017	Canacine Awards	Best Director	Daniel Castro Zimbrón	Nominated	
2017	Ariel Awards	Breakthrough Male Performance	Aliocha Sotnikoff Ramos	Nominated	
2017	Ariel Awards	Breakthrough Female Performance	Camila Robertson Glennie	Nominated	
2017	Ariel Awards	Best Original Score	Carlo Ayhllón	Nominated	
2017	Ariel Awards	Best Art Direction	Alisarine Ducolomb	Nominated	
2017	Ariel Awards	Best Visual Effects	Gustavo Bellón, Benoit Manequinn, Andrés Palma & David Camiro	Nominated	
