= The Box (2021 Venezuelan film) =

2021 film

- Film poster
- Directed by: Lorenzo Vigas
- Written by: Paula Markovitch; Laura Santullo; Lorenzo Vigas
- Produced by: Michel Franco; Jorge Hernandez Aldana; Lorenzo Vigas
- Starring: Hernán Mendoza
- Cinematography: Sergio Armstrong
- Edited by: Pablo Barbieri Carrera; Isabela Monteiro de Castro
- Release date: 6 September 2021 (Venice)
- Countries: Mexico; Venezuela; United States
- Language: Spanish

The Box (Spanish: La caja) is a 2021 thriller drama film co-written, co-produced and directed by Lorenzo Vigas. It was selected to compete for the Golden Lion at the 78th Venice International Film Festival and as the Venezuelan entry for the Best International Feature Film at the 95th Academy Awards.

== Cast ==
- Hernán Mendoza
- Hatzín Navarrete
- Cristina Zulueta

== Reception ==
On the review aggregator website Rotten Tomatoes, 86% of 21 critics' reviews are positive, with an average rating of 6.3/10. The website's consensus reads: "A rewardingly unsettling watch, The Box handles its sensitive themes with intelligence and empathy." Metacritic, which uses a weighted average, assigned the film a score of 82 out of 100, based on 6 critics, indicating "universal acclaim".

== See also ==
- List of submissions to the 95th Academy Awards for Best International Feature Film
- List of Venezuelan submissions for the Academy Award for Best International Feature Film
