= The Dead (2014 film) =

- Theatrical release poster
- Directed by: Santiago Mohar Volkow
- Written by: Santiago Mohar Volkow
- Produced by: Alejandro Blazquez de Nicolas; Pablo Carvallo; Regina Galaz; Germán García; Alejandro Lopez Portillo; Federico Mallet; Andres Martinez-Rios; Santiago Mohar Volkow; José Julián Morales; Gerardo Moran; Juan Martín Simons; Øyvind Stiauren; Joakim Ziegler
- Starring: Elena Larrea; Florencia Ríos; Ignacio Beteta; Jorge Caballero; Santiago Corcuera
- Cinematography: Luis Sols Balcells
- Edited by: Didac Palou
- Music by: Diego Lozano
- Production companies: Purgatorio Films; Celuloide; Zamora Films
- Release dates: October 23, 2014 (MIFF); April 22, 2016 (Mexico)
- Running time: 92 minutes
- Country: Mexico
- Languages: Spanish; English

The Dead (Spanish: Los muertos) is a 2014 Mexican drama film written, directed and co-produced by Santiago Mohar Volkow. Starring Elena Larrea, Florencia Ríos, Ignacio Beteta, Jorge Caballero and Santiago Corcuera. The film was named on the shortlist for Mexico's entry for the Academy Award for Best Foreign Language Film at the 89th Academy Awards, but it was not selected.

== Synopsis ==
In one weekend, the lives of five apathetic wealthy young people are distorted when they collide with national violence and the accidental death of one of them.

== Cast ==
The actors participating in this film are:

- Elena Larrea as Elena
- Florencia Ríos as Elsa
- Ignacio Beteta as Ignacio
- Jorge Caballero as Diego
- Santiago Corcuera as Santiago
- Aldo Escalante Ochoa as Gabo
- David Perlo as David
- Marcos Manuel Radosh as Federico
- José Miguel Puig as José
- Patricia Amalia Volkow as Elena's aunt
- Natalia Volkow as Elena's mom
- Juana Ochoa as Nacho's mom
- Juan Antonio Correa as Car thief
- Oscar Enrique Serrano as Muggle man
- Patricia Kurczyn as Muffle woman
- Néctor Ulises Chavez as Diego's driver
- Anna Paola Mansi as Santiago's mom
- Daniel Bello Torres as Gardener
- Paloma Corcuera Mansi as Santiago's sister
- Mariana Alagon as Mariana
- Lorena Del Pino as Mariola
- Marcos Radosh

== Release ==
It had its world premiere on October 23, 2014, at the 12th Morelia International Film Festival. It had its commercial premiere on April 22, 2016, in Mexican theaters.

== Reception ==
=== Critical reception ===
On the review aggregator website Rotten Tomatoes, 50% of 8 critics' reviews are positive, with an average rating of 5.0/10.

Carlos Bonfil from La Jornada highlights that the director captures the monotony in youthful behavior very well, even pointing out that he manages to make the best of an expressive and captivating soundtrack, resulting in a novel film. On the other hand, Salvador Franco Reyes from Excelsior describes it as empty, superficial and obvious in regards to the theme of the story and the characters, he also regrets the use of music and some sequences.

=== Accolades ===
Year	Award / Festival	Category	Recipient	Result	Ref.
2014	Morelia International Film Festival	Best Mexican Feature Film	Santiago Mohar Volkow	Nominated	
2014	Mar del Plata International Film Festival	Latin-American Competition - Best Feature Film	Santiago Mohar Volkow	Nominated	
