= Vicente Gandía =

Mexican artist (1935–2009)

- Gandía in 2001 interview with Cristina Pacheco
- Born: March 20, 1935; Valencia, Spain
- Died: March 9, 2009 (aged 73); Cuernavaca, Morelos, Mexico
- Occupation: painter
- Years active: 1954–2009
- Children: 2
- Relatives: Christina Pastor (daughter-in-law)

Vicente Gandía (March 20, 1935 – March 9, 2009) was a Mexican artist of Spanish origin who is best known for his depictions of nature and buildings. He originally trained to be an architect but abandoned this in favor of art, but with his art career beginning by drawing interiors. His major break came in 1968, with international expose which led to greater demand for his work. Recognitions for his art include membership in the Salón de la Plástica Mexicana, two awards from the same institution, a homage to the artist sponsored by the Instituto Nacional de Antropología e Historia while still alive and two others after his death, one with the Festival Internacional Cervantino.

== Life ==
Vicente Gandía was born in Valencia, Spain, in 1935 to Maria Sanz de Gandía and Sr. Luis Gandía. His paternal grandfather was Vicente Gandía Pla, who founded the wine company Bodegas Vicente Gandia. He immigrated as a teen with his mother and sister to Mexico in 1951 to live with his uncle. The family settled in Mexico City, where the artist lived until moving later in life to Cuernavaca.

Shortly after his arrival in Mexico he enrolled in the architecture program of the Universidad Nacional Autónoma de México but dropped out two years later. He devoted himself to painting instead, becoming self-taught.

He had an art career that spanned over fifty years, remaining active in this work until his death. Gandía died on March 9, 2009, from a heart attack in Cuernavaca just short of his 75th birthday. He was survived by his wife, Andrea Velasco, and two children, Antonio Gandía and Xihuitl Mariana Gandía, the latter having been nominated an Ariel Award for Best Costume Design in 2017 for the film El Sueño del Mara'akame, and the former eventually having three children of his own, making them Vicente's only grandchildren. Vicente's son, Antonio married actress Christina Pastor in 2015. Vicente also had another son in 1970 who did not survive until birth.

Gandía with wife in late 1960s

== Career ==
His career has mostly been in painting but has also done various other types of works such as print making, sculpting, ceramics and jewelry design. He began by drawing interiors of buildings in the 1950s while still an architecture student. After leaving architecture, he work on various projects until his big break in painting in 1968. Since then, his work with its simple iconography became popular internationally.

His first exhibition as an artist was in 1954 at the Instituto de Cultura Hispánica in Guadalajara. He had numerous individual shows at venues in Mexico and abroad such as the Columbia Museum of Art in 1968 and 1973, the Chastenet European Center, London in 1976, the Kimberley Gallery, Washington in 1987, the Palacio de Bellas Artes in 1988, Capella de l’Antic Hospital in Barcelona in 1990, Galerie Palette Roderhaus Wuppertal in Wuppertal, the Galerie du Palais de la Culture, Algiers in 1991, and the Museo Español de Arte Contemporáneo, Madrid in 1993. His international exhibitions led to a marked increase in demand for his work and invitation to exhibit. Gandía has also participated in over 100 collective exhibitions in Mexico, the United States, Canada, Israel, Puerto Rico, Argentina and Europe.

Gandía's work can be found in the collections of the Museo de Arte Moderno, the Museum of Modern Art in New York, the Santiago Museum of Contemporary Art, the Museu de la Diputacio in Barcelona, the Museo de Arte Moderno in Toluca, the Biblioteca P. Arango in Bogotá, the Universidad Nacional Autónoma de México, the Instituto de Cultura Puertorriqueña in San Juan, the Biblioteca Emilio A. Carrafa in Córdoba, Argentina, the Museo de Monterrey, the Pinoteca de la Dirección General del Registro de la Propriedad in Mexico City and the Banamex collection.

None canvas work includes the stained glass of the Capilla de Beneficiencia Francesa y Belga in Coyoacán and the mosaic mural at the Palacio Municipal of Matamoros, Tamaulipas. Gandía also worked as a graphic and commercial designer, with magazines such as El Zaguán, Naturaleza and Universidad de México.

Gandía's recognitions for his work include an honorary mention from the Salón de Grabado event of the Salón de la Plástica Mexicana in 1970 and first prize at the same event in 1971. He was also accepted as a member of the Salón de la Plástica Mexicana. In 1994 the Instituto Nacional de Antropología e Historia held a retrospective of his work at the Palacio de Cortés in Cuernavaca. Just after the artist's death, a retrospective and homage was held at the Museo Gene Bryon in the city of Guanajuato as part of the Festival Internacional Cervantino, and a year later in 2010, a retrospective was held at the Galería del Seminario de la Cultura Mexicana in Cuernavaca.

== Artistry ==
Although he worked in a number of techniques such as murals, graphic art and even some cinema, most of his work and his best work is oil on canvas, done in a principally figurative and naturalist style.

His work in art grew out the drawing of interiors from his architecture days. He was a self-taught artist, with his initial influences being from André Masson. By 1974, his work had developed its own distinctive cues in its depiction of the natural world. By the end of the 1970s, these cues had refined themselves such that while certain elements reappeared, they never did so in the same way. For the rest of his career, he continued with this trajectory, but integrating different influences such as those from the work of Francisco de Zurbarán, Goya, Monet, Édouard Manet, Juan Gris and Pierre Bonnard and especially Cézanne and Matisse, which his best work from critical standpoint from the late 1960s through the 1980s. However, there was a brief period from 1996 to 1999, where he abandoned his figurative style and focus on buildings and nature to experiment with abstract art. This was prompted by the artist's interest in the work of Eduardo Chillida, Esteban Vicente, Antoni Tàpies, Albert Ràfols-Casamada, Franz Kline and Joan Miró. The stage only lasted for three years, which included new colors along with new forms. Gandía then returned to his former style, but adding more variation than before in what was depicted and how, with intense colors.

His style was based on simple objects, eliminating excessive rhetoric in his work and the modulation of space. He created landscapes, scenes of houses, greenhouses, patios, labyrinths, flowers, fruits and the homes he lived in over the years, with elements that seem to move. Notable examples of his work include Silla en jardín (1988) and El oscuro splendor (1994). His work does not make any major breaks with the art traditions of Europe, but does add new twists and even some elements that contradict the aesthetics of his main later influences of Cézanne and Matisse.

Works such as Las suecas, Bodegón rosa and Dos botellas show the fascination Gandía had for form and color and how the two interact. Poet Eliseo Diego wrote for the exhibition catalogue for the Palacio de Bellas Artes in 1988, “The work of Vicente Gandía is part of the best tradition of Spanish painting. Its starts out from real, solid things, and makes them glow from within, as though with the hidden splendor of their true essence.” His work shows detail and thought in his depiction of architecture, especially elements such as pillars, doors, windows, and the surrounding landscaping. Raquel Tibol wrote that he produced paintings of “excellent technique and musical delicacy, with a knowing balance between form and color.”
