= Letters from Marusia =

- Mexican Poster
- Directed by: Miguel Littín
- Written by: Miguel Littín; Patricio Manns; Freddy Taverna G.
- Produced by: Anuar Badin; Arturo Feliu
- Starring: Gian Maria Volonté
- Cinematography: Jorge Stahl Jr.
- Music by: Mikis Theodorakis
- Release date: 8 April 1976; (wide release)
- Running time: 110 minutes
- Country: Mexico
- Language: Spanish

Letters from Marusia (Spanish: Actas de Marusia) is a 1975 Mexican film directed by Chilean filmmaker Miguel Littín. It was nominated for the Academy Award for Best Foreign Language Film. It was also entered into the 1976 Cannes Film Festival. The film is based on a Patricio Manns novel (1974) inspired by the Marusia massacre of 1925.

== Plot ==
The film portrays the harsh reality of life for the working class during Chile's "Nitrate Era" (1880–1929), where efforts to form workers' unions were violently suppressed.

Set in a mining town in northern Chile, the Marusia massacre of 1925 unfolds. Government authorities sanction brutal violence against mine workers to maintain control for foreign companies exploiting resources. Despite some workers' resistance, the town is ultimately destroyed, and its residents are exterminated.

== Cast ==
- Gian Maria Volonté - Gregorio
- Diana Bracho - Luisa
- Claudio Obregón - Capt. Troncoso
- Eduardo López Rojas - Domingo Soto
- Patricia Reyes Spíndola - Rosa
- Salvador Sánchez - Sebastian
- Ernesto Gómez Cruz - Crisculo 'Medio Juan'
- Arturo Beristáin - Arturo
- Silvia Mariscal - Margarita
- Alejandro Parodi - Espinoza
- Patricio Castillo - Tte. Gaínza

== See also ==
- List of submissions to the 48th Academy Awards for Best Foreign Language Film
- List of Mexican submissions for the Academy Award for Best Foreign Language Film
