= Panamerican Machinery =

Maquinaria Panamericana
- Theatrical release poster
- Directed by: Joaquin del Paso
- Written by: Joaquin del Paso; Lucy Pawlak
- Produced by: Susana Bernal; Mauricio De La Garza; Santiago de la Paz; Joaquin del Paso; Marcin Malatynski; Jaime Romandia; Pawel Tarasiewicz; Joakim Ziegler
- Starring: Javier Zaragoza; Ramiro Orozco; Irene Ramirez
- Cinematography: Fredrik Olsson
- Edited by: Raúl Barreras
- Music by: Christian Paris
- Production companies: Amondo Films; Black Maria; FOPROCINE; Mantarraya Producciones; Estudios Churubusco; Terminal; Lodz Film School; IMCINE
- Release dates: February 14, 2016 (Berlinale); June 9, 2017 (Mexico)
- Running time: 86 minutes
- Countries: Mexico; Poland
- Language: Spanish

Panamerican Machinery (Spanish: Maquinaria Panamericana) is a 2016 Mexican-Polish absurdist comedy-drama film directed by Joaquin del Paso (in his directorial debut) and written by Del Paso & Lucy Pawlak. Starring Javier Zaragoza, Ramiro Orozco, and Irene Ramirez. The film was named on the shortlist for Mexican's entry for the Academy Award for Best International Feature Film at the 89th Academy Awards, but it was not selected.

== Synopsis ==
It seems like any other Friday at Maquinaria Panamericana S.A., a company specializing in the sale and repair of construction and destruction machinery. The employees prepare for the coveted weekend, wasting time on little rituals and routines, until an unexpected twist snaps them out of their peaceful monotony. Don Alejandro, the owner of the company, is found dead in a spare parts warehouse. The discovery changes everything: the company is bankrupt, the senior workers have no job prospects, and no one will receive compensation for their work. In a state of confusion, fear, and sadness, the workers decide to lock themselves in the company.

== Cast ==
The actors participating in this film are:

- Javier Zaragoza as Jesús Carlos
- Ramiro Orozco as Ignacio
- Irene Ramirez as Soledad
- Edmundo Mosqueira as Celestino
- Delfino López as Delfino
- César Panini as Golden Boy
- Javier Camacho as Rubio
- Israel Ruiz as Tonatiuh
- Regina DuPacci as Arancha
- Cecibon Garcia
- Maricarmen Piña
- Hilario Vega
- Tania Canciolla
- Efrén Esquivel
- Franco Legorreta
- Pedro Barbosa
- Eduardo Castrejón

== Release ==
The film had its international premiere on February 14, 2016, at the Berlin International Film Festival. It was commercially released on June 9, 2017, in Mexican theaters.

== Reception ==
=== Critical reception ===
On the review aggregator website Rotten Tomatoes, 91% of 11 critics' reviews are positive.

Jonathan Holland of The Hollywood Reporter wrote: "Modern Times and Bunuel apart, there’s a little of a lot of things in Panamerican Machinery. Absurdist, grotesque Lynchian comedy, as with the employer who strikes the ground with a metal rod in search of burst pipes, rubs up against the air of ‘70s countercultural protest movies, when anything went and when the satire wasn’t as subtle as it is today, and even with Lord of the Flies, as the staff considers murdering an intruder." Lucero Solórzano from the newspaper Excélsior wrote: "Panamerican Machinery portrays a very current reality in our country, mired in labor, political, social and economic conflicts that deeply affect morale, undermine hope and cause collective instability... It's a bewildering, hypnotic film, with a sense of humor that at times feels ruthless, but portrays who we are in the here and now."

=== Accolades ===
Year	Award	Category	Recipient	Result	Ref.
2016	Torino Film Festival	Special Mention - Feature Film	Joaquin del Paso & Amondo Films	Won	
2016	Raindance Film Festival	Best Screenplay	Joaquin del Paso & Lucy Pawlak	Won	
2016	Monterrey International Film Festival	Audience Award - Best Mexican Feature Film	Joaquin del Paso & Amondo Films	Won	
2016	Miami International Film Festival	Ibero-American Opera Prima Award - Best Film	Joaquin del Paso & Amondo Films	Nominated	
2016	Guanajuato International Film Festival	Best Feature	Panamerican Machinery	Won	
2016	Guadalajara International Film Festival	FIPRESCI Prize - Best Film	Joaquin del Paso	Won	
2016	Guadalajara International Film Festival	MEZCAL Award - Best Mexican Film	Joaquin del Paso	Won	
2016	Villa de Leyva International Independent Film Festival	Best Film	Panamerican Machinery	Won	
2016	Durango Film Festival	Audience Award - Best Film	Panamerican Machinery	Won	
2016	Durango Film Festival	Special Jury Commendation - Feature	Panamerican Machinery	Won	
2016	Berlin International Film Festival	Forum - Best Film	Panamerican Machinery	Nominated	
2017	Ariel Awards	Best First Work	Panamerican Machinery	Nominated	
2017	Ariel Awards	Best Original Screenplay	Joaquin del Paso & Lucy Pawlak	Won	
2017	Ariel Awards	Breakthrough Female Performance	Irene Ramirez	Nominated	
