= The 4th Company =

2016 film

- Theatrical release poster
- Directed by: Mitzi Vanessa Arreola; Amir Galván Cervera
- Written by: Mitzi Vanessa Arreola
- Starring: Adrian Ladron
- Release date: 6 March 2016 (GIFF)
- Running time: 109 minutes
- Country: Mexico
- Language: Spanish

The 4th Company (Spanish: La 4ª Compañía) is a 2016 Mexican-Spanish sports crime drama film directed by Mitzi Vanessa Arreola and Amir Galván Cervera. The film was named on the shortlist for Mexico's entry for the Academy Award for Best Foreign Language Film at the 89th Academy Awards but it was not selected. The 4th Company won the Ariel Award for Best Picture at the 59th Ariel Awards. Netflix distributed the film from 6 April 2018, but it subsequently departed the service in April 2021.

== Cast ==
- Adrian Ladron as Zambrano
- Andoni Gracia as Combate
- Hernán Mendoza as Palafox
- Gabino Rodríguez as Quinto
- Darío T. Pie as Florecita
- Manuel Ojeda as Chaparro
- Carlos Valencia as El Tripas
- Raymundo Reyes Moreno as Burrero

== Reception ==
On review aggregator website Rotten Tomatoes, the film holds an approval rating of 100%, based on 8 reviews, and an average rating of 6.7/10.
