= 7:19 =

2016 film

- Film poster
- Directed by: Jorge Michel Grau
- Written by: Jorge Michel Grau
- Starring: Demián Bichir
- Release date: 23 September 2016
- Running time: 94 minutes
- Country: Mexico
- Language: Spanish
- Box office: $173,756

7:19 is a 2016 Mexican drama film directed by Jorge Michel Grau. It was named on the shortlist for Mexico's entry for the Academy Award for Best Foreign Language Film at the 89th Academy Awards, but was not selected.

== Plot ==
A group of office building workers are called in early and the 1985 Mexico City earthquake occurs causing the building to collapse and kill them. Fernando, a worker wakes up trapped by a beam pinning him and sees Martin, a guard trapped to his desk they hear other survivors including Nadia a janitor and Carlos and Juan two workers. They encounter various situations where they learn of the earthquake via a radio. Soon after, an aftershock occurs killing Carlos and crushing Fernando further, all while pushing Martin off his desk. Once rescuers start looking for survivors, the survivors are instructed to make noise so that the rescuers can find them. They are not heard by the rescuers. Afterwards, an excavator starts moving the rubble, causing it to collapse further, killing Martin and Fernando. Offscreen, janitor Nadia survives the collapsed rubble.

== Cast ==
- Demián Bichir as Fernando Pellicer
- Héctor Bonilla as Martin Soriano
