= The Alien (2016 film) =

2016 film

- Film poster
- Directed by: Jesús Magaña Vázquez
- Written by: Jesús Magaña Vázquez
- Starring: Juan Ugarte
- Release date: September 2016
- Country: Mexico
- Language: Spanish

The Alien (Spanish: El Alien y yo) is a 2016 Mexican comedy film directed by Jesús Magaña Vázquez. The film was named on the shortlist for Mexico's entry for the Academy Award for Best Foreign Language Film at the 89th Academy Awards, but it was not selected.

== Plot ==
Lauro, Rita and Agus have formed a punk rock band, that is not very successful. To change things up, they enlist Pepe, a very talented keyboard player, a boy with down syndrome, whom they call "The alien".

Thanks to Pepe, they achieve great success, much to the jealousy of Lauro.

== Cast ==
- Juan Ugarte as Agus
- Inés de Tavira as Rita
- Juan Pablo Campa as Lauro
- Paco de la Fuente as Pepe - the Alien
