= Warehoused =

2015 film

- Film poster
- Directed by: Jack Zagha Kababie
- Starring: José Carlos Ruiz; Hoze Meléndez
- Release date: 29 October 2015 (FICM)
- Running time: 93 minutes
- Country: Mexico
- Language: Spanish

Warehoused (Spanish: Almacenados) is a 2015 Mexican comedy-drama film directed by Jack Zagha Kababie and written by David Desola. It based on a novel by David Desola.
