= List of Mexican films of 2023 =

This is a list of Mexican films released in 2023.

English title	Original title	Director	Cast	Genre	Notes
The (Almost) Legends	Los (casi) ídolos de Bahía Colorada	Ricardo Castro Velazquez	Benny Emmanuel, Emiliano Torres, Harold Azuara, Raúl Gabriel Morales Ramírez, Nora Velázquez, Guillermo Quintanilla, Dagoberto Gama, Silverio Palacios, Ana Celeste, Esmeralda Soto, Diego Sandoval Montes, César Castillo, Juan Andrés Belgrave, Paulina de Labra, Edith Nuñez, Amanda Polo, Julio Patricio, Carmen García, Gaby Navarro, Víctor Quintero, Alexander Show, Karem Momo, Chùy Gallardo, Ana Chiquete, Mario Zamacona, Francisco Pita, Eduardo Ángel Bravo	Comedy	Premiered on July 19 on Netflix
Asedio		Miguel Ángel Vivas	Natalia de Molina, Bella Agossou, Oscar Eribo, Francisco Reyes, Fran Cantos, Chani Martín, Jorge Kent	Action, Thriller	In co-production with Spain Premiered on September 21 in Mexican theaters
At Midnight		Jonah Feingold	Diego Boneta, Monica Barbaro, Anders Holm, Whitney Cummings, Catherine Cohen, Casey Thomas Brown, Maya Zapata, Fernando Carsa, Ricardo Esquerra, Matt Ramos	Romantic comedy	Premiered on February 10 on Paramount+
Before the Buzzards Arrive	Antes que lleguen los zopilotes	Jonás N. Díaz	María del Carmen Félix, Tsayamhall Esquivel, Francisco Pita	Black-and-white, Mystery, Fantasy	Nominated - VPRO Big Screen Award at the 2023 Rotterdam International Film Festival Nominated - Best Feature Film at the 2023 San Diego Latino Film Festival Winner - Best Feature Film Cinematography, Best Drama Film & Best Production Design at the 2023 European Cinematography Awards
Diary of an Unexpected Journey	Diario de un viaje inesperado	Paco Alvarez	Getsemaní Vela, Xabiani Ponce de León, Kevin Holt, Carlos Corona, Moisés Arizmendi, Martha Claudia Moreno, Barbie Casillas	Romance, Comedy-drama, Road Movie	Premiered on April 20 in Mexican theaters
The Echo	El eco	Tatiana Huezo	Montserrat Hernández Hernández, María de los Ángeles Pacheco Tapia, Luz María Vázquez González, Sarahí Rojas Hernández, William Antonio Vázquez González, Uriel Hernández Hernández, Ramiro Hernández Hernández, Berenice Cortés Muñoz, Andrea González Lima	Documentary	Winner - Berlinale Documentary Film Award & Best Director at the 73rd Berlin International Film Festival Nominated - Golden Bear Plaque at the 73rd Berlin International Film Festival
Familia		Rodrigo García	Daniel Giménez Cacho, Ilse Salas, Cassandra Ciangherotti, Natalia Solián, Ángeles Cruz, Maribel Verdú, Ricardo Selmen, Vicky Araico, Brian Shortall, Isabella Gallegos Arroyo, Andrea Sutton, Zury Jacobo Shasho, Natalia Plascencia, Adolfo Mendoza Madera, Jessie Valcin, Fernando Álvarez Rebeil	Drama	Premiered on December 15 on Netflix
Friends Till Death	Amigos hasta la muerte	Javier Veiga	Javier Veiga, Marta Hazas, Mauricio Ochmann, Luna Gallego, Nacho Nugo, Óscar Allo, Xosé A. Touriñán, David Amor, Ledicia Sola, Xoel López, Fele Martínez, Mela Casal	Comedy-drama	In co-production with Spain Winner - Best Director & Best Actor for Javier Veiga at the 20th Alicante International Film Festival Nominated - Best First Film at the Almería International Film Festival Nominated - Best Film, Best Actor for Javier Veiga, Best Actress for Marta Hazas & Best Cinematography Nominated - Best Original Song for "Eco" – Xoel López at the 38th Goya Awards
Good Savage	Buen salvaje	Santiago Mohar Volkow	Manuel Garcia-Rulfo, Naian Gonzalez Norvid, Darío Yaxbek Vernal, Andrew Leland Rogers, Alejandro Edda, Aldo Escalante Ochoa	Black comedy, Satire	Nominated - Hecho en Jalisco - Best Film at the 39th Guadalajara International Film Festival
The Great Seduction	La gran seducción	Celso R. García	Memo Villegas, Pierre Louis, Yalitza Aparicio, Mercedes Hernández, Eligio Meléndez, Julio Casado, Héctor Jiménez, Mateo Negrete	Comedy	Spanish-language remake of the 2003 film Seducing Doctor Lewis Premiered on August 30 on Netflix
Heroic	Heroico	David Zonana	Santiago Sandoval Carbajal, Esteban Caicedo, Fernando Cuautle, Mónica del Carmen, Carlos Gerardo García, Isabel Yudice	Thriller, Drama	Premiered on January 21 at the 2023 Sundance Film Festival
How to Kill Mom	¿Cómo matar a mamá?	José Ramón Chávez	Ximena Sariñana, Diana Bovio, Ana Valeria Becerril, Blanca Guerra, Erick Elías, Gonzalo Vega Jr., Antonio Gaona, Elizabeth Guindi, Mau Nieto	Road Movie, Comedy-drama	Premiered on May 10 in Mexican theaters
Human Resources	Recursos humanos	Jesús Magaña Vázquez	Pedro de Tavira, Juana Viale, Giuseppe Gamba, Daniel Tovar, Cecilia Ponce, Natalia Barraud, Hernán Sevilla, Camila Murias, Hernán Sevilla, Camila Murias, María Julia Denna, Salvador Ferrer, Alejandra Herrera, Ulises Bueno, Gonzalo Lavisse	Black comedy, Comedy-drama	Premiered on October 24 at the 21st Morelia International Film Festival Released on November 16 in Mexican theaters
I Don't Expect Anyone to Believe Me	No voy a pedirle a nadie que me crea	Fernando Frías de la Parra	Darío Yazbek, Natalia Solián, Alexis Ayala, Anna Castillo, Carmen Beato, Juan Minujín	Thriller, Drama	Premiered on October 22 at the 21st Morelia International Film Festival Released on November 22 on Netflix
Like or Die	Señora influencer	Carlos Santos	Mónica Huarte, Renata Molinar, Diana Carreiro, Memo Dorantes, Macarena García, Leonardo Daniel, Bárbara Lombardo, Mau Nieto, Daniela Peña, Sandra Burgos, Christian Uribe, Michelle Durán, Ángel Escarcega, Michael Cohn, Alejandro de la Madrid, Paola Rojas	Satire, Black comedy, Comedy thriller	Premiered on October 23 at the 21st Morelia International Film Festival
Lost in the Night	Perdidos en la noche	Amat Escalante	Juan Daniel García Treviño, Ester Expósito, Bárbara Mori, Fernando Bonilla, María Fernanda Osio, Jero Medina, Vicky Araico, Mayra Hermosillo, Alfonso Zamacona	Mystery, Thriller	Premiered on May 18 in the Cannes Premiere section at the 76th Cannes Film Festival.
Have a Nice Day!	¿Encontró lo que buscaba?	Yibrán Asuad	Álvaro Guerrero, Andrea Chaparro, Eduardo Minett, Sidney Robote, Fernando Larragaña, Alejandro Suárez, Lalo El Mimo, Ma Eugenia Guzmán, Juan Alberto Villareal, Perfecto González, Andrés C Mayer, Ana Sofía Gatica, Saak, Juca Viapri, Fer Manzano, María Tlapanco	Comedy-drama	Premiered on March 10 on Netflix
Unhappily Ever After	Infelices para siempre	Noé Santillán-López	Adrián Uribe, Consuelo Duval, Angélica Aragón, Livia Brito	Romantic comedy	Premiered on January 26 in Mexican theaters
Mother's Day Is Cancelled	¡Hasta la madre del Día de las Madres!	Javier Colinas	Gala Montes, Michel Duval, Anette Michel, Leticia Huijara, Axel Trujillo, Alejandro Camacho, Kenneth Lavill, Giovanna Reynaud, Diego Meléndez, Ignacio Guadalupe	Comedy	Premiered on May 5 on Amazon Prime Video
The Movie	La película	Max del Río	Martín Méndez, Asaf Berrón, Jorge Castro Realpozo, Addy Arceo, Hernán Castelot, Francisco Elox, Juan Amaro	Comedy	First feature film entirely made in Campeche Winner - Audience Award at the 7th 24 Risas por Segundo International Film and Comedy Festival Released on September 12, 2024, in Mexican theaters
¡Que viva México!		Luis Estrada	Alfonso Herrera, Damián Alcázar, Joaquín Cosío, Ana de la Reguera	Comedy, Political satire	Premiered on March 23 in Mexican theaters
¿Quieres ser mi hijo?		Ihtzi Hurtado	Ludwika Paleta, Juanpa Zurita, Hernán Mendoza, Harold Azuara, Agustín Arana	Romantic comedy	Premiered on September 21 on Vix+
Radical		Christopher Zalla	Eugenio Derbez, Daniel Haddad, Jennifer Trejo, Mia Fernanda Solis, Danilo Guardiola, Víctor Estrada	Comedy-drama	Winner - Festival Favorite Award at the 2023 Sundance Film Festival
El sabor de la Navidad		Alejandro Lozano	Mariana Treviño, Andrés Almeida, Monica Dionne, Juan Carlos Medellín, Armando Hernandez, Marco Treviño, Jerry Velázquez, Pamela Almanza.	Comedy-drama	Premiered on September 11 on Toronto International Film Festival.
Sorcery	Brujería	Christopher Murray	Valentina Véliz, Daniel Antivilo, Sebastian Hülk, Daniel Muñoz, Neddiel Muñoz Millalonco	Fantasy, Drama	Nominated - World Film Dramatic Competition at the 2023 Sundance Film Festival Nominated - Dragon Award - International Competition at the 2023 Göteborg Film Festival
Surviving My Quinceañera	Sobreviviendo mis XV	Chava Cartas	Berenice Jonguitud, Guillermo Villegas, Verónica Bravo, Lupita Lara, Paco Luna, Sofía Carrera, Juan Pablo Fuentes, Farah Justiniani, Hanssel Casillas	Comedy	Premiered on September 21 in Mexican theaters
Three Sparks		Naomi Uman		Documentary	Nominated - Tiger Award at the 2023 International Film Festival Rotterdam
Tótem		Lila Avilés	Naíma Sentíes, Montserrat Marañón, Marisol Gasé, Saori Gurza, Teresita Sánchez, Mateo García Elizondo, Juan Francisco Maldonado, Iazua Larios, Alberto Amador	Drama	An international co-production with Denmark & France Winner - Prize of the Ecumenical Jury at the 73rd Berlin International Film Festival Nominated - Golden Bear at the 73rd Berlin International Film Festival Winner - Firebird Award at the Hong Kong International Film Festival
Valentina or the Serenity	Valentina o la Serenidad	Ángeles Cruz	Danae Ahuja, Myriam Bravo, Alexander Gadiel Mendoza Sánchez.	Drama	Premiered on September 8 on Toronto International Film Festival.
Where the Tracks End	El último vagón	Ernesto Contreras	Adriana Barraza, Kaarlo Isaacs, Memo Villegas, Diego Montessoro, Frida Cruz, Ikal Paredes, Teté Espinoza, Jeronimo Medina, Gabriela Cartol, Nova Coronel, Adrián Vázquez, Leonardo Alonso, Fátima Molina, Sofía Domínguez Corte, Osvani Rivera, Victoria Díaz, Blanca Guerra	Comedy-drama	Premiered on May 26 on Netflix

== See also ==
- List of 2023 box office number-one films in Mexico
