= 66th Ariel Awards =

2024 Mexican film awards

- Official poster
- Date: 7 September 2024
- Site: Teatro Degollado; Guadalajara, Mexico
- Hosted by: Michelle Rodríguez

Highlights
- Best Picture: Tótem
- Best Actor: Noé Hernández; Kokoloko
- Best Actress: Adriana Llabrés; All the Silence
- Most awards: Tótem (5)
- Most nominations: Tótem (15)

The 66th Ariel Awards ceremony, presented by the Mexican Academy of Cinematographic Arts and Sciences, took place at the Teatro Degollado in Guadalajara, Jalisco on 7 September 2024. The ceremony was broadcast live on TNT América Latina, Canal 11, Jalisco TV, Canal 22 and, for the first time, through the streaming platform Max.

The 186 nominations, divided into 24 categories, were announced on 19 June 2024, by actresses Arcelia Ramírez and Fiona Palomo. Of the nominated films, 17 had received public support in their production and distribution from organizations such as EFICINE, FOCINE, ECAMC, FONCA and IMCINE. Lila Avilés' second film, Tótem, led with 15 nominations, followed by David Zonana's Heroic and Elisa Miller's Hurricane Season with 11. Tótem went on to win five awards, more than any other film in the ceremony, including Best Picture. For this edition, the Golden Ariel was awarded to production designer Brigitte Broch, filmmaker and screenwriter Busi Cortés as well as actress and singer Angélica María.

== Winners and nominees ==
Winners are listed first, highlighted in boldface, and indicated with a double dagger (‡).

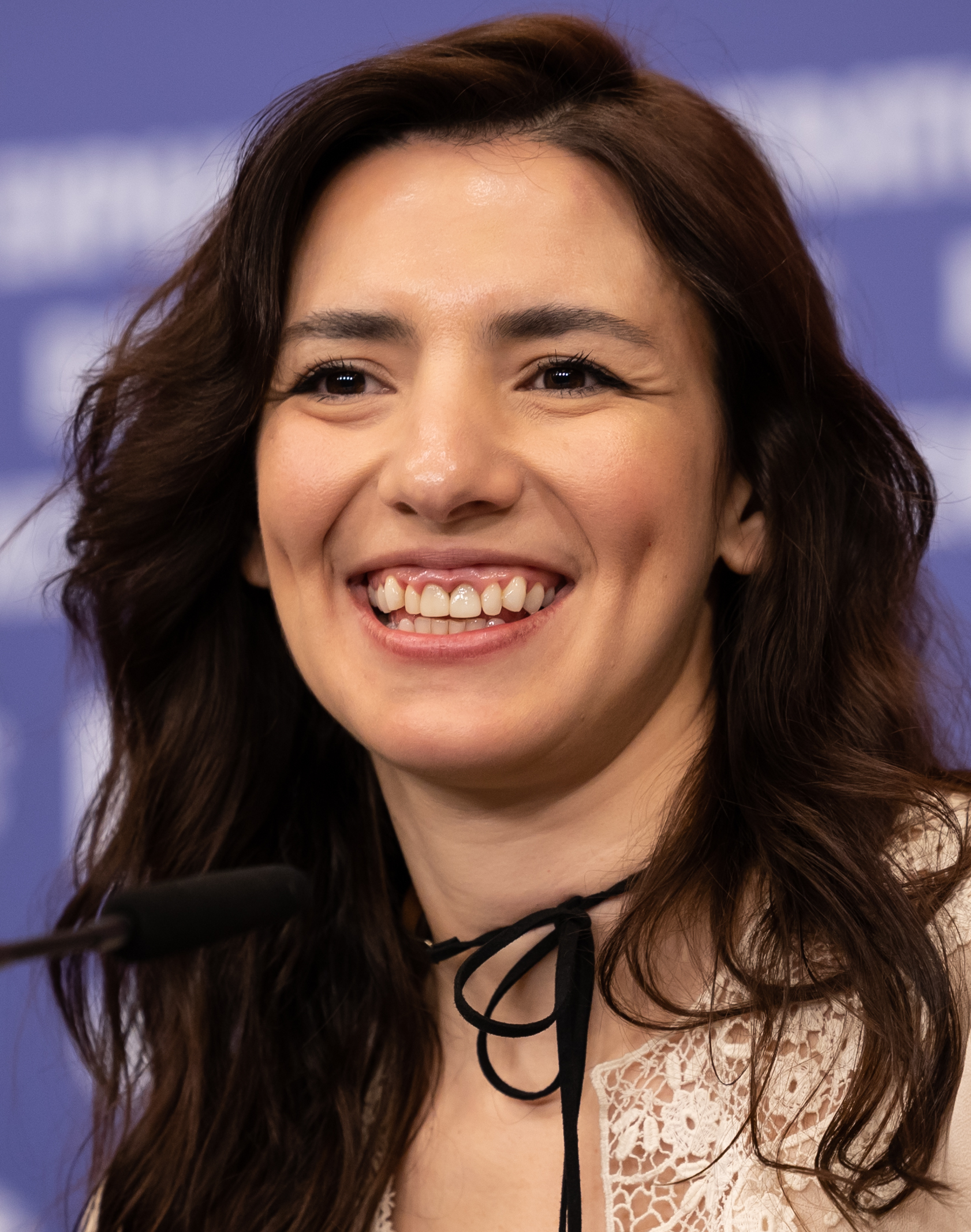
Lila Avilés, Best Director and Best Original Screenplay winner

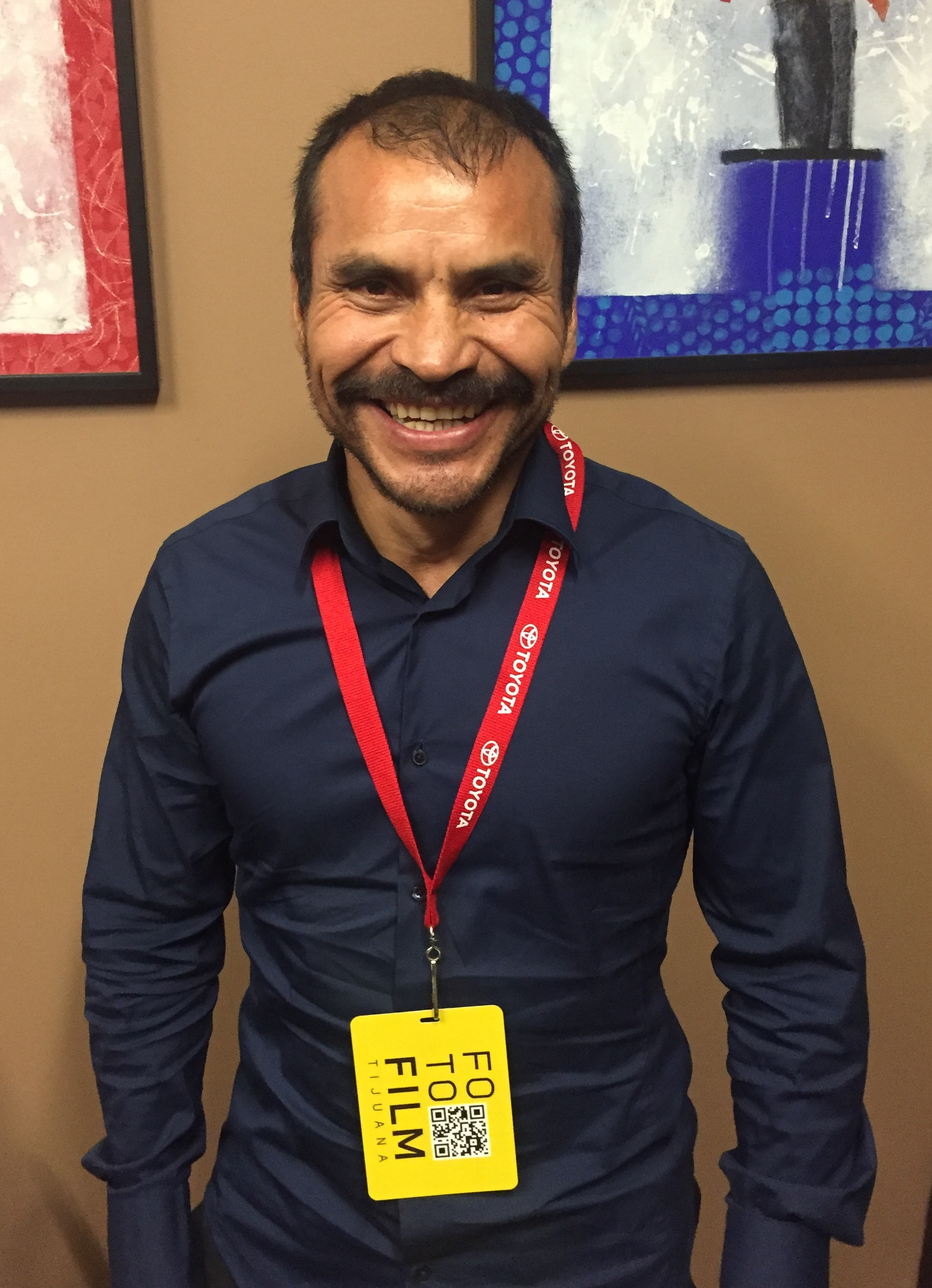
Noé Hernández, Best Actor winner

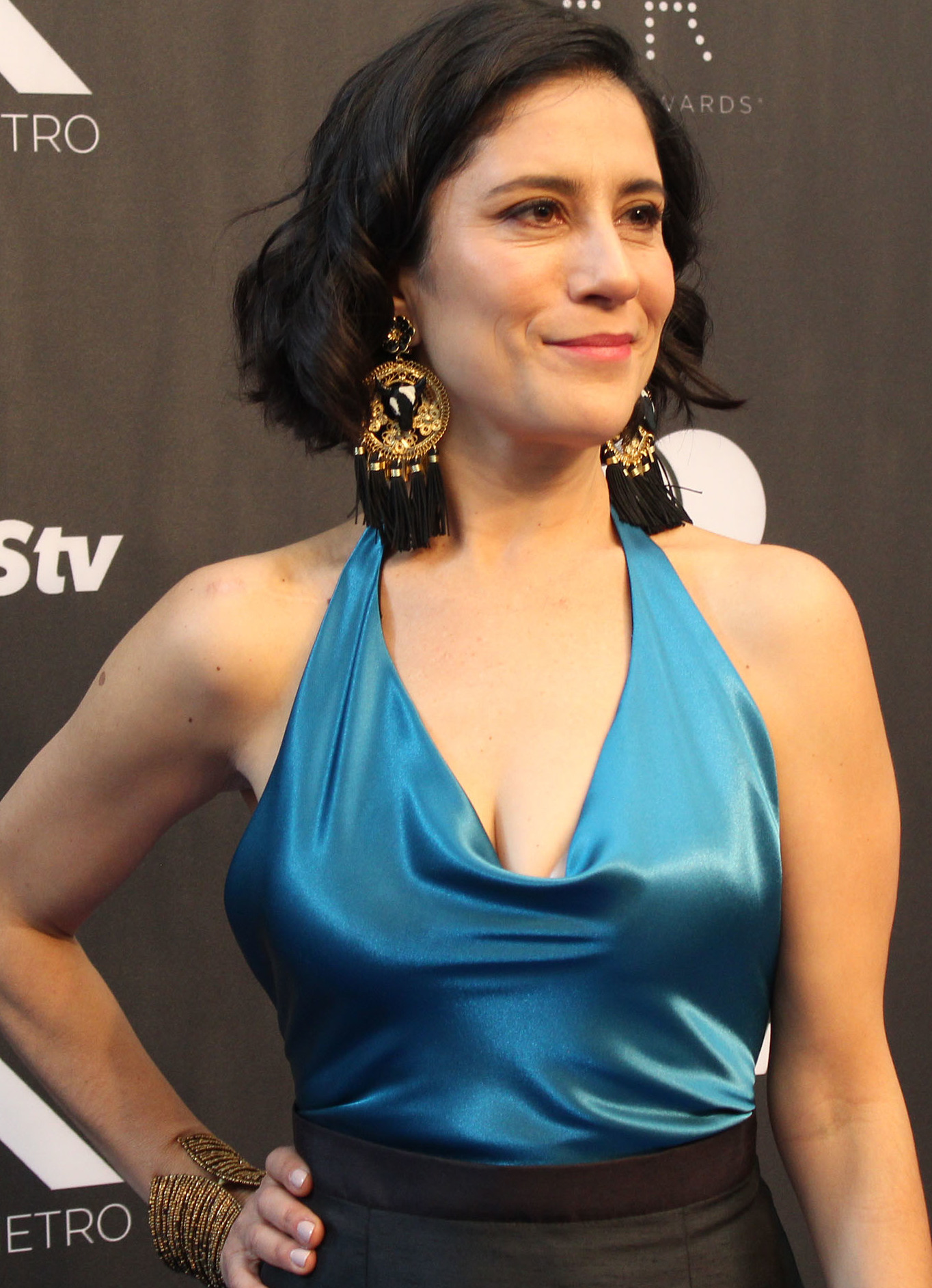
Montserrat Marañón, Best Supporting Actress co-winner

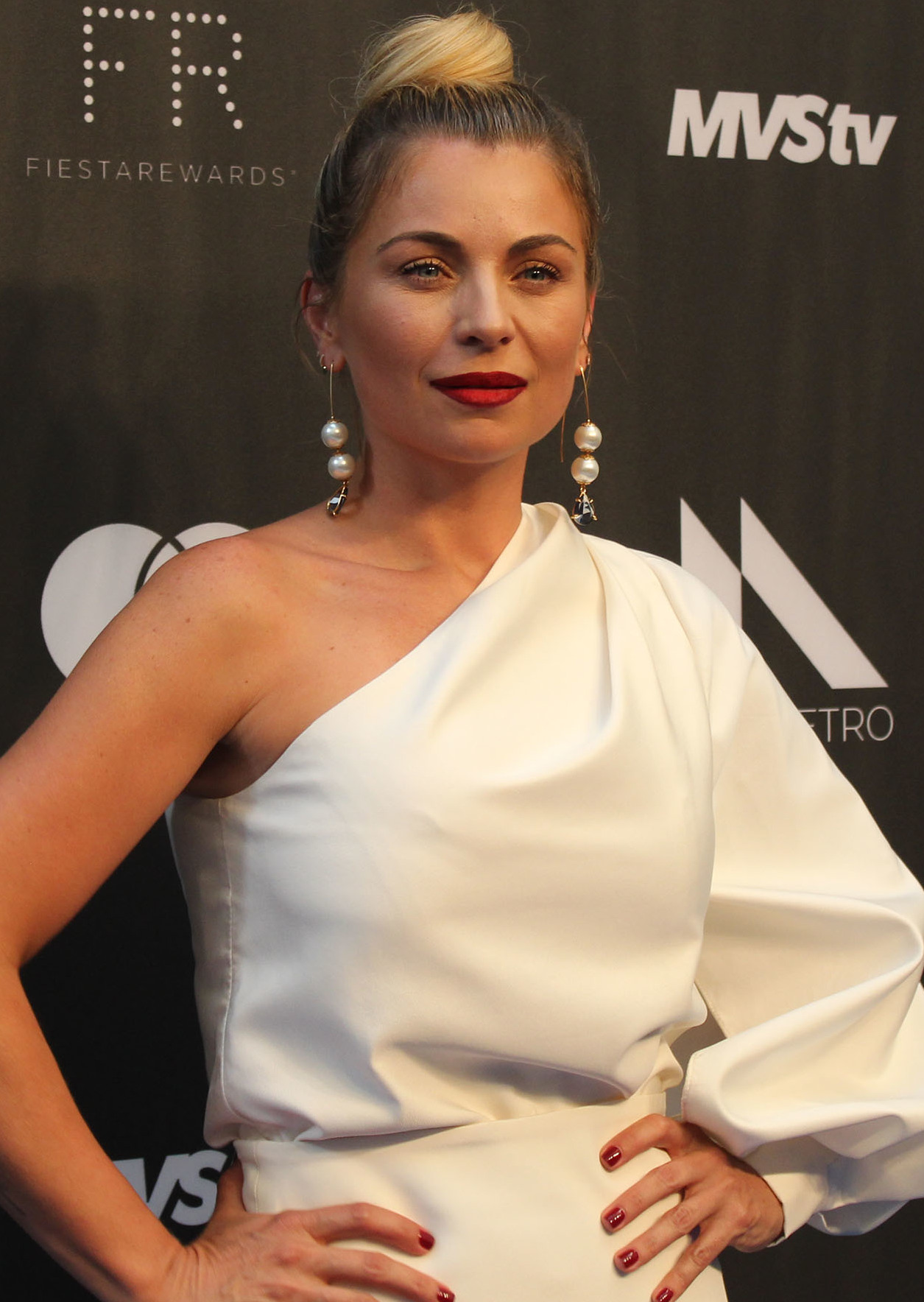
Ludwika Paleta, Best Supporting Actress co-winner

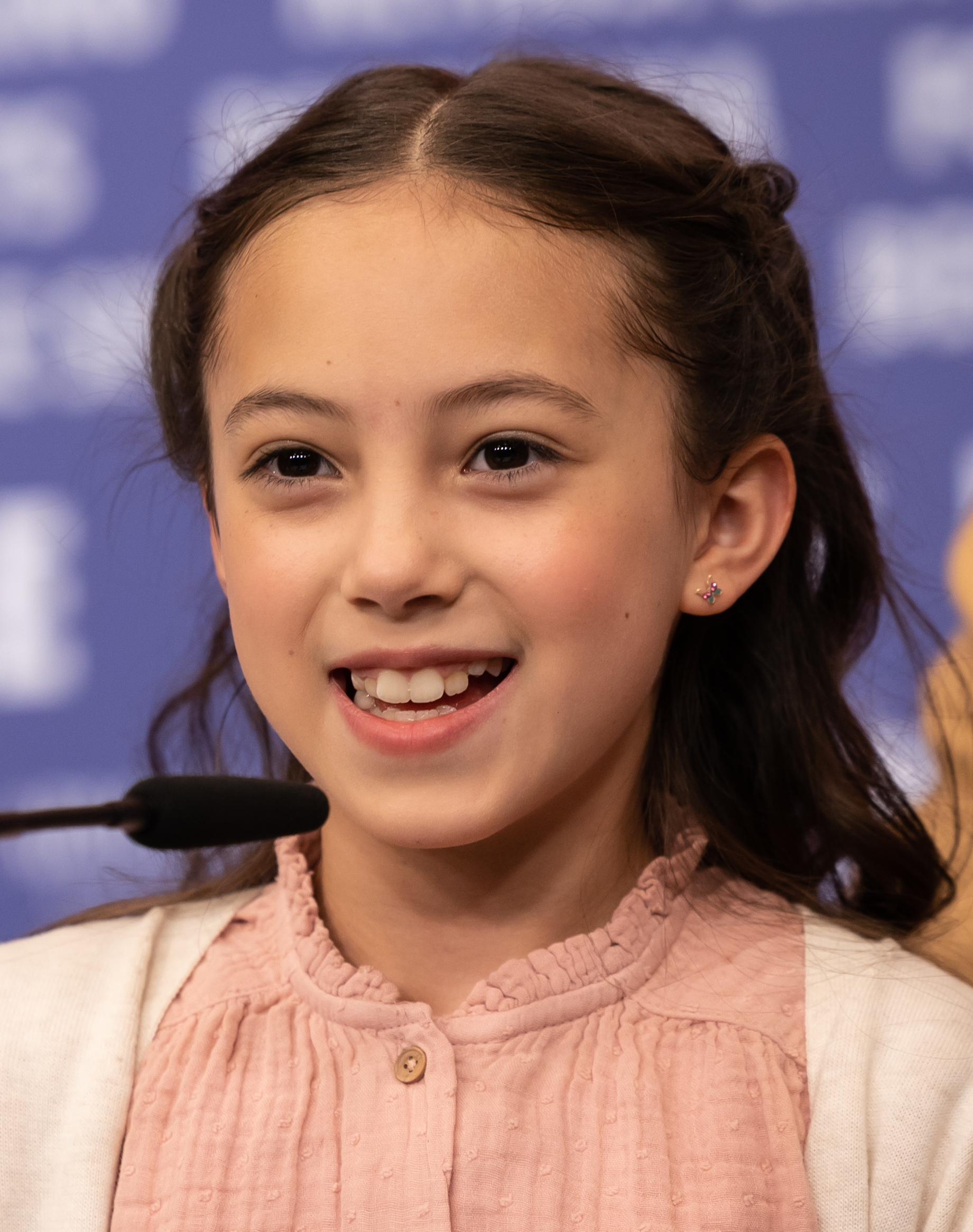
Naíma Sentíes, Best Breakthrough Performance winner

**Best Picture**: **Tótem – Limerencia Films, Laterna, Paloma Productions, Alpha Violet Producción. Dir. Lila Avilés**‡; All the Silence – Animal de Luz Films and This Is Why Cinema. Dir. Diego del Río; The Echo – Radiola Films. Dir. Tatiana Huezo; Heroic – New Fiction Films. Dir. David Zonana; Hurricane Season – Redrum 15. Dir. Elisa Miller	**Best Director**: **Lila Avilés – Tótem**‡; Rodrigo García – Familia; Tatiana Huezo – The Echo; Elisa Miller – Hurricane Season; David Zonana – Heroic
**Best Actress**: **Adriana Llabrés – All the Silence**‡; Adriana Barraza – Where the Tracks End; Cassandra Ciangherotti – Familia; Ilse Salas – Familia; Mónica Huarte – Like or Die	**Best Actor**: **Noé Hernández – Kokoloko**‡; Daniel Giménez Cacho – Familia; Harold Torres – Disappear Completely; Pablo de Tavira Egurrola – Human Resources; Juan Daniel García Treviño – Lost in the Night
**Best Supporting Actress**: **Montserrat Marañón – Tótem**‡; **Ludwika Paleta – All the Silence**‡; Myriam Bravo – Valentina or the Serenity; Marisol Gasé – Tótem; Teresa Sánchez – Tótem	**Best Supporting Actor**: **Fernando Cuautle – Heroic**‡; Juan Manuel Bernal – Confesiones; Humberto Busto – Martínez; Julio César Cedillo – Upon Open Sky; Mateo García Elizondo – Tótem
**Best Breakthrough Performance**: **Naíma Sentíes – Tótem**‡; Danae Ahuja Aparicio – Valentina or the Serenity; Ikal Paredes – Where the Tracks End; Rocío de la Mañana – Adolfo; Santiago Sandaval Carvajal – Heroic; Saori Gurza – Tótem	**Best Original Screenplay**: **Lila Avilés – Tótem**‡; Ángeles Cruz – Valentina or the Serenity; David Zonana – Heroic; Guillermo Arriaga – Upon Open Sky; Lucía Carreras – All the Silence
**Best Adapted Screenplay**: **Elisa Miller and Daniela Gómez – Hurricane Season**‡; Fernando Frías de la Parra and María Camila Arias – I Don't Expect Anyone to Believe Me; Hugo Hiriart and Guita Schyfter – The Eagle and the Worm; Javier Peñalosa – Where the Tracks End; Jesús Magaña Vázquez, Fernando del Razo and Antonio Ortuño – Human Resources	**Best Cinematography**: **Ernesto Pardo – The Echo**‡; Carolina Costa – Heroic; Damián García – I Don't Expect Anyone to Believe Me; Diego Tenorio – Tótem; Glauco Bermúdez – Disappear Completely; María José Secco – Hurricane Season
**Best Original Music**: **Leonardo Heiblum and Jacobo Lieberman – The Echo**‡; Alejandro Otaola – Disappear Completely; Andrés Sánchez Maher, Keit Javier Reyes Osorio "Konk Reyes" and Adan Samuel Romero Ramiréz "Haxah" – A Wolfpack Called Ernesto; Héctor Ruiz – Hurricane Season; Ludovico Einaudi – Upon Open Sky; Zulu González and Estéban Aldrete – Have a Nice Day!	**Best Costume Design**: **Gabriela Fernández – Heroic**‡; Jimena Fernández and Nora Solís – Tótem; Laura García de la Mora – Where the Tracks End; Mariestela Fernández – Familia; Úrsula Schneider – Hurricane Season
**Best Art Direction**: **Ivonne Fuentes – Heroic**‡; Alisarine Ducolomb – Disappear Completely; Antonio Muñohierro – Where the Tracks End; Carlos Y. Jacques – Hurricane Season; Nohemí González – Tótem	**Best Visual Effects**: **Gustavo Bellón, Thomas Boda, René Allegretti Zambrano, Jesús Corrales Clark, Jorge Palma and Javier Velázquez Dorantes – Disappear Completely**‡; Mario Raúl Villegas Rojano, Pablo Ángeles Zuman – Teques Chainsaw Massacre; Nicolás González, Ignacio Pol, Pablo Accamee, Enrique Cantú Garza V and Fernando Campos – Human Resources; Peter Hjorth, Roberto Galindo Rivera and Mikael Windelin – Lost in the Night; Víctor Valencia – Hurricane Season
**Best Makeup**: **Alejandra Velarde – Hurricane Season**‡; Adam Zoller Duplan – Disappear Completely; Gerardo Muñoz – Teques Chainsaw Massacre; Tania Aguilera – Heroic; Vanessa Coty – Tótem	**Best Sound**: **Miguel Hernández, Mario Martínez Cobos and Liliana Villaseñor – All the Silence**‡; Carlos E. García, Raúl Locatelli and Michel Schöpping – Lost in the Night; José Miguel Enríquez, António Pórem Pires and Federico González Jordán – Disappear Completely; Lena Esquenazi, Martin de Torcy, Jaime Baksht and Michelle Couttolenc – The Echo; Raúl Locatelli and Erik Clauss – Heroic; Rune Palving, Daniel Rojo Solís and Guido Berenblum – Tótem; Sergio Díaz, Pablo Tamez Sierra and Carlos Cortés Navarrete – Hurricane Season
**Best Special Effects**: **Goyo Vega, Adam Zoller Duplán and Rocío Espinosa Valdés – Disappear Completely**‡; Gerardo Muñoz – Teques Chainsaw Massacre; José Martínez – All the Fires; José Martínez – Where the Tracks End; Lanfranco Buratini, Esteban Parodi, Nico Crespo and Jano Ubierna – Human Resources	**Best First Work**: **All the Silence – Diego del Río**‡; Adolfo – Sofía Auza; Daughter of Rage – Laura Baumeister; Martínez – Lorena Padilla; Upon Open Sky – Mariana Arriaga and Santiago Arriaga
**Best Documentary Feature**: **The Echo – Tatiana Huezo**‡; The Darkness Within La Luz del Mundo – Carlos Pérez Osorio; The Lady of Silence: The Mataviejitas Murders – María José Cuevas; M20 Matamoros Ejido 20 – Leonor Maldonado García; A Wolfpack Called Ernesto – Everardo González	**Best Editing**: **Paulina del Paso and Miguel Schverdfinger – Hurricane Season**‡; Lucrecia Gutiérrez and Tatiana Huezo – The Echo; Omar Guzmán – Tótem; Óscar Figueroa Jara – Heroic; Yibrán Asuad – Familia
**Best Documentary Short Film**: **Norte – Natalia Bermúdez**‡; Charrascas – Carlos Hernández Vázquez; Huachinango rojo – Cinthya Lizbeth Toledo Cabrera; KeMonito: La última caída – Teresa de Miguel Escribano; Yaxche'oob – Pablo Cruz Villalba	**Best Animated Short Film**: **Humo – Rita Basulto**‡; Camille – Denise Raquel Roldán Alcalá; La canción del lago – Carlos Alberto Sallas Becerra and Beatriz Ariana Navarrete Ledesma; Emme y sus días mutantes – Diego Acevedo; Nube – Diego Alonso Sánchez de la Barquera Estrada and Christian Arredondo Narváez; La vieja y el cuerpo – María Lucía Bayardo Dodge
**Best Ibero-American Film**: **Society of the Snow – J. A. Bayona (Spain)**‡; Behind the Mist – Sebastián Cordero (Ecuador); La hembrita – Laura Amelia Guzmán (Dominican Republic); Puan – María Alché and Benjamín Naishtat (Argentina); The Settlers – Felipe Gálvez (Chile)	**Best Fiction Short Film**: **Apnea – Natalia Bermúdez**‡; Ángel – Hoze Meléndez; Chica de fábrica – Selma Cervantes; El color de la habitación – Iván Löwenberg; Patrona – Fanie Soto
**Golden Ariel**: **Brigitte Broch**; **Busi Cortés**; **Angélica María**

=== Films with multiple nominations ===
The following films received multiple nominations:

Nominations	Films
15	Tótem
11	Heroic
11	Hurricane Season
8	Disappear Completely
7	The Echo
6	All the Silence
6	Familia
6	Where the Tracks End
4	Upon Open Sky
4	Human Resources
3	Lost in the Night
3	Martínez
3	Teques Chainsaw Massacre
3	Valentina or the Serenity
2	Adolfo
2	A Wolfpack Called Ernesto
2	I Don't Expect Anyone to Believe Me

=== Films with multiple wins ===
The following films received multiple wins:

Wins	Films
5	Tótem
4	All the Silence
3	The Echo
3	Heroic
3	Hurricane Season
2	Disappear Completely

== See also ==
- 96th Academy Awards
- 12th Canadian Screen Awards
- 81st Golden Globe Awards
- 38th Goya Awards
- 11th Platino Awards
- 18th Sur Awards
