= List of Mexican films of 2011 =

This is a list of Mexican films released in 2011.

Title	Director	Cast	Genre	Notes
La cebra	Fernando Javier León Rodríguez	Harold Torres, Jorge Adrián Espíndola, Leticia Huijara, Paulina Gaitán, Alejandra Ley, Jesús Ochoa, Raquel Pankowsky, Graciela Orozco, Alejandro Caso, Hermán López, Tomás Rojas, Humberto Elizondo, Julián Villagrán, Manolo Solo, Raúl Adalid, Emilio Savinni, Meraqui Rodríguez, Héctor Holten	Comedy-drama	
The Language of the Machetes	Kyzza Terrazas	Jessy Bulbo, Andres Almeida, Flor Eduarda Gurrola	Drama film	One of the most anticipated Mexican films of 2011.
Malaventura	Michel Lipkes			
Miss Bala	Gerardo Naranjo	Stephanie Sigman, Noe Hernandez	Crime drama	
My Universe in Lower Case	Hatuey Viveros			

== See also ==
- List of 2011 box office number-one films in Mexico
