= Hurricane Season (2023 film) =

2023 film by Elisa Miller

- Theatrical release poster
- Spanish: Temporada de huracanes
- Directed by: Elisa Miller
- Screenplay by: Daniela Gómez; Elisa Miller
- Based on: Hurricane Season by Fernanda Melchor
- Starring: Edgar Treviño; Paloma Alvamar; Gustavo Morales; Kat Rigoni; Ernesto Meléndez; Andrés Córdova
- Cinematography: María Secco
- Edited by: Paulina Del Paso; Miguel Schverdfinger
- Music by: Héctor Ruiz
- Production company: Woo Films
- Distributed by: Netflix
- Release dates: 21 October 2023 (FICM); 1 November 2023 (Netflix)
- Running time: 99 minutes
- Country: Mexico
- Language: Spanish

Hurricane Season (Spanish: Temporada de huracanes) is a 2023 Mexican drama film directed by Elisa Miller, from a screenplay she wrote with Daniela Gómez. It is based on the 2017 novel of the same name by Fernanda Melchor. The film begins with a group of teenagers who discover the corpse of La Bruja, a woman respected and feared by the community, floating in a canal near the village of La Matosa in the state of Veracruz.

The film premiered on 21 October 2023 at the Morelia International Film Festival, where Miller and Gómez won the Best Screenplay award. It was released on Netflix on 1 November 2023. It received 11 nominations at the 66th Ariel Awards, and won 3 awards: Best Adapted Screenplay, Best Editing and Best Makeup.

== Plot ==
In the village of La Matosa, a group of teenagers find the body of La Bruja, a woman both respected and feared by the community, floating in a canal. The events leading up to her murder are explored in five acts, titled for different characters and focusing on their perspectives and involvement, to produce a layered and non-linear narrative that gradually reveals the dark secrets of their town and its inhabitants.

== Cast ==
- Edgar Treviño as La Bruja
- Paloma Alvamar as Yesenia
- Gustavo Morales as Munra
- Kat Rigoni as Norma
- Ernesto Meléndez as Brando
- Andrés Córdova as Luismi
- Conchi León as Chiquis

== Production ==
After reading the novel, the director Elisa Miller sought to obtain the screen rights to the work, and together with Daniela Gómez she was in charge of writing the screenplay. The film was part of the Que México se vea initiative, a Netflix project focused on promoting Mexican cinema. The film adaptation was first announced by Netflix in April 2022. Produced by Mexico's Woo Films, principal photography began in summer 2022. It was filmed over six weeks in the state of Tabasco, including in the municipalities of Paraíso, Jalpa de Méndez, Nacajuca, Teapa, Cárdenas and Centla. The cast includes many actors with theatre backgrounds who are performing in their first film roles.

== Release ==
Hurricane Season was selected to compete in the Mexican Feature Film section of the 21st Morelia International Film Festival, where the film had its world premiere on 21 October 2023. It was given a limited theatrical release before being released on Netflix on 1 November 2023.

== Reception ==
=== Critical response ===
On the review aggregator website Rotten Tomatoes, the film holds an approval rating of 80% based on 5 reviews, with an average rating of 7/10.

=== Accolades ===
Award	Date of ceremony	Category	Recipient(s)	Result	Ref.
Ariel Awards	7 September 2024	Best Picture	Hurricane Season	Nominated	
Ariel Awards	7 September 2024	Best Director	Elisa Miller	Nominated	
Ariel Awards	7 September 2024	Best Adapted Screenplay	Elisa Miller and Daniela Gómez	Won	
Ariel Awards	7 September 2024	Best Cinematography	María Secco	Nominated	
Ariel Awards	7 September 2024	Best Editing	Paulina Del Paso and Miguel Schverdfinger	Won	
Ariel Awards	7 September 2024	Best Sound	Sergio Díaz, Pablo Tamez Sierra, and Carlos Cortés Navarrete	Nominated	
Ariel Awards	7 September 2024	Best Original Score	Héctor Ruiz	Nominated	
Ariel Awards	7 September 2024	Best Art Direction	Carlos Y. Jacques	Nominated	
Ariel Awards	7 September 2024	Best Costume Design	Úrsula Schneider	Nominated	
Ariel Awards	7 September 2024	Best Makeup	Alejandra Velarde	Won	
Ariel Awards	7 September 2024	Best Special Effects	Víctor Valencia	Nominated	
Morelia International Film Festival	27 October 2023	Best Mexican Feature Film	Hurricane Season	Nominated	
Morelia International Film Festival	27 October 2023	Best Screenplay	Elisa Miller and Daniela Gómez	Won	
