= Harold Torres =

Mexican actor (born 1991)

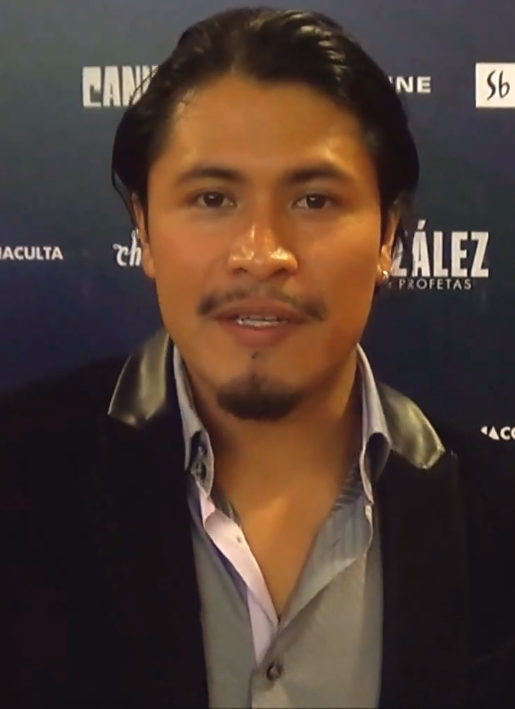
- Torres in 2015
- Born: 15 March 1991 (age 35); Toluca, State of Mexico, México
- Occupation: Actor
- Years active: 2006-present

Harold Torres (born 15 March 1991) is a Mexican actor. He has been nominated for the Ariel Award for Best Actor three times. For his work in ZeroZeroZero, Torres was nominated for an Independent Spirit Award for Best Male Performance in a New Scripted Series.

== Filmography ==
=== Film ===
Year	Title	Role	Notes
2006	Tráiler (Humanidad, alimento de los dioses)	Pepe	Short film
2006	Cobrador: In God We Trust	Amigo de "La Rebeca"	
2007	La venada		Short film
2007	La cadenita		
2008	Espiral	Santiago 1	
2008	Rudo y Cursi	Trompo Tovar	
2008	Los hijos de Caín	Sobrino	Short film
2009	Sin nombre	El Picaro	
2009	Raging Sun, Raging Sky	Bruno	
2009	Northless	Andres Garcia	
2009	Es como morirse	El migrante	Short film
2010	Atmosphere	Alberto	Short film
2010	A través del silencio	Jacinto	
2010	Sucedió en un día	Alberto	
2010	Daybreak	Unknown	Short film
2010	Marcelino Pan y Vino	Unknown	
2010	Der Kreis in dem sie reist	Unknown	Short film
2011	The Cinema Hold Up	Chanoc	
2011	La cebra	Odon	
2011	Días de gracia	Pulga	
2011	Dialogos Constructivos	Apolinar	Short film
2011	The Reasons of the Heart	Chalan	
2011	My Universe in Lower Case	Miguel	
2011	Ladies Mafia	Articulado Juan	
2012	The Girl	Isidro	
2012	For Greater Glory	Soldier 1	
2012	Colosio: El asesinato	Mario Aburto/Joel López 'La Ballena'/Juan Manuel Sánchez Ortiz	
2012	The ABCs of Death	Erik	
2013	Killing Strangers	Unknown	
2013	Potosí	Jonas	
2013	Estatuas	Taquero	Short film
2014	Después del Día	Ulises	Short film
2014	Open Cage	Sebastian	
2014	Dulce dolor	Recolector de basura	Short film
2014	González: falsos profetas	Gonzalez	Also producer and casting director
2014	Barbarous Mexico	Jose	
2014	Sexennial Plan	Juan	
2015	La Ribera	Fermin	Short film
2015	A Monster with a Thousand Heads	Police Agent 1	
2016	Tamara and the Ladybug	Paco	
2016	Forward	Tomas	
2016	Necropolis, Ashes to Ashes	Ghost	Short film
2017	Everybody Loves Somebody	Beto Alvarez	
2017	Periolimbo	Alberto Rodriguez	Short film
2017	Viento Abajo	Unknown	
2017	The Load	Coyolli	
2017	Polar Bear	Seminarista Raul	
2018	Betrayal	Comensal Barbacoa 1	
2018	La persistente	Ivan	Short film
2018	Tiempo de lluvia	Chucho	
2018	El día de la unión	Pulga	
2018	Sonora, the Devil's Highway	Marcos	
2020	Tramposos con suerte	Unknown	
2022	Memory	Hugo Marquez	
2022	Disappear Completely	Santiago	
2023	Silent Night	Playa	
TBA	La semilla del Istmo	Chico	

=== Television ===
Year	Title	Role	Notes
2011	Niño Santo	Mateo	TV series
2011	El encanto del águila	Jesus Nieto	1 episode
2012	La Ruta Blanca	Ambrosio Paz	1 episode
2014	Crónica de Castas	Raul	6 episodes
2014	El Chivo	Unknown	4 episodes
2015	Texas Rising	Portilla	Miniseries
2016	Hasta que te conocí	Jacobo Muniz	1 episode
2016	Lecciones de Vida	Silverio	TV Movie
2017	Ingobernable	Christopher "Chris" Lopez	7 episodes
2017	Drunk History: El Lado Borroso De La Historia	Jamaicon	1 episode
2017	El Chapo	El Cano	10 episodes
2019	Sitiados: México	Ermitano	TV series
2020	ZeroZeroZero	Manuel Contreras	Miniseries; 6 episodes
2017-2020	Run Coyote Run	Gamaliel	39 episodes
2023	La hora marcada	Lucas	Miniseries
2025-present	The Gringo Hunters	Nico	TV series
