= Ingobernable =

- Genre: Political drama
- Starring: Kate del Castillo; Erendira Ibarra; Alberto Guerra (actor); Erik Hayser; Luis Roberto Guzmán; Álvaro Guerrero; Luis Ernesto Franco
- Opening theme: "Me verás" performed by La Santa Cecilia
- Country of origin: Mexico
- Original language: Spanish
- No. of seasons: 2
- No. of episodes: 27

Production
- Executive producer: Kate del Castillo
- Production locations: Mexico City, Mexico; San Diego, California, United States
- Production company: Argos Comunicación

Original release
- Network: Netflix
- Release: March 24, 2017 – September 14, 2018

Ingobernable is a Mexican political drama television series starring Kate del Castillo that premiered on Netflix on 24 March 2017. Del Castillo plays the fictional First Lady of Mexico, Emilia Urquiza, and Erik Hayser plays the fictional President of Mexico, Diego Nava. The presidential couple push for internal peace in their country, but this is made difficult as unforeseen challenges emerge, and a major scandal begins to develop. Alicia Jaziz, Alberto Guerra, Alessio Valentini Padilla, Erendira Ibarra, and Álvaro Guerrero round out the cast playing the couple's daughter and son, the president's chief of staff, and the Secretary of the Interior, respectively. Netflix renewed the series for a second season, which became available on its streaming service on 14 September 2018.

== Plot ==
The plot revolves around the murder of Mexico's president, Diego Nava Martinez (Erik Hayser). On the night of his death, he attacks his wife, Emilia Urquiza (Kate del Castillo), in an abusive rage. The two struggle, and Emilia is eventually knocked unconscious. She wakes up to find that Diego is dead, his bloody body cast off the balcony of their hotel room. A gun she aimed at him in the midst of their encounter is in her hand, even though she had left it in the bedroom. This leads her to believe that someone else came into the room to kill Diego, then set her up to take the fall. So, she flees from the police.

== Cast ==
=== Main ===
- Kate del Castillo as Emilia Urquiza: First Lady of Mexico
- Erendira Ibarra as Ana Vargas-West: Chief of Staff of the President's Office
- Alberto Guerra as Canek Lagos
- Erik Hayser as Diego Nava Martínez: President of Mexico
- Luis Roberto Guzmán as Pete Vázquez: CIA agent
- Álvaro Guerrero as José Barquet: Secretary of the Interior
- Luis Ernesto Franco as Santiago Salazar

=== Recurring ===
- Fernando Luján as Tomás Urquiza
- Aida López as Chela Lagos
- Alicia Jaziz as María Nava Urquiza
- Alessio Valentini Padilla as Emiliano Nava Urquiza
- Marco Treviño as Agustín Aguirre, Secretary of National Defense
- María del Carmen Farías as Dolores Lagos
- Tamara Mazarrasa as Zyan Torres
- Harold Torres as Chris López
- Mariana Burelli as Daniela Hurtado
- Jeimy Osorio as Amanda
- Hernán Del Riego as Bruno Almada
- Mitzi Mabel Cadena as Citlali López "La Mosca"
- Lourdes Ruiz "La Reina del Albur" as Meche
- Diego Cadavid as Jaime Bray González
- Manuel Balbi as Jorge Antonio
- Luis Romano as Reportero
- Carlos Andrés Ramírez as Beto
- Lourdes Reyes as Sofía
- Juan Pablo Medina as General Rául Mejía
- Maxi Iglesias as Ovni
- Marina de Tavira as Patricia Lieberman
- Claudette Maillé as Ofelia Pereda
- Otto Sirgo as Tomás Urquiza

== Episodes ==
Series	Episodes	Originally released
1	15	24 March 2017
2	12	14 September 2018

=== Season 1 (2017) ===
No. overall	No. in season	Title	Directed by	Written by	Original release date
1	1	"Momento De Decisión (The Decision)"	Pedro Ybarra	Natasha Ybarra-Klor	24 March 2017
Emilia Urquiza, the First Lady of Mexico, has filed for divorce from her husband, Diego Nava, the President of Mexico. Nava confronts Emilia in her suite at a hotel in Mexico City. The pair argues, and Nava attacks Emilia. Emilia flees to the balcony in an effort to get away from Nava, but she knocks herself out while doing so. When she awakes, Nava has fallen over the balcony and landed on his vehicle. She also finds she is holding her pistol, which she did not have with her on the balcony. Down below, Nava is pronounced dead. Believing Emilia to have murdered Nava, Mexican secret service officers enter the suite, but Emilia escapes, fleeing the scene. A manhunt is then launched while José Barquet, Secretary of the Interior, is sworn in as President.

No. overall	No. in season	Title	Original release date
2	2	"La Huida (The Getaway)"	24 March 2017
Emilia must take extreme measures to remain hidden as Mexican government forces intensify their search for her.
3	3	"Las Deudas Se Pagan (Debts Are Meant To Be Repaid)"	24 March 2017
The autopsy results are made public. Emilia remembers happier memories with Diego as she plans her escape from Tepito.
4	4	"El Pacto (The Promise)"	24 March 2017
Glimpses of Emilia and Diego reveal painful truth. Emilia learns about the government's involvement in La Mosca's kidnapping.
5	5	"La Otra Verdad (The Alternative Truth)"	24 March 2017
Emilia makes a promise to the Tepito crew. The special prosecutor starts investigating the president's death.
6	6	"Causa De Muerte (Cause Of Death)"	24 March 2017
Emilia finally watches Diego's video and thinks she knows why he was killed. The children mourn their father.
7	7	"Bautismo De Fuego (Baptism By Fire"	24 March 2017
President Barquet wants Tomás to stop having press conferences. Emilia looks for important documents hidden by Jaime.
8	8	"Descenso Al Infierno (Spiral Into Hell)"	24 March 2017
Canek is determined to find his kidnapped friends. Tomás comes to an argument with Ana and Barquet.
9	9	"El Juramento (The Oath)"	24 March 2017
Emilia and the Tepito crew go on a mission to save Canek and La Mosca, and lives are lost in the process.
10	10	"Memoria Viva (Vivid Memory)"	24 March 2017
Maria is interviewed as part of the investigation. General Aguirre briefs the president on the secret black sites.
11	11	"El Grito (Declaration Of Independence)"	24 March 2017
Emilia and Zyan try to get General Aguirre to confess on camera. Mexico celebrates its Independence day.
12	12	"Las Reglas Del Juego (The Rules Of The Game)"	24 March 2017
Emilia makes contact with María. General Aguirre's confession is publicized, and violent consequences ensue.
13	13	"El Rostro Del Asesino (The Face Of The Killer)"	24 March 2017
Diego's real killer is revealed. Emilia worries about María's safety. Lieberman is suspicious of Ana.
14	14	"La Muerte Pide Permiso (Death Asks For Permission)"	24 March 2017
Emilia makes a plan to turn herself in and gets the most unlikely allies involved. Canek feels betrayed by Zyan.
15	15	"El Interés De La Justicia (For The Sake Of Justice)"	24 March 2017
The military takes drastic measures. Emilia receives assistance from someone she'd least expect and suffers a deep betrayal.

=== Season 2 (2018) ===
No. overall	No. in season	Title	Original release date
16	1	"La Justicia Como Espectáculo (Justice On Parade)"	14 September 2018
Emilia is tortured as her enemies band together to prompt a confession. Ana attempts to befriend multiple leaders within the government.
17	2	"Romper Cadenas (Breaking Chains)"	14 September 2018
Maria wakes up in a strange house and is bewildered by what she finds. Emilia's son pays her a visit. Canek connects with Ana
18	3	"El Peso De La Herencia (The Weight Of The Crown)"	14 September 2018
General Almada tries to find out who the mole is that ruined his plan. Emilia's father seeks absolution. Maria tries to communicate with the outside world
19	4	"Desde Las Cenizas (From The Ashes)"	14 September 2018
Ana asks questions about who she inadvertently has been working for. Unrest continues in Tepito, with Emilia at the center. Santi recruits an Army
20	5	"Encuentro Con El Pasado (The Light Of The Past)"	14 September 2018
Emilia looks into her Fathers finances and meets someone from his past. Simon asks Ana to prove her loyalty to the mission.
21	6	"Guerreras (Warriors)"	14 September 2018
Ana manipulates both of the presidential candidates. Emilia and her friends target a bank in the search of more answers about her father
22	7	"Paisaje Despues De La Batalla (Aftermath)"	14 September 2018
This episode is a dream and there is no point in trying to reconcile it with the previous episodes.
23	8	"Entre Dos Mundos (Between Two Worlds)"	14 September 2018
Ovni assumes an undercover persona and infiltrates Los Pinos to get closer to Raul. Emiliano receives a death threat.
24	9	"Decisiones (Decisions)."	14 September 2018
Emilia takes drastic measures when she and Canek head to the hospital to see their wounded family members. Ana is surprised by Ofelia
25	10	"Resistencia (Resistance)"	14 September 2018
Emilia's demands change as the hostage situation continues. Canek is tormented by his grief, and his visions of La Mosca threatens to overwhelm him.
26	11	"Metamorfosis (Metamorphosis)"	14 September 2018
Zyan is startled by who Santi has taken as his prisoners. Emilia finally comes face to face with Kelly Crawford, who has a proposal for her.
27	12	"Toma De Posesion (Hope)"	14 September 2018
As Emilia squares off against Kelly, she is surprised by Maria's reaction to the drug trafficking queen. Ana readies herself for battle.
