= And Suddenly the Dawn =

2017 film

- Film poster
- Directed by: Silvio Caiozzi
- Written by: Silvio Caiozzi
- Produced by: Guadalupe Bornand; Silvio Caiozzi; Edgardo Viereck
- Starring: Julio Jung
- Music by: Luis Advis; Valentina Caiozzi
- Release dates: 30 August 2017 (Montréal); 12 April 2018 (Chile)
- Running time: 195 minutes
- Country: Chile
- Language: Spanish

And Suddenly the Dawn (Spanish: Y de pronto el amanecer) is a 2017 Chilean drama film directed by Silvio Caiozzi. The film received positive critical reviews and was shown internationally at film festivals. And Suddenly the Dawn was the Chilean selection for Best Foreign Language Film at the 91st Academy Awards, but it did not receive a nomination.

== Plot ==
The movie tells the story of Pancho Veloso (Jung), a writer who flees his hometown in Chiloé and settles in Santiago de Chile, devoting his life to tabloid journalism. After 45 years, he returns to his hometown to create stories set in the area, inspired by the plot of the movie.

== Cast ==
- Julio Jung as Pancho Veloso
- Sergio Hernández as Miguel
- Magdalena Müller as Rosita
- Arnaldo Berríos as Luciano
- Pablo Schwarz as young Luciano
- Diego Pizarro as young Miguel
- Ana Reeves as Doña Maruja
- Neddiel Muñoz Millalonco as Viuda del Griego
- Darko Alexandar as El Griego
- Pedro Vicuña as El Duende
- Nelson Brodt as Pancho's father
- Aldo Parodi as Don Teodoro
- Agustín Moya as Mayor

== Reception ==
In 2017, And Suddenly the Dawn won the Grand Prix des Amériques, the main prize at the Montreal World Film Festival, and Best Film at the São Paulo International Film Festival. The film was awarded Best Picture and Best Original Score at the 2018 Trieste Latin American Film Festival. Valentina Caiozzi's work on the film's music was also honored at the 2019 Premios Pulsar. The film won best feature film at the 2019 Indie Pasión Ibero-American Film Festival in Miami.

The film was selected as the Chilean entry for the Best Foreign Language Film at the 91st Academy Awards, but it was not nominated.

Jonathan Holland, writing for The Hollywood Reporter, praised the film's "old-fashioned, ambitious storytelling," and noted that "[t]he pic may struggle to match its noble intentions, but its sincere and impassioned attempt to embody the struggles of a nation make it a worthy foreign-language Oscar entry for Chile."

== See also ==
- List of submissions to the 91st Academy Awards for Best Foreign Language Film
- List of Chilean submissions for the Academy Award for Best Foreign Language Film
