= Moisés Arizmendi =

Mexican actor

- Born: April 22, 1976 (age 50); Mexico
- Education: Foro de la Ribera, Mexico City
- Occupation: Actor
- Years active: 2006–present
- Known for: The Color of Passion (Amador Zuñiga)
- Notable work: Efectos secundarios, Locas de amor, Capadocia, Soy tu fan, La Reina del Sur

Moisés Arizmendi (born April 22, 1976) is a Mexican actor. He is most recognised for his portrayal of Amador Zuñiga, the recurring character on the Televisa telenovela The Color of Passion.

== Early life ==
Arizmendi began his theatrical training at the Foro de la Ribera in Mexico City, school where figures like Plutarco Haza, Ilse Salas, and Miguel Rodarte were also formed. Later he continued his studies with Héctor Mendoza and was part of the national theater company. His film debut was in 2006 with the film Efectos secundarios and then ventured into series such as Locas de amor, Capadocia, Soy tu fan, and La Reina del sur.

== Filmography ==
Film roles
| Year | Title | Roles | Notes |
|---|---|---|---|
| 2003 | El espejo | Martín | Short film |
| 2004 | Control de plagas | El Fumigador | Short film |
| 2006 | Caso terminal | Dr. Fernández | Short film |
| 2006 | Ciudad de muertos | Héctor | Short film |
| 2006 | Efectos secundarios | Santiago | |
| 2007 | La jaula del monarca | Satyr | Short film |
| 2008 | Casi divas | Production Assistant 2 | |
| 2008 | Under the Salt | Cabo Montoya | |
| 2010 | Igualdad | Ramiro | Short film |
| 2011 | Diálogos Constructivos | Noriega | Short film |
| 2011 | Viento en contra | Mario | |
| 2011 | Mi universo en minúsculas | Empleado Banco | |
| 2011 | Nos vemos, papá | Marco | |
| 2011 | El sueño de Lu | Emilio Jr | |
| 2012 | Colosio: El asesinato | Manuel Camacho Solís | |
| 2013 | The Last Call | Óscar | |
| 2013 | El palacio de las flores | Matías | Short film |
| 2014 | Cantinflas | Manuel M. Delgado | |
| 2014 | Gloria | Fernando Esquina | |
| 2014 | Los reyes del juego | Fabio | |
| 2015 | 24° 51' Latitud Norte | Fidel | Short film |
| 2016 | Los Presentes | Eduardo | |
| 2017 | Cuernavaca | Andrés | |
| 2018 | The Mongolian Conspiracy | Iván M. Laski | |
| 2019 | ’’Más allá de la herencia’’ | | |
| 2023 | Diary of an Unexpected Journey | Filiberto | |
| 2024 | Fine Young Men | Roberto | |

Television roles
| Year | Title | Roles | Notes |
|---|---|---|---|
| 2009 | Los simuladores | Unknown role | Episode: "Workaholic" |
| 2010 | Locas de amor | Roque Martínez | 25 episodes |
| 2010 | Gritos de muerte y libertad | Ignacio Aldama | Episode: "Entre el miedo y la victoria" |
| 2010 | Capadocia | Iván Ramírez | Episode: "La tercera parte del mar se convirtió en sangre" |
| 2011 | Bienvenida Realidad | Esteban Marín | |
| 2011 | La Reina del Sur | Coronel Ledesma | 2 episodes |
| 2011 | Soy tu fan | Jorge | 4 episodes |
| 2012 | La rosa de Guadalupe | Esteban | Episode: "Tuyo es mi corazón" |
| 2012 | Pacientes | Rogelio | 5 episodes |
| 2012–2017 | Como dice el dicho | Salvador / Julián | 2 episodes |
| 2013 | Nueva vida | Unknown role | Episode: "Bebé" |
| 2013 | El Señor de los Cielos | El Pollo | 18 episodes |
| 2014 | The Color of Passion | Amador Zuñiga | Main cast |
| 2015 | Que te perdone Dios | Porfirio | Recurring role |
| 2015–2016 | A que no me dejas | Jaime | Supporting role |
| 2016 | El hotel de los secretos | Olegario | Recurring role |
| 2016–2017 | Vino el amor | César | Supporting role |
| 2017 | La doble vida de Estela Carrillo | Unknown role | Guest star |
| 2017 | Caer en tentación | Christian | Guest star |
| 2017–2018 | El Chapo | President Esteban Prieto | |
| 2018 | Por amar sin ley | Alan Páez | Main cast |
| 2019-2020 | Lorenza | Luis Enrique | Main role |
| 2020 | Vencer el miedo | Fabián Cifuentes | Guest star |
| 2021 | Te acuerdas de mí | Ledezma | Guest star |
| 2022–2023 | Pálpito | Mariachi | |
| 2022 | Corona de lágrimas | Bátiz | Main cast (season 2) |
| 2024 | La historia de Juana | Salvador Castillo | |
| 2026 | Hermanas, un amor compartido | Pablo | |
| 2026 | Una familia complicada | Lorenzo | Main cast |
