= Silent Night (2023 film) =

American film by John Woo

- Theatrical release poster
- Directed by: John Woo
- Written by: Robert Archer Lynn
- Produced by: Christian Mercuri; Lori Tilkin deFelice; Basil Iwanyk; Erica Lee; John Woo
- Starring: Joel Kinnaman; Scott Mescudi; Harold Torres; Catalina Sandino Moreno
- Cinematography: Sharone Meir
- Edited by: Zach Staenberg
- Music by: Marco Beltrami
- Production companies: Capstone Global; Thunder Road Films; Capstone Studios; A Better Tomorrow Films
- Distributed by: Lionsgate Films
- Release date: December 1, 2023
- Running time: 104 minutes
- Country: United States
- Language: English
- Box office: $11.1 million

Silent Night is a 2023 American vigilante action-thriller film directed and produced by John Woo. The film, which features minimal spoken dialogue, follows an aggrieved father, played by Joel Kinnaman, avenging the death of his son, who was killed by local gang members in a drive-by shooting on Christmas Eve. Scott Mescudi, Harold Torres, and Catalina Sandino Moreno star in supporting roles.

Silent Night was Woo's first American feature directorial effort since 2003's Paycheck. Filming took place in Mexico City from April to May 2022. The film was released by Lionsgate Films in the United States on December 1, 2023, to mixed reviews from critics and only grossed $11 million worldwide.

== Plot ==
Brian Godlock is an electrician living with his wife Saya and young son Taylor Michael in the fictional town of Las Palomas, Texas. One Christmas Eve, Brian and Taylor are caught in the crossfire of gang war where Taylor is killed in a drive-by shooting. Brian immediately tries to apprehend the gangsters but Playa, the leader of one of the gangs, shoot him in the throat and leave him for dead. Brian survives, but damage to his vocal cords have left him unable to speak. While grieving, Brian becomes cold and distant, focused only on pursuing revenge; he formulates a plan for kill all the gang members involved in Taylor's death on the next Christmas Eve, spending the intervening year bodybuilding and undergoing self-defense and weapons training in preparation. Saya tries to be emotionally supportive to Brian during his physical recovery, but eventually becomes overwhelmed and leaves him.

Ahead of Christmas Eve, Brian visits detective Dennis Vassel, who offered to help in his son's case, using the opportunity to gather information on Playa's gang and begins reconnaissance on them. Brian abducts a member of Playa's gang, threatening him to provide written information on the gang's activity. The thug tries to escape only for Brian to subdue him in a fight. Brian delivers the thug to Vassel's house, along with a Christmas card stating his intent to kill Playa and his gang, the written information provided by the thug, and a thumb drive with the evidence he has collected. He also sends two of the thug's amputated fingers to Playa, intimidating him.

Brian spends the night of Christmas Eve killing the members of Playa's gang one by one, often interrupting their crimes in the process. He uses the cell phone of the last gang member to send a video of him shooting the thug to Playa, who sends a group text for his soldiers to come to his apartment building. Brian fights his way to the Playa's penthouse, where he is confronted by Vassel, who silently agrees to work with Brian to finish off Playa. Playa's girlfriend shoots them both, wounding Vassel, but Brian manages to hold her at gunpoint; he hesitates to kill her until she attacks him with a hidden sidearm. Brian shoots her and confronts Playa, who gets the upper hand and is about to shoot Brian before Vassel shoots him, allowing Brian to finish him off.

Having achieved his revenge, Brian hallucinates an alternate future where he and Taylor are both still alive. Saya receives a letter from Brian, apologizing for how he treated her, but thanks her for loving him, and that nothing can make their son's death right but he was willing to die trying. Saya visits Taylor's grave, where the Christmas present Taylor never opened - a toy train set - has been set up around his gravestone.

== Cast ==
- Joel Kinnaman as Brian Godlock
- Kid Cudi as Detective Dennis Vassel
- Harold Torres as Playa
- Catalina Sandino Moreno as Saya
- Yoko Hamamura as Ruiz
- Valeria Santaella as Venus
- Vinny O'Brien as Anthony Barelo
- Acoyani Chacon as Webface

== Production ==
"The whole movie is without dialogue. It allowed me to use visuals to tell the story, to tell how the character feels. We are using music instead of language. And the movie is all about sight and sound. The budget was a little tight, and the schedule was tight, but it made me change my working style. Usually, for a big movie, a studio movie, we shoot a lot of coverage, then leave it to the cutting room. But in this movie, I tried to combine things without doing any coverage shots. I had to force myself to use a new kind of technique. Some scenes were about two or three pages, but I did it all in one shot".

— John Woo (director)

In October 2021, Silent Night was first announced as an action film without spoken dialogue, with John Woo as director and Joel Kinnaman as lead star. In March 2022, a special effects assistant was injured during pre-production in a stunt trial run in Mexico City. The crew member was hit by a car, breaking his femur and dislocating his shoulder. In April 2022, Kid Cudi, Harold Torres, and Catalina Sandino Moreno were added to the cast. Principal photography began in April 2022 in Mexico City. Filming wrapped on May 17, 2022. Marco Beltrami composed the film's score.

In March 2023, producer Erica Lee confirmed the film features no dialogue, explaining "It really has no dialogue. It was another spec script that I was given and read, and I was like, 'This is either going to be a genius move or a disaster, there's no in between.' It's execution dependent for sure. I mean, John Woo kills it. Joel Kinnaman is the star and really delivers. I mean, there's some ambient noise and background and chatter like radio and stuff like that. But, yeah, it's awesome. I can't wait for you to see it."

Woo decided to film the action in a more realistic manner that supports the emotional drama instead of having the action itself being the entertaining aspect, which was signature of his previous films. For the film, Kinnaman decided to try method acting for the first time and stop speaking for the entirety of the shoot. The lack of communication left the actor feeling lonely, and after multiple start attempts, he decided that the silent car ride to his first day on set was long enough to get him excited for the film.

== Release ==
In September 2023, it was announced that Lionsgate Films had acquired the distribution rights for the film. The film was theatrically released on December 1, 2023.

=== Home media ===
Silent Night was released for digital platforms on December 19, 2023, followed by a Blu-ray, DVD and 4K UHD release on January 30, 2024.

== Reception ==
=== Box office ===
In the United States and Canada, the film was released alongside Renaissance: A Film by Beyoncé, Godzilla Minus One, and The Shift, and was originally projected to gross $6–8 million from 1,870 theatres in its opening weekend. After making $1 million on its first day (including $250,000 from Thursday night previews), estimates were lowered to $2–3 million. It went on to debut to $3 million, finishing ninth.

=== Critical response ===
On the review aggregator website Rotten Tomatoes, 59% of 120 critics' reviews are positive, with an average rating of 5.7/10. The website's consensus reads: "Silent Night reaffirms that an action movie doesn't need much dialogue if the set pieces are solid enough—and that even second-tier John Woo can be worth the price of admission." Metacritic, which uses a weighted average, assigned the film a score of 53 out of 100, based on 29 critics, indicating "mixed or average" reviews. Audiences surveyed by CinemaScore gave the film an average grade of "C" on an A+ to F scale, while those polled by PostTrak gave it a 67% overall positive score, with 38% saying they would definitely recommend the film.

David Ehrlich of IndieWire panned the film, saying that "the kindest thing I can say about [John Woo's] latest film[...] is that its worst moments don't resemble the cinema of John Woo at all". Peter Debruge of Variety wrote, "Silly as it might be, Silent Night gives audiences reason to get excited about the Hong Kong innovator once again, ranking as one of the few bloody Christmas counterprogrammers since Die Hard that feels worthy of repeat viewing down the road".

Critics were divided over the absence of dialogue in the film; Kyle Smith of The Wall Street Journal felt that it made the film "surprisingly dull".; while Frank Scheck of The Hollywood Reporter said, "It's to Woo's and screenwriter Robert Lynn's credit, as well the fiercely commanding, intensely physical performance by Kinnaman, that the film's lack of dialogue proves not a gimmick but an asset."

Glenn Kenny of The New York Times praised the film for its well-crafted and brutal action scenes, writing that "there's a lot of sound and fury and it works: This is suspenseful and cathartic, and even the schmaltzy stuff is so distinctly John Woo that it's welcome." Matt Zoller Seitz of RogerEbert.com thought it to be one of Woo's best films, emphasizing his bold yet elegant editing style: "[t]he cliches of the action/revenge movie ultimately stop seeming merely familiar and begin to feel ritualistic", and that "Movies like this don't work unless the people who made them aren't afraid to risk going too far[....] Sometimes, if they keep pushing and pushing, they overcome any supposed rational objections the viewer might have, and there's a breakthrough. The floodgates open, and the feeling that pours forth is magnificent, rare, and sublime".

In 2024, film critic Scout Tafoya, a colleague of Seitz on RogerEbert.com, included Silent Night in his video series "The Unloved", where he expressed disappointment in how "very few people seemed willing to engage with the visual language of the movie." He reasoned that "Woo relied purely on his chops as an imagemaker to tell the story of Silent Night, an admittedly simplistic, perhaps too contemporary story of revenge modelled on the more popular, retrograde version of action cinema from the last twenty years."
