= Un día para vivir =

Mexican anthology television series

- Genre: Thriller
- Created by: Héctor Forero; David Mascareño
- Written by: Patricia Zamorano; Natalia Núñez
- Directed by: Daniel Aguirre; Mauricio Meneses
- Presented by: María José Magán
- Composers: Heriberto Sánchez; Carlos López Cornu; Salvador Valenzuela; Gustavo Gónzalez; Sergio Ojeda
- Country of origin: Mexico
- Original language: Spanish
- No. of seasons: 2
- No. of episodes: 98

Production
- Executive producer: Rafael Urióstegui
- Producer: Luis Merlo
- Cinematography: Alfonso Pérez Dávila
- Editors: Alejandra Espinoza; Mónica Rodríguez Carrillo
- Camera setup: Multi-camera
- Production company: TV Azteca

Original release
- Network: Azteca 7
- Release: 6 September 2021 – present

Un día para vivir is a Mexican thriller anthology television series that premiered on Azteca 7 on 6 September 2021. The series is produced by Rafael Urióstegui and stars María José Magán.

== Premise ==
Un día para vivir tells the stories of men and women of different ages who are apparently going through a good time in their lives, but receive a visit from death who warns them that they have 24 hours to resolve what they have pending. In a race against time, each one will have to decide their responsibility and do the impossible if they want another chance.

== Cast ==
María José Magán plays the character of "La muerte" —The Death in English— throughout the series. In each episode, guest actors also include:

- Alejandra Lazcano
- Cecilia Ludmila Ponce
- Lorena del Castillo
- Jack Duarte
- Andrea Noli
- Daniel Navarro
- Mauricio Islas
- Issabela Camil
- Pedro Sicard
- Sylvia Pasquel

== Production ==
The series was announced in early January 2021 by TV Azteca, as part of Azteca 7's new programming for 2021; it was originally going to be called Contratiempo. The production of the series began filming on March 17, 2021, taking into account hygiene and safety measures in light of the COVID-19 pandemic in Mexico, and the title of the series will be changed to 24 horas para vivir. A mass was also held to celebrate the start of filming, which was attended by the production team, actress María José Magán, executives Rafael Urióstegui and Adrián Ortega, as well as writers Héctor Forero and David Mascareño.

The series marks the return of TV Azteca to fiction production, to which the V.P. of production and programming of Azteca 7, Adrián Ortega, expressed his happiness for the restart of these fiction formats.

In May 2021, the series was presented by TV Azteca Internacional at the LA Screenings 2021, now called Un día para vivir as the official title of the series, having confirmed a total of 60 episodes produced. On May 13 of the same year, PRODU's official website launched the official trailer for the series.

== Ratings ==
Viewership and ratings per season of Un día para vivir
Season	Timeslot (CT)	Episodes	First aired		Last aired		Avg. viewers (millions)
Season	Timeslot (CT)	Episodes	Date	Viewers (millions)	Date	Viewers (millions)	Avg. viewers (millions)
1	Mon–Thurs 8:30 p.m.	16	6 September 2021	0.97	16 December 2021	TBD	0.86
