= Diary of an Unexpected Journey =

- Theatrical release poster
- Directed by: Paco Alvarez
- Written by: Paco Alvarez; Antonella Samaniego
- Produced by: Paco Alvarez; José Luis Montaño Pillo
- Starring: Getsemaní Vela; Xabiani Ponce de León; Kevin Holt; Carlos Corona; Moisés Arizmendi; Martha Claudia Moreno; Barbie Casillas
- Release date: April 20, 2023
- Running time: 93 minutes
- Country: Mexico
- Language: Spanish

Diary of an Unexpected Journey (Spanish: Diario de un viaje inesperado) is a 2023 Mexican romantic comedy-drama road movie directed by Paco Alvarez (in his directorial debut) and written by Alvarez & Antonella Samaniego. It features Getsemaní Vela, Xabiani Ponce de León, Kevin Holt, Carlos Corona, Moisés Arizmendi, Martha Claudia Moreno and Barbie Casillas. It premiered on April 20, 2023, in Mexican theaters.

== Synopsis ==
Michelle, a superficial and wealthy young woman, receives as an inheritance from her father a diary where he tells her that she must make a trip to Chiapas to be able to access all her assets. Despite being against it, she is forced to travel in the company of a musician whom she mistakes for the lawyer who must attest to the trip.

== Cast ==
The actors participating in this film are:

- Getsemaní Vela as Michelle
- Xabiani Ponce de León as Alfonso
- Kevin Holt as Roberto
- Carlos Corona as Benito
- Moisés Arizmendi as Filiberto
- Martha Claudia Moreno as Eugenia
- Barbie Casillas as Lorenita
- Ricardo Ortega as Martín
- María Magdalena Palma Gómez as Doña Cruz
- Chucho Rivas as Taxi driver
