= Disappear Completely =

2022 Mexican film

- Promotional release poster
- Directed by: Luis Javier Henaine
- Written by: Ricardo Aguado-Fentanes; Luis Javier Henaine
- Produced by: Pablo Zimbrón Alva; Gerardo Gatica; Luis Javier Henaine
- Starring: Harold Torres; Teté Espinoza; Fermín Martínez; Vicky Araico; Norma Reyna; Quetzalli Cortés
- Production companies: Moonlight Pictures; Varios Lobos; Panorama Global
- Distributed by: Mantícora Distribución
- Release dates: 2022 (Fantastic Fest); 29 February 2024 (Mexico)
- Running time: 100 minutes
- Country: Mexico
- Language: Spanish

Disappear Completely (Spanish: Desaparecer por completo) is a 2022 Mexican supernatural horror film directed and co-produced by Luis Javier Henaine, who also co-wrote the film with Ricardo Aguado-Fentanes. It stars Harold Torres.

Disappear Completely premiered at Fantastic Fest in 2022. It received a theatrical release in Mexico on 29 February 2024 by Mantícora Distribución, and was released on Netflix on 12 April 2024.

== Plot ==
After visiting a crime scene, Santiago, an unscrupulous tabloid photojournalist, becomes cursed and begins to gradually lose each of his five senses.

== Cast ==
- Harold Torres as Santiago
- Teté Espinoza
- Fermín Martínez
- Vicky Araico
- Norma Reyna
- Quetzalli Cortés

== Reception ==
On the review aggregator website Rotten Tomatoes, 100% of 13 critics' reviews are positive, with an average rating of 7.4/10. Metacritic, which uses a weighted average, assigned the film a score of 71 out of 100, based on 4 critics, indicating "generally favorable" reviews.

Brian Tallerico of RogerEbert.com gave the film a score of three out of four stars; he compared it favorably to the works of John Carpenter or Wes Craven, praising its cinematography and Torres's performance. IndieWire's Alison Foreman gave the film a grade of "B–", likening it to the American films Drag Me to Hell (2009) and Nightcrawler (2014), and writing that, "its skin-crawling presentation (you will feel, smell, and even taste a few scenes) and uniquely perverse consideration of a terrifying concept make it worth seeing."
