= I Don't Expect Anyone to Believe Me =

- Promotional release poster
- Spanish: No voy a pedirle a nadie que me crea
- Directed by: Fernando Frías de la Parra
- Screenplay by: María Camila Arias; Fernando Frías de la Parra
- Based on: No voy a pedirle a nadie que me crea by Juan Pablo Villalobos
- Produced by: Fernando Frías de la Parra; Arturo Sampson; Isaac Lee; Antonio Asensio; Paloma Molina
- Starring: Darío Yazbek; Natalia Solián; Alexis Ayala; Anna Castillo; Carmen Beato; Juan Minujín
- Cinematography: Damián García
- Edited by: Yibran Asaud
- Music by: Joe Rodriguez; Javier Nuño
- Production companies: Zeta Studios; Exile Content
- Distributed by: Netflix
- Release dates: 22 October 2023 (FICM); 22 November 2023 (Netflix)
- Countries: Mexico; Spain
- Language: Spanish

I Don't Expect Anyone to Believe Me (Spanish: No voy a pedirle a nadie que me crea) is a 2023 black comedy thriller film directed by Fernando Frías de la Parra based on the novel by Juan Pablo Villalobos which stars Darío Yazbek.

== Plot ==
Just before leaving Mexico for Barcelona with his girlfriend Valentina, set on pursuing a PhD scholarship, Juan Pablo becomes entangled with a drug cartel which tasks him with a mission in Catalonia, finding inspiration for his new novel while his life takes a dark turn.

== Cast ==
- Darío Yazbek as Juan Pablo
- Natalia Solián as Valentina Cruz García
- Anna Castillo as Laia
- Alexis Ayala as "El licenciado"
- Carmen Beato
- Ivano Palatucci
- Juan Minujín as Facundo
- Bruna Cusí
- Mima Riera
- Clara Roquet

== Production ==
A Mexican-Spanish co-production, the film was produced by Zeta Studios and Exile Content. It was primarily shot in Barcelona.

== Release ==
The film premiered at the 21st Morelia International Film Festival on 22 October 2023. It also made it to the international competition of the 38th Mar del Plata International Film Festival. It will be made available on Netflix on 22 November 2023.

== See also ==
- List of Mexican films of 2023
