= The (Almost) Legends =

- Netflix release poster
- Directed by: Ricardo Castro Velazquez
- Written by: Ricardo Castro Velazquez; Beto Gómez; María Torres; Enrique Vázquez
- Produced by: Mónica Lozano; Eamon O'Farrill
- Starring: Benny Emmanuel; Harold Azuara
- Cinematography: Angello Faccini
- Edited by: Camilo Abadía
- Music by: Tomás Barreiro
- Production company: Alebrije Cine y Video
- Distributed by: Netflix
- Release dates: July 13, 2023 (Limited); July 19, 2023 (Netflix)
- Running time: 96 minutes
- Country: Mexico
- Language: Spanish

The (Almost) Legends (Spanish: Los (casi) ídolos de Bahía Colorada, lit. 'The (almost) idols of Bahía Colorada') is a 2023 Mexican comedy film directed by Ricardo Castro Velazquez (in his directorial debut) and written by Velazquez, Beto Gómez, María Torres and Enrique Vázquez. Starring Benny Emmanuel and Harold Azuara accompanied by Esmeralda Soto, Ana Celeste, Guillermo Quintanilla, Diego Sandoval, Dagoberto Gama, Paulina de Labra, Silverio Palacios and Nora Velázquez.

== Synopsis ==
Two half-brothers, Romeo and Preciado, meet again in Bahía Colorada, Sinaloa, after years of estrangement, both with the purpose of honoring the memory of Valentín, their father, who died with the dream of winning an automobile and music contest.

== Cast ==
The actors participating in this film are:

- Benny Emmanuel as Romeo Abitia
  - Emiliano Torres as Romeo at age 10
- Harold Azuara as Preciado Abitia
  - Raúl Gabriel Morales Ramírez as Preciado at age 10
- Nora Velázquez as Connie
- Guillermo Quintanilla as Valentín Abitia Gallardo
- Dagoberto Gama as Don Tasio Candelario
- Silverio Palacios as Uncle Cosme
- Ana Celeste as Marén
- Esmeralda Soto as Dively
- Diego Sandoval Montes as Tino
- César Castillo as Mocorito
- Juan Andrés Belgrave as Swedish
- Paulina de Labra as Raquel
- Edith Nuñez as Mocorito's daughter
- Amanda Polo as Esmeralda
- Julio Patricio as Delegangster
- Carmen García as Shopkeeper
- Gaby Navarro as Super Star Freski Bombis
- Víctor Quintero as "The Baby"
- Alexander Show as Grullero
- Karem Momo as Silvia
- Chùy Gallardo as Picky Boy
- Ana Chiquete as Picky Girl
- Mario Zamacona as The beast
- Francisco Pita as The Divine Master
- Eduardo Ángel Bravo as Enrique Riquelme

== Release ==
The (Almost) Legends had a limited theatrical release on July 13, 2023, then was released worldwide on July 19, 2023, on Netflix.
