= Valentina or the Serenity =

- Promotional release poster
- Directed by: Ángeles Cruz
- Written by: Ángeles Cruz
- Produced by: Isis Ahumada; Myriam Bravo; Ángeles Cruz
- Starring: Danae Ahuja Aparicio
- Cinematography: Carlos Correa
- Edited by: Felipe Gómez
- Music by: Maria Alejandra Hernandez; Rubén Luengas
- Production company: IMCINE
- Distributed by: Piano
- Release dates: September 8, 2023 (TIFF); September 26, 2024 (Mexico)
- Running time: 86 minutes
- Country: Mexico
- Languages: Spanish; Mixtec

Valentina or the Serenity (Spanish: Valentina o la serenidad) is a 2023 Mexican drama film written, co-produced and directed by Ángeles Cruz. Starring Danae Ahuja Aparicio who plays a little girl who will use her imagination to face the premature death of her father. It had its world premiere at the 48th Toronto International Film Festival on 8 September 2023 as part of the Discovery section.

== Synopsis ==
Valentina is a happy, adventurous, enthusiastic and curious little girl in her environment full of nature, characteristic of the town of Villa Guadalupe Victoria, Oaxaca where she lives. One day, she receives the news that her father died in a river accident in the middle of a stormy night. However, she clings to her imagination and the promise that her father told her to return with a gift, causing discomfort in the rest of her family who don't know how to make her understand that her father will never return.

== Cast ==
- Danae Ahuja Aparicio as Valentina
- Myriam Bravo as Valentina's mom
- Alexander Gadiel Mendoza Sanchéz as Pedro

== Production ==
=== Development ===
Ángeles Cruz was inspired by her own personal experiences related to death, especially the sudden death of her father when she was 9 years old, which changed the perspective of her world. In 2020, during confinement due to the COVID-19 pandemic, her younger brother died, which forced her to face the death of a loved one again and was the motivation for making the film. That same year the first draft of the script was completed.

=== Filming ===
Principal photography began on August 15, 2022, in Villa de Guadalupe Victoria, Oaxaca, where the director is originally from.

== Release ==
=== Festivals ===
It had its world premiere on September 8, 2023, in the Discovery section of the 48th Toronto International Film Festival, then screened on October 23, 2023, at the 21st Morelia International Film Festival, on November 14, 2023, at the 8th International Indigenous Film Festival in Wallmapu, on November 15, 2023, at the 49th Huelva Ibero-American Film Festival, on March, 17, 2024, at the Cinélatino Festival Rencontres de Toulouse, on April 9, 2024, at the 48th Cleveland International Film Festival, on May 17, 2024, at the 50th Seattle International Film Festival, and on May, 22, 2024, at the 77th Cannes Film Festival.

=== Theatrical ===
It was commercially released on September 26, 2024, in Mexican theaters.

== Accolades ==
Year	Award / Festival	Category	Recipient	Result	Ref.
2023	21st Morelia International Film Festival	Best Feature Film	Valentina or the Serenity	Nominated	
2023	49th Huelva Ibero-American Film Festival	Colón de Oro	Valentina or the Serenity	Won	
2023	49th Huelva Ibero-American Film Festival	Best Performance	Myriam Bravo	Won	
2023	49th Huelva Ibero-American Film Festival	Most Supportive Film Award	Valentina or the Serenity	Won	
2023	49th Huelva Ibero-American Film Festival	Broken Heart Award	Valentina or the Serenity	Won	
2024	Festival Ojoloco du Cinéma Ibérique et Latino-Américain de Grenoble	Prix Du Jury Étudiant	Valentina or the Serenity	Won	
2024	48th Cleveland International Film Festival	International Narrative Competition - Best Feature Film	Valentina or the Serenity	Nominated	
2024	50th Seattle International Film Festival	Ibero American Competition - Grand Jury Prize	Valentina or the Serenity	Nominated	
2024	66th Ariel Awards	Best Supporting Actress	Myriam Bravo	Nominated	
2024	66th Ariel Awards	Best Breakthrough Performance	Danae Ahuja Aparicio	Nominated	
2024	66th Ariel Awards	Best Original Screenplay	Ángeles Cruz	Nominated	
