= Sorcery (film) =

Brujería
- Theatrical release poster
- Directed by: Christopher Murray
- Written by: Christopher Murray; Pablo Paredes
- Produced by: Juan de Dios Larraín; Nicolás Celis; Pablo Larraín; Rocío Jadue
- Starring: Valentina Véliz
- Cinematography: María Secco
- Edited by: Paloma López
- Music by: Leonardo Heiblum
- Production companies: Bord Cadre Films; Fábula; Match Factory Productions; Pimienta Films; Sovereign Films
- Distributed by: Pimienta Films
- Release dates: March 16, 2023 (Mexico); March 23, 2023 (Chile)
- Running time: 100 minutes
- Countries: Chile; Mexico; Germany
- Languages: Spanish; Mapudungun; German

Sorcery (Spanish: Brujería) is a 2023 fantasy drama film directed by Christopher Murray and co-written by Murray and Pablo Paredes. The film stars Valentina Véliz and is inspired by a true story involving accusations of witchcraft against members of the Recta Provincia organization in 1880. It was nominated for the World Cinema Dramatic Competition at the 2023 Sundance Film Festival.

== Plot ==
In late 19th-century Chiloé, Rosa, an indigenous girl, and her father work for German settlers who raise sheep. After a lamb massacre, German patriarch Stefan accuses the indigenous locals. When Rosa's father intervenes, he is killed by Stefan's dogs. Rosa seeks justice from the town mayor, but the mayor, unwilling to upset the German settlers, refuses to act. Turning to the church, Rosa finds a guardian in the priest who arranges for her to stay with Mateo, an indigenous elder who lives alone.

Mateo takes Rosa in and she helps him with fishing. They visit her father's grave, and Mateo tells her that her father's spirit belongs to the sea. Overwhelmed by grief, Rosa tries to drown herself but Mateo saves her. Rosa then asks Mateo to seek justice for her father. Mateo agrees to consult the indigenous community. Shortly after, Stefan's sons disappear, and the mayor arrests Mateo and other locals. With Mateo imprisoned, Rosa is taken in by a local witch and, after witnessing Mateo's torture, she renounces Christianity and embraces the island's native religion under the witch's guidance.

During a ritual involving skin-wearing, Rosa and the witch are captured by Stefan. The mayor, eager to resolve the situation for a promotion, offers leniency if Mateo's people save his ailing wife and unborn child. Mateo initially resists but is persuaded by Rosa. Rosa successfully saves the mayor's family with her new witchcraft skills, but the mayor breaks his promise, declaring the ritual skin to be from Stefan's children and sentencing all prisoners to death.

Mateo dies in jail, and the remaining prisoners perform a ritual where Rosa wears Mateo's skin, transforming into a powerful dog. As the dog, Rosa sneaks into the mayor's home and threatens his family. Terrified, the mayor releases Rosa and her friends. Later, Rosa leads another ritual, having fully embraced her new path.

== Cast ==
The actors participating in this film are:

- Valentina Véliz as Rosa Raín
- Daniel Antivilo as Mateo Coñuecar
- Sebastian Hülk as Stefan
- Daniel Muñoz as Mayor Acevedo
- Neddiel Muñoz Millalonco as Aurora Quinchen / Witch

== Release ==
=== Festivals ===
The film had its international premiere on January 21, 2023, at the 2023 Sundance Film Festival as part of the World Cinema Dramatic Competition. Then, it premiered on February 1, 2023, at the Göteborg Film Festival in Sweden. It is also set to screen at the 56th Sitges Film Festival as a part of the Official Selection in October 2023. It also screened at the 36th Tokyo International Film Festival in October 2023.

=== Theatrical ===
Sorcery was released commercially on March 16, 2023, in Mexican theaters and a week later it was released in Chilean theaters.

== Reception ==
=== Critical reception ===
On the review aggregator website Rotten Tomatoes, 79% of 14 critics' reviews are positive, with an average rating of 7.0/10.

Jonathan Holland of Screendaily wrote: "Visually, Sorcery is always oppressively dark and delicious. But following the surreal court trial of Mateo and his team, the tension flags as the free-form, supernatural element is foregrounded and events pile up too quickly to feel credible." Jacob Oller of Paste magazine wrote: "Sorcery only explores a tiny event, a blip on its timeline, and squeezes it into a subgenre that removes some of its more fascinating textures. But there’s still so much power in its imagery that it’s more tantalizing than frustrating."

=== Accolades ===
Year	Award / Festival	Category	Recipient	Result	Ref.
2023	Sundance Film Festival	World Film Dramatic Competition	Sorcery	Nominated	
2023	Göteborg Film Festival	Dragon Award – International Competition	Sorcery	Nominated	
2023	Cinélatino Festival Toulouse	Cinema+ Award	Sorcery	Won	
2023	Bucheon International Fantastic Film Festival	Best Picture	Sorcery	Won	
2024	Caleuche Awards	Best Supporting Actor	Daniel Muñoz	Nominated	
