= Lost in the Night =

- Promotional release poster
- Spanish: Perdidos en la noche
- Directed by: Amat Escalante
- Screenplay by: Amat Escalante; Martín Escalante
- Produced by: Nicolás Celis; Fernanda de la Peza
- Starring: Juan Daniel García; Ester Expósito; Bárbara Mori; Fernando Bonilla
- Cinematography: Adrián Durazo
- Edited by: Fernanda de la Peza
- Music by: Kyle Dixon; Michael Stein
- Production companies: Bord Cadre Films; Cárcava Cine; Match Factory Productions; Pimienta Films; Snowglobe
- Release date: 18 May 2023 (Cannes)
- Countries: Mexico; Germany; Netherlands; Denmark
- Language: Spanish

Lost in the Night (Spanish: Perdidos en la noche) is a 2023 mystery thriller film directed by Amat Escalante from a screenplay he co-wrote with Martín Escalante which stars Juan Daniel García alongside Ester Expósito, Bárbara Mori, and Fernando Bonilla. It is a Mexican-German-Dutch-Danish international co-production.

== Plot ==
The plot follows a boy of humble origins (Emiliano) who enters to work for the well-off Aldama family to find out whether his missing mother's corpse is in the family's property.

== Cast ==
- Juan Daniel García Treviño as Emiliano
- Fernando Bonilla as Rigo
- Bárbara Mori as Carmen
- Ester Expósito as Mónica
- Vicky Araico as Paloma
- Mafer Osio as Jazmín

== Production ==
The film is a Mexican-German-Dutch-Danish co-production by Bord Cadre Films, Cárcava Cine, Match Factory Productions, Pimienta Films, and Snowglobe Films. Shooting locations included Guanajuato.

== Release ==
The film was presented in the 'Cannes Premiere' section of the 76th Cannes Film Festival on 18 May 2023. It also made it to the main slate of the 27th Lima Film Festival.

== Reception ==
According to the review aggregation website Rotten Tomatoes, Lost in the Night has a 61% approval rating based on 18 reviews from critics, with an average rating of 5.9/10. Metacritic, which uses a weighted average, assigned the film a score of 59 out of 100, based on 5 critics, indicating "mixed or average" reviews.

Lee Marshall of ScreenDaily deemed the film to be "at its heart, a fairly conventional crime movie", underscoring that "beneath its edgy surface [the film] is basically a boy detective yarn".

David Rooney of The Hollywood Reporter deemed the class-inequality mystery thriller film to be "absorbing, but rarely more than that".

== See also ==
- List of Mexican films of 2023
