= Neddiel Muñoz Millalonco =

Neddiel Muñoz Millalonco is a Huilliche educator, poet, researcher, and traditional singer from Chiloé Island, Chile.

Her performance of traditional indigenous music of southern South America as part of the musical group Armazón has been preserved in two recordings: Gulkantün, canto ceremonial williche, which focuses on traditional Huilliche songs and is sung in Mapudungun, and Tributo a los Selkʼnam, which focuses on music of the Selkʼnam people. The recordings were based on research Muñoz conducted among communities in the southern Patagonian archipelagos. Her recordings are considered a dialogue between the elders of the Huilliche people and the younger generation, with the traditional songs fused with rock styles and traditional instruments played alongside modern ones.

She also leads the band Anklaje, which performs indigenous music that, Muñoz says, "was forgotten for many years, but is reclaiming its place and the respect that it always should have been given." She has worked to further spread knowledge of this music through presenting at international festivals and collaborating on preservation projects with the General Council of Caciques of Chiloé. In 2020, her piece "Kitral" won her second place in the folk music category of the Concurso de Composición Musical Luis Advis, a composition contest in Chile.

Muñoz has also written poetry and worked as a children's educator and as an actress, appearing in the Silvio Caiozzi film And Suddenly the Dawn in 2017 and the film Sorcery in 2023. In her review of Sorcery for the British Film Institute, Leila Latif described her performance as "darkly enigmatic".

== Discography ==
- Gülkantun - Canto Ceremonial Williche (1999), with Armazón
- El deshielo del canto - Tributo a los Selkʼnam (2003), with Armazón
- Encaminados por los espíritus (2017), with Anklaje
- We Newen (2019), with Anklaje
- Küme Rupu (2022), with Anklaje

== Filmography ==
- La primera música (2012)
- ...Y de pronto el amanecer (2018)
- Sorcery (2023)
