= La cebra =

- Theatrical release poster
- Directed by: Fernando Javier León Rodríguez
- Written by: Fernando Javier León Rodríguez
- Produced by: Socorro Méndez Díaz; Antonio Urdapilleta
- Starring: Harold Torres; Jorge Adrián Espíndola
- Cinematography: Martín Boege
- Edited by: Óscar Figueroa
- Music by: Julio de la Rosa
- Production company: Cinemágico Producciones
- Distributed by: Corazón Films
- Release dates: March 25, 2011 (Guadalajara); January 18, 2013 (Mexico)
- Running time: 100 minutes
- Country: Mexico
- Language: Spanish
- Budget: $18.5 million pesos

La cebra (lit. 'The zebra') is a 2011 Mexican comedy-drama film written and directed by Fernando Javier León Rodríguez in his directorial debut. Starring Harold Torres and Jorge Adrián Espíndola. It is set at the time of the Mexican revolution and tells the story of Leandro and Odón, two friends who find a zebra that they mistake for an "American horse" and have the idea that by handing it over they will be appointed colonels or generals.

== Synopsis ==
Leandro and Odon are two young patriots who want to join the revolutionary forces of Álvaro Obregón. So they decide to travel to the north of Mexico where they find a donkey that they confuse with a "gringo horse", they also decide to call it "Fucker".

== Cast ==
The actors participating in this film are:

- Jorge Adrián Espíndola as Leandro Pérez
- Harold Torres as Odón Gómez
- Leticia Huijara as Juana
- Paulina Gaitán as Valentina
- Alejandra Ley as Adelfa
- Jesús Ochoa as Álvaro Obregón
- Raquel Pankowsky as Lady Martina
- Graciela Orozco as "The Lady"
- Alejandro Caso as Official Zedillo
- Hermán López as Officer Portillo
- Tomás Rojas as Officer Echevarria
- Humberto Elizondo as General Quesada
- Julián Villagrán as Colonel
- Manolo Solo as "The one-eyed"
- Raúl Adalid as Official Hurtado
- Emilio Savinni as Circusman Chuck
- Meraqui Rodríguez as Circus Mary
- Héctor Holten as Officer Salinas

== Production ==
Principal photography for the film began in November 2010 in Pachuca, Hidalgo. It was also filmed in Baja California, Guanajuato and Puebla, Mexico.

== Release ==
La cebra had its international premiere on March 25, 2011, at the Guadalajara International Film Festival. It was commercially released on January 18, 2013, in Mexican theaters.

== Accolades ==
Year	Award	Category	Recipient	Result	Ref.
2012	Lima Latin American Film Festival	Best First Work	La cebra	Won	
2012	Pantalla de Cristal	Best Investigation	Alisarine Ducolomb	Nominated	
2012	The Festival Pantalla de Cristal	Best Art Direction	Alisarine Ducolomb	Nominated	
2014	Ariel Award	Best Actor	Harold Torres	Nominated	
