= Dagoberto Gama =

Mexican actor

- Born: December 22, 1959 (age 66); Coyuca de Catalán, Guerrero, Mexico
- Occupation: Actor
- Years active: 1987–present

Dagoberto Gama (born December 22, 1959, in Coyuca de Catalán, Guerrero, Mexico) is a Mexican television and film actor. He is well known for his recurring role in the television series La Reina del Sur as El Pote and Sin senos sí hay paraíso as Gato Gordo.

== Filmography ==
=== Film ===
| Year | Title | Role | Notes |
|---|---|---|---|
| 1990 | La vengadora implacable | Transeunte | |
| 1996 | Julio y su ángel | Carlos | |
| 1997 | La Perra | Sargento Rivas | |
| 2000 | Amores perros | Álvaro | |
| 2001 | Piedras verdes | Cruz | |
| 2001 | De la calle | Judicial 2 | |
| 2001 | Powder Keg | Police 3 | Short film |
| 2002 | Cuentos de hadas para dormir cocodrilos | Domingo | |
| 2002 | El crimen del padre Amaro | Lucas | |
| 2003 | El misterio del Trinidad | Tiburón Enano | |
| 2003 | El mexicano | Qué Pasa | |
| 2005 | El violín | Capitán | |
| 2005 | El otro José | Judicial | Short film |
| 2005 | Yo estaba ocupada encontrando respuestas, mientras tú simplemente seguías con la vida real | Cocinero | Short film |
| 2006 | Un mundo maravilloso | Guardia Mansión 1 | |
| 2007 | Mejor es que Gabriela no se muera | Bracho | |
| 2008 | El viaje de Teo | Dagoberto | |
| 2008 | Conozca la cabeza de Juan Pérez | Capitán Juárez | |
| 2010 | Nomads | Romy | |
| 2010 | El infierno | Sargento | |
| 2015 | La sargento Matacho | Comandante Duarte | |
| 2023 | The (Almost) Legends | Don Tasio Candelario | |

=== Television ===
| Year | Title | Role | Notes |
|---|---|---|---|
| 2004 | La vida es una canción | Bruno | 2 episodes |
| 2006 | Línea nocturna | Juan | Episode: "El tesoro de Juan Chávez" |
| 2010 | Gritos de muerte y libertad | Vicente Guerrero | 2 episodes |
| 2011 | La Reina del Sur | Potequim Galvez "El Pote" | Recurring role (season 1); 34 episodes |
| 2011 | El encanto del águila | Arzobispo Mora y del Río | Episode: "El último Caudillo" |
| 2012 | La ruta blanca | Homero Paz | Recurring role |
| 2014 | Camelia la Texana | Don Antonio Treviño | Main role; 60 episodes |
| 2015 | El Dandy | José Luis Zamacona "El Negro" | Recurring role |
| 2016 | Dios Inc. | Erick | Recurring role; 11 episodes |
| 2016–2017 | Sin senos sí hay paraíso | Javier González "Gato Gordo" | Main role (seasons 1–2); 78 episodes |
| 2017 | Su nombre era Dolores, la Jenn que yo conocí | Mario Macías | Recurring role; 9 episodes |
| 2018 | La jefa del campeón | El Coronel | Recurring role; 12 episodes |
| 2018 | Ingobernable | Juventino | Episode: "Breaking Chains" |
| 2018–2019 | Señora Acero | Juan Román | Series regular (Season 5); 40 episodes |
| 2022 | Repatriated | Don Chucho | |
| 2026 | La oficina | Don Lover | Episode: "Don Lover" |
