= Human Resources (2023 film) =

- Theatrical release poster
- Directed by: Jesús Magaña Vázquez
- Screenplay by: Jesús Magaña Vázquez; Fernando del Razo
- Based on: Recursos humanos by Antonio Ortuño
- Produced by: Daniel Pech; Dominga Sotomayor; Omar Zúñiga
- Cinematography: Alejandro Cantú
- Edited by: Luis Arturo Cárdenas; Carlos Espinoza
- Music by: Emilio Kauderer
- Production companies: Sobrevivientes Films; Prisma Cine
- Release dates: October 24, 2023 (FICM); November 16, 2023 (Mexico); February 29, 2024 (Argentina)
- Running time: 91 minutes
- Countries: Mexico; Argentina
- Language: Spanish

Human Resources (Spanish: Recursos humanos) is a 2023 black comedy-drama film co-written and directed by Jesús Magaña Vázquez. It is based on the novel of the same name by Antonio Ortuño. The film stars Pedro de Tavira alongside by Juana Viale, Giuseppe Gamba, Daniel Tovar, Cecilia Ponce, Natalia Barraud, Hernán Sevilla and Camila Murias. It is a co-production between Mexico and Argentina.

== Synopsis ==
Gabriel Lynch is a tenacious print division supervisor who recently applied for a manager position. However, his dream will come to a halt when the position is taken by Constantino who is the son of someone important within the company. As a consequence, Gabriel will seek to orchestrate a revenge that will change everyone's destiny forever.

== Cast ==
- Antonio Ortuño as Gabriel Lynch
  - Gonzalo Lavisse as Kid Gabriel Lynch
- Juana Viale as Verónica
- Giuseppe Gamba as Constantino
- Daniel Tovar as Paruro
- Cecilia Ponce as Lizbeth
- Natalia Barraud as Carla
- Hernán Sevilla as Juan Arregui
- Camila Murias as Mirna
- María Julia Denna as Gabriel's mother
- Salvador Ferrer as Diego
- Alejandra Herrera as María
- Ulises Bueno as Himself

== Production ==
=== Development ===
After finishing the novel Recursos humanos in 2010–2011, Jesús Magaña set out to adapt it into a film after falling in love with Ortuño's book because the novel seemed to him like a version of Fight Club, but Mexican. He wrote the script with Fernando del Razo with whom he made The Alien.

=== Filming ===
Principal photography began on April 25, 2022, lasting 5 weeks in Córdoba, Argentina.

== Release ==
It had its world premiere on October 24, 2023, at the 21st Morelia International Film Festival, then was commercially released on November 16, 2023, in Mexican theaters, and on February 29, 2024, in Argentine theaters.

== Accolades ==
Year	Award	Category	Recipient	Result	Ref.
2024	66th Ariel Awards	Best Actor	Pedro De Tavira	Nominated	
2024	66th Ariel Awards	Best Adapted Screenplay	Jesús Magaña Vázquez & Fernando del Razo	Nominated	
2024	66th Ariel Awards	Best Special Effects	Lanfranco Buratini, Esteban Parodi, Nico Crespo & Jano Ubierna	Nominated	
2024	66th Ariel Awards	Best Visual Effects	Nicolás González, Ignacio Pol, Pablo Accamee, Enrique Cantú Garza V & Fernando Campos	Nominated	
