= Cecilia Ludmila Ponce =

Argentinian actress

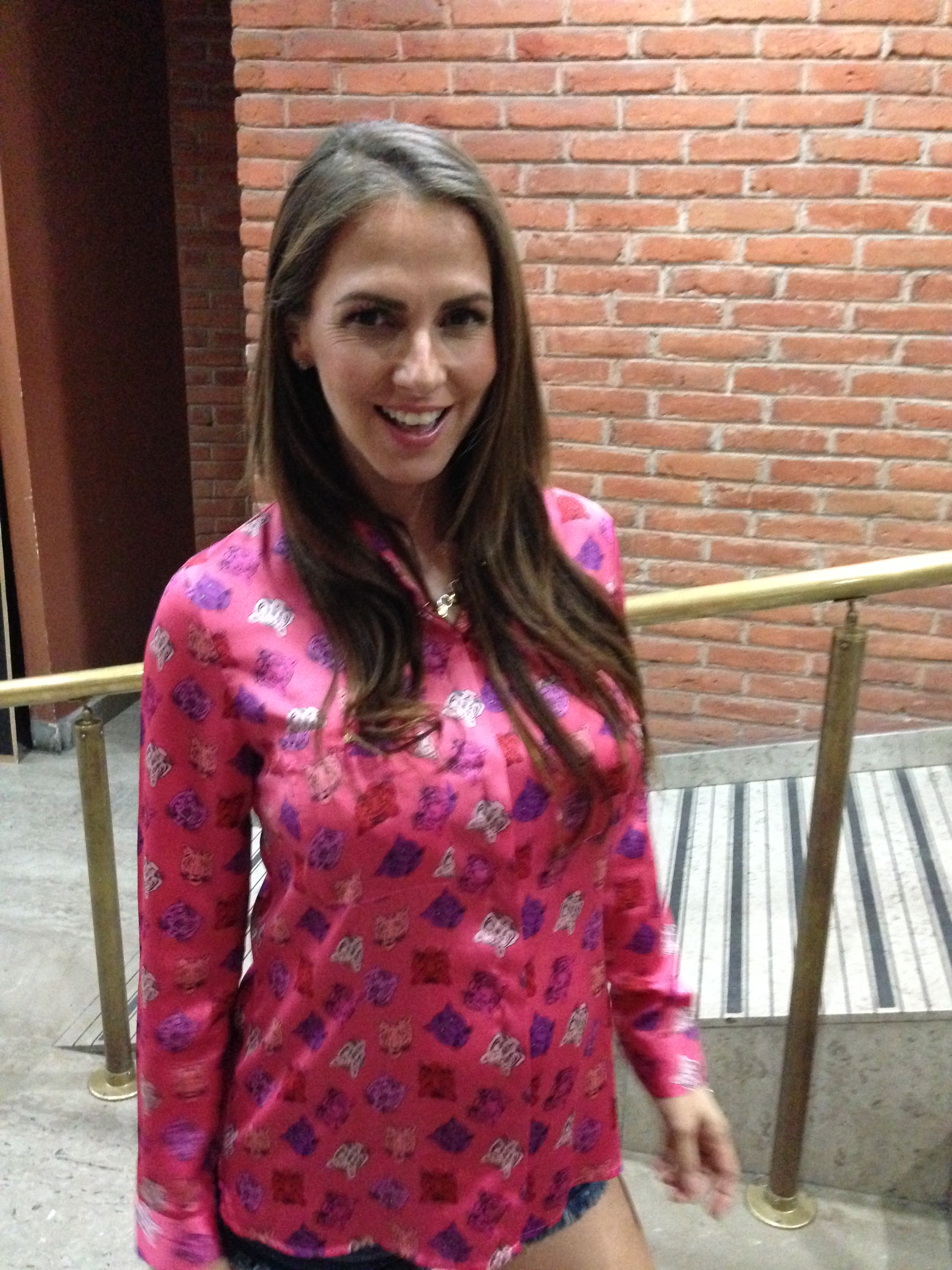
Ponce in Mexico City

Cecilia Ludmila Ponce, known simply as Ceci Ponce (Buenos Aires Argentina, December 31, 1981), is an Argentine actress. She worked in TV Azteca productions, where most of her characters were antagonistic.

Some of her starring at Telenovelas: in 2005: Amor en custodia (Mexican TV series) ... Ana Torrejón; in 2009: Vuélveme a querer (TV series) ... Corina Nieto; In 2010: Entre el amor y el deseo ... Sara Rincón Del Real; in 2012: Amor cautivo ... Eugenia Rangel Acosta in 2012-3: Los Rey Aurora Longoria; in 2014 Siempre tuya Acapulco Irán Hernández Molina; in 2021: Un dia para vivir ...Kenia; in 2022: Esta historia me suena ... Aura.

== Movies ==
- Niñas mal (2007)
- Recursos humanos (2023) as Lizbeth

== See also ==
Wikimedia.
