= The Echo (2023 film) =

2023 documentary film

- Official poster
- El Echo
- Directed by: Tatiana Huezo
- Screenplay by: Tatiana Huezo
- Produced by: Tatiana Huezo; Dalia Reyes
- Cinematography: Ernesto Pardo
- Edited by: Lucrecia Gutiérrez; Tatiana Huezo
- Music by: Leonardo Heiblum; Jacobo Lieberman
- Production company: Radiola Films
- Distributed by: The Match Factory
- Release date: 17 February 2023 (Berlinale)
- Running time: 102 minutes
- Countries: Mexico; Germany
- Language: Spanish

The Echo (Spanish: El eco) is a 2023 Mexican-German docufiction film directed by Tatiana Huezo. The film, which also includes fictional elements, portrays the children of an isolated village "El Echo", in the Mexican highlands. The film is co-produced by Germany, and was selected to receive its world premiere in the Encounters section of the 73rd Berlin International Film Festival, on 17 February 2023. On December 7, it appeared in the eligible list for consideration of Academy Award for Best Documentary Feature Film for the 96th Academy Awards.

== Plot ==
El Echo, a remote village in Puebla, the Mexican highlands, where conditions change drastically between seasons, the children tend to the sheep and take care of their elders. Dealing with the frost and drought, the children learn to understand death, illness, and love from every word and every silence of their parents. The Echo is a story about the echo of what lies in the soul, about the certainty of warmth from those around us, "about rebellion and vertigo in the face of life" and "about growing up".

== Cast ==
- Montserrat Hernández Hernández as Montse
- María de los Ángeles Pacheco Tapia as Abuela Angeles
- Luz María Vázquez González as Luz Ma
- Sarahí Rojas Hernández as Sarahí
- William Antonio Vázquez González as Toño
- Uriel Hernández Hernández as Uriel
- Ramiro Hernández Hernández as Ramiro
- Berenice Cortés Muñoz as Bere
- Andrea González Lima as Andrea

== Production ==
The film is the fifth feature film by Tatiana Huezo. Her two previous documentaries, El lugar más pequeño (2011) and Tempestad (2016), with this film forms a "trilogy of pain and trauma". She followed three families for one full year in the remote village in Mexico to film the project.

== Release ==
The film was invited to Horizons section of 57th Karlovy Vary International Film Festival, where it was screened on 30 June 2023. It was also invited to the 27th Lima Film Festival for competing in Documentary section, where it was screened on 12 August 2023. The film also made it to 'Latin Horizons' section of the 71st San Sebastián International Film Festival held from 22 to 30 September 2023.

The film was screened at 2023 BFI London Film Festival in 'Strand' section under 'Journey' theme on 8 October; and on 20 October at the Vienna International Film Festival in Features section.

== Reception ==
=== Critical response ===
On the review aggregator Rotten Tomatoes website, the film has an approval rating of 100% based on 24 reviews, with an average rating of 8.2/10. On Metacritic, it has a weighted average score of 91 out of 100 based on 5 reviews, indicating "universal acclaim".

Guy Lodge reviewing at Berlin Film Festival, for Variety wrote, "This exquisitely textured film observes how children’s lives echo those of their parents, repeating for generations on the same constantly inconstant land, until somebody breaks the pattern." Lodge stated that Tatiana Huezo "observes this splintering community with unsentimental tenderness". He opined that the traditionally-inflected score of Leonardo Heiblum and Jacobo Lieberman occasionally sweetened the proceedings. Concluding, he said, "At the close, a hot white slice of lightning breaks the screen, signaling relief after a lengthy drought, but hardly an idealized long-term solution to the greater generational problems facing El Eco." Sheri Linden for The Hollywood Reporter called the film "A resounding achievement" and quoting dialogues from the film between father and daughter which goes as: "Work is work," "It’s not easy," he adds. "You have to do it with love." Linden opined that Tatiana Huezo "in this clear-eyed and warmhearted chronicle, has done precisely that." Wendy Ide for ScreenDaily wrote in review that the film is "an intimate, immersive portrait of a way of life – its rhythms, hardships and its communal joys – told through the eyes of the young people who rarely question it." Vladan Petkovic writing for Cineuropa stated, "True to its title, The Echo is about the background, about leftovers, and things left unsaid and never done. Petkovic concluding said, "It is a beautiful film that manages to be simultaneously restrained and immersive, poetic and earthy."

=== Accolades ===
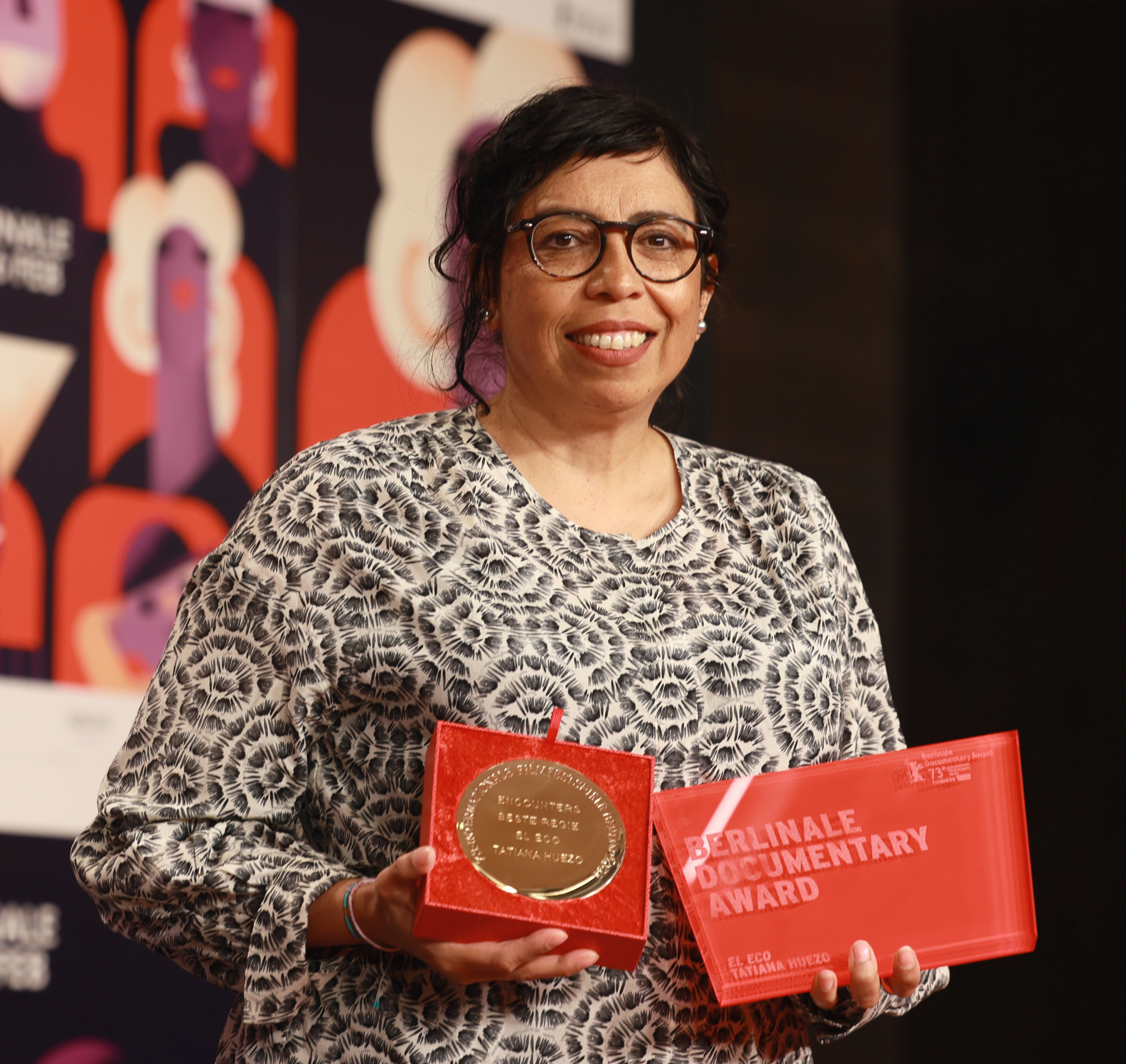
Tatiana Huezo, with the Berlinale Documentary Film Award for The Echo

Award	Date	Category	Recipient	Result	Ref.
European Work in Progress	19 October 2022	K13 Studios Award - Dolby Atmos Mixing	The Echo	Won	
Berlin International Film Festival	25 February 2023	Golden Bear Plaque	The Echo	Nominated	
Berlin International Film Festival	25 February 2023	Berlinale Documentary Film Award	The Echo	Won	
Berlin International Film Festival	25 February 2023	Encounters: Best Director	Tatiana Huezo	Won	
Seattle International Film Festival	21 May 2023	Ibero-American Competition Grand Jury Prize	The Echo	Nominated	
Jerusalem Film Festival	23 July 2023	The Nechama Rivilin Award for Best International Film	The Echo	Nominated	
Jerusalem Film Festival	23 July 2023	Chantel Akerman Award for Best Experimental Documentary	The Echo	Won	
Lima Film Festival	18 August 2023	Best Documentary	The Echo	Nominated	
Lima Film Festival	18 August 2023	CINETRAB Award for Best Documentary	The Echo	Won	
San Sebastián International Film Festival	30 September 2023	Horizons Award	The Echo	Nominated	
Athens International Film Festival	9 October 2023	Best Documentary	The Echo	Nominated	
Chicago International Film Festival	22 October 2023	Best International Documentary	The Echo	Won	
Rolling Stone en Español Awards	26 October 2023	Documentary Feature Film of the Year	The Echo	Nominated	
Cinema Eye Honors	12 January 2024	Heterodox Award	The Echo	Nominated	
Luxembourg City Film Festival	10 March 2024	2030 Award by Luxembourg Aid & Development	The Echo	Won	
Ariel Awards	7 September 2024	Best Film	The Echo	Nominated	
Ariel Awards	7 September 2024	Best Director	Tatiana Huezo	Nominated	
Ariel Awards	7 September 2024	Ariel Award for Best Documentary Feature	Tatiana Huezo	Won	
Ariel Awards	7 September 2024	Ariel Award for Best Cinematography	Ernesto Pardo	Won	
Ariel Awards	7 September 2024	Ariel Award for Best Original Music	Leonardo Heiblum and Jacobo Lieberman	Won	
Ariel Awards	7 September 2024	Ariel Award for Best Sound	Lena Esquenazi, Martin de Torcy, Jaime Baksht and Michelle Couttolenc	Nominated	
Ariel Awards	7 September 2024	Ariel Award for Best Editing	Lucrecia Gutiérrez and Tatiana Huezo	Nominated	
Sur Awards	23 July 2025	Best Ibero-American Film	The Echo	Nominated	

== See also ==
- 96th Academy Awards
- Submissions for the Academy Award for Best Documentary Feature
- Academy Award for Best Documentary Feature Film
