= Conchi León =

Playwright, actress, director

- Concepción León Mora
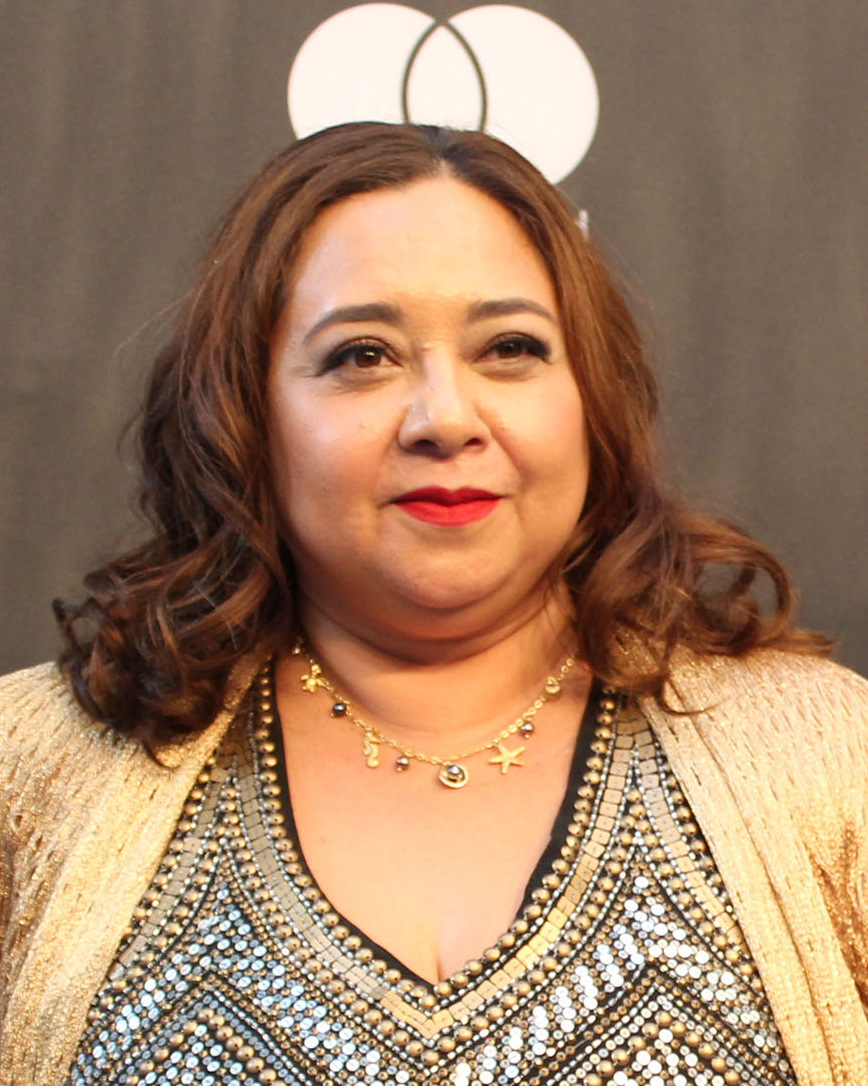
- Born: 9 December 1973 (age 52); Mérida, Yucatán, Mexico
- Notable work: Mestiza Power

Concepción León Mora (born 9 December 1973), is a playwright, actress, director, Yucatecan theater teacher and community activist. Her work incorporates the tradition, costumes and life of the Maya and the Mayan culture. She was awarded a prize for her social work through theater by the Human Rights Commission in 2011.

== Biography ==
Concepción León Mora born in Mérida, Yucatán, Mexico, 9 December 1973, is better known as Conchi León. She studied theater direction for children, literature and drama. León held an artistic residence in New York City in 2014. She has been invited by the Yucatánstate government to present her productions. León's work has been showcased in London, the United States, Argentina, Spain, Chile, the Philippines and Germany. She has used her work as a teacher to create projects for the formation and development of theater focusing on children with special needs as well as working to use theater as a means of social rehabilitation for minor offenders and the homeless. Dramatically her work raises the issues of ethnic discrimination, homophobia, violence against women and the human rights of disabled people. She works with the unique features of the Mayan culture.

She is a member of the National System of Art Creators of Mexico and founder of the Municipal Theater Company, Sa'as Tún, of Acapulco. León worked with the Yucatán newspaper Milenio to produce a column called "Where the lion dwells", dedicated to theater reviews. She also works with the Yucatán department of Culture and the arts.

== Publications ==
- "The Believers.", 2004.
- García, Óscar Armando (coord. And ed.)
- Teaching anthology of Mexican theater. 1964-2005
- León Mora Concepción "Mestiza power", 2006.
- “Everything I found in the Water”, 2009.
- Regional Trilogy: Childhood Rituals.

== Theatrical works ==
- Lion cub. Almost everything about my father.
- Extermination trials
- The kingdom of salamanders
- Still ... always
- Memories of two Caracol children
- Rain stone
- Of children, fish and other lunatic monsters
- Henequen stories
- The dark side of the force
- Tolok Paradise
- The laundry is washed at home
- Yesterday's love
- In the middle of the salty sea
- Everything I found in the water
- Mestiza Power, released on May 28, 2005, Mérida Yucatán, Mexico.
- Chronicle of a Foreboding, released on January 11, 2007, Mérida Yucatán, Mexico.
- The perfect love of two dysfunctional umbrellas, released in March 2008, Buenos Aires, Argentina.
- You will sanctify the Fiestas, premiered on October 20, 2008, Buenos Aires, Argentina.
- Puch de Amor, released on November 11, 2008, Mérida Yucatán, Mexico.
- Confessions of seven women sinning alone, released on June 3, 2009, Valencia, Spain.
- Dirty clothes are washed at home, premiered on August 11, 2009, Mérida Yucatán, Mexico.
- Metamorphosis before the Water, released on October 9, 2009, Mexico City.
- Las Huiras of the Sierra Papakal, released in October 2009, Mérida Yucatán, Mexico.
- The other cruelty. Triptych of love and thorns. 2010
- From the spring of the heart, released on June 25, 2016, Mérida Yucatán, Mexico.
- Shellside . Stories of women in prison
- The wait
- A thousand small stars
- I talked to him
- A heart without sleep
- Santiago dances
- Dzemul's Puruxones
- After eclipse
