= Upon Open Sky =

2023 Mexican crime drama film

- Directed by: Mariana Arriaga; Santiago Arriaga
- Written by: Guillermo Arriaga
- Cinematography: Julián Apezteguia
- Edited by: Andrés Pepe Estrada
- Music by: Ludovico Einaudi
- Release date: August 31, 2023 (Venice)
- Country: Mexico

Upon Open Sky (Spanish: A Cielo Abierto) is a 2023 Mexican crime drama film written by Guillermo Arriaga and directed by Mariana and Santiago Arriaga. The film premiered at the 80th edition of the Venice Film Festival.

== Cast ==
- Theo Goldin
- Federica Garcia
- Máximo Hollander
- Julio Cesar Cedillo
- Cecilia Suárez
- Manolo Cardona
- Sergio Mayer Mori
- Julio Bracho

== Release ==
The film premiered in the Orizzonti section at the 80th Venice International Film Festival. It is also set to be screened at the 48th Toronto International Film Festival, and at the 28th Busan International Film Festival in 'Flash Forward' section.
