= The Movie (2023 film) =

- Theatrical release poster
- Directed by: Max del Río
- Written by: Max del Río
- Produced by: Max del Río; Adal Trujeque
- Starring: Martín Méndez; Asaf Berrón
- Cinematography: Adal Trujeque
- Edited by: Max del Río
- Music by: David Trujeque
- Production companies: Creaciones Kush; Ola Creativa; Benuca Films
- Distributed by: Benuca Films
- Release dates: May 20, 2023 (24 Risas por Segundo); September 12, 2024 (Mexico)
- Running time: 96 minutes
- Country: Mexico
- Language: Spanish

The Movie (Spanish: La película) is a 2023 Mexican independent comedy film written, co-produced, edited and directed by Max del Río in his directorial debut. Starring Martín Méndez and Asaf Berrón. It is the first feature film made entirely in the state of Campeche, Mexico.

== Synopsis ==
Tomás and Paco are very good friends who have the dream of being recognized filmmakers, but they only make low-budget short films that no one watches. Given this, and the fact that Tomás feels that his future is uncertain, he sets out to film the first feature film in his state, Campeche, hoping to win both at film festivals, as well as money, love and respect from his loved ones. In the process, he will jeopardize his friendship with Paco who is his only true friend and collaborator.

== Cast ==
- Martín Mendez as Tomás Cruz
- Asaf Berrón as Paco
- Jorge Castro Realpozo as Tomás's dad
- Addy Arceo as Nora
- Hernán Castelot as Lucio / Ixtli
- Francisco Elox as Peluca
- Juan Amaro as Jean Paul

== Release ==
The film had its world premiere on May 20, 2023, at 7th 24 Risas por Segundo International Film and Comedy Festival, then had a limited theatrical release on September 12, 2024, in Mexico.

== Accolades ==
Year	Award / Festival	Category	Recipient	Result	Ref.
2023	7th 24 Risas por Segundo International Film and Comedy Festival	Audience Award	The Movie	Won	
