= Antonio Ortuño =

Mexican novelist and short story writer

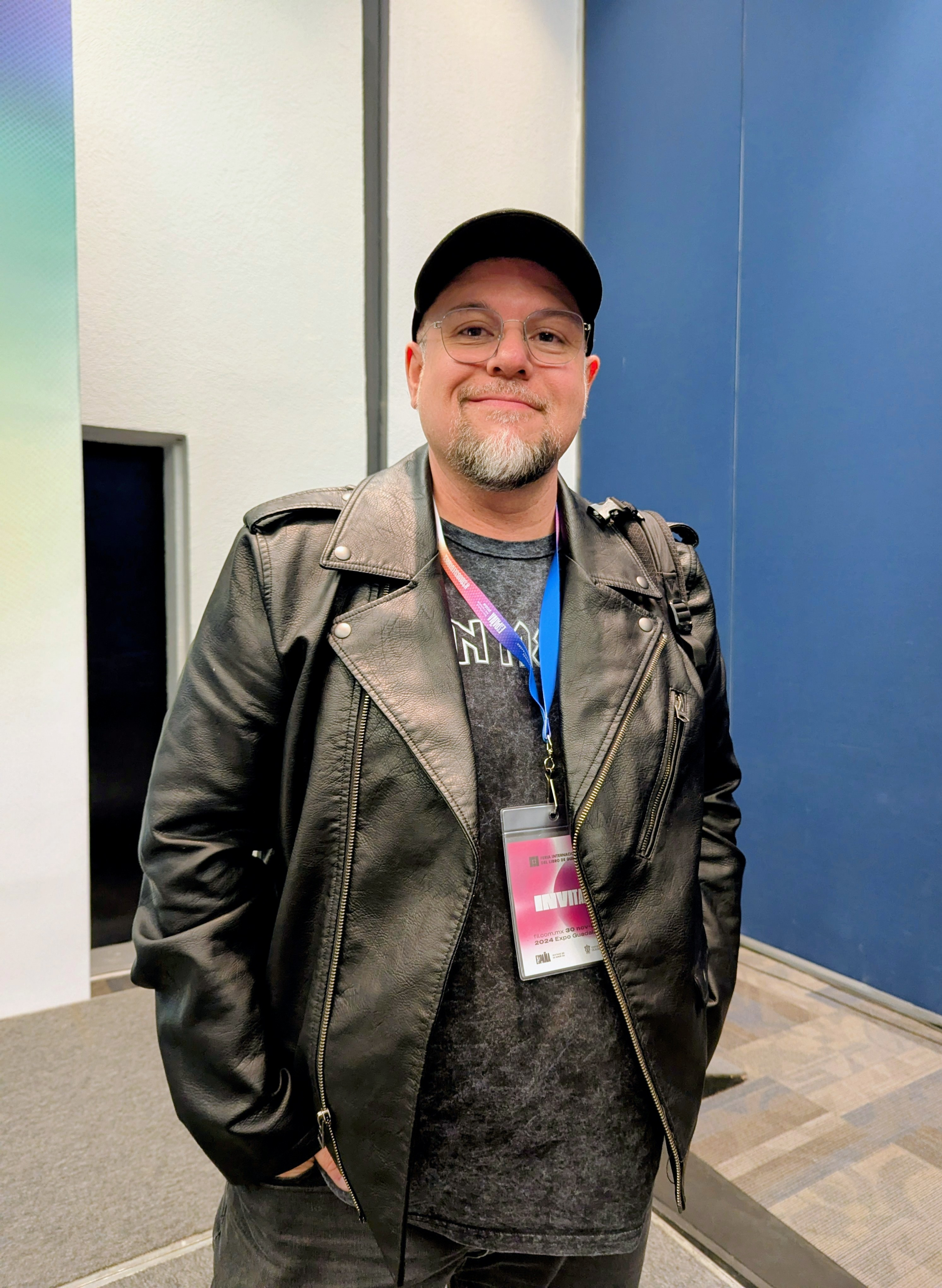
2024 Image of Antonio Ortuño

Antonio Ortuño (Guadalajara, 1976) is a Mexican novelist and short story writer.

Ortuño is the author of the novels El buscador de cabezas (2006) and Recursos humanos (2007), finalist of the Herralde Prize. He also published the short story books El jardín japonés (2007) and La Señora Rojo (2010). In 2006 the newspaper Reforma named his debut novel El buscador de cabezas the best first novel of the year. His writing has been translated into English, French, Italian, German, Croatian, Romanian and Hungarian. Critics have praised his black humor, the agility and precision of his prose and his ability to explore the contradictions of his characters.

In October 2010 the British magazine "Granta" included Ortuño in its list of the best young Spanish language writers, and the Mexican edition of the magazine "GQ" chose him as writer of the year. In November 2010 his second book of short stories La Señora Rojo was published in Spain and Mexico. In 2017. he won the Premio de Narrativa Breve Ribera del Duero.

== Works ==
- 2006: El buscador de cabezas (novel).
- 2007: Recursos humanos (novel). Finalist of the Herralde Prize.
- 2006: El jardín japonés (short stories).
- 2008: Grandes Hits Vol. 1 Nueva Generación de Narradores Mexicanos. Track 4, Lado B Carne (anthology)
- 2010: La Señora Rojo (short stories).
- 2011: Ánima (novel).
- 2013 La fila India (novel).
- 2013: No entren al 1408: Antología en español tributo a Stephen King (anthology).
- 2016: El rastro (novel).

== See also ==
- Human Resources - Film adaptation of his 2007 novel.
