= Where the Tracks End =

- Netflix release poster
- Directed by: Ernesto Contreras
- Screenplay by: Javier Peñalosa
- Based on: Where the Tracks End by Ángeles Doñantes
- Produced by: Maria Jose Cordova; Alejandro Cortés Rubiales; Rafael Ley; Mónica Vértiz
- Starring: Adriana Barraza; Kaarlo Isaacs
- Cinematography: Juan Pablo Ramírez
- Edited by: Jorge Macaya
- Music by: Gus Reyes; Andrés Sánchez
- Production companies: Netflix; Woo Films
- Distributed by: Pimienta Films; Netflix
- Release dates: May 18, 2023 (Mexico); May 26, 2023 (Netflix)
- Running time: 95 minutes
- Country: Mexico
- Language: Spanish

Where the Tracks End (Spanish: El último vagón, lit. 'The last wagon') is a 2023 Mexican comedy-drama film directed by Ernesto Contreras from a screenplay by Javier Peñalosa. Starring Adriana Barraza and Kaarlo Isaacs. It is based on the novel of the same name by Ángeles Doñantes.

== Synopsis ==
11 year old Ikal and his family live on a railway that travels across the country, as his father works in the repair and construction of railways, which prevents the family and the boy from settling in one place for a while. However, at the last stop, Ikal meets Chico, Valeria and Tuerto, friends who are students of Georgina, a teacher who does everything possible for her students to learn despite precarious circumstances. But, when everything seems to settle for Ikal at school, a new threat arrives, an inspector from the Ministry of Education, who has the mission of closing rural schools. With his sights set on Ikal's school, the inspector will see in the young man everything he has learned about the value of friendship, the importance of growing up and the inspiration that teachers can generate in the lives of students.

== Cast ==
The actors participating in this film are:

- Adriana Barraza as Teacher Georgina
- Kaarlo Isaacs as Ikal
- Memo Villegas as Hugo Valenzuela (adult Ikal)
- Diego Montessoro as Chico
- Frida Cruz as Valeria
- Ikal Paredes as Tuerto
- Teté Espinoza as Lucero
- Jeronimo Medina as Tomás
- Gabriela Cartol as Mirna
- Nova Coronel as Diamantina
- Adrián Vázquez as Mr. Ochoa
- Leonardo Alonso as Foreman
- Fátima Molina as Adult Valeria
- Sofía Domínguez Corte as Carola
- Osvani Rivera as Chesco
- Victoria Díaz as Diana Dinamita
- Blanca Guerra as Ethereal Mage

== Production ==
Principal photography took place on location at Atlangatepec, Tlaxcala; Tlapacoyan, Veracruz and Oriental, Puebla located in Mexico.

== Release ==
Where the Tracks End had a limited theatrical release on May 18, 2023, in Mexico and was later released worldwide on May 26 of the same year on Netflix.
