= Álvaro Guerrero =

Mexican actor

Álvaro Guerrero (born 26 March 1949 in Mexico City) is a Mexican actor, best known for his role as "Daniel" in the 2000 film Amores Perros. He appeared as a Jesuit in the Warner Bros. 1986 drama film The Mission, which marked his first film appearance.

== Selected filmography ==
- Between Us (2011) as Toño
- Eddie Reynolds y los ángeles de acero (2014) as Ulises
- La Civil (2021)
- Have a Nice Day! (2023) as Enrique
- Amores perros (2001) as Daniel
