= My Universe in Lower Case =

2011 film

- Film poster
- Directed by: Hatuey Viveros
- Written by: Inti Aldasoro; Ana Mata
- Starring: Moises Arizmendi
- Cinematography: Vidblaín Balvás
- Release date: 16 October 2011
- Running time: 90 minutes
- Country: Mexico
- Language: Spanish

My Universe in Lower Case (Spanish: Mi universo en minúsculas) is a 2011 Mexican drama film directed by Hatuey Viveros. It was screened at the International Film Festival of Kerala.

== Cast ==
- Moises Arizmendi as Empleado Banco
- Diana Bracho as Josefina
- Sonia Couoh as Karina
- Eugenia de la O as Gloria
- Aida Folch as Aina
- Dagoberto Gama as Jardinero
- Enoc Leaño as Cliente Tacos
- Tara Parra as Elba
