= Have a Nice Day! (film) =

- Netflix release poster
- Directed by: Yibrán Asuad
- Written by: Javier Peñalosa
- Produced by: Yibran Asuad; Gerardo Gatica González; Alberto Muffelmann; Regina Valdés
- Starring: Álvaro Guerrero; Andrea Chaparro; Eduardo Minett
- Cinematography: Martín Boege
- Music by: Zulu González; Estéban Aldrete
- Distributed by: Netflix
- Release date: March 10, 2023
- Running time: 93 minutes
- Country: Mexico
- Language: Spanish

Have a Nice Day! (Spanish: ¿Encontró lo que buscaba?, lit. 'Did you find what you were searching for?') is a 2023 Mexican comedy-drama film directed by Yibrán Asuad and written by Javier Peñalosa. Starring Álvaro Guerrero, Andrea Chaparro and Eduardo Minett. It premiered on March 10, 2023, on Netflix.

== Synopsis ==
Enrique is a former rock and roll announcer who becomes a supermarket bagger to earn money. Enrique has one goal: to go to the anniversary of the radio station where he worked and be able to meet again with the love of his life, named Irma Pimentel.

== Cast ==
The actors participating in this film are:

- Álvaro Guerrero as Enrique
- Andrea Chaparro as Amanda
- Eduardo Minett as Picho
- Sidney Robote as Ramón Ramírez
- Fernando Larragaña as Güero Jiménez
- Alejandro Suárez as Marito
- Lalo El Mimo as Chiquilingas
- Ma Eugenia Guzmán as Conseluito
- Juan Alberto Villareal as Cipriano
- Perfecto González as Manuel
- Andrés C Mayer as Willy
- Ana Sofía Gatica as "The Bomb"
- Saak as Filete Miñon
- Juca Viapri as Presenter
- Fer Manzano as Policeman
- María Tlapanco as Teresa

== Accolades ==
Year	Award	Category	Recipient	Result	Ref.
2024	66th Ariel Awards	Best Original Score	Zulu González & Estéban Aldrete	Nominated	
