= Heroic (film) =

2023 film by David Zonana

- Theatrical release poster
- Directed by: David Zonana
- Written by: David Zonana
- Produced by: Michel Franco; David Zonana; Eréndira Núñez Larios
- Starring: Santiago Sandoval Carbajal
- Cinematography: Carolina Costa
- Production companies: Teorema; Filmadora; Common Ground Pictures; Film i Väst
- Distributed by: Wild Bunch
- Release date: 21 January 2023 (Sundance)
- Running time: 88 minutes
- Countries: Mexico; Sweden
- Languages: Spanish; Nahuatl
- Box office: $1,7 million

Heroic (Spanish: Heroico) is a 2023 drama film written, directed and produced by David Zonana. An international co-production of Mexico and Sweden, it stars Santiago Sandoval Carbajal.

The film had its world premiere at the 2023 Sundance Film Festival on 21 January 2023.

== Premise ==
Luis, an Indigenous 18-year-old boy, encounters an institutionally violent system inside the Heroic Military College, which he enters in hope of a better future.

== Cast ==
- Santiago Sandoval Carbajal as Luis
- Esteban Caicedo
- Fernando Cuautle
- Mónica del Carmen
- Carlos Gerardo García
- Isabel Yudice

== Release ==
Heroic had its world premiere at the 2023 Sundance Film Festival on 21 January 2023. It was also screened in the Panorama section at the 73rd Berlin International Film Festival in February 2023. The film was awarded the Havana Star Prize for Best Film at the 24th Havana Film Festival New York in April 2024.

Prior to its release, Wild Bunch acquired its distribution rights.

== Reception ==
On the review aggregator website Rotten Tomatoes, 85% of 13 critics' reviews are positive, with an average rating of 8.4/10.

Erin Brady from /Film wrote: "Heroic is likely a movie that won't work for everyone, as a few intentionally horrifying moments of casual brutality will have viewers squirming. However, by utilizing the camera as an intensely rigid weapon, the film drives home its intentions in a way that's neither overbearing nor vague. It is a powerful example of the power of visual storytelling, of allowing the technical aspects of movies to tell a painful story in a way mere words cannot." Meanwhile, Jordan Mintzer from The Hollywood Reporter wrote: "There are no real surprises in Heroic, which sets its course to hell in the opening scene and follows a straight path there for the next 90 minutes. We learn little about Luis beyond the fact that his dad, who abandoned the family, was a soldier as well, or that his mother’s cancer is the only reason he entered the academy."
