= 73rd Berlin International Film Festival =

2023 film festival in Berlin, Germany

- Official festival poster
- Opening film: She Came to Me by Rebecca Miller
- Closing film: On the Adamant by Nicolas Philibert
- Location: Berlin, Germany
- Founded: 1951
- Awards: Golden Bear: On the Adamant by Nicolas Philibert
- Directors: Mariette Rissenbeek
- Artistic director: Carlo Chatrian
- No. of films: 287
- Festival date: Opening: 16 February 2023; Closing: 26 February 2023
- Website: www.berlinale.de

Berlin International Film Festival
- 74th 72nd

The 73rd annual Berlin International Film Festival, usually called the Berlinale (German pronunciation: [bɛʁliˈnaːlə]), took place from 16 to 26 February 2023. It was the first completely in-person Berlinale since the 70th in 2020. The festival added a new competition section for television series.

The festival opened with American filmmaker and novelist Rebecca Miller's drama film She Came to Me. A live video stream with Ukrainian President Volodymyr Zelenskyy was part of the opening ceremony, which was accompanied by a speech by jury member Golshifteh Farahani on the Mahsa Amini protests in Iran. On 21 February 2023, American filmmaker Steven Spielberg was presented with the Honorary Golden Bear for lifetime achievement by Irish singer-songwriter Bono. Spielberg's films were screened in the Homage section for the occasion.

On the Adamant, directed by French filmmaker Nicolas Philibert, won the Golden Bear. The Silver Bear Grand Jury Prize was awarded to Afire by German filmmaker Christian Petzold. The Silver Bear for Best Leading Performance was awarded to Sofía Otero for 20,000 Species of Bees; Otero, at age nine, became the youngest winner of the award in the Berlinale history.

Festival closed on 26 February with total sales of tickets touching 320,000, and around 20,000 accredited professionals from 132 countries including 2,800 media representatives attending the festival.

== Background ==
The film registration for the festival began in September 2022 with the closing date for submission fixed on 23 November 2022. On 13 October 2022, with the slogan of "Let's Get Together", signifying in-person interactions in all the programmes of the festival after two years of the programmes held online due to COVID-19. It was also announced that Berlinale Series Award would be inaugurated in 2023.

The festival poster was designed by Claudia Schramke, who had also created the previous year's Berlinale poster. The executive director of the Berlinale, Mariette Rissenbeek, described the poster as the key visual for the 2023 Berlinale, saying that it directed the attention toward the audience—the indispensable core of the festival. Rissenbeek said, "We're very pleased that with this year's poster, we can honour those whose curiosity, enthusiasm, and applause make the Berlinale a vibrant, inspiring, and joyful event."

== Opening and closing ceremonies ==
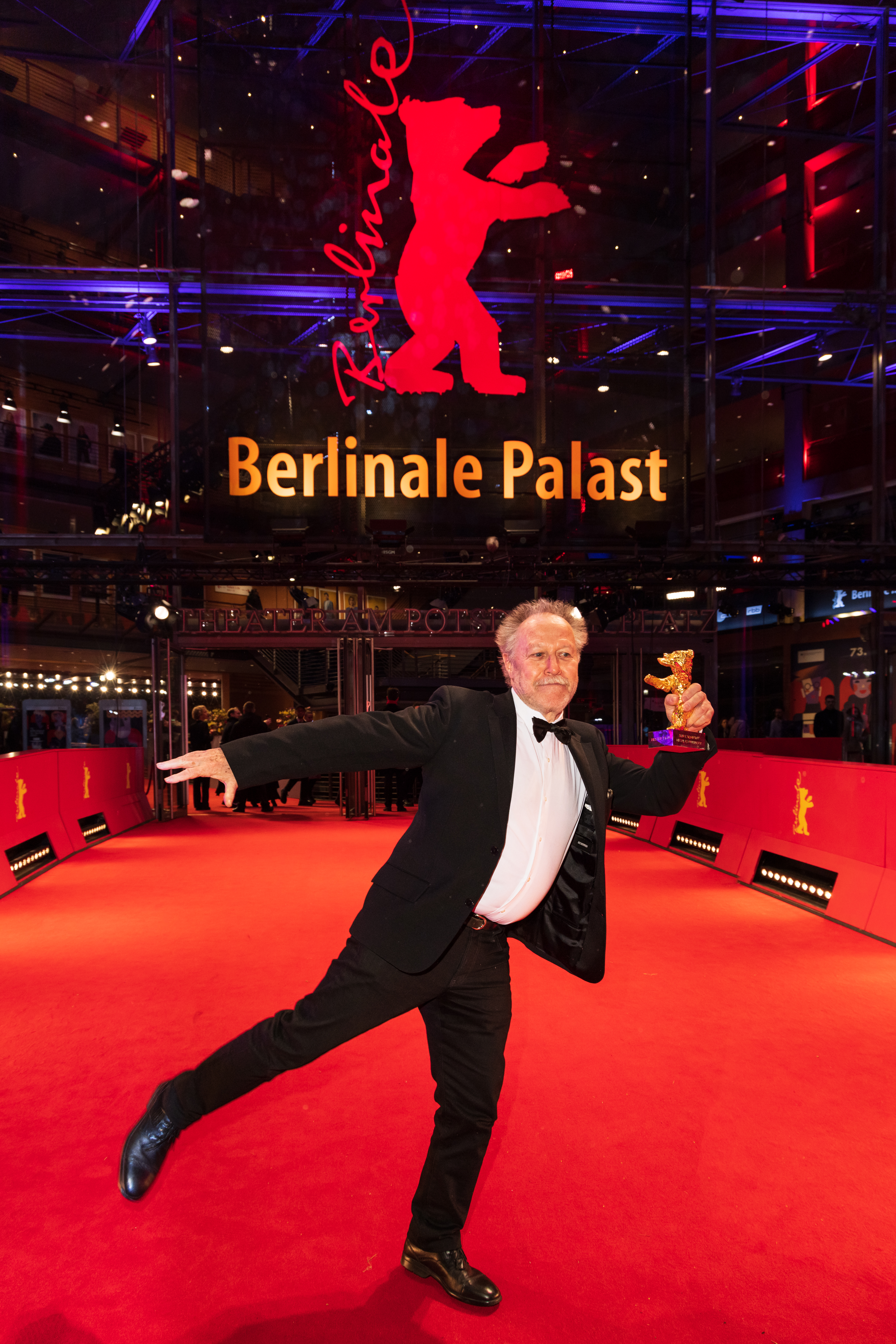
Nicolas Philibert, with the Golden Bear on the red carpet in front of the Berlinale Palast

The opening ceremony of the festival was held on 16 February with jury members and international and German stars walking the red carpet. The jury president Kristen Stewart, in her opening speech, pointed out about "oppressions against our physical selves". She said that, albeit she was a woman, she represented "the least marginal version of a woman". On that topic, Golshifteh Farahani, Iranian-French actress and one of the jury members, noted that "some women are not as fortunate".

Russia's war on Ukraine and Human rights in the Islamic Republic of Iran were topical discussions at the ceremony. After Ukrainian President Volodymyr Zelenskyy appeared via satellite and introduced by American actor and filmmaker Sean Penn, Zelenskyy remarked, "A logical question comes up: On which side should culture and art be?" and added, "Can art be outside of politics? Should cinema be outside of politics? It's an eternal question but today it is extremely [pertinent]." Afterward, the opening film of the festival, Rebecca Miller's drama film She Came to Me, was screened.

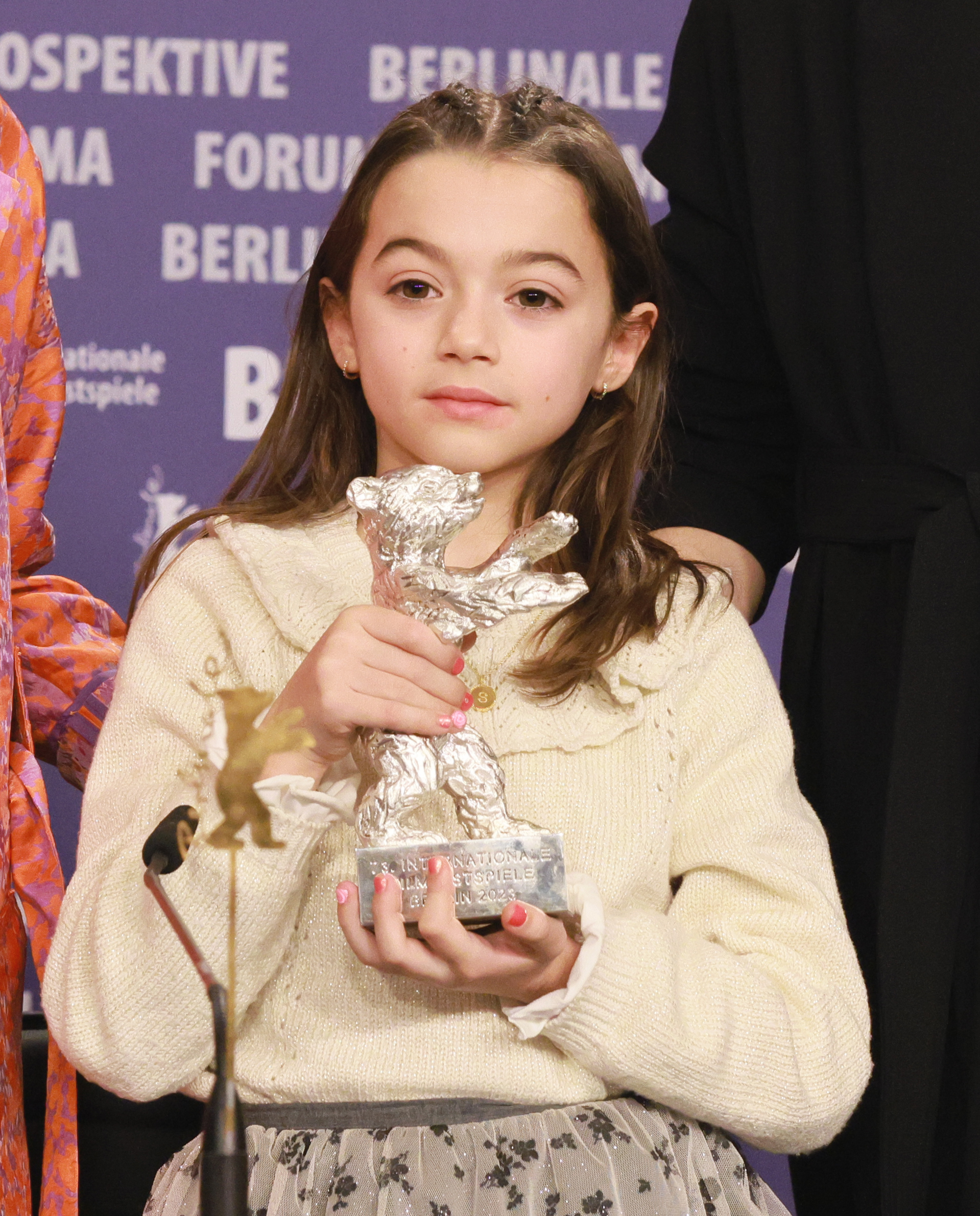
Sofía Otero, with the Silver Bear for Best Leading Performance for 20,000 Species of Bees

The closing ceremony or award night was held on 25 February, hosted by the German radio and television presenter Hadnet Tesfai. French documentary film On the Adamant, about a Paris daycare centre for people with mental disorders, by Nicolas Philibert won the Golden Bear. Stewart called the film "masterfully crafted" and a "cinematic proof of the vital necessity of human expression". Philibert asked in his acceptance speech if the jury members were "crazy" and yet nevertheless thanked them, saying "that documentary can be considered to be cinema in its own right touches me deeply".

The Silver Bear Grand Jury Prize was won by Afire by Christian Petzold. Sofía Otero, a nine-year-old girl was the winner of Silver Bear for Best Leading Performance for the role of eight-year-old Lucía in 20,000 Species of Bees. She became the youngest winner of the gender-neutral award in the Berlinale history. Stewart commented that Otero had defied "a system designed to diminish the intelligence of the performer", particularly that of child performers. After the ceremony, Otero said to the press that she wanted to dedicate her life to acting. The ceremony closed with a screening of the Golden-Bear winning film On the Adamant.

== Juries ==
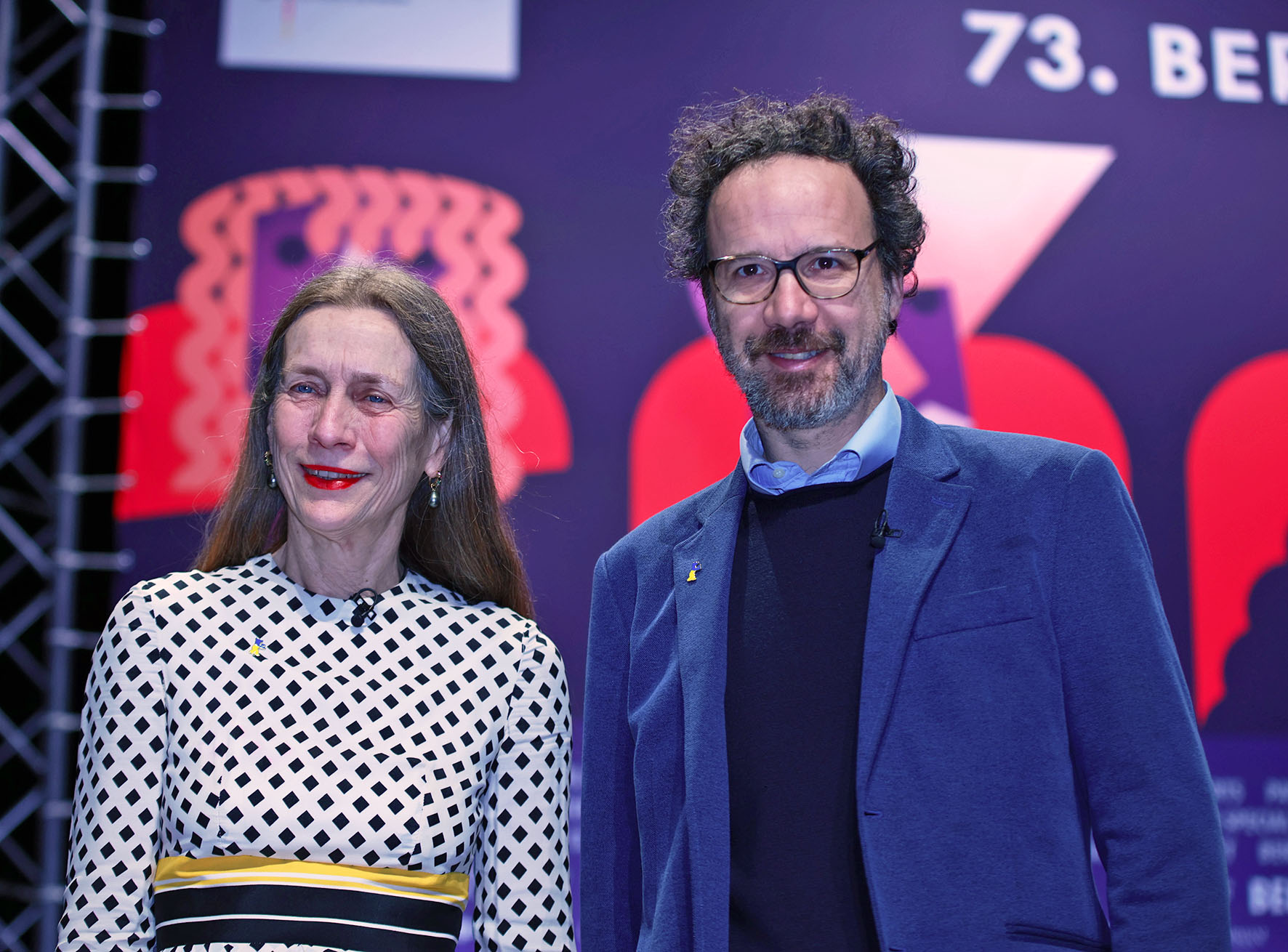
Managing Director, Mariëtte Rissenbeek and artistic director, Carlo Chatrian

=== Main Competition ===
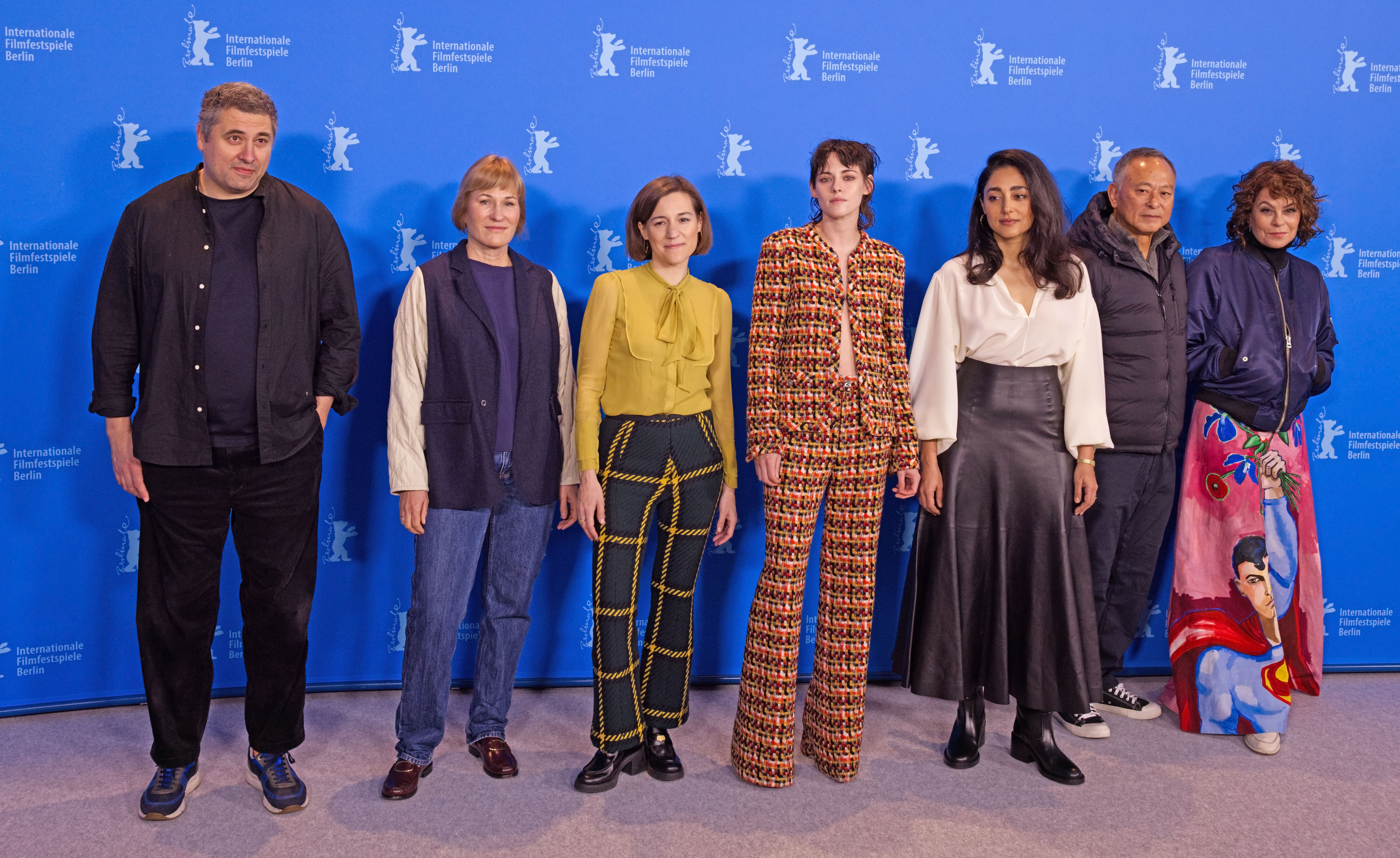
Main Competition jury

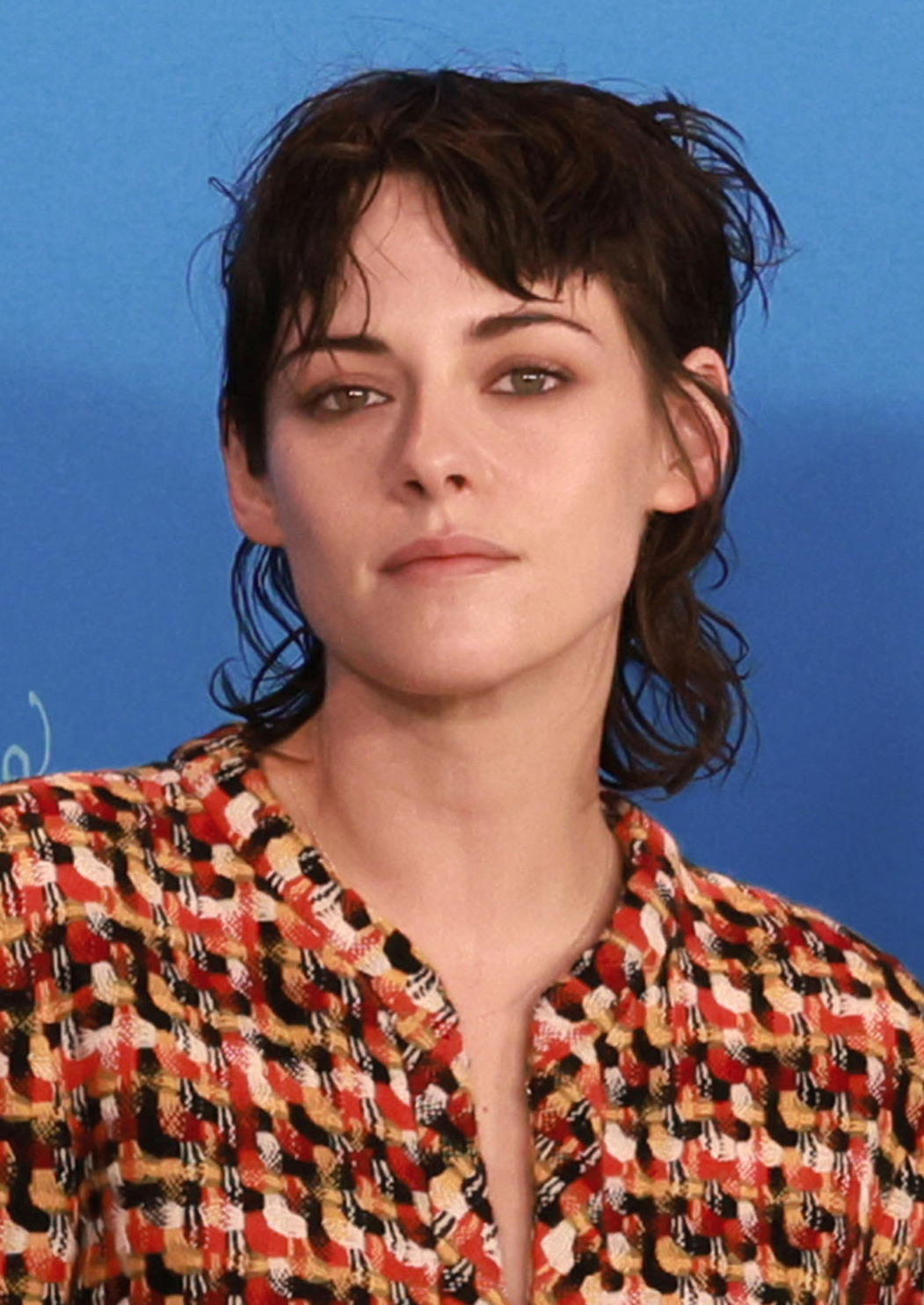
Kristen Stewart, Jury President

The following were on the jury for the Berlinale Main Competition section:

- Kristen Stewart, American actor, director, and screenwriter (Jury President)
- Golshifteh Farahani, Iranian-French actor
- Valeska Grisebach, German director and screenwriter
- Radu Jude, Romanian director and screenwriter
- Francine Maisler, American casting director and producer
- Carla Simón, Spanish director and screenwriter
- Johnnie To, Hong Kong director and producer

=== Encounters ===
- Angeliki Papoulia, Greek actress and theatre director
- Dea Kulumbegashvili, Georgian film director and writer
- Paolo Moretti, Italian festival programmer and academic

=== International Short Film ===
- Cătălin Cristuțiu, Romanian editor
- Sky Hopinka, American visual artist and filmmaker
- Isabelle Stever, German director and screenwriter

=== Generation Kplus International ===
- Venice Atienza, Filipino documentarist
- Alise Ģelze, Latvian producer
- Gudrun Sommer, German festival programmer

=== Generation 14plus International ===
- Kateryna Gornostai, Ukrainian film director, screenwriter and film editor
- Fion Mutert, German cinematographer and media educator
- Juanita Onzaga, Colombian filmmaker and artist

=== GWFF Best First Feature Award ===
- Judith Revault d'Allonnes, French festival programmer
- Ayten Amin, Egyptian director
- Cyril Schäublin, Swiss film director

=== Documentary Award ===
- Emilie Bujès, artistic director of Switzerland's Visions du Réel
- Diana Bustamante, Colombian producer, director and programmer
- Mark Cousins, Northern Irish director and writer

=== Berlinale Series Award ===
- André Holland, American actor
- Danna Stern, Israeli international executive, founder of Shtisel and Your Honor firm, Yes Studios
- Mette Heeno, Danish screenwriter, showrunner and executive producer

=== Perspektive Deutsches Kino ===
- Dela Dabulamanzi, German actor
- Anne Fabini, German film editor
- Jöns Jönsson, Swedish director

=== Heiner Carow Prize ===
- Freya Arde, German film composer, guitarist and music producer
- Peter Kahane, German director
- Mirko Wiermann, German film archivist .

== Official sections ==
=== Main Competition ===
The following 19 films were selected for the main competition for the Golden Bear and Silver Bear awards:

English title	Original title	Director(s)	Production country
20,000 Species of Bees (Note: Nominated for the GWFF Best First Feature Award) (Note: Nominated for the Teddy Award for the Best Feature Film)	20.000 especies de abejas	Estibaliz Urresola Solaguren	Spain
Afire	Roter Himmel	Christian Petzold	Germany
Art College 1994		Liu Jian	China
Bad Living	Mal Viver	João Canijo	Portugal, France
BlackBerry		Matt Johnson	Canada
Disco Boy		Giacomo Abbruzzese	Italy
Ingeborg Bachmann – Journey into the Desert	Ingeborg Bachmann – Reise in die Wüste	Margarethe von Trotta	Germany, Switzerland, Austria, Luxembourg
Limbo		Ivan Sen	Australia
Manodrome		John Trengove	United Kingdom, United States
Music		Angela Schanelec	Germany, France, Serbia
On the Adamant (Note: Nominated for the Berlinale Documentary Award)	Sur l'Adamant	Nicolas Philibert	France, Japan
Past Lives		Celine Song	United States
The Plough	Le grand chariot	Philippe Garrel	France, Switzerland
The Shadowless Tower	白塔之光	Zhang Lü	China
Someday We'll Tell Each Other Everything	Irgendwann werden wir uns alles erzählen	Emily Atef	Germany
The Survival of Kindness		Rolf de Heer	Australia
Suzume	すずめの戸締まり	Makoto Shinkai	Japan
Till the End of the Night	Bis ans Ende der Nacht	Christoph Hochhäusler	Germany
Tótem		Lila Avilés	Mexico, Denmark, France

=== Berlinale Special Events ===
The following titles received were selected for the sections below:

English title	Original title	Director(s)	Production country
Berlinale Special Gala
Golda		Guy Nattiv	United States, United Kingdom
Kiss the Future		Nenad Cicin-Sain	Slovenia
Last Night of Amore	L'ultima notte di Amore	Andrea Di Stefano	Italy
Seneca – On the Creation of Earthquakes		Robert Schwentke	Germany, Morocco
She Came to Me (opening film)		Rebecca Miller	US
Sun and Concrete	Sonne und Beton	David Wnendt	Germany
Superpower		Sean Penn, Aaron Kaufman	United States
Tár		Todd Field	United States, Germany
Boom! Boom!: The World vs. Boris Becker		Alex Gibney	United States, United Kingdom
Berlinale Special
100 Years of Disney Animation – a Shorts Celebration		Walt Disney, Dave Hand, Ben Sharpsteen, Lauren Jackson, Wilfred Jackson, Jack Hannah, Jon Kahrs, Brian Menz, Jacob Frey, Hillary Bradfield	United States
Infinity Pool		Brandon Cronenberg	Canada
The Innocents	Les Innocentes	Anne Fontaine	France, Poland
Kill Boksoon	길복순	Byun Sung-hyun	South Korea
Loriot's Great Cartoon Revue		Peter Geyer, Loriot	Germany
Love to Love You, Donna Summer		Roger Ross Williams, Brooklyn Sudano	United States
Mad Fate	命案	Soi Cheang	Hong Kong, China
#Manhole	#マンホール	Kazuyoshi Kumakiri	Japan
Massimo Troisi: Somebody Down There Likes Me	Laggiù qualcuno mi ama	Mario Martone	Italy
Measures of Men	Der vermessene Mensch	Lars Kraume	Germany
Talk to Me		Danny and Michael Philippou	Australia

=== Encounters ===
The following 16 films are selected for the Encounters section:

English title	Original title	Director(s)	Production country
Absence	雪云	Wu Lang	China
The Adults		Dustin Guy Defa	United States
The Cage is Looking for a Bird	Kletka ishet ptitsu	Malika Musaeva	France, Russian Federation
Eastern Front	Shidniy front (Східний фронт)	Vitaly Mansky, Yevhen Titarenko	Latvia, Czechia, Ukraine, United States
The Echo	El eco	Tatiana Huezo	Mexico, Germany
Here		Bas Devos	Belgium
Family Time	Mummola	Tia Kouvo	Finland, Sweden
In the Blind Spot	Im toten Winkel	Ayşe Polat	Germany
In Water	물 안에서	Hong Sang-soo	South Korea
The Klezmer Project	Adentro mío estoy bailando	Leandro Koch, Paloma Schahmann	Argentina, Austria
Living Bad	Viver Mal	João Canijo	Portugal, France
My Worst Enemy	Mon pire ennemi	Mehran Tamadon	France, Switzerland
Orlando, My Political Biography (Note: Nominated for the Teddy Award for the Best Feature Documentary/Essay Films)	Orlando, ma biographie politique	Paul B. Preciado	France
Samsara		Lois Patiño	Spain
The Walls of Bergamo	Le mura di Bergamo	Stefano Savona	Italy
White Plastic Sky	Müanyag égbolt	Tibor Bánóczki, Sarolta Szabó	Hungary, Slovakia

=== Berlinale Series Competition ===
English title	Original title	Director(s)	Production country
Agent		Nikolaj Lie Kaas	Denmark
The Architect	Arkitekten	Kerren Lumer-Klabbers	Norway
Bad Behaviour		Corrie Chen	Australia
The Good Mothers	Le buone madri	Elisa Amoruso, Julian Jarrold	Italy
Roar	Dahaad	Reema Kagti, Ruchika Oberoi	India
Spy/Master		Christopher Smith	Germany, Romania
Why Try to Change Me Now	平原上的摩西	Zhang Dalei	China
Out of Competition
The Swarm	Der Schwarm	Barbara Eder, Philipp Stölzl, Luke Watson	Germany, France, Italy, Japan, Austria, Sweden, Switzerland

=== Berlinale Short Films Competition ===
English title	Original title	Director(s)	Production country
8		Anaïs-Tohé Commaret	France
A Kind of Testament		Stephen Vuillemin	France
Back		Yazan Rabee	Netherlands
A Woman in Makueni	Mwanamke Makueni	Daria Belova, Valeri Aluskina	Germany
All Tomorrow's Parties	我的朋友	Zhang Dalei	China
The Beads	As Miçangas	Rafaela Camelo, Emanuel Lavor	Brazil
Bear	Ours	Morgane Frund	Switzerland
Daughter and Son	亲密	Cheng Yu	China
Daydreaming So Vividly About Our Spanish Holidays	La herida luminosa	Christian Avilés	Spain
Dipped in Black	Marungka tjalatjunu	Matthew Thorne, Derik Lynch	Australia
Eeva		Morten Tšinakov, Lucija Mrzljak	Estonia, Croatia
From Fish to Moon		Kevin Contento	United States
Happy Doom		Billy Roisz	Austria
It's a Date		Nadia Parfan	Ukraine
Jill, Uncredited		Anthony Ing	United Kingdom
Les chenilles		Michelle Keserwany, Noel Keserwany	France
Sleepless Nights	Nuits blanches	Donatienne Berthereau	France
Terra Mater – Mother Land		Kantarama Gahigiri	Rwanda, Switzerland
The Veiled City		Natalie Cubides-Brady	United Kingdom
The Waiting	Das Warten	Volker Schlecht	Germany

=== Panorama ===
The following films are selected for the Panorama section:

English title	Original title	Director(s)	Production country
After		Anthony Lapia	France
All the Colours of the World Are Between Black and White		Babatunde Apalowo	Nigeria
Ambush	Ghaath	Chhatrapal Ninawe	India
The Burdened	Al Murhaqoon	Amr Gamal	Yemen, Sudan, Saudi Arabia
The Beast in the Jungle	La Bête dans la jungle	Patric Chiha	France, Belgium, Austria
The Castle	El castillo	Martín Benchimol	Argentina
Drifter		Hannes Hirsch	Germany
Do You Love Me?	Ty mene lubysh? (Ти мене любиш?)	Tonia Noyabrova	Ukraine, Sweden
Femme		Sam H. Freeman, Ng Choon Ping	United Kingdom
Green Night	绿夜	Han Shuai	Hong Kong, China
Hello Dankness		Soda Jerk	Australia
Heroic	Heroico	David Zonana	Mexico, Sweden
Inside		Vasilis Katsoupis	Greece, Germany, Belgium
Matria		Álvaro Gago	Spain
Midwives	Sages-femmes	Léa Fehner	France
Opponent	Motståndaren	Milad Alami	Sweden
Passages		Ira Sachs	France
Perpetrator		Jennifer Reeder	United States, France
Property	Propriedade	Daniel Bandeira	Brazil
The Quiet Migration	Stille Liv	Malene Choi	Denmark
Reality		Tina Satter	United States
Silver Haze		Sacha Polak	Netherlands, United Kingdom
Sira		Apolline Traoré	Burkina Faso, France, Germany, Senegal
The Siren (opening film)	La Sirène	Sepideh Farsi	France, Germany, Luxembourg, Belgium
Sisi & I	Sisi & Ich	Frauke Finsterwalder	Germany, Switzerland, Austria
The Teachers' Lounge	Das Lehrerzimmer	İlker Çatak	Germany
Documentary Competition
And, Towards Happy Alleys		Sreemoyee Singh	India
The Cemetery of Cinema	Au cimetière de la pellicule	Thierno Souleymane Diallo	France, Senegal, Guinea, Saudi Arabia
The Eternal Memory		Maite Alberdi	Chile
Iron Butterflies	Залізні метелики	Roman Liubyi	Ukraine, Germany
Joan Baez: I Am a Noise		Karen O'Connor, Miri Navasky, Maeve O'Boyle	United States
Kokomo City		D. Smith	United States
Stams		Bernhard Braunstein	Austria
Transfariana		Joris Lachaise	France, Colombia
Under the Sky of Damascus		Heba Khaled, Talal Derki, Ali Wajeeh	Denmark, Germany, United States, Syria

=== Perspektive Deutsches Kino ===
The following films are selected for the Perspektive Deutsches Kino (lit. 'Perspective on German Cinema') section:

English title	Original title	Director(s)	Production country
A Hologram for the King		Tom Tykwer	United States, Germany
Ararat		Engin Kundag	Germany
Ash Wednesday		Bárbara Santos, João Pedro Prado	Germany
Bones and Names	Knochen und Namen	Fabian Stumm	Germany
Dora or the Sexual Neuroses of Our Parents	Dora oder die sexuellen Neurosen unserer Eltern	Stina Werenfels	Germany
Elaha		Milena Aboyan	Germany
Jacob the Liar	Jakob der Lügner	Frank Beyer	Germany
Kash Kash		Lea Najjar	Germany
The Kidnapping of the Bride	El secuestro de la novia	Sophia Mocorrea	Germany
Lonely Oaks	Vergiss Meyn Nicht	Fabiana Fragale, Kilian Kuhlendahl, Jens Mühlhoff	Germany
Long Long Kiss	Langer Langer Kuss	Lukas Röder	Germany
Nuclear Nomads	Nomades du nucléaire	Kilian Armando Friedrich, Tizian Stromp Zargari	Germany
On Mothers and Daughters	Geranien	Tanja Egen	Germany
Requiem		Hans-Christian Schmid	Germany
Seven Winters in Tehran	Sieben Winter in Teheran	Steffi Niederzoll	Germany
Tehran Taboo	Teheran Tabu	Ali Soozandeh	Germany, Austria

=== Forum ===
The following films are selected for the Forum section:

English title	Original title	Director(s)	Production country
Allensworth		James Benning	US
Anqa		Helin Çelik	Austria, Spain
About Thirty	Arturo a los treinta	Martin Shanly	Argentina
Being in a Place – A Portrait of Margaret Tait		Luke Fowler	United Kingdom
The Bride		Myriam U. Birara	Rwanda
Cidade Rabat		Susana Nobre	Portugal, France
Concrete Valley		Antoine Bourges	Canada
Dearest Fiona		Fiona Tan	Netherlands
De Facto		Selma Doborac	Austria, Germany
The Intrusion	O estranho	Flora Dias, Juruna Mallon	Brazil, France
The Temple Woods Gang	Le Gang des Bois du Temple	Rabah Ameur-Zaïmeche	France
Leaving and Staying	Gehen und Bleiben	Volker Koepp	Germany
Horse Opera		Moyra Davey	United States
Between Revolutions	Între revoluții	Vlad Petri	Romania, Croatia, Qatar, Iran
There Is a Stone	Ishi ga aru	Tatsunari Ota	Japan
Where God Is Not	Jaii keh khoda nist	Mehran Tamadon	France, Switzerland
The Trial	El juicio	Ulises de la Orden	Argentina, Italy, France, Norway
Calls from Moscow	Llamadas desde Moscú	Luís Alejandro Yero	Cuba, Germany, Norway
Mammalia		Sebastian Mihăilescu	Romania, Poland, Germany
Our Body	Notre corps	Claire Simon	France
A Golden Life	Or de vie	Boubacar Sangaré	Burkina Faso, Benin, France
Notes from Eremocene	Poznámky z Eremocénu	Viera Čákanyová	Slovakia, Czechia
The Face of the Jellyfish	El rostro de la medusa	Melisa Liebenthal	Argentina
Remembering Every Night	Subete no Yoru wo Omoidasu	Yui Kiyohara	Japan
This Is the End		Vincent Dieutre	France
Forms of Forgetting	Unutma Biçimleri	Burak Çevik	Turkey
Regardless of Us	우리와 상관없이	Yoo Heong-jun	South Korea
In Ukraine	W Ukrainie	Tomasz Wolski, Piotr Pawlus	Poland
Forum Special
The Devil Queen	A Rainha Diaba	Antonio Carlos da Fontoura	Brazil
I Heard It Through the Grapevine		Dick Fontaine	United States
Forum Special Fiktionsbescheinigung
Aufenthaltserlaubnis		Antonio Skármeta	Germany
An Autumn in the Little Country of Bärwalde	Ein Herbst im Ländchen Bärwalde	Gautam Bora	Germany
Battle of the Sacred Tree	Der Kampf um den heiligen Baum	Wanjiru Kinyanjui	Germany, Kenya
Black Head	Kara Kafa	Korhan Yurtsever	Turkey
A Lover & Killer of Colour		Wanjiru Kinyanjui	Germany
I, Your Mother	Man Sa Yay	Safi Faye	Germany, Senegal
My Father the Guestworker	Mein Vater, der Gastarbeiter	Yüksel Yavuz	Germany
Other than That, I'm Fine	Onun Haricinde, İyiyim	Eren Aksu	Germany, Turkey
All in Order	Ordnung	Sohrab Shahid-Saless	Federal Republic of Germany
Oyoyo		Chetna Vora	German Democratic Republic
Forum Expanded
The Tree	A árvore	Ana Vaz	Spain, Brazil
AI: African Intelligence		Manthia Diawara Portugal, Senegal, Belgium	
Black Strangers		Dan Guthrie	United Kingdom
Conspiracy		Simone Leigh, Madeleine Hunt-Ehrlich	United States
Desert Dreaming		Abdul Halik Azeez	Sri Lanka
The early rain which washes away the chaff before spring rains	Der frühe Regen wäscht die Spreu weg vor dem Frühlingsregen	Heiko-Thandeka Ncube	Germany
Exhibition		Mary Helena Clark	United States
Home Invasion		Graeme Arnfield	United Kingdom
If You Don't Watch the Way You Move		Kevin Jerome Everson	United States
Mangosteen		Tulapop Saenjaroen	Thailand
The Man Who Envied Women		Yvonne Rainer	United States
In-between World	Zwischenwelt	Cana Bilir-Meier	Germany
Forum Expanded Exhibition
Achala		Tenzin Phuntsog	United States
Borrowing a Family Album		Tamer El Said	Egypt
Comrade leader, comrade leader, how nice to see you		Walid Raad	United States
Dancing Boy		Tenzin Phuntsog	United States
Dreams		Tenzin Phuntsog	United States
Father Mother	Pala Amala	Tenzin Phuntsog	United States

=== Generation ===
English title	Original title	Director(s)	Production country
Generation Kplus
Aaaah!		Osman Cerfon	France
Cinderella		Walt Disney, Wilfred Jackson, Clyde Geronimi, Hamilton Luske	United States
Dede Is Dead	Deniska umřela	Philippe Kastner	Czech Republic
Deep Sea	深海	Tian Xiaopeng	People's Republic of China
A Greyhound of a Girl		Enzo D'Alò	Luxembourg, Italy, Ireland, United Kingdom, Latvia, Estonia, Germany
Just Super	Helt super	Rasmus A. Sivertsen	Norway
Pond	Tümpel	Lena von Döhren, Eva Rust	Switzerland
Somni		Sonja Rohleder	Germany
Spin & Ella		An Vrombaut	Belgium
To Be Sisters	Entre deux sœurs	Darvazeye royaha	France
George-Peterland	Gösta Petter-land	Christer Wahlberg	Sweden
Closing Dynasty		Lloyd Lee Choi	United States
Dancing Queen		Aurora Gossé	Norway
Dusk	Timis	Awa Moctar Gueye	Senegal
I Woke Up With a Dream	Desperté con un sueño	Pablo Solarz	Argentina
Gaby's Hills	Gaby les collines	Zoé Pelchat	Canada
Kiddo		Zara Dwinger	Netherlands
Magma		Luca Meisters	Netherlands
Nanitic		Carol Nguyen	Canada
Sea Sparkle	Zeevonk	Domien Huyghe	Belgium, Netherlands
She – Hero	Mimi	Mira Fornay	Slovakia
The Shift	Sværddrage	Møller Hansen	Denmark
Sweet As		Jub Clerc	Australia
Xiaohui and His Cows	小晖和他的牛	Xinying Lao	People's Republic of China
Of Dreams in the Dream of Another Mirror	De songes au songe d'un autre miroir	Yunyi Zhu	France
Waking Up in Silence		Mila Zhluktenko, Daniel Asadi Faezi	Germany
Generation 14plus - Documentary Competition
And the King Said, What a Fantastic Machine		Axel Danielson, Maximilien Van Aertryck	United States
Crushed		Ella Rocca	Switzerland
Dreams' Gate	Darvazeye royaha	Negin Ahmadi	Iran, Norway, France
Hummingbirds		Silvia Del Carmen Castaños	United States
When a Rocket Sits on the Launch Pad	火箭发射时	Bohao Liu	People's Republic of China, United States
Ramona		Victoria Linares Villegas	Dominican Republic
To Write From Memory		Emory Chao Johnson	United States
We Will Not Fade Away	Ми не згаснемо	Alisa Kovalenko	Ukraine, France, Poland
Generation 14plus - Feature or Short Competition
Adolfo		Sofía Auza	United States, Mexico
Autobio-Pamphlet	Aatmapamphlet	Ashish Avinash Bende	India
Almamula		Juan Sebastian Torales	Argentina, France, Italy
Before Madrid	Antes de Madrid	Ilén Juambeltz, Nicolás Botana	Uruguay
Delegation	Ha'Mishlahat	Asaf Saban	Israel, Poland, Germany
Hito		Stephen Lopez	Philippine
Incroci		Francesca de Fusco	United States, Germany
Infantry	Infantaria	Laís Santos Araújo	Brazil
The Lost Boys	Le Paradis	Zeno Graton	Belgium, France
Madden		[Malin Ingrid Johansson	Sweden
Ma mère et moi		Emma Branderhorst	Netherlands
Mirror Mirror		Sandulela Asanda	South Africa
Catching Birds	Mise à nu	with Anna Stanic, Fethi Aidouni, Marin Judas	Germany, Austria, France
And Me, I'm Dancing Too	Man khod, man ham miraghsam	Mohammad Valizadegan	Germany, Czechia, Iran
Tomorrow Is a Long Time	明天比昨天长久	Jow Zhi Wei	Singapore, Taiwan, France, Portugal
Mutt		Vuk Lungulov-Klotz	United States
From the Corner of My Eyes	Szemem sarka	Domonkos Erhardt	Hungary
Sica		Carla Subirana	Spain
Simo		Aziz Zoromba	Canada
When Will It Be Again Like It Never Was Before	Wann wird es endlich wieder so, wie es nie war	Sonja Heiss	Germany
Now.Here	一时一刻	Hao Zhao	China

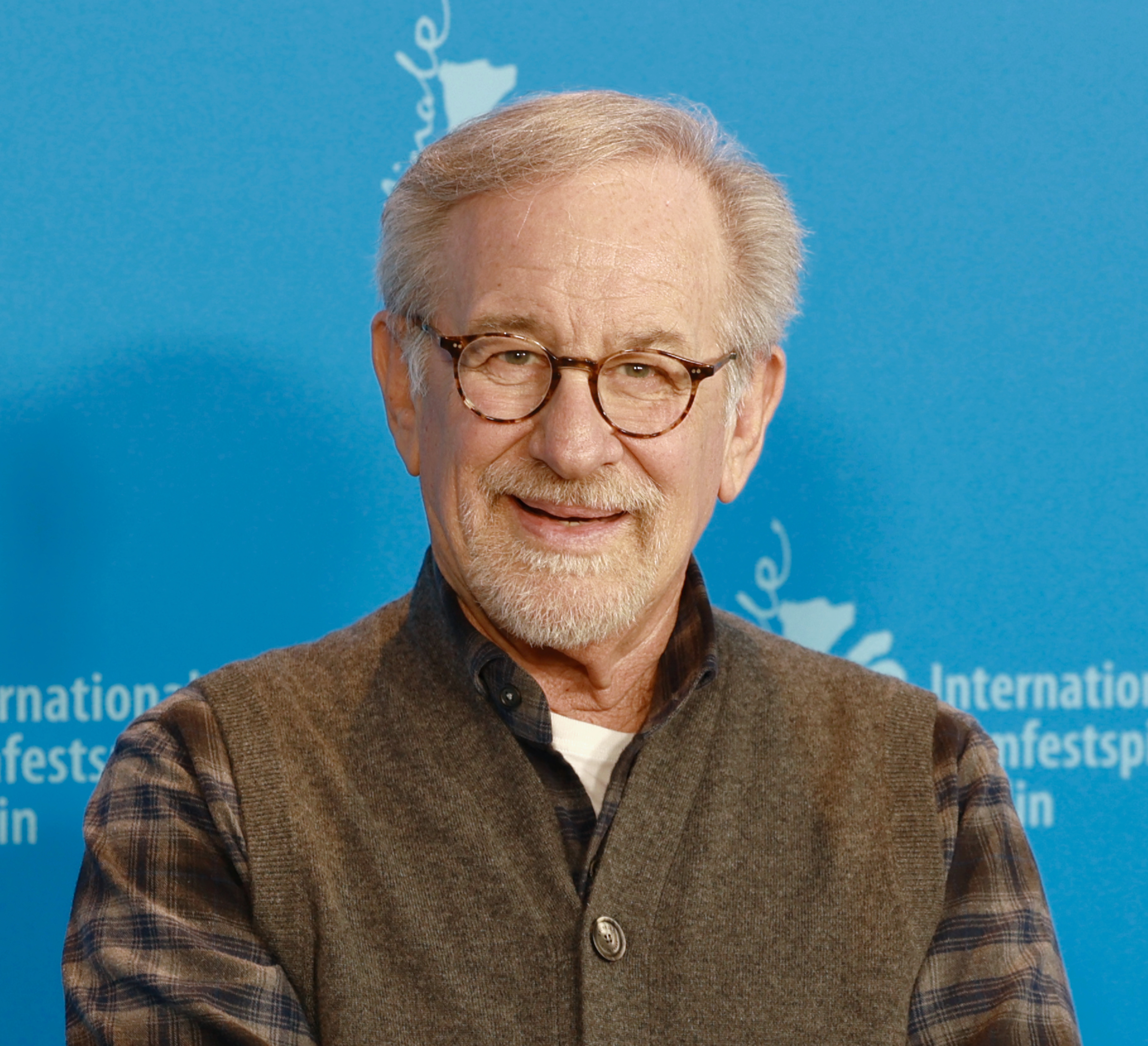
Steven Spielberg during Berlinale Events

=== Homage films ===
This section of the 73rd Berlinale was dedicated to American filmmaker, screenwriter, and producer Steven Spielberg, who was awarded an Honorary Golden Bear for lifetime achievement.

Year	Original Title	Director	Production Country
2015	Bridge of Spies	Steven Spielberg	United States, Germany, United Kingdom
1971	Duel	Steven Spielberg	United States
1982	E.T. the Extra-Terrestrial	Steven Spielberg	United States
2022	The Fabelmans	Steven Spielberg	United States
1975	Jaws	Steven Spielberg	United States
2005	Munich	Steven Spielberg	United States, Canada, France
1981	Raiders of the Lost Ark	Steven Spielberg	United States
1993	Schindler's List	Steven Spielberg	United States

=== The Retrospective ===
This section presented the following films:

Year	English title	Original title	Director(s)	Production country
1983	To Our Loves	À nos amours	Maurice Pialat	France
1956	Unvanquished	অপরাজিত	Satyajit Ray	India
1988	Sound and Fury	De bruit et de fureur	Jean-Claude Brisseau	France
1973	The Spirit of the Beehive	El espíritu de la colmena	Víctor Erice	Spain
1986	Ferris Bueller's Day Off		John Hughes	United States
1969	The Beautiful Girl	Gražuolė	Arūnas Žebriūnas	USSR, Lithuania
1993	Groundhog Day		Harold Ramis	United States
1974	The Enigma of Kaspar Hauser	Jeder für sich und Gott gegen alle	Werner Herzog	West Germany
1996	Bag of Rice	Kiseye Berendj	Mohammad-Ali Talebi	Iran, Japan
1971	The Last Picture Show		Peter Bogdanovich	United States
1953	Little Fugitive		Ray Ashley, Morris Engel, Ruth Orkin	United States
1975	Manila in the Claws of Light	Maynila, sa mga Kuko ng Liwanag	Lino Brocka	Philippines
1994	Muriel's Wedding		P. J. Hogan	Australia
1964	Before the Revolution	Prima della rivoluzione	Bernardo Bertolucci	Italy
1955	Rebel Without a Cause		Nicholas Ray	United States

=== The Classics ===
A 4K restoration of David Cronenberg's Naked Lunch opened the classics section.

Year	English title	Original title	Director(s)	Production country
1967	Guess Who's Coming to Dinner		Stanley Kramer	United States
1988	Mapantsula		Oliver Schmitz	South Africa, Australia, United Kingdom
1991	Naked Lunch		David Cronenberg	Canada, United Kingdom, Japan
1941	Romeo and Juliet in the Village	Romeo und Julia auf dem Dorfe	Valerien Schmidely, Hans Trommer	Switzerland
1981	Sweet Dreams	Sogni d'oro	Nanni Moretti	Italy
1990	Twilight	Szürkület	György Fehér	Hungary
1923	A Woman of Paris		Charlie Chaplin	United States
1956	Night River	夜の河	Kōzaburō Yoshimura	Japan

== Official Awards ==
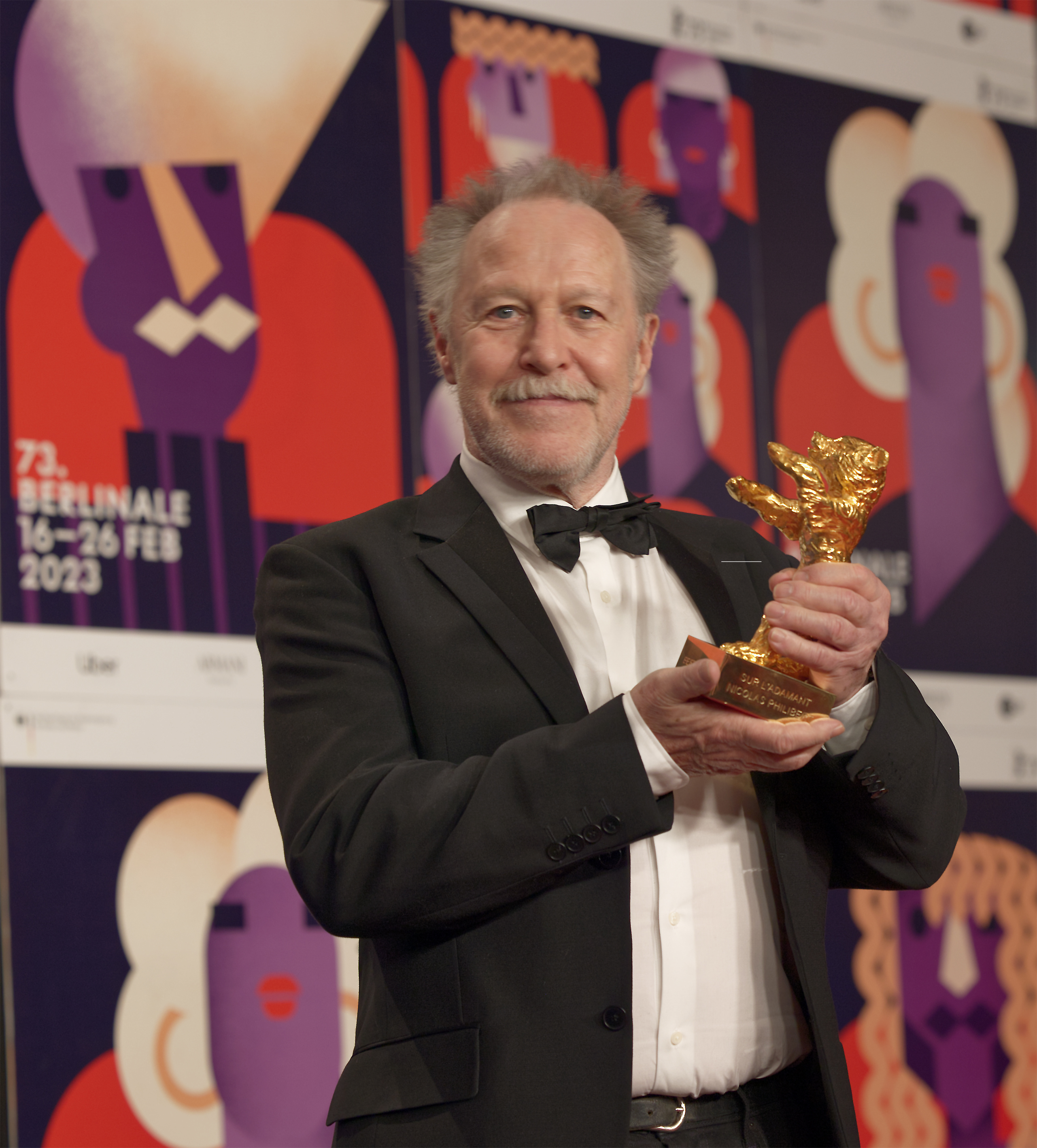
Nicolas Philibert, with the Golden Bear for On the Adamant

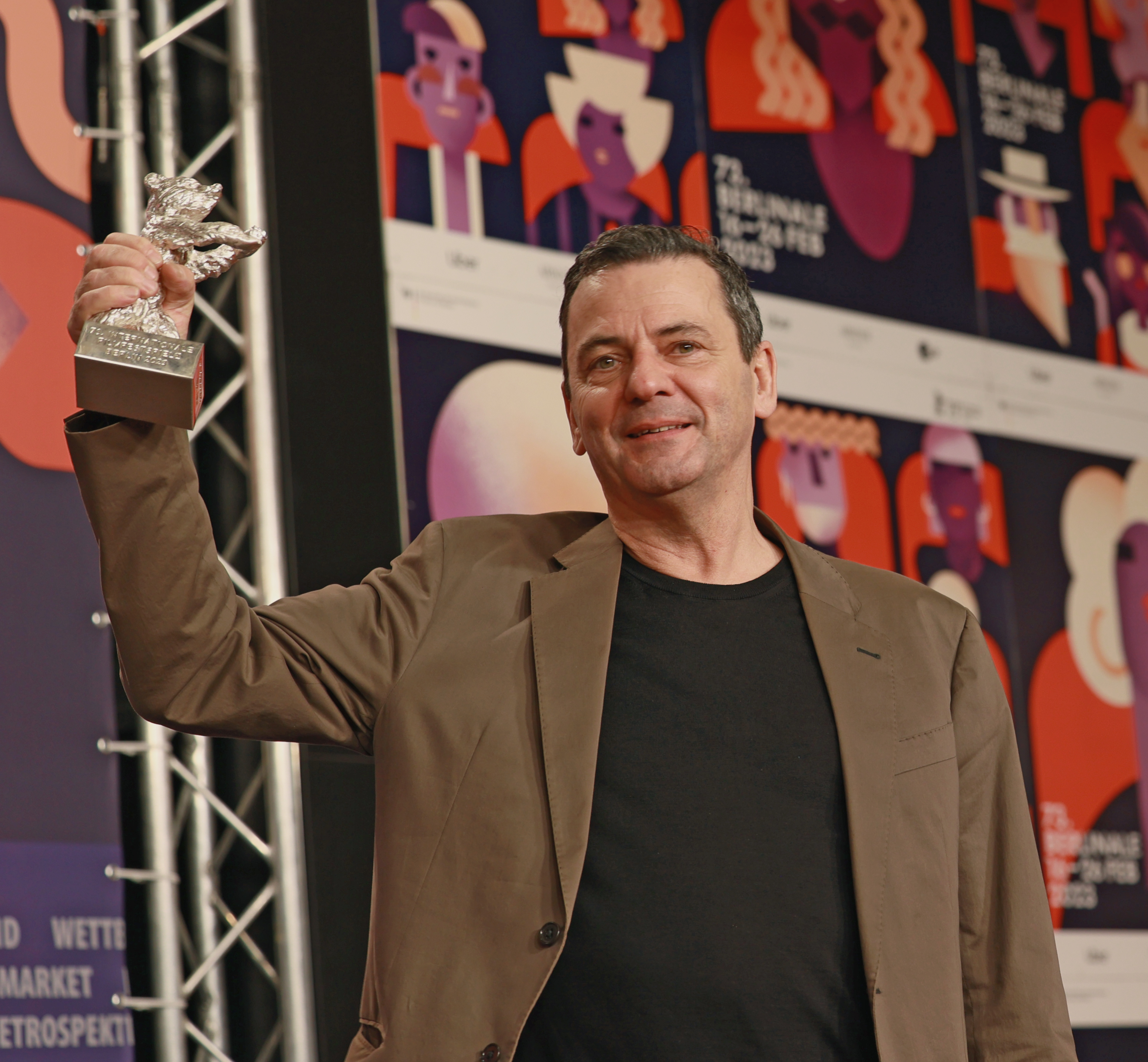
Christian Petzold, with the Silver Bear Grand Jury Prize for Afire

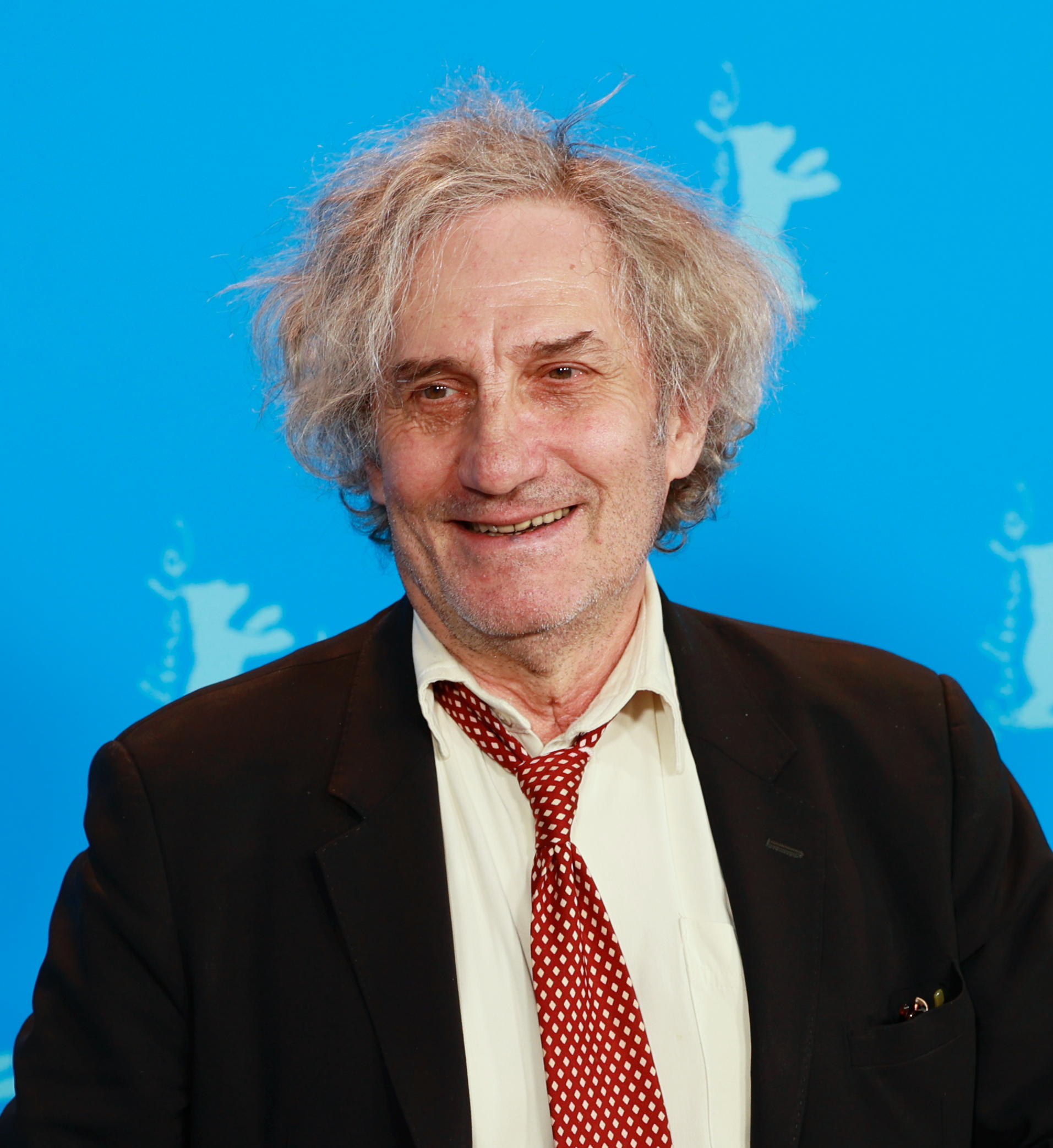
Philippe Garrel, winner of the Silver Bear for Best Director

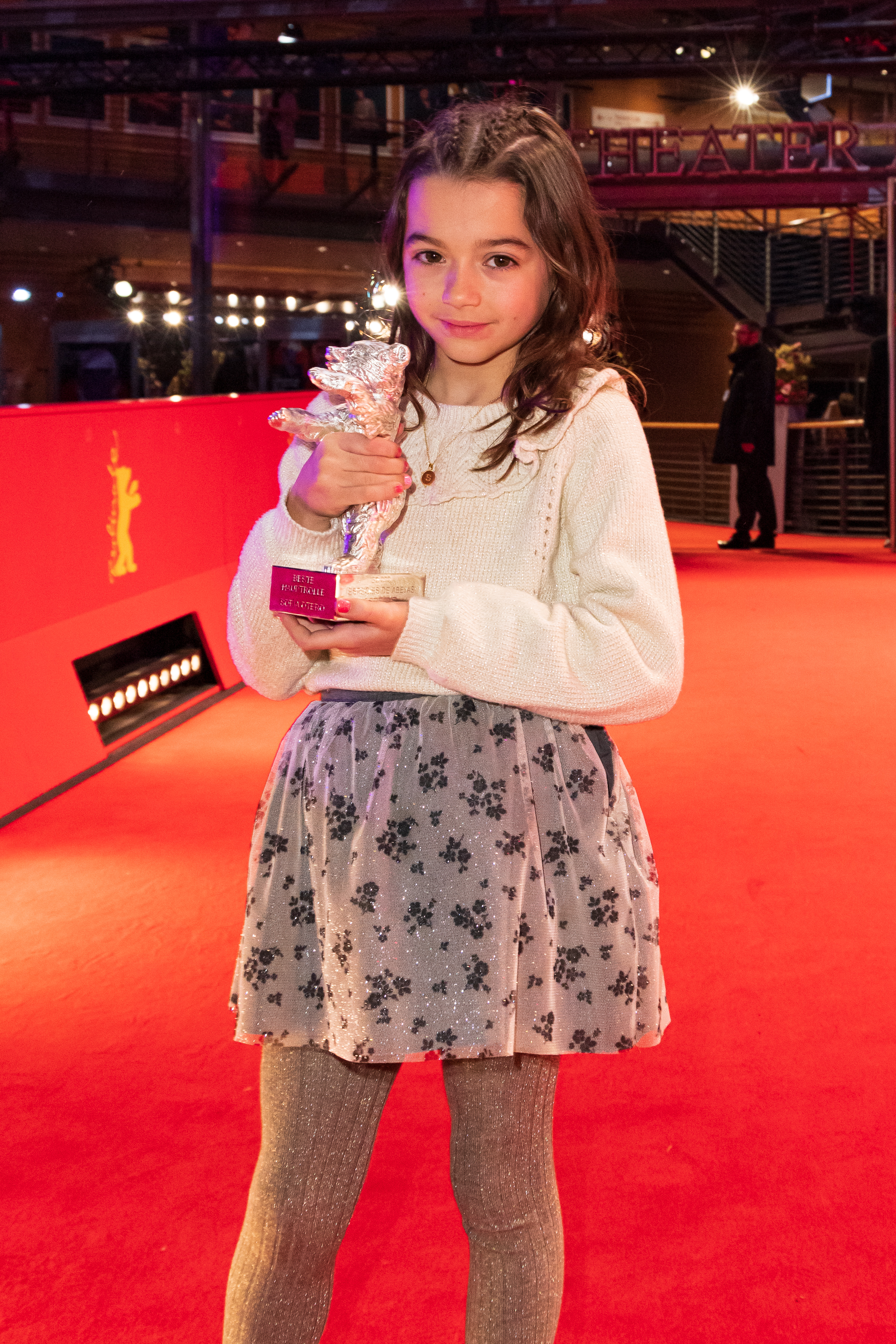
Sofía Otero, winner of the Silver Bear for Best Leading Performance for 20,000 Species of Bees

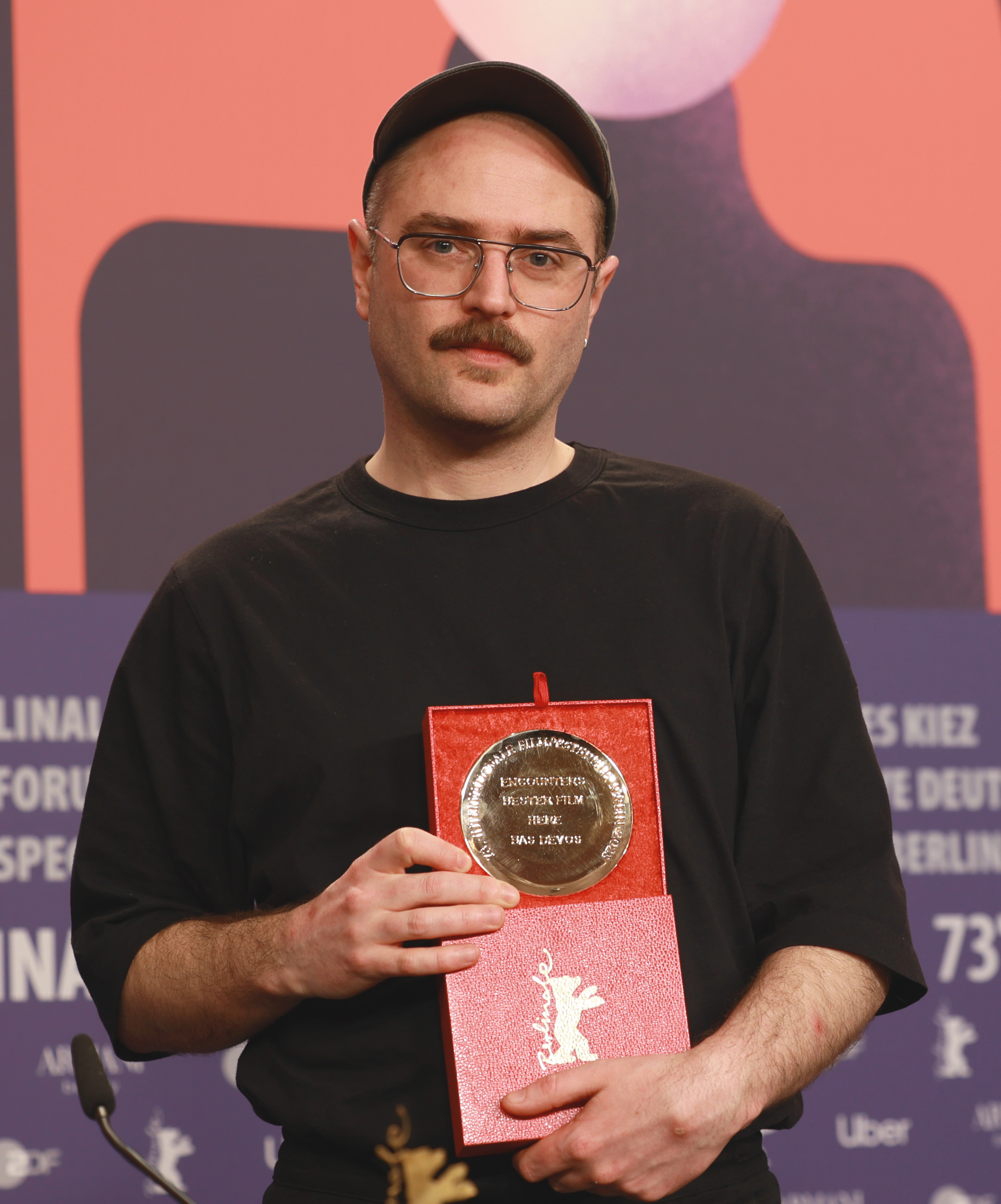
Bas Devos, with the Best Film (Encounters) for Here

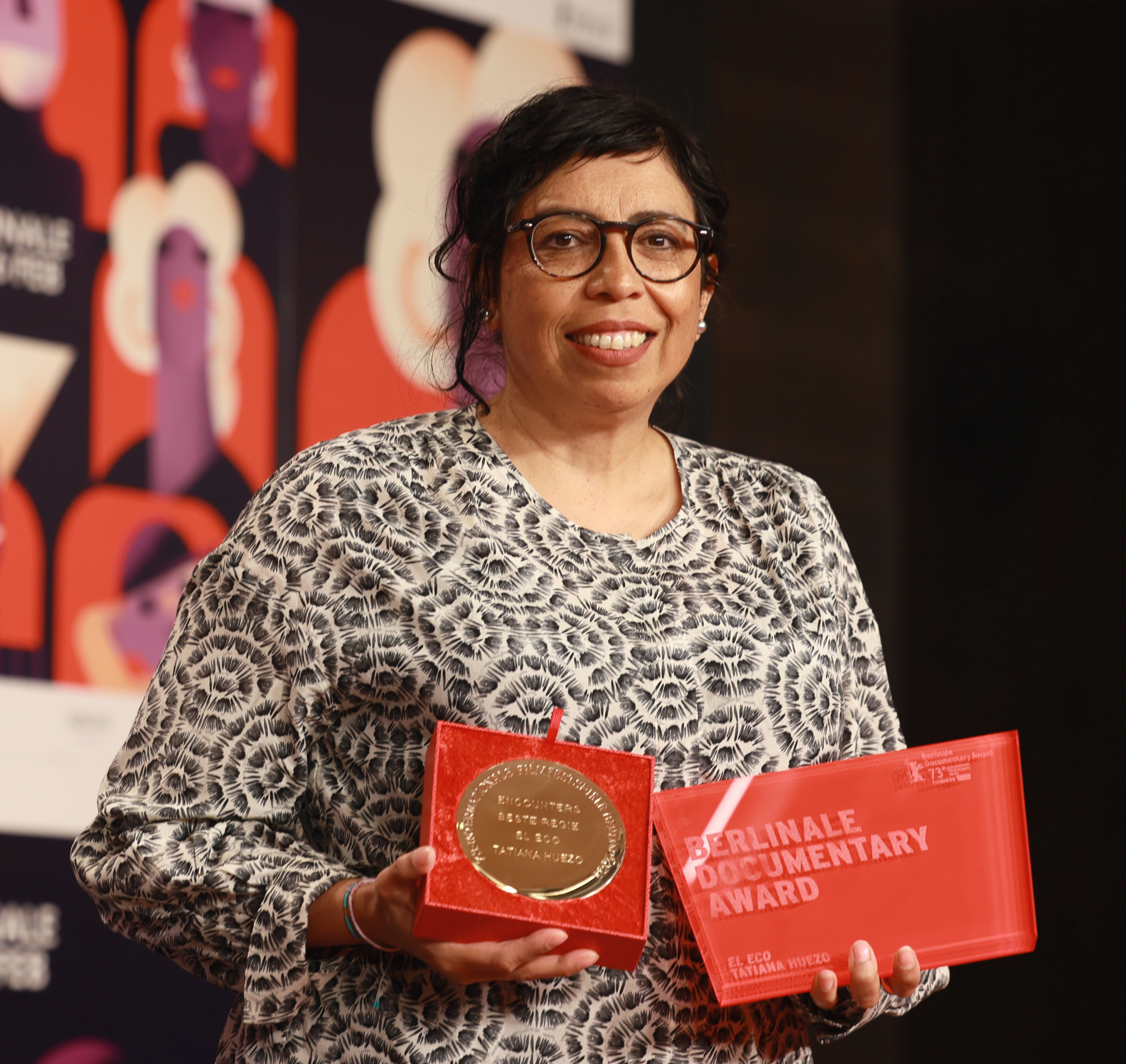
Tatiana Huezo, with the Berlinale Documentary Film Award for The Echo

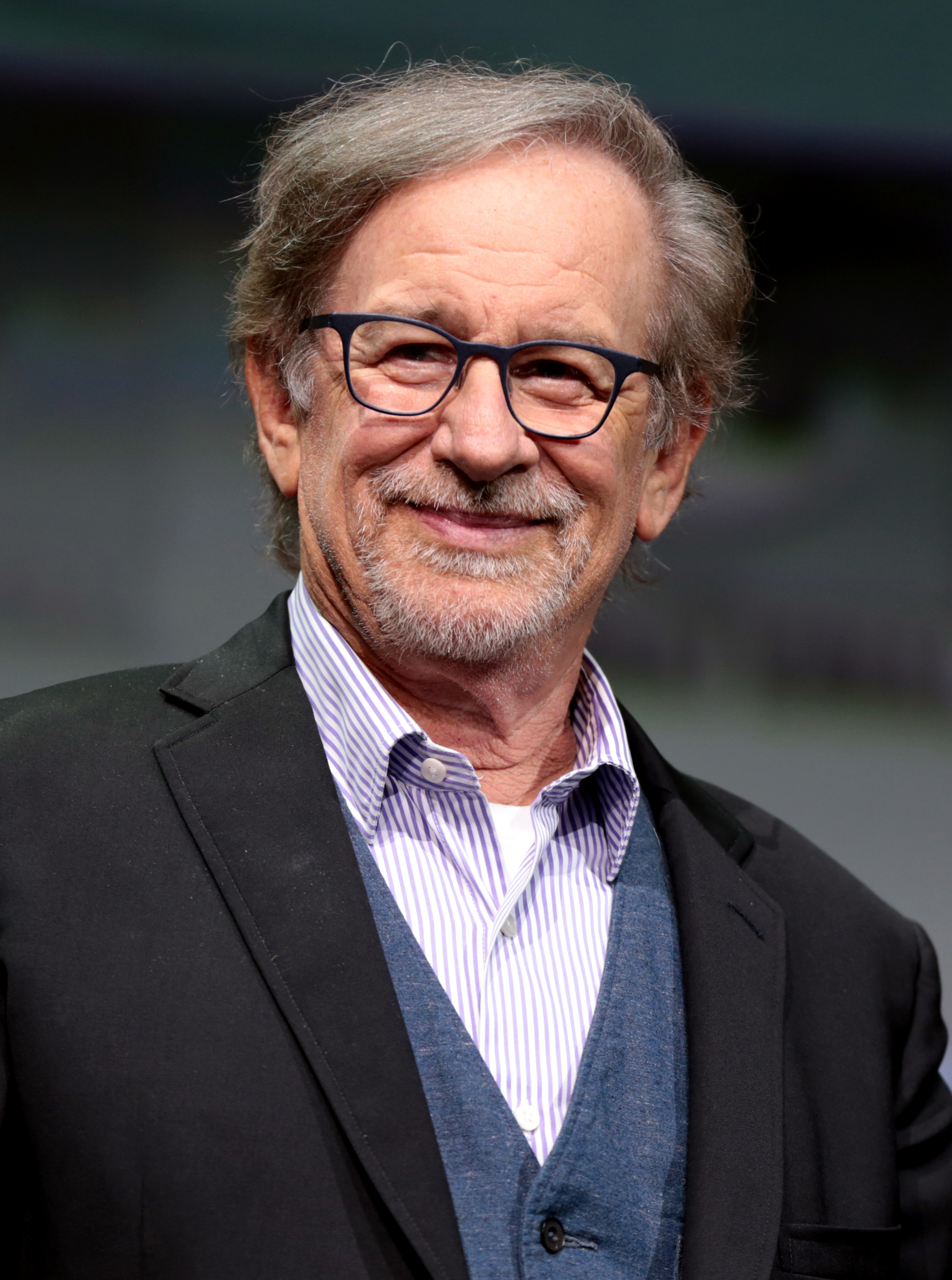
Steven Spielberg, Honorary Golden Bear award winner

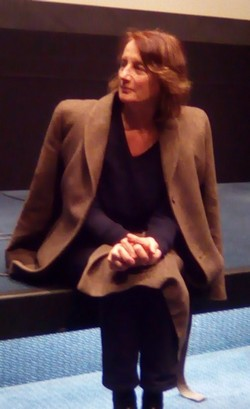
Caroline Champetier, Berlinale Camera award for lifetime achievement award winner

=== Main Competition ===
- Golden Bear: On the Adamant by Nicolas Philibert
- Silver Bear Grand Jury Prize: Afire by Christian Petzold
- Silver Bear Jury Prize: Bad Living by João Canijo
- Silver Bear for Best Director: Philippe Garrel for The Plough
- Silver Bear for Best Leading Performance: Sofía Otero for 20,000 Species of Bees
- Silver Bear for Best Supporting Performance: Thea Ehre for Till the End of the Night
- Silver Bear for Best Screenplay: Angela Schanelec for Music
- Silver Bear for Outstanding Artistic Contribution: Hélène Louvart for Disco Boy (cinematography)

=== Honorary Golden Bear ===
- Steven Spielberg

=== Berlinale Camera ===
- Caroline Champetier

=== Encounters ===
- Best Film: Here by Bas Devos
- Best Director: Tatiana Huezo for The Echo
- Special Jury Award:
  - Orlando, My Political Biography by Paul B. Preciado
  - Samsara by Lois Patiño

=== Berlinale Series Award ===
- The Good Mothers by Elisa Amoruso and Julian Jarrold
  - Jury Special Mention: The Architect (Arkitekten) by Kerren Lumer-Klabbers

=== Short Films Competition ===
- Golden Bear: Les Chenilles by Michelle Keserwany, Noel Keserwany
- Silver Bear: Dipped in Black by Matthew Thorne, Derik Lynch
  - Special Mention: It's a Date by Nadia Parfan

=== Generation ===
==== Youth Jury Awards ====
- Crystal Bear for the Best Film: Adolfo by Sofía Auza
  - Special Mention: And the King Said, What a Fantastic Machine by Axel Danielson and Maximilien Van Aertryck
- Crystal Bear for the Best Short Film: And Me, I'm Dancing Too by Mohammad Valizadegan
  - Special Mention: From the Corner of My Eyes by Domonkos Erhardt

==== Generation 14plus ====
- Grand Prix: Hummingbirds by Silvia Del Carmen Castaños, Estefanía "Beba" Contreras
  - Special Mention: Mutt by Vuk Lungulov-Klotz
- Special Prize for the Best Short Film: Infantry by Laís Santos Araújo
  - Special Mention: Incroci by Francesca de Fusco

==== Children's Jury Generation Kplus ====
- Crystal Bear for the Best Film: Sweet As by Jub Clerc
  - Special Mention: Zeevonk by Domien Huyghe
- Crystal Bear for the Best Short Film: Closing Dynasty by Lloyd Lee Choi
  - Special Mention: Deniska umřela by Philippe Kastner

=== The Perspektive Deutsches Kino Award ===
- Compass-Perspektive-Award: Seven Winters in Tehran by Steffi Niederzoll
- Honorable Mention: The Kidnapping of the Bride by Sophia Mocorrea
- Kompagnon Fellowships:
  - Paraphrase on the Finding of a Glove by Mareike Wegener
  - My Beloved Man's Female Body by Anna Melikova
- Heiner Carow Prize: Bones and Names by Fabian Stumm

=== GWFF Best First Feature Award ===
- The Klezmer Project by Leandro Koch, Paloma Schachmann

=== Documentary Award ===
- The Echo by Tatiana Huezo

=== Panorama Audience Award ===
==== Panorama Audience Award – Feature film ====
- 1st place: Sira by Apolline Traoré
- 2nd place: The Burdened by Amr Gamal
- 3rd place: Midwives by Léa Fehner

==== Panorama Audience Award – Documentary ====
- 1st place: Kokomo City by D. Smith
- 2nd place: The Eternal Memory by Maite Alberdi
- 3rd place: The Cemetery of Cinema by Thierno Souleymane Diallo

== Independent awards ==
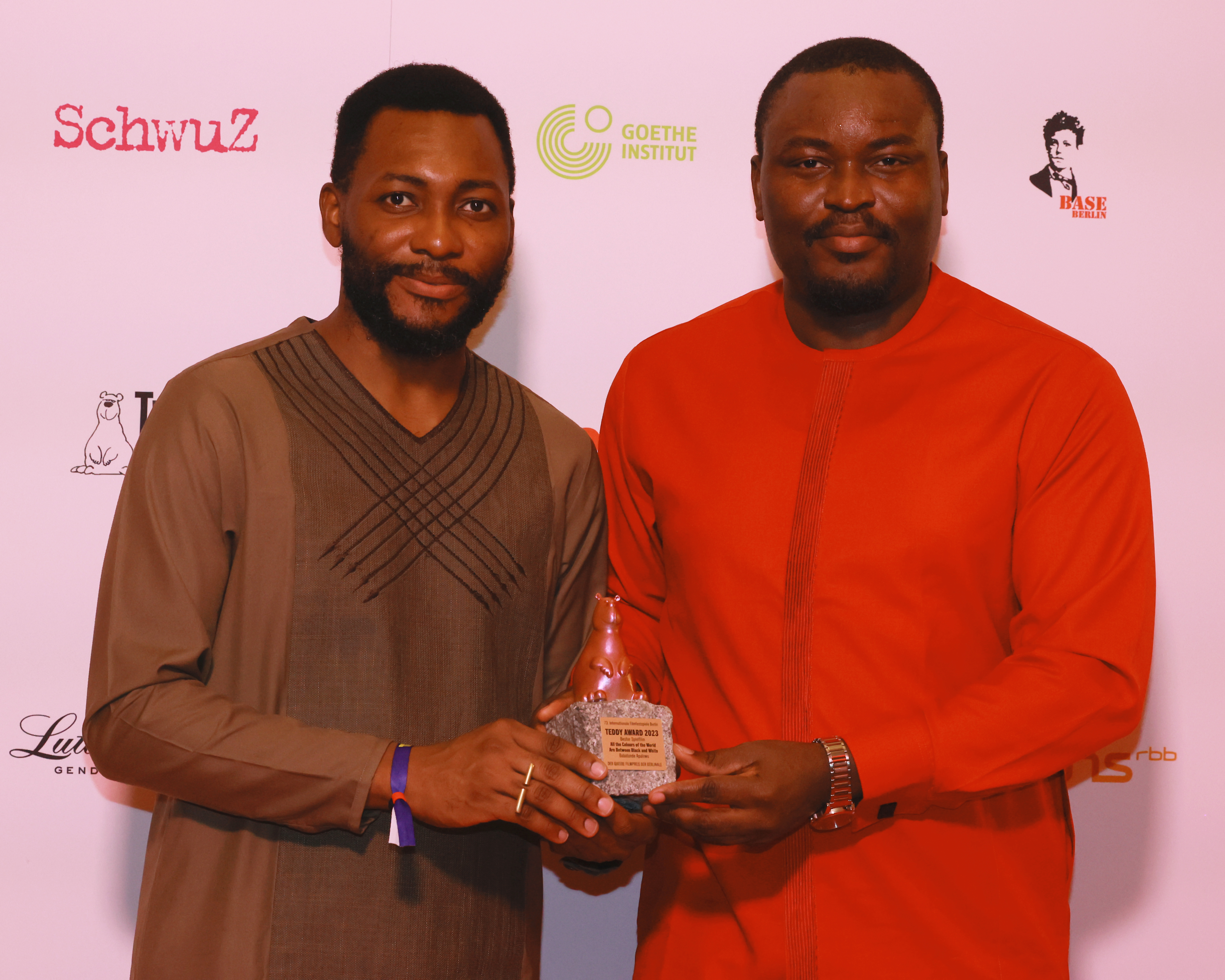
Babatunde Apalowo and Tope Tedela, with the Teddy Award for All the Colours of the World Are Between Black and White

=== Teddy Award ===
- Best Feature Film: All the Colours of the World Are Between Black and White by Babatunde Apalowo
- Best Documentary Film: Orlando, My Political Biography by Paul B. Preciado
- Jury Award: Vicky Knight as Franky for Silver Haze by Sacha Polak
- Best Short Film: Dipped in Black by Matthew Thorne and Derik Lynch

=== Amnesty International Film Award ===
- The Burdened by Amr Gamal

=== Prizes of the Ecumenical Jury ===
- Competition: Tótem by Lila Avilés
- Panorama: Midwives by Léa Fehner
- Forum: Where God Is Not by Mehran Tamadon
  - Special Mention: On the Adamant by Nicolas Philibert

=== Prize of the FIPRESCI ===
- Competition: The Survival of Kindness by Rolf de Heer
- Encounters: Here by Bas Devos
- Panorama: The Quiet Migration by Malene Choi
- Forum: Between Revolutions by Vlad Petri

=== Prize of the Guild of German Art House Cinemas ===
- 20,000 Species of Bees by Estibaliz Urresola Solaguren

=== AG KINO GILDE – CINEMA VISION 14plus ===
- And the King Said, What a Fantastic Machine by Axel Danielson, Maximilien Van Aertryck

=== Cicae Art Cinema Prizes ===
- Panorama: The Teachers' Lounge by İlker Çatak
- Forum: The Face of Jellyfish by Melisa Liebenthal

=== Berliner Morgenpost Reader's Jury Award ===
- 20,000 Species of Bees by Estibaliz Urresola Solaguren

=== Tagesspiegel Reader's Jury Award ===
- Orlando, My Political Biography by Paul B. Preciado

=== Caligari Film Prize ===
- De Facto by Selma Doborac

=== Peace Film Prize ===
- Seven Winters in Tehran by Steffi Niederzoll

=== ARTEKino International Award ===
- Peeled Skin by Leonie Krippendorff
