= Hannah Hoekstra =

Dutch actress (born 1987)

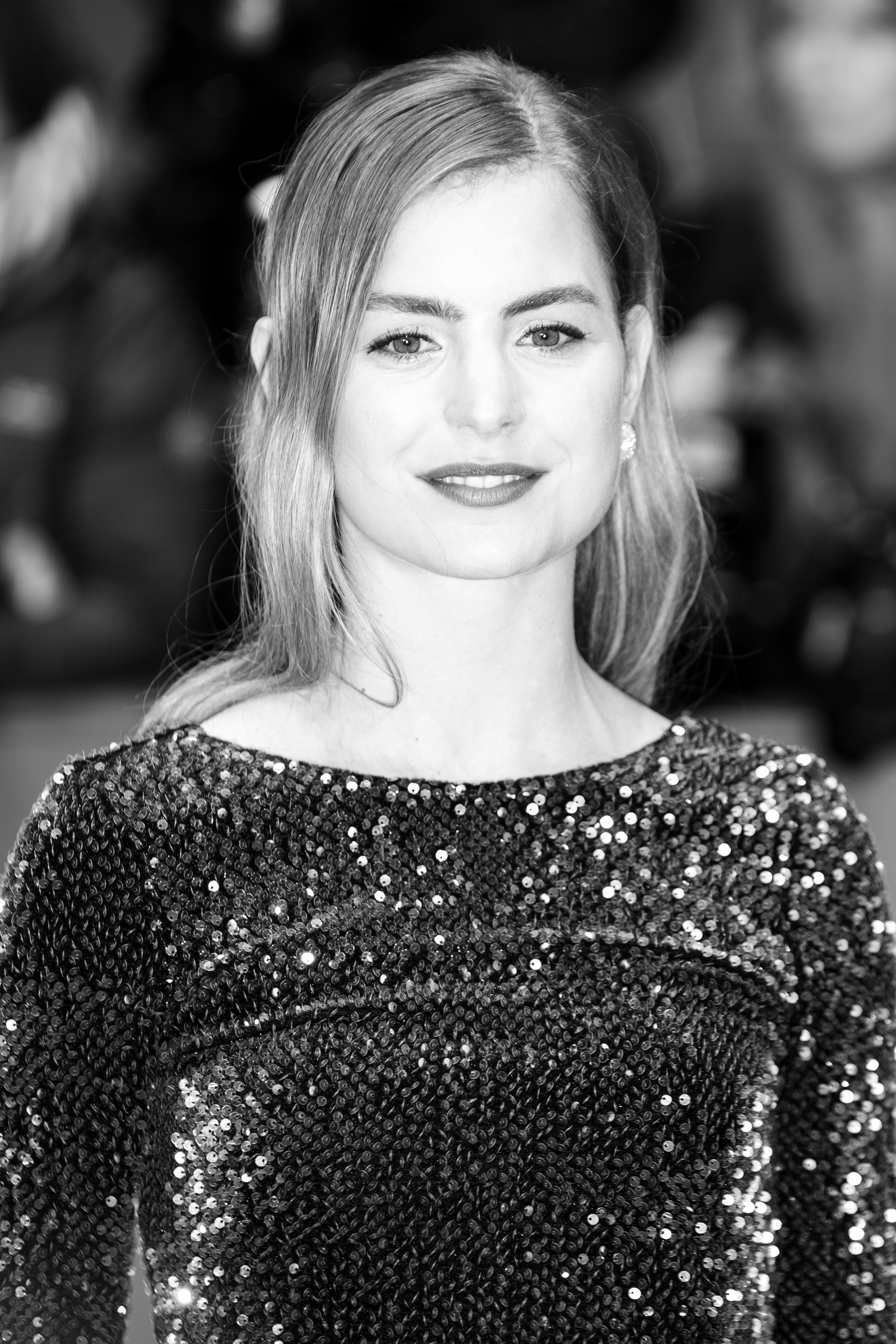
- Hoekstra in 2017
- Born: 2 August 1987 (age 38); Rotterdam, Netherlands
- Occupation: Actress
- Years active: 2011–present
- Awards: Golden Calf; Theo d'Or

Hannah Hoekstra (born 2 August 1987) is a Dutch actress.

== Career ==
In 2010, Hoekstra graduated from the Amsterdam Theater Academy, where she studied from 2006. During training, she participated in the play Underground by director Johan Simons. The following year, she debuted on TV, playing a small role in the TV series Flikken Maastricht.

Her breakthrough came in 2012 when she was cast in Sacha Polak's film Hemel, in which Hoekstra plays a sensual beauty with signs of hypersexuality. The film was shown at the Berlin film festival and received a special prize FIPRESCI. She was also awarded a Golden Calf Award at the Netherlands Film Festival, and was nominated for a Rembrandt Award. She was named a recipient of the Shooting Stars Award which was presented by the European Film Promotion board at the 67th Berlin International Film Festival.

== Selected appearances ==
=== Film ===
Year	Title	Role	Notes
2012	Manslaughter	Judith	Cameo
2012	Mees Kees	Marie Louise	Cameo
2012	Hemel	Hemel	Winner—Golden Calf Award for Best Actress
2013	App	Anna	
2014	The Canal	Alice	
2016	The Fury	Tiny	Winner—Best Actress (Montreal World Film Festival); Winner—Golden Calf Award for Best Actress
2018	Gek Van Oranje	Merel	
2019	Patrick	Nathalie	
2019	Charlie's Angels	Ingrid	
2020	My Father Is an Airplane	Joosje	
2021	Love in a Bottle	Lucky	
2022	Faithfully Yours	Yara Backer	
2023	Cocaine Bear	Elsa	
2024	Schitterend	Nina	
2024	Trip-Tych		

=== Television ===
Year	Title	Role	Notes
2012–2013	Gerede Twijfel	Esmee	
2013	Freddy Heineken	Charlene	4 Episodes
2013	Volgens Robert	Jasmijn	8 Episodes
2017–2018	You Are Wanted	Angel	4 Episodes
2017	Paare		1 Episode
2020	How to Sell Drugs Online Fast	Mia	2 Episodes
2020	Amsterdam Undercover	Femke Pieters	2 Episodes
2020–2021	Edelfigurant	Maaike Michaelson	8 Episodes
2021	De strijd om het Binnenhof	Jacoba van Beieren	1 Episode
2021	Joardy	Hannah Hoekstra (herself)	Season 2
2021	Blackout	Lauren Shannon	3 Episodes
2022	Diepe Gronden	Maxine	4 Episodes
2022	Odds	Kim Benk	10 Episodes
2022	Modern Love Amsterdam	Ada	1 Episode
2024	De Ring	Anna Hartog	10 Episodes

=== Video games ===
- Horizon Zero Dawn (2017) as the model for Aloy and Elisabet Sobeck
- Horizon Forbidden West (2022) as the model for Aloy, Elisabet Sobeck, and Beta
