= Dipped in Black =

2022 Australian docu-fiction film

Marungka tjalatjunu (Dipped in black)
- Yankunytjatjara: Marungka tjalatjunu
- Directed by: Matthew Thorne; Derik Lynch
- Written by: Matthew Thorne; Derik Lynch
- Produced by: Matthew Thorne; Patrick Graham (co-producer)
- Starring: Derik Lynch
- Cinematography: Andrew Gough
- Edited by: Nicola Powell
- Music by: Jed Silver and Derik Lynch
- Production company: Other Pictures
- Release date: 22 February 2023 (Berlinale 2023)
- Running time: 23 minutes
- Country: Australia
- Languages: English; Yankunytjatjara

Marungka tjalatjunu (Dipped in black) is a 2022 Australian hybrid docufiction film, created by Matthew Thorne and Derik Lynch. Through memory, re-creation, and documentary, the film tells the story of Derik's life navigating the whitefella and blackfella worlds.

The film is voiced almost entirely in Yankunytjatjara, an Aboriginal Australian language that is the first language of South Australian artist and performer Derik Lynch. It is the first Australian film to do so.

== Synopsis ==
The film centres on Lynch, a queer Yankunytjatjara theatre artist, as he returns from the white city life of Adelaide, to his hometown of Aputula in the Northern Territory to perform on sacred inma ground.

== Production ==
Marungka Tjalatjunu (Dipped in Black) is co-written and co-directed by Matthew Thorne and artist and performer Derik Lynch. It was produced by Matthew Thorne, of Other Pictures.

The product of a process of ‘ngapartji ngapartji’ (equal sharing) — a Yankunytjatjara phrase literally translated as ‘you give me, I give you’ — the film was built from a framework of shared storytelling, and authorship by Thorne and Lynch. The team describe the work as being made as an import rite of repair on stolen land. Seeing the work as a way to navigate shared authorship, shared storytelling, and the possibility of shared Country — across Australia’s long and complex colonial and multicultural history.

The film was partly funded by the Adelaide Film Festival Investment Fund and the South Australian Film Corporation (SAFC).

A multi-channel video installation work, and photo series made during filming by Thorne & Lynch has been exhibited around the world, including at PHOTO Festival Melbourne (Australia), Lagos Photo Festival (Nigeria), FORMAT Festival, Derby (UK), Chaillot Theatre national de la Danse, Paris (France), and the Hamburg Triennial of Photography (Germany).

== Release ==
The film had its world premiere in competition as part of the Shorts program of the 73rd Berlin International Film Festival in February 2023,

It was then screened at the Sydney Film Festival in June 2023, the Melbourne international Film Festival, and Adelaide Film Festival. The film also opened the Darwin Film Festival that same year. Internationally, it also screened at International Documentary Film Festival Amsterdam, Doc NYC, Montreal International Documentary Festival, and AFI Fest,, with the film being officially selected for over 40 international film festivals around the world.

A special screening was held by the SAFC at the Piccadilly Cinema in North Adelaide in May 2024, at its inaugural Screen Circle event. A Q&A was held afterwards with Lynch and composer Jed Silver, hosted by playwright Verity Laughton. The event is attended by a group of influential screen sector advocates who have promised to support the SAFC in its efforts to develop and expand the film industry in the state. The guests included politicians Kyam Maher, Sarah Hanson-Young, Tammy Franks, as well as filmmakers and industry executives and administrators such as Kate Croser, Kirsty Stark, and Peter Hanlon.

== Accolades ==
Marungka Tjalatjunu (Dipped in Black) won the Silver Bear for Best Short Film and the Teddy Award for best LGBTQ-themed short film at the Berlinale It was the first film to ever have won both awards.

It also won the Documentary Australia Award at the 2023 Sydney Film Festival, and Best Short Documentary at 2023 Melbourne International Film Festival.

In March 2024 it was announced as the winner of the annual SDIN Award, at the 22nd Annual SPA Awards. This award is a joint initiative between the Screen Diversity and Inclusion Network and Screen Producers Australia.

Other awards include Best Short Documentary at the 2024 Australian International Documentary Conference and the 2023 Ruby Award for Outstanding Regional Event or Project..
