= Vicky Knight =

English film actress (born 1996)

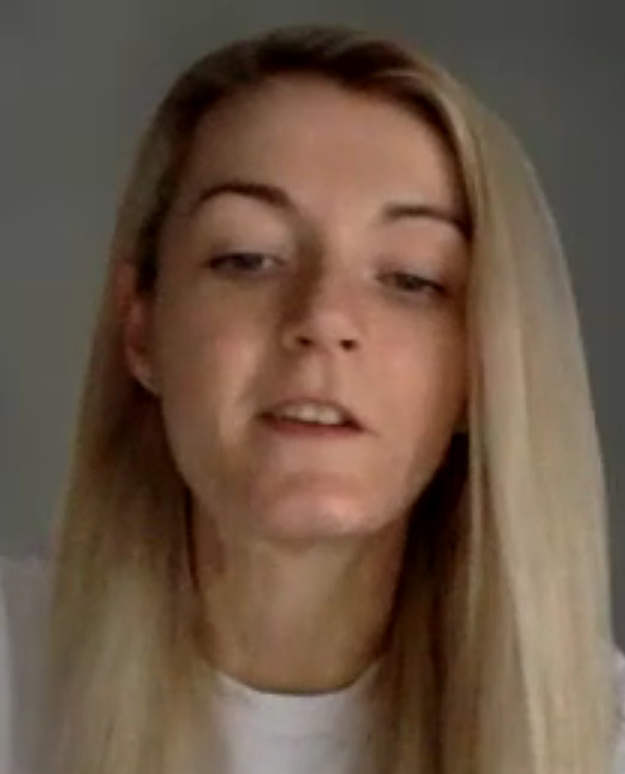
- Knight in 2024
- Born: Vicky Chaundy; 1996; Essex, England
- Occupation: Actor
- Years active: 2014–present
- Notable work: Dirty God

Vicky Knight (also previously known as Vicky Chaundy; born 1996) is an English film actress and hospital healthcare assistant. She has starred in Too Ugly For Love (2014) and Dirty God (2019). Knight debuted as an actress from Sacha Polak's Dirty God, where she played an acid attack victim. Her role in Dirty God was met with critical acclaim.

Knight received burns to 33 per cent of her body from a 2003 fire in her grandfather's pub. Her two cousins died from the fire. She was saved by a local plumber, who later died from the injuries he received. The cause of the fire was arson. She was treated at Broomfield Hospital in Essex, where she now works as a healthcare assistant. If she receives no acting roles in films, Knight will continue to work in the hospital. She started a charity named "Scar Quality" to help others who have experienced burns improve their self-esteem. At her school, Knight participated in a sponsored 28 mi (45 km) walk, where she raised £1,000 for charity. Afterwards, she was named Student of the Year by Association of Colleges.

Her accolades include British Academy Film Awards (BAFTA) for Breakthrough Brits, British Independent Film Awards for Best Performance by an Actress, British Independent Film Awards for Most Promising Newcomer, and Stars of Tomorrow by Screen International.

== 2003 fire ==
On the evening of 27 July 2003, eight-year-old Knight, daughter of Kim Knight, was staying with four cousins in a flat above the Prince of Wales pub in Stoke Newington, London, which had been owned by her grandfather, and was run by her uncle, her mother's brother, Kevin Knight and his wife Kate. After the children had gone to sleep, a fire started in the pub. The cause was arson. Kate Knight, whose two sons aged 4 and 10 died from the fire, was accused of starting the fire after having a dispute with her husband. She was cleared of the charges after a two-week trial at the Old Bailey. Vicky and her female cousin were saved by plumber Ronnie Springer, a regular customer at the pub, who entered the fire to save them. Springer later died from the injuries he received. Kate Knight's third son, Joe, survived the fire but was badly burned. Vicky Knight received burns to 33 per cent of her body and was left severely disfigured. She tried to conceal her scars as she was badly bullied at school and called a "monster". Knight was abused verbally and physically at school; Knight recalled "I got lighters in my face, fags waved around near me. I got beaten up. I’ve been called Freddy Krueger I don't know how many times".

== Career ==
In 2014, Knight appeared in an episode of the British dating television show Too Ugly For Love. She later stated that she was deceived into appearing on the programme as the producers initially told her it would focus on the everyday realities of her life as a burns survivor. Although Knight is gay, she had to pretend to date a straight man for the show. Her appearance on the TV show received mixed reviews from the audience. After the episode went live, Knight was trolled on the internet. When she complained to the production company about the trolling, she was invited to take part in the British matchmaking TV programme The Undateables.

In 2019, she had her debut role, playing the lead in the Dutch film director Sacha Polak's film Dirty God. The plot of the film centres around the character Jade, who is trying to recover from an acid attack. Her role in the film was praised by critics. Tara Brady of The Irish Times wrote, "Knight delivers a terrific performance that is as complex as the sometimes maddening, frequently stupid, and always sympathetic character that she plays." Writing for Variety, Jay Weissberg wrote, "a stand-out performance from newcomer Vicky Knight and an unflinching portrait of a strong-willed yet immature protagonist facing a radical change in how the world looks at her as well as how she sees herself." Playing the role was emotionally difficult for Knight, who said in an interview "I had quite a few breakdowns on set so all the tears that you see are real". Knight stated Dirty God changed her life entirely in helping her to cope with her burn scars. For her performance in the film, she was nominated for the British Independent Film Award for Best Performance by an Actress in a British Independent Film, and Most Promising Newcomer.

The same year she was nominated for the Breakthrough Brits Award by the British Academy Film Awards (BAFTA). She was nominated alongside actor Chance Perdomo and screenwriter Laurie Nunn. After Knight heard she was nominated for Breakthrough Brits she started to "cry" and "screaming". She further added "[Dirty God] It's my first ever film and I thought I already had my dream, honestly. I am going to take every opportunity I can get". She was named "Stars of Tomorrow" by the film magazine Screen International.

== Personal life ==
Knight was previously known as Vicky Chaundy. Knight added she finds it difficult to enter the emotions concerning her scars "[I] Emailed doctors in India and Turkey, asking them to help me". She also revealed she has had suicidal ideation, she said "I was self-harming and self-neglecting. I was a mess, I hit rock bottom. This has given me the opportunity to save my own life. My scars have actually helped me, and something good has come out of something bad".

She attended Robert Clack School, followed by Barking and Dagenham College in London, England, where she studied Health and Social Care. In 2013 Knight was named "Student of the Year" by the Association of Colleges. Knight set up a charity, "Scar Quality", in 2013, to help those who have experienced burns improve their self-esteem. She has participated in a sponsored 28 miles (45 km) walk, raising £1,000 for the charity. After winning the "Student of the Year" title, she said "It's amazing to win, I really can't describe it. My scars are something I have to live with every day, but by setting up the charity I can help others. It was hard work, but it's amazing".

Knight also works as a healthcare assistant at Broomfield Hospital in Essex, England. Her interest in health care began in 2003, when she was being treated in Broomfield Hospital following the pub fire. In the event she receives no more roles in films, she has said she will continue to work as a healthcare assistant. In an interview with the National Health Service (NHS), Knight revealed that she would like to author a book about herself.

== Filmography ==
| Year | Title | Role | Note. | Ref. |
|---|---|---|---|---|
| 2014 | Too Ugly For Love | Herself | | |
| 2019 | Dirty God | Jade | | |
| 2023 | Silver Haze | Franky | | |

== Accolades ==
| Year | Award | Category | Nominated work | Result | Ref. |
|---|---|---|---|---|---|
| 2019 | British Academy Film Awards | BAFTA Breakthrough Brits | – | Won | |
| 2019 | British Independent Film Awards | Best Performance by an Actress in a British Independent Film | Dirty God (2019) | Nominated | |
| 2019 | British Independent Film Awards | Most Promising Newcomer | Dirty God (2019) | Nominated | |
| 2023 | 73rd Berlin International Film Festival | Teddy Award Jury Prize | Silver Haze | Won | |
