= Hemel (film) =

2012 film

- Film poster
- Directed by: Sacha Polak
- Written by: Helena van der Meulen
- Produced by: Stienette Bosklopper; Poto Balbontin; Ilse Ronteltap
- Starring: Hannah Hoekstra; Hans Dagelet; Rifka Lodeizen; Mark Rietman; Eva Duijvestein; Barbara Sarafian
- Cinematography: Daniël Bouquet
- Production company: Circe films
- Release dates: January 29, 2012 (Rotterdam); March 23, 2012 (United States)
- Running time: 80 minutes
- Country: Netherlands
- Language: Dutch

Hemel is a 2012 Dutch film by director Sacha Polak. The film was Polak's feature film debut and premiered at the 62nd Berlin International Film Festival where it was given the FIPRESCI award for best film in the Forum section.

== Plot ==
Hemel (Note: "Hemel" means "Heaven" in Dutch.) (Hannah Hoekstra) is a young Dutch woman, approximately age 25, who frequently has one night stands with strangers. She has a close relationship with her father, Gijs (Hans Dagelet). Joining her father for a dinner party, she witnesses him break up with his girlfriend, Emma, just beforehand—causing an awkward scene at the party.

Hemel talks to her father's girlfriend in the bathroom afterwards by telling her that relationships last as long as they last. The ex-girlfriend accuses Hemel of taking more than she gives.

On a subsequent night, Hemel goes home with a stranger named Jimmy and their sexual encounter turns violent when he strangles and then rapes her. Afterwards, Hemel goes to her ex-stepbrother, Teun's birthday party where she interrogates his Christian girlfriend, Annabella, telling her that it is a waste that she's suppressing her lustful desires and waiting for sex until marriage.

Meanwhile, at the auction house where he works, Gijs gives his girlfriend Sophie, an auctioneer, a ring that says, "You make me human." He invites her along to meet Hemel on her birthday but beforehand tells her that Hemel was an accident and her mother committed suicide. Hemel is openly hostile towards Sophie and possessive of her father's affection. Hemel is surprised to learn that Sophie knows about many of Gijs's former girlfriends. Hemel and her father attend an opera performance. They hold hands briefly at a particularly moving moment, but then separate. They share a cigarette outside the theater.

Hemel has an affair with a married man named Douwe, the husband of one of her father's colleagues, Brechtje, and is surprised to learn that he has had only a few sexual partners. He tells Hemel that she is the only woman he has ever cheated with because he has never felt that betraying the intimacy with his wife was worth it. Hemel is charmed by him but is upset when he tells her their relationship will never last.

Gijs travels to Sevilla, Spain with Hemel for a holiday. They share a bathroom and are seen to be comfortable naked around each other. Gijs tells Hemel that Sophie will be living in his house and she becomes upset. When she asks her father why he loves Sophie he tells her he has nothing to hide from her. Hemel tells him that her version of love involves knowing the same things as the other person. She later tearfully tells him she saw a man commit suicide by jumping off a building. That night, Hemel is sleeping and Gijs wakes her up, carries her to the toilet to urinate, pulling down her underwear for her. The next morning, she peers over the edge of a building herself before leaving.

Back in the Netherlands, Hemel waits outside Douwe's house in the rain. When she spots him leave she knocks on the door to his home where Brechtje answers and tells her that Douwe isn't home. She then tells Hemel about how for the first three years of her life her father brought her to work every day. When Hemel begins to cry, Brechtje dries her tears and the two women hug.

== Production ==
Hannah Hoekstra said she had doubts about accepting the role because of the graphic nude scenes: "Already in the first scene I'm in bed with a man and my pubic hair is shaved off. I really doubted whether I should play this role, whether by doing so I wouldn't be opening the door to a string of nude roles. Guys, we'll ask Hannah Hoekstra, she'll take off her clothes. That I said yes anyway was due to the good script and the fact that both the scriptwriter and the director were women. Hemel is so much about female sexuality, about searching for the limit, about saying no, about intimacy... I would find it almost disgusting for a man to write a script like that."

== Reception ==
The film received positive reviews drawing comparisons to Steve McQueen's film Shame.
