= Silver Haze (film) =

2023 film by Sacha Polak

- Official poster
- Directed by: Sacha Polak
- Screenplay by: Sacha Polak
- Produced by: Marleen Slot; Michael Elliott
- Starring: Vicky Knight; Esmé Creed-Miles; Charlotte Knight; Archie Brigden; Angela Bruce
- Cinematography: Tibor Dingelstad
- Edited by: Lot Rossmark
- Music by: Ella van der Woude; Joris Oonk
- Production companies: Netherlands Film Fund; Netherlands Production Incentive; BBC Film; Viking Film; EMU Films
- Distributed by: BFI Distribution (United Kingdom and Ireland); Cinéart (Netherlands); New Europe Film Sales (Worldwide)
- Release date: 19 February 2023 (Berlinale)
- Running time: 103 minutes
- Countries: United Kingdom; Netherlands
- Language: English

Silver Haze is a 2023 drama film, written and directed by Sacha Polak and starring Vicky Knight, Esmé Creed-Miles, Charlotte Knight, Archie Brigden and Angela Bruce. The film follows 23-year-old Franky, a nurse who, obsessed with a thirst for revenge and a need to assign guilt for a traumatic event that happened 15 years before, is unable to build any meaningful relationship until she falls in love with one of her patients – Florence.

It was nominated to compete for the Panorama Audience Award at the 73rd Berlin International Film Festival, where it had its world premiere on 19 February 2023. The film was also nominated for Best Feature Film Teddy Award, but it won Teddy Award Jury prize.

== Cast ==
- Vicky Knight as Franky
- Esmé Creed-Miles as Florence
- Mason Cook as Mason
- Charlotte Knight as Leah
- Archie Brigden as Jack
- Angela Bruce as Alice
- Alfie Deegan as Flynn
- Sandra Kwiek as Kayley
- Brandon Bendell as Jason
- Carrie Bunyan as Donna
- Sarah-Jane Dent as Jane
- Cain Aiden as Passerby

== Production ==
Sacha Polak participated in the Les Arcs work-in-progress selection in 2021, it was among 15 projects selected for work in progress section out of 164 participants. There the film won a special jury mention in the work-in-progress section.

Vicky Knight was selected as the main lead, the film is partly inspired by Knight's own experiences of having one third of her body burnt in a fire at the age of eight. The film is produced by the Viking Film from Netherlands and EMU Films from United Kingdom. It was shot in 2021 in Dagenham and Southend in the United Kingdom. It completed post-production in 2022.

== Release ==
Silver Haze had its premiere on 19 February 2023, as part of the 73rd Berlin International Film Festival, in Panorama.

It was reported on 9 December 2022, that Poland-based sales agent New Europe Film Sales has acquired the worldwide rights. They have already sold the film to The Jokers for distribution in France and Cineart in Benelux. In June 2023, BFI Distribution acquired distribution rights to the film for the United Kingdom and Ireland.

The film was screened at 2023 BFI London Film Festival in 'Strand' section under 'Love' theme on 6 October 2023.

== Reception ==
On the review aggregator website Rotten Tomatoes, 78% of 32 critics' reviews are positive, with an average rating of 6.8/10. The website's consensus reads: "Silver Haze offers an authentic look at overcoming trauma that lingers like the memory of a first love despite occasionally being overcast by its multi-thematic fog." Metacritic, which uses a weighted average, assigned the film a score of 67 out of 100, based on 5 critics, indicating "generally favorable" reviews. Wendy Ide for ScreenDaily wrote in the review that "the snapshots of various elements of Franky’s [protagonist] life are intensely felt and authentic, but they are not always cohesive, and a rather diffident and wafty score fails to tie the disparate elements together." In concluding, Ide praised Vicky Knight stating, "Knight is a compelling and fiercely persuasive performer."

== Accolades ==
Award	Date	Category	Recipient	Result	Ref.
Berlin International Film Festival	25 February 2023	Panorama Audience Award for Best Feature Film	Silver Haze	Nominated	
Berlin International Film Festival	25 February 2023	Teddy Award for Best Feature Film	Silver Haze	Nominated	
Berlin International Film Festival	25 February 2023	Teddy Award Jury Prize	Vicky Knight	Won	
