= Almamula =

2023 Argentine-French-Italian drama film

- Film poster
- Directed by: Juan Sebastián Torales
- Written by: Juan Sebastián Torales
- Produced by: Augusto Pelliccia; Lorena Quevedo; Edgard Tenembaum
- Starring: Nicolás Díaz; Martina Grimaldi
- Cinematography: Ezequiel Salinas
- Edited by: Juan Sebastián Torales
- Music by: Matteo Locasciulli
- Production companies: Tu Vas Voir Productions; Twins Latin Films; Augustus Color
- Distributed by: Bendita Films
- Release date: 18 February 2023 (Berlin)
- Running time: 94 minutes
- Countries: Argentina; France; Italy
- Language: Spanish

Almamula is a 2023 drama film written and directed by Juan Sebastián Torales. It stars Nicolás Díaz as Nino, a 14-year-old boy who has moved with his family to a small, conservative town in northern Argentina after suffering a violent homophobic attack in their former hometown. The town has recently suffered the disappearance of another young boy in the woods which was attributed to the almamula, a mythological creature in Argentine folklore who supposedly destroys the sexually impure; manipulated by the local church in an attempt to cure him of his homosexuality, Nino himself begins to long for the almamula to come take him away as well. It is a co-production of companies from Argentina, France and Italy.

The cast also includes Martina Grimaldi, María Soldi, Cali Coronel, Luisa Lucía Paz, Beto Frágola, Tania Darchuk and Adrián Ramallo.

The film premiered in the Generation 14plus stream at the 73rd Berlin International Film Festival.

== Production ==
The film was inspired in part by Torales's own childhood experiences growing up as a gay youth in a conservative environment. According to Torales, "when I wrote the script I wanted to reinterpret this legend, dive into the background of it and understand why it was created. Like with many things invented by the Catholic church, the Almamula was created to erase everything they considered immoral or a menace. In the end, ‘Almamula’ doesn't tell the story of the monster that lives in the forest, but the monster that we, as human beings, created around sexuality, and how all that is different sometimes scares us."

In advance of its release, Torales won the Eurimages Development Coproduction Award in the pitch competition at the 2019 San Sebastián International Film Festival. It received a pre-release screening for distributors at the 2022 Ventana Sur film festival in Buenos Aires, where it was winner of the Cine Plus Award.

== Awards ==
At the 2023 Inside Out Film and Video Festival, it was the winner of the juried award for Best First Feature Film.
