= Dirty God =

2019 British film directed by Sacha Polak

- Poster
- Directed by: Sacha Polak
- Written by: Sacha Polak; Susie Farrell
- Produced by: Michael Elliott; Marleen Slot
- Starring: Vicky Knight
- Cinematography: Ruben Impens
- Edited by: Sander Vos
- Music by: Rutger Reinders
- Production companies: Eurimages; BBC Films; Vlaams Audiovisueel Fonds; Screen Ireland; British Film Institute; A Private View; EMU Films; Viking Film
- Distributed by: Dark Star Pictures
- Release date: 23 January 2019
- Running time: 90 minutes
- Countries: United Kingdom; Netherlands; Ireland; Belgium
- Language: English
- Box office: $205,921

Dirty God is a 2019 internationally co-produced drama film, directed and co-written by Sacha Polak. The film marks the English language debut by Polak, and also marks the feature film debut of actress Vicky Knight. Actress Vicky Knight was chosen to play the lead role from auditions of burn survivors. It was selected to be screened in the World Cinema Dramatic Competition section at the 2019 Sundance Film Festival on 26 January 2019. The film also won three Golden Calves for best film, best director (Polak) and best music (Rutger Reinders).

== Plot ==
A young woman, Jade (Vicky Knight), returns home from the hospital after undergoing treatment for severe burns. She is upset to see that her toddler daughter, Rae, is afraid of her due to her severe facial scarring. Jade is supported by her mother and her friends but feels awkward returning to her regular clubbing activities. Disappointed to learn that her healing is as good as it will ever be Jade contacts a surgeon in Morocco to try to undergo facial reconstruction surgery. As her mother will not loan her the money for the surgery she enlists in a dead-end job at a call centre where she befriends Flavia, another single mother. She reveals to Flavia that she was burned by Rae's father who poured acid on her when they broke up.

Jade undergoes a series of setbacks when she learns her mother has been allowing Rae to interact with her paternal grandmother. Jade's mother temporarily kicks Jade out of the house and a video of Jade masturbating is leaked at work. Desperate for the facial reconstruction surgery she steals the necessary money from her mother and leaves for Morocco with her best friend Shami, only to be disappointed when Shami brings along her boyfriend, Naz, with whom Jade had previously had a flirtation. While there Naz and Jade nearly have sex but are stopped by the arrival of Shami. Jade learns that the plastic surgery she paid for is a scam. Later Naz confesses he has real feelings for her but Jade rebuffs him out of respect for Shami. Returning home Jade wins an employee of the month award at work and reconciles with her mother.

== Cast ==
- Vicky Knight as Jade Nugent
- Eliza Brady-Girard as Rae
- Rebecca Stone as Shami
- Dana Marineci as Flavia
- Bluey Robinson as Naz

== Reception ==
=== Critical response ===
On the review aggregator Rotten Tomatoes, the film holds an approval rating of 98% based on 45 reviews, and an average rating of 7.4/10. The website's critical consensus reads, "As powerfully acted as it is sensitively told, Dirty God offers a timely story delivered with empathy and deeply affecting grace."

Cath Clarke of The Guardian wrote, "Dirty God is Dutch director Polak's English-language debut, and it's an authentic portrait of London. Polak shoots with in-the-moment energy: in hospital wards, at a grime club, in a drab call centre where Jade gets a job to pay for surgery." Nikki Baughan of Sight & Sound wrote, "Positively vibrating with barely suppressed pain, rage and injustice, Sacha Polak's Dirty God is both a sharply observed character study and a damning indictment of our skin-deep Instagram culture." Hanna Flint of the Time Out wrote, "Polak follows in the footsteps of directors Andrea Arnold (Fish Tank) and Benh Zeitlin (Beasts of the Southern Wild) by drawing out a brilliantly nuanced performance from first-time-actor Knight, a burn victim herself." Jay Weissberg of the Variety wrote, "Much attention will deservedly be paid to Knight's impressively nuanced performance – it's one thing to cast an amateur who's been through similar experiences, and quite another to get that person to inhabit a fictional character. Vulnerable, flinty, and unashamedly sexual, Knight's Jade may not be an especially likable person, but she's vibrantly real, and the newcomer brings a forceful physicality and, in her scenes with Robinson, a palpable sensuality." Sophie Monks Kaufman of the Empire wrote, "An intimate portrait of a restless young woman seeking mind, body and soul comfort. Newcomer Vicky Knight is magnetic and there are flashes of kinetic brilliance despite sketchy stretches."

Eric D. Snider of the CrookedMarquee criticised the film for having a thin plot and being hard to watch. And he further added "It's not quite gratuitous misery porn — it's ultimately more hopeful than that — but it's adjacent to it. Director Sacha Polak, co-writing with Susie Farrell, focuses on Jade's valiant and not-so-valiant efforts to rebuild her life and not let her injuries destroy her, but it's hard not to get bogged down in the sadness of every damn detail.", and "Knight's naturalistic performance notwithstanding, it's a hard movie to watch, and the rewards aren't sufficient. The plot is thin, and these aren't the sort of characters you want to just hang out with."

== Awards ==
The film received four nominations at the 2019 British Independent Film Awards. Vicky Knight was nominated as both Best Actress and Most Promising Newcomer. Bluey Robinson was nominated as Best Supporting Actor. Morten Jacobsen, Rogier Samuels, Lindelotte Van Der Meer were nominated for Best Make Up & Hair Design.
