= Elaha =

- Directed by: Milena Aboyan
- Written by: Milena Aboyan; Constantin Hatz
- Produced by: Kinescope Film GmbH
- Starring: Bayan Layla; Derya Durmaz; Nazmi Kirik; Armin Wahedi
- Distributed by: Camino Filmverleih
- Release date: 17 February 2023 (BIFF)
- Running time: 109 minutes
- Country: Germany
- Languages: German, Kurdish

Elaha is a 2023 German drama film directed by Milena Aboyan in her feature-length debut. The film stars Bayan Layla as a young Kurdish-German woman confronting cultural expectations and personal freedom in the lead-up to her arranged marriage. Elaha premiered at the 73rd Berlin International Film Festival in the Perspektive Deutsches Kino section.

== Plot ==
Elaha, a 22-year-old Kurdish-German woman, is preparing for her wedding. In her conservative community, a bride’s virginity is considered essential. Elaha, however, is no longer a virgin and wrestles with the pressure to undergo a hymen reconstruction surgery. Unable to afford the procedure, she questions why such expectations exist and whether she should conform to them. The film follows her struggle between family traditions, societal norms, and her desire for autonomy.

== Cast ==
- Bayan Layla as Elaha
- Derya Durmaz as Elaha’s mother
- Nazmi Kirik as Elaha’s father
- Armin Wahedi as Yeganeh Nasim
- Cansu Leyan as Berivan
- Derya Dilber as Shilan
- Réber Ibrahim as Sami
- Hadnet Tesfai as Stella Zahaye
- Dennenesch Zoudé as Dr. Abay

== Production ==
Elaha marks the feature debut of director and screenwriter Milena Aboyan. The film was produced by Kinescope Film GmbH and distributed in Germany by Camino Filmverleih.

== Release ==
The film had its world premiere at the 73rd Berlinale in February 2023, screening in the Perspektive Deutsches Kino programme. It was later broadcast on ARTE in December 2025.

== Reception ==
Critics praised the film for its sensitive portrayal of cultural and gender expectations. Kino-Zeit highlighted its “courage and complexity” in depicting the protagonist’s dilemma. Reviewers also commended Bayan Layla’s performance as “outstanding”.
