= Battle of the Sacred Tree =

1995 Kenyan film

- Directed by: Wanjiru Kinyanjui
- Written by: Wanjiru Kinyanjui Barbara Kimenye
- Story by: Wanjiru Kinyanjui
- Produced by: Wanjiru Kinyanjui
- Starring: Margaret Nyacheo; Catherine Kariuki; Roslynn Kimani; Titi Wainaina
- Cinematography: François Kotlarski
- Edited by: Eva López Echegoyen
- Music by: Mamadou Mbaye
- Production companies: Birne-Film; Deutsche Film- und Fernsehakademie Berlin (DFFB)
- Release date: 1995
- Running time: 82 min
- Country: Kenya
- Languages: English; Kikuyu

Battle of the Sacred Tree, is a 1995 Kenyan film written and directed by Wanjiru Kinyanjui. In a Kikuyu hamlet, traditional African beliefs clash with missionary fervor. There, a sacred tree that has an odd influence on everyone in its vicinity is the center of life. The tree is obviously merely a reminder of a pagan past to Christian women. Mumbi, the daughter of a traditional medicine man who has returned from the city with an abusive husband, is opposing their decision to cut down the tree. She captured "the most dramatic occasion of the Feeling of the Sacred Tree" in Polaroid pictures that brought the community together in therapeutic delight.

== Plot ==
The film gives us insight into how people of a society would still want to remain worshiping idols or lesser gods than being converted into Christians. Wambui takes her daughter back to her hometown village in ordepe her abusive and unfaithful husband. There, Christian women's organization has launched war on Mzee's herbal medicine and the Happy Bar, where Wambui gets employment, among other things. But t sacrehe tree continues to be the main source of conflict. Kinya i tacnjuis the tension between African culture and modernity with a great deal of humor and irony.

== Cast ==
- Margaret Nyacheo as Mumbi
- Catherine Kariuki
- Roslynn Kimani
- Titi Wainaina
