= Wanjiru Kinyanjui =

Kenyan writer, poet, journalist and filmmaker

- Born: 1958 (age 67–68)
- Citizenship: Kenyan
- Occupations: Writer, poet, journalist and filmmaker.
- Notable work: Battle of the Sacred Tree

Wanjirū Kìnyanjui (born 1958) is a Kenyan writer, poet, journalist, and filmmaker.

== Life ==
Kinyanjui received a master's in English and German literature before studying film at the German Film and Television Academy Berlin.

Kinyanjui's 1994 film Battle of the Sacred Tree, focusing on a woman caught between traditional Kikuyu values and 'modern' practices, was financially supported, produced and distributed by Birne Film (Germany) and Flamingo Films (France). This film, shot in Kenya, as well as Kinyanjui's short film A Lover & Killer of Colours were part of the Forum Special Program at the 2023 Berlinale.

== Filmography ==
Year	Project	Role	Notes	Ref
1987	...If Joined by a Stranger [...Wenn nein Fremder dazu kommt]	Director	Short film	
1988	The Reunion	Writer, Director	Short film	
1988	A Lover and Killer of Colour	Director	Short film	
1990	Karfunkel – Der Vogel mit dem gebrochenen Flügel	Director	TV Series	
1991	The Sick Bird	Writer, Director	Short film	
1992	Black in the Western World	Director	Documentary	
1992	Clara Has Two Countries	Director		
1993	Vitico, a Living Legend	Director	Documentary	
1994	Battle of the Sacred Tree (Der Kampf um den heiligen Baum)	Writer, Director	Comedy	
1997	Die Rechte der Kinder – Der aufgespürte Vater	Director	Short film	
1997	Koi and Her Rights [Koi na Haki Zake]	Director	Educational Drama	
1997	Daudi’s Gift [Zawaki ya Daudi]	Director	Educational Drama	
1998	Die Rechte der Kinder – Anruf aus Afrika	Director	Documentary	
1999	African Children	Writer, Director	Documentary	
2000	And This Is Progress	Writer, Director	Documentary/Advocacy Film	
2001	Say No to Poverty	Writer, Director	Documentary	
2001	Member of the Jury	Writer, Director	Educational Drama	
2007	Manga in America	Writer, Director	Riverwood film	
2008	Bahati	Writer, Director	Riverwood film	
2010	Africa Is a Woman's Name – Amai Rose: A Portrait of a Zimbabwean Woman	Director	Documentary	
