= Sacha Polak =

Dutch film director

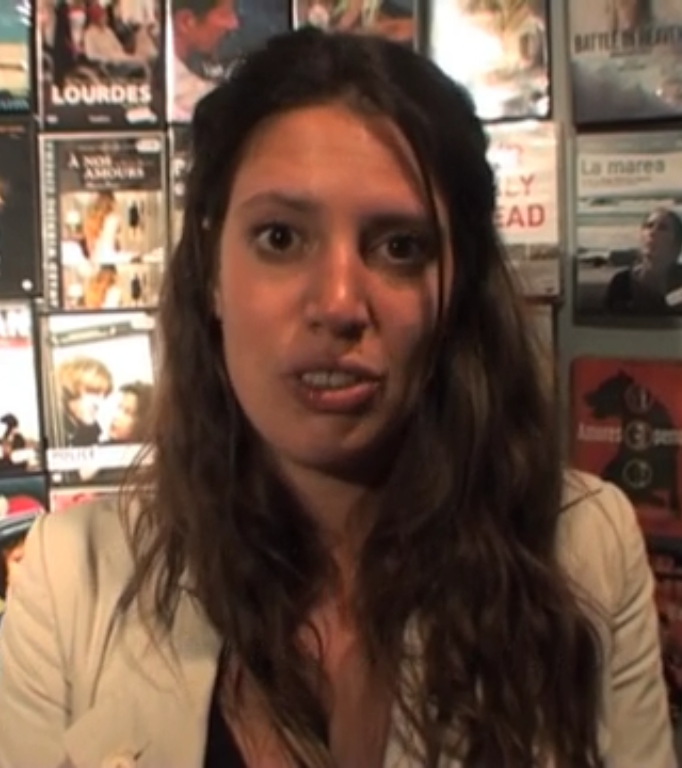
Sacha Polak in 2011

Sacha Polak (born 1982) is a Dutch film director.

== Career ==
In 2012 Polak's feature film debut Hemel played at the 62nd Berlin International Film Festival. This film, translated into Russian by Andrey Efremov, was shown in 2014 in the Russian city of Vologda as part of the VOICES Young Cinema Festival. Additionally her short Brother and her step-mother Meral Uslu's film on which she was a script supervisor, all played at the festival as well.

In 2014 Polak was initially going to direct the film Vita & Virginia about the love-affair between Virginia Woolf and Vita Sackville-West but was she replaced by Chanya Button.

In 2015 Polak's second film Zurich played at the 65th Berlin International Film Festival.

Polak's next feature film was the movie Dirty God about a woman who sustained facial burns after an acid attack by her ex-partner. This film won her the Golden Calf award for best direction at the 2019 Netherlands Film Festival. The lead actress in the film, Vicky Knight, won a BAFTA Breakthrough Brits award for new talent at the 2019 British Academy of Film and Television Arts awards.

== Personal life ==
Polak's mother died of breast cancer 11 months after she was born.

Director Meral Uslu is her step-mother.

== Filmography ==
- Hemel (2012)
- Zurich (2015)
- Dirty God (2019)
- Hanna (2019-2021)
- Silver Haze (2023)
