= List of Mexican films of 2024 =

This is a list of Mexican films released in 2024.

English title	Original title	Director	Cast	Genre	Notes
Bad Actor	Un actor malo	Jorge Cuchí	Alfonso Dosal, Fiona Palomo	Drama	Premiered on April 4 in Mexican theatres
Canta y no llores		Félix Sabroso	Consuelo Duval, Michelle Rodríguez, Patricia Maqueo, Francisco Rueda, Lumi Lizardo, Luis del Valle, Ana Maria Arias, Victor Gómez	Comedy	Premiered on March 21 in Mexican theaters
La cocina		Alonso Ruizpalacios	Raúl Briones Carmona, Rooney Mara, Anna Diaz, Motell Foster, Oded Fehr, Eduardo Olmos, Spenser Granese, Laura Gómez, James Waterston	Drama	Premiered on November 7 in Mexican theaters
Concerto for Other Hands	Concierto para otras manos	Ernesto González Díaz	David González Ladrón de Guevara, José Luis González Moya	Documentary	Nominated - Hecho en Jalisco - Best Film at the 39th Guadalajara International Film Festival Winner - Best Documentary Feature at the 12th Gran Fiesta de Cine Mexicano Nominated - Zanate Grand Prize at the 17th Zanate Mexican Documentary Film Festival Winner - Zanate Audience Award at the 17th Zanate Mexican Documentary Film Festival Winner - Best Editing at the Film Festival Cine al Margen Nominated - Best Mexican Documentary Feature at the 7th MICMX International Film Festival Winner - Best Documentary at the 50th Diosas de Plata
Corina		Urzula Barba	Naian González Norvind, Cristo Fernández, Ariana Candela, Carolina Politi, Maite Urrutia, Mariana Giménez, Mónica Bejarano, Elena Gore, Alejandro Mendicuti, Ruth Ramos, Laura de Ita, Myrna Moguel, Christopher Cardenas, Azucena Evans, Gerardo Trejoluna	Comedy-drama	Nominated - Mezcal Award at the 39th Guadalajara International Film Festival Winner - Hecho en Jalisco for Best Film at the 39th Guadalajara International Film Festival Winner - Press Award at the 27th Guanajuato International Film Festival Nominated - Best First Feature Film Award at the 28th Tallinn Black Nights Film Festival Winner - Best Film, Best Fiction Director, Best Actress in a Feature Film for Naian Gonzalez Norvind & Best Screenplay at the 12th Gran Fiesta Del Cine Mexicano Winner - Global Section - Audience Award at the South by Southwest Film & TV Festival Nominated - Jordan Ressler First Feature Award at the 42nd Miami Film Festival Winner - Audience Choice Award at the 27th Shanghai International Film Festival The film was commercially released on January 9, 2025, in Mexican theaters
Dead Man's Switch	Arillo de hombre muerto	Alejandro Gerber Bicecci	Adriana Paz, Noé Hernández, Gina Morett, Gabo Anguiano, Andrea Jimenez Camacho, Mariel Molino, Ramón Medína, Ángel Abad, Antonio Alcantara, Andalucía, Zuadd Atala, Baltimore Beltran, Marcelo Cerón, Pilar Couto, Rubén Cristiany, Alejandro De la Rosa, Surya MacGregor, Miguel Ángel López, Desiderio Däxuni, Tomihuatzi Xelhuantzi, Kimberly Escajadillo, Alejandro Guerrero, Alberto Lomnitz, Roberto Mares, Aldo Escalante Ochoa, Norma Pablo, Evan Regueira, Boris Schoemann, Juan Carlos Terreros	Melodrama	Nominated - Mezcal Award - Best Film at the 39th Guadalajara International Film Festival Nominated - Mexico Today - Best Full Feature Films at the 16th Hola Mexico Film Festival It was commercially released on March 20, 2025, in Mexican theaters
The Dog Thief	El ladrón de perros	Vinko Tomičić	Franklin Aro, Alfredo Castro, María Luque, Julio César Altamirano, Ninon Davalos, Teresa Ruiz, Kleber Aro Huasco, Vladimir Gonza Mamani, Jhoselyn Rosmery Cosme, Wolframio Sinué, Felix Francisco Omonte Vargas, Iván Cori Mamani, Raúl Montecinos Heredia	Drama	Nominated - Best International Narrative Feature at the 23rd Tribeca Film Festival Nominated - Best Ibero-American Fiction Feature Film at the Winner - New Actor - Special Mention for Franklin Aro at the 39th Guadalajara International Film Festival Nominated - CineVision Award at the 41st Filmfest München Nominated - Best Picture at the 28th Lima Film Festival Winner - Special Jury Prize at the 28th Lima Film Festival Nominated - Best Film in the International Competition at the 20th Santiago International Film Festival Nominated - Best Performance for Franklin Aro in the International Competition at the 20th Santiago International Film Festival Nominated - Best International Feature Film at the 61st Antalya Golden Orange Film Festival Winner - Best Director in the International Competition & Best Actor for Franklin Aro at the 61st Antalya Golden Orange Film Festival Nominated - Latin-American Competition - Best Film at the 39th Mar del Plata International Film Festival Nominated - Best Fiction Feature Film at the 45th Havana Film Festival Winner - Best Screenplay at the 45th Havana Film Festival Nominated - Best Latin-American Film at the 30th Forqué Awards Winner - Best Latin-American Film at the 28th Málaga Film Festival Nominated - MARIMBAS Award at the Miami Film Festival Winner - Best Ibero-American Debut Film at the 12th Platino Awards Nominated - Film and Values Education at the 12th Platino Awards Nominated - Best Ibero-American Film at the 67th Ariel Awards An international co-production with Bolivia, Ecuador, Chile, France and Italy
La familia del barrio: La película		Rhajov Villafuerte	Sergio Lebrija	Comedy, Science fiction	Premiered on June 27 on Vix+
Fine Young Men	Hombres íntegros	Alejandro Andrade	Andrés Revo, Joaquín Emanuel, María Aura, Tomás Rojas, Mai Elissalt, Emilio Puente, Moisés Arizmendi, Héctor Kuri Hernández, Isaac Cherem, Norma Pablo, Verónica Toussaint, Concepción Márquez	Drama, Thriller	In co-production with Spain and France Nominated - Best Mexican Feature Film at the 22nd Morelia International Film Festival Winner - Best Actor for Andrés Revo at the 22nd Morelia International Film Festival Winner - Best Actor for Andrés Revo & Best Screenplay at the 9th Tequila International Film Festival Winner - Best Film at the 12th Muestra Intergaláctica Winner - Best Mexican Fiction Feature Film & Special Sponsor Prize at the 6th MICMXIFF International Film Festival
A History of Love and War	Una historia de amor y guerra	Santiago Mohar Volkow	Andrew Leland Rogers, Lucía Gómez-Robledo, Patricia Bernal, Hernan Del Riego, Santiago Espejo, Manuel Garcia-Rulfo, Sophie Gómez, Maria Hinojos, Florencia Ríos, Dario Yazbek Bernal, Fernando Álvarez Rebeil, Mónica del Carmen, José Carlos Illanes, Sharon Kleinberg, Sara Montalvo, Aldo Escalante, Teresa Sanchez	Comedy, Satire	Winner - German Independence Award – Spirit of Cinema at the 31st Oldenburg International Film Festival Nominated - Best Film - International Competition at the 39th Mar del Plata International Film Festival
In the Summers		Alessandra Lacorazza Samudio	René Pérez, Sasha Calle, Lío Mehiel, Emma Ramos, Leslie Grace, Sharlene Cruz	Drama	Winner - Grand Jury Prize U.S. Dramatic at the 2024 Sundance Film Festival
Lázaro at Night	Lázaro de noche	Nicolás Pereda	Lázaro G. Rodríguez, Luisa Pardo, Francisco Barreiro, Teresita Sánchez, Gabriel Nuncio, Clarissa Malheiros	Docufiction	Canadian-Mexican coproduction
The Muleteer	La arriera	Isabel Cristina Fregoso	Andrea Aldama, Ale Cosío, Luis Vegas, Baltimore Beltrán, Sasha González, Christian Ramos, Mayra Batalla, Pascacio López, Waldo Facco	Adventure, Coming-of-age, Drama	Nominated - Mezcal Award - Best Film, Maguey Award & Hecho en Jalisco Award at the 39th Guadalajara International Film Festival Winner - Best Directing & Best Cinematography at the 39th Guadalajara International Film Festival Nominated - Best Mexican Fiction Feature Film at the 27th Guanajuato International Film Festival
Non Negotiable	No Negociable	Juan Taratuto	Mauricio Ochmann, Leonardo Ortizgris, Tato Alexander, Enoc Leaño, Claudette Maillé, Cristina Michaus, Gonzalo Vega Jr., Fernanda Borches, Itza Sodi	Action, Comedy, Thriller	Premiered on July 26 on Netflix
Párvulos: Children of the Apocalypse	Párvulos: Hijos del apocalipsis	Isaac Ezban	Farid Escalante, Mateo Ortega, Leonardo Cervantes, Carla Adell, Norma Flores, Noé Hernández, Omar Karim, Horacio F. Lazo, Efrain Rosas Léono, Tito Onofre Andrade Racenis, Juan Carlos Remolina, Marco Rodríguez, Emilio Galvan, Jason Luis Rodríguez	Horror, Post-apocalyptic	Nominated - Cheval Noir - Best Film at the 28th Fantasia International Film Festival Premiered on November 7
Pedro Páramo		Rodrigo Prieto	Manuel Garcia-Rulfo, Tenoch Huerta, Ilse Salas, Mayra Batalla, Héctor Kotsifakis, Roberto Sosa, Dolores Heredia, Giovanna Zacarías, Noé Hernández, Yoshira Escárrega	Drama, Magic realism	Launch at the 2024 Toronto International Film Festival Mexican limited release at Cine Tonalá on September 12–19 Debut on Netflix on November 6
The Perfect Club	El club perfecto	Ricardo Castro Velazquez	Ana Layevska, Alfonso Borbolla, Liz Gallardo, Hernán del Riego, Aldo Escalante, Xavier García, Rodrigo Munguía, Gabriel Fritsch, Daniela Martínez, Andrea Tova, Diego Peniche, Miguel Orlando, Dei Saldaña, Jorge Reyes, Regina Carrillo, Gabriel Ulloa, Selene Gottdiner	Comedy, Heist	Winner - Comedy Vanguard Feature at the 31st Austin Film Festival Nominated - Best Mexican Fiction Feature Film at the 28th Guanajuato International Film Festival
El roomie		Pedro Pablo Ibarra	Fiona Palomo, José Eduardo Derbez, Giuseppe Gamba, Leticia Calderón, Édgar Vivar, Carlos Ferro, Irving López, Herlnally Rodríguez, Uriel del Toro, Augusto Di Paolo, Natalia Payan, Naia Pindas Sandoval, Victoria Ruffo, Bárbara de Regil, Ariadne Díaz, Marcus Ornellas, Maite Perroni, Isidora Vives, Paloma Woolrich	Romantic comedy	Premiered on January 18 in Mexican theaters
Sujo		Astrid Rondero & Fernanda Valadez	Juan Jesús Varela	Drama	Winner - World Cinema Dramatic Grand Jury Prize at the 2024 Sundance Film Festival
Technoboys		Gerardo Gatica & Luis Gerardo Méndez	Luis Gerardo Méndez, Bernardo De Paula, Karla Souza, Gabriel Nuncio, Daniela Vega, Fernando Bonilla, Demetrio Bonilla, Joaquín Ferreira, Luis Rodríguez "El Guana", Ari Brickman, Vin Ramos, Germán Bracco, Mónica del Carmen, Fernanda Castillo, Paola Fernandez	Comedy, Musical, Satire	Premiered on September 5 in Mexican theaters Released worldwide on September 11 on Netflix
We Shall Not Be Moved	No nos moverán	Pierre Saint-Martin	Luisa Huertas, Rebeca Manríquez, José Alberto Patiño, Pedro Hernández, Agustina Quinci, Juan Carlos Colombo, Gabriela Aguirre, Alberto Trujillo	Black comedy, Comedy-drama, Satire	Winner - Student Fiction Award, CCAS Fiction Award & SFCC Critics' Award at the 36th Toulouse Cinelatino Film Festival Winner - Mezcal Award - Best Film & Audience Award at the 39th Guadalajara International Film Festival Nominated - Best International Film at the 48th São Paulo International Film Festival Nominated - Colón de Oro at the 50th Huelva Ibero-American Film Festival Winner - Best Performance for Luisa Huertas & Casa de Iberoamérica Award at the 50th Huelva Ibero-American Film Festival

== Box office ==
The ten most watched Mexican films in 2024, by in-year admissions, were as follows:

Most watched films of 2024
Rank	Title	Admissions	Gross (USD)
1	El candidato honesto	1,656,091	5,260,012
2	El roomie	1,273,740	4,682,267
3	Noche de bodas	661,441	2,746,806
4	Jugaremos en el bosque	642,227	2,322,426
5	Casi el paraíso	628,701	2,274,478
6	Turno nocturno	610,513	2,032,974
7	Todas menos tú	594,617	2,275,826
8	Una pequeña confusión	499,389	2,066,723
9	María, ¡Me muero!	286,539	884,291
10	Bad Actor (Un actor malo)	218,672	900,822

== See also ==
- 67th Ariel Awards
- List of 2024 box office number-one films in Mexico
