= 67th Ariel Awards =

2025 Mexican film awards

- Date: 20 September 2025
- Site: Puerto Vallarta, Jalisco, Mexico
- Hosted by: Karla Souza

Highlights
- Best Picture: Sujo
- Most awards: Pedro Páramo (8)
- Most nominations: Pedro Páramo (17)

Television coverage
- Network: HBO Max

The 67th Ariel Awards ceremony, presented by the Mexican Academy of Cinematographic Arts and Sciences (AMACC), took place in Puerto Vallarta, Jalisco, on 20 September 2025. Sujo won the award for Best Picture and Best Direction, while Pedro Páramo took most of the technical prizes. Actors Raúl Briones and Luisa Huertas won the acting awards for the films La cocina and We Shall Not Be Moved, respectively.

The Golden Ariel was given to actors Patricia Reyes Spíndola and Jacqueline Andere for their careers, and to the Cinematographic Production Workers' Union (Sindicato de Trabajadores de la Producción Cinematográfica) in conmemoration for their 80th anniversary.

== Nominees ==
An early set of nominations was read at Cineteca Nacional on 2 July 2025 in a ceremony hosted by Mónica Huarte and Ana Sofía Gatica.

On 9 July 2025 the AMACC announced the expansion of the nominations tally due to "concerns expressed by various groups in the film community" regarding the limit of three nominations in some categories. In an effort to "honor what is literally established in the Election Committee's regulations and to strengthen the inclusion and diversity of these awards," the academy included the most voted nominees to complete each category with five nominations, six in the event of a tie.

The final set of nominees and winners is listed as follows:

Best Picture: Sujo; Bad Actor; La cocina; Pedro Páramo; We Shall Not Be Moved	Best Director: Astrid Rondero, Fernanda Valadez — Sujo; Urzula Barba Hopfner — Corina; Rodrigo Prieto — Pedro Páramo; Alonso Ruizpalacios — La cocina; Pierre Saint Martin — We Shall Not Be Moved
Best Actor: Raúl Briones — La cocina; Alfonso Dosal — Bad Actor; Manuel García Rulfo — Pedro Páramo; Juan Ramón López — Shame; Juan Jesús Varela — Sujo	Best Actress: Luisa Huertas — We Shall Not Be Moved; Naian González Norvind — Corina; Rooney Mara — La cocina; Fiona Palomo — Bad Actor; Adriana Paz — Dead Man's Switch
Best Supporting Actress: Yadira Pérez Esteban — Sujo; Mayra Batalla — Pedro Páramo; Laura de Ita — Corina; Carolina Politi — Corina; Agustina Quinci — We Shall Not Be Moved; Giovana Zacarías — Pedro Páramo	Best Supporting Actor: Héctor Kotsifakis — Pedro Páramo; Juan Carlos Colombo — We Shall Not Be Moved; Noé Hernández — Dead Man's Switch; Eduardo Olmos — La cocina; Alexis Varela — Sujo
Best Breakthrough Performance: José Alberto Patiño — We Shall Not Be Moved; Ale Cosío — The Muleteer; Jairo Hernández — Sujo; Sofía Quezada — Sharp Wounds; Andrés Revo — Fine Young Men; Miguel Valverde — Down the Rabbit Hole	Best Cinematography: Rodrigo Prieto, Nicolás Aguilar — Pedro Páramo; Ximena Amann — Sujo; César Gutiérrez Miranda — We Shall Not Be Moved; Juan Pablo Ramírez — La cocina; María Sarasvati Herrera — The Muleteer
Best Original Screenplay: Pierre Saint Martin, Iker Compean Leroux — We Shall Not Be Moved; Alejandro Andrade Pease, Armando López Muñoz — Fine Young Men; Jorge Cuchí — Bad Actor; Astrid Rondero, Fernanda Valadez — Sujo; Samuel Sosa Derat, Urzula Barba Hopfner — Corina	Best Adapted Screenplay: Alonso Ruizpalacios — La cocina; Nicolás Giacobone — Down the Rabbit Hole; Mateo Gil — Pedro Páramo; Edgar San Juan, Juan Curi, Hipatia Argüero — Quite Like Paradise; Javier Van de Couter, Camila Sosa Villanda, Laura Huberman — Thesis on a Domestication
Best Original Score: Tomás Barreiro — La cocina; Alejandro Otaola — We Shall Not Be Moved; Gustavo Reyes, Andrés Sánchez — Corina; Astrid Rondero — Sujo; Gustavo Santaolalla — Pedro Páramo	Best First Work: We Shall Not Be Moved; Corina; Pedro Páramo; Shame; The Thickness of Dust
Best Sound: Javier Umpierrez, Isabel Muñoz Cota, Michelle Couttolenc, Jaime Baksht — La cocina; Omar Juárez Espino, Patricia Balderas Castro, Josué Ramos Cruz, Alejandro Mayorquin — Sujo; Christian Giraud, Luis Castañeda, Miguel Ángel Molina Gutiérrez. Raymundo Ballesteros Castillo — Jíkuri: Journey to the Land of the Tarahumara; Daniel Rojo Solís. Alejandro Díaz Sánchez, César Gónzalez Cortés — We Shall Not Be Moved; Santiago Nuñez, Jaime Baksht, Michelle Couttolenc, Skip Lievsay, Rich Bologna — Pedro Páramo	Best Editing: Yibrán Asuad — La cocina; Roberto Bolado, Raúl Zendejas — We Shall Not Be Moved; Jorge Cuchí, Victor Gonzáles Fuentes — Bad Actor; Astrid Rondero, Fernanda Valadez, Susan Korda — Sujo; Soledad Salfate — Pedro Páramo; Liora Spilk, Yibrán Asuad — The Invisible Contract
Best Art Direction: Carlos Y. Jacques, Eugenio Caballero — Pedro Páramo; Alisarine Ducolomb — We Shall Not Be Moved; Belén Estrada — Sujo; Lou Pérez Sandi — Corina; Sandra Cabriada — La cocina	Best Makeup: Lucy Betancourt — Pedro Páramo; Alfredo "El Tigre" Mora — Let's Play in the Woods; Dalia Rosales — We Shall Not Be Moved; Fernanda Juárez, Ana Ximena Serrano Sierra — A History of Love and War; Itzel Peña García — La cocina; Roberto Ortiz, Ana Flores — Párvulos: Children of the Apocalypse
Best Costume Design: Anna Terrazas — Pedro Páramo; Adela Cortázar — La cocina; Anna Barroso Bou — Corina; Dalia Rosales — We Shall Not Be Moved; Lupita Peckinpah — The Muleteer; Mariestela Fernández — Technoboys	Best Special Effects: Alejandro Vázquez — Pedro Páramo; Yoshiro Hernández — Párvulos: Children of the Apocalypse; José Martínez — Sujo; Alejandro Vázquez — Let's Play in the Woods; Gregorio Vega — La cocina
Best Visual Effects: Marco Maldonado — Pedro Páramo; Enrique Cantú Garza Villareal, Fernando Campos Mendoza, Raul Campos Mendoza, Zack Rodríguez Moreno — Night Shift; Leo Carrillo — Párvulos: Children of the Apocalypse; Raúl Luna — La cocina; Luis Montemayor — Jíkuri: Journey to the Land of the Tarahumara	Best Documentary Feature: The Invisible Contract; Concerto for Other Hands; Cracked; The Guardian of the Monarchs; State of Silence; The Woman of Stars and Mountains
Best Animated Feature Film: Uma & Haggen	Best Short Film: La cascada; El límite del cuerpo; Passarinho; Spiritum; Viaje de negocios
Best Animated Short Film: Fulgores; Aferrado; Dolores; La carretera de los perros; Ser semilla	Best Documentary Short Film: Anónima inmensidad; Buscando un burro; Hasta encontrarlos; Pequeños zorros; Vientre de luna
Best Ibero-American Film: Kill the Jockey (Argentina); The 47 (Spain); The Dog Thief (Bolivia); In Her Place (Chile); Rita (Guatemala)
