= Eduardo Cortés =

Eduardo Cortés may refer to:

- Eduardo Cortés Cabezas (1859–1916), Chilean politician
- Eduardo Cortes Alvarez ("Eddy Alvarez", born 1990), American baseball player
- Eduardo Cortes (born 1993), Mexican footballer
- Eduardo Cortés (director), Mexican film maker, wrote/directed Tell Me About Yourself

== See also ==
- Eduard Cortés (born 1959), Spanish director and screenwriter
