= We Shall Not Be Moved (film) =

- Theatrical release poster
- Directed by: Pierre Saint-Martin
- Written by: Pierre Saint-Martin; Iker Compeán Leroux
- Produced by: Male Gil; Victor Leycegui
- Starring: Luisa Huertas
- Cinematography: César Gutiérrez Miranda
- Edited by: Roberto Bolado; Raul Zendejas
- Music by: Alejandro Otaola
- Production company: Varios Lobos
- Distributed by: Pimienta Films
- Release dates: March 14, 2024 (Toulouse); July 24, 2025 (Mexico)
- Running time: 100 minutes
- Country: Mexico
- Language: Spanish

We Shall Not Be Moved (Spanish: No nos moverán) is a 2024 Mexican satirical black comedy-drama film co-written and directed by Pierre Saint-Martin, in his directorial debut. It stars Luisa Huertas, Rebeca Manríquez, José Alberto Patiño, Pedro Hernández, Agustina Quinci and Juan Carlos Colombo. The film is inspired by a true story that happened to Saint-Martin’s mother when her brother died in 1968.

The film was selected as the Mexican entry for Best International Feature Film at the 98th Academy Awards, but it was not nominated.

== Plot ==
The film opens with archival footage from the documentary El Grito, depicting the 1968 Mexican student movement and the repression that culminated in the Tlatelolco massacre.

Socorro, a lawyer in her sixties, has spent decades seeking to identify the soldier responsible for the murder of her brother Coque on October 2, 1968. Living in relative isolation in an apartment in Tlatelolco with her sister Esperanza, she maintains strained relationships with both Esperanza and her son Jorge, who grew up under the weight of her unresolved trauma. She has a relatively warmer relationship with Jorge's wife, Lucía. On what would have been Coque's seventy-fifth birthday, Socorro receives a long-lost package revealing the name of the soldier who appears in the final photograph of her brother before his death: Juan Agúndez.

Determined to exact revenge, Socorro tracks down Agúndez with the help of the building's porter, Siddartha. To advance her plan, she blackmails a former superior, now a magistrate in Mexico City, to obtain contact information for a hitman. As her health deteriorates—she suffers from partial deafness and recurrent fainting spells—she mortgages her apartment and arranges Agúndez’s kidnapping. Meanwhile, Lucía, who is pregnant and uncertain about her future due to Jorge’s instability, leaves him and returns to Argentina without disclosing her pregnancy.

When her accomplices falter, Socorro confronts the kidnapped man herself but collapses during the encounter. She wakes up in a hospital and later learns that he was the one who brought her there. The two subsequently share a taxi, during which he explains his version of events. Although he denies being the soldier in the photograph, he admits to having participated in the massacre under orders from a superior officer and offers her a gun to kill him. Socorro ultimately refuses, stating that true justice would have placed him in prison.

The film concludes with Socorro returning home and reconciling with Esperanza. As they reflect and come to terms with Coque's death and the events of 1968, Socorro burns the photograph of her brother while singing "No nos moverán".

== Cast ==
- Luisa Huertas as Socorro
- Rebeca Manríquez as Esperanza
- José Alberto Patiño as Siddartha
- Pedro Hernández as Jorge
- Agustina Quinci as Lucía
- Juan Carlos Colombo as Dr. Candiani
- Gabriela Aguirre as Claudia
- Alberto Trujillo

== Release ==
The film premiered on March 20, 2024, at the 36th Toulouse Cinelatino Film Festival, then screened on June 11, 2024, at the 39th Guadalajara International Film Festival, on July 23, 2024, at the 27th Guanajuato International Film Festival, on October 7, 2024, at the 12th Viva México Film Festival, on November 19, 2024, at the 50th Huelva Ibero-American Film Festival, on April 22, 2025, at the 47th Moscow International Film Festival, and on May 9, 2025, at the 26th Cine Las Americas International Film Festival.

The film was released commercially on July 24, 2025, in Mexican theaters.

== Accolades ==
Year	Award / Festival	Category	Recipient	Result	Ref.
2024	36th Toulouse Cinelatino Film Festival	Student Fiction Award	We Shall Not Be Moved	Won	
2024	36th Toulouse Cinelatino Film Festival	CCAS Fiction Award	We Shall Not Be Moved	Won	
2024	36th Toulouse Cinelatino Film Festival	SFCC Critics' Award	We Shall Not Be Moved	Won	
2024	39th Guadalajara International Film Festival	Mezcal Award - Best Film	We Shall Not Be Moved	Won	
2024	39th Guadalajara International Film Festival	Special Mention for Best Performance	Luisa Huertas	Won	
2024	39th Guadalajara International Film Festival	Audience Award	We Shall Not Be Moved	Won	
2024	48th São Paulo International Film Festival	Best International Film	We Shall Not Be Moved	Nominated	
2024	50th Huelva Ibero-American Film Festival	Colón de Oro	We Shall Not Be Moved	Nominated	
2024	50th Huelva Ibero-American Film Festival	Best Performance	Luisa Huertas	Won	
2024	50th Huelva Ibero-American Film Festival	Casa de Iberoamérica Award	We Shall Not Be Moved	Won	
2025	67th Ariel Awards	Best Picture	We Shall Not Be Moved	Nominated	
2025	67th Ariel Awards	Best Director	Pierre Saint-Martin	Nominated	
2025	67th Ariel Awards	Best Actress	Luisa Huertas	Won	
2025	67th Ariel Awards	Best Supporting Actress	Agustina Quinci	Nominated	
2025	67th Ariel Awards	Best Supporting Actor	Juan Carlos Colombo	Nominated	
2025	67th Ariel Awards	Best Breakthrough Performance	José Alberto Patiño	Won	
2025	67th Ariel Awards	Best Cinematography	César Gutiérrez Miranda	Nominated	
2025	67th Ariel Awards	Best Original Screenplay	Pierre Saint Martin, Iker Compean Leroux	Won	
2025	67th Ariel Awards	Best Original Score	Alejandro Otaola	Nominated	
2025	67th Ariel Awards	Best Sound	Daniel Rojo Solís. Alejandro Díaz Sánchez, César Gónzalez Cortés	Nominated	
2025	67th Ariel Awards	Best Editing	Roberto Bolado, Raúl Zendejas	Nominated	
2025	67th Ariel Awards	Best Art Direction	Alisarine Ducolomb	Nominated	
2025	67th Ariel Awards	Best Costume Design	Dalia Rosales	Nominated	
2025	67th Ariel Awards	Best Makeup	Dalia Rosales	Nominated	
2025	67th Ariel Awards	Best First Work	We Shall Not Be Moved	Won	

== See also ==
- List of Mexican submissions for the Academy Award for Best International Feature Film
- List of submissions to the 98th Academy Awards for Best International Feature Film
