= Huesera: The Bone Woman =

2022 Mexican-Peruvian horror film

- American theatrical release poster
- Spanish: Huesera
- Directed by: Michelle Garza Cervera
- Written by: Michelle Garza Cervera; Abia Castillo
- Produced by: Paulina Villavicencio; Edher Campos
- Starring: Natalia Solián; Alfonso Dosal; Mayra Batalla; Mercedes Hernández; Sonia Couoh; Aida López
- Cinematography: Nur Rubio Sherwell
- Edited by: Adriana Martínez
- Music by: Gibrán Androide; Cabeza de Vaca
- Production companies: Machete; Disruptiva Films; Maligno Gorehouse; Señor Z
- Distributed by: Cinépolis Distribución
- Release dates: 9 June 2022 (Tribeca); 23 February 2023 (Mexico)
- Running time: 97 minutes
- Countries: Mexico; Peru
- Language: Spanish
- Budget: $750,000
- Box office: $1.6 million

Huesera: The Bone Woman is a 2022 psychological supernatural body horror film co-written and directed by Michelle Garza Cervera in her directorial debut. It stars Natalia Solián as Valeria Hernandez, a pregnant woman who finds herself threatened by occult forces. Alongside Solián, the film's cast includes Alfonso Dosal, Mayra Batalla, Mercedes Hernández, Sonia Couoh and Aida López.

Huesera: The Bone Woman had its world premiere at the Tribeca Festival on 9 June 2022 and won the Best New Narrative Director and Nora Ephron awards.

== Plot ==
Valeria Hernandez, a young Mexican woodworker, reveals to her husband Raúl that she is pregnant with their first child, much to their excitement. A few months later, Valeria takes Raúl to visit her family for Mother's Day. During the visit, Valeria notices that she has begun to neurotically crack her knuckles, but ignores it. That night, as her husband sleeps, Valeria sees a woman in the building opposite hers break her legs by jumping off a balcony. When the woman gets up, her body makes loud, bone-cracking noises, and Valeria sees that the woman has no eyes or mouth, terrifying her. After waking up Raúl, however, the woman inexplicably vanishes without a trace.

As time progresses, Valeria has more disturbing visions involving the faceless woman, which starts impacting her ability to sleep. After telling her aunt Isabel about the visions, Isabel takes her to meet Ursula, a curandera. After performing a ritual on Valeria, Ursula tells her that she should start feeling better soon. However, Ursula also informs Valeria that there is "another way", and that she should call her in case she starts feeling bad again.

A few days later, Valeria is tasked with babysitting her sister Vero's young children while Vero and her parents go out to a party. While babysitting the kids, Valeria has another vision of the woman, who, though invisible, now appears to be physically present inside the house. Panicking, Valeria grabs the kids, locks them in an upstairs bedroom and uses a panic button given to her by her father to alert the neighborhood watch. When they get there, however, the woman has disappeared, and the family dog has been found dead, apparently having been strangled with its chain. The incident leaves the children injured and traumatised, causing strain in Valeria's relationship with her family, with Vero telling her that she will be inept as a parent.

Valeria meets with Isabel, the only one who believes her story about the incident. She tells her that she wants to meet with Ursula again, but Isabel is concerned for her safety, since, although the "other way" mentioned by Ursula does work, it could likely be extremely dangerous for her. Later, during a dinner party at home with Raúl, a stressed-out Valeria goes into the baby's room to smoke a cigarette, and the crib that Valeria had made for the baby suddenly bursts into flames. Despite Valeria swearing her innocence, Raúl blames her for the ruined crib. Raúl also tells Valeria that he knows that she had a run-in with Octavia, a high school friend of Valeria's with whom she once had a [sexual] relationship, and that the two had sex around the same time as the incident with Vero's children, which Raúl also knows about.

After falling out with Octavia, Valeria goes into labour and gives birth to a baby girl. However, Valeria is no longer excited at the prospect of being a mother. One night, while Raúl is out of town, Valeria, incensed by the baby's non-stop crying, gets out of bed and, while seemingly possessed, puts it in the fridge before going to bed. When she wakes up, she panics when she finds her daughter missing, but finds her miraculously alive not long after. The incident leads her to apologise to Octavia and meet with Ursula again. Valeria, the baby, Ursula and Isabel travel to a run-down establishment in the woods, where Ursula and a group of other curanderas performs a ritual on Valeria and the baby. As part of the ritual, Valeria has her head dunked underwater. When she resurfaces, everyone has disappeared, and she follows the sound of her crying baby out into the woods, where she encounters a writhing mass of naked, faceless figures. The figures swarm and contort Valeria's body, after which she has a vision of herself in a cloak walking away while on fire.

Valeria reawakens, with her and the baby both unharmed. Soon after, she reunites with Raúl and gives him the baby, before packing her bags and leaving him to raise their daughter on his own.

== Cast ==
- Natalia Solián as Valeria Hernandez
- Alfonso Dosal as Raúl
- Mercedes Hernández as Isabel
- Martha Claudia Moreno as Ursula
- Mayra Batalla as Octavia
- Sonia Couoh as Vero
- Aída López as Maricarmen, Valeria's mother
- Enoc Leaño as Luis, Valeria's father
- Anahí Allué as Norma, Raúl's mother

== Production ==
Principal photography took place in Mexico City in 2021.

== Release ==
Huesera: The Bone Woman had its world premiere at the Tribeca Festival in New York on 9 June 2022, as part of the festival's "Midnight" section.

The film was set to receive a North American theatrical release by XYZ Films on 10 February 2023. It was scheduled to be released on the VOD platform Shudder on 16 February 2023.

Distributed by Cinépolis Distribución, it had its commercial premiere in Mexican theaters on 23 February 2023. It was then released in Peruvian theaters on 27 April 2023.

== Reception ==
=== Critical reception ===
On the review aggregator website Rotten Tomatoes, 97% of 92 critics' reviews are positive, with an average rating of 7.8/10. The website's consensus reads: "A bone-chilling body horror, Huesera offers genre fans a twisted take on What to Expect When You're Expecting." Metacritic, which uses a weighted average, assigned the film a score of 81 out of 100, based on 16 critics, indicating "universal acclaim".

Variety's Manuel Betancourt called Huesera "at times spine-chillingly terrifying," writing that it "rarely [resorts] to jump scares", relying instead on "increasingly disturbing imagery" and sound design. Betancourt concluded: "A fable of modern motherhood, of calcified feminist ideas about domesticity and women's agency, Huesera offers a Mexican folk-inspired spin on such horror classics as The Babadook, Hereditary, Rosemary's Baby and As Boas Maneiras." Natalia Winkelman of The New York Times commended Solian's performance, the film's shot composition and its themes, writing that the film "raises the provocative idea that motherhood can feel akin to a curse [...] the movie — like many great works of vision, scale be damned — is almost an exorcism itself, stripping away fuss and banalities to expose raw truths."

Michael Gingold of Rue Morgue wrote that the film "inverts the pregnancy-fear subgenre [...] while also paying off the expectations of a genre piece", and called the film "a singular achievement on the international horror scene." Meagan Navarro, in her review of the film for Bloody Disgusting, praised Garza Cervera's direction, writing that "her firm grasp of imagery and tension-building is focused and effective, using fear to engender sympathy with laser precision. Even if Valeria's denial puts her multiple steps behind the viewer, Cervera's strong debut sweeps you up in Valeria's nightmare regardless."

=== Accolades ===
Year	Award / Festival	Category	Recipient	Result	Ref.
2022	Tribeca Festival	Best New Narrative Director	Michelle Garza Cervera	Won	
2022	Tribeca Festival	Nora Ephron Award	Michelle Garza Cervera	Won	
2022	Neuchâtel International Fantastic Film Festival	Best Film	Michelle Garza Cervera	Nominated	
2022	Adelaide Film Festival	Best Feature Film	Michelle Garza Cervera	Nominated	
2022	Sarajevo Film Festival	Special Award for Promoting Gender Equality	Michelle Garza Cervera	Nominated	
2022	Sitges - Catalonian International Film Festival	Blood Window Award	Michelle Garza Cervera	Won	
2022	Sitges - Catalonian International Film Festival	Citizen Kane Award – Best New Director	Michelle Garza Cervera	Won	
2022	Chicago International Film Festival	Gold Q-Hugo	Michelle Garza Cervera	Nominated	
2022	Athens International Film Festival	Golden Athena Award - Best Film	Michelle Garza Cervera	Nominated	
2022	Jakarta Film Week	Golden Feature Award	Michelle Garza Cervera	Special mention	
2022	Morelia International Film Festival	Best Mexican Feature Film	Michelle Garza Cervera	Nominated	
2022	Morelia International Film Festival	Best Mexican Feature Film - Audience Award	Michelle Garza Cervera	Won	
2022	Mar del Plata International Film Festival	Latin-American Competition - Best Feature Film	Michelle Garza Cervera	Nominated	
2022	Fantasy Filmfest	Tele5 Fresh Blood Award	Michelle Garza Cervera	Nominated	
2022	Insólito Fantastic Film Festival	Black Cat - Best Picture	Michelle Garza Cervera	Won	
2022	Insólito Fantastic Film Festival	Best Director - Special Mention	Michelle Garza Cervera	Won	
2022	Torino Film Festival	Crazies Competition - Best Film	Michelle Garza Cervera	Won	
2022	Feratum Fantastic Film Festival	Best Horror Feature Film	Michelle Garza Cervera	Won	
2022	Feratum Fantastic Film Festival	Best Director	Michelle Garza Cervera	Won	
2022	Feratum Fantastic Film Festival	Best Visual Effects	Raul Prado	Won	
2023	NOAM Faenza Film Festival	Città di Faenza Award	Michelle Garza Cervera	Won	
2023	Palm Springs International Film Festival	Best Ibero-American Film	Michelle Garza Cervera	Nominated	
2023	65th Ariel Awards	Best Picture	Husera: The Bone Woman	Nominated	
2023	65th Ariel Awards	Best Director	Michelle Garza Cervera	Nominated	
2023	65th Ariel Awards	Best Actress	Natalia Solián	Nominated	
2023	65th Ariel Awards	Best Supporting Actress	Mayra Batalla	Nominated	
2023	65th Ariel Awards	Best Supporting Actress	Martha Claudia Moreno	Nominated	
2023	65th Ariel Awards	Best Breakthrough Performance	Isabel Luna	Nominated	
2023	65th Ariel Awards	Best Original Screenplay	Michelle Garza Cervera & Abia Castillo	Won	
2023	65th Ariel Awards	Best Cinematography	Nur Rubio Sherwell	Nominated	
2023	65th Ariel Awards	Best Original Score	Gibrán Andrade & Rafael Manrique	Nominated	
2023	65th Ariel Awards	Best Sound	Christian Giraud, Pablo Lach & Omar Pareja	Nominated	
2023	65th Ariel Awards	Best Editing	Adriana Martínez	Nominated	
2023	65th Ariel Awards	Best Art Direction	Ana Bellido	Nominated	
2023	65th Ariel Awards	Best Makeup	Adam Zoller	Won	
2023	65th Ariel Awards	Best Costume Design	Gabriela Gower	Nominated	
2023	65th Ariel Awards	Best Special Effects	Raúl Camarera, Gustavo Campos, Miguel Ángel Rodríguez & Juan Carlos Santos	Won	
2023	65th Ariel Awards	Best Visual Effects	Raúl Luna	Nominated	
2023	65th Ariel Awards	Best Debut Film	Husera: The Bone Woman	Won	
2023	33rd Gotham Independent Film Awards	Breakthrough Director	Michelle Garza Cervera	Nominated	
2024	11th Platino Awards	Best Editing	Adriana Martínez	Nominated	
2024	11th Platino Awards	Best Sound	Christian Giraudy and Omar Pareja	Nominated	
