= Cracked (film) =

- Theatrical release poster
- Directed by: Alana Simões
- Written by: Alana Simões
- Produced by: José Ramón Mikelajáuregui
- Starring: Celeste Limón
- Cinematography: Gabriel Molina Ruvalcaba
- Music by: Kenji Kishi
- Production company: Cinematrópodos
- Distributed by: FiGa Films
- Release dates: October 22, 2024 (FICM); May 15, 2025 (Mexico)
- Running time: 81 minutes
- Country: Mexico
- Language: Spanish

Cracked (Spanish: La falla, lit. 'The failure') is a 2024 Mexican documentary film written and directed by Alana Simões. It follows the student life of a small second-grade classroom in a Mexican school during the last month of one of its teachers.

== Synopsis ==
The second-grade children learn that their teacher Celeste will be leaving their class. They are sad, as she only has a few days left before transferring to another school. Together, they experience a month filled with change, direction, and revelation.

== Cast ==
- Celeste Limón
- Iker Ortega
- Mateo Camarena
- Sarahí González
- Karol Jiménez
- Brandon Rivas
- Kanon Gutiérrez

== Release ==
The film had its world premiere on October 22, 2024, at the 22nd Morelia International Film Festival, then was commercially released on May 15, 2025, in Mexican theaters.

== Accolades ==
Award	Ceremony date	Category	Recipient(s)	Result	Ref.
Morelia International Film Festival	25 October 2024	Best Mexican Documentary Feature Film	Cracked	Nominated	
Morelia International Film Festival	25 October 2024	Best Mexican Documentary Feature Film - Special Mention	Cracked	Won	
Ariel Awards	20 September 2025	Best Documentary Feature	Cracked	Nominated	
