= Delirio (2024 film) =

- Theatrical release poster
- Directed by: Alexandra Latishev Salazar
- Written by: Alexandra Latishev Salazar
- Produced by: Cynthia García Calvo; Alexandra Latishev Salazar
- Starring: Helena Calderón; Liliana Biamonte; Ana Ulloa
- Cinematography: Esteban Chinchilla
- Edited by: Soledad Salfate
- Music by: Alexandru Catona
- Production companies: Cyan Prods; La Linterna Films
- Release dates: June 10, 2024 (FICG); October 24, 2024 (Costa Rica)
- Running time: 74 minutes
- Countries: Costa Rica; Chile
- Languages: Spanish; Russian

Delirio (lit. 'Delirium') is a 2024 psychological horror film written, co-produced and directed by Alexandra Latishev Salazar. It stars Helena Calderón, Liliana Biamonte and Ana Ulloa. It follows a kid who moves into her grandmother's house where a menacing presence surrounds her home.

== Synopsis ==
Masha is an 11-year-old girl who moves in next door to Grandma Dinia's house with her mother Elisa. There, family secrets begin to unravel, Dinia's dementia worsens, and the menacing presence of an unknown figure watches over them.

== Cast ==
- Helena Calderón as Masha
- Liliana Biamonte as Elisa
- Ana Ulloa as Dinia
- Grettel Méndez
- Leynar Gomez
- Alexei Calderón

== Release ==
The film had its world premiere on June 10, 2024, at the 39th Guadalajara International Film Festival, and then screened on June 26, 2024, at the Costa Rica International Film Festival.

The film was released commercially on October 24, 2024, in Costa Rican theaters.

== Accolades ==
| Year | Award / Festival | Category | Recipient | Result | Ref. |
|---|---|---|---|---|---|
| 2024 | 39th Guadalajara International Film Festival | Best Ibero-American Fiction Feature Film | Delirio | Nominated | |
