= The Muleteer =

- Theatrical release poster
- Directed by: Isabel Cristina Fregoso
- Written by: Isabel Cristina Fregoso
- Produced by: Edher Campos; Regina Vergara Perezcastro
- Starring: Andrea Aldama; Ale Cosío; Luis Vegas
- Cinematography: María Sarasvati Herrera
- Edited by: Martha Uc
- Music by: Carlos Vértiz; Héctor Ruiz
- Production companies: Film Commission of the State of Jalisco; Machete
- Release dates: June 13, 2024 (FICG); June 19, 2025 (Mexico)
- Running time: 102 minutes
- Country: Mexico
- Language: Spanish

The Muleteer (Spanish: La arriera) is a 2024 Mexican coming-of-age adventure drama film co-written and directed by Isabel Cristina Fregoso. It stars Andrea Aldama, Ale Cosío and Luis Vegas. It follows a teenage girl who embarks on a journey dressed as a muleteer to find her father and discover his identity.

== Synopsis ==
In 1935, in the Sierra Occidental of Jalisco, Emilia falls in love with her cousin Caro. This, coupled with her impetuous personality and her desire to find her father, leads her to seek a different destiny than the one awaiting her on the ranch where she grew up. Dressed as a muleteer, she begins a journey in which she manages to find herself, her father, and a place to love freely.

== Cast ==
- Andrea Aldama as Emilia
- Ale Cosío as Caro
- Luis Vegas as Martín
- Baltimore Beltrán as Anselmo
- Damayanti Quintanar as Nicolás
- Sasha González as María
- Christian Ramos as Jesús
- Mayra Batalla as Inés
- Pascacio López as Pancho
- Waldo Facco as Secondary

== Production ==
Principal photography lasted six weeks on location in Mascota, La Estancia, San Sebastián del Oeste, El Grullo, and Pascualitos Beach.

== Release ==
The Muleteer had its world premiere on June 13, 2024, at the 39th Guadalajara International Film Festival, then was screened on October 25, 2025, at the 26th OUTshine Film Festival, on November 6, 2024, at the 18th Portland Latin American Film Festival, on February 8, 2025, at the Reelout Queer Film Festival, on March 21, 2025, at the BFI Flare: London LGBTIQ+ Film Festival, and on June 19, 2025, at the 29th MIX Mexico Festival.

The film was released commercially on June 19, 2025, in Mexican theaters.

== Accolades ==
Year	Award / Festival	Category	Recipient	Result	Ref.
2024	39th Guadalajara International Film Festival	Mezcal Award - Best Film	The Muleteer	Nominated	
2024	39th Guadalajara International Film Festival	Best Directing	Isabel Cristina Fregoso	Won	
2024	39th Guadalajara International Film Festival	Best Cinematography	María Sarasvati Herrera	Won	
2024	39th Guadalajara International Film Festival	Maguey Award	The Muleteer	Nominated	
2024	39th Guadalajara International Film Festival	Hecho en Jalisco Award	The Muleteer	Nominated	
2024	27th Guanajuato International Film Festival	Best Mexican Fiction Feature Film	The Muleteer	Nominated	
2025	67th Ariel Awards	Best Breakthrough Performance	Ale Cosío	Nominated	
2025	67th Ariel Awards	Best Cinematography	María Sarasvati Herrera	Nominated	
2025	67th Ariel Awards	Best Costume Design	Lupita Peckinpah	Nominated	
