= Corina (film) =

- Theatrical release poster
- Directed by: Urzula Barba Hopfner
- Written by: Urzula Barba Hopfner; Samuel Sosa
- Produced by: Urzula Barba Hopfner; Carlos Hernández Vázquez; Iván López-Barba
- Starring: Naian González Norvind; Cristo Fernández
- Cinematography: Gerardo Guerra
- Edited by: José Villalobos
- Music by: Gustavo Reyes; Andrés Sánchez
- Production companies: Mandarina Cine; Cobra Films; Espectro Mx Film; CM Films
- Distributed by: Cinépolis Distribución
- Release dates: June 8, 2024 (FICG); January 9, 2025 (Mexico)
- Running time: 96 minutes
- Country: Mexico
- Language: Spanish

Corina is a 2024 Mexican comedy-drama film co-written, co-produced and directed by Urzula Barba Hopfner in her directorial debut. It stars Naian González Norvind and Cristo Fernández. It is about a woman with agoraphobia who must overcome her fears to search for a mysterious writer who will save her job.

== Synopsis ==
Corina is 20 years old and rarely leaves her home except to work at a publishing house in the neighborhood where she lives. After making a grave mistake with the ending of the company's most famous book series, Corina must overcome her fears with Carlos's help and embark on a journey in search of a mysterious writer to save her job and that of her colleagues.

== Cast ==
- Naian González Norvind as Corina
- Cristo Fernández as Carlos
- Ariana Candela as Fernanda
- Carolina Politi as Rene
  - Maite Urrutia as Young Rene
- Mariana Giménez as Regina
- Mónica Bejarano as Ms. Diaz
- Elena Gore as Sandrita
- Alejandro Mendicuti as Creative Man
- Ruth Ramos as Creative Woman
- Laura de Ita as Lili
- Myrna Moguel as Dona Filepe
- Christopher Cardenas as Young Corina's father
- Azucena Evans as Bread Seller
- Gerardo Trejoluna

== Production ==
Principal photography lasted 5 weeks, ending on April 15, 2023, in Jalisco, Guadalajara.

== Release ==
Corina had its world premiere on June 8, 2024, at the 39th Guadalajara International Film Festival, then screened on July 19, 2024, at the 27th Guanajuato International Film Festival, on October 23, 2024, at the 22nd Morelia International Film Festival, on November 17, 2025, at the 28th Tallinn Black Nights Film Festival, on December 5, 2024, at the Los Cabos International Film Festival, on March 8, 2025, at the South by Southwest Film & TV Festival, on April 12, 2025, at the 42nd Miami Film Festival, on May 20, 2025, at the Algiers Ibero-American Film Festival, on June 11, 2025, at the 27th Shanghai International Film Festival, and on June 22, 2025, at the 33rd Raindance Film Festival.

The film was commercially released on January 9, 2025, in Mexican theaters.

== Accolades ==
Year	Award / Festival	Category	Recipient	Result	Ref.
2024	39th Guadalajara International Film Festival	Mezcal Award	Corina	Nominated	
2024	39th Guadalajara International Film Festival	Hecho en Jalisco - Best Film	Corina	Won	
2024	27th Guanajuato International Film Festival	Press Award	Corina	Won	
2024	28th Tallinn Black Nights Film Festival	Best First Feature Film Award	Corina	Nominated	
2024	12th Gran Fiesta Del Cine Mexicano	Best Film	Corina	Won	
2024	12th Gran Fiesta Del Cine Mexicano	Best Fiction Director	Urzula Barba Hopfner	Won	
2024	12th Gran Fiesta Del Cine Mexicano	Best Actress in a Feature Film	Naian Gonzalez Norvind	Won	
2024	12th Gran Fiesta Del Cine Mexicano	Best Screenplay	Urzula Barba Hopfner & Samuel Sosa	Won	
2025	South by Southwest Film & TV Festival	Global Section - Audience Award	Corina	Won	
2025	42nd Miami Film Festival	Jordan Ressler First Feature Award	Corina	Nominated	
2025	50th Diosas de Plata	Best Film	Corina	Nominated	
2025	50th Diosas de Plata	Best First Work	Urzula Barba Hopfner	Won	
2025	50th Diosas de Plata	Best Direction	Urzula Barba Hopfner	Nominated	
2025	50th Diosas de Plata	Best Actress	Naian González Norvind	Won	
2025	50th Diosas de Plata	Best Supporting Actor	Cristo Fernández	Nominated	
2025	50th Diosas de Plata	Best Supporting Actress	Carolina Politi	Nominated	
2025	50th Diosas de Plata	Best Original Screenplay	Urzula Barba Hopfner & Samuel Sosa	Nominated	
2025	50th Diosas de Plata	Best Cinematography	Gerardo Guerra	Nominated	
2025	50th Diosas de Plata	Best Editing	José Villalobos	Nominated	
2025	50th Diosas de Plata	Best Music	Gustavo Reyes & Andrés Sánchez	Won	
2025	27th Shanghai International Film Festival	Audience Choice Award	Corina	Won	
2025	67th Ariel Awards	Best First Work	Corina	Nominated	
2025	67th Ariel Awards	Best Director	Urzula Barba Hopfner	Nominated	
2025	67th Ariel Awards	Best Actress	Naian González Norvind	Nominated	
2025	67th Ariel Awards	Best Supporting Actress	Carolina Politi	Nominated	
2025	67th Ariel Awards	Best Supporting Actress	Laura de Ita	Nominated	
2025	67th Ariel Awards	Best Original Screenplay	Urzula Barba Hopfner & Samuel Sosa	Nominated	
2025	67th Ariel Awards	Best Costume Design	Anna Barroso Bou	Nominated	
2025	67th Ariel Awards	Best Art Direction	Lou Pérez Sandi	Nominated	
2025	67th Ariel Awards	Best Original Score	Gustavo Reyes & Andrés Sánchez	Nominated	
2026	Luminus Awards	Best Film	Corina	Won	
2026	Luminus Awards	Best Director	Urzula Barba Hopfner	Nominated	
2026	Luminus Awards	Best Actress	Naian González Norvind	Won	
