= Prayers for the Stolen =

2021 film

- Theatrical release poster
- Spanish: Noche de fuego
- Directed by: Tatiana Huezo
- Written by: Tatiana Huezo
- Based on: Prayers for the Stolen by Jennifer Clement
- Produced by: Nicolás Celis; Jim Stark
- Starring: Ana Cristina Ordóñez González; Marya Membreño; Mayra Batalla; Blanca Itzel Pérez; Camila Gaal; Giselle Barrera Sánchez; Alejandra Camacho; Julián Guzmán Girón; José Estrada; Norma Pablo; Eileen Yáñez; Memo Villegas
- Cinematography: Dariela Ludlow
- Edited by: Miguel Schverdfinger
- Music by: Jacobo Lieberman; Leonardo Heiblum
- Release dates: 15 July 2021 (Cannes); 16 September 2021 (Mexico)
- Country: Mexico
- Language: Spanish

Prayers for the Stolen (Spanish: Noche de fuego, lit. 'Night of Fire') is a 2021 Mexican drama film directed and written by Tatiana Huezo, which adapts Jennifer Clement's novel Prayers for the Stolen.

== Plot ==
Three girls- Ana, Paula, and Maria- come of age in San Miguel, Jalisco, a rural village terrorized by drug cartels. During the harvest season, many villagers work in the poppy fields for the cartels. Cartel violence has left the villagers with limited economic opportunity and access to education and medical care. Some, including Ana's father, have left the village and immigrated to try to find work and support their family.

Members of the cartels regularly rape and kidnap the women and children of the village. Rita, Ana's mother, digs a hole for Ana and from a young age teaches her to hide in it, to prevent her from being taken away. Rita and Ana go to a hillside to get cell service in order to call her father, but the call goes unanswered.

Ana stops by a neighbor's house on her way home and sees her crying and bloody after being sexually assaulted by a cartel member. The woman tells her to go home.

When her mother sees Ana wearing lipstick, Here she cuts her hair like a man. Ana then goes to the house of her friend Juana, who is rumored to have been kidnapped, and looks out the window. The parents listen to the teacher. He reports that the cartels are demanding immediate payment.

The movie makes a time jump and goes to about 5-6 years later. Ana is moved by what the teacher tells her and dreams of changing the existing order. Then the cartels come to get Ana. But Ana immediately hides. The movie closes with a truckload of people, including the girls, leaving the town.

== Cast ==
- Mayra Batalla as Rita.
- Alejandra Camacho as Paula (teen).
- Marya Membreño as Ana (teen).
- Ana Cristina Ordóñez González as Ana (child).
- Memo Villegas as Leonardo.
- Norma Pablo as Luz.
- Giselle Barrera Sánchez as María (teen).
- Blanca Itzel Pérez as María (child).
- Julián Guzmán Girón as Margarito (teen).
- David Illescas as the teacher.
- Eileen Yañez as Concha.
- Camila Gaal as Paula (child).
- Olivia Lagunas as Zulma.
- Teresa Sánchez as Helena.
- Andrés Chavero Medina as Joel.
- Gabriela Núñez as Artemia.
- José Estrada as Margarito (child).
- Daniela Arroio as the Doctor.

== Release ==
In June 2021, the film was selected to compete in the Un Certain Regard section at the 2021 Cannes Film Festival. At Cannes, it won a Special Mention in the Un Certain Regard section.

The film was theatrically released in Mexico on 16 September 2021. In October 2021, it was disclosed to be the Mexican entry for the Best International Feature Film at the 94th Academy Awards. Ultimately, it was not nominated. It began streaming on Netflix on 17 November 2021.

== Reception ==
=== Critical response ===
Prayers for the Stolen has an approval rating of 96% on review aggregator website Rotten Tomatoes, based on 56 reviews, and an average rating of 7.9/10. The website's critical consensus states: "As absorbing as it is harrowing, Prayers for the Stolen observes life under the shadow of systemic violence with startling clarity". Metacritic assigned the film a weighted average score of 83 out of 100, based on 14 critics, indicating "universal acclaim".

=== Awards and nominations ===
Award	Date of ceremony	Category	Recipient(s)	Result	Ref(s)
Cannes Film Festival	17 July 2021	Un Certain Regard	Tatiana Huezo	Nominated	
Cannes Film Festival	17 July 2021	Un Certain Regard - Special Mention	Tatiana Huezo	Won	
San Sebastián International Film Festival	25 September 2021	Horizontes Latinos	Prayers for the Stolen	Won	
San Sebastián International Film Festival	25 September 2021	RTVE Otra Mirada Award	Prayers for the Stolen	Won	
Forqué Awards	11 December 2021	Best Latin-American Film	Prayers for the Stolen	Won	
Los Angeles Film Critics Association Awards	18 December 2021	Next Generation Award	Tatiana Huezo	Won	
Palm Springs International Film Festival	6 January 2022	Young Cineastes Award	Tatiana Huezo	Nominated	
Palm Springs International Film Festival	6 January 2022	FIPRESCI Prize for Best International Feature Film	Prayers for the Stolen	Won	
Palm Springs International Film Festival	6 January 2022	Best Ibero-American Film	Prayers for the Stolen	Won	
Independent Spirit Awards	6 March 2022	Best International Film	Prayers for the Stolen	Nominated	
Directors Guild of America Awards	12 March 2022	Outstanding First-Time Feature Film Director	Tatiana Huezo	Nominated	
Satellite Awards	2 April 2022	Best Foreign Language Film	Prayers for the Stolen	Nominated	
Platino Awards	1 May 2022	Best Ibero-American Film	Prayers for the Stolen	Nominated	
Platino Awards	1 May 2022	Best Director	Tatiana Huezo	Nominated	
Platino Awards	1 May 2022	Best Supporting Actress	Cristina Ordóñez González	Nominated	
Ariel Awards	11 October 2022	Best Picture	Prayers for the Stolen	Won	
Ariel Awards	11 October 2022	Best Director	Tatiana Huezo	Nominated	
Ariel Awards	11 October 2022	Best Actress	Cristina Ordóñez González	Nominated	
Ariel Awards	11 October 2022	Best Supporting Actor	Memo Villegas	Nominated	
Ariel Awards	11 October 2022	Best Supporting Actress	Eileen Yáñez	Nominated	
Ariel Awards	11 October 2022	Best Supporting Actress	Mayra Batalla	Won	
Ariel Awards	11 October 2022	Best Supporting Actress	Norma Pablo	Nominated	
Ariel Awards	11 October 2022	Best Breakthrough Performance	Alejandra Camacho	Nominated	
Ariel Awards	11 October 2022	Best Breakthrough Performance	Giselle Barrera	Nominated	
Ariel Awards	11 October 2022	Best Adapted Screenplay	Tatiana Huezo	Won	
Ariel Awards	11 October 2022	Best Cinematography	Dariela Ludlow	Won	
Ariel Awards	11 October 2022	Best Original Score	Leonardo Heiblum and Jacobo Lieberman	Nominated	
Ariel Awards	11 October 2022	Best Editing	Yibrán Asuad	Nominated	
Ariel Awards	11 October 2022	Best Costume Design	Úrsula Schneider	Nominated	
Ariel Awards	11 October 2022	Best Art Design	Oscar Tello	Nominated	
Ariel Awards	11 October 2022	Best Makeup	Roberto Ortiz and Ana Robles	Won	
Ariel Awards	11 October 2022	Best Visual Effects	Miguel de Hoyos	Nominated	
Ariel Awards	11 October 2022	Best Special Effects	Ricardo Arvizu Jr.	Won	
Ariel Awards	11 October 2022	Best Sound	Lena Esquenazi, Federico G. Jordan and Paulo Gama	Won	
Goya Awards	11 February 2023	Best Ibero-American Film	Prayers for the Stolen	Nominated	

== See also ==
- List of submissions to the 94th Academy Awards for Best International Feature Film
- List of Mexican submissions for the Academy Award for Best International Feature Film
