= Bad Actor (film) =

- Theatrical release poster
- Spanish: Un actor malo
- Directed by: Jorge Cuchí
- Written by: Jorge Cuchí
- Produced by: Yair Ponce; Veronica Valadez P.; Jorge Cuchí
- Starring: Alfonso Dosal; Fiona Palomo; Gerardo Trejoluna; Juan Pablo de Santiago; Karla Coronado; Patricia Soto
- Cinematography: José Casillas
- Edited by: Víctor González Fuentes; Jorge Cuchí
- Production company: Catatonia Cine
- Distributed by: Cinépolis Distribución
- Release dates: November 2023 (PÖFF); 4 April 2024 (Mexico)
- Country: Mexico
- Language: Spanish

Bad Actor (Spanish: Un actor malo) is a 2023 Mexican drama film written and directed by Jorge Cuchí starring Alfonso Dosal and Fiona Palomo.

== Plot ==
Actress Sandra Navarro accuses fellow actor Daniel Zavala of rape while they were performing an intimate scene together, and the latter claims he is innocent. Producers try to prevent the situation from leaking out.

== Cast ==
- Alfonso Dosal as Daniel Zavala
- Fiona Palomo as Sandra Navarro
- Gerardo Trejoluna as Gerardo Villa
- Juan Pablo de Santiago as Luis Medina
- Karla Coronado as Regina Torres
- Ana Karina Guevara as Patricia Morales
- Mónica Jiménez
- Patricia Soto
- Luis José Sevilla
- Erick Israel Consuelo
- Solana Azulay

== Production ==
The film was produced by Catatonia Cine.

== Release ==
Bad Actor landed its world premiere at the 27th Tallinn Black Nights Film Festival (PÖFF). It was released theatrically in Mexico on 4 April 2024 by Cinépolis Distribución.

== Reception ==
Wendy Ide of ScreenDaily described Bad Actor as "an ever-tightening chokehold of a film".

Alejandro Alemán of El Universal deemed Bad Actor to be "an uncomfortable, powerful film that will generate conversation".

Álvaro Cueva of Milenio billed the film as a "masterpiece".

== Accolades ==
Year	Award	Category	Nominee(s)	Result	Ref.
2025	67th Ariel Awards	Best Picture		Nominated	
2025	67th Ariel Awards	Best Actor	Alfonso Dosal	Nominated	
2025	67th Ariel Awards	Best Actress	Fiona Palomo	Nominated	
2025	67th Ariel Awards	Best Original Screenplay	Jorge Cuchí	Nominated	
2025	67th Ariel Awards	Best Editing	Jorge Cuchí, Victor González Fuentes	Nominated	

== See also ==
- List of Mexican films of 2024
