= The Kitchen (play) =

1957 Play by Arnold Wesker

1961 Jonathan Cape edition

The Kitchen is a 1957 play by Arnold Wesker. It was Wesker's first work and is his most performed play. It has been produced in sixty cities including Rio de Janeiro, Tokyo, Paris (where it was the first widely recognised production by Théâtre du Soleil in 1967), Moscow, Montreal and Zurich.

The play follows the staff in a cafe's kitchen during the course of a busy morning.

It has been adapted as a film twice: The Kitchen (1961) and La cocina (2024).

In 1977 the BBC2 show Play of the Week produced a television adaptation, directed by Alvin Rakoff.

The play was subject to a major revival at the National Theatre's Olivier Theatre in 2011.
