= Concerto for Other Hands =

- Theatrical release poster
- Directed by: Ernesto González Díaz
- Written by: Ernesto González Díaz
- Produced by: Ernesto González Díaz; Grace Ríos Vázquez
- Starring: David González Ladrón de Guevara; José Luis González Moya
- Cinematography: Daniel Gama; Rafa Ramírez Ramírez
- Edited by: Ernesto González Díaz; Grace Ríos Vázquez
- Music by: David González Ladrón de Guevara; José Luis González Moya
- Production company: Mirall Cinema
- Distributed by: Benuca Films
- Release dates: June 11, 2024 (FICG); July 10, 2025 (Mexico)
- Running time: 79 minutes
- Country: Mexico
- Languages: Spanish; English

Concerto for Other Hands (Spanish: Concierto para otras manos) is a 2024 Mexican documentary film written, co-produced, co-edited and directed by Ernesto González Díaz in his directorial debut. It follows David González Ladrón de Guevara, a boy with Miller Syndrome, who tries to build a musical career playing piano assisted by his father.

== Synopsis ==
David González Ladrón de Guevara dreams of becoming a pianist like his father, José Luis González Moya, who believes it's impossible due to his son's Miller Syndrome. However, David shows him that he can play his way, and together they embark on a musical journey that culminates in a new challenge for David: premiering the difficult piano concerto his father composed for him.

== Cast ==
- David González Ladrón de Guevara as Himself
- José Luis González Moya as Himself

== Production ==
Ernesto González Díaz, the director, filmed the lives of David and José Luis in Guadalajara, Mexico, for five years.

== Release ==
Concerto for Other Hands had its world premiere on June 11, 2024, at the 39th Guadalajara International Film Festival, then screened on August 10, 2024, at the Doqumenta International Festival of Film and Non-Fiction Narratives, in August-September 2025, at the Tamatán Mexican Film Festival, on October 11, 2024, at the 19th Mexico City International Documentary Film Festival, on November 20, 2024, at the 17th Zanate Mexican Documentary Film Festival, and on April 1, 2025, at the 7th MICMX International Film Festival.

The film had a limited theatrical release on July 10, 2025, in Mexican theaters.

== Accolades ==
Year	Award / Festival	Category	Recipient	Result	Ref.
2024	39th Guadalajara International Film Festival	Hecho en Jalisco - Best Film	Concerto for Other Hands	Nominated	
2024	12th Gran Fiesta de Cine Mexicano	Best Documentary Feature	Concerto for Other Hands	Won	
2024	17th Zanate Mexican Documentary Film Festival	Zanate Grand Prize	Concerto for Other Hands	Nominated	
2024	17th Zanate Mexican Documentary Film Festival	Zanate Audience Award	Concerto for Other Hands	Won	
2024	Film Festival Cine al Margen	Best Editing	Concerto for Other Hands	Won	
2025	7th MICMX International Film Festival	Best Mexican Documentary Feature	Concerto for Other Hands	Nominated	
2025	50th Diosas de Plata	Best Documentary	Concerto for Other Hands	Won	
2025	67th Ariel Awards	Best Documentary Feature	Concerto for Other Hands	Nominated	
