= Dead Man's Switch (film) =

- Theatrical release poster
- Directed by: Alejandro Gerber Bicecci
- Written by: Alejandro Gerber Bicecci
- Produced by: Alejandro Gerber Bicecci; Juan Pablo Miquirray
- Starring: Adriana Paz
- Cinematography: Hatuey Viveros Lavielle
- Edited by: Rodrigo Ríos
- Music by: Alejandro Otaola
- Production companies: Albricias Producción; JP&K Films
- Distributed by: Mandarina Cine
- Release dates: March 10, 2024 (Cinequest); March 20, 2025 (Mexico)
- Running time: 108 minutes
- Country: Mexico
- Language: Spanish

Dead Man's Switch (Spanish: Arillo de hombre muerto, lit. 'Dead man's ring') is a 2024 Mexican melodrama film written, co-produced and directed by Alejandro Gerber Bicecci. It stars Adriana Paz as a Mexico City Metro driver who seeks to find her missing husband, dealing with the reprimands of Mexican bureaucracy, her work environment and her own family.

== Synopsis ==
Dalia discovers that her husband has disappeared without a trace. Her life, her job as a subway driver, her relationship with her two children, and her relationship with a lover are all crumbling amidst the hustle and bustle, suspicions, investigations, and constant re-victimization.

== Cast ==
- Adriana Paz as Dalia
- Noé Hernández as Carlos López
- Gina Morett as Marta
- Gabo Anguiano as Fabián
- Andrea Jimenez Camacho as Sonia
- Mariel Molino as Esther
- Ramón Medína as Fiscal
- Ángel Abad as Darío
- Antonio Alcantara as Undersecretary
- Andalucía as Makeup artist
- Zuadd Atala as Mother of missing person
- Baltimore Beltran as Ramón Medina
- Marcelo Cerón as Beaten boy
- Pilar Couto as Neighbor
- Rubén Cristiany as Don Martín
- Alejandro De la Rosa as Commander
- Surya MacGregor as Secretary of the Interior
- Miguel Ángel López as Mechanic 1
- Desiderio Däxuni as Mechanic 2
- Tomihuatzi Xelhuantzi as Mechanic 3
- Kimberly Escajadillo as Morgue staff
- Alejandro Guerrero as Elías
- Alberto Lomnitz as Foreman of mechanics
- Roberto Mares as Peasant on video
- Aldo Escalante Ochoa as Photographer Fede
- Norma Pablo as Caped Employee
- Evan Regueira as Documentalist
- Boris Schoemann as Mario Bernal
- Juan Carlos Terreros as Caped Employee

== Production ==
Principal photography lasted 29 days between September and October 2022 in Mexico.

== Release ==
The film had its world premiere on March 10, 2024, at the Cinequest Film & Creativity Festival, then screened on March 21, 2024, at the 38th Fribourg International Film Festival, on June 9, 2024, at the 39th Guadalajara International Film Festival, September 21, 2024, at the 16th Hola Mexico Film Festival, in December 2024 at the 45th Havana Film Festival, and on April 13, 2025, at the 33rd Arizona International Film Festival.

The film was commercially released on March 20, 2025, in Mexican theaters.

== Accolades ==
Year	Award / Festival	Category	Recipient	Result	Ref.
2024	39th Guadalajara International Film Festival	Mezcal Award - Best Film	Dead Man's Switch	Nominated	
2024	16th Hola Mexico Film Festival	Mexico Today - Best Full Feature Films	Dead Man's Switch	Nominated	
2024	30th Kolkata International Film Festival	Special Jury Award - International Section	Dead Man's Switch	Won	
2025	67th Ariel Awards	Best Actress	Adriana Paz	Nominated	
2025	67th Ariel Awards	Best Supporting Actor	Noé Hernández	Nominated	
