= Fiona Palomo =

American actress (born 1998)

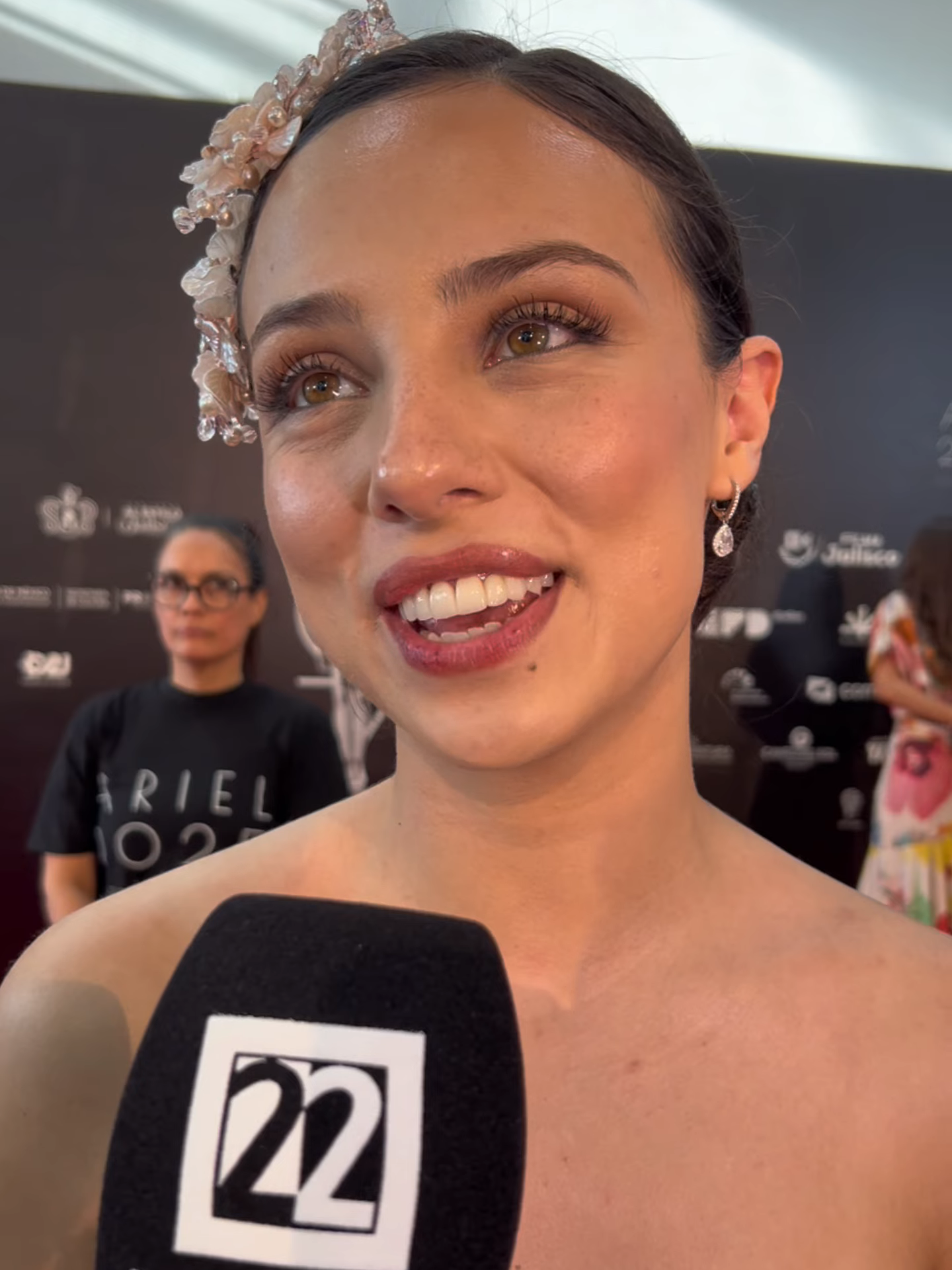
- Palomo at the 2025 Ariel Awards
- Born: Fiona Alexa Estrada; 12 October 1998 (age 27); Los Angeles, California, U.S.
- Other names: Fiona Palomo; Fiona Alexa Estrada Ricco
- Citizenship: United States; Mexico
- Occupations: Actress; singer
- Parents: Eduardo Palomo (father); Carina Ricco (mother)

Fiona Alexa Estrada (born 12 October 1998), known as Fiona Palomo, is an American actress and singer. She is known for her role as Sofia in the Netflix drama series Outer Banks (2023–2026).

== Life and career ==
Fiona Alexa Estrada was born on 12 October 1998 in Los Angeles, California to Mexican artists Eduardo Estrada Palomo and Carina Ricco. She holds dual citizenship with the United States and Mexico.

She made her television debut as an actress in Gossip Girl: Acapulco in 2013. She portrayed María Alexander in Control Z (2020), and Sofía Delgado in seasons 3, 4, and 5 of Outer Banks (2023-2026). She made her big screen debut in ¡Qué despadre! (2022), for which she won a "Silvia Pinal" Silver Goddess Award for Best New Actress. She starred in leading roles in film such as Mary in Journey to Bethlehem (2023), Sandra Navarro in Bad Actor (2023), and Vivi in El roomie (2024).

For her lead performance in the drama film Bad Actor, Palomo earned a nomination for the Ariel Award for Best Actress, Mexico's leading national film award, and won the Diosa de Plata for Best Actress, presented by Mexican cinema journalists. She will appear in Danny Ramirez's upcoming Sports film and directorial debut, Baton alongside cast Ramirez, Lewis Pullman, Diego Calva, Maia Reficco, Ester Expósito, Eugenio Derbez and Noah Beck.
