= Pedro Páramo (2024 film) =

- Netflix release poster
- Directed by: Rodrigo Prieto
- Screenplay by: Mateo Gil
- Based on: Pedro Páramo by Juan Rulfo
- Produced by: Stacy Perskie; Rafael Ley
- Starring: Manuel García Rulfo; Tenoch Huerta; Ilse Salas; Mayra Batalla; Héctor Kotsifakis; Roberto Sosa; Dolores Heredia; Giovanna Zacarías; Noé Hernández; Yoshira Escárrega
- Cinematography: Rodrigo Prieto; Nico Aguilar
- Edited by: Soledad Salfate
- Music by: Gustavo Santaolalla
- Production companies: Netflix; Redrum Production; Woo Films
- Distributed by: Netflix
- Release dates: September 7, 2024 (TIFF); September 12, 2024 (Mexico); November 6, 2024 (Netflix)
- Running time: 123 minutes
- Country: Mexico
- Language: Spanish

Pedro Páramo is a 2024 Mexican magical realism drama film directed by Rodrigo Prieto from a screenplay written by Mateo Gil, based on the 1955 novel by Juan Rulfo. It stars Manuel Garcia-Rulfo as the eponymous character and Tenoch Huerta as Juan Preciado.

Pedro Páramo had its world premiere at the 49th Toronto International Film Festival on 7 September 2024 in the Platform Prize section, and premiered worldwide on Netflix on 6 November 2024.

== Cast ==
- Manuel García Rulfo as Pedro Páramo
- Tenoch Huerta as Juan Preciado
- Dolores Heredia as Eduvigues
- Ilse Salas Susana San Juan
- Héctor Kotsifakis as Fulgor Sedano
- Mayra Batalla as Damiana
- Roberto Sosa as Reverend Renteria
- Giovanna Zacarías as Dorotea
- Ishbel Bautista as Dolores
- Noé Hernández
- Yoshira Escárrega

== Production ==
In August 2021, it was announced that Netflix was working on a feature adaptation of Pedro Páramo. In August 2022, it was announced that cinematographer Rodrigo Prieto was set to direct the film in his feature directorial debut, with Eugenio Caballero and Ana Terrazas joining as production designer and costume designer. In May 2023, it was announced that filming had begun on the film, with Manuel Garcia-Rulfo cast as the eponymous protagonist and Tenoch Huerta as Juan Preciado. It was also announced that Mateo Gil had penned the script. Gil was previously attached to write and direct the film in 2007, but that iteration of the project felt through. Other cast members included Ilse Salas, Mayra Batalla, Héctor Kotsifakis, Roberto Sosa, Dolores Heredia, Giovanna Zacarías, Noé Hernández and Yoshira Escárrega. Gustavo Santaolalla served as composer, Carlos Y. Jacques joined Caballero as production designer, and Nico Aguilar served as cinematographer alongside Prieto. Stacy Perskie of Redrum Production and Rafael Ley of Woo Films produced the film. Filming wrapped by August 2023, when the film entered post production.

== Release ==
Pedro Páramo had its world premiere on September 7, 2024, as part of the Platform section of the 49th Toronto International Film Festival, and then had a limited theatrical release in Mexico on September 12, 2024. It was released on Netflix on November 6, 2024.

== Reception ==
On the review aggregator website Rotten Tomatoes, 77% of 22 critics' reviews are positive, with an average rating of 5.8/10. Metacritic, which uses a weighted average, assigned the film a score of 57 out of 100, based on 9 critics, indicating "mixed or average" reviews.
