= A History of Love and War =

- Theatrical release poster
- Directed by: Santiago Mohar Volkow
- Written by: Santiago Mohar Volkow
- Produced by: Santiago de la Paz Nicolau; Santiago Dosal; Santiago Mohar Volkow; Jonathan Davis
- Starring: Andrew Leland Rogers
- Cinematography: Adrian Cores
- Edited by: Didac Palou
- Music by: Diego Lozano
- Production companies: Edge Films; Laredo17; Nomadas
- Distributed by: Videocine
- Release dates: January 31, 2024 (IFFR); October 2, 2025 (Mexico)
- Running time: 111 minutes
- Country: Mexico
- Language: Spanish

A History of Love and War (Spanish: Una historia de amor y guerra; it was later retitled as Una película de amor y guerra, lit. 'A film of love and war') is a 2024 Mexican postmodern satirical comedy film written, co-produced and directed by Santiago Mohar Volkow. It stars Andrew Leland Rogers as a real estate magnate who is kidnapped by a peasant guerrilla group before his wedding. It is loosely based on the execution of Maximilian I.

== Synopsis ==
Corrupt real estate magnate Pepe Sánchez-Campo, whose mega-mall is at odds with local guerrillas, is kidnapped by one of those groups before he is due to marry his cousin Constanza.

== Cast ==
The actors participating in this film are:

- Andrew Leland Rogers as Pepe Sánchez Campo
- Lucía Gómez-Robledo as Constaza
- Patricia Bernal as Lulú
- Hernan Del Riego as Luis
- Santiago Espejo as Jopa
- Manuel Garcia-Rulfo as Toño Muerte
- Sophie Gómez as Paty
- Maria Hinojos as Aranzazú
- Florencia Ríos as Queen
- Dario Yazbek Bernal as Teo
- Fernando Álvarez Rebeil as Lic. Ruvalcaba
- Mónica del Carmen as Justina Venganza
- José Carlos Illanes as Jopita's father
- Sharon Kleinberg as Bertita
- Sara Montalvo as Mila
- Aldo Escalante as Engels
- Teresa Sanchez as Abogada

== Release ==
The film had its world premiere on January 31, 2024, at the 53rd International Film Festival Rotterdam, then screened on June 14, 2024, at the 14th UNAM International Film Festival, on September 12, 2024, at the 31st Oldenburg International Film Festival, on October 10, 2024, at the 53rd Festival du nouveau cinéma, and on November 27, 2024, at the 39th Mar del Plata International Film Festival.

The film was commercially released on October 2, 2025, in Mexican theaters.

== Accolades ==
Year	Award / Festival	Category	Recipient	Result	Ref.
2024	31st Oldenburg International Film Festival	German Independence Award – Spirit of Cinema	A History of Love and War	Won	
2024	39th Mar del Plata International Film Festival	Best Film - International Competition	A History of Love and War	Nominated	
2025	67th Ariel Awards	Best Makeup	Fernanda Juárez, Ana Ximena Serrano Sierra	Nominated	
