= 39th Guadalajara International Film Festival =

2024 film festival

- Official poster by Tata Muciño.
- Opening film: This Excessive Ambition
- Closing film: Kinds of Kindness
- Location: Guadalajara, Mexico
- Awards: Mezcal Award: We Shall Not Be Moved; Best Ibero-American Film: Toll
- Festival date: June 7–15, 2024

Guadalajara International Film Festival
- 2025 2023

The 39th Guadalajara International Film Festival took place from June 7 to 15, 2024, in Guadalajara, Mexico. Spanish documentary film This Excessive Ambition served as the festival's opening film, screened at the opening ceremony at Telmex Auditorium. Directed by Santos Bacana, Rogelio González and Cristina Trenas, the film follows the tour Sin cantar ni afinar by Spanish rapper C. Tangana. Yorgos Lanthimos anthology film Kinds of Kindness was the closing film.

Pierre Saint Martin's We Shall Not Be Moved won the Mezcal Award for Best Film in the Mexican films section. Brazilian-Portuguese film Toll, directed by Carolina Markowicz, won Best Ibero-American Film, while Chilean-Dutch film The Fabulous Gold Harvesting Machine, directed by Alfredo Pourailly De La Plaza, won Best Ibero-American Documentary Film.

== Background ==
The Community of Madrid was chosen as the guest of honor for this year's edition. Spanish filmmaker Álex de la Iglesia and Spanish directing duo Los Javis (Javier Calvo and Javier Ambrossi) received the International Mayahuel Tribute and the Maguey Lifetime Achievement, respectively. Additionally, Chilean actor Alfredo Castro was honored with the Mayahuel Iberoamerican Tribute, Mexican filmmaker and actress Ángeles Cruz received the Maguey Activism Award, and Mexican actor Diego Luna received the Mayahuel Honorary Award (Mayahuel de Plata).

The festival was directed by Estrella Araiza, who took over the festival's direction from Raúl Padilla López, who served as president for the festival until his death in 2023. Padilla López was honored for his work during the festival's previous edition.

The festival's poster, featuring a woman surrounded by nopales, was designed by Mexican graphic designer and tattoo artist Tata Mucino, and was inspired by "the facial featured of Mexican women".

== Official selections ==
The following films were selected for the official competitions:

=== Mezcal Award ===
Highlighted title indicates section's best film winner.

English title	Original title	Director(s)	Production countrie(s)
After the Guns	Después de las armas	Héctor Alfonso Laso Machuca	Mexico
Corina (HeJ)		Urzula Barba Hopfner	Mexico
Children of the Coast	Los hijos de la costa	Bruno Bancalari	Mexico
Dead Man's Switch	Arillo de hombre muerto	Alejandro Gerber Bicecci	Mexico
Demons at Dawn (MG)	Los demonios del amanecer	Julián Hernández	Mexico
Después (MG, HeJ)		Sofía Gómez Córdova	Mexico
Jíkuri: Journey to the Land of the Tarahumara	Jíkuri: Viaje al país de los Tarahumaras	Federico Cecchetti	Mexico, United States, France
Lachatao		Natalia Bruschtein Erenberg	Mexico
Shame	Vergüenza	Miguel Salgado Parra	Mexico
State of Silence	Estado de silencio	Santiago Maza	Mexico
The Invisible Contract	Tratado de invisibilidad	Luciana Kaplan	Mexico
The Muleteer (MG, HeJ)	La arriera	Isabel Cristina Fregoso	Mexico
The Weavers' Songs	Hilando sones	Ismael Vásquez Bernabé	Mexico
We Shall Not Be Moved	No nos moverán	Pierre Saint Martin	Mexico

(MG) indicates eligible for the Maguey Award, for films that include LGBTQ+ themes.
(HeJ) indicates film eligible for the Hecho en Jalisco Award.

=== Ibero-American Fiction Feature Film ===
Highlighted title indicates section's best film winner.

English title	Original title	Director(s)	Production countrie(s)
Creatura		Elena Martín Gimeno	Spain
Delirio		Alexandra Latishev Salazar	Costa Rica, Chile
I Saw Three Black Lights	Yo vi tres luces negras	Santiago Lozano Álvarez	Colombia, Mexico, France, Germany
Natural Phenomena	Fenómenos naturales	Marcos Díaz Sosa	Cuba, Argentina, France
Prison in the Andes	Penal Cordillera	Felipe Carmona	Chile, Brazil
Saturn Return (MG)	Segundo premio	Isaki Lacuesta, Pol Rodríguez	Spain, France
Seaside Avenue	Avenida Beira-Mar	Bernardo Florim, Maju de Paiva	Brazil
The Dog Thief (MIT)	El ladrón de perros	Vinko Tomičić Salinas	Bolivia, Chile, Mexico, Ecuador, France, Italy
The Other Way Around	Volveréis	Jonás Trueba	Spain, France
Toll (MG)	Pedágio	Carolina Markowicz	Brazil, Portugal
You Burn Me (MG)	Tú me abrasas	Matías Piñeiro	Argentina, Spain

(MG) indicates eligible for the Maguey Award, for films that include LGBTQ+ themes.
(MIT) indicates film also screened as a part of the Mayahuel Iberoamerican Tribute, presented to Alfredo Castro.

=== Ibero-American Documentary Feature Film ===
Highlighted title indicates section's best film winner.

English title	Original title	Director(s)	Production countrie(s)
Carropasajero		Juan Pablo Polanco, César Jaimes	Colombia, Germany
I Am Here	Estou aqui	Dorian Rivière, Zsófia Paczolay	Portugal
Nights Gone By (GH)	Antier noche	Alberto Martín Menacho	Switzerland, Spain
Ozogoche		Joseph Albert Houlberg Silva	Ecuador, Belgium, Qatar
Souls	Las almas	Laura Basombrío	Argentina
Stay Still	Quédate quieto	Joanna Lombardi Pollarolo	Peru, Uruguay, Netherlands
Still Stares	Otra piel	Patricia Correa Cofré	Chile, Colombia
The Fabulous Gold Harvesting Machine	La fabulosa máquina de cosechar oro	Alfredo Pourailly De La Plaza	Chile, Netherlands
The Undergrowth	La hojarasca	Macu Machín	Spain
Cyborg Generation		Miguel Morrillo Vega	Spain

(GH) indicates film also screened as a part of the Madrid, Guest of Honor section.

=== Ibero-American Short Film ===
Highlighted title indicates section's best film winner.

English title	Original title	Director(s)	Production countrie(s)
A Rosa Nasce Nas Pedras		Sebastian Molina Ruiz	Portugal, Mexico, Belgium, Hungary
Blow!		Neus Ballús	Spain
Chapter 4: Beneath the Waves	Naiki weeria. Ka gotti ba´a betuk luula	Zyanya López Arámburo	Mexico
Cielo roto		Daniela Natacha Mora Villalobos	Costa Rica
Elevation (HeJ)	Elevación	Gabriel Esdras Hernandez Morales	Mexico
Longing for Light	Alhel de llum	Alba Cros Pellisé	Spain
Looks Bad	Mala facha	Ilén Juambeltz	Uruguay, Brazil
Moon Belly	Vientre de luna	Liliana K'an	Mexico
Ode to Ghosts	Elogio a los fantasmas	Facundo Rodríguez Alonso	Argentina
She Stays	Ella se queda	Marinthia Gutiérrez	Mexico
The Canon	El canon	Martín Seeger	Chile
The Cascade	La cascada	Pablo Delgado Sánchez	Mexico
The Custodian	El custodio	Arturo Franco	Spain, Cuba
The Divine Calling	El oficio divino	Maria Lorena Lisotti	Mexico
The Howl of the Furies	El turno de la aullante	Bayron Norman	Mexico
The Masterpiece	La gran obra	Álex Lora	Spain
The Night Inside	La noche dentro	Antonio Cuesta	Spain
When Everything Burns	Cuando todo arde	María Belén Poncio	Argentina, United States
Panadrilo		Marcela Heilbron	Panama
Passarinho		Natalia Garcia Agraz	Mexico
Pesudo		Miquel Díaz Pont	Spain
Spiritum		José Adolfo Margulis Noriega	Mexico
Those Next to Us		Bernhard Hetzenauer	Mexico, Austria, Germany, Switzerland

(HeJ) indicates film eligible for the Hecho en Jalisco Award.

=== Maguey Award ===
The following list consists of the films eligible for the Maguey Award that are not listed in the previous competition tables. The films in contention for both the Maguey Award and other competition section appear with the symbol (MG) next to it.

English title	Original title	Director(s)	Production countrie(s)
Crossing		Levan Akin	Sweden, Denmark, France, Türkiye, Georgia
Desire Lines		Jules Rosskam	United States
Light Light Light	Valoa valoa valoa	Inari Niemi	Finland
Neon Purple (HeJ)	Púrpura neón	Lex Renteria	Mexico
Sebastian		Mikko Mäkelä	United Kingdom
Sentinel's Heart (HeJ)	Corazón de centinela	Sergio Rosales, Andoeni Padilla, Alejandro de la Torre	Mexico
Teaches of Peaches		Judy Landkammer, Philipp Fussenegger	Germany
The Astronaut Lovers	Los amantes astronautas	Marco Berger	Argentina, Spain
The Silence of My Hands (HeJ)	El silencio de mis manos	Manuel Acuña Arellano	Mexico
The Visitor		Bruce LaBruce	United Kingdom
Woman Of...	Kobieta z...	Małgorzata Szumowska, Michał Englert	Poland, Sweden

(HeJ) indicates film eligible for the Hecho en Jalisco Award.

=== Hecho en Jalisco ===
The following list consists of the films eligible for the Hecho en Jalisco that are not listed in the previous competition tables. The films in contention for both the Made in Jalisco and other competition section appear with the symbol (HeJ) next to it.

Highlighted title indicates section's best film winner.

English title	Original title	Director(s)	Production countrie(s)
604-A Bus	Ruta 604-A	Daniel Vega	Mexico
A Mexican on the Moon	Un mexicano en la Luna	José Luis Yáñez López, Francis Levy Lavalle	Mexico, Italy
Concerto for Other Hands	Concierto para otras manos	Ernesto González Díaz	Mexico
Good Savage	Buen salvaje	Santiago Mohar Volkow	Mexico
INGRITO, A Night with Café Tacvba	INGRITO, una noche con Café Tacvba	Alejandro Tavares López	Mexico
Misoshop	Misocompra	Andrea Ro Riggen	Mexico
Night Trip	Noche de viaje	Arleth Gutiérrez	Mexico
The Dog's Highway	La carretera de los perros	Carlos Rueda	Mexico
The Family's Son	Hijo de familia	Rafa Lara	Mexico
Bumbumpapá		Alexis Gómez	Mexico
Sisters		Mar Novo	Mexico
Devotion		Jonatan Guzmán Reynoso	Mexico

=== Socio-Environmental Cinema Award ===
The following list consists of the films eligible for the Socio-Environmental Cinema Award that are not listed in the previous competition tables. The films in contention for both the Socio-Environmental Cinema Award and other competition section appear with the symbol (SE) next to it.

Highlighted title indicates section's best film winner.

English title	Original title	Director(s)	Production countrie(s)
Rising Up at Night	Tongo Saa	Nelson Makengo	Democratic Republic of Congo, Belgium, Germany, Burkina Faso, Qatar
The Last	Los últimos	Sebastián Peña Escobar	Paraguay, Uruguay, France
Wild, Wild	Salvaxe, Salvaxe	Emilio Fonseca Martín	Spain
The Battle for Laikipia		Peter Murimi, Daphne Matziaraki	Kenya, United States
Betânia		Marcelo Botta	Brazil

=== International Animation Feature Film ===
Highlighted title indicates section's best film winner.

English title	Original title	Director(s)	Production countrie(s)
Sultana's Dream	El sueño de la sultana	Isabel Herguera	Spain, Germany, India
Tender Metalheads	Heavies tendres	Joan Tomàs Monfort, Carlos Pérez-Reche, Juanjo Sáez Domper	Spain
Fox and Hare Save the Forest	Vos & Haas redden het bos	Mascha Halberstad	Netherlands, Belgium, Luxembourg
Flow		Gints Zilbalodis	Latvia, France, Belgium
The Glassworker	شیشہ گر	Usman Riaz	Pakistan

=== Rigo Mora Award ===
Highlighted title indicates section's best film winner.

English title	Original title	Director(s)	Production countrie(s)
A Crab in the Pool	Un trou dans la poitrine	Jean-Sébastien Hamel, Alexandra Myotte	Canada
Cold Soup	Sopa fría	Marta Monteiro	Portugal, France
Duck	Canard	Elie Chapuis	Switzerland, Belgium
Flesh Out	Prends chair	Armin Assadipour	France
In the Shadow of the Cypress	Dar Saaye Sarv	Hossein Molayemi, Shirin Sohani	Iran
Peeping Mom	Le sexe de ma mère	Francis Canitrot	France
Harvey		Janice Nadeau	Canada, France
El ombligo de la luna (HeJ)		Sara Lourenço António, Julia Grupińska, Ezequiel Garibay, Bokang Koatja, Tian Westraad	France
Percebes		Alexandra Ramires, Laura Gonçalves	Portugal, France
The Family Portrait		Lea Vidakovic	Croatia, France, Serbia
Dolores (HeJ)		Cecilia Andalon	Mexico
Wander to Wonder		Nina Gantz	Netherlands, Belgium, France
Fox Tossing		Zénó Mira	Hungary
Beautiful Men		Nicolas Keppens	Belgium
Minus Plus Multiply		Chu-Chieh Lee	United Kingdom
Flatastic		Alice Saey	France, Netherlands

(HeJ) indicates film eligible for the Hecho en Jalisco Award.

== Other sections ==
=== Special Screenings ===
English title	Original title	Director(s)	Production countrie(s)
Dying Briefly	Seré breve al momento de morir	Juan Briseño	Mexico
Night Box	Noite	Paula Gaitán	Brazil
Sur sonido negro		Tin Dirdamal	Mexico, Kosovo, Albania
The Craft of Building, Raúl Padilla López	El oficio de construir, Raúl Padilla López	Gabriel Torres, Gabriel Santander	Mexico
The Exchange	El intercambio	Marco Berger	Argentina, Puerto Rico, Uruguay
The Shadow of Catire	La sombra del Catire	Jorge Hernandez Aldana	Mexico, Venezuela
Wake Up Mom	Despierta Mamá	Arianne Benedetti	Panama

=== Tribute Screenings ===
English title	Original title	Director(s)	Production countrie(s)
Madrid, Guest of Honor
Birth	Alumbramiento	Pau Teixidor	Spain
Contigo, contigo y sin mí		Amaya Villar Navascués	Spain
Eyes of the Soul: Cristina García Rodero	Cristina García Rodero: La mirada oculta	Carlota Nelson	Spain
Hispanoamérica, Song of Life and Hope	Hispanoamérica, canto de vida y esperanza	José Luis López-Linares	Spain
Lola, Lolita, Lolaza		Mabel Lozano	Spain
Madrid		Basilio Martín Patino	Spain
Madrid, 1987		David Trueba	Spain
Moro		Pablo Barce	Spain
Piggy	Cerdita	Carlota Pereda	Spain, France
The Crime of Cuenca	El crimen de Cuenca	Pilar Miró	Spain
This Excessive Ambition (opening film)	Esta ambición desmedida	Rogelio González, Santos Bacana, Cris Trenas	Spain
Urban	Céntrico	Luso Martínez	Spain
Women on the Verge of a Nervous Breakdown (MG)	Mujeres al borde de un ataque de nervios	Pedro Almodóvar	Spain
Honorary Award: Diego Luna
Abel		Diego Luna	Mexico
Mister Lonely		Harmony Korine	United Kingdom, France, Ireland, United States
Y tu mamá también		Alfonso Cuarón	Mexico
Maguey Lifetime Achievement: Los Javis
Holy Camp!	La llamada	Javier Calvo, Javier Ambrossi	Spain
Industry Tribute: Enrique Cerezo
Stories of Our Cinema	Historias de nuestro cine	Ana Pérez-Lorente, Antonio Resines	Spain

(MG) indicates eligible for the Maguey Award, for films that include LGBTQ+ themes.

=== Series Showcase ===
English title	Original title	Director(s)	Production countrie(s)
The Black Files, Shadows of Crime	Archivo negro, sombras del crimen	Emiliano Altuna	Mexico
Toast for Two	Dos de copas	Érick Virgen	Mexico

=== Imagenes Restauradas ===
English title	Original title	Director(s)	Production countrie(s)
In the Times of Don Porfirio (1939)	En tiempos de Don Porfirio	Juan Bustillo Oro	Mexico
El Norte (1984)		Gregory Nava	United States, Mexico
Amok (1944)		Antonio Momplet	Mexico
Nazarín (1959)		Luis Buñuel	Mexico

=== Doculab ===
English title	Original title	Director(s)	Production countrie(s)
A Street Named Cuba	Calle Cuba entre Sol y Amargura	Vanessa Batista, Guillermo Barbera	Cuba, Spain, Chile
Errant	Errante	Sofía Betarte	Uruguay, Brazil
Here, the Silence is Heard	Aquí se escucha el silencio	Picho García, Gabriela Pena	Chile, Spain
Sister	Manita	Andrés Acevedo Zuleta	Colombia
Olimpia		Indira Cato	Mexico
Brujas		Andrea Ro Riggen	Mexico

=== International Panorama ===
English title	Original title	Director(s)	Production countrie(s)
Meanwhile on Earth	Pendant ce temps sur Terre	Jéremy Clapin	France
Silence of Reason		Kumjana Novakova	North Macedonia, Bosnia and Herzegovina
No Other Land		Yuval Abraham, Rachel Szor, Hamdan Ballal, Basel Adra	Norway, Palestine

=== Guadalajara Construye ===
English title	Original title	Director(s)	Production countrie(s)
#300 Letters	#300 cartas	Lucas Santa Ana	Argentina, United Kingdom
Knot	Nó	Laís Melo	Brazil
Once Upon a Time in Cordisburgo	Era uma vez em Cordisburgo	Marco Antonio Pereira	Brazil
Raya	La raya	Yolanda Cruz	Mexico
The Seamstress	La costurera	Daniel Rodríguez Risco	Peru
The Wig	La peluca	Emiliano Rocha Minter	Mexico
Tribes	Tribus	Gory Patiño	Bolivia

=== Cinema Libre ===
English title	Original title	Director(s)	Production countrie(s)
Deep Reverence (2023)		Jenise Whitehead	United States
El Maestro. Benjamín Galindo's Film (2024)	El Maestro. La película de Benjamín Galindo	Gonzalo Lamela	Uruguay, Mexico
Elis and Tom (2022)	Elis e Tom	Roberto de Oliveira, Jom Tob Azulay	Brazil
Family Mixtape (2023)		Keith Nixon Jr.	United States
Fatfish (2023)		Jewells Santos	United States
I Can't Go On Like This (2023)		Aria Covamonas	Mexico
In the Garden of Tulips (2023)		Julia Elihu	United States
Metal Belt (2023)		Blackhorse Lowe	United States
Mogwai: If the Stars Had a Sound (2024)		Antony Crook	United Kingdom
Omar + Cedric: If This Ever Gets Weird (2023)		Nicolas Jack Davies	Germany, United States
Skin (2023)		Leo Behrens	United States
Spontaneous Generation: 10 Years of Design in Mexico (2021)	Generación espontánea: 10 años de diseño en México	Gustavo Castillo Alemán	Mexico
The Book of Life (2014)		Jorge R. Gutierrez	United States
This is a Film About the Black Keys (2024)		Jeff Dupre	United States
Você Means You (2023)		Mahyar Mandegar	United States

== Official awards ==
The following awards were given:

=== Mezcal Awards ===
- Best Film: We Shall Not Be Moved by Pierre Saint Martin
- Best Directing: Isabel Cristina Fregoso for The Muleteer
- Best Performance: Juan Ramón López for Shame
- Best Cinematography: María Sarasvati Herrera for The Muleteer

=== Ibero-American Fiction Feature Film ===
- Best Film: Toll by Carolina Markowicz
- Special Mention: The Other Way Around by Jonás Trueba
- Best Directing: Bernardo Florim & Maju de Paiva for Seaside Avenue
- Best Performance: Maeve Jinkings for Toll
- Best Screenplay: Fernando del Razo & Santiago Lozano Álvarez for I Saw Three Black Lights
- Best Cinematography: Juan Velásquez for I Saw Three Black Lights
- Best First Film: Natural Phenomena by Marcos Díaz Sosa
- Special Mention for New Actor: Franklin Aro Huasco for The Dog Thief

=== Ibero-American Documentary Film ===
- Best Film: The Fabulous Gold Harvesting Machine by Alfredo Pourailly de la Plaza
- Best Directing: Macu Machín for The Undergrowth
- Best Cinematography: Laura Basombrío for Souls

=== Maguey Award ===
- Best Film: Toll by Carolina Markowicz
- Special Jury Prize: Crossing by Levan Akin
- Special Mention: Seaside Avenue by Bernardo Florim & Maju de Paiva
- Best Performance: The cast of The Astronaut Lovers

=== Animated Film ===
- Best Animated Feature Film: Flow by Gints Zilbalodis
- Special Mention: Tender Metalheads by Juanjo Sáez, Carlos Pérez-Reche & Joan Tomás Monfort

=== Rigo Mora Award ===
- Best Animated Short Film: The Family Portrait by Lea Vidakovic
- Special Mention: Percebes by Alexandra Ramires & Laura Gonçalves

=== Hecho en Jalisco ===
- Best Film: Corina by Urzula Barba Hopfner
- Best Short Film: Bumbumpapá by Alexis Gómez
- Special Mention for Best Short Film: The Dog's Highway by Carlos Rueda

=== Socio-Environmental Cinema Award ===
- Best Film: The Battle for Laikipia by Peter Murimi & Daphne Matziaraki
- Special Mention:
  - Wild, Wild by Emilio Fonseca Martín
  - Rising Up at Night by Nelson Makengo

=== Young Jury ===
- Best Film: The Invisible Contract by Luciana Kaplan
- Special Mention for Best Performance: Luisa Huertas for We Shall Not Be Moved

=== Audience Award ===
- Audience Award: We Shall Not Be Moved by Pierre Saint Martin

== Independent awards ==
=== FIPRESCI Awards ===
- Best Film: The Invisible Contract by Luciana Kaplan

=== FEISAL Awards ===
- Best Film: The Fabulous Gold Harvesting Machine by Alfredo Pourailly de la Plaza
- Special Mention for Best Film:
  - Shame by Miguel Salgado Parra
  - We Shall Not Be Moved by Pierre Saint Martin

=== Other ===
- Latin American Critics' Award for European Films: The Teachers' Lounge by İlker Çatak
