= La cocina =

- Mexican theatrical release poster
- Directed by: Alonso Ruizpalacios
- Screenplay by: Alonso Ruizpalacios
- Based on: The Kitchen by Arnold Wesker
- Produced by: Alonso Ruizpalacios; Lauren Mann; Gerardo Gatica González; Ivan Orlic; Ramiro Ruiz
- Starring: Raúl Briones; Rooney Mara; Anna Díaz; Motell Foster; Eduardo Olmos; Oded Fehr; Spenser Granese; Soundos Mosbah
- Cinematography: Juan Pablo Ramirez
- Edited by: Yibran Asuad
- Music by: Tomás Barreiro
- Production companies: Fifth Season; Seine Pictures; Astrakan Film AB; Filmadora; Panorama Global
- Distributed by: Willa (United States); Cinépolis Distribución (Mexico)
- Release dates: February 16, 2024 (Berlinale); October 25, 2024 (United States); November 7, 2024 (Mexico)
- Running time: 139 minutes
- Countries: Mexico; United States
- Languages: English; Spanish
- Box office: $249,115

La cocina (Spanish for 'The Kitchen') is a 2024 comedy-drama film written and directed by Alonso Ruizpalacios. The film elaborates on the theme and style of Ruizpalacios' early short Café Paraíso (2008) and is based on the 1957 stage play The Kitchen by Arnold Wesker, which was already adapted to the 1961 film The Kitchen. However, while in the play and the British film the kitchen staff were continental European immigrants, in the present film they are mostly Latin Americans with some Arabs. The film stars Raúl Briones, Rooney Mara, Soundos Mosbah, Anna Díaz, Motell Foster, Oded Fehr, Eduardo Olmos and Spenser Granese.

La cocina had its world premiere at the 74th Berlin International Film Festival on February 16, 2024, and was released in the United States by Willa on October 25, 2024.

== Plot ==
Rashid, a successful Arab American entrepreneur, runs "The Grill", a large upscale Times Square tourist trap. The kitchen, located underground, is staffed by undocumented immigrants, mostly Latin Americans with some Arabs, who must work at breakneck speed in the rush hours to fulfill the orders brought to them by the waitresses who are predominantly white Americans. Rashid regularly promises to obtain for the cooks a legal status in the US, but fails to act on such promises.

Estela, a newly arrived Hispanic immigrant who does not speak English, comes to work in The Grill as she knows Pedro, one of the cooks, and gets introduced at record speed to its staff and the restaurant's rough ways. Pedro, a charming, hot-tempered Mexican cook, and his girlfriend Julia, one of the waitresses, quarrel over their relationship, with some accusing Pedro of dating Julia only to get his visa. Relationships between Hispanics and "Gringos", and specifically, between male Latin American immigrants and female "Gringas", are a constant subject in the conversations of the kitchen staff.

Julia is pregnant and determined to get an abortion while Pedro, deeply in love with Julia, wants her to keep the child and engages in a fantasy of the two of them running away to an unspoiled beach in Mexico, where his son could run free on the shore. However, Pedro does get her the money needed for the abortion and she eventually goes through with it, alone.

After an incredibly tense first shift, where a broken soda machine causes the kitchen to flood, the employees take their break. When asked about their dreams by Pedro, Nonzo, the dessert cook, tells a strange story of an handicapped immigrant who was touched twice by a "green light", the first time saving him from deportation. When asked about the second encounter, Nonzo says he doesn't know what he was saying.

During another shift, Pedro gets in trouble; first for responding violently to a provocation by a fellow cook, then for generously giving to a hungry homeless vagrant one of the restaurant's treasured lobsters. To cap it all, $823 in cash is reported to have disappeared from a restaurant register, and Pedro is suspected of being the thief as it amounts to the cost of Julia's abortion. Eventually, the lost money is discovered under a desk and it turns out there was no theft.

Weakened after her abortion, Julia faints in the kitchen, and Pedro is shocked to discover that Julia had concealed from him the fact that she is already a mother, raising the ten year old Abe alone. Enraged, Pedro becomes unhinged after an altercation with a waitress, embarking on a wild rampage in both the underground kitchen and the plush restaurant upstairs, overturning tables, destroying equipment and bringing the restaurant to a standstill. When Rashid confronts Pedro, he remains silent, covered in an eerie green light that also engulfs Estela.

== Cast ==
- Raúl Briones Carmona as Pedro
- Rooney Mara as Julia
- Anna Díaz as Estela
- Soundos Mosbah as Samira
- Eduardo Olmos as Luis
- Motell Foster as Nonz
- Oded Fehr as Rashid
- Laura Gómez as Laura
- James Waterston as Mark
- Lee Sellars as Chef
- Spenser Granese as Max
- Julia Haltigan as Trisha

== Production ==
In April 2022, it was announced Rooney Mara had joined the cast of the film, with Alonso Ruizpalacios directing from a screenplay he wrote.

Principal photography took place in Mexico City.

== Release ==
It had its world premiere in Competition at the 74th Berlin International Film Festival on February 16, 2024. In August 2024, it was announced Willa would distribute the film in the United States on October 25, 2024. Cinépolis Distribución scheduled a November 7, 2024 theatrical bow in Mexico.

== Reception ==
On the review aggregator website Rotten Tomatoes, 72% of 60 critics' reviews are positive, with an average rating of 6.7/10.

Robert Daniels of RogerEbert.com called the film "a monumental work of righteous anger" that "aims at the grinding, chewing machinery of not only the American dream but the remnant of the failed egalitarian promise of the industrial commerce". The Hollywood Reporter's David Rooney wrote "There's a surging life force felt in every scene of Alonso Ruizpalacios' superbly acted La Cocina — at times ebullient but more often on edge, if not careening dangerously toward disaster or violence". IndieWire's David Ehrlich gave the film a B, writing, "The more that La Cocina alternates between operatic long-takes and grease-stained close-ups, the more you can feel its characters fighting to retain their souls in the face of a parable that’s eager to cast them as collateral damage". In a more critical review, Screen International's Lee Marshall wrote "This constant striving for symbolic import sums up the issues of a maximalist drama that is full of drive, ideas and ambition, but charts no satisfying dramatic arc, and too often feels simply strident".

== Accolades ==
The film was selected in Competition at the 74th Berlin International Film Festival, thus it was nominated to compete for Golden Bear award.

Award	Date	Category	Recipient	Result	Ref.
Berlin International Film Festival	February 25, 2024	Golden Bear	Alonso Ruizpalacios	Nominated	
Independent Spirit Awards	February 22, 2025	Best Director	Alonso Ruizpalacios	Nominated	
Independent Spirit Awards	February 22, 2025	Independent Spirit Award for Best Cinematography	Juan Pablo Ramírez	Nominated	
Ariel Awards	September 20, 2025	Best Picture	La cocina	Nominated	
Ariel Awards	September 20, 2025	Best Director	Alonso Ruizpalacios	Nominated	
Ariel Awards	September 20, 2025	Best Actress	Rooney Mara	Nominated	
Ariel Awards	September 20, 2025	Best Actor	Raúl Briones	Won	
Ariel Awards	September 20, 2025	Best Supporting Actor	Eduardo Olmos	Nominated	
Ariel Awards	September 20, 2025	Best Cinematography	Juan Pablo Ramírez	Nominated	
Ariel Awards	September 20, 2025	Best Adapted Screenplay	Alonso Ruizpalacios	Won	
Ariel Awards	September 20, 2025	Best Original Score	Tomás Barreiro	Won	
Ariel Awards	September 20, 2025	Best Sound	Javier Umpierrez, Isabel Muñoz Cota, Michelle Couttolenc, Jaime Baksht	Won	
Ariel Awards	September 20, 2025	Best Editing	Yibrán Asuad	Won	
Ariel Awards	September 20, 2025	Best Art Direction	Sandra Cabriada	Nominated	
Ariel Awards	September 20, 2025	Best Makeup	Itzel Peña García	Nominated	
Ariel Awards	September 20, 2025	Best Costume Design	Adela Cortázar	Nominated	
Ariel Awards	September 20, 2025	Best Special Effects	Gregorio Vega	Nominated	
Ariel Awards	September 20, 2025	Best Visual Effects	Raúl Luna	Nominated	
