= Párvulos: Children of the Apocalypse =

- Theatrical release poster
- Directed by: Isaac Ezban
- Screenplay by: Isaac Ezban
- Story by: Ricardo Aguado-Fentanes
- Produced by: Natalia Contreras; Isaac Ezban; Eduardo Lecuona; Javier Sepulveda
- Starring: Farid Escalante; Mateo Ortega; Leonardo Cervantes
- Cinematography: Rodrigo Sandoval
- Edited by: Oscar Figueroa
- Music by: Edy Lan; Camilla Uboldi
- Production companies: Maligno Gorehouse; Red Elephant Films
- Release dates: August 28, 2024 (Fantasia); November 7, 2024 (Mexico)
- Running time: 118 minutes
- Country: Mexico
- Language: Spanish

Párvulos: Children of the Apocalypse (Spanish: Párvulos: Hijos del apocalipsis) is a 2024 Mexican post-apocalyptic horror film written, co-produced and directed by Isaac Ezban. It stars Farid Escalante, Mateo Ortega and Leonardo Cervantes. It follows three children who must face an infection that has transformed COVID-19 patients into zombies.

== Synopsis ==
Salvador, Benjamin, and Oliver are three brothers trying to survive in a post-apocalyptic world infested with zombies caused by a faulty COVID-19 cure. Their refuge is a house in the middle of the forest, where they live together and adapt to a life where everyone protects each other. However, situations outside and unexpected threats will cause a dark and disturbing secret the three are hiding in the basement to come to light.

== Cast ==
- Farid Escalante as Salvador
- Mateo Ortega as Benjamin
  - Tito Onofre Andrade Racenis as Benjamin Age 5
- Leonardo Cervantes as Oliver
- Carla Adell as Valeria
- Norma Flores as Mama
- Noé Hernández as Enoc
- Omar Karim as Chained Infected Man
- Horacio F. Lazo as Father
- Efrain Rosas Léono as Man With a Gutted Heart
- Juan Carlos Remolina as Rogelio
- Marco Rodríguez as Psychopath 1
- Emilio Galvan as Psychopath 2
- Jason Luis Rodríguez as Psychopath 3

== Release ==
The film had its world premiere on July 28, 2024, at the 28th Fantasia International Film Festival, then screened on September 7, 2024, at the 38th Fantasy Filmfest, on September 26, 2024, at the 16th Hola Mexico Film Festival, on September 27, 2024, at the 25th Calgary International Film Festival, on September 28, 2024, at the Philadelphia Unnamed Film Festival Párvulos, on September 29, 2024, at the 43rd Vancouver International Film Festival, on October 5, 2024, at the 57th Sitges Film Festival, and on October 19, 2024, at the 22nd Morelia International Film Festival.

The film was released commercially on November 7, 2024, in Mexican theaters.

== Reception ==
=== Critical reception ===
On the review aggregator website Rotten Tomatoes, 88% of 40 critics' reviews are positive.

=== Accolades ===
Year	Award	Category	Nominee(s)	Result	Ref.
2024	28th Fantasia International Film Festival	Cheval Noir - Best Film	Párvulos: Children of the Apocalypse	Nominated	
2025	67th Ariel Awards	Best Makeup	Roberto Ortiz, Ana Flores	Nominated	
2025	67th Ariel Awards	Best Special Effects	Yoshiro Hernández	Nominated	
2025	67th Ariel Awards	Best Visual Effects	Leo Carrillo	Nominated	
