= Technoboys =

- Theatrical release poster
- Directed by: Gerardo Gatica; Luis Gerardo Méndez
- Written by: Alexandro Aldrete
- Produced by: Pablo Zimbrón Alva; Gerardo Gatica; Iván Gutiérrez Araico
- Starring: Luis Gerardo Méndez
- Cinematography: Emiliano Villanueva
- Edited by: Yibran Asuad
- Music by: Pablo Chemor
- Production companies: Agencia Bengala; Cine Vaquero; Panorama Global
- Distributed by: Netflix
- Release dates: September 5, 2024 (Mexico); September 11, 2024 (Netflix)
- Running time: 110 minutes
- Country: Mexico
- Language: Spanish

Technoboys is a 2024 Mexican satirical musical comedy film directed by Gerardo Gatica and Luis Gerardo Méndez (in his directorial debut) and written by Alexandro Aldrete. It stars Méndez accompanied by Karla Souza, Gabriel Nuncio, Daniela Vega, Fernando Bonilla, Joaquín Ferreira, Luis Rodríguez "El Guana", Ari Brickman, Vin Ramos, Germán Bracco, Mónica del Carmen and Fernanda Castillo. It follows the return of Technoboys, a forgotten Mexican boy band from the 90s.

== Synopsis ==
Twenty years after dominatin the charts, the boy band Technoboys returns to the stage to reclaim their throne in the ruthless world of pop. But on their path to success, they will have to confront a changing world they barely understand: the dreaded cancellation, the return of the techno-merengue band that are their sworn enemies, and the hidden agenda of vocalist Alan, who only wants to win back singer Melena.

== Cast ==
The actors participating in this film are:

- Luis Gerardo Méndez as Alan
  - Bernardo De Paula como Alan's voice
- Karla Souza as Melena
- Gabriel Nuncio as George
- Daniela Vega as Charlize
- Fernando Bonilla as Freddy
  - Demetrio Bonilla as Young Freddy
- Joaquín Ferreira as Leo
- Luis Rodríguez "El Guana" as Babyface
- Ari Brickman as Masiosare
- Vin Ramos as Juan
- Germán Bracco as Jay
- Mónica del Carmen as Yanetín
- Fernanda Castillo as Coquis Topete
- Paola Fernandez as Aguacero

== Release ==
The film had a limited theatrical release on September 5, 2024, in Mexican theaters, then premiered worldwide on September 11 of the same year on Netflix.

== Accolades ==
Year	Award / Festival	Category	Recipient	Result	Ref.
2025	67th Ariel Awards	Best Costume Design	Mariestela Peckinpah	Nominated	
