= Tell Me About Yourself =

- Theatrical release poster
- Spanish: Háblame de ti
- Directed by: Eduardo Cortés
- Written by: Eduardo Cortés
- Produced by: Candy Alvarado; Jesús Magaña Vázquez
- Starring: Germán Bracco; Martín Saracho; Arcelia Ramírez; Julio Bracho
- Cinematography: Julio Llorente
- Edited by: Luis Arturo Cárdenas; Carlos Espinoza
- Music by: Diego Lozano
- Production company: Sobrevivientes Films
- Release date: October 6, 2022
- Running time: 90 minutes
- Country: Mexico
- Language: Spanish

Tell Me About Yourself (Spanish: Háblame de ti) is a 2022 Mexican coming-of-age comedy-drama film written and directed by Eduardo Cortés in his directorial debut. Starring Germán Bracco, Martín Saracho, Arcelia Ramírez and Julio Bracho. It premiered on October 6, 2022 in Mexican theaters.

== Synopsis ==
Chava is a 17-year-old teenager who is single, one day he receives a message from a secret admirer who calls herself "Brujita" asking him to meet in person, on his way to meet her he discovers a series of secrets from his family, at the same time, he begins to find himself after meeting Carlos.

== Cast ==
The actors participating in this film are:

- Germán Bracco as Chava
- Martín Saracho as Carlos
- Arcelia Ramírez as Laura
- Julio Bracho as Álvaro
- Isidora Vives as Mariana
- Renata Vaca as Renata
- Isabella Argudín as Hannah
- Victor Hugo Villanueva as Hugo
- Hugo Catalán as Marco
- Daniela Schmidt as Maca
- Diego Alfonso as Witness
- Fernanda Borches as Bertha
- Angel Noe Alvarado as Fran
- Emiliano Estrada as Ramón
- Héctor Trejo as Bruno

== Production ==
Tell Me About Yourself was financed by the Program for the Promotion of Mexican Cinema (Focine). Principal photography began at the end of 2021 in Guanajuato, La Mina de Guadalupe and the alleys of the state capital.

== Reception ==
=== Critical reception ===
Irving Torres Yllán from CineNT wrote: "Tell Me About Yourself has in its favor that what it relates feels genuine, not forced, that it opens the debate to what society wants and what people want, that it shows that in the middle of the 21st century there are situations that do not change, that there are many others that have changed, that it tells a story with a surprising rhythm and that shows us what the new voices of national cinema can create." Etto Santana from MTY 360 wrote: "It is a fresh work, unpretentious, with good camera angles and sequences, copying a bit the musical scenes of Hollywood movies, as well as locations abroad most of the time, it is worth noting the soundtrack of the film."

=== Accolades ===
Year	Award	Category	Recipient	Result	Ref.
2023	Canacine Awards	Best Newcomer - Male	Germán Bracco	Won	
2023	Canacine Awards	Best Newcomer - Male	Martín Saracho	Nominated	
2023	Canacine Awards	Best Newcomer - Female	Isidora Vives	Nominated	
