= Sujo =

2024 Mexican film

- Theatrical release poster
- Directed by: Astrid Rondero; Fernanda Valadez
- Written by: Astrid Rondero; Fernanda Valadez
- Produced by: Astrid Rondero; Fernanda Valadez; Diana Arcega; Jewerl Keats Ross; Virginie Devesa; Jean-Baptiste Bailly-Maitre
- Cinematography: Ximena Amann
- Edited by: Astrid Rondero; Fernanda Valadez; Susan Korda
- Music by: Astrid Rondero
- Production company: Alpha Violet
- Distributed by: Damned Distribution (FR); The Forge (US); BEAM Films (UK)
- Release dates: January 19, 2024 (Sundance); August 21, 2024 (France); November 29, 2024 (United States); December 5, 2024 (Mexico)
- Running time: 126 minutes
- Countries: Mexico; United States; France
- Language: Spanish

Sujo is a 2024 coming-of-age crime drama film written and directed by Astrid Rondero and Fernanda Valadez, it stars Juan Jesús Varela.

The film had its world premiere at the World Cinema Dramatic Competition section of the 2024 Sundance Film Festival, where it won the Grand Jury Prize. It was selected as the Mexican entry for Best International Feature Film at the 97th Academy Awards, but was not nominated.

== Plot ==
Josué, a sicario for the cartel, is assassinated, leaving his 4-year-old son Sujo behind. Sujo's aunts, Nemesia and Rosalía, take him to be raised in a remote mountain shack. Sujo spends his childhood in isolation, with only his aunts and Rosalía's sons, Jai and Jeremy.

As the boys grow older, Sujo and his peers rebel and become involved with the drug violence around them. During a turf war, Jeremy is killed, and Sujo's aunt Nemesia sends him off to live in Mexico City.

== Release ==
The film debuted at the 2024 Sundance Film Festival on January 19, 2024. Its festival run also includes screenings at the 72nd San Sebastián International Film Festival ('Horizontes Latinos' strand) and the 2024 BFI London Film Festival.

Damned Distribution set an August 21, 2024 theatrical release date in France. The Forge acquired North-American distribution and set a November 29, 2024 theatrical release date in Canada and the United States. Beam Films acquired distribution films in the United Kingdom.

== Reception ==
On the review aggregator website Rotten Tomatoes, 97% of 29 critics' reviews are positive, with an average rating of 7.4/10. The website's consensus reads: "A consistently gripping coming-of-age story, Sujo reaffirms Astrid Rondero and Fernanda Valadez as two of the most exciting rising talents in Mexican cinema." Metacritic, which uses a weighted average, assigned the film a score of 80 out of 100, based on six critics, indicating "generally favorable" reviews. Reviewing for IndieWire, Carlos Aguilar graded the film an 'A', citing the film as "intricate in meaning and scope."

In September 2024, the Academia Mexicana de Artes y Ciencias Cinematográficas chose the film as Mexico's submission for the Goya Award for Best Ibero-American Film and for the Academy Award for Best International Film.

=== Awards and nominations ===
| Award | Ceremony date | Category | Recipient(s) | Result | Ref. |
|---|---|---|---|---|---|
| Sundance Film Festival | January 26, 2024 | World Cinema Grand Jury Prize: Dramatic | Sujo | Won | |
| San Sebastián International Film Festival | September 28, 2024 | Latin Horizons | Sujo | Nominated | |
| San Sebastián International Film Festival | September 28, 2024 | Spanish Cooperation Award | Sujo | Won | |
| Palm Springs International Film Festival | January 12, 2025 | Ibero-American Award | Sujo | Won | |

== See also ==
- List of Mexican films of 2024
- List of French films of 2024
- List of Mexican submissions for the Academy Award for Best International Feature Film
- List of submissions to the 97th Academy Awards for Best International Feature Film
