= Germán Bracco =

Mexican actor (born 1998)

- Born: 22 August 1998 (age 27); Mexico City, Mexico
- Occupation: Actor
- Years active: 2010–present

Germán Bracco (born 22 August 1998 in Mexico City, Mexico) is a Mexican television actor, and stage actor. Best known for his role Federico Becker in the Televisa's telenovela Caer en tentación (2017–2018), role for which he won the award for Best Young Lead Actor at the 36th TVyNovelas Awards. Although previously had a leading role in the series Yo soy yo (2016–2018), teen drama of the Mexican network Canal Once. Recently he has had important roles in series such as Mi marido tiene más familia (2018–2019), the second season of the Mexican family drama Mi marido tiene familia, and where he played the villain Guido Musi, and La usurpadora as Emilio Bernal, the son of the president of Mexico. On stage he has participated in La sociedad de los poetas muertos (2018–2019), Mexican adaptation of the film Dead Poets Society.

== Filmography ==
=== Film roles ===
Year	Title	Roles	Notes
2014	Perfect Obedience	Quicha	
2015	Los herederos	Chacho	
2015	El violín de Julián	Julián 18 years old	Short film
2022	Háblame de ti	Chava	Winner - Best Newcomer - Male at the Canacine Awards
2024	Technoboys	Jay	

=== Television roles ===
Year	Title	Roles	Notes
2010–2013	Cada quien su santo	Various roles	4 episodes
2013	Secretos de familia	Luis	
2014–2016	Lo que callamos las mujeres	Various roles	3 episodes
2015	El capitán Camacho	Camacho jr.	3 episodes
2016–2018	Yo soy yo	Francisco	Main role (seasons 1–2); 15 episodes
2016	Un día cualquiera	Arturo	Episode: "Bullying"
2017–2018	Caer en tentación	Federico Becker	Series regular; 98 episodes; Won—TVyNovelas Award for Best Young Lead Actor
2018–2019	Mi marido tiene familia	Guido Musi	Series regular; 70 episodes; Won—Tv Adicto Golden Award for Best Villain; Nominated—TVyNovelas Award for Best Antagonist Actor
2019	La usurpadora	Emilio Bernal	Series regular; 25 episodes
2020	Enemigo íntimo	Manuel Salas	Main cast (season 2)
2021	Buscando a Frida	Diego Carmona	Main cast

=== Stage roles ===
Year	Title	Roles	Notes
2018–2019	La sociedad de los poetas muertos	Knox Overstreet	
