= Alex Otaola =

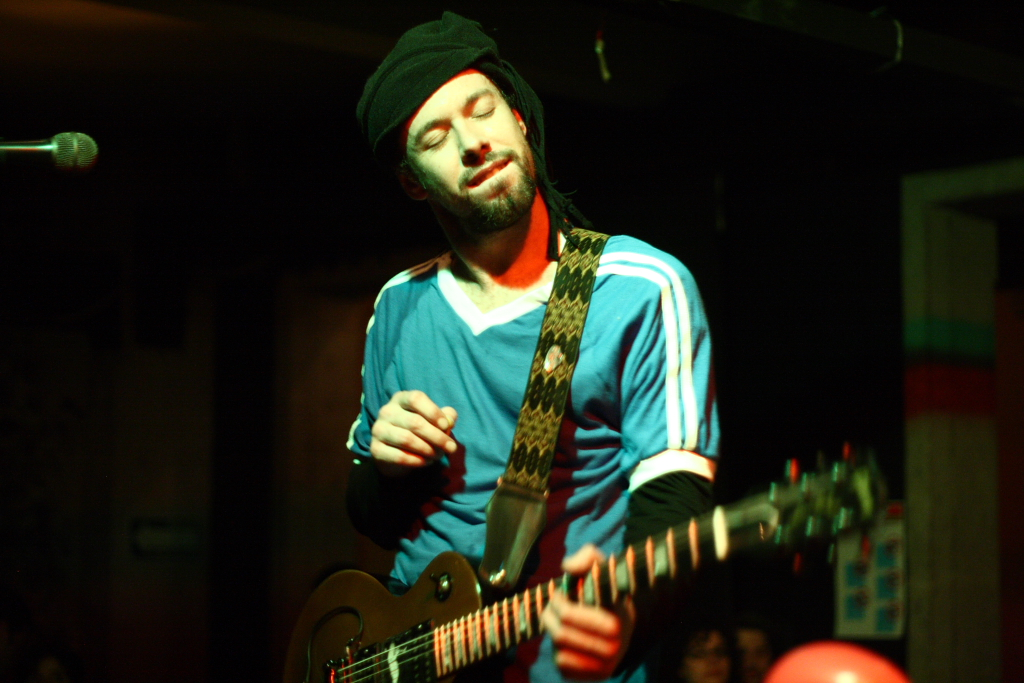

Background information
- Born: Alejandro Otaola
- Genres: Rock, Jazz rock, Pop rock
- Instruments: keyboards, guitars
- Years active: 1995-present
- Label: Intolerancia
- Website: alexotaola.com

Alex Otaola (Alejandro Otaola) is a rock and jazz rock musician from the Mexican capital, Mexico City. During his career he has been a member of numerous bands such as Santa Sabina, La Barranca San Pascualito Rey and Cuca. In 2007 he started a solo career.

== Santa Sabina ==
Otaola joined Santa Sabina as a replacement for their original guitarist Pablo Valero in 1995. During his time with the band he contributed to the following albums:

- Concierto Acustico
- Babel
- MTV Unplugged
- Mar Adentro En La Sangre
- Espiral
- En Vivo: XV Anniversario

== La Barranca ==
In 1999, while still working with Santa Sabina, Alex Otaola joined La Barranca. He became 2nd guitarist and keyboardist behind Jose Manuel Aguilera. When La Barranca was dissolved in 2006, Otaola had been involved in writing and performing for four albums:

- Rueda de Los Tiempos
- Denzura
- Cielo Protector
- El Fluir
- Yendo Al Cine Solo, a solo project by Jose Manuel Aguilera.

== Involvement in other projects ==
Over the years Alex Otaola has performed as a guest musician on a number of rock, jazz and pop projects such as:

- Petroleo
- Panteon Rococo
- Monocordio
- Regina Orozco
- El Haragan
- Jorge "Ziggy" Fratta
- Sr. Gonzalez
- Cecilia Toussaint
- LabA (Alonso Arreola)
- Forseps (José Fors)
- Klezmerson
- El Clan
- Yokozuna
- Los Dorados
- Zoe

== Solo career ==
In 2007, Alex Otaola released a solo project titled Fractales published by the Mexican independent label Intolerancia. The album combines improvised music on guitar and guitar synthesizer with fully composed instrumental songs, including contributions played by former band colleagues from Santa Sabina and La Barranca.
