= Alfonso Dosal =

Mexican actor (born 1985)

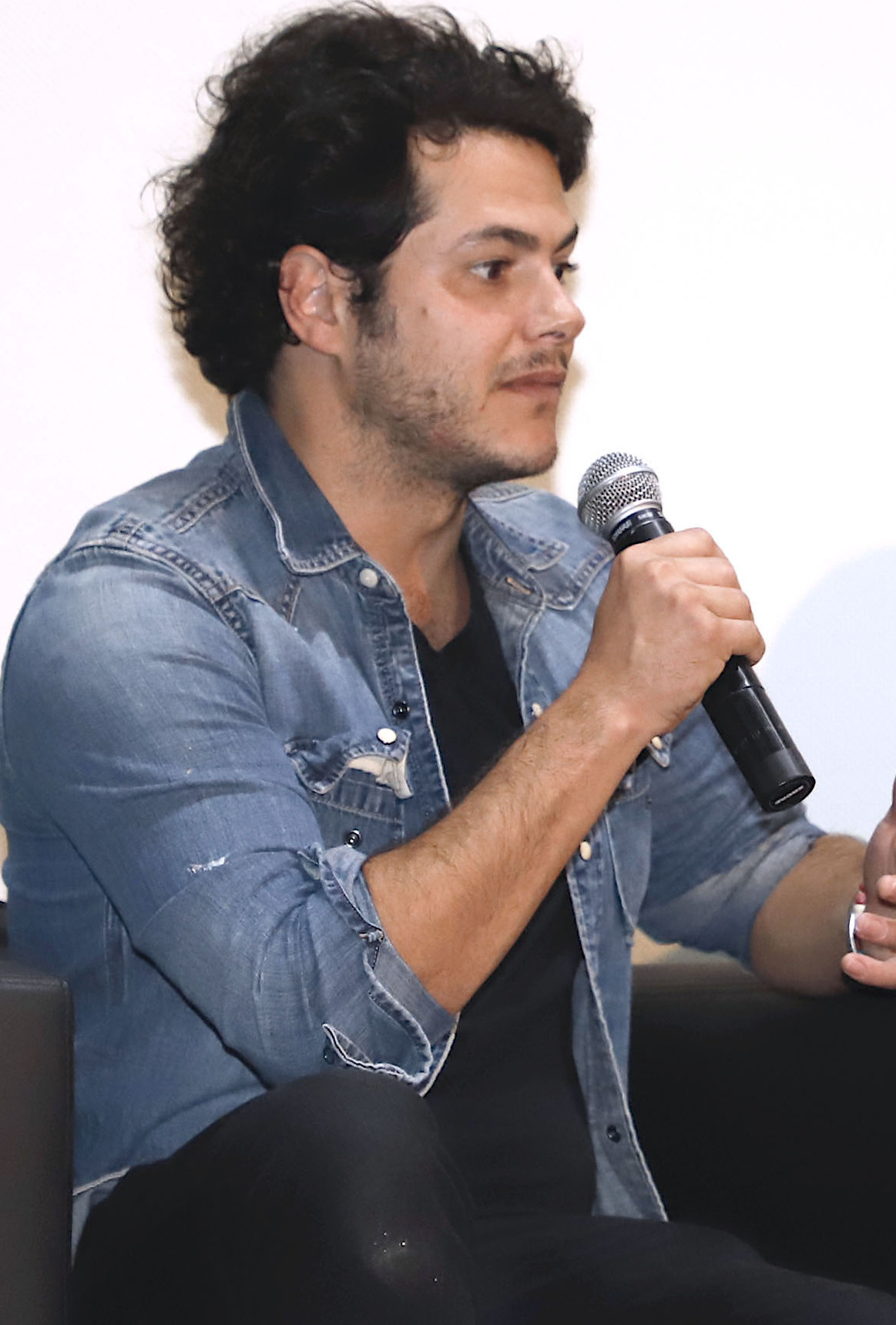
- Alfonso Dosal in a press conference in 2020
- Born: Manuel Alfonso Castro Dosal; March 13, 1985 (age 41); Mexico City, Mexico
- Occupation: Actor
- Years active: 2006–present
- Partner: Solana Azulay (2012-present)
- Children: 2

Manuel Alfonso Castro Dosal (born March 13, 1985), known professionally as Alfonso Dosal, is a Mexican actor.

== Early life and career ==
Dosal was born in Mexico City on March 13, 1985.

In his childhood he lived eight years in Querétaro and then returned to Mexico City. He studied acting at Casa Azul. Debuted in the telenovela Marina as young protagonist in 2006. After 4 years retiring in the telenovela Para Volver a Amar as young protagonist again and TVyNovelas Awards in 2011 awarded as Best Young Lead Actor of the Year.

In 2011 he played in theatrical performances El Knack, El viaje de Tina and Rojo. In 2012 played as special appearance in the teen telenovela Miss XV. In 2013 played in theatrical performance Agonía y Éxtasis de Steve Jobs. In 2014 played as special appearance again in the telenovela El color de la pasión.

== Personal life ==
Dosal has been in a relationship with Solana Azulay from 2012. They have two children. In December 2010, Dosal came out as bisexual.

== Filmography ==
=== Film ===
Year	Title	Role	Notes
2009	El cártel	Young Santos	Direct-to-DVD; prequel to novela
2010	La mina de oro	Muchacho	Short film
2010	180º	Juanjo	
2012	Amante de lo ajeno	Enano	
2013	Ladies Nice	Quique	
2013	De agua	Emmanuel	Short film
2013	The Last Call	Ángel	
2014	Elvira, te daría mi vida pero la estoy usando	Pepe	
2016	Helena	Iván	
2017	3 idiotas	Pancho	
2017	Hazlo como hombre	Santiago	
2021	Sin hijos	Fidel	
2022	Huesera: The Bone Woman	Raúl	
2023	Bad Actor	Daniel Zavala	

=== Television ===
Year	Title	Role	Notes
2006	Marina	Jesús "Chuy" Alarcón	Recurring role
2009	Ellas son, la alegría del hogar	Rodrigo	Recurring role
2010–2011	Para volver a amar	Sebastián Longoria Andrade	Co-lead role; 128 episodes
2012	Miss XV	Max	Recurring role
2014	El color de la pasión	Federico	Special guest; 4 episodes
2015–2016	A que no me dejas	Camilo	Co-lead role; 55 episodes
2018	Aquí en la Tierra	Carlos Calles	
2018-2021	Narcos: Mexico	Benjamín Arellano Félix	Main seasons 2–3, Recurring season 1
TBA	El Gato	Alejandro "Alex" Guerrero	Main role

== Awards and nominations ==
=== TVyNovelas Awards ===
Year	Category	Telenovela	Result
2011	Best Young Lead Actor	Para Volver a Amar	Won
2016	Best Young Lead Actor	A que no me dejas	Nominated

=== Premios People en Español ===
Year	Category	Telenovela	Result
2011	Revelation of the Year	Para Volver a Amar	Nominated

=== Premios Bravo ===
Year	Category	Telenovela/Theater	Result
2012	Male Revelation in Theater	Rojo	Won
2011	Best Actor Revelation	Para Volver a Amar	Won
