= Alonso Ruizpalacios =

Mexican film director

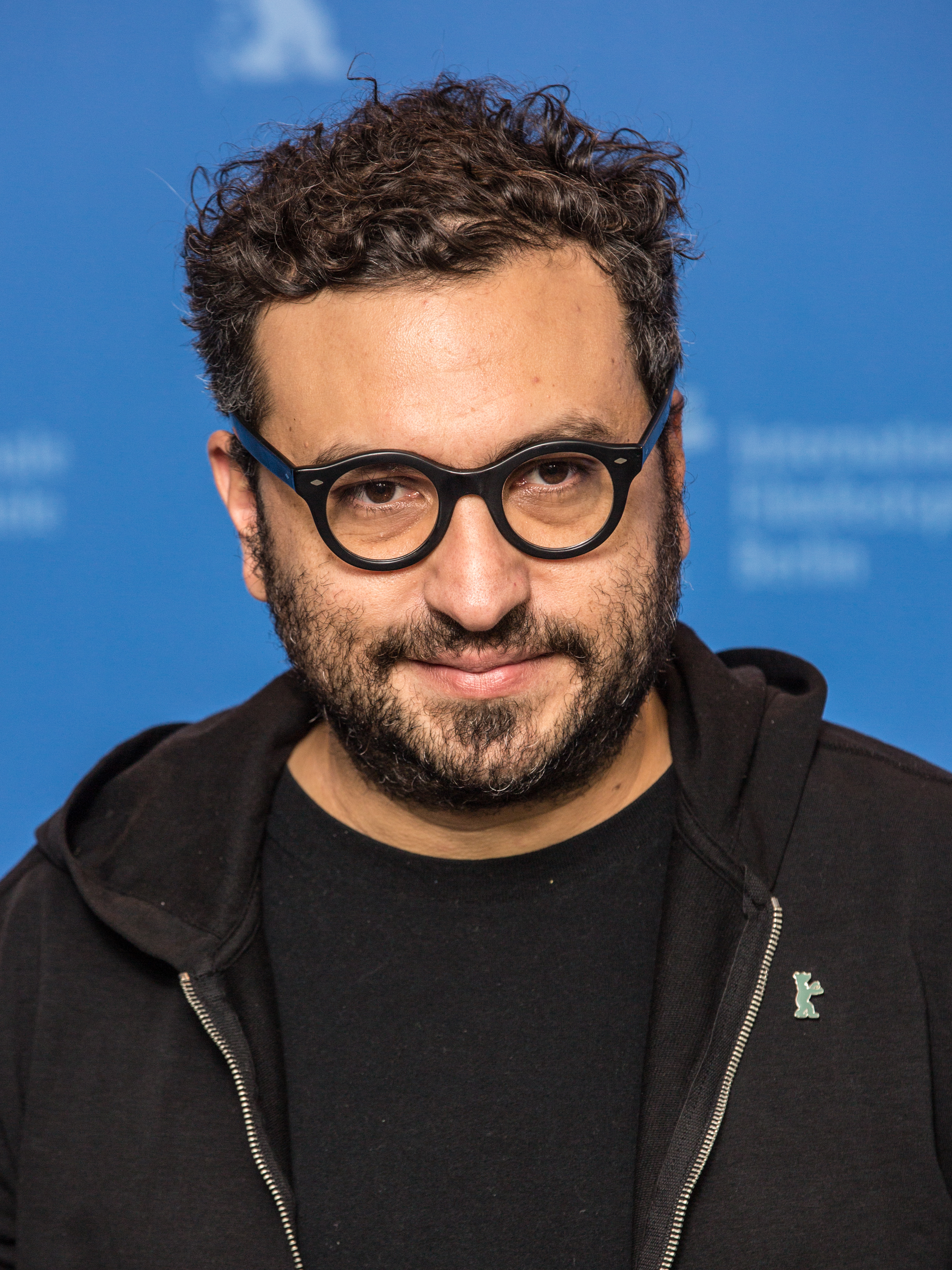
Alonso Ruizpalacios at 68th Berlin International Film Festival

Alonso Ruizpalacios (Latin American Spanish: [aˈlonso rwispaˈlasjos]; born 1978) is a Mexican film director. He is best known for directing the feature films Güeros (2014), Museum (2018), A Cop Movie (2021) and La cocina (2024).

== Biography ==
Ruizpalacios was born and raised in Mexico City. He studied stage directing in Mexico City, before moving to London where he trained as an actor at RADA. Ruizpalacios writes and directs for both stage and screen. His short film Café Paraíso won multiple awards on the film festival circuit. His debut feature Güeros, shot in black and white, was lauded by critics and won five Ariel Awards in 2015, including Best Picture, Best First Film and Best Director. Ruizpalacios also directed the music video for "Hasta la Raíz" by Mexican singer-songwriter Natalia Lafourcade.

He recently directed the movie Museo, starring Gael García Bernal. The film won the best script award at the Berlin International Film Festival. Museum has also been present in other international festivals. The film tells the story of the famous robbery to the National Museo of Anthropology on December 25, 1985, in Mexico City.

He has also contributed towards TV series: directing two episodes for Narcos: Mexico and two episodes for the Mexican TV show Aquí en la tierra; besides being the showrunner of the XY TV show for the Mexican television network Once TV. Ruizpalacios also directed season 2 episodes 10 to 12 of the Star Wars show Andor.

Ruizpalacios has named Nuri Bilge Ceylan as his favourite living director.

== Selected filmography ==
- Güeros (2014)
- Museum (2018)
- A Cop Movie (2021)
- La Cocina (2024)
- Andor (2025, TV series, 3 episodes)
