= Mayra Batalla =

Mexican actress

- Mayra Batalla at the 2024 Toronto International Film Festival
- Born: 25 October 1990 (age 35); Álamo, Veracruz, Mexico

Mayra Batalla Pavón (born 25 October 1990) is a Mexican actress, known for her role in the award-winning 2021 film Prayers for the Stolen, which earned her an Ariel Award for Best Supporting Actress in October 2022.

== Biography ==
Batalla was born on October 25, 1990, in Álamo, Veracruz. She began her career as an actress at a young age, enrolling in theater courses as early as middle school. When she turned 18, she moved to Mexico City to study acting at La Casa del Teatro. After that, she moved to Paris, France, where she specialized in vocal performance and theater choreography at Panthéâtre.

== Career ==
Batalla has acted in many plays, such as Bárbara Gandiaga, Las cosas simples, Ángeles en América, Si una noche o algo así, La viuda astuta, and En la mira.

In addition to her work on stage, Batalla has starred in both short and feature-length films. She recently starred in Huesera: The Bone Woman (2022) and has a minor role in The Muleteer (2024).
