= Guanajuato International Film Festival =

Annual international film festival

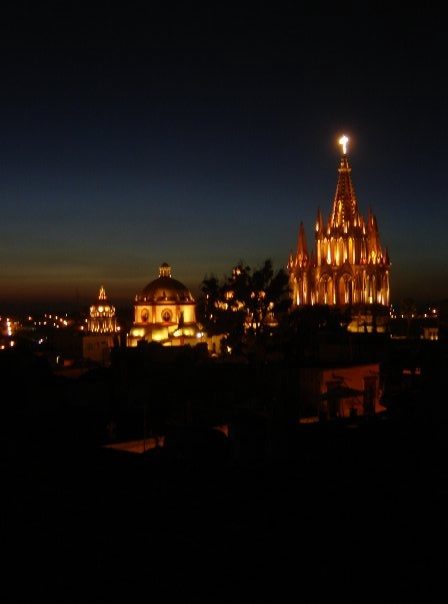
San Miguel de Allende at night

The Guanajuato International Film Festival or GIFF is an annual international film festival, held since 1998. It is held during the final week of July in San Miguel de Allende and Guanajuato City, Mexico. GIFF was formerly known as Expresión en Corto International Film Festival.

As a non-profit organization that is a state-sponsored, and as a cultural event that does not charge admission to its viewing audience, GIFF estimates an attendance of more than 90,000 total audience members and generally receives more than 3,000 submissions from 109 participating countries in its international competition. It presents a variety of films, conferences, workshops, tributes and activities at no cost to the visiting public.

== Venues ==
More than 400 films are screened from 10am until 4am each day in 20 venues, which include such unusual locations as: the Jardín Principal (main square) of San Miguel de Allende; the classical open-air staircase of the University of Guanajuato; the subterranean streets and tunnels beneath the city of Guanajuato where underground films are screened; as well as horror films in the infamous Museum of the Mummies of Guanajuato and both municipal graveyards (panteónes). There are also screenings in more conventional spaces such as Teatro Ángela Peralta (SMA), Centro Cultural Ignacio Ramirez - El Nigromante (SMA), Teatro Santa Ana (SMA), Galería Kunsthaus Santa Fe (SMA), the Auditorio del Estado de Guanajuato and the Teatro Principal.

== Categories in competition and prizes ==
The international competition is the largest in Mexico, with films competing in a variety of categories that include: Short Fiction, Short Animation, Short Experimental, Short Documentary, Feature Documentary and both Mexican and International Feature Length Opera Prima (or debut features by first-time directors). GIFF awards winners with 35mm and 16mm film stock, developing services, video-to-film transfers, production equipment packages and post-production services as well as scholarships for undergraduate and graduate film study.

Recipients of the festival's prizes in the categories of Short Fiction and Short Animation will qualify for consideration in the Short Films category of the Annual Academy Awards provided the film complies with the Academy rules which can be found on: www.oscars.org

As a BAFTA recognized film festival, all films accepted and screened at the Guanajuato International Film Festival qualify to be considered for the Orange British Academy Short Film Awards.

== Special screenings ==
Movies with Mummy

From the stroke of midnight onward, both San Miguel de Allende and Guanajuato Capital open their graveyards for the festival's "Cine entre muertos", which screens horror films among the tombstones, the mausoleums and the dead. The appropriately dubbed "Movies with Mummy", screens horror films in Guanajuato's infamous Museum of the Mummies of Guanajuato.

Midnight Madness

The contemporary art gallery Kunsthaus Santa Fe in San Miguel de Allende, and the tunnels beneath Guanajuato Capital, are converted into makeshift theaters for a celebration of sexual diversity called "Midnight Madness", which includes gay, lesbian, erotic, experimental and underground films.

Oscar's Night

Academy Award winners and nominated short films and documentaries are presented by their directors, who share their experiences with the festival audience.

== National tributes ==
Each year, GIFF pays homage to the men and women that have given their lives to film, a tribute which demonstrates Mexico's immense respect, admiration and gratitude for their work. The festival has bestowed this recognition upon both national and international filmmakers, including:

Tim Burton, Oliver Stone, Peter Greenaway, Spike Lee, Kenneth Anger, Deepa Mehta, Shyam Benegal, Alejandro González Iñárritu, Eliseo Subiela, Bong Joon-ho, Park Chan-wook, Tongolele, Joaquín Cordero, Irvin Kershner, Gaspar Noé, Felipe Cazals, Josefina Echánove, Patricia Reyes Spíndola, Diana Bracho, María Rojo, Miguel Zacarías, Rafael Inclán, Julio Alemán, Don Manuel Esperón, and Marga López, to name a few.

== Women in Film and Television International ==
GIFF, in association with Women In Film and Television International, celebrates cinema's most accomplished women who have invigorated life into the medium and have exported the Mexican feminine image beyond Mexico's borders. This yearly reunion salutes the individuals whose invaluable work supports the dignity of women worldwide and their contribution to cinematography.

Past honorees have included: Bertha Navarro, Lucrecia Martel, Graciela Borges, Brigitte Broch, Katy Jurado, Angélica Aragón, Gloria Schoemann, Carmen Montejo, Silvia Pinal, Ana Ofelia Murguía, Ofelia Medina, Carla Estrada y María Elena Velasco, Adriana Barraza and Marcela Fernández Violente, to name a few.

== Spotlight countries ==
Yearly, GIFF contends with the participation of a guest country of honor, which presents the best of that country's film, music and culture. By way of special delegates who offer conferences, workshops, retrospectives, as well as present their country's industry; this cultural exchange reinforces the relationships between the creators of both nations while promoting artistic co-production. In previous years Canada, Spain, Germany, Brazil, France, the US, India, the U.K., Argentina and South Korea have all been Spotlight Countries. For the fifteenth edition of the festival ( 2012) the Netherlands was their most honored guests.

World-recognized film institutions that have participated in the past include: Cannes Film Festival, Festival du Court-Métrage de Clermont-Ferrand, Interfilm Berlin, International Short Film Festival Oberhausen, Huesca International Film Festival, Annecy International Animated Film Festival, Canal+, Academy of Motion Picture Arts and Sciences, American Film Institute, Museum of Modern Art, Berkeley Art Museum and Pacific Film Archive, Frameline, Outfest, MIX NYC, South by Southwest, Palm Springs International Film Festival, Chicago International Film Festival, Tribeca Film Festival, Sundance Institute, the Vancouver Film School, and the University of Southern California and the University of Texas at Austin film departments.

== International Pitching Market ==
Each year, the festival hosts an annual International Pitching Market, which summons international producers, directors, distributors, production services providers, theater owners, and diverse film financing institutions from around the world who are interested in participating in co-productions with the top Mexican feature film projects currently in development. The Pitching Market includes panels pertinent to obtaining current sources of financing for films, focusing on the current and future possibilities of international co-productions, with particular emphasis on the Mexican and Spotlight Country's film industries.

== MexiCannes Summer Residence Program ==
In May 2008 GIFF announced a partnership with the Cinéfondation which was created by the Cannes Film Festival, to launch a program called the MexiCannes Summer Residence Program. This program serves as an extension to the Cinéfondation La Residence, which yearly selects a dozen of the very best young filmmakers in the world and offers them a platform designed to propel their careers. GIFF additionally nominates 2 of the top Mexican filmmakers to MexiCannes, which includes private master's classes, workshops and meetings with producers, distributors and film financiers during the International Pitching Market, helping them secure financing for their film projects. Since the second session of The Résidence runs until mid-July, just before GIFF begins, it is the first opportunity for many producers to learn about these projects and meet the filmmakers themselves.

== Incubator ==
INCUBATOR is a project focused on nurturing and developing the next generation of Mexican producers and international filmmakers. Incubator extends an invitation to all Mexican and international filmmakers selected for competition, as well as the Cinéfondation Residence Laureates, to participate in conferences and receive one-on-one advice from industry professionals on the subjects of the development and appraisal of scripts, financing, pitching, packaging and promoting their projects at film festivals, markets and professional business meetings. These instructive conferences are organized to illustrate the process by which a project in need of financing is prepared and brought to a financier or co-producer.

Participants will take part in one-on-one advising sessions, during which they meet personally with industry delegates and receive advice on their own specific projects. In these conferences and advising sessions, experts from the industry give the novice producers tools on how to develop and present their projects professionally.

Participants in INCUBATOR will be chosen based upon their professional career thus far (short film, feature film, television drama, video clip or commercial) and the theme, synopsis, script or material in development they have prepared for their next feature film or project.

== 48-Hour Collegiate Production Rally ==
Each year GIFF invites eight film schools and universities from across Mexico to participate in the 48-Hour Collegiate Production Rally. Universities are invited to submit 3–5-minute short fiction scripts, with open theme and subject matter, written by currently enrolled university students. The eight selected universities will be invited to compete against each other in Guanajuato Capital during the festival, as they attempt to shoot a film in high-definition video, edit and present their short within 48 hours.

Each selected university will assemble a 10-person production team, consisting of a producer, director, cinematographer, sound technician, lighting technician, editor(s), set designer, wardrobe, make-up, production assistants, etc., and will be assigned two professional actors. All locations, sets, props and wardrobe must be sourced within Guanajuato, meaning the eight teams will have to literally knock on the doors of the Guanajuato community and ask for these items to be lent for the production. Each script must contain at least two main characters/actors, four separate shooting locations, including two daytime scenes and two nighttime scenes, and both indoor and outdoor scenes.

The eight films will be presented during the Festival, and the best films will be awarded prizes on the night of the closing ceremonies.

== Themes ==
Each edition of GIFF explores a chosen theme through its special programs, installations and guest speakers. Previous themes have included: "In the Land of the Blind", "Seven Virtues and Seven Sins", "Censorship, Self-Censorship and Provocation", "Breakout Filmmaking", "Identity" and "Liberty". In 2011 the festival's central theme will be "Tolerance".

== See also ==
- Film festivals in North and Central America
