= José María Martínez =

José María Martínez may refer to:

- José María Martinez Salinas (1780-unknown), Honduran Head of State
- José María Martínez de las Rivas (1848-1913), Spanish businessman and industrialist
- José María Martínez Sánchez-Arjona (1905-1977), Spanish politician
- José María Martínez (footballer, born 1947), Argentine football midfielder
- José María Martínez (footballer, born 1967), Argentine football manager and former midfielder
- José María Martínez (canoeist) (born 1968), Spanish slalom canoer
- Jose María Martínez Martínez (born 1972), Mexican politician

== See also ==
- Jose Martinez (disambiguation)
- José Mari Martínez (disambiguation)
