= José Luis Martínez =

José Luis Martínez may refer to:

== Politics ==
- José Luis Olivas Martinez (born 1952), Spanish politician
- José Luis Márquez Martínez (born 1966), Mexican politician
- José Luis Álvarez Martínez (born 1968), Mexican politician
- José Luis Martínez Guijarro (born 1968), Spanish politician

== Sports ==
- José Luis Martínez (basketball) for Real Madrid Baloncesto
- José Luis Martínez (hammer thrower) (1943–2004), Spanish hammer thrower
- José Luis Martínez (footballer) (born 1971), in 1991 FIFA World Youth Championship squads
- Jose Luis Martinez (motocross racer), in 2008 FIM Motocross World Championship
- José Luis Martínez (Paralympian shooter), in Shooting at the 2008 Summer Paralympics – Mixed 50 metre pistol SH1
- José Luis Martínez (runner), Spanish runner in 1962 Ibero-American Games
- José Luis Martínez (shot putter), Spanish shot putter in 1998 Ibero-American Championships in Athletics
- José Luis Martínez (sport shooter) (1926–2014), Spanish sport shooter who competed at the 1968 Summer Olympics
- José Luis Martínez (weightlifter) (born 1968), Spanish Olympic weightlifter
- José Luis Martínez Bazán (1942–2015), Uruguayan referee
- José Luis Martínez Gullotta (born 1984), Argentine football goalkeeper
- José Luis Dámaso Martinez (born 1974), Spanish international professional basketball coach
- José Luís Grant Martínez (born 1983), Honduran footballer
- José Luis Hernández Martínez (born 1994), Mexican footballer
- José Luis Laguía Martínez (born 1959), Spanish cyclist

== Other ==
- José Luis Martínez Rodríguez (1918–2007), Mexican writer, diplomat, and academic
- José Luis Cuerda Martínez (1947–2020), Spanish filmmaker
- José Luis Dibildox Martínez (1943–2018), Mexican Roman Catholic bishop
- José Luis Gómez Martínez (born 1943), Spanish professor
- Jose Luis Martinez (actor), in Malaventura, a 2011 Mexican film
- José Luís Restán Martínez (born 1958), Spanish journalist and radio broadcaster

== See also ==
- José Martínez (disambiguation)
- Luis Martínez (disambiguation)
