= Alazraki =

Alazraki is a surname of Arabic origin, notably borne by the Alazraki family of Mexico. Members of the family include:

- Benito Alazraki (1921–2007), Mexican film director and screenwriter
- Carlos Alazraki (born 1947), Mexican advertising executive, son of Benito
- Gary Alazraki (born 1983), Mexican film director, son of Carlos
- Valentina Alazraki (born 1955), Mexican journalist and writer

== See also ==
- Alazraqui, a Spanish surname
- Azraqi, an 11th-century Persian poet
- Al-Azraqi, a 9th-century Islamic commentator and historian
