= The Ballad of Hugo Sánchez =

Mexican comedy-drama web television series

- Also known as: La balada de Hugo Sánchez
- Genre: Comedy drama
- Created by: Mark Alazraki; Moisés Chiver; Gaz Alazraki
- Screenplay by: Mehar Sethi; Mark Alazraki; Conor Galvin; Dave Newberg; L.E. Correia; Jaclyn Moore
- Directed by: Álvaro Curiel; Mark Alazraki
- Starring: Jesús Zavala; Pedro Miguel Arce; Marcela Mar; Luis Gerardo Méndez; Mariana Treviño; Gianina Arana
- Country of origin: Mexico
- Original language: Spanish
- No. of seasons: 1
- No. of episodes: 6

Production
- Executive producers: Mark Alazraki; Moisés Chiver; Gaz Alazraki; Mehar Sethi
- Production company: Alazraki Entertainment

Original release
- Network: Netflix
- Release: 17 June 2018

Related
- Club de Cuervos

The Ballad of Hugo Sánchez (or Club de Cuervos Presents: The Ballad of Hugo Sánchez; Spanish: La balada de Hugo Sánchez) is a Mexican comedy-drama television series that premiered on 17 June 2018 on Netflix. It is a spin-off based on Hugo Sánchez character from the Mexican series Club de Cuervos. The entire miniseries takes place within the first episode of season four of Club de Cuervos, which reuses several scenes from the miniseries.

== Plot ==
Hugo Sánchez (Jesús Zavala), who now, after being named Chava's personal assistant, will be in charge of taking the Cuervos to a tournament in Nicaragua called "Duelo de las Aves". For the first time, Hugo leaves his comfort zone to take charge of a team and his own life.

== Cast ==
- Jesús Zavala as Hugo Sánchez
- Pedro Miguel Arce as Panda
- Marcela Mar as Abril
- Luis Gerardo Méndez as Salvador "Chava" Iglesias
- Mariana Treviño as Isabel Iglesias
- Gianina Arana as Dalia

== Episodes ==
=== Season 1 (2018) ===
No.	Title	Directed by	Written by	Original release date
1	"Wear Sunscreen" "Ponte bloqueador"	Mark Alazraki	Conor Galvin & Mark Alazraki	June 17, 2018
2	"Father of the Jungle" "Padre de la selva"	Álavaro Curiel	Mehar Sethi	June 17, 2018
3	"Mexican Pride" "Orgullo mexicano"	Álavaro Curiel	Dave Newberg	June 17, 2018
4	"Sánchez Caskets" "Ataúdes Sánchez"	Álavaro Curiel	L.E. Correia	June 17, 2018
5	"Celebrity Guest" "Finas visitas"	Mark Alazraki	Conor Galvin	June 17, 2018
6	"Scumbags" "Los despreciables"	Mark Alazraki	Mehar Sethi & Bennett Walsh	June 17, 2018
