= José Martínez =

José Martínez may refer to:

== Religion ==
- José Antonio Martínez de Aldunate (1731–1811), Chilean bishop and government member
- Antonio José Martínez (1793–1867), New Mexico Catholic priest
- José O'Callaghan Martínez (1922–2001), Spanish Jesuit Catholic priest, papyrologist, and biblical scholar

== Sports ==
=== Baseball ===
- José Martínez (infielder/coach) (1942–2014), Cuban infielder, coach, and executive in Major League Baseball
- José Martínez (pitcher) (born 1971), Dominican pitcher in Major League Baseball
- José Martínez (outfielder/first baseman) (born 1988), Venezuelan infielder/outfielder in Major League baseball

=== Football ===
- José Martínez Sánchez (born 1941), better known as Pirri, Spanish football player
- José María Martínez (footballer) (1947–2012), Argentine footballer
- Chepe Martínez (born 1979), Salvadoran footballer who plays for Chalatenango
- José Guadalupe Martínez (born 1983), Mexican goalkeeper for Puebla F.C.
- José Martínez (footballer, born 1983), Spanish football player
- José Joaquín Martínez (born 1987), soccer player that plays for Club América
- José Martínez (footballer, born 1991), Chilean footballer who plays for Universidad Católica
- José Martínez (footballer, born 1993), Spanish footballer who plays for Yunnan Yukun
- José Hernández (footballer, born 1994), Mexican footballer
- José Andrés Martínez (born 1994) Venezuelan, currently with Philadelphia Union
- José Martínez Marsà (born 2002), Spanish football defender
- José Martínez (footballer, born 2002), Bolivian footballer
- José Carlos Martínez (footballer) (born 1997), Guatemalan footballer

=== Track and field ===
- José Martínez (sprinter) (1901–?), Mexican Olympic sprinter
- Maria José Martínez-Patiño (born 1961), Spanish hurdler, competed as woman but was declared a man
- José Manuel Martínez (athlete) (born 1971), Spanish long-distance runner
- José Martínez Morote (born 1984), Spanish athlete

=== Water sports ===
- José Martínez (rowing) (1895–1971), Spanish coxswain
- José Martínez (Cuban swimmer) (born 1952), Cuban swimmer
- José María Martínez (canoeist) (born 1968), Spanish slalom canoer
- José Martínez (canoeist) (born 1973), Mexican sprint canoer
- José Ángel Martínez (born 1997), Mexican swimmer

=== Other sports ===
- José Martínez Ahumada (José Martínez "Limeño"; 1936–2015), Spanish bullfighter
- Jose Martinez (boxer) (born 1951), Canadian Olympic boxer
- José Martínez Valero (1911–1963), Spanish boxer
- Jose Martinez-Zorilla (1912–1989), Mexican Olympic fencer
- José Martínez (volleyball) (born 1993), Mexican international volleyball player
- José Martínez (weightlifter) (born 1950), Colombian Olympic weightlifter
- José Alberto Martínez (born 1975), Spanish professional road bicycle racer
- Jose Eduardo Martinez Alcantara (born 1999), Peruvian chess player

== Other ==
- Esteban José Martínez Fernández y Martínez de la Sierra (1742–1798), Spanish explorer of the Pacific Northwest
- José Longinos Martínez (fl. 1792), Spanish naturalist
- José Martínez Ruiz (1873–1967), Spanish poet and writer
- Jose E. Martinez (born 1941), American lawyer and judge
- José Carlos Martínez (politician) (1962–2011), Argentine politician
- José Carlos Martínez (dancer) (born 1969), Spanish dancer
- José Martínez (singer) (active since 1997), singer in C-Note
- José Manuel Martínez (serial killer) (born 1962), former self-described Mexican drug cartel hitman
- José Martínez de Roda, 1st Marquis of Vistabella (1855–1899), Spanish aristocrat and politician

== See also ==
- José Antonio Martínez (disambiguation)
- José Luis Martínez (disambiguation)
- José Mari Martínez (disambiguation)
- José María Martínez (disambiguation)
- Pepe Martínez (disambiguation)
