= Joaquín Ferreira =

Mexican actor

- Born: April 28, 1986 (age 40); Buenos Aires, Argentina
- Occupation: Actor
- Years active: 2015–present

Joaquín Ferreira (born April 28, 1986) is an Argentine actor, model and former pornographic actor, best known for his role as Potro Romani in the Netflix comedy-drama series, Club de Cuervos.

== Life and career ==
Ferreira was born and raised in Buenos Aires, Argentina. He attended University of Buenos Aires and University of Palermo where he finished his career in graphic design. In Argentina, Ferreira performed in porn under name David Dynamo. He later moved to Mexico and in 2015 landed a role on Netflix's first Spanish-language original series Club de Cuervos. In 2016, he made his theater debut in comedy 23 centimetros, appearing on stage fully naked with erected penis. In 2018, he starred in the Club de Cuervos spinoff, Yo, Potro.

Ferreira starred in Mexican telenovelas Paquita la del Barrio (2017), Tres Milagros (2018) and Doña Flor y sus dos maridos (2019).

== Filmography ==
Year	Title	Role	Notes
2015-2019	Club de Cuervos	Potro Romani	Series regular, 34 episodes
2017	Melocotones	Sandro	
2017	Paquita la del Barrio	Alfonso	35 episodes
2018	Tres Milagros	Fernando Rendón	55 episodes
2018	40 y 20	Cantante	Episode: "Las groupies"
2018	Yo, Potro	Potro Romani	
2019	Doña Flor y sus dos maridos	Valentín Hernández	65 episodes
2021	Bankrolled	Bobby	
2021	La suerte de Loli	Octavio	Main role
2022	Franklin, historia de un billete	Yelmo	
2023	Buenos chicos	Abel Guzmán	20 episodes
2024	Coppola, el representante	Leopoldo Armentano	2 episodes
2024	Technoboys	Leo	
