= Club de Cuervos =

Mexican TV series

- Also known as: Club of Crows
- Genre: Comedy drama
- Created by: Gaz Alazraki; Michael Lam
- Written by: Alessia Costantini; Jay Dyer; Michael Lam; Russell Eida; Gaz Alazraki; Michael Svoboda
- Directed by: Gaz Alazraki
- Starring: Luis Gerardo Méndez; Mariana Treviño; Stephanie Cayo
- Country of origin: Mexico
- Original language: Spanish
- No. of seasons: 4
- No. of episodes: 45

Production
- Producers: Gaz Alazraki; Michael Lam; Leonardo Zimbron
- Production locations: Pachuca, Hidalgo, Mexico

Original release
- Network: Netflix
- Release: August 7, 2015 – January 25, 2019

Related
- The Ballad of Hugo Sánchez; Yo, Potro

Club de Cuervos, also known as Club of Crows, is a Mexican comedy-drama television series created by Gary "Gaz" Alazraki and Michael Lam. Premiering with its full first season on August 7, 2015, it is the first Spanish-language Netflix original series. The story centers on the football club Cuervos FC, based in the fictional city of Nuevo Toledo, Mexico, and the power struggle that follows the death of its long-time owner and patriarch. Club de Cuervos stars Luis Gerardo Méndez and Mariana Treviño as two siblings who fight over ownership and direction of the team.

Scripted by both Mexican and American writers, the first season of Club de Cuervos was shot in Pachuca, Hidalgo. The series has received mostly positive reviews from critics, who praised the show's pacing and originality. It was renewed for a second season on October 28, 2015. The second season premiered on December 10, 2016. Season three premiered on September 29, 2017. All episodes of the 4th and final season premiered on January 25, 2019

== Premise ==
Set in the fictional city of Nuevo Toledo, Mexico, the series focuses on the Cuervos F.C., a football team that faces an identity crisis after the death of its owner, Salvador Iglesias Sr. Due to male-dominant cultural attitudes, his son, Chava, is quickly chosen to take on the role of new president, despite the fact that his sister, Isabel, is considered to be better suited to run the team. Isabel is resentful of Chava and his position as leader, and vows to do whatever possible to take his place as president. Chava, whose vision is to transform the team into the "Real Madrid of Latin America", soon proves to be a poor decision-maker and often angers his subordinates, especially Vice President Felix Domingo and Coach Goyo. The first season also explores the relationships between the players on the team, and how they are impacted by Chava's decisions.

== Cast and characters ==
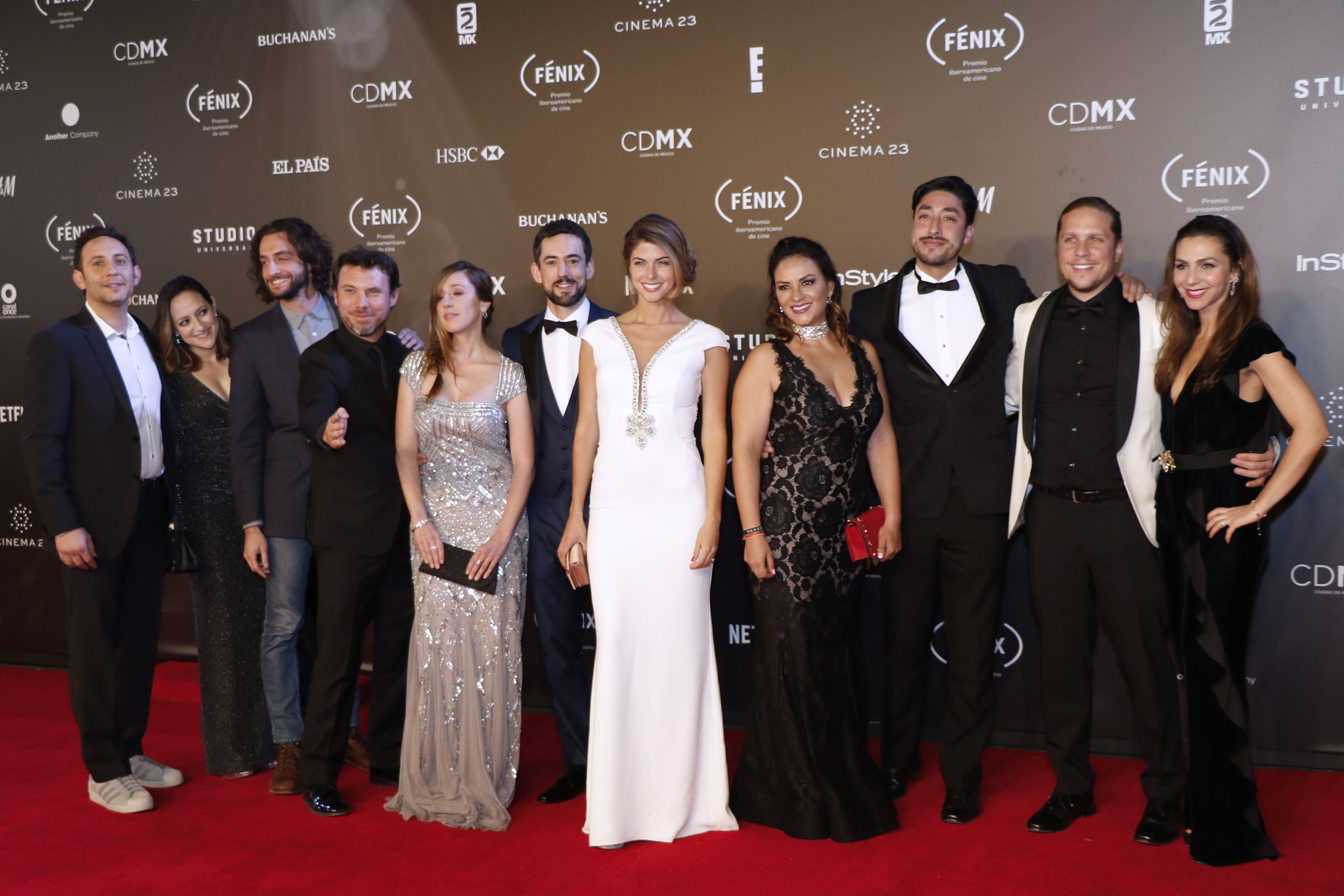
Club de Cuervos cast at the 2017 Premios Fénix

=== Main cast ===
- Luis Gerardo Méndez as Salvador "Chava" Iglesias Jr. – After his father's death, Chava is elected to the role of president of the Cuervos football club, much to the consternation of his older half-sister Isabel. Chava's limited knowledge of sports management and short-sighted vision puts the historic team's standing at risk.
- Mariana Treviño as Isabel Iglesias-Reina – Chava's half-sister and the oldest child of Salvador Iglesias Sr. While Isabel is clearly more experienced and well-equipped to run Cuervos FC after her father's death, she is passed over for the presidency because she is a woman. In spite of her intelligence and work ethic, she is not a natural politician and has a tendency to make mistakes due to her lack of patience and volatile temper.
- Stephanie Cayo as Mary Luz Solari – The former girlfriend of Salvador Iglesias Sr., Mary Luz claims to be pregnant with Salvador's unborn child. This claim has enormous implications for both Chava and Isabel, as it would entitle Mary Luz to one third of the team and family fortune. Though Mary Luz acts naive, she is often surprisingly savvy and convinces the family's lawyer to allow her to stay in Salvador's residence until a DNA test can be performed. While Isabel immediately rejects the idea that she might have another brother or sister, Chava is more receptive to the idea. (seasons 1-2, 4)
- Daniel Giménez Cacho as Felix Domingo – Vice President and Technical Director of the Cuervos de Nuevo Toledo. A veteran of football, who has devoted 30 years to growing the team. After the death of Salvador Iglesias, Chava decides to help to continue the Plan of 8 Years formulated by his father. However, Chava's ego prevents Felix from steering the team in the right direction. Felix is strongly affected by the constant fights and conflicts of the Iglesias siblings, looking for any means to keep control of the team and prevent Chava and Isabel sabotaging each other. (season 1-2)
- Antonio de la Vega as Rafael Reina – Spouse of Isabel Iglesias and Goalkeeper of the Cuervos. About to retire, Rafael serves as Isabel's main source of moral support.
- Jesús Zavala as Hugo Sánchez — Known as the 'other' Hugo Sánchez, he is Chava's personal assistant. His name is a joke based on the real Hugo Sánchez, a retired Mexican football player. He is the only character throughout the series that is always referred to by his full name. (special performances in season 1)
- Ianis Guerrero as Moisés "El Hierro" Suárez – Forward of the Cuervos. Moses is an excellent player and is the team captain. He has a close relationship with Chava and seeks to make every effort to lead the team responsibly, despite the consequences in his personal life. (season 1, recurring seasons 2-4)
- Melissa Barrera as Isabel Cantú – A socialite who resides in Puebla. She met Chava at the nightclub and ended up having a relationship with him. Their relationship led to the alignment of Cuervos FC with Cantú family and Cantumex, funding Cuervos' stadium in Puebla and aligning their partnerships with ESTV, Maxivision and Televisol's rival (season 3)

=== Secondary characters ===
- Arap Bethke as Juan Pablo "JP" Iglesias: Cousin of Chava and Isabel, Juan Pablo is a well-known humanitarian and altruist, who is seeking support from the Cuervos to publicize their campaign donations. (Recurring seasons 2 and 4, Special performances in Seasons 1 and 3)
- Aldo Escalante as Carmelo: Isabel's personal assistant. He often shows concern for his boss.
- Joaquín Ferreira as Diego "Potro" Romani: Forward of the Cuervos. A party animal from Argentina, who struggles financially due to negligent spending of his salary on luxuries and drugs.
- Said Sandoval as Cuauhtémoc "Cuau" Cruz: Defender of the Cuervos. An arrogant footballer who is proficient in accounting.
- Alosian Vivancos as Aitor Cardoné: A famous Spanish soccer player, whom Chava meets at a nightclub in Miami. After being previously on FC Barcelona, he begins to play for the Cuervos at the insistence of Chava for a large sum of money. However, he is quite moody, stubborn, and eccentric, which irritates the other players and creates significant internal conflict for the team. He is pansexual, much to Chava's chagrin after Aitor makes sexual advances at him. (special performances in season 2, recurring seasons 1 and 4)
- Andrés Pardave as Gómez Prieto: The corrupt governor of Nuevo Toledo who aids Chava in an attempt to recover his public image. (season 1-3)
- Sofía Sisniega as Patricia "Paty" Villa: An aspiring reporter who hooked up with Chava.
- Josee Rodriquez as Josie
- Andrés Montiel as Víctor Valdés
- Victor Duroc as Sammy "Ostíon" Rodriguez: A local at Nuevo Toledo. He is a loyal fan towards Cuervos FC and has contributed help towards Chava and Isabel.
- Juan Pablo de Santiago as Tony Álvarez: Substitute of the Cuervos who made his way into the main lineup by hooking up Goyo with Susanita. (season 1-2)
- Luis Fernando Padilla as Beto: Chava's publicist recommended by Hugo Sanchéz.
- Eileen Yañez as Ximena Suárez: Moisés wife who neglects his football career in Cuervos. (season 1)
- Gutemberg Brito as Rio: A Portuguese player of Cuervos who occasionally clashes with Potro. (season 1-3)
- Oscar Olivares as Susanita: A transgender prostitute who pretended to be Tony's mother under Tony's request. (season 1-3)
- Claudia Vega as Vanessa Iglesias (née Villalobos): Doting mother of Chava who overindulges him regularly.
  - Karen Leone plays a younger version of Vanessa. (season 3)
- Verónica Terán as Gloria: Isabel's mother who is divorced with Salvador Iglesias Sr.
  - Mariana Cabrera plays a younger version of Gloria. (season 3)
- Gustavo Ganem as Uncle Luis: Salvador Iglesias Sr.'s brother who runs Iglesias industries and acts as financial consultant of the Cuervos FC. (Recurring seasons 1-3, Special Performances in Season 4)
  - Mario Moreno del Moral plays a younger version of him. (season 3)
- Juan Luis Orendain as Abraham: A lawyer who handles Iglesias families' legal matters.
- Sofía Niño de Rivera as Emilia: Isabel's best friend who struggles with her family life. She provides the emotional support for Isabel during her tough times.
- Constantino Caso as Juan Manuel Gaspar: An executive of Televisol who later owns Tarantula FC in addition to being a part of the football league. (season 2-4)
- Sebastian Moncayo as Javier Maldonado: An executive of Maxivision who is a part of the football league. (season 2-4)
- Mauro Mauad as Federico "Fede" Marchetta: The third coach assigned to Cuervos FC since Goyo's discharge by Chava. An expert in his profession, he helped in leading Cuervos back to the first division. (season 2-4)
- Guillermo Dorantes as Julito Cervera: A naturally talented forward recruited by Felix to form his own team, Carneros FC. He is later borrowed by Chava, Isabel, and Fede to reform Cuervos FC lineup in order to play in the primary division. (season 2-4)
- Tomás Goros as Armando Cantú: Isabel's protective and doting father who is the president at Cantumex and owns a share at ESTV. He spoils his daughter to the point that put him at odds with the Iglesias family, especially Chava and Isabel. (season 3-4)
- David Medel as Javier Pizzaro: Another famous soccer player sought by Chava. Unlike Aitor, he has a strict attitude and loathes Chava and his teammates for their unprofessional behavior. (season 3-4)
- Raúl Briones as José "El Pepenador" Morales: A goalkeeper bought by Chava, Isabel and Fede in order to play in the primary division. He worked in his family garbage disposal business prior of being brought to Cuervos FC. (season 3-4)
- Markín López as Benito "El Zombie" Guerrero: A midfielder bought by Chava, Isabel and Fede in order to play in the primary division. He primarily shows pacifistic attitude and remained to be loyal towards Cuervos FC. (season 3-4)
- Renato Gutz as Axel Carmenara: A forward player bought by Chava, Isabel, and Fede in order to play in the primary division. He is the son of Rodrigo Carmenara, previous player of Cuervos FC. He often shows pompous attitude and idolizes Aitor. (season 3-4)
- Pablo Astiazarán as Email Trujillo: A proficient forward brought to Cuervos FC after being blacklisted by the league. He is a devout Catholic and clashed often with Aitor. (season 4)

=== Special performances ===
- Mark Alazraki as Sam (a.k.a. "Bad Commentator")
- Francisco "Sopitas" Alanís as Sopitas (a.k.a. "Good Commentator")
- Luis Rabágo as Salvador Iglesias Sr.: Chava and Isabel's father who died due to cardiac arrest. He is the former president of Cuervos FC who is respected greatly by his peers and family. (season 1 and 4)
  - Moisés Arizmendi plays a younger version of him. (season 3)
- Carlos Bardem as Eliseo Canales: A powerful businessman who runs several soccer teams and players from the shadows. Felix is forced to engage with him, which allows direct influence on the team.
- Emilio Guerrero as Goyo: The Cuervos' coach, with whom Chava conflicts on how to direct the players on the field.
- Luis Fernandez-Gil as Ricky Lamas: A multi-millionaire entrepreneur who Chava meets on a party in Acapulco. He is surprisingly perceptive and cunning behind his eccentric behavior. (season 2 and 4)
- Javier Santa Rita as Jose Luis Lavalle: A journalist who seeks to expose Chava's scandal.
- Paco Mauri as Father Zeferino: A bishop at the Nuevo Toledo cathedral.
- José Carlos Rodríguez as Freddy Pausini: The first coach assigned by Felix after Goyo's discharge by Chava. (season 1)
- Ricardo Mestre as Guillo, one of the friends of Chava. (season 1-2)
- Ricardo Polanco as Pollo, one of the friends of Chava. (season 1-2)
- Jonathan Levit as Walter Bazaar: Chava's role model whom Chava quotes in most occasions.
- Harrison Jones as "Greek Soccer Team Captain", having a pool party with his friend Moises.

== Development ==
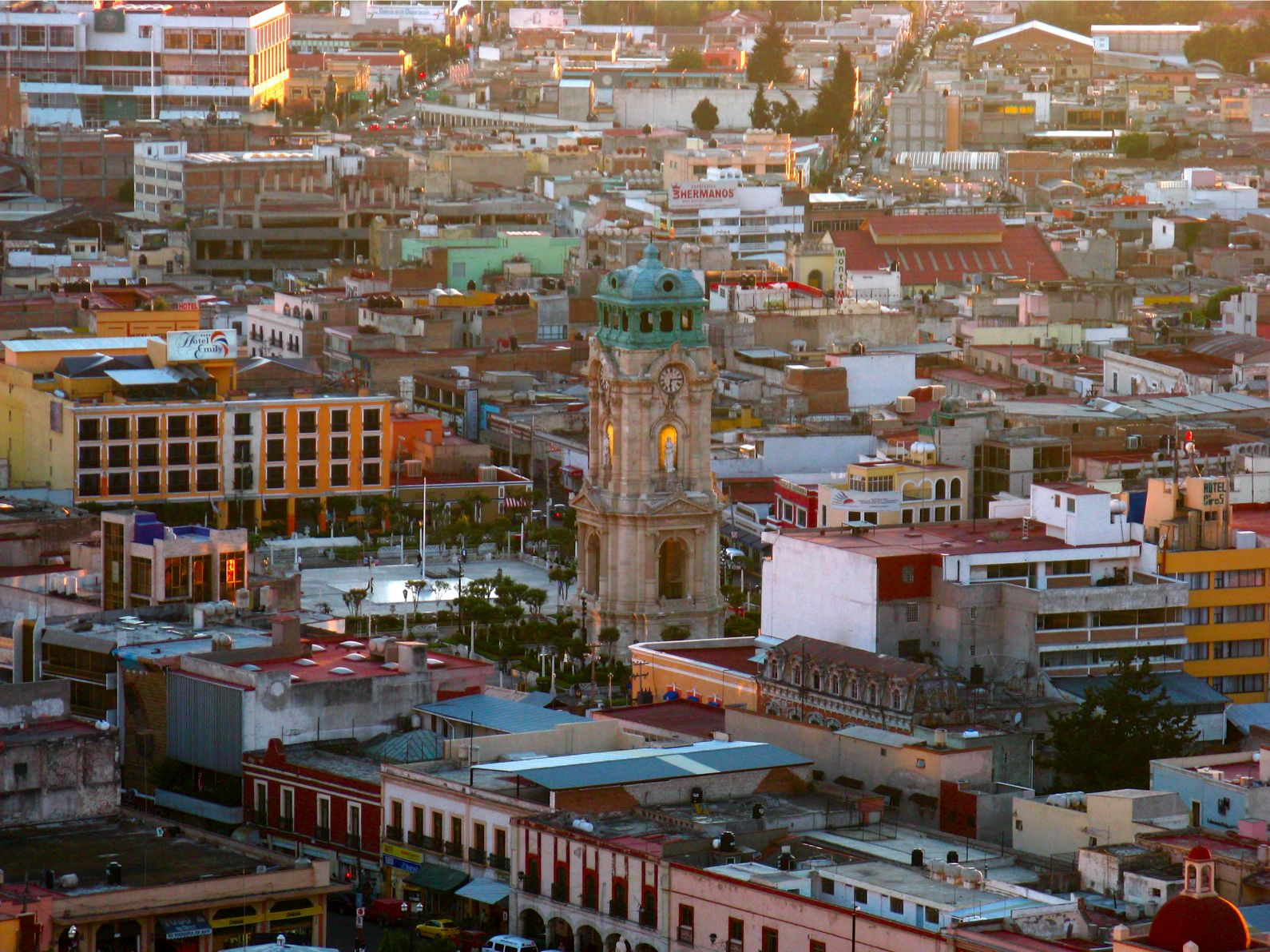
Club de Cuervos is filmed in Pachuca, Hidalgo (Pachuca's historic center pictured)

Hoping to expand further into the Latin American television market by producing a local show, Netflix contacted Mexican director Gary Alazraki, who had directed the 2013 film The Noble Family, which became the highest-grossing Mexican film of all time. In response Alazraki and his friend Mike Lam began developing a show with the idea of "Game of Thrones set in the world of soccer", focusing on family members fighting over leadership of the team. Alazraki and Lam decided to hire a writer who had experience with American cable shows, and decided on Jay Dyer, writer of Californication and Andy Richter Controls the Universe, despite his limited knowledge of soccer and the Spanish language. The staff held a meeting in Los Angeles in which Alazraki educated the others about Mexico and the commentary he wanted to make about class and gender relations in the show. The following month, the team traveled to Pachuca, Hidalgo to become immersed in the culture, meeting with soccer players and people from a wide variety of economic backgrounds.

== Reception ==
Club de Cuervos has received positive reviews from critics. The first season has a score of 80% on Rotten Tomatoes. Xaque Gruber of The Huffington Post writes that the series "oscillates brilliantly from laugh-out-loud comedy to poignant drama, while never dipping into Latin stereotypes or telenovela melodrama."

In October 2023, a club styled after Cuervos FC, including adopting their crow emblem and bearing the name Club de Cuervos, was announced for the Américas Kings League during its launch. The Hispanic American league is a seven-a-side league with special rules and is the second Kings League following the original in Spain that retired Barcelona defender Gerard Piqué, a 2010 World Cup winner with Spain, founded and presides over. Treviño and Méndez reprised their roles as Isabel and Chava in the club's announcement trailer also featuring Piqué. Mexican footballing TikToker Mercedes Roa is the club's president.

== Series overview ==
Season	Episodes	Originally released
1	13	August 7, 2015
2	10	December 10, 2016
3	10	September 29, 2017
4	12	January 26, 2019

== Episodes ==
=== Season 1 (2015) ===
No. overall	No. in season	Title	Directed by	Written by	Original release date
1	1	"Be a Captain"	Gaz Alazraki	Michael Lam & Jay Dyer	August 7, 2015
2	2	"We Make Soap"	Gaz Alazraki	Jay Dyer	August 7, 2015
3	3	"Uniform Response"	Gaz Alazraki	Alessia Costantini	August 7, 2015
4	4	"Slap"	Gaz Alazraki	Russell Eida	August 7, 2015
5	5	"Barriers to Exit"	Gaz Alazraki	Alessia Costantini	August 7, 2015
6	6	"Lucky to Play"	Gaz Alazraki	Russell Eida	August 7, 2015
7	7	"Our Guggenheim"	Gaz Alazraki	Gaz Alazraki & Alessia Costantini	August 7, 2015
8	8	"Aitor"	Carlos Armella	Michael Lam	August 7, 2015
9	9	"Spanish Fever"	Gaz Alazraki	Jay Dyer	August 7, 2015
10	10	"New Dick in Town"	Gaz Alazraki	Michael Svoboda	August 7, 2015
11	11	"Push"	Gaz Alazraki	Alessia Costantini	August 7, 2015
12	12	"Happy Birthday Mr. President"	Gaz Alazraki	Alessia Costantini	August 7, 2015
13	13	"Iglesias vs. Iglesias"	Gaz Alazraki	Jay Dyer	August 7, 2015

=== Season 2 (2016) ===
No. overall	No. in season	Title	Directed by	Written by	Original release date
14	1	"Descenso"	Mariana Chenillo	Jay Dyer	December 10, 2016
15	2	"Welcome to Second"	Carlos Armella	Nicki Renna	December 10, 2016
16	3	"Who Are You Looking For?"	Luis Gerardo Méndez & Salvador Espinosa	Russell Eida	December 10, 2016
17	4	"Ho Oponopono"	Carlos Armella	Mike Lam	December 10, 2016
18	5	"Matahari"	Carlos Armella	Gaz Alazraki	December 10, 2016
19	6	"The Oasis in the Desert"	Mariana Chenillo	Nicki Renna	December 10, 2016
20	7	"La Salvadora"	Gaz Alazraki	Jay Dyer	December 10, 2016
21	8	"The Truce"	Mariana Chenillo	Mike Lam	December 10, 2016
22	9	"The Curse of the Black Feather"	Gaz Alazraki	Russell Eida	December 10, 2016
23	10	"Iglesias vs. Iglesias 2"	Gaz Alazraki	Jay Dyer	December 10, 2016

=== Season 3 (2017) ===
No. overall	No. in season	Title	Directed by	Written by	Original release date
24	1	"The Third Generation"	Gaz Alazraki	Jay Dyer	September 29, 2017
25	2	"The Treaty of Versailles 14"	Mariana Chenillo	James Eagan	September 29, 2017
26	3	"The Leftovers"	Mariana Chenillo	Russell Eida	September 29, 2017
27	4	"Business or Pleasure?"	Mariana Chenillo	Matt Hausfater	September 29, 2017
28	5	"The Road Back"	Gaz Alazraki	James Eagan	September 29, 2017
29	6	"Our Cuau"	Gaz Alazraki	Matt Hausfater & Michael Lam	September 29, 2017
30	7	"Church and State"	Luis Gerardo Méndez	Russell Eida	September 29, 2017
31	8	"Puebla…"	Salvador Espinosa	Marcos Bucay	September 29, 2017
32	9	"Girl, Interrupted"	Salvador Espinosa	Jay Dyer	September 29, 2017
33	10	"The Heart of Nuevo Toledo"	Gaz Alazraki	James Eagan & Gaz Alazraki	September 29, 2017

=== Season 4 (2019) ===
No. overall	No. in season	Title	Directed by	Written by	Original release date
34	1	"Diego Villalobos"	Luis Gerardo Méndez	Russel Eida	January 26, 2019
Amid hostility from the public about his father, Chava ponders a name change. The Iglesias family debate selling the Cuervos to pay off their debt.
35	2	"You've Got Email"	Salvador Espinosa	Matt Patterson	January 26, 2019
When Gaspar steals players from the Cuervos, Isabel seeks help from unlikely sources. Chava's plan to raise money is foiled by a person from his past.
36	3	"Valle de Silicon"	Salvador Espinosa	Matt Patterson	January 26, 2019
Potro helps Isabel block Fede's romantica advances. Chava launches Cuervos TV. Email's religion causes conflict with Aitor. Gaspar's sabotage continues.
37	4	"The Slut of Nuevo Toledo"	Salvador Espinosa	Chris Luccy	January 26, 2019
Mary Luz enters World Cup negotiations. Chava gets creative when the Cuervos are moved to a 7 a.m. time slot. Isabel and Fede's tryst hits the press.
38	5	"Cyrano de Bergerac"	Salvador Espinosa	Marcos Bucay & Brett Isaacson	January 26, 2019
Isabel secretly helps Potro improve his coaching. fed up with all the bad press about the team, Chava decides they should use it to their advantage.
39	6	"The Black Plague"	Roberto Sneider	Gaz Alazraki	January 26, 2019
Chava urges Isabel to lean in to her "promiscuous" reputation. Email worries he's been found out. The Cuervos get a new coach and face the Tarantulas.
40	7	"Four Minor Miracles"	Roberto Sneider	Matt Patterson	January 26, 2019
When the Iglesias bank accounts are frozen, the players leverage social media to raise money, but their lack of focus affects a qualifying match.
41	8	"Concentration Camp"	Roberto Sneider	Marcos Bucay	January 26, 2019
The Cuervos go on a retreat to unplug from social media, but Isabel and Rafa's feud and a confession from Email threaten the team-building dynamic.
42	9	"Something About Mary Luz"	Roberto Sneider & Salvador Espinosa & Gaz Alazraki	Marcos Bucay	January 26, 2019
Paty and Chava produce a documentary that could change the course of fate for the Cuervos. Mary Luz charms Maldonado to help take down Gaspar.
43	10	"Two for the Road"	Salvador Espinosa	Lauren Bachelis	January 26, 2019
Traveling together to the semifinals, Isabel and Rafa are "Two for the Road", reflecting on their first meeting in 2006 and their decade-long marriage.
44	11	"A Trip to the Moon"	Salvador Espinosa	Russel Eida	January 26, 2019
After Chava kidnaps a reporter, his family asks him to do the unthinkable. Gaspar calls the authorities on Mary Luz. The Cuervos play in the semifinals.
45	12	"Todos Somos Cuervos"	Gaz Alazraki	Gaz Alazraki	January 26, 2019
As the finals arrive, the Cuervos and Nuevo Toledo are on the brink of ruin. Chava and Isabel must pull off their greatest scheme yet to save them.
