= Marcela Guirado =

Mexican actress and singer (born 1989)

- Born: 24 October 1989 (age 35); Guadalajara, Jalisco, Mexico
- Occupation(s): Actress, singer
- Years active: 2003–present
- Spouse: Vince Miranda (m. 2016; div. 2019)

Marcela Guirado (born 24 October 1989) is a Mexican actress and singer. Born in Guadalajara, Jalisco, Mexico, Guirado is best known for her works in telenovelas with the Mexican television channel TV Azteca. Recently she has been made known to the Latin American market with the telenovela of Telemundo, Silvana sin lana, and with the series based on the boxer Julio César Chávez entitled El César.

== Personal life ==
In November 2016, Guirado married American actor and singer Vince Miranda after a three-year relationship. They announced they were getting a divorce in July 2019.

== Filmography ==
Film roles
Year	Title	Roles	Notes
2003	Fantasías	Jéssica	
2007	Cuando las cosas suceden	María Serratos	
2012	El secreto del medallón de Jade	Katy	
2013	Nosotros los Nobles	Mara	
2018	Todo mal	Viviana	
2019	¿Conoces a Tomás?	Fernanda	

Television roles
Year	Title	Roles	Notes
2009	Pasión morena	Georgia Madrigal	
2010–2012	Soy tu fan	Ana	22 episodes
2010	Prófugas del destino	Lucero Acuña / Lucero Mendoza Rodríguez	
2013	Vivir a destiempo	Tania Bermúdez Duarte	
2015	Así en el barrio como en el cielo	María López	120 episodes
2016	Hasta que te conocí	Claudette	2 episodes
2016–2018	Sr. Ávila	Natalia	Episodes: "Tha Hacking Bells" and "El Hobby de Dios"
2016–2017	Silvana sin lana	María José "Majo" Villaseñor	120 episodes
2017	El César	Amalia	26 episodes
2018	Tres Milagros	Milagros Valdapeña	
2018	Luis Miguel: The Series	Verónica Castro	2 episodes
2019	La negociadora	Abril Islas	
2020-2021	Selena: The Series	Servant girl and Verónica Castro	2 episodes
