= José Antonio Martínez =

José Antonio Martínez may refer to:

- José Antonio Martínez de Aldunate (1731–1811), Chilean prelate of the Roman Catholic Church
- José Antonio Martínez Bayó (1952–2020), Spanish athlete
- José Antonio Martínez Gil (born 1993), Spanish footballer
- José Antonio Martínez Soler (born 1947), Spanish newspaperman
- Antonio José Martínez (1793–1867), New Mexican priest, politician, and educator

== See also ==
- José Martínez (disambiguation)
