= Jesús Zavala =

Jesús Zavala may refer to:

- Jesús Zavala (footballer) (born 1987), Mexican footballer
- Jesús Zavala (actor) (born 1991), Mexican actor and singer
