= Luis Martínez =

Luis Martínez may refer to:

== Arts and Entertainment ==
- Lilí Martínez (1915–1990), Cuban pianist and composer
- Luis A. Martínez (1869–1909), Ecuadorian writer and painter
- Luis Enrique Martínez (musician) (c. 1923–1995), Colombian musician and songwriter

== Politicians ==
- Luis de Aliaga Martínez (1560–1626), Grand Inquisitor of Spain, 1619–1621
- Luis Arráez Martínez (1897–1940), Spanish politician
- Luis Martínez Saravia (1904–1974), Chilean politician
- Luis Martínez Urrutia (1917–1985), Chilean politician
- Luis Martínez Villicaña (1939–2011), Mexican politician, governor of Michoacán, 1986–1988
- Luis Martínez Noval (1948–2013), Spanish economist and politician
- Luis Antonio Martínez Armengol (born 1952), Mexican politician
- Luis Rodolfo Enríquez Martínez (born 1970), Mexican politician
- Luis Estrella Martínez (born 1971), associate justice of the Supreme Court of Puerto Rico

== Religious figures ==
- Luis María Martínez (1881–1956), Catholic archbishop of Mexico
- Luis Aponte Martínez (1922–2012), Puerto Rican cardinal and Archbishop of San Juan

== Sportspeople ==
=== Association football ===
- Luis Enrique (born 1970), Spanish footballer
- Luís Martínez (born 1976), Costa Rican in the 2001 UNCAF Nations Cup squads
- Luís Fernando Martinez (born 1980), Brazilian footballer
- Neco Martínez (born 1982), Colombian footballer
- Luis Martínez (footballer, born 1987) (born 1987), Mexican footballer
- Luis Martínez (footballer, born 1990) (born 1990), Mexican footballer
- Luis Martínez (footballer, born 1991) (born 1991), Guatemalan footballer
- Luis Martínez (footballer, born 1999) (born 1999), Mexican footballer

=== Baseball ===
- Luis Martínez (pitcher) (born 1980), Dominican baseball player
- Luis Martinez (catcher) (born 1985), American baseball player

=== Combat sports ===
- Luis Martínez (Spanish boxer) (1925–2008), Spanish boxer
- Luis Martínez (judoka) (born 1965), Puerto Rican judoka
- Luis Martínez (Cuban boxer) (born 1955), Cuban boxer
- Luis Bernardo Martínez, Spanish wrestler
- Damian Priest (born 1982), American professional wrestler born Luis Martinez

=== Other sports ===
- Luis Martínez (runner) (born 1966), Guatemalan long-distance runner
- Luis Martínez (sailor) (born 1973), Spanish Olympic sailor
- Luis Martínez (sport shooter) (born 1976), Spanish Olympic sport shooter
- Luis David Martínez (born 1989), Venezuelan tennis player
- Luis Rojas Martinez (born 1990), Venezuelan swimmer
- Luis Martínez (swimmer) (born 1995), Guatemalan swimmer

== Others ==
- Club Deportivo Luis Cruz Martínez, a Chilean football club
- Luis Martinez Alonzo (died 2012), a Guatemalan logger shot in Belize

== See also ==
- José Luis Martínez (disambiguation)
- Sabu Martinez (Louis Martinez, 1930–1979), American conga player and percussionist
