= Death of Paulette Gebara Farah =

Disappearance and death of a girl in Mexico

Paulette Gebara Farah
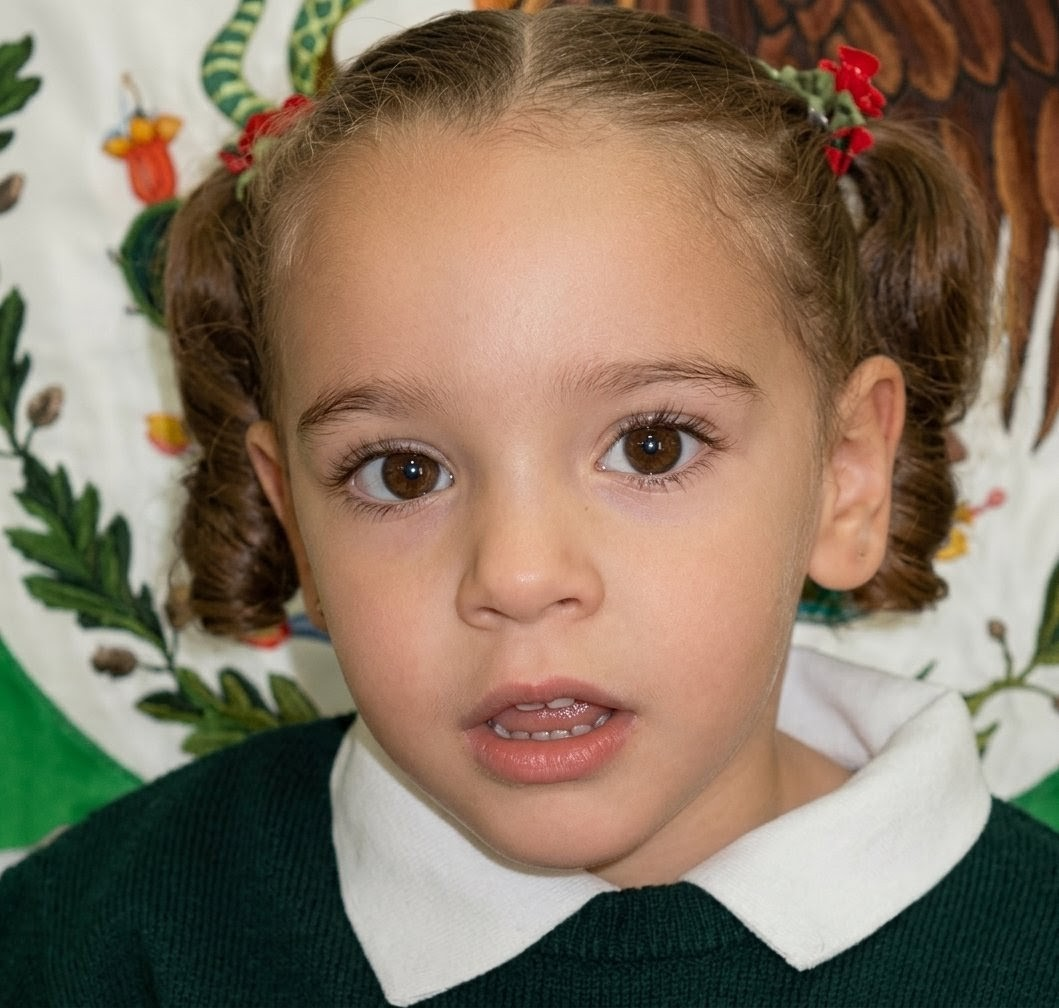
- Paulette in January 2010
- Born: 20 July 2005; Huixquilucan, State of Mexico, Mexico
- Disappeared: 22 March 2010; Interlomas, Huixquilucan, State of Mexico, Mexico
- Died: c. 22 March 2010 (aged 4)
- Cause of death: Asphyxia by obstruction of the nasal cavities and thorax-abdominal compression
- Body discovered: 31 March 2010; Huixquilucan, State of Mexico, Mexico

In the early morning of 22 March 2010, Paulette Gebara Farah, a four-year-old Mexican girl with disabilities, disappeared from her bedroom in her family's apartment, located in a private building in the upscale residential area of Interlomas, in Huixquilucan, State of Mexico. Her family, of wealthy background, launched a massive search campaign through various media outlets. Nine days later, a smell of putrefaction began emanating from her room, and in the early morning of 31 March, her body was discovered wrapped in her bedsheets and wedged between the mattress and the foot of the bed. In that place: her mother had given interviews, experts from various agencies and search dogs had entered, and even Amanda de la Rosa, a friend of Paulette's mother, had slept there without noticing the body.

Her death was ruled an accident, and it was concluded that she had died during the night after rolling over in bed and falling into the cramped space at the base of the mattress. On 6 April 2010, she was buried at the Panteón Francés de San Joaquín, before being exhumed and cremated seven years later, on 3 May 2017.

== Chronology ==
=== Disappearance ===
Disappearance of Paulette Gebara Farah
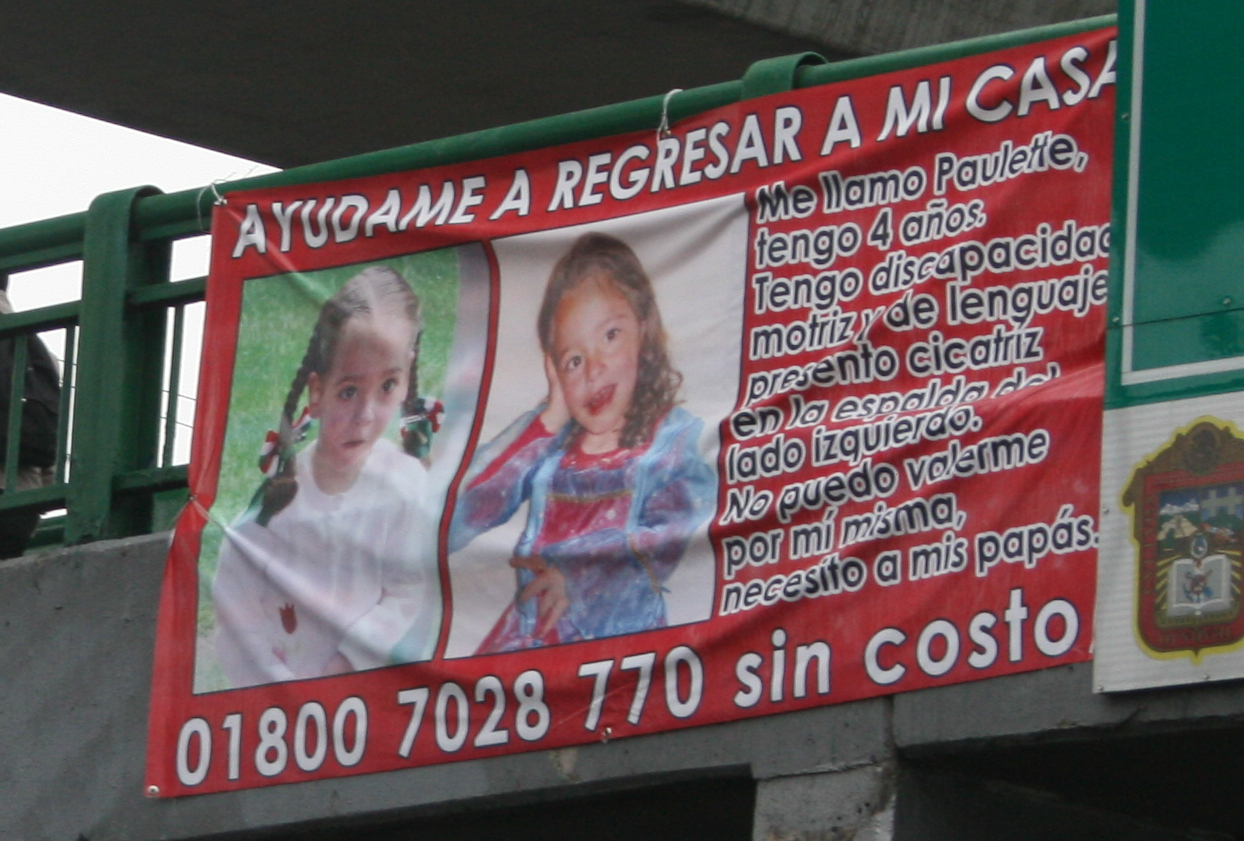
- Search canvas with photographs of Paulette (Note: Text in Spanish reads, "Help me get back home. My name is Paulette, I am 4 years old. I have a motor and speech disability, and I have a scar on the left side of my back. I can't take care of myself, I need my parents. 01800-7028-770 toll-free.")
- Date: 21 March 2010 – 31 March 2010
- Location: Interlomas, Huixquilucan, State of Mexico, Mexico
- First reporter: Erika Casimiro

On the night of Sunday, 21 March 2010, Paulette, along with her sister and father, arrived at their apartment located in the luxury residential complex Porto Vita 2 in Interlomas, Huixquilucan, State of Mexico, after the three of them had returned from a trip to Valle de Bravo. The mother of the girls, Lizette Farah, stayed up late to put them to bed. On the morning of 22 March, one of Gebara's nannies, Erika, entered the room to wake Gebara, but could not find her. She notified Farah and they both began searching the building. Mauricio Gebara informed his sister of the disappearance of his daughter, who informed Huixquilucan authorities. Later, the mayor, Alfredo del Mazo Maza, notified the Attorney General of the State of Mexico, Alberto Bazbaz.

After the initial search of the apartment building, Paulette's family claimed they could not find her. There were no signs of theft or kidnapping; the locks were intact, as well as the windows and doors. The housing complex had surveillance, but no evidence of Paulette leaving or being taken was found. Paulette could not go out alone, as she had a motor and language disability.

=== Search and false statements ===
That afternoon, the attorney general released a poster with a photo of Paulette and information about her age, appearance, and physical disabilities. Gebara's aunt, Arlette Farah, sent emails and uploaded a photo to social media, where the news quickly spread, prompting a large response. In the evening, Lizette Farah released a message on television to the alleged abductor asking that her daughter be returned to her, saying that she could be left in a shopping mall or a crowded place, and there would be no consequences. After the announcement, she distributed flyers with Paulette's face, put up billboards, and placed advertisements on television and public transport.

Mauricio also appeared in the media, asking that his daughter be returned to him. He recalled that he had gone out to work on the morning of 22 March, when Paulette had apparently disappeared. On 29 March, the attorney general announced that Paulette's parents, and Erika and Martha Casimiro, Paulette's nannies, would be placed under a restriction order, due to falsehoods and inconsistencies in their statements.

"Each one of them at a certain moment have falsified their statements, which has made it difficult to know the truth of the facts and clarify a firm line of investigation," said then Attorney General Alberto Bazbaz.

On 30 March, Paulette's parents spent several hours at the police station before being transferred to a hotel to comply with the restriction order. The same day, police experts placed blankets at the home for a reconstruction of events.

=== Discovery of her body and autopsy ===
On 31 March, at around 2:00 AM, Paulette's remains were found in her bedroom. In the leaked video of investigators, one voice is heard saying, "she was severely beaten" whilst examining the stained sheets. However, this statement was almost immediately refuted by General Attorney Bazbaz. Paulette had accidentally died due to "mechanical asphyxia due to obstruction of the nasal cavities and thorax-abdominal compression".

An autopsy revealed that Paulette slept with an "orthopaedic cloth" over her mouth, which was placed every night to prevent her from sleeping with her mouth open; that her body was not manipulated after her death; and that she had eaten at least five hours before her death. The body had two segments of rectangular adhesive cloth in vertical position on both cheeks, in addition to signs of a blow to the left elbow and knee. The official findings, however, indicated no signs of physical or sexual violence. The autopsy also established that her death occurred between five and nine days before the analysis was made, establishing that she could have died on the first day. This was reported on 31 March, although they did not reveal the exact date and hour of her death.

The official report also said that they had found no traces of drugs or toxic substances in the body that could have affected the girl's consciousness. The conclusion was that Paulette, "by her own means", rolled over while sleeping and accidentally fell headlong into a space at the foot of her bed, where she died of asphyxiation, and subsequently remained unnoticed for nine days.

=== Aftermath and closure of investigations ===
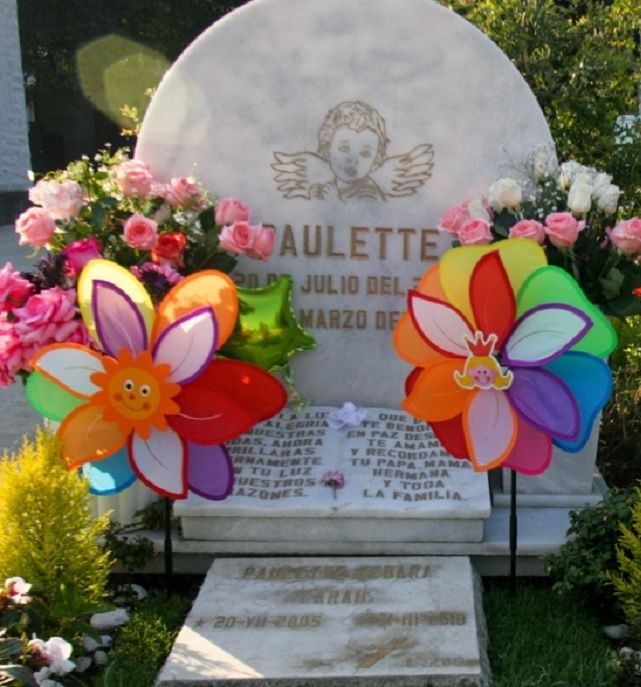
Grave in which Gebara was buried inside the Panteón Francés de San Joaquín, located in Mexico City. She remained there for seven years, before being exhumed and cremated in 2017

On 3 April, Farah initiated an amparo proceeding against the restriction order, claiming that she had not been involved in the events that caused her daughter's death. Specialists said that Farah suffered from personality disorders. During the procedure Farah became subject to indictment. On 4 April, a judge granted freedom to Paulette's parents and nannies. Mauricio Gebara left his hotel at 10:20; Farah left hers at 11:00; and the nannies, Erika and Martha Casimiro, at noon. None of them could leave the country due to the inquiries. On 5 April, in separate interviews, Gebara and Farah accused each other; Farah claimed that her husband blamed her for Paulette's death, whilst Gebara claimed that the death could not have been a simple accident, and that he could not completely trust his wife.

On 6 April, Paulette's body was buried at the Panteón Francés de San Joaquín in Mexico City. The funeral procession was headed by Farah without any member of the Gebara family in attendance due to an "agreement".

On 7 April, the Gebara family denied Farah's request to see her other daughter, Lizette, who had stayed with her father's family since 4 April. On 10 May, the Attorney General of the Federal District, who also collaborated in the case at the request of her counterpart in the State of Mexico, granted the custody of Paulette's sister to Farah, who brought a complaint against her husband demanding custody of the girl. On 26 May, although Bazbaz defended the investigation and conclusions of the case, he resigned his position as Attorney General of the State of Mexico, saying that an attorney general needs confidence to act effectively, and that he had lost this confidence due to the questioning of his actions in the investigation of the death of Paulette Gebara Farah.

Seven years later, on 3 May 2017, Paulette's body was exhumed and cremated as authorities considered that her remains were no longer evidence to continue investigations. Once this was done, the case was practically closed, as it was never spoken of again.

== Controversies ==
=== Statements by Paulette's nannies ===
Paulette's nannies, Erika and Martha Casimiro, insisted that the girl's body was not under her mattress, with Martha stating:

"I looked in the bathroom, under the bed and in the closet. I saw that she was not there, and I also went into the bedroom of the parents to look for her, to the bedroom of the other girl [Paulette's older sister, Lizette], and from there we started looking for her again. And I went back to look for her in the bedroom,"

and Erika stating:

"In fact, if it had been like that, I think we would have noticed, since thousands of people came to look for her, the bed was made, I never saw the mattress pulled back, I did not see a bundle or anything, it does not make sense to me that the body could have been there since Monday."

=== Amanda de la Rosa ===
Amanda de la Rosa, a close friend of Lizette Farah, was allowed to live in the Gebaras' apartment for several days immediately following the girl's disappearance. Amanda slept in Paulette's room, which was not secured by the authorities. During her stay, the bed was made on a daily basis, and nobody noticed the girl's body nor the bloody stains on the sheets as they appeared on the forensic video. As a result, Amanda was also investigated as a possible suspect, but no charges were filed.

=== Forensics video ===
Nine days after her disappearance, a team of three forensic experts entered Paulette's room at 2:00 AM. and walked to the bed and began taking measurements, loudly stating its characteristics and recording their activities on video. At one point, one of them declared twice that Paulette was "severely beaten" to death, and a few moments after, the forensic expert to his right removed the bed's blanket to reveal two large bloodstains, one of them the size of an adult's head. The same man walked to the front of the bed, with the help of another forensic expert, and removed all the sheets to reveal Paulette's corpse, partially hidden on one side of the mattress.

Although the local authorities gave the video to the press as a document to prove how the body was found, there are several doubts about its authenticity. Most experts agree that it is a re-enactment, and not a real-time event, which may explain how one of the forensic experts could know that Paulette was beaten before any evidence was found. It would also explain the placement of the camera, and the position of the forensic experts in the exact place to be able to show all the elements to the public without any obstruction. It has also been noted that none of those present seems to show any surprise when discovering the body, and they even continue narrating the events with a mechanical voice, as if they were repeating a script. The time the video was recorded was very unusual as well. Such legal procedures are usually performed in the daytime.

=== Recording between Paulette's mother and older sister ===
During the investigation of the case, a recording between Farah and Lizette was released, in which Farah instructs her daughter to not say anything of Paulette's disappearance, so that they would not be blamed.

"[Lizette] asks, 'Why mom?' and [Farah] replies, 'Because otherwise they will blame us for stealing her or that you took her away to be stolen.'"

At first Farah denied this, saying that the recording was edited so it sounded like she was telling her daughter to hide any information. Later, however, she accepted that these were the words she said, stating, "I had the conversation with my daughter, but not in the context they showed it."

=== Paulette's pajamas ===
In 2010, a YouTube video titled The Strange Case of Paulette's Pajamas became a point of interest and was spread via social media. The video compares photographs of Paulette's body dressed in blue and red reindeer pajamas with an interview with Farah recorded several days before the girl's body was found, in which the same pajamas appear in the girl's room. After this discovery was made public, the television network aired the footage without cuts, including all preparation prior to the interview. As Farah and the interviewing reporter examine various items owned by Paulette, the aforementioned pajamas appear. When asked about them, Farah stated that the pajamas belong to Paulette's sister.

Despite this claim, these pajamas remained among Paulette's belongings, and as they could be seen in subsequent interviews in Paulette's closet. The authorities were never informed by the family that they had a second set of pajamas identical to the one the girl was wearing at the time of her disappearance. It is unknown what happened to these pajamas.

== In popular culture ==
In 2010, Amanda de la Rosa published the book ¿Dónde está Paulette? (spanish for, Where is Paulette?), for which she recounted her feelings about being so close to the case. Her work was poorly received, and was described as "opportunistic for taking advantage of the situation", especially for releasing it while Paulette's death was still very recent.

In 2014, her case was adapted for the film La dictadura perfecta.

In 2020, the streaming company Netflix produced the series Historia de un crimen: La búsqueda, which focuses on her case, dramatizing how things could have happened in real life.

== See also ==
- Killing of JonBenét Ramsey
- Disappearance of Madeleine McCann
- List of unusual deaths in the 21st century
- List of solved missing person cases (2010s)
