= Paquita la del Barrio (TV series) =

- Genre: Drama
- Starring: Andrea Ortega-Lee
- Country of origin: Mexico
- Original language: Spanish
- No. of episodes: 74

Production
- Camera setup: Multi-camera

Original release
- Network: Imagen Televisión
- Release: April 25 – August 4, 2017

Paquita la del Barrio (stylized Las verdades bien cantadas, Paquita la del Barrio) is a Mexican drama developed by Sony Pictures Television and Imagen Televisión. It premiered on April 25, 2017 and ended on August 4, 2017. The series tells the story of the life of the singer Paquita la del Barrio during her childhood and adulthood.

== Plot ==
It tells the story of a woman born in poverty who, with effort and after suffering disappointments and failures, finally achieved musical success and fame to become one of the most known singers in all of Mexico or, as some call her, La Reina del Pueblo (The Queen of the People).

== Cast ==
- Andrea Ortega-Lee as Paquita la del Barrio
- Erick Chapa as Camilo
- Miguel Ángel Biaggio as Jorge
- Lambda García as Antonio
- Carlos Espejel as Eduardo Toscano
- Sofía Garza as Viola
- Gloria Stalina as Clara
- Marcia Coutiño as Lucía
- Andrés Pardavé as Hernando
- Paloma Woolrich as Engracia
- Milton Cortéz as Gerardo
- Marissa Saavedra as Aurora
- Emilio Guerrero as Padre Fertxu
- Carmen Madrid as Rosa
- Alejandro de Marino as Mario / Marina
- Joaquín Ferreira as Alfonso
- Ariane Pellicer as Griselda
- Fabiana Perzabal as Rafaela
- Mimi Morales as Carmina

== Awards and nominations ==
Year	Award	Category	Nominated	Result
2018	International Emmy Award	Best Telenovela	Paquita la del Barrio	Nominated
