= Tres milagros (Mexican TV series) =

- Genre: Drama
- Based on: Cuando quiero llorar no lloro by Miguel Otero Silva
- Directed by: Camilo Vega; Carlos Bolado
- Creative director: Marisa Pecanins
- Starring: Fátima Molina; Alexa Martín; Marcela Guirado; Joaquín Ferreira
- Theme music composer: Javier López; Alfonso Samos; Estela Redondo
- Opening theme: "La profecía" by Kenya Saiz and Isaias Hernández Achepe
- Country of origin: Mexico
- Original language: Spanish
- No. of seasons: 1
- No. of episodes: 55

Production
- Executive producers: Harold Sánchez; Angélica Guerra
- Camera setup: Multi-camera
- Production companies: Televisión Azteca; Sony Pictures Television

Original release
- Network: Azteca Uno
- Release: 12 March – 25 May 2018

Related
- Victorinos; Tres Milagros

Tres Milagros is a Mexican drama television series that premiered on Azteca Uno on 12 March 2018, and ended on 25 May 2018. Produced by Sony Pictures Television and Televisión Azteca based on the 1970 book Cuando quiero llorar no lloro ("When I want to cry, I don't") by Miguel Otero Silva, a Colombian version was made in 2011 with the name Tres Milagros.

== Plot ==
The series follows the lives of three young people who end up joining their destinies thanks to a prophecy, the prophecy says: "The day that Milagros meets Milagros and Milagros, Milagros and the love of Milagros, They will die". On September 18, 1985 there is a birth of three girls who are baptized with the same name. Catemaco's jaguar manages to see the connection between the three girls. and to his own sorrow he anticipates a prophecy. What will make the three girls start their lives and both fall in love with the same man, but only one of them will die.

== Cast ==
- Fátima Molina as Milagros Cruz "Nikita"
- Alexa Martín as Milagros Rendón
- Marcela Guirado as Milagros Valdapeña "Milú"
- Joaquín Ferreira as Fernando
- Brandon Peniche as Aquiles
- Cuauhtli Jiménez as Chemo
- Lucas Bernabé as Marcelo
- Gerardo Taracena as Julián Cruz
- Marissa Saavedra as Daniela Rendón
- Carlos Corona as Tomás Rendón
- Montserrat de León as Prudencia
- Luis Caballero as Ricardo Valdapeña
- Paula Serrano as Roberta Treviño de Valdapeña
- Giovanna Zacarías as Celina
- Shalim Ortiz as Brayan
- Mercedes Olea as Carmelita
- Regina Reynoso as Nayeli
- Sandra Kai as Ivonne Treviño
- Marco León as Salvador Rendón
- Héctor Holten as Álvaro Treviño
- Axel Alcántara as El Tripas
- Cristina Campuzano as Reina Delgadillo
- Yany Prado as Luz María "La Negra"
- Leticia Pedrajo as Señorita Treviño
- Marcela Alcaráz as Camila Ibargüengoitia
- Sharis Cid as Graciela

=== Special guest stars ===
- Arturo Peniche as Ulises Suárez

== Ratings ==
Viewership and ratings per season of Tres milagros
Season	Episodes	First aired		Last aired		Avg. viewers (millions)	18–49 rank
Season	Episodes	Date	Viewers (millions)	Date	Viewers (millions)	Avg. viewers (millions)	18–49 rank
1	55	12 March 2018	0.93	25 May 2018	0.99	0.82	TBD

== Episodes ==
No.	Title	Original release date	Mexico viewers (millions)
1	"Chapter 1"	12 March 2018	0.93
Despite the obstacles on the way, Daniela, Prudencia and Roberta give birth to their little ones; Milagros.
2	"Chapter 2"	13 March 2018	0.78
After 3 months, Julián manages to find the whereabouts of Milagros, but doesn't know where is Prudencia is.
3	"Chapter 3"	14 March 2018	1.00
9 years go by, while Milagros and Milú celebrate in the company of their family, Nikita asks only one wish, to see her mother again.
4	"Chapter 4"	15 March 2018	0.86
The destiny for each one of the three Miracles was different, but it's time for them to meet.
5	"Chapter 5"	16 March 2018	0.75
Milú's rebellion has no limits and will have no mercy on her aunt Ivonne.
6	"Chapter 6"	19 March 2018	0.74
Milagros, Nikita and Milú turn 18, all three celebrate in their own way. Milú is an accomplice in a robbery, she helped Nikita.
7	"Chapter 7"	20 March 2018	0.98
Doubts begin to emerge about Fernando's work. Milú learns that she will have a brother, it is the son that her aunt Ivonne is waiting for.
8	"Chapter 8"	21 March 2018	0.90
Milú and Marcelo manage to escape safely from the landing. Tomás finds Fernando's things, they argue and he makes him leave his house.
9	"Chapter 9"	22 March 2018	0.77
Milagros can not forgive her father for making Fernando leave. Nikita and Chemo make love but not everything will be rosy.
10	"Chapter 10"	23 March 2018	0.73
Milú plans to ruin Ivonne's night and Nikita will be involved. The actions of Tomás move him more and more away from his family.
11	"Chapter 11"	26 March 2018	0.94
Milú unmasks Ivonne and her own father in front of everyone. Chemo remembers what Bryan and his friends did to him, he can not be with Nikita.
12	"Chapter 12"	27 March 2018	0.76
Nikita will have the chance to take revenge on Bryan. Camila joins Milú and they play a bad joke on Ivonne. The spite of Milagros will take her to the limit.
13	"Chapter 13"	28 March 2018	0.87
Fernando does not intend to overlap the actions of Milú and returns Camila to his house. Bryan is missing and Nikita is the main suspect.
14	"Chapter 14"	29 March 2018	0.63
Fernando calls Nikita for a new job. Tomás discovers the romance between Milagros and Fernando.
15	"Chapter 15"	30 March 2018	0.78
The prophecy could be fulfilled at any time; Milagros, Milú and Nikita are in the same place with Fernando.
16	"Chapter 16"	2 April 2018	0.87
Fernando and Bryan return after 5 years. On the day of her graduation, Milagros will make a confession.
17	"Chapter 17"	3 April 2018	0.79
Milagros witnesses the robbery that Salvador commits, he became a delinquent. Ferras tests Nikita.
18	"Chapter 18"	4 April 2018	0.75
The return of Fernando will confuse Nikita's feelings. Milagros and the family face Salvador. Bryan wants to finish off Nikita.
19	"Chapter 19"	5 April 2018	0.80
Milú and Marcelo are warned that they have 24 hours to pay their debt. Chemo asks Nikita for marriage while she discovers that Nayeli is pregnant.
20	"Chapter 20"	6 April 2018	0.83
The relationship of Chemo and Nikita is stronger.
21	"Chapter 21"	9 April 2018	0.97
Nikita's decisions could get her in trouble with the Ferras. Milagros has a difficult first day at the Police Academy.
22	"Chapter 22"	10 April 2018	0.86
Fernando gets the money to pay Marcelo's ransom. Lieutenant Sánchez falls into contradictions when declaring against Milagros.
23	"Chapter 23"	11 April 2018	0.86
Nikita surprises Chemo in bed with La Negra. Nayeli confesses to the father of her son that she is pregnant, he rejects her and leaves.
24	"Chapter 24"	12 April 2018	0.78
The confrontation between El Ferras and Chemo is very intense, to the point where, in a struggle, a weapon is fired. Celina finds out about Nayeli's pregnancy and blames Nikita for what happened.
25	"Chapter 25"	13 April 2018	0.78
Bryan hits Nayeli to tell him the name of her son's father, everything happens while Milagros is sent to patrol the neighborhood.
26	"Chapter 26"	16 April 2018	0.80
While Nayeli loses her baby, Celina seeks a lawyer to get Bryan out of prison. By works of destiny, Roberta remembers the prophecy.
27	"Chapter 27"	17 April 2018	0.76
Milú and Nikita end up working together on a plan to cheat the casino for the alleged kidnapping of Marcelo. Milagros faces Fernando after discovering that he is a criminal.
28	"Chapter 28"	18 April 2018	0.78
Milagros discovers that Marcelo feigned his kidnapping. The Rendón family suffers for the death of Carmelita.
29	"Chapter 29"	19 April 2018	0.75
Nikita and Chemo live a honeymoon in advance, at last they know the sea. Fernando and Tomás finally forgive each other. Milú suffers an accident.
30	"Chapter 30"	20 April 2018	0.84
Fernando is jealous of seeing Aquiles frequenting Milagros. Milú is sedated and transferred to a psychiatric hospital.
31	"Chapter 31"	23 April 2018	0.71
Milú tries to escape from the psychiatric hospital, while Nikita enjoys a trip full of unexpected adventures.
32	"Chapter 32"	24 April 2018	0.68
Before the wedding of Nikita and Chemo, Bryan gets to spread his hatred, while Commander Aquiles talks about his intentions with Milagros.
33	"Chapter 33"	25 April 2018	0.92
The three Milagros will be very close to meeting.
34	"Chapter 34"	26 April 2018	0.87
Nikita is afraid that Bryan will attack again, while Milú gives herself up to passion with Fernando.
35	"Chapter 35"	27 April 2018	0.82
Milagros receives a news that collapses, while Nikita can not stand the bad memories of thinking about Bryan.
36	"Chapter 36"	30 April 2018	0.78
Milú looks for all the Milagros that were born on the same day as her, and Nikita faces Bryan.
37	"Chapter 37"	1 May 2018	0.75
Milagros is revealed to discover the murderer of her brother, while Nikita enters prison.
38	"Chapter 38"	2 May 2018	1.00
Milú is preparing everything to become the face of the city, while Fernando investigates what happened to Salvador.
39	"Chapter 39"	3 May 2018	0.91
Milú insists on looking for all the Milagros that were born on the same day as her, and Milagros is closer and closer to Commander Aquiles.
40	"Chapter 40"	4 May 2018	0.90
Nikita is on the defensive with Madona and rejects her protection, while Milagros receives several news, not all good news.
41	"Chapter 41"	7 May 2018	0.70
Commander Aquiles gives Milagros bad news, and Milú shows herself as she is in the Rostro de la Ciudad competition.
42	"Chapter 42"	8 May 2018	0.85
Nikita does not trust Madonna and all the kindness that she has shown her, while Milú goes after Milagros Rendón.
43	"Chapter 43"	9 May 2018	0.87
Not knowing the tragic fate they might have, Milú insists on meeting the other two Milagros, while Nikita discovers the story about her mother.
44	"Chapter 44"	10 May 2018	0.72
Commander Achilles returns to become the hero of Milagros. Milú steals the first battle from her strongest opponent, Tatiana
45	"Chapter 45"	11 May 2018	0.85
The beauty contest of the inmates is canceled after Graciela suffers an attack that costs her life, and Milagros enters a dangerous neighborhood with Aquiles.
46	"Chapter 46"	14 May 2018	0.84
Just in time, Commander Aquiles came to the rescue of Milagros and Nikita barely savors freedom and is already preparing for a lethal mission.
47	"Chapter 47"	15 May 2018	0.76
Milú refuses to earn points in the Rostro de la Ciudad competition in exchange for an afternoon of passion with a jury, meanwhile, Nikita savors her freedom.
48	"Chapter 48"	16 May 2018	0.84
Milú understands the tragic fate that awaits the Milagros if they meet, meanwhile Milagros and the commander Aquiles confirm their wedding.
49	"Chapter 49"	17 May 2018	0.73
The final of the Rostro de la Ciudad competition is very close, and Milú can’t take so much pressure, meanwhile, Milagros and Aquiles prepare their wedding.
50	"Chapter 50"	18 May 2018	0.78
The wedding day of Milagros and Aquiles has arrived. Milú leaves everyone speechless at the final of the Rostro de la Ciudad competition.
51	"Chapter 51"	21 May 2018	0.82
Milagros discovers more about the real Fernando and returns to Aquiles to apologize for abandoning him at the altar, Milú unleashes a scandal and Nikita manages to assassinate Rafael.
52	"Chapter 52"	22 May 2018	0.81
Milú tries to convince Fernando to stay together for their baby, while Nikita is furious because he does not reciprocate her love.
53	"Chapter 53"	23 May 2018	0.89
Fernando wants to leave the drug business because he cares about his future family, and Milagros resists questions about her loyalty when her relationship with her uncle is revealed.
54	"Chapter 54"	24 May 2018	0.72
The leader of the cartel has already put a price on the life of Milú, and it will be Nikita who takes care of everything, while Milagros discovers that her uncle will marry.
55	"Chapter 55"	25 May 2018	0.99
The prophecy is fulfilled and one of the Milagros dies with her love.
