= Spoiled Brats =

2021 French comedy film

- French poster for the film
- French: Pourris gâtés
- Directed by: Nicolas Cuche
- Written by: Nicolas Cuche; Laurent Turner
- Starring: Gérard Jugnot; Artus; Camille Lou; Louka Meliava
- Music by: Alexandre Azaria
- Production companies: Apollo Films; Borsalino Productions; TF1 Studio; TF1 Films Production; Other Angle Pictures
- Distributed by: Apollo Films
- Release date: 15 September 2021
- Running time: 95 minutes
- Country: France
- Language: French

Spoiled Brats (French: Pourris gâtés) is a French comedy film directed by Nicolas Cuche released in 2021. It is a remake of Mexican film Nosotros los Nobles by Gary Alazraki.

== Plot ==
Francis Bartek is a wealthy man who has never really fixed limits to his children. Today at their thirties, they live off him, which exasperates him. On the advice of a friend, he sets up a scheme to confront his two sons and his daughter to the working field and the hardness of life. Which was bad will become an enriched experience, full of twists and turns.

== Summary ==
Francis Bartek, a widower man of Polish descent, who has made fortune in the building field in Monaco starting from nothing, has two sons, Philippe and Alexandre, and a daughter Stella. The three children, already grown adults, all have defaults. Alexandre has constantly been rejected from all the establishments he attended since high school, and entertains intimate relationships with the wife and the two daughters of the director, friend of his father, from the higher school where he vegetates. Philippe concocts crazy project on crazy project, and goes to evening parties instead of giving to his father the least service of professional order. Finally, Stella is a haughty, brainless, capricious and spendthrift pest, who wants to get married with a handsome idle Argentinian, Juan Carlos, what his father rejects. He has a heart attack at the birthday reception of the 24 years old of her daughter, when he realizes that his children are worthless and incapable of working.

On overnight, the accounts of the family are blocked by justice for misuse of corporate assets and embezzlement, and the police arrives at their home to seize their goods. The father escapes and takes his children to Marseille, in the very modest country house of his childhood, while waiting to prove his innocence. Frightened for having fallen so down, without any money and food, they all have to look for work. Stella becomes a waitress in a restaurant, where she understands the humiliations that she inflicted to the people who worked for her and when she is victim of it herself as an employee. After difficult beginnings, Philippe becomes a taxi-bike driver, becomes friend with one of his taxi co-workers, and starts with him a business in vintage sport shoes. Meanwhile, Alexandre helps his father to re-paint and restore the house.

Stella's fiancé discovers the staging invented by Francis to experience his "rotten spoiled" children and force them to confront themselves to the working field. He blackmails Francis to get married urgently with Stella and to get his hand on the family loot. On the wedding day, Stella learns that Juan Carlos is in reality called Kévin Lepoutre, who admits that his family was threatened with death and chose to come to France and change identity. Francis and his two sons arrive on time to cancel the wedding, then admits that he make them think they were ruined so they can learn to work and be independent. Furious, the three children leave the city hall room and Kévin loses his accent, confirming that having lost Stella, she and her brothers will turn their back on their father, who is devastated facing the reaction of his children.

Nine months later, still in depression, Francis receives a letter of his children which turns out to be a check, then Marguerite encourages him to reconnect with them. Ferrucio escorts him to his childhood house where he finds again his children, wishes a happy birthday to Stella giving her a bouquet of flowers, and admits regretting his act on his children. While he is about to go back home, Stella catches him back to forgive him, Ferrucio and Francis decide to go back in the house and finally reconcile with Stella, Philippe and Alexandre, with presence of Marguerite and Malek. At the end, Kévin calls other people imitating different accents.

== Cast ==
- Gérard Jugnot as Francis Bartek
- Artus as Philippe Bartek
- Camille Lou as Stella Bartek
- Louka Meliava as Alexandre Bartek
- Tom Leeb as Juan Carlos / Kévin Lepoutre
- François Morel as Ferrucio
- Colette Kraffe : Marguerite
- Joffrey Verbruggen as Matthias
- Anne Le Forestier as the job agency director
- Franck Adrien as Guillaume, the cheated husband
- Jean-Baptiste Sagory as a friend of Philippe
- Ichem Bougheraba as Malek
- Jean-François Malet as the unsatisfied customer
- Stéphane Bern as the voix-over at the beginning of the film

== Production ==
=== Genesis and development ===
The film is an inspiration of Mexican film Nosotros los Nobles released in 2013, which is also a revisit of the 1949 Mexican film The Great Madcap.

=== Filming ===
The film was partly shot in the Principality of Monaco, in the documentary of the prologue. This part of the filming was complex, because of the filming admissions that were limited and constraining, which required the demand of several shots. However, the essential of the film was shot in France in Marseille.

== Box-office ==
For the first day of broadcast in the French halls, Pourris Gâtés reunited 25,246 viewers, including 12,045 in preview. The film was on third position on the box-office of the novelties behind French film Dear Mother, which scored 27,751 viewers.

During its two first weeks of broadcast, the film passed from fifth to sixth place and scored 250,666 entries in the halls. The two following weeks, the film remains at sixth place and reached 395,431 entries. After nine weeks of broadcast in France, the film scored in total 442,901 entries.

== Broadcast and success ==
=== Television broadcast ===
The film was broadcast on television for the first time on 3 August 2022 on Canal+. Its first broadcast on the free television channel TF1 on 30 July 2023 gathered 5,62 million viewers, a success of audience that allows TF1 to obtain the first place of the best audience of a film broadcast on television in 2023.

=== International exploitation ===
The film, with a modest score in France, received a higher recognition at the international. After its cinema exploitation, the rights of the film were re-bought by Netflix for a broadcast in foreign countries in November 2021, under the title Spoiled Brats. Since then, the film was watched after one week by more than 10 million viewers on the platform, and thus, only for its first weekend of exploitation, and posed itself leader of non-English speaking films for its first week. According to Gérard Jugnot, the film was really successful "in Honduras, Ecuador, Brazil and Mexico".
