= Adrián Ladrón =

Mexican actor

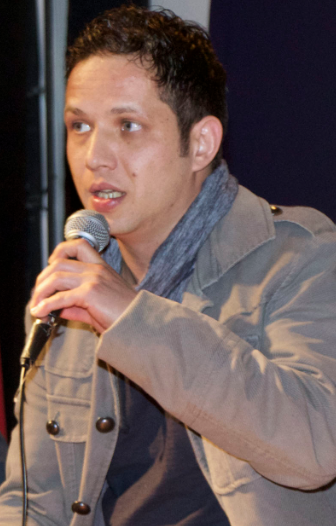
- Ladrón in a conference about the film The 4th Company
- Occupations: Actor; producer
- Years active: 2009–present

Adrián Ladrón is a Mexican actor best known for his performances in films as The 4th Company, Oveja Negra, Güeros, and After Dark. Ladrón is an actor graduated from the National School of Theater Arts of Instituto Nacional de Bellas Artes y Literatura. He won the Ariel Award for best actor in 2017.

== Filmography ==
=== Film roles ===
Year	Title	Role	Notes
2009	Oveja Negra	Memo	
2012	Caminando las noches	Julián	Short film
2014	Güeros	Moco	
2016	The 4th Company	Zambrano	
2018	After Dark	Angel	Short film; also executive producer
2018	Golden Malibu	Angel	Short film
2018	Eight Out of Ten	The Boss	

=== Television roles ===
Year	Title	Role	Notes
2018–2019	Diablo Guardián	Pig	Main role (season 1–2); 18 episodes
2018	Falco	Romano	Episode: "Efectos Secundarios"
2019	No te puedes esconder	Hugo	
2019	La negociadora	TBA	
2019	Historia de un crimen: La búsqueda	Subprocurador	
