= La negociadora =

Mexican thriller drama web television series

- Genre: Thriller
- Created by: Raúl Prieto; Rosa Clemente
- Directed by: Juan José Cardona; David Ruiz
- Starring: Bárbara Mori
- Country of origin: Mexico
- Original language: Spanish
- No. of seasons: 1
- No. of episodes: 12

Production
- Executive producer: Manolo Cardona
- Production company: 11:11 Films

Original release
- Network: Claro Video
- Release: 11 February 2021

La negociadora is a Mexican thriller drama web television series produced by 11:11 Films for the streaming services Claro Video. Manolo Cardona serves as showrunner of the series, along with David Ruiz as director. The series is based on an original idea of Punta Fina Content and the first season consists of 12 episodes. It stars Bárbara Mori as the titular character.

== Cast ==
=== Main ===
- Bárbara Mori as Eugenia Velazco
- Diego Cadavid as Marco Torrez
- Carlos Aragón Juan Velasco
- Horacio García Rojas as Jorge Nieves
- Marcela Guirado Abril Islas
- Marco Treviño as Guillermo Sánchez
- Karina Gidi as María Hurtado
- Adrián Ladrón as Farolito
- Ximena Ayala as Flor

=== Recurring ===
- Aldo Gallardo as Carlos Dos Santos
- Jesús Benavente as Alfredo Hernández
- Irineo Álvarez as Octavio
- Ana Layevska as Mónica Sánchez
- Fiona Palomo as Waleska Acosta
- Constanza Hernández as Rosa Acosta
- Julio Echeverry as Melquíades Sagasti
- Tommy Vásquez as Magín
- Juan Carlos Remolina as Agustín Negrete
- Jorge Gallegos as Mauro Guzmán
- Giovanna Zacarías as Jeanette Cafrune
- Mariana Gajá as Milagros
- Ivana de Maria as Juliana Ríos
- Azul Guaita as Susana Vega
- Pedro González as Pepe Garrido
- Iván López as Tato
- Luis Velázquez as Dr. Xavier Cova
- Christian Tappan as Cicerón
