= You Cannot Hide =

Mexican-Spanish television series

- Created by: Marcos Santana
- Written by: José Luis Acosta; Eduardo Díez; José Camacho
- Directed by: Alejandro Banazzo
- Creative director: Carlos Bodelón
- Starring: Blanca Soto; Eduardo Noriega; Iván Sánchez; Maribel Verdú; Samantha Siqueiros; Peter Vives; Patricia Guirado; Jorge Bosch; Pere Ponce; Juan Caballero; Jordi Planas
- Country of origin: United States
- Original language: Spanish
- No. of seasons: 1
- No. of episodes: 10

Production
- Executive producers: Blanca Soto; Peter Blacker; Manuel Sanabria; Victor García; Inna Payán; Luis Salinas; Ana Paula Valdovinos; Marcos Santana
- Production locations: Plaza del Callao; Gran Vía, Madrid; Puente de Segovia, Madrid; Plaza de Oriente
- Camera setup: Multi-camera
- Production companies: Isla Audiovisual; Telemundo International Studios

Original release
- Network: Telemundo
- Release: 30 September – 11 October 2019

You Cannot Hide (Spanish: No te puedes esconder) is a Spanish-language television series produced by Isla Audiovisual for Telemundo and distributed worldwide by Netflix. The series is filmed in Spain and consists of 10 episodes. It stars Blanca Soto and Eduardo Noriega It premiered on 30 September 2019 and ended on 11 October 2019.

The series became available for streaming on 24 January 2020 on Netflix.

== Cast ==
=== Main ===
- Blanca Soto as Mónica
- Eduardo Noriega as Daniel
- Iván Sánchez as Álex
- Maribel Verdú as Inspectora Urrutia
- Samantha Siqueiros as Natalia
- Peter Vives as Alberto Torres
- Patricia Guirado as Eli
- Jorge Bosch as Velasco
- Pere Ponce as El Comisario
- Juan Caballero as Humberto
- Jordi Planas as Gabriel

=== Recurring ===
- Plutarco Haza as Sánchez
- Adrián Ladrón as Hugo
- Gabriel Porras as De la Cruz
- Julio Casados as Andrés
- Giuseppe Gamba as Diego
- Bárbara Goenaga as Ana
- Eduardo Trucco as Pete
- Oleg Kricunova as Dmitri

== Production ==
The series was announced in May 2019 during the Telemundo Upfront for the 2019-2020 television season. The filming of the series lasted 12 weeks, with 58 working days. The production had a budget in the Madrid region of 5 million euros and the hiring of 75 people in the artistic team, 103 technicians and several service companies in the city. Among the locations in Madrid city are Plaza de Callao, Gran Vía, Plaza de Santo Domingo, Plaza de Oriente and Puente de Segovia. The series is produced by Isla Audiovisual for Telemundo and Netflix. It is directed by Alejandro Banazzo, Álex de Pablo at the head of the photograph, and Carlos Bodelón as creative director.

== Ratings ==
Viewership and ratings per season of You Cannot Hide
Season	Timeslot (ET)	Episodes	First aired		Last aired		Avg. viewers (millions)
Season	Timeslot (ET)	Episodes	Date	Viewers (millions)	Date	Viewers (millions)	Avg. viewers (millions)
1	Mon–Fri 10:00 p.m.	10	30 September 2019	0.89	11 October 2019	0.82	0.82

== Episodes ==
No.	Title	English title	Directed by	Original release date	US viewers (millions)
1	"La fuga"	"On The Run"	Alejandro Bazzano	30 September 2019	0.89
A terrorist attack in Spain surprises Daniel, a hitman who has been hired to kill Mónica, a Mexican woman who years ago fled her country with her daughter, leaving behind her dark past.
2	"La pista"	"The Hint"	Alejandro Bazzano	1 October 2019	0.79
Daniel discovers that Mónica saved his life, but still continues with his purpose of killing her. Natalia calls her mother and uses an unusual phrase, as a clue to make Mónica understand that she is in danger.
3	"El tatuaje"	"The Tattoo"	Alejandro Bazzano	2 October 2019	0.69
Mónica refuses to accept Daniel's help, but not finding enough support in the authorities or in Álex, Daniel becomes increasingly essential for her.
4	"Evidencias del crimen"	"Proof Of The Crime"	Alejandro Bazzano	3 October 2019	0.80
Photographs of the body of Prats are leaked to the press. Mónica puts her life in danger by going after her daughter's kidnappers. Álex begins to suspect Daniel's intentions.
5	"En peligro"	"In Danger"	Alejandro Bazzano	4 October 2019	0.79
Mónica ends up badly injured in the hands of the Russians. The key clue to Natalia's whereabouts is farther away. Natalia reaches her final destination.
6	"La verdad"	"The Truth"	Alejandro Bazzano	7 October 2019	0.87
Daniel is forced to confess the truth to Mónica. Eli receives threats from Torres and the police find out that she is a politician's lover.
7	"Un nuevo sospechoso"	"A New Suspect"	Alejandro Bazzano	8 October 2019	0.84
A mysterious yellow envelope, with information about a murder 20 years ago in Mexico, arrives at the hands of Urrutia. A new suspect of Beatriz Prats' crime appears.
8	"Destino final"	"Final Destination"	Alejandro Bazzano	9 October 2019	0.82
Mónica confirms that Natalia's final destination was Mexico. Daniel remembers the reason that led him to accept killing Mónica. Natalia escapes with help from Hugo.
9	"Intuición"	"Intuition"	Alejandro Bazzano	10 October 2019	0.81
Natalia finds out who ordered her kidnapping. Mónica, already in Mexico, seeks help from the DEA. Alex writes a farewell letter to Eli and starts his plan. Velasco is convinced that Urrutia knows more than it seems.
10	"Cara a cara"	"Face to Face"	Alejandro Bazzano	11 October 2019	0.82
Monica is face to face with her ex-husband. Álex is forced to become an eternal fugitive.

== Awards and nominations ==
Year	Award	Category	Nominated	Result	Ref
2020	International Emmy Awards	Best Non-English Language U.S. Primetime Program	No te puedes esconder	Nominated	
2020	Produ Awards	Best Opening Credits	No te puedes esconder	Nominated	
2020	Produ Awards	Best Director	Alejandro Bazzano, Manuel Sanabria, Alfonso Arandia and Carlos Carrera	Nominated	
2020	Produ Awards	Best Producer	Ana Paula Valdovinos and Marcos Santana	Won	
2020	Produ Awards	Best Cinematographer	Alex de Pablo and Sara Gallego	Nominated	
2020	Produ Awards	Best Lead Actress	Blanca Soto	Nominated	
2020	Produ Awards	Best Lead Actor	Eduardo Noriega	Nominated	
