= Rock FM (Spanish radio station) =

Spain
- Broadcast area: Spain

Programming
- Format: Rock music

Ownership
- Owner: Radio Popular S.A.

History
- First air date: October 4, 2004

Links
- Webcast: streaming WMP
- Website: rockfm.fm

Rock FM is a Spanish radio station. Previously known as Rock & Gol, it is owned by Radio Popular S.A. (Cadena COPE).

== Background ==
Rock & Gol programs were centered on rock music of all times and soccer. It was well known among young people for its two lead hosts Iván Guillén and Rafa Escalada and for beaming the best music of all times. It later switched to on pr-programmed music. In 2011 the radio station was renamed to Rock FM.

As of 2015, El Pirata y su banda (The Pirate and His Band) on Rock FM was one of the top five morning shows on Spanish radio, according to the General Media Survey.

== Programs and air staff ==
- Iván Guillén 'El Youngie': No longer on air.
- El Oldie y el youngie: No longer on air.
- Rafael Escalada, 'El Oldie': Monday to Friday (11 am to 3 pm).
- Iván Guillén 'El Youngie': No longer on air.
- Rock & Gol Deportes: (Monday to Friday (8 pm to 8.30 pm))

Sports news with Omar Candelas.

- Little Steven's Underground Garage: (Fridays from 10 pm to 12 am)

Program host by Steven Van Zandt guitarist of the Bruce Springsteen's E-Street Band.
