= Yo, Potro =

2018 film by Marcos Bucay

- Genre: Mockumentary
- Created by: Marcos Bucay
- Written by: Marcos Bucay
- Directed by: Marcos Bucay
- Starring: Joaquín Ferreira; Marcela Álvarez; Benjamín Alfonso
- Country of origin: Mexico
- Original language: Spanish

Production
- Running time: 60 minutes
- Production company: Alazraki Entertainment

Original release
- Network: Netflix
- Release: 19 October 2018

Related
- Club de Cuervos

Yo, Potro (stylized on screen as Club de Cuervos presenta: Yo, Potro, also known as I, Potro) is a Mexican television special that premiered on October 19, 2018. It is set in a fake documentary format directed and written by Marcos Bucay for Netflix. It is a spin-off of the Mexican web series Club de Cuervos, and in turn is a special episode of the franchise. It stars Joaquín Ferreira as the titular character.

== Plot ==
The special revolves around Diego Armando Romani aka El Potro, a young Argentine who tries to record a documentary about his life. But suddenly he is notified that he has been fired from his current job, so he decides to go to his native Argentina; where he believes he will be received as a King. Already in his Argentina, he arrives at his brother's wedding where he realizes that he is not well received by him, and his friends, and from there, unexpected situations begin to happen and his life of excess is not well seen by all. Since his arrival, he has been told that he should not drink, get high, or go near his brother's family.
