= Crime Diaries: The Search =

2020 Mexican television series

- Spanish: Historia de un crimen: La búsqueda
- Genre: Drama
- Starring: Regina Blandón; Darío Yazbek Bernal; Verónica Bravo
- Country of origin: Mexico
- Original language: Spanish
- No. of seasons: 1
- No. of episodes: 6

Production
- Production company: Dynamo

Original release
- Network: Netflix
- Release: 12 June 2020

Related
- Crime Diaries: Night Out

Crime Diaries: The Search (Spanish for Historia de un crimen: La búsqueda) is a Mexican television series produced by Dynamo for Netflix. It stars Regina Blandón, Darío Yazbek Bernal and Verónica Bravo, and the story is based on the case of the disappearance and death of 4-year-old girl Paulette Gebara Farah. All 6 episodes of the season became available for streaming on Netflix on 12 June 2020. The series received criticism for its light comedy tone, the poor performance of Yazbek and for omitting all mentions regarding both Paulette's parents' roles in the events.

== Cast ==
- Regina Blandón as Carolina Tello (character based on Lilly Téllez)
- Darío Yazbek Bernal as Alberto Bazbaz
- Verónica Bravo as Lizette Farah
- Adriana Llabrés as Arlette Farah
- Diana Bovio as Amanda de la Rosa
- Daniel Haddad as Mauricio Gebara
- Adrián Ladrón as Alfredo Castillo
- Ernesto Laguardia as Gilberto Torres (character based on Javier Alatorre)
- Alejandro Calva as Miguel

== Episodes ==
No.	Title	Directed by	Written by	Original release date
1	"It was Harry Potter"	Santiago Limón	Santiago Limón y Silvia Jiménez	12 June 2020
2	"I Gotta Feeling"	Santiago Limón	Fabián Archondo	12 June 2020
3	"Climax"	Catalina Aguilar Mastretta	Silvia Jiménez	12 June 2020
4	"The Show Must Go On"	Catalina Aguilar Mastretta	Fabián Archondo	12 June 2020
5	"Lights, Bed, Action"	Katina Medina Mora	Silvia Jiménez	12 June 2020
6	"The Burial"	Katina Medina Mora	Fabián Archondo	12 June 2020
