= Cadena COPE =

Spain's national radio station

Spain
- Branding: Cadena COPE

Programming
- Language: Spanish
- Format: Full-service and religious

Ownership
- Owner: Radio Popular S.A.
- Sister stations: Cadena 100; Rock & Gol; Megastar FM

History
- First air date: 1 January 1979; 47 years ago

Links
- Website: www.cope.es

COPE, an acronym for Cadena de Ondas Populares Españolas ("People's Radiowaves of Spain Network") formerly called Radio Popular or simply known as Cope, is a Spanish language radio station. It is the second most listened to in Spain's generalist radio. Owned by the Spanish Episcopal Conference (Spanish Catholic Bishops' Conference) company "Radio Popular SA", it belongs to the "Group COPE" with music stations Cadena 100, Rock FM and Megastar FM, in addition to Spain's generalist TV channel Trece. The station is associated with newspaper ABC, along with other radio stations which belong to Ábside Media, the media group owned by the Spanish Episcopal Conference. It is available on FM, AM, DAB and as a radio station on TV, as well as via apps and streaming on its website.

Created with the aim of offering religious services, since the 1980s its programming has evolved into the model of conventional general radio, while maintaining programmes with religious content, such as José Luís Restán's El Espejo and Irene Pozo's La linterna de la Iglesia. It also broadcasts Sunday services and special dates marked on the liturgical calendar such as Christmas and Easter, Holy Mass and Iglesia noticia (Church message) are broadcast. Its editorial guideline is the promotion of the views of the hierarchy of the Spanish Catholic Church.

== See also ==
- Radio Maria
