= Pepe Martínez =

Pepe Martínez may refer to:

- Pepe Martínez (actor) (1905–1955), Mexican actor
- Pepe Martínez (guitarist) (1922–1984), Spanish flamenco guitarist
- Pepe Martínez (footballer) (1953–1981), Mexican footballer

== See also ==
- José Martínez (disambiguation)
