= Tell Me When (film) =

- Film poster
- Spanish: Dime Cuándo Tú
- Directed by: Gerardo Gatica González
- Written by: Gerardo Gatica González
- Starring: Héctor Bonilla; Ofelia Reyes Botello; Brett Calo
- Production company: Panorama Global
- Release date: 21 April 2021
- Running time: 95 minutes
- Country: Mexico
- Language: Spanish

Tell Me When (Spanish: Dime Cuándo Tú) is a 2021 Mexican romantic comedy film directed and written by Gerardo Gatica González in his directorial debut. Starring Héctor Bonilla, Ofelia Reyes Botello and Brett Calo.

== Cast ==
- Héctor Bonilla as Juancho
- Ofelia Reyes Botello
- Brett Calo as Will (voice)
- Manolo Caro
- Verónica Castro as Ines
- Lee Cohen as Beto (voice)
- Gilli Messer as Dani (voice)
- Gabriel Nuncio as Beto
- Ludwika Paleta
- Michael C. Pizzuto as Ramiro (voice)
- Ximena Romo as Dani
- Matthew David Rudd as Javier
- José Carlos Ruiz as Pepe
- José Salof
- Juca Viapri as Gabriel
- Jesús Zavala as Will
