= Todo mal =

- Promotional poster
- Directed by: Issa López
- Written by: Issa López; Ari Rosen
- Starring: Osvaldo Benavides; Marcela Guirado; Martin Altomaro; Alfonso Dosal; Sebastián Zurita; Harrison Jones
- Music by: Andrew Kawczynski
- Production companies: Emma Producciones; Traziende Films
- Release date: 16 March 2018 (Mexico)
- Country: Mexico
- Language: Spanish

Todo mal is a Mexican film written and directed by Issa López, and starring Osvaldo Benavides, Marcela Guirado, Martin Altomaro, Alfonso Dosal, and Sebastián Zurita. The film premiered on March 16, 2018, in Mexico.

== Plot ==
The film follows Fernando (Osvaldo Benavides), a young diplomat who has just achieved the most important achievement of his career: returning Montezuma's plume to Mexico. Fernando is also about to marry the love of his life. On the other hand, his two cousins, Matías (Alfonso Dosal) — a former pop star — and Dante (Martin Altomaro), a man trying to finish an infinite thesis that lives in the closet of his mother's house, are the complete opposite of our protagonist. Everything changes when Viviana (Marcela Guirado), Fernando's girlfriend, confesses through WhatsApp that she has cheated on him, a message that arrives at the least opportune moment. Fernando loses the control he has maintained all his life, stealing the plume and throwing himself in an insane mission for revenge, which could cost him his life, his poor cousins, and the chance to bring back the plume of Montezuma to a country that has been waiting 500 years for its return.

== Cast ==
- Osvaldo Benavides as Fernando
- Marcela Guirado as Viviana
- Martin Altomaro as Dante
- Alfonso Dosal as Matías
- Sebastián Zurita as Masiosare
- Marianna Burelli as Duva
- Paula Serrano as Carmen
- Harrison Jones as Austrian Diplomat
