= José Mari Martínez =

José Mari Martínez may refer to:

- José Mari Martínez (Filipino footballer), Filipino football forward turned sports executive
- José Mari Martínez (Spanish footballer) (born 1942), Spanish footballer defender

== See also ==
- Jose Martinez (disambiguation)
- José María Martínez (disambiguation)
