= Luis Gerardo Méndez =

Mexican actor and producer (born 1982)

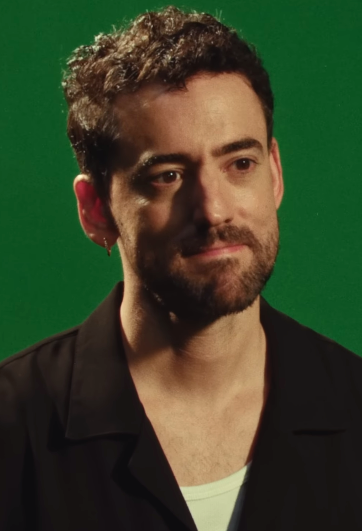
- Méndez in 2024
- Born: 12 March 1982 (age 44); Aguascalientes, Aguascalientes, Mexico
- Occupations: Actor, film producer
- Years active: 2003–present

Luis Gerardo Hernández Méndez (born 12 March 1982) is a Mexican actor and film producer.

== Life and career ==
Luis Gerardo Hernández Méndez was born in Aguascalientes, Aguascalientes, on 12 March 1982. Méndez shot to fame with his starring role in the 2013 comedy film The Noble Family, which for a few months was Mexico's highest-ever grossing film. The following year, he played a role in the movie Cantinflas, and as of 2015, he co-produced (with friend Gary Alazraki).

He co-starred (with Mariana Treviño) in Club de Cuervos, which is Netflix's first-ever original production in Spanish. More recently, his production company Cine Vaquero had a first look deal with ViacomCBS International Studios. He appeared as Baltasar Frías in the Peacock black comedy mystery series The Resort (2022).

== Personal life ==
He is openly gay. As of January 2016, he was in a relationship with Pablo Chemor.

Méndez has a dog named Tuba, and they both appeared in a PETA campaign encouraging people to treat their pets as family members.

== Awards and nominations ==
For his role as Javi Noble in The Noble Family (2013), Méndez was nominated for the Ariel Award for Best Actor. He won a New York Latin ACE Awards for Best Supporting Actor in a Motion Picture for his role in Cantinflas (2014). In 2019, Méndez received a second Ariel Award nomination for Best Actor for his lead role in Bayoneta.

== Filmography ==
=== Film ===
Year	Title	Role	Notes
2004	Santos peregrinos	Mao	
2005	Manos libres	Marcelo	
2006	Efectos secundarios	Young Ignacio	
2006	La niña en la piedra	Joaquín	
2006	Tierra de gringos	Fresa	Short film
2008	Más allá de mí	Rufino	
2009	Sincronía	Arturo	
2010	3 Shots	Jaime	Short film
2010	180°	Beto	
2010	Hidalgo: La historia jamás contada	Rodríguez	
2010	Sucedió en un día	Guía novato	Segment: "Siete"
2011	Bacalar	Luis	
2011	La otra familia	George	
2011	Viento en contra	Andrés	
2012	Morelos	José María Liceaga	
2013	No sé si cortarme las venas o dejármelas largas	Lucas	
2013	Nosotros los Nobles	Javi Noble	
2013	Paradise		
2013	Shakespeare tuvo una hermana	Marcos	Short film
2014	Cantinflas	Estanislao Shilinsky Bachanska	
2014	Elvira, te daría mi vida pero la estoy usando	Ricardo	
2015	Home	Oh	Voice role; Spanish dubbing
2016	Rebirth	Doctor	
2016	Storks	Junior	Voice role; Spanish dubbing
2016	Sundown	Tourist Cop	
2017	Camino a Marte	Mark	
2018	Tiempo Compartido	Pedro	
2019	Charlie's Angels	The Saint	
2019	Murder Mystery	Juan Carlos Rivera	
2020	Half Brothers	Renato	Also executive producer
2022	Me Time	Armando	
2024	Skincare	Angel Vergara	
2024	Technoboys	Alan	Also director (directorial debut)
2025	A Time for Bravery	Mariano Silverstein	In Spanish: La hora de los valientes
2026	Animals	Ramon	

=== Television ===
Year	Title	Role	Notes
2003	Ladrón de corazones	Raúl	Television debut
2004	Gitanas	Claudio	
2005	Corazón partido	Ignacio "Nacho" Echarri	
2007	Lola, érase una vez	Bataca	
2008	Vecinos	Piloto	Recurring role; 6 episodes
2009	Mujeres asesinas	Luis	Episode: "Cecilia, prohibida"
2009–2012	XY	Julián	Main role
2009	Tiempo final	Cesar Rojas	Episode: "El funeral"
2009	Los simuladores	Unknown role	Recurring role; 4 episodes
2010	Gritos de muerte y libertad	Juan Fernando Domínguez	2 episodes
2010	Capadocia	Luis	2 episodes
2011	El encanto del águila	José León Toral	Episode: "El último Caudillo"
2012	La clínica	Miguel	Recurring role
2015–2019	Club de Cuervos	Salvador "Chava" Iglesias, Jr.	Main role / Executive Producer
2016	Drunk History	Hernán Cortés	Episode: "Cortés y la Malinche, El presidente y los Espíritus, La pierna de Santa Anna"
2021	Narcos: Mexico	Victor Tapia	Main role (season 3)
2021–2022	The Envoys	Pedro Salinas	Main role
2022	The Resort	Baltasar Frías	Main role
2022	Belascoarán	Héctor Belascoarán Shayne	Main role
2024	¿Quién lo mató?	Mario Bezares	Main role
2025	Mentiras, la serie	Emmanuel	Main role / Executive producer
