= Bankrolled =

2021 film

- Netflix release poster
- Spanish: Fondeados
- Directed by: Marcos Bucay
- Written by: Marcos Bucay
- Starring: Aldo Escalante; Ricardo Polanco; Natalia Téllez
- Production companies: Fosforescente; Happy Shop
- Distributed by: Netflix
- Release date: 23 July 2021
- Running time: 97 minutes
- Country: Mexico
- Language: Spanish

Bankrolled (Spanish: Fondeados) is a 2021 Mexican comedy film directed and written by Marcos Bucay and starring Aldo Escalante, Ricardo Polanco and Natalia Téllez.

== Cast ==
- Aldo Escalante as Polo Ríos
- Ricardo Polanco as Blas Solano
- Natalia Téllez as Natalia
- Fabrizio Santini as Aderales
- Seo Ju Park as Mayte
- María Chacón as Sandra
- Giuseppe Gamba as Cano
- Sebastián Zurita as Gus
- Benshorts
- María José Bernal
- Johana Fragoso Blendl
- Germán Bracco

== Release ==
Bankrolled was released globally through Netflix on July 23, 2021.
