= Martínez de Alfara =

Spanish light-heavyweight boxer

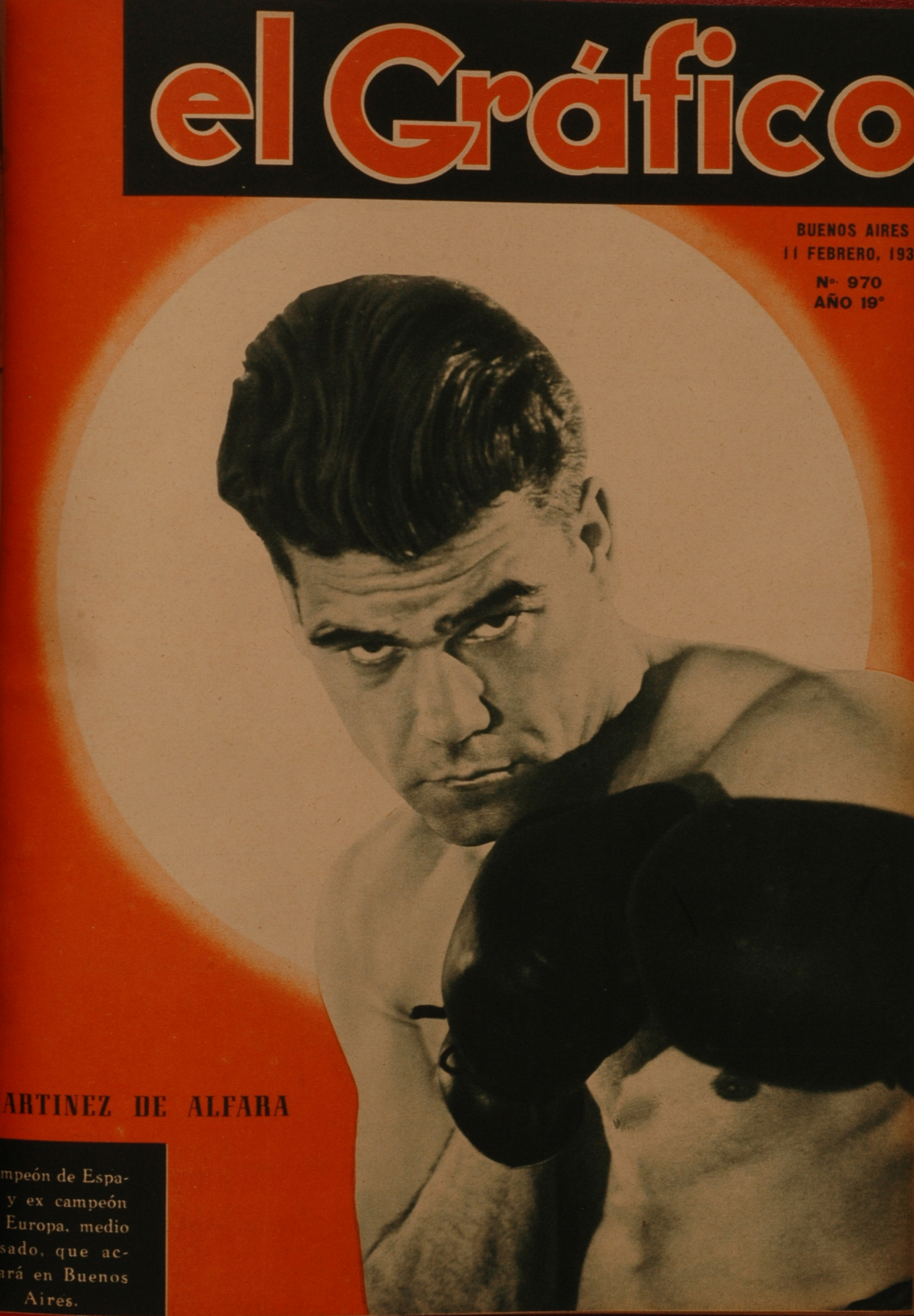

Personal information
- Nicknames: Martínez de Alfara, Tigre de Alfara
- Born: José Martínez Valero; October 14, 1911 Valencia
- Died: October 14, 1963 (aged 32) Mar del Plata, Provincia de Buenos Aires
- Weight: Welterweight, Light Heavyweight

Sport
- Country: Spain
- Sport: Boxing
- Coached by: Tomás Beltrán, Nicolás Calvo, Carbonell, Pedro Sáez Benedicto, Serafín Martínez Fort, Eduardo Castellanos, Marcel Dorval

José Martínez Valero (October 14, 1911 - October 14, 1963) was a Spanish professional boxer, who won the first European light heavyweight title for Spain on February 7, 1934. He was known by the nicknames Martínez de Alfara or Tigre de Alfara.

== Biography ==
Martínez de Alfara was born in Valencia, Spain, on October 14, 1911. Soon after his mother died, he moved to Alfara del Patriarca at a very young age, as he got adopted by a close neighbor and friend who lived in that city. Trained by Tomás Beltrán from Alfara, he debuted as an amateur boxer in 1927, fighting 19 victorious fights. After winning the amateur title "Cinturón Valencia" in 1928, with manager Nicolás Calvo Martínez, he signed a professional contract, beginning to train in the gym at the Valencian fronton "Jai Alai". With a good defense and a powerful punch, he gained weight and fights, winning the regional championship of Levante in 1929 in the light heavyweight division.

That same year, after 18 consecutive victories in Valencia, he was named contender for the national title after beating the Cantabrian Amador Rodríguez, on a program organized by the Valencian Press Association, on October 12, 1929. In March 1930, the "Tigre de Alfara" (nickname created by "Alarcón", promoter and boxing columnist for El Mercantil Valenciano news paper), won the Spanish light heavyweight championship against Basque boxer Antonio Gaviola. He was national champion at that weight from 1930 to 1937.

In 1930, Martínez de Alfara was already ranked among the best national boxers in hos division, so after nine victories and one draw (tie), he obtained the rights to compete for the European title. In 1931, the International Boxing Union (not to be confused with the modern, world title fights sanctioning International Boxing Federation) named him a candidate for the European light heavyweight championship, along with the IBU champion Ernst Pistulla of Germany. In Valencia it was quite an event, since a European title had never been contested there. Despite the great atmosphere, he lost the fight on points, in a very competitive match. In 1932, after 9 wins and 3 losses, he once again competed in Valencia for the European title against another German, Adolf Heuser, and lost again,this time by first-round knockout, receiving boos from his fans afterwards. After this defeat for the European title, the relationship that the boxer had with Calvo and Alarcón was broken. It was another manager, Juan Tomás, better known then as "Tomaset", who recovered the young athlete for boxing, taking him to train in gyms in Madrid and Barcelona, cities where he recovered his lost prestige.

=== IBU championship ===
From the beginning of 1933, he returned to training in the city on the Turia River. On April 22, 1933, again in the Valencia bullring, he won the national light heavyweight title against Santiago Morales from Almeria. When he appeared in the ring he would receive amother round of boos from his fans, he impressed his fans this time and returned to the winning column. In 1933, with a total of 6 victories achieved, he was again named contender for the European title by the International Boxing Union. This time, the rival was the Belgian champion Leonard Steyaert, as the Swede John Andersson vacated the light heavyweight title. The fight took place on February 7, 1934, at the Olympia Theater-Circus in Barcelona, where he won the professional European championship for the first time for Spain.

But the European title did not last long, from Paris, the famous American promoter Jeff Dickson offered the Valencian 100,000 francs to fight against the world middleweight champion, the Frenchman Marcel Thil, who did not pit his title on the line in this match. On March 26 of that year, with the Parisian Palais des Sports full, the Spaniard defended his European light heavyweight title against the Frenchman, being disqualified in the thirteenth round by the Italian referee "Sermonetta". At the end of the fight, the Valencian had a broken hand. The French public booed the referee because they did not agree with his decision. A rematch between the two boxers was never held.

In 1935 he won 5 fights and had a no-contest fight with Ignacio Ara. During 1936, and until the start of the Spanish Civil War, he fought 3 battles (2 victories, 1 defeat). With his wife Elvira and his son Pepito, he lived in Alfara since the beginning of the war. A supporter of the government of the Second Spanish Republic, he participated in charity shows. Beginning in 1937 he went on a forced tour to France due to clashes with some militiamen from the municipality.

=== Later career ===
Accompanied to Paris, France by Juan Tomás, who later returned to Valencia, he changed managers during 1937, going on to train with the Cuban musician and boxing manager Eduardo Castellanos, in the "Salle Mario" gym. A gym that was on Boulevard Barbès, near the Paris North Station. In France, he faced prominent European boxers, demonstrating that he had not lost physical shape despite the war. In January 1938 he went to Argentina without his family. The boxer was reunited with his family after the war, in 1941. In South America, he fought in Argentina, Chile and Brazil. With nearly 150 fights contested, he retired as a boxer in the "Libertad" club in Sunchales (Santa Fe). In 1942 he settled with his family in Mar del Plata, on the tree-lined "Pampa" street. After his retirement, he became a coach and manager of young athletes at the Aldosivi Athletic Club and in the "Bristol" Stadium gym. Some of his pupils were Olympians, notably: Ubaldo F. Sacco (not to be confused with his son, "Ubi" Sacco), Antonio Cuevas, Tito Yanni, Rafael Merentino, Julio Roberto Palavecinp, Jusn Carreno, Oscar Lucero ("Gatiquita"), Ángel Coria, Néstor Saravia and Mario Tarsetti.

=== Boxing record ===
Martínez de Alfara had 107 professional boxing contests, of which he won 76, lost 22 and tied 9, with 26 wins and 3 defeats by knockout or technical knockouts.

== Death ==
He died at Mar del Plata, Argentina, on October 14, 1963.

== See also ==
- List of Spaniards
