= José Antonio Martínez Bayó =

Spanish athlete (1952–2020)

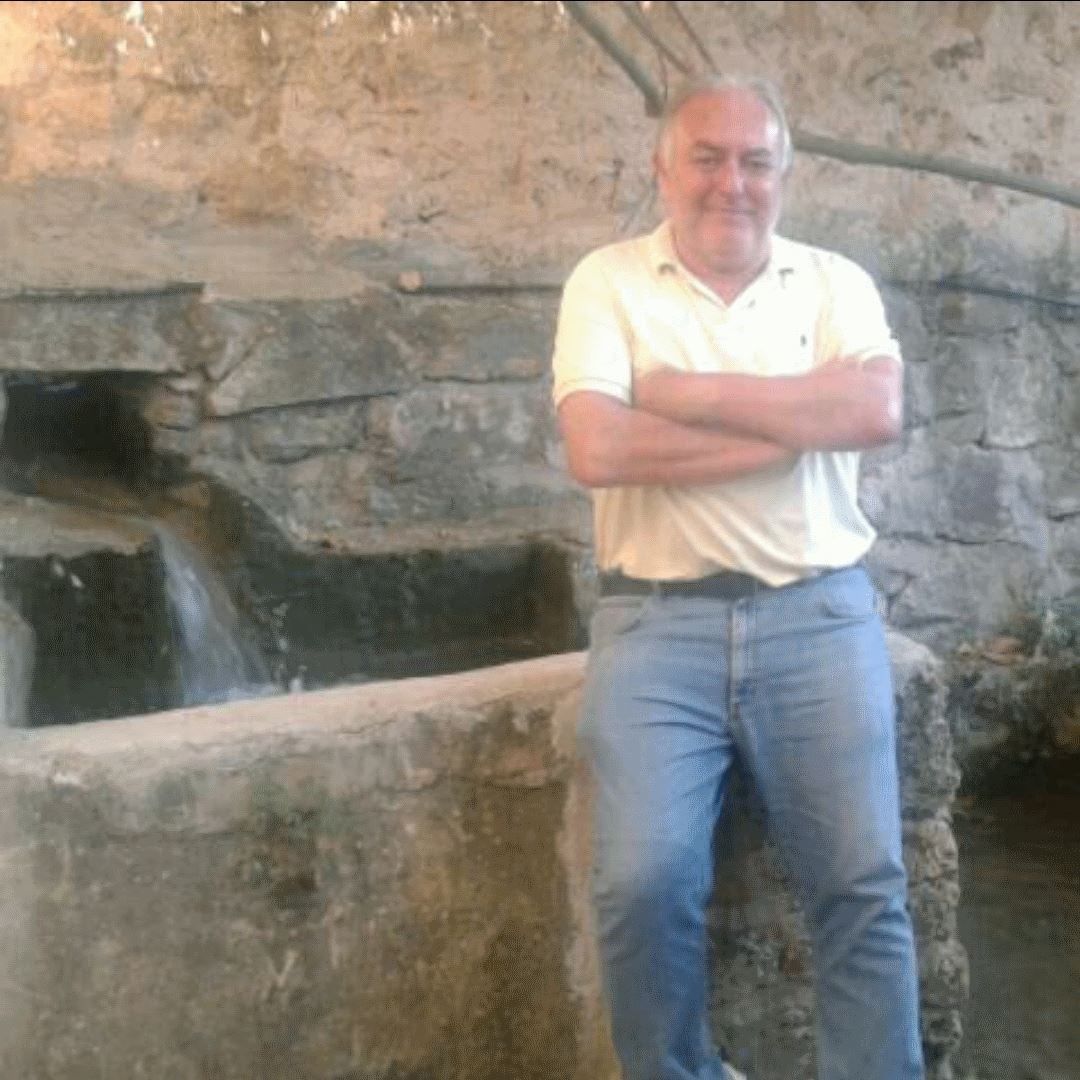

José Antonio Martínez Bayo (Lleida, 1 June 1952 – 30 March 2020) was a Spanish athlete, and a champion of indoor running.

== Career ==
Martínez began his athletic career with the RCD Espanyol, but was part of CN Barcelona during most of it. He broke the Catalan records of 1,500 m (1975) and 3,000 m (1974). He was part of the Spanish team in international competitions in four instances. He was considered one of the best Spanish middle-distance runners of the 1970s.

He was Spanish champion of 1500 meters in indoor running during the years 1974 and 1975. He was considered one of the best long-distance athletes of the seventies and in international competitions he had best year in 1975. In that year he had a notable participation in the indoor Europeans in Katowice, Poland.

He was seventh in his series, at the continental level, with a time of 4: 00.4.

== Honors ==
- 5 Catalan Championships of 1500 meters: 1970, 1973, 1974, 1976, 1978
- 1 Catalan Indoor Championship of 1,500 meters: 1977
- 4 Catalan Indoor Championships of 3000 meters: 1970, 1972, 1973, 1974
- 2 Spanish Indoor Championships of 1,500 meters: 1974, 1975

== Catalan records ==
- 1,500 meters 3:45.3 on February 8, 1975 in Dortmund (Germany).
- 3,000 meters 8:16.6 on March 2, 1974 in Sabadell (Spain).

== Death ==
Martínez died at age 67 during the COVID-19 pandemic in Spain, due to complications caused by COVID-19. The Royal Spanish Athletics Federation (RFEA) announced his death on Twitter, highlighting his sporting achievements and extending its condolences to his family and friends.

Due to the state of alarm due to COVID-19, his funeral was not held until June 6, 2020.
