= Malaventura =

2011 film

- Directed by: Michel Lipkes
- Written by: Fernando del Razo; Michel Lipkes
- Starring: Isaac Lopez
- Cinematography: Gerardo Barroso
- Release date: October 2011
- Running time: 66 minutes
- Country: Mexico
- Language: Spanish

Malaventura is a 2011 Mexican drama film directed and co-written by Michel Lipkes.

== Cast ==
- Enrique Arias as Jugador de poker 2
- Graciela Castillo as Señora cantina.
- Payaso Clavito as Jugador de poker 3
- Urbano Cruz as Jugador de poker 4
- Francisco Jimenez as Gandalla 2
- Isaac Lopez as Viejo
- José Luis Martínez as Mientamadres 1
- Raul Montelongo as Hombre que canta en la calle
- Guadalupe Nava Nova as Gandalla 1
- El Pajarito as Dueño del bar
- Genaro Rangel as Tendero
- Alejandra Resendis as Chica en el metro
- Jesus Zavala as Damian Martínez
