= Luis Martínez (footballer, born 1999) =

Mexican footballer

Personal information
- Full name: Luis Martínez Aguilar
- Date of birth: April 3, 1999 (age 27)
- Place of birth: Chihuahua, Mexico
- Height: 1.76 m (5 ft 9 1/2 in)
- Position: Defender

Youth career
- –2018: Tijuana

Senior career*
Years	Team	Apps	(Gls)
2018–2020	Tijuana	5	(0)
2020–2022	Salamanca UDS	7	(0)
- * Club domestic league appearances and goals as of 1 August 2021

Luis Martínez Aguilar (born 3 April 1999) is a Mexican professional footballer who plays as a defender for Spanish club Salamanca UDS.

== Club career ==
On 7 October 2018, Martínez made his official debut in the Liga MX with Tijuana against Querétaro.

On 13 September 2020 he joined to Segunda División B club Salamanca.
