= Andrea Ortega-Lee =

Mexican comedian, writer, & actor

Andrea Ortega-Lee (born O'Lee) is a Mexican stand up comedian, actress and writer. She is also known as "Manchita".

After quitting her job in advertising, Andrea "Manchita", began frequenting comedy open mics in the early stages of the rising comedy scene in Mexico City.

She has appeared in Comedy Central Presents for Latin America and Stand Parados and is also a regular guest in El Incorrecto and Celebrity Rooms on E! Entertainment Latin America.

In 2013, she wrote for the SNL Mexico pilot where she met Eugenio Derbez, who recommended her for the main part of the 2015 movie Ramona y los escarabajos (a.k.a. Ella es Ramona).

The year 2017 has proven to be one of the most successful years of her career. Starring as Paquita in the telenovela Paquita la del Barrio, as Jackie in Dolores, la Jenn que yo Conocí and as El Primo in 3 Idiotas.
