= Panteón Francés de San Joaquín =

Cemetery in Mexico City

- Interactive map of Panteón Francés de San Joaquín

Details
- Established: 14 March 1942; 84 years ago
- Location: Miguel Hidalgo borough, Mexico City
- Country: Mexico
- Coordinates: 19°26′59″N 99°12′17″W
- Find a Grave: Panteón Francés de San Joaquín

The Panteón Francés de San Joaquín is a cemetery located in Mexico City. Opened in 1942, Mexican and foreign personalities are interred within it.

This cemetery was conceived after the brief closure of the Panteón Francés de la Piedad due to saturation, in 1940.
