= Gary Alazraki =

Mexican director

Gaz Alazraki
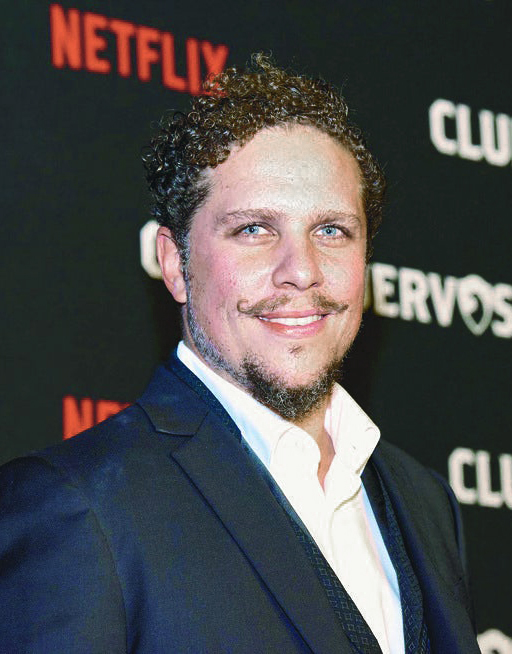
- Alazraki in September 2019
- Born: 1977 (age 48–49); Mexico City, Mexico
- Occupations: Writer, director, producer, company owner
- Years active: 2003–present
- Family: Carlos Alazraki (father)

Gary "Gaz" Alazraki is a Mexican director, screenwriter and producer known for directing the film Father of the Bride (2022); for writing and directing Mexico's record breaking comedy Nosotros los Nobles (2013); and for being the co-creator, executive producer and director of Club de Cuervos (2015), Netflix's first original series in Spanish. He heads Alazraki Entertainment and is a Board Member of Oceana.

== Background and Education ==
Gaz was born in 1977 in Mexico City. He is the son of Carlos Alazraki and Cynthia Alazraki. He studied at the American School Foundation in Mexico City and graduated in 2001 with a Bachelor in Arts in Cinema and Media Studies from the University of Southern California.

== Early career ==
Gaz acquired on-set experience at the beginning of his career by directing commercials, and the short films: Volver, volver (2005) starring Jaime Camil, Martha Higareda, Tony Dalton and La Hora Cero (2008) produced by Guillermo Arriaga.

== Nosotros los Nobles ==
In 2011 Gaz began production for Nosotros los Nobles starring Gonzalo Vega, Luis Gerardo Méndez, Karla Souza, and Juan Pablo Gil. The film was released by Warner Bros. in 2013 and it became the highest grossing Mexican Movie of all time. Rotten Tomatoes gave it a 100% rating and the film stayed in the Box-Office-Top-10 for 17 weeks -second place to Titanic (20 weeks). With 7.2 million viewers and $340 million pesos in box office sales, it doubled the record from the previous Highest Grossing Mexican Film in History.

The film’s satirical take on the 1% was profiled by The New York Times, The Wall Street Journal, and the LA Times, while the Box Office performance was headlined in Forbes, Variety and The Hollywood Reporter.

It won Best Movie at the CANACINE Awards, and garnered Luis Gerardo Méndez the nomination for Best Actor at The Mexican Academy Awards as well as a nomination for Best Screenplay.

Expansion Magazine awarded the Alazraki Brothers the "Marketers of the Year" award, while Quien Magazine placed Alazraki in the list of the "50 Most Influential Mexicans of the Year," and Forbes called him one of the "30 Most Creative Mexicans in the World."

== Club de Cuervos ==
In 2014 Gaz teamed up with Luis Gerardo Méndez again for what would become Netflix’s first International Original series.

The show based on a fictional Soccer Team called Los Cuervos de Nuevo Toledo, got an 80% score on Rotten Tomatoes. It ran for 4 seasons, and gave way to Netflix’s first spin off: The Ballad of Hugo Sánchez -Directed and executive Produced by his brother and partner Mark Alazraki.

In 2017, Netflix touted Club de Cuervos as its most binge-raced show in Mexico. The Third Season was nominated for Best International Comedy at the International Emmy Awards and won Best Comedy at the Phoenix Awards.

The show finally concluded in January 2019 with the last 3 episodes averaging a 9.5 Rating in IMDB. They sold over 100,000 pieces of Cuervos apparel with their brand partner Charly, and its official sponsor: Corona Beer, sold 10 million Club de Cuervos Beers in celebration of the team’s fake victory.

== Father of the Bride ==
In 2019 he directed Father of the Bride for Plan B and Warner Bros.

With Andy Garcia and Gloria Estefan starring as a couple in the brink of divorce, this reimagining follows a Cuban American man in Miami who wants to preserve his traditions as his elder daughter played by Adria Arjona is about to marry a Mexican Fiancé played by Diego Boneta.

Produced by Jeremy Kleiner and Dede Gardner, this version of the title got an 80% score on Rotten Tomatoes and drew HBO Max’s Biggest Audience For A Streaming-Only Film.

== Máquina Vega and La oficina ==
Alazraki heads the production company Máquina Vega. In 2024, the company entered an overall deal with Amazon MGM Studios, under which it produces La oficina, the Mexican adaptation of the BBC series The Office created by Ricky Gervais and Stephen Merchant. Alazraki directs and executive produces the series, with Marcos Bucay as showrunner. Set at a family-owned soap company in Aguascalientes, the series premiered on Prime Video on 13 March 2026 in Latin America, Brazil and Spain. In April 2026, Prime Video renewed the series for a second season.

== Filmography ==
=== Film ===
| Year | Title | Credited as | | | | Notes |
| Year | Title | Director | Writer | Producer | Actor | Notes |
|---|---|---|---|---|---|---|
| 2004 | Respete las señales | Yes | Yes | Yes | No | Short film |
| 2005 | Volver, volver | Yes | Yes | No | No | Short film |
| 2008 | La hora cero | Yes | No | No | No | Short film |
| 2008 | Casi divas | No | No | No | Yes | Role: Amigo Ximena 1 |
| 2009 | Daniel & Ana | No | No | No | Yes | Role: Amigo Borracho |
| 2013 | Nosotros los Nobles | Yes | Yes | Yes | Yes | Role: Santiago |
| 2019 | Mentada de padre | No | Yes | Yes | No | |
| 2021 | Pourris gâtés | No | No | Associate | No | French remake of Nosotros los Nobles |
| 2022 | Father of the Bride | Yes | No | No | No | |

=== Television ===
| Year | Title | Credited as | | | Notes |
| Year | Title | Director | Writer | Producer | Notes |
|---|---|---|---|---|---|
| 2015–2019 | Club de Cuervos | Yes | Yes | Yes | Creator; Directed 20 episodes Wrote 5 episodes Edited 11 episodes |
| 2018 | The Ballad of Hugo Sánchez | No | No | Executive | Creator |
| 2026 | La oficina | Yes | No | Executive | Directed 2 episodes |
