= José Luís Restán =

Spanish journalist and television presenter

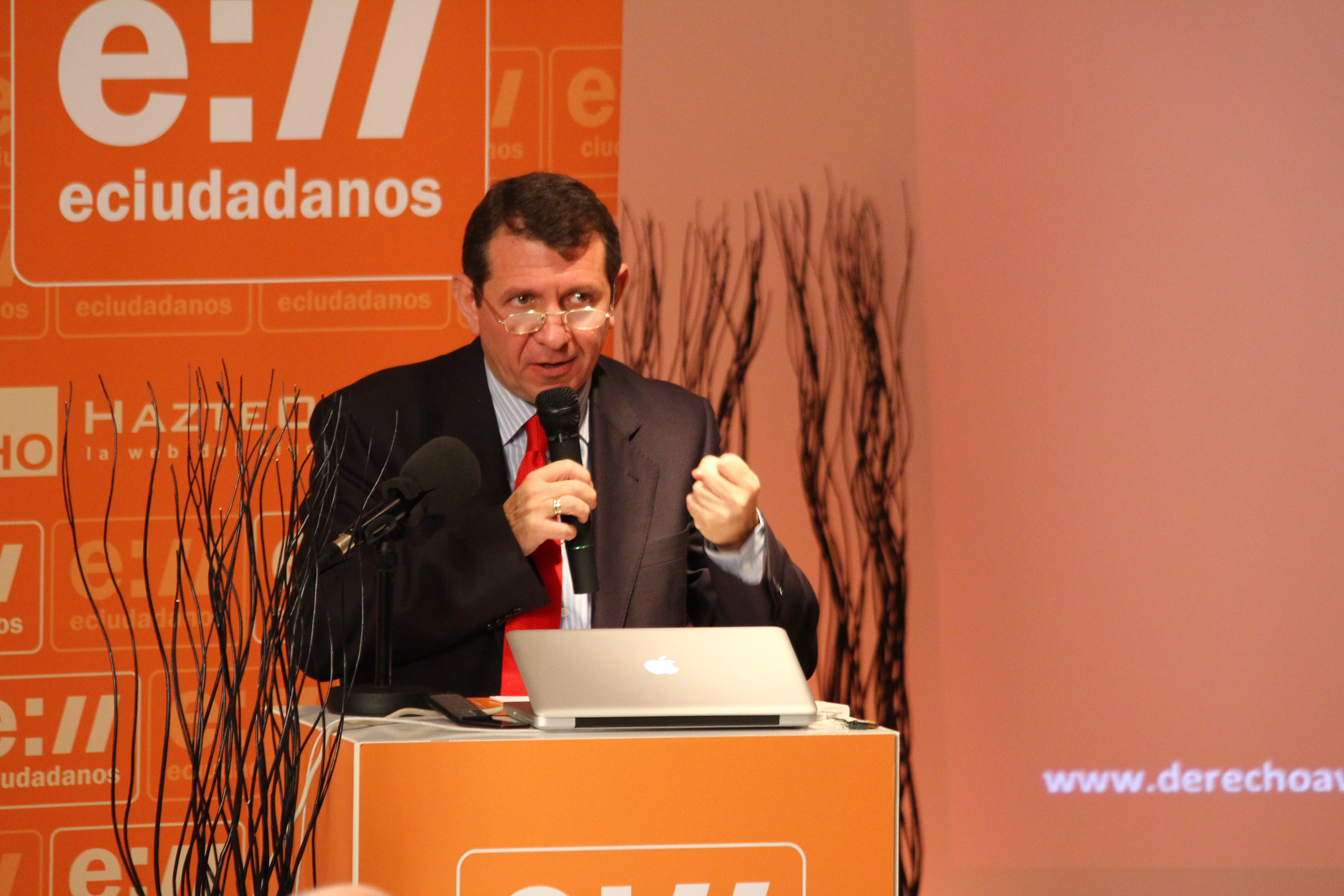
- Born: José Luís Restán Martínez; 1958 (age 67–68); Madrid, Spain
- Education: University of Navarre
- Occupations: Journalist; Radio broadcaster
- Years active: 1990 - present
- Employer: COPE

José Luís Restán Martínez (born 1958) is a Spanish journalist and radio broadcaster. He is the controller and editorial director of content and religious programming on radio station Cadena COPE, and is best known for his weekday religious talk show El Espejo.

== Early life ==
Restán was born in Madrid in 1958. He graduated in civil engineering at the University of Navarra, but instead followed a journalistic career, launching a Spanish edition of the Italian religious magazine 30 Days. He later returned to the University of Navarra to study journalism, and in 1990 joined Cadena COPE.

== Broadcasting career ==
He has been the main religious editor at Cadena COPE and for a while was the editor of news at the broadcaster. He then started to host daily religious news on COPE, one of which, El Espejo, he still hosts to this day. He also led the socioreligious content on COPE between January 2000 and July 2006. He later hosted the weekly programme Pueblo en camino on COPE's TV channel Popular TV. He also appeared on debate programmes on Trece. He is currently the content director of COPE and leader of its religious programming, and occasionally appears on Trece when its talk shows discuss religious content. He also writes for COPE's online site.

== Press ==
Restán has worked in Alfa y omega, the religious supplement of conservative newspaper ABC, and has written for ABC's news site. He has also worked on Mundo Cristiano, a family-oriented paper with religious content. With a group of students he founded the magazine Páginas para el mes in 1996.
