= Nosotros los Nobles =

- Theatrical release poster
- Directed by: Gary Alazraki
- Written by: Adrian Zurita; Patricio Saiz; Gary Alazraki
- Produced by: Gary Alazraki; Leonardo Zimbron
- Starring: Gonzalo Vega; Luis Gerardo Méndez; Karla Souza; Juan Pablo Gil; Karla Sofía Gascón (Note: Credited as Carlos Gascón); Ianis Guerrero
- Cinematography: Jose Casillas
- Edited by: Jorge García
- Music by: Benjamin Shwartz
- Production company: Alazraki Films
- Distributed by: Warner Bros. Pictures
- Release date: March 28, 2013
- Running time: 108 minutes
- Country: Mexico
- Language: Spanish
- Box office: $26,094,935

Nosotros los Nobles, also called The Noble Family and We Are the Nobles, is a 2013 Mexican dark comedy film directed by Gary Alazraki, starring Gonzalo Vega, Luis Gerardo Méndez, Karla Souza and Juan Pablo Gil, with Ianis Guerrero, Karla Sofía Gascón and Mario Haddad in supporting roles.

== Plot ==
Located in modern Mexico City, The Noble Family tells the story of a wealthy Mexican businessman, Germán Noble, and his three grown children, Javier, Bárbara, and Carlos.

Being always busy at his job, Germán doesn't realize that his kids are doing nothing with their lives, while carelessly spending his money. He never touches the subject, for he attributes their attitude to the depression his children feel in the wake of their mother's death.

Though Javier works in his father's construction company (in theory), he spends most of his time partying with friends. When not socializing, he dreams up unrealistic and often impossible projects that are often mocked by his father's business partner, Anwar Karim. Hoping to motivate Javier, Germán tells him he plans to leave the company to him in the future, and so he charges Javier with bigger responsibilities. Javier instead flies to Miami with his friends, leaving a subordinate to take his place at a very important business function.

Bárbara is a socialite about to get engaged to Peter, a man 20 years older than her, who's left several failed businesses in bankruptcy. He's hoping that Bárbara's trust fund will help him pay off his enormous tax debt. Germán is against said engagement, but Bárbara pays no attention to him and starts planning the wedding

Carlos, Germán's youngest child, is a hipster that has been expelled from college for being caught by the dean having sex with Lucía, one of his teachers.

Germán's frustration finally leads him to a heart attack. While in the hospital, he decides to give his children a lesson and a taste of the real world. He tells them that union troubles and an embezzling partner have led the government to freeze his assets and that, as shareholders of the company, the whole family could end up in prison. Germán convinces them to hide and cut off all contact with friends and relatives (to protect his charade), and move into a dilapidated house his father owned in a modest area of Mexico City. The children will also have to support themselves, which means getting jobs for the first time in their lives.

A friend's father helps Carlos get a job as a bank teller, while Lucho, nephew of the family's old maid, helps Bárbara find work as a waitress and Javier as a bus driver.

With a house falling down around them and bills to pay, the three immediately find themselves struggling to make ends meet. Their new situation causes them to see things in a new light. Bárbara discovers that Lucho, who she used to think of as poor and unworthy of her time, is actually a nice guy. Javier sees his old party friends as shallow hangers-on. Carlos starts to create some discipline in his life. Germán also learns a lot from his children during this time, and is dismayed to learn that Bárbara has bulimia, Javier is dyslexic and that he himself often spent too much time at work while they were growing up.

Meanwhile, Peter, Bárbara's boyfriend, finds out the family's hideout and the truth about Germán's scheme. Once he finds out it's all just a plot to teach the kids a lesson, he tries to blackmail Germán into giving him power over Bárbara's trust fund. Germán refuses, but in the process he's forced to admit the truth to his children. The revelation generates a feeling of anger and distrust in them. However Bárbara realises that Peter's only intention was to obtain her money, and breaks with him. Disappointed, the three siblings decide to distance themselves from their father, keep their jobs and fully repair the old house.

Germán's wish to see his children mature and live independently is finally accomplished, even though they break all contact with him. Carlos leaves the bank and gets a real job, Javier opens a business of his own, and Bárbara and Lucho get engaged.

By the end of the film we see Gérman knocking on the now-restored front door of the old house. His children open it, and he asks for forgiveness. They reconcile, acknowledging that everything was for a greater good.

After the credits, Peter is inside a prison cell, for his tax debts, as two fellow inmates approach to molest him.

== Cast ==
- Gonzalo Vega as Germán Noble
- Karla Souza as Bárbara "Barbie" Noble
- Luis Gerardo Méndez as Javier "Javi" Noble
- Juan Pablo Gil as Carlos "Charlie" Noble
- Ianis Guerrero as Lucho
- Karla Sofía Gascón as Peter / Pedro Pintado
- Quezali Cortés as Gilberto Marín
- Mariana Villalvazo Martín as Girlfriend of "Charlie" Noble
- Mario Haddad as Anwar Karim
- Alberto Zeni as Juan Pablo
- Mary Paz Mata as Margarita the nanny
- Carlos Alazraki as The dean of the college
- Ana Karina Guevara as Carmen
- Mariana Braun as Teacher Lucía
- Marell Cano as Danny
- Gary Alazraki (cameo) as Santiago

== Filming ==
The movie was filmed on location in Mexico City.

== Influences ==
The film's plot was taken from the 1949 Mexican film The Great Madcap directed by Luis Buñuel, starring Fernando Soler and Rosario Granados.

== Home media ==
The film was released on Blu-ray Disc and DVD in July 2013. As well as continue to be a hit

== Box office ==
The movie debuted in fourth position on March 22 taking more than US$964,000. But the good reception of the movie and public recommendations, led to the film taking first place in its fourth weekend, taking US$1.9 million, by that point, the film had taken almost US$15 million making it the most successful Mexican film of all time. After 15 weeks in the Mexican Box Office top 10, the film reached $26 million and currently is the sixth highest-grossing film in the Mexican Box Office in 2013.

== Remakes ==
The film has been remade in Italy as Belli di papà in 2015, in Colombia as Malcriados in 2016, and in France as Pourris gâtés in 2021. An English-language remake is being developed at Netflix, with Chris Columbus, Michael Barnathan, and Alazraki producing.

== See also ==
- List of highest-grossing Mexican films
