= José María Martínez (footballer, born 1947) =

Argentine footballer

Personal information
- Date of birth: 3 July 1947
- Place of birth: Corrientes, Argentina
- Date of death: 22 April 2012 (aged 64)
- Place of death: Buenos Aires, Argentina
- Position: Midfielder

Senior career*
Years	Team	Apps	(Gls)
1967–1968	San Lorenzo	7	(0)
1968–1970	Quilmes		
1971	Gimnasia y Esgrima La Plata	30	(3)
1972	Deportivo Cali	31	(4)
1973–1975	Deportes Quindío		
1976	Deportivo Cuenca		
1977	Unión de Santa Fe		
1978	Lanús	3	(0)
1979	Temperley		
- * Club domestic league appearances and goals

José María Martínez (born 3 July 1947) was an Argentine former footballer.
