= Jesús Zavala (actor) =

Mexican actor and singer (born 1993)

- Born: September 16, 1993 (age 33); Guadalajara, Jalisco, Mexico
- Occupations: Actor; singer
- Years active: 2002–present

Jesús Zavala (born Jesús Esparza Zavala on September 16, 1993, in Guadalajara, Jalisco) is a Mexican actor and singer.

== Biography ==
He first appeared on the reality TV show Código F.A.M.A. that launched his career as a singer and an actor. He has since appeared on telenovelas such as Alegrijes y Rebujos, Mision S.O.S, and Pablo y Andrea. Also, he worked in the telenovelas Atrevete a Soñar and Esperanza del Corazón.

== Television ==
- Cada Minuto cuenta, temp 1 y temp 2 (2024, 2025–) – Dr. Carlos
- Supertitlán (2022–) – Jonás Encinas
- La Balada de Hugo (2019) – Hugo Sánchez
- Club de Cuervos (2015–2019) – Hugo Sánchez
- Esperanza del Corazón (2011–12) – Hugo Martinez "Wampi"
- Atrevete a Soñar (2009)-(2010) – Roger
- Querida Enemiga (2008) – as Ivan
- Pablo y Andrea (2005) – Nicolas
- Misión S.O.S (2004–05) – Chaneque
- Alegrijes y rebujos (2003–04) – Esteban Dominguez
- Codigo F.A.M.A. (2002–03) – as himself

== Film ==
- All Inclusive (2008) – Andres
- "Malaventura" (2011) – Damian Martínez
- "La Boda de Valentina" (2018) – Bernardo
- "Dime Cuando Tú" (2020) – Will
