= José María Martínez (canoeist) =

Spanish canoeist (born 1968)

José María Martínez Ochoa de Zabalegui (born 11 March 1968 in Huesca) is a Spanish slalom canoeist who competed from the late 1980s to the early 1990s. He finished 35th in the K-1 event at the 1992 Summer Olympics in Barcelona.
