= Carlos Alazraki =

Mexican advertising executive

Carlos Alazraki Grossmann (born October 8, 1947 in Mexico City) is a Mexican advertising executive. Alazraki is the founder, president, and CEO of Alazraki & Asociados Publicidad agency and the previous president of the Asociación Mexicana de Agencias de Publicidad (AMAP, Mexican Association of Advertising Agencies). He is the son of film director Benito Alazraki and son-in-law of the late Samy Yeroham, owner of Topeka. He is also the father of director Gary Alazraki.

== Career ==
Alazraki studied Information Science and Techniques at the Universidad Iberoamericana (UIA).

He started his career in the United States with the Hal Greenfader, Publicis Romero and JWT agencies, later to Spain to work at Ibérica Televisión where he shot 13 television shows and a film with his father, Benito Alazraki. Returning to Mexico, he worked for Telesistema Mexicano (now Televisa) with Luis de Llano Sr.; after a merger and the formation of Televisa, Alazraki and his colleague Adolfo Rodríguez were retained.

In 1970, Alazraki joined Canal 13 of Imevisión (now TV Azteca), a then government-owned company, as director of programming. During that time, he formed the advertising agency Alazraki-Rodríguez Publicidad with Adolfo Rodríguez, that later became Alazraki & Asociados Publicidad. He created the slogan Bienestar para tu familia for Zedillo in 1994. In 1996 he produced the short film, Directamente al cielo (Straight to heaven).

He worked in the campaigns of Carlos Hank, Luis Donaldo Colosio, Ernesto Zedillo and Roberto Madrazo in the PRI primaries for the 2003 Mexican elections In 2005, he replaced Roberto Gaudelli for the image management of Roberto Madrazo for the 2006 Mexican presidential elections. For Madrazo he created the slogan Dale un Madrazo al dedazo, a play on words using the candidate's last name "Madrazo" which, within different contexts, is a memorable Spanish word.

Alazraki's agency has managed the image of Grupo Sanborns for 15 years, and Telmex and Sección Amarilla (Mexico's Yellow Pages) for 12 years, Posadas and Victoria beer for 8 years, and Comex for 10 years. Alazraki is developing television projects for Canal 40.

He judged the FIAP Buenos Aires in 1991, and The New York Festival, for which he was an advisor, in 1995.

He has been a member of the Advertising Hall of Fame since 1991.

== Films ==
- Directamente al cielo (1996) producer
