= 57th Ariel Awards =

2015 Mexican film awards

- Date: May 27, 2015

Highlights
- Best Picture: Güeros
- Most awards: Güeros (5)
- Most nominations: Güeros (12)

The 57th Ariel Awards ceremony, organized by the Mexican Academy of Film Arts and Sciences (AMACC) took place on May 27, 2015, in Mexico City. During the ceremony, AMACC presented the Ariel Award in 25 categories honoring films released in 2014. Güeros received five awards out of 12 nominations, including Best Picture and Best Director for Alonso Ruizpalacios. Cantinflas, Obediencia Perfecta, and Las Oscuras Primaveras followed with three awards; La Tirisia and Visitantes with two; and Seguir Viviendo, Relatos Salvajes, H20mx, El Penacho de Moctezuma. Plumaria del México Antiguo, El Modelo de Pickman and Ramona with one.

== Awards ==
Winners will be listed first and highlighted with boldface.

**Best Picture**: **Güeros**; Carmín Tropical; La Dictadura Perfecta; Guten Tag, Ramón; Las Oscuras Primaveras	**Best Director**: **Alonso Ruizpalacios** – **Güeros**; Ernesto Contreras – Las Oscuras Primaveras; Luis Estrada – La Dictadura Perfecta; Rigoberto Perezcano – Carmín Tropical; Jorge Ramírez-Suárez – Guten Tag, Ramón
**Best Actor**: **Juan Manuel Bernal** – **Obediencia Perfecta** **as Father Ángel de la Cruz**; Kristyan Ferrer – Guten Tag, Ramón as Ramón; Tenoch Huerta – Güeros as Sombra; Óscar Jaenada – Cantinflas as Cantinflas; Harold Torres – González as González	**Best Actress**: **Adriana Paz** – **La Tirisia** **as Cheba**; Irene Azuela – Las Oscuras Primaveras as Pina; Cassandra Ciangherotti – Las Horas Contigo as Ema; Karina Gidi – La Guerra de Manuela Jankovic as Manuela; Ilse Salas – Güeros as Ana
**Best Supporting Actor**: **Noé Hernández** – **La Tirisia** **as Canelita**; Luis Alberti – Carmín Tropical as Modesto; Carlos Bardem – González as Pastor Elías; Alonso Echánove – Cuatro Lunas as Joaquín Cobo; Álvaro Guerrero – Eddie Reynolds y los ángeles de acero as Ulises	**Best Supporting Actress**: **Isela Vega** – **Las Horas Contigo** **as Abu**; Mercedes Hernández – La Tirisia; Margarita Sanz – Las Oscuras Primaveras as María; Cecilia Suárez – Las Oscuras Primaveras as Flora; Mima Vikovic – La Guerra de Manuela Jankovic as Lazla
**Breakthrough Male Performance**: **Sebastián Aguirre** – **Obediencia Perfecta** **as Julian Sacramento Santos**; Sebastián Aguirre – Güeros as Tomás; Daniel Carrera – La Fórmula del Doctor Funes as Doctor Funes; Alejandro Gallardo – Somos Mari Pepa as Alex; Hayden Meyenberg – Las Oscuras Primaveras as Lorenzo	**Breakthrough Female Performance**: **Nora Isabel Huerta** – **Seguir Viviendo**; Gabriela Cartol – La Tirisia as Ángeles Miguel; Vico Escorcia – Eddie Reynolds y los ángeles de acero as Lucía; Petra Iñiguez – Somos Mari Pepa; Magda Ortíz – La Tirisia
**Best Original Screenplay**: **Carmín Tropical – Rigoberto Perezcano**; La Dictadura Perfecta – Luis Estrada and Jaime Sampietro; González – Fernando del Razo and Christian Díaz; Güeros – Alonso Ruizpalacios; Guten Tag, Ramón – Jorge Ramírez-Suárez	**Best Adapted Screenplay**: **Obediencia Perfecta** – **Ernesto Alcocer and Luis Urquiza from Perversidad by Ernesto Alcocer**; Canon: Fidelidad al Límite – Mauricio Walerstein and Claudia Nazoa from Canon by Jesús Reyes Heroles; La Fórmula del Doctor Funes – José Buil from La Fórmula del Doctor Funes by Francisco Hinojosa
**Best Ibero-American Film**: **Relatos Salvajes (Argentina) – Damián Szifron**; Conducta (Cuba) – Ernesto Daranas; La Isla Mínima (Spain) – Alberto Rodríguez; Mr. Kaplan (Uruguay) – Álvaro Brechner; Pelo Malo (Venezuela) – Mariana Rondón	**Best First Feature Film**: **Güeros – Alonso Ruizpalacios**; González – Christian Díaz; Los Bañistas – Max Zunino; Las Horas Contigo – Catalina Aguilar; Obediencia Perfecta – Luis Urquiza
**Best Documentary Feature**: **H2Omx – José Cohen**; Bering. Equilibrio y Resistencia – Lourdes Grobet; Eco de la Montaña – Nicolás Echeverría; Los Años de Fierro – Santiago Eisteinou; Navajazo – Ricardo Silva	**Best Documentary Short Subject**: **El Penacho de Moctezuma. Plumaria del México Antiguo – Jaime Kuri**; El Palacio – Nicolás Pereda; Jefe del Desierto – Alejandro Ramírez; Perreus – Kalien Delgado; Ulterior – Sabrina Muhate
**Best Animated Feature Film**: Not awarded	**Best Animated Short**: **El Modelo de Pickman – Pablo Angeles Zuman**; El Color de Mis Alas – Miguel Anaya; El Trompetista – Raúl Alejandro Morales; Tierra Seca – Ricardo Torres; Tlacuache de Maguey – Miguel Anaya
**Best Original Score**: **Las Oscuras Primaveras – Emmanuel del Real, Renato del Real, and Ramiro del Real**; Carmín Tropical – Luca Ortega; Eco de la Montaña – Mario Lavista; Güeros – Tomás Barreiro; Somos Mari Pepa – Kenji Kishi Leopo	**Best Live Action Short**: **Ramona – Gioavanna Zacarias**; 400 Maletas – Fernanda Valadez; Ella – Ximena Urrutia; La Carta – Ángeles Cruz; Nunca Regreses – Leonardo Díaz
**Best Sound**: **Güeros – Isabel Muñoz, Pedro González, Gabriel Teyna, and Kyoshi Osawa**; **Las Oscuras Primaveras – Enrique Ojeda and Enrique Greiner**; Carmín Tropical – Pablo Tamez and Ruy García; González – Axel Muñoz, José Miguel Enríquez and Pablo Fernández; La Dictadura Perfecta – Santiago Núñez, Pablo Lach and Hugo de la Cerda	**Best Film Editing**: **Las Oscuras Primaveras – Valentina Leduc**; Carmín Tropical – Miguel Schverdfinger; Güeros – Yibrán Asuad and Ana García; Guten Tag, Ramón – Jorge Ramírez-Suárez, Sonia Sánchez and Sam Baixauli; La Dictadura Perfecta – Mariana Rodríguez
**Best Art Direction**: **Cantinflas – Christofer Lagunes**; Güeros – Sandra Cabriada; La Dictadura Perfecta – Salvador Parra; La Guerra de Manuela Jankovic – Antonio Muñohierro and Mariana Fernández; Obediencia Perfecta – Julieta Álvarez	**Best Cinematography**: **Güeros – Damián García**; Carmín Tropical – Alejandro Cantú; Guten Tag, Ramón – Carlos Hidalgo; La Tirisia – César Gutiérrez; Las Oscuras Primaveras – Tonatiuh Martínez
**Best Makeup**: **Cantinflas – Maripaz Robles**; Carmín Tropical – Maripaz Robles; Eddie Reynolds y los ángeles de acero – Felipe Salazar; El Crimen del Cácaro Gumaro – Roberto Ortíz, Felipe Salazar and Elena López; La Dictadura Perfecta – Felipe Salazar	**Best Costume Design**: **Cantinflas – Gabriela Fernández**; Carmín Tropical – Laura García de la Mora; Eddie Reynolds y los ángeles de acero – Gabriela Fernández; La Dictadura Perfecta – Mariestela Fernández; Obediencia Perfecta – Josefina Echeverría
**Best Special Effects**: **Visitantes – Ricardo Arvizu**; El Crimen del Cácaro Gumaro – Ricardo Arvizu; La Dictadura Perfecta – Alejandro Vázquez; La Fórmula del Doctor Funes – Nury Álamo and Karina Rodríguez; Más Negro Que la Noche – Bernat Aragonés	**Best Visual Effects**: **Visitantes – Charlie Iturriaga**; Cantinflas – Marco Rodríguez; Eddie Reynolds y los ángeles de acero – Fabián García, Cyntia Navarro and Paula Siqueira; El Crimen del Cácaro Gumaro – Paula Siqueira, Michael Hoffmann, Raúl Prado, Cyntia Navarro and Charlie Iturriaga; La Dictadura Perfecta – Adriana Arriaga

== Special awards ==
- Golden Ariel – Bertha Navarro
- Special Silver Ariel – Miguel Vázquez
- Special recognition – José Emilio Pacheco, Gabriel García Márquez, and Vicente Leñero

== Multiple nominations and awards ==
The following sixteen films received multiple nominations:

Nominations	Film
12	Güeros
10	Carmín Tropical
10	La Dictadura Perfecta
9	Las Oscuras Primaveras
6	Guten Tag, Ramón
6	Obediencia Perfecta
6	La Tirisia
5	Cantinflas
5	Eddie Reynolds y los ángeles de acero
5	González
3	El Crimen del Cácaro Gumaro
3	La Fórmula del Doctor Funes
3	Las Horas Contigo
3	La Guerra de Manuela Jankovic
3	Somos Mari Pepa
2	Visitantes

Films that received multiple awards:

Awards	Film
5	Güeros
3	Cantinflas
3	Obediencia Perfecta
3	Las Oscuras Primaveras
2	La Tirisia
2	Visitantes
