= Olga Segura =

Mexican actress and producer

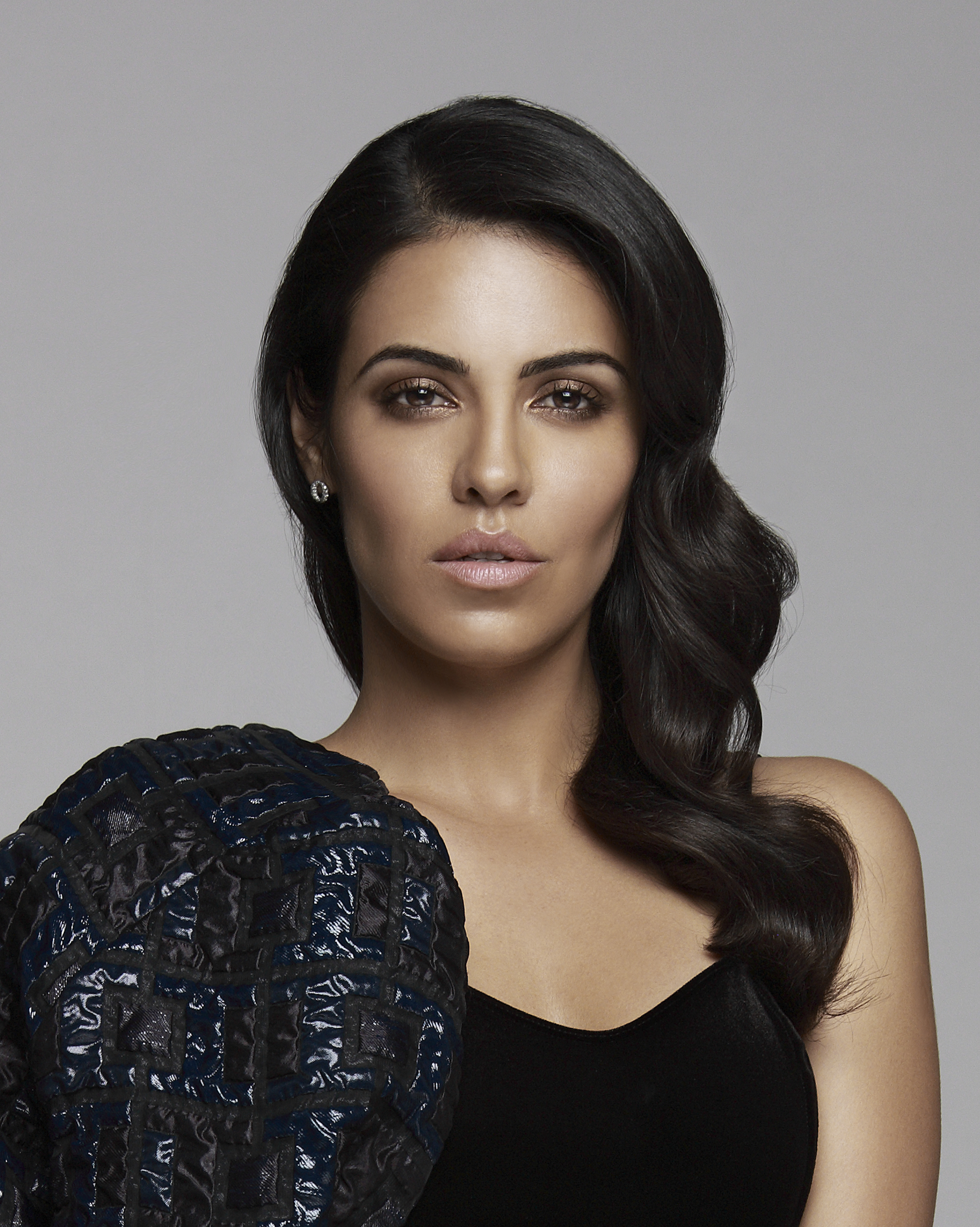
- Born: Olga Segura Guerra; Mexico City, Mexico
- Occupations: Actress, producer
- Years active: 2005–present
- Website: olgasegura.com

Olga Segura is a Mexican actress and producer.

== Biography ==
While working in Mexico in 2009 Segura formed her own production company, Producciones a Ciegas, with her brother Juan Carlos Segura and actor Héctor Jiménez. Since then the company has helped to finance and produce eight feature films.

Segura started acting and producing early in her career with the 2011 film Cellmates directed by Jesse Baget, she played a supporting role to acting heavyweights Tom Sizemore and Stacy Keach. She produced and acted in Goats, which was shown in the Premieres Section of Sundance 2012. After that Segura produced and starred in Mexican writer-director Omar Ynigo's feature debut Marcelo with Aarón Díaz, Laura Zapata and Héctor Jiménez. The film premiered at the 2012 Morelia International Film Festival and was exhibited at the 2013 Guadalajara International Film Festival and the 2013 Ischia Film Festival in Italy.

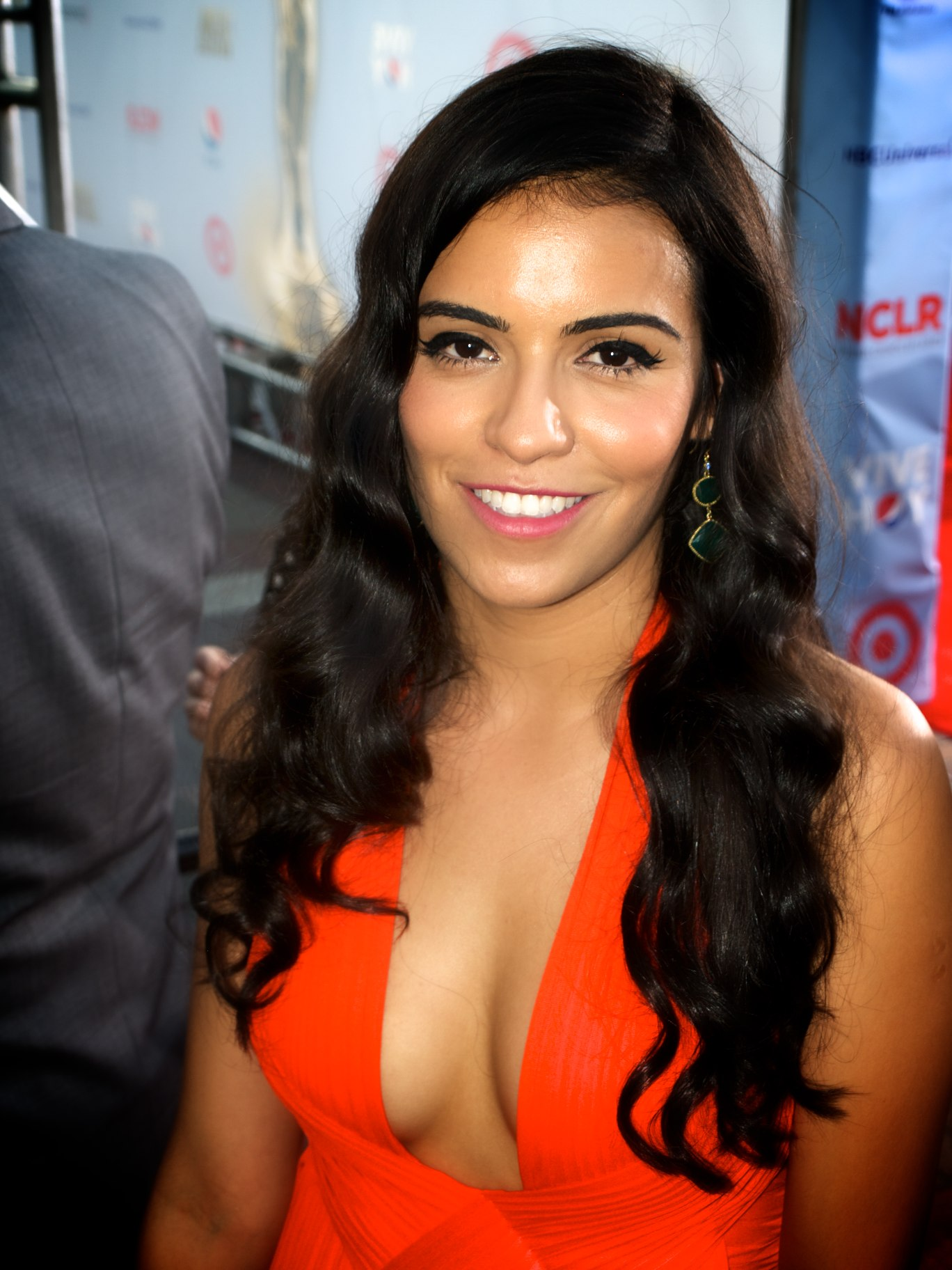
Segura at the 2012 Alma Awards

Sundown, by Mexican director Fernando Lebrija, is being distributed by VideoCine in Mexico sold domestically by Creative Artists Agency (CAA) and is set for a worldwide release in 2016. In González: falsos profetas, directed by Christian Diaz Pardo, Segura stars with Carlos Bardem and Harold Torres. The film gained favorable reviews and won two awards in the Feature Film Competition at the 2013 Morelia International Film Festival. Border Run, by Argentinian director Gabriela Tagliavini, was nominated for Best Feature at the 2012 Imagen Awards. In the film Segura played a supporting role to international stars Sharon Stone and Billy Zane. Segura co-starred with Colombian model and actress Carolina Guerra in La Luciernaga by Colombian writer-director Ana Maria Hermida. The film premiered in the Female Filmmakers New Mavericks section of the 2015 Atlanta Film Festival and also screened in La Habana, Cuba at the 37th Annual Festival Internacional del Nuevo Cine Latinoamericano.

In 2015 Segura appeared on the History Channel mini-series Texas Rising directed by Roland Joffé, starring Bill Paxton, Brendan Fraser and Jeffrey Dean Morgan. Additionally, she appeared in 16 episodes of Telemundo hit American telenovela Señora Acero.

Segura will be starring in the psychological thriller Veronica directed by Carlos Algara and Alejandro Martinez-Beltran where she is the co-lead with four-time Ariel Award nominee Arcelia Ramírez. The film won the Roma Lazio Blood Award for post-production funding at the 2015 Ventana Sur Film Market. Segura will appear with Manolo Cardona and Paz Vega in the 14-episode series La Hermandad (The Brotherhood) directed by Carlos Bolado and Humberto Hinojosa. La Hermandad is one of the latest pieces of original content to come out of Mexican streaming service ClaroVideo and is set to be released in 2016.

Segura and Producciones a Ciegas helped to finance and produce The Truth About Emanuel written and directed by Francesca Gregorini starring Jessica Biel, Kaya Scodelario and Alfred Molina. The film premiered at the 2013 Sundance Film Festival in the US Dramatic Competition, won 2 awards while screening at the Ashland Independent Film Festival and went on to a limited theatrical release in multiple markets across the US.

Along with colleagues Caldecot Chubb and Eva Maria Daniels, Segura helped develop and prepare The Dinner, which was shot in New York in January and February 2016. The film was adapted by Oren Moverman from the worldwide best-selling novel by Herman Koch, and starred Richard Gere, Steve Coogan, Laura Linney and Rebecca Hall.

== Filmography ==
- Veronica, 2017
- Mexiwood, 2016
- Sundown, 2016 as Hotel Clerk
- The Firefly, 2015 as Mariana
- Little Paradise, 2015 as Lupita
- González: falsos profetas, 2013 as Betsabé
- The Garden of Steven, 2012 as Magdalena
- Border Run (2012)
- Hidden Moon, 2011 as Inés
- Marcelo, 2011 as Lucy
- Goats (2012)
- Cellmates (2011)

== TV shows ==
- Texas Rising (TV mini-series), 2015 as Concepcion
- Señora Acero, 2014 as Edith Phillips
- El encanto del águila, 2011 as Filomena del Valle

== Theater ==
- Pizza Man (adapted to Spanish language) directed by Eduardo Arroyuelo, as Julie
- When Will I Dance as Frida directed by Celia Cotelo
- The House Of Bernarda Alba as Adela directed by Steve Helgot
