= Sebastián Aguirre (actor) =

Mexican actor

- Born: Sebastián Matías Aguirre Boëda; March 9, 1998 (age 28); Mexico City, Mexico
- Other name: Sebastián Aguirre Boëda
- Occupation: Actor
- Years active: 2008–present

Sebastián Matías Aguirre Boëda (born 1998) is a Mexican actor. Son of musicians, Aguirre began acting as a child with a screen debut in the short films ¡Volar! and La Canción de los Niños Muertos (2008). His breakthrough performance was as Julián "Sacramento" Santos in Obediencia Perfecta (2014) in which he played a victim of sexual abuse by a priest, earning an Ariel Award for Breakthrough Male Performance. He subsequently appeared in another film, Güeros (2014), for which he also received another Ariel nomination, and the thriller Un Monstruo de Mil Cabezas (2015), portraying a teenager helping his mother to convince an insurance company to provide a treatment for her husband. Aguirre also is featured in the films Herederos. La vida inmoral de la pareja ideal (2016), directed by Manolo Caro.

== Background ==
Aguirre was born in Mexico City, Mexico, in 1998. His parents are violin players, and since childhood he was exposed to art expressions. At age 8, his mother took him to take courses at CasAzul, a Mexican drama school, and there he decided to become an actor. About his acting career, Aguirre does not want to repeat himself, "it happens that when you get a role you got stuck on it, but I want diversity in order to show that my layers as an actor". His favorite films include Trainspotting, La Piel Que Habito and El Castillo de la Pureza and also wants to specialize in film directing.

== Career ==
Aguirre debuted on the short-films ¡Volar! and La Canción de los Niños Muertos in 2008. The latter film, about five teenagers who lose their mother, was directed by Mexican filmmaker David Pablos, and won for Best Fiction Short Film at the Morelia International Film Festival and was screened during the Critics' Week of the 2009 Cannes Film Festival. This work, earned Pablos the Ariel Award for Best Live Action Short and also the SIGNIS Award during the 4th International Short Film Festival (FICMEX), being the SIGNIS jury's verdict that "the film narrative takes us into the complexity of disparate feelings as violence and tenderness, anger and forgiveness, rebellion and reconciliation."

At age 12, he auditioned for the role of Julián "Sacramento" Santos, a child sexually abused by a priest, on the film Obediencia Perfecta directed by Luis Urquiza. He filmed two years later, and along with the other 30 child actors involved in the film, Aguirre was accompanied at all times by his parents, psychologists, lawyers and a coach (Margarita Mandoki) who worked with the actors many months before filming. Aguirre agreed to participate in the movie, since there was a message to give, and after seeing the completed film stated: "I thought it would be morbid, but every scene was carefully made. What I liked about the film is that you only see what you have to see". Since the screenplay was partially based on the Sexual scandal of Marcial Maciel, the founding leader and general director of the Legion of Christ, Aguirre was asked about his religious orientation by the Mexican newspaper El Universal, and declared himself as atheist. Aguirre's performance was met with positive reviews, including Ronnie Scheib of Variety magazine, who stated that the actor "succeeds admirably in casting his beatific good looks in a postcard-perfect saintly light".

Aguirre's following film was Güeros directed by Alonso Ruizpalacios in the role of Tomás, a teenager sent from Veracruz to Mexico City by his mom to live with his older brother (Tenoch Huerta). About working on the film, Aguirre said it was an experience "with great fraternity; Ilse (Salas), Tenoch (Huerta) and Leonardo (Ortizgris) got along very well and that was reflected in the movie, I had a lot of fun doing it". Güeros received twelve nominations for the 57th Ariel Awards in Mexico, including Best Picture and Best Direction, and Aguirre earned a double nomination for Breakthrough Male Performance for this film and his work on Obediencia Perfecta. About this recognition, Aguirre said: "I did not expect it, I am very proud... I can get better things, it is not something that assures me that I will have more work, but it is a gradual advance that makes me proud". Aguirre won the Ariel and the Diosa de Plata for Obediencia Perfecta.

In 2015, Aguirre participated on a rally held at the Guanajuato International Film Festival, where a short film has to be made in 48 hours. After that he joined the cast of the film Un Monstruo de Mil Cabezas, directed by Rodrigo Plá. The film, about a wife (Jana Raluy) that tries to take justice into her own hands after a health-insurance company refuses to approve the care of her dying spouse with the help of her son (Aguirre), was met with critical acclaim, and Godfrey Cheshire of RogerEbert.com, praised Aguirre's performance in this film and his previous one (Güeros). The same year he acted on Herederos directed by Jorge Hernández and co-starred with Dario Yazbek on the film Mi Sangre, which was shot on location in Mexico, France and England.

Aguirre is featured on Manolo Caro's La vida inmoral de la pareja ideal (2016), as the young version of Lucio, who meets Martina (Ximena Romo) in high-school, they fall in love and separate shortly after, and 25 years later they meet again by chance. He worked in France in the film Los Paisajes (2016) portraying a teenager fleeing from boarding school to meet his brother in Paris and taking a trip to the French countryside, where the fraternal relationship is confronted by a tragic event.

== Filmography ==
Film roles
Year	Title	Roles	Notes
2008	¡Volar!	Beto	Short film
2008	La canción de los niños muertos	Younger son	Short film
2010	Contraluz	Santiago	Short film
2012	Tucán	Sebastián	Short film
2014	Güeros	Tomás	
2014	Obediencia perfecta	Julián "Sacramento" Santos	
2015	A Monster with a Thousand Heads	Darío Castrejón Bonet	
2015	Los herederos	Ruco	
2015	Los paisajes	Alonso	
2016	Siempre contigo	Mateo	Short film
2016	La vida inmoral de la pareja ideal	Lucio 17 Years Old	
2017	Dos ballenas	Nicolás	Short film
2018	Alex Winter	Alex	
