= List of Mexican films of 2013 =

This is a list of Mexican films released in 2013.

Title	Director	Cast	Genre	Notes
The Golden Dream	Diego Quemada-Díez	Brandon López, Rodolfo Domínguez, Karen Noemí Martínez Pineda	Drama	Winner - A Certain Talent award and François Chalais Award - Special Mention at the 2013 Cannes Film Festival, Winner - Best Director at Havana Film Festival New York
H2Omx	José Cohen & Lorenzo Hagerman		Documentary	Winner - Best Feature Documentary at the 2015 Ariel Award.
Heli	Amat Escalante	Armando Espitia, Andrea Vergara, Linda González, and Juan Eduardo Palacios	Crime, Drama	Winner Prix de la mise en scène at the 2013 Cannes Film Festival.
Instructions Not Included	Eugenio Derbez	Eugenio Derbez, Jessica Linnsey, Loreto Peralta, Daniel Raymont, Alessandra Rosaldo	Comedy-drama	Made $99,067,206 worldwide.
Nosotros los Nobles	Gary Alazraki	Gonzalo Vega, Luis Gerardo Méndez, Karla Souza, Juan Pablo Gil	Comedy	Made $26,094,935 worldwide.
We Are Mari Pepa	Samuel Kishi	Alejandro Gallardo, Arnold Ramírez, Rafael Andrade Muñoz, Moisés Galindo, Petra Iñiguez Robles	Comedy-drama	Nominated - Crystal Bear - Generation 14plus at the 64th Berlin International Film Festival Nominated - Breakthrough Male Performance, Breakthrough Female Performance & Best Original Score at the 57th Ariel Awards

== See also ==
- List of 2013 box office number-one films in Mexico
