= Verónica (2017 Mexican film) =

Veronica
- Directed by: Carlos Algara; Alejandro Martinez-Beltran
- Written by: Carlos Algara, Tomas Nepomuceno
- Produced by: Juan Carlos Segura G Carlos Algara; Alejandro Martinez-Beltran
- Starring: Olga Segura; Arcelia Ramirez; Sofia Garza
- Cinematography: Miguel Angel Gonzalez Avila
- Edited by: Eugenio Richer; Luis de la Madrid
- Release date: 2017
- Country: Mexico
- Language: Spanish

Veronica is a 2017 Mexican psychological thriller starring Olga Segura, and Arcelia Ramirez.

== Plot ==
A female psychologist who has stopped practicing medicine, decides to take the case of Veronica de la Serna, a young woman whose previous therapist has mysteriously disappeared. The psychologist requires Veronica to stay with her in her country house for the duration of the treatment. Here, they will both discover what lies behind their deepest secrets.

== Release ==
Veronica was theatrically released in Mexico on August 25, 2017, and it remained in theaters for 4 weeks. As of October 30, 2017, the film was released internationally by Netflix.

== Reception ==
=== Critical reception ===
On review aggregator website Rotten Tomatoes, the film holds an approval rating of 75% based on 8 reviews, and an average rating of 6.8/10.

=== Awards ===
The film received The Roma Lazio Film Commission Award at the Ventana Sur Film Market in Argentina (Blood Window Section) in 2015. The prize, consisting of post-production services and DCP mastering, went to Carlos Algara and Alejandro Martinez Beltran’s Mexican thriller “Veronica,” produced by Producciones a Ciegas. Veronica was also selected by the Instituto Mexicano de Cinematografía (IMCINE) to participate in the European Film Market at Berlin International Film Festival, in February 2017, as part of Visions Berlin, at the Mexico in Focus Section of the Market. The film also competed for the Mezcal Prize at the 32nd Guadalajara International Film Festival in March, 2017. And it was nominated for Best Ibero-american Film at the 13th Fantaspoa International Fantastic Film Festival of Porto Alegre in May, 2017. Carlos Algara and Alejandro Martínez Beltrán won the Best New Director award at the 43rd Huelva Latin American Film Festival for this film. Main actress, Arcelia Ramírez, received a nomination for Best Actress at the 60th Ariel Awards for this film and won the Silver Goddess given by the Mexican Journalists Association for Best Actress at the 47th Diosas de Plata award ceremony in 2018.
