= González: falsos profetas =

- Theatrical release poster
- Directed by: Christian Díaz Pardo
- Written by: Christian Díaz Pardo; Fernando del Razo
- Produced by: Laura Pino; Harold Torres
- Starring: Harold Torres; Carlos Bardem
- Cinematography: Juan Pablo Ramírez
- Edited by: León González; León Felipe González
- Music by: Galo Durán
- Production companies: Chacal Filmes; ECHASA
- Release dates: October 2013 (MIFF); February 27, 2015 (Mexico)
- Running time: 100 minutes
- Country: Mexico
- Languages: Spanish; English
- Budget: $9 million Mexican pesos

González: falsos profetas (lit. 'González: false prophets') is a 2013 Mexican thriller film directed by Christian Díaz Pardo (in his directorial debut) and written by Pardo & Fernando del Razo. The film stars Harold Torres and Carlos Bardem. The film was named on the shortlist for Mexico's entry for the Academy Award for Best Foreign Language Film at the 87th Academy Awards, but it was not selected.

== Synopsis ==
González will find in religion the easy way to settle his debts and obtain more money. A confrontation will break out between his own ambition and his true personality.

== Cast ==
The actors participating in this film are:

- Harold Torres as González
- Carlos Bardem as Elías Pastor
- Olga Segura as Betsabé
- Gaston Peterson as Pablo
- Miguel Angel Fragoso as Enrique
- Natalia Benvenuto as Pretty woman bus
- Adrian García as Human resources manager
- Rubí González as Secretary
- Catalina López as Pastor's Secretary
- Alvaro Hernández as Shepherd's apprentice
- Sandra Macedo as Mrs. testimonial
- Alan Martínez as Mr. testimonial
- Lesly Mejia as Bank executive
- Victor Pérez as Mr. safe room
- Hernan Romo as Shepherd's guard
- Hector Sánchez as Counter
- Patricia Torres as Contest program host
- Franz Wusterhaus as Call center manager

== Release ==
It had its world premiere at the end of October 2013 at the 11th Morelia International Film Festival. It was commercially released on February 27, 2015, in Mexican theaters.

== Reception ==
=== Critical reception ===
On the review aggregator website Rotten Tomatoes, 100% of 7 critics' reviews are positive, with an average rating of 6.8/10.

Lucero Solórzano from Excelsior positively highlighted the film's plot because it manages to captivate the viewer, adequately maintaining the rhythm of events, generating good suspense and the remarkable acting quality of Harold Torres and Carlos Bardem. Alejandro Alemán from El Universal described this as an intelligent production that does not remain on the surface of other urban thrillers, but seeks to delve into the business of religion.

=== Accolades ===
Year	Award	Category	Recipient	Result	Ref.
2013	Morelia International Film Festival	Best Actor	Harold Torres	Won	
2013	Morelia International Film Festival	Best Actor	Carlos Bardem	Won	
2014	International Film Festival of Aguascalientes	Best Feature Film	Christian Díaz Pardo	Won	
2014	Festival of the New Mexican Cinema of Durango	Critics' Jury Award - Best Film	Christian Díaz Pardo	Won	
2014	Montreal World Film Festival	Golden Zenith for Best First Feature	Christian Díaz Pardo	Won	
2014	Icarus International Film Festival	Best Fiction Feature Film	Christian Díaz Pardo	Won	
2014	Pantalla de Cristal Film Festival	Best Film	Christian Díaz Pardo	Nominated	
2014	Pantalla de Cristal Film Festival	Best Director	Christian Díaz Pardo	Nominated	
2014	Pantalla de Cristal Film Festival	Best Script	Christian Díaz Pardo & Fernando del Razo	Won	
2014	Pantalla de Cristal Film Festival	Best Actor	Harold Torres	Nominated	
2014	Pantalla de Cristal Film Festival	Best Actress	Olga Segura	Nominated	
2014	Pantalla de Cristal Film Festival	Best Editing	León Felipe González	Nominated	
2014	Pantalla de Cristal Film Festival	Best Art Direction	Alisarine Ducolomb	Nominated	
2014	Pantalla de Cristal Film Festival	Best Casting	Harold Torres	Nominated	
2015	Diosas de Plata	Best Film	Christian Díaz Pardo	Nominated	
2015	Diosas de Plata	Best Actor	Harold Torres	Won	
2015	Fribourg International Film Festival	Grand Prix	Christian Díaz Pardo	Won	
2015	Ariel Awards	Best First Work	Christian Díaz Pardo	Nominated	
2015	Ariel Awards	Best Actor	Harold Torres	Nominated	
2015	Ariel Awards	Best Supporting Actor	Carlos Bardem	Nominated	
2015	Ariel Awards	Best Original Screenplay	Christian Díaz Pardo	Nominated	
2015	Ariel Awards	Best Sound	Axel Muñoz, José Miguel Enríquez & Pablo Fernández	Nominated	
