= Days of Grace (film) =

2011 film

- Film poster
- Spanish: Días de gracia
- Directed by: Everardo Gout
- Written by: Everardo Gout
- Produced by: Everardo Gout; Leopoldo Gout
- Starring: Carlos Bardem; Kristyan Ferrer
- Cinematography: Luis Sansans
- Edited by: Hervé Schneid; José Salcedo
- Music by: Nick Cave; Warren Ellis; Atticus Ross; Claudia Sarne; Shigeru Umebayashi
- Release date: 17 May 2011 (CFF)
- Running time: 133 minutes
- Country: Mexico
- Language: Spanish

Days of Grace (Spanish: Días de gracia) is a 2011 Mexican crime film written and directed by Everardo Gout.

== Cast ==
- Carlos Bardem - Victima X
- Kristyan Ferrer - Iguana / Doroteo
- Tenoch Huerta - Teacher / Lupe
- Dolores Heredia - Susana
