= Semana santa (disambiguation) =

Semana santa (Holy Week) is the most sacred week in the liturgical year in Christianity.

Semana santa may also refer to:

- Semana Santa (2002 film), a European film
- Semana Santa (2015 film), a Mexican film
