= Eddie Reynolds y los ángeles de acero =

- Theatrical release poster
- Directed by: Gustavo Moheno
- Written by: Gustavo Moheno; Carlos Enderle; Angel Pulido
- Produced by: Gustavo Moheno; Sandrine Molto; Angel Pulido
- Starring: Damián Alcázar; Arturo Ríos
- Production companies: Producciones Abracadabra; Chemistry
- Release dates: October 19, 2014 (FICM); August 27, 2015 (Mexico)
- Running time: 107 minutes
- Country: Mexico
- Language: Spanish

Eddie Reynolds y los ángeles de acero (lit. 'Eddie Reynolds and the Steel Angels') is a 2014 Mexican romantic comedy directed by Mario Muñoz and written by Moheno, Carlos Enderle & Angel Pulido. Starring Damián Alcázar & Arturo Ríos.

== Synopsis ==
When Bono from U2 is interested in buying one of the songs of an old rock band, the members of the band will meet again after 30 years to get the band back together. Soon, the fifty-year-olds start playing again as Lucía, the drummer's teenage daughter, updates their rock image.

== Cast ==
The actors participating in this film are:

- Damián Alcázar as Eddie Reynolds
- Arturo Ríos as Santos
- Jorge Zárate as Fernando
- Álvaro Guerrero as Ulises
- Paulina Gaitán as Natalia
- Dolores Heredia as Teresa
- Vico Escorcia as Lucía
- Sebastián Zurita as Tony Rivas
- Pavel Sfera as Bono
- Fernando Villa Proal as Santos Jr.
- José Sefami as Gallo
- Luis Fernando Peña as Betito
- Mónica Maci as Jackie
- Alfonso Figueroa as Traveling Musician
- Kristyan Ferrer as Young Lalo
- Carlos Lopez Tavera as Young Santos
- Erando González as The Teacher
- Gregg Lucas as Mr. Paul
- Javier De la Vega as Joey
- Mailys Guibert as Tony's Secretary
- Luis Alberti as Wedding Groom
- Lilia Mendoza as Wedding Bride
- Ricardo Kleinbaum as Dr. Benavides
- Claudia Pineda as Waitress
- Alfonso Bravo as Bully

== Production ==
Principal photography began on October 28, 2013, in Mexico City, it was also filmed in Veracruz, Mexico.

== Release ==
It had its world premiere on October 19, 2014, at the 12th Morelia International Film Festival. It was commercially released on August 27, 2015, in Mexican theaters.

== Reception ==
=== Critical reception ===
On the review aggregator website Rotten Tomatoes, 69% of 13 critics' reviews are positive, with an average rating of 6.7/10.

Jesús Chavarría from Cine Premiere highlights the chemistry between the actors since they manage to offer very funny moments, but he is also critical that the messages and themes that the film touches on were never fully exploited and that it could have been more than a simple comedy. Salvador Franco Reyes from Excelsior criticizes the lack of good jokes, opting for cheap and simple humor, he also negatively criticizes the production values in general.

=== Accolades ===
Year	Festival / Award	Category	Recipient	Result	Ref.
2014	Morelia International Film Festival	Best Mexican Feature Film	Gustavo Moheno	Nominated	
2014	Hermosillo International Film Festival	Best Mexican Feature Film	Gustavo Moheno	Nominated	
2014	Hermosillo International Film Festival	Best Actor	Damián Alcázar	Won	
2015	Ariel Award	Best Supporting Actor	Álvaro Guerrero	Nominated	
2015	Ariel Award	Breakthrough Female Performance	Vico Escorcia	Nominated	
2015	Ariel Award	Best Costume Design	Gabriela Fernandez	Nominated	
2015	Ariel Award	Best Makeup	Felipe Salazar	Nominated	
2015	Ariel Award	Best Visual Effects	Cyntia Navarro, Paula Siqueira & Fabian García	Nominated	
2016	Diosas de Plata	Best Supporting Actor	Arturo Ríos	Nominated	
2016	Diosas de Plata	Best Newcomer - Female	Vico Escorcia	Nominated	
