= The Black Minutes (film) =

- Film poster
- Directed by: Mario Muñoz
- Written by: Mario Muñoz; Martín Solares
- Produced by: Juan Manuel Borbolla; Rodrigo Calderon; Rodrigo Durán; Daniela Leyva Becerra Acosta; Mónica Lozano; Andres Martinez-Rios; Mario Muñoz; Faride Schroeder; Ricardo Tenorio Huerta; Andrea Toca; Monica Vargas Celis; Leonardo Zimbrón
- Starring: Leonardo Ortizgris
- Production companies: Voces Imaginarias; Traziende Films
- Distributed by: IM Global
- Release dates: October 28, 2021 (FICM); October 31, 2021 (Mórbido Fest); January 25, 2023 (Vix+)
- Running time: 88 minutes
- Country: Mexico
- Language: Spanish

The Black Minutes (Spanish: Los minutos negros) is a 2021 Mexican crime thriller film directed by Mario Muñoz and written by Muñoz & Martín Solares. Starring Leonardo Ortizgris. It is based on the novel of the same name by Martín Solares.

== Synopsis ==
Vicente Rangel, a musician turned detective, embarks on a police case to catch a murderer of girls in a corrupt oil town on the Gulf of Mexico.

== Cast ==
The actors participating in this film are:

- Leonardo Ortizgris as Vicente Rangel
- Kristyan Ferrer as "El Macetón"
- Enrique Arreola as Romero
- Sofía Espinosa as "La Chilanga"
- Carlos Aragón as Travolta
- Mauricio Isaac as Agent Calatrava
- Waldo Facco as The Jackal
- Pedro Hernández as Chuy
- Héctor Holten as Lucilo Rivas
- Hector Kotsifakis as Prieto
- Tiaré Scanda as Lolita
- José Sefami as Commander García
- Paloma Woolrich as Dr. Ridaura

== Release ==
The Black Minutes had its international premiere on October 28, 2021, at the 19th Morelia International Film Festival, to then premiere 3 days later at Mórbido Fest 2021. It premiered on January 25, 2023, on Vix+.

== Reception ==
=== Critical reception ===
Ángel Horta from Revista Purgante highlighted the quality of the performances of the entire cast, the beautiful shots and photography, and the punctuality of the production design to place us in the Mexico of the 70s, however, he described the soundtrack as somewhat repetitive. Álvaro Cueva from Milenio also praised the performances of the cast, highlighting the performance of Kristyan Ferrer, also highlighting the script and how it reflects the Mexican reality.

=== Accolades ===
Year	Award	Category	Recipient	Result	Ref.
2022	San Diego Latino Film Festival	Best Narrative Feature	Mario Muñoz	Won	
2022	Ariel Award	Best Actor	Leonardo Ortizgris	Nominated	
2022	Ariel Award	Best Supporting Actor	Kristyan Ferrer	Won	
2022	Ariel Award	Best Adapted Screenplay	Mario Muñoz & Martín Solares	Nominated	
2022	Ariel Award	Best Cinematography	Federico Barbabosa	Nominated	
2022	Ariel Award	Best Art Direction	Ivonne Fuentes	Won	
2022	Ariel Award	Best Costume Design	Abril Alamo	Won	
2022	Ariel Award	Best Makeup	Roberto Ortiz	Nominated	
2022	Ariel Award	Best Visual Effects	Luis Montemayor	Nominated	
