= Total Loss =

Total Loss may refer to:

- Total loss, an insurance claim term
- Total Loss (2000 film), a Dutch drama film
- Total Loss (2024 film), a Mexican black tragicomedy film
- Total Loss (album), a 2012 album by How to Dress Well
- "Total Loss", a song by Kayak from the album Periscope Life
