= Cellmates =

2011 film directed by Jesse Baget

- Directed by: Jesse Baget
- Written by: Jesse Baget
- Produced by: Ryan R. Johnson; J. Daniel Bort
- Starring: Tom Sizemore; Stacy Keach; Kevin Farley; Héctor Jiménez; Olga Segura
- Cinematography: Bill Otto
- Edited by: Jesse Baget
- Release date: April 29, 2011 (Newport Beach International Film Festival)
- Country: United States
- Language: English

Cellmates is a 2011 American comedy film starring Tom Sizemore, and Olga Segura and was directed and written by producer, director, and writer Jesse Baget.

== Plot ==
Leroy Lowe is a racist who throughout his life has hated everything that was not as white as the color of his skin. Unexpectedly immersed in Mexican culture Leroy is forced to decide whether to return to his old life back in the United States or start a new life under the sun-drenched skies of Mexico.

== Reception ==
Currently, the film has a rating of 47% on Rotten Tomatoes, based on 15 reviews and an average score of 4.33/10.
