= Sin nombre (film) =

2009 film directed by Cary Fukunaga

- Theatrical release poster
- Directed by: Cary Joji Fukunaga
- Written by: Cary Joji Fukunaga
- Produced by: Amy Kaufman
- Starring: Paulina Gaitán; Edgar Flores; Kristyan Ferrer
- Cinematography: Adriano Goldman
- Edited by: Luis Carballar; Craig McKay
- Music by: Marcelo Zarvos
- Production companies: Primary Productions; Canana Films; Creando Films
- Distributed by: Focus Features (United States); Universal Pictures (Mexico)
- Release dates: January 18, 2009 (Sundance); March 20, 2009 (United States); May 15, 2009 (Mexico)
- Running time: 96 minutes
- Countries: Mexico; United States
- Language: Spanish
- Box office: $7 million

Sin nombre (English: "Nameless") is a 2009 adventure thriller film written and directed by Cary Joji Fukunaga, about a Honduran girl trying to immigrate to the United States, and a boy caught up in the violence of gang life.

Diego Luna and Gael García Bernal were executive producers on the Spanish-language film. Sin nombre won awards for directing and cinematography at the 2009 Sundance Film Festival.

== Plot ==
Willy, nicknamed El Casper, is a member of the Mara Salvatrucha gang and lives in Tapachula, a Mexican town near the border with Guatemala. He introduces a young boy into his gang, and the boy is given the nickname Smiley after a violent initiation. Casper later helps Smiley to complete this initiation by helping him execute a rival gang-member.

Casper is romantically involved with a girl, Martha Marlen. Fearing for her safety, he keeps the relationship a secret from his gang, but his double life causes his gang to doubt his loyalty. When Martha follows Casper to a gathering of his gang, the gang leader, Lil Mago, escorts her out, despite Casper's misgivings. Mago attempts to rape Martha and accidentally kills her. Later, he blithely tells Casper that he will find another girl.

Shortly afterward, Mago brings Casper and Smiley to La Bombilla, a location along the train tracks where potential illegal immigrants stow away on passing trains on their way to the United States. Among the immigrants is a Honduran family introduced earlier, consisting of the teenage girl Sayra, her father, and her uncle, who are on their way to relatives in New Jersey. Lil Mago, Casper, and Smiley rob the passengers for any money they have until Lil Mago spots Sayra and attempts to rape her. Casper intervenes, killing Mago and then sending Smiley off.

Smiley goes back to the gang and reports Mago's death. The gang's new leader, El Sol accuses Smiley of collusion, to which Smiley timidly protests and begs to be sent to kill Casper to prove his loyalty. El Sol agrees and Smiley travels north to track down Casper. On the train, the still distraught Casper is avoided by other passengers. When some try to throw him off the train, Sayra warns Casper. She keeps on approaching him, despite her father's warnings. Casper's knowledge from previously smuggling gang members and avoiding the police proves useful, as he eludes his pursuers. He is finally accepted by Sayra's family but decides to leave the train while the others are sleeping. Unbeknownst to him, Sayra follows him. Meanwhile, her father and uncle decide to continue the journey.

Traveling north on a car transport organized by a friend of Casper, Casper and Sayra barely escape a trap laid for them and enter an immigrant shelter, where Sayra sees a familiar face. She is informed that her father has died and her uncle has been caught. In disbelief, she rushes off to cry at the chapel, where Casper comforts her. They reach a river that constitutes the border to the United States. A coyote agrees to take them across one by one. Casper pays the man with his camera containing the cherished pictures of his girlfriend and insists that Sayra go first. When she is halfway across, the gang appears and begins to chase Casper. He flees the pursuing gang but runs into Smiley, who shoots him once, then slowly two more times. The others arrive and proceed to empty their magazines into Casper, while Sayra struggles to hold onto the raft and screams.

The closing scenes show Sayra phoning her father's new family from outside an American mall, her uncle setting off on another attempt to cross the border, and Smiley having his lip tattooed as a sign of his loyalty to the gang.

== Cast ==
- Paulina Gaitán as Sayra
- Edgar Flores as Willy ("El Casper")
- Kristyan Ferrer as Benito ("El Smiley")
- Tenoch Huerta Mejía as Lil Mago
- Diana García as Martha Marlene
- Héctor Jiménez as Wounded Man / Leche
- Gerardo Taracena as Horacio
- Luis Fernando Peña as El Sol

== Production ==
The film was shot mostly in Mexico City. Locations were found there resembling as closely as possible Tegucigalpa and the train station in Tapachula.

The film was also shot in Torreón, Coahuila, Mexico. Several extras were actual migrants. Fukunaga said of working with them, "I didn't have to tell them anything—they know how to sit on top of a train."

== Reception ==
The film holds an 88% rating on the review website Rotten Tomatoes. The site's consensus states: "Part harrowing immigration tale, part gangster story, this debut by writer/director Cary Fukunaga is sensitive, insightful and deeply authentic." On Metacritic, the film has a 77% score based on reviews from 22 critics, indicating "generally favorable reviews".

== Awards ==
Awards
Award	Category	Recipient(s)	Result
Austin Film Critics Association Awards	Best Foreign Language Film		Won
British Independent Film Awards 2009	Best Foreign Film		Nominated
Broadcast Film Critics Association Awards	Best Foreign Language Film		Nominated
Chicago Film Critics Association Awards
Chicago Film Critics Association Awards	Best Foreign Language Film		Nominated
Chicago Film Critics Association Awards	Most Promising Filmmaker	Cary Joji Fukunaga	Nominated
Dallas-Fort Worth Film Critics Association Awards	Best Foreign Language Film		Won
Deauville American Film Festival	Jury Prize (tied)		Won
EDA [Alliance of Women Film Journalists] Award	Best Non-English-Language Film		Nominated
2009 Edinburgh International Film Festival	Skillset New Directors Award	Cary Joji Fukunaga	Won
Indiana Film Journalists Association Award	Best Foreign Language Film		Won
Spirit Awards
Spirit Awards	Best Feature		Nominated
Spirit Awards	Best Director	Cary Joji Fukunaga	Nominated
Spirit Awards	Best Cinematography	Adriano Goldman	Nominated
2009 Sundance Film Festival Awards (U.S. Dramatic Competition)
2009 Sundance Film Festival Awards (U.S. Dramatic Competition)	Directing Award	Cary Joji Fukunaga	Won
2009 Sundance Film Festival Awards (U.S. Dramatic Competition)	Excellence in Cinematography	Adriano Goldman	Won
2009 Stockholm International Film Festival Awards
2009 Stockholm International Film Festival Awards	Best First Feature		Won
2009 Stockholm International Film Festival Awards	Best Actor	Edgar Flores	Won
2009 Stockholm International Film Festival Awards	FIPRESCI International Film Critics Prize for Best Film		Won
St. Louis Film Critics Awards	Best Foreign Language Film		Nominated

== See also ==
- Children's immigration crisis
