= Border Run =

- Original movie poster
- Directed by: Gabriela Tagliavini
- Written by: Don Fiebiger; Amy Kolquist
- Produced by: Lucas Jarach; Jason Price
- Starring: Sharon Stone; Billy Zane; Miguel Rodarte; Olga Segura; Rosemberg Salgado
- Cinematography: Andrew Strahorn
- Edited by: James Coblentz
- Music by: Emilio Kauderer; Sebastián Kauderer
- Production company: Voltage Pictures
- Distributed by: Anchor Bay Entertainment
- Release date: October 12, 2012
- Running time: 96 minutes
- Country: United States
- Language: English

Border Run (earlier title The Mule) is a 2012 American mystery thriller film directed by Gabriela Tagliavini. The film was released on DVD in February 2013. Sharon Stone stars as an American reporter who searches for her missing brother. The film depicts human smuggling across the United States/Mexican border.

== Plot ==
Sofie Talbert is a hard-hitting journalist against illegal immigration to the United States. Learning that her brother in Mexico has gone missing, she goes to find him and uncovers the brutal reality of the desperate people who risk their lives to cross into the States.

== Cast ==
Actor	Role
Sharon Stone	Sofie Talbert
Billy Zane	Aaron Talbert
Miguel Rodarte	Javier
Manolo Cardona	Roberto
Olga Segura	Maria
Giovanna Zacarías	Juanita
Rosemberg Salgado	Rafael

== Recognition ==
Border Run earned a nomination for Best Feature Film at the 2013 Imagen Foundation Awards.

== Reception ==
The film has been described as "Stone's Taken". A mixed review in PEP found the film "lacking heart" while The Japan Times stated that it was "raught with old-school spy aesthetics."

== Themes ==
The film points out that some illegals are twice-removed from their country of origin, having crossed from Central America into Mexico and then the United States, which increases the hazards they face.
