= We Are Mari Pepa =

- Film poster
- Directed by: Samuel Kishi
- Written by: Samuel Kishi; Sofía Gómez-Córdova
- Produced by: Laura Blanco; Alex Briseño; Toiz Rodríguez Iñiguez; Samuel Kishi
- Starring: Alejandro Gallardo; Arnold Ramírez; Rafael Andrade Muñoz; Moisés Galindo; Petra Iñiguez Robles
- Production companies: Teonanacatl Audiovisual; Cebolla Films
- Release dates: 23 October 2013 (FICM); 10 November 2013 (AFI Fest); February 2014 (Berlinale); 14 March 2015 (Villeurbanne)
- Running time: 95 minutes
- Country: Mexico
- Language: Spanish

We Are Mari Pepa (Spanish: Somos Mari Pepa) is a 2013 Mexican comedy-drama film directed by Samuel Kishi (in his directorial debut) and written by Kishi & Sofía Gómez-Córdova. It features Alejandro Gallardo, Arnold Ramírez, Rafael Andrade Muñoz, Moisés Galindo and Petra Iñiguez Robles. It is based on the 2011 short film Mari Pepa by the same director.

== Synopsis ==
Alex is a 16-year-old teenager who has 3 goals for his summer. First, create together with your rock band a new song. Second, get a job. And lastly, having your first sexual experience. During his summer he will realize that his grandmother begins to need more help from him, then he will understand that he must mature and learn to say goodbye.

== Cast ==
The actors participating in this film are:

- Alejandro Gallardo as Alex
- Arnold Ramírez as Bolter
- Moisés Galindo as Moy
- Rafael Andrade as Rafa
- Petra Iñiguez Robles as Grandmother
- Eduardo Covarrubias as Alex's father
- Víctor Osuna as Party extra

== Release ==
We Are Mari Pepa had its world premiere on October 23, 2013, at the Morelia International Film Festival. It also premiered on November 10, 2013, at the AFI Fest in Los Angeles, in February 2014 at the 64th Berlin International Film Festival and on March 14, 2015, at the Villeurbanne Festival Reflets du cinéma ibérique et Latino-américain in France.

== Reception ==
=== Critical reception ===
On the review aggregator website Rotten Tomatoes, 90% of 10 critics' reviews are positive, with an average rating of 5.4/10.

Clayton Dillard from Slant Magazine comments that the film works because of its massive interest in adolescent shock, where paralysis and uncertainty can only be momentarily heightened through gender outrage. Alissa Simon from Variety called the film charming primarily for Samuel Kishi and Sofía Gomez-Cordova's treatise on the screenplay, despite the episodic narrative at first seeming to wander, by the end, the precisely edited structure of rhyme and repetition long ago. that the whole adds up to more than the sum of its parts. Boyd van Hoeij from The Hollywood Reporter mentions that the director manages to expand his 2010 short film in this film, although in the end the story is not decided whether to focus only on Alex or on all the members of Mari Pepa, Samuel Kishi manages to reflect youth culture, also highlights the contagious spirit and juvenile that the young actors transmit without affectation in their characterizations.

=== Accolades ===
Year	Award	Category	Recipient	Result	Ref.
2014	Berlin International Film Festival	Crystal Bear - Generation 14plus	Samuel Kishi	Nominated	
2014	Miami International Film Festival	Ibero-American Opera Prima Award	Samuel Kishi	Nominated	
2014	Miami International Film Festival	Ibero-American Opera Prima Award - Special Mention	Samuel Kishi	Won	
2014	Toulouse Latin America Film Festival	Prix CCAS - Prix Des Électriciens Gaziers	Samuel Kishi	Won	
2014	Great Mexican Film Party	Best Film	Samuel Kishi	Won	
2014	Great Mexican Film Party	Best Director	Samuel Kishi	Won	
2014	Great Mexican Film Party	Best Actor	Alejandro Gallardo	Won	
2015	Ariel Awards	Breakthrough Male Performance	Alejandro Gallardo	Nominated	
2015	Ariel Awards	Breakthrough Female Performance	Petra Iñiguez Robles	Nominated	
2015	Ariel Awards	Best Original Score	Kenji Kishi	Nominated	
