= Cantinflas (film) =

- Theatrical release poster
- Directed by: Sebastian del Amo
- Written by: Edui Tijerina; Sebastian del Amo
- Produced by: Vidal Cantu; Adolfo K. Franco
- Starring: Óscar Jaenada; Michael Imperioli; Ilse Salas; Luis Gerardo Méndez; Gabriela de la Garza; Adal Ramones; Bárbara Mori
- Cinematography: Carlos Hidalgo
- Edited by: Nacho Ruiz Capillas
- Music by: Roque Baños
- Production company: Kenio Films
- Distributed by: Pantelion Films
- Release dates: August 29, 2014 (United States); September 18, 2014 (Mexico)
- Running time: 103 minutes
- Country: Mexico
- Languages: Spanish; English
- Box office: $17.8 million

Cantinflas is a 2014 Mexican biographical comedy-drama film directed by Sebastián del Amo. Based on the life of actor and comedian Mario Fortino Alfonso Moreno Reyes, the film stars Óscar Jaenada as the title character, Michael Imperioli, Ilse Salas, Bárbara Mori, Ana Layevska and Adal Ramones. It premiered on September 18, 2014 in Mexico. In the United States it was released on August 29, 2014. It was selected as the Mexican entry for the Best Foreign Language Film at the 87th Academy Awards, but was not nominated.

On December 12, 2014, José Miguel Insulza, Secretary General of the Organization of American States, gave a recognition to Producer Vidal Cantu and Director Sebastian del Amo in a special screening of Cantinflas in the Hall of the Americas in Washington, D.C. Ambassadors from the 34 countries members of the OAS were present in the event.

== Plot ==
The movie is told in non-chronological order, switching between the pre-production of Around the World in 80 Days in 1955 and scenes in Cantinflas' life between 1931 and 1955.

In 1955 Mike Todd is trying to court famous actors and performers from around the world to perform the film, but struggles as he is unable to pay them properly.

In 1931, Mario Moreno is an impoverished man living out of a suitcase working odd jobs. He is hired as a janitor for a small stage company. After failing as a boxer, then as a bullfighter, his boss gets him on the stage. His first act, dancing while wearing blackface, is ridiculed by the audience who begin to throw things at him. Forced back onto the stage after attempting to leave, he gets in an argument with a man who threw a shoe at him. This reveals his signature style of talking himself out of situations (known as Cantinfleando in Spanish) which the crowd adores and applauds him for.

His boss' daughter is infatuated him and tries to seduce him, he walks in on her taking his clothes off, and throws him out in disgust. However, Estanislao Shilinsky, an audience member who is connected with the theater industry of Mexico City, finds him out in the street and invites him to work there.

In Mexico City, Moreno starts doing comedy shows at Shilinsky's theater and falls in love with Valentina Ivanovna, one of his co-performers. Tensions arise when he insists on improvising many of his replies as he claims the dialogue written for his character does not fit him.

In 1933, he is heckled by a drunkard who asks him "en qué Cantina inflas" only for Moreno to integrate his question into the show and adopt the name Cantinflas. He and Ivanovna get married, and Moreno gets invited to progressively bigger shows.

In 1955, Todd has run into issues with scheduling and negotiations with his studio partners, and has to fly out to Mexico City to meet Moreno in person. He watches him fight a bull in a crowded arena and in a meeting with him delivers the script for Around the World in 80 Days. Moreno rejects him as he would have to leave the country and he has a rule of not working with studios. However, he promises to read the script.

In 1935, Moreno is working at a more posh theater alongside Manuel Medel and is discontented how his name is excluded from the ads. Nevertheless, he puts on a popular political satire show and soon enough gains prominence.

In 1955, Todd meets Charlie Chaplin who advises him on how to communicate with and convince Moreno.

By 1940, the film debut of Moreno in You're Missing the Point is again hit with production troubles (Moreno insisting on improvising his lines when the first directors wanted him to say exactly how it is in the script) but the film is a grand success and more come. Between film production and his involvement in the Confederation of Mexican Workers, he becomes more separated from his wife, and in 1945 she learns she is infertile. He gets more involved with actors' unions, public political protests, all while neglecting his wife.

The two stories finally converge - at a grand premiere at Teatro de los Insurgentes she finally has a breakdown and leaves him. Arriving at home, he gets drunk and finds the script of Around the World in 80 Days and decides to take part. He travels to Los Angeles, conveniently arriving just when Todd is about to be fired, he brings them the good news. He also reconciles with his wife who gives him some rules for his first Hollywood role. Though his producers want him to be more involved in future Hollywood films, he declines as he would rather be among his people and since he and his wife have decided to adopt a baby. At the 13th Golden Globes ceremony, he wins the Best Actor for Musical or Comedy award. The film closes with images of the real life characters, plus footage of him and his wife dancing on a film set.

== Cast ==
Actor(s)	Character
Óscar Jaenada	Cantinflas
Michael Imperioli	Mike Todd
Ilse Salas	Valentina Ivanova
Bárbara Mori	Elizabeth Taylor
Ana Layevska	Miroslava Stern
Luis Gerardo Méndez	Estanislao Shilinsky
Joaquín Cosío	Indio Fernández
Andrés Montiel	Agustín Isunza
Cassandra Ciangherotti	Estela Pagola
Eduardo España	Alejandro Galindo
Ximena Gonzalez-Rubio	María Félix
Adal Ramones	Mantequilla
Flor Payán	Lupita Tovar
José Sefami	Diego Rivera
Otto Sirgo	Andrés Soler
Giovanna Zacarías	Gloria Marín
Gabriela de la Garza	Olga Ivanova

== Reception ==
=== Critical response ===
Cantinflas received mixed reviews from critics. On Rotten Tomatoes, the film currently has a rating of 48%, based on 21 reviews, with an average rating of 5.8/10. The website's critical consensus states: "Cantinflas focuses on the idol instead of the man and in spite of Óscar Janeada's padrísimo performance, this biopic feels like the GIF of what could've been a contender". On Metacritic, the film currently has a rating of 45 out of 100, based on 5 critics, indicating "mixed or average reviews".

==== Accolades ====
===== Ariel Awards =====
The Ariel Awards are awarded annually by the Mexican Academy of Film Arts and Sciences in Mexico. Cantinflas received three awards out of five nominations.

Year	Nominee / work	Award	Result
2015	Óscar Jaenada	Best Actor	Nominated
2015	Christofer Lagunes	Best Art Direction	Won
2015	Maripaz Robles	Best Makeup	Won
2015	Gabriela Fernández	Best Costume Design	Won
2015	Marco Rodríguez	Best Visual Effects	Nominated

===== Other awards =====
Year	Award	Category	Nominated	Result
2014	Guadalajara Mexican Film Festival			
2014	Guadalajara Mexican Film Festival	Best Costume Design	Gabriela Fernandez; Kenio Films	Won
2014	Huelva Hispanic American Film Festival			
2014	Huelva Hispanic American Film Festival	Best actor	Óscar Jaenada	Won
2014	Huelva Hispanic American Film Festival	Audience Award	Cantinflas	Won

== See also ==
- List of submissions to the 87th Academy Awards for Best Foreign Language Film
- List of Mexican submissions for the Academy Award for Best Foreign Language Film
