= Leonardo Ortizgris =

Mexican actor

Leonardo Ortizgris is a Mexican actor. He is best known for his performance in Güeros and Museum for which he won the 2019 Ariel Award for Best Supporting Actor.

== Selected filmography ==
=== Film ===
Year	Title	Role	Notes
2012	She Doesn't Want to Sleep Alone	Pablo	
2014	Güeros	Santos	
2017	Opus Zero	Gilles	
2018	Museum	Benjamin Wilson	Ariel Award for Best Supporting Actor
2018	El club de los insomnes	Santiago	
2019	This Is Tomas	Leonardo	
2020	My Tender Matador	Carlos	
2021	The Black Minutes	Vicente Rangel	
2024	Mexico 86	Miguel	
2024	Non Negotiable	Vicente Zambrano	
2024	Total Loss	Claudio Gómez Restrepo	

=== Television ===
Year	Title	Role	Notes
2018	The Inmate	Florentino	
2019	Diablo Guardián		
