= Tales of an Immoral Couple =

- Directed by: Manolo Caro
- Written by: Manolo Caro
- Starring: Cecilia Suárez; Manuel García Rulfo; Sebastián Aguirre; Ximena Romo; Eréndira Ibarra
- Cinematography: Tonatiuh Martínez
- Edited by: Miguel Musálem; Yibran Asuad
- Production companies: Panorama Global; Mr. Wooo
- Distributed by: Cinépolis Distribución; Seven Films
- Release dates: 22 October 2016 (Morelia Film Festival); 28 October 2016 (Mexico)
- Running time: 91 minutes
- Country: Mexico
- Language: Spanish

Tales of an Immoral Couple (Spanish: La vida inmoral de la pareja ideal) is a 2016 Mexican romantic comedy written and directed by Manolo Caro. The film stars Cecilia Suárez, Ximena Romo, Manuel García Rulfo, and Sebastián Aguirre.

== Plot ==
Lucio and Martina are two teens who meet during their first years at a private Catholic school in San Miguel de Allende. Discovering an indescribable chemistry between them, they set out exploring their sexualities, falling deeper and deeper in love. The film tells their story in a series of flashbacks, with the actual plot taking place 25 years later after Martina and Lucio have been separated thanks to a scandal that ended their high school romance, but reunite thanks to a chance encounter in the street. The two then set about orchestrating fake spouses and families for themselves in order to impress the other, before a raucous dinner sets the record straight.

== Cast ==
- Cecilia Suárez as Martina
- Manuel García Rulfo as Lucio
- Sebastián Aguirre as Lucio 16 Years old
- Ximena Romo as Martina 17 Years old
- Natasha Dupeyrón as Amelia
- Eréndira Ibarra as Florentina Calle
- Javier Jattin as Balthazar
- Juan Pablo Medina as Igor
- Sofía Sisniega as Vilma
- Mariana Treviño as Beatriz
- Paz Vega as Loles
- Anilu Estevez as Beatriz 11 Years old
- Andrés Almeida as Vicente
