= The Popcorn Chronicles =

- Theatrical release poster
- Directed by: Emilio Portes
- Written by: Andrés Bustamante; Emilio Portes; Armando Vega Gil
- Produced by: Daniel Birman Ripstein; G. Pekas Lozano; Gabriel Ripstein; Christian Valdelièvre
- Starring: Andrés Bustamante
- Production companies: Fox International Productions; Alameda Films; Blu Films; Cinepantera
- Distributed by: 20th Century Fox
- Release date: 14 March 2014
- Running time: 95 minutes
- Country: Mexico
- Language: Spanish
- Box office: $4,757,098

The Popcorn Chronicles (Spanish: El crimen del cácaro Gumaro, lit. 'The crime of the Gumaro mite') is a 2014 Mexican parody film directed by Emilio Portes and written by Portes, Andrés Bustamante and Armando Vega Gil. The cast features Andrés Bustamante, Ana de la Reguera, Alejandro Calva, Carlos Corona and Jesús Ochoa. It premiered on March 14, 2014, in Mexican theaters.

== Synopsis ==
Don Toribio, knowing his death is coming calls his two sons, Gumaro and Archimboldo. Both return to Güépez (an imaginary Mexican town) to listen to their father's will. On his death bed, he stipulates that Archimboldo would keep a broken-down moving truck and that Gumaro would receive a cinema theatre, the Linterna Mújica (a pun on Lanterna Magica), provided he manages to make it profitable soon, otherwise it would pass into the hands of his older brother. The latter is preparing unfair competition in the hands of piracy. The brothers wage a mutual war that takes the town to the brink of destruction. While doing so, they pay homage to the great classics (old or recent) of Mexican Cinema.

== Cast ==
The actors participating in this film are:

- Andrés Bustamante as Don Cuino
- Ana de la Reguera as Claudianita
- Alejandro Calva as Archimboldo
- Carlos Corona as Gumaro
- Jesús Ochoa as Cochigordo
- Eduardo Manzano as Don Toribio
- Javier 'Chabelo' López as Himself
- Jorge Rivero as Jorge the Birdwatcher
- Armando Vega Gil as Bitter father
- Mónica Huarte as Faulina
- Marius Biegai as General Matherson
- Jaime Cancino as Customer Table
- Bruno Coronel as Boyfriend
- Kate del Castillo as Kate / Rosario
- Johanna Murillo as Orquidea
- Freddy Ortega as Lawyer Freddy
- German Ortega as Witness
- Alberto Rojas as Lord of the Table
- María Rojo as Maria cook
- Carmen Salinas as Herself
- José María Torre as Christ
- Víctor Trujillo as Brozo
- Mario Zaragoza as Castulo
- Alfonso Zayas as Teporocho

== Production ==
Principal photography began on January 14, 2013, in locations in the Federal District and in Salvatierra, Guanajuato, lasting 9 weeks.

== Reception ==
=== Box-office ===
In its first weekend it attracted 639,060 spectators to the cinema, collecting 28,830,000 Mexican pesos. For its second weekend, it raised 38,000,000 more pesos.

=== Accolades ===
Year	Award	Category	Recipient	Result	Ref.
2015	57th Ariel Awards	Best Make-Up	Roberto Ortíz, Felipe Salazar & Elena López	Nominated	
2015	57th Ariel Awards	Best Visual Effects	Paula Siqueira, Michael Hoffmann, Raúl Prado, Cyntia Navarro & Charlie Iturriaga	Nominated	
2015	57th Ariel Awards	Best Special Effects	Ricardo Arvizu	Nominated	
