= Vidal Cantu =

- Vidal Cantu
- Born: 1 March 1968 (age 58); Monterrey, Nuevo Leon, Mexico
- Occupations: Movie producer, Entrepreneur
- Spouse(s): Lilia O. Cavazos (m. 1993) 4 sons
- Children: Vidal, David, Laura and Francisco Cantu education = Universidad Autónoma de Nuevo León

Vidal Cantu (born March 1, 1968) is a Mexican film producer and entrepreneur based in Miami. He is the CEO and cofounder of Kenio Films a Production Company and Film distributor focused on inspirational content.

== Kenio Films ==
Cantu cofounded "Kenio Films" with cofounder and partner Adolfo Franco. They produced Cantinflas (film) on 2013
a biopic about iconic Mexican comedian Mario Moreno directed by Sebastian del Amo and starring Oscar Jaenada, Michael Imperioli, Ilse Salas and Luis Gerardo Mendez among other 95 actors. On August 29 of 2014 the company released Cantinflas (film) in the USA, on September 18 the movie was released in Mexico. Mexico's film academy has picked Cantinflas (film) as its submission for Academy Award for Best Foreign Language Film.
