= Ilse Salas =

Mexican actress (born 1981)

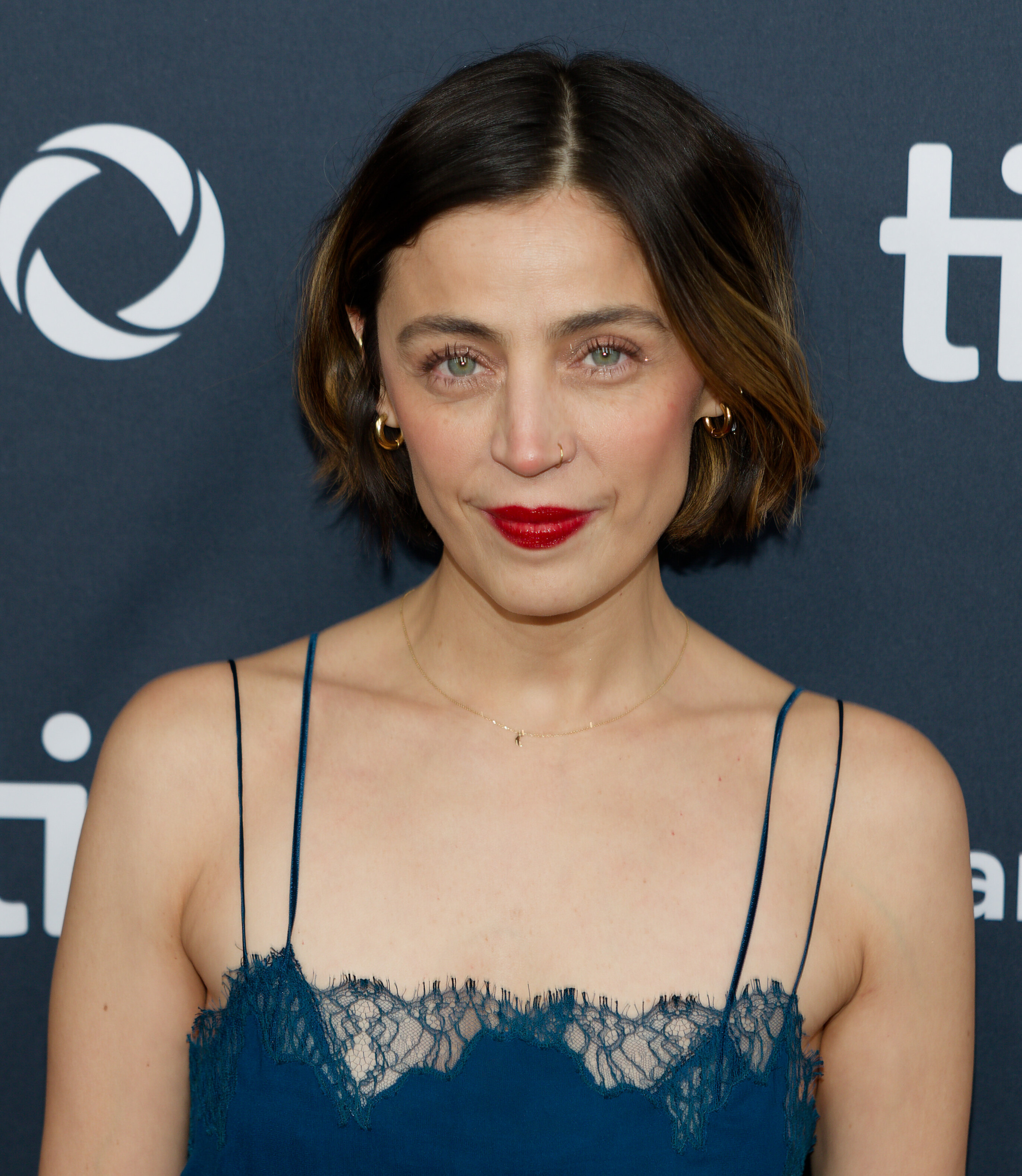
- Salas at the 2024 Toronto International Film Festival
- Born: 26 August 1981 (age 44); Mexico City, Mexico
- Occupation: Actress
- Years active: 2010–present

Ilse Salas (born 26 August 1981) is a Mexican actress. She appeared in more than fifteen films since 2010. For her lead role in the films Güeros and The Good Girls Salas received two nominations for the Ariel Award for Best Actress and won for the latter one.

== Filmography ==
=== Film roles ===
Year	Title	Roles	Notes
2010	Hidalgo	María Vicenta	
2012	Restos	Elena	
2013	Tercera llamada	Unknown role	
2014	Güeros	Ana	Nominated – Ariel Award for Best Actress
2014	Cantinflas	Valentina Ivanova	
2015	Capgras	Laura	Voice role; short film
2015	Sabrás qué hacer conmigo	Isabel	
2016	Me estás matando Susana	Andrea	
2016	Fuck My Life	Sofía	
2018	Museum	Silvia	
2018	The Good Girls	Sofía	Ariel Award for Best Actress
2019	Amores modernos	Rocío	
2021	Plaza Catedral	Alicia	Nominated – Ariel Award for Best Actress
2023	Familia	Rebeca	
2024	Pedro Páramo		
2025	The Follies		

=== Television roles ===
Year	Title	Roles	Notes
2010	Locas de amor	Sofía Arroyo	Main role; 25 episodes
2010	Mujeres asesinas	Claudiine	Episode: "Elena, protectora"
2012	Capadocia	Eugenia Lazcano	Recurring role (season 3); 11 episodes
2014	Dos Lunas	Rénee Fàbregas	Main role; 13 episodes
2014–2016	Sr. Ávila	Erika Duarte	Recurring role (seasons 2–3); 13 episodes
2016	El hotel de los secretos	Belén García	Main role; 65 episodes
2016	Le Bureau des Légendes	Toufek Boumaza	1 episode
2017	Maldita tentación	Bibiana	
2017	Las 13 esposas de Wilson Fernández	Paulina	Episode: "Paulina"
2018	Run Coyote Run	Lucía	Episode: "Tráfico de delfines"
2019	Crime Diaries: The Candidate	Diana Laura Riojas de Colosio	Main role; 8 episodes
2020	100 días para enamorarnos	Constanza Franco	Main role
