= Alamar (film) =

2009 documentary film

- Promotional release poster
- Directed by: Pedro González-Rubio
- Written by: Pedro González-Rubio
- Produced by: Pedro González-Rubio; Jaime Romandía
- Starring: Jorge Machado
- Cinematography: Pedro González-Rubio
- Music by: Diego Benlliure
- Production company: Mantarraya Productions
- Distributed by: MK2
- Release date: 2009 (Morelia International Film Festival)
- Running time: 73 minutes
- Country: Mexico
- Language: Spanish

Alamar (To the Sea) is a 2009 Mexican docudrama film written, co-produced, filmed, and directed by Pedro González-Rubio. It is about a boy visiting his father in Banco Chinchorro. The film won best picture and the audience award at the 7th Morelia International Film Festival.

== Content of the film ==
The film is set in the coral reef of Banco Chinchorro, listed as a "biosphere reserve" by UNESCO on February 2, 2004. Nathan, a 5-year-old urban boy, finds his father Jorge, a Mexican fisherman, during the holidays. They go fishing together; a bond between the father and his son is renewed, driven by the beauty of nature.

Between fiction and documentary, it is an initiatory experience for the small child and contemplative for the viewer.

== Cast ==
- Jorge Machado Jorge
- Natan Machado Palombini Natan
- Roberta Palombini Roberta
- Nestor Marin Matraca

== Accolades ==
Award	Date	Category	Recipient	Result	Ref.
Morelia International Film Festival	10 October 2009	Best Mexican Film Award	Alamar	Won	
Rotterdam International Film Festival	6 February 2010	Golden Tiger	Alamar	Won	
