= Güeros =

- Directed by: Alonso Ruizpalacios
- Written by: Alonso Ruizpalacios
- Starring: Tenoch Huerta Mejía; Sebastián Aguirre
- Cinematography: Damián García
- Music by: Tomás Barreiro
- Release date: 7 February 2014 (Berlinale)
- Running time: 106 minutes
- Country: Mexico
- Language: Spanish

Güeros is a 2014 Mexican road comedy-drama film written and directed by Alonso Ruizpalacios. Set in Mexico City in 1999, the film tells the story of three restless teenagers searching for a folk-rocker during the Mexican capital's student strike. The film won five Ariel Awards, including Best Picture in 2015.

== Plot ==
In 1999, Tomás, a teenager from Veracruz, is sent to live with his brother Sombra in Mexico City after an incident with water balloons. Sombra lives with Santos, a fellow student, because of the CGH strike. They spend their time in their apartment in Copilco doing nothing, without money and with little food, they drink alcohol, smoke tobacco and steal electricity from the neighbor downstairs.

They learn that their father's musical idol, Epigmenio Cruz, who according to legend "once made Bob Dylan cry" is in a hospital on the verge of death. The brothers and Santos embark on a journey to get Epigmenio to sign a cassette that once belonged to their father.

During this trip, and out of curiosity of the brother, they enter the occupied facilities of Ciudad Universitaria, and there they meet Ana, a university leader, who shows them the life of the student strike and joins the trip after listening to Epigmenio's unusual music.

The group attends a private party for students of the National School of Cinematographic Arts, who live in their bubble isolated from the world. At the Chapultepec Zoo, the group meets Isabel, Epigmenio's ex-partner, who tells them a story of a bisexual threesome between her, Epigmenio, and another musician during the Avándaro Festival.

They finally find Epigmenio in a bar in Texcoco, who has become a hermit who rejects the group. Sombra gives him a speech about the importance of his music for him, his brother, and his family. At the end of the speech, Tomas discovers that Epigmenio has fallen asleep.

During the return trip, Sombra and Ana confess their feelings to each other in a silent scene. The group finds themselves in the middle of a massive CGH demonstration. Ana joins the demonstration and Sombra follows her. Tomas takes a photo of his brother while he smiles at the camera.

== Reception ==
On review aggregator Rotten Tomatoes, the film holds an approval rating of 92% based on 52 reviews, with an average rating of 7.54/10. The website's critics consensus reads: "A striking effort that synthesizes disparate influences with inventive flair, Güeros marks a bold step forward for modern Mexican cinema."

== Cast ==
- Tenoch Huerta Mejía - Sombra
- Sebastián Aguirre - Tomás
- Ilse Salas - Ana
- Leonardo Ortizgris - Santos

== Awards and nominations ==
=== Ariel Awards ===
The Ariel Awards are awarded annually by the Mexican Academy of Film Arts and Sciences in Mexico. Güeros won five awards out of 12 nominations.

Year	Nominee / work	Award	Result
2015	Güeros	Best Picture	Won
2015	Alonso Ruizpalacios	Best Director	Won
2015	Alonso Ruizpalacios	Best First Feature Film	Won
2015	Alonso Ruizpalacios	Best Original Screenplay	Nominated
2015	Ilse Salas	Best Actress	Nominated
2015	Tenoch Huerta	Best Actor	Nominated
2015	Sebastián Aguirre	Breakthrough Male Performance	Nominated
2015	Tomás Barreiro	Best Score	Nominated
2015	Isabel Muñoz, Pedro González, Gabriel Teyna, and Kyoshi Osawa	Best Sound	Won
2015	Yibrán Asuad and Ana García	Best Film Editing	Nominated
2015	Sandra Cabriada	Best Art Direction	Nominated
2015	Damián García	Best Cinematography	Won

=== Other Awards ===
- Tribeca Film Festival, Best Cinematography
- Internationale Berliner Filmfestspiele, Best First Feature Film
- AFI, Special Jury Mention for Screenwriting
