= Total Loss (2024 film) =

- Theatrical release poster
- Directed by: Enrique Begné
- Written by: Ernesto Anaya; Enrique Begné
- Produced by: Enrique Begné; Mónica Lozano; Alejandro Safa; Pato Safa
- Starring: Leonardo Ortizgris
- Cinematography: Federico Barbabosa
- Edited by: Macarena Hernández Abreu
- Music by: Ardalan Payvar; Joan Valent
- Production companies: Terregal Films; Dos abrazos Óxido; Groovy Chaos
- Release dates: October 22, 2024 (FICM); March 27, 2025 (Mexico)
- Running time: 100 minutes
- Country: Mexico
- Language: Spanish

Total Loss (Spanish: Pérdida total) is a 2024 Mexican black tragicomedy film co-written, co-produced and directed by Enrique Begné. It stars Leonardo Ortizgris as Claudio, a con man who becomes entangled with a powerful mafia boss when he tries to collect the insurance on his truck.

== Synopsis ==
Claudio is a con man, an absent father, and a compulsive liar who thinks he can abandon his truck on the highway and claim it as a total loss from the insurance company. However, when the body of a drug dealer's son is found in the same area, Claudio becomes bait to catch the criminal.

== Cast ==
- Leonardo Ortizgris as Claudio Gómez Restrepo
- Hector Kotsifakis as Rojo
- Jorge A. Jimenez as Coyote
- Joaquín Cosio as Bonilla
- Alejandro Calva as Arturo
- Tato Alexander as Tere
- Ana Sofia Gatica as Vanessa
- Enrique Arreola as Toño
- Paulo Galindo as Buho
- Rodrigo Oviedo as Norte
- Randy Vasquez as Paul Stain
- Sheila Flores as Zambrano's wife
- Oliver Cantú Lozano as Police
- Julieta Chichino as Xime
- Ana Sofía Muñoz Polendo as Elvira

== Production ==
Principal photography began on September 26, 2022, in Torreón, Mexico, lasting 25 days.

== Release ==
The film had its world premiere on October 22, 2024, at the 22nd Morelia International Film Festival, then was commercially released on March 27, 2025, in Mexican theaters.
