= Un buen divorcio =

- Genre: Romantic comedy
- Created by: Billy Rovzar
- Showrunner: Billy Rovzar
- Directed by: Alfonso Pineda Ulloa
- Starring: Claudia Álvarez; Gustavo Egelhaaf; Rafael Sánchez Navarro; Esmeralda Pimentel
- Country of origin: Mexico
- Original language: Spanish
- No. of seasons: 1
- No. of episodes: 10

Production
- Executive producers: Billy Rovzar; Erica Sánchez Su
- Producers: Fernando Rovzar; Alejandro Lozano
- Production company: Lemon Studios

Original release
- Network: Vix
- Release: 1 March 2024

Un buen divorcio is a Mexican romantic comedy drama streaming television series created by Billy Rovzar. The series stars Claudia Álvarez, Gustavo Egelhaaf, and Esmeralda Pimentel. It premiered on Vix on 1 March 2024.

== Plot ==
The series follows Mónica and David, divorce lawyers who will try anything to save their marriage. Mónica turns to a couples therapist named Jessica, whom David had an affair with the night before. With no choice but to attend therapy, David starts to live a lie he finds hard to keep, while Mónica struggles to keep her own demons at bay, all while keeping her company, her clients and their relationship under control for their two sons, Diego and Gael.

== Cast ==
=== Main ===
- Claudia Álvarez as Mónica Rionda
- Gustavo Egelhaaf as David Ortiz
- Rafael Sánchez Navarro as Rogelio Rionda
- Esmeralda Pimentel as Jessica Ramos

=== Recurring ===
- Anabel Ferreira as Rosita
- Adrián Vázquez as Emiliano
- Edmundo Velarde as Gael
- Erick Velarde as Diego
- Valeria Santaella as Gaby
- Arath Aquino as Travis
- Gonzalo García Vivanco as Carlos
- Artús Chavéz as Ricardo
- Carmen Beato as Cinthia
- Jeronimo Best as Jorge

=== Guest stars ===
- Marypaz Aparicio as Margarita
- Daniel Haddad as Samuel
- Úrsula Pruneda as Clara
- Samantha Coronel as Pamela
- Daniel Chávez Camacho as Bruno
- Diego Jauregui as Judge Enriquez
- Benilde Montero as Begoña
- Alejandro Prieto as Benny
- Ari Placera as Zion
- Luis Arrieta as Fernando
- Adriana Montes de Oca as Brenda
- Sergio Carazo Cardona as Pico
- Alicia Camps as Sandra
- Fernando Memije as Professor Bejarano
- Cristian Magaloni as Juan Pablo
- Tamara Vallarta as Natalia
- Santino Arévalo as Ismael
- Fabricio Mercado as Pierre
- Pilar Ixquic Mata as Teresa
- Luciana González as Inés
- Victoria Guerrero as Romina
- Raquel Bustos as Amelia
- Alma Rosa Añorve as Cloe

== Production ==
=== Development ===
The series was announced in November 2022. In March 2023, it was announced that production of the series had begun. The series premiered on 1 March 2024.

=== Casting ===
On 30 March 2023, Claudia Álvarez, Gustavo Egelhaaf, and Esmeralda Pimentel were announced in the lead roles.

== Episodes ==
| No. | Title | Written by | Original release date |
|---|---|---|---|
| 1 | "La albóndiga" | Billy Rovzar | 1 March 2024 |
| 2 | "Juego de niños" | Billy Rovzar & Andreu Castro | 1 March 2024 |
| 3 | "Baila conmigo" | Andreu Castro | 1 March 2024 |
| 4 | "Hablando se excita la gente" | Alejandra Rodríguez | 1 March 2024 |
| 5 | "Fuera de servicio" | Alejandra Rodríguez | 1 March 2024 |
| 6 | "Panamá" | Alejandra Rodríguez | 1 March 2024 |
| 7 | "De las cenizas" | Pato Portillo | 1 March 2024 |
| 8 | "Baja el telón" | Lisa Carrion | 1 March 2024 |
| 9 | "La venganza es ciega" | Billy Rovzar | 1 March 2024 |
| 10 | "Una oferta que no puedes rechazar" | Andreu Castro | 1 March 2024 |
