= Mutiny of the Worker Bees =

2020 Mexican comedy drama film directed by Carlos Morett

- Film poster
- Spanish: Rebelión de los Godínez
- Directed by: Carlos Morett
- Written by: Carlos Morett; Omar M. Albores
- Starring: Gustavo Egelhaaf; Alejandro Suárez; Bárbara de Regil
- Distributed by: Netflix
- Release date: 28 February 2020
- Running time: 93 minutes
- Country: Mexico
- Language: Spanish

Mutiny of the Worker Bees (Spanish: Rebelión de los Godínez) is a 2020 Mexican comedy film written and directed by Carlos Morett. The film stars Gustavo Egelhaaf, Alejandro Suárez and Bárbara de Regil in the lead roles. The film was released on 28 February 2020 and received poor reviews from critics. It was also streamed via Netflix on 20 May 2020.

== Synopsis ==
Omar (Gustavo Egelhaaf) is forced to obtain a job to earn a living in a tech company at Mexico City after his grandpa Abuelo (Alejandro Suárez) gets heart attack and Omar is in need to finance his grandpa's health, but Omar meets a quirky ensemble a nine to five job.

== Cast ==
- Gustavo Egelhaaf as Omar Buendía
- Alejandro Suárez as Abuelo
- Bárbara de Regil as Tonia Davich
- Mauricio Argüelles as Roberto Davich
- Cesar Rodriguez as Hugo Chances
- Fernando Becerril as Braulio
- José Sefami as Xavier Delgado
