= Gustavo Egelhaaf =

Mexican actor

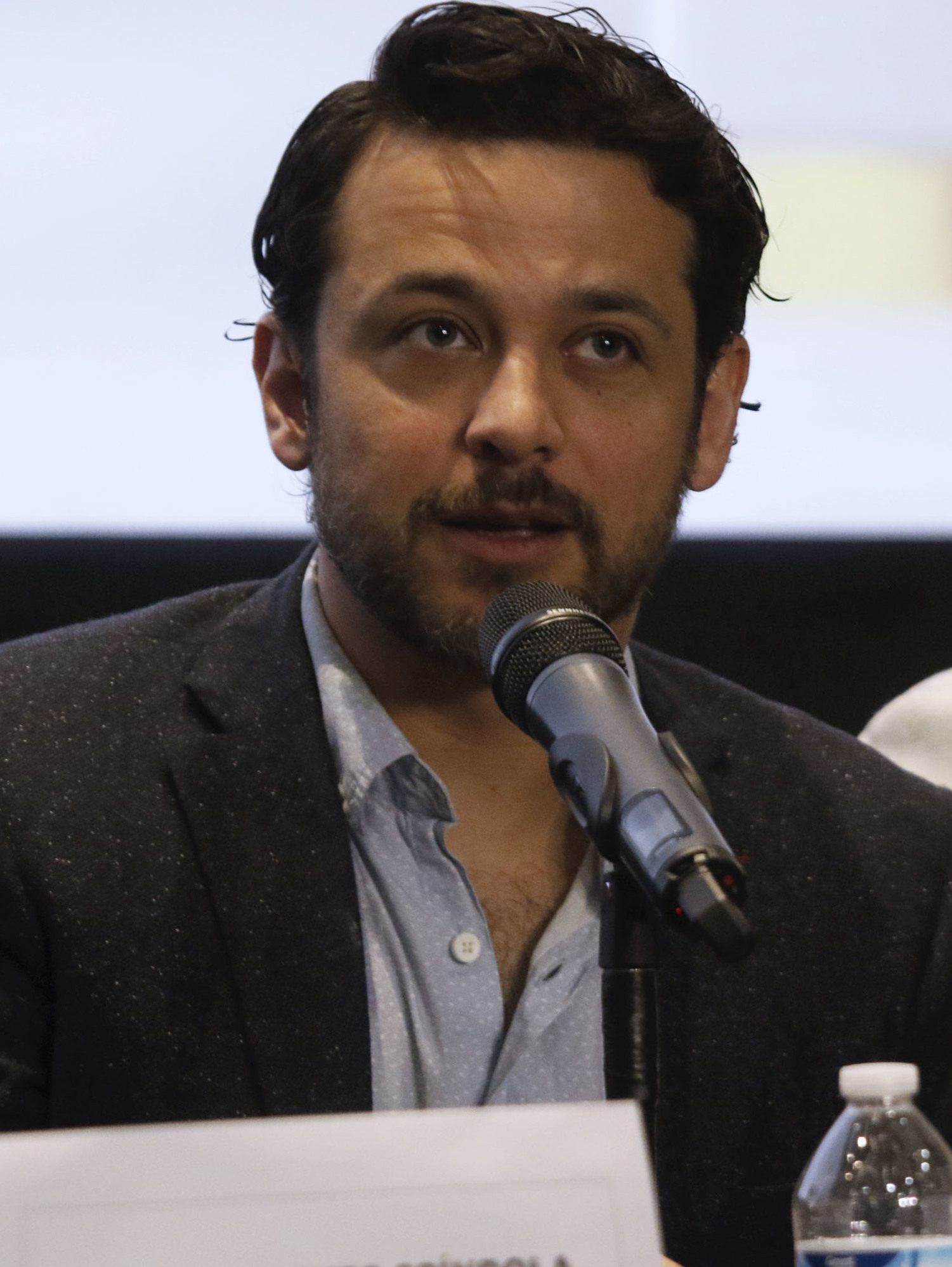
- Egelhaaf in 2019
- Born: 30 June 1983 (age 41); Hermosillo, Sonora
- Occupation: Actor
- Years active: 2008–present

Gustavo Egelhaaf (born 30 June 1983) is a Mexican actor known in his native country for his film roles. On television he has had notable roles in series such as El Vato (2016–2017), and El Chema (2016–2017). Despite having started having recurring roles in films, his first major role was in 2018, in the film Hasta que la boda nos separe, alongside Diana Bovio, and recently in Doblemente embarazada, alongside Maite Perroni.

== Filmography ==
Film roles
Year	Title	Roles	Notes
2008	Philia	Pablo	Short film
2009	La despedida de Eugenio	Fernando / Eugenio	Short film
2012	Amante de lo ajeno	Felipe anterior	
2014	Four Moons	Leo	
2014	Perfect Obedience	Francisco Romero	
2018	Hasta que la boda nos separe	Daniel	
2019	Doblemente embarazada	Javier	
2020	Rebelión de Los Godínez	Omar Buendía	

Television roles
Year	Title	Roles	Notes
2016–2017	El Vato	El Pollo	23 episodes
2016	Perseguidos		6 episodes
2016–2017	El Chema	Saúl Clark	Series regular; 74 episodes
2017	Maldita tentación	Roberto	
2018	El secreto de Selena	Alex	11 episodes
2024	Un buen divorcio	David	
