= Maldita tentación =

- Screenplay by: Liliana Guzmán; Catalina Palomino
- Story by: Mauricio Navas; Mauricio Miranda
- Directed by: Santiago Vargas
- Creative director: Sofía Morales
- Starring: Valentino Lanús; Ana Layevska; Ilse Salas
- Countries of origin: Mexico; Colombia
- Original language: Spanish
- No. of seasons: 1
- No. of episodes: 45

Production
- Editor: Silvia Ayala
- Production companies: RCN Televisión; EstudiosTeleMéxico

Original release
- Network: Estrella TV
- Release: August 7, 2017

Maldita tentación is a psychological thriller television series premiered on American television cable Estrella TV on August 7, 2017.

It was adapted by Liliana Guzmán and Catalina Palomino and based on an original idea by Mauricio Navas and Mauricio Miranda. Directed by Santiago Vargas, the series is produced by RCN Televisión in collaboration with EstudiosTeleMéxico.

The debut was planned by MundoFox (later renamed to MundoMax). It was later canceled for unknown reasons.

It stars Valentino Lanús as Fernando Bonilla, an engineer with a beautiful family, along with Ana Layevska as Estefanía Braun, and Ilse Salas as Bibiana.

== Plot ==
Engineer Fernando Bonilla (Valentino Lanús) lives the most intense weekend of his life in the company of Estefanía Braun (Ana Layevska), a woman too beautiful and intelligent to be true. What began as a chance encounter on a random Saturday between the aisles of a supermarket ends in an unbridled encounter of passion that consumes them both until dawn the next day. Fernando is not a man of infidelity or secrecy, but this one sin seems to be behind during the breakfast conversation between them, which makes it clear that what happened is nothing more than an escape from life and that everything has to return to normal.

Fernando returns to his family life, without imagining that from this moment Estefanía will spend every minute to follow him, to harass him with calls and appearances that become overwhelming. Desperate to end the harassment and the intrusion of the woman, Fernando attempts to have an intense discussion to persuade the woman to stop contacting him. The next day, he awakes in horrific circumstances as he is lying in a pool of blood and Estefanía is dead by his side. At the end of the day, Fernando's conscience is as dirty as his hands, but he finds some comfort with the idea of having saved his family. However, far from ending the nightmare, Matilde, his 6-year-old daughter, brings her father a letter that just came under the door.

Fernando opens the envelope and inside there is a note that says "I did not like what you did with my corpse. Today at six o'clock in the afternoon on the map. Do not even dare miss." That afternoon, Fernando lies to Bibiana (Ilse Salas), his wife, for the first time in his life, so he can escape from his house and go to the meeting point indicated in the letter. At six in the afternoon has arrived at a dark room where suddenly a projector lights and like blades of a guillotine appears in the screen a video that relates in sequence the homicide committed by Fernando the previous night. Terrified, he cannot take his eyes off of the projection. Fernando then sees the woman, Estafanía. She surprises him with her presence and he is very fearful, at which point she says "Is this the first time you have seen a person rise from the dead?"

From that moment the life of Fernando is taken over by the fear. Estefanía issues tasks of revenge that she has been planning for years after a trauma of childhood. Mysteriously, however, Fernando is the protagonist.

== Cast ==
=== Main characters ===
- Valentino Lanús as Fernando Bonilla, a consecrated engineer who is married to Bibiana.
- Ana Layevska as Estefanía Braun and Katerine, Estefanía a beautiful and intelligent woman who is obsessed with her Fernando. Katerine is the twin sister of Estefanía, she is a noble and good woman who lives her world on the other hand away from her sister.
- Ilse Salas as Bibiana
- Francisco Rubio as Ángel
- Siouzana Melikián as Karina
- Fernando Gaviria as Juan Nieto
- Gustavo Egelhaaf as Roberto
- Maritza Rodríguez as Lizeth
- Mayra Rojas as María
- Julieta Grajales as Violeta

=== Recurring characters ===
- Mario Loría as Andrés Arango
- Marcela Ruiz Esparza as Camila
- Roberto Montiel as Saúl Valero
- Ana Paula de León as Matilde
- Norma Del Mar as Rosa
- Marco de la O as Gonzalo
