= Museum (2018 film) =

2018 film

- Film poster
- Directed by: Alonso Ruizpalacios
- Written by: Manuel Alcalá; Alonso Ruizpalacios
- Produced by: Manuel Alcalá; Ramiro Ruiz; Gerardo Gatica; Alonso Ruizpalacios
- Starring: Gael García Bernal; Leonardo Ortizgris
- Cinematography: Damián García
- Edited by: Yibrán Asuad
- Music by: Tomás Barreiro
- Distributed by: YouTube Originals; Cinépolis Distribución
- Release dates: 22 February 2018 (Berlin); 23 August 2018 (Mexico)
- Running time: 128 minutes
- Country: Mexico
- Language: Spanish

Museum (Spanish: Museo) is a 2018 Mexican drama heist film directed by Alonso Ruizpalacios, and produced and written by Ruizpalacios and Manuel Alcalá. It's based on the true story of the 1985 Christmas Eve robbery of the National Museum of Anthropology in Mexico City and follows two veterinary students, Juan Núñez (Gael García Bernal) and Benjamín Wilson (Leonardo Ortizgris), as they commit the heist, stealing precious Mayan, Mixtec, and Zapotec artifacts, and its aftermath. It was selected to compete for the Golden Bear in the main competition section at the 68th Berlin International Film Festival where it won the Silver Bear for Best Screenplay.

== Plot ==
The film opens with a flashback of five-year-old Juan Núñez visiting the Tlaloc monolith at the National Museum of Anthropology in Mexico City, which his father told him was taken from its original home in San Miguel Coatlinchán. In present day, we see an adult Juan (Gael García Bernal) and his friend Benjamín Wilson (Leonardo Ortizgris), who are both veterinary students. Juan lives with his family and is preparing for Christmas by being fitted in his deceased uncle's Santa suit. He also is seen buying various tools and chemicals.

Juan hears about planned renovations on the National Museum of Anthropology on the news and calls Benjamin to explain their plan must take place that night, Christmas Eve, 1985. Benjamin, who is taking care of his ill father, explains that he wants to spend the night with his dad, since it may be there last Christmas together. Juan insists.

Juan spends the first part of Christmas Eve with his family, appearing to have a strained relationship with them. He causes a fallout by exposing the hidden Christmas presents to one of the young relatives and insinuating that Santa doesn't exist. He then leaves to pick up Benjamin.

The two friends then break into the National Museum of Anthropology, stealing 140 priceless Mayan, Mixtec, and Zapotec artifacts. They are almost caught by guards, but manage to escape through the ventilation system.

They return home to see on the news how their deed is described as an attack on the entire nation. Benjamin suggests returning the artifacts, but they decide to move forward with finding a buyer for them. On the way to Palenque, they get pulled over by cops, but they don't recognize the artifacts, and are let go. In Palenque, they connect with a local tour guide named Bosco (Bernardo Velasco), who they think can help them.

Bosco is unwilling to help at first, but eventually relents and offers to connect them with a rich British collector named Mr. Graves (Simon Russell Beale). The three of them meet Mr. Graves in Acapulco and try to sell the pieces for one million dollars. After seeing the artifacts, Mr. Graves calls out Juan and Benjamin as amateurs and refuses to buy the pieces, deeming them unsellable. They leave, and Juan and Benjamin have a big fight in the car. Benjamin leaves on foot.

Juan then goes alone to look for another fence named Pepe Soto. He goes to a bar that is supposed to be owned by Soto called Heaven's Gates where he recognizes one of the dancers, Eugenia, also known as Scherezada, a former film star. He then gets in a fight defending her from some rowdy bar patrons and learns from her that Pepe Soto is dead. He spends the evening drinking, partying, and doing drugs with Eugenia, waking up on a beach, hungover and alone.

He leaves and reunites with Benjamin, who is watching cliff divers from a restaurant balcony. We learn that Benjamin's father died, and the two of them appear to make up. We then see Juan returning home to pick up some sentimental items and say goodbye to his parents. He confesses to the crime to them. His parents are devastated, but his father then takes him and Benjamin back to the museum to return the artifacts.

Benjamin leaves two bags, presumably with the artifacts, in the coat check. Juan, separates from Benjamin to place one of the artifacts, the jade mask of Pakal, on its case. Because of this, he is spotted by a guard and apprehended. Benjamin appears to get away.

== Cast ==
- Gael García Bernal as Juan Núñez
- Leonardo Ortizgris as Benjamin Wilson
- Simon Russell Beale as Frank Graves
- Lynn Gilmartin as Gemma
- Alfredo Castro as Dr. Núñez
- Leticia Brédice as Sherezada

== Reception ==
On the review aggregator website Rotten Tomatoes, 87% of 60 critics' reviews are positive, with an average rating of 7.5/10. The website's consensus reads: "Museum (Museo) approaches familiar genre territory from a refreshing new perspective that's as exciting visually as it is narratively." Metacritic, which uses a weighted average, assigned the film a score of 86 out of 100, based on 14 critics, indicating "universal acclaim".
