= Carmin Tropical =

2014 film

- Promotional release poster
- Directed by: Rigoberto Pérezcano
- Written by: Rigoberto Pérezcano
- Starring: José Pecina
- Production companies: Tiburón Filmes; Instituto Mexicano de Cinematografía
- Distributed by: Piano
- Release dates: 23 October 2014 (Morelia IFF); 9 October 2015 (Mexico)
- Running time: 80 minutes
- Country: Mexico
- Language: Spanish

Carmin Tropical is a 2014 Mexican independent thriller drama film directed by Rigoberto Pérezcano. The film was named on the shortlist for Mexico's entry for the Academy Award for Best Foreign Language Film at the 89th Academy Awards, but it was not selected.

== Plot ==
Mabel, a muxe who lives in Veracruz, returns to her hometown in Oaxaca to find the murderer of her friend Daniela. During her trip she meets Modesto, a cab driver who reminds her of the time when she was one of the most recognized cabaret singers in the community, which she gave up to go in search of a man's love.

== Cast ==
- José Pecina as Mabel
- Luis Alberti as Modesto
- Everardo Trejo as Faraón Morales
- Juan Carlos Medellin as Darina
