= Kristyan Ferrer =

Mexican actor (born 1995)

- Born: Kristyan Antonio Ferrer Medel; 14 February 1995 (age 31); Mexico City, Distrito Federal, Mexico
- Other name: Kristian Ferrer
- Occupation: Actor

Kristyan Ferrer (born Kristyan Antonio Ferrer Medel; 14 February 1995) is a Mexican actor in various roles since 2001. He played the role of El Smiley in the award-winning film Sin Nombre, directed by US director Cary Joji Fukunaga. For his lead roles in the films Guten Tag, Ramón (2014) and 600 Millas (2015), Ferrer won the Ariel Award for Best Supporting Actor for this role in The Black Minutes in 2022.

== Early life and career ==
Is Ferrer has studied acting, song, dance, and guitar and worked under contract with TV Azteca playing many roles, most notably Lo que callamos las mujeres, in Puro loco, Qué buena onda, Ya cayó and in the telefilm Milagros, the latter in the lead role. He has also done several television commercials in Mexico and the United States. He has also performed in stage plays, such as Beto al Rescate del Tiempo (in the title role of Beto) and appears in Nick Lyon’s Species: The Awakening (2007) as a Mexican boy. He is scheduled to appear in Icelandic director Baltasar Kormákur's upcoming film Inhale. Recently Ferrer appeared in Luis Estrada's film El Infierno (2010) as "El Sobrino" or "El Diablito".

== Role in Sin Nombre ==
In 2009, he landed a major role in Cary Joji Fukunaga's 2009 movie Sin Nombre, where he plays the role of El Smiley, a young adolescent introduced into the Mara Salvatrucha gang by El Casper (played by Edgar Flores). Having witnessed the murder of gang leader Lil' Mago (played by Tenoch Huerta Mejía) in the hands of his friend El Casper, he requests the brutal task of murdering El Casper in revenge.

Chicago Sun-Times critic Roger Ebert noted on the role played by Ferrer: "Smiley, so young, with a winning smile, is perhaps the most frightening character, because he demonstrates how powerful an effect, even hypnotic, gang culture can have on unshielded kids.". The Daily Californian on the other hand says "Kristyan Ferrer as little Smiley, a new gang member, is adorable and devastating. His character illuminates a plain truth: Even younger generations will not be unscathed by violence."

Interviewed about his role, Ferrer says: "To play Smiley, I had to learn some of the signs, [jomi] of the Mara Salvatrucha, and how they speak and move and walk. Cary Joji Fukunaga helped with all that, because he did more research than I did – he visited the Mara. He told us about their tattoos and had us watch a documentary about the Mara... To perpetuate the Mara, children are important. Smiley thinks that by entering the Mara he’ll be able to do what he pleases. He is a young boy who wants to seem older. Smiley is a regular kid, and you don’t believe that he will do what he does. But he will, he has to, to survive – like anyone in the Mara... My most difficult scene was when Smiley has to cry; he’s sad because he’s been hit and kicked, but he’s happy because he belongs to the Mara. So he’s feeling pain and happiness at the same time. Cary helped me make the character real and to control my emotions while performing. Playing Smiley, I had to become aggressive; he was another part of me that I thought didn’t exist."

== Filmography ==
=== Film ===
Year	Title	Role
2026	Surviving Hurricane Otis	Candi
