= H2Omx =

- Theatrical release poster
- Directed by: José Cohen; Lorenzo Hagerman
- Written by: Olga Caceres; Adán Lerma; Alejandra Liceaga; Ylva Mossing
- Produced by: José Cohen; Alejandra Liceaga
- Cinematography: Bernabé Salinas; Guillermo Rosas; Jaime Reynoso; Sylvestre Guidi; Lorenzo Hagerman; Gaetan Mariage
- Edited by: Paula Heredia; Omar Guzmán; Lorenzo Hagerman.
- Music by: Ariel Guzik
- Production companies: Cactus Film and Video
- Release dates: October 2013 (FICM); August 28, 2014 (Mexico)
- Running time: 90 minutes
- Country: Mexico
- Language: Spanish

H2Omx is a 2013 Mexican documentary film directed by José Cohen (in his directorial debut) and Lorenzo Hagerman. Based on a script written by Olga Caceres, Adán Lerma, Alejandra Liceaga & Ylva Mossing. It tells of the shortage, waste, and serious water pollution problems in Mexico City.

== Synopsis ==
Can a region of 22 million inhabitants make its water management sustainable? Based on a case study from the Valley of Mexico, the film inquires into the problem of water pollution in Mexico, and that despite the fact that Mexico City was founded on a lake, outside help is needed to fill it.

== Release ==
H2Omx had its international premiere in October 2013 at the 11th Morelia International Film Festival. It was commercially released on August 28, 2014, in Mexican theaters.

== Reception ==
=== Critical reception ===
Alisa Simon from Variety wrote : "A rallying cry for government and collective action, H2Omx is a good-looking, well-researched and smartly assembled documentary that makes a persuasive case that the time is nigh to remedy the status of water management in the Valley of Mexico." Josue Corro from Time Out México wrote: "H2Omx does not try to find solutions, but to raise awareness about the future. The honest way of dealing with a problem –without political charges, or sensationalism– places this documentary as a work that goes beyond the genetics of school or television documentaries, and projects it as an informative and relevant film on the history of Mexico City."

=== Accolades ===
Year	Award	Category	Recipient	Result	Ref.
2014	Margaret Mead Film & Video Festival	Margaret Mead Award	José Cohen & Lorenzo Hagerman	Won	
2014	Hamburg Film Festival	Political Film Award	José Cohen & Lorenzo Hagerman	Nominated	
2015	Ariel Award	Best Feature Documentary	José Cohen & Lorenzo Hagerman	Won	
