= Héctor Jiménez =

Mexican actor and producer (born 1973)

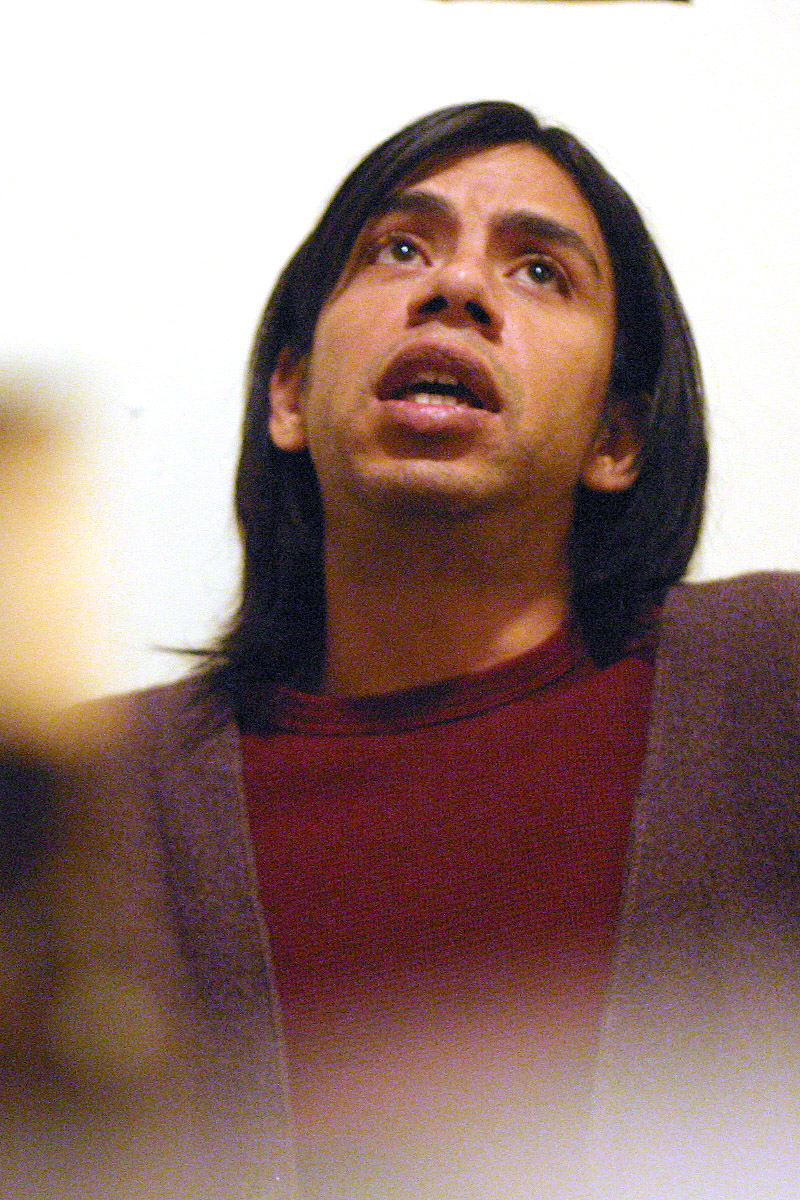
- Jimenez in December 2006
- Born: December 13, 1973 (age 52); Tijuana, Baja California, Mexico
- Occupations: Actor, producer
- Years active: 1992–present

Héctor Jiménez Gudiño (born December 13, 1973) is a Mexican actor and producer. He played Esqueleto in Nacho Libre, Mr. Tumnus in Epic Movie and the cashier in Wild Hogs. He worked in a theater company in Tijuana for eight years, before moving to Mexico City to work for a Swiss company as a theater clown. In 2007, he was nominated in the MTV Movie Awards for Best Fight Scene. He is known in Hollywood circles as "The Mexican Steve Buscemi". On August 23, 2007, Jiménez appeared in the episode of the pre-schooler's show Yo Gabba Gabba! on Nick Jr. for the recurring Dancey Dance segment.

== Filmography ==
- Arachnaconda (in development) as Deputy Hector
- Camino Adentro (in development)
- Happy Fists Claudia (in development) as Hector
- Un hombre de la calle (2025) as Eduardo
- El amor no es para siempre (2025) as Rodrigo
- Prison Cell 211 (2025) as Armando Carrizales
- Wingwalker (2024) as El Hongos
- Mamá Cake (2024) as Hans / Alfonso
- The Honest Candidate (2024) as Raúl Gómez
- Un mexicano en la luna (2024)
- Thelma the Unicorn (2024) as Esteban (voice)
- Tequila Re-Pasado (2023) as Max
- Welcome Al Norte (2023) Zarigueya
- The Great Seduction (2023) as Jorge
- The Black Demon (2023) as Chocolatito
- Incomplete Lovers (2022) as Joaquín
- Who Killed Sara? (2021) as Elroy (TV series)
- Ruta Madre (2019)
- Justice for All (2018)
- Compadres (2016) as Guasa
- Fachon Models (2014) as El Charal
- Suave Patria (2012)
- El Santos vs. La Tetona Mendoza (2012) as Cabo Valdivia
- Casa de Mi Padre (2012)
- El Albergue (2012) as Bulgaro Antonio (TV series)
- Cellmates (2011) as Emilio
- Sharktopus (2010) as Bones
- El infierno (2010) as Pancho Pistolas
- Gentlemen Broncos (2009) as Lonnie
- Sin Nombre (2009) as Leche/Wounded Man
- Navidad SA (2008) as Chícharo
- Killer Pad (2007) as Angel
- Yo Gabba Gabba! (2007) as Himself
- Wild Hogs (2007) As Store Clerk
- Epic Movie (2007) as Mr. Tumnus/Tony Fauntana
- La Ventana de Luciano
- Nacho Libre (2006) as Steven/Esqueleto
- Punto de fuga (2006) as Héctor
- Voces inocentes (2004) as Raton
- Mezcal (2004) as Borracho joven
- Supervivencia (1992)
