= La fórmula del doctor Funes =

- Theatrical film poster
- Directed by: José Buil
- Starring: Martín Altomaro; Giovanna Zacarías; Emanuel Latanzio; Daniel Carrera; Patricio Castillo
- Music by: Eduardo Gamboa
- Release date: 6 November 2015
- Running time: 82 minutes
- Country: Mexico
- Language: Spanish

La fórmula del doctor Funes (translated English as Dr. Funes' formula) is a 2015 Mexican science fiction comedy film directed by José Buil about a boy making friend with a rejuvenated scientist who goes around using youth serum on others people as prank or retribution. It won the 2016 Best Family film award in the San Diego Latino Film Festival.

== Plot ==
It is an adaptation of a novel by Francisco Hinojosa which tell the story of Dr. Funes, who discovers a formula to achieve eternal youth, and upon testing it on himself becomes a 12-year-old before embarking on new adventures with his friend Martín Poyo.

== Cast ==
- Martín Altomaro as Papá Poyo
- Giovanna Zacarías as Mamá Poyo
- Emanuel Latanzio as Martín Poyo
- Daniel Carrera as Doctor Funes
- Patricio Castillo as Doctor Mohebius
- Paloma Arredondo as Enfermera Blanquita
- Poponshis Moreno as Juan Niño
