= The Obscure Spring =

- Directed by: Ernesto Contreras
- Written by: Carlos Contreras
- Produced by: Luis Albores; Erika Avila; Carlos Meza; Gustavo Angel Olaya; José María Yazpik
- Starring: Cecilia Suárez; Irene Azuela
- Cinematography: Tonatiuh Martínez Valdéz
- Music by: Emmanuel del Real; Ramiro del Real
- Release date: 21 October 2014
- Running time: 100 minutes
- Country: Mexico
- Language: Spanish

The Obscure Spring (Spanish: Las oscuras primaveras) is a 2014 Mexican erotic drama film directed by Ernesto Contreras.

== Cast ==
- Cecilia Suárez as Flora
- Irene Azuela as Pina 7

- José María Yazpik as Igor
- Flavio Medina as Sandro

== Reception ==
On review aggregator website Rotten Tomatoes the film has a score of 67% based on reviews from 6 critics, with an average rating of 7.5/10.
