= Édgar Flores (actor) =

Honduran actor

- Born: Edgar Mauricio Flores; Tegucigalpa, Honduras
- Occupation: Actor
- Years active: 2009–present

Edgar Flores is a Honduran actor born in Tegucigalpa, Honduras.

He starred in the Cary Joji Fukunaga movie Sin Nombre in the role of Willy, nicknamed El Casper, a Mara Salvatrucha gang member in Chiapas, Mexico.

He was picked through Terco Producciones, which was responsible for the Honduran casting of the lead role for Sin Nombre.

Edgar Flores had participated earlier in a Honduran national casting call for the miniseries Diferentes a Todos and was cast. The program was produced by Promega, directed by Francisco Andino, and produced by Francis Mejía.

He is currently working for Promega in Honduras and is studying at the same time.
