= Semana Santa (2015 film) =

2015 film

- Film poster
- Directed by: Alejandra Márquez Abella
- Written by: Alejandra Márquez Abella
- Starring: Anajosé Aldrete
- Release date: 11 September 2015 (TIFF)
- Running time: 85 minutes
- Country: Mexico
- Language: Spanish

Semana Santa is a 2015 Mexican drama film directed by Alejandra Márquez Abella. It was screened in the Discovery section of the 2015 Toronto International Film Festival.

== Cast ==
- Anajosé Aldrete as Dalí
- Tenoch Huerta as Chavez
- Esteban Avila as Pepe
- Jimena Cuarón as Calzón
