= Guten Tag, Ramón =

Buen día, Ramón
- Film poster
- Directed by: Jorge Ramírez Suárez
- Written by: Jorge Ramírez Suárez
- Produced by: Jorge Ramírez Suárez
- Starring: Kristyan Ferrer; Ingeborg Schöner; Hector Kotsifakis; Rüdiger Evers; Franziska Kruse; Karl Friedrich; Adriana Barraza; Arcelia Ramírez
- Cinematography: Carlos Hidalgo
- Edited by: Sam Baixauli; Sonia Sánchez Carrasco; Jorge Ramírez Suárez
- Music by: Rodrigo Flores López
- Distributed by: 20th Century Fox
- Release date: 21 October 2013
- Running time: 120 minutes
- Countries: Mexico; Germany
- Languages: Spanish; German

Guten Tag, Ramón is a 2013 Mexican-German drama film directed by Jorge Ramírez Suárez and starring Kristyan Ferrer.

== Plot ==
The story of a young Mexican man named Ramon who lives in a small village in Durango, México. Because of a lack of opportunities and the threats from the drug lords in his village, Ramón has tried to migrate to the USA five times without success. A friend tells him to go to Wiesbaden, Germany, where he has an aunt, who is married to a German man can offer work and help. Ramón follows his friend's advice, flying to Germany only to find that his friend's aunt is no longer living at that address. Ramón has to live on the streets, begging for money and food. He runs into some kind strangers eager to help.

An old woman in particular (Ruth) sees him around town and offers to take him in at her place and has him help with odd jobs at her apartment building. Despite the language barrier, the two become good friends and Ramon is generally welcomed by the neighbors, who enjoy his help and his dance lessons. One day Ramon goes missing, and unable to find him, Ruth discovers that he had been reported to the police and has been deported back to Mexico. Ramon is reunited with his family and friends, but longs for the warmth and kindness he received in Germany. A few days later, Ramon receives a call from Ruth who has decided to wire transfer him a large amount of money.

== Cast ==
- Kristyan Ferrer as Ramon
- Ingeborg Schöner as Ruth
- Adriana Barraza as Esperanza
- Arcelia Ramírez as Rosa
- Rüdiger Evers as Karl
- Hector Kotsifakis as Güero

== Reception ==
The film has a 100% rating on Rotten Tomatoes based on 6 reviews, with an average score of 7.6/10.

=== Critics in Germany ===
Guten Tag, Ramón was shown in multiple theaters, and was a box office success in the European country. The film was released on 5 February 2013, and was distributed in 52 German theaters. Generally, the screening of Mexican productions tends to be concentrated in one of the many film festivals that take place during the year, as Alia Lira Hartmann states: "At the Berlinale, one of the film meetings where any filmmaker wants to make his work known, the screening does not usually go beyond two presentations for a limited audience".
