= Ventana Sur =

Latin American film market

- Status: Active
- Genre: Film market
- Frequency: Annual
- Locations: Buenos Aires, Argentina; Montevideo, Uruguay
- Inaugurated: November 27, 2009; 16 years ago
- Most recent: December 1–5, 2025
- Participants: 255 buyers and distributors (2023)
- Attendance: 4,480 (2023)
- Organizer: Marché du Film; Film and Audiovisual Agency of Uruguay; National Institute of Cinema and Audiovisual Arts
- Website: www.ventana-sur.com/en/

Ventana Sur (Spanish: [benˈtana ˈsuɾ], lit. 'South Window') is a marketplace for Latin American film and television works and projects held annually in late November or early December. Inaugurated in 2009, it was organized jointly by Argentina's National Institute of Cinema and Audiovisual Arts (INCAA) and the Cannes Film Festival's Marché du Film and held in Buenos Aires, Argentina, for the first 15 editions. Since the 2024 16th edition, which was held in Montevideo, Uruguay, the Film and Audiovisual Agency of Uruguay (ACAU) has joined the organizers. The 2025 edition took place in Buenos Aires, and the 2026 edition is scheduled to take place in Montevideo.
