= Tenoch Huerta =

Mexican actor and activist (born 1981)

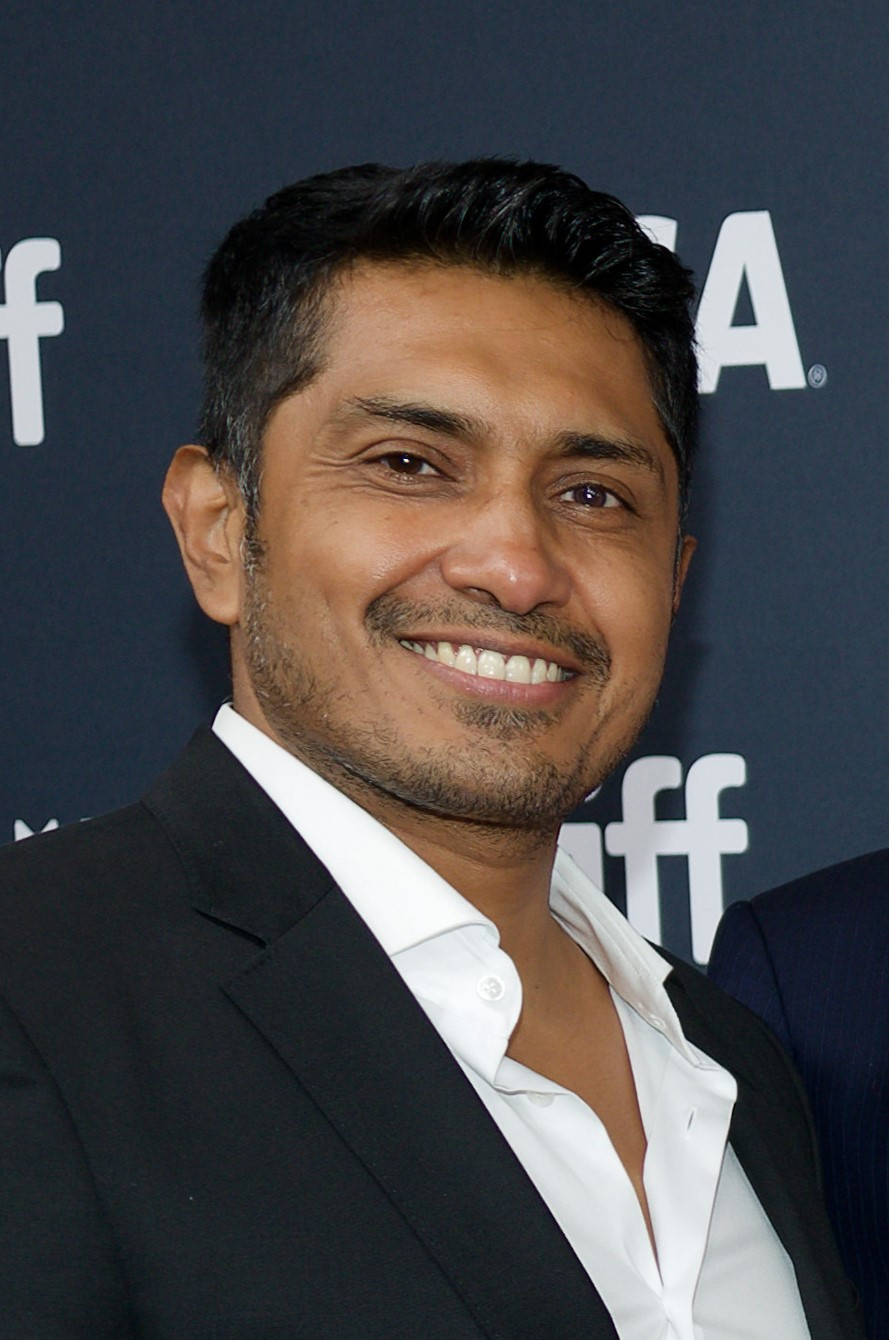
- Huerta in 2024
- Born: José Tenoch Huerta Mejía; January 29, 1981 (age 45); Ecatepec, State of Mexico, Mexico
- Other name: Tenoch Huerta Mejía
- Occupations: Actor; activist; writer
- Years active: 2006–present
- Notable work: Days of Grace; Güeros; Narcos: Mexico; The Forever Purge; Black Panther: Wakanda Forever; Avengers: Doomsday

José Tenoch Huerta Mejía (Spanish: [teˈnotʃ ˈweɾta]; born January 29, 1981) is a Mexican actor, writer, and activist. (Note: He has been credited as both Tenoch Huerta and Tenoch Huerta Mejía in his work.) He has appeared in a number of movies in Latin America and Spain, and has had a starring role in the crime drama Narcos: Mexico (2018–2020). He has since portrayed Namor in the Marvel Cinematic Universe (MCU) film Black Panther: Wakanda Forever (2022) and will reprise his role in the upcoming film Avengers: Doomsday (2026).

== Early life ==
Huerta was born in Ecatepec de Morelos, State of Mexico, on 29 January 1981. His father, a film buff, enrolled him in an acting course with María Elena Saldaña, and Huerta's later studies were alongside Carlos Torres Torrija and Luis Felipe Tovar.

Huerta is of Indigenous descent, with a Nahua maternal great-grandmother and a Purépecha paternal great-great-grandmother. He does not self-identify as Indigenous; however, he encourages people to learn more about their Indigenous heritage within and outside the community.

== Career ==
Huerta made his acting debut with a minor role in the film Así del precipicio (2006). In 2009, he appeared in Cary Joji Fukunaga's film Sin nombre, playing Li'l Mago, the leader of the Tapachula faction of the notorious Mara Salvatrucha gang.

In 2015, he appeared as Carlos Mamani in the biographical disaster survival film The 33, Alejo in Camino. In 2018, he began portraying Rafael Caro Quintero in Netflix's Narcos: Mexico.

In 2021, he appeared as Juan in The Forever Purge, the fifth film of The Purge franchise, alongside his fellow Narcos: Mexico costar Alejandro Edda.

In 2022, during a San Diego Comic-Con presentation for the Marvel Studios film Black Panther: Wakanda Forever, Huerta was revealed to have joined the cast to portray Namor. In Mexico, most reactions were positive, with a minority of negative reactions characterized as expressions of racism and malinchismo. Huerta himself spoke against racism in the film industry and stated that he was excited to play the character.

In 2023, Tenoch Huerta was cast as Juan Preciado in the film adaptation of Pedro Páramo, directed by Rodrigo Prieto. Based on Juan Rulfo's novel, the film premiered worldwide at the Toronto International Film Festival on September 14, 2024. It was later released on Netflix on November 6 of that year. In March 2025, he was confirmed to reprise his role as Namor in Avengers: Doomsday.

In June 2023, Huerta was accused of sexual abuse by musician and activist Maria Elena Ríos, who described him as a sexual predator and alleged that the Mexico-based activist organization Poder Prieto protected him. Huerta said they had dated for several months and that the relationship was "entirely consensual at all times," with the allegations prompting him to leave an upcoming Netflix project. In August 2024, Huerta publicly addressed the allegations, saying they had harmed his mental health while maintaining his innocence. In a public letter published by Proceso, he accused Ríos of attempting to extort him by demanding money in exchange for not damaging his reputation. Since then, Huerta received no legal notification nor formal complaint against him before the authorities.

In 2025, he appeared in Darren Aronofsky’s film Caught Stealing, joining a cast of renowned actors including Austin Butler, Zoë Kravitz, Matt Smith, Vincent D'Onofrio, among others. The scenes featuring Tenoch are set in Tulum, Mexico. The film premiered on August 28, 2025.

Playing the role of a reporter investigating the case of the Baladro sisters—linked to organized crime and shady business dealings—Tenoch is part of the cast of the series Las muertas, based on the novel by Jorge Ibargüengoitia, which in turn was inspired by the true story of Las Poquianchis. Directed by Luis Estrada, the series premiered on September 10, 2025.

On October 16, 2025, it was announced that he would join the cast of Eleven Days, a prison thriller directed by Peter Landesman. The film is set in Texas and is based on true events. This project marks a professional reunion with actor Diego Luna, with whom he previously collaborated on the Netflix series Narcos: Mexico

== Activism ==
In 2022, Huerta authored the book Orgullo Prieto (Brown Pride). The book delves into the racist constructs in Mexico and integrates personal narratives to provide a comprehensive understanding of the issue.

The same year, Huerta addressed UNESCO's Global Forum against Racism and Discrimination, amplifying his insights on activism and media representation on a global platform. His engagement with UNESCO extended to 2023, where he connected with over 2000 students, underscoring the imperative of recognizing privilege, challenging prevailing systems, and the potential of collective action to effect change.

Huerta was also a participant in a dialogue convened by the United Nations' Antiracism Working Group, a discussion held to commemorate the 75th anniversary of the Universal Declaration of Human Rights. His involvement epitomizes his commitment to confronting racism, an issue now addressed with increased urgency by institutions like the United Nations, largely due to the global resonance of movements like Black Lives Matter.

== Awards ==
Huerta won Best Actor at the Short Short Film Festival in Mexico City for his performance in Alonso Ruizpalacios' Café paraíso. He has also received five nominations for the Ariel Award, winning Best Actor for his role in Días de Gracia in 2012. Huerta won NAACP Image Awards 2023 supporting role in a motion picture, for his role as Namor in Black Panther: Wakanda Forever. Tenoch Huerta, has been nominated for the prestigious Pecime Award in the category of Best Actor. This nomination recognizes his outstanding performance and contribution to the film industry for Pedro Páramo.

On October 24, 2025, Tenoch Huerta was announced as the winner of the PRODU Awards in the category of Best Actor in a Film Released on a Streaming Platform. He received the award for his performance as Juan Preciado in *Pedro Páramo*, a film adaptation of the classic novel by Juan Rulfo. The recognition was part of the 9th edition of the PRODU Awards, which celebrate excellence in Ibero-American audiovisual production across television, film, and digital formats. Huerta's portrayal was praised for its emotional depth and fidelity to the literary character, further solidifying his standing as one of the region’s most respected actors.

== Filmography ==
=== Film ===
Year	Title	Roles	Notes
2006	Así del precipicio	Window cleaner	
2007	Malamados, en la soledad todo esta permitido	Aarón	
2007	Déficit	Adán	
2007	La zona	Mario	
2008	Sleep Dealer	David Cruz	
2008	Café paraíso	Gallo	Short film
2008	Road to Fame	Domingo	
2008	Nesio	El Araña	
2008	Soy mi madre	Ramón	
2008	Just Walking	David	
2009	Sin nombre	Lil' Mago	
2009	El horno	Boyfriend	Short film
2010	Marea alta	Gerónimo	
2010	Depositarios	Andrés	
2010	Chicogrande	Doctor Terán	
2010	¿Cómo has estado?	Obsmar	Short film
2010	El Infierno	The Devil	
2010	Busco empleo	Ramn	Short film
2011	Cristeros y Federales	Soldier	Short film
2011	Días de gracia	Teacher / Lupe	
2012	Vacaciones en el infierno	Carlos	
2012	Cristiada		Uncredited
2012	Get the Gringo	Carlos	
2012	Colosio: El asesinato	Jesús "Chuy"	
2012	De tierra	Julio	Short film
2012	La vida precoz y breve de Sabina Rivas	Juan	
2012	Penumbra	Ángel	Short film
2013	La banqueta	Abel	Short film
2013	Stand Clear of the Closing Doors	Ricardo Sr.	
2014	Güeros	Sombra	
2014	Mercy	Él	Short film
2014	Escobar: Paradise Lost	Roldano Brother	
2014	El más buscado	Charro Misterioso / Alfredo Ríos Galeana	
2015	The 33	Carlos Mamani	
2015	Semana Santa	Chávez	
2015	Camino	Alejo	
2015	Spectre	Mexican Man in Lift	
2015	Las Aparicio	Juan	
2016	La carga	Francisco Tenamaztle	
2016	Vive por mí	Gavilán	
2017	El silencio es bienvenido	Soldier 1	
2017	El autor	Enrique	
2017	Tigers Are Not Afraid	El Chino	
2017	Debris	Armando	Short film
2018	Bel Canto	Comandante Benjamín	
2020	Son of Monarchs	Mendel	
2020	Dark Forces	Franco	
2021	The Forever Purge	Juan	
2021	Madres	Beto	
2022	Black Panther: Wakanda Forever	Namor	Credited as Tenoch Huerta Mejía
2024	Pedro Páramo	Juan Preciado	
2025	Caught Stealing	Tulum Bartender	
2026	Avengers: Doomsday †	Namor	Post-production; Credited as Tenoch Huerta Mejía
TBA	Eleven Days †	TBA	Post-production
TBA	Copperhead †	TBA	Filming

=== Television ===
Year	Title	Roles	Notes
2008	Capadocia	Toño	2 episodes
2010	Los Minondo	Nacho	
2011	El Encanto del Águila	Emiliano Zapata	5 episodes
2012	Cloroformo	El Búfalo	13 episodes
2016	Hasta que te conocí	Nereo	3 episodes
2015–2016	Mozart in the Jungle	Manuel	2 episodes
2016–2017	Blue Demon	Alejandro Muñoz / Blue Demon	65 episodes
2018	Here on Earth	Adán Cruz	8 episodes
2018–2020	Narcos: Mexico	Rafael Caro Quintero	11 episodes
2023	The Chosen One	Lemuel	Miniserie (Netflix)
2025	Las muertas	Delfino	Miniserie (Netflix)
