= Morelia International Film Festival =

Film festival

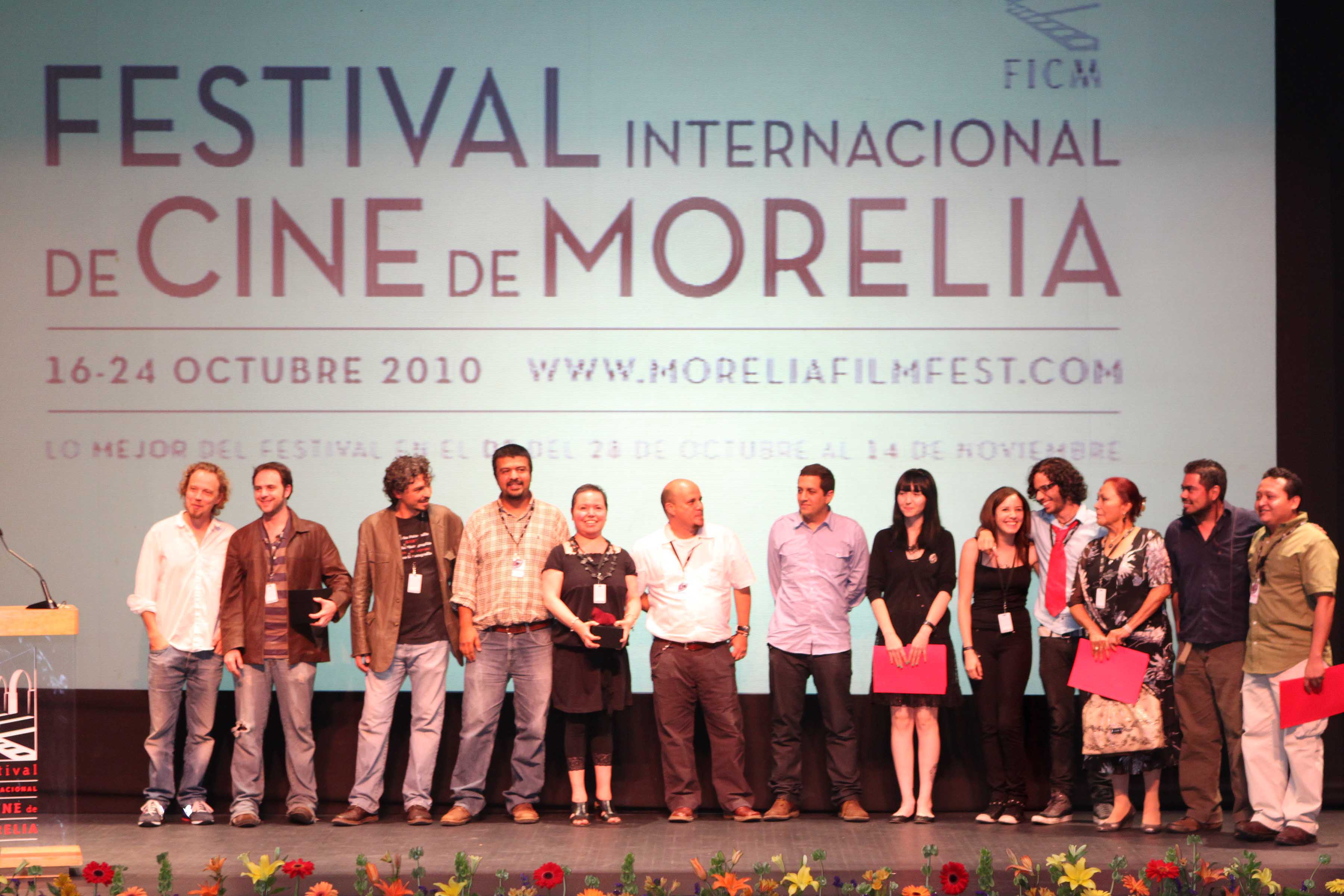
Winners FICM 2010.

The Morelia International Film Festival (Spanish: Festival Internacional de Cine de Morelia; FICM) was founded in 2003 in the city of Morelia, Michoacán, México. It is an annual event that takes place during the second week of October.

FICM emerged as a need to create a unique meeting point in México for the cinematographic community, the people of Michoacán, and international filmmakers. The festival's goal is to establish a forum to promote up-and-coming Mexican cinema talents, to create incentives and cultural opportunities for the Mexican and international public, and to display the cultural richness of the state of Michoacán.

The festival has achieved notable prestige and prominence in Mexico as a result of its outreach and growth. It is rapidly becoming known in other parts of the world for its uniqueness and quality.

== Award winners (Best Mexican Film) ==
Year	Film	Director	
2021	50 o dos ballenas se encuentran en la playa	Jorge Alberto Cuchí Espada	
2020	Sin señas particulares	Fernanda Valadez	
2019	Ya No Estoy Aquí	Fernando Frías	*
2018	La Camarista	Lila Avilés	
2017	Oso Polar	Marcelo Tobar	
2016	El Vigilante	Diego Ros	
2015	Yo	Matías Meyer	
2014	Carmín tropical	Rigoberto Perezcano	
2013	Workers	José Luis Valle	
2012	No Quiero Dormir Sola	Natalia Beristain	
2011	El Premio	Paula Markovitch	
2010	Las Marimbas del Infierno	Julio Hernández Cordón	
2010	Tierra Madre	Dylan Verrechia	
2009	Alamar	Pedro González Rubio	
2008	¿Dónde Están Sus Historias?	Nicolás Pereda	
2003	Niños de la Calle	Eva Aridjis	

== Special Guests ==
Notable jury presidents have included Ava DuVernay (2025), Alexander Payne (2024), Rodrigo Prieto (2023), Paweł Pawlikowski (2022), Volker Schlöndorff (2021), John Bailey (2020), Lila Avilés (2019), and Lynne Ramsay (2018).

Notable jury members have included Pablo Berger, David Linde, Andrea Pallaoro.

Other notable guests such as Olivier Assayas, Javier Bardem, Demián Bichir, Alfonso Cuarón, Geraldine Chaplin, Amat Escalante, Stephen Frears, Gael García Bernal, Terry Gilliam, Michel Gondry, Alejandro González Iñárritu, Salma Hayek, Todd Haynes, Werner Herzog, James Ivory, Alejandro Jodorowsky, Abbas Kiarostami, Pablo Larraín, Jennifer Lawrence, Tommy Lee Jones, Diego Luna, Julia Ormond, Marisa Paredes, Sally Potter, Edgar Ramírez, Carlos Reygadas, Robert Rodriguez, Volker Schlöndorff, Steven Soderbergh, Quentin Tarantino, Béla Tarr, Guillermo del Toro, Danny Trejo and Gus Van Sant among others.

== Accolades ==
=== Artistic Excellence Award ===
In 2018, the festival presented the inaugural lifetime Artistic Excellence Award to director Alfonso Cuarón prior to a screening of his landmark film Roma. In 2019, the award was presented to Robert Redford.

- 2018: Alfonso Cuarón
- 2019: Robert Redford
- 2022: Claire Denis
- 2023: Willem Dafoe, Jodie Foster
- 2024: Francis Ford Coppola
- 2025: Juliette Binoche

=== Michoacán Tribute ===
Every year, FICM honors an important figure of Mexican cinema from the state of Michoacán. In previous years, the festival has paid tribute to the filmmakers Miguel Contreras, Fernando Méndeza and the Alva brothers; the cinematographers Ezequiel Carrasco and José Ortiz Ramos; the actors Julio Alemán and Damián Alcázar; and the actresses Stella Inda and Lilia Prado.

== Critics’ Week ==
Since i2003, FICM has had an established partnership with the Critics’ Week of the Cannes Film Festival to promote Mexican filmmakers such as Alejandro Gonzalez Iñárritu, Guillermo del Toro and Fernando Eimbcke. A selection of films from the Critics’ Week is presented each year at FICM with the presence of some of their participants. Likewise, the Critics’ Week shows some of winning films from FICM.

== Academy Awards ==
Since 2008, the Academy of Motion Picture Arts and Sciences (AMPAS) of the United States officially recognized FICM by offering the winning fiction, documentary and animation short films at Morelia the opportunity to be considered for an Oscar® nomination.

== Parallel Activities ==
Once the activities in Morelia have ended, the festival presents the winning short films, documentaries and feature films and a selection of films shown outside of competition, at different Mexico City venues. Film series, outdoor screenings, conferences, round tables and exhibitions in Morelia, Pátzcuaro and Mexico City complete FICM’s year-round activities.

== See also ==
- Film festivals in North and Central America
- Premio Cuervo Tradicional
