= Celia (2015 TV series) =

Colombian telenova

- Genre: Telenovela
- Created by: Andrés Salgado; Paul Rodríguez
- Directed by: Víctor Mallarino; Liliana Bocanegra
- Starring: Jeimy Osorio; Aymée Nuviola; Modesto Lacén; Willy Denton; Carolina Gaitán; Abel Rodríguez; Margoth Velásquez; Aida Bossa; Luciano D'Alessandro; Jonathan Islas; Brenda Hanst; José Narváez; Alberto Pujol; Indhira Serrano; Jorge Cárdenas; Michell Guillo; Moisés Angulo; Marcela Gallego; Ivette Zamora; José Rojas; Mauricio Mauad; MUSIC BY; Alfredo De La Fe
- Opening theme: "La Negra Tiene Tumbao" by Celia Cruz
- Countries of origin: Colombia, United States
- Original language: Spanish
- No. of seasons: 1
- No. of episodes: 80

Production
- Executive producer: Nelsón Martínez
- Production locations: Cartagena, Bogotá, Colombia San Juan, Old San Juan, Puerto Rico

Original release
- Network: RCN Televisión
- Release: 5 October 2015 – 8 February 2016

Celia is a Spanish-language telenovela produced by Fox Telecolombia for RCN Televisión and Telemundo which is based on the life of Cuban singer Celia Cruz. The telenovela's theme "La Negra Tiene Tumbao" received an award for Television Theme Song of the Year, at the 2016 American Society of Composers, Authors and Publishers Awards.

== Plot ==
Celia tells the story of one of the legends of Latin music and her major international career: Celia Cruz. We know the beginnings of her passion for singing in Cuba starting in 1950, and her recognition as the most decisive singer of La Sonora Matancera. Leaving Cuba with her future husband Pedro Knight, a trumpeter with La Sonora Matancera, the series follows her departure from Cuba to Mexico soon after the Castro revolution took control of the island in 1959. The series then showcases her subsequent move to New York City, and follows her early days there, and then how her career conquered markets in other languages as she became one of the most recognized Salsa singers of all time. She honored the musical genre with her signature phrase "Azucar" (Sugar). The series showcases her love and longing for her Cuban country, always hoping that a positive change would come during her lifetime. Celia Cruz has become an invaluable legacy in the world in which she was renowned internationally as the "Queen of Salsa", "La Guarachera de Cuba", as well as "The Queen of Latin Music."

== Cast ==
=== Main ===
- Jeimy Osorio as Young Celia Cruz (Note: Music artist Patricia Padilla would provide vocal voiceover for the eighty songs featured in the soap opera. Padilla remained un-credited for her participation in the soap opera however would be listed in the after credits.)
- Aymée Nuviola as Celia Cruz
- Modesto Lacén as Young Pedro Knight
- Willy Denton as Pedro Knight
- Carolina Gaitán as Young Lola Calvo
- Abel Rodríguez as Eliécer Calvo
- Margoth Velásquez as Ollita Alfonso
- Aida Bossa as Young Noris Alfonso
- Luciano D'Alessandro as Young Alberto Blanco
- Jonathan Islas as Young Mario Agüero
- Brenda Hanst as Ana Alfonso
- José Narváez as René Neira
- Alberto Pujol as Rogelio Martínez
- Indhira Serrano as Myrelys Bocanegra
- Jorge Cárdenas as Caíto
- Michel Guillo as Gamaliel "Gamita" Alfonso
- Moisés Angulo as Simón Cruz
- Marcela Gallego as Lola Calvo
- Ivette Zamora as Noris Alfonso
- José Rojas as Alberto Blanco
- Mauricio Mauad as Mario Agüero

=== Recurring ===
- Carolina Sabino as Myrta Silva
- Diana Wiswell as Young Raquel Moreno
- Claudia De Hoyos as Raquel Moreno
- Carlos Vesga as Billy Echaverría
- Juan Alfonso Baptista as Ramón Cabrera
- Félix Antequera as Commander Fidel
- Luis Gerado Lopez as Commander Lilo Candela
- Mauricio Mejía as Commander Juan
- Mijail Mulkay as Tito Puente
- Bárbaro Marín as Rolando Laserie
- Laura Peñuela as Rita Laserie
- Andrés Echavarria as Larry Harlow
- Jean Phillipe Laurent as Jerry Masucci
- Luis Eduardo Arango as Johnny Pacheco
- Victor Gómez as Willie Colon
- Andy Caicedo as Oscarito
- Ariel Díaz as Prado
- Adrián Makalá as Ralphi

Note(s)

== Broadcast and audience ==
The series originally aired from 5 October 2015 to 5 February 2016 in Colombia on RCN Televisión. The series aired on Telemundo from 13 October 2015 until 8 February 2016.

In Colombia, the series premiered with 13.3 of rating, exceeding the program La Voz Kids Colombia. His final chapter by Caracol Televisión only got a total of 8.3 rating. In the United States the series debuted with 2.38 million viewers.

== Awards and nominations ==
Year	Award	Category	Nominated works	Result
2016	Premios Tu Mundo	Novela of the Year	Celia	Nominated
2016	Premios Tu Mundo	Favorite Lead Actor	Modesto Lacen	Nominated
2016	Premios Tu Mundo	Favorite Lead Actress	Jeimy Osorio	Nominated
2016	Premios Tu Mundo	The Best Bad Boy	Abel Rodríguez	Nominated
2016	Premios Tu Mundo	Favorite Actress	Carolina Gaitán	Won
2016	Premios Tu Mundo	The Perfect Couple	Jeimy Osorio and Modesto Lacen	Nominated
