= Laboriel =

Laboriel is a surname. Notable people with the surname include:

- Abe Laboriel, Jr. (born 1971), American drummer, son of Abraham
- Abraham Laboriel (born 1947), Mexican bass guitarist
- Ella Laboriel (born 1949), Mexican singer and actress
- Johnny Laboriel (1942–2013), Mexican singer
