= Ana de la Reguera =

Mexican actress

- Reguera in 2025
- Born: Anabell Gardoqui de la Reguera; 8 April 1977 (age 49); Heroica Veracruz, Veracruz, Mexico
- Occupation: Actress
- Years active: 1996–present

Anabell Gardoqui de la Reguera (Spanish pronunciation: [ˈana ðe la reˈɣeɾa]; born 8 April 1977) is a Mexican actress. She has starred in telenovelas, films, the HBO television series Eastbound & Down and Capadocia, the Amazon television series Goliath, and the 2006 comedy film Nacho Libre.

== Early life ==
Reguera was born in Heroica Veracruz, Veracruz, Mexico. Her mother, Nena de la Reguera, was a Miss Veracruz who became a journalist and television personality. Reguera began taking classes in classic ballet and later began performance arts studies at Instituto Veracruzano de la Cultura. She left Veracruz to study at Televisa's CEA, and later studied with Juan Carlos Corazza in Spain and then in Los Angeles with Aaron Spicer, Lisa Robertson, and Joan Scheckel.

== Acting career ==
=== Telenovelas ===
Reguera's acting career began with her role in the telenovela Azul (1996) followed by Pueblo chico, infierno grande (1997), with Verónica Castro, for which she received the Heraldo award for best female acting, and Desencuentro which was her third telenovela under the direction of Ernesto Alonso.

Tentaciones (1998) marked her beginning with the production company Argos Comunicación. She was immediately offered a role in Tentaciones and Todo por amor, for which she received the Palmas de or award.

Cara o Cruz was the first telenovela to be co-producted between Argos Comunicación and Telemundo. Reguera played María Salome in the telenovela Gitanas.

=== Television ===
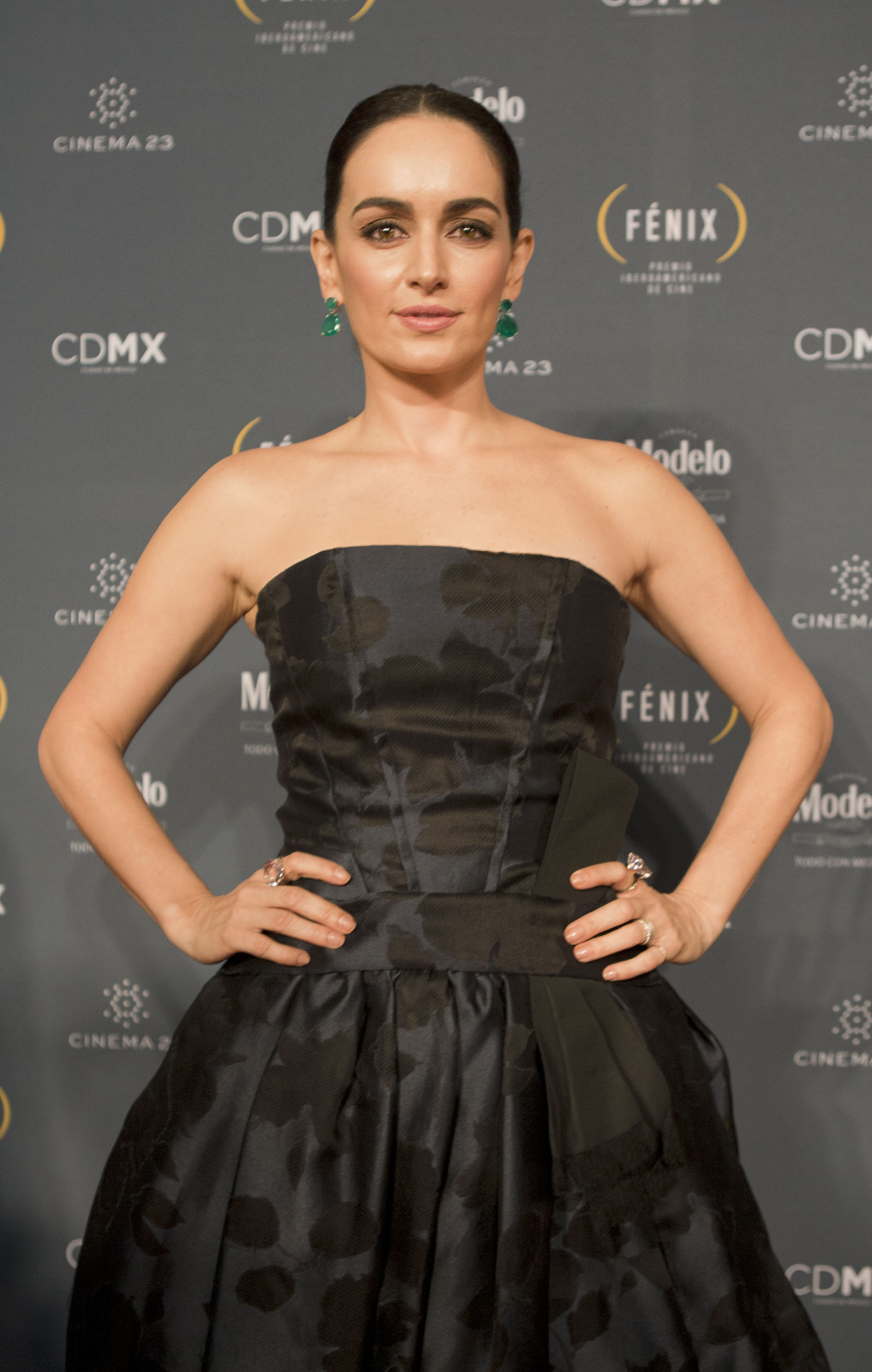
Ana de la Reguera at the Fenix Awards ceremony in Mexico City on October 30, 2014

In 2014, Reguera was cast in the Netflix crime drama Narcos as Elisa.

Reguera played the role of Lorena Guerra in the HBO series Capadocia. It ran for three seasons, beginning in 2008. The series received good reviews and awards.

Other television credits include Eastbound & Down, Twin Peaks, Power, From Dusk till Dawn: The Series and The Blacklist.

Reguera played the role of Marisol Silva in season 2 of Goliath as part of the main cast, and in season 3 as a recurring character. Season 2 aired in 2018 on Amazon Prime, while season 3 aired in 2019 on the same service.

=== Theater ===
Reguera participated in El Cartero, directed by Raúl Quintanilla, for which she received two awards from the Mexican Association of Theatre Journalists. She then played Desdemona in Othello and Danna in the play Nadando con Tiburones, alongside Demián Bichir and Alfonso Herrera.

=== Film ===
Her introduction to film was in Por la libre. Later she appeared in Ladies Night alongside Ana Claudia Talancón, for which she received an MTV Movie Award for 'Favorite Actress'. At the 40th Diosas de Plata Awards of the Mexican Cinema, she received the Dolores del Rio award. In 2005 she played the starring role in Gitanas which aired on Telemundo.

She is known for her role as Sister Encarnación in Nacho Libre. She played Sam Rockwell's wife Maria in Cowboys & Aliens.

She won a CANCACINE and Imagen Award for her role in Backyard, a 2009 Mexican crime film directed by directed by Carlos Carrera which was Mexican Choice for foreign film at the Oscars.

In 2010, she played the historical Josefa Quintana, a mistress of Mexican Independence War hero Miguel Hidalgo, played by Demián Bichir, in the film Hidalgo: La historia jamás contada.

Reguera played Carla in MGM's teen romance Everything, Everything.

She also appeared in Zack Snyder's film Army of the Dead and later also starred in The Forever Purge.

== Other ventures ==
In 2006, Reguera hosted the MTV Video Music Awards Latin America. She also co-hosted the 2018 Latin Grammy Awards alongside Carlos Rivera.

Reguera has been the face of CoverGirl, to be one of the company's official faces.

=== Charity ===
In September 2010, Reguera founded VeraCruzANA, a civil association. VeraCruzANA supports the underprivileged community in Veracruz, Mexico. It seeks to generate employment by promoting projects and programs that contribute to the development of community.

In 2017, Reguera served as chair of the ONE Children's Foundation, a 501(c)(3) non-profit organization founded by Claudia Pinto in the city of Los Angeles, which gave birth to Los Angeles en Mexico, a movement created by Reguera, Karla Souza, Kate del Castillo and Olga Segura, after the Puebla earthquake that hit Mexico on September 19, 2017.

== Filmography ==
Film
Year	Title	Role	Notes
2000	Por la libre	María	
2002	Un secreto de Esperanza	Lety	
2003	Ladies' Night	Ana	
2006	El Caco		
2006	Nacho Libre	Sister Encarnación	
2006	Así del precipicio	Lucía	
2007	Sultanes del Sur	Mónica Silvari	
2008	Paraiso Travel	Milagros	
2009	Empire State	Ellen Cochrane	
2009	Backyard	Blanca	
2010	Cop Out	Gabriela	
2010	Di Di Hollywood	Rita Marlow	
2010	Hidalgo: La historia jamás contada	Josefa Quintana	
2011	Cowboys & Aliens	Maria	
2014	Jessabelle	Rosaura	
2014	The Book of Life	Carmen Sánchez	Voice
2015	Las Aparicio	Alma	
2017	Everything, Everything	Carla	
2018	Collisions	Yoana	
2021	Army of the Dead	Maria Cruz	
2021	The Forever Purge	Adela	
2021	The King of All the World	Sara	
2022	Army of Thieves	Maria Cruz	Uncredited
2023	¡Que viva México!	Maria "Mari" Elena Reyes	
2025	Elio	Ambassador Turais	In both English and Latin American Spanish

== Television ==
Television
Year	Title	Role	Notes
1996	Azul	Cecilia	
1997	Pueblo chico, infierno grande	Priscila	
1997–1998	Desencuentro	Beatriz	
1998	Tentaciones	Fernanda Segovia	
2000–2001	Todo por amor	Lucía	
2001	Cara o cruz	Mariana Medina / Aída	
2002	Por tí	María Aldana / Isabel Miranda	
2003	Como Pedro por su casa	Astrid	
2003	Luciana y Nicolás	Luciana	
2004	Gitanas	María Salomé	
2008–2012	Capadocia	Lorena Guerra	
2009	Empire State	Ellen Cochrane	Pilot
2010	Eastbound & Down	Vida	Season 2
2010	Royal Pains	Carmen	
2014	Anger Management	Livi	
2015	The Blacklist	Vanessa Cruz	Episode 2.18, "Vanessa Cruz (No. 117)"
2015	Narcos	Elisa Álvarez	
2016	Drunk History: El Lado Borroso De La Historia	Amada Diaz	
2016	Jane the Virgin	Paola	
2016	From Dusk till Dawn: The Series	Venganza Vordugo	
2017–2019	Power	Alicia Jimenez	
2017	Twin Peaks	Natalie	
2018–2021	Goliath	Marisol Silva	
2020	Ana	Ana	
2024	Ojitos de Huevo	Bea Arjona	
2025	Mo	Ambassador's wife	Episode 2.1, "Oso Palestino "the Palestinian Bear"
2025	Papá soltero	Sandra	
