= Carolina Sepúlveda =

Colombian model and actress

Carolina Sepúlveda is a Colombian model and actress. She was born in Cúcuta, Colombia. Her television debut was as María in the drama series La viuda de la mafia. Her most notable performance on television has been in Sin senos no hay paraíso, and Sin senos sí hay paraíso as Ximena.

== Filmography ==
Film roles
Year	Title	Roles	Notes
2011	Sexo, mentiras y muertos	Lorena	Debut film
2018	La tribu	Carol	

Television roles
Year	Title	Roles	Notes
2004	La viuda de la mafia	María	
2005	Séptima puerta	Luisa Zapata	
2008–2009	Sin senos no hay paraíso	Ximena	
2008	Infieles anónimos	Ingrid	
2009–2010	Victorinos	Victorina Salinas	
2009–2010	Gabriela, giros del destino	Verónica Maldonado	Main cast; 119 episodes
2010	Decisiones extremas	Rosario / Wife	Episode: "Doble vida"
2011–2012	Tres Milagros	Lieutenant Sáchica	Recurring role
2016	La Hermandad	Rocío	Recurring role (season 1); 14 episodes
2016–2018	Sin senos sí hay paraíso	Ximena Fonseca	Recurring role (seasons 1–3); 125 episodes
2018	Like	Marcela	Main cast
