= 16th TVyNovelas Awards =

1998 Mexican TV awards

- Date: 1998
- Location: México D.F.
- Hosted by: Rebecca de Alba & Alfredo Adame

Highlights
- Most awards: Pueblo chico, infierno grande (5)
- Most nominations: Esmeralda (11)

Television/radio coverage
- Network: Canal de las Estrellas

The 16th TVyNovelas Awards were an academy of special awards to the best soap operas and TV shows. The awards ceremony took place on 1998 in Mexico D.F. The ceremony was televised in Mexico by Canal de las Estrellas.

Rebecca de Alba and Alfredo Adame hosted the show. Pueblo chico, infierno grande won 5 awards, the most for the evening. Other winners Esmeralda won 4 awards, including Best Telenovela, María Isabel, Mirada de mujer and Te sigo amando won 2 awards and Alguna vez tendremos alas, El alma no tiene color, Huracán and Salud, dinero y amor won 1 each.

== Summary of awards and nominations ==
Telenovela	Nominations	Awards
Esmeralda	11	4
Te sigo amando	8	2
Alguna vez tendremos alas	6	1
Pueblo chico, infierno grande	5	5
María Isabel	4	2
Mirada de mujer	4	2
Mi querida Isabel	2	0
El alma no tiene color	1	1
Huracán	1	1
Salud, dinero y amor	1	1

== Winners and nominees ==
=== Telenovelas ===
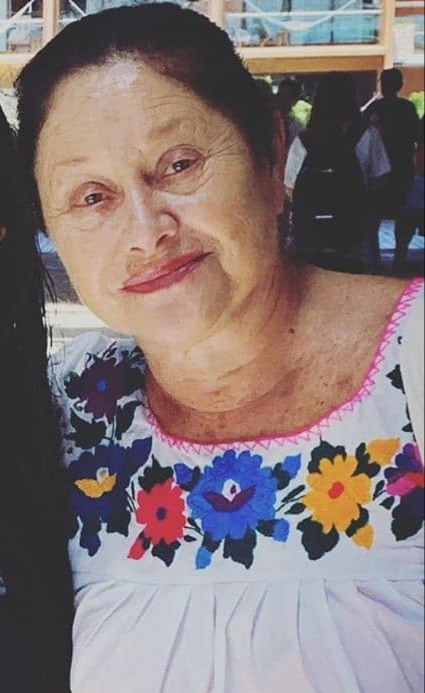
Angélica Aragón, winner for Best Actress.

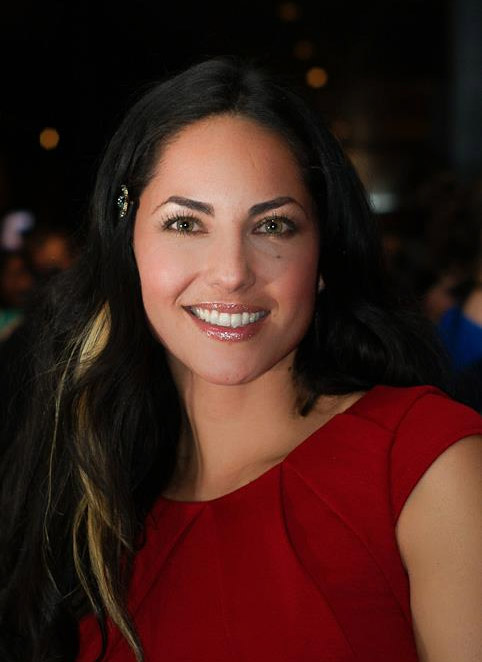
Bárbara Mori, winner for Best Debut Actress.

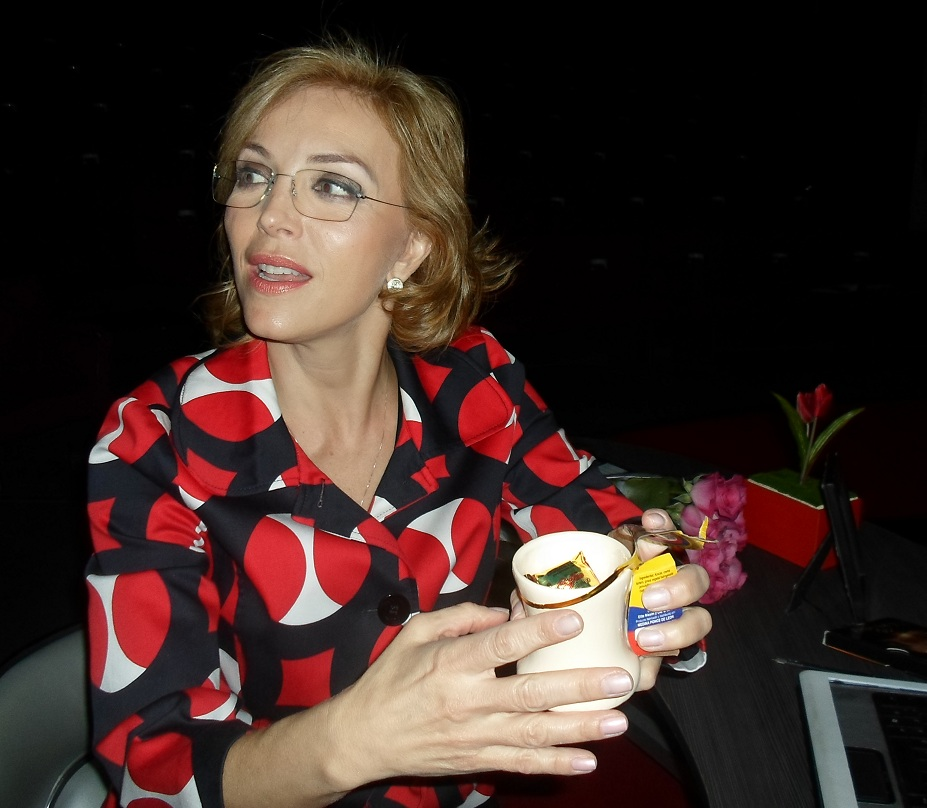
Laura Flores, winner for Best Musical Theme (with Marco Antonio Solís).

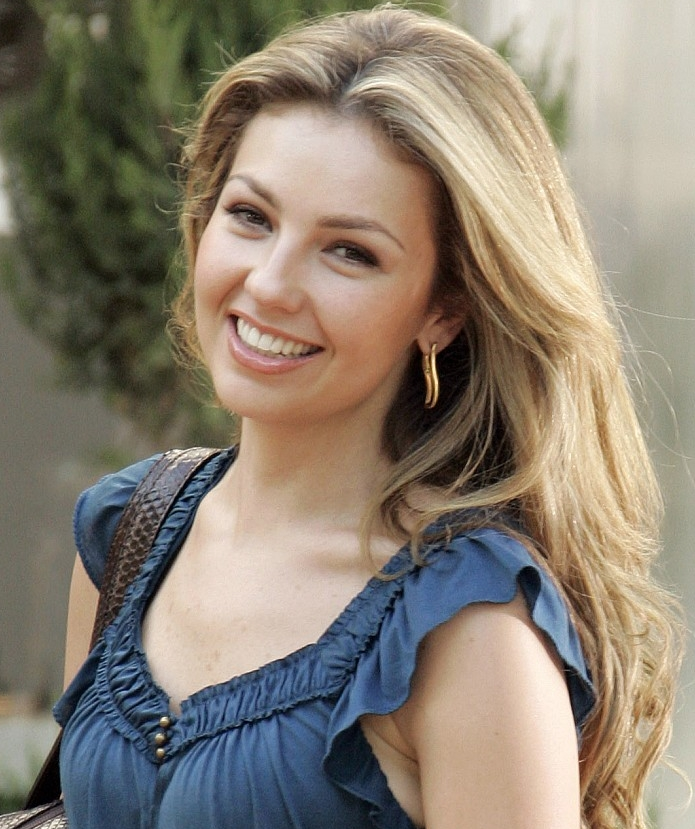
Thalía, awarded with a Special Award for International Projection.

Best Telenovela	Best Musical Theme
Esmeralda; Mirada de mujer; Te sigo amando	"El alma no tiene color" — Laura Flores and Marco Antonio Solís – El alma no tiene color
Best Actress	Best Actor
Angélica Aragón – Mirada de mujer; Claudia Ramírez – Te sigo amando; Leticia Calderon – Esmeralda	Sergio Goyri – Te sigo amando; Fernando Colunga – Esmeralda; Luis José Santander – Te sigo amando
Best Antagonist Actress	Best Antagonist Actor
Cynthia Klitbo – Alguna vez tendremos alas; Jacqueline Andere – Mi querida Isabel; Laura Zapata – Esmeralda	Héctor Suárez Gomís – Salud, dinero y amor; Alberto Estrella – Alguna vez tendremos alas; Salvador Pineda – Esmeralda
Best Leading Actress	Best Leading Actor
Katy Jurado – Te sigo amando; Carmen Montejo – Te sigo amando; Patricia Reyes Spíndola – María Isabel	Jorge Russek – Huracán; Enrique Lizalde – Esmeralda; Fernando Luján – Mirada de mujer
Best Supporting Actress	Best Supporting Actor
Alma Delfina – Pueblo chico, infierno grande; Margarita Isabel – Alguna vez tendremos alas; Raquel Olmedo – Esmeralda	José Carlos Ruiz – María Isabel; Édgar Vivar – Alguna vez tendremos alas; Juan Manuel Bernal – Te sigo amando
Best Young Lead Actress	Best Young Lead Actor
Adela Noriega – María Isabel; Karla Álvarez – Mi querida Isabel; Kate del Castillo – Alguna vez tendremos alas	Juan Soler – Pueblo chico, infierno grande; Fernando Carrillo – María Isabel; Osvaldo Benavides – Te sigo amando
Best Revelation	Best Debut Actress
Alejandro Ruiz – Esmeralda; Eugenia Cauduro – Alguna vez tendremos alas; Nora Salinas – Esmeralda	Bárbara Mori – Mirada de mujer

=== Others ===
Best Direction	Best Direction of the Cameras
Beatriz Sheridan, Martha Luna and Karina Duprez – Esmeralda	Jesús Nájera Saro – Esmeralda
Best Art Direction	Best Decor
Arturo Flores – Pueblo chico, infierno grande	Sandra Cortés – Pueblo chico, infierno grande
Best Original Story or Adaptation
Javier Ruán – Pueblo chico, infierno grande

=== Special awards ===
- Award for Career: Libertad Lamarque
- Award for Career: Eric del Castillo
- Career as a Singer: Enrique Guzmán
- International Projection: Thalía
- Best Entertainer: Adal Ramones
- Best Presenters: Guillermo Ochoa and Lucero for Teletón 1997
- Best Teletheater Program with Social Content: Mujer, casos de la vida real
- Best Album: Me estoy enamorando by Alejandro Fernández
