= Cloroformo =

Mexican television series

- Genre: Drama
- Created by: Gustavo Loza
- Directed by: Alfonso Pineda Ulloa
- Music by: Federico Bonasso
- Country of origin: Mexico
- Original language: Spanish
- No. of seasons: 1
- No. of episodes: 13

Production
- Executive producers: Mariana Arredondo; Ana Laura Rascón; Mariano Carranco
- Cinematography: Natalia Seligson
- Editor: Gerónimo Denti Generali
- Production company: Adicta Films

Original release
- Network: Televisa Deportes Network
- Release: 12 March 2012

Cloroformo: Los peores golpes se dan abajo del ring, or simply Cloroformo is a Mexican sports boxing drama television series created by Gustavo Loza, and produced by Adicta Films for Televisa Networks. The series consists of 13 episodes of one hour and is stars Álex Perea, Gustavo Sánchez Parra, Zuria Vega, Osvaldo Benavides, and Tenoch Huerta. It premiered on 12 March 2012 on Televisa Deportes Network, and on 22 March 2012 on Golden Latin America. Although Televisa Deportes Network authorized the series for a second season, the production of the second season of the series was never done.

== Cast ==
- Tenoch Huerta as El Búfalo
- Zuria Vega as Valerie
- Gustavo Sánchez Parra as Gomorra
- Osvaldo Benavides as Joe
- Manuel "Flaco" Ibáñez as Don Roque
- Vanessa Bauche as Mirella
- María Rojo as Doña Consuelo
- Ilithya Manzanilla as Paula
- Álex Perea as Asís

== Episodes ==
No.	Title	Directed by	Written by	Original release date
1	"Tiempo de pelea"	Alfonso Pineda Ulloa	Gustavo Loza	12 March 2012
2	"Visa denegada"	Alfonso Pineda Ulloa	Gustavo Loza	TBA
3	"El Joe paga sus cuentas pendientes"	Alfonso Pineda Ulloa	Gustavo Loza	TBA
4	"Camino a Las Vegas"	Alfonso Pineda Ulloa	Gustavo Loza	TBA
5	"Golpes bajos"	Alfonso Pineda Ulloa	Gustavo Loza	TBA
6	"Como en los viejos tiempos"	Alfonso Pineda Ulloa	Gustavo Loza	TBA
7	"Regreso sin gloria"	Alfonso Pineda Ulloa	Gustavo Loza	TBA
8	"Ya no quiero Disneylandia"	Alfonso Pineda Ulloa	Gustavo Loza	TBA
9	"A veces perdiendo se gana"	Alfonso Pineda Ulloa	Gustavo Loza	TBA
10	"El regreso"	Alfonso Pineda Ulloa	Gustavo Loza	TBA
11	"En busca del sueño"	Alfonso Pineda Ulloa	Gustavo Loza	TBA
12	"Reglas claras"	Alfonso Pineda Ulloa	Gustavo Loza	TBA
13	"El último round"	Alfonso Pineda Ulloa	Gustavo Loza	TBA
