= Te sigo amando =

Television series

- Genre: Telenovela; Romance; Drama
- Created by: Delia Fiallo
- Written by: René Muñoz; Ricardo Fiallega
- Directed by: Miguel Córcega; Mónica Miguel
- Starring: Claudia Ramírez; Luis José Santander; Sergio Goyri; Olivia Collins
- Opening theme: Te sigo amando performed by Juan Gabriel
- Country of origin: Mexico
- Original language: Spanish
- No. of episodes: 115 (Original version); 97 (International version)

Production
- Executive producer: Carla Estrada
- Producer: Arturo Lorca
- Production locations: Filming; Televisa San Ángel; Mexico City, Mexico
- Cinematography: Alejandro Frutos; Jesús Acuña Lee
- Running time: 21-22 minutes (episodes 1-35); 41-44 minutes (episodes 36-115)
- Production company: Televisa

Original release
- Network: Canal de las Estrellas
- Release: November 18, 1996 – May 2, 1997

Related
- Monte calvario (1986); La que no podía amar (2011-2012); Amanecer (2025)

Te sigo amando (English: I Still Love You) is a Mexican telenovela produced by Carla Estrada for Televisa in 1996. The script was written by René Muñoz and it is an adaptation of Delia Fiallo's original radionovela La mujer que no podía amar. It was a remake of the 1986 telenovela Monte calvario. The telenovela aired on Canal de las Estrellas from November 18, 1996 to May 2, 1997.

It stars Claudia Ramírez, Luis José Santander, Sergio Goyri and Olivia Collins.

== Plot ==
The majesty of the Mexican province is witness to a passionate love triangle: Yulissa (Claudia Ramírez) is the vertex of the dispute between the landowner Ignacio Aguirre (Sergio Goyri), master of the prosperous "Arroyo Negro" estate, and Luis Ángel Zaldívar (Luis José Santander), a prestigious medical specialist.

Yulissa is a beautiful teenaged schoolgirl from a good family, who along with her brother, Alberto (Juan Manuel Bernal), and her grandmother, Paula (Carmen Montejo), live heavily in debt.

Their situation forces them to mortgage their assets, which is why Yulissa sees herself seriously involved with Ignacio Aguirre, because he desires her and she is the price of avoiding ruin.

However, a woman's heart is not sold to the highest bidder, it is given to the man she loves; therefore, from the moment Yulissa meets Dr. Zaldívar, both her life and prospects take a radical turn, while Ignacio, who does not know defeat, prepares to give battle.

== Cast ==
=== Main ===
- Claudia Ramírez as Yulissa
- Luis José Santander as Luis Ángel
- Sergio Goyri as Ignacio
- Olivia Collins as Leticia

=== Also main ===
- Katy Jurado as Justina
- Marga López as Chief Nun
- María Rojo as Felipa
- Magda Guzmán as Ofelia
- Guillermo Murray as Arturo
- René Muñoz as Father Murillo
- Juan Manuel Bernal as Alberto
- Mónica Prado as Estela
- Aurora Clavel as Tránsito
- Harry Geithner as Lencho
- Osvaldo Benavides as Lazarito
- Alejandra Procuna as Elisa
- Arturo Lorca as Chucho
- Andrés Gutiérrez as Danilo
- Lorena Enríquez as Consuelito
- Cristina Saralegui as herself

=== Recurring and guest stars ===
- Guillermo Aguilar as Dr. Martínez
- Socorro Avelar as Hermelinda
- Katie Barberi as Andrea
- Enrique Becker as Dr. Zamora
- Kuno Becker as Humberto
- Luis Bernardos as Rogaciano
- Jesús Betanzos as Chava
- María Eugenia Bravo as Nurse
- Víctor Carpinteiro as Roberto
- Yadhira Carrillo as Teresa
- Chela Castro as Fabiana
- Gabriela Castro as Lucía
- Alberto Chávez as Cirilo
- Consuelo Duval as Natalia
- Carlos Eduardo as Lalito
- José Antonio Ferral as Cubillas
- Nerina Ferrer as Martina
- América Gabriel as Claudia
- Juan Gabriel as himself
- Amparo Garrido as Matilde
- Claudia Guzmán as Young Ofelia
- Maty Huitrón as Luz María
- Ela Laboriel as Clarita
- Lucero Lander as Fabiana's assistant
- Kokin Li as Omar
- Eduardo Liñán as Julio
- Ariel López Padilla as Doctor
- Melba Luna as Rosa
- Raúl Magaña as David
- Javier Martínez as Singer
- Felicia Mercado as Dr. Carmen
- Sergio Morante as Juan
- Lucha Moreno as Emilia
- Rosana Paintes as Carmelita
- Héctor Parra as Enrique
- Benjamín Pineda as Jacinto
- Marcelo Portela as Silverio
- Alejandro Rábago as Fidencio
- Manuela Rasaldi as Dorita
- Manuel Raviela as Mario
- Tito Reséndiz as Octavio
- Fabián Robles as Óscar
- Javier Ruiz as Tomás
- Teo Tapia as Dr. Zavala
- Patricia Thomas as Silvia
- Alejandro Villeli as Gudelio
- Rocío Yaber as Efigenia
- Guillermo Zarur as Hurtado
- María Clara Zurita as Marina
- Carmen Montejo as Paula

== Awards and nominations ==
Year	Award	Category	Nominee(s)	Result
1998	TVyNovelas Awards	Best Telenovela	Carla Estrada	Nominated
1998	TVyNovelas Awards	Best Actress	Claudia Ramírez	Nominated
1998	TVyNovelas Awards	Best Actor	Luis José Santander	Nominated
1998	TVyNovelas Awards	Best Actor	Sergio Goyri	Won
1998	TVyNovelas Awards	Best Leading Actress	Carmen Montejo	Nominated
1998	TVyNovelas Awards	Best Leading Actress	Katy Jurado	Won
1998	TVyNovelas Awards	Best Supporting Actor	Juan Manuel Bernal	Nominated
1998	TVyNovelas Awards	Best Young Lead Actor	Osvaldo Benavides	Nominated
1998	Palmas de Oro Awards	Best Male Revelation	Harry Geithner	Won
1998	El Heraldo de México Awards	Best Musical Theme	"Te sigo amando" by Juan Gabriel	Won
1998	Latin ACE Awards	Best Scenic Program	Carla Estrada	Won
1998	Latin ACE Awards	Best Actor	Sergio Goyri	Won
1998	Latin ACE Awards	Best Supporting Actor	Harry Geithner	Won
1998	Latin ACE Awards	Best Direction	Mónica Miguel	Won
