= La viuda de la mafia =

La Viuda de la Mafia is a Colombian series, produced by Coestrellas for RCN Televisión.

The series protagonists were Carolina Gómez and the Cuban actor Abel Rodríguez, the series antagonist were Patrick Delmas and the telenovelas debut of Katherine Porto.

Careful counseling that included interviews with real wives of drug lords shows reality to the Colombian telenovela. A woman discovers, after the murder of her husband, who profits from drug trafficking family, your children are in danger, that society identifies as criminal and that the man who just falling in love is an undercover agent.

== Plot ==
Diana Montes is a flight attendant who puts her career aside to raise a family. Her husband, Octavio, is a commercial pilot from a wealthy family.

Diana with her husband and children engage in what appeared to be an exotic adventure trip through the jungles of Colombia to celebrate a second honeymoon. She thought her life was perfect up in the middle of a chase, he discovers that the great love of his life looking for the drug trafficking charge.

In the middle of a shootout, Diana's husband dies, making it "The Widow of the Mafia", a woman who authorities said as the hub of any illegal organization, which hides an enormous fortune. Besides the Judicial Police Division (DPJ), lost in the chase to one of his detectives, who happens to be the companion and brother of Camilo Pulido, who will not rest until revenge on Diana

In appearances, everything is perfectly clear. But Camilo approaches Diana the situation becomes confusing. She does not seem to be guilty and may even be innocent. Camilo's obsession exceed professional interest. What we still do not know is that behind her, fortune and business, is the real brain: Aníbal Montes.
