= Dust to Dust (2000 film) =

Por la libre
- Directed by: Juan Carlos de Llaca
- Written by: Antonio Armonía
- Produced by: Anna Roth
- Starring: Osvaldo Benavides; Rodrigo Cachero; Ana de la Reguera
- Cinematography: Checco Varese
- Edited by: Jorge García
- Music by: Gabriela Ortiz
- Release date: 13 October 2000; (Mexico)
- Running time: 96 minutes
- Country: Mexico
- Language: Spanish

Por la libre (released internationally under the English title Dust to Dust) is a 2000 Mexican road movie directed by Juan Carlos de Llaca, narrating the journey of two Mexican teenagers from Mexico City to Acapulco to accomplish their grandfather's last wish. The movie won the Audience Choice Award at the Chicago Latino Film Festival and a Special Mention at the Havana Film Festival.

== Plot ==
The movie opens as the two protagonists, Rodrigo and Rocco join their families to hold a birthday party for their grandfather, Rodrigo Carnicero, who through most of the movie is only referred to as "El abuelo" (Spanish for Grandpa). Rodrigo is a regular middle-class teenager, while Rocco (who, in fact, is also named Rodrigo but shortens his name to Rocco) is rather more unconventional, a marijuana user and writer for an independent magazine, and has deep conflicts with his father Luis.

Despite being cousins and the best efforts of the grandfather, Rodrigo and Rocco have a troubled relationship and are constantly harsh to each other. During the meal, the boys' parents (the sons of Carnicero) talk about the grandfather's will and the upcoming marriage of Luis. After a furious fight with Luis, Carnicero suffers a heart attack and dies.

After Carnicero's death, the family goes into conflict about the terms of his will, which grants money to a longtime friend even when Luis and his brother claim he does not have a right to anything as he is not related to Carnicero, the fact that Rodrigo inherited his grandfather's car, and the expenses of running the big house where he lived. After a funeral mass, held despite the desire Carnicero stated in his will, Rocco realizes his father and uncles are not willing to fulfill the other petition on the will: to have his ashes thrown into the sea at sunrise, in Acapulco, and decides to do it on his own.

After stealing Rodrigo's car, Rocco talks his cousin into joining him on the trip. Despite the movie title, they do not drive by the free highway but by the autopista, where they have to pay tolls. By the time they arrive in Acapulco, they're almost out of money. Then starts a recurring event in the movie, where the boys spin the funerary urn to solve a disagreement, under the idea of "letting grandpa choose", in this case, to decide whether visiting Rodrigo's girlfriend Irina or Grandpa's friend Felipe to borrow money. The outcome leads them to visit Felipe in his restaurant, where they get a loan and Rocco notices an attractive girl who just left a bunch of flyers advertising a hotel. Rocco takes one of the flyers and they rent a room in the hotel.

Then they disagree about the plans for the night: Rodrigo wants to go to a disco with Irina and Rocco wants to take the ashes to a cantina. The urn-spinning game is used again to decide, and Rodrigo wins. As he is leaving with Irina, he convinces Rocco (who does not have a date) to invite the girl from the hotel, Maria, to the disco. There, Rocco gets bored as he cannot dance, and out of boredom tastes the ashes, which makes Rodrigo take the urn to the dance floor where it gets misplaced. After recovering the urn, he and Maria go to a coffee

shop and talk, discovering they have a lot in common and like each other. Returning to the hotel, they have sex.

At the same time, Rodrigo and Irina get back from the disco, but they find the hotel room locked and neither of them has money to rent another. They decide to have sex in Rodrigo's car, but are caught by the police and Rodrigo is arrested. He calls Rocco, who uses his remaining money to bribe an officer and take him out of detention. By then, it's morning, so the boys take the urn and go to the beach, but they find out the ashes have been replaced by corn chips. They engage in a fight, each blaming the other for the loss, and return to the disco to search for the ashes, but there the garbage has already been thrown out.

In Mexico City, Rodrigo and Rocco's Aunt, Pureza, discovers the ashes are missing. She and Rodrigo's father (also named Rodrigo) leave Mexico City right away to Acapulco, while Luis stays in Mexico City.

Back in the hotel room, Rocco discovers a small amount of grey powder on the floor, which he claims tastes like the ashes, and both deduce Maria has taken them, as she stayed in the room while Rocco was getting Rodrigo out of jail. At Maria's house, right next to the hotel, they look at her family pictures and discover Maria is Rodrigo Carnicero's illegitimate daughter, and therefore their aunt. She confronts them and refuses to give back the ashes, forcing them to leave, and then at request of her mother, Perla (who had been Carnicero's lover) explains to her what happened.

Maria and Perla decide to bury the ashes (stolen by Maria in a corn chip bag, which is why the corn chips were in the urn) in their garden, but on second thought, divide them in two, and decide to bury one half in the garden and give the other to the boys so they can throw it in the sea.

Out of rage and shocked by the revelation, Rodrigo slams the car he inherited from his grandfather, but he and Rocco end up coming to terms with Perla and Maria's decision and accept the half they are given. Rocco gives Maria a watch (left to him by Carnicero in his will, and named as his most beloved possession) and they kiss again, despite knowing they are related, while Rocco builds a warm friendship with Perla. Knowing the visit to Acapulco has been quite eventful, and fearing they'll lose the rest of the ashes, they spin the urn one last time, to decide whether to throw the ashes on sunrise or sunset. Sunset wins.

On the dock, Rocco, Rodrigo and Maria meet with Pureza and Rodrigo Sr., but his father fights with Rodrigo about the almost destroyed car, only to discover Rodrigo has matured and stands up to him. Finally, he stays on the dock, and only the three youths and Pureza board the ship. Pureza sees that Maria has the watch, deducing the relation between her and her father, and Rodrigo and Rocco are shown to have built a bond, supporting each other. The movie closes when all four say goodbye to Carnicero and throw the ashes.

== Cast ==
- Osvaldo Benavides as Rodrigo Carnicero Esquivel, shortened Rocco, one of the two lead characters. He's a pre-university student, and says he wants to study archeology or philosophy. He also claims to have forced his mother to leave home, after he found her cheating on his father, but it's never clearly stated if it's true or made-up, although he says that for a time he thought it was his fault. He writes for an independent magazine and is a regular marijuana user.
- Rodrigo Cachero as Rodrigo Carnicero Martínez, the other lead character, who goes by the name Rodrigo. He's much more conventional than Rocco. He has a steady girlfriend, Irina, and is also a pre-university student.
- Ana de la Reguera as Maria, Carnicero's illegitimate daughter and Rocco's love interest. Despite being offered a scholarship to study oceanography in Baja California, she's willing to turn it down in order to help her mother run a hotel.
- Otto Sirgo as Rodrigo Sr., Rodrigo's father. He's depicted as an imposing father, always trying to force his will on his son, despite Rodrigo's wishes. Rodrigo states his father always treats him like a child.
- Pilar Ixquic Mata (Credited as Pilar Mata) as Pureza, addressed during the movie as Puri, Carnicero's daughter. She never married in order to take care of her parents, but at Carnicero's funeral mass, she accidentally manages to meet a man. By the end of the movie she announces she's pregnant.
- Alejandro Tomasi as Luis, Rocco's father. Of all the boy's parents and uncles, he's the one depicted in the most negative light, shown as greedy, completely uncaring of what his father or son want, and only concerned with his impending wedding. He's said to have gone through many unsuccessful marriages, each time increasing the age disparity between him and his wives (Carnicero says that Rocco's stepmothers are closer to Rocco's own age each time). When Pureza discovers that the ashes are missing, he's the only one of the sons of Carnicero who does not go to Acapulco, only wishing Pureza and Rodrigo Sr. a nice trip.
- Gina Morett as Perla, Carnicero's lover and Maria's mother. Years before the events depicted in the movie, she worked as a chef at Felipe's restaurant, where she met Carnicero and got involved with him, and later left to start running a hotel on her own. She's a great cook.
- Alexia Witt as Irina, Rodrigo's girlfriend. She seems to be from a higher social class than the other youths in the movie, as she drives her own car (the only other teenager with a car of his own is Rodrigo, and he inherited it), and her family either spend summers in Acapulco or have a house there.
- Héctor Ortega as Felipe, Carnicero's longtime friend. Like Carnicero, he's a Spanish expatriate living in Mexico. He owns a restaurant in Acapulco, and is aware of Carnicero's affair with Perla, something he kept secret for over twenty years. In Carnicero's will, he inherits an undisclosed amount of money, presumably destined for Maria and Perla.
- Xavier Massé as Rodrigo Carnicero, a Spanish doctor living in Mexico as an expatriate. He's Rodrigo's and Rocco's grandfather. He dies the day of his 75th birthday, and his wish to have his ashes thrown to Acapulco's sea starts the main plot of the movie. As he asked to be cremated without any religious ceremony, he's likely an atheist. He had three children and four grandchildren from his marriage, and a daughter from his affair with Perla.

== Reception ==
The film was generally well received.
