= Osvaldo Benavides =

Mexican actor and filmmaker (born 1979)

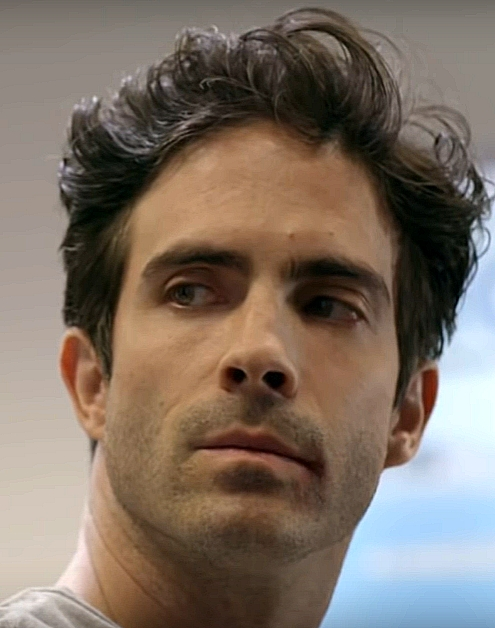
- Benavides in 2018
- Born: 14 June 1979 (age 47); Mexico City, Mexico
- Occupations: Actor, writer, producer, cinematographer
- Years active: 1992–present

Osvaldo Benavides (born June 14, 1979, in Mexico City, Mexico) is a Mexican actor, writer, producer and cinematographer.

== Early life ==
Born in Mexico City, Mexico, currently resides in Tepoztlán, Morelos. Osvaldo began acting at age 9 years. He has participated in musical theater rods as: "El Graduado" and "Todos eran mis hijos".

== Career ==
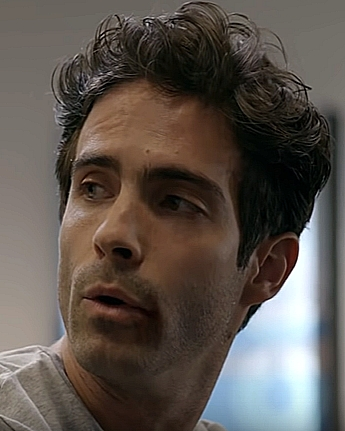
Benavides as Juan Pablo in the Univision's series La bella y las bestias.

Benavides began his career in television from an early age, on the telenovela El abuelo y yo, alongside Gael García Bernal and Ludwika Paleta. Two years later, in 1995 he played Nandito, the lost son of María la del Barrio, thanks to his character, he won in the edition 14th TVyNovelas Awards for Best Young Lead Actor. In that same year he also participated in the telenovela El premio mayor as Chicles. In 1996 he played Lazarito in the telenovela Te sigo amando, alongside Claudia Ramírez, and Luis José Santander, and won again at the 16th TVyNovelas Awards as Best Young Lead Actor. In 1998, he participated in the telenovela Preciosa, and later in the film La primera noche, with the latter he made his film debut, and for which he stood out. In the year 2000, he participated in telenovela Locura de amor, and again stood out in the cinema as Rocco, in the film Por la libre.

In 2001, he participated in the film Piedras verdes, a film about the philosophical-spiritual discovery of the protagonist. In that same year he also participated in the film La segunda noche, and Seres humanos. In 2002, he appeared in Daniela, and two years later he played Damián in the telenovela Piel de otoño, and in 2006 to Curioso, in the film Un mundo maravilloso. After these last two productions, he moved away from the world of telenovelas and the acting for eleven years.

In 2022, Osvaldo began filming Noche de Bodas (Wedding Night); Osvaldo will direct and star in the production. On October 12, 2022, during a break in filming on Majahual beach in Oaxaca Mexico, two actors, Marco Antonio Curiel Pérez and Luis Manuel Gutiérrez, died by drowning. The two men who worked as extras on the production could not escape the sea due to high tide. A third actor managed to be rescued successfully.

== Filmography ==
=== Films roles ===
Year	Title	Role	Notes
1998	La primera noche	Sergio	
2000	Dust to Dust	Rocco	
2001	Piedras verdes	Sebastián	
2001	La segunda noche	Alfonso	
2001	Seres humanos	Damián	
2002	El mago	Unknown	Short film
2003	Zurdo	Unknown	
2003	Ligerita	Unknown	Short film
2006	Un mundo maravilloso	Curioso	
2010	SubHysteria	Ariel	Also writer, and associate producer
2012	El Santos vs la Tetona Mendoza	La Lisiada Novela Actor	
2013	Me late chocolate	Alex	
2014	The Perfect Dictatorship	Ricardo Díaz	
2015	El cielo es azul	Auturo	
2018	Todo mal	Fernando	
2018	Más sabe el Diablo por viejo	Teo	
2019	Mentada de padre	Fausto	
2022	Noche de bodas		Production on hold due to accident

=== Television roles ===
Year	Title	Role	Notes
1992	El abuelo y yo	Paco	
1995	El premio mayor	Chicles	
1995–1996	María la del Barrio	Fernando de la Vega Hernández "Nando / Nandito"	
1996	Te sigo amando	Lazarito	
1998	Preciosa	Simón Ortiz	
2000	Locura de amor	León Palacios	
2002	Mujer, Casos de la Vida Real	Unknown	Episode: "Cruz de fuego"
2002	Daniela	Andrés Miranda	
2010–2012	Soy tu fan	Julián Muñoz	Series regular; 12 episodes
2010	Gritos de muerte y libertad	Lucas Alamán	Episode: "Sangre que divide"
2011–2012	La que no podía amar	Miguel Carmona Flores	Main role; 152 episodes
2012	Cloroformo	Joe	Main role; 13 episodes
2013–2014	Lo que la vida me robó	Dimitrio Mendoza	Main role; 183 episodes
2015	A que no me dejas	Adrián Olmedo	Main role (part 1); 70 episodes
2016	Ruta 35	Mercurio Acosta	Main role; 35 episodes
2018	La bella y las bestias	Juan Pablo Quintero	Main role; 66 episodes
2018–2019	El Rey del Valle	Luis Miguel del Valle	Main role (seasons 1–2); 26 episodes
2019–2021	Monarca	Andrés Carranza Dávila	Main role; 18 episodes
2021	La suerte de Loli	Rafael Contreras	Main role; 103 episodes
2021	The Good Doctor	Dr. Mateo Rendon Osma	Guest role (season 4); Main role (season 5), 6 episodes
2023	El colapso	Alberto	Guest role; 2 episodes
2026	Hermanas, un amor compartido	Alonso	Main role

== Awards and nominations ==
Year	Award	Category	Nominated work	Result
1996	14th TVyNovelas Awards	Best Young Lead Actor	María la del Barrio	Won
1998	16th TVyNovelas Awards	Best Young Lead Actor	Te sigo amando	Won
2015	33rd TVyNovelas Awards	Best Supporting Actor	Lo que la vida me robó	Won
2015	Diosa de Plata Awards	Best Role of Men	La dictadura perfecta	Won
2016	34th TVyNovelas Awards	Best Leading Actor	A que no me dejas	Nominated
