= Más sabe el Diablo por viejo =

- Directed by: José Pepe Bojórquez
- Screenplay by: Alfredo Félix-Díaz
- Story by: Brad Hall; Ty Granoroli
- Starring: Osvaldo Benavides; Sandra Echeverría
- Cinematography: Chris Chomyn
- Edited by: Camilo Abadía
- Music by: Benjamin Shwartz
- Production companies: Fox International Productions; La Victoria Films; Traziende Films
- Distributed by: 20th Century Fox
- Release date: 26 July 2018 (Mexico)
- Countries: Mexico; United States
- Language: Spanish

Más sabe el Diablo por viejo (lit. 'The more the devil knows for old') is a 2018 Mexican comedy film directed by José Pepe Bojórquez, from a screenplay by Bojórquez, and Alfredo Félix-Díaz. It is an original story of Brad Hall, and Ty Granoroli. The film premiered on 26 July 2018 in Mexico, and is stars Osvaldo Benavides, and Sandra Echeverría.

== Cast ==
- Osvaldo Benavides as Teo
- Sandra Echeverría as Dafne
- Martín Altomaro as Red
- Arturo Barba as Hugo Bellamy
- Ignacio López Tarso as Joselito
- Isela Vega as Marilú Sáez
- Lorena Velázquez as Angélica Aguirre
- Tara Parra as Victoria Placeres
- Tina Romero as Nelly Durán
- Patricio Castillo as Rudy Macedo
- Roger Cudney as Stuart Young
- Juan Luis Orendain as Antonio Abud
- Lupita Sandoval as Enfermera Malena
- Tiaré Scanda as Conchita
- Rodrigo Abed as Famous
