= The Day I Met El Chapo: The Kate del Castillo Story =

Television series

- Also known as: Cuando conocí al Chapo: La historia de Kate del Castillo
- Genre: Documentary; Biographical
- Created by: David Broome
- Directed by: Carlos Armella
- Narrated by: Kate del Castillo
- Country of origin: United States
- Original language: Spanish
- No. of seasons: 1
- No. of episodes: 3

Original release
- Network: Netflix
- Release: October 20, 2017

The Day I Met El Chapo: The Kate del Castillo Story (Spanish: Cuando conocí al Chapo: La historia de Kate del Castillo) is an American biographical documentary television series, based on real facts about the meeting of Kate del Castillo with El Chapo. The series is created and produced by David Broome and directed by Carlos Armella, and that premiered on Netflix on October 20, 2017.
