= Alguna vez tendremos alas =

Mexican telenovela

- Genre: Telenovela; Romance; Drama
- Created by: Alberto Migré
- Written by: Florinda Meza; Carlos Daniel
- Directed by: Roberto Gómez Fernández
- Starring: Humberto Zurita; Kate del Castillo
- Theme music composer: Carlos Cuevas
- Opening theme: Alguna vez tendremos alas
- Country of origin: Mexico
- Original language: Spanish
- No. of episodes: 235; 130 (of 41-44 minutes)

Production
- Executive producer: Florinda Meza
- Production locations: Filming; Televisa San Ángel; Mexico City, Mexico; Locations
- Running time: 21-22 minutes (episodes 1-60, 86-235); 41-44 minutes (episodes 61-85)
- Production company: Televisa

Original release
- Network: Canal de las Estrellas
- Release: January 6 – November 28, 1997

Related
- 0597 Da Ocupado (1950); El 0597 Está Ocupado (1956); 2-5499 Ocupado (1963); Una Voz En El Teléfono (1990); Louca Paixão (1999)

Alguna vez tendremos alas (English title: Someday we’ll have wings) is a Mexican telenovela produced by Florinda Meza for Televisa in 1997.

On January 6, 1997, Canal de las Estrellas started broadcasting Alguna vez tendremos alas weekdays at 8:00pm, replacing Mujer, casos de la vida real. The last episode was broadcast on November 28, 1997 with No tengo madre replacing it the following Monday.

In 1998, it aired in the Philippines on RPN dubbed in Filipino.

Humberto Zurita and Kate del Castillo starred in this telenovela.

== Plot ==
In one of the poorest neighborhoods of Mexico City lives Ana Hernandez, 17 years old with her mother, named Yolanda; her sisters and her stepfather, a cruel and evil man named Rodolfo Sánchez, nicknamed "El Gato". Ana lives witnessing Rodolfo's mistreatment of her mother and the sexual harassment she herself suffers from Rodolfo. Despite so many pains, Ana is an optimistic girl who dreams of getting ahead and get her mother forward, so she works in a bakery to support Father Miguel, who heads the church choir.

Guillermo Lamas, a famous musician and conductor, lives with his wife, Isabel, and their daughter, Alejandra. He also lives with his sister-in-law, Rosaura, sister of Isabel and artistic representative of Guillermo, and Sebastian, the butler of the house. Both sisters are in love with Guillermo, and although he feels a greater affinity with Rosaura, with whom he shares interests and hobbies, in the end he preferred Isabel, much more docile and patient, whom he considers his muse. Everything in the house Lamas revolves around Guillermo and all live according to him.

Ana meets Nacho Najera, a rich boy who is dedicated to car racing, and they become friends. Although Nacho is committed to Magdalena, a frivolous and interested girl who loves Nacho's fortune more than him, he falls madly in love with Ana. Nacho is going away for a race in Indianapolis, and when he is going back to Mexico to end his relationship with Magdalena, he learns that she is expecting a child of his. On their way back to Mexico, Nacho and his father, Gustavo, are in an airplane crash. After Nacho's death, Magdalena causes an abortion that leaves her sterile.

Meanwhile, "El Gato", feeling threatened by one of his collaborators, assassinates him and feigns his own death to avoid jail. For her part, Yolanda also murdered one of her husband's accomplices; Ana, to protect her mother, is convicted and detained in a reformatory, but for her good behavior is sent to a school-orphanage for girls called "The Hive" and directed by nuns. The young woman manages to gain the confidence of the nuns, who give her support and understanding in addition to the love and love she never had in her house. There, Ana also meets Silvia, the mother of Nacho, who also sees her like a daughter and consoles with her the pain of the death of Nacho.

On the other hand, the happiness of the Lamas family breaks when Isabel is diagnosed with a terminal brain tumor. Isabel discovers this fact though everyone tried to hide it from her at all costs. To protect her husband, whom everyone considers a man temperamental and with a lot of character but in reality is very dependent emotionally, she does not reveal she knows the truth about her health. Advanced in her illness, Isabel suffers an automobile accident with Alejandra. The mother dies and the daughter is paralyzed.

Guillermo's world collapses. He can no longer compose, and his continuous changes of mood and scandals make the entrepreneurs avoid him, so he does not lead orchestras either. Guillermo sinks into depression and leaves music, but shortly after he meets Magdalena, who falls in love with him and wants to conquer him. However, Guillermo does not love Magdalena, but still accepts her love to fill the void left by Isabel. At the same time, Guillermo hires a nurse named Clara to take care of Alejandra and help her walk again, but this woman only dedicates herself to mistreating the girl. In addition, Clara has a relationship with Rodolfo "El Gato", who only beats and humiliates her.

Meanwhile, Ana begins to take care of attending the old telephone of La Colmena while the nun in charge takes their food or rests. By mistake, Ana calls the Lamas family and under the nickname "The Ant" communicates with the little Alejandra, who ventures with her. The two of them talk on the phone every day, but when Guillermo gets into the conversation with "La Hormiga", they both feel a special bond.

Later, Rosaura and Magdalena face each other to stay with the fortune and love of Guillermo, but this last one realizes that it is in the total ruin and becomes lover of Ricardo Aguilera, a prestigious doctor who at the same time is Guillermo's best friend. Finally, Magdalena manages to get Rosaura out of Guillermo's life. Depressed, Rosaura goes to a ranch owned by her father, where she sinks into depression. Shortly after her arrival, a new worker from the ranch, named Mario, who takes advantage of her and turns her into his lover. Mario is actually Rodolfo "El Gato", who starts to beat her, mistreat her and manipulate her for his own benefit.

Ana arrives at the house of Guillermo to be the governess of the little Alejandra. The young woman soon falls in love with Guillermo, but is forced to love him in silence, since he is committed to Magdalena. Guillermo also falls in love with Ana, but does not realize his feelings.

Later, Guillermo discovers his feelings, breaks his relationship with Magdalena and commits himself to Ana. However, she has many doubts about it, and Guillermo falls back into the nets of Magdalena, with whom he is unfaithful to Ana. This was not enough, Nacho Nájera reappears by surprise in Ana's life; The young man survived the air crash that cost his father's life, but has remained mute and amnesic. At the same time, Clara is ill with cancer and Rosaura decides to denounce Rodolfo for fear of jealousy he ends with her life.

Magdalena decides to use a trick for Guillermo to marry her: she shows him a false pregnancy analysis with which she manages to separate him from Ana. But Nacho's mother, Silvia Nájera, informs Ana and Guillermo that Magdalena was barren because of the abortion of Nacho's son and the couple is reconciled. But Magdalena does not give up; With the help of Rodolfo, manages to separate them again by making Guillermo believe that Ana only wanted him for his money and that she deceives him with her own stepfather, so he decides to marry Magdalena. Shortly afterwards, Rodolfo is finally jailed, and Nacho is run over by running after Ana when he recovers his memory as he passes by.

== Cast ==
- Kate del Castillo as Ana Hernández López
- Humberto Zurita as Guillermo Lamas
- Cynthia Klitbo as Rosaura Ontiveros
- Alberto Estrella as Rodolfo Sánchez "El Gato"/Mario García Suárez
- Eugenia Cauduro as Magdalena Arredón Mejía
- René Strickler as Nacho Nájera/Domingo
- Katie Barberi as Isabel Ontiveros de Lamas
- Óscar Bonfiglio as Father Miguel
- Édgar Vivar as Sebastián Medina
- Silvia Mariscal as Silvia de Nájera
- Margarita Isabel as Verónica del Olmo
- David Ostrosky as Dr. Ricardo Aguilera
- Raúl Buenfil as Gregorio Luque
- Ana Karla Kegel as Alejandra Lamas Ontiveros #1
- Elena Paola Kegel as Alejandra Lamas Ontiveros #2
- Luis Couturier as Gustavo Nájera
- Justo Martínez as Father Tomás
- Adriana Barraza as Clara Domínguez
- Anabel Gutiérrez as Bernardita
- Maricarmen Vela as Mother Superior
- Lili Inclán as Mother Tornera
- Yula Pozo as Mother Josefina
- Maickol Segura as Pepín
- Sagrario Baena as Hortensia Mejía de Arredón
- David Rencoret as Hermenegildo Arredón
- María Prado as Matilda*Andrea Sisniega as Andrea
- Mario Prudom as Matías Camargo
- Alejandra Peniche as Yolanda López
- Ramiro Orci as Crispín Mancera
- Ana Layevska as Russian violinist
- Ivonne Montero as Alicia
- Josefina Echánove as Lucía Lamas
- Sherlyn as Girl at the orphanage

== Awards and nominations ==
Year	Award	Category	Nominee(s)	Result
1998	16th TVyNovelas Awards	Best Antagonist Actress	Cynthia Klitbo	Won
1998	16th TVyNovelas Awards	Best Antagonist Actor	Alberto Estrella	Nominated
1998	16th TVyNovelas Awards	Best Supporting Actress	Margarita Isabel	Nominated
1998	16th TVyNovelas Awards	Best Supporting Actor	Édgar Vivar	Nominated
1998	16th TVyNovelas Awards	Best Young Lead Actress	Kate del Castillo	Nominated
1998	16th TVyNovelas Awards	Best Revelation	Eugenia Cauduro	Nominated
1998	Eres Awards	Best Actress	Kate del Castillo	Won
1998	Latin ACE Awards	International Male Figure of the Year	Humberto Zurita	Won
1998	Latin ACE Awards	Best Actress	Cynthia Klitbo	Won
