= Carolina Gaitán =

Colombian actress and singer

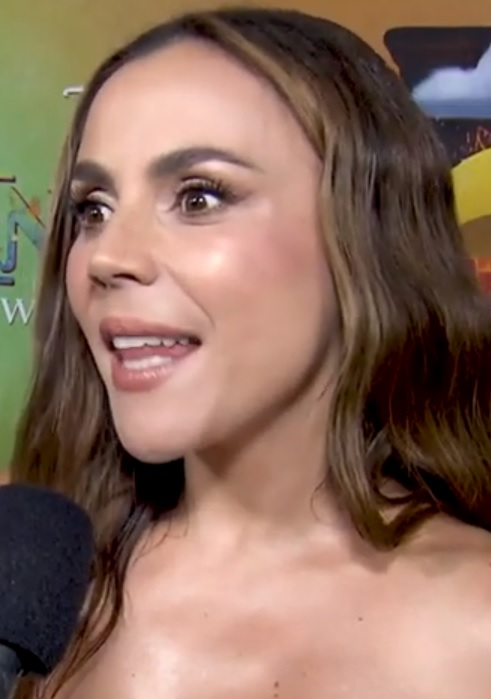
- Gaitán in 2021
- Born: Carolina del Pilar Gaitán Lozano; 4 April 1984 (age 42); Villavicencio, Colombia
- Other name: Carolina Gaitán - La Gaita
- Occupations: Actress; singer
- Years active: 2002–present

Carolina del Pilar Gaitán Lozano (born 4 April 1984) is a Colombian actress and singer. She studied at the Lee Strasberg Theater and Film Institute in New York and has been awarded two Premios Tu Mundo from Telemundo.

She has starred in many series with lead roles in Celia, Sin Senos Sí Hay Paraíso, and Narcos, among many others. She has also worked on several musicals at Colombia's National Theater. As a singer, she has lent her voice to many TV theme songs and has her album composed by her. Her musical project combines the sounds of various tropical currents empowering Latin women with salsa, son, and bolero, among others.

She participated in The Greatest Showman promotional theme "This is Me" and voiced Pepa Madrigal in the 2021 Disney animated film Encanto. She is also participating as a judge in the reality show X Factor Colombia.

== Filmography ==
=== Television ===
| Year | Title | Role | Notes |
|---|---|---|---|
| 2002 | Popstars: Colombia | Herself / Escarcha Member | |
| 2005 | Vuelo 1503 | Yuli Salcedo | |
| 2007 | Así es la vida | Sussana | Episode: "Enamorando a mi esposo" |
| 2007 | Zona rosa | Sara Bautista | |
| 2008 | Mujeres asesinas | Valentina | "Laura, La Encubridora" (Season 2, Episode 7) |
| 2009 | Gabriela, giros del destino | Gabriela Rueda | Lead role |
| 2009–10 | Isa TK+ | Catalina Bernabeu | Lead role |
| 2010 | La Diosa Coronada | Valeria | |
| 2011 | Flor Salvaje | Alicia | Recurring role |
| 2013 | Amo de Casa | Carla | 3 episodes |
| 2013 | Alias el Mexicano | Ana Belén Páez Argüello | Lead role |
| 2015–16 | Hermanitas Calle | Nelly Calle | Lead role |
| 2015 | Narcos | Marta Ochoa | "Descenso" (Season 1, Episode 1); "The Sword of Simón Bolivar" (Season 1, Episode 2) |
| 2015–16 | Celia | Lola Calvo | |
| 2016–2019 | Sin senos sí hay paraíso | Catalina Marín Santana | Lead role |
| 2022 | Juanpis González La Serie | Cams (Camila) | |
| 2024 | Rojo carmesí | Valeria Ruiz | Main role |

=== Film ===
| Year | Title | Role | Notes |
|---|---|---|---|
| 2017 | The Greatest Showman | Background singer | Uncredited |
| 2021 | Encanto | Pepa Madrigal (voice) | English and Spanish versions |
| 2023 | Quicksand | Sofia | |

== Discography ==
=== Extended plays ===
List of extended plays
| Title | Details |
|---|---|
| La Gaita | Released: May 11, 2018; Label: Self-released; Format: Streaming, digital download |
| De Colombia | Released: August 13, 2021; Label: MUN Records; Format: Streaming, digital download |

=== Singles ===
==== As a lead artist ====
| Title | Year | Album |
|---|---|---|
| "Qué No Se Dice de Mi" | 2017 | La Gaita |
| "Miedo" | 2017 | La Gaita |
| "El Primer Beso" | 2020 | Non-album single |
| "Embrujo" (featuring Mariana Gómez) | 2021 | De Colombia |
| "Igual" (with Nico Legreti) | 2021 | Non-album single |
| "Bailaito" | 2022 | TBA |

=== Promotional singles ===
| Title | Year | Album |
|---|---|---|
| "Cerquita del Mar" | 2020 | Non-album promotional singles |
| "Lejos" | 2020 | Non-album promotional singles |
| "I Am Bolero" | 2022 | Non-album promotional singles |

=== Other charted songs ===
List of charted songs, with year released, selected chart positions, and album name shown
| Title | Year | Peak chart positions | | | | | | | | | | Certifications | Album |
| Title | Year | AUS | CAN | GER | IRE | NLD | NZ | SWE | UK | US | WW | Certifications | Album |
|---|---|---|---|---|---|---|---|---|---|---|---|---|---|
| "We Don't Talk About Bruno" (with Mauro Castillo, Adassa, Rhenzy Feliz, Diane Guerrero, and Stephanie Beatriz) | 2021 | 5 | 3 | 71 | 1 | 41 | 4 | 40 | 1 | 1 | 1 | ARIA: Platinum; BPI: 2× Platinum; MC: Gold; RIAA: 2× Platinum | Encanto |

== Awards and nominations ==
| Year | Award | Category | Works | Result |
|---|---|---|---|---|
| 2010 | Premios India Catalina | Best Leading Actress in a Soap Opera | Gabriela, giros del destino | Nominated |
| 2014 | Premios India Catalina | Best Leading Actress in a Series or Mini-Series | Alias el Mexicano | Nominated |
| 2016 | Premios India Catalina | Best Leading Actress in a Telenovela or Series | Las Hermanitas Calle | Nominated |
| 2016 | Premios TVyNovelas (Colombia) | Best Leading Actress in a Series | Las Hermanitas Calle | Nominated |
| 2016 | Premios TVyNovelas (Colombia) | Best Supporting Actress in a Series | Celia | Nominated |
| 2016 | Premios Tu Mundo | Favorite actress novel or series | Celia | Won |
| 2017 | Premios Tu Mundo | Favorite Lead Actress | Sin senos sí hay paraíso | Nominated |
| 2017 | Premios Tu Mundo | The Best Protagonist with Bad Luck | Sin senos sí hay paraíso | Won |
| 2017 | Premios Tu Mundo | The Perfect Couple (with Juan Pablo Urrego) | Sin senos sí hay paraíso | Nominated |
| 2018 | Premios TVyNovelas (Colombia) | Favorite Female Protagonist: Soap opera or Series | Sin senos sí hay paraíso 2 | Nominated |
| 2020 | Premios India Catalina | Best Antagonistic Actress in a Soap Opera or Series | Córdova, un general llamado Arrojo | Nominated |
