= 'Til Jail Do Us Part =

American streaming television series

- Spanish: Armas de mujer
- Genre: Comedy drama
- Created by: José Luis Acosta
- Written by: Enrique Begne; Carlos Quintanilla
- Directed by: Enrique Begné; Claudia Pedraza
- Starring: Kate del Castillo; Roselyn Sánchez; Sylvia Sáenz; Jeimy Osorio
- Theme music composer: Juan Carlos Enriquez
- Country of origin: United States
- Original language: Spanish
- No. of seasons: 1
- No. of episodes: 8

Production
- Executive producers: Mariana Iskandarani; Kate del Castillo; Marcos Santana
- Editor: Ana Castro
- Production company: Telemundo Streaming Studios

Original release
- Network: Peacock
- Release: 15 September 2022

'Til Jail Do Us Part (Spanish: Armas de mujer) is an American television series created by José Luis Acosta. It premiered on Peacock on 15 September 2022.

== Cast ==
- Kate del Castillo as Ángela
- Roselyn Sánchez as Sofía
- Sylvia Sáenz as Viri
- Jeimy Osorio as Esme
- Matias Novoa as Pablo
- Rodrigo Murray as Suazo
- Iván Arana as Miguel
- Mauricio Isaac as Sebas
- Jessica Lindsey as Daniela
- Julieta Egurrola as Enriqueta
- Héctor Suárez Gomis as Alberto
- Xabiani Ponce De León as Leo
- Alejandra Zaid as Marta
- Vanessa Díaz as Elena
- Jamila Hache as Ana
- Francisco Angelini as Max
- Leonrdo Ortizgris as Carlos
- Anthony Álvarez as Tigre
- Polo Monarrez as Vergara

== Episodes ==
No.	Title	Original release date
1	"We Are Not Friends"	15 September 2022
2	"Dead Weight"	15 September 2022
3	"Man to Water"	15 September 2022
4	"The Dead Do Float"	15 September 2022
5	"The Stork"	15 September 2022
6	"War Declaration"	15 September 2022
7	"Fly Through the Air"	15 September 2022
8	"The Exchange"	15 September 2022

== Production ==
=== Development ===
On 17 September 2019, it was announced that Armas de mujer was in development for NBC's planned streaming service, Peacock. Filming of the series began on 6 February 2021 and wrapped in April of that same year.

=== Casting ===
In January 2020 Kate del Castillo was cast in a leading role for the series. On 6 February 2021, Matias Novoa was cast in a main role. On 12 February 2021, Roselyn Sánchez, Sylvia Sáenz and Jeimy Osorio were cast in leading roles. On 27 April 2021, Anthony Álvarez was cast in a main role.

== Release ==
The series premiered on 15 September 2022 on Peacock. HBO Max has acquired the exclusive broadcast rights to release the show in Latin America.
