= Gabriela, giros del destino =

- Genre: Telenovela / Drama
- Directed by: Daniel Bautista; Juan Carlos Delgado
- Starring: Carolina Gaitán; Andrés Toro; John Álex Toro; Carolina Sepúlveda
- Opening theme: Tema de Gabriela, giros del destino (Carolina Gaitán)
- Composers: Irene Salamanca and Alejandro Escallón
- Country of origin: Colombia
- Original language: Spanish
- No. of episodes: 120 x 1 h

Production
- Executive producer: Mauricio Ruiz
- Producer: Juan Carlos Villamizar
- Production locations: Bogotá, Cartagena de Indias
- Cinematography: Germán Plata
- Camera setup: Multicamera
- Running time: 42 minutes

Original release
- Network: Caracol TV
- Release: July 1, 2009 – May 8, 2010

Related
- La quiero a morir

Gabriela, giros del destino (Gabriela, Turns of Destiny) is a 2009 Colombian telenovela produced and broadcast by Caracol TV. Before its release, it was known as Nadie rueda como Gabriela Rueda.

== Plot ==
Gabriela, Destiny rounds Gabriela Rueda (Carolina Gaitán) is a 23-year-old woman from a middle class background, passionate for skating, dreaming of becoming successful in that sport. Pablo Córdoba (Andrés Toro) belongs to a rich family, being son of Efraín (Luis Fernando Múnera), the owner of Malterías Tropical, a big beverage company, living as a womanizer, with nothing to worry about.

Their paths cross each other in the worst way. Gabriela travels to Cartagena, seeking to qualify for the Colombia's national roller skating team. When she is training, Pablo, driving his car after having an argument with his girlfriend Martina (Fiona Horsey), knocks Gabriela down. Pablo takes Gabriela to the hospital, but when he was to be questioned by the police, his family lawyer asks him to leave for the United States. Gabriela, who does not know who knocked her down, recovers but is told that she will never be able to skate again, ruining her dreams of becoming a professional skater, but will later be able to skate.

Six months later, Pablo comes back to Colombia, set to become the manager of the company his father runs. But Efraín decides to make Pablo to work for his company as a common employee for one year, hiding his true origins. Gabriela manages to get a job at Malterías Tropical, where her neighbour Ernesto Zárate (John Álex Toro), who is interested in her, works as an executive. Meanwhile, Verónica Maldonado (Carolina Sepúlveda), who also happened to work at the factory, knows who Pablo really is and feels attracted to him. Pablo tries to vindicate himself with Gabriela, but, unable to tell her he was who knocked her down in Cartagena, ends falling in love with her.
