= Marcela Gallego =

Colombian actress (born 1971)

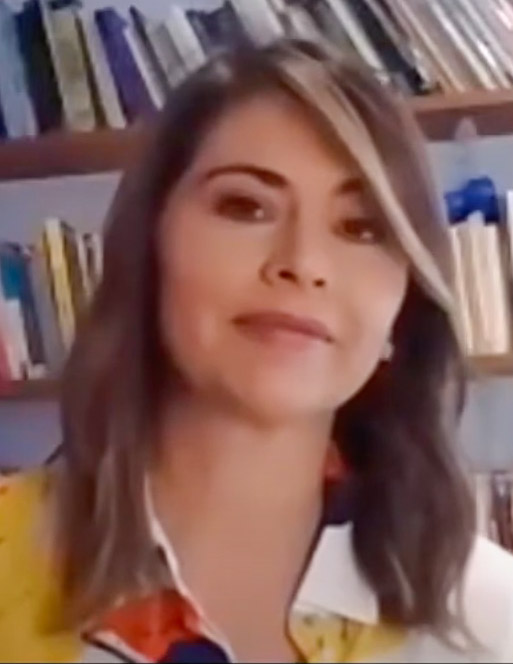
Image of Marcela Gallego

Marcela Gallego (born October 4, 1971) is a Colombian actress, born in Tunja. Most of her work has been in Colombian telenovelas including Celia, some of which have appeared in the U.S. She is also known for acting in the film Satanás.

She studied acting in Bogotá and then in Mexico where she also took courses in direction and dance, and participated in a film and several plays.

In Colombia, she has been on the charts for more than thirty years. She has participated in plays such as Llevados por el deseo, Monólogos de la vagina, Y se armó la mojiganga, La siempre viva and La honesta persona de Sechuán. She has also appeared in films such as Satan, Losing is a matter of method, The strategy of the snail and the half-film Forbidden Games.

In the world of television, she made her debut in the novel Por amor in 1986. She played the role of La pereirana in the series Fronteras del regreso in 1992.
