= Ruta 35 =

- Also known as: Ruta 35, la válvula de escape
- Genre: Telenovela
- Directed by: Santiago Viteri; Ramiro Meneses; Otto Rodríguez
- Starring: Danna García; Miguel Rodarte; Julio Bracho; Lucho Velasco; Osvaldo Benavides; Isabel Moreno
- Narrated by: Zeus Mendoza
- Countries of origin: Venezuela; United States
- Original language: Spanish
- No. of seasons: 1
- No. of episodes: 55

Production
- Executive producer: Cristina Palacio
- Producers: Mirtha Lucena; Ivett Rivero
- Production locations: Miami, Florida
- Camera setup: Multi-camera
- Production companies: Venevisión International Productions; Univision Studios

Original release
- Network: UniMás
- Release: January 12 – February 26, 2016

Ruta 35 or Ruta 35, la válvula de escape (English: Route 35, the Escape Route) is a Spanish-language television series produced by Venevisión International Productions and Univision Studios, and distributed by Cisneros Media Distribution. The series consists of a one season and 65 episodes.

The series premiered on January 12, 2016 until February 26, 2016 on UniMás with a total of 32 episodes.

== Plot ==
The plot revolves around Dylan Wilkins, a federal agent. Narrating the story in first person, Wilkins presents a kaleidoscope of men and women who make the crucial decision to collaborate with the law to avoid a legal process or reduce their criminal charges.

The informants featured in the series include a 75-year-old grandmother who became involved in transporting drugs for a companion, a software engineer whose ties to a Mexican cartel provide access to its activities, and a professional informant who has spent years living a dangerous double life. Another informant is targeted by a ruthless kingpin who has placed a reward on their head. These informants risk their lives while working undercover for various personal reasons, including fear, greed, revenge, and love.

== Cast ==
- Danna García as Sofía Bermúdez
- Miguel Rodarte as Rogelio Bermúdez
- Julio Bracho as Don Domingo
- Lucho Velasco
- Osvaldo Benavides as Mercurio Acosta
- Isabel Moreno as Conchita
- Alexander Torres as Federico Bermúdez
- Paulo Quevedo
- Geraldine Galván as Julia
- Zeus Mendoza as Dylan Wilkins
- Danilo Carrera
