= Jeimy Osorio =

Puerto Rican actress and singer

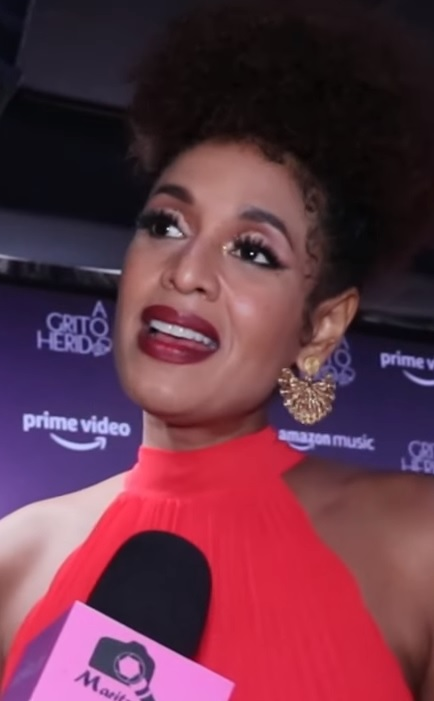
- Osorio in 2022
- Born: Jeirmarie Osorio Rivera; December 22, 1988 (age 37); Ponce, Puerto Rico
- Years active: 2011–present

Jeirmarie "Jeimy" Osorio Rivera (born December 22, 1988) is a Puerto Rican actress and singer. Best known for telenovelas: Una Maid en Manhattan, Porque el amor manda, Santa Diabla and Celia.

== Filmography ==
Film
Year	Title	Role	Notes
2011	Fast Five	Rosa	
2018	Make Love Great Again	Agent Walker	

Television roles
Year	Title	Role	Notes
2011–2012	Una Maid en Manhattan	Tania Taylor	
2012–2013	Porque el amor manda	Jéssica Reyes	182 episodes
2013–2014	Santa Diabla	Mara Lozano	110 episodes
2015–2016	Celia	Young Celia Cruz	55 episodes
2016	The Death of Eva Sofia Valdez	Luz	Television film
2017	Ingobernable	Amanda	Episode: "For the Sake of Justice"
2017	StartUp	Lola	Episode: "Leverage"
2018	Jane the Virgin	Nurse	Episode: Chapter Eighty
2019	Betty en NY	Mariana González	
2020	One Day at a Time	Melba	Episode: "One Halloween at a Time"
2021	La suerte de Loli	Karen	Main cast
2022	'Til Jail Do Us Part	Esme	Main cast
2025	Velvet: El nuevo imperio	Luisa Ortiz	

== Theatre ==
Year	Title	Role	Place
2008	Hairspray	Dynamite	Sala de Festivales del Centro de Bellas Artes Luis A. Ferré en San Juan, Puerto Rico
2009	High School Musical On Stage!	Taylor	
