= Volver a caer =

Mexican TV series

- Genre: Drama
- Based on: Anna Karenina by Leo Tolstoy
- Developed by: Almudena Ocaña; Aurora García Tortosa
- Directed by: Hari Sama
- Starring: Kate del Castillo; Maxi Iglesias; Rubén Zamora
- Theme music composer: Darío Valderrama
- Country of origin: Mexico
- Original language: Spanish
- No. of seasons: 1
- No. of episodes: 6

Production
- Executive producers: Mario Almeida; Aaron Rivera-Ashford; Kate del Castillo; Carmen Cervantes; Jessica Maldonado; Alejandro Rincón; Jerry Rodríguez; Flavio Morales; Issa Guerra; Hari Sama
- Producer: Clara Machado
- Production companies: Endemol Shine Boomdog; Cholawood Productions

Original release
- Network: Vix+
- Release: 20 January – 17 February 2023

Volver a caer ([bolˈβeɾ a kaˈeɾ], "Falling Again") is a Mexican streaming television series based on Leo Tolstoy's 1877 novel Anna Karenina. The series stars Kate del Castillo, Maxi Iglesias and Rubén Zamora.

It premiered on Vix+ on 20 January 2023.

== Premise ==
Anna Montes de Oca is a gold medal-winning Mexican diver who falls in love with Vico, a young musician. Due to society's rejection of their romance, Anna and Vico embark on a journey of self-discovery.

== Cast ==
=== Main ===
- Kate del Castillo as Anna Montes de Oca
- Maxi Iglesias as Vico
- Rubén Zamora as Jandro
- Lucía Gómez Robledo as Kiti
- Edwarda Gurrola as Dolly
- Martín Altomaro as Óscar
- Daniel Tovar as Levin
- Alessandro Islas as Leo
- Verónica Terán as Ileana

=== Recurring and guest stars ===
- Luis Rabago as Jorge
- Camila Nuñez as Lola
- Andre Tavera as Daniel
- Patricio Lucio as Santiago
- Mario Alberto Monroy as Nicolás
- Bárbara López as Mia
- Mar Carrera as Eva
- Karen Leone as Elsa
- Alan Gutiérrez as Adolfo
- Sofía Rivera as Saleswoman
- Marcela Ruiz as Juliette

== Production ==
=== Development ===
On 11 November 2021, it was announced that Pantaya and Endemol Shine Boomdog would co-produce an adaption of Leo Tolstoy's 1877 novel Anna Karenina, based on the 2015 Australian television adaptation The Beautiful Lie. On 23 March 2022, filming of the series began in Mexico City and lasted for six weeks. On 15 December 2022, it was announced that the series would premiere on Vix+, following TelevisaUnivision's acquisition of Pantaya. On 2 January 2023, it was announced that the series would premiere on 20 January 2023.

=== Casting ===
On 11 November 2021, Kate del Castillo was cast in the lead role. On 23 March 2022, a complete cast list was announced.

== Episodes ==
| No. | Title | Original release date |
|---|---|---|
| 1 | "Un segundo y medio" | 20 January 2023 |
| 2 | "Lo siento" | 20 January 2023 |
| 3 | "Una nueva vida" | 27 January 2023 |
| 4 | "Lo que está por venir" | 3 February 2023 |
| 5 | "Pide un deseo" | 10 February 2023 |
| 6 | "El final del viaje" | 17 February 2023 |

== Reception ==
=== Awards and nominations ===
| Year | Award | Category | Nominated | Result | Ref |
|---|---|---|---|---|---|
| 2023 | Premios Juventud | They Make Me Fall In Love | Kate del Castillo & Maxi Iglesias | Nominated | |
| 2023 | Produ Awards | Best Drama Series | Volver a caer | Nominated | |
| 2023 | Produ Awards | Best Lead Actor - Drama Series or Miniseries | Maxi Iglesias | Nominated | |
| 2024 | India Catalina Awards | Best Ibero-American Fiction Series | Volver a caer | Nominated | |
