= Ana (2020 TV series) =

Mexican comedy television series

- Genre: Comedy drama
- Created by: Ana de la Reguera
- Starring: Ana de la Reguera
- Country of origin: Mexico
- Original language: Spanish
- No. of seasons: 3
- No. of episodes: 22

Production
- Executive producer: Ana de la Reguera
- Production companies: Argos Comunicación; Viacom International Studios

Original release
- Network: Comedy Central; Amazon Prime Video; Pantaya (seasons 1–2); Vix (season 3)
- Release: 20 April 2020 – 12 July 2023

Ana is a Mexican comedy-drama television series created by and starring Ana de la Reguera. The series is produced by Argos Comunicación, and Viacom International Studios. It premiered on 20 April 2020 on Comedy Central, subsequently, it was made available to all Latin America via streaming on Amazon Prime Video on 21 April 2020. In the United States and Puerto Rico, the first two seasons premiered on Pantaya, while the third season became available on Vix. In September 2021, the series was renewed for a second and third season. The third and final season premiered on 12 July 2023.

== Cast ==
Part of the cast was confirmed on 11 March 2020 through the Excelsior newspaper.

- Ana de la Reguera as Ana
- Tina Romero as Nena
- Andrés Almeida as Check
- Paulina Dávila as Chock
- Eduardo "Lalo" España as Manager (season 1)
- Carlos Miranda (season 1) and David Palacio (season 2) as Papasito
- Ali Gua Gua as Sis (season 1)
- Tom Parker as Chic (season 1)
- Paly Duval as LatinTuber
- Juan Carlos Vives
- Salvador Sánchez as Bellboy
- Augusto Gardoqui as Guti (season 1)
- Víctor Hernández
- Christian Meier (season 2) as Yo Mero
- Gabriela Roel (season 2)
- Carmen Salinas (season 2)

=== Guest stars ===
- Aracely Arámbula as herself
- Antonio Gaona
- Mariana Echeverría as herself
- Jorge van Rankin as himself
- Vico Escorcia

== Episodes ==
Series	Episodes	Originally released	
Series	Episodes	First released	Last released
1	10	20 April 2020	15 June 2020
2	6	22 July 2022	
3	6	12 July 2023	

=== Season 1 (2020) ===
No. overall	No. in season	Title	Directed by	Written by	Original release date (Note: All ten episodes of the first season were released on Amazon Prime Video on 21 April 2020, ahead of its weekly Comedy Central premieres.)
1	1	"AmericANA"	Carlos Carrera	Ana de la Reguera	20 April 2020
2	2	"HermANA"	Carlos Carrera	Anaí López	20 April 2020
3	3	"LesbiANA"	Carlos Carrera	Fernanda Eguiarte	27 April 2020
4	4	"MarihuANA"	Carlos Carrera	Marcelo Tobar de Albornoz	4 May 2020
5	5	"VeracruzANA"	Carlos Carrera	Fernanda Eguiarte	11 May 2020
6	6	"MarrANA"	Carlos Carrera	Anaí López	18 May 2020
7	7	"BanANA"	Carlos Carrera	Alejandra Olvera	25 May 2020
8	8	"AnciANA"	Carlos Carrera	Alejandra Olvera	1 June 2020
9	9	"VeterANA"	Carlos Carrera	Marcelo Tobar de Albornoz	8 June 2020
10	10	"HumANA"	Carlos Carrera	Ana de la Reguera	15 June 2020

=== Season 2 (2022) ===
No. overall	No. in season	Title	Directed by	Written by	Original release date
11	1	"AlmorrANA"	Marcelo Tobar	Ana de la Reguera	22 July 2022
12	2	"ANAl"	Marcelo Tobar	Marcelo Tobar	22 July 2022
13	3	"PuritANA"	Marcelo Tobar	Alejandra Olvera	22 July 2022
14	4	"JarANA"	Marcelo Tobar	Marcelo Tobar	22 July 2022
15	5	"NANA"	Marcelo Tobar	Anaí López	22 July 2022
16	6	"VillANA"	Marcelo Tobar	Fernanda Eguiarte	22 July 2022

=== Season 3 (2023) ===
No. overall	No. in season	Title	Directed by	Written by	Original release date
17	1	"MelómANA"	Unknown	Unknown	12 July 2023
18	2	"MarciANA"	Unknown	Unknown	12 July 2023
19	3	"ProfANA"	Unknown	Unknown	12 July 2023
20	4	"ANAgnórisis"	Unknown	Unknown	12 July 2023
21	5	"MacANA"	Unknown	Unknown	12 July 2023
22	6	"SoberANA"	Unknown	Unknown	12 July 2023

== Awards and nominations ==
Year	Award	Category	Nominee(s)	Result	Ref.
2021	32nd GLAAD Media Awards	Outstanding Spanish-Language Scripted Television Series		Nominated	
