= Omer Pardillo Cid =

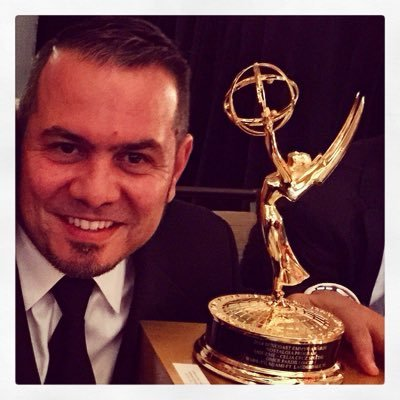
- Omer at the 39th Annual Suncoast Emmy Awards

Omer Pardillo Cid is a Grammy, Latin Grammy and Emmy-winning producer and talent manager. He began his career in 1992 in the Media Relations department at RMM Records in New York City. At RMM, he handled publicity for celebrities, such as Celia Cruz, Marc Anthony and Tito Puente.

In 1998, he became Celia Cruz's manager, handling business, creative and personal aspects of her career. Pardillo-Cid was responsible for negotiating the most important recording deal in her career with Sony Music Entertainment. This relationship with Sony proved to be a key creative development in the singer's career: she earned three Grammys and four Latin Grammys and embarked on the most successful part of her legendary career. In 2002 he founded The Celia Cruz Foundation, a not-for-profit organization with the purpose of providing scholarships for children studying music and to keep "The Queen of Salsa" legacy Project, an organization which celebrates Cruz’s accomplishments and which keeps the Queen of Salsa’s legacy alive.

In 2006 Pardillo Cid became the Vice-President of Entertainment for Eventus, an experiential marketing and entertainment firm based in South Florida, where he works with artists like Cuban-singer Lucrecia, Willy Chirino, Cachao's Mambo All Stars and Celia Cruz All Stars. He is a key component in programs which partner Eventus with Univision and the Latin Recording Academy, among many others. He hosts a weekly radio show "Azucar!, Celebrating the legacy of Celia Cruz", on SiriusXM by National Latino Broadcasting LLC. He is also the sole executor and representative of the Celia Cruz Estate.

In 2011, Pardillo Cid was awarded a Latin Grammy as a producer for Cachao: The Last Mambo in the category of Best Tropical Traditional Album. Also in 2012, he won a Grammy, for "The Last Mambo" in the category of Best Tropical Latin Album.

In 2014, he won an Emmy Award for the television special “Sígueme el Reality Celia Cruz”.

In 2017, Pardillo produced a new play called “CELIA: El Musical” as the definitive musical biography of La Reina de la Salsa. The show, starring Cuban singer Lucrecia, debuted in Miami on December 9 with resounding success, before embarking on a world tour that began at the Starlite Festival in Marbella, Spain.

The Forever CELIA exhibition opened its doors at the Museum of the Cuban Diaspora at the end of 2018 in commemoration of the 15th anniversary of the death of Celia Cruz. Pardillo is the curator for this, the largest exhibition to date of articles related to the life and career of the Cuban Guarachera.

Also at the end of 2018, Pardillo received the Latin Gold Award for the Trajectory of the Latin Awards in Spain.

Pardillo divides his time between Fort Lee, New Jersey and Coral Gables, Florida, with his son Anton.
