= Johnny Laboriel =

Mexican singer (1942–2013)

Background information
- Born: Juan José Laboriel López; July 9, 1942; Tlaxiaco, Oaxaca, Mexico
- Died: September 18, 2013 (aged 71) Mexico City, Mexico
- Genre: Rock and roll
- Occupation: Singer
- Years active: 1958–2013
- Website: johnnylaboriel.com

Juan José Laboriel López (July 9, 1942 – September 18, 2013), commonly known as just Johnny Laboriel, was an Afro-Mexican rock and roll singer. His career started in 1958, when at 16 years old he joined the rock and roll group "Los Rebeldes del Rock".

== Collaborations ==
In 2004, Laboriel was invited by Alex Lora to participate in the 36th anniversary of his band El Tri. The concert was presented at the Auditorio Nacional and is available in CD and DVD as 35 Años y lo que falta todavía.

In 2006, Johnny Laboriel was invited by Luis Álvarez "El Haragán" to participate in the 16th anniversary of his band, El Haragán y Compañía. The concert was presented on November 3, 2006, also at Mexico City's Teatro Metropólitan.

== Personal life and death ==
Laboriel was the son of actor and composer Juan José Laboriel and actress Francisca López de Laboriel. Their parents were Garifuna immigrants from Honduras. He was the brother of bassist Abraham Laboriel and singer Ella Laboriel.

Johnny Laboriel died on September 18, 2013, in Mexico City from prostate cancer. He is survived by his wife Vivianne Thirion, and sons Juan Francisco and Emmanuel.

== Discography ==
- Melodía de Amor
- La Hiedra Venenosa
- Cuando Florezcan los Manzanos
- Historia de Amor
- El Chico Danielito
- Muévanse Todos (vocalista Roberto "Baby" Moreno)
- Rock del Angelito (Rockin' Little Angel Cover)
- La Bamba
- Yakety Yack
- Recuerdas Cuando
- Kansas City
- Corre Sansón Corre
