= Ella Laboriel =

Mexican singer and actress (1945–2026)

- Born: Esperanza Laboriel López; 28 March 1945; Mexico City, Mexico
- Died: 8 July 2026 (aged 81); Mexico City, Mexico
- Occupations: Actress; singer
- Years active: 1964–2008
- Family: Johnny Laboriel (brother); Abraham Laboriel (brother); Abe Laboriel (nephew)
- Musical career
- Genres: A go-go; rock and roll; ballad; jazz; blues
- Instruments: Vocals

Esperanza Laboriel López (28 March 1945 – 8 July 2026), professionally known as Ela Laboriel (sometimes stylized as Ella Laboriel), was a Mexican singer and actress.

== Life and career ==
Ela Laboriel was a member of the artistic Laboriel family, made up of her father Juan José Laboriel, her mother Francisca López, her brothers Abraham, Francis and Johnny Laboriel.

Laboriel career started in 1964, joining the Trío Las Yolis, a group that became famous as part of the female duos and trios of her time. She later left them to become a soloist, performing songs of rock and roll, a go-go and ballads. She also released a duet record with her brother Johnny Laboriel.

In addition to her musical career, Laboriel was also an actress, appearing in the films, telenovelas and programs: El falso heredero (1966), Blue Demon destructor de espías (1968), Under Fire (1983), Mujer, casos de la vida real (1985, 1997), El extraño retorno de Diana Salazar (1988–1989), En carne propia (1990), La pícara soñadora (1991), Te sigo amando (1996–1997) and Tormenta en el paraíso (2007–2008).

== Death ==
Laboriel died on 8 July 2026 at the Casa del Actor nursing home in Mexico City, at the age of 81, as a result of a pulmonary emphysema and chronic obstructive pulmonary disease (COPD). Her remains were cremated.
