= Kate del Castillo =

Mexican and American actress (born 1972)

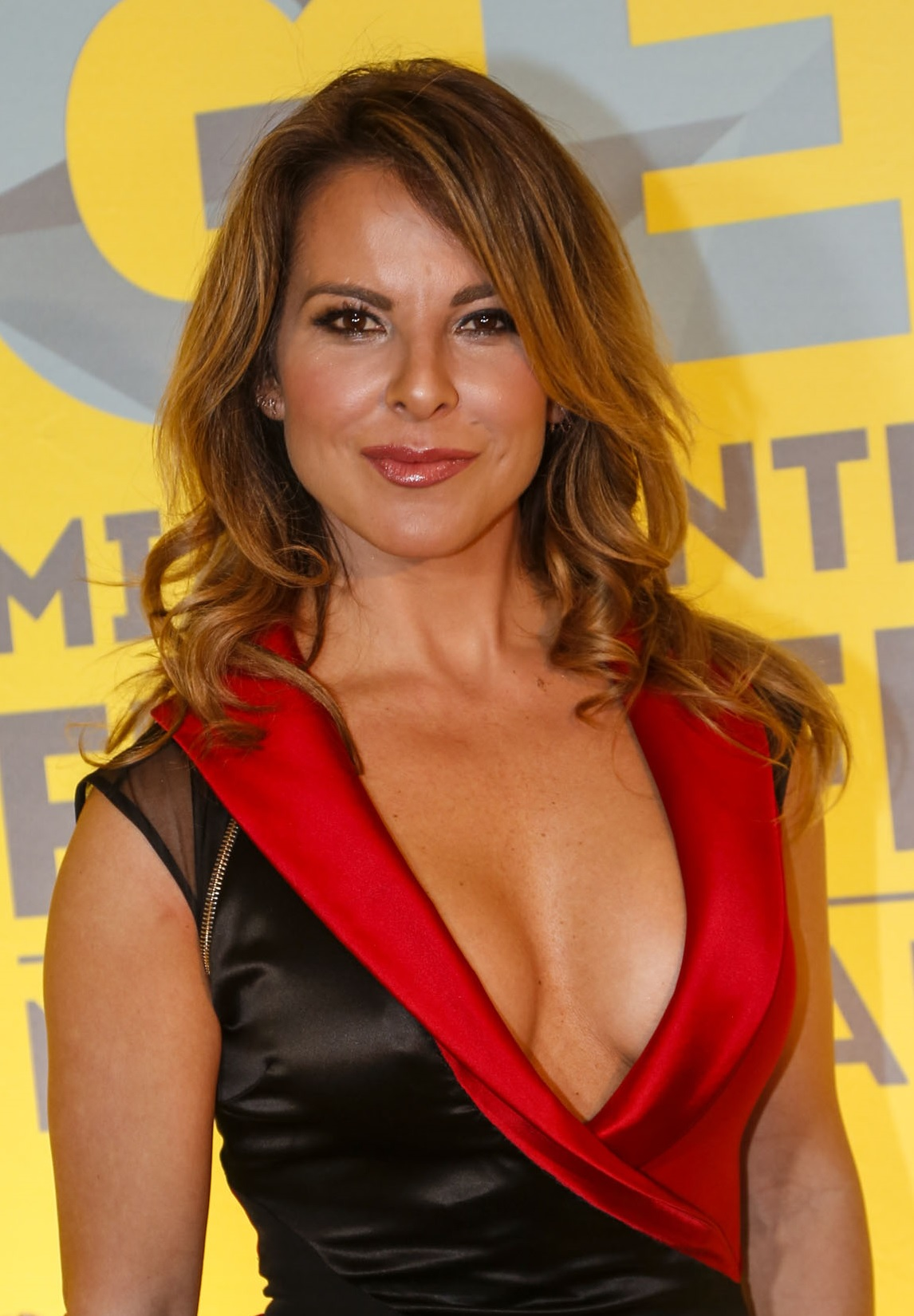
- Del Castillo in 2015
- Born: Kate del Castillo Negrete Trillo; October 23, 1972 (age 53); Mexico City, Mexico
- Citizenship: Mexican (1972–present); American (2015–present)
- Occupation: Actress
- Years active: 1978–present
- Spouses: Luis García Postigo (m. 2001; div. 2004) Aarón Díaz (m. 2009; div. 2012)
- Father: Eric del Castillo

Kate del Castillo Negrete Trillo (Spanish pronunciation: [ˈkejd del kasˈtiʝo neˈɣɾete ˈtɾiʝo]; born October 23, 1972) is a Mexican and American actress. At the age of 19, del Castillo became known for her lead role in the telenovela Muchachitas for Televisa in 1991. Afterwards, she continued her career in film and television in Latin America, playing the leading roles in telenovelas, including Alguna vez tendremos alas (1997), La Mentira (1998), Ramona (2000), Bajo la misma piel (2003–04) and La Reina del Sur (2011–2023).

In 2011, del Castillo earned worldwide recognition for playing the lead role in the Telemundo series La Reina del Sur. In 2017, she went on to star in the Netflix political drama series Ingobernable, playing First Lady of Mexico Emilia Urquiza. Since then, del Castillo has starred in the Peacock comedy-drama series 'Til Jail Do Us Part (2022), and the Fox crime drama series The Cleaning Lady (2024).

Del Castillo made her Hollywood debut as the female lead in the 2007 drama film Under the Same Moon, and later appeared in supporting roles in the films K-11 (2011), No Good Deed (2014), The 33 (2015), El Chicano (2019), and Bad Boys for Life (2020).

== Early life ==
Kate del Castillo Negrete was born on October 23, 1972, in Mexico City, Mexico. She is the daughter of Kate Trillo Graham and Eric del Castillo, a legend of Mexican cinema and a soap opera actor himself. Del Castillo has two siblings: a sister, the journalist Verónica del Castillo, and a half-brother, Ponciano, from her father's side.

== Career ==
=== Early works ===
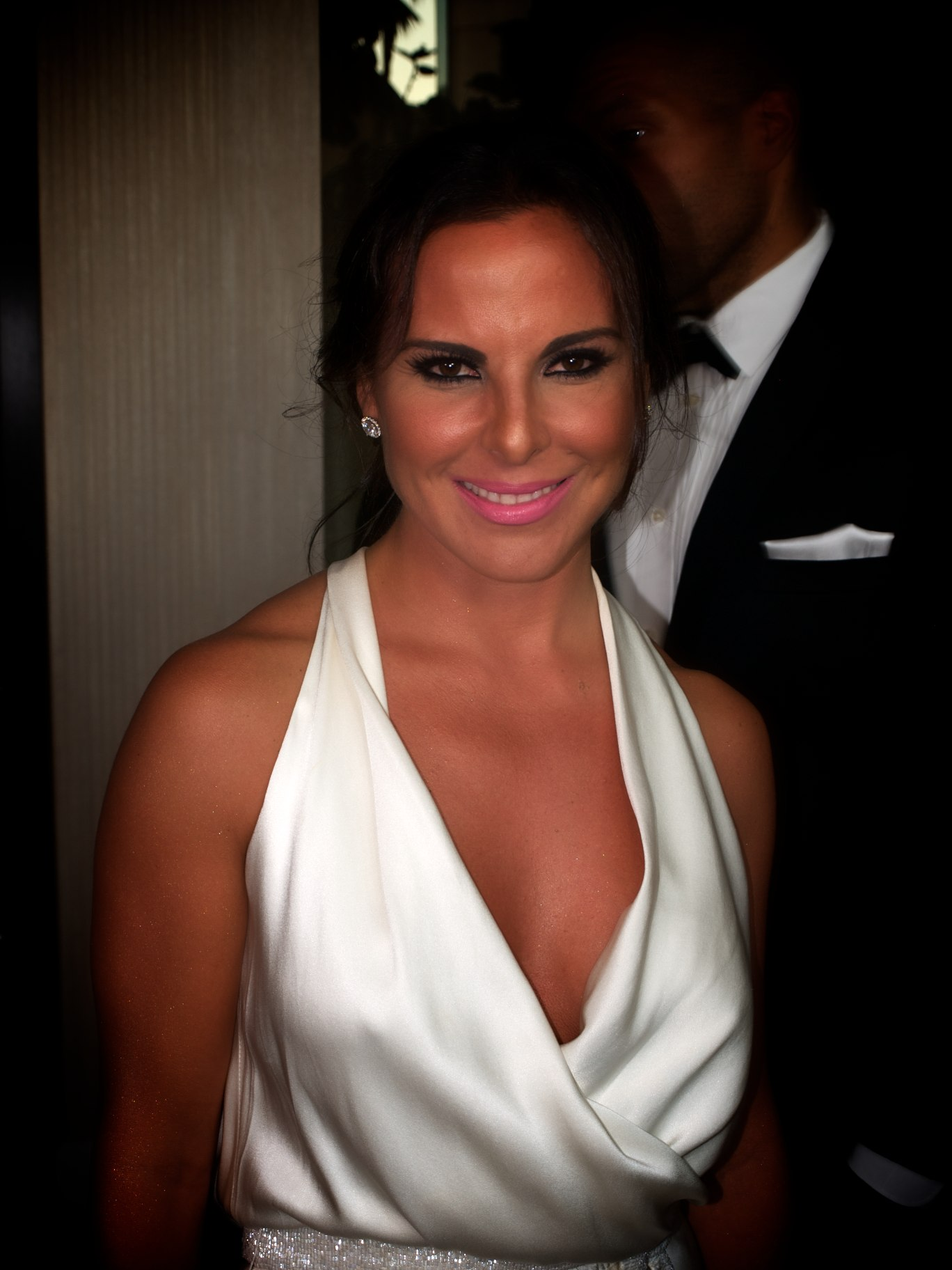
Del Castillo at the 2012 Imagen Awards

Del Castillo made her acting debut in 1978 when she took part in a film called The Last Escape. She became well known in 1991 when she starred as Leticia in Muchachitas, a telenovela airing in several Latin American countries. The following year, she went to star in Mágica juventud. Her other leading roles in 1990s was in Azul (1996), long-running Alguna vez tendremos alas (1997), and La mentira. In 1995 she appeared in the music video "Fuego de Noche, Nieve de Día" by Ricky Martin.

In early 2000s, Del Castillo played the leading roles in telenovelas Ramona (2000), El derecho de nacer (2001) and Bajo la misma piel (2003-2004). In 2003, she made her American television debut playing a recurring role in the PBS drama series American Family starring Edward James Olmos and Sônia Braga. In 2009, she had a recurring role in the Showtime dark comedy-drama Weeds playing Pilar Zuazo, a powerful woman in Mexican politics. In 2002 and 2003, she embarked on an international tour alongside Argentine actor Saul Lisazo with the play Cartas de Amor (Love Letters). In 2005, she starred alongside Demián Bichir in the romantic comedy film American Visa. In 2006, Del Castillo starred in the film Bordertown, which became her first role in Hollywood. In 2007, she went to star in the drama film Under the Same Moon directed by Patricia Riggen. The film grossed $23.3 million against $1.7 million budget. She also starred in a number of independent movies, include The Black Pimpernel (2007) and Julia alongside Tilda Swinton.

In November 2007, Del Castillo was named one of the "Stars of the Year" and in 2011 one of the "25 most influential women" and "50 most beautiful" by People en Español magazine. In 2009, del Castillo was appointed Ambassador for the Mexican Commission on Human Rights and the following year she helped launch the Blue Heart Campaign in order to raise awareness and fight human trafficking.

=== 2011–present ===
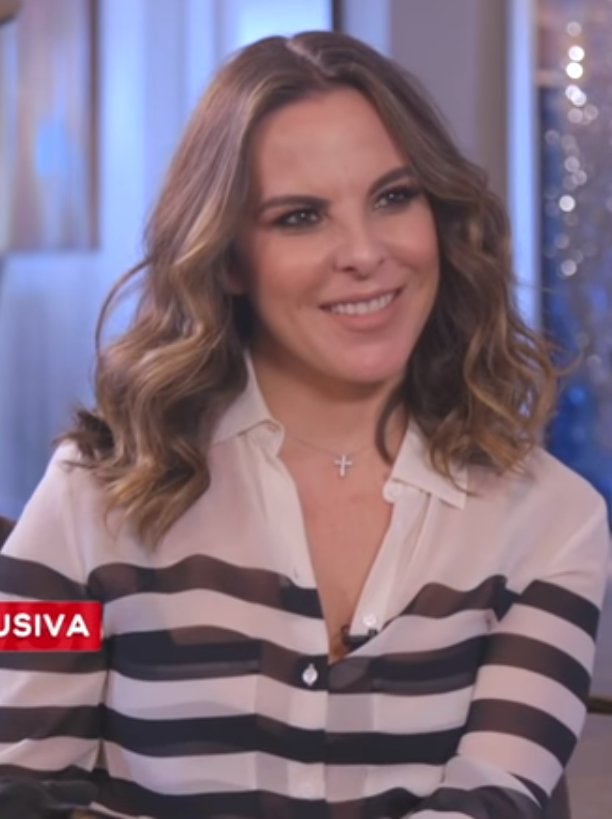
Del Castillo in 2016

In 2011, Del Castillo starred as Teresa "La Mexicana" Mendoza in the Telemundo telenovela La reina del sur based on a novel of the same name by Spanish author Arturo Pérez-Reverte, a role that skyrocketed her fame across Latin America. With a $10 million budget it is the second most expensive telenovela ever produced by Telemundo. The series later was renewed for a second season, that premiered in 2019. del Castillo continued her collaboration with Telemundo in 2015, starring in Dueños del Paraiso. The telenovela is inspired by the drug trade of Miami in the 1970s. She also appeared in a number of American television shows, include CSI: Miami, Grimm and Dallas. In 2015, she had a recurring role as Rogelio de la Vega's ex-wife in the CW comedy series, Jane the Virgin.

On November 20, 2015, Del Castillo launched a new brand of tequila named Honor del Castillo in association with the Vivanco Family. She serves as the spokesperson for the brand. Del Castillo has also appeared in advertising campaigns for L'Oréal and Ford.

In 2012, Del Castillo starred in the Mexican film Colosio: El asesinato, which centers around the assassination of the Mexican presidential candidate Luis Donaldo Colosio. The following year, she starred in the American prison drama film K-11. In later years, Del Castillo appeared in many American movies, including playing Idris Elba's ex in the 2014 thriller No Good Deed, Antonio Banderas' wife in the disaster-survival drama The 33, All About Nina (2018), El Chicano (2019), and Bad Boys for Life (2020). In 2017, she went to star in the Netflix political thriller series, Ingobernable playing the fictional First Lady of Mexico, Emilia Urquiza. The second season premiered in 2018.

In 2019, del Castillo made her off-Broadway debut in the Audible Theater production of Isaac Gomez's play The Way She Spoke. The performance earned her Drama Desk, Drama League, and Lucille Lortel Award for Outstanding Lead Actress in a Play nominations, making her the first Mexican actress to be nominated for three theatre awards in New York.

In 2022, del Castillo starred in the Peacock comedy-drama series, 'Til Jail Do Us Part. She is set to star and produce Volver a caer, a six-part miniseries that a modern take in Spanish on Leo Tolstoy's Anna Karenina. In 2024 she joined the cast of Fox series The Cleaning Lady. In 2024, del Castillo was cast as Mexican singer Chavela Vargas in the miniseries Chavela. She also was cast in the comedy film The Biggest Fan for Netflix playing the role of disgraced actress Lana Cruz.

== Personal life ==
One of del Castillo's first known romantic relations was with Emilio Azcárraga Jean, son of media mogul Emilio Azcárraga Milmo, and now CEO of the largest mass media company in Latin America, the Televisa Group. On February 3, 2001, she married football player Luis García. The marriage was dissolved on September 1, 2004. In August 2009, del Castillo married Aarón Díaz in a Las Vegas ceremony. On July 26, 2011, it was announced that Kate and Díaz were separating. Del Castillo was briefly romantically connected with Sean Penn from 2015 to 2016, although the actor's representatives contest this.

On August 22, 2005, it was reported by the LAPD that del Castillo's new house in Los Angeles had been broken into by thieves, who took some jewelry from the actress. Del Castillo was in Los Angeles filming Bordertown, a film about the female homicides in Ciudad Juárez, when the burglary occurred. A frequent activist for a variety of causes, she posed in a 2012 PETA ad campaign encouraging pet owners to "fiercely protect" their dogs and cats by keeping them indoors. She became a citizen of the United States in September 2015 and resides in Los Angeles.

=== Relationship with El Chapo ===
On January 9, 2012, del Castillo publicly posted an essay on Twitter (using Twextra) discussing social issues in Mexico that included controversial statements directed towards Joaquín "El Chapo" Guzmán, the head of the Sinaloa Cartel. The essay included requests to Mr. Guzmán to "deal with love, with good things" and to "[begin to] traffic in love." The most controversial portion of the essay stated: "Today I believe more in Chapo Guzmán [than in] the government that hides painful truths from me, that hides the cure for cancer, AIDS, etc., for their own benefit and wealth."

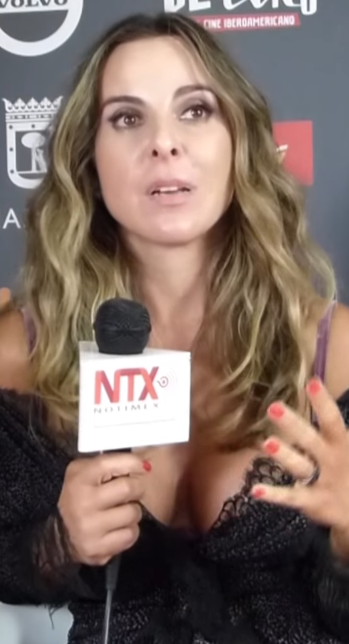
Del Castillo in 2017

Unbeknownst to del Castillo, Guzmán was a longtime fan who harbored romantic feelings for her. Authorities found DVDs of La Reina del Sur at the safe house stormed during Guzmán's initial capture. Del Castillo was contacted by Guzmán's lawyer to discuss producing a biographical film about Guzmán in 2014. As a result of the meetings, she obtained the rights to his life and was unknowingly placed under CISEN surveillance. Communication increased following Guzmán's escape from prison in July 2015. She received a cell phone and the code names Hermosa and Dama from Guzmán. She brokered an interview between American actor Sean Penn and Guzmán in October 2015, shortly before Mexican Marines recaptured him (del Castillo claims in her documentary for Netflix that she did not know Penn intended to interview the drug lord during the meeting). CISEN later released photographs of del Castillo at the meetings with Guzmán's lawyer and of the arrival of the actress and Penn to Mexico.

==== Aftermath ====
In January 2016, Sean Penn and Del Castillo's actions remained under investigation by the Attorney General of Mexico. She was subpoenaed on January 18, 2016, and was to testify before the public prosecutor at the Mexican Consulate in Los Angeles. Del Castillo was originally under investigation for money laundering in relation to the planned movie about Guzmán and her tequila brand Honor del Castillo. The investigation was suspended in 2017 as there was no evidence that proved that Guzmán ever paid del Castillo any money.

On February 5, 2016, a Mexican judge granted del Castillo's petition for an injunction against any arrest related to the federal investigation into her ties with Joaquín Guzmán. The Mexican Attorney General issued a detain-and-interrogate order on del Castillo; however, that would only become effective if del Castillo set foot on Mexican soil. That order was issued after she did not heed a request to voluntarily appear before Mexican prosecutors.

Kate del Castillo did not return to Mexico until December 2018 and therefore since the injunction was issued in 2016 and 2017 filming locations for Ingobernable were changed to San Diego to accommodate restrictions on her travel.

The Day I Met El Chapo: The Kate del Castillo Story premiered in 2017 on Netflix, based on the events surrounding del Castillo's communications with El Chapo.

== Filmography ==
Key
†	Denotes films that have not yet been released

=== Film ===
Year	Title	Role	Notes
1978	Los de abajo		Uncredited
1990	El último escape	Bárbara	
1997	Educación sexual en breves lecciones	Ana	
1997	Reclusorio	Estrella Uribe	Segment: "Sangre entre mujeres"
2004	Avisos de ocasión	Amanda	
2005	American Visa	Blanca	
2006	Bordertown	Elena Díaz	
2006	Lime Salted Love	Isabella Triebel	
2007	El precio de la inocencia / Trade	Laura	
2007	The Black Pimpernel	Consuelo Fuentes	
2007	Under the Same Moon	Rosario Reyes	
2008	Julia	Elena	
2008	Bad Guys	Zena	
2009	Down for Life	Esther	
2011	Without Men	Cleotilde Huaniso	
2012	Colosio: El asesinato	Verónica	
2012	K-11	Mousey	
2013	A Miracle in Spanish Harlem	Eva	
2014	The Book of Life	La Muerte (voice)	Also Latin American Spanish voice-over
2014	No Good Deed	Alexis	
2014	The Popcorn Chronicles	Kate / Rosario	
2014	Visitantes	Ana	
2015	The 33	Katy Valdivia de Sepúlveda	
2016	El Americano: The Movie	Rayito (voice)	
2018	All About Nina	Lake	
2019	El Chicano	Cartel Leader	
2020	Bad Boys for Life	Isabel Aretas	
2022	Hunting Ava Bravo	Ava Bravo	
2023	Dora and the Fantastical Creatures	Ale (voice)	Short film
2024	The Casagrandes Movie	Sisiki (voice)	
2025	Trap House	Natalia Cabrera	
2025	The Biggest Fan	Lana Cruz	Netflix
TBA	A Cuban Girl's Guide to Tea and Tomorrow †	TBA	Post-production

=== Television ===
Year	Title	Role	Notes
1991	Muchachitas	Leticia Bustamante	Television debut
1992	Mágica juventud	Fernanda	
1994	Imperio de cristal	Narda Lombardo	
1995	Mujer, casos de la vida real	Unknown role	Episode: "Aunque parezca mentira"
1996	Azul	Alejandra	
1997	Alguna vez tendremos alas	Ana Hernández	Main role
1998	La mentira	Verónica Fernández-Negrete	Main role; 100 episodes
2000	Ramona	Ramona	Main role
2001	El derecho de nacer	María Elena del Junco	Main role
2002	American Family	Ofelia	10 episodes
2003	Bajo la misma piel	Miranda Murillo Ortiz	
2004	Kate Del Castillo en La Riviera Maya	Kate	Television film
2009	The Cleaner	Josefina	Episode: "Does Everybody Have a Drink?"
2009	Weeds	Pilar Zuazo	5 episodes
2009	El Pantera	Coco	2 episodes
2011–2026	La Reina del Sur	Teresa Mendoza	Main role; 183 episodes
2011	CSI: Miami	Anita Torres	Episode: "Killer Regrets"
2012	Grimm	Valentina Espinosa	Episode: "La Llorona"
2013	Dallas	Sergeant Marisela Ruiz	Episode: "JR's Masterpiece"
2014	Killer Women	Esmeralda Montero	Episode: "Queen Bee"
2015	Dueños del paraíso	Anastasia Cardona	Main role; 69 episodes
2015	Jane the Virgin	Luciana Leon	3 episodes
2016	Telenovela	Kate	Episode: "The Rivals"
2017–2018	Ingobernable	Emilia Urquiza	Main role; 27 episodes
2017	The Day I Met El Chapo: The Kate del Castillo Story	Herself	Main role; 3 episodes
2021	Mr. Mayor	Victoria Santos	Episode: "#PalmTreeReform"
2021	Maya and the Three	Lady Micte, the Goddess of Death	Main role; 9 episodes
2022–2024	Monster High	Selena Wolf	
2022	'Til Jail Do Us Part	Ángela	Main role; 8 episodes
2023	Volver a caer	Anna Montes de Oca	Main role
2024	Dora	Ale the Alebrije (voice)	Guest role
2024–2025	The Cleaning Lady	Ramona Sanchez	Main role

== Awards ==
Awards and nominations
Year	Award	Category	Nominated work	Result
1992	Premios TVyNovelas	Best Female Revelation	Muchachitas	Nominated
1995	Premios TVyNovelas	Best young actress	Imperio de cristal	Won
1998	Premios TVyNovelas	Best young actress	Alguna vez tendremos alas	Nominated
1999	Premios TVyNovelas	Best young actress	La mentira	Nominated
2005	Premios Ariel	Best Actress	American Visa	Nominated
2006	Festival de Cine Iberoamericano de Huelva	Colón de Plata for Best Actress	American Visa	Won
2008	Premios Diosa de Plata	Best Actress	Under the Same Moon	Nominated
2011	Premios People en Español	Best Actress	La Reina del Sur	Won
2011	Premios People en Español	Best Couple (with Iván Sánchez)	La Reina del Sur	Nominated
2011	Premios People en Español	Best Couple (with Rafael Amaya)	La Reina del Sur	Nominated
2018	Platino Awards	Best Actress in a Miniseries or TV series	Ingobernable	Nominated
