= Abel Rodríguez (actor) =

Cuban actor (1971–2021)

Abel Rodríguez Ramírez
- Born: Abel Rodríguez Ramírez; January 1, 1971; Cuba
- Died: October 15, 2021 (aged 50)
- Occupation: Actor

Abel Rodríguez Ramírez (1 January 1971 – 15 October 2021) was a Cuban actor. He was married to the Colombian actress Anna Lopez with whom he has a son named Benjamin.

== Television role ==
- 2015 Celia ... Eliecer Calvo
- 2010 El Clon ... Enrique
- 2009 Verano en Venecia ... Miguel Tirado
- 2008 Tiempo final ... Castro
- 2006 Por Amor ... Jose Angel Rivero del Castillo
- 2005 Corazón delator (short)
- 2005 Viva Cuba ... Malú's father
- 2005 Bailando chachacha
- 2004 Pasaje de ida (short)
- 2004 La viuda de la mafia ... Camilio Pulido
- 2002 Rosa la china ... Marco
- 2002 Scent of Oak ... José Álvarez
